= 2019 Texas Rangers season =

2019 Texas Rangers
- League: American League
- Division: West
- Ballpark: Globe Life Park in Arlington
- City: Arlington
- Record: 78–84 (.481)
- Divisional place: 3rd
- Owners: Ray Davis & Bob R. Simpson
- Managers: Chris Woodward
- Television: Fox Sports Southwest (Dave Raymond, C.J. Nitkowski, Tom Grieve)
- Radio: KRLD 105.3 FM (English) (Eric Nadel, Matt Hicks, Dave Raymond); KZMP 1540 AM (Spanish) (Eleno Orlenas, Jerry Romo)
- Stats: ESPN.com; Baseball Reference

The 2019 Texas Rangers season was the 59th of the Texas Rangers franchise overall, their 48th in Arlington as the Rangers, and their 26th and final season at Globe Life Park in Arlington. The Rangers began the season on March 28 against the Chicago Cubs and finished the season on September 29 against the New York Yankees. On November 2, 2018, Chris Woodward was hired to be the manager of the Rangers for the 2019 season. Despite a strong May and June for the team, they fell apart after that, failing to qualify for the postseason for the third consecutive year.

== Regular season ==
=== Season standings ===
==== American League West ====
AL West
Team	W	L	Pct.	GB	Home	Road
Houston Astros	107	55	.660	—	60‍–‍21	47‍–‍34
Oakland Athletics	97	65	.599	10	52‍–‍29	45‍–‍36
Texas Rangers	78	84	.481	29	45‍–‍36	33‍–‍48
Los Angeles Angels	72	90	.444	35	38‍–‍43	34‍–‍47
Seattle Mariners	68	94	.420	39	35‍–‍46	33‍–‍48

==== American League Wild Card ====
Division leaders
Team	W	L	Pct.
Houston Astros	107	55	.660
New York Yankees	103	59	.636
Minnesota Twins	101	61	.623

Wild Card teams (Top 2 teams qualify for postseason)
Team	W	L	Pct.	GB
Oakland Athletics	97	65	.599	+1
Tampa Bay Rays	96	66	.593	—
Cleveland Indians	93	69	.574	3
Boston Red Sox	84	78	.519	12
Texas Rangers	78	84	.481	18
Chicago White Sox	72	89	.447	23½
Los Angeles Angels	72	90	.444	24
Seattle Mariners	68	94	.420	28
Toronto Blue Jays	67	95	.414	29
Kansas City Royals	59	103	.364	37
Baltimore Orioles	54	108	.333	42
Detroit Tigers	47	114	.292	48½

==== Record against opponents ====
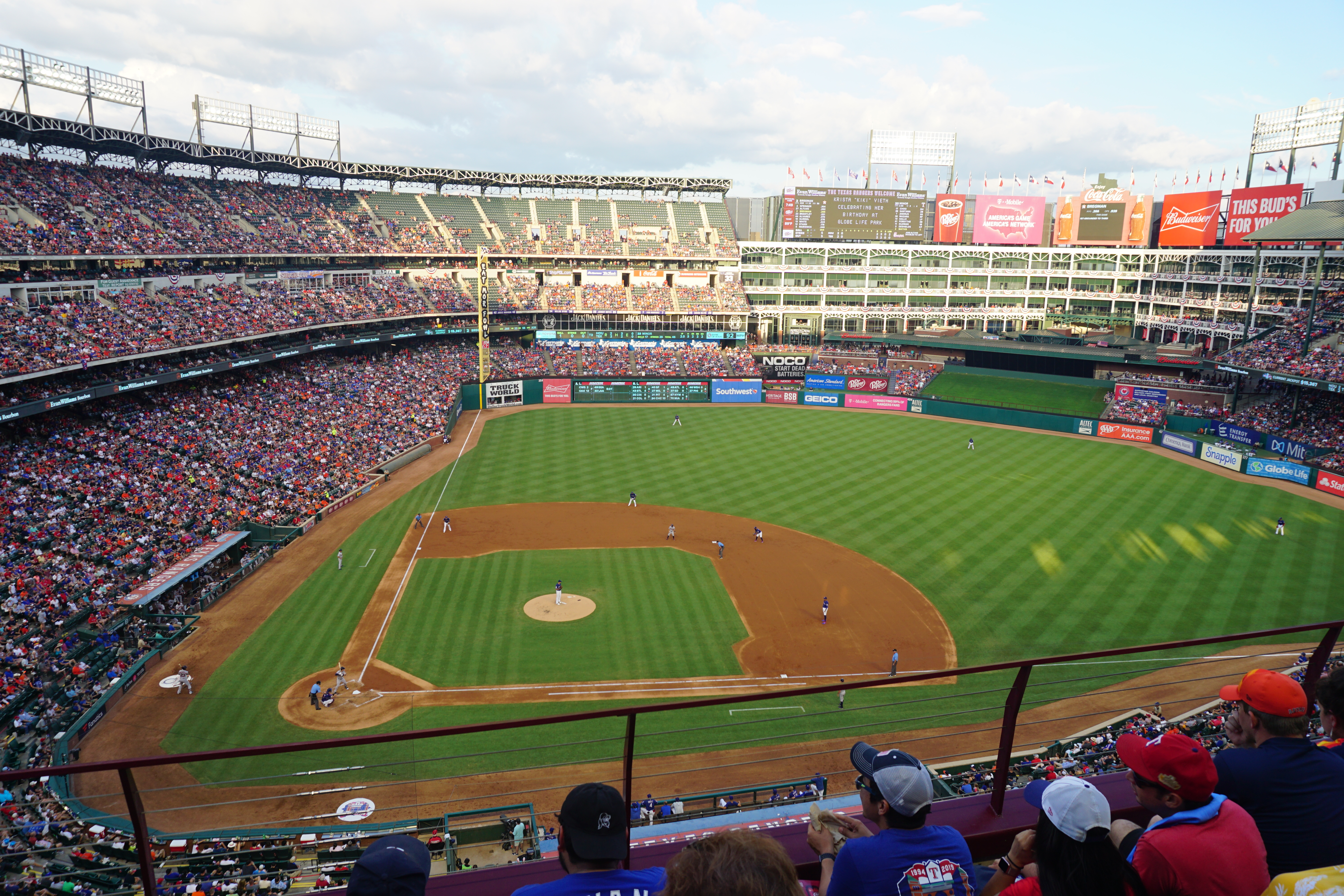
The Rangers hosting Houston on July 13

2019 American League record Source: MLB Standings Grid – 2019
Team	BAL	BOS	CWS	CLE	DET	HOU	KC	LAA	MIN	NYY	OAK	SEA	TB	TEX	TOR	NL
Baltimore	—	7–12	3–3	3–4	3–4	2–4	3–3	4–3	0–6	2–17	1–6	3–4	7–12	1–6	8–11	7–13
Boston	12–7	—	5–2	3–3	5–2	2–4	5–1	4–3	3–3	5–14	4–3	4–3	7–12	4–3	11–8	10–10
Chicago	3–3	2–5	—	11–8	12–6	4–3	9–10	2–5	6–13	4–3	1–5	2–4	2–4	4–3	4–3	6–14
Cleveland	4–3	3–3	8–11	—	18–1	3–4	12–7	6–0	10–9	4–3	1–5	5–1	1–6	4–3	6–1	8–12
Detroit	4–3	2–5	6–12	1–18	—	1–6	10–9	3–3	5–14	3–3	1–6	1–6	2–4	0–6	3–4	5–15
Houston	4–2	4–2	3–4	4–3	6–1	—	5–1	14–5	3–4	4–3	11–8	18–1	3–4	13–6	4–2	11–9
Kansas City	3–3	1–5	10–9	7–12	9–10	1–5	—	2–4	5–14	2–5	2–5	2–5	3–4	2–5	1–6	9–11
Los Angeles	3–4	3–4	5–2	0–6	3–3	5–14	4–2	—	1–5	2–5	6–13	10–9	3–4	9–10	6–1	12–8
Minnesota	6–0	3–3	13–6	9–10	14–5	4–3	14–5	5–1	—	2–4	3–4	5–2	5–2	6–1	4–3	8–12
New York	17–2	14–5	3–4	3–4	3–3	3–4	5–2	5–2	4–2	—	2–4	6–1	12–7	3–3	11–8	12–8
Oakland	6–1	3–4	5–1	5–1	6–1	8–11	5–2	13–6	4–3	4–2	—	10–9	4–3	13–6	0–6	11–9
Seattle	4–3	3–4	4–2	1–5	6–1	1–18	5–2	9–10	2–5	1–6	9–10	—	2–4	8–11	4–2	9–11
Tampa Bay	12–7	12–7	4–2	6–1	4–2	4–3	4–3	4–3	2–5	7–12	3–4	4–2	—	3–3	13–6	14–6
Texas	6–1	3–4	3–4	3–4	6–0	6–13	5–2	10–9	1–6	3–3	6–13	11–8	3–3	—	3–3	9–11
Toronto	11–8	8–11	3–4	1–6	4–3	2–4	6–1	1–6	3–4	8–11	6–0	2–4	6–13	3–3	—	3–17

== Game log ==
2019 Game Log 78–84 (Home: 45–36; Away: 33–48)
March: 2–1 (Home: 2–1; Away: 0–0)

#	Date	Opponent	Score	Win	Loss	Save	Attendance	Record	Streak
1	March 28	Cubs	4–12	Lester (1–0)	Minor (0–1)	—	48,538	0–1	L1
2	March 30	Cubs	8–6	Kelley (1–0)	Edwards Jr. (0–1)	Leclerc (1)	46,238	1–1	W1
3	March 31	Cubs	11–10	Leclerc (1–0)	Strop (0–1)	—	36,812	2–1	W2

April: 12–13 (Home: 8–4; Away: 4–9)

#	Date	Opponent	Score	Win	Loss	Save	Attendance	Record	Streak
4	April 1	Astros	1–2	Peacock (1–0)	Sampson (0–1)	Osuna (1)	18,056	2–2	L1
5	April 2	Astros	6–4	Kelley (2–0)	Valdez (0–1)	Leclerc (2)	17,907	3–2	W1
6	April 3	Astros	4–0	Minor (1–1)	Cole (0–2)	—	22,265	4–2	W2
7	April 4	@ Angels	11–4	Springs (1–0)	Harvey (0–1)	—	42,027	5–2	W3
8	April 5	@ Angels	1–3	Anderson (1–0)	Lynn (0–1)	Allen (1)	41,089	5–3	L1
9	April 6	@ Angels	1–5	Skaggs (1–1)	Smyly (0–1)	—	31,747	5–4	L2
10	April 7	@ Angels	2–7	Anderson (2–0)	Miller (0–1)	—	42,076	5–5	L3
11	April 9	@ Dbacks	4–5	Andriese (2–0)	Leclerc (1–1)	—	16,620	5–6	L4
12	April 10	@ Dbacks	5–2	Lynn (1–1)	Chafin (0–1)	Bird (1)	15,871	6–6	W1
13	April 12	Athletics	6–8	Trivino (1–0)	Martin (0–1)	Treinen (5)	24,817	6–7	L1
–	April 13	Athletics	Postponed (rain); Rescheduled for June 8 as part of a doubleheader.						
14	April 14	Athletics	8–7	Springs (2–0)	Soria (0–2)	Leclerc (3)	26,350	7–7	W1
15	April 15	Angels	12–7	Dowdy (1–0)	Bedrosian (1–1)	Leclerc (4)	18,265	8–7	W2
16	April 16	Angels	5–0	Minor (2–1)	Barría (1–1)	—	17,704	9–7	W3
17	April 17	Angels	5–4	Lynn (2–1)	Harvey (0–2)	Leclerc (5)	16,691	10–7	W4
18	April 19	Astros	2–7	Verlander (3–0)	Smyly (0–2)	—	35,649	10–8	L1
19	April 20	Astros	9–4	Kelley (3–0)	Cole (1–3)	—	39,636	11–8	W1
20	April 21	Astros	11–10	Miller (1–1)	McHugh (3–2)	Kelley (1)	26,225	12–8	W2
21	April 22	@ Athletics	1–6	Bassitt (1–0)	Minor (2–2)	—	8,073	12–9	L1
22	April 23	@ Athletics	5–11	Montas (4–1)	Lynn (2–2)	—	10,496	12–10	L2
23	April 24	@ Athletics	5–6	Treinen (1–1)	Martin (0–2)	—	18,610	12–11	L3
24	April 25	@ Mariners	2–14	Gonzales (5–0)	Hearn (0–1)	—	12,644	12–12	L4
25	April 26	@ Mariners	4–5 (11)	Elías (2–0)	Dowdy (1–1)	—	21,721	12–13	L5
26	April 27	@ Mariners	15–1	Minor (3–2)	Leake (2–3)	—	26,493	13–13	W1
27	April 28	@ Mariners	14–1	Lynn (3–2)	Swanson (0–3)	—	21,503	14–13	W2
28	April 30	Pirates	4–6 (11)	Crick (1–1)	Chavez (0–1)	Vázquez (7)	18,641	14–14	L1

May: 14–13 (Home: 8–4; Away: 6–9)

#	Date	Opponent	Score	Win	Loss	Save	Attendance	Record	Streak
29	May 1	Pirates	5–7	Taillon (2–3)	Miller (1–2)	Vázquez (8)	23,562	14–15	L2
30	May 3	Blue Jays	0–1 (12)	Hudson (2–1)	Jurado (0–1)	Giles (8)	26,179	14–16	L3
31	May 4	Blue Jays	8–5	Lynn (4–2)	Pannone (1–3)	Kelley (2)	31,787	15–16	W1
32	May 5	Blue Jays	10–2	Dowdy (2–1)	Buchholz (0–2)	—	30,934	16–16	W2
33	May 7	@ Pirates	4–5	Feliz (2–0)	Sampson (0–2)	Vázquez (10)	13,032	16–17	L1
34	May 8	@ Pirates	9–6	Jurado (1–1)	Lyons (1–1)	Martin (1)	13,905	17–17	W1
35	May 9	@ Astros	2–4	Miley (3–2)	Minor (3–3)	Osuna (9)	26,657	17–18	L1
36	May 10	@ Astros	0–3	Verlander (6–1)	Lynn (4–3)	Osuna (10)	33,023	17–19	L2
37	May 11	@ Astros	4–11	Cole (4–4)	Smyly (0–3)	—	35,849	17–20	L3
38	May 12	@ Astros	5–15	Martin (1–0)	Sampson (0–3)	—	41,027	17–21	L4
39	May 14	@ Royals	5–11	Duffy (2–1)	Miller (1–3)	—	19,410	17–22	L5
40	May 15	@ Royals	6–1	Minor (4–3)	López (0–5)	—	14,572	18–22	W1
41	May 16	@ Royals	16–1	Lynn (5–3)	Bailey (4–4)	—	17,469	19–22	W2
42	May 17	Cardinals	7–3	Sampson (1–3)	Mikolas (4–4)	—	34,398	20–22	W3
43	May 18	Cardinals	2–8	Hudson (3–3)	Jurado (1–2)	—	30,967	20–23	L1
44	May 19	Cardinals	5–4 (10)	Gómez (1–0)	Hicks (1–2)	—	32,112	21–23	W1
45	May 20	Mariners	10–9	Minor (5–3)	Leake (3–5)	—	18,796	22–23	W2
46	May 21	Mariners	5–3	Lynn (6–3)	Milone (0–1)	Kelley (3)	19,157	23–23	W3
47	May 22	Mariners	2–1	Sampson (2–3)	Gonzales (5–4)	Kelley (4)	22,400	24–23	W4
48	May 24	@ Angels	4–3	Smyly (1–3)	Bedrosian (1–3)	Kelley (5)	43,806	25–23	W5
49	May 25	@ Angels	2–3	Robles (2–0)	Kelley (3–1)	—	36,392	25–24	L1
50	May 26	@ Angels	6–7	García (1–1)	Springs (2–1)	Justin Anderson (1)	39,406	25–25	L2
51	May 27	@ Mariners	2–6	Milone (1–1)	Lynn (6–4)	—	14,135	25–26	L3
52	May 28	@ Mariners	11–4	Sampson (3–3)	Gonzales (5–5)	—	12,452	26–26	W1
53	May 29	@ Mariners	8–7	Chavez (1–1)	Bass (0–1)	Kelley (6)	16,059	27–26	W2
54	May 30	Royals	2–4	Junis (4–5)	Minor (5–4)	Kennedy (3)	26,202	27–27	L1
55	May 31	Royals	6–2	Jurado (2–2)	Duffy (3–2)	—	31,175	28–27	W1

June: 18–11 (Home: 10–6; Away: 8–5)

#	Date	Opponent	Score	Win	Loss	Save	Attendance	Record	Streak
56	June 1	Royals	6–2	Lynn (7–4)	Bailey (4–6)	—	27,133	29–27	W2
57	June 2	Royals	5–1	Sampson (4–3)	Keller (3–7)	—	21,891	30–27	W3
58	June 4	Orioles	11–12	Bundy (3–6)	Smyly (1–4)	Givens (5)	21,903	30–28	L1
59	June 5	Orioles	2–1 (12)	Springs (3–1)	Fry (0–3)	—	21,163	31–28	W1
60	June 6	Orioles	4–3	Jurado (3–2)	Hess (1–8)	Kelley (7)	20,462	32–28	W2
61	June 7	Athletics	3–5	Petit (1–1)	Leclerc (1–2)	Treinen (13)	25,120	32–29	L1
62	June 8 (1)	Athletics	10–5	Springs (4–1)	Blackburn (0–1)	—	22,327	33–29	W1
63	June 8 (2)	Athletics	3–1	Sampson (5–3)	Bassitt (3–2)	—	39,514	34–29	W2
64	June 9	Athletics	8–9	Montas (8–2)	Smyly (1–5)	Treinen (14)	20,358	34–30	L1
65	June 10	@ Red Sox	4–3 (11)	Chavez (2–1)	Brasier (2–3)	Martin (2)	34,422	35–30	W1
66	June 11	@ Red Sox	9–5	Jurado (4–2)	Hernández (0–1)	—	35,121	36–30	W2
67	June 12	@ Red Sox	3–4	Barnes (3–1)	Chavez (2–2)	—	34,330	36–31	L1
68	June 13	@ Red Sox	6–7	Workman (4–1)	Fairbanks (0–1)	Smith (1)	35,841	36–32	L2
69	June 14	@ Reds	7–1	Martin (1–0)	Mahle (2–7)	Smyly (1)	30,090	37–32	W1
70	June 15	@ Reds	4–3	Minor (6–4)	Roark (4–6)	Kelley (8)	25,693	38–32	W2
71	June 16	@ Reds	3–11	Gray (3–5)	Jurado (4–3)	—	24,079	38–33	L1
72	June 17	Indians	7–2	Lynn (8–4)	Clevinger (1–1)	—	20,860	39–33	W1
73	June 18	Indians	3–10	Plesac (2–2)	Sampson (5–4)	—	19,233	39–34	L1
74	June 19	Indians	4–10	Pérez (2–1)	Palumbo (0–1)	—	22,906	39–35	L2
75	June 20	Indians	4–2	Minor (7–4)	Bieber (6–3)	Kelley (9)	18,531	40–35	W1
76	June 21	White Sox	4–5 (10)	Herrera (3–3)	Kelley (3–2)	Colomé (16)	29,333	40–36	L1
77	June 22	White Sox	6–5	Lynn (9–4)	Marshall (3–1)	Martin (3)	33,582	41–36	W1
78	June 23	White Sox	7–4	Sampson (6–4)	Nova (3–6)	Kelley (10)	21,917	42–36	W2
79	June 25	@ Tigers	5–3	Chavez (3–2)	Zimmermann (0–5)	—	18,952	43–36	W3
80	June 26	@ Tigers	4–1	Minor (8–4)	Boyd (5–6)	—	19,732	44–36	W4
81	June 27	@ Tigers	3–1	Jurado (5–3)	Turnbull (3–8)	Kelley (11)	22,925	45–36	W5
82	June 28	@ Rays	5–0	Lynn (10–4)	Chirinos (7–4)	—	13,955	46–36	W6
83	June 29	@ Rays	2–5	McKay (1–0)	Sampson (6–5)	—	16,655	46–37	L1
84	June 30	@ Rays	2–6	Snell (5–7)	Chavez (3–3)	—	11,234	46–38	L2

July: 8–16 (Home: 4–7; Away: 4–9)

#	Date	Opponent	Score	Win	Loss	Save	Attendance	Record	Streak
–	July 1	Angels	Postponed (death of Angels' P Tyler Skaggs); Rescheduled for August 20 as part of a doubleheader.						
85	July 2	Angels	4–9	Cahill (3–6)	Fairbanks (0–2)	—	20,931	46–39	L3
86	July 3	Angels	2–6	Barría (3–2)	Jurado (5–4)	—	28,998	46–40	L4
87	July 4	Angels	9–3	Lynn (11–4)	Canning (3–5)	—	45,566	47–40	W1
88	July 5	@ Twins	6–15	Pérez (8–3)	Sampson (6–6)		38,073	47–41	L1
89	July 6	@ Twins	4–7	Pineda (6–4)	Chavez (3–4)	Rogers (12)	36,969	47–42	L2
90	July 7	@ Twins	4–1 (11)	Kelley (4–2)	Mejía (0–2)	—	35,495	48–42	W1
90th All-Star Game in Cleveland, Ohio
91	July 11	Astros	5–0	Lynn (12–4)	Valdez (3–5)	—	37,964	49–42	W2
92	July 12	Astros	9–8	Kelley (5–2)	Osuna (3–2)	—	32,322	50–42	W3
93	July 13	Astros	6–7 (11)	James (4–0)	Martin (1–1)	Osuna (20)	42,452	50–43	L1
94	July 14	Astros	4–12	Verlander (11–4)	Jurado (5–5)	—	27,916	50–44	L2
95	July 16	Dbacks	2–9	Young (3–0)	Lynn (12–5)	—	19,202	50–45	L3
96	July 17	Dbacks	4–19	Ray (8–6)	Chavez (3–5)	—	26,681	50–46	L4
97	July 19	@ Astros	3–4	Verlander (12–4)	Minor (8–5)	Osuna (21)	42,287	50–47	L5
98	July 20	@ Astros	1–6	Urquidy (1–0)	Jurado (5–6)	—	41,643	50–48	L6
99	July 21	@ Astros	3–5	Armenteros (1–0)	Lynn (12–6)	Osuna (22)	37,655	50–49	L7
100	July 22	@ Mariners	3–7	Gonzales (11–8)	Sampson (6–7)	Elías (12)	16,091	50–50	L8
101	July 23	@ Mariners	7–2	Payano (1–0)	Milone (1–5)	—	15,543	51–50	W1
102	July 24	@ Mariners	3–5	Leake (9–8)	Minor (8–6)	Elías (13)	28,163	51–51	L1
103	July 25	@ Athletics	11–3	Jurado (6–6)	Anderson (9–6)	—	11,854	52–51	W1
104	July 26	@ Athletics	5–2	Lynn (13–6)	Mengden (5–2)	Martin (4)	14,952	53–51	W2
105	July 27	@ Athletics	4–5	Bailey (9–7)	Sampson (6–8)	Hendriks (9)	36,468	53–52	L1
106	July 28	@ Athletics	5–6	Treinen (4–3)	Leclerc (1–3)	—	18,906	53–53	L2
107	July 30	Mariners	5–8	Tuivailala (1–0)	Martin (1–2)	Elías (14)	20,599	53–54	L3
108	July 31	Mariners	9–7	Minor (9–6)	LeBlanc (6–4)	Chavez (1)	22,539	54–54	W1

August: 13–16 (Home: 8–6; Away: 5–10)

#	Date	Opponent	Score	Win	Loss	Save	Attendance	Record	Streak
109	August 2	Tigers	5–4	Lynn (14–6)	Alexander (0–2)	Leclerc (6)	26,884	55–54	W2
110	August 3	Tigers	5–4 (10)	Leclerc (2–3)	Ramirez (5–4)	—	30,292	56–54	W3
111	August 4	Tigers	9–4	Montero (1–0)	Cisnero (0–3)	—	18,531	57–54	W4
112	August 5	@ Indians	1–0	Minor (10–6)	Civale (1–1)	Leclerc (7)	17,690	58–54	W5
–	August 6	@ Indians	Postponed (inclement weather); Rescheduled for August 7 as part of a doubleheader.						
113	August 7 (1)	@ Indians	0–2	Goody (3–0)	Jurado (6–7)	Hand (28)	35,041	58–55	L1
114	August 7 (2)	@ Indians	1–5	Cole (3–1)	Lynn (14–7)	Wittgren (3)	24,888	58–56	L2
115	August 9	@ Brewers	5–6	Hader (2–5)	Clase (0–1)	—	35,294	58–57	L3
116	August 10	@ Brewers	2–3	Houser (5–5)	Payano (1–1)	Albers (3)	41,903	58–58	L4
117	August 11	@ Brewers	1–0	Minor (11–6)	Lyles (7–8)	Leclerc (8)	44,411	59–58	W1
118	August 12	@ Blue Jays	4–19	Stewart (2–0)	Jurado (6–8)	—	16,492	59–59	L1
119	August 13	@ Blue Jays	0–3	Pannone (3–5)	Lynn (14–8)	Giles (16)	22,958	59–60	L2
120	August 14	@ Blue Jays	7–3	Allard (1–0)	Reid-Foley (2–3)	—	34,666	60–60	W1
121	August 15	Twins	6–13	Pineda (8–5)	Payano (1–2)	Smeltzer (1)	20,494	60–61	L1
122	August 16	Twins	3–4	Duffey (3–1)	Minor (11–7)	Romo (20)	24,742	60–62	L2
123	August 17	Twins	7–12	Duffey (4–1)	Jurado (6–9)	—	30,136	60–63	L3
124	August 18	Twins	3–6	Dyson (5–1)	Clase (0–2)	Rogers (19)	18,500	60–64	L4
125	August 19	Angels	8–7 (11)	Montero (2–0)	Ramirez (4–2)	—	17,326	61–64	W1
126	August 20 (1)	Angels	1–5	Heaney (3–3)	Palumbo (0–2)	—	17,429	61–65	L1
127	August 20 (2)	Angels	3–2 (11)	Clase (1–2)	Buttrey (6–6)	—	15,638	62–65	W1
128	August 21	Angels	8–7	Hernández (1–0)	Cahill (3–8)	—	19,565	63–65	W2
129	August 22	@ White Sox	1–6	Detwiler (2–3)	Jurado (6–10)	—	18,563	63–66	L1
130	August 23	@ White Sox	3–8	Cease (3–6)	Lynn (14–9)	—	27,016	63–67	L2
131	August 24	@ White Sox	4–0	Allard (2–0)	Nova (9–10)	—	26,454	64–67	W1
132	August 25	@ White Sox	0–2	López (8–11)	Burke (0–1)	Colomé (25)	25,553	64–68	L1
133	August 27	@ Angels	2–5	Del Pozo (1–0)	Minor (11–8)	Robles (19)	39,008	64–69	L2
134	August 28	@ Angels	3–0	Jurado (7–10)	Del Pozo (1–1)	Leclerc (9)	37,535	65–69	W1
135	August 29	Mariners	3–5	Magill (4–1)	Leclerc (2–4)	—	16,591	65–70	L1
136	August 30	Mariners	6–3	Allard (3–0)	Gonzales (4–11)	Clase (1)	23,563	66–70	W1
137	August 31	Mariners	3–2	Clase (2–2)	Magill (4–2)	—	33,668	67–70	W2

September: 11–14 (Home: 5–8; Away: 6–6)

#	Date	Opponent	Score	Win	Loss	Save	Attendance	Record	Streak
138	September 1	Mariners	3–11	Kikuchi (6–9)	Martin (1–3)	—	22,116	67–71	L1
139	September 2	@ Yankees	7–0	Minor (12–8)	Tanaka (10–8)	—	40,015	68–71	W1
140	September 3	@ Yankees	1–10	Paxton (12–6)	Vólquez (0–1)	—	33,711	68–72	L1
141	September 4	@ Yankees	1–4	Cessa (2–1)	Lynn (14–10)	—	35,082	68–73	L2
142	September 5	@ Orioles	3–1	Allard (4–0)	Means (10–10)	Leclerc (10)	8,209	69–73	W1
143	September 6	@ Orioles	7–6	Martin (2–3)	Fry (1–8)	Leclerc (11)	10,596	70–73	W2
144	September 7	@ Orioles	9–4	Méndez (1–0)	Brooks (4–8)	—	11,796	71–73	W3
145	September 8	@ Orioles	10–4	Minor (13–8)	Wojciechowski (2–8)	—	16,142	72–73	W4
146	September 10	Rays	3–5 (11)	Pagán (4–2)	Clase (2–3)	Fairbanks (1)	18,467	72–74	L1
147	September 11	Rays	10–9	Gibaut (1–0)	Poche (4–5)	Leclerc (12)	19,746	73–74	W1
148	September 12	Rays	6–4	Farrell (1–0)	McKay (2–4)	Leclerc (13)	18,222	74–74	W2
149	September 13	Athletics	9–14	Wendelken (2–1)	Gibaut (1–1)	—	27,813	74–75	L1
150	September 14	Athletics	6–8	Buchter (1–1)	Minor (13–9)	Hendriks (22)	31,928	74–76	L2
151	September 15	Athletics	1–6	Manaea (2–0)	Hernández (1–1)	Luzardo (1)	26,064	74–77	L3
152	September 17	@ Astros	1–4	Verlander (19–6)	Lynn (14–11)	Osuna (34)	39,650	74–78	L4
153	September 18	@ Astros	2–3	Cole (18–5)	Allard (4–1)	Osuna (35)	38,417	74–79	L5
154	September 20	@ Athletics	0–8	Fiers (15–4)	Minor (13–10)	—	29,579	74–80	L6
155	September 21	@ Athletics	3–12	Manaea (3–0)	Burke (0–2)	—	29,896	74–81	L7
156	September 22	@ Athletics	8–3	Lynn (15–11)	Roark (10–9)	—	38,453	75–81	W1
157	September 24	Red Sox	10–12	Rodríguez (19–6)	Jurado (7–11)	Workman (16)	23,341	75–82	L1
158	September 25	Red Sox	3–10	Porcello (14–12)	Allard (4–2)	—	29,290	75–83	L2
159	September 26	Red Sox	7–5	Minor (14–10)	Weber (2–4)	Leclerc (14)	24,612	76–83	W1
160	September 27	Yankees	7–14	Tarpley (1–0)	Palumbo (0–3)	—	35,168	76–84	L1
161	September 28	Yankees	9–4	Hernández (2–1)	Severino (1–1)	—	42,870	77–84	W1
162	September 29	Yankees	6–1	Lynn (16–11)	Tanaka (11–9)	—	47,144	78–84	W2

=== Detailed records ===
American League
Opponent	Home	Away	Total	Pct.	Runs scored	Runs allowed
AL East
Baltimore Orioles	2–1	4–0	6–1	.857	46	31
Boston Red Sox	1–2	2–2	3–4	.429	42	46
New York Yankees	2–1	1–2	3–3	.500	31	29
Tampa Bay Rays	2–1	1–2	3–3	.500	28	29
Toronto Blue Jays	2–1	1–2	3–3	.500	29	33
	9–6	9–8	18–14	.563	176	168
AL Central
Chicago White Sox	2–1	1–3	3–4	.429	25	30
Cleveland Indians	2–2	1–2	3–4	.429	20	31
Detroit Tigers	3–0	3–0	6–0	1.000	31	17
Kansas City Royals	3–1	2–1	5–2	.714	46	22
Minnesota Twins	0–4	1–2	1–6	.143	33	58
	10–8	8–8	18–16	.529	155	158
AL West
Houston Astros	6–4	0–9	6–13	.316	54	82
Los Angeles Angels	7–3	3–6	10–9	.526	89	87
Oakland Athletics	3–6	3–7	6–13	.316	101	125
Seattle Mariners	6–3	5–5	11–8	.579	98	88
Texas Rangers	—	—	—	—	—	—
	22–16	11–27	33–43	.434	342	382

National League
Opponent	Home	Away	Total	Pct.	Runs scored	Runs allowed
Arizona Diamondbacks	0–2	1–1	1–3	.250	15	35
Chicago Cubs	2–1	0–0	2–1	.667	23	28
Cincinnati Reds	0–0	2–1	2–1	.667	14	15
Milwaukee Brewers	0–0	1–2	1–2	.333	8	9
Pittsburgh Pirates	0–2	1–1	1–3	.250	22	24
St. Louis Cardinals	2–1	0–0	2–1	.667	14	15
	4–6	5–5	9–11	.450	96	123

== Roster ==
2019 Texas Rangers
Roster
Pitchers: 39 Kolby Allard; 44 Jesse Biddle; 55 Kyle Bird; 70 Brock Burke; 49 David Carpenter; 53 Jesse Chavez; 43 Emmanuel Clase; 43 Kyle Dowdy; 46 Peter Fairbanks; 60 Luke Farrell; 63 Ian Gibaut; 46 Jeanmar Gómez; 46 Taylor Guerrieri; 63 Taylor Hearn; 72 Jonathan Hernández; 68 Wei-Chieh Huang; 57 Ariel Jurado; 27 Shawn Kelley; 25 José Leclerc; 35 Lance Lynn; 59 Brett Martin; 31 Chris Martin; 65 Yohander Méndez; 19 Shelby Miller; 23 Mike Minor; 48 Rafael Montero; 62 Joe Palumbo; 51 Pedro Payano; 52 Adrian Sampson; 33 Drew Smyly; 54 Jeffrey Springs; 45 Locke St. John; 67 Phillips Valdez; 36 Edinson Vólquez	Catchers: 50 Tim Federowicz; 9 Isiah Kiner-Falefa; 2 Jeff Mathis; 56 Jose Trevino; Infielders: 1 Elvis Andrus; 14 Asdrúbal Cabrera; 41 Logan Forsythe; 11 Ronald Guzmán; 12 Rougned Odor; 38 Danny Santana; 15 Nick Solak; 21 Patrick Wisdom	Outfielders: 5 Willie Calhoun; 17 Shin-Soo Choo; 3 Delino DeShields; 13 Joey Gallo; 16 Scott Heineman; 30 Nomar Mazara; 24 Hunter Pence	Manager: 8 Chris Woodward; Coaches: 37 Tony Beasley (third base); 61 Callix Crabbe (assistant hitting); 66 Josh Frasier (bullpen catcher); 58 Oscar Marin (bullpen); 4 Héctor Ortiz (first base); 18 Luis Ortiz (hitting); 47 Julio Rangel (pitching); 32 Jayce Tingler (player development field coordinator); 22 Don Wakamatsu (bench)

== Player stats ==
=== Batting ===
Note: G = Games played; AB = At bats; R = Runs; H = Hits; 2B = Doubles; 3B = Triples; HR = Home runs; RBI = Runs batted in; SB = Stolen bases; BB = Walks; AVG = Batting average; SLG = Slugging average

Player	G	AB	R	H	2B	3B	HR	RBI	SB	BB	AVG	SLG
Elvis Andrus	147	600	81	165	27	4	12	72	31	34	.275	.393
Shin-Soo Choo	151	563	93	149	31	2	24	61	15	78	.265	.455
Rougned Odor	145	522	77	107	30	1	30	93	11	52	.205	.439
Danny Santana	130	474	81	134	23	6	28	81	21	25	.283	.534
Nomar Mazara	116	429	69	115	27	1	19	66	4	28	.268	.469
Delino DeShields Jr.	118	357	42	89	15	4	4	32	24	38	.249	.347
Asdrúbal Cabrera	93	323	45	76	15	0	12	51	4	38	.235	.393
Logan Forsythe	101	317	38	72	17	1	17	39	2	44	.227	.353
Willie Calhoun	83	309	51	83	14	1	21	48	0	23	.269	.524
Hunter Pence	83	286	53	85	17	1	18	59	6	26	.297	.552
Ronald Guzmán	87	256	34	56	20	0	10	36	1	32	.219	.414
Joey Gallo	70	241	54	61	15	1	22	49	4	52	.253	.598
Jeff Mathis	86	228	17	36	9	0	2	12	1	15	.158	.224
Isiah Kiner-Falefa	65	202	23	48	12	1	1	21	3	14	.238	.322
Jose Trevino	40	120	18	31	9	0	2	13	0	3	.258	.383
Nick Solak	33	116	19	34	6	1	5	17	2	15	.293	.491
Scott Heineman	25	75	8	16	6	0	2	7	1	9	.213	.373
Tim Federowicz	29	75	6	12	2	0	4	7	1	5	.160	.347
Patrick Wisdom	9	26	1	4	1	0	0	1	0	1	.154	.192
Pitcher totals	162	21	0	1	0	0	0	0	0	2	.048	.048
Team totals	162	5540	810	1374	296	24	223	765	131	534	.248	.431

=== Pitching ===
Note: W = Wins; L = Losses; ERA = Earned run average; G = Games pitched; GS = Games started; SV = Saves; IP = Innings pitched; H = Hits allowed; R = Runs allowed; ER = Earned runs allowed; BB = Walks allowed; SO = Strikeouts

Player	W	L	ERA	G	GS	SV	IP	H	R	ER	BB	SO
Mike Minor	14	10	3.59	32	32	0	208.1	190	86	83	68	200
Lance Lynn	16	11	3.67	33	33	0	208.1	195	89	85	59	246
Adrian Sampson	6	8	5.89	35	15	0	125.1	156	86	82	36	101
Ariel Jurado	7	11	5.81	32	18	0	122.1	148	94	79	36	81
Jesse Chavez	3	5	4.85	48	9	1	78.0	82	48	42	22	72
José Leclerc	2	4	4.33	70	3	14	68.2	52	34	33	39	100
Brett Martin	2	3	4.76	51	2	0	62.1	72	38	33	18	62
Drew Smyly	1	5	8.42	13	9	1	51.1	64	49	48	34	52
Shawn Kelley	5	2	4.94	50	0	11	47.1	55	27	26	11	43
Kolby Allard	4	2	4.96	9	9	0	45.1	52	26	25	19	33
Shelby Miller	1	3	8.59	19	8	0	44.0	58	46	42	29	30
Chris Martin	0	2	3.08	38	0	4	38.0	35	13	13	4	43
Jeffrey Springs	4	1	6.40	25	0	0	32.1	38	23	23	23	32
Rafael Montero	2	0	2.48	22	0	0	29.0	23	8	8	5	34
Brock Burke	0	2	7.43	6	6	0	26.2	30	22	22	11	14
Taylor Guerrieri	0	0	5.81	20	0	0	26.1	26	19	17	22	27
Emmanuel Clase	2	3	2.31	21	1	1	23.1	20	8	6	6	21
Kyle Dowdy	2	1	7.25	13	1	0	22.1	26	20	18	18	17
Pedro Payano	1	2	5.73	6	4	0	22.0	26	17	14	15	17
Joe Palumbo	0	3	9.18	7	4	0	16.2	21	17	17	8	21
Jonathan Hernández	2	1	4.32	9	2	0	16.2	14	10	8	13	19
Phillips Valdéz	0	0	3.94	11	0	0	16.0	17	7	7	9	18
Edinson Vólquez	0	1	6.75	11	4	0	16.0	20	12	12	12	10
Jeanmar Gómez	1	0	8.22	16	0	0	15.1	23	15	14	6	10
Luke Farrell	1	0	2.70	9	1	0	13.1	6	4	4	3	12
Kyle Bird	0	0	7.82	12	0	1	12.2	11	11	11	15	10
Ian Gibaut	1	1	5.11	9	0	0	12.1	11	7	7	8	14
Pete Fairbanks	0	2	9.35	8	0	0	8.2	8	10	9	7	15
Locke St. John	0	0	5.40	7	0	0	6.2	7	4	4	4	5
Wei-Chieh Huang	0	0	3.18	4	0	0	5.2	8	5	2	5	2
Jesse Biddle	0	0	11.81	4	0	0	5.1	4	8	7	5	7
Yohander Méndez	1	0	5.79	3	0	0	4.2	4	3	3	5	8
David Carpenter	0	0	5.40	4	0	0	3.1	4	4	2	4	2
Jeff Mathis	0	0	9.00	2	0	0	2.0	3	2	2	0	1
Tim Federowicz	0	0	9.00	1	0	0	1.0	3	1	1	0	0
Taylor Hearn	0	1	108.00	1	1	0	0.1	3	5	4	4	0
Team totals	78	84	5.06	162	162	33	1438.0	1515	878	808	583	1379

== Farm system ==
Level	Team	League	Manager
AAA	Nashville Sounds	Pacific Coast League	Jason Wood
AA	Frisco RoughRiders	Texas League	Joe Mikulik
A-Advanced	Down East Wood Ducks	Carolina League	Corey Ragsdale
A	Hickory Crawdads	South Atlantic League	Matt Hagen
A-Short Season	Spokane Indians	Northwest League	Kenny Hook
Rookie	AZL Rangers	Arizona League	Carlos Cardoza
Rookie	DSL Rangers 1	Dominican Summer League	Alexis Infante
Rookie	DSL Rangers 2	Dominican Summer League	Carlos Maldonado
