= Chris Martin (baseball) =

American baseball player (born 1986)

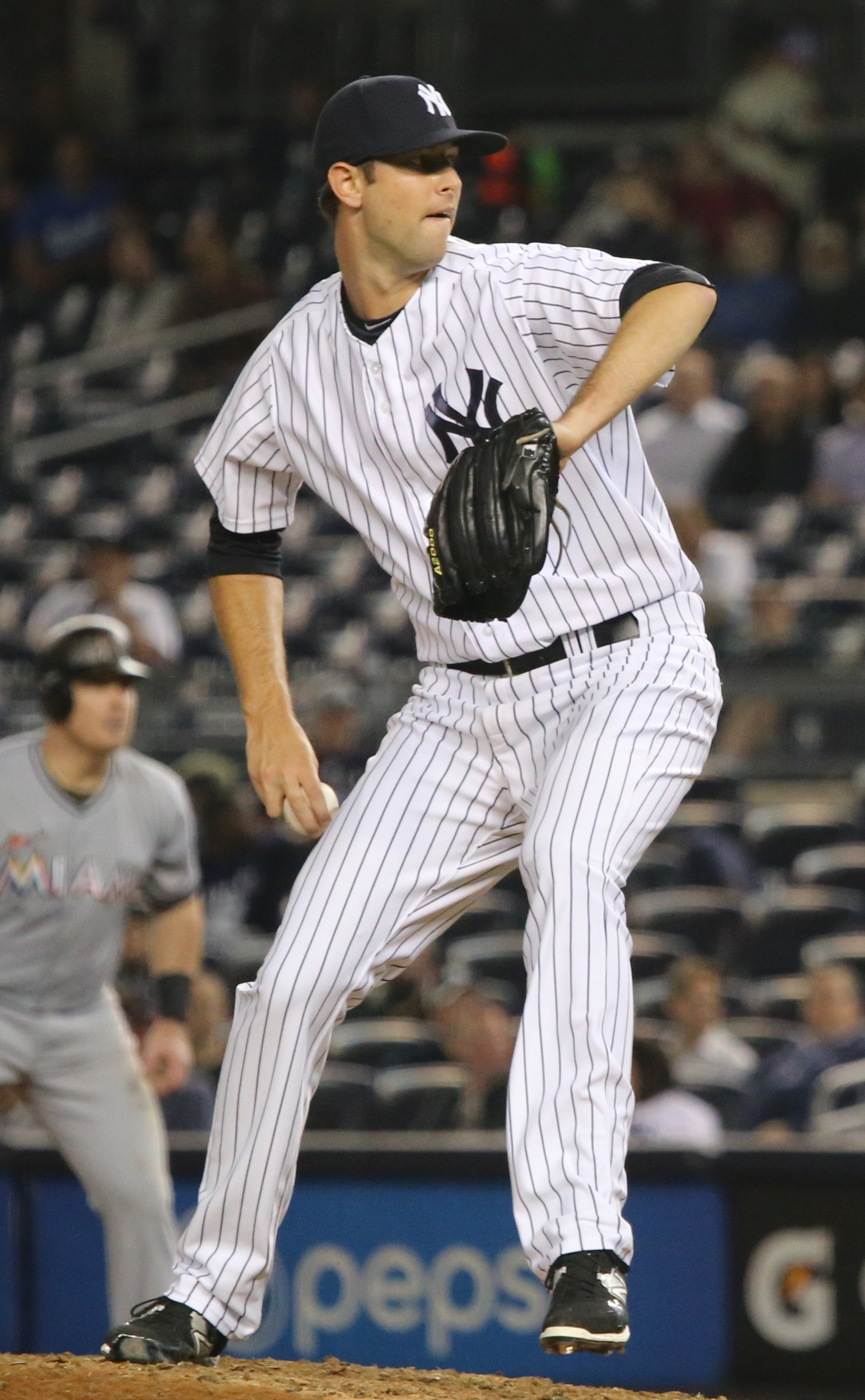
- Martin with the New York Yankees in 2015
- Pitcher
- Born: June 2, 1986 (age 40); Arlington, Texas, U.S.
- Batted: Right Threw: Right

Professional debut
- MLB: April 26, 2014, for the Colorado Rockies
- NPB: March 26, 2016, for the Hokkaido Nippon Ham Fighters

Last appearance
- MLB: July 11, 2026, for the Texas Rangers
- NPB: September 27, 2017, for the Hokkaido Nippon Ham Fighters

MLB statistics
- Win–loss record: 19–25
- Earned run average: 3.53
- Strikeouts: 409

NPB statistics
- Win–loss record: 2–2
- Earned run average: 1.12
- Strikeouts: 91
- Stats at Baseball Reference

Teams
- Colorado Rockies (2014); New York Yankees (2015); Hokkaido Nippon Ham Fighters (2016–2017); Texas Rangers (2018–2019); Atlanta Braves (2019–2021); Chicago Cubs (2022); Los Angeles Dodgers (2022); Boston Red Sox (2023–2024); Texas Rangers (2025–2026)

Career highlights and awards
- Japan Series champion (2016); World Series champion (2021)

Christopher Riley Martin (born June 2, 1986) is a American former professional baseball pitcher. He has previously played in Major League Baseball (MLB) for the Colorado Rockies, New York Yankees, Texas Rangers, Atlanta Braves, Chicago Cubs, Los Angeles Dodgers, and Boston Red Sox, and in Nippon Professional Baseball (NPB) for the Hokkaido Nippon-Ham Fighters.

Martin played baseball at Arlington High School and McLennan Community College, but gave up on baseball after he suffered a shoulder injury. After working in a warehouse for three years, Martin began playing catch, and felt strong enough to try out for independent league baseball. After he pitched for the Grand Prairie AirHogs in 2010, the Boston Red Sox of MLB signed Martin in 2011. He pitched in Minor League Baseball for the Red Sox organization, until they traded him to the Rockies after the 2013 season.

Martin made his MLB debut for the Rockies in 2014, and was traded to the Yankees after the season. He signed with the Fighters after the 2015 season, and won the 2016 Japan Series with the Fighters. He signed with the Rangers after the 2017 season. The Rangers traded Martin to the Braves during the 2019 season, and he was a part of the 2021 World Series championship team.

== Amateur career ==
Martin attended Arlington High School in Arlington, Texas, where he pitched for the school's baseball team. In 2004, his senior year, the Texas High School Baseball Coaches Association named Martin to its Class 5A All-State team. The Detroit Tigers of Major League Baseball (MLB) selected him in the 18th round of the 2004 MLB draft, but Martin did not sign a professional contract.

Martin enrolled at McLennan Community College, where he played college baseball for the McLennan Highlanders. After his freshman year at McLennan, he received interest from the college baseball programs representing the University of Oklahoma and the University of Texas at Austin. However, he did not have enough course credits to transfer.

The Colorado Rockies of MLB selected Martin in the 21st round of the 2005 MLB draft. He returned to McLennan for his sophomore season, with the Rockies following his progress while deciding whether or not to offer him a contract. Martin suffered a shoulder injury while pitching for McLennan as a sophomore, and the Rockies opted not to offer him a contract. Martin was diagnosed with a torn labrum in the shoulder of his pitching arm, and he underwent surgery to correct it.

== Professional career ==
=== Independent leagues ===
Martin was not selected in the 2006 MLB draft. After graduating from McLennan, Martin signed with the Fort Worth Cats of the United League Baseball, which is independent of MLB, for the 2007 season. Though Martin made the team out of their tryout camp, he did not pitch in a game for the Cats due to discomfort in his shoulder. A doctor recommended Martin undergo surgery to repair the labrum and the articular capsule of the humerus. Rather than undergo surgery, Martin quit professional baseball. He went to work loading trucks for UPS at Dallas/Fort Worth International Airport, moving refrigerators for Lowe's, and stocking washing machines and clothes dryers in an appliance warehouse in Arlington.

Martin and Jordan Bostick, a coworker in the warehouse and a former high school baseball teammate, began playing catch in the warehouse. Martin noticed that his shoulder felt stronger, and with encouragement from Bostick, he agreed to attempt to play professional baseball again.

In 2010, after three years out of baseball, Martin tried out with the Grand Prairie AirHogs of the independent American Association of Independent Professional Baseball. Martin threw fastballs at 95 miles per hour (153 km/h) before he was pulled aside by Pete Incaviglia, the AirHogs manager, and signed to a contract. He made his debut for the AirHogs that night. He had a 4–0 win–loss record and a 1.96 earned run average (ERA) for the AirHogs.

=== Boston Red Sox ===
Incaviglia started contacting MLB teams to promote Martin. Before the 2011 season, the Boston Red Sox offered him a tryout during spring training. After practicing at their training facility, the Red Sox signed Martin to a minor league contract. The Red Sox assigned Martin to the Greenville Drive of the Single-A South Atlantic League to begin the 2011 season. Later in the year, the Red Sox promoted Martin to the Salem Red Sox of the High-A Carolina League and then the Portland Sea Dogs of the Double-A Eastern League. Across the three levels, Martin had a 6–2 win–loss record and 2.55 ERA in 23 appearances.

The Red Sox assigned Martin to Portland in 2012. He began the season as a starting pitcher, but was moved back to a relief role later in the season. He ended the 2012 season with a 4.48 ERA. In 2013, Martin worked exclusively in relief. He had a 5–3 win–loss record with a 2.25 ERA and five saves in 42 games pitched, split between Portland and the Pawtucket Red Sox of the Triple-A International League during the 2013 season.

=== Colorado Rockies ===
After the 2013 season, the Red Sox traded Martin, along with pitcher Franklin Morales, to the Colorado Rockies in exchange for infielder Jonathan Herrera. The Rockies insisted on Martin's inclusion in the trade. Martin began the 2014 season with the Colorado Springs Sky Sox of the Triple-A Pacific Coast League.

The Rockies promoted Martin to the major leagues for the first time on April 25, 2014. Martin made his major league debut on April 26, pitching a scoreless inning against the Los Angeles Dodgers. He pitched a total of 15 2/3 innings for Colorado, recording a 6.89 ERA while striking out 14 and allowing 22 hits, before the Rockies demoted Martin to Colorado Springs in June. He pitched the rest of the season for Colorado Springs, where he had a 4.39 ERA.

During the 2014–15 offseason, the Rockies agreed to sign Nick Hundley. The Rockies designated Martin for assignment on January 5, 2015, in order to remove him from their 40-man roster, so that the Rockies could sign Hundley.

=== New York Yankees ===
The Rockies traded Martin to the New York Yankees on January 13, 2015, receiving cash considerations. Martin competed for a spot in the Yankees' bullpen in spring training, and was named to the Yankees' Opening Day roster.

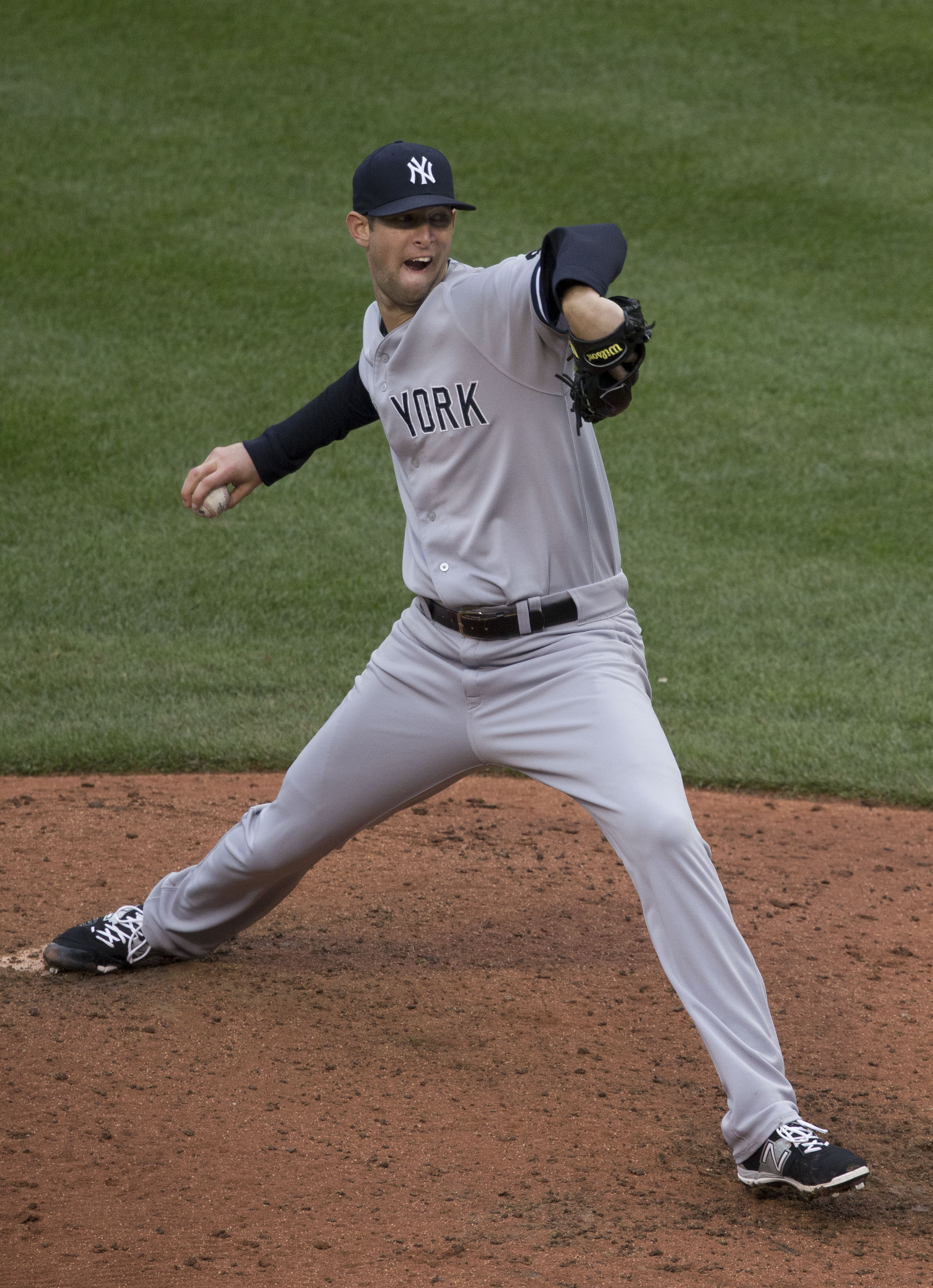
Martin pitching for the Yankees on October 3, 2015

On April 28, 2015, Martin recorded his first career save in a 4–2 victory over the Tampa Bay Rays. Martin began the season with a 0–1 record and a 3.55 ERA in 12 2/3 innings pitched across 15 appearances, before he went on the disabled list on May 9 due to tendinitis in his right elbow. The Yankees activated Martin from the disabled list on May 31, and optioned him to the Scranton/Wilkes-Barre RailRiders of the International League. The Yankees recalled Martin from the minor leagues on June 11 to fill in for the injured Andrew Miller, and optioned him back to Scranton/Wilkes-Barre on June 19. He finished the 2015 season with a 0–2 record and a 5.66 ERA in 24 games pitched for the Yankees.

=== Hokkaido Nippon-Ham Fighters ===
After the 2015 season, the Yankees sold the contractual rights to Martin to the Hokkaido Nippon-Ham Fighters of Nippon Professional Baseball's Pacific League for $750,000. At the time, he had a career 6.19 ERA in 36 1/3 innings in MLB and a .318 batting average against.

Martin succeeded Hirotoshi Masui in the role of closing pitcher for the Fighters in 2016. He made the Pacific League All-Star team, but injured his ankle in September. Martin missed the end of the regular season and the 2016 Japan Series, which the Fighters won. He finished the 2016 season with a 1.07 ERA and 21 saves. He appeared in 52 games, which was a personal single-season best.

The Fighters re-signed Martin for the 2017 season for ¥100 million (approximately US$891,535). He had a 1.19 ERA in 40 appearances with the Fighters in 2017. Between his two seasons in Japan, Martin struck out 91 batters and walked 13 in 88 1/3 innings. He credited his time with Hokkaido for helping him learn how to prepare himself between appearances with less input from coaches. He also learned how to throw a split-finger fastball from teammate Shohei Ohtani.

=== Texas Rangers ===
On December 15, 2017, Martin signed a two-year, $4 million contract with the Texas Rangers. He recorded a 4.54 ERA in 41 2/3 innings pitched in 2018. After the 2018 season, Martin represented MLB in the 2018 MLB Japan All-Star Series from November 8–15. When Rangers' closer Shawn Kelley went on the injured list in May 2019, Martin filled in for him. Martin and José Leclerc received save opportunities when Kelley was injured in July. For the Rangers in 2019, Martin had a 3.08 ERA in 38 appearances; from May 24 to July 30, he had a 1.45 ERA.

=== Atlanta Braves ===
On July 30, the day before the 2019 trade deadline, the Rangers traded Martin to the Atlanta Braves in exchange for Kolby Allard. On September 11, Martin pitched an immaculate inning in the bottom of the seventh against the Philadelphia Phillies. He had a 4.08 ERA with Atlanta in 20 games after the trade, finishing the season with a 3.40 ERA and four saves in 58 total appearances. The Braves included Martin on their roster for the 2019 National League Division Series, but he injured an oblique muscle while warming up in Game 1 and was removed from the roster.

A free agent after the 2019 season, Martin re-signed with Atlanta on a two-year contract worth $14 million on November 19. In the pandemic-shortened 2020 season, he pitched to a 1.00 ERA in 19 relief appearances spanning 18 innings. In 2021, Martin had a 3.95 ERA in 46 relief appearances. During the 2021 postseason, Martin had a 2.08 ERA in five appearances as the Braves won the 2021 World Series.

=== Chicago Cubs ===
On March 17, 2022, Martin signed a one-year contract with the Chicago Cubs worth $2.5 million, with additional achievable incentives. Martin appeared in 34 games for the Cubs, recording a 4.31 ERA in 31 1/3 innings. He recorded a 3.29 ERA in his appearances after June 17.

=== Los Angeles Dodgers ===
On July 30, 2022, the Cubs traded Martin to the Los Angeles Dodgers in exchange for Zach McKinstry. He pitched 24 2/3 innings over 26 games and finished 3–1 with a 1.46 ERA.

=== Boston Red Sox (second stint) ===
On December 8, 2022, Martin signed a two-year contract with the Boston Red Sox. He started the 2023 season as a member of Boston's bullpen, and spent two weeks during the second half of April on the injured list. Martin served as an effective reliever for the Red Sox, posting a 4–1 record with a 1.05 ERA in 55 appearances before being placed on the injured list on September 28 due to a viral infection.

=== Texas Rangers (second stint) ===
On January 6, 2025, Martin signed a one-year, $5.5 million contract with the Texas Rangers. In a 2–1 loss to the Detroit Tigers on July 21, Martin suffered a left calf strain and was placed on the injured list. Martin returned from the injured list on September 1, earning the victory in relief during a 7–5 extra innings win over the Arizona Diamondbacks. In 49 total appearances for Texas, he compiled a 2–6 record and 2.98 ERA with 43 strikeouts and two saves across 42 1/3 innings pitched.

On December 19, 2025, Martin re-signed with the Rangers on a one-year, $4 million contract. In 16 appearances for Texas, he struggled to a 9.00 ERA with nine strikeouts over 14 innings of work. On August 3, 2026, Martin was designated for assignment by the Rangers. He was released by Texas after clearing waivers on August 8.

On November 11, 2026, Martin announced his retirement from professional baseball.

== Pitching style ==
Martin is listed at 6 feet 8 inches (2.03 m) and 215 pounds (98 kg). He throws a fastball that averages 95 miles per hour (153 km/h). He also throws a slider, a splitter, and a cut fastball. He has exceptional control, walking just 1.1 batters per 9 innings over the course of his career.

== Personal life ==
Martin is the youngest of four children born to Connie and Matt Martin. His three older siblings, Crystal, Jonathan, and Shannon, all played baseball or softball when they were growing up. Crystal played softball at the collegiate level for the Texas A&M Aggies as their shortstop, and was named an All-Big 12 Conference selection during her collegiate career.

== See also ==
- List of Major League Baseball single-inning strikeout leaders
