= Brock Burke =

American baseball player (born 1996)

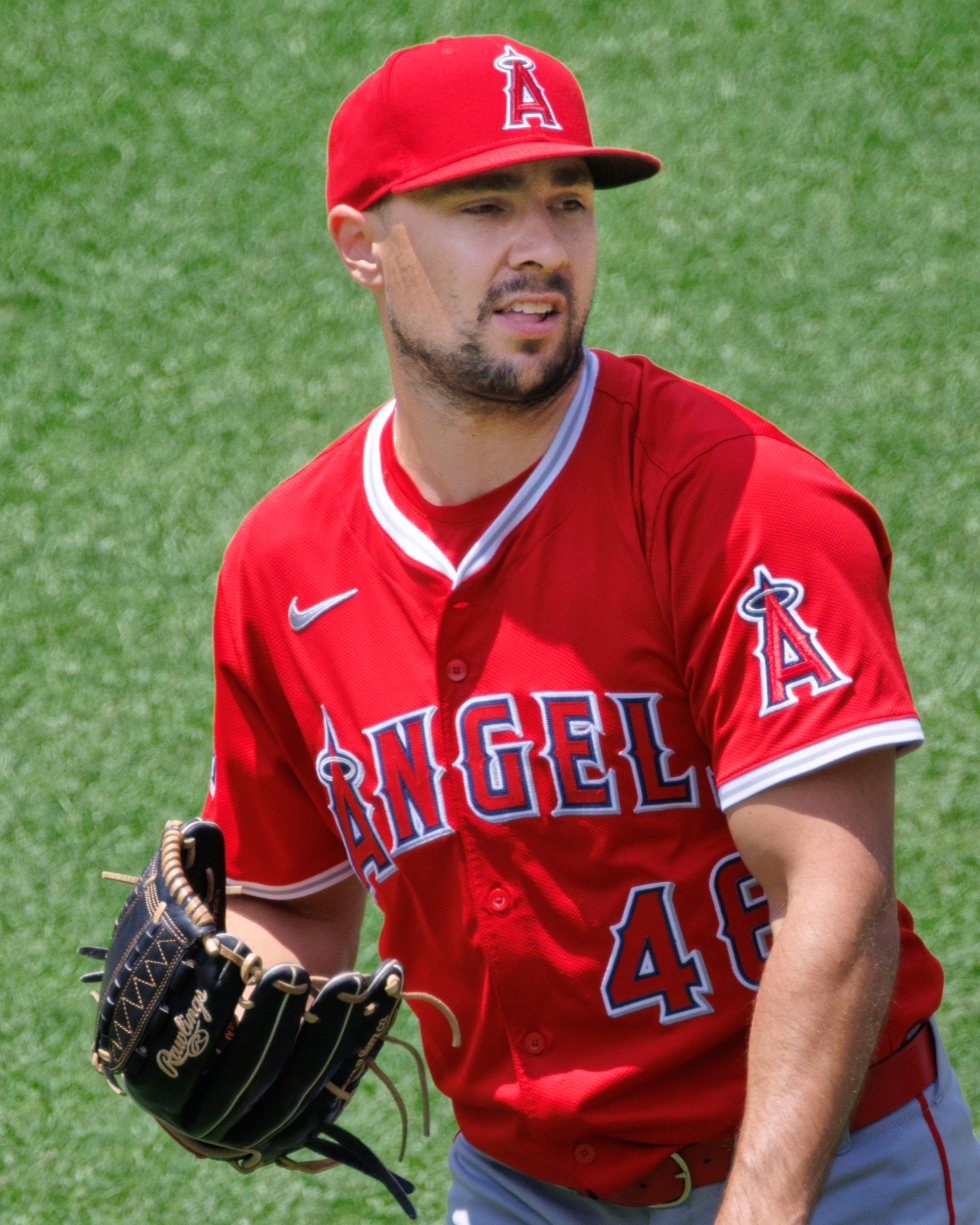
- Burke with the Los Angeles Angels in 2025

Free agent
- Pitcher
- Born: August 4, 1996 (age 30); Chicago, Illinois, U.S.
- Bats: Left Throws: Left

MLB debut
- August 20, 2019, for the Texas Rangers

MLB statistics (through 2026 season)
- Win–loss record: 27–17
- Earned run average: 3.53
- Strikeouts: 323
- Stats at Baseball Reference

Teams
- Texas Rangers (2019, 2022–2024); Los Angeles Angels (2024–2025); Cincinnati Reds (2026)

Career highlights and awards
- World Series champion (2023)

Brock Christopher Burke (born August 4, 1996) is an American professional baseball pitcher who is a free agent. He has played in Major League Baseball (MLB) for the Texas Rangers, Los Angeles Angels, and Cincinnati Reds.

== Career ==
=== Amateur career ===
Burke attended Evergreen High School in Evergreen, Colorado. In his senior year, he struck out 20 batters in a game against Eaglecrest High School at Coors Field. He committed to attend the University of Oregon.

=== Tampa Bay Rays ===
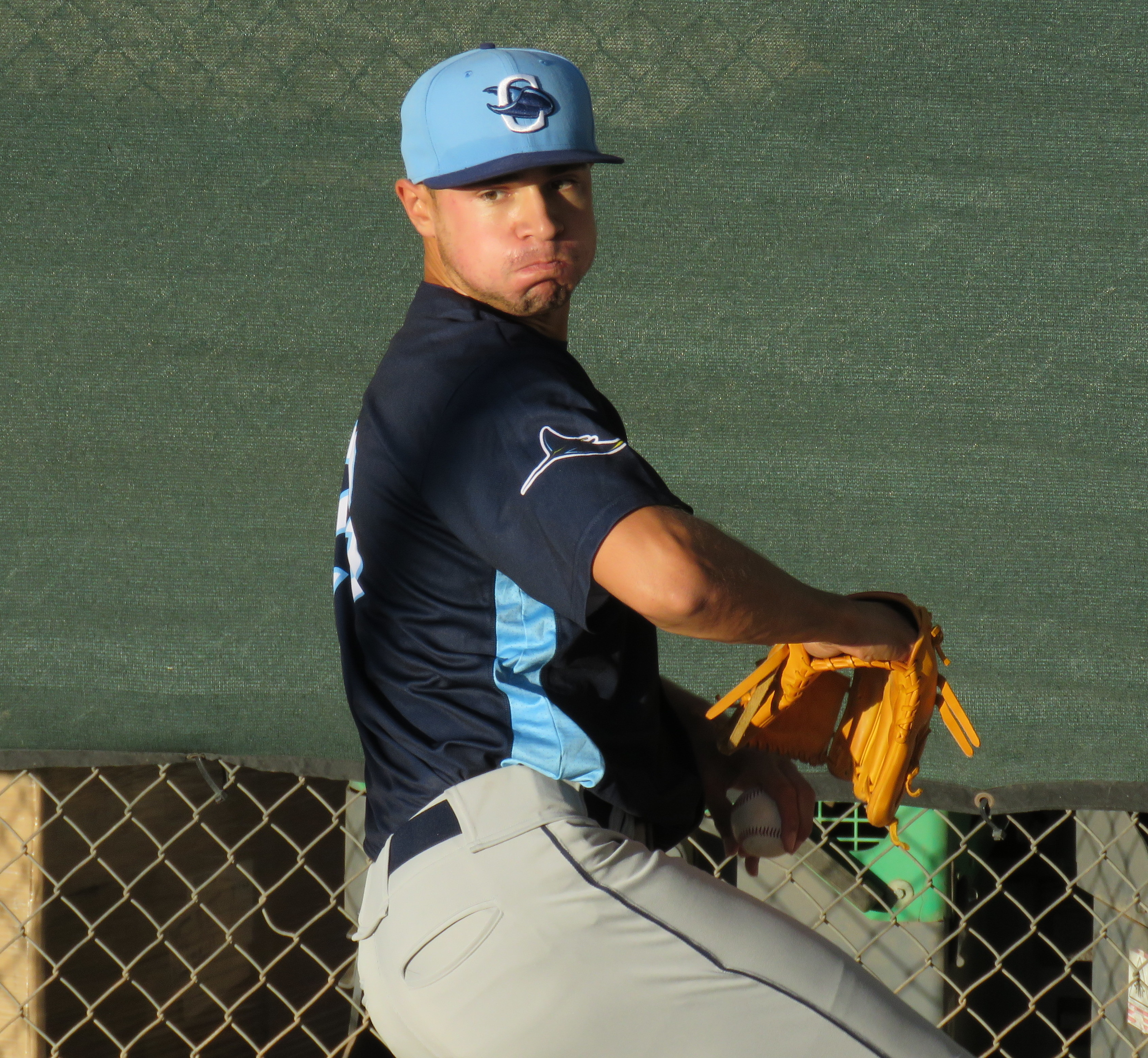
Burke with the Charlotte Stone Crabs

The Rays selected him in the third round, with the 96th overall selection, of the 2014 MLB draft. He signed for an above slot $897,500 signing bonus. He made his professional debut in 2014 for the Gulf Coast Rays, going 0–3 with a 10.80 ERA in 13 1/3 innings pitched. Burke spent 2015 with the Princeton Rays where he went 4–2 with a 3.42 ERA in 11 starts, and 2016 with the Hudson Valley Renegades where he pitched to a 3–3 record and a 3.39 ERA in 13 starts.

Burke began the 2017 season with the Bowling Green Hot Rods, and was promoted to the Charlotte Stone Crabs during the season. In 23 starts between the two teams, he went 11–6 with a 2.99 ERA. In 2018, he pitched for both Charlotte and the Montgomery Biscuits, compiling a combined 9–6 record and 3.08 ERA 25 games (22 starts). The Rays added Burke to their 40-man roster after the 2018 season.

=== Texas Rangers ===
On December 21, 2018, the Texas Rangers acquired Burke from the Rays as part of a three team deal in which the Rangers also acquired Kyle Bird, Yoel Espinal, Eli White, and $750,000 of international signing bonus pool space, the Rays acquired Emilio Pagan, Rollie Lacy, and a competitive balance pick in the 2019 MLB draft (Seth Johnson), and the Oakland Athletics acquired Jurickson Profar.

In 2019, Burke was optioned to the Frisco RoughRiders of the Double-A Texas League to open the season. Burke was placed on the injured list on April 23 due to shoulder fatigue and blister issues. He made one start each for the AZL Rangers and the Hickory Crawdads, before returning to Frisco on June 26. With Frisco, he went 3–5 with a 3.18 ERA in 45 innings. On August 6, Burke was promoted to the Nashville Sounds of the Triple-A Pacific Coast League. He made two starts for Nashville, allowing 7 runs over 8 innings.

On August 20, 2019, the Rangers promoted Burke to the major leagues. He made his major league debut that night versus the Los Angeles Angels, recording four strikeouts over six scoreless innings. With Texas in 2019, Burke went 0–2 with a 7.43 ERA over 26 2/3 innings. Burke missed the entire 2020 season, after undergoing surgery to repair a torn labrum in his left shoulder in February 2020. Burke spent 2021 season with the Round Rock Express of the Triple-A West, going 1–5 with a 5.68 ERA and 97 strikeouts over 77 2/3 innings.

Burke made the Rangers 2022 Opening Day roster as a relief pitcher. Burke's 2022 season was a breakout in performance and health. He posted a 7–5 record with a 1.97 ERA and 90 strikeouts over 82 1/3 innings. He was named the Texas Rangers Rookie of the Year by the DFW area BBWAA. In 2023, Burke made 53 appearances out of the bullpen, registering a 4.37 ERA with 52 strikeouts across 59 2/3 innings of work.

Burke began the 2024 season in Texas' bullpen, but struggled to a 15.00 ERA across five appearances. On April 12, 2024, following a poor outing against the Houston Astros, he punched a wall in frustration and suffered a fractured right hand. On April 19, Burke underwent surgery to repair the injury, which was diagnosed as a fractured metacarpal. He was activated from the injured list on June 12. He was optioned to Triple-A Round Rock on June 30 to make room for Jonathan Ornelas. In 13 games for Texas, Burke struggled to a 9.22 ERA with 16 strikeouts across 13 2/3 innings pitched. Burke was designated for assignment by the Rangers on August 11.

=== Los Angeles Angels ===
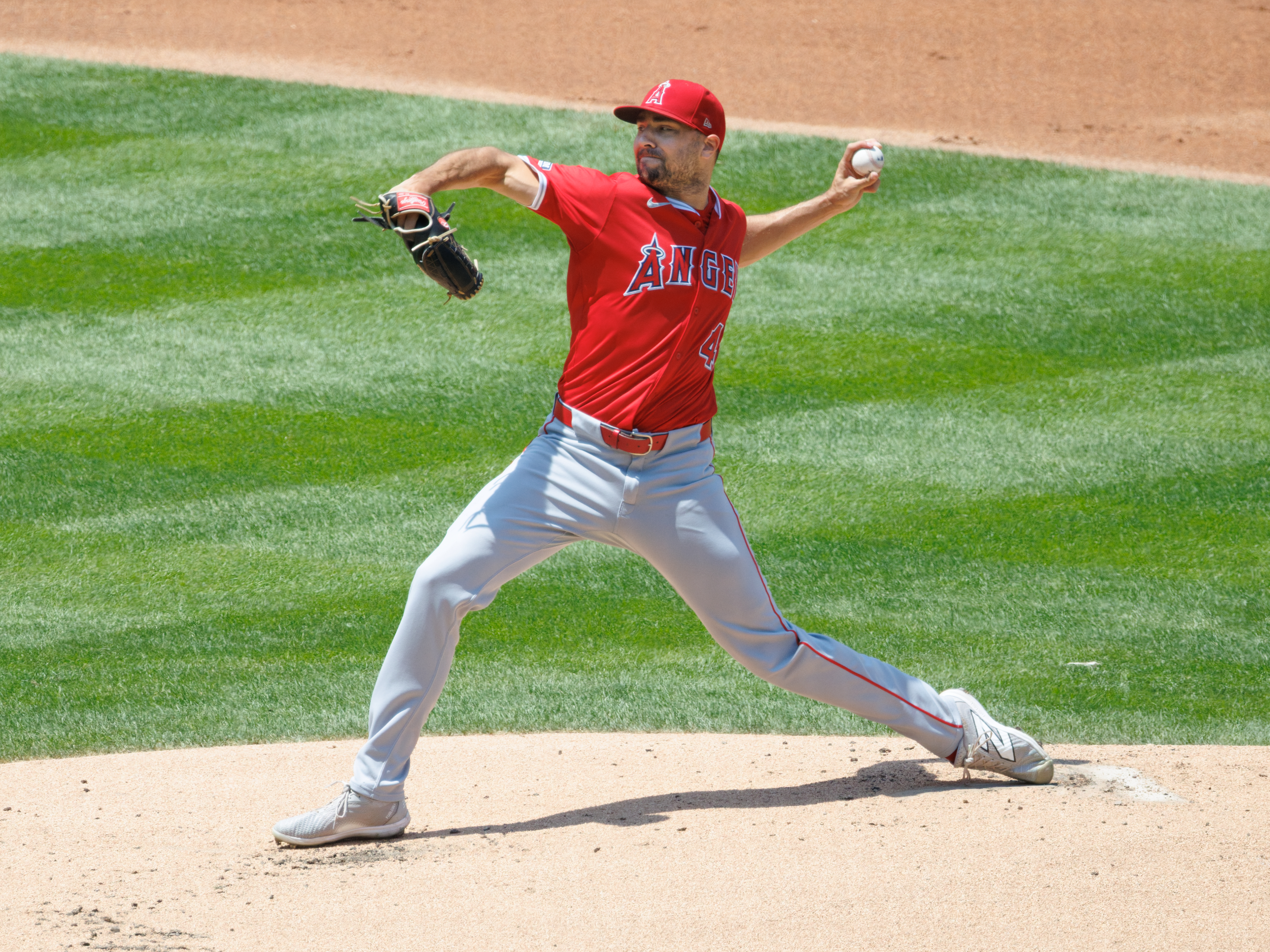
Burke with the Angels in 2025

On August 13, 2024, Burke was claimed off waivers by the Los Angeles Angels. The Angels had Burke shift 8 inches (200 mm) from the third base side of the pitching rubber towards the center, and had a 3.54 ERA over 20 1/3 innings for the Angels.

Burke made 69 appearances (one start) for Los Angeles during the 2025 season, compiling a 7-1 record and 3.36 ERA with 52 strikeouts across 61 2/3 innings pitched.

=== Cincinnati Reds ===
On January 16, 2026, the Angels sent Burke to the Cincinnati Reds in a three-team trade in which the Reds sent Gavin Lux to the Tampa Bay Rays and the Rays sent Josh Lowe to the Angels.

== Personal life ==
Burke has suffered from somnambulism (sleepwalking) his entire life. On multiple occasions while in the minor leagues, Burke was witnessed by different roommates waking up suddenly during the night and acting out in various ways.
