= Ariel Jurado =

Panamanian baseball player (born 1996)

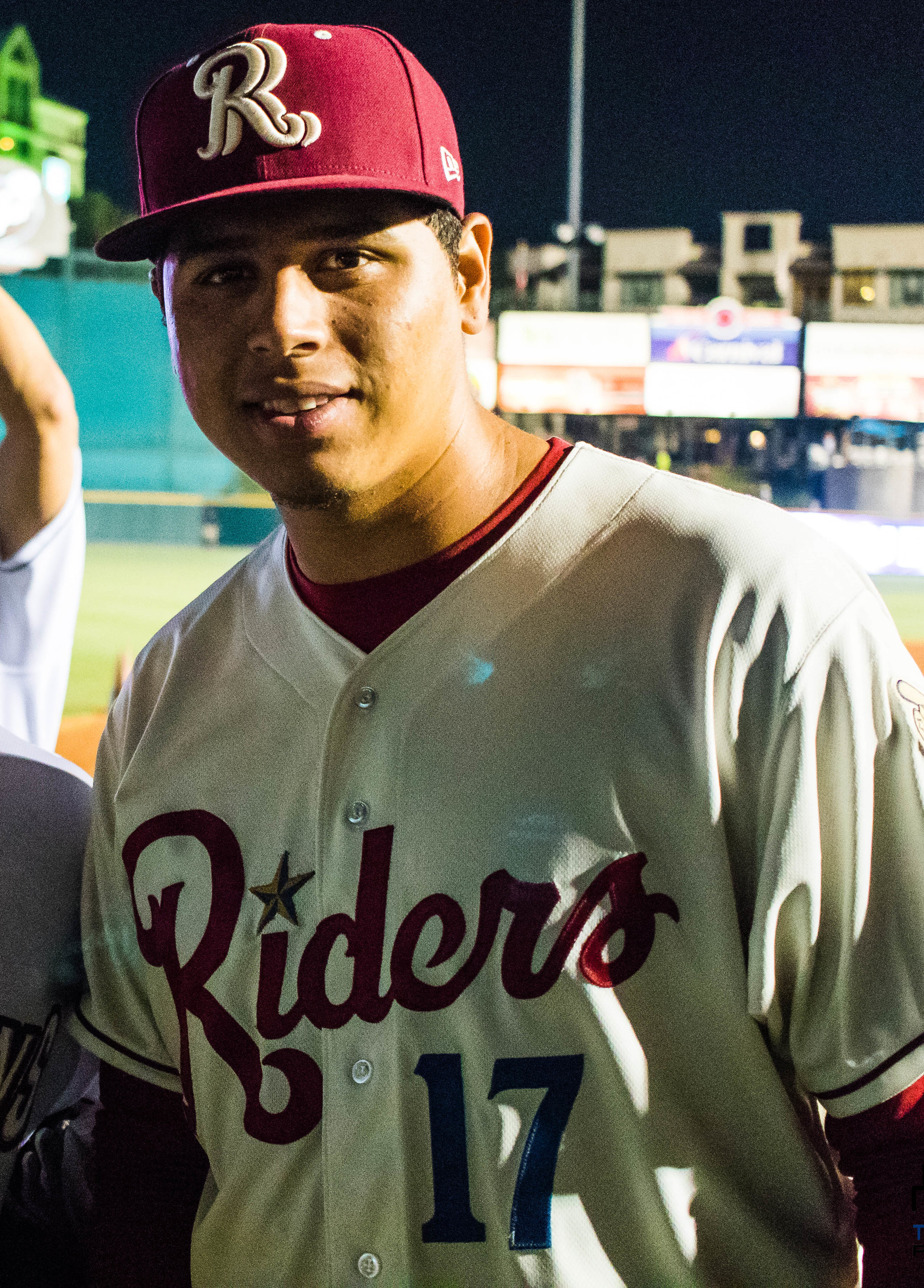
- Jurado with the Frisco RoughRiders at the Texas League All-Star Game in 2017

Samsung Lions – No. 75
- Pitcher
- Born: January 30, 1996 (age 30); Aguadulce, Panama
- Bats: Right Throws: Right

Professional debut
- MLB: May 19, 2018, for the Texas Rangers
- KBO: April 4, 2023, for the Kiwoom Heroes

MLB statistics (through 2020 season)
- Win–loss record: 12–16
- Earned run average: 5.97
- Strikeouts: 105

KBO statistics (through July 7, 2026)
- Win–loss record: 41–25
- Earned run average: 2.91
- Strikeouts: 527
- Stats at Baseball Reference

Teams
- Texas Rangers (2018–2019); New York Mets (2020); Kiwoom Heroes (2023–2024); Samsung Lions (2025–present)

Career highlights and awards
- Korean Series champion (2026)

Ariel Bolívar Jurado Agrazal (born January 30, 1996) is a Panamanian professional baseball pitcher for the Samsung Lions of the KBO League. He has previously played in Major League Baseball (MLB) for the Texas Rangers and New York Mets, and in the KBO League for the Kiwoom Heroes.

== Professional career ==
=== Texas Rangers ===
Jurado signed with the Texas Rangers as an international free agent in December 2012. He made his professional debut in 2013 with the Rookie-level DSL Rangers and spent the whole season there, going 6–0 with a 2.39 ERA in nine starts. In 2014 he played for the Rookie-level AZL Rangers, going 2–1 with a 1.63 ERA in 38 2/3 innings pitched. Jurado spent 2015 with the Hickory Crawdads of the Single–A South Atlantic League, and was named the Nolan Ryan Minor League Pitcher of the Year by the Rangers after going 12–1 with a 2.45 earned run average (ERA) with 95 strikeouts and only 12 walks in 99 innings. In 2016, he pitched with both the High Desert Mavericks of the High–A California League and the Frisco RoughRiders of the Double-A Texas League, combining to go 8–6 and 3.66 ERA in 123 innings. He returned to Frisco in 2017, where he posted a 9–11 record and a 4.59 ERA over 157 innings.

The Rangers added Jurado to their 40-man roster after the 2017 season. Jurado returned to Frisco to open the 2018 season and posted a 5–3 record with a 3.28 ERA and 58 strikeouts in 101 2/3 innings for them.

Jurado made his Major League debut on May 19, 2018, at Guaranteed Rate Field against the Chicago White Sox. He pitched 4 2/3 innings, giving up four earned runs on six hits, two walks, and two strikeouts, earning the loss as the White Sox defeated the Rangers 5–3. He finished his rookie season after going 5–5 with a 5.93 ERA in 54 2/3 innings for the Rangers. Left-handed batters had a higher batting average against him, .365 (in 20 or more innings), than against all other MLB pitchers.

In 2019, Jurado was optioned to the Nashville Sounds of the Triple-A Pacific Coast League to open the season, and went 3–0 with a 3.57 ERA over 22 2/3 innings for them. With Texas in 2019, Jurado went 7–11 with a 5.81 ERA in 122 1/3 innings.

Jurado was designated for assignment by the Rangers on July 31, 2020.

=== New York Mets ===
Jurado was traded to the New York Mets on August 5, 2020, in exchange for Stephen Villines and cash considerations. He was sent to the Mets alternate site in Brooklyn. On December 2, Jurado was nontendered by the Mets.

=== Minnesota Twins ===
Jurado underwent Tommy John surgery in January 2021 and missed the entire 2021 season. On March 20, 2022, Jurado signed a minor league contract with the Minnesota Twins organization. After recovering from surgery, he spent the remainder of the year with the Triple–A St. Paul Saints, also appearing in one game for the Single–A Fort Myers Miracle. In 14 appearances for the Saints, Jurado recorded a 3.54 ERA with 44 strikeouts across 53 1/3 innings pitched. He elected free agency following the season on November 10.

=== Kiwoom Heroes ===
On November 25, 2022, Jurado signed a one-year contract with the Kiwoom Heroes of the KBO League for a total of $1 million, including an annual salary of $850,000 and an option of $150,000. In 30 starts for the Heroes in 2023, he posted an 11–8 record and 2.65 ERA with 147 strikeouts across 183 2/3 innings of work.

On December 22, 2023, Jurado re–signed with Kiwoom on a one–year, $1.2 million contract. In 30 starts for the Heroes in 2024, he posted a 10–8 record with a 3.36 ERA and 169 strikeouts across 190 2/3 innings. Jurado became a free agent following the season.

=== Samsung Lions ===
On December 6, 2024, Jurado signed a one-year, $1 million contract with the Samsung Lions of the KBO League. He made 30 starts for Samsung in 2025, compiling a 15–8 record and 2.60 ERA with 142 strikeouts across 197 1/3 innings pitched.

On November 25, 2025, Jurado re-signed with the Lions on a one-year, $1.6 million contract.

== International career ==
Jurado was selected to represent Panama at the 2023 World Baseball Classic qualification.
