= Pedro Payano =

Dominican-American baseball player (born 1994)

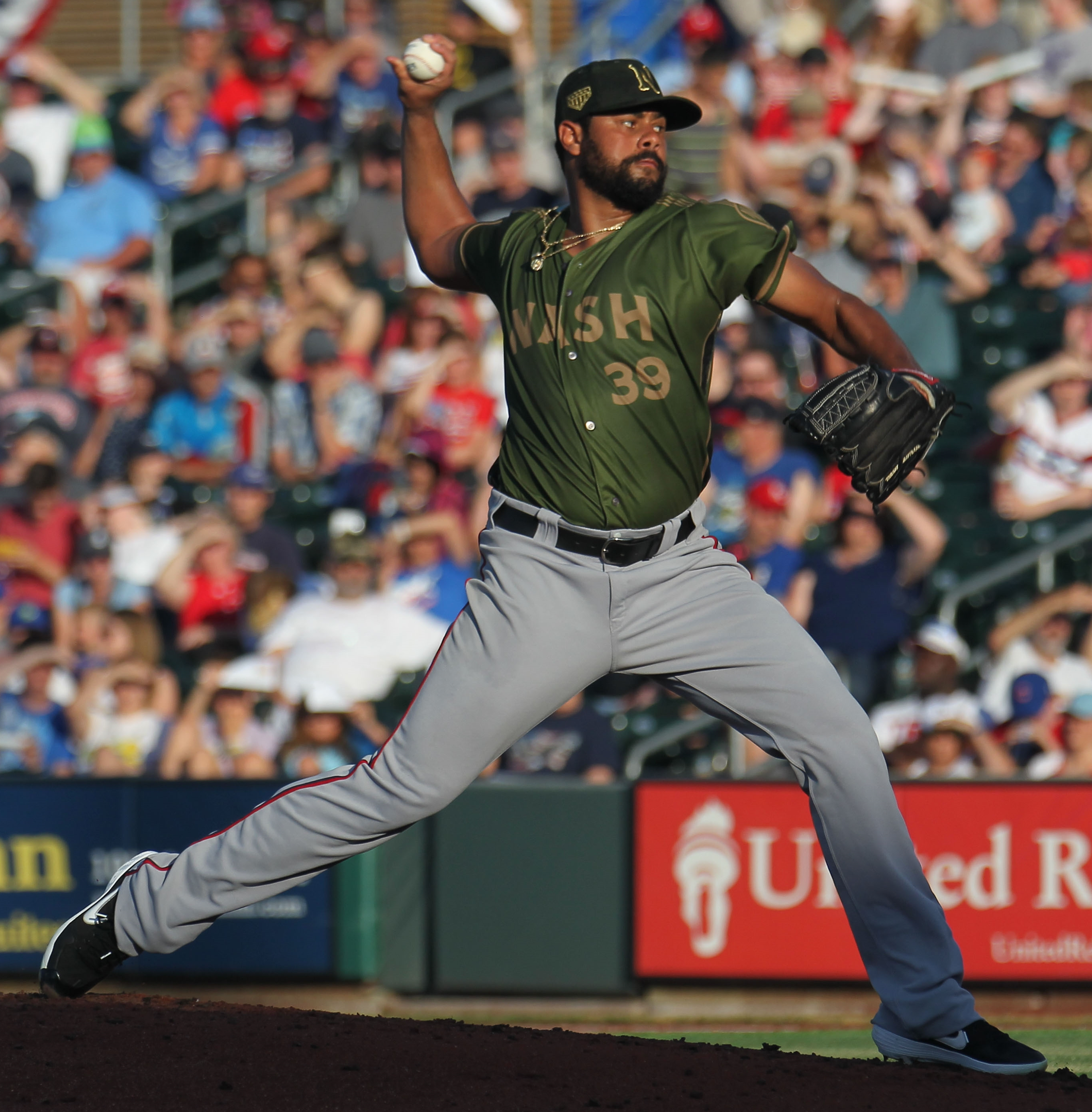
- Payano with the Nashville Sounds in 2019

Staten Island FerryHawks
- Pitcher
- Born: September 27, 1994 (age 31); New York City, New York, U.S.
- Bats: Right Throws: Right

MLB debut
- July 6, 2019, for the Texas Rangers

MLB statistics (through 2019 season)
- Win–loss record: 1–2
- Earned run average: 5.73
- Strikeouts: 17
- Stats at Baseball Reference

Teams
- Texas Rangers (2019)

Pedro Julio Payano (born September 27, 1994) is a Dominican-American professional baseball pitcher for the Staten Island FerryHawks of the Atlantic League of Professional Baseball. He has previously played in Major League Baseball (MLB) for the Texas Rangers.

== Career ==
=== Texas Rangers ===
Payano was born in New York City but raised in San Francisco de Macorís, Dominican Republic. He signed with the Texas Rangers as an international free agent on June 1, 2012.

Payano spent the 2012, 2013, and 2014 seasons playing for the DSL Rangers of the Rookie-level Dominican Summer League. In 2015, he split the season between the DSL Rangers, AZL Rangers of the Rookie-level Arizona League, and the Hickory Crawdads of the Single–A South Atlantic League, posting a combined 10–2 record with a 1.11 ERA over 87 innings. His 2016 season was spent with Hickory, going 3–3 with a 2.08 ERA in 73 2/3 innings. He split 2017 between the Down East Wood Ducks of the High–A Carolina League and the Frisco RoughRiders of the Double–A Texas League, going 6–8 with a 3.87 ERA over 134 1/3 innings. He spent the 2018 season with Frisco, going 5–10 with a 5.54 ERA over 118 2/3 innings. He elected free agency on November 2, 2018, but re-signed with Texas on a minor league contract. He opened the 2019 season back with Frisco, before being promoted to the Nashville Sounds of the Triple-A Pacific Coast League on May 29. Payano combined for a 5–4 record with a 4.93 ERA over 83 1/3 innings between the two levels.

On July 6, 2019, the Rangers selected Payano's contract and promoted him to the major leagues. He made his debut that day, pitching a scoreless inning in relief. In 2019, Payano produced a 1–2 record with a 5.73 ERA in 22 MLB innings. Payano was designated for assignment on September 1 and was outrighted to Nashville on September 3. He elected free agency following the season on November 4.

=== New York Mets ===
On December 12, 2019, Payano signed a minor league contract with the New York Mets organization. He did not play in a game in 2020 due to the cancellation of the minor league season because of the COVID-19 pandemic. Payano was released on September 5, 2020.

=== Detroit Tigers ===
On February 8, 2021, Payano signed a minor league contract with the Detroit Tigers organization. Payano made 25 appearances (24 starts) between the Double-A Erie SeaWolves and the Triple-A Toledo Mud Hens, registering a cumulative 8–8 record and 4.65 ERA with 117 strikeouts in 124.0 innings pitched. He elected free agency following the season on November 7.

=== Cincinnati Reds ===
On February 1, 2022, Payano signed a minor league contract with the Cincinnati Reds. Payano pitched in 50 games for the Triple-A Louisville Bats, posting a 2–4 record and 3.26 ERA with 62 strikeouts in 60 2/3 innings of work. He elected free agency following the season on November 10.

=== Staten Island FerryHawks ===
On April 19, 2023, Payano signed with the Staten Island FerryHawks of the Atlantic League of Professional Baseball. In 22 games for Staten Island, Payano recorded a 1.99 ERA with 20 strikeouts and 5 saves in 22 2/3 innings pitched.

=== Leones de Yucatán ===
On July 6, 2023, Payano's contract was purchased by the Leones de Yucatán of the Mexican League. In 5 appearances down the stretch, he recorded a 5.79 ERA with 5 strikeouts across 4 2/3 innings pitched.

Payano made 14 appearances for the Leones in 2024, struggling to an 8.76 ERA with 10 strikeouts across 12 1/3 innings of work. He was released by Yucatán on June 16, 2024.

=== Tigres de Quintana Roo ===
On June 24, 2024, Payano signed with the Tigres de Quintana Roo of the Mexican League. In 18 appearances for the Tigres, he posted a 1–0 record and 3.06 ERA with 15 strikeouts across 17 2/3 innings pitched.

Payano made 40 appearances for Quintana Roo in 2025, compiling a 2-1 record and 4.91 ERA with 33 strikeouts across 36 2/3 innings of relief. Payano was released by the Tigres on November 24, 2025.

=== Staten Island FerryHawks (second stint) ===
On June 24, 2026, Payano signed with the Staten Island FerryHawks of the Atlantic League of Professional Baseball.
