= Adrian Sampson =

American baseball player (born 1991)

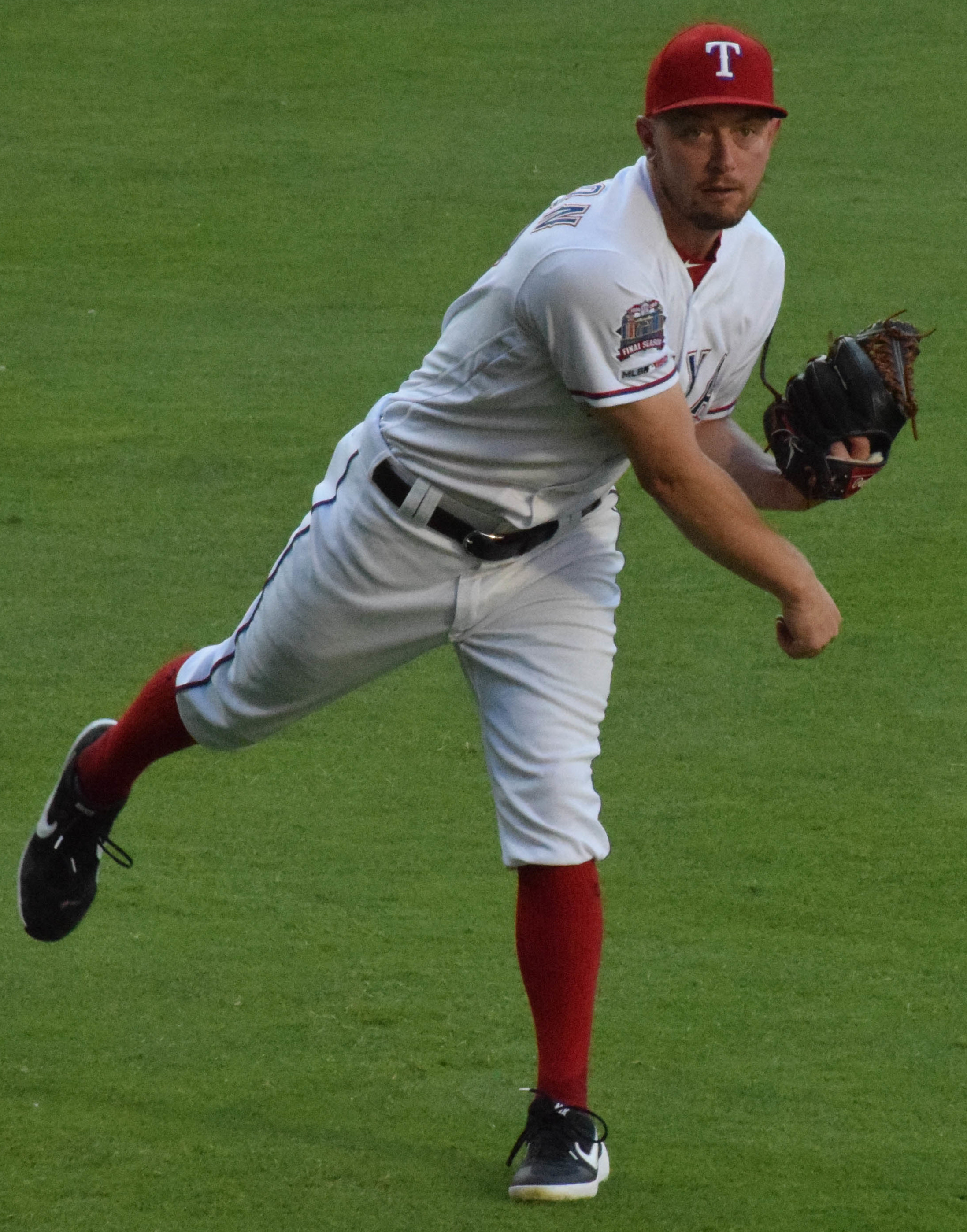
- Sampson with the Texas Rangers in 2019

Free agent
- Pitcher
- Born: October 7, 1991 (age 34); Redmond, Washington, U.S.
- Bats: Right Throws: Right

Professional debut
- MLB: June 18, 2016, for the Seattle Mariners
- KBO: May 28, 2020, for the Lotte Giants

MLB statistics (through 2022 season)
- Win–loss record: 11–19
- Earned run average: 4.43
- Strikeouts: 219

KBO statistics (through 2020 season)
- Win–loss record: 9–12
- Earned run average: 5.40
- Strikeouts: 87
- Stats at Baseball Reference

Teams
- Seattle Mariners (2016); Texas Rangers (2018–2019); Lotte Giants (2020); Chicago Cubs (2021–2022)

Adrian David Sampson (born October 7, 1991) is an American professional baseball pitcher who is a free agent. He has previously played in Major League Baseball (MLB) for the Seattle Mariners, Texas Rangers, and Chicago Cubs, and in the KBO League for the Lotte Giants.

== High school and college ==
Sampson attended Skyline High School in Sammamish, Washington. In July 2009, Sampson had Tommy John surgery, which caused him to miss his senior season. After not receiving any college baseball scholarships, Sampson attended Bellevue College. After going 4–2 with a 2.36 earned run average (ERA), Sampson was drafted by the Florida Marlins in the 16th round of the 2011 Major League Baseball draft. He did not sign with the Marlins and returned to Bellevue. In 2012, he went 13–0 with a 1.36 ERA and 107 strikeouts.

== Professional career ==
=== Pittsburgh Pirates ===
Sampson was drafted by the Pittsburgh Pirates in the fifth round of the 2012 Major League Baseball draft and signed with the Pirates. He made his professional debut that season with the State College Spikes. He started nine of 11 games and had a 2.95 ERA.

Sampson played the 2013 season with the Bradenton Marauders, finishing 5-8 with a 5.14 ERA in 140 innings. He started the 2014 season with the Altoona Curve. In July he was selected to play in the Eastern League All-Star Game, but was forced to sit out the game by the Pirates. In August he was promoted to the Triple-A Indianapolis Indians after posting a 2.55 ERA with Altoona. Overall, he went 11–6 with a 2.96 ERA and 109 strikeouts.

=== Seattle Mariners ===
On July 31, 2015, Sampson was traded to the Seattle Mariners in exchange for J. A. Happ. He spent the remainder of the year with the Triple-A Tacoma Rainiers, making seven starts and struggling to a 2-4 record and 7.28 ERA with 28 strikeouts across 38 1/3 innings pitched.

Sampson made his Major League debut on June 18, 2016, against the Boston Red Sox, relieving the injured Wade Miley. Scheduled to replace Miley in the rotation, Sampson suffered a torn flexor tendon while warming up before his first major league start five days later against the Detroit Tigers, which required season-ending surgery later that month.

=== Texas Rangers ===
On November 2, 2016, the Texas Rangers claimed Sampson off of waivers. In 2017, Sampson rehabbed from the torn flexor tendon injury and made eight minor league appearances that season, going 2-2 with a 3.45 ERA and 21 strikeouts in 31 1/3 innings with the rookie-level Arizona League Rangers, High-A Down East Wood Ducks, and Triple-A Round Rock Express.

Sampson spent the first 5 months of the 2018 season with Triple-A Round Rock, going 8-4 with a 3.77 ERA and 85 strikeouts across 126 2/3 innings pitched. Sampson was recalled by Texas on September 4, 2018, and on September 11, Sampson made his first career start. He finished the year with a 0-3 record and a 4.30 ERA and 15 strikeouts over 23 innings of work. Sampson was non-tendered by Texas and became a free agent on November 30.

On December 27, 2018, Sampson re-signed with the Rangers on a minor league contract that included an invitation to spring training. Sampson was assigned to the Triple-A Nashville Sounds to begin the 2019 season. On April 1, 2019, the Rangers purchased Sampson's contract and recalled him to the major league roster. On June 8, he recorded his first career complete game versus the Oakland Athletics. Sampson finished the 2019 season going 6–8 with a 5.89 ERA and 101 strikeouts across 125 1/3 innings pitched.

=== Lotte Giants ===
On November 22, 2019, Sampson signed one-year contract with the Lotte Giants of the KBO League. He made 25 starts for the Giants in 2020, posting a 9-12 record and 5.40 ERA with 87 strikeouts over 130 innings of work. Sampson became a free agent following the season.

=== Chicago Cubs ===
On May 10, 2021, Sampson signed a minor league contract with the Chicago Cubs organization. With the Triple-A Iowa Cubs, he was 4-5 with a 4.96 ERA. On August 18, his contract was selected by the Cubs. Sampson pitched to a 2.80 ERA with 28 strikeouts in 10 appearances with Chicago. On November 5, Sampson was outrighted off of the 40-man roster.

Sampson returned to the Cubs organization, signing a minor league contract on March 19, 2022. On May 10, he was designated for assignment, and subsequently claimed via waivers by the Seattle Mariners three days later. Though Sampson was assigned to the Triple-A Tacoma Rainiers, he did not play for the team before being designated for assignment a second time on May 21. He cleared waivers and was sent outright to Triple-A on May 24, but rejected the outright assignment a day later and elected free agency. On May 31, Sampson re-signed with the Cubs on a minor league contract. On June 16, Sampson was selected back to the active roster. He made 21 appearances (19 starts) for Chicago in 2022, pitching to a 4–5 record and 3.11 ERA with 73 strikeouts in 104 1/3 innings of work.

On November 18, 2022, Sampson signed a one-year, $1.9 million contract with the Cubs, avoiding arbitration. In spring training in 2023, Sampson competed with Hayden Wesneski for the fifth starter role behind Marcus Stroman, Jameson Taillon, Drew Smyly, and Justin Steele. He was optioned to Triple-A Iowa on March 25, 2023, after manager David Ross announced Wesneski had won the job. Sampson made two starts for Iowa before undergoing a meniscal debridement surgery on his right knee on May 7. He was placed on the 60-day injured list on May 15. On July 24, Sampson was activated from the injured list. However, upon his activation, he was promptly removed from the 40–man roster and sent outright to Triple–A Iowa.

On August 1, 2023, the Cubs traded Sampson, Manuel Rodríguez, and international free agent bonus pool space to the Tampa Bay Rays in exchange for Josh Roberson. Sampson did not appear for the organization and was released two days later.

=== Texas Rangers (second stint) ===
On February 13, 2024, Sampson signed a minor league contract to return to the Texas Rangers organization. He made 28 appearances (27 starts) for the Triple-A Round Rock Express, compiling an 8-10 record and 5.64 ERA with 120 strikeouts across 137 1/3 innings pitched. Sampson elected free agency following the season on November 4.

=== Washington Nationals ===
On May 6, 2025, Sampson signed a minor league contract with the Washington Nationals. He made 19 starts split between the rookie-level Florida Complex League Nationals, Double-A Harrisburg Senators, and Triple-A Rochester Red Wings, accumulating a combined 6-5 record and 3.95 ERA with 65 strikeouts across 100 1/3 innings pitched. Sampson elected free agency following the season on November 6.
