= Joe Palumbo (baseball) =

American baseball player (born 1994)

Free agent
- Pitcher
- Born: October 26, 1994 (age 31); Stony Brook, New York, U.S.
- Bats: Left Throws: Left

MLB debut
- June 8, 2019, for the Texas Rangers

MLB statistics (through 2020 season)
- Win–loss record: 0–4
- Earned run average: 9.47
- Strikeouts: 26
- Stats at Baseball Reference

Teams
- Texas Rangers (2019–2020)

Joseph Anthony Palumbo Jr. (born October 26, 1994) is an American professional baseball pitcher who is a free agent. The Texas Rangers selected Palumbo in the 30th round of the 2013 MLB draft. and he made his Major League Baseball (MLB) debut for them in 2019.

== Amateur career ==
Palumbo transferred to St. John the Baptist Diocesan High School, in West Islip, New York after his sophomore year of high school. Due to institution age rules, he was forced to reclassify back to a sophomore and complete five years of high school. Due to New York State rules, he was deemed to have exhausted his eligibility after his junior year (his fourth season) and was made ineligible for his senior season. He instead pitched for the Long Island Black Sox, a local men's league baseball team, where he was seen by Rangers area scout Takeshi Sakurayama. The Texas Rangers selected Palumbo in the 30th round, with the 910th overall selection, of the 2013 MLB draft. He signed for a $32,000 signing bonus, forgoing a commitment to San Jacinto College.

== Professional career ==
=== Texas Rangers ===
After signing, he made his professional debut with the AZL Rangers of the Rookie-level Arizona League, going 1–1 with a 5.03 ERA in 19 2/3 innings pitched in which he struck out 22 batters. In 2014, he returned to the AZL Rangers and compiled a 4–4 record with 49 strikeouts and a 2.32 ERA over 42 2/3 innings in 14 games (seven starts). In 2015, he pitched for the Spokane Indians of the Low– Northwest League and the Hickory Crawdads of the Single–A South Atlantic League, pitching to a combined 3–3 record with a 3.07 ERA over 58 2/3 innings in 13 games (nine starts). Palumbo spent 2016 with Hickory where he posted a 7–5 record with 8 saves and a 2.24 ERA in 96 1/3 innings pitched with 122 strikeouts (11.4 strikeouts per 9 innings).

Palumbo began 2017 with the Down East Wood Ducks of the High–A Carolina League. After compiling a 0.66 ERA with 22 strikeouts over 13 2/3 innings in three starts, he underwent Tommy John surgery in April, and missed the remainder of the season. The Rangers added him to their 40-man roster after the 2017 season.

Palumbo rehabbed through Tommy John surgery in the first half of the 2018 season, returning to game action June 24. In a combined 11 starts between the AZL Rangers, Down East, and Frisco RoughRiders of the Double-A Texas League, he posted a 2–4 record with a 2.78 ERA and 59 strikeouts in 45 1/3 innings (11.7 strikeouts per 9 innings). He was named an MiLB 2018 Organization All Star. Palumbo was ranked as the #105 overall prospect in baseball by ESPN's Keith Law, on his just missed preseason 2019 Top 100 list.

In 2019, Palumbo split minor league time between Frisco and the Nashville Sounds of the Triple-A Pacific Coast League, going a combined 3–0 with a 3.01 ERA and 108 strikeouts over 80 2/3 innings (12.0 strikeouts per 9 innings). He was named an MiLB 2019 Organization All Star.

On June 8, he was promoted to the major leagues for the first time, to start versus the Oakland Athletics. In his debut, he allowed four runs over four innings of work, while recording four strikeouts. Palumbo missed over three weeks due to a blister suffered during a game on August 20. Palumbo finished the 2019 season going 0–3 with a 9.18 ERA and 21 strikeouts over 16 2/3 innings (11.3 strikeouts per 9 innings) for Texas.

Palumbo appeared in just two games for Texas in 2020, before missing the rest of the season after being diagnosed with ulcerative colitis. Palumbo played the 2021 season with the Round Rock Express of the Triple-A West league. Before suffering a season-ending back injury, Palumbo pitched only 6 2/3 innings.

=== San Francisco Giants ===
On November 5, 2021, Palumbo was claimed off waivers by the San Francisco Giants. Palumbo became a free agent on November 30 after he was non-tendered by the Giants.

On December 13, 2021, Palumbo re-signed with the Giants. He made 3 appearances for the Triple-A Sacramento River Cats, struggling immensely to the tune of a 33.75 ERA with one strikeouts in 1.1 innings pitched. On July 4, 2022, Palumbo was released by the Giants.

=== Texas Rangers (second stint) ===
On February 20, 2023, Palumbo signed a minor league contract with the Texas Rangers organization. He pitched in 3 games for the Triple-A Round Rock Express, recording a 9.00 ERA with no strikeouts in 2.0 innings of work. Palumbo was released by the Rangers on May 17.

=== Hagerstown Flying Boxcars ===
On February 22, 2024, it was announced that Palumbo would be signing with the Hagerstown Flying Boxcars for their inaugural season of play in the Atlantic League of Professional Baseball. In six starts for Hagerstown, he struggled to a 7.63 ERA with 15 strikeouts across 15 1/3 innings pitched. On June 5, Palumbo was released by the Flying Boxcars.

=== Long Island Ducks ===
On April 24, 2025, Palumbo signed with the Long Island Ducks of the Atlantic League of Professional Baseball. He made one appearance for Long Island, allowing three runs on two hits with two walks across 1/3 of an inning. Palumbo was released by the Ducks on May 1.
