= Kyle Dowdy =

American baseball player (born 1993)

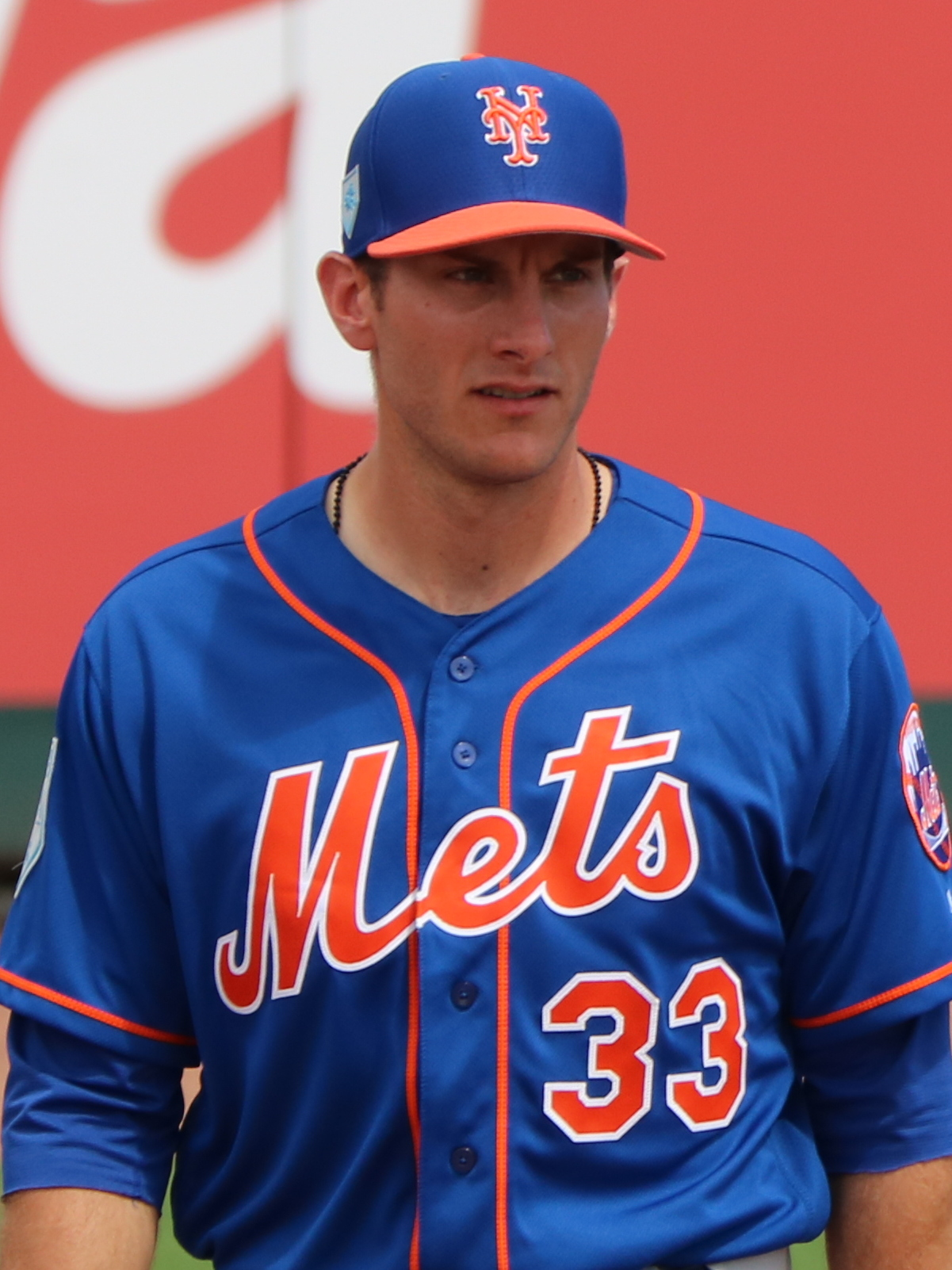
- Dowdy with the Mets in 2019
- Pitcher
- Born: February 3, 1993 (age 33); Escondido, California, U.S.
- Batted: Right Threw: Right

MLB debut
- March 28, 2019, for the Texas Rangers

Last MLB appearance
- September 17, 2022, for the Cincinnati Reds

MLB statistics
- Win–loss record: 2–1
- Earned run average: 5.65
- Strikeouts: 20
- Stats at Baseball Reference

Teams
- Texas Rangers (2019); Cincinnati Reds (2022)

Kyle Alexander Dowdy (born February 3, 1993) is an American former professional baseball pitcher. He played in Major League Baseball (MLB) for the Texas Rangers and Cincinnati Reds.

== Amateur career ==
Dowdy graduated from Francis Parker School in San Diego, California, in 2011. Undrafted out of high school in the 2011 MLB draft, he enrolled at the University of Hawaii where he played college baseball for the Hawaii Rainbow Warriors. In 2012, as a freshman, he appeared in 13 games, going 2–3 with a 3.06 earned run average (ERA).

Following his freshman year, Dowdy transferred to Orange Coast College. As a sophomore in 2013, he had a 6–3 record with a 2.38 ERA, striking out 62 batters in 75.2 innings. He transferred to the University of Houston following his sophomore season. He was forced to sit out the 2014 campaign after undergoing Tommy John surgery. In 2015, as a redshirt junior, Dowdy was 9–2 with a 2.45 ERA in 19 games, including 12 starts. After the 2015 season, he was drafted by the Detroit Tigers in the 12th round of the 2015 MLB draft.

== Professional career ==
=== Detroit Tigers ===
Dowdy made his professional debut in 2016 with the Single–A West Michigan Whitecaps, with whom he was named a Midwest League All-Star. He finished the year 10–3 with a 2.84 ERA in 23 games (16 starts). He spent 2017 with the High–A Lakeland Flying Tigers, where he was named to the Florida State League All-Star team, pitching to an 8–12 record with a 3.83 ERA in 25 games (22 starts). He began 2018 with the Double–A Erie SeaWolves and was later promoted to the Triple–A Toledo Mud Hens.

=== Cleveland Indians ===
On July 31, 2018, Dowdy and Leonys Martín were traded to the Cleveland Indians in exchange for Willi Castro. He was assigned to the Double-A Akron RubberDucks, where he finished the year. In 30 games (20 starts) between Erie, Toledo, and Akron, he was 9–12 with a 5.15 ERA and a 1.48 WHIP.

The New York Mets selected Dowdy in the 2018 Rule 5 draft on December 13, 2018.

=== Texas Rangers ===
The Texas Rangers claimed Dowdy off of waivers from the Mets on March 26, 2019, and shortly thereafter, added him to their 25-man roster. He made his major league debut on March 28, 2019, versus the Chicago Cubs, allowing three runs over two innings of relief. On July 25, Dowdy was designated for assignment after going 2–1 with a 7.25 ERA and 17 strikeouts over 22 1/3 innings for Texas.

=== Cleveland Indians (second stint) ===
On July 28, 2019, Dowdy was returned to the Cleveland Indians. Dowdy went to Akron following his return and went 1–1 with a 2.48 ERA over 29 innings for them, before finishing the season by appearing in the International League playoffs for the Columbus Clippers. Dowdy did not play in a game for the Indians organization in 2020 due to the cancellation of the minor league season because of the COVID-19 pandemic. In July 2020, Eibner signed on to play for the Eastern Reyes del Tigre of the Constellation Energy League (a makeshift 4-team independent league created as a result of the COVID-19 pandemic) for the 2020 season. Dowdy recorded a 10.13 ERA in 2 games. He returned to the Indians organization in 2021, posting a 4.80 ERA in 39 appearances for Triple-A Columbus. Dowdy elected free agency on November 7, 2021.

=== Cincinnati Reds ===
On December 9, 2021, Dowdy signed a minor league contract with the Cincinnati Reds. In 48 appearances out of the bullpen for the Triple–A Louisville Bats, he compiled a 3.96 ERA with 56 strikeouts across 52 1/3 innings pitched. On September 13, 2022, the Reds selected Dowdy's contract, adding him to their active roster. He made two scoreless appearances for Cincinnati, recording three strikeouts in 6 1/3 innings. Dowdy was designated for assignment on November 15, after multiple prospects were added to the roster. Three days later, he was non–tendered and became a free agent.

=== Baltimore Orioles ===
On December 19, 2022, Dowdy signed a minor league contract with the Baltimore Orioles. In 39 appearances for the Triple–A Norfolk Tides, he posted an 8–4 record and 4.38 ERA with 74 strikeouts across 63 2/3 innings of work. Dowdy elected free agency following the season on November 6.

== See also ==
- Rule 5 draft results
