= Kyle Bird =

American baseball player (born 1993)

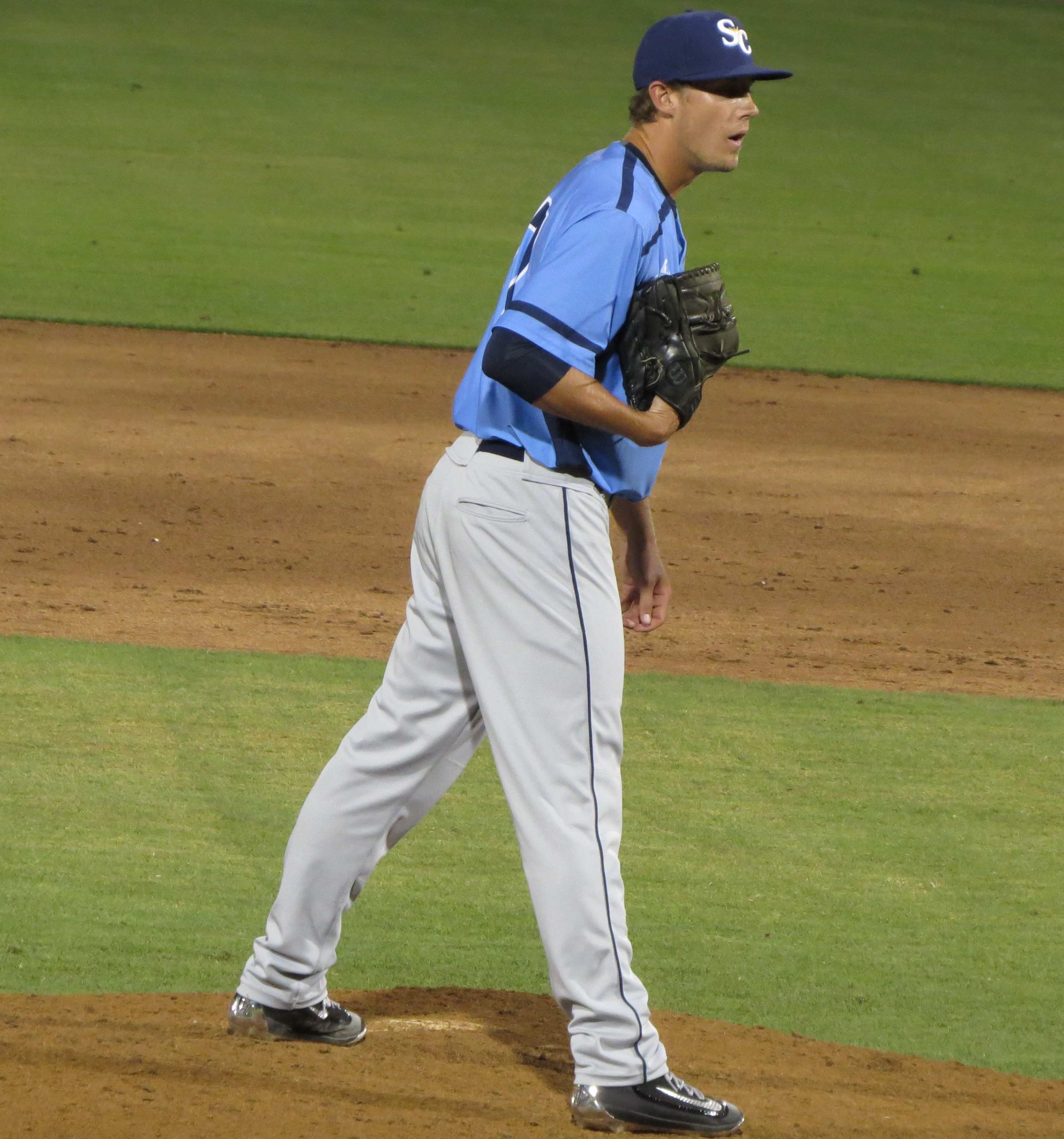
- Bird with the Charlotte Stone Crabs in 2016
- Relief pitcher
- Born: April 12, 1993 (age 32); Orange Park, Florida, U.S.
- Batted: Left Threw: Left

Professional debut
- MLB: March 28, 2019, for the Texas Rangers
- NPB: June 14, 2021, for the Hiroshima Toyo Carp

Last appearance
- MLB: July 30, 2019, for the Texas Rangers
- NPB: September 30, 2021, for the Hiroshima Toyo Carp

MLB statistics
- Win–loss record: 0–0
- Earned run average: 7.82
- Strikeouts: 10

NPB statistics
- Win–loss record: 0–1
- Earned run average: 4.11
- Strikeouts: 30
- Stats at Baseball Reference

Teams
- Texas Rangers (2019); Hiroshima Toyo Carp (2021)

Ronald Kyle Bird (born April 12, 1993) is an American former professional baseball relief pitcher. He played in Major League Baseball (MLB) for the Texas Rangers, and in Nippon Professional Baseball (NPB) for the Hiroshima Toyo Carp.

== Amateur career ==
Bird attended Clay High School in Green Cove Springs, Florida. Undrafted out of high school in 2011, Bird attended Florida State University for two years (2012 and 2013), before transferring to Division II Flagler College in St. Augustine, Florida, for his junior season in 2014. He was drafted by the Tampa Bay Rays in the 35th round, 1,057th overall, of the 2014 MLB draft.

== Professional career ==
=== Tampa Bay Rays ===
After signing with Tampa Bay, Bird was assigned to the rookie–level Princeton Rays to make his professional debut in 2014. In 19 innings pitched, he posted a 1–0 record with a 4.19 earned run average (ERA). He split the 2015 season between the Single–A Bowling Green Hot Rods and the Triple–A Durham Bulls. Through 33 games (1 with Durham), he accumulated 4–0 record with a 2.54 ERA and 71 strikeouts in 70 1/3 innings. He played the 2016 season with both the High–A Charlotte Stone Crabs and the Double–A Montgomery Biscuits. He appeared in 68 innings across 43 games, earning a 3–2 record with a 2.28 ERA and 60 strikeouts. He split the 2017 season between Montgomery and Durham. In 54 games, he posted a 4–2 record with a 2.89 ERA and 70 strikeouts in 74 2/3 innings. He again played the 2018 season at both Double–A and Triple–A. He appeared in 43 games, making 6 starts, and accumulated a 3–3 record with a 2.39 ERA and 88 strikeouts across 74 innings. After the 2018 regular season, Bird pitched for the Yaquis de Obregón of the Mexican Pacific League in winter ball. In 18 games with them, he went 1–0 with a 2.00 ERA and 19 strikeouts in 18 innings.

The Rays added Bird to their 40-man roster after the 2018 season.

=== Texas Rangers ===
On December 21, 2018, Bird was traded to the Texas Rangers as part of a three team deal in which the Rangers also acquired Brock Burke, Yoel Espinal, Eli White, and $750,000 of international signing bonus pool space; the Rays acquired Emilio Pagan, Rollie Lacy, and a competitive balance pick in the 2019 MLB draft (Seth Johnson); and the Oakland Athletics acquired Jurickson Profar.

Bird made the Rangers' 2019 Opening Day roster. On March 28, 2019, and made his major league debut that afternoon against the Chicago Cubs, walking Anthony Rizzo, the only batter he faced. He split the season between the Rangers and the Nashville Sounds. With Texas he logged a 7.82 ERA 12 2/3 innings, and with Nashville he went 5–1 with a 2.86 ERA in 34 2/3 innings.

On January 15, 2020, Bird was designated for assignment by the Rangers and outrighted to Triple–A a few days later. Bird did not play in a game in 2020 due to the cancellation of the minor league season because of the COVID-19 pandemic. He became a free agent on November 2.

=== Hiroshima Toyo Carp ===
On November 26, 2020, it was announced that Bird had signed with the Hiroshima Toyo Carp of Nippon Professional Baseball. He made his NPB debut on June 14. In 33 appearances for Hiroshima, Bird pitched to a 4.57 ERA with 21 strikeouts in 21 2/3 innings pitched. He became a free agent after the season.

=== Seattle Mariners ===
On March 8, 2022, Bird signed a minor league contract with the Seattle Mariners. He made 44 appearances out of the bullpen for the Triple–A Tacoma Rainiers, compiling a 6–1 record and 6.66 ERA with 50 strikeouts across 48 2/3 innings pitched. Bird elected free agency following the season on November 10.
