= Shawn Kelley =

American baseball player (born 1984)

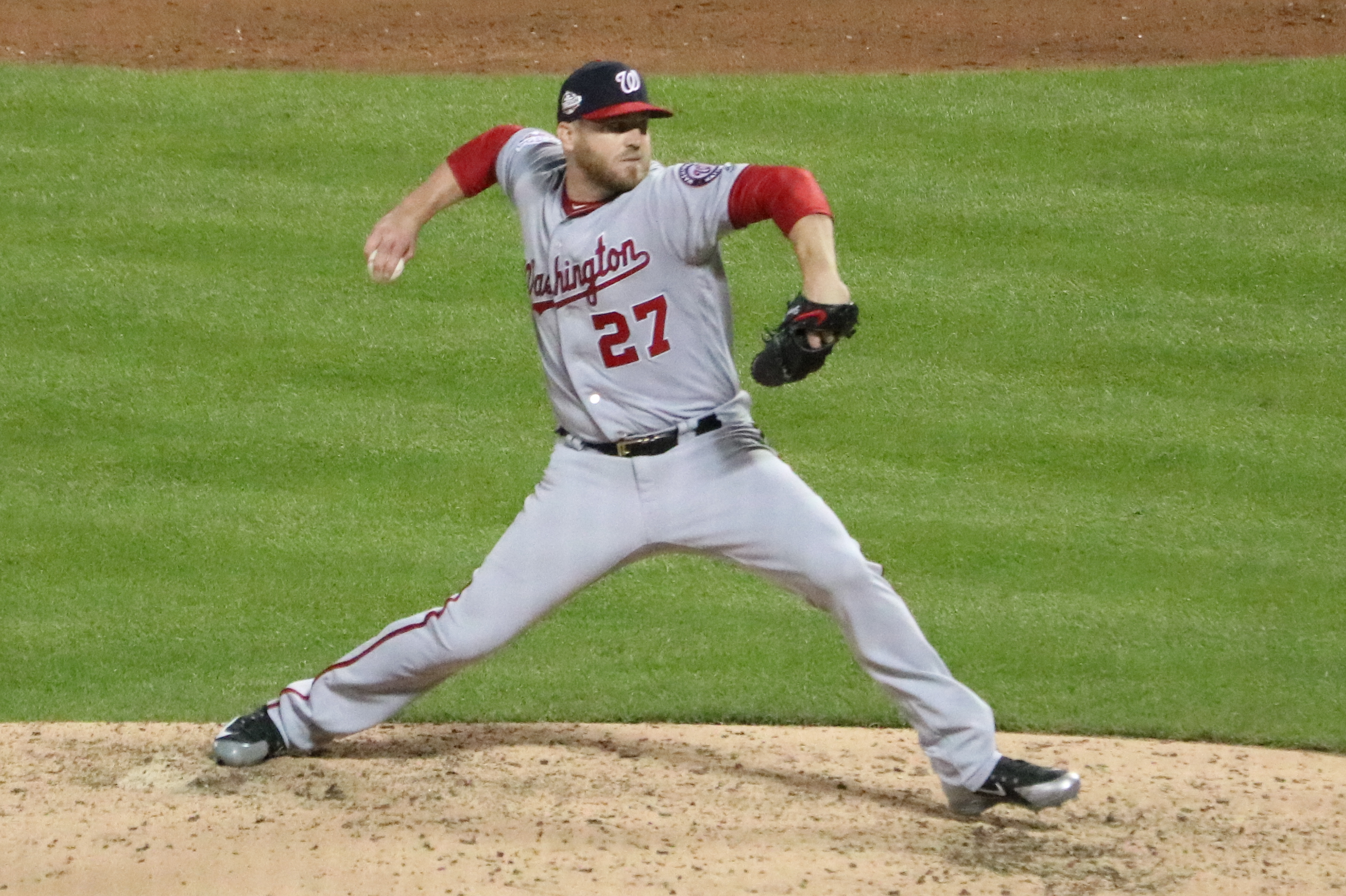
- Kelley with the Nationals in 2018
- Pitcher
- Born: April 26, 1984 (age 42); Louisville, Kentucky, U.S.
- Batted: Right Threw: Right

MLB debut
- April 10, 2009, for the Seattle Mariners

Last MLB appearance
- September 27, 2019, for the Texas Rangers

MLB statistics
- Win–loss record: 32–25
- Earned run average: 3.80
- Strikeouts: 521
- Stats at Baseball Reference

Teams
- Seattle Mariners (2009–2012); New York Yankees (2013–2014); San Diego Padres (2015); Washington Nationals (2016–2018); Oakland Athletics (2018); Texas Rangers (2019)

Shawn Andrew Kelley (born April 26, 1984) is an American former professional baseball pitcher. He played in Major League Baseball (MLB) for the Seattle Mariners from 2009 to 2012, New York Yankees from 2013 to 2014, San Diego Padres in 2015, Washington Nationals from 2016 to 2018, the Oakland Athletics in 2018 and the Texas Rangers in 2019.

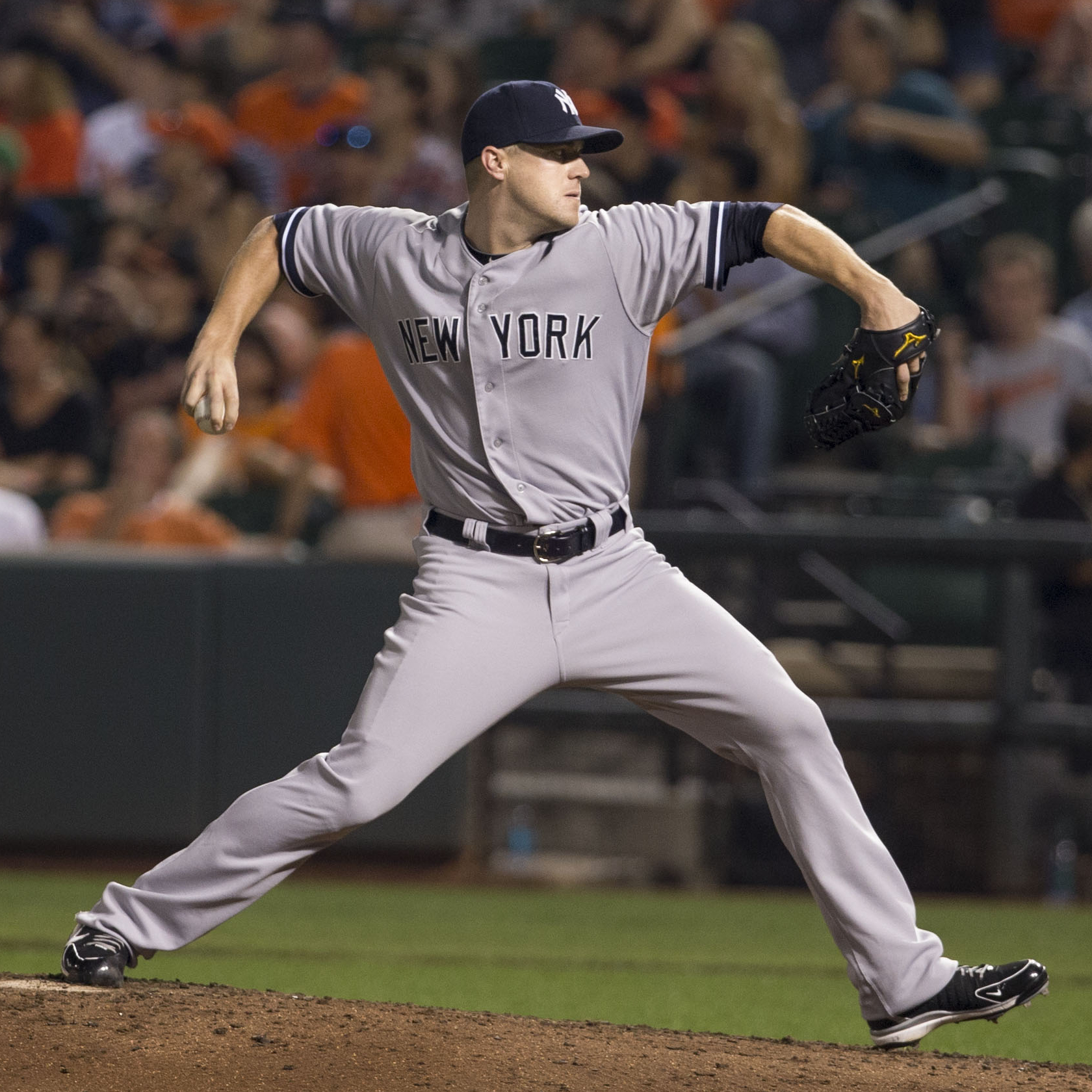
Kelley with the Yankees in 2013

Kelley attended Ballard High School, and later Austin Peay State University. Kelley was drafted by the Mariners in the 2007 Major League Baseball draft. He made his professional debut in 2007, and later made his major league debut in 2009. Kelley bats and throws right-handed.

== Amateur career ==
=== High school ===
Kelley attended Ballard High School in Louisville, Kentucky. As a pitcher for the school's baseball team, Kelley went 9–1 with a 1.12 earned run average (ERA), and 95 strikeouts in 74 innings pitched. He also batted .564 with seven home runs, and 21 stolen bases.

=== College ===
Kelley hoped to play college baseball for the University of Louisville, but they did not offer him a scholarship. Kelley accepted the only scholarship offer he received, from Austin Peay State University. In his first season, 2003, he was involved in no decisions with a 2.57 ERA in four games, one start. Kelley sustained an elbow injury in his first season and had Tommy John surgery, which ended his redshirt freshman season. During his freshman season in 2004, Kelley went 3–3 with a 3.45 ERA, and 51 strikeouts in 16 games, 10 starts. That season, he finished with the third lowest ERA in the Ohio Valley Conference. In his sophomore season in 2005, Kelley went 7–4 with a 3.59 ERA, one save, and 70 strikeouts in 17 games, 16 starts. That season, he was selected to the second-team All-Ohio Valley Conference.

In his junior season, Kelley went 5–6 with a 3.30 ERA, and 89 strikeouts in 18 games, 14 starts. His final season, 2007, Kelley went 11–3 with a 2.40 ERA, and 82 strikeouts in 17 games, 16 starts. On April 9, 2007, he was named the Ohio Valley Conference's Pitcher of the Week. He won his second Pitcher of the Week award on April 23. At the end of the 2007 season, Kelley was named to the second-team American Baseball Coaches All-South Region. On the academic side, Kelley received a bachelor's degree in political science.

== Professional career ==
=== Seattle Mariners ===
==== 2007–2008 seasons ====
Kelley was drafted by the Seattle Mariners in the 13^{th} round of the 2007 Major League Baseball Draft. He began his professional career that season with the Class-A Short-Season Everett AquaSox. With the AquaSox, he went 1–0 with a 3.00 ERA, and four strikeouts in three games, all in relief. After his stint in Everett, Kelley was promoted to the Class-A Wisconsin Timber Rattlers. In his debut with the Timber Rattlers, Kelley attained the win after pitching two relief innings. In nine games with Wisconsin, Kelley went 1–1 with a 2.25 ERA, and 14 strikeouts. In 2008, Kelley split the season between the Class-A Wisconsin Timber Rattlers, the Class-A Advanced High Desert Mavericks, and the Double-A West Tenn Diamond Jaxx. With the Timber Rattlers, he was involved in no decisions, and record a 3.52 ERA with three saves, and 12 strikeouts in eight games. He was then promoted to the Mavericks where in 12 relief appearances he was involved in no decisions, gave-up no earned runs, saved three games, and struck-out 12. Finally, with the Diamond Jaxx, Kelley went 3–1 with a 2.11 ERA, nine saves, and 44 strikeouts in 29 games, all in relief. Kelley was tied for first among Diamond Jaxx pitchers in games finished (24), and was second in saves. At the end of the 2008 regular season, Kelley played in the Venezuelan Winter League.

==== 2009 season ====
At the start of the 2009 season, Kelley was invited to Mariners' spring training as a non-roster invitee. During spring training, Mariners' manager Don Wakamatsu was reportedly impressed by Kelley's performance and was quoted as saying, "[Kelley's] stuff is outstanding. Very impressive." Kelley made the Mariners' 25-man roster after spring training. Kelley made his major league debut on April 10 against the Oakland Athletics and struck out two in one inning pitched. On May 1, Kelley picked up his first major league win in 1 2/3 innings pitched against the Oakland Athletics. On May 6, Kelley strained his left oblique and was placed on the 15-day disabled list. As a result, the Mariners called up pitcher Garrett Olson from the Triple-A Tacoma Rainiers to replace Kelley on the 25-man roster. Kelley pitched three rehab games in the minor leagues. His first were with the rookie-level Arizona League Mariners, where he pitched two games, both starts, and gave up no earned runs. The last was with the Triple-A Tacoma Rainiers, where he gave up no earned runs in one relief appearance. On June 3, the Mariners' activated Kelley from the disabled list, and as a result optioned first baseman Mike Carp to Triple-A Tacoma. On the season, Kelley went 5–4 with a 4.50 ERA, and 41 strikeouts in 41 games, all in relief for Seattle.

==== 2010 season ====
On February 24, 2010, during spring training workouts, Kelley was injured after he was accidentally kicked in the chin by teammate Mark Lowe. The accident required Kelley to receive six stitches. Kelley made the Mariners' 25-man roster out of spring training for the second time in his career in 2010. On April 30, after pitcher Cliff Lee was activated from the disabled list, the Mariners optioned Kelley to the Triple-A Tacoma Rainiers. However, on May 6, after Mark Lowe was placed on the disabled list, Kelley was recalled and placed on the Mariners' 25-man roster. He was designated for assignment on February 7, 2013.

=== New York Yankees ===
On February 13, 2013, Kelley was traded to the New York Yankees in exchange for Abraham Almonte. In the 2013 season, Kelley recorded 71 strikeouts in 53 innings pitched.

Kelley filled in for David Robertson as the Yankees' closer while Robertson was on the disabled list in April 2014.

On April 7, 2014, Kelley recorded his first career save. On May 5, 2014, Kelley was ejected for the first time in his MLB career by home plate umpire Laz Díaz for arguing balls and strikes. On May 13, 2014, Kelley was placed on the 15-day disabled list due to a strained lumbar spine in his back.

=== San Diego Padres ===
On December 29, 2014, he was traded to the San Diego Padres in exchange for minor league pitcher Johnny Barbato. He became a free agent following the 2015 season.

=== Washington Nationals ===
On December 11, 2015, Kelley signed a three-year, $15 million contract with the Washington Nationals. Ticketed as the Nationals' primary setup man, Kelley filled in as closer while Jonathan Papelbon was on the disabled list in June 2016. Kelley generally excelled in the role of setup man, but he surrendered the runs that ultimately ended the Nationals' year, with Los Angeles Dodgers third baseman Justin Turner hitting an RBI triple to deep center field in Game 5 of the 2016 National League Division Series. Kelley was removed from the game during the next at-bat with arm discomfort.

During the 2017 season, Kelley was among the relievers manager Dusty Baker tried as closer, with Opening Day closer Blake Treinen being demoted due to ineffectiveness early in the season. Kelley himself lost the role by late May, with Baker moving rookie Koda Glover into the position due to Kelley's lack of durability. Kelley experienced dramatic increases in his rates of walks and home runs allowed over the first half of the season, landing on the disabled list twice (with a lower back strain in May and a right trapezius strain in June) as he struggled to a 7.00 ERA and 4.5 home run rate per nine innings. Those tendencies continued after he returned from the disabled list; by the time he suffered a season-ending elbow injury on September 22, he had allowed 12 home runs in 26 innings at the major league level and finished the year with a 7.27 ERA.

While still struggling with his home run rate and injury issues, Kelley enjoyed a rebound performance over the first half of the 2018 season, pitching to a 3.34 ERA through the month of July. On July 31, 2018, Kelley was called to pitch the ninth inning with the Nationals holding a 25–1 lead over the New York Mets. After allowing a two-run home run to Austin Jackson, Kelley angrily threw his glove to the ground and glared into the Nationals' dugout. On August 1, Kelley was designated for assignment by the Nationals, who called his outburst "selfish" and "disrespectful to the organization". Kelley said he "acted like a baby" but denied his intent was to show up manager Dave Martinez.

=== Oakland Athletics ===
On August 5, 2018, Kelley was traded to the Oakland Athletics in exchange for an international signing bonus slot. He became a free agent following the season.

=== Texas Rangers ===
On January 29, 2019, Kelley signed a one-year contract with a club option, with the Texas Rangers. He became a free agent after the season.

On March 10, 2021, Kelley confirmed his retirement in a Twitter response to Tim Dillard, who had retired the same day.

== Personal life ==
Kelley was born on April 26, 1984, in Louisville, Kentucky, to Dennis and Rhonda Kelley. Before making it to the major leagues, Kelley worked at a golf course during the winter to make money. Kelley has a younger brother, Justin. Kelley has 4 children, two sons and one daughter. He is married to Kristina Kelley. On May 16, 2019, he underwent surgery to remove two lumps from his vocal cords, which tested as benign.
