= José Leclerc =

Dominican baseball player (born 1993)

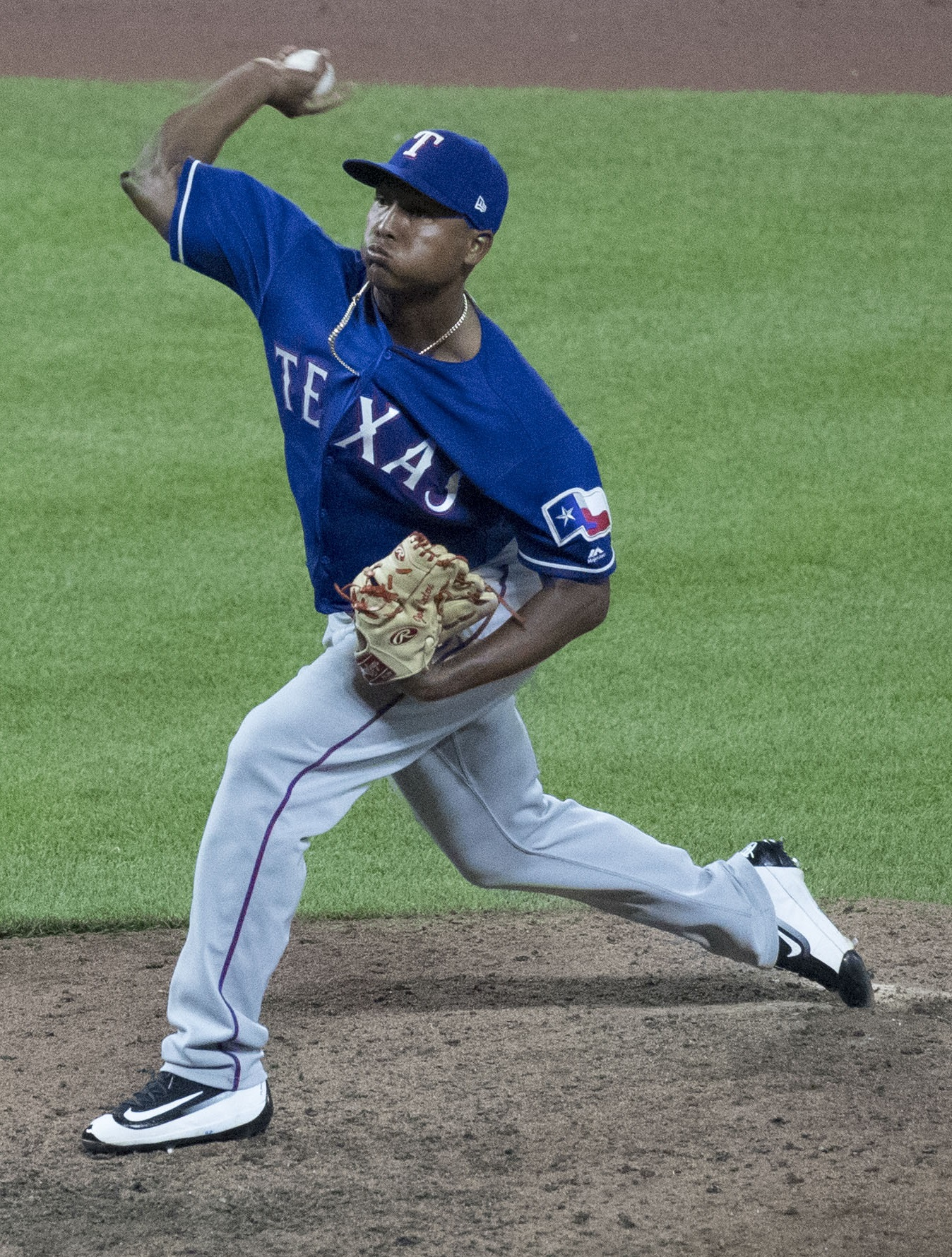
- Leclerc with the Texas Rangers in 2017

Free agent
- Pitcher
- Born: December 19, 1993 (age 32); Esperanza, Dominican Republic
- Bats: Right Throws: Right

MLB debut
- July 6, 2016, for the Texas Rangers

MLB statistics (through 2025 season)
- Win–loss record: 12–21
- Earned run average: 3.34
- Strikeouts: 481
- Saves: 41
- Stats at Baseball Reference

Teams
- Texas Rangers (2016–2020, 2022–2024); Athletics (2025)

Career highlights and awards
- World Series champion (2023)

José Ramón Leclerc (born December 19, 1993) is a Dominican professional baseball pitcher who is a free agent. He has previously played in Major League Baseball (MLB) for the Texas Rangers and Athletics. He made his MLB debut in 2016.

== Early life ==
José Ramón Leclerc was born on December 19, 1993, in Esperanza, Dominican Republic.

== Professional career ==
=== Texas Rangers ===
==== Minor leagues ====
Leclerc signed with the Texas Rangers as an international free agent on November 20, 2010. Leclerc made his professional debut in 2011 with the DSL Rangers, posting a 3–1 win–loss record with a 2.36 earned run average (ERA) and 27 strikeouts in 34 1/3 innings pitched. He returned to the DSL Rangers for the 2012 season, pitching to a 3–1 record, a 1.54 ERA, and 41 strikeouts in 46 2/3 innings. In 2013, Leclerc pitched for the Hickory Crawdads of the Single-A South Atlantic League. He had a 3–4 record with a 3.36 ERA and 77 strikeouts in 59 innings. He spent the 2014 season with the Myrtle Beach Pelicans of the High-A Carolina League and finished the season with a 4–1 record with a 3.30 ERA and 79 strikeouts in 57 1/3 innings. Leclerc was utilized as a starting pitcher for the Frisco RoughRiders of the Double-A Texas League in 2015. He struggled to a 6–8 record with 5.77 ERA and 98 strikeouts in 103 innings.

The Rangers added Leclerc to their 40-man roster after the 2015 season, in order to be protect from the Rule 5 draft. He began the 2016 season with Frisco, posting a 0–5 record with a 3.52 ERA and 28 strikeouts in 23 innings. He received a midseason promotion to the Round Rock Express of the Triple-A Pacific Coast League, where he posted a 2–2 record with a 2.72 ERA and 50 strikeouts in 43 innings.

==== Major leagues ====
The Rangers promoted Leclerc to the major leagues for first time on July 5, 2016. In all, Leclerc posted a 0–0 record with a 1.80 ERA, 15 strikeouts, and 13 walks in 15 innings (12 games) of major league action.

Leclerc made the Texas Rangers' 2017 Opening Day roster out of spring training. He earned his first career save April 12 vs. Los Angeles Angels, entering the game with one out and a runner on second in the 8th inning with a 6–3 lead before striking out Mike Trout and getting Albert Pujols to fly out. He appeared in ten games before going on the disabled list on May 9 with a sprained right index finger. Before going on the disabled list, Leclerc recorded 18 strikeouts in 11 2/3 innings pitched. Leclerc finished the 2017 season posting a 2–3 record with a 3.94 ERA and 60 strikeouts in 45 2/3 innings.

In 2018, Leclerc split the month of April between the Rangers bullpen and Round Rock, returning to the major league roster for good on April 30. In August, after the Rangers traded Keone Kela to the Pittsburgh Pirates, Leclerc became the Rangers' closer. Leclerc produced his best season to date in 2018, producing a 2–3 record, 1.56 ERA, 85 strikeouts, and 12 saves in 57 2/3 innings pitched. Leclerc was named the 2018 Rangers' Pitcher of the Year by the Dallas-Fort Worth chapter of the Baseball Writers' Association of America.

On March 6, 2019, the Rangers signed Leclerc to a four-year contract extension through the 2022 season, with club options for the 2023 and 2024 seasons. The deal was worth $14.75 million guaranteed over four years, with $12.25 million possible over the two option seasons. In 2019, Leclerc went 2–4 with a 4.33 ERA, 100 strikeouts, and 14 saves over 68 2/3 innings.

In 2020, Leclerc pitched in only 2 games due to the pandemic.

On March 29, 2021, it was announced that Leclerc would undergo Tommy John surgery and miss the 2021 season. On March 30, Leclerc was placed on the 60-day injured list.

After completing rehab, Leclerc returned to MLB action in June 2022. That season he went 0–3 with a 2.83 ERA, 54 strikeouts, and seven saves over 47 2/3 innings.

Leclerc appeared in 57 games for the Rangers in 2023, posting a 2.68 ERA with 67 strikeouts across 57 innings pitched.

In the 2023 postseason, Leclerc set an MLB record by becoming the first pitcher to close his team's first seven games of the postseason. He threw 7 1/3 innings, allowed just one run, and recorded three saves over that span.

On October 28, Leclerc made his World Series debut, pitching two innings and earning the win as the Rangers defeated the Arizona Diamondbacks in extra innings. He won his first World Series with the 2023 Rangers.

Leclerc made 64 appearances for the Rangers in 2024, posting a 4.32 ERA with 89 strikeouts across 66^{2}/_{3} innings pitched. He became a free agent after the season.

=== Athletics ===
On January 17, 2025, Leclerc signed a one-year, $10 million contract with the Athletics. In 10 appearances for the Athletics, he struggled to an 0–1 record and 6.00 ERA with eight strikeouts over nine innings of work. On April 23, Leclerc was shut down due to a lat muscle strain. He was transferred to the 60-day injured list on April 30. On July 25, it was announced that Leclerc would undergo season-ending shoulder surgery.

=== San Diego Padres ===
On March 27, 2026, Leclerc signed a minor league contract with the San Diego Padres. He made 22 appearances (including three starts) for the rookie–level Arizona Complex League Padres, High–A Fort Wayne TinCaps, Double–A San Antonio Missions, and Triple–A El Paso Chihuahuas, struggling to a 1–2 record and 7.77 ERA with 26 strikeouts across 24 1/3 innings pitched. Leclerc was released by the Padres organization on September 7.
