= 2019 Seattle Mariners season =

2019 Seattle Mariners
- League: American League
- Division: West
- Ballpark: T-Mobile Park
- City: Seattle, Washington
- Record: 68–94 (.420)
- Divisional place: 5th
- Owners: Baseball Club of Seattle, LP, represented by CEO John Stanton
- Managers: Scott Servais
- Television: Root Sports Northwest (Dave Sims, Aaron Goldsmith, Mike Blowers)
- Radio: ESPN-710; Seattle Mariners Radio Network (Rick Rizzs, Aaron Goldsmith, Dave Sims)

The 2019 Seattle Mariners season was the 43rd season in franchise history. The Mariners played their 20th full season and 21st overall at the newly renamed T-Mobile Park, their home ballpark. The Mariners extended the longest active playoff drought in the four major North American professional sports, failing to make their first postseason appearance since 2001. The Mariners started the season with a 13–2 record, their best start in franchise history. However, they went 55–92 thereafter, finishing last in the American League West for the first time since 2012 and missing the playoffs.

With the Washington Nationals advancing to, and eventually winning, the World Series, the Mariners became the only MLB franchise to have never played in the World Series. The Mariners also set a then-MLB record by using 69 different players during the regular season, which would stand for five years before being broken by the 2024 Miami Marlins, tied by the Baltimore Orioles in 2025, broken by the Atlanta Braves in the same year and matched by the 2026 San Francisco Giants.

Two future Mariners Hall of Famers played their last game in 2019. Ichiro Suzuki retired after the second game of the season, part of a two-game series held in Tokyo, Japan. Félix Hernández made his final start in September, earning a win.

== Offseason ==
General manager Jerry Dipoto embarked on a "step back" plan that made the team less competitive in 2019. Veterans, including Robinson Canó, Edwin Díaz, James Paxton, and Mike Zunino were traded, which led to 21 players making their MLB debut during the season.

- November 8, 2018: Traded Mike Zunino, Guillermo Heredia, and Michael Plassmeyer to the Tampa Bay Rays for Mallex Smith and Jake Fraley.
- November 9: Signed Dylan Moore as a free agent.
- November 19: Traded James Paxton to the New York Yankees for Justus Sheffield, Erik Swanson, and Dom Thompson-Williams.
- November 30: Traded Alex Colomé to the Chicago White Sox for Omar Narváez.
- December 3: Traded Robinson Canó, Edwin Díaz, and cash to the New York Mets for Jarred Kelenic, Jay Bruce, Anthony Swarzak, Justin Dunn, and Gerson Bautista. Also, the Mariners traded Jean Segura, Juan Nicasio, and James Pazos to the Philadelphia Phillies for J. P. Crawford and Carlos Santana.
- December 5: Tayler Scott signed as a free agent.
- December 13: Traded Santana and cash to the Cleveland Indians. Received Edwin Encarnación and a 2019 competitive balance pick from Cleveland and cash from Tampa Bay.
- December 21: Received Domingo Santana in a trade with the Milwaukee Brewers, trading Ben Gamel and Noah Zavolas.
- January 1, 2019: Yusei Kikuchi signed a four-year, $56 million contract.
- January 10: Tim Beckham and Corey Gearrin signed as free agents.
- January 21: Received Shed Long Jr. in a trade with the Yankees for Josh Stowers.
- January 27: Hunter Strickland signed a one-year, $1.3 million contract.

== Standings ==
=== American League West ===
AL West
| Team | W | L | Pct. | GB | Home | Road |
|---|---|---|---|---|---|---|
| Houston Astros | 107 | 55 | .660 | — | 60‍–‍21 | 47‍–‍34 |
| Oakland Athletics | 97 | 65 | .599 | 10 | 52‍–‍29 | 45‍–‍36 |
| Texas Rangers | 78 | 84 | .481 | 29 | 45‍–‍36 | 33‍–‍48 |
| Los Angeles Angels | 72 | 90 | .444 | 35 | 38‍–‍43 | 34‍–‍47 |
| Seattle Mariners | 68 | 94 | .420 | 39 | 35‍–‍46 | 33‍–‍48 |

=== Record against opponents ===
2019 American League record Source: MLB Standings Grid – 2019
| Team | BAL | BOS | CWS | CLE | DET | HOU | KC | LAA | MIN | NYY | OAK | SEA | TB | TEX | TOR | NL |
|---|---|---|---|---|---|---|---|---|---|---|---|---|---|---|---|---|
| Baltimore | — | 7–12 | 3–3 | 3–4 | 3–4 | 2–4 | 3–3 | 4–3 | 0–6 | 2–17 | 1–6 | 3–4 | 7–12 | 1–6 | 8–11 | 7–13 |
| Boston | 12–7 | — | 5–2 | 3–3 | 5–2 | 2–4 | 5–1 | 4–3 | 3–3 | 5–14 | 4–3 | 4–3 | 7–12 | 4–3 | 11–8 | 10–10 |
| Chicago | 3–3 | 2–5 | — | 11–8 | 12–6 | 4–3 | 9–10 | 2–5 | 6–13 | 4–3 | 1–5 | 2–4 | 2–4 | 4–3 | 4–3 | 6–14 |
| Cleveland | 4–3 | 3–3 | 8–11 | — | 18–1 | 3–4 | 12–7 | 6–0 | 10–9 | 4–3 | 1–5 | 5–1 | 1–6 | 4–3 | 6–1 | 8–12 |
| Detroit | 4–3 | 2–5 | 6–12 | 1–18 | — | 1–6 | 10–9 | 3–3 | 5–14 | 3–3 | 1–6 | 1–6 | 2–4 | 0–6 | 3–4 | 5–15 |
| Houston | 4–2 | 4–2 | 3–4 | 4–3 | 6–1 | — | 5–1 | 14–5 | 3–4 | 4–3 | 11–8 | 18–1 | 3–4 | 13–6 | 4–2 | 11–9 |
| Kansas City | 3–3 | 1–5 | 10–9 | 7–12 | 9–10 | 1–5 | — | 2–4 | 5–14 | 2–5 | 2–5 | 2–5 | 3–4 | 2–5 | 1–6 | 9–11 |
| Los Angeles | 3–4 | 3–4 | 5–2 | 0–6 | 3–3 | 5–14 | 4–2 | — | 1–5 | 2–5 | 6–13 | 10–9 | 3–4 | 9–10 | 6–1 | 12–8 |
| Minnesota | 6–0 | 3–3 | 13–6 | 9–10 | 14–5 | 4–3 | 14–5 | 5–1 | — | 2–4 | 3–4 | 5–2 | 5–2 | 6–1 | 4–3 | 8–12 |
| New York | 17–2 | 14–5 | 3–4 | 3–4 | 3–3 | 3–4 | 5–2 | 5–2 | 4–2 | — | 2–4 | 6–1 | 12–7 | 3–3 | 11–8 | 12–8 |
| Oakland | 6–1 | 3–4 | 5–1 | 5–1 | 6–1 | 8–11 | 5–2 | 13–6 | 4–3 | 4–2 | — | 10–9 | 4–3 | 13–6 | 0–6 | 11–9 |
| Seattle | 4–3 | 3–4 | 4–2 | 1–5 | 6–1 | 1–18 | 5–2 | 9–10 | 2–5 | 1–6 | 9–10 | — | 2–4 | 8–11 | 4–2 | 9–11 |
| Tampa Bay | 12–7 | 12–7 | 4–2 | 6–1 | 4–2 | 4–3 | 4–3 | 4–3 | 2–5 | 7–12 | 3–4 | 4–2 | — | 3–3 | 13–6 | 14–6 |
| Texas | 6–1 | 3–4 | 3–4 | 3–4 | 6–0 | 6–13 | 5–2 | 10–9 | 1–6 | 3–3 | 6–13 | 11–8 | 3–3 | — | 3–3 | 9–11 |
| Toronto | 11–8 | 8–11 | 3–4 | 1–6 | 4–3 | 2–4 | 6–1 | 1–6 | 3–4 | 8–11 | 6–0 | 2–4 | 6–13 | 3–3 | — | 3–17 |

== Regular season ==
=== Game log ===
2019 game log: 68–94 (Home: 35–46; Away: 33–48)
March: 5–1 (Home: 3–1; Away: 2–0)

| # | Date | Opponent | Score | Win | Loss | Save | Attendance | Record | Streak |
|---|---|---|---|---|---|---|---|---|---|
| 1 | March 20 @Tokyo Dome | @ Athletics | 9–7 | **Gonzales** (1–0) | Fiers (0–1) | **Strickland** (1) | 45,787 | 1–0 | W1 |
| 2 | March 21 @Tokyo Dome | @ Athletics | 5–4 (12) | **Rosscup** (1–0) | Buchter (0–1) | **Strickland** (2) | 46,451 | 2–0 | W2 |
| 3 | March 28 | Red Sox | 12–4 | **Gonzales** (2–0) | Sale (0–1) | — | 45,601 | 3–0 | W3 |
| 4 | March 29 | Red Sox | 6–7 | Johnson (1–0) | **Strickland** (0–1) | Barnes (1) | 29,002 | 3–1 | L1 |
| 5 | March 30 | Red Sox | 6–5 | **Leake** (1–0) | Rodríguez (0–1) | **Rumbelow** (1) | 34,928 | 4–1 | W1 |
| 6 | March 31 | Red Sox | 10–8 | **LeBlanc** (1–0) | Porcello (0–1) | **Bradford** (1) | 33,391 | 5–1 | W2 |

April: 13–13 (Home: 4–9; Away: 9–4)

| # | Date | Opponent | Score | Win | Loss | Save | Attendance | Record | Streak |
|---|---|---|---|---|---|---|---|---|---|
| 7 | April 1 | Angels | 6–3 | **Hernández** (1–0) | Stratton (0–1) | **Elías** (1) | 14,463 | 6–1 | W3 |
| 8 | April 2 | Angels | 2–1 | **Gonzales** (3–0) | García (0–1) | **Swarzak** (1) | 13,567 | 7–1 | W4 |
| – | April 4 | @ White Sox | Postponed (inclement weather); Rescheduled for April 5th. | | | | | | |
| 9 | April 5 | @ White Sox | 8–10 | Burr (1–0) | **Gearrin** (0–1) | Colomé (2) | 32,723 | 7–2 | L1 |
| 10 | April 6 | @ White Sox | 9–2 | **Leake** (2–0) | Giolito (1–1) | — | 31,286 | 8–2 | W1 |
| 11 | April 7 | @ White Sox | 12–5 | **LeBlanc** (2–0) | Nova (0–1) | — | 12,509 | 9–2 | W2 |
| 12 | April 8 | @ Royals | 13–5 | **Elías** (1–0) | Bailey (0–1) | — | 10,259 | 10–2 | W3 |
| 13 | April 9 | @ Royals | 6–3 | **Gonzales** (4–0) | Junis (1–1) | **Swarzak** (2) | 10,366 | 11–2 | W4 |
| 14 | April 10 | @ Royals | 6–5 | **Swarzak** (1–0) | Boxberger (0–2) | **Elías** (2) | 12,775 | 12–2 | W5 |
| 15 | April 11 | @ Royals | 7–6 (10) | **Brennan** (1–0) | Sparkman (0–1) | **Sadzeck** (1) | 10,231 | 13–2 | W6 |
| 16 | April 12 | Astros | 6–10 | Peacock (2–0) | **Armstrong** (0–1) | Osuna (5) | 30,969 | 13–3 | L1 |
| 17 | April 13 | Astros | 1–3 | Verlander (2–0) | **Hernández** (1–1) | Osuna (6) | 30,533 | 13–4 | L2 |
| 18 | April 14 | Astros | 2–3 | Cole (1–2) | **Brennan** (0–1) | Osuna (7) | 29,237 | 13–5 | L3 |
| 19 | April 15 | Indians | 4–6 | Bauer (2–1) | **Kikuchi** (0–1) | Hand (5) | 11,214 | 13–6 | L4 |
| 20 | April 16 | Indians | 2–4 | Bieber (2–0) | **Leake** (2–1) | Hand (6) | 11,826 | 13–7 | L5 |
| 21 | April 17 | Indians | 0–1 | Carrasco (2–2) | **Swanson** (0–1) | Wittgren (1) | 13,325 | 13–8 | L6 |
| 22 | April 18 | @ Angels | 11–10 | **Swarzak** (2–0) | Allen (0–1) | **Elias** (3) | 33,592 | 14–8 | W1 |
| 23 | April 19 | @ Angels | 5–3 | **Rosscup** (2–0) | Allen (0–2) | **Elias** (4) | 41,021 | 15–8 | W2 |
| 24 | April 20 | @ Angels | 6–5 | **Kikuchi** (1–1) | Cahill (1–2) | **Swarzak** (3) | 41,147 | 16–8 | W3 |
| 25 | April 21 | @ Angels | 6–8 | Barria (2–1) | **Leake** (2–2) | García (1) | 34,155 | 16–9 | L1 |
| 26 | April 23 | @ Padres | 3–6 | Margevicius (2–2) | **Swanson** (0–2) | Yates (11) | 25,154 | 16–10 | L2 |
| 27 | April 24 | @ Padres | 0–1 | Paddack (1–1) | **Hernández** (1–2) | Yates (12) | 23,417 | 16–11 | L3 |
| 28 | April 25 | Rangers | 14–2 | **Gonzales** (5–0) | Hearn (0–1) | — | 12,644 | 17–11 | W1 |
| 29 | April 26 | Rangers | 5–4 (11) | **Elias** (2–0) | Dowdy (1–1) | — | 21,721 | 18–11 | W2 |
| 30 | April 27 | Rangers | 1–15 | Minor (3–2) | **Leake** (2–3) | — | 26,493 | 18–12 | L1 |
| 31 | April 28 | Rangers | 1–14 | Lynn (3–2) | **Swanson** (0–3) | — | 21,503 | 18–13 | L2 |
| 32 | April 30 | Cubs | 5–6 | Brach (3–0) | **Brennan** (1–1) | Cishek (1) | 27,545 | 18–14 | L3 |

May: 7–21 (Home: 5–7; Away: 2–14)

| # | Date | Opponent | Score | Win | Loss | Save | Attendance | Record | Streak |
|---|---|---|---|---|---|---|---|---|---|
| 33 | May 1 | Cubs | 0–11 | Lester (2–1) | **Gonzales** (5–1) | — | 29,471 | 18–15 | L4 |
| 34 | May 3 | @ Indians | 1–2 | Hand (1–1) | **Swarzak** (2–1) | — | 16,334 | 18–16 | L5 |
| 35 | May 4 | @ Indians | 4–5 | Olson (1–0) | **Sadzeck** (0–1) | Hand (10) | 18.420 | 18–17 | L6 |
| 36 | May 5 | @ Indians | 10–0 | **Swanson** (1–3) | Anderson (0–1) | — | 19,665 | 19–17 | W1 |
| 37 | May 6 | @ Yankees | 3–7 | Sabathia (2–1) | **Hernández** (1–3) | — | 37,423 | 19–18 | L1 |
| 38 | May 7 | @ Yankees | 4–5 | Harvey (1–0) | **Swarzak** (2–2) | — | 36,851 | 19–19 | L2 |
| 39 | May 8 | @ Yankees | 10–1 | **Kikuchi** (2–1) | Loáisiga (1–1) | — | 38,774 | 20–19 | W1 |
| 40 | May 9 | @ Yankees | 1–3 | Happ (2–3) | **Leake** (2–4) | Chapman (8) | 37,016 | 20–20 | L1 |
| 41 | May 10 | @ Red Sox | 1–14 | Rodríguez (4–2) | **Swanson** (1–4) | — | 33,731 | 20–21 | L2 |
| 42 | May 11 | @ Red Sox | 5–9 | Porcello (3–3) | **Hernández** (1–4) | — | 36,024 | 20–22 | L3 |
| 43 | May 12 | @ Red Sox | 2–11 | Velázquez (1–2) | **Gonzales** (5–2) | — | 33,069 | 20–23 | L4 |
| 44 | May 13 | Athletics | 6–5 (10) | **Brennan** (2–2) | Soria (1–3) | — | 12,250 | 21–23 | W1 |
| 45 | May 14 | Athletics | 4–3 | **Leake** (3–4) | Anderson (4–3) | **Elias** (5) | 11,365 | 22–23 | W2 |
| 46 | May 16 | Twins | 6–11 | Pineda (3–3) | **Swanson** (1–5) | — | 16,397 | 22–24 | L1 |
| 47 | May 17 | Twins | 1–7 | Pérez (6–1) | **Gonzales** (5–3) | — | 20,268 | 22–25 | L2 |
| 48 | May 18 | Twins | 4–18 | Duffey (1–0) | **LeBlanc** (2–1) | — | 34,433 | 22–26 | L3 |
| 49 | May 19 | Twins | 7–4 | **Kikuchi** (3–1) | Gibson (4–2) | — | 31,068 | 23–26 | W1 |
| 50 | May 20 | @ Rangers | 9–10 | Minor (5–3) | **Leake** (3–5) | — | 18,796 | 23–27 | L1 |
| 51 | May 21 | @ Rangers | 3–5 | Lynn (6–3) | **Milone** (0–1) | Kelley (3) | 19,157 | 23–28 | L2 |
| 52 | May 22 | @ Rangers | 1–2 | Sampson (2–3) | **Gonzales** (5–4) | Kelley (4) | 22,400 | 23–29 | L3 |
| 53 | May 24 | @ Athletics | 2–6 | Trivino (2–0) | **LeBlanc** (2–2) | — | 12,902 | 23–30 | L4 |
| 54 | May 25 | @ Athletics | 5–6 | Fiers (4–3) | **Kikuchi** (3–2) | Treinen (10) | 18,975 | 23–31 | L5 |
| 55 | May 26 | @ Athletics | 1–7 | Anderson (6–3) | **Leake** (3–6) | — | 14,664 | 23–32 | L6 |
| 56 | May 27 | Rangers | 6–2 | **Milone** (1–1) | Lynn (6–4) | — | 14,135 | 24–32 | W1 |
| 57 | May 28 | Rangers | 4–11 | Sampson (3–3) | **Gonzales** (5–5) | — | 12,452 | 24–33 | L1 |
| 58 | May 29 | Rangers | 7–8 | Chavez (1–1) | **Bass** (0–1) | Kelley (6) | 16,059 | 24–34 | L2 |
| 59 | May 30 | Angels | 3–9 | Peña (3–1) | **Kikuchi** (3–3) | — | 13,972 | 24–35 | L3 |
| 60 | May 31 | Angels | 4–3 | **Leake** (4–6) | Skaggs (4–5) | **Bass** (1) | 32,164 | 25–35 | W1 |

June: 12–16 (Home: 5–8; Away: 7–8)

| # | Date | Opponent | Score | Win | Loss | Save | Attendance | Record | Streak |
|---|---|---|---|---|---|---|---|---|---|
| 61 | June 1 | Angels | 3–6 | Bedrosian (2–3) | **Brennan** (2–3) | Robles (7) | 28,128 | 25–36 | L1 |
| 62 | June 2 | Angels | 3–13 | Suárez (1–0) | **Gonzales** (5–6) | — | 28,912 | 25–37 | L2 |
| 63 | June 3 | Astros | 2–4 | Valdez (3–2) | **Gearrin** (0–2) | Pressly (3) | 11,825 | 25–38 | L3 |
| 64 | June 4 | Astros | 5–11 | Guduan (1–0) | **Brennan** (2–4) | — | 12,208 | 25–39 | L4 |
| 65 | June 5 | Astros | 14–1 | **Leake** (5–6) | Peacock (5–3) | — | 13,652 | 26–39 | W1 |
| 66 | June 6 | Astros | 7–8 (14) | Devenski (1–0) | **Festa** (0–1) | — | 20,258 | 26–40 | L1 |
| 67 | June 7 | @ Angels | 6–2 | **Gonzales** (6–6) | Heaney (0–1) | — | 41,495 | 27–40 | W1 |
| 68 | June 8 | @ Angels | 3–12 | Peters (1–0) | **Kikuchi** (3–4) | — | 40,569 | 27–41 | L1 |
| 69 | June 9 | @ Angels | 9–3 | **LeBlanc** (3–2) | Suárez (1–1) | — | 41,614 | 28–41 | W1 |
| 70 | June 11 | @ Twins | 5–6 | Magill (2–0) | **Brennan** (2–5) | May (2) | 23,046 | 28–42 | L1 |
| 71 | June 12 | @ Twins | 9–6 (10) | **Bass** (1–1) | Duffey (1–1) | **Elías** (6) | 25,909 | 29–42 | W1 |
| 72 | June 13 | @ Twins | 5–10 | Harper (2–0) | **Brennan** (2–6) | — | 31,912 | 29–43 | L1 |
| 73 | June 14 | @ Athletics | 9–2 | **Gonzales** (7–6) | Bassitt (3–3) | — | 21,387 | 30–43 | W1 |
| 74 | June 15 | @ Athletics | 2–11 | Montas (9–2) | **Bautista** (0–1) | — | 14,846 | 30–44 | L1 |
| 75 | June 16 | @ Athletics | 6–3 | **Leake** (6–6) | Trivino (2–5) | **Elías** (7) | 30,242 | 31–44 | W1 |
| 76 | June 17 | Royals | 4–6 | Flynn (1–0) | **Bass** (1–2) | Kennedy (8) | 14,476 | 31–45 | L1 |
| 77 | June 18 | Royals | 0–9 | Bailey (6–6) | **Kikuchi** (3–5) | — | 12,697 | 31–46 | L2 |
| 78 | June 19 | Royals | 8–2 | **Gonzales** (8–6) | Keller (3–9) | — | 16,228 | 32–46 | W1 |
| 79 | June 20 | Orioles | 5–2 | **LeBlanc** (4–2) | Bundy (3–9) | **Elías** (8) | 15,217 | 33–46 | W2 |
| 80 | June 21 | Orioles | 10–9 | **Leake** (7–6) | Gilmartin (0–1) | **Elías** (9) | 23,281 | 34–46 | W3 |
| 81 | June 22 | Orioles | 4–8 | Cashner (7–3) | **Milone** (1–2) | — | 27,545 | 34–47 | L1 |
| 82 | June 23 | Orioles | 13–3 | **Kikuchi** (4–5) | Ynoa (0–5) | — | 23,920 | 35–47 | W1 |
| 83 | June 25 | @ Brewers | 8–3 | **Gonzales** (9–6) | Davies (7–2) | — | 28,468 | 36–47 | W2 |
| 84 | June 26 | @ Brewers | 4–2 | **LeBlanc** (5–2) | Houser (2–2) | **Elías** (10) | 30,074 | 37–47 | W3 |
| 85 | June 27 | @ Brewers | 2–4 | Anderson (4–2) | **Leake** (6–7) | Hader (19) | 36,587 | 37–48 | L1 |
| 86 | June 28 | @ Astros | 1–2 (10) | Harris (2–1) | **Festa** (0–2) | — | 32,828 | 37–49 | L2 |
| 87 | June 29 | @ Astros | 5–6 (10) | Devenski (2–0) | **Elías** (2–1) | — | 35,082 | 37–50 | L3 |
| 88 | June 30 | @ Astros | 1–6 | Cole (8–5) | **Gonzales** (9–7) | — | 32,485 | 37–51 | L4 |

July: 10–13 (Home: 9–7; Away: 1–6)

| # | Date | Opponent | Score | Win | Loss | Save | Attendance | Record | Streak |
|---|---|---|---|---|---|---|---|---|---|
| 89 | July 2 | Cardinals | 5–4 | **Adams** (1–0) | Gallegos (1–1) | **Elías** (11) | 20,173 | 38–51 | W1 |
| 90 | July 3 | Cardinals | 2–5 | Brebbia (2–3) | **Adams** (1–1) | — | 31,878 | 38–52 | L1 |
| 91 | July 4 | Cardinals | 4–5 | Ponce de Leon (1–0) | **Milone** (1–3) | Martinez (3) | 26,656 | 38–53 | L2 |
| 92 | July 5 | Athletics | 2–5 | Anderson (9–5) | **Kikuchi** (4–6) | Hendriks (4) | 19,712 | 38–54 | L3 |
| 93 | July 6 | Athletics | 6–3 | **Gonzales** (10–7) | Bassitt (5–4) | — | 24,298 | 39–54 | W1 |
| 94 | July 7 | Athletics | 4–7 | Mengden (4–1) | **Carasiti** (0–1) | Hendriks (5) | 25,816 | 39–55 | L1 |
| - | July 9 | **90th All-Star Game in Cleveland, OH** | | | | | | | |
| 95 | July 12 | @ Angels | 0–13 | Peña (7–2) | **Leake** (7–8) | — | 43,140 | 39–56 | L2 |
| 96 | July 13 | @ Angels | 2–9 | Harvey (3–4) | **LeBlanc** (5–3) | — | 41,549 | 39–57 | L3 |
| 97 | July 14 | @ Angels | 3–6 | Buttrey (5–4) | **Bass** (1–3) | Robles (13) | 38,560 | 39–58 | L4 |
| 98 | July 16 | @ Athletics | 2–9 | Mengden (5–1) | **Gonzales** (10–8) | — | 18,718 | 39–59 | L5 |
| 99 | July 17 | @ Athletics | 2–10 | Bailey (8–6) | **Milone** (1–4) | — | 19,161 | 39–60 | L6 |
| 100 | July 19 | Angels | 10–0 | **Leake** (8–8) | Barría (3–3) | — | 19,976 | 40–60 | W1 |
| 101 | July 20 | Angels | 2–6 | Buttrey (6–4) | **Elías** (2–2) | — | 30,927 | 40–61 | L1 |
| 102 | July 21 | Angels | 3–9 | Peters (2–0) | **Kikuchi** (4–7) | — | 24,767 | 40–62 | L2 |
| 103 | July 22 | Rangers | 7–3 | **Gonzales** (11–8) | Sampson (6–7) | **Elías** (12) | 16,091 | 41–62 | W1 |
| 104 | July 23 | Rangers | 2–7 | Payano (1–0) | **Milone** (1–5) | — | 15,543 | 41–63 | L1 |
| 105 | July 24 | Rangers | 5–3 | **Leake** (9–8) | Minor (8–6) | **Elías** (13) | 28,163 | 42–63 | W1 |
| 106 | July 25 | Tigers | 10–2 | **LeBlanc** (6–3) | VerHagen (1–1) | — | 18,544 | 43–63 | W2 |
| 107 | July 26 | Tigers | 3–2 | **Elías** (3–2) | Cisnero (0–1) | — | 26,702 | 44–63 | W3 |
| 108 | July 27 | Tigers | 8–1 | **Gonzales** (12–8) | Alexander (0–1) | — | 27,140 | 45–63 | W4 |
| 109 | July 28 | Tigers | 3–2 (10) | **Elías** (4–2) | Cisnero (0–2) | — | 20,024 | 46–63 | W5 |
| 110 | July 30 | @ Rangers | 8–5 | **Tuivailala** (1–0) | Martin (1–2) | **Elías** (14) | 20,599 | 47–63 | W6 |
| 111 | July 31 | @ Rangers | 7–9 | Minor (9–6) | **LeBlanc** (6–4) | Chavez (1) | 22,539 | 47–64 | L1 |

August: 10–16 (Home: 3–8; Away: 7–8)

| # | Date | Opponent | Score | Win | Loss | Save | Attendance | Record | Streak |
|---|---|---|---|---|---|---|---|---|---|
| 112 | August 2 | @ Astros | 2–10 | Miley (10–4) | **Kikuchi** (4–8) | — | 41,444 | 47–65 | L2 |
| 113 | August 3 | @ Astros | 0–9 | Sanchez (4–14) | **Gonzales** (12–9) | — | 37,059 | 47–66 | L3 |
| 114 | August 4 | @ Astros | 1–3 | Verlander (15–4) | **Milone** (1–6) | Osuna (25) | 39,667 | 47–67 | L4 |
| 115 | August 6 | Padres | 4–9 | Lamet (1–2) | **LeBlanc** (6–5) | — | 24,020 | 47–68 | L5 |
| 116 | August 7 | Padres | 3–2 | **Magill** (3–0) | Muñoz (0–1) | **Bass** (2) | 20,142 | 48–68 | W1 |
| 117 | August 9 | Rays | 3–5 | Drake (1–1) | **Bass** (1–4) | Pagán (10) | 26,774 | 48–69 | L1 |
| 118 | August 10 | Rays | 4–5 | Morton (13–4) | **Milone** (1–7) | Pagán (11) | 33,895 | 48–70 | L2 |
| 119 | August 11 | Rays | 0–1 | Yarbrough (11–3) | **LeBlanc** (6–6) | Pagán (12) | 24,219 | 48–71 | L3 |
| 120 | August 13 | @ Tigers | 11–6 | **Grotz** (1–0) | Boyd (6–9) | — | 16,195 | 49–71 | W1 |
| 121 | August 14 | @ Tigers | 3–2 | Jackson (3–5) | **Gonzales** (12–10) | Jiménez (2) | 17,132 | 49–72 | L1 |
| 122 | August 15 | @ Tigers | 7–2 | **Milone** (2–7) | Turnbull (3–11) | | 19,440 | 50–72 | W1 |
| 123 | August 16 | @ Blue Jays | 3–7 | Waguespack (4–1) | **LeBlanc** (6–7) | — | 20,844 | 50–73 | L1 |
| 124 | August 17 | @ Blue Jays | 4–3 | **Bass** (2–4) | Mayza (1–2) | **Magill** (1) | 22,073 | 51–73 | W1 |
| 125 | August 18 | @ Blue Jays | 7–0 | **Kikuchi** (5–8) | Font (3–3) | — | 23,604 | 52–73 | W2 |
| 126 | August 19 | @ Rays | 9–3 | **Gonzales** (13–10) | McKay (2–3) | — | 9,152 | 53–73 | W3 |
| 127 | August 20 | @ Rays | 7–4 | **Milone** (3–7) | Beeks (5–3) | **Magill** (2) | 7,455 | 54–73 | W4 |
| 128 | August 21 | @ Rays | 6–7 | Pagán (3–2) | **Magill** (3–1) | — | 7,827 | 54–74 | L1 |
| 129 | August 23 | Blue Jays | 7–4 | **Wisler** (3–2) | Gaviglio (4–2) | **Magill** (3) | 34,706 | 55–74 | W1 |
| 130 | August 24 | Blue Jays | 5–7 | Stewart (3–0) | **McClain** (0–1) | Law (4) | 34,590 | 55–75 | L1 |
| 131 | August 25 | Blue Jays | 3–1 | **Gonzales** (14–10) | Buchholz (0–3) | **Magill** (4) | 29,698 | 56–75 | W1 |
| 132 | August 26 | Yankees | 4–5 | Happ (11–8) | **Milone** (3–8) | Chapman (36) | 23,030 | 56–76 | L1 |
| 133 | August 27 | Yankees | 0–7 | Tanaka (10–7) | **Kikuchi** (5–9) | — | 23,129 | 56–77 | L2 |
| 134 | August 28 | Yankees | 3–7 | Paxton (11–6) | **Sheffield** (0–1) | — | 32,013 | 56–78 | L3 |
| 135 | August 29 | @ Rangers | 5–3 | **Magill** (4–1) | Leclerc (2–4) | — | 16,591 | 57–78 | W1 |
| 136 | August 30 | @ Rangers | 3–6 | Allard (3–0) | **Gonzales** (14–11) | Clase (1) | 23,563 | 57–79 | L1 |
| 137 | August 31 | @ Rangers | 2–3 | Clase (2–2) | **Magill** (4–2) | — | 33,668 | 57–80 | L2 |

September: 11–14 (Home: 6–6; Away: 5–8)

| # | Date | Opponent | Score | Win | Loss | Save | Attendance | Record | Streak |
|---|---|---|---|---|---|---|---|---|---|
| 138 | September 1 | @ Rangers | 11–3 | **Kikuchi** (6–9) | Martin (1–3) | — | 22,116 | 58–80 | W1 |
| 139 | September 2 | @ Cubs | 1–5 | Phelps (2–0) | **Wisler** (3–3) | — | 39,133 | 58–81 | L1 |
| 140 | September 3 | @ Cubs | 1–6 | Lester (12–9) | **Hernández** (1–5) | — | 33,958 | 58–82 | L2 |
| 141 | September 5 | @ Astros | 9–11 (13) | James (5–0) | **Wisler** (3–4) | — | 27,822 | 58–83 | L3 |
| 142 | September 6 | @ Astros | 4–7 | Smith (1–0) | **Milone** (3–9) | Osuna (32) | 33,149 | 58–84 | L4 |
| 143 | September 7 | @ Astros | 1–2 | Verlander (18–5) | **Adams** (1–2) | Harris (2) | 41,938 | 58–85 | L5 |
| 144 | September 8 | @ Astros | 1–21 | Cole (16–5) | **Hernández** (1–6) | — | 35,569 | 58–86 | L6 |
| 145 | September 10 | Reds | 4–3 | **Altavilla** (1–0) | Garrett (4–3) | **Bass** (3) | 12,230 | 59–86 | W1 |
| 146 | September 11 | Reds | 5–3 | **Gonzales** (15–11) | Gray (10–7) | **Bass** (4) | 10,152 | 60–86 | W2 |
| 147 | September 12 | Reds | 5–11 | Romano (1–0) | **Altavilla** (1–1) | — | 15,564 | 60–87 | L1 |
| 148 | September 13 | White Sox | 7–9 | Osich (3–0) | **Kikuchi** (6–10) | Colomé (27) | 17,255 | 60–88 | L2 |
| 149 | September 14 | White Sox | 2–1 (10) | **Magill** (5–2) | Colomé (4–4) | — | 26,063 | 61–88 | W1 |
| 150 | September 15 | White Sox | 11–10 | **Adams** (2–2) | Ruiz (1–3) | — | 17,091 | 62–88 | W2 |
| 151 | September 17 | @ Pirates | 6–0 | **Gonzales** (16–11) | Keller (1–5) | — | 10,933 | 63–88 | W3 |
| 152 | September 18 | @ Pirates | 4–1 | **Milone** (5–9) | Agrazal (4–5) | **Magill** (5) | 9,875 | 64–88 | W4 |
| 153 | September 19 | @ Pirates | 6–5 (11) | **Brennan** (3–6) | Holmes (1–2) | **Swanson** (1) | 12,543 | 65–88 | W5 |
| 154 | September 20 | @ Orioles | 3–5 | Brooks (6–8) | **Hernández** (1–7) | — | 11,719 | 65–89 | L1 |
| 155 | September 21 | @ Orioles | 7–6 (13) | **Altavilla** (2–1) | Scott (1–1) | **Swanson** (2) | 22,566 | 66–89 | W1 |
| 156 | September 22 | @ Orioles | 1–2 | Means (11–11) | **Gonzales** (16–12) | Bleier (4) | 17,540 | 66–90 | L1 |
| 157 | September 24 | Astros | 0–3 | Cole (19–5) | **Milone** (4–10) | Osuna (37) | 11,259 | 66–91 | L2 |
| 158 | September 25 | Astros | 0–3 | Greinke (18–5) | **Kikuchi** (6–11) | Harris (3) | 10,916 | 66–92 | L3 |
| 159 | September 26 | Athletics | 1–3 | Manaea (4–0) | **Hernández** (1–8) | Hendriks (25) | 20,907 | 66–93 | L4 |
| 160 | September 27 | Athletics | 4–3 | **Warren** (1–0) | Hendriks (4–4) | — | 24,092 | 67–93 | W1 |
| 161 | September 28 | Athletics | 0–1 | Anderson (13–9) | **Gonzales** (16–13) | Luzardo (2) | 26,401 | 67–94 | L1 |
| 162 | September 29 | Athletics | 3–1 | **McClain** (1–1) | Roark (10–10) | **Bass** (5) | 16,851 | 68–94 | W1 |

Legend: = Win = Loss &; = Postponement
Bold = Mariners team member

=== Notable transactions ===
- March 21, 2019: Ichiro Suzuki retired.
- May 4: Received Austin Adams in a trade with the Washington Nationals for Nick Wells.
- May 20: Traded Anthony Swarzak and cash to the Atlanta Braves for Jesse Biddle and Arodys Vizcaíno.
- June 2: Traded Jay Bruce and cash to the Philadelphia Phillies for Jake Scheiner.
- June 3: Start of 2019 MLB draft. Notable signings include:
  - George Kirby, drafted in the first round with the 20th overall selection. Signed for a $3.42 million signing bonus.
  - Brandon Williamson and Isaiah Campbell, drafted in the second round
  - Levi Stoudt, drafted in the third round
  - Austin Shenton, drafted in the fifth round
- June 15: Traded Edwin Encarnación and cash to the New York Yankees for Juan Then.
- July 31: Traded Mike Leake to the Arizona Diamondbacks for José Caballero. Also, the Mariners traded Roenis Elías and Hunter Strickland to the Nationals for Elvis Alvarado, Aaron Fletcher, and Taylor Guilbeau.

== Roster ==
2019 Seattle Mariners
Roster
| Pitchers: 63 Austin Adams; 56 R. J. Alaniz; 53 Dan Altavilla; 37 Shawn Armstrong; 52 Anthony Bass; 46 Gerson Bautista; 36 Jesse Biddle; 60 Chasen Bradford; 65 Brandon Brennan; 56 Matt Carasiti; 35 Justin Dunn; 55 Roenis Elías; 67 Matt Festa; 58 Ryan Garton; 35 Cory Gearrin; 7 Marco Gonzales; 37 Zac Grotz; 45 Taylor Guilbeau; 34 Félix Hernández; 18 Yusei Kikuchi; 8 Mike Leake; 49 Wade LeBlanc; 61 Matt Magill; 37 Parker Markel; 36 Reggie McClain; 64 David McKay; 57 Tommy Milone; 59 Andrew Moore; 59 Zac Rosscup; 52 Nick Rumbelow; 54 Connor Sadzeck; 61 Tayler Scott; 33 Justus Sheffield; 43 Hunter Strickland; 50 Erik Swanson; 30 Anthony Swarzak; 26 Sam Tuivailala; 43 Art Warren; 44 Matt Wisler; 41 Mike Wright | Catchers: 36 David Freitas; 2 Tom Murphy; 22 Omar Narváez; Infielders: 1 Tim Beckham; 12 Ryan Court; 3 J. P. Crawford; 10 Edwin Encarnación; 9 Dee Gordon; 27 Ryon Healy; 39 Shed Long; 25 Dylan Moore; 23 Austin Nola; 15 Kyle Seager; 20 Dan Vogelbach; 31 Donnie Walton | Outfielders: 5 Braden Bishop; 4 Keon Broxton; 32 Jay Bruce; 8 Jake Fraley; 17 Mitch Haniger; 30 Kyle Lewis; 10 Tim Lopes; 45 Kristopher Negrón; 16 Domingo Santana; 0 Mallex Smith; 51 Ichiro Suzuki; 12 Mac Williamson | Manager: 29 Scott Servais; Coaches: 14 Manny Acta (bench); 66 Fleming Baez (bullpen catcher); 6 Perry Hill (first base); 38 Jim Brower (bullpen); 28 Paul Davis (pitching); 13 Chris Prieto (third base); 21 Tim Laker (hitting); 48 Jared Sandberg (field coordinator) |

== Player stats ==
=== Batting ===
Note: G = Games played; AB = At bats; R = Runs; H = Hits; 2B = Doubles; 3B = Triples; HR = Home runs; RBI = Runs batted in; SB = Stolen bases; BB = Walks; AVG = Batting average; SLG = Slugging average

| Player | G | AB | R | H | 2B | 3B | HR | RBI | SB | BB | AVG | SLG |
|---|---|---|---|---|---|---|---|---|---|---|---|---|
| Mallex Smith | 134 | 510 | 70 | 116 | 19 | 9 | 6 | 37 | 46 | 42 | .227 | .335 |
| Daniel Vogelbach | 144 | 462 | 73 | 96 | 17 | 0 | 30 | 76 | 0 | 92 | .208 | .439 |
| Domingo Santana | 121 | 451 | 63 | 114 | 20 | 1 | 21 | 69 | 8 | 50 | .253 | .441 |
| Omar Narváez | 132 | 428 | 63 | 119 | 12 | 0 | 22 | 55 | 0 | 47 | .278 | .460 |
| Dee Strange-Gordon | 117 | 393 | 36 | 108 | 12 | 6 | 3 | 34 | 22 | 18 | .275 | .359 |
| Kyle Seager | 106 | 393 | 55 | 94 | 19 | 1 | 23 | 63 | 2 | 44 | .239 | .468 |
| J. P. Crawford | 93 | 345 | 43 | 78 | 21 | 4 | 7 | 46 | 5 | 43 | .226 | .371 |
| Tim Beckham | 88 | 304 | 39 | 72 | 21 | 1 | 15 | 47 | 1 | 21 | .237 | .461 |
| Tom Murphy | 75 | 260 | 32 | 71 | 12 | 1 | 18 | 40 | 2 | 19 | .273 | .535 |
| Dylan Moore | 113 | 247 | 31 | 51 | 14 | 2 | 9 | 28 | 11 | 25 | .206 | .389 |
| Mitch Haniger | 63 | 246 | 46 | 54 | 13 | 1 | 15 | 32 | 4 | 30 | .220 | .463 |
| Edwin Encarnación | 65 | 241 | 48 | 58 | 7 | 0 | 21 | 49 | 0 | 41 | .241 | .531 |
| Austin Nola | 79 | 238 | 37 | 64 | 12 | 1 | 10 | 31 | 1 | 23 | .269 | .454 |
| Ryon Healy | 47 | 169 | 24 | 40 | 16 | 0 | 7 | 26 | 0 | 13 | .237 | .456 |
| Jay Bruce | 47 | 165 | 27 | 35 | 11 | 0 | 14 | 28 | 1 | 16 | .212 | .533 |
| Shed Long Jr. | 42 | 152 | 21 | 40 | 12 | 1 | 5 | 15 | 3 | 16 | .263 | .454 |
| Tim Lopes | 41 | 111 | 11 | 30 | 7 | 0 | 1 | 12 | 6 | 15 | .270 | .360 |
| Mac Williamson | 25 | 77 | 10 | 14 | 0 | 0 | 3 | 10 | 0 | 9 | .182 | .299 |
| Kyle Lewis | 18 | 71 | 10 | 19 | 5 | 0 | 6 | 13 | 0 | 3 | .268 | .592 |
| Braden Bishop | 27 | 56 | 3 | 6 | 0 | 0 | 0 | 4 | 0 | 3 | .107 | .107 |
| Keon Broxton | 29 | 52 | 5 | 6 | 0 | 0 | 2 | 5 | 2 | 8 | .115 | .231 |
| Jake Fraley | 12 | 40 | 3 | 6 | 2 | 0 | 0 | 1 | 0 | 0 | .150 | .200 |
| Ryan Court | 12 | 24 | 1 | 5 | 1 | 0 | 1 | 5 | 0 | 1 | .208 | .375 |
| Kristopher Negrón | 10 | 23 | 3 | 5 | 0 | 0 | 0 | 1 | 1 | 2 | .217 | .217 |
| Donovan Walton | 7 | 16 | 2 | 3 | 0 | 0 | 0 | 2 | 0 | 3 | .188 | .188 |
| Ichiro Suzuki | 2 | 5 | 0 | 0 | 0 | 0 | 0 | 0 | 0 | 1 | .000 | .000 |
| David Freitas | 1 | 2 | 1 | 0 | 0 | 0 | 0 | 1 | 0 | 1 | .000 | .000 |
| Pitcher totals | 162 | 19 | 1 | 1 | 1 | 0 | 0 | 0 | 0 | 2 | .053 | .105 |
| Team totals | 162 | 5500 | 758 | 1305 | 254 | 28 | 239 | 730 | 115 | 588 | .237 | .424 |

=== Pitching ===
Note: W = Wins; L = Losses; ERA = Earned run average; G = Games pitched; GS = Games started; SV = Saves; IP = Innings pitched; H = Hits allowed; R = Runs allowed; ER = Earned runs allowed; BB = Walks allowed; SO = Strikeouts

| Player | W | L | ERA | G | GS | SV | IP | H | R | ER | BB | SO |
|---|---|---|---|---|---|---|---|---|---|---|---|---|
| Marco Gonzales | 16 | 13 | 3.99 | 34 | 34 | 0 | 203.0 | 210 | 106 | 90 | 56 | 147 |
| Yusei Kikuchi | 6 | 11 | 5.46 | 32 | 32 | 0 | 161.2 | 195 | 109 | 98 | 50 | 116 |
| Mike Leake | 9 | 8 | 4.27 | 22 | 22 | 0 | 137.0 | 153 | 78 | 65 | 19 | 100 |
| Wade LeBlanc | 6 | 7 | 5.71 | 26 | 8 | 0 | 121.1 | 145 | 80 | 77 | 31 | 92 |
| Tommy Milone | 4 | 10 | 4.76 | 23 | 6 | 0 | 111.2 | 102 | 61 | 59 | 23 | 94 |
| Félix Hernández | 1 | 8 | 6.40 | 15 | 15 | 0 | 71.2 | 85 | 58 | 51 | 25 | 57 |
| Erik Swanson | 1 | 5 | 5.74 | 27 | 8 | 2 | 58.0 | 56 | 41 | 37 | 12 | 52 |
| Anthony Bass | 2 | 4 | 3.56 | 44 | 0 | 5 | 48.0 | 30 | 20 | 19 | 17 | 43 |
| Brandon Brennan | 3 | 6 | 4.56 | 44 | 0 | 0 | 47.1 | 34 | 25 | 24 | 24 | 47 |
| Roenis Elías | 4 | 2 | 3.64 | 44 | 0 | 14 | 47.0 | 41 | 28 | 19 | 17 | 45 |
| Cory Gearrin | 0 | 2 | 3.92 | 48 | 2 | 0 | 41.1 | 38 | 18 | 18 | 21 | 39 |
| Justus Sheffield | 0 | 1 | 5.50 | 8 | 7 | 0 | 36.0 | 44 | 22 | 22 | 18 | 37 |
| Austin Adams | 2 | 2 | 3.77 | 29 | 2 | 0 | 31.0 | 20 | 13 | 13 | 14 | 51 |
| Connor Sadzeck | 0 | 1 | 2.66 | 20 | 0 | 1 | 23.2 | 18 | 10 | 7 | 15 | 27 |
| Sam Tuivailala | 1 | 0 | 2.35 | 23 | 2 | 0 | 23.0 | 13 | 6 | 6 | 11 | 27 |
| Matt Magill | 3 | 2 | 3.63 | 22 | 0 | 5 | 22.1 | 21 | 10 | 9 | 5 | 28 |
| Matt Festa | 0 | 2 | 5.64 | 20 | 0 | 0 | 22.1 | 20 | 15 | 14 | 12 | 21 |
| Matt Wisler | 1 | 2 | 6.04 | 23 | 8 | 0 | 22.1 | 22 | 17 | 15 | 6 | 29 |
| Reggie McClain | 1 | 1 | 6.00 | 14 | 2 | 0 | 21.0 | 22 | 14 | 14 | 13 | 11 |
| Zac Grotz | 1 | 0 | 4.15 | 14 | 0 | 0 | 17.1 | 14 | 9 | 8 | 8 | 18 |
| Chasen Bradford | 0 | 0 | 4.86 | 12 | 0 | 1 | 16.2 | 17 | 9 | 9 | 4 | 11 |
| Mike Wright | 0 | 0 | 6.75 | 9 | 0 | 0 | 16.0 | 24 | 16 | 12 | 5 | 16 |
| Dan Altavilla | 2 | 1 | 5.52 | 17 | 0 | 0 | 14.2 | 9 | 9 | 9 | 12 | 18 |
| Zac Rosscup | 2 | 0 | 3.21 | 19 | 0 | 0 | 14.0 | 13 | 8 | 5 | 14 | 20 |
| Anthony Swarzak | 2 | 2 | 5.27 | 15 | 0 | 3 | 13.2 | 14 | 11 | 8 | 8 | 17 |
| Taylor Guilbeau | 0 | 0 | 3.65 | 17 | 0 | 0 | 12.1 | 10 | 6 | 5 | 3 | 7 |
| Jesse Biddle | 0 | 0 | 9.82 | 11 | 0 | 0 | 11.0 | 20 | 14 | 12 | 7 | 8 |
| Matt Carasiti | 0 | 1 | 4.66 | 11 | 5 | 0 | 9.2 | 11 | 6 | 5 | 5 | 10 |
| Gerson Bautista | 0 | 1 | 11.00 | 8 | 2 | 0 | 9.0 | 13 | 11 | 11 | 9 | 7 |
| Tayler Scott | 0 | 0 | 9.39 | 5 | 2 | 0 | 7.2 | 11 | 10 | 8 | 6 | 7 |
| David McKay | 0 | 0 | 5.14 | 7 | 0 | 0 | 7.0 | 5 | 5 | 4 | 8 | 5 |
| Justin Dunn | 0 | 0 | 2.70 | 4 | 4 | 0 | 6.2 | 2 | 2 | 2 | 9 | 5 |
| Art Warren | 1 | 0 | 0.00 | 6 | 0 | 0 | 5.1 | 2 | 0 | 0 | 2 | 5 |
| Andrew Moore | 0 | 0 | 7.71 | 1 | 1 | 0 | 4.2 | 6 | 4 | 4 | 1 | 2 |
| Parker Markel | 0 | 0 | 15.43 | 5 | 0 | 0 | 4.2 | 10 | 9 | 8 | 4 | 3 |
| R. J. Alaniz | 0 | 0 | 20.25 | 4 | 0 | 0 | 4.0 | 11 | 10 | 9 | 3 | 6 |
| Shawn Armstrong | 0 | 1 | 14.73 | 4 | 0 | 0 | 3.2 | 8 | 6 | 6 | 3 | 3 |
| Hunter Strickland | 0 | 1 | 8.10 | 4 | 0 | 2 | 3.1 | 2 | 3 | 3 | 0 | 3 |
| Tom Murphy | 0 | 0 | 6.00 | 3 | 0 | 0 | 3.0 | 1 | 2 | 2 | 1 | 2 |
| Ryan Garton | 0 | 0 | 12.00 | 2 | 0 | 0 | 3.0 | 4 | 4 | 4 | 1 | 1 |
| Nick Rumbelow | 0 | 0 | 27.00 | 3 | 0 | 1 | 1.1 | 3 | 4 | 4 | 1 | 2 |
| Dylan Moore | 0 | 0 | 36.00 | 1 | 0 | 0 | 1.0 | 5 | 4 | 4 | 2 | 0 |
| Team totals | 68 | 94 | 4.99 | 162 | 162 | 34 | 1439.1 | 1484 | 893 | 798 | 505 | 1239 |

== Farm system ==
| Level | Team | League | Manager |
|---|---|---|---|
| AAA | Tacoma Rainiers | Pacific Coast League | Daren Brown |
| AA | Arkansas Travelers | Texas League | Mitch Canham, Cesar Nicolas |
| A-Advanced | Modesto Nuts | California League | Denny Hocking |
| A | West Virginia Power | South Atlantic League | Dave Berg |
| A-Short Season | Everett AquaSox | Northwest League | José Moreno, Louis Boyd |
| Rookie | AZL Mariners | Arizona League | Zac Livingston |
| Rookie | DSL Mariners | Dominican Summer League | Austin Knight |
