= Mel Stottlemyre Jr. =

American baseball player and coach (born 1963)

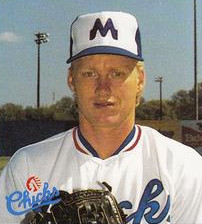
- Stottlemyre Jr. in 1988
- Pitcher / Pitching coach
- Born: December 28, 1963 (age 62); Prosser, Washington, U.S.
- Batted: Right Threw: Right

MLB debut
- July 17, 1990, for the Kansas City Royals

Last MLB appearance
- September 11, 1990, for the Kansas City Royals

MLB statistics
- Win–loss record: 0–1
- Earned run average: 4.88
- Strikeouts: 14
- Stats at Baseball Reference

Teams
- As player: Kansas City Royals (1990); As coach: Arizona Diamondbacks (2009–2010, 2014–2015); Seattle Mariners (2016–2018); Miami Marlins (2019–2024)

Melvin Leon Stottlemyre Jr. (born December 28, 1963) is an American professional baseball pitching coach and a former right-handed pitcher who played in Major League Baseball (MLB) for the Kansas City Royals.

Listed at 6 ft (1.8 m), 190 lb (86 kg), Stottlemyre is the son of former New York Yankees starting pitcher and longtime MLB pitching coach Mel Stottlemyre and the elder brother of Todd Stottlemyre, who won 138 games during a 14-year big-league career.

== Amateur career ==
Stottlemyre attended the University of Nevada-Las Vegas, and in 1984 he played collegiate summer baseball with the Harwich Mariners of the Cape Cod Baseball League.

== Professional career ==
=== Houston Astros ===
Stottlemyre was selected in the 1982 Major League Baseball draft by the Seattle Mariners, but did not sign. He was later drafted in the January Secondary 1985 Major League Baseball draft by the Houston Astros. Stottlemyre began his playing career in 1985 with the Class-A Asheville Tourists of the South Atlantic League in the Astros organization. In his first year, he went 5–4 with a 2.75 earned run average (ERA) in 14 games, 13 starts.

In 1986, Stottlemyre split the season between the Class-A Asheville Tourists and the Class-A Osceola Astros. He went 3–1 with a 2.10 ERA in seven games, all starts. With Osceola, Stottlemyre went 0–7 with a 7.82 ERA in nine games, eight starts. This gave him a combined record of 3–8 with a 5.01 ERA on the year.

Stottlemyre began the 1987 season with the Double-A Columbus Astros of the Southern League. He was traded by the Astros to the Kansas City Royals on July 29, 1987 for Buddy Biancalana.

=== Kansas City Royals ===
After the trade, Stottlemyre was assigned to the Double-A Memphis Chicks of the Southern League. He went a combined 7–6 with a 4.31 ERA in 20 games, all starts.

He played the 1988 season with the Double-A Memphis Chicks. He went 3–2 with a 2.40 ERA in seven games, all starts.

In a one-season career at the Major League level in 1990, Stottlemyre posted a 0–1 record with 14 strikeouts, a 4.88 ERA, and 31⅓ innings in 13 games pitched, two as a starter.

== Coaching career ==
Stottlemyre began his coaching career while with the University of Nevada-Las Vegas, serving as their pitching coach. Stottlemyre also served as a pitching coach for the Single-A Yakima Bears in 2002, the Single-A Lancaster JetHawks, the Double-A El Paso Diablos, and the Rookie-level Missoula Osprey in 2005–2006.

=== Arizona Diamondbacks ===
On May 7, 2009, Stottlemyre was hired as the pitching coach for the Arizona Diamondbacks. He was released as pitching coach after the 2010 season, but remained in the D-backs' organization as a roving minor-league pitching instructor. On December 2, 2013, he returned to the Diamondbacks' Major League staff as bullpen coach under manager Kirk Gibson.

=== Seattle Mariners ===
On October 26, 2015, Stottlemyre was announced as the new pitching coach for the Seattle Mariners during manager Scott Servais' inaugural press conference. He replaced Rick Waits, who was hired after the 2013 season.

=== Miami Marlins ===
On December 5, 2018, Stottlemyre was hired as pitching coach for the Miami Marlins.

In October 2021, Stottlemyre revealed that he had been diagnosed with prostate cancer in February of the same year. Stottlemyre had his prostate removed in October and announced that he still planned to coach the 2022 season.

On October 31, 2022, the Marlins signed Stottlemyre to a multi–year contract extension. On October 2, 2024, Stottlemyre was fired alongside the entirety of the Marlins coaching staff.

== See also ==
- List of second-generation Major League Baseball players

Sporting positions
Preceded by Bryan Price	Arizona Diamondbacks pitching coach 2009–2010	Succeeded by Charles Nagy
Preceded by Glenn Sherlock	Arizona Diamondbacks bullpen coach 2014–2015	Succeeded by Garvin Alston
Preceded by Rick Waits	Seattle Mariners pitching coach 2016–2018	Succeeded by Paul Davis
Preceded by Juan Nieves	Miami Marlins pitching coach 2019–2024	Succeeded by Daniel Moskos
