= Austin Adams (baseball, born 1991) =

American baseball player (born 1991)

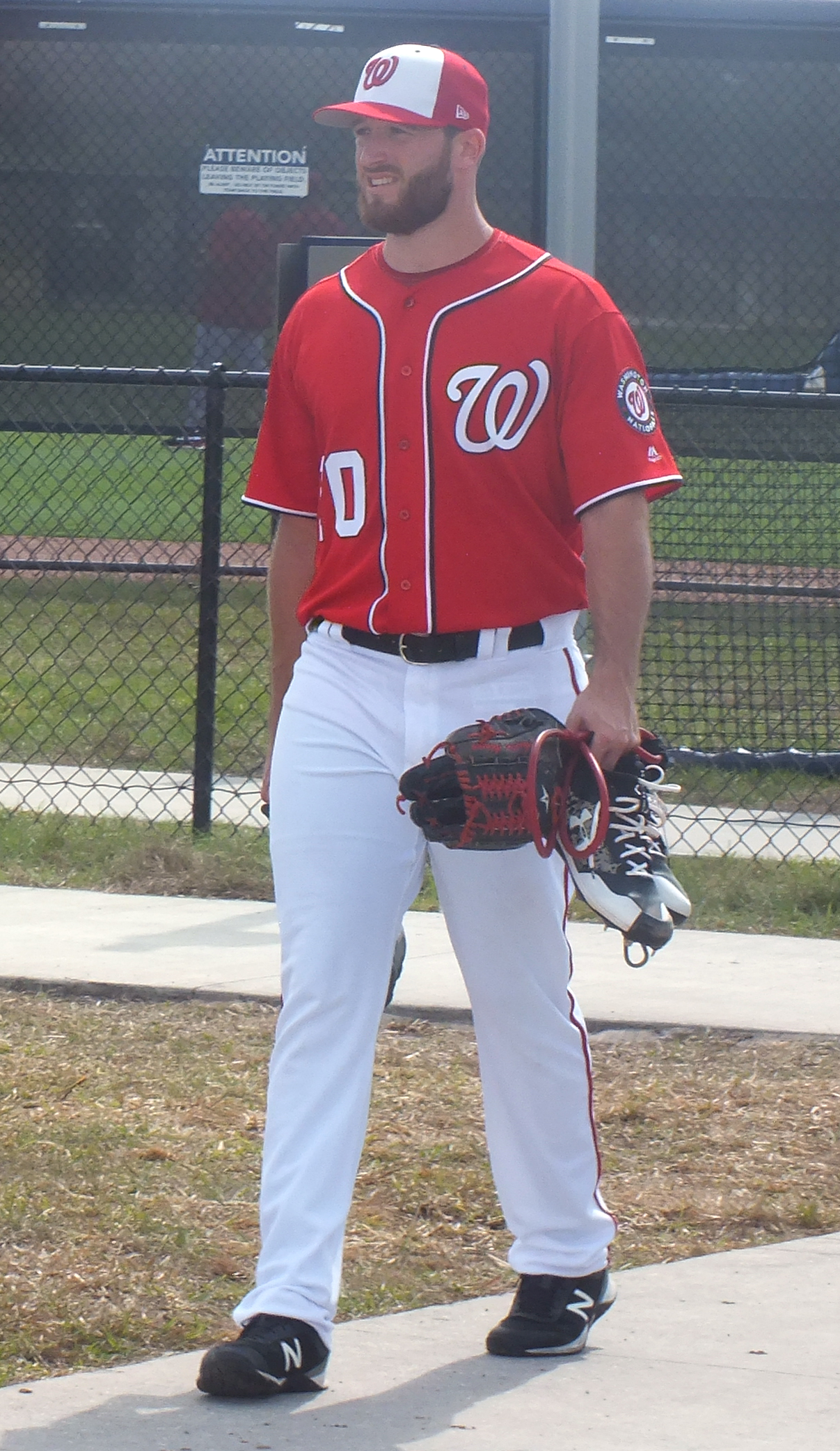
- Adams with the Washington Nationals in 2017

Free agent
- Pitcher
- Born: May 5, 1991 (age 35); Tampa, Florida, U.S.
- Bats: Right Throws: Right

MLB debut
- July 15, 2017, for the Washington Nationals

MLB statistics (through 2024 season)
- Win–loss record: 7–7
- Earned run average: 4.10
- Strikeouts: 223
- Stats at Baseball Reference

Teams
- Washington Nationals (2017–2019); Seattle Mariners (2019); San Diego Padres (2020–2022); Arizona Diamondbacks (2023); Oakland Athletics (2024)

Austin Lance Adams (born May 5, 1991) is an American professional baseball pitcher who is a free agent. He has previously played in Major League Baseball (MLB) for the Washington Nationals, Seattle Mariners, San Diego Padres, Arizona Diamondbacks, and Oakland Athletics.

== Career ==
Adams attended Zephyrhills High School in Zephyrhills, Florida, where he played baseball and basketball and played college baseball at the University of South Florida. He pursued a degree in physical education. In 2012, his junior year, he went 1–2 with a 1.95 ERA in 27 2/3 relief innings pitched.

=== Los Angeles Angels ===
The Los Angeles Angels of Anaheim selected Adams in the eighth round of the 2012 Major League Baseball draft. He began his professional career playing for the Orem Owlz in the Rookie Advanced-level Pioneer League during the 2012 season. He spent 2013 with the Single–A Burlington Bees in the Midwest League and 2014 with the High–A Inland Empire 66ers in the California League. He began the 2015 season with Inland Empire, then was promoted during the season first to the Double–A Arkansas Travelers in the Texas League and then to the Triple–A Salt Lake Bees in the Pacific Coast League. He split the 2016 season between the rookie-level AZL Angels in the Arizona League and the Double–A Arkansas Travelers.

On November 18, 2016, the Angels added Adams to their 40-man roster to protect him from the Rule 5 draft.

=== Washington Nationals ===
On December 10, 2016, the Angels traded Adams and Kyle McGowin to the Washington Nationals in exchange for infielder Danny Espinosa.

==== 2017 ====
Adams began the 2017 season with the Triple–A Syracuse Chiefs of the International League. With the Nationals' bullpen struggling over the first half of the 2017 season, Adams was mentioned by The Washington Post in a July 12 article among several minor league pitchers the team could consider calling upon as reinforcements. Two days later, Adams was called up to the big leagues for the first time, along with Syracuse teammate Trevor Gott, after the Nationals optioned struggling left-handed reliever Sammy Solis and assigned ailing starter Joe Ross to the disabled list with an elbow sprain. Adams made his major league debut on July 15, 2017, against the Cincinnati Reds, loading the bases on an error, a walk, and a wild pitch and then walking in a run and allowing a single before he was pulled from the game. Adams was optioned back to Syracuse on July 18, his earned run average still standing at infinity due to the earned run he allowed without recording an out. Adams was recalled by the Nationals on September 1, 2017, and recorded his first major league outs in an inning of relief against the Milwaukee Brewers on September 3, after loading the bases.

==== 2018 ====
Adams began 2018 with Triple-A Syracuse. On April 22, the Nationals called him up to the major leagues. He pitched on April 25 in a 15-2 Washington win over the San Francisco Giants at AT&T Park in San Francisco, giving up a hit and a walk but no runs in one inning of work. On April 28, Nationals manager Dave Martinez brought him in to relieve left-hander Sammy Solis in the 10th inning of a game at Nationals Park in Washington, D.C., against the Arizona Diamondbacks with one out, runners on second and third, and the score tied 3–3. Martinez intended Adams to face right-handed utility player Chris Owings, who was waiting in the on-deck circle. However, Martinez made the mistake of making the pitching change before Owings had officially entered the game. With Adams in, Diamondbacks manager Torey Lovullo took advantage of Martinez's error by recalling Owings and keeping left-handed outfielder Jarrod Dyson in place, forcing Adams to face a left-hander rather than a right-hander as Martinez had intended. Adams walked Dyson to load the bases. With only one reliever – Carlos Torres – remaining in the Washington bullpen, Martinez left Adams in to face the next batter, center fielder A. J. Pollock, as well, and Adams also walked Pollock, forcing in what turned out to be the winning run in a 4–3 Diamondbacks victory. On April 29, the Nationals optioned Adams back to Syracuse. Adams was designated for assignment on April 30, 2019, following the selecting of Dan Jennings’ contract.

=== Seattle Mariners ===
On May 4, 2019, the Nationals traded Adams to the Seattle Mariners for left-handed minor league pitcher Nick Wells and cash considerations. He was subsequently assigned to the Triple-A Tacoma Rainiers. On May 13, Adams was called up to the major league roster. He registered an ERA of 3.77 in 29 games.

=== San Diego Padres ===
On August 30, 2020, the Mariners traded Adams, Austin Nola, and Dan Altavilla to the San Diego Padres in exchange for Ty France, Taylor Trammell, Andrés Muñoz, and Luis Torrens.

Adams had problems with control in his 2021 MLB season. On September 1, 2021, Adams became the first MLB pitcher to ever register 20 or more hit by pitch with less than 50 IPs in a season. Adams is the first pitcher to record a HBP 20 times or more since 2004. During his 8-pitch outing, he hit batters 2 times, walked 1 batter, gave up 1 hit, and registered 0 strikes.

On September 12, he became the first pitcher since 1923 to record 23 or more hit by pitches in a season. His final HBP of the season was on September 17, against Yadier Molina of the St. Louis Cardinals in the bottom of the 8th inning. Adams finished the season with 24 HBPs, a new record in the live-ball era. (His record would be broken by Anthony Kay of the Chicago White Sox in 2026.)

On March 22, 2022, Adams signed a $925,000 contract with the Padres, avoiding salary arbitration. On April 28, Adams was placed on the 60-day injured list after receiving a platelet-rich plasma injection for a strained right forearm. On August 5, Adams underwent season-ending flexor tendon surgery. He appeared in only 2 games for the Padres that year, tossing 2.1 scoreless innings and recording a win. On November 10, Adams was removed from the 40-man roster and sent outright to the Triple–A El Paso Chihuahuas; he elected free agency the same day.

=== Arizona Diamondbacks ===
On January 25, 2023, Adams signed a minor league contract with the Arizona Diamondbacks organization. He was assigned to the Triple-A Reno Aces to begin the year, where he made 12 appearances and recorded a 2.84 ERA with 20 strikeouts and 3 saves in 12 2/3 innings pitched. On May 20, Adams's contract was selected to the major league roster. In 25 games for the Diamondbacks, he posted a 5.71 ERA with 22 strikeouts across 17 1/3 innings of work. On August 1, Adams was pulled from an appearance against the San Francisco Giants after he was struck in the right ankle by a Joc Pederson comebacker. The next day, it was announced that he had suffered a fractured ankle and would miss the remainder of the season. Following the season on November 6, Adams was removed from the 40–man roster and sent outright to Triple–A Reno; he subsequently elected free agency the same day.

=== New York Mets ===
On November 30, 2023, Adams signed a one-year contract with the New York Mets. However, he was designated for assignment on February 6, 2024, in order to make room for Jake Diekman on the 40-man roster. On February 11, he cleared waivers and accepted an outright assignment to the Triple–A Syracuse Mets.

=== Oakland Athletics ===
On March 24, 2024, the Mets traded Adams to the Oakland Athletics in exchange for cash considerations. He was subsequently added the team's 40-man roster, replacing the injured Trevor Gott. In 56 games for Oakland, he compiled a 3.92 ERA with 53 strikeouts over 41 1/3 innings pitched. On October 31, Adams was removed from the 40–man roster and sent outright to the Triple–A Las Vegas Aviators. He elected free agency following the season on November 4.

=== Boston Red Sox ===
On December 22, 2024, Adams signed a minor league contract with the Boston Red Sox. He made 24 appearances for the Triple-A Worcester Red Sox, struggling to a 1–2 record and 9.13 ERA with 34 strikeouts across 23 2/3 innings pitched. Adams was released by the Red Sox organization on July 28, 2025.

=== Tecolotes de los Dos Laredos ===
On March 25, 2026, Adams signed with the Tecolotes de los Dos Laredos of the Mexican League. In 16 relief appearances, he posted an 0–1 record with a 2.63 ERA and 17 strikeouts across 13 2/3 innings pitched. On May 28, Adams was released by Dos Laredos.

== Pitching style ==
In 2014, a report on Scout.com took note of Adams' "loud, earth-shattering slider", describing it as a pitch "like hardly any other". Adams also throws a fastball in the 92-94 mph range. Despite an effective two-pitch mix, Adams has been noted for problems with his command, walking more than seven batters per nine innings in the first half of the 2017 season with the Class-AAA Syracuse Chiefs. Adams' problems with control came back in the 2021 MLB season. He led the league in hit by pitches (HBP) with 24 HBPs despite being a reliever with fewer innings pitched than most other pitchers.
