= Connor Sadzeck =

American baseball player (born 1991)

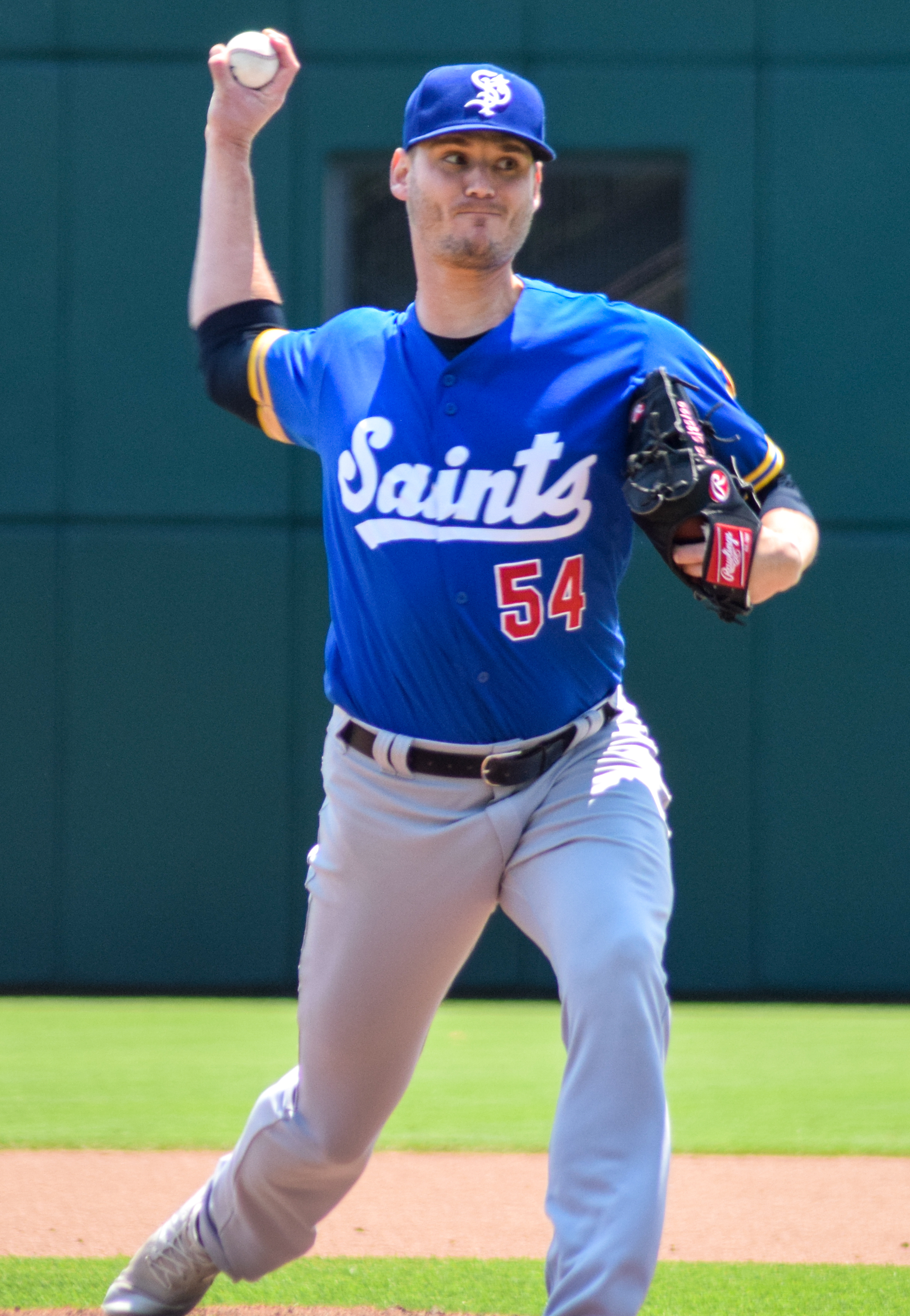
- Sadzeck with the St. Paul Saints in 2023

Free agent
- Pitcher
- Born: October 1, 1991 (age 34); Crystal Lake, Illinois, U.S.
- Bats: Right Throws: Right

MLB debut
- September 1, 2018, for the Texas Rangers

MLB statistics (through 2022 season)
- Win–loss record: 0–1
- Earned run average: 2.75
- Strikeouts: 36
- Stats at Baseball Reference

Teams
- Texas Rangers (2018); Seattle Mariners (2019); Milwaukee Brewers (2022)

Connor William Sadzeck (born October 1, 1991) is an American professional baseball pitcher who is a free agent. He has previously played in Major League Baseball (MLB) for the Texas Rangers, Seattle Mariners, and Milwaukee Brewers.

== Career ==
=== Amateur career ===
Sadzeck attended Crystal Lake Central High School in Crystal Lake, Illinois, and played for the school's baseball team. The Pittsburgh Pirates selected Sadzeck in the 45th round of the 2010 Major League Baseball draft. He did not sign and attended Howard College.

=== Texas Rangers ===
==== Minor leagues ====
Sadzeck was then drafted by the Texas Rangers in the 11th round, with the 354th overall selection, of the 2011 Major League Baseball draft and signed for a $350,000 signing bonus.

Sadzeck made his professional debut in 2012 with the Low-A Spokane Indians and he spent the whole season there, going 1–4 with a 4.06 earned run average (ERA) in 15 games. He spent 2013 with the Single-A Hickory Crawdads where he compiled a 12–4 record, 2.25 ERA, and a 1.16 WHIP in 24 starts. He missed the 2014 season after undergoing Tommy John surgery. Sadzeck spent 2015 with both the High-A High Desert Mavericks and Double-A Frisco RoughRiders, posting a combined 3–2 record and 5.82 ERA in 60 1/3 innings pitched.

The Rangers added him to their 40-man roster after the 2015 season, in order to protect him from the Rule 5 draft. In 2016, he played for Frisco where he was 10–8 with a 4.16 ERA in 25 games (23 starts), and in 2017, he once again pitched for Frisco, going 4–8 with a 6.25 ERA in 38 games (13 starts). He spent the 2018 minor league season with the Triple-A Round Rock Express, going 5–3 with a 4.03 ERA in 38 innings.

==== Major leagues ====
Sadzeck made his MLB debut on September 1, 2018. He pitched in 13 major league games in 2018, posting a 0.96 ERA, 7 strikeouts, and 11 walks in 9 innings. Sadzeck used his third and final minor league option during the 2018 season. On March 28, 2019, he was designated for assignment by the Rangers.

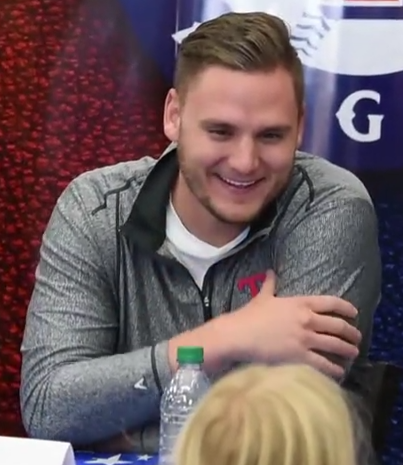
Sadzeck at Dyess Air Force Base with the Rangers in 2019

=== Seattle Mariners ===
On April 1, 2019, Sadzeck was traded to the Seattle Mariners in exchange for Grant Anderson. In 20 appearances for Seattle, he posted a 2.66 ERA with 27 strikeouts across 23 2/3 innings pitched. On October 28, Sadzeck was removed from the 40-man roster and sent outright to the Triple-A Tacoma Rainiers.

=== Chicago White Sox ===
On February 25, 2020, Sadzeck signed a minor league contract with the Chicago White Sox. He did not play in a game in 2020 due to the cancellation of the minor league season because of the COVID-19 pandemic.

Sadzeck made 23 appearances for the Triple-A Charlotte Knights in 2021, registering a 2-2 record and 5.86 ERA with 18 strikeouts across 27 2/3 innings pitched. He was released by the White Sox organization on August 3, 2021.

=== Milwaukee Brewers ===
On August 11, 2021, Sadzeck signed a minor league contract with the Milwaukee Brewers. He was assigned to the Triple-A Nashville Sounds, for whom he made 17 appearances down the stretch, logging a 3.18 ERA with 21 strikeouts over 17 innings pitched.

On July 13, 2022, the Brewers selected Sadzeck's contract, adding him to their active roster. In 2 appearances for Milwaukee, he struggled to a 9.00 ERA with 2 strikeouts across 3 innings of work. Sadzeck was designated for assignment following the promotion of Ethan Small on July 25. He elected free agency on July 30.

=== Washington Nationals ===
On August 4, 2022, Sadzeck signed a minor league deal with the Washington Nationals. Sadzeck pitched in 17 games for the Triple-A Rochester Red Wings, posting an 0-3 record and 3.86 ERA with 21 strikeouts in 21.0 innings of work. He elected free agency following the season on November 10.

=== Minnesota Twins ===
On February 10, 2023, Sadzeck signed a minor league contract with the Minnesota Twins organization. In 25 games for the Triple–A St. Paul Saints, he recorded a 5.40 ERA with 42 strikeouts and 1 save in 35.0 innings of work. Sadzeck was released by the Twins on July 5.

=== Pittsburgh Pirates ===
On February 2, 2024, Sadzeck signed a minor league contract with the Pittsburgh Pirates. In 49 relief appearances for the Triple-A Indianapolis Indians, he compiled a 4-3 record and 4.66 ERA with 67 strikeouts and 9 saves across 63 2/3 innings pitched. Sadzeck elected free agency following the season on November 4.

=== Tecolotes de los Dos Laredos ===
On May 12, 2025, Sadzeck signed with the Tecolotes de los Dos Laredos of the Mexican League. In 25 appearances for Dos Laredos (including one start), he logged a 4-1 record and 4.20 ERA with 26 strikeouts and one save 30 innings of work. On February 9, 2026, Sadzeck was released by the Tecolotes.
