= Hunter Strickland =

American baseball player (born 1988)

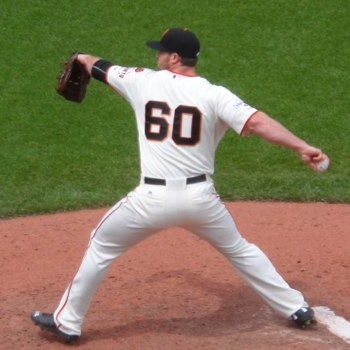
- Strickland with the San Francisco Giants in 2015

Free agent
- Pitcher
- Born: September 24, 1988 (age 38); Thomaston, Georgia, U.S.
- Bats: Right Throws: Right

MLB debut
- September 1, 2014, for the San Francisco Giants

MLB statistics (through 2025 season)
- Win–loss record: 26–25
- Earned run average: 3.39
- Strikeouts: 422
- Saves: 30
- Stats at Baseball Reference

Teams
- San Francisco Giants (2014–2018); Seattle Mariners (2019); Washington Nationals (2019); New York Mets (2020); Tampa Bay Rays (2021); Los Angeles Angels (2021); Milwaukee Brewers (2021); Cincinnati Reds (2022); Los Angeles Angels (2024–2025)

Career highlights and awards
- 2× World Series champion (2014, 2019)

Hunter Drew Strickland (born September 24, 1988) is an American professional baseball pitcher who is a free agent. He has previously played in Major League Baseball (MLB) for the San Francisco Giants, Seattle Mariners, Washington Nationals, New York Mets, Tampa Bay Rays, Los Angeles Angels, Milwaukee Brewers, and Cincinnati Reds.

== Early life ==
Hunter Drew Strickland was born on September 24, 1988, in Thomaston, Georgia. He attended Pike County High School In Zebulon, Georgia.

== Professional career ==
=== Draft and minor leagues ===
Strickland was drafted by the Boston Red Sox in the 18th round, 564th overall pick, of the 2007 Major League Baseball draft. He made his professional debut with the rookie-level Gulf Coast League Red Sox, logging a 6.04 ERA and 22 strikeouts in nine appearances. The next year, Strickland played for the Low-A Lowell Spinners, and pitched to a 5-3 record and 3.18 ERA with 59 strikeouts in 15 games. He was assigned to the Single-A Greenville Drive to begin the 2009 season, and posted a 5-4 record and 3.35 ERA with 51 strikeouts across 83 1/3 innings of work.

On July 22, 2009, Strickland was traded to the Pittsburgh Pirates along with Argenis Díaz in exchange for Adam LaRoche. He finished the year with the Single-A West Virginia Power, registering a 4-2 record and 3.77 ERA with 23 strikeouts in eight games. Strickland split the 2010 season between West Virginia and the High-A Bradenton Marauders, accumulating a 2-5 record and 5.53 ERA with 25 strikeouts. However, his season was cut short due to a right elbow strain. Strickland missed the entire 2011 season with a rotator cuff injury that required surgery.

In 2012, Strickland split the year between the Double-A Altoona Curve and Bradenton, logging a 4-4 record and 3.70 ERA with 58 strikeouts in 33 appearances. On November 20, 2012, the Pirates added Strickland to the 40-man roster to protect him from the Rule 5 draft. On March 27, 2013, Strickland was designated for assignment by the Pirates.

On April 2, 2013, Strickland was claimed off waivers by the San Francisco Giants. Strickland underwent Tommy John surgery in May and was designated for assignment on July 23, and released the next day. However, he re-signed with the team on a minor league contract on July 28.

=== San Francisco Giants (2014–2018) ===
==== 2014 ====
Strickland was re-added to the Giants' 40-man roster on November 20, 2013.

After recording a 2.02 ERA in 38 appearances for the Double-A Richmond Flying Squirrels, Strickland was called up to the majors for the first time on September 1, 2014. He pitched one scoreless inning of relief against the Colorado Rockies later that day. In nine appearances during his rookie campaign, Strickland appeared in nine games, allowing five hits and no runs in seven innings pitched.

In Game 1 of the 2014 National League Division Series (NLDS) against the Washington Nationals, Strickland entered the game with the bases loaded and two outs in the sixth inning and struck out Ian Desmond to preserve the Giants' lead. In Game 2, Strickland recorded the save in the longest (by time, tied for longest in innings) playoff game in major league history, as the Giants defeated the Nationals 2–1 in 18 innings. However, Strickland set a postseason record for a reliever by allowing six home runs, even though the Giants went on to defeat the Kansas City Royals in the World Series.

==== 2015 ====
Strickland started the 2015 season with the Triple-A Sacramento River Cats, posting a 1.66 ERA with 25 strikeouts in 21 2/3 innings, before being called up on May 24, 2015. Strickland did not yield a home run until August 3, a string of 188 batters between Triple-A and the majors. Strickland appeared in 55 games, recording a 2.45 ERA with 50 strikeouts in 51 1/3 innings pitched. Strickland's 0.857 WHIP was the third-lowest among relievers with at least 50 innings pitched.

==== 2016 ====
In 2016, Strickland was named to the Opening Day roster for the first time in his career. He remained in the Giants bullpen throughout the season, with a 3.10 ERA.

==== 2017 ====
In a May 29, 2017, game against the Washington Nationals, Strickland hit Bryce Harper's right hip with a 98-mph fastball, which resulted in a benches-clearing brawl. Strickland had to be physically removed from the field by teammates after exchanging several punches with Harper. He received widespread criticism for his role in starting the brawl, as sports analysts and Harper have suggested that the intentional hit-by-pitch was the result of a grudge from the two home runs by Harper against him in the 2014 NLDS, a series the Giants ended up winning. The next day, on May 30, he was suspended for six games.

==== 2018 ====
With Mark Melancon heading to the disabled list at the beginning of the season, Strickland was named the Giants closer. He earned his first save in a 1-0 victory on Opening Day against the Los Angeles Dodgers. While playing against the Miami Marlins on June 18, Strickland allowed three runs, blowing a save, and the Giants lost 5–4. Shortly after a pitching change, Strickland punched a door out of frustration, which wound up fracturing his right hand. Strickland underwent surgery the next day, when the pinkie finger on his right hand was repaired. Strickland was ruled out for 6-8 weeks.

=== Seattle Mariners (2019) ===
On January 24, 2019, Strickland signed a one-year deal with the Seattle Mariners. On March 30, Strickland suffered a Grade 2 right lat strain, which put him out for a couple of months.

=== Washington Nationals (2019) ===
On July 31, 2019, the Mariners traded Strickland and Roenis Elías to the Washington Nationals in exchange for Aaron Fletcher, Taylor Guilbeau, and Elvis Alvarado. In 24 games with the Nationals, Strickland went 2-0 with a 5.14 ERA. Overall in 2019, combined with both teams, Strickland made 28 total relief appearances with a 2-1 record and a 5.55 ERA. The Nationals finished the 2019 year with a 93-69 record, clinching a wild card spot, and eventually went on to win the 2019 World Series over the Houston Astros, their first championship in franchise history. It was also the second time Strickland won a World Series in his career. During the NLDS against the Los Angeles Dodgers, he gave up his 9th career postseason home run, a record for relief pitchers. He was released by the Nationals on March 14, 2020.

=== New York Mets (2020) ===
On June 29, 2020, Strickland signed a minor league contract with the New York Mets organization. On July 23, it was announced that Strickland had made the Opening Day roster for the Mets. On July 30, Strickland was designated for assignment when Brian Dozier was added to the roster. He was outrighted on August 2. On August 31, Strickland was selected back to the active roster. Strickland's contract was selected on August 31 adding him to the active roster. That night he threw a scoreless inning of relief with two strikeouts, but was designated for assignment again the next day. Strickland elected free agency on October 15.

=== Tampa Bay Rays (2021) ===
On February 2, 2021, Strickland signed a minor league contract with the Tampa Bay Rays organization. On April 9, the Rays selected Strickland's contract, adding him to their active roster. In 13 appearances for Tampa Bay, Strickland recorded a 1.69 ERA with 16 strikeouts over 16 innings of work.

=== Los Angeles Angels (2021) ===
On May 15, 2021, Strickland was traded to the Los Angeles Angels in exchange for cash considerations or a player to be named later. In 9 appearances for the Angels, Strickland struggled to a 9.95 ERA before being designated for assignment on June 7.

=== Milwaukee Brewers (2021) ===
On June 12, 2021, Strickland was traded to the Milwaukee Brewers in exchange for cash considerations. In 35 appearances for Milwaukee, Strickland compiled a 3-2 record and 1.73 ERA with 38 strikeouts across 36 1/3 innings pitched.

=== Cincinnati Reds (2022) ===
On March 23, 2022, Strickland signed a one-year contract with the Cincinnati Reds. He made 66 appearances for Cincinnati in 2022, pitching to a 3-3 record and 4.91 ERA with 60 strikeouts and 7 saves in 62 1/3 innings of work.

On February 18, 2023, Strickland re-signed with the Reds on a minor league contract. Strickland was released by the organization on March 25. Two days later, he re-signed with the Reds on a new minor league contract. In 12 appearances for the Triple-A Louisville Bats, Strickland struggled with a 11.45 ERA with 8 strikeouts in 11 innings pitched. He was released by the Reds organization on May 9.

=== Los Angeles Angels (2024) ===
On February 16, 2024, Strickland signed a minor league contract with the Angels. On April 8, after two games for the Triple-A Salt Lake Bees, his contract was selected to the major league roster. In 72 appearances for the Angels, Strickland had a 3–2 record and 3.31 ERA with 57 strikeouts across 73 1/3 innings pitched.

=== Texas Rangers ===
On March 12, 2025, Strickland signed a minor league contract with the Texas Rangers that included an invitation to spring training. He was released by the Rangers prior to the start of the season on March 21. However, he re-signed with the organization on a new minor league contract the following day. In 12 appearances for the Triple-A Round Rock Express, Strickland struggled to a 1–2 record and 8.22 ERA with 15 strikeouts across 15 1/3 innings pitched. He was released by the Rangers organization on May 6.

=== Los Angeles Angels (2025) ===
On May 6, 2025, Strickland signed a minor league contract with the Los Angeles Angels. After three appearances for the Triple-A Salt Lake Bees, the Angels added Strickland to their active roster on May 18. In 19 appearances for Los Angeles, he posted a 1–2 record and 3.27 ERA with 14 strikeouts and one save over 22 innings of work. On July 8, Strickland was placed on the 15-day injured list due to right shoulder inflammation. He was transferred to the 60-day injured list the following day.

On February 9, 2026, Strickland re-signed with the Angels organization on a minor league contract. He was released by Los Angeles before the start of the regular season on March 21. On March 27, Strickland re-signed with the Angels on a new minor league contract. He made 10 appearances (including one start) for Triple-A Salt Lake, struggling to an 0-2 record and 13.14 ERA with 13 strikeouts and one save across 12 1/3 innings pitched. Strickland was released by the Angels organization on May 4.

== Personal life ==
Strickland married his wife in November 2011. The couple had their first child in April 2017.
