= Elvis Alvarado =

Dominican baseball player (born 1999)

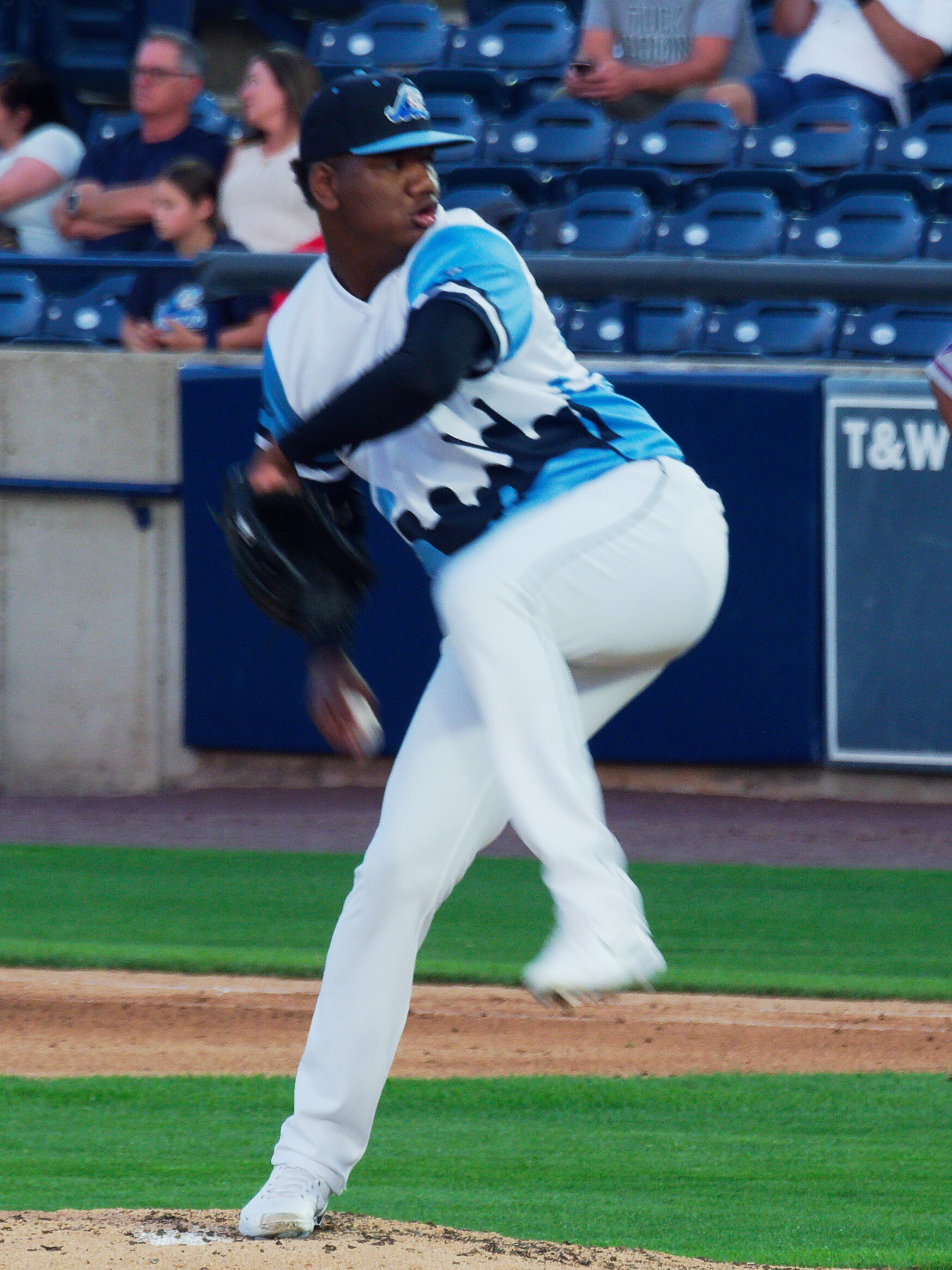
- Alvarado with the West Michigan Whitecaps in 2023

Athletics – No. 37
- Pitcher
- Born: February 23, 1999 (age 27); Sabaneta, Dominican Republic
- Bats: Right Throws: Right

MLB debut
- May 9, 2025, for the Athletics

MLB statistics (through 2026 season)
- Win–loss record: 6–5
- Earned run average: 3.59
- Strikeouts: 115
- Stats at Baseball Reference

Teams
- Athletics (2025–present)
Medals
Men's baseball
Representing Dominican Republic
World Baseball Classic
Bronze medal – third place	2026 Miami	Team

Elvis Ernesto Alvarado (born February 23, 1999) is a Dominican professional baseball pitcher for the Athletics of Major League Baseball (MLB). He made his MLB debut in 2025.

== Career ==
=== Washington Nationals ===
On July 16, 2015, Alvarado signed with the Washington Nationals as an outfielder. He made his professional debut in 2017 with the Dominican Summer League Nationals, hitting .139/.199/.228 with two home runs and nine RBI over 45 appearances. In 2018, Alvarado was converted into a pitcher. He made 10 appearances for the rookie–level Gulf Coast League Nationals, struggling to a 6.59 ERA with 13 strikeouts over 13 2/3 innings pitched. Alvarado began 2019 with the GCL Nationals, posting a 2–2 record and 6.00 ERA with 19 strikeouts across 7 games (2 starts).

=== Seattle Mariners ===
On July 31, 2019, Alvarado, Aaron Fletcher, and Taylor Guilbeau were traded to the Seattle Mariners in exchange for Hunter Strickland and Roenis Elías. Down the stretch, he made 6 appearances split between the rookie–level Arizona League Mariners and Single–A West Virginia Power. Alvarado did not play in a game in 2020 due to the cancellation of the minor league season because of the COVID-19 pandemic.

Alvarado spent the entirety of the 2021 campaign with the Single–A Modesto Nuts. In 31 appearances, he struggled to an 0–2 record and 6.60 ERA with 33 strikeouts across 45 innings pitched.

=== Detroit Tigers ===
On December 8, 2021, Alvarado was selected by the Detroit Tigers in the minor league phase of the Rule 5 draft. He split 2022 between the Single–A Lakeland Flying Tigers, High–A West Michigan Whitecaps, and Double–A Erie SeaWolves, registering an 8–3 record and 2.72 ERA with 63 strikeouts and 10 saves across 58 2/3 innings pitched.

Alvarado returned to the three affiliates in 2023, accumulating a 2–2 record and 5.18 ERA with 40 strikeouts over 33 innings of work. He elected free agency following the season on November 6, 2023.

=== Miami Marlins ===
On January 25, 2024, Alvarado signed a minor league contract organization. In 41 appearances split between the Single–A Jupiter Hammerheads and Triple–A Jacksonville Jumbo Shrimp, he accumulated a 3–4 record and 2.66 ERA with 74 strikeouts and 11 saves across 50 2/3 innings pitched. Alvarado elected free agency following the season on November 4.

=== Athletics ===
On December 10, 2024, Alvarado signed a major league contract with the Pittsburgh Pirates. He was designated for assignment following the signing of Adam Frazier on January 29, 2025.

On January 30, 2025, Alvarado was claimed off waivers by the Athletics. He was optioned to the Triple-A Las Vegas Aviators to begin the season, and posted a 3.45 ERA with 22 strikeouts and five saves across 14 appearances. On May 9, Alvarado was promoted to the major leagues for the first time. On August 10, he recorded his first career win, tossing 1 2/3 scoreless innings of relief against the Baltimore Orioles.

== See also ==
- Rule 5 draft results
