= Matt Magill =

American baseball player (born 1989)

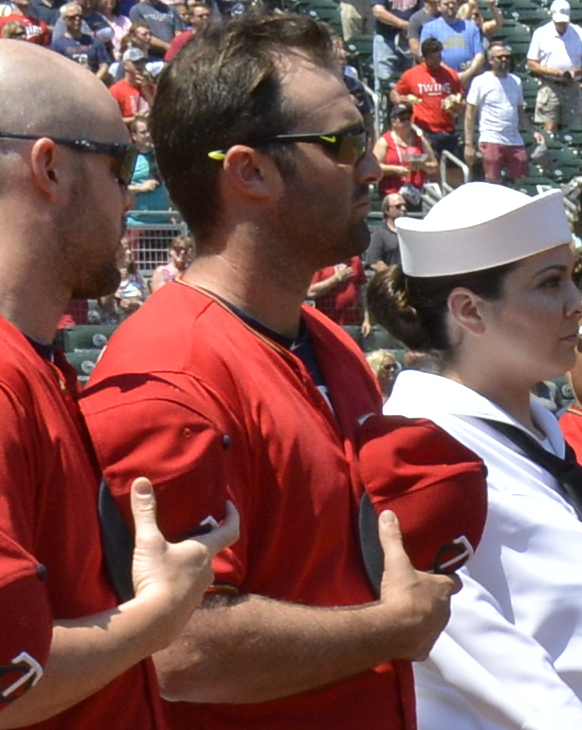
- Magill with the Minnesota Twins in 2018
- Pitcher
- Born: November 10, 1989 (age 36); Simi Valley, California, U.S.
- Batted: Right Threw: Right

MLB debut
- April 27, 2013, for the Los Angeles Dodgers

Last MLB appearance
- August 27, 2020, for the Seattle Mariners

MLB statistics
- Win–loss record: 8–8
- Earned run average: 4.63
- Strikeouts: 158
- Stats at Baseball Reference

Teams
- Los Angeles Dodgers (2013); Cincinnati Reds (2016); Minnesota Twins (2018–2019); Seattle Mariners (2019–2020)

Matthew William Magill (born November 10, 1989) is an American former professional baseball pitcher. He played in Major League Baseball (MLB) for the Los Angeles Dodgers, Cincinnati Reds, Minnesota Twins, and Seattle Mariners.

== Professional career ==
=== Los Angeles Dodgers ===
Magill was drafted by the Dodgers in the 31st round of the 2008 MLB draft out of Royal High School in Simi Valley, California. He played with the Gulf Coast Dodgers in 2008, Ogden Raptors in 2009, Great Lakes Loons in 2010 and Rancho Cucamonga Quakes in 2011. With the Double–A Chattanooga Lookouts in 2012 he was 11–8 with a 3.76 ERA and was selected to the Southern League midseason All-Star team. The Dodgers added him to the 40-man roster after the season and promoted him to the Triple–A Albuquerque Isotopes to start 2013.

He was called up to the Majors for the first time on April 27, 2013, to start against the Milwaukee Brewers. He pitched 6 2/3 innings while allowing two runs and striking out seven. Magill made 3 more starts with the Dodgers before he was optioned back to Triple-A Albuquerque on May 20. He had no record and a 5.00 ERA in his 4 starts. Magill was recalled again to make an emergency start in place of Hyun-Jin Ryu on June 2. Magill spent the entire 2014 season with the Isotopes, where he worked as both a starter and a reliever. He was in 36 games and started 12 of them. He was 7–6 with a 5.21 ERA.

=== Cincinnati Reds ===
On December 2, 2014, Magill was traded to the Cincinnati Reds in exchange for outfielder Chris Heisey. He made 3 starts for the Triple–A Louisville Bats before undergoing Tommy John surgery in May, which ended his season. He was released by the Reds organization on June 7, 2015, and re–signed with the club on a minor league contract on June 18.

Magill began the 2016 campaign in the minor leagues, rehabbing his injury with Louisville and the Double–A Pensacola Blue Wahoos. On September 12, 2016, the Reds selected Magill's contract, adding him to their active roster. In 5 appearances for Cincinnati, he compiled a 6.23 ERA with one strikeout across 4 1/3 innings of work. On October 10, Magill was removed from the 40–man roster and sent outright to Louisville. He elected free agency following the season on November 7.

=== San Diego Padres ===
On January 30, 2017, Magill signed a minor league contract with the San Diego Padres organization. He spent the season with the Triple–A El Paso Chihuahuas, also making one appearance for the rookie–level Arizona League Padres. In 19 games (17 starts) for El Paso, he went 6–5 with a 3.95 ERA and 73 strikeouts in 95 2/3 innings pitched. He elected free agency following the season on November 6.

=== Minnesota Twins ===
On January 24, 2018, Magill signed a minor league contract with the Minnesota Twins. His contract was selected by the Twins on April 28. Magill spent the remainder of the season pitching out of the bullpen, appearing in 40 games. He struck out 56 in 56 2/3 innings. He went 2–0 with a 4.45 ERA in 28 innings for the Twins in 2019, before being designated for assignment on July 21.

=== Seattle Mariners ===
On July 21, 2019, Magill was traded to the Seattle Mariners in exchange for cash considerations. In 22 games, Magill was 3–2 with 28 strikeouts in 22 1/3 innings.

Magill began the 2020 season with a 6.10 ERA with 11 strikeouts in 10 1/3 innings pitched across 11 appearances before being placed on the 10-day injured list with a right shoulder strain on August 28. He was later shifted to the 60-day injured list. On October 22, Magill was activated from the 60-day injured list, but was outrighted off of the 40-man roster and elected free agency. On November 5, 2020, Magill re-signed with Seattle on a minor league deal. On March 27, 2021, Magill was released by Seattle. On March 30, the Mariners re-signed Magill to a two-year, minor league contract. Magill did not appear in 2021.

On February 3, 2022, Magill announced his retirement. Magill later stated on Twitter that his reason for retirement was due to lingering shoulder injuries and that he "couldn't throw without discomfort and pain."
