= Aaron Fletcher =

American baseball player (born 1996)

Free agent
- Pitcher
- Born: February 25, 1996 (age 30); Geneseo, Illinois, U.S.
- Bats: Left Throws: Left

MLB debut
- August 22, 2020, for the Seattle Mariners

MLB statistics (through 2022 season)
- Win–loss record: 0–1
- Earned run average: 9.15
- Strikeouts: 15
- Stats at Baseball Reference

Teams
- Seattle Mariners (2020–2021); Pittsburgh Pirates (2022)

Aaron Eugene Fletcher (born February 25, 1996) is an American professional baseball pitcher who is a free agent. He has previously played in Major League Baseball (MLB) for the Seattle Mariners and Pittsburgh Pirates. He played college baseball for the University of Houston. Fletcher was drafted by the Washington Nationals in the 14th round of the 2018 MLB draft.

== Early life ==
Fletcher attended Langham Creek High School in Houston, Texas. He attended the University of Houston and played college baseball for the Cougars. Fletcher underwent Tommy John surgery on March 11, 2016. in 2018 after going 7-3 with a 2.19 ERA in 94.1 innings, Fletcher was named the AAC 2018 Pitcher of the Year.

== Career ==
=== Washington Nationals ===
Fletcher was drafted by the Washington Nationals in the 14th round, with the 431st overall selection, of the 2018 MLB draft. In 2018, he played for the Gulf Coast Nationals and the Auburn Doubledays, going 2–1 with a 2.90 ERA in 31 innings. He pitched for the Hagerstown Suns, Potomac Nationals, and Harrisburg Senators in the Washington organization in 2019, going a combined 5–4 with a 1.79 ERA in 60 innings.

=== Seattle Mariners ===
On July 31, 2019, the Nationals traded Fletcher, Taylor Guilbeau, and Elvis Alvarado to the Seattle Mariners in exchange for Roenis Elías and Hunter Strickland. He was assigned to the Arkansas Travelers, compiling a 3.46 ERA over 13 innings. Fletcher played for the Peoria Javelinas of the Arizona Fall League following the 2019 season, and was named a Fall League All-Star.

Fletcher had his contract selected to the active roster on August 21, 2020. He made his major league debut the next day, throwing a scoreless inning in relief against the Texas Rangers. In 2020, he pitched 4.1 innings for the Mariners. In 2021, Fletcher made 4 appearances for Seattle, struggling to a 12.27 ERA with 2 strikeouts. He spent the majority of the year with Triple-A Tacoma Rainiers, making 39 appearances and registering 4-0 record and 3.47 ERA with 45 strikeouts in 49.1 innings pitched.

=== Pittsburgh Pirates ===
On March 13, 2022, Fletcher was claimed off waivers by the Pittsburgh Pirates. He split time between the Triple-A Indianapolis Indians and the Pirates. In 9 appearances for Pittsburgh, he struggled to an 0-1 record and 6.94 ERA with 6 strikeouts in 11.2 innings pitched. Concurrently, his Indianapolis numbers were far better, with a 1.45 ERA with 9 strikeouts in 18.2 innings of work. On July 8, 2022, Fletcher was designated for assignment.

=== San Francisco Giants ===
On July 14, 2022, Fletcher was claimed off waivers by the San Francisco Giants. Following the waiver claim of Alex Young on July 18, Fletcher was removed from the 40-man roster and sent outright to the Triple-A Sacramento River Cats. He made 15 appearances for Triple-A Sacramento, struggling immensely to the tune of a 15.15 ERA with 12 strikeouts in 13.2 innings pitched.

Fletcher began the 2023 season with Sacramento, but was again hit hard, allowing 8 earned runs on 8 hits, 7 walks, and 2 strikeouts in 3.0 innings pitched. He was released by the Giants organization on April 20, 2023. Following his release, Fletcher underwent elbow surgery that had him out for the rest of the 2023 season.

=== York Revolution ===
On April 16, 2024, Fletcher signed with the York Revolution of the Atlantic League of Professional Baseball. In 24 games (23 starts) for the Revolution, he compiled a 6–5 record and 5.55 ERA with 95 strikeouts across 128 innings pitched. With York, Fletcher won the Atlantic League championship. He became a free agent following the season.

=== Caliente de Durango ===
On February 4, 2025, Fletcher signed with the Caliente de Durango of the Mexican League. In 11 appearances (four starts) for Durango, Fletcher struggled to an 0-3 record and 10.62 ERA with 13 strikeouts across 20 1/3 innings pitched.

=== Leones de Yucatán ===
On May 26, 2025, Fletcher was traded to the Leones de Yucatán of the Mexican League. He made two scoreless appearances for Yucatán, but was released by the team on June 2.
