= Taylor Guilbeau =

American baseball player (born 1993)

- Pitcher
- Born: May 12, 1993 (age 31); Baton Rouge, Louisiana, U.S.
- Batted: Left Threw: Left

MLB debut
- August 17, 2019, for the Seattle Mariners

Last MLB appearance
- August 20, 2020, for the Seattle Mariners

MLB statistics
- Win–loss record: 0–0
- Earned run average: 3.06
- Strikeouts: 9
- Stats at Baseball Reference

Teams
- Seattle Mariners (2019–2020)

Taylor Michael Guilbeau (born May 12, 1993) is an American former professional baseball relief pitcher. He played in Major League Baseball (MLB) for the Seattle Mariners.

== Career ==
Guilbeau was drafted out of Zachary High School in the 39th round by the New York Yankees in the 2011 Major League Baseball draft.

=== Washington Nationals ===
He did not sign, instead pitching for the Crimson Tide at the University of Alabama until he signed with the Washington Nationals after they drafted him in the 10th round in the 2015 draft.

After spending the 2018 season with the High–A Potomac Nationals, Guilbeau was selected as one of the Nationals' representatives in the Arizona Fall League, where he pitched for the Salt River Rafters. Guilbeau showed a marked uptick in his fastball velocity in Arizona, hitting 97 miles per hour (156 km/h) at times. Guilbeau gave up a tenth-inning walkoff home run in the Arizona Fall League title game on November 17, 2018, to Atlanta Braves prospect Braxton Davidson.

Heading into the 2019 season, Guilbeau was ranked as the Nationals' 24th-best prospect by MLB Pipeline. He wasn't invited to major league spring training, but he was called over from minor league camp to pitch as the Nationals tuned up for the regular season. He was assigned to the Double–A Harrisburg Senators for the season.

=== Seattle Mariners ===
On July 31, 2019, the Nationals traded Guilbeau, Aaron Fletcher, and Elvis Alvarado to the Seattle Mariners in exchange for Roenis Elías and Hunter Strickland. Following the trade, he was assigned to the Tacoma Rainiers.

On August 15, 2019, the Mariners selected Guilbeau's contract and promoted him to the major leagues. He made his major league debut on August 17 versus the Toronto Blue Jays.

=== Arizona Diamondbacks ===
On October 23, 2020, Guilbeau was claimed off waivers by the Arizona Diamondbacks. On February 6, 2021, Guilbeau was designated for assignment by Arizona following the signing of Joakim Soria was made official. He cleared waivers and was sent outright to the Triple–A Reno Aces on February 13. On April 23, Guilbeau was released by the Diamondbacks organization.
