= Zac Grotz =

American baseball player (born 1993)

Charros de Jalisco – No. 93
- Pitcher
- Born: February 17, 1993 (age 33); San Mateo, California, U.S.
- Bats: Right Throws: Right

MLB debut
- August 2, 2019, for the Seattle Mariners

MLB statistics (through 2020 season)
- Win–loss record: 1–0
- Earned run average: 6.17
- Strikeouts: 21
- Stats at Baseball Reference

Teams
- Seattle Mariners (2019–2020)
Medals
Men's baseball
Representing United States
WBSC Premier12
Bronze medal – third place	2024 Tokyo	Team

Zachary Dylan Grotz (born February 17, 1993) is an American professional baseball pitcher for the Charros de Jalisco of the Mexican League. He has previously played in Major League Baseball (MLB) for the Seattle Mariners. Listed at 6 feet 2 inches (1.88 m) and 195 pounds (88 kg), he throws and bats right-handed.

== Career ==
Grotz attended Burlingame High School in Burlingame, California. He attended Cal State Monterey Bay in 2012, playing college baseball for the Otters. Grotz transferred to the College of San Mateo for the 2013 season. He then transferred to the University of Tennessee and played for the Volunteers in 2014. Grotz transferred to Embry–Riddle Aeronautical University for the 2015 season.

=== Houston Astros ===
Grotz was drafted by the Houston Astros in the 28th round, with the 829th overall selection, of the 2015 Major League Baseball draft. He split the 2015 season between the Rookie league Greeneville Astros and the Low-A Tri-City ValleyCats, registering a combined 5–3 record with a 3.27 earned run average (ERA). Grotz was released by the Astros organization on April 2, 2016.

=== Washington Wild Things ===
On April 12, 2016, Grotz signed with the Washington Wild Things of the independent Frontier League. In 29 appearances with Washington, Grotz recorded a 4–2 record and 1.36 ERA with 51 strikeouts in 46 1/3 innings of work.

=== Los Angeles Dodgers ===
On August 18, 2016, Grotz's contract was sold to the Los Angeles Dodgers organization. He pitched in five games for the rookie-level Ogden Raptors, posting a 4–0 record and 0.50 ERA, but was released on September 18.

=== Bridgeport Bluefish ===
On February 14, 2017, Grotz signed with the Bridgeport Bluefish of the independent Atlantic League of Professional Baseball. In 67 appearances for Bridgeport in 2017, Grotz logged a 4–3 record and 3.77 ERA with 80 strikeouts in 74 innings pitched. He became a free agent after the season.

=== York Revolution ===
On March 1, 2018, Grotz returned to the Atlantic League, signing with the York Revolution. In 7 games with York, Grotz registered a 2–1 record and 2.53 ERA with 33 strikeouts in 32 innings of work.

=== New York Mets ===
On June 15, 2018, Grotz's contract was purchased by the New York Mets organization. He finished the season with the Single-A Columbia Fireflies, pitching to a 3–7 record and 4.61 ERA in 13 appearances. On November 2, he elected free agency.

=== Seattle Mariners ===
On February 21, 2019, Grotz signed a minor league contract with the Seattle Mariners organization. He opened the 2019 season with the Double-A Arkansas Travelers. On July 31, the Mariners selected Grotz's contract and promoted him to the major leagues for the first time. He made his major league debut on August 2 against the Houston Astros, allowing one run over two innings pitched. During the 2019 season, Grotz appeared in 14 games with the Mariners, all in relief, pitching to a 0–1 record with 4.15 ERA and 18 strikeouts in 17 1/3 innings pitched. He also made two appearances in Triple-A with the Tacoma Rainiers of the Pacific Coast League.

During the shortened 2020 season, Grotz appeared in five games with the Mariners, with no decisions and a 14.73 ERA and four strikeouts in 7 1/3 innings pitched. On September 1, 2020, Grotz was outrighted off of the Mariners' 40-man roster. He did not play in a minor league game due to the cancellation of the minor league season because of the COVID-19 pandemic and became a free agent on November 2.

=== Boston Red Sox ===
On January 18, 2021, Grotz signed a minor league contract with the Boston Red Sox. He was assigned to the Triple-A Worcester Red Sox and spent time on the injured list until making his season debut on June 11. In eight appearances (one start) with Worcester, Grotz compiled a 9.58 ERA while striking out seven batters in 10 1/3 innings. He did not pitch after July 10, spending the rest of the season on the injured list. He elected free agency following the season on November 7.

=== Acereros de Monclova ===
On May 27, 2022, Grotz signed with the Acereros de Monclova of the Mexican League. Grotz did not appear in a game for the team during the 2022 season. In 2023, he made 10 appearances (7 starts) and logged a 2–2 record and 4.42 ERA with 29 strikeouts in 38 2/3 innings pitched.

=== Kansas City Monarchs ===
On August 26, 2023, Grotz was loaned to the Kansas City Monarchs of the American Association of Professional Baseball. In two starts for the Monarchs, Grotz posted a strong 0.82 ERA with 12 strikeouts across 11 innings of work.

=== Acereros de Monclova (second stint) ===
On October 12, 2023, following the American Association season, Grotz was returned to the Acereros de Monclova of the Mexican League. He made 14 starts for Monclova in 2024, compiling a 7–1 record, 81 strikeouts, and a league–leading 2.35 ERA across 76 2/3 innings pitched.

=== Diablos Rojos del México ===
On January 17, 2025, Grotz was traded to the Diablos Rojos del México of the Mexican League in exchange for Steven Moyers. In 12 appearances (10 starts) for México, Grotz logged a 3-5 record and 5.34 ERA with 51 strikeouts across 57 1/3 innings pitched.

=== Charros de Jalisco ===
On July 1, 2025, Grotz, Trevor Clifton, and Greg Minier were traded to the Charros de Jalisco of the Mexican League. In 6 starts he threw 27.2 innings going 2-1 with a 5.86 ERA and 29 strikeouts.
