= Austin Nola =

American baseball player (born 1989)

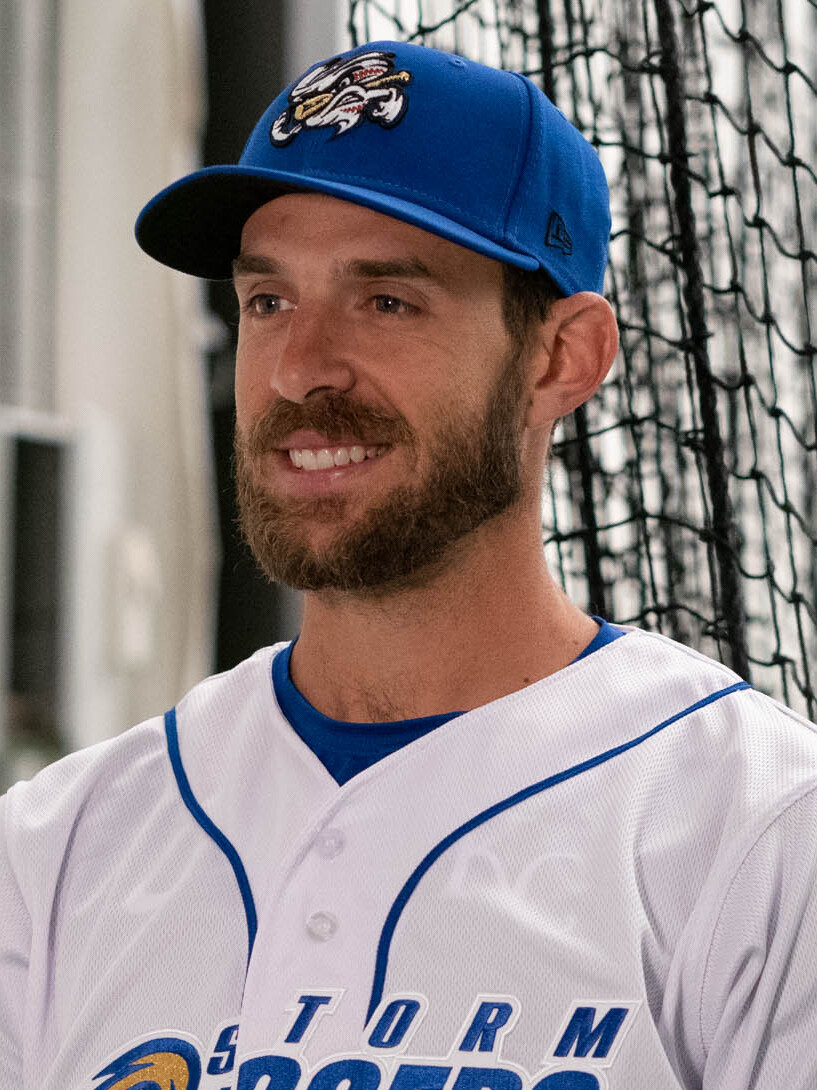
- Nola with the Omaha Storm Chasers in 2024

Seattle Mariners – No. 60
- Catcher / Coach
- Born: December 28, 1989 (age 36); Baton Rouge, Louisiana, U.S.
- Batted: Right Threw: Right

MLB debut
- June 16, 2019, for the Seattle Mariners

Last MLB appearance
- August 11, 2025, for the Colorado Rockies

MLB statistics
- Batting average: .247
- Home runs: 24
- Runs batted in: 137
- Stats at Baseball Reference

Teams
- As player: Seattle Mariners (2019–2020); San Diego Padres (2020–2023); Colorado Rockies (2025); As coach: Seattle Mariners (2026–present)

Austin Kyle Nola (born December 28, 1989) is an American former professional baseball catcher who serves as the bullpen coach for the Seattle Mariners of Major League Baseball (MLB). He played in MLB for the Mariners, San Diego Padres, and Colorado Rockies. He made his MLB debut in 2019.

Nola was born and raised in Baton Rouge, Louisiana, where he and his brother Aaron attended Catholic High School. The Colorado Rockies drafted Nola out of high school in 2008, but he declined their offer, instead playing college baseball for Louisiana State University, where he helped the Tigers win the 2009 College World Series championship. He was drafted after his junior year in 2011, this time by the Toronto Blue Jays, but chose to finish his college career.

The Miami Marlins then selected Nola in the fifth round of the 2012 MLB draft, and he elected to sign with them for a $75,000 signing bonus. He spent the next few seasons rising through the Marlins' farm system, reaching the Triple-A New Orleans Zephyrs in 2015. There, his career stalled, and Nola, worried that he would not make it to the major leagues, made the change from shortstop to catcher. He learned the position while playing in the Arizona Fall League, then began starting behind the plate full-time in 2017. A free agent after the 2018 season, Nola signed a contract with the Mariners. He made his major league debut with Seattle in June 2019. At the 2020 trading deadline, the Mariners traded Nola to the Padres, with whom Nola had his first MLB postseason appearance. He caught the Padres through the 2020 National League Wild Card Series, taking the team to the 2020 National League Division Series (NLCS). He returned to the NLCS in 2022, but the Padres released him during the 2023 season. He briefly returned to the majors in 2025 with Colorado.

== Early life ==
Nola was born on December 28, 1989 in Baton Rouge, Louisiana. His father owns a remodeling and construction company and is a baseball coach, and his mother is a part-time secretary. His younger brother Aaron would become a pitcher for the Philadelphia Phillies of Major League Baseball (MLB). Their maternal grandfather, Richard Barrios, once served as the sergeant at arms for the Louisiana House of Representatives. Nola took to baseball from an early age, often playing catch with his father in their backyard after school. Nola's father coached his and Aaron's baseball teams throughout their childhood.

Nola attended Catholic High School and played shortstop for the school baseball team. He made the varsity team as a freshman and led the team in hitting that year. As a junior in 2007, Nola was part of Catholic's district championship team. During all four years of his high school baseball career, Nola was an all-state shortstop selection. As a senior in 2008, Nola was named the Baton Rouge Advocate's Star of Stars in baseball and Louisiana player of the year by Gatorade and Louisville Slugger. He batted .447 that year with 48 runs scored, 42 runs batted in (RBIs), and 13 home runs.

== College career ==
The Colorado Rockies selected Nola in the 48th round of the 2008 MLB draft, but he chose not to sign, instead committing to play college baseball for Louisiana State University (LSU). Seeking to improve an infield defense that went 40 games without a successful double play in 2009, LSU moved junior DJ LeMahieu to second base and made freshman Nola their starting shortstop. Nola played well at the position and batted .240 with 27 runs, 18 RBIs, and three home runs during the regular season. In the 2009 College World Series, Nola batted .250 with four runs and one home run. He had a perfect 1.000 fielding percentage, making no errors in 24 chances as LSU won its sixth championship.

Returning to LSU as a sophomore in 2010, Nola started all 63 regular-season games at shortstop, batting .320 with 50 runs, 52 RBIs, and five home runs. That year, LSU beat Alabama for their third straight Southeastern Conference (SEC) championship title, and Nola was named the tournament Most Valuable Player (MVP). Later that year, Nola played collegiate summer baseball for the Harwich Mariners of the Cape Cod Baseball League. He returned to LSU as a junior in 2011, starting as the shortstop in all 56 games. On April 10, while playing against Arkansas, Nola hit a grand slam in the sixth inning of an eventual 5–4 defeat. In addition to being the first grand slam of Nola's career, it was the only one by an LSU player during that season.

Nola played for Harwich again during the 2011 season, batting .217 in 39 games with 15 RBIs and 17 runs scored. Both Nola and his younger brother were selected by the Toronto Blue Jays in the 2011 MLB draft, but both brothers chose LSU over signing professionally. Austin returned to finish his senior year, while Aaron was starting as a freshman. He collected his second career grand slam on April 13, 2012, in a 10–2 victory over Alabama. LSU made it through several regional rounds of the NCAA Division I baseball tournament but fell to the Stony Brook Seawolves in their Cinderella run to the College World Series. At the end of his college career, Nola was awarded the Wally Pontiff Academic Achievement Award as the top student-athlete on LSU's baseball team. He batted .299 during his senior season, with four home runs and 43 RBIs in 64 games.

== Professional career ==
=== Miami Marlins (2012–2018) ===
The Miami Marlins selected Nola in the fifth round, 167th overall, of the 2012 MLB draft. He signed with the team shortly thereafter for a $75,000 signing bonus. He was initially assigned to the Low-A Jamestown Jammers of the New York–Penn League, but, after a few weeks there, Nola was promoted to the Single-A Greensboro Grasshoppers of the South Atlantic League. Nola played in 65 games his first professional season, batting .211 with 48 hits, one home run, and 18 RBI. In 2013, Nola played with the Jupiter Hammerheads of the High-A Florida State League. In 489 at bats, he batted .232 with one home run and 40 RBI.

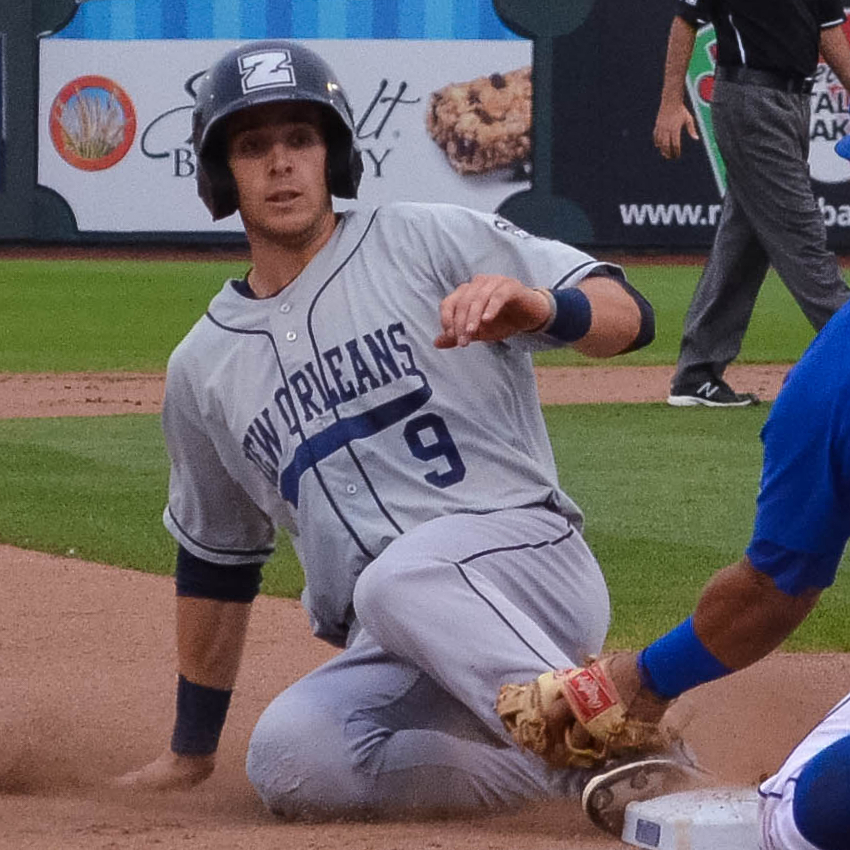
Nola playing for the New Orleans Zephyrs in 2015

In 2014, Nola was assigned to the Double-A Jacksonville Suns of the Southern League. In 134 games as Jacksonville's shortstop, Nola hit .259 with one home run and 53 RBI. He helped take Jacksonville to their sixth Southern League championship, scoring two runs and driving in another in a 6–1 victory over the Chattanooga Lookouts to sweep the final series in three games. After the 2014 minor league season, Nola was assigned to the Salt River Rafters of the Arizona Fall League (AFL), alongside five other Marlins prospects. He played in 13 games for Salt River, batting .298 with six RBIs and nine runs. Although Nola had hoped to begin the 2015 season with the Triple-A New Orleans Zephyrs, the crowded Zephyrs infield meant that he returned to Jacksonville at the start of the year. He was called up to the Zephyrs on June 28, after infielder Miguel Rojas and outfielder Cole Gillespie received major league promotions. Because the Zephyrs wore the abbreviation "NOLA" on the front of their jerseys, short for "New Orleans, Louisiana", Nola's name appeared on both the front and back of his Zephyrs uniform. He played 61 games at Triple A in 2015, batting .280 with 18 RBIs and 18 runs scored.

Nola returned to the Zephyrs in 2016, serving as the starting shortstop and the second batter in the batting order. He also spent time at third base, and practiced at second base to diversify his infield repertoire. Nola batted .261 with six home runs and 44 RBIs in 372 at bats. During the 2016 season, Nola worried that his career was stalling and that he was not on the way to the major leagues. Zephyrs' hitting coach Paul Phillips suggested that Nola transition from shortstop to catcher, and he rejoined the AFL to learn the new position. In eight games with the Mesa Solar Sox, Nola batted .273, with two home runs and five runs scored. That November, the Marlins added Nola to their expanded roster in order to protect him from the Rule 5 draft.

During the 2016–17 offseason, Nola received private instruction from his brother on improving his catching abilities through communication with pitchers. His ability to control the game from behind the plate impressed coaches during spring training, and Nola began the season on the Marlins' 40-man roster for the first time in his career. Nola spent the entire 2017 season behind the plate. He started with the Double-A Jacksonville Jumbo Shrimp, playing 54 games with them before receiving a promotion to New Orleans, now nicknamed the Baby Cakes. Between the two teams, Nola batted .233 in 2017, with three home runs and 31 RBIs. Nola was designated for assignment on March 29, 2018 and was placed on waivers and later outrighted to the Baby Cakes. There, he served as the team's starting catcher and a bottom-of-the-order batter. He played 69 minor league games that season, batting .279 with two home runs and 32 RBIs. Nola became a free agent after the season.

=== Seattle Mariners (2019–2020) ===
Nola signed a minor league contract with the Seattle Mariners on November 9, 2018. He opened the season with the Triple-A Tacoma Rainiers of the Pacific Coast League, who used him as a utility player. In his first 25 games, Nola played 15 at catcher, eight at first base, and two at third base. He was called up to the Mariners on June 16, 2019, and made his major league debut the same day. He started the 6–3 victory over the Oakland Athletics at first base, a position left vacant after the Mariners traded Edwin Encarnacion to the New York Yankees, and recorded his first hit in the third inning of the game. His first major league home run came later that month, a solo shot against Wade Miley of the Houston Astros on June 28. Nola finished the season batting .269 with 10 home runs and 31 RBI in 267 at-bats. He played a variety of positions for the team, spending most of his time at first base, with appearances at second and third base, catcher, and left and right field.

After Tom Murphy broke one of the metatarsal bones in his left foot prior to opening day, Nola was chosen as the Mariners' starting catcher for the 2020 season, which began on July 24, 2020, due to the COVID-19 pandemic. Joe Hudson was named as Nola's backup. In the first month of the season, Nola was a consistently strong hitter for the Mariners, with five home runs, 17 RBI, and nine multi-hit games in his first 25 appearances. He also grew more comfortable behind the plate, telling reporters, "I like getting back there. I learn so much from being back there a lot." In 29 games with the Mariners in 2020, Nola batted .306 with 19 RBI.

=== San Diego Padres (2020–2023) ===
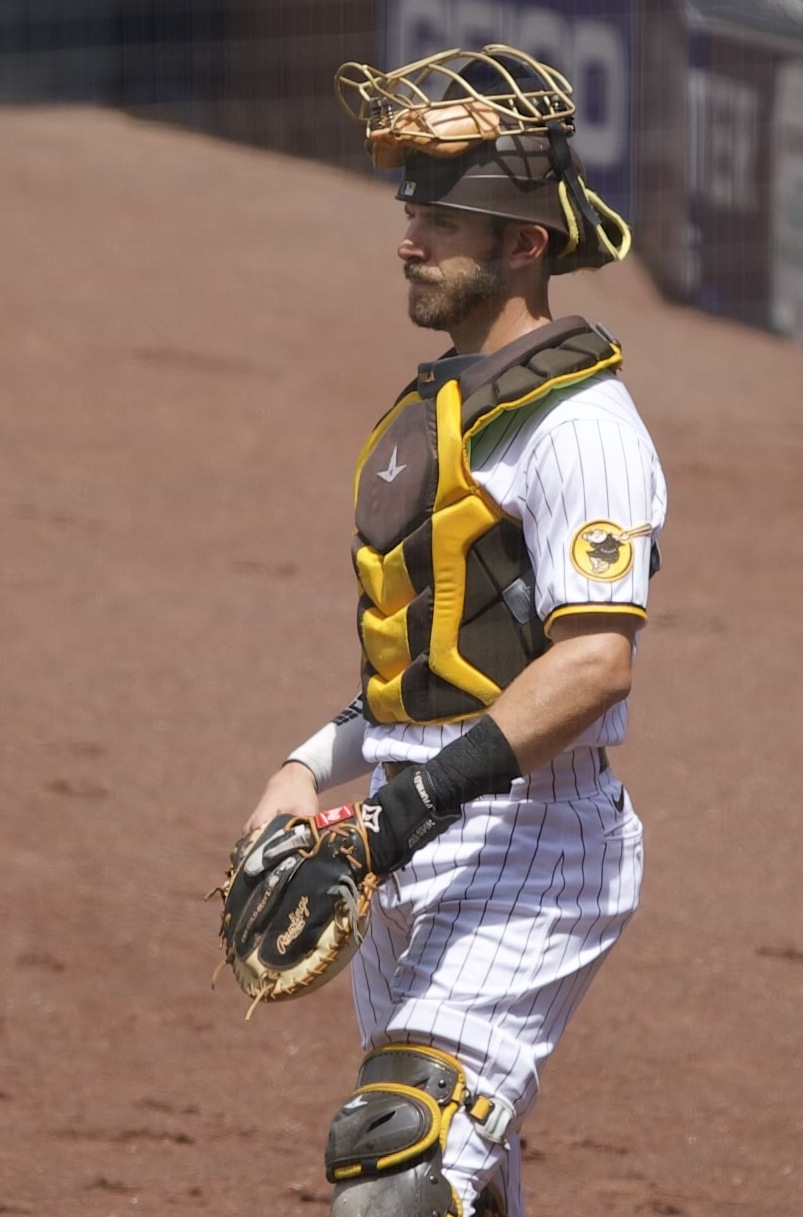
Nola catching for the Padres during the 2021 season

On August 30, 2020, the Mariners traded Nola and relief pitchers Dan Altavilla and Austin Adams to the San Diego Padres in exchange for infielder Ty France, outfielder Taylor Trammell, pitcher Andrés Muñoz, and catcher Luis Torrens. The trade was part of a larger series of deadline moves by Padres general manager A. J. Preller, who aimed to take the team to its first playoff appearance in 14 seasons. That postseason, the Padres appeared in the National League (NL) Wild Card Series, facing the St. Louis Cardinals. In the finale of the three-game series, the Padres played a bullpen game, (Note: The term refers to a contemporary practice in which, rather than a traditional game that utilizes a multi-inning starting pitcher, a series of relievers combine to pitch the entire game.) and Nola became the first MLB catcher to backstop nine pitchers through a postseason shutout, taking the team to the NL Division Series (NLDS). There, the Los Angeles Dodgers swept the Padres in three game. After the season ended, Nola revealed that he had fractured his foot on a foul ball about a week after he joined the Padres, but he had continued playing through the injury. In the 48 games which he caught, pitchers posted a 2.50 earned run average (ERA), the lowest among all team catchers. Nola's hitting cooled after the trade, batting .222 with two home runs and 9 RBI in 19 regular season games with the Padres. In his first postseason, he hit two singles in 17 at bats with three RBI and four walks.

During spring training in 2021, Nola fractured the middle finger of his left hand while attempting to catch a foul tip. He missed the first month of the season, with backup catchers Victor Caratini and Luis Campusano filling in behind the plate until Nola returned on April 27. After playing only 18 games, Nola was sidelined again, this time with a sprained knee. Webster Rivas was called up from Triple-A in Nola's place. Nola began practicing again at the start of July and started behind the plate again on July 28 against the Oakland Athletics. Nola faced his brother for the first time in their respective MLB careers on August 21, when the Padres played the Phillies. Nola struck out swinging on three consecutive fastballs from Aaron. Nola's injury-riddles season came to an end on September 24, when he was shut down to undergo thumb surgery from an injury sustained in a home plate collision with Brandon Belt of the San Francisco Giants. Prior to 2021, Nola had never gone on the injured list in either the minor or the major leagues; that season, his finger, knee, and thumb injuries limited Nola to only 56 games. He batted .272 in the games he did play, with two home runs and 29 RBIs in 173 at bats.

Nola played in a career-high 110 games in 2022, batting .251 with 4 home runs and 40 RBI, also the most of his career. During Game 2 of the NLCS, Austin and Aaron Nola became the first pair of brothers in MLB postseason history to face each other as pitcher and batter. Nola batted .225 with 2 doubles and 5 RBI in 10 games in his second postseason.

On January 13, 2023, Nola agreed to a one-year, $2.35 million contract with the Padres, avoiding salary arbitration. He was hit in the face by a pitch during spring training, breaking his nose. He cleared concussion protocols and was on San Diego's Opening Day roster. After batting .146 in 130 at bats, the Padres optioned Nola to Triple-A El Paso. He batted .185 in eight games before being reexamined for concussion symptoms. Nola was diagnosed with oculomotor dysfunction. He was non-tendered and became a free agent on November 17.

=== Kansas City Royals (2024) ===
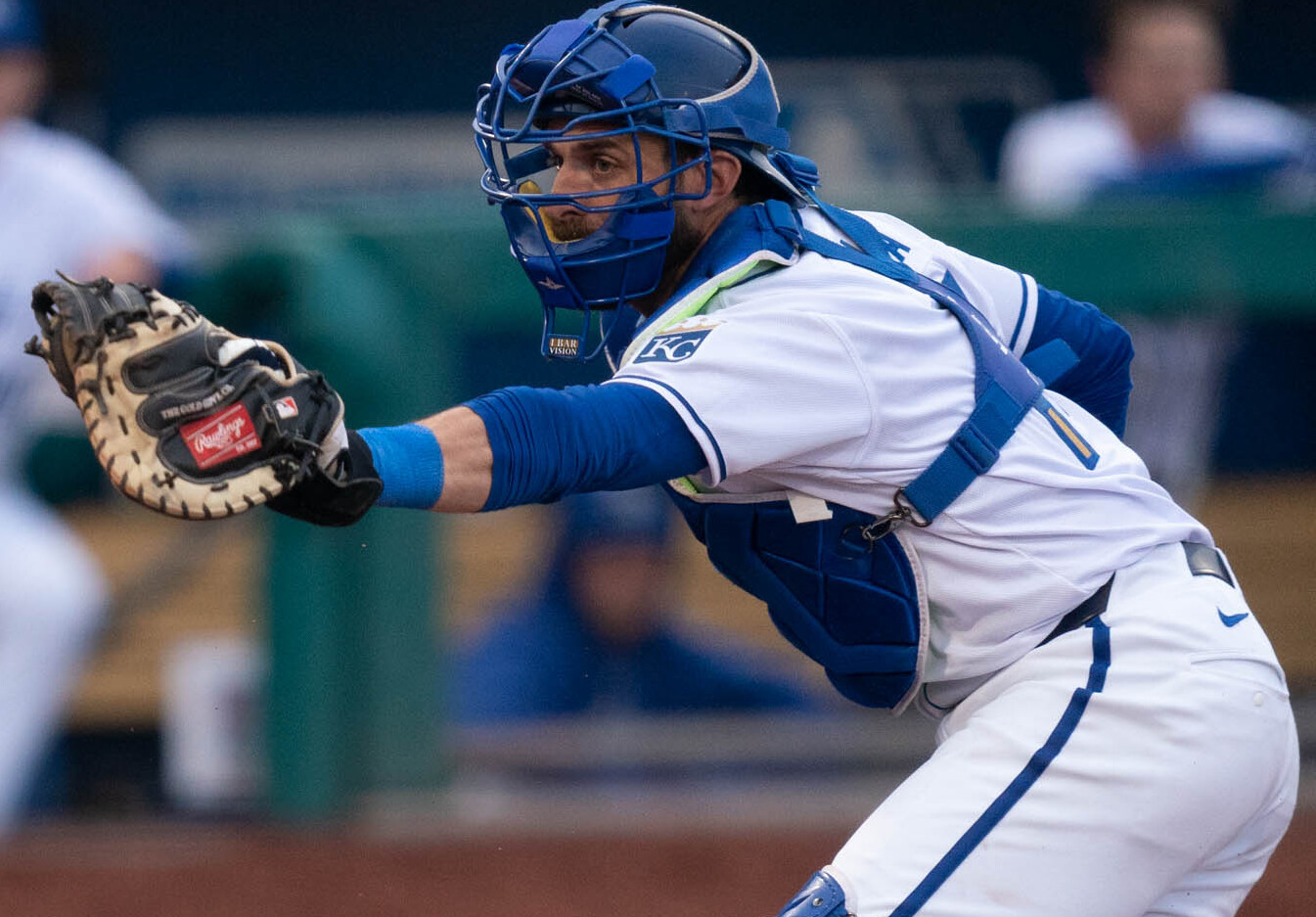
Nola with the Omaha Storm Chasers in 2024

On January 5, 2024, Nola signed a minor league contract with the Milwaukee Brewers organization. However, he was released by the Brewers on February 22 and signed a one-year major league contract with the Kansas City Royals the following day. Nola was optioned to the Triple-A Omaha Storm Chasers to begin the season. On August 31, Nola was designated for assignment by the Royals. He cleared waivers and was sent outright to Omaha on September 3. In 55 games for Omaha, Nola batted .174/.260/.298 with five home runs and 24 RBI.

=== Colorado Rockies (2025) ===
On December 8, 2024, Nola signed a minor league contract with the Colorado Rockies. In 29 appearances split between the rookie-level Arizona Complex League Rockies and Triple-A Albuquerque Isotopes, he batted .330/.397/.456 with one home run and 20 RBI. On July 1, the Rockies added him to their active roster. In 14 appearances for Colorado, he batted .184/.225/.211 with one RBI. Nola was designated for assignment by the Rockies on August 11. He elected free agency after clearing waivers on August 15.

=== Atlanta Braves ===
On October 21, 2025, Nola signed a minor league contract with the Atlanta Braves. He was released on November 11.

== Coaching career ==
The Seattle Mariners hired Nola as their bullpen coach, announcing the move on December 5, 2025.

== Personal life ==
Nola and his wife have one son, who was born on March 26, 2020, which would have been opening day had the 2020 MLB season not been postponed due to the COVID-19 pandemic. Their daughter was born on September 9, 2022.

Nola is of Italian descent; his great-grandparents emigrated to Baton Rouge from Sicily. His brother Aaron Nola currently pitches for the Philadelphia Phillies. Their uncle suffers from amyotrophic lateral sclerosis (ALS), and in January 2020, the Nola brothers hosted a "Strike Out ALS" charity event in Baton Rouge on his behalf.
