= Brandon Brennan =

American baseball player (born 1991)

Algodoneros de Unión Laguna – No. 65
- Pitcher
- Born: July 26, 1991 (age 35); Mission Viejo, California, U.S.
- Bats: Right Throws: Right

MLB debut
- March 21, 2019, for the Seattle Mariners

MLB statistics (through 2021 season)
- Win–loss record: 3–6
- Earned run average: 4.21
- Strikeouts: 55
- Stats at Baseball Reference

Teams
- Seattle Mariners (2019–2020); Boston Red Sox (2021)

Brandon Sean Michael Brennan (born July 26, 1991) is an American professional baseball pitcher for the Algodoneros de Unión Laguna of the Mexican League. He has previously played in Major League Baseball (MLB) for the Seattle Mariners and Boston Red Sox and in the Chinese Professional Baseball League (CPBL) for the Fubon Guardians.

== Amateur career ==
Brennan attended Capistrano Valley High School in Mission Viejo, California. The Colorado Rockies selected Brennan in the 40th round of the 2010 MLB draft, but Brennan did not sign. Brennan attended the University of Oregon as a freshman in 2011, but took a redshirt and did not play for the Oregon Ducks. Brennan chose to transfer from Oregon, but as he did so too late to be eligible for a Division I school, he transferred to Orange Coast College (OCC) for his 2012 sophomore season. In 15 games (14 starts) at OCC in 2012, Brennan had an 11–1 win–loss record with a 1.25 earned run average (ERA).

== Professional career ==
=== Chicago White Sox ===
The Chicago White Sox selected Brennan in the fourth round, with the 141st overall selection, of the 2012 MLB draft. Brennan signed with the White Sox for a $320,800 signing bonus. After signing, he debuted with the Great Falls Voyagers of the Rookie-level Pioneer League, pitching to a 3–2 record with a 4.34 ERA in 37 innings pitched. In 2013, he pitched for the Kannapolis Intimidators of the Single-A South Atlantic League, going 4–9 with a 5.53 ERA in 81 innings. Brennan spent 2014 with Great Falls, Kannapolis, and the Winston-Salem Dash of the High-A Carolina League. He combined to go 5–1 with a 2.91 ERA in 66 innings. He spent 2015 with Winston-Salem, going 3–4 with a 3.55 ERA in 58 innings. On November 20, 2015, the White Sox added Brennan to their 40-man roster to protect him from the Rule 5 draft.

Brennan spent 2016 with Winston-Salem and the Birmingham Barons of the Double-A Southern League, going a combined 3–12 with a 6.79 ERA in 102 innings. On November 19, 2016, he was outrighted off of the 40-man roster. He spent the 2017 season with Birmingham and the Charlotte Knights of the Triple-A International League, going a combined 2–2 with a 4.68 ERA in 59 2/3 innings. In 2018, he again split the season between Birmingham and Charlotte, combining to go 5–4 with a 3.25 ERA in 74 2/3 innings. On November 2, 2018, Brennan elected free agency.

=== Seattle Mariners ===
On November 13, 2018, Brennan signed a minor league contract with the Colorado Rockies organization.

The Seattle Mariners identified Brennan as a player to target when their analytics department identified improvements in Brennan's changeup. At the Winter Meetings in December 2018, they selected Brennan with the 13th pick in the Rule 5 draft. Brennan made the Seattle Mariners's 2019 Opening Day roster. He made his major league debut on March 21, pitching a scoreless eighth inning against the Oakland Athletics. Overall for the Mariners, he was 3–6 with a 4.56 ERA in 44 appearances, striking out 47 batters in 47 1/3 innings pitched. In 2020, Brennan recorded a 3.68 ERA with seven strikeouts in five appearances.

On April 28, 2021, Brennan was designated for assignment following the waiver claim of catcher Jacob Nottingham.

=== Boston Red Sox ===
On May 3, 2021, Brennan was claimed off waivers by the Boston Red Sox and was assigned to the Triple-A Worcester Red Sox. He was called up and added to Boston's active roster on June 10. He pitched three scoreless innings in one appearance for the team, then was designated for assignment on June 13. He was outrighted to Triple-A Worcester on June 16. Brennan made 32 appearances for Triple-A Worcester, going 1–2 with a 5.97 ERA and 37 strikeouts. On September 14, the Red Sox released Brennan.

=== Atlanta Braves ===
On March 10, 2022, Brennan signed a minor league contract with the Atlanta Braves. In 24 appearances for the Triple-A Gwinnett Stripers, he struggled to a 6.91 ERA with 33 strikeouts across 27 1/3 innings pitched. Brennan was released by the Braves organization on July 7.

=== Tecolotes de los Dos Laredos ===
On July 14, 2022, Brennan signed with the Tecolotes de los Dos Laredos of the Mexican League. In 3 games (2 starts) for the team, Brennan went 2-0 with 7 strikeouts in 10 innings, and did not concede a run.

Brennan made 19 starts for Dos Laredos in 2023, with an 11–4 record, 3.69 ERA, and 59 strikeouts across 97 2/3 innings pitched.

=== Fubon Guardians ===
On January 26, 2024, Brennan signed with the Fubon Guardians of the Chinese Professional Baseball League. In 14 starts for Fubon, he had a 2–6 record, 5.34 ERA, and 40 strikeouts across 64 innings pitched. Brennan was released by the Guardians on July 26.

=== Tecolotes de los Dos Laredos (second stint) ===
On February 27, 2025, Brennan signed with the Tecolotes de los Dos Laredos of the Mexican League. In 11 games (10 starts), he posted a 1–4 record with a 6.64 ERA, 27 walks, and 22 strikeouts across 40 2/3 innings pitched.

Brennan made four starts for Dos Laredos in 2026, registering a 1–2 record with a 7.53 ERA, seven walks, and 11 strikeouts over 14 1/3 innings pitched.

=== Leones de Yucatán ===
On May 11, 2026, Brennan was loaned to the Leones de Yucatán of the Mexican League. In nine starts, he went 3–3 with a 3.77 ERA and 34 strikeouts across 45 1/3 innings pitched.

=== Algodoneros de Unión Laguna ===
On July 16, 2026, Brennan was recalled by Dos Laredos, and subsequently traded to the Algodoneros de Unión Laguna of the Mexican League alongside Roenis Elías and Ryan Hendrix.

== See also ==
- Rule 5 draft results
