= Reggie McClain =

American baseball player (born 1992)

- Pitcher
- Born: November 16, 1992 (age 34); Shawnee Mission, Kansas, U.S.
- Batted: Right Threw: Right

MLB debut
- August 2, 2019, for the Seattle Mariners

Last MLB appearance
- August 30, 2020, for the Philadelphia Phillies

MLB statistics
- Win–loss record: 1–1
- Earned run average: 5.81
- Strikeouts: 13
- Stats at Baseball Reference

Teams
- Seattle Mariners (2019); Philadelphia Phillies (2020)

Reginald Kristen McClain (born November 16, 1992) is an American former professional baseball pitcher. He played in Major League Baseball (MLB) for the Seattle Mariners and Philadelphia Phillies.

== Amateur career ==
McClain attended Northview High School in Johns Creek, Georgia. He missed most of his senior season of baseball with a shoulder injury. He then attended the University of Georgia his freshman season but was redshirted and did not play on the baseball team. He transferred to State College of Florida, Manatee–Sarasota, where he played college baseball for two seasons. He transferred to the University of Missouri and played two seasons for the Tigers. He was a control pitcher, with a 94-to-9 strikeout-to-walk ratio his final collegiate season.

== Professional career ==
=== Seattle Mariners ===
==== Draft and minor leagues (2016–2019) ====
The Seattle Mariners selected McClain in the 13th round, with the 387th overall selection of the 2016 MLB draft. He signed for a $5,000 signing bonus. He played for the Everett AquaSox in 2016, pitching to a 3–3 win–loss record with a 4.47 earned run average (ERA) in 48 innings pitched. He spent 2017 with the Modesto Nuts, going 12–9 with a 4.75 ERA in 153 innings. He was a California League All-Star and led Mariners minor league pitchers in wins and innings pitched. He returned to Modesto for the 2018 season, going 6–11 with a 5.01 ERA in 133 innings. In the 2019 season, McClain has split time between Modesto, the Arkansas Travelers, and the Tacoma Rainiers before his promotion to the majors.

==== Major leagues (2019) ====
On August 2, 2019, the Mariners selected McClain's contract and promoted him to the major leagues. He made his major league debut that night against the Houston Astros, recording two strikeouts while allowing three runs in one inning of relief. He pitched to a 1–1 record and a 6.00 ERA in 21 innings. McClain was designated for assignment by the Mariners on January 24, 2020.

=== Philadelphia Phillies ===
On January 31, 2020, McClain was claimed off waivers by the Philadelphia Phillies. He pitched in five games for the Phillies in 2020, with a 5.06 ERA over 5 1/3 innings. He was designated for assignment by the Phillies on August 31 and outrighted on September 3.

=== New York Yankees ===
On December 10, 2020, the New York Yankees selected McClain from the Phillies in the minor league phase of the Rule 5 draft. The Yankees invited McClain to spring training in 2021 as a non-roster player. The Yankees assigned him to the Scranton/Wilkes-Barre RailRiders. On July 21, McClain combined with Luis Gil and Stephen Ridings to throw a no-hitter. He had a 5–2 record and 1.79 ERA in his first season with Scranton.

McClain made 17 appearances for Scranton in 2022, struggling to an 0–1 record and 7.56 ERA with 16 strikeouts across 16 2/3 innings of work. He elected free agency following the season on November 10.

== See also ==
- Rule 5 draft results
