= Paul Davis (baseball) =

American baseball coach (born 1964)

- Coach
- Born: May 12, 1964 (age 62); Orlando, Florida, U.S.

Teams
- As coach: Seattle Mariners (2019)

Paul A. Davis (born May 12, 1964) is a baseball coach who was pitching coach the Seattle Mariners of Major League Baseball (MLB) during the 2019 season. He also worked in the minor leagues for the St. Louis Cardinals and Atlanta Braves.

== Baseball career ==
Davis played high school baseball at Osceola High School in Kissimmee, Florida, graduating in 1981, and college baseball at Valencia Community College and for the Creighton Bluejays.

Davis was head coach at Dana College from 1995 to 1999, where he was twice named Nebraska-Iowa Athletic Conference coach of the year. He coached the Omaha Indians, a collegiate summer baseball team, in 1998. He also worked as a scout for the Philadelphia Phillies and New York Mets.

Davis joined the Cardinals organization in late 2012, working as the pitching coach for the Johnson City Cardinals in 2013 and 2014, rehab pitching pitching coach in 2015, then assistant minor league pitching coordinator in 2016 and 2017, then manager of pitching analytics in 2018. Fellow pitching coach Brent Strom was a mentor in the St. Louis organization.

Davis replaced Mel Stottlemyre Jr. as Seattle's pitching coach. During Davis's season with the Mariners as a major league coach, the team had the eighth-highest earned run average in MLB, second-fewest strikeouts, and allowed the fourth-most home runs. He was succeeded as pitching coach by Pete Woodworth.

After his year with the Mariners, Davis joined Atlanta in January 2020, working first as a pitching coordinator, then as the director of pitching development. He helped the organization develop pitchers, including Spencer Strider. He left the organization after the 2025 season.

== Personal life ==
Davis and his wife have two children.

Outside baseball, Davis taught collegiately, working as an adjunct professor at the University of Nebraska, Iowa Western Community College, and Nebraska Wesleyan University, all from 2005 to 2011. He has bachelor's degrees from Creighton and Peru State College and a master's degree from Nebraska.
