= 2019 Tampa Bay Rays season =

2019 Tampa Bay Rays
- American League Wild Card winners
- League: American League
- Division: East
- Ballpark: Tropicana Field
- City: St. Petersburg, Florida
- Record: 96–66 (.593)
- Divisional place: 2nd
- Owners: Stuart Sternberg
- Managers: Kevin Cash
- Television: Fox Sports Sun; Fox Sports Florida (Dewayne Staats, Kevin Burkhardt, Brian Anderson)
- Radio: Tampa Bay Rays Radio Network (English) (Andy Freed, Dave Wills); WGES (Spanish) (Ricardo Taveras, Enrique Oliu)

The 2019 Tampa Bay Rays season was the Rays' 22nd season of Major League Baseball, and the 12th as the "Rays" (all at Tropicana Field). The Rays clinched a spot in the playoffs for the first time since 2013 and defeated the Oakland Athletics in the ALWC Game 5–1. They then lost in the ALDS to the Houston Astros 3–2.

== American League East ==
AL East
Team	W	L	Pct.	GB	Home	Road
New York Yankees	103	59	.636	—	57‍–‍24	46‍–‍35
Tampa Bay Rays	96	66	.593	7	48‍–‍33	48‍–‍33
Boston Red Sox	84	78	.519	19	38‍–‍43	46‍–‍35
Toronto Blue Jays	67	95	.414	36	35‍–‍46	32‍–‍49
Baltimore Orioles	54	108	.333	49	25‍–‍56	29‍–‍52

== American League Wild Card ==
Division leaders
Team	W	L	Pct.
Houston Astros	107	55	.660
New York Yankees	103	59	.636
Minnesota Twins	101	61	.623

Wild Card teams (Top 2 teams qualify for postseason)
Team	W	L	Pct.	GB
Oakland Athletics	97	65	.599	+1
Tampa Bay Rays	96	66	.593	—
Cleveland Indians	93	69	.574	3
Boston Red Sox	84	78	.519	12
Texas Rangers	78	84	.481	18
Chicago White Sox	72	89	.447	23½
Los Angeles Angels	72	90	.444	24
Seattle Mariners	68	94	.420	28
Toronto Blue Jays	67	95	.414	29
Kansas City Royals	59	103	.364	37
Baltimore Orioles	54	108	.333	42
Detroit Tigers	47	114	.292	48½

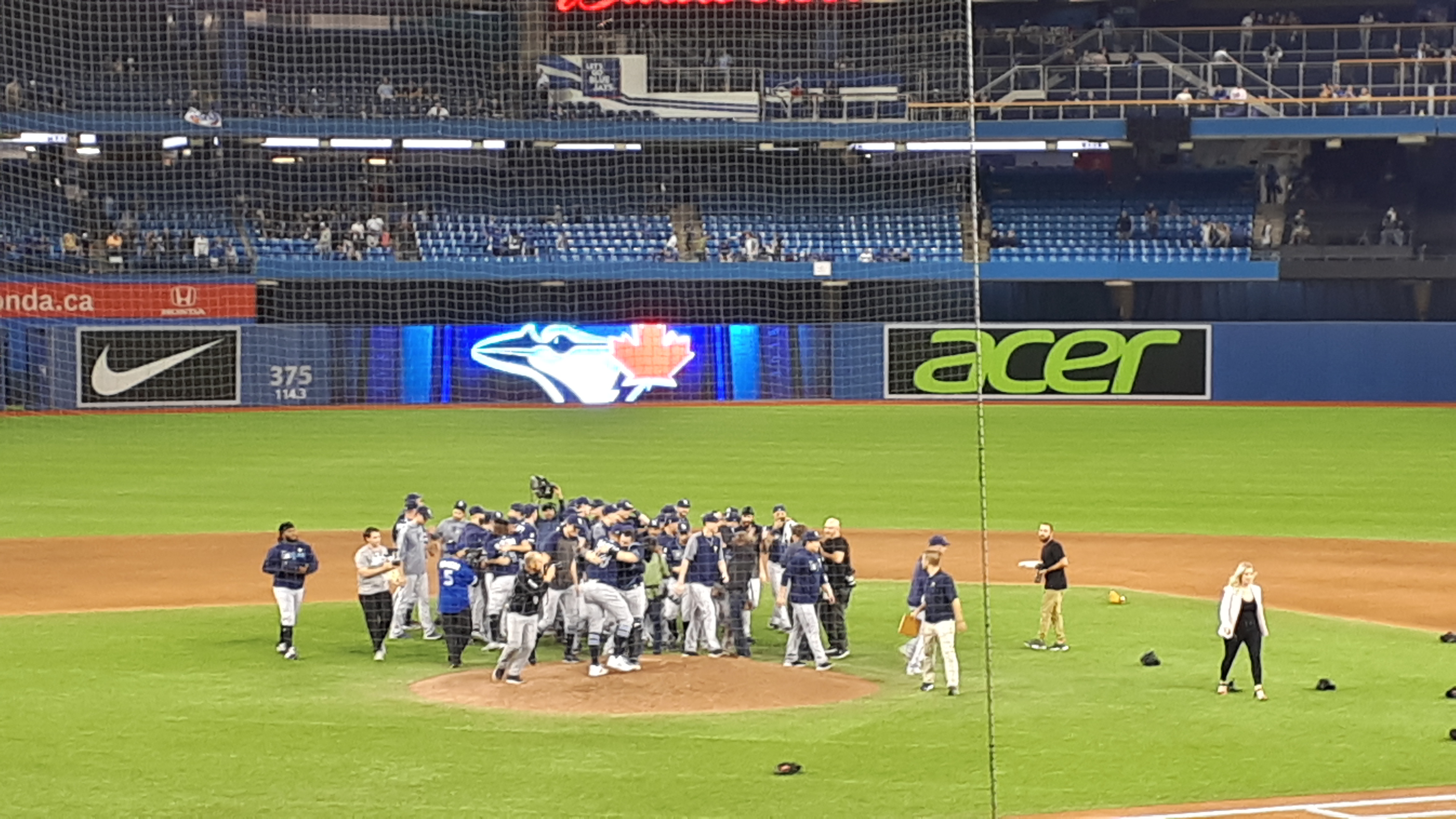
Rays celebrate on the field in Toronto after winning a wild card spot, September 27th.

== Record against opponents ==
2019 American League record Source: MLB Standings Grid – 2019
Team	BAL	BOS	CWS	CLE	DET	HOU	KC	LAA	MIN	NYY	OAK	SEA	TB	TEX	TOR	NL
Baltimore	—	7–12	3–3	3–4	3–4	2–4	3–3	4–3	0–6	2–17	1–6	3–4	7–12	1–6	8–11	7–13
Boston	12–7	—	5–2	3–3	5–2	2–4	5–1	4–3	3–3	5–14	4–3	4–3	7–12	4–3	11–8	10–10
Chicago	3–3	2–5	—	11–8	12–6	4–3	9–10	2–5	6–13	4–3	1–5	2–4	2–4	4–3	4–3	6–14
Cleveland	4–3	3–3	8–11	—	18–1	3–4	12–7	6–0	10–9	4–3	1–5	5–1	1–6	4–3	6–1	8–12
Detroit	4–3	2–5	6–12	1–18	—	1–6	10–9	3–3	5–14	3–3	1–6	1–6	2–4	0–6	3–4	5–15
Houston	4–2	4–2	3–4	4–3	6–1	—	5–1	14–5	3–4	4–3	11–8	18–1	3–4	13–6	4–2	11–9
Kansas City	3–3	1–5	10–9	7–12	9–10	1–5	—	2–4	5–14	2–5	2–5	2–5	3–4	2–5	1–6	9–11
Los Angeles	3–4	3–4	5–2	0–6	3–3	5–14	4–2	—	1–5	2–5	6–13	10–9	3–4	9–10	6–1	12–8
Minnesota	6–0	3–3	13–6	9–10	14–5	4–3	14–5	5–1	—	2–4	3–4	5–2	5–2	6–1	4–3	8–12
New York	17–2	14–5	3–4	3–4	3–3	3–4	5–2	5–2	4–2	—	2–4	6–1	12–7	3–3	11–8	12–8
Oakland	6–1	3–4	5–1	5–1	6–1	8–11	5–2	13–6	4–3	4–2	—	10–9	4–3	13–6	0–6	11–9
Seattle	4–3	3–4	4–2	1–5	6–1	1–18	5–2	9–10	2–5	1–6	9–10	—	2–4	8–11	4–2	9–11
Tampa Bay	12–7	12–7	4–2	6–1	4–2	4–3	4–3	4–3	2–5	7–12	3–4	4–2	—	3–3	13–6	14–6
Texas	6–1	3–4	3–4	3–4	6–0	6–13	5–2	10–9	1–6	3–3	6–13	11–8	3–3	—	3–3	9–11
Toronto	11–8	8–11	3–4	1–6	4–3	2–4	6–1	1–6	3–4	8–11	6–0	2–4	6–13	3–3	—	3–17

== Game log ==
=== Regular season ===
2019 Regular Season Game Log: 96–66 (Home: 48–33; Away: 48–33)
March/April: 19–9 (Home: 9–7; Away: 10–2)

#	Date	Opponent	Score	Win	Loss	Save	Attendance	Record	Streak/Recap
1	March 28	Astros	1–5	Verlander (1–0)	**Snell** (0–1)	—	25,025	0–1	L1
2	March 29	Astros	4–2	**Morton** (1–0)	Cole (0–1)	**Alvarado** (1)	13,059	1–1	W1
3	March 30	Astros	3–1	**Glasnow** (1–0)	McHugh (0–1)	**Alvarado** (2)	16,010	2–1	W2
4	March 31	Astros	3–1	**Chirinos** (1–0)	Miley (0–1)	**Castillo** (1)	18,473	3–1	W3
5	April 1	Rockies	7–1	**Yarbrough** (1–0)	Bettis (0–1)	—	10,860	4–1	W4
6	April 2	Rockies	4–0	**Snell** (1–1)	Freeland (1–1)	—	10,933	5–1	W5
7	April 3	Rockies	0–1 (11)	Davis (1–0)	**Roe** (0–1)	—	11,093	5–2	L1
8	April 5	@ Giants	5–2	**Glasnow** (2–0)	Rodríguez (1–1)	**Alvarado** (3)	41,067	6–2	W1
9	April 6	@ Giants	4–6	Bergen (1–0)	**Yarbrough** (1–1)	Smith (3)	31,828	6–3	L1
10	April 7	@ Giants	3–0	**Chirinos** (2–0)	Pomeranz (0–1)	**Alvarado** (4)	31,574	7–3	W1
11	April 8	@ White Sox	5–1	**Snell** (2–1)	Rodón (1–2)	**Wood** (1)	11,734	8–3	W2
12	April 9	@ White Sox	10–5	**Morton** (2–0)	Santana (0–1)	—	10,799	9–3	W3
13	April 10	@ White Sox	9–1	**Glasnow** (3–0)	López (0–2)	**Beeks** (1)	11,107	10–3	W4
14	April 12	@ Blue Jays	11–7	**Yarbrough** (2–1)	Thornton (0–1)	—	17,326	11–3	W5
15	April 13	@ Blue Jays	1–3	Pannone (1–2)	**Roe** (0–2)	Giles (4)	20,771	11–4	L1
16	April 14	@ Blue Jays	8–4	**Kolarek** (1–0)	Stroman (0–3)	—	20,512	12–4	W1
17	April 16	Orioles	4–2	**Glasnow** (4–0)	Bundy (0–2)	**Castillo** (2)	9,842	13–4	W2
18	April 17	Orioles	8–1	**Chirinos** (3–0)	Hess (1–3)	—	9,028	14–4	W3
19	April 18	Orioles	5–6 (11)	Means (2–2)	**Castillo** (0–1)	—	9,081	14–5	L1
20	April 19	Red Sox	4–6	Workman (1–1)	**Castillo** (0–2)	Brasier (4)	21,343	14–6	L2
21	April 20	Red Sox	5–6	Barnes (2–0)	**Alvarado** (0–1)	Brasier (5)	22,940	14–7	L3
22	April 21	Red Sox	3–4 (11)	Walden (3–0)	**Alvarado** (0–2)	Brasier (6)	18,740	14–8	L4
23	April 22	Royals	6–3	**Font** (1–0)	Keller (2–2)	**Pagán** (1)	9,914	15–8	W1
24	April 23	Royals	5–2	**Beeks** (1–0)	Bailey (2–2)	**Pagán** (2)	8,298	16–8	W2
25	April 24	Royals	2–10	Junis (2–2)	**Snell** (2–2)	—	9,502	16–9	L1
—	April 26	@ Red Sox	Postponed (rain); Makeup: June 8						
26	April 27	@ Red Sox	2–1	**Morton** (3–0)	Price (1–2)	**Pagán** (3)	34,733	17–9	W1
27	April 28	@ Red Sox	5–2	**Glasnow** (5–0)	Sale (0–5)	**Castillo** (3)	33,823	18–9	W2
28	April 29	@ Royals	8–5	**Chirinos** (4–0)	Keller (2–3)	—	11,744	19–9	W3
—	April 30	@ Royals	Postponed (rain); Makeup: May 1						

May: 16–11 (Home: 8–5; Away: 8–6)

#	Date	Opponent	Score	Win	Loss	Save	Attendance	Record	Streak/Recap
29	May 1 (1)	@ Royals	2–3	Junis (3–2)	**Stanek** (0–1)	Ian Kennedy (2)	11,141	19–10	L1
30	May 1 (2)	@ Royals	2–8	Sparkman (1–1)	**Snell** (2–3)	—	11,141	19–11	L2
31	May 2	@ Royals	3–1	**Kolarek** (2–0)	Peralta (2–2)	**Castillo** (4)	23,343	20–11	W1
32	May 3	@ Orioles	7–0	**Glasnow** (6–0)	Straily (1–2)	—	10,034	21–11	W2
33	May 4	@ Orioles	0–3	Bundy (1–4)	**Chirinos** (4–1)	Givens (3)	15,241	21–12	L1
–	May 5	@ Orioles	Postponed (rain); Makeup: July 13						
34	May 6	Diamondbacks	12–1	**Snell** (3–3)	Kelly (3–3)	—	8,124	22–12	W1
35	May 7	Diamondbacks	6–3	**Beeks** (2–0)	Clarke (0–1)	—	8,059	23–12	W2
36	May 8	Diamondbacks	2–3 (13)	Bradley (2–3)	**Kolarek** (2–1)	Godley (1)	8,663	23–13	L1
37	May 10	Yankees	3–4	Germán (7–1)	**Glasnow** (6–1)	Chapman (9)	20,846	23–14	L2
38	May 11	Yankees	7–2	**Chirinos** (5–1)	Holder (2–1)	—	25,025	24–14	W1
39	May 12	Yankees	1–7	Tanaka (3–3)	**Snell** (3–4)	—	25,025	24–15	L1
40	May 14	@ Marlins	4–0	**Morton** (4–0)	Smith (3–1)	—	6,306	25–15	W1
41	May 15	@ Marlins	1–0	**Beeks** (3–0)	Ureña (1–6)	**Castillo** (5)	5,947	26–15	W2
42	May 17	@ Yankees	3–4	Holder (3–1)	**Alvarado** (0–3)	—	41,281	26–16	L1
43	May 18	@ Yankees	2–1 (11)	**Wood** (1–0)	Cessa (0–1)	**Alvarado** (5)	43,079	27–16	W1
44	May 19	@ Yankees	5–13	Ottavino (2–1)	**Castillo** (0–3)	Adams (1)	43,032	27–17	L1
45	May 21	Dodgers	3–7	Kershaw (4–0)	**Wood** (1–1)	—	15,682	27–18	L2
46	May 22	Dodgers	8–1	**Pagán** (1–0)	Floro (1–1)	—	12,826	28–18	W1
47	May 23	@ Indians	7–2	**Yarbrough** (3–1)	Plutko (1–1)	—	18,884	29–18	W2
48	May 24	@ Indians	1–3	Cole (2–1)	**Alvarado** (0–4)	Brad Hand (13)	24,084	29–19	L1
49	May 25	@ Indians	6–2	**Morton** (5–0)	Carrasco (4–5)	—	25,882	30–19	W1
50	May 26	@ Indians	6–3	**Beeks** (4–0)	Bauer (4–4)	**Alvarado** (6)	20,288	31–19	W2
51	May 27	Blue Jays	8–3	**Chirinos** (5–2)	Sanchez (3–5)	—	15,883	32–19	W3
52	May 28	Blue Jays	3–1	**Yarbrough** (4–1)	Richard (0–1)	**Castillo** (6)	5,786	33–19	W4
53	May 29	Blue Jays	4–3 (11)	**Castillo** (1–3)	Shafer (0–1)	—	6,166	34–19	W5
54	May 30	Twins	14–3	**Morton** (6–0)	Pérez (7–2)		8,076	35–19	W6
55	May 31	Twins	3–5	Rogers (2–1)	**Castillo** (1–4)	—	14,375	35–20	L1

June: 13–16 (Home: 5–7; Away: 8–9)

#	Date	Opponent	Score	Win	Loss	Save	Attendance	Record	Streak/Recap
56	June 1	Twins	2–6	Gibson (6–2)	**Chirinos** (6–2)	—	14,381	35–21	L2
57	June 2	Twins	7–9	Odorizzi (8–2)	**Yarbrough** (4–2)	Rogers (5)	14,616	35–22	L3
58	June 4	@ Tigers	6–9	Carpenter (1–2)	**Snell** (3–5)	Greene (19)	15,420	35–23	L4
59	June 5	@ Tigers	4–0	**Morton** (7–0)	Turnbull (3–5)	—	14,272	36–23	W1
60	June 6	@ Tigers	6–1	**Beeks** (5–0)	Norris (2–5)	—	21,442	37–23	W2
61	June 7	@ Red Sox	5–1	**Chirinos** (7–2)	Porcello (4–6)	—	36,803	38–23	W3
62	June 8 (1)	@ Red Sox	9–2	**Yarbrough** (5–2)	Smith (0–2)	—	35,564	39–23	W4
63	June 8 (2)	@ Red Sox	1–5	Price (4–2)	**Poche** (0–1)	—	37,048	39–24	L1
64	June 9	@ Red Sox	6–1	**Snell** (4–5)	Rodríguez (6–4)	—	34,643	40–24	W1
65	June 10	Athletics	6–2	**Morton** (8–0)	Anderson (0–1)	—	16,091	41–24	W2
66	June 11	Athletics	3–4	Fiers (6–3)	**Pagán** (1–1)	Treinen (15)	11,132	41–25	L1
67	June 12	Athletics	2–6	Hendriks (3–0)	**Kolarek** (2–2)	—	17,946	41–26	L2
68	June 13	Angels	3–5	Skaggs (5–6)	**Yarbrough** (5–3)	Bedrosian (1)	15,291	41–27	L3
69	June 14	Angels	9–4	**Pagán** (2–1)	Buttrey (4–3)	—	21,598	42–27	W1
70	June 15	Angels	3–5	Suárez (2–1)	**Morton** (8–1)	Robles (10)	22,320	42–28	L1
71	June 16	Angels	6–5	**Poche** (1–1)	Canning (2–3)	**Castillo** (7)	20,508	43–28	W1
72	June 17	@ Yankees	0–3	Tanaka (5–5)	**Chirinos** (7–3)	—	39,042	43–29	L1
73	June 18	@ Yankees	3–6	Happ (7–3)	**Roe** (0–3)	Chapman (19)	40,479	43–30	L2
74	June 19	@ Yankees	1–12	Sabathia (4–4)	**Snell** (4–6)	—	41,144	43–31	L3
75	June 20	@ Athletics	4–5	Trivino (3–5)	**Castillo** (1–5)	—	12,351	43–32	L4
76	June 21	@ Athletics	5–3	**Pruitt** (1–0)	Anderson (0–2)	**Pagán** (4)	16,126	44–32	W1
77	June 22	@ Athletics	2–4	Petit (2–1)	**Castillo** (1–6)	Liam Hendriks (1)	26,623	44–33	L1
78	June 23	@ Athletics	8–2	**Yarbrough** (6–3)	Anderson (7–5)	—	17,006	45–33	W1
79	June 25	@ Twins	4–9	Gibson (8–4)	**Snell** (4–7)	—	31,963	45–34	L1
80	June 26	@ Twins	4–6	May (3–1)	**Morton** (8–2)	Rogers (10)	31,650	45–35	L2
81	June 27	@ Twins	5–2 (18)	**Yarbrough** (7–3)	Harper (3–1)	—	31,317	46–35	W1
82	June 28	Rangers	0–5	Lynn (10–3)	**Chirinos** (7–4)	—	13,955	46–36	L1
83	June 29	Rangers	5–2	**McKay** (1–0)	Sampson (6–5)	—	16,655	47–36	W1
84	June 30	Rangers	6–2	**Snell** (5–7)	Chavez (3–3)	—	11,234	48–36	W2

July: 14–12 (Home: 6–7; Away: 8–5)

#	Date	Opponent	Score	Win	Loss	Save	Attendance	Record	Streak/Recap
85	July 1	Orioles	6–3	**Kolarek** (3–2)	Kline (1–4)	**Alvarado** (7)	20,441	49–36	W3
86	July 2	Orioles	6–3	**Morton** (9–2)	Wojciechowski (0–1)	—	20,925	50–36	W4
87	July 3	Orioles	6–9	Givens (1–4)	**Alvarado** (0–5)	Armstrong (2)	21,545	50–37	L1
88	July 4	Yankees	4–8 (10)	Chapman (2–1)	**Drake** (0–1)	Hale (2)	21,974	50–38	L2
89	July 5	Yankees	4–8 (11)	Hale (2–0)	**Stanek** (0–2)	Chapman (24)	22,182	50–39	L3
90	July 6	Yankees	4–3	**Poche** (2–1)	Green (2–3)	—	21,477	51–39	W1
91	July 7	Yankees	2–1	**Morton** (10–2)	Paxton (5–4)	**Pagán** (5)	20,091	52–39	W2
**90th All-Star Game in Cleveland**
92	July 12	@ Orioles	16–4	**Chirinos** (8–4)	Bundy (4–11)	—	22,422	53–39	W3
93	July 13 (1)	@ Orioles	1–2	Bleier (1–0)	**Poche** (2–2)	Givens (7)	22,596	53–40	L1
94	July 13 (2)	@ Orioles	12–4	**Morton** (11–2)	Means (7–5)	—	24,810	54–40	W1
95	July 14	@ Orioles	4–1	**Yarbrough** (8–3)	Eshelman (0–1)	**Pagán** (6)	14,082	55–40	W2
96	July 15	@ Yankees	5–4	**Kittredge** (1–0)	Chapman (2–2)	**Drake** (1)	43,173	56–40	W3
97	July 16	@ Yankees	3–8	Hale (3–0)	**Poche** (2–3)	—	40,401	56–41	L1
–	July 17	@ Yankees	Postponed (rain); Makeup: July 18						
98	July 18 (1)	@ Yankees	2–6	Germán (12–2)	**Chirinos** (8–5)	—	40,504	56–42	L2
99	July 18 (2)	@ Yankees	1–5	Cessa (1–1)	**Morton** (11–3)	—	40,504	56–43	L3
100	July 19	White Sox	2–9	López (5–8)	**McKay** (1–1)	—	16,971	56–44	L4
101	July 20	White Sox	1–2 (11)	Fry (2–4)	**Kolarek** (3–3)	Colomé (21)	16,388	56–45	L5
102	July 21	White Sox	4–2	**Snell** (6–7)	Cease (1–2)	**Kolarek** (1)	14,987	57–45	W1
103	July 22	Red Sox	4–9	Rodríguez (12–4)	**Beeks** (5–1)	—	10,966	57–46	L1
104	July 23	Red Sox	4–5	Sale (5–9)	**Poche** (2–4)	Walden (2)	15,876	57–47	L2
105	July 24	Red Sox	3–2	**Morton** (12–3)	Price (7–4)	**Pagán** (7)	24,161	58–47	W1
106	July 26	@ Blue Jays	3–1	**Yarbrough** (9–3)	Waguespack (1–1)	**Poche** (1)	22,767	59–47	W2
107	July 27	@ Blue Jays	9–10 (12)	Hudson (6–2)	**Pagán** (2–2)	—	28,204	59–48	L1
108	July 28	@ Blue Jays	10–9	**Roe** (1–3)	Hudson (6–3)	**Castillo** (8)	24,542	60–48	W1
109	July 30	@ Red Sox	6–5	**Kolarek** (4–3)	Taylor (0–1)	**Pagán** (8)	36,412	61–48	W2
110	July 31	@ Red Sox	8–5	**Yarbrough** (10–3)	Porcello (9–8)	**Roe** (1)	33,046	62–48	W3

August: 17–10 (Home: 8–5; Away: 9–5)

#	Date	Opponent	Score	Win	Loss	Save	Attendance	Record	Streak/Recap
111	August 1	@ Red Sox	9–4	**McKay** (2–1)	Cashner (10–6)	—	37,255	63–48	W4
112	August 3	Marlins	8–6	**Anderson** (3–4)	García (1–2)	**Pagán** (9)	14,092	64–48	W5
113	August 4	Marlins	7–2	**Chirinos** (9–5)	Smith (7–5)	—	14,819	65–48	W6
114	August 5	Blue Jays	0–2	Waguespack (3–1)	**Morton** (12–4)	Law (2)	11,948	65–49	L1
115	August 6	Blue Jays	7–6 (10)	**Castillo** (2–6)	Boshers (0–2)	—	9,434	66–49	W1
116	August 7	Blue Jays	3–4	Stewart (1–0)	**McKay** (2–2)	Giles (15)	10,299	66–50	L1
117	August 9	@ Mariners	5–3	**Drake** (1–1)	Bass (1–4)	**Pagán** (10)	26,774	67–50	W1
118	August 10	@ Mariners	5–4	**Morton** (13–4)	Milone (1–7)	**Pagán** (11)	33,895	68–50	W2
119	August 11	@ Mariners	1–0	**Yarbrough** (11–3)	LeBlanc (6–6)	**Pagán** (12)	24,219	69–50	W3
120	August 12	@ Padres	10–4	**Pruitt** (2–0)	Lucchesi (7–7)	—	21,301	70–50	W4
121	August 13	@ Padres	7–5	**Anderson** (4–4)	Báez (0–1)	**Pagán** (13)	25,261	71–50	W5
122	August 14	@ Padres	2–7	Quantrill (6–6)	**Beeks** (5–2)	—	22,886	71–51	L1
123	August 16	Tigers	0–2	VerHagen (3–2)	**Morton** (13–5)	Jiménez (3)	13,717	71–52	L2
124	August 17	Tigers	1–0 (13)	**Poche** (3–4)	Hall (0–1)	—	17,228	72–52	W1
125	August 18	Tigers	5–4	**Alvarado** (1–5)	Jiménez (3–7)	—	16,634	73–52	W2
126	August 19	Mariners	3–9	Gonzales (13–10)	**McKay** (2–3)	—	9,152	73–53	L1
127	August 20	Mariners	4–7	Milone (3–7)	**Beeks** (5–3)	Magill (2)	7,455	73–54	L2
128	August 21	Mariners	7–6	**Pagán** (3–2)	Magill (3–1)	—	7,827	74–54	W1
129	August 22	@ Orioles	5–2	**Drake** (2–1)	Castro (1–2)	**Pagán** (14)	8,153	75–54	W2
130	August 23	@ Orioles	7–1	**Richards** (4–12)	Blach (0–2)	**Slegers** (1)	14,762	76–54	W3
131	August 24	@ Orioles	1–7	Means (9–9)	**Alvarado** (1–6)	—	11,409	76–55	L1
132	August 25	@ Orioles	3–8	Bundy (6–13)	**Castillo** (2–7)	—	13,287	76–56	L2
133	August 27	@ Astros	1–15	Verlander (16–5)	**Morton** (13–6)	—	28,454	76–57	L3
134	August 28	@ Astros	6–8	Harris (4–1)	**Castillo** (2–8)	—	25,539	76–58	L4
135	August 29	@ Astros	9–8	**De León** (1–0)	Devenski (2–3)	**Pagán** (15)	33,051	77–58	W1
136	August 30	Indians	4–0	**Drake** (3–1)	Bieber (12–7)	—	15,294	78–58	W2
137	August 31	Indians	9–6	**Beeks** (6–3)	Plesac (7–5)	**Pagán** (16)	13,327	79–58	W3

September: 17–8 (Home: 12–2; Away: 5–6)

#	Date	Opponent	Score	Win	Loss	Save	Attendance	Record	Streak/Recap
138	September 1	Indians	8–2	**Morton** (14–6)	Plutko (6–4)	—	14,922	80–58	W4
139	September 2	Orioles	5–4 (10)	**Poche** (4–4)	Tate (0–1)	—	10,566	81–58	W5
140	September 3 (1)	Orioles	2–4	Blach (1–2)	**Drake** (3–2)	Bleier (3)	6,844	81–59	L1
141	September 3 (2)	Orioles	2–0	**Beeks** (7–3)	Ynoa (1–8)	**Pagán** (17)	6,844	82–59	W1
–	September 4	Orioles	Rescheduled to September 3 due to Hurricane Dorian						
142	September 5	Blue Jays	6–4	**Drake** (4–2)	Boshers (0–3)	**Pagán** (18)	5,962	83–59	W2
143	September 6	Blue Jays	5–0	**Fairbanks** (1–2)	Buchholz (1–4)	**Pagán** (19)	10,853	84–59	W3
144	September 7	Blue Jays	5–3	**Anderson** (5–4)	Romano (0–2)	**Drake** (2)	12,663	85–59	W4
145	September 8	Blue Jays	8–3	**Richards** (5–12)	Waguespack (4–4)	—	14,071	86–59	W5
146	September 10	@ Rangers	5–3 (11)	**Pagán** (4–2)	Clase (2–3)	**Fairbanks** (1)	18,467	87–59	W6
147	September 11	@ Rangers	9–10	Gibaut (1–0)	**Poche** (4–5)	Leclerc (12)	19,746	87–60	L1
148	September 12	@ Rangers	4–6	Farrell (1–0)	**McKay** (2–4)	Leclerc (13)	18,222	87–61	L2
149	September 13	@ Angels	11–4	**Morton** (15–6)	Heaney (4–5)	—	39,914	88–61	W1
150	September 14	@ Angels	3–1	**Richards** (6–12)	Barría (4–9)	**Pagán** (20)	39,056	89–61	W2
151	September 15	@ Angels	4–6	Ramirez (5–3)	**Yarbrough** (11–4)	Robles (21)	36,709	89–62	L1
152	September 17	@ Dodgers	5–7	Maeda (10–8)	**Fairbanks** (1–3)	Jansen (30)	48,663	89–63	L2
153	September 18	@ Dodgers	8–7 (11)	**Poche** (5–5)	Sborz (0–1)	**Fairbanks** (2)	48,253	90–63	W1
154	September 20	Red Sox	5–4 (11)	**Castillo** (4–8)	Kelley (0–3)	—	17,117	91–63	W2
155	September 21	Red Sox	5–4 (11)	**Castillo** (5–8)	Smith (0–3)	—	18,179	92–63	W3
156	September 22	Red Sox	4–7	Eovaldi (2–0)	**Yarbrough** (11–5)	—	17,946	92–64	L1
157	September 23	Red Sox	7–4	**Pruitt** (3–0)	Poyner (0–1)	**Poche** (2)	8,779	93–64	W1
158	September 24	Yankees	2–1 (12)	**Fairbanks** (2–3)	Gearrin (1–3)	—	16,699	94–64	W2
159	September 25	Yankees	4–0	**Morton** (16–6)	Loáisiga (2–2)	—	20,390	95–64	W3
160	September 27	@ Blue Jays	6–2	**Drake** (5–2)	Zeuch (1–2)	—	16,348	96–64	W4
161	September 28	@ Blue Jays	1–4	Thornton (6–9)	**Yarbrough** (11–6)	Giles (23)	20,293	96–65	L1
162	September 29	@ Blue Jays	3–8	Buchholz (2–5)	**Snell** (6–8)	—	25,738	96–66	L2

Legend: = Win = Loss = Postponement
Bold = Rays team member

== Player stats ==
Note: Team leaders in each category are noted in bold.

=== Batting ===
Note: G = Games played; AB = At bats; R = Runs; H = Hits; 2B = Doubles; 3B = Triples; HR = Home runs; RBI = Runs batted in; SB = Stolen bases; BB = Walks; AVG = Batting average; SLG = Slugging average

Player	G	AB	R	H	2B	3B	HR	RBI	SB	BB	AVG	SLG
Tommy Pham	145	**567**	77	**155**	**33**	2	21	68	**25**	**81**	.273	.450
Willy Adames	**152**	531	69	135	25	1	20	52	4	46	.254	.418
Austin Meadows	138	530	**83**	154	29	**7**	**33**	**89**	12	54	**.291**	**.558**
Avisaíl García	125	489	61	138	25	2	20	72	10	31	.282	.464
Kevin Kiermaier	129	447	60	102	20	**7**	14	55	19	26	.228	.398
Ji-man Choi	127	410	54	107	20	2	19	63	2	64	.261	.459
Travis d'Arnaud	92	327	50	86	16	0	16	67	0	30	.263	.459
Yandy Díaz	79	307	53	82	20	1	14	38	2	35	.267	.476
Brandon Lowe	82	296	42	80	17	2	17	51	5	25	.270	.514
Mike Zunino	90	266	30	44	10	1	9	32	0	20	.165	.312
Joey Wendle	75	238	32	55	13	2	3	19	8	14	.231	.340
Daniel Robertson	74	207	23	44	9	1	2	19	2	24	.213	.295
Guillermo Heredia	89	204	31	46	13	0	5	20	2	18	.225	.363
Nathaniel Lowe	50	152	24	40	8	0	7	19	0	13	.263	.454
Matt Duffy	46	147	12	37	8	0	1	12	0	19	..252	.327
Mike Brosseau	50	132	17	36	7	0	6	16	1	7	.273	.462
Eric Sogard	37	109	14	29	6	0	3	10	2	9	.266	.404
Jesus Aguilar	37	92	13	24	3	0	4	16	0	12	.261	.424
Christian Arroyo	16	50	8	11	2	0	2	7	0	5	.220	.380
Michael Pérez	22	46	6	10	5	0	0	2	0	8	.217	.326
Erik Kratz	6	17	0	1	0	0	0	0	0	0	.059	.059
Kean Wong	6	14	1	3	0	0	0	0	0	0	.214	.214
Andrew Velazquez	10	12	2	1	1	0	0	0	0	0	.083	.167
Nick Ciuffo	3	6	0	1	0	0	0	0	0	0	.167	.167
Anthony Bemboom	3	5	0	2	1	0	0	1	0	0	.400	.600
Johnny Davis	8	4	5	1	0	1	0	0	0	0	.250	.750
Pitcher totals	162	23	2	3	0	0	1	2	0	1	.130	.261
**Team totals**	**162**	**5628**	**769**	**1427**	**291**	**29**	**217**	**730**	**94**	**542**	**.254**	**.431**

=== Pitching ===
Note: W = Wins; L = Losses; ERA = Earned run average; G = Games pitched; GS = Games started; SV = Saves; IP = Innings pitched; H = Hits allowed; R = Runs allowed; ER = Earned runs allowed; BB = Walks allowed; SO = Strikeouts

Player	W	L	ERA	G	GS	SV	IP	H	R	ER	BB	SO
Charlie Morton	**16**	6	**3.05**	33	**33**	0	**194.2**	**154**	**71**	**66**	**57**	**240**
Ryan Yarbrough	11	6	4.13	28	14	0	141.2	121	69	65	20	117
Yonny Chirinos	9	5	3.85	26	18	0	133.1	112	61	57	28	114
Blake Snell	6	**8**	4.29	23	23	0	107.0	96	53	51	40	147
Jalen Beeks	6	3	4.31	33	3	1	104.1	115	56	50	40	89
Emilio Pagán	4	2	2.31	**66**	0	**20**	70.0	45	19	18	13	96
Diego Castillo	5	8	3.41	65	6	8	68.2	59	32	26	26	81
Tyler Glasnow	6	1	1.78	12	12	0	60.2	40	13	12	14	76
Oliver Drake	5	2	3.21	50	0	2	56.0	36	20	20	19	70
Ryne Stanek	0	2	3.40	41	27	0	55.2	44	24	21	20	61
Colin Poche	5	5	4.70	51	0	2	51.2	33	27	27	19	72
Chaz Roe	1	3	4.06	71	0	1	51.0	49	27	23	31	65
Andrew Kittredge	1	0	4.17	37	7	0	49.2	51	25	23	12	58
Brendan McKay	2	4	5.14	13	11	0	49.0	53	32	28	16	56
Austin Pruitt	3	0	4.40	14	2	0	47.0	47	23	23	12	39
Adam Kolarek	4	3	3.95	54	0	1	43.1	39	19	19	14	36
José Alvarado	1	6	4.80	35	1	7	30.0	29	18	16	27	39
Hunter Wood	1	1	2.48	19	2	1	29.0	26	11	8	7	24
Trevor Richards	3	0	1.93	7	3	0	23.1	23	7	5	5	24
Nick Anderson	3	0	2.11	23	0	0	21.1	12	5	5	2	41
Casey Sadler	0	0	1.86	9	0	0	19.1	16	5	4	5	11
Wilmer Font	1	0	5.79	10	0	0	14.0	15	9	9	5	18
Pete Fairbanks	2	1	5.11	13	0	2	12.1	17	10	7	3	13
Jake Faria	0	0	2.70	7	0	0	10.0	10	3	3	7	11
Cole Sulser	0	0	0.00	7	0	0	7.1	5	0	0	3	9
Anthony Banda	0	0	6.75	3	0	0	4.0	6	3	3	0	2
Mike Brosseau	0	0	4.50	3	0	0	4.0	5	2	2	0	0
José De León	1	0	2.25	3	0	0	4.0	3	2	1	3	7
Hoby Milner	0	0	7.36	4	0	0	3.2	4	3	3	1	3
Aaron Slegers	0	0	3.00	1	0	0	3.0	3	1	1	0	0
Ricardo Pinto	0	0	15.43	2	0	0	2.1	4	4	4	2	0
Ian Gibaut	0	0	9.00	1	0	0	2.0	1	2	2	2	2
Daniel Robertson	0	0	0.00	1	0	0	1.0	1	0	0	0	0
**Team totals**	**96**	**66**	**3.65**	**162**	**162**	**46**	**1474.1**	**1274**	**656**	**598**	**453**	**1621**

=== Postseason ===
2019 Postseason Game Log
American League Wild Card Game

Date	Opponent	Score	Win	Loss	Save	Location/Attendance	Series	Recap
October 2	@ Athletics	5–1	**Morton** (1–0)	Manaea (0–1)	—	RingCentral Coliseum; 54,005	1–0	W1

American League Division Series

#	Date	Opponent	Score	Win	Loss	Save	Location/Attendance	Series
1	October 4	@ Astros	2–6	Verlander (1–0)	**Glasnow** (0–1)	—	Minute Maid Park; 43,360	0–1
2	October 5	@ Astros	1–3	Cole (1–0)	**Snell** (0–1)	Harris (1)	Minute Maid Park; 43,378	0–2
3	October 7	Astros	10–3	**Morton** (2–0)	Greinke (0–1)	—	Tropicana Field; 32,251	1–2
4	October 8	Astros	4–1	**Yarbrough** (1–0)	Verlander (1–1)	**Snell** (1)	Tropicana Field; 32,178	2–2
5	October 10	@ Astros	1–6	Cole (2–0)	**Glasnow** (0–2)	—	Minute Maid Park; 43,418	2–3

== Postseason rosters ==
Playoff rosters
American League Wild Card Game

- Pitchers: 4 Blake Snell 15 Emilio Pagán 20 Tyler Glasnow 38 Colin Poche 47 Oliver Drake 48 Ryan Yarbrough 50 Charlie Morton 52 Chaz Roe 63 Diego Castillo 70 Nick Anderson
- Catchers: 10 Mike Zunino 37 Travis d'Arnaud
- Infielders: 1 Willy Adames 2 Yandy Díaz 5 Matt Duffy 8 Brandon Lowe 18 Joey Wendle 21 Jesús Aguilar 26 Ji-man Choi 28 Daniel Robertson 43 Mike Brosseau
- Outfielders: 17 Austin Meadows 24 Avisaíl García 29 Tommy Pham 39 Kevin Kiermaier

American League Division Series

- Pitchers: 4 Blake Snell 15 Emilio Pagán 20 Tyler Glasnow 38 Colin Poche 47 Oliver Drake 48 Ryan Yarbrough 49 Brendan McKay 50 Charlie Morton 52 Chaz Roe 63 Diego Castillo 70 Nick Anderson 72 Yonny Chirinos
- Catchers: 10 Mike Zunino 37 Travis d'Arnaud
- Infielders: 1 Willy Adames 2 Yandy Díaz 5 Matt Duffy 8 Brandon Lowe 9 Eric Sogard 18 Joey Wendle 26 Ji-man Choi
- Outfielders: 17 Austin Meadows 24 Avisaíl García 29 Tommy Pham 39 Kevin Kiermaier

== Roster ==
2019 Tampa Bay Rays
Roster
Pitchers: 46 José Alvarado; 70 Nick Anderson; 53 Anthony Banda; 68 Jalen Beeks; 63 Diego Castillo; 72 Yonny Chirinos; 87 José De León; 47 Oliver Drake; 44 Peter Fairbanks; 34 Jake Faria; 62 Wilmer Font; 58 Ian Gibaut; 20 Tyler Glasnow; 36 Andrew Kittredge; 56 Adam Kolarek; 49 Brendan McKay; 60 Hoby Milner; 50 Charlie Morton; 15 Emilio Pagán; 67 Ricardo Pinto; 38 Colin Poche; 45 Austin Pruitt; 34 Trevor Richards; 52 Chaz Roe; 65 Casey Sadler; 57 Aaron Slegers; 4 Blake Snell; 55 Ryne Stanek; 71 Cole Sulser; 44 Hunter Wood; 48 Ryan Yarbrough	Catchers: 40 Anthony Bemboom; 19 Nick Ciuffo; 37 Travis d'Arnaud; 6 Erik Kratz; 7 Michael Pérez; 10 Mike Zunino; Infielders: 1 Willy Adames; 21 Jesús Aguilar; 22 Christian Arroyo; 43 Mike Brosseau; 26 Ji-man Choi; 2 Yandy Díaz; 5 Matt Duffy; 8 Brandon Lowe; 35 Nate Lowe; 28 Daniel Robertson; 9 Eric Sogard; 11 Andrew Velazquez; 18 Joey Wendle; 31 Kean Wong	Outfielders: 73 Johnny Davis; 24 Avisaíl García; 54 Guillermo Heredia; 39 Kevin Kiermaier; 17 Austin Meadows; 29 Tommy Pham	Manager: 16 Kevin Cash; Coaches: 98 Mayo Acosta (bullpen catcher); 41 Stan Boroski (bullpen); 99 Misha Dworken (bullpen catcher); 97 Jonathan Erlichman (analytics coach); 25 Paul Hoover (field coordinator); 27 Rodney Linares (third base); 51 Chad Mottola (hitting); 33 Matt Quatraro (bench); 23 Kyle Snyder (pitching); 30 Ozzie Timmons (first base)

== Farm system ==
Level	Team	League	Manager
AAA	Durham Bulls	International League	Brady Williams
AA	Montgomery Biscuits	Southern League	Morgan Ensberg
A-Advanced	Charlotte Stone Crabs	Florida State League	Jeff Smith
A	Bowling Green Hot Rods	Midwest League	Reinaldo Ruiz
A-Short Season	Hudson Valley Renegades	New York–Penn League	Blake Butera
Rookie Advanced	Princeton Rays	Appalachian League	Danny Sheaffer
Rookie	GCL Rays	Gulf Coast League	Rafael Valenzuela
Foreign Rookie	DSL Rays 1	Dominican Summer League	Esteban Gonzalez
Foreign Rookie	DSL Rays 2	Dominican Summer League	Julio Zorrilla

== Major League Baseball draft ==
The 2019 Major League Baseball (MLB) First-Year Player Draft began on Monday, June 3, 2019, and ended June 5. The draft assigned amateur baseball players to MLB teams.

2019 Tampa Bay Rays complete draft list

Round	Pick	Name	Pos	School	Date sgnd.
1	22	Greg Jones	SS	UNC Wilmington	TBA
CBA	36	J.J. Goss	P	Cypress Ranch HS	TBA
CBA	40	Seth Johnson	P	Campbell University	TBA
2	61	John Doxakis	P	Texas A&M	TBA
3	99	Shane Sasaki	CF	Iolani HS	TBA
4	128	Graeme Stinson	P	Duke	TBA
5	158	Ben Brecht	P	UC Santa Barbara	TBA
6	188	Colby White	P	Mississippi State	TBA
7	218	Jake Guenther	1B	TCU	TBA
8	248	Nathen Wiles	P	Oklahoma	TBA
9	278	Evan McKendry	P	Miami	TBA
10	308	Johnathan Embry	C	Liberty University	TBA
11	338	Ben Troike	SS	Unisersity of Illinois	TBA
12	368	Nick Sogard	SS	Loyola Marymount University	TBA
13	398	Zach Huffins	CF	Arizona Western College	TBA
14	428	Logan Allen	OF	U Arkansas FT Smith	TBA
15	458	Brett Wisley	2B	Hulf Coast CC	TBA
16	488	Joe Gobillot	P	Vanderbilt	TBA
17	518	Trevor Brigden	P	Okanahan College	TBA
20	608	Cam Shepherd	SS	Georgia	TBA
21	638	Andrew Petters	P	John A. Logan College	TBA
22	668	Ben Peoples	P	Giles County HS	TBA
23	698	Jayden Murray	P	Dixie State	TBA
24	728	Duke Kinamon	SS	Stanford	TBA
25	758	Garret Hiott	CF	Eckerd College	TBA
26	788	Robbie Peto	P	Stetson University	TBA
27	818	Mitchel Parker	P	San Jacinto College North	TBA
28	848	Hill Alexander	RF	Lubbock Christian	TBA
29	878	Zach Bravo	P	Butler County CC	TBA
30	908	Michael Carpentier	C	Yucaipa HS	TBA
31	938	Brannon Jordan	P	Cowley County CC	TBA
32	968	Kody Huff	C	Horizon HS	TBA
33	998	Carson Coleman	P	Kentucky	TBA
34	1,028	Carter Bach	P	Wake Forest	TBA
35	1,058	Mitchel Walters	P	Wichita State	TBA
36	1,088	Shay Smiddy	P	Louisville	TBA
37	1,118	Addison Moss	P	Rice	TBA
38	1,148	Angelo Armenta	SS	San Diego State	TBA
39	1,178	Andrew Gross	P	University of Texas Arlington	TBA
40	1,208	Luis Trevion	C	Abilene Christian	TBA
