= Boog Powell (outfielder) =

American baseball player (born 1993)

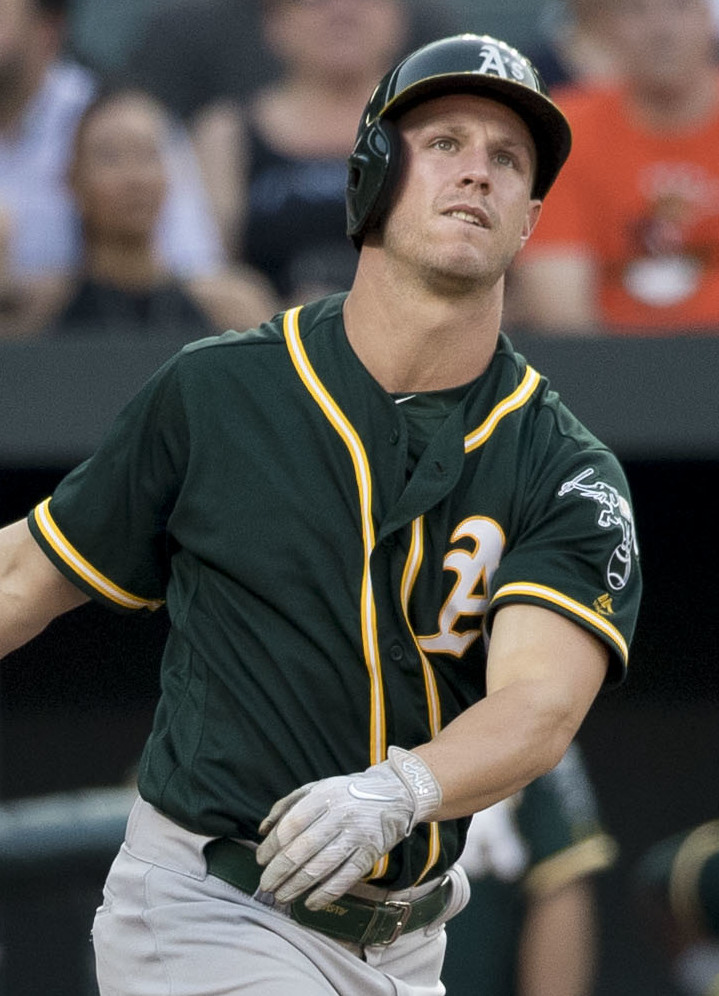
- Powell with the Oakland Athletics in 2017
- Outfielder
- Born: January 14, 1993 (age 33); Irvine, California, U.S.
- Batted: Left Threw: Left

MLB debut
- April 29, 2017, for the Seattle Mariners

Last MLB appearance
- April 6, 2018, for the Oakland Athletics

MLB statistics
- Batting average: .262
- Home runs: 3
- Runs batted in: 12
- Stats at Baseball Reference

Teams
- Seattle Mariners (2017); Oakland Athletics (2017–2018)

Herschel Mack "Boog" Powell IV (born January 14, 1993) is an American former professional baseball outfielder. He played in Major League Baseball (MLB) for the Seattle Mariners and Oakland Athletics.

== Career ==
Powell attended Mission Viejo High School in Mission Viejo, California, and Orange Coast College.

=== Oakland Athletics ===
The Oakland Athletics selected Powell in the 20th round of the 2012 Major League Baseball draft. He made his professional debut that season with the Arizona League Athletics. in 2013 he played for the Vermont Lake Monsters. Powell started 2014 with the Beloit Snappers. In June he was named the MVP of the Midwest League All-Star Game. He was later promoted to the Stockton Ports. In July, Powell was suspended 50 games after testing positive for an amphetamine.

=== Tampa Bay Rays ===
On January 10, 2015, the Athletics traded Powell, John Jaso, and Daniel Robertson to the Tampa Bay Rays for Ben Zobrist and Yunel Escobar. He attended major league spring training in 2015.

=== Seattle Mariners ===
On November 5, 2015, the Rays traded Powell, Nate Karns, and C. J. Riefenhauser to the Seattle Mariners for Brad Miller, Logan Morrison, and Danny Farquhar. The Mariners added him to their 40-man roster after the season. On June 23, 2016, Powell accepted an 80-game suspension for a second positive test for banned substances. The Mariners promoted him to the major leagues on April 29, 2017, and he made his major league debut against the Cleveland Indians on that day.

=== Oakland Athletics (second stint) ===
On August 6, 2017, the Mariners traded Powell back to the Oakland Athletics for Yonder Alonso.

Powell was removed from the 40–man roster and sent outright to Triple-A on September 1, 2018. He elected free agency following the season on November 2.

=== San Diego Padres ===
On January 24, 2019, Powell signed a minor league contract with the San Diego Padres organization. In 105 games for the Triple–A El Paso Chihuahuas, he batted .288/.391/.438 with eight home runs, 37 RBI, and 14 stolen bases. Powell elected free agency following the season on November 4.

=== Cincinnati Reds ===
On January 10, 2020, Powell signed a minor league deal with the Cincinnati Reds. He did not play in a game in 2020 due to the cancellation of the minor league season because of the COVID-19 pandemic. On September 7, Powell was released by the Reds organization.

=== Gastonia Honey Hunters ===
On March 23, 2021, Powell signed with the Gastonia Honey Hunters of the Atlantic League of Professional Baseball. Powell played in 100 games for Gastonia, hitting .342/.440/.539 with 10 home runs and 52 RBI.

=== Long Island Ducks ===
On October 9, 2021, Powell was traded to the Long Island Ducks. Powell collected 3 hits in 8 at-bats across 2 contests for the Ducks. He became a free agent following the season.

=== Lexington Legends ===
On April 4, 2022, Powell signed with the Lexington Legends of the Atlantic League of Professional Baseball. He was released on September 1, 2022. In 70 games he hit .312/.415/.486 with 9 home runs, 32 RBIs and 19 stolen bases.

=== Long Island Ducks (second stint) ===
On April 3, 2023, Powell signed with the Long Island Ducks of the Atlantic League of Professional Baseball. In 67 games for the Ducks, he batted .285/.378/.410 with 6 home runs, 35 RBI, and 18 stolen bases.

=== Milwaukee Milkmen ===
On December 19, 2023, Powell signed with the Milwaukee Milkmen of the American Association of Professional Baseball.

On April 19, 2024, Powell announced his retirement from playing in an Instagram post.

== Personal life ==
Powell is nicknamed "Boog" after the former Baltimore Orioles first baseman and 1970 AL MVP Boog Powell, with whom he shares no relation. His father gave him the nickname as a child in order to avoid confusion, since Powell shares a name with his father, grandfather and great-grandfather.
