= Willy Adames =

Dominican baseball player (born 1995)

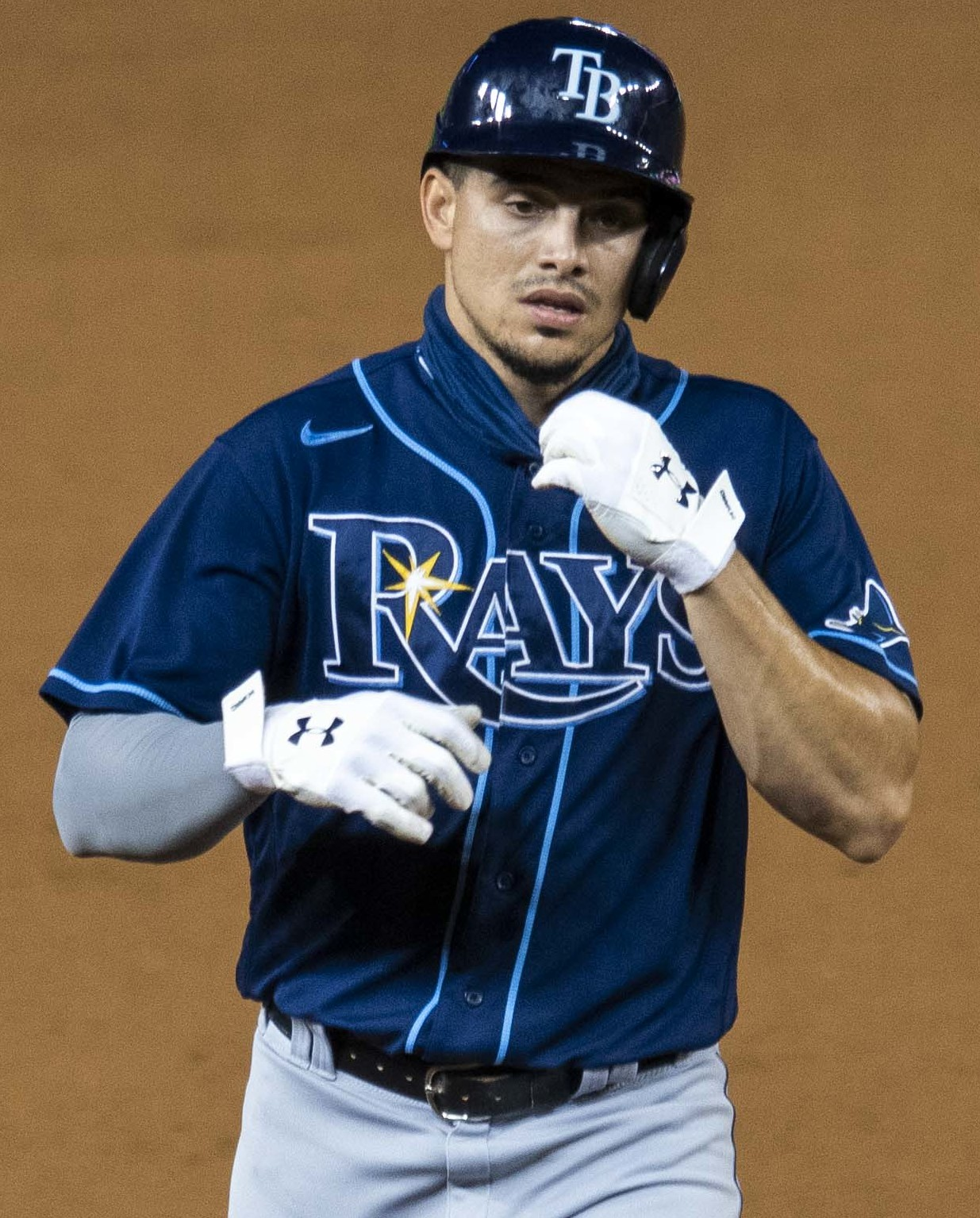
- Adames with the Tampa Bay Rays in 2020

San Francisco Giants – No. 2
- Shortstop
- Born: September 2, 1995 (age 31); Santiago, Santiago, Dominican Republic
- Bats: Right Throws: Right

MLB debut
- May 22, 2018, for the Tampa Bay Rays

MLB statistics (through 2026 season)
- Batting average: .243
- Home runs: 201
- Runs batted in: 610
- Stats at Baseball Reference

Teams
- Tampa Bay Rays (2018–2021); Milwaukee Brewers (2021–2024); San Francisco Giants (2025–present)

Willy Rafael Luna Adames (born September 2, 1995) is a Dominican professional baseball shortstop for the San Francisco Giants of Major League Baseball (MLB). He has previously played in MLB for the Tampa Bay Rays and Milwaukee Brewers. Adames made his MLB debut with the Rays in 2018, and he remained with the team until they traded him to the Brewers during the 2021 season. After the 2024 season, Adames signed a free agent contract with the Giants.

== Career ==
=== Detroit Tigers ===
Adames signed with the Detroit Tigers as an international free agent in July 2012. He made his professional debut in 2013 with the Dominican Summer League Tigers. In 60 games, he hit .245/.419/.370 with one home run. Adames started the 2014 season with the West Michigan Whitecaps.

=== Tampa Bay Rays ===
On July 31, 2014, Adames was involved in a three team trade that sent Adames, Drew Smyly, and Nick Franklin to the Tampa Bay Rays, Austin Jackson to the Seattle Mariners, and David Price to the Detroit Tigers. The Rays assigned him to the Bowling Green Hot Rods, where he finished the season. In 125 combined games between West Michigan and Bowling Green, he batted .271 with eight home runs and 61 RBIs. He played 2015 with the Charlotte Stone Crabs where he posted a .258 batting average with four home runs and 46 RBIs, 2016 with the Montgomery Biscuits where he batted .274 with 11 home runs, 57 RBIs and 31 doubles. In 2016 Adames was selected to the World Team in the All-Star Futures Game. The Rays added Adames to their 40-man roster after the 2016 season. In 2017, Adames played with the Durham Bulls, where he batted .277 with 10 home runs, 62 RBIs and a .776 OPS. In 2018 with Durham, Adames hit .286 with 4 home runs and a .765 OPS in 64 games.

According to MLB.com Adames was ranked as the number one prospect in the Tampa Bay Rays farm system in 2015, 2016, and 2017, the number two prospect in 2018, and as high as the 16th best prospect nationally.

==== 2018 ====
Adames was promoted to the Rays on May 22, 2018, making his major league debut the same day. He got his first hit, a solo home run against Chris Sale, that same night. He was optioned back to Durham three days later to make room for Joey Wendle, who was returning from the paternity list. Adames was later recalled to Tampa on June 11. On July 12, Adames was sent back down to Durham in order to receive more consistent playing time, due to the jam at middle infield between Wendle, Adeiny Hechavarria, Daniel Robertson, and Matt Duffy. Adames hit .226 with a .606 OPS in his second stint. Adames was recalled a third time on July 22. On August 7, Adames hit a walk off solo home run against Miguel Castro of the Baltimore Orioles. In the month of August, Adames was awarded a spot on MLB.com's "team of the month" after slashing .318/.384/.523 with 5 home runs and 14 RBIs. Following a two-hit performance in the final game of the year, Adames ended the season with three straight multi-hit games, helping the Rays reach 90 wins for the first time since 2013. This stretch capped off a strong second half for Adames, who hit .329 in the final two months of the season. Adames ended the season slashing .278/.348/.406 with 10 home runs in 85 games, recording a 2.0 wins above replacement.

==== 2019 ====
In 2019, Adames solidified himself the everyday shortstop, playing 152 games at the position. On May 29, Adames hit a walk-off single to beat the Toronto Blue Jays. On September 29, Adames hit another walk-off single, this time against the Boston Red Sox. This was his third career walk off. On defense in 2019, he recorded 13 Defensive Runs Saved (DRS) and a 2.1 defensive wins above replacement. At the plate, Adames hit .254 with 20 home runs, 52 RBI, and 69 runs scored. Combined with the stellar defense, he recorded 4.2 wins above replacement. In the American League Division Series, Adames posted a .385/.500/.983 slash line, hitting two home runs and a double as the Rays lost to the pennant-winning Houston Astros in five games. In game 4, Adames recorded an assist on a throw dubbed 'The Relay' by local media, where he made a perfect transition and throw, 178 feet away from home plate.

==== 2020 ====
In the shortened 2020 season, Adames played 54 games for the first-place Tampa Bay Rays. He slashed .259/.332/.481 with 8 home runs and 23 RBIs. That year, the Rays won the American League pennant. Adames batted .143 with one RBI in the World Series, which the Rays lost to the Los Angeles Dodgers in six games. Adames was the last out of the 2020 World Series as Julio Urías retired the side and got the save.

==== 2021 ====
Adames batted .197/.254/.371 with 5 home runs and 15 RBI in 41 games for the Rays in 2021.

=== Milwaukee Brewers (2021–2024) ===
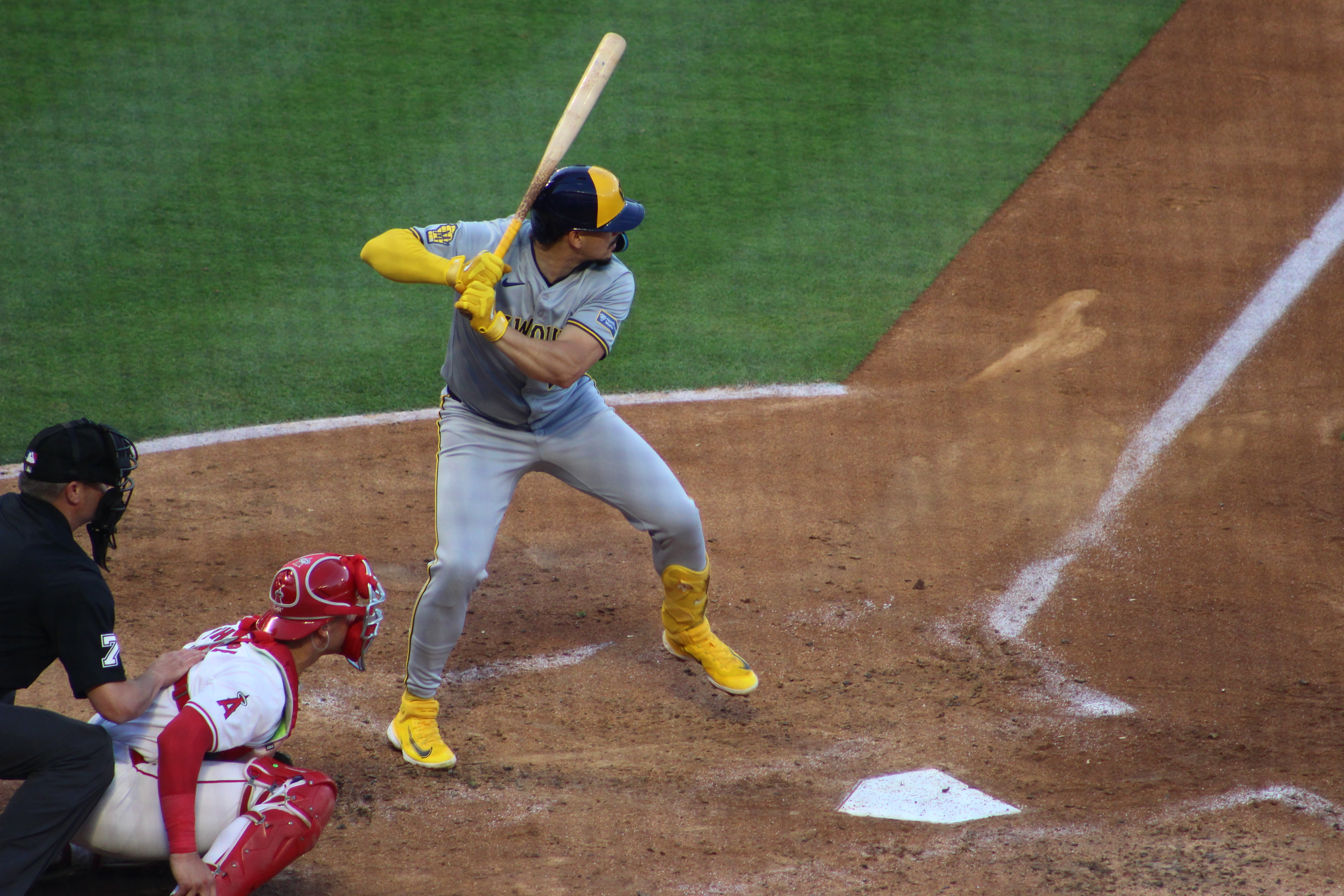
Willy Adames with Milwaukee Brewers, 2024.

On May 21, 2021, the Rays traded Adames alongside Trevor Richards to the Milwaukee Brewers in exchange for relievers Drew Rasmussen and J. P. Feyereisen. On July 16, 2021, Adames had 4 RBI on 3 hits in an 11–6 win over Cincinnati, and on July 18, he won NL Player of the Week. In his 99 games played with the Brewers in the 2021 season, he had 413 plate appearances, batting .285 with a .886 OPS, 20 home runs and 58 RBI's, helping the Brewers win the 2021 NL Central Division. He quickly became a fan favorite in Milwaukee.

On March 22, 2022, Adames signed a $4.6 million contract with the Brewers, avoiding salary arbitration. In the 2022 season, Adames saw a career high in plate appearances (617) and hit a career high in both home runs (31) and RBIs (98). His 31 home runs were a Brewers franchise record for home runs hit by a shortstop in a season, breaking Robin Yount's record of 29.

On January 13, 2023, Adames agreed to a one-year, $8.7 million contract with the Brewers, avoiding salary arbitration.

On September 2, 2024, Adames tied the major league shortstop record for hitting a home run in five consecutive games. Adames shares the record with Eddie Miller (1940), Alex Rodriguez (1999 and 2003), Corey Seager (2022), Trea Turner (2023) and Tyler Fitzgerald (2024). Adames ended the year with a 4.7 wins above replacement, making him one of the 20 most valuable players in the league by that metric in the 2024 season. He started all but one of the Brewers' regular season games, had a slash line of .251/.331/.462, and hit 18% better than the average major league player (OPS+).

=== San Francisco Giants ===
On December 10, 2024, Adames signed a seven-year, $182 million contract with the San Francisco Giants. The contract included a $22 million signing bonus, a full no-trade clause, and no deferred money. As of December 2024, it is the largest contract ever given out by the Giants. On September 28, 2025, on the final game of the season, Adames became the first Giants player since Barry Bonds (2004) to hit 30 home runs in a single season. He made 160 appearances for San Francisco during the regular season, slashing .225/.318/.421 with 30 home runs, 87 RBI, and 12 stolen bases. Adames was the winner of the 2025 Willie Mac Award.

Adames played in 121 games for the Giants in 2026, batting .230/.289/.424 with 21 home runs and 51 RBI. On August 26, 2026, Adames was diagnosed with a sprained ulnar collateral ligament in his left elbow. He subsequently received a platelet-rich plasma injection as he followed a non–surgical recovery process.
