= John Jaso =

American baseball player (born 1983)

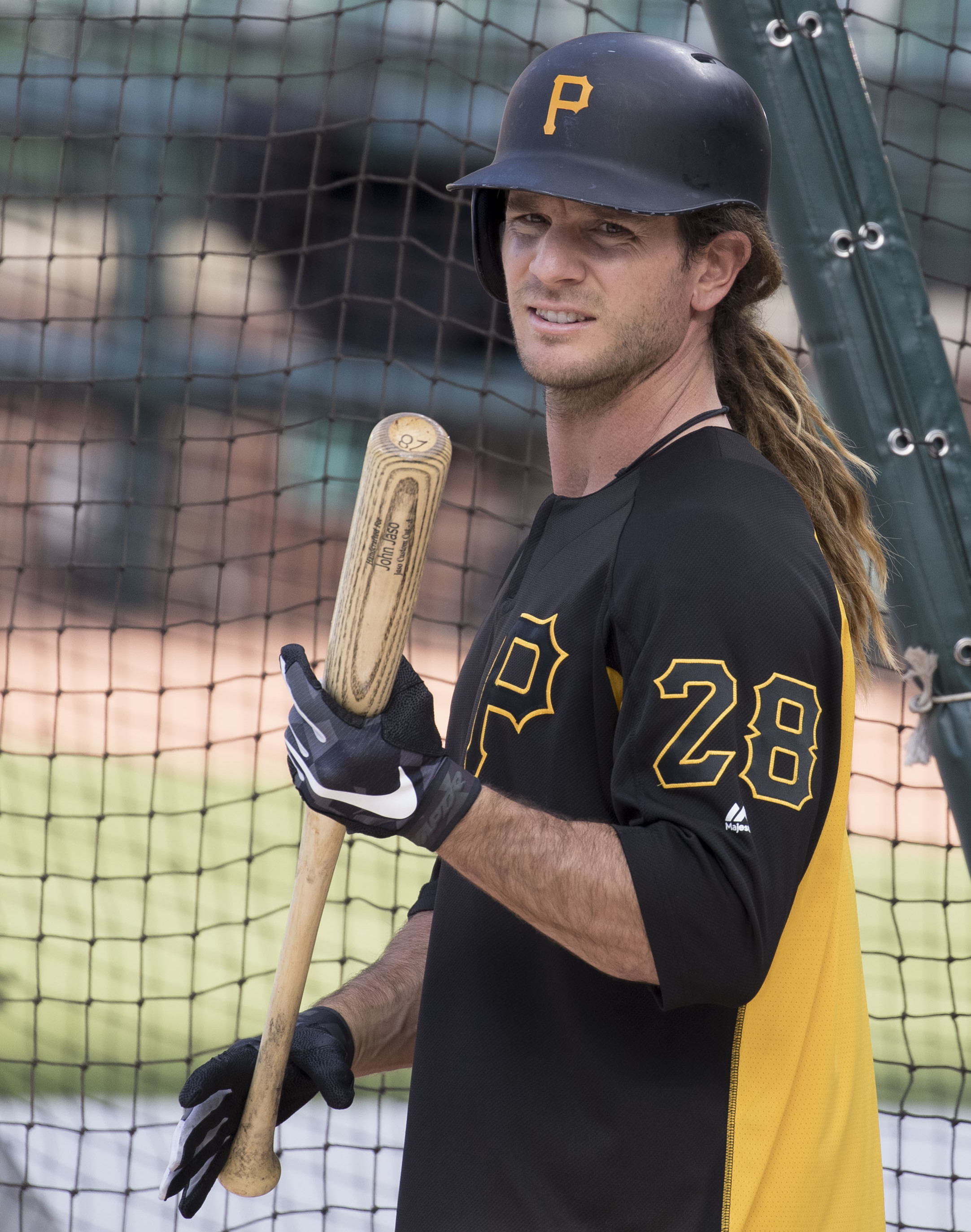
- Jaso with the Pirates in 2017
- Catcher / Designated hitter / First baseman
- Born: September 19, 1983 (age 42); Chula Vista, California, U.S.
- Batted: Left Threw: Right

MLB debut
- September 6, 2008, for the Tampa Bay Rays

Last MLB appearance
- October 1, 2017, for the Pittsburgh Pirates

MLB statistics
- Batting average: .258
- Home runs: 55
- Runs batted in: 281
- Stats at Baseball Reference

Teams
- Tampa Bay Rays (2008, 2010–2011); Seattle Mariners (2012); Oakland Athletics (2013–2014); Tampa Bay Rays (2015); Pittsburgh Pirates (2016–2017)

John Edward Jaso (/ˈdʒeɪsoʊ/; born September 19, 1983) is an American former professional baseball first baseman. Jaso mostly served as a designated hitter and catcher throughout his career, but had to stop catching due to concussion issues. He played in Major League Baseball (MLB) for the Tampa Bay Rays, Seattle Mariners, Oakland Athletics, and Pittsburgh Pirates.

== Amateur career ==
Born in Chula Vista, California, Jaso graduated from McKinleyville High School in McKinleyville, California, in 2001. Jaso then attended Southwestern College, a community college in Chula Vista.

== Professional career ==
=== Tampa Bay Rays ===
Jaso was originally drafted by the Tampa Bay Devil Rays in the 12th round (338th overall) of the 2003 Major League Baseball draft.

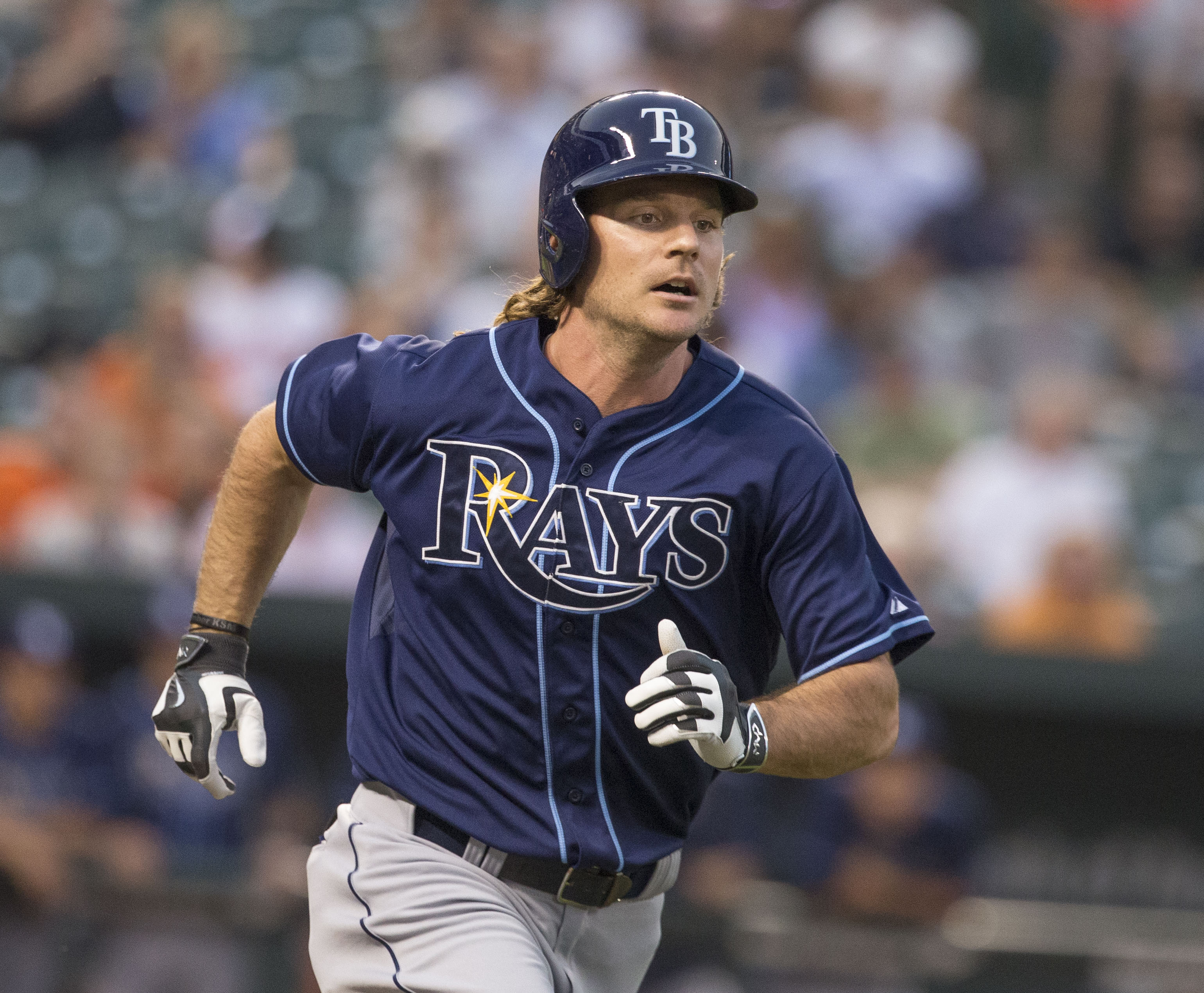
Jaso with the Tampa Bay Rays

Jaso began his professional career playing for the Low Single-A Hudson Valley Renegades for two seasons from 2003 to 2004. He had a .221 batting average in 2003, but improved to .302 in 2004 and was also a postseason All-Star for that season. He took the next step in 2005, playing for the Single-A Southwest Michigan Devil Rays. He had a .307 batting average and had 14 home runs, his most of any season to date. Also, he was a midseason and postseason All-Star. In 2006, he took another step, playing for the High Single-A Visalia Oaks and his season included being named to the midseason All-Star team. In 2007, he played for the Double-A Montgomery Biscuits. His .316 batting average was second in the Southern League, on-base percentage of .408 was third among league leaders and a slugging percentage of .484 was good enough for sixth in the league. His best minor-league season included being named to the midseason and postseason All-Star team and was also Topps Southern League Player of the Month for August. Baseball America and Topps also named him as a Double-A All-Star after the season.

The Tampa Bay Rays purchased Jaso's contract on November 20, 2007, protecting him from the Rule 5 draft. He made his major league debut on September 6, 2008.

In spring training with Tampa Bay in 2011, he led the majors in stolen bases given up with 18, while only catching two runners.

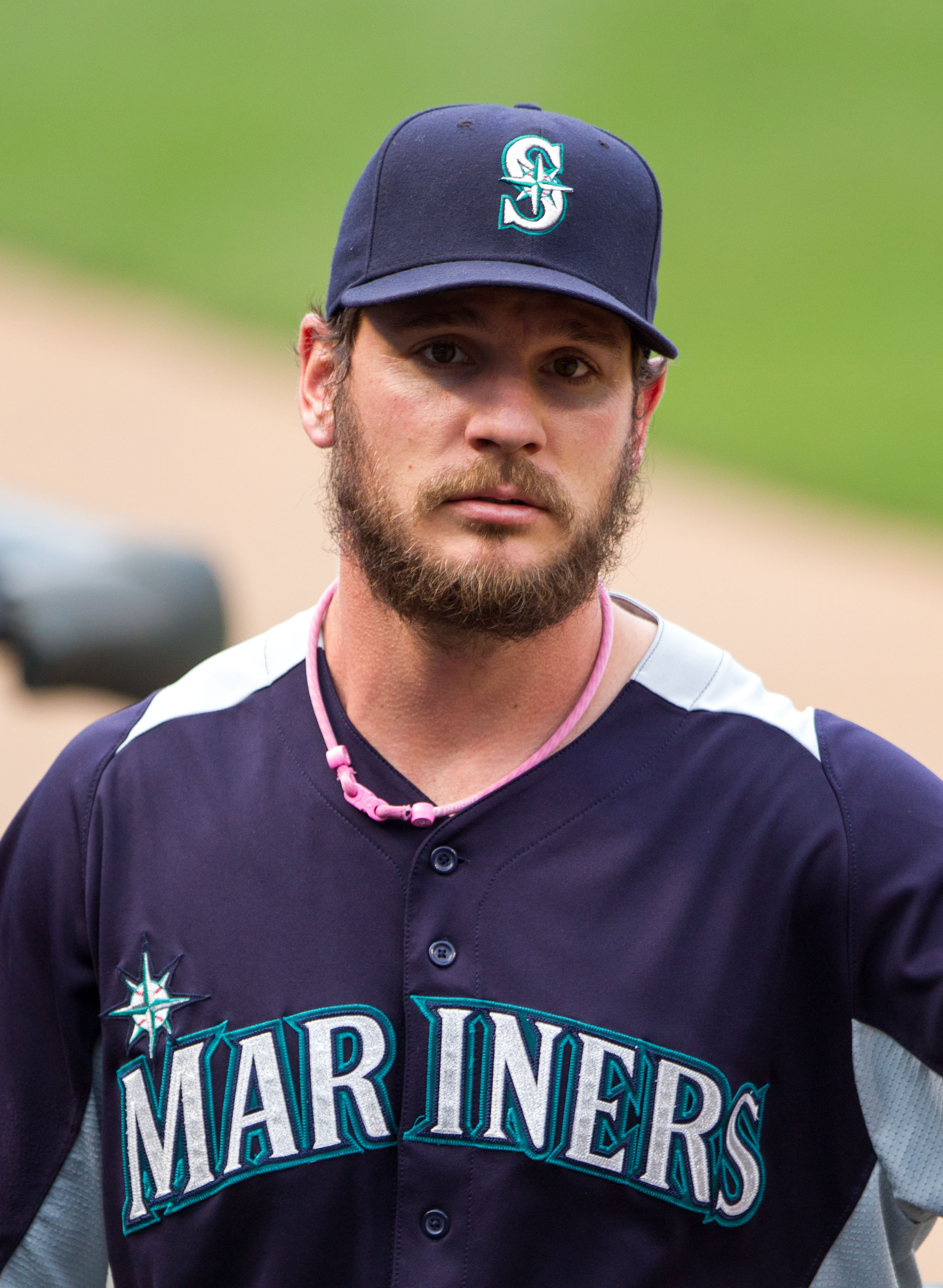
Jaso with the Seattle Mariners in 2012

=== Seattle Mariners ===
On November 27, 2011, he was traded to the Seattle Mariners for Josh Lueke and a player to be named later. On August 15, 2012, he caught teammate Félix Hernández's perfect game against his former team, the Tampa Bay Rays.

=== Oakland Athletics ===
On January 16, 2013, Jaso was traded to the Oakland Athletics in a three-team trade that sent Michael Morse to the Mariners and Ian Krol, A. J. Cole, and Blake Treinen to the Washington Nationals. Jaso sought salary arbitration before the 2014 regular season began, and eventually agreed to a one-year contract worth $2.3 million.

=== Second stint with the Rays ===
On January 10, 2015, Jaso was traded to the Tampa Bay Rays with Daniel Robertson and Boog Powell for Yunel Escobar and Ben Zobrist.

=== Pittsburgh Pirates ===
On December 23, 2015, Jaso signed a two-year, $8 million contract with the Pittsburgh Pirates. He hit for the cycle on September 28, 2016, against the Chicago Cubs, the first cycle in PNC Park history.

On October 1, 2017, Jaso told the Pittsburgh Post-Gazette that he was going to retire and travel. After retiring from professional baseball, Jaso acquired the sailboat Roaming Rose.

== See also ==
- List of Major League Baseball players to hit for the cycle

Achievements
| Preceded by Rajai Davis | Hitting for the cycle September 28, 2016 | Succeeded by Wil Myers |
