= José Alvarado (baseball) =

Venezuelan baseball player (born 1995)

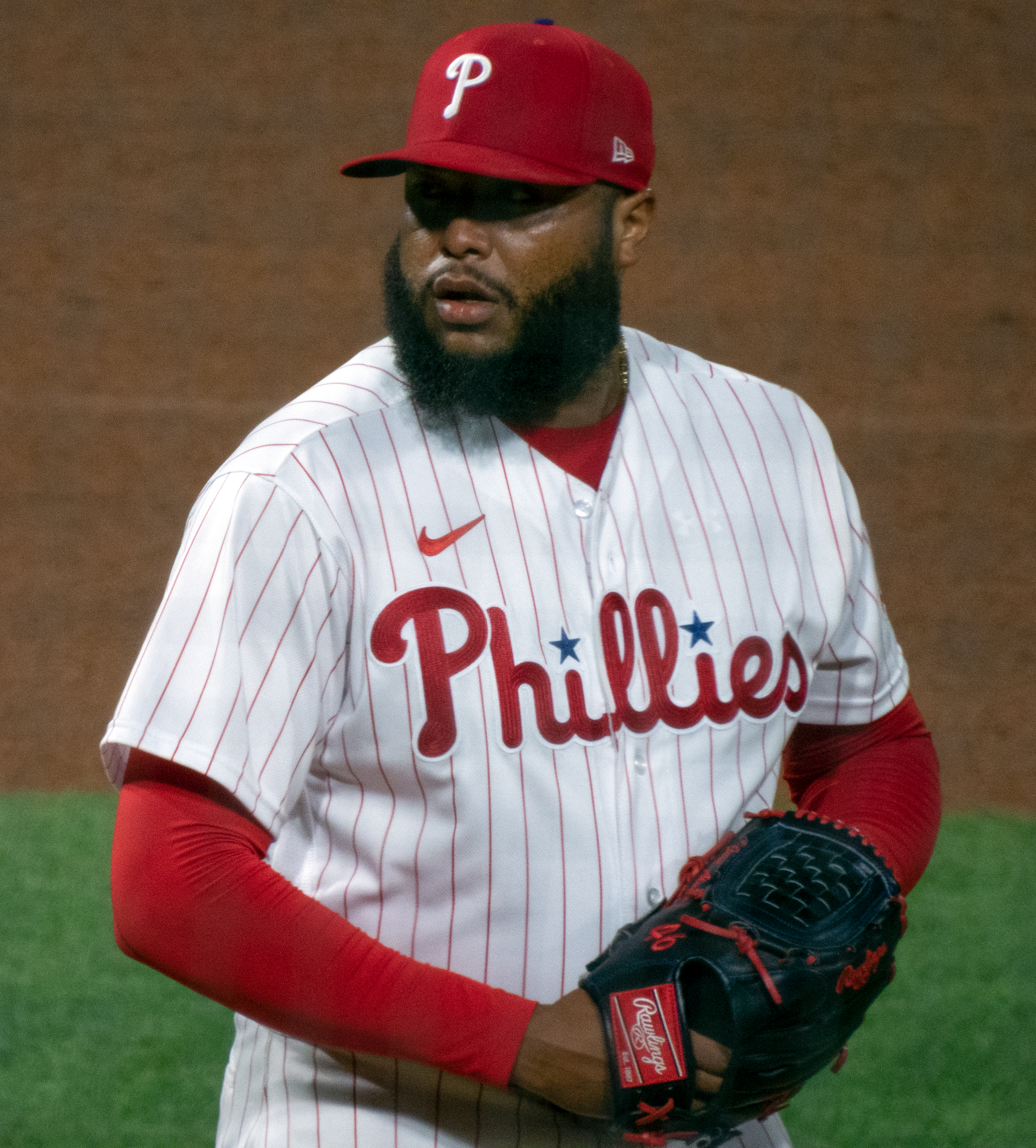
- Alvarado pitching for the Philadelphia Phillies in 2022

Free agent
- Pitcher
- Born: May 21, 1995 (age 31); Maracaibo, Zulia, Venezuela
- Bats: Left Throws: Left

MLB debut
- May 3, 2017, for the Tampa Bay Rays

Career statistics (through 2026 season)
- Win–loss record: 24–31
- Earned run average: 3.80
- Strikeouts: 539
- Saves: 53
- Stats at Baseball Reference

Teams
- Tampa Bay Rays (2017–2020); Philadelphia Phillies (2021–2026)

José Antonio Alvarado (born May 21, 1995) is a Venezuelan professional baseball pitcher who is a free agent. He has played in Major League Baseball (MLB) for the Tampa Bay Rays and Philadelphia Phillies. Alvarado signed with the Rays as an international free agent in 2012 and made his MLB debut in 2017.

== Early life ==
Alvarado was born in Maracaibo, Venezuela. During Alvarado's childhood, Maracaibo was known for its high crime rates, including kidnappings and assault, and he attempted to stay out of trouble while garnering a sense of fearlessness. Alvarado dropped out of school at the age of 14 in order to support his family through farm work. He preferred soccer to baseball, but was turned onto baseball when his physical education teacher told him that, as a left-handed athlete, he had a future as a pitcher.

== Professional career ==
=== Tampa Bay Rays ===
==== Minor leagues ====
The Tampa Bay Rays took an interest in Alvarado when he pitched at a showcase for Major League Baseball (MLB) scouts, and he was invited to pitch at the Rays' Venezuelan academy. The Rays signed him in 2012, as part of an ongoing push from the club to pursue international baseball talent. He made his professional baseball debut in 2012 as a 17-year-old in the Venezuelan Summer League (VSL). In 12 games and 26 innings pitched, Alvarado posted a 2–3 win–loss record with a 3.81 earned run average (ERA) and 20 strikeouts. The following year, he returned to the VSL, going 1–8 with a 1.97 ERA and 54 strikeouts in 13 starts and 45 2/3 innings. In 2015, he was taken to the US for a season with the Gulf Coast League Rays. There, Alvarado posted a 1–5 record with a 3.79 ERA and 46 strikeouts in 12 games and 40 1/3 innings.

In 2015, Alvarado still played in rookie league, and struggled mightily in 5 starts, posting an ERA of 9.53 as he walked 13 batters in 17 innings. In 2016, Alvarado converted to the bullpen and improved dramatically, posting a 3.06 ERA between Low-A and High-A with an 85/55 K/BB ratio in 70 2/3 innings, but walked 7.4 batters per nine innings. The Rays added him to their 40-man roster after the 2016 season. In 2017, he played for the Double-A Montgomery Biscuits, posting a 2–1 record in 9 games (11 1/3 innings) with an ERA of 2.38.

==== Major leagues ====
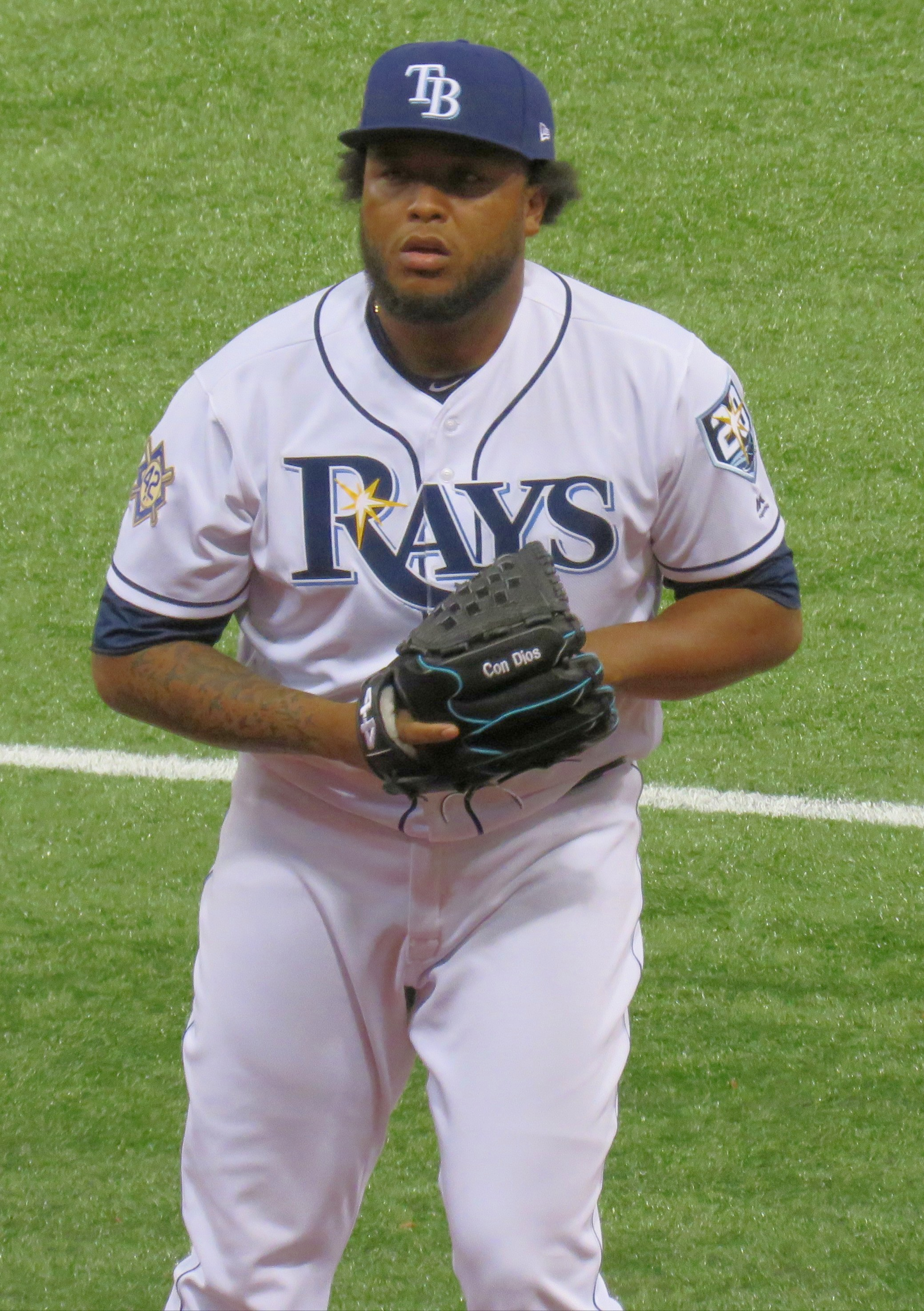
Alvarado with the Tampa Bay Rays.

On May 3, 2017, Alvarado was called up directly from Montgomery to give the Rays a left-handed option out of the bullpen, at 21 years of age. He made his debut the same day, getting hit hard and allowing 3 runs on 2 hits in his only inning of work. Alvarado calmed down after his debut, only allowing one run in his next 10 appearances. On August 4, 2017, he pitched an immaculate inning against the Milwaukee Brewers in a game at Tropicana Field. Alvarado finished the season 0–3 with a 3.64 ERA in 29 2/3 innings.

In 2018, Alvarado was a key contributor to the Rays bullpen, specifically in late, high leverage situations. Overall, he finished the season with a 2.39 ERA (ranking second on his team), 8 saves (third on team), 31 holds (tied for most in the American League (AL) with teammate Chaz Roe), an 11.3 strikeouts per nine IP (highest on team) in 64 innings over 70 games (second most on team).

During the 2019 season, Alvarado struggled with inconsistency and injury, appearing in only 35 games after leaving the United States in June for family reasons, being placed on the 10-day injured list with a right oblique strain, and spending the entire month of September on the injured list with left elbow inflammation. In 30 innings, Alvarado posted a 4.80 ERA, striking out 39 batters while walking 27 — nearly one an inning.

On August 15, 2020, Alvarado was placed on the 10-day injured list with left shoulder inflammation. He was later shifted to the 45-day injured list and missed the remainder of the season. On the year for Tampa Bay, Alvarado pitched to a 6.00 ERA with 13 strikeouts across 9 innings pitched in as many appearances.

=== Philadelphia Phillies ===
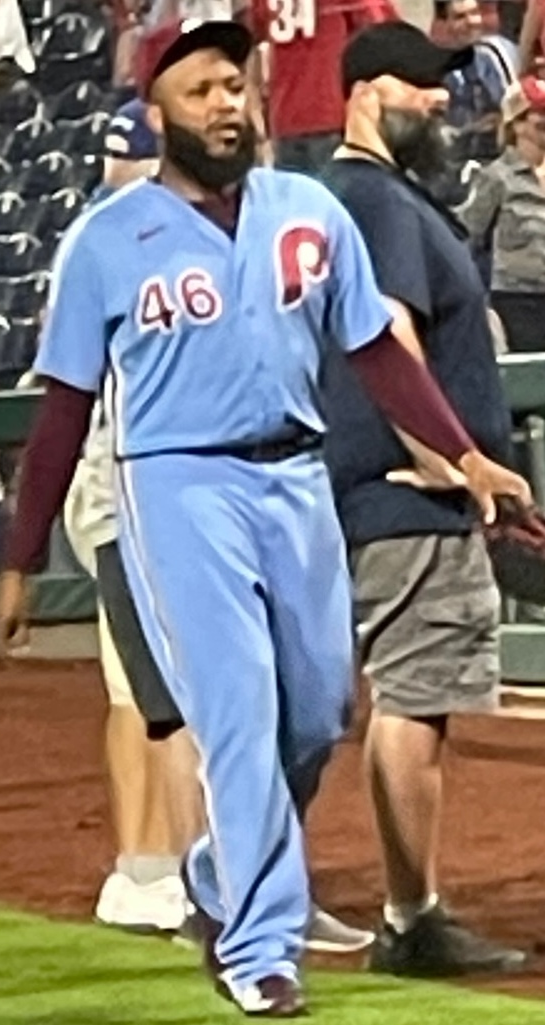
Alvarado with the Phillies in 2022

On December 29, 2020, Alvarado was traded to the Philadelphia Phillies as part of a three-team trade that sent Garrett Cleavinger from Philadelphia to the Los Angeles Dodgers and minor leaguer Dillon Paulson and a player to be named later from the Dodgers to the Rays. In 2021, Alvarado recorded a 4.20 ERA and struck out 68 batters while walking 47 in 55 2/3 innings of relief. He had the highest walk rate of any pitcher with more than 50 innings that year (18.7%).

On March 22, 2022, Alvarado signed a $1.9 million contract with the Phillies, avoiding salary arbitration. In the regular season, he was 4–2 with two saves and a 3.18 ERA in 51 innings over 59 relief appearances, averaging 4.2 walks and 14.3 strikeouts per nine innings. Alvarado appeared in twelve games of the postseason for the Phillies that year, recording three holds, a win in Game 5 of the pennant clinching game, and went one-for-two in saves. In Game 4 of the 2022 World Series, he was sent out to defend a precarious situation in relief of Aaron Nola: bases loaded and no outs in the fifth inning with Yordan Alvarez at the plate. His first pitch hit Alvarez, driving in the runner from third. Alvarado then allowed a double to right from Alex Bregman to score two runs before a sacrifice fly by Kyle Tucker and a hit by Yuli Gurriel capped the scoring at five runs, which proved key in the 5–0 win by Houston. In Game 6, he was sent out to relieve Zach Wheeler in the sixth inning with two on base and one out in a 1–0 game, with Yordan Alvarez at the plate. On the third pitch, Alvarez hit a deep home run to center field to give the Astros the lead. Alvarado struck out a batter before walking one on his way off the mound. The Phillies lost the game 4–1, losing the series .

On February 17, 2023, Alvarado signed a three-year, $21.5 million contract extension with the Phillies that included a $9 million club option for 2026. In 42 appearances out of the bullpen, he compiled an 0–2 record and 1.74 ERA with 64 strikeouts and 10 saves across 41 1/3 innings pitched. Alvarado made 66 relief appearances for Philadelphia during the 2024 campaign, registering a 2–5 record and 4.09 ERA with 63 strikeouts and a career-high 13 saves across 61 2/3 innings of work.

On May 18, 2025, he was suspended 80 games without pay for violating Major League Baseball's performance-enhancing drug (PED) policy. On August 5, Alvarado issued a statement on the incident two weeks prior to the end of the suspension, stating that he "would never intend" to use a banned substance while also admitting that he had made a mistake taking exogenous testosterone and had accepted "the consequences set forth by MLB." He was officially activated from the suspension on August 19. In 28 total appearances for Philadelphia on the year, Alvarado posted a 4–2 record and 3.81 ERA with 32 strikeouts and seven saves across 26 innings of work. On September 12, Alvarado was placed on the injured list due to a left forearm strain; he was subsequently ruled out for the season the following day by manager Rob Thomson.

== Scouting profile ==
Alvarado is 6 feet 2 inches (1.88 m) tall and weighs 245 pounds (111 kg). He throws a sinker, which ranges from 98 to 102 mph, and a cutter that can range from 89 to 96 mph. After posting a 7.62 ERA through 17 appearances in 2022, he was optioned to Triple-A to improve his command. When he returned to the big leagues, he began exclusively using the Cutter as his primary off-speed pitch and abandoned his curveball. This change greatly benefited him, and as of August 27, 2022, Alvarado has generated a 55.3% whiff rate on his cutter, throwing it 43.3% of the time, much more than his previous 16.3% usage rate of the pitch last year.

== Personal life ==
Alvarado grew up in Venezuela. He likes to hunt 3-foot iguanas and paca with a slingshot. Alvarado has two children, a daughter and a son.

== See also ==
- List of Major League Baseball players from Venezuela
