= Johnny Davis (baseball, born 1990) =

American baseball player (born 1990)

- Outfielder
- Born: April 26, 1990 (age 35); Compton, California, U.S.
- Batted: Switch Threw: Right

MLB debut
- September 11, 2019, for the Tampa Bay Rays

Last MLB appearance
- September 29, 2019, for the Tampa Bay Rays

MLB statistics
- Batting average: .250
- Home runs: 0
- Runs batted in: 0
- Stats at Baseball Reference

Teams
- Tampa Bay Rays (2019)

Johnathan Lewis Davis (born April 26, 1990) is an American former professional baseball outfielder. He played one season in Major League Baseball (MLB) for the Tampa Bay Rays in 2019.

== Career ==
Davis attended Compton High School in Compton, California. Davis did not play baseball in high school, and had only played one year of organized baseball as a little leaguer at age 13. Davis attended West Los Angeles College in 2013, where he hit .336/.374/.549/.923 with 3 home runs, 23 RBI, and 22 stolen bases in his only season of college baseball.

=== Milwaukee Brewers ===
Davis was drafted by the Milwaukee Brewers in the 22nd round, with the 662nd overall selection, of the 2013 MLB draft.

Davis played for the AZL Brewers in 2013, hitting .294/.351/.363/.714 with 9 RBI and 17 stolen bases. He played for the Wisconsin Timber Rattlers in 2014, hitting .258/.317/.284/.601 with 16 RBI and 32 stolen bases. He played for the Brevard County Manatees in 2015, hitting .216/.256/.270/.526 in just 10 games due to a torn anterior cruciate ligament (ACL). He split the 2016 season between Brevard County and the Biloxi Shuckers, hitting a combined .278/.353/.336/.689 with 1 home run, 20 RBI, and 32 stolen bases. He returned to Biloxi for the 2017 season, hitting .263/.316/.341/.657 with 5 home runs, 30 RBI, and 52 stolen bases. He opened the 2018 season with the Colorado Springs Sky Sox and appeared in nine games before being granted his release by the Brewers that April.

=== Kansas City T-Bones ===
On May 23, 2018, Davis signed with the Kansas City T-Bones of the American Association. In 11 games he hit .273/.286/.364 with 0 home runs, 8 RBIs and 6 stolen bases.

=== Tecolotes de los Dos Laredos ===
On July 3, 2018, Davis signed with the Tecolotes de los Dos Laredos of the Mexican League, hitting .312/.384/.485/.869 with 4 home runs, 25 RBI, and 28 stolen bases. He returned to Dos Laredos in 2019, hitting .298/.356/.392/.749 with 4 home runs, 33 RBI, and 48 stolen bases in 92 games.

=== Guerreros de Oaxaca ===
On July 29, 2019, Davis was loaned to the Guerreros de Oaxaca. In 14 games he hit .308/.333/.385 with no home runs, five RBI, and six stolen bases. He became a free agent following the season.

=== Tampa Bay Rays ===
On August 29, 2019, Davis signed a minor league contract with the Tampa Bay Rays. He appeared in six games between the Montgomery Biscuits and the Durham Bulls.

The Rays selected Davis' contract and promoted him to the major leagues on September 11, 2019. He made his major league debut that night versus the Texas Rangers as a pinch runner. Davis recorded his first career hit on September 13, a pinch hit triple off Jake Jewell. Davis was removed from the 40–man roster and sent outright to Durham on October 30; he elected free agency four days later.

Davis re-signed with the Rays on a minor league contract on February 3, 2020. Davis did not play in a game in 2020 due to the cancellation of the minor league season because of the COVID-19 pandemic. He became a free agent on November 2.

=== Sultanes de Monterrey ===
On June 11, 2021, Davis signed with the Sultanes de Monterrey of the Mexican League. He appeared in three games for Monterrey, going 3-for-11 with two RBI, before he was moved to the injured list on June 17. On June 28, Davis was released by the Sultanes.

=== Mariachis de Guadalajara ===
On July 8, 2021, Davis signed with the Mariachis de Guadalajara of the Mexican League. In 10 appearances for Guadalajara, he batted .316/.395/.658 with two home runs, 12 RBI, and three stolen bases. Davis became a free agent following the season.

=== Gastonia Honey Hunters ===
On March 27, 2022, Davis signed with the Gastonia Honey Hunters of the Atlantic League of Professional Baseball. In 21 games for Gastonia, Davis batted .307/.371/.398 with 13 RBI and nine stolen bases.

=== Leones de Yucatán ===
On May 25, 2022, Davis's contract was purchased by the Leones de Yucatán of the Mexican League. He played in 17 games for Yucatán, hitting .200/.232/.262 with one home run, four RBI, and 8 stolen bases. Davis won the Mexican League Championship with the Leones in 2022.

On February 20, 2023, Davis retired from professional baseball.

=== Charros de Jalisco ===
On March 19, 2024, Davis came out of retirement and signed with the Toros de Tijuana of the Mexican League. On March 27, Davis was traded to the Charros de Jalisco. He did not make the team and became a free agent before the season started.
