= Joey Wendle =

American baseball player (born 1990)

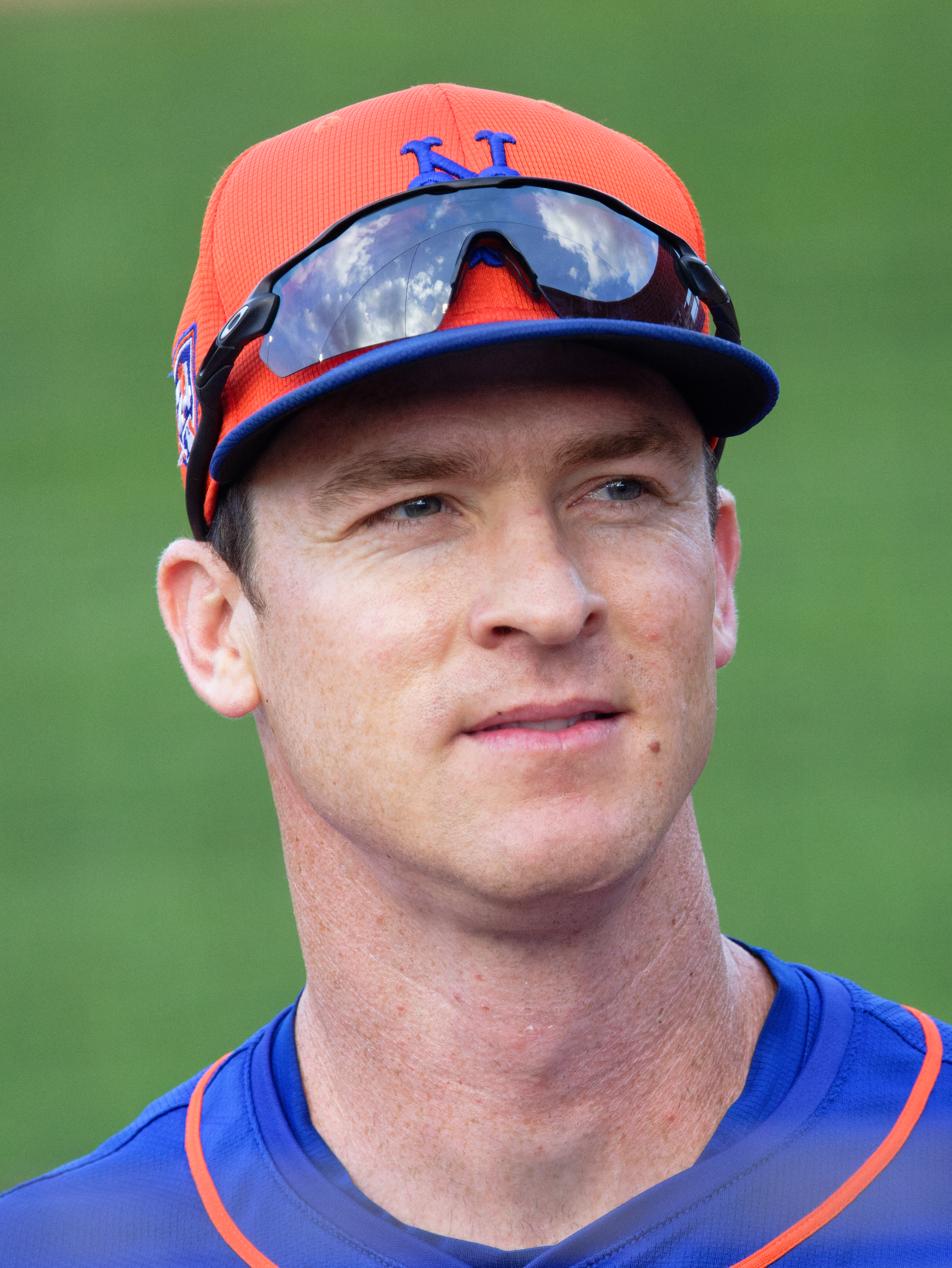
- Wendle with the Mets in 2024
- Infielder
- Born: April 26, 1990 (age 36); Wilmington, Delaware, U.S.
- Batted: Left Threw: Right

MLB debut
- August 31, 2016, for the Oakland Athletics

Last MLB appearance
- May 14, 2024, for the New York Mets

MLB statistics
- Batting average: .262
- Home runs: 32
- Runs batted in: 220
- Stats at Baseball Reference

Teams
- Oakland Athletics (2016–2017); Tampa Bay Rays (2018–2021); Miami Marlins (2022–2023); New York Mets (2024)

Career highlights and awards
- All-Star (2021)

Joseph Patrick Wendle (born April 26, 1990) is an American former professional baseball infielder. He has previously played in Major League Baseball (MLB) for the Oakland Athletics, Tampa Bay Rays, Miami Marlins, and New York Mets. Wendle made his MLB debut in 2016 with the Athletics. He is one of the few MLB players to not use batting gloves.

== Early life ==
Wendle was born in Wilmington, Delaware on April 26, 1990. He attended Avon Grove High School in West Grove, Pennsylvania, and West Chester University. Wendle played travel baseball for the Chester County Crawdads.

Wendle was a four-year starter for the West Chester Golden Rams baseball team, where he compiled a .366 career batting average with 23 home runs and 185 runs batted in (RBIs). During his senior season, Wendle hit .399 with 12 home runs and 59 RBIs as the Golden Rams went on to win the 2012 NCAA Division II baseball tournament.

== Professional career ==
=== Cleveland Indians ===
The Cleveland Indians selected Wendle in the sixth round of the 2012 Major League Baseball draft. He made his professional debut with the Mahoning Valley Scrappers of the Low–A New York-Penn League. In 61 games he hit .327/.375/.469 with four home runs and 37 (RBI).

Wendle played the 2013 season with the Carolina Mudcats of the High–A Carolina League. He hit .295/.372/.513 with 16 home runs and 64 RBI over 107 games. He won the Lou Boudreau Award as the Indians minor league player of the year. He started the 2014 season with the Akron RubberDucks of the Double–A Eastern League.

=== Oakland Athletics ===
On December 8, 2014, the Indians traded Wendle to the Oakland Athletics for Brandon Moss. On April 21, 2015, Wendle (as a member of Oakland's Triple-A affiliate, the Nashville Sounds) hit the first home run in the history of First Tennessee Park. The Athletics added him to their 40-man roster after the season.

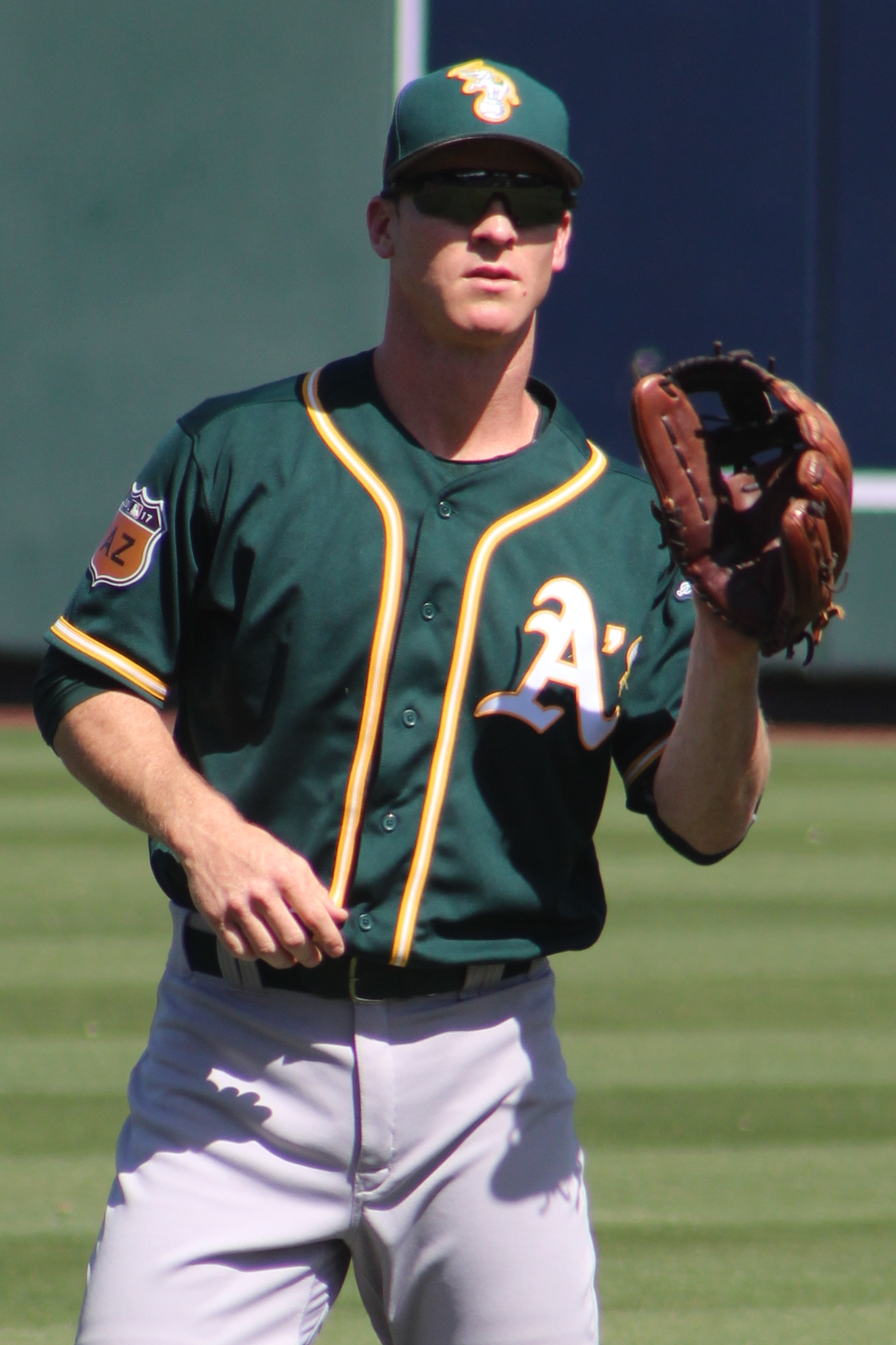
Wendle with the Oakland Athletics in 2017

Wendle began the 2016 season with Nashville. The Athletics promoted Wendle to the major leagues on August 31, 2016. He made his major league debut that day. Over the next season and a half, Wendle would appear in 36 games for the Athletics, collecting 29 hits in 109 at bats. Following the conclusion of the 2017 season, Wendle was designated for assignment on December 7, 2017.

=== Tampa Bay Rays ===
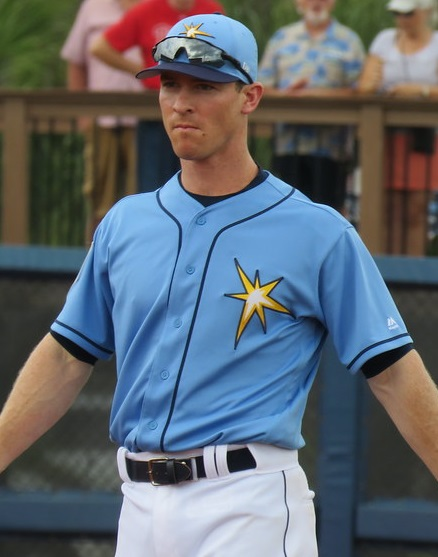
Wendle with the Rays in 2018

On December 11, 2017, the Athletics traded Wendle to the Tampa Bay Rays for catcher Jonah Heim. Wendle entered spring training in 2018 competing for the starting second baseman job with Micah Johnson and Daniel Robertson. After hitting .327 in 52 spring training at bats, Rays manager Kevin Cash announced Wendle had made the team's Opening Day roster to platoon at second base with Robertson.

Wendle ended the season leading all rookies in wins above replacement (4.3), batting average (.300), on-base percentage (.350), and triples (6), as well as placing second in hits (146), doubles (33), and runs (62). Wendle was the first Rays player since 2011 to hit .300, and the first rookie to ever reach that mark. He tied for the major league lead in sacrifice flies (10). At the conclusion of the season, Wendle was unanimously chosen as the Rays Outstanding Rookie award for the 2018 season and finished fourth in the American League Rookie of the Year award.

Wendle began the 2019 season starting at second base with the intention of playing nearly every day. However, on March 31, Wendle injured his hamstring tagging out Jake Marisnick attempting to steal second base and was placed on the 10-day injured list. He was activated 3 weeks later. He was placed back on the disabled list on April 24 due to a fracture in his right wrist by a hit by pitch. Overall, Wendle ended the season playing in just 75 games. Wendle appeared in 5 postseason games, recording 2 hits in 10 at bats as the Rays were eliminated In the ALDS in five games by the Houston Astros.

In 2020, Wendle started 50 games for the Rays despite being considered a back-up player. His defensive versatility allowed him to give fellow teammates Willy Adames and Brandon Lowe games off, while platooning at third base with Yandy Diaz. For the season, Wendle hit .286 with 4 home runs and 17 RBIs as the Rays clinched their first division title in ten years. In the ALDS against the Yankees, Wendle hit .353 as the Rays beat the Yankees in 5 games. Against the Houston Astros in the ALCS, Wendle garnered attention for his stellar defense at third base. Houston Astros manager Dusty Baker went as far to compare his play to Brooks Robinson. The Rays would go on to beat the Astros in 7 games.

Wendle was named to the 2021 All-Star Game as a reserve on July 9, 2021. He singled in his only plate appearance.

=== Miami Marlins ===
On November 30, 2021, Tampa Bay traded Wendle to the Miami Marlins in exchange for Kameron Misner.

On January 13, 2023, Wendle agreed to a one-year, $6 million contract with the Marlins, avoiding salary arbitration. He became a free agent following the season.

=== New York Mets ===
On November 30, 2023, Wendle signed a one-year, $2 million contract with the New York Mets. In 18 games for the Mets, he batted .222/.243/.250 with no home runs, one RBI, and one stolen base. On May 15, 2024, Wendle was designated for assignment by the team. He was then released by the Mets organization on May 20.

=== Atlanta Braves ===
On May 24, 2024, Wendle signed a major league contract with the Atlanta Braves. On May 27, Wendle was designated for assignment without making an appearance with the team. He cleared waivers and was sent outright to the Triple–A Gwinnett Stripers on May 29. However, Wendle subsequently rejected the assignment and elected free agency the following day.
