= Emilio Pagán =

American baseball player (born 1991)

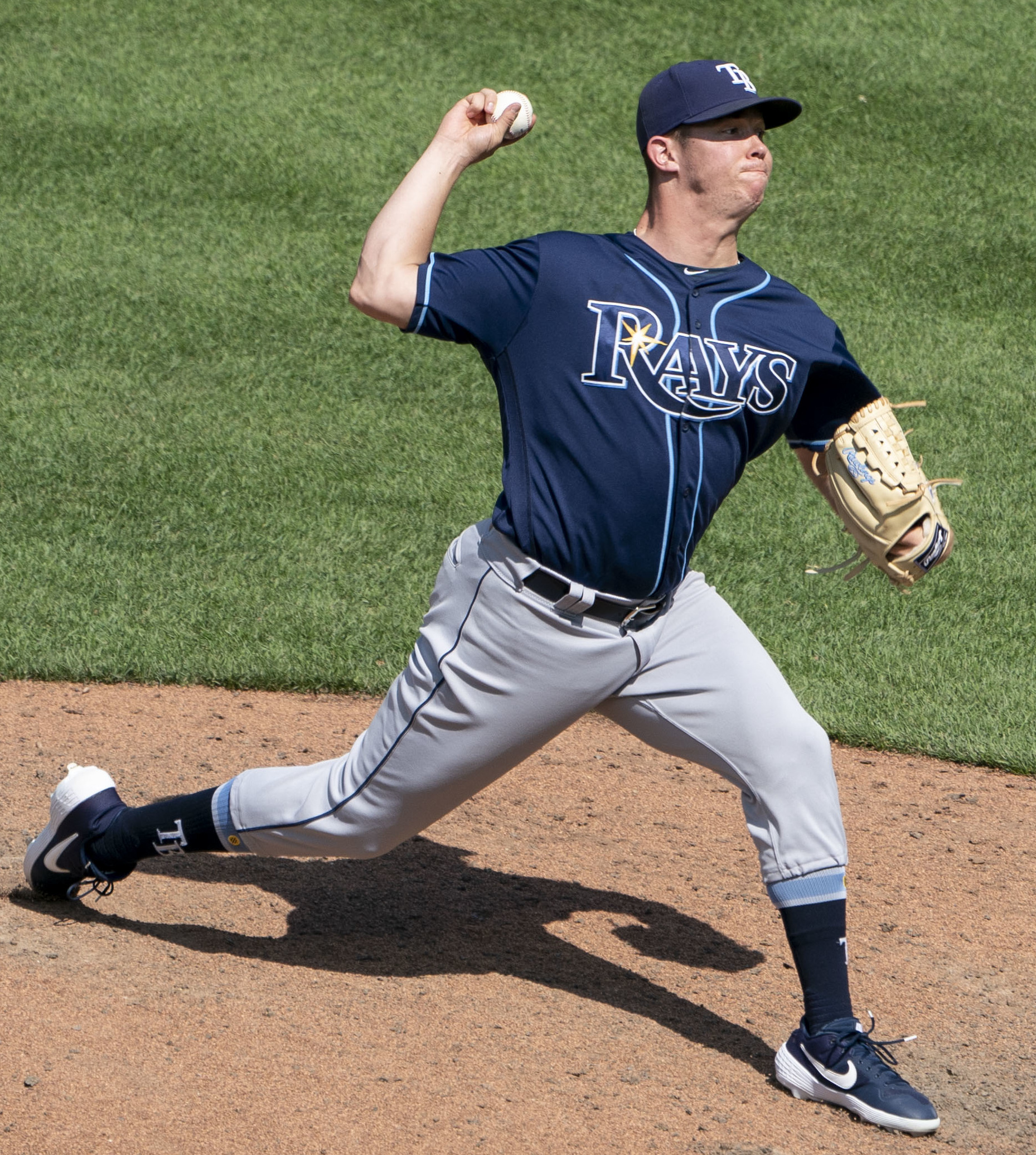
- Pagán with the Tampa Bay Rays in 2019

Detroit Tigers
- Pitcher
- Born: May 7, 1991 (age 35); Simpsonville, South Carolina, U.S.
- Bats: Left Throws: Right

MLB debut
- May 3, 2017, for the Seattle Mariners

MLB statistics (through 2026 season)
- Win–loss record: 33–28
- Earned run average: 3.64
- Strikeouts: 626
- Saves: 90
- Stats at Baseball Reference

Teams
- Seattle Mariners (2017); Oakland Athletics (2018); Tampa Bay Rays (2019); San Diego Padres (2020–2021); Minnesota Twins (2022–2023); Cincinnati Reds (2024–2026)
Medals
Men's baseball
Representing Puerto Rico
World Baseball Classic
Silver medal – second place	2017 Los Angeles	Team

Emilio Enrique Pagán (born May 7, 1991) is an American professional baseball pitcher for the Detroit Tigers of Major League Baseball (MLB). He previously played for the Tampa Bay Rays, Seattle Mariners, Oakland Athletics, San Diego Padres, Minnesota Twins, and Cincinnati Reds. He also plays for the Puerto Rico national baseball team.

== Amateur career ==
Pagán attended J. L. Mann High School in Greenville, South Carolina, and played college baseball at Belmont Abbey College. He was drafted by the Seattle Mariners in the 10th round of the 2013 Major League Baseball draft.

== Professional career ==
=== Seattle Mariners ===
After signing with the Mariners, Pagán made his professional debut that same year with the Pulaski Mariners. He was promoted to the Everett AquaSox in August. In 26.1 relief innings pitched between the two teams he went 1–1 with a 1.03 ERA and 35 strikeouts. In 2014, he pitched for the Clinton LumberKings where he compiled a 2–3 record and 2.89 ERA in 42 relief appearances, in 2015, he played with the Bakersfield Blaze where he pitched to a 3–8 record and 2.53 ERA. Pagán spent 2016 with the Jackson Generals and Tacoma Rainiers, compiling a combined 5–3 record and 2.49 ERA in 65 innings pitched out of the bullpen.

Pagán was on Puerto Rico's roster for the 2017 World Baseball Classic. He began the season with Tacoma and was promoted to the major leagues on May 2. On May 3, 2017, he made his major league debut for the Mariners against the Los Angeles Angels of Anaheim at Safeco Field. He was sent down and recalled multiple times during the season before he was recalled for the remainder of the season on July 7. In 34 relief appearances for Seattle, he was 2–3 with a 3.22 ERA, and in 23 appearances for Tacoma, he was 2–1 with a 2.56 ERA.

=== Oakland Athletics ===
On November 15, 2017, Pagán was traded to the Oakland Athletics, along with Alexander Campos, in exchange for Ryon Healy. He began the season with Oakland, but was sent down to the Nashville Sounds on May 2. He was recalled to Oakland on May 18.

=== Tampa Bay Rays ===
On December 21, 2018, the Athletics traded Pagán to the Tampa Bay Rays in a three-team deal in which the Rays also acquired Rollie Lacy and a competitive balance pick in the 2019 MLB draft, the Athletics acquired Jurickson Profar, and the Texas Rangers acquired Brock Burke, Kyle Bird, Yoel Espinal, Eli White, and $750,000 of international signing bonus pool space.

In 2019, after an impressive spring training, Pagán was sent to the Triple-A Durham Bulls. He was recalled on April 16, after Blake Snell fractured his toe. On April 19, Pagán was optioned to Durham when Casey Sadler was recalled, then Pagán was recalled two days later. Pagán later became the team's closer and finished the season recording 20 saves. He finished with a 2.31 ERA and 96 strikeouts in 70 innings.

=== San Diego Padres ===
On February 8, 2020, the Rays traded Pagán to the San Diego Padres in exchange for Manuel Margot and Logan Driscoll. Through August 20, 2020, Pagán had blown four saves and pitched to a 7.36 ERA, but after that point, he recorded 10 out of 11 scoreless innings, only surrendering 2 runs with a 1.64 ERA to finish the season. Emilio finished 2020 with a 4.50 ERA for the Padres and a 4.83 ERA in 2021.

=== Minnesota Twins ===
The Padres traded Pagán, Chris Paddack and a player to be named later to the Minnesota Twins for Taylor Rogers, Brent Rooker, and cash considerations on April 7, 2022. The player to be named later was minor-league pitcher Brayan Medina. Pagán went 4–6 with a 4.43 ERA in 59 relief appearances during the 2022 season. He also recorded nine saves.

The Twins and Pagán avoided salary arbitration by agreeing to a one year, $3.5 million contract on January 13, 2023. He went 5–2 with a 2.99 ERA during the 2023 season, recording one save. Pagán also made his first career major league start against the Colorado Rockies as an opener on September 30.

=== Cincinnati Reds ===
The Cincinnati Reds signed Pagán to a one-year contract with an option for a second season on December 1, 2023. He began the 2024 season out of Cincinnati's bullpen, compiling a 4.43 ERA with 26 strikeouts across 22 games. Pagán was placed on the injured list with a right lat strain on June 9, and transferred to the 60–day injured list on June 27. He was activated on August 10.

On December 4, 2025, Pagán re-signed with Cincinnati on a two-year, $20 million contract. On October 31, 2026, Pagán declined his player option making him a free agent.

=== Detroit Tigers ===
On November 17, 2026, Pagán signed with the Detroit Tigers on a one-year, $11.5 million contract.

== International career ==
Pagán pitched for the Puerto Rico national baseball team in the 2017 World Baseball Classic and the 2023 World Baseball Classic. He pitched two scoreless innings and helped Puerto Rico earn a silver medal in the 2017 World Baseball Classic. Pagán pitched one scoreless inning for Puerto Rico during the 2023 World Baseball Classic, helping his team reach the quarterfinals.
