= Daniel Robertson (infielder) =

American baseball player (born 1994)

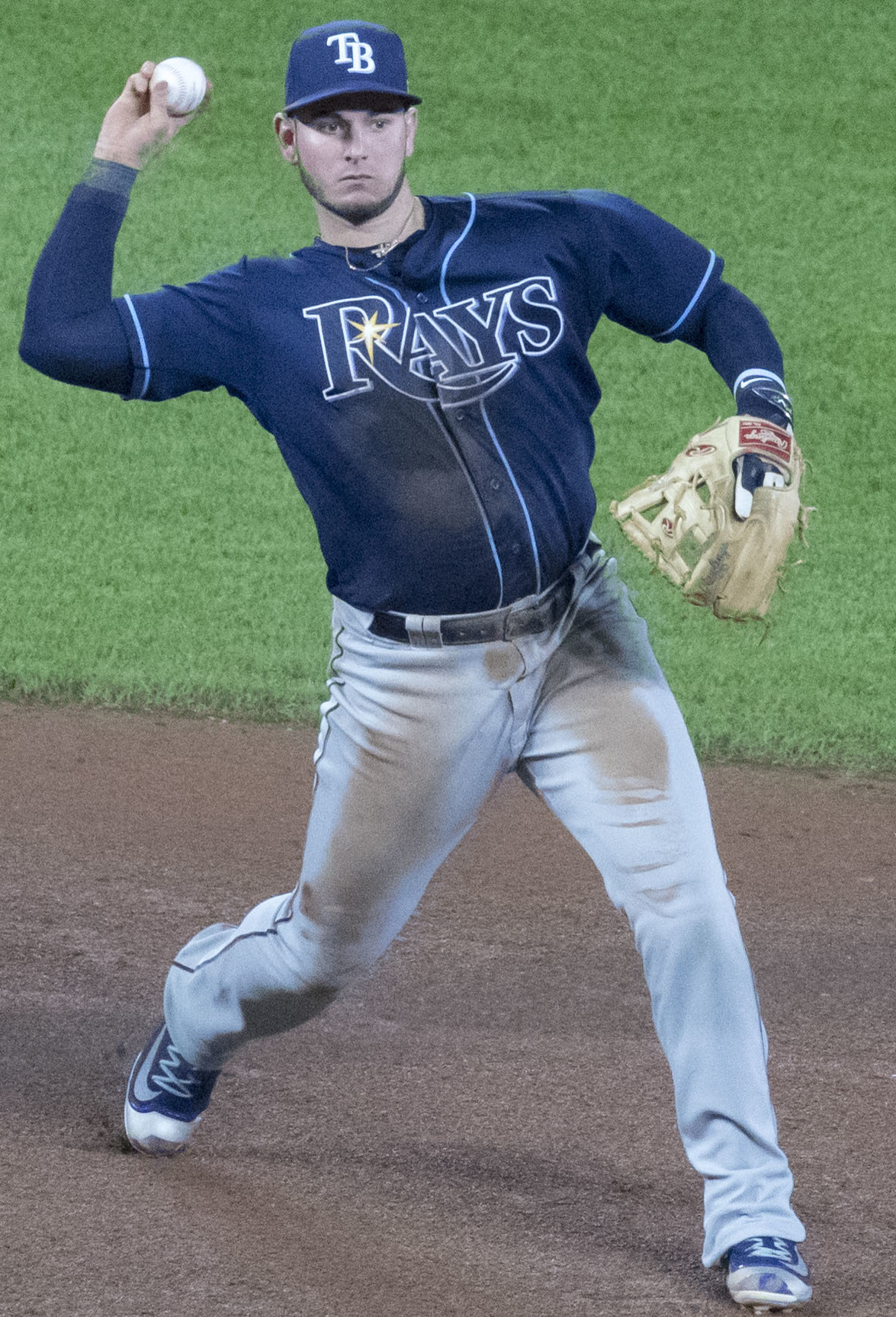
- Robertson with the Tampa Bay Rays in September 2017
- Infielder
- Born: March 22, 1994 (age 32); Upland, California, U.S.
- Batted: Right Threw: Right

MLB debut
- April 4, 2017, for the Tampa Bay Rays

Last MLB appearance
- July 4, 2021, for the Milwaukee Brewers

MLB statistics
- Batting average: .227
- Home runs: 18
- Runs batted in: 78
- Stats at Baseball Reference

Teams
- Tampa Bay Rays (2017–2019); San Francisco Giants (2020); Milwaukee Brewers (2021)

Daniel Ray Robertson (born March 22, 1994) is an American former professional baseball infielder. He was drafted by the Oakland Athletics in the first round of the 2012 Major League Baseball draft. He made his Major League Baseball (MLB) debut with the Tampa Bay Rays in 2017 and has also played for the San Francisco Giants and Milwaukee Brewers.

== Early life ==
Robertson attended Upland High School in Upland, California. He batted .380 as a sophomore in 2010, with two home runs, 11 doubles, 33 runs batted in (RBIs) and 24 runs. He batted .545 as a junior in 2011, with six home runs, eight doubles, 22 RBIs, and 21 runs, and was named first-team All-Baseline League. As a senior, he hit .560 with six home runs and 41 RBIs. He was the Baseline League MVP and the All-California Interscholastic Federation-SS. He committed to play college baseball at UCLA.

== Professional career ==
=== Oakland Athletics ===
Robertson was drafted by the Oakland Athletics in the first round with the 34th overall selection of the 2012 Major League Baseball draft. He made his professional debut that season for the Arizona League Athletics and also played for the Vermont Lake Monsters that season. He finished the year at .241/.330/.400 with five home runs and 30 RBIs over 55 games.

In 2013, he played for the Beloit Snappers. In 101 games, Robertson hit .277/.353/.401 with nine home runs and 46 RBIs. He was named an MILB.Com Organization All-Star.

Robertson played for the Stockton Ports in 2014 where he batted .310/.402/.471 with 15 home runs and 60 RBIs in 132 games, as he led the California League in hits (170) and doubles (37), was second in the league in runs (110) and hit by pitch (16), and was sixth in walks (72). He was named an MILB.Com Organization All-Star.

He played in the AFL for Mesa in 2014, batting .301/.398/.356, and was named a Rising Star, All-Prospect Team, and Player of the Week on October 28.

=== Tampa Bay Rays (2017–2019) ===
On January 10, 2015, Robertson was traded to the Tampa Bay Rays with John Jaso and Boog Powell in exchange for Yunel Escobar and Ben Zobrist. He attended major league spring training in 2015. In 2015 he played for the Montgomery Biscuits where he batted .274/.363/.415 with four home runs and 41 RBIs in 78 games, and was named an MILB.Com Organization All-Star.

In 2016 he played with the Durham Bulls where he hit .259/.358/.356 with five home runs and 43 RBIs in 118 games. The Rays added Robertson to their 40-man roster after the 2016 season.

==== 2017 season ====
Robertson made the Rays' opening day roster out of spring training. Rays manager Kevin Cash said that he was chosen due to his defensive capabilities, specifically at shortstop. On June 27, Robertson was optioned down to the Triple-A Durham Bulls to make a place for newly acquired shortstop Adeiny Hechavarria, but his option was voided and he was placed on the 10-Day DL with neck spasms. He was slashing .224/.314/.365 with 5 home runs in 58 games. On August 4, Robertson was activated off the DL He finished the year hitting .206/.308/.326 in 76 games, playing predominantly at second base (41 games), but also seeing 24 games at shortstop, 17 games at third base, and one game in left field.

==== 2018 season ====
Robertson started as the opening day second basemen with the plan to platoon with Brad Miller and Joey Wendle throughout the season. On April 22, he recorded his first career four-hit game. On June 25, Robertson made his first career start in left field in order for him and Joey Wendle to receive more playing time. On July 9, he hit his first career walk-off, a single, against Blaine Hardy of the Detroit Tigers in a 10–9 victory. On July 22, Robertson hit another walk-off, this time a grand slam, in a 6–4 win off of Kyle Barraclough of the Miami Marlins. This was the first walk-off grand slam in franchise history. Ninety minutes after the end of the game, Robertson made a surprise visit to a hospitalized teen. Robertson was moved by the experience, stating “Just to see the excitement and joy on his face when I walked in that room, it’s honestly something I’ll never forget."

On August 3, Robertson slid hard into second base, jamming his thumb in the process. He was forced to exit the game and undergo a series of MRIs, which determined that he would need to go on the disabled list with a sprained left thumb. It was announced that Robertson would need surgery and effectively end his season.

He finished the season hitting .262/.382/.415 with nine home runs and a 2.6 fWAR, the highest for his team at the time of his injury. Robertson was hit by pitches 13 times, fifth in the American League. Robertson once played 39 games at second base, 29 at shortstop, 19 at third base, four in left field, and one game each at first base and as a pitcher.

==== 2019 season ====
Robertson began the season on the Opening day roster, but was optioned on June 15 after struggling offensively. He was recalled later on but was put on the disabled list on June 22 with a knee injury. He ended the season batting .213/.312/.295 in 74 games. He played 43 games at third base, 26 at second base, 16 at shortstop, and pitched in one game.

==== 2020 season ====
On August 18, 2020, Robertson was designated for assignment by the Rays.

=== San Francisco Giants (2020) ===
On August 23, 2020, Robertson was traded by the Rays to the San Francisco Giants, in exchange for cash considerations or a player to be named later. In 13 games with San Francisco, he slashed .333/.417/.333. Robertson was non-tendered by the Giants on December 2, 2020.

=== Milwaukee Brewers (2021) ===
On January 12, 2021, Robertson signed a one-year, $900K contract with the Milwaukee Brewers. On July 7, Robertson was designated for assignment after hitting .164/.303/.274 with 2 home runs and 4 RBI in 50 games. He was outrighted to the Triple-A Nashville Sounds on July 13. Robertson became a free agent following the season.

=== Minnesota Twins ===
On February 7, 2022, Robertson signed a minor league contract with the Minnesota Twins. He appeared in 17 games for the Triple-A St. Paul Saints, posting a slash of .183/.279/.267 with one home run and 10 RBI.

=== Philadelphia Phillies ===
On June 20, 2022, the Twins traded Robertson to the Philadelphia Phillies for cash considerations. Robertson played in 41 contests for the Triple-A Lehigh Valley IronPigs, where he hit .220/.311/.404 with five home runs and 16 RBI. He elected free agency following the season on November 10.

=== Tampa Bay Rays (second stint) ===
On February 10, 2023, Robertson signed a minor league contract with the Tampa Bay Rays organization. Robertson was released by the Rays on March 29.

=== Atlanta Braves ===
On April 24, 2023, Robertson signed a minor league contract with the Atlanta Braves. In 54 games for the Triple–A Gwinnett Stripers, he batted .220/.337/.316 with 3 home runs and 20 RBI. On September 6, Robertson was released by the Braves organization.

== Personal life ==
Robertson and his three brothers were raised in Upland, California, by his parents, Don and Julie. In 2013, despite not being a smoker, Don died from lung cancer. Robertson has a tattoo on his upper right arm in tribute to his father. Robertson also has a charity called the Daniel Robertson Family Foundation. The foundation raises money to offset medical bills for cancer patients.

Robertson grew up a Los Angeles Angels fan.
