= Chaz Roe =

American baseball player (born 1986)

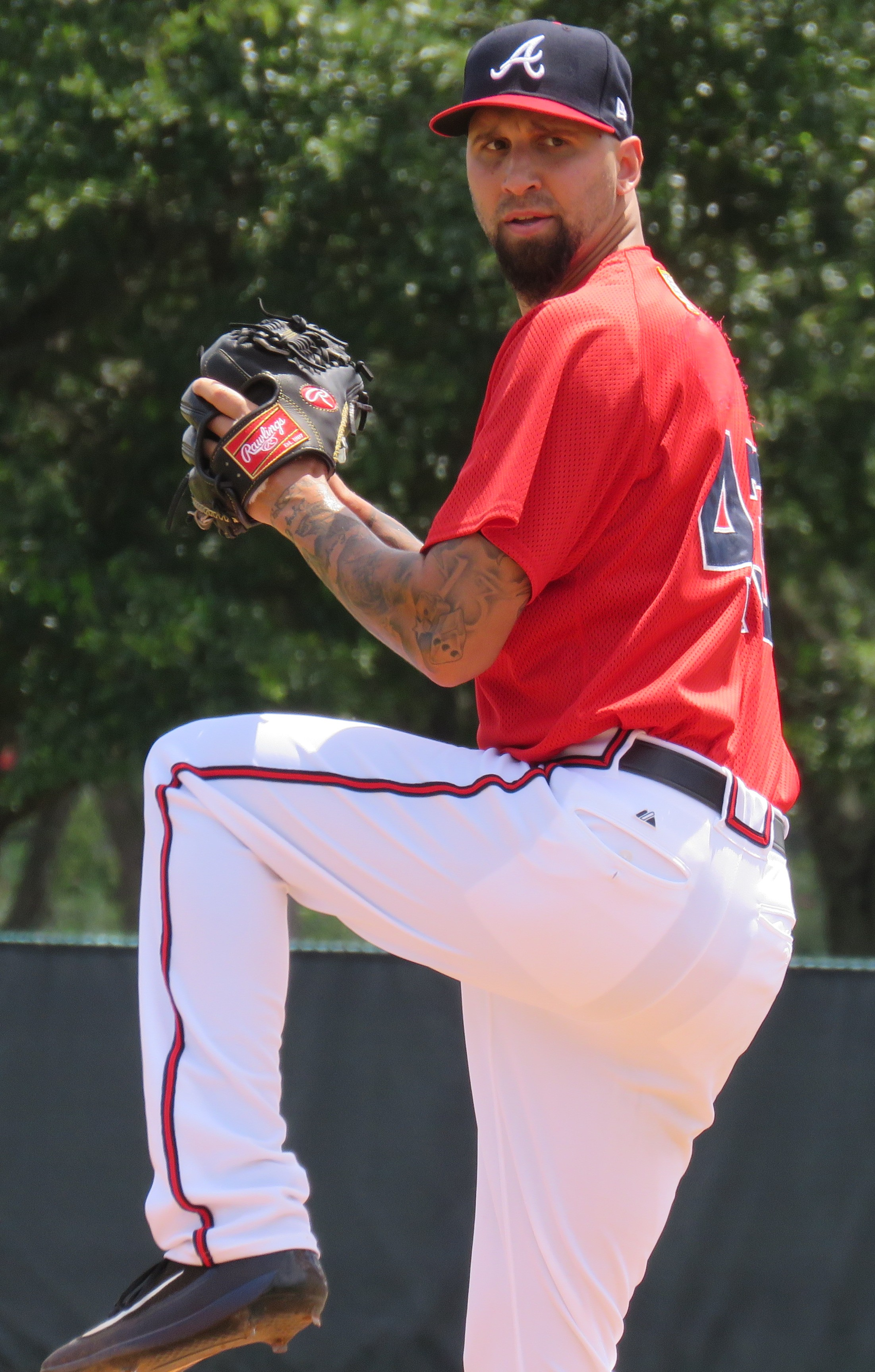
- Roe with the Atlanta Braves in 2017
- Pitcher
- Born: October 9, 1986 (age 39); Steubenville, Ohio, U.S.
- Batted: Right Threw: Right

MLB debut
- July 1, 2013, for the Arizona Diamondbacks

Last MLB appearance
- April 2, 2021, for the Tampa Bay Rays

MLB statistics
- Win–loss record: 11–8
- Earned run average: 3.89
- Strikeouts: 245
- Stats at Baseball Reference

Teams
- Arizona Diamondbacks (2013); New York Yankees (2014); Baltimore Orioles (2015–2016); Atlanta Braves (2016–2017); Tampa Bay Rays (2017–2021)

Chaz Daniel Roe (born October 9, 1986) is an American former professional baseball pitcher. He played in Major League Baseball (MLB) for the Arizona Diamondbacks, New York Yankees, Baltimore Orioles, Atlanta Braves, and Tampa Bay Rays.

== Career ==
Roe attended Lafayette High School in Lexington, Kentucky. In 2004 as a high school player, Roe was considered by Baseball America to be the number 35 prospect in the United States.

=== Colorado Rockies ===
Roe was selected by the Colorado Rockies in the first round (32nd overall) of the 2005 Major League Baseball draft. On September 3, 2010, Roe was called up to the majors for the first time. However, he did not appear in any games, temporarily making him a phantom ballplayer.

=== Seattle Mariners ===
On December 2, 2010, Roe was traded to the Seattle Mariners for José López. He was designated for assignment by Seattle on June 29, 2011, after recording a 6.41 ERA with Triple-A Tacoma. He cleared waivers and was sent outright to Triple-A Tacoma Rainiers on July 5. He elected free agency on November 2.

=== Laredo Lemurs ===
Roe signed with the Laredo Lemurs of the American Association of Independent Professional Baseball for the 2012 season. He pitched in 49 games for the Lemurs, pitching to a 1.47 ERA with 69 strikeouts in 55.0 innings.

=== Arizona Diamondbacks ===
On May 28, 2013, Roe signed a minor league contract for the 2013 season with the Arizona Diamondbacks. He made his MLB debut with the Diamondbacks on July 1. He was called up on August 24, 2013, to replace J.J. Putz Roe pitched to a 4.03 ERA in 22.1 innings with the Diamondbacks.

=== Texas Rangers ===
On November 1, 2013, Roe was claimed off waivers by the Texas Rangers He was designated for assignment on January 29, 2014. Roe elected free agency on February 5, 2014.

=== Miami Marlins ===
On February 6, 2014, Roe signed a minor league contract with the Miami Marlins organization that included an invitation to Spring Training.

=== New York Yankees ===
On August 31, 2014, The Marlins traded Roe to the New York Yankees for cash considerations. He had his contract selected to the major league roster on September 2. He was designated for assignment by the Yankees on September 21, 2014.

=== Pittsburgh Pirates ===
On September 24, 2014, Roe was claimed off waivers by the Pittsburgh Pirates. He was non-tendered and became a free agent on December 2.

=== Baltimore Orioles ===
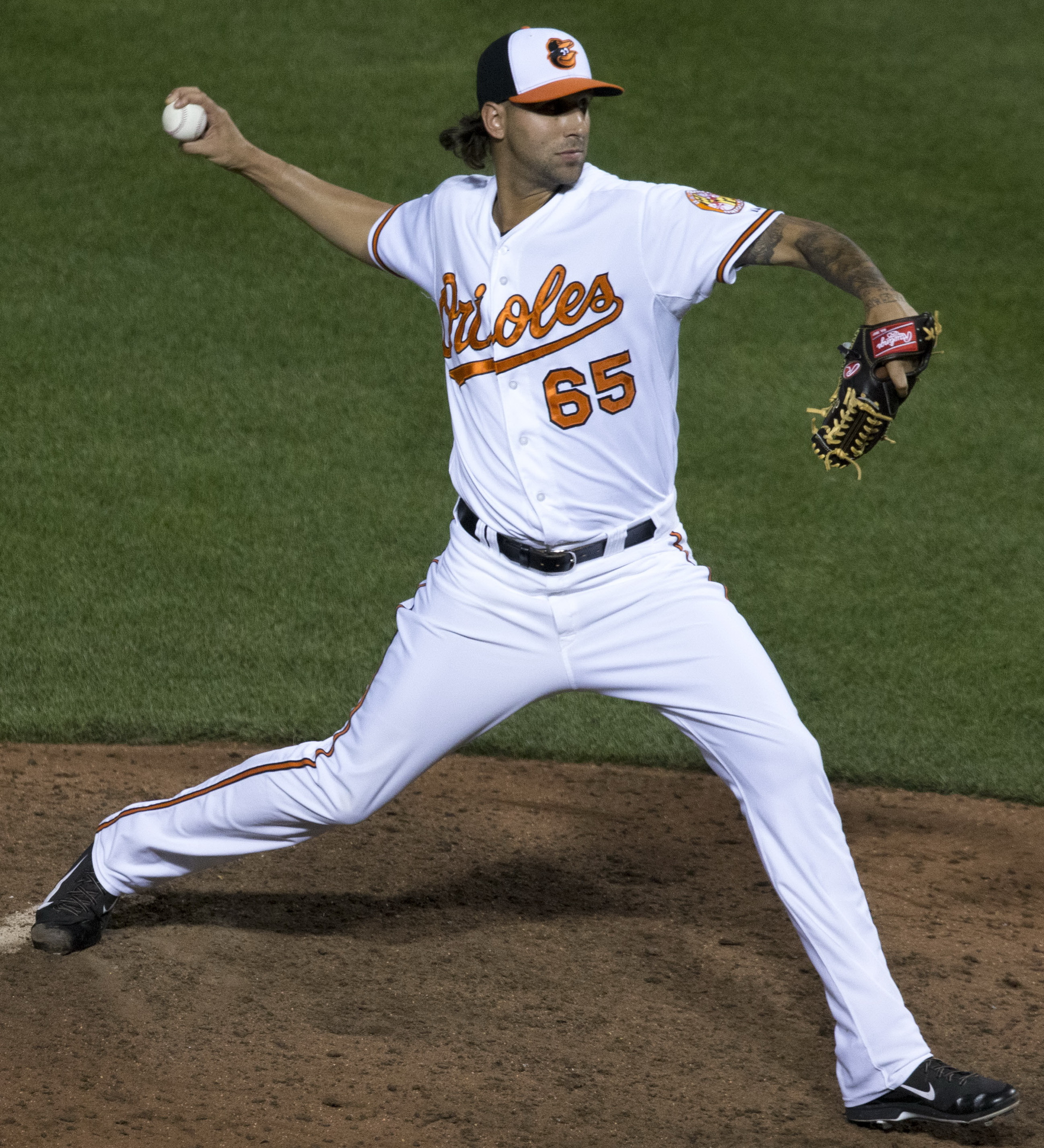
Roe while with the Baltimore Orioles

On December 15, 2014, Roe was signed to a minor league contract by the Baltimore Orioles. He had his contract selected to the major league roster on May 24. In 36 appearances for the Orioles in 2015, Roe pitched to a 4.14 ERA with 38 strikeouts in 41.1 innings of work.

He was sent outright to Triple-A Norfolk Tides on April 1, 2016. He had his contract selected back to the major league roster on June 30. On July 29, 2016, Roe was designated for assignment following the signing of Logan Ondrusek. At the time of his designation, Roe had allowed 4 runs in 9 2/3 innings, striking out 11 and walking 7.

=== Atlanta Braves ===
On August 7, 2016, Roe was claimed off waivers by the Atlanta Braves. In 21 games, he posted an ERA of 3.60 in 20 innings, striking out 26. On July 13, 2017, Roe was outrighted off of the 40-man roster and assigned to the Triple-A Gwinnett Braves.

=== Tampa Bay Rays ===
On July 18, 2017, Roe was traded to the Tampa Bay Rays for cash considerations and assigned to the Triple-A Durham Bulls. He was called up in September when rosters expanded. In 8 games, he posted an ERA of 1.07 in 8 2/3 innings. He struck out 12. The following season, he opened the season in the Rays bullpen. On July 8, he was placed on the disabled list. Roe finished with career highs all over the board, posting an ERA of 3.58 in 61 appearances. In 2019, Roe continued to be a mainstay in the Rays bullpen, appearing in a career high 71 games and recording 65 strikeouts in 51 innings. In 2020, Roe pitched to a 2.89 ERA with 9 strikeouts in 9.1 innings pitched. On October 31, 2020, Roe was outrighted off of the 40-man roster and elected free agency.

On February 21, 2021, Roe re-signed with the Rays on a one-year, $1.15MM contract. After pitching on April 2 against the Miami Marlins, Roe reported discomfort. He was placed on the 10-day injured list with a left shoulder strain with the expectation that he would miss at least twelve weeks of the season. He was later placed on the 60-day injured list on April 6. On June 30, 2021, Roe underwent season–ending surgery on his shoulder.

== Post-playing career ==
In August 2023, Roe joined Concierge Real Estate & Investment Co. as the Director of Note Originations.

== Awards and honors ==
- 2008 Texas League Pitcher of the Week
- 2007 California League Pitcher of the Week
- 2005 Pioneer League Post-Season All-Star
