= 2018 Texas Rangers season =

2018 Texas Rangers
- League: American League
- Division: West
- Ballpark: Globe Life Park in Arlington
- City: Arlington
- Record: 67–95 (.414)
- Divisional place: 5th
- Owners: Ray Davis & Bob R. Simpson
- Managers: Jeff Banister (through September 19); Don Wakamatsu (from September 21)
- Television: Fox Sports Southwest (Dave Raymond, C.J. Nitkowski, Tom Grieve)
- Radio: KRLD 105.3 FM (English) (Eric Nadel, Matt Hicks, Dave Raymond); KZMP 1540 AM (Spanish) (Eleno Orlenas, Jerry Romo)
- Stats: ESPN.com; Baseball Reference

The 2018 Texas Rangers season was the 58th of the Texas Rangers franchise overall, their 47th in Arlington as the Rangers, and their 25th season at Globe Life Park in Arlington. The Rangers began the season on March 29 against the Houston Astros and finished the season on September 30 against the Seattle Mariners.

The Rangers completed a 5–4 triple play in their 8–6 win over the Los Angeles Angels on August 16. It was only the third 5–4 triple play in the expansion era (since 1961). It was also the first triple play since 1912 in which the batter was not retired. The Rangers set a new club record with 13 extra-base hits in a game against the Minnesota Twins on September 2.

On September 21, the Rangers fired Jeff Banister as manager following much speculation. Bench coach Don Wakamatsu was promoted to interim manager for the final 10 games of the season.

== Opening Day lineup ==
3	Delino DeShields	CF
13	Joey Gallo	1B
1	Elvis Andrus	SS
29	Adrián Beltré	3B
30	Nomar Mazara	RF
17	Shin-Soo Choo	DH
61	Robinson Chirinos	C
12	Rougned Odor	2B
16	Ryan Rua	LF
35	Cole Hamels	P

== Standings ==
=== American League West ===
AL West
Team	W	L	Pct.	GB	Home	Road
Houston Astros	103	59	.636	—	46‍–‍35	57‍–‍24
Oakland Athletics	97	65	.599	6	50‍–‍31	47‍–‍34
Seattle Mariners	89	73	.549	14	45‍–‍36	44‍–‍37
Los Angeles Angels	80	82	.494	23	42‍–‍39	38‍–‍43
Texas Rangers	67	95	.414	36	34‍–‍47	33‍–‍48

=== American League Wild Card ===
Division leaders
Team	W	L	Pct.
Boston Red Sox	108	54	.667
Houston Astros	103	59	.636
Cleveland Indians	91	71	.562

Wild Card teams (Top 2 teams qualify for postseason)
Team	W	L	Pct.	GB
New York Yankees	100	62	.617	+3
Oakland Athletics	97	65	.599	—
Tampa Bay Rays	90	72	.556	7
Seattle Mariners	89	73	.549	8
Los Angeles Angels	80	82	.494	17
Minnesota Twins	78	84	.481	19
Toronto Blue Jays	73	89	.451	24
Texas Rangers	67	95	.414	30
Detroit Tigers	64	98	.395	33
Chicago White Sox	62	100	.383	35
Kansas City Royals	58	104	.358	39
Baltimore Orioles	47	115	.290	50

=== Record against opponents ===
2018 American League record Source: MLB Standings Grid – 2018
Team	BAL	BOS	CWS	CLE	DET	HOU	KC	LAA	MIN	NYY	OAK	SEA	TB	TEX	TOR	NL
Baltimore	—	3–16	3–4	2–5	2–4	1–6	2–4	1–5	1–6	7–12	1–5	1–6	8–11	3–4	5–14	7–13
Boston	16–3	—	3–4	3–4	4–2	3–4	5–1	6–0	4–3	10–9	2–4	4–3	11–8	6–1	15–4	16–4
Chicago	4–3	4–3	—	5–14	7–12	0–7	11–8	2–5	7–12	2–4	2–5	2–4	4–2	4–3	2–4	6–14
Cleveland	5–2	4–3	14–5	—	13–6	3–4	12–7	3–3	10–9	2–5	2–4	2–5	2–4	4–2	3–4	12–8
Detroit	4–2	2–4	12–7	6–13	—	1–5	8–11	3–4	7–12	3–4	0–7	3–4	2–4	3–4	4–3	6–14
Houston	6–1	4–3	7–0	4–3	5–1	—	5–1	13–6	4–2	2–5	12–7	9–10	3–4	12–7	4–2	13–7
Kansas City	4–2	1–5	8–11	7–12	11–8	1–5	—	1–6	10–9	2–5	2–5	1–5	0–7	2–5	2–5	6–14
Los Angeles	5–1	0–6	5–2	3–3	4–3	6–13	6–1	—	4–3	1–5	10–9	8–11	1–6	13–6	4–3	10–10
Minnesota	6–1	3–4	12–7	9–10	12–7	2–4	9–10	3–4	—	2–5	2–5	1–5	3–4	2–4	4–2	8–12
New York	12–7	9–10	4–2	5–2	4–3	5–2	5–2	5–1	5–2	—	3–3	5–1	10–9	4–3	13–6	11–9
Oakland	5–1	4–2	5–2	4–2	7–0	7–12	5–2	9–10	5–2	3–3	—	9–10	2–5	13–6	7–0	12–8
Seattle	6–1	3–4	4–2	5–2	4–3	10–9	5–1	11–8	5–1	1–5	10–9	—	6–1	10–9	3–4	6–14
Tampa Bay	11–8	8–11	2–4	4–2	4–2	4–3	7–0	6–1	4–3	9–10	5–2	1–6	—	5–1	13–6	7–13
Texas	4–3	1–6	3–4	2–4	4–3	7–12	5–2	6–13	4–2	3–4	6–13	9–10	1–5	—	3–3	9–11
Toronto	14–5	4–15	4–2	4–3	3–4	2–4	5–2	3–4	2–4	6–13	0–7	4–3	6–13	3–3	—	13–7

== Game log ==
2018 Game Log 67–95 (Home: 34–47; Away: 33–48)
March: 1–2 (Home: 1–2; Away: 0–0)

#	Date	Opponent	Score	Win	Loss	Save	Attendance	Record	Streak
1	March 29	Astros	1–4	Verlander (1–0)	Hamels (0–1)	—	47,253	0–1	L1
2	March 30	Astros	5–1	Fister (1–0)	Keuchel (0–1)	—	35,469	1–1	W1
3	March 31	Astros	3–9	McCullers (1–0)	Moore (0–1)	—	36,892	1–2	L1

April: 10–17 (Home: 3–10; Away: 7–7)

#	Date	Opponent	Score	Win	Loss	Save	Attendance	Record	Streak
4	April 1	Astros	2–8	Cole (1–0)	Minor (0–1)	—	26,758	1–3	L2
5	April 2	@ Athletics	1–3	Hatcher (2–0)	Jepsen (0–1)	Treinen (1)	7,416	1–4	L3
6	April 3	@ Athletics	4–1	Hamels (1–1)	Graveman (0–1)	Kela (1)	9,157	2–4	W1
7	April 4	@ Athletics	2–6	Manaea (1–1)	Fister (1–1)	—	7,908	2–5	L1
8	April 5	@ Athletics	6–3	Pérez (1–0)	Mengden (0–2)	Kela (2)	10,132	3–5	W1
9	April 6	Blue Jays	5–8	Estrada (1–0)	Moore (0–2)	Osuna (3)	21,670	3–6	L1
10	April 7	Blue Jays	5–1	Minor (1–1)	Stroman (0–1)	—	26,229	4–6	W1
11	April 8	Blue Jays	4–7	García (1–0)	Hamels (1–2)	Osuna (4)	26.902	4–7	L1
12	April 9	Angels	3–8	Álvarez (1–0)	Fister (1–2)	—	16,718	4–8	L2
13	April 10	Angels	1–11	Skaggs (2–0)	Pérez (1–1)	—	18,697	4–9	L3
14	April 11	Angels	2–7	Barría (1–0)	Moore (0–3)	Middleton (2)	20,363	4–10	L4
15	April 13	@ Astros	2–3	Smith (1–0)	Jepsen (0–2)	—	32,129	4–11	L5
16	April 14	@ Astros	6–5 (10)	Kela (1–0)	Harris (0–1)	Claudio (1)	40,679	5–11	W1
17	April 15	@ Astros	3–1 (10)	Kela (2–0)	Rondon (1–1)	Diekman (1)	31,803	6–11	W2
18	April 16	@ Rays	4–8	Snell (2–1)	Pérez (1–2)	—	9,363	6–12	L1
19	April 17	@ Rays	7–2	Moore (1–3)	Chirinos (0–1)	—	8,972	7–12	W1
20	April 18	@ Rays	2–4	Faria (1–1)	Hamels (1–3)	Colomé (4)	8,657	7–13	L1
21	April 20	Mariners	2–6	Nicasio (1–0)	Kela (2–1)	—	27,811	7–14	L2
22	April 21	Mariners	7–9	Bradford (2–0)	Claudio (0–1)	Diaz (8)	39,016	7–15	L3
23	April 22	Mariners	7–4	Pérez (2–2)	Ramirez (0–1)	Kela (3)	33,661	8–15	W1
24	April 23	Athletics	4–9	Buchter (1–0)	Jepsen (0–3)	—	17,060	8–16	L1
25	April 24	Athletics	2–3	Triggs (2–0)	Hamels (1–4)	Casilla (1)	19,391	8–17	L2
26	April 25	Athletics	4–2	Chavez (1–0)	Graveman (0–5)	Kela (4)	19,121	9–17	W1
27	April 27	@ Blue Jays	6–4	Minor (2–1)	Stroman (0–3)	Kela (5)	26,312	10–17	W2
28	April 28	@ Blue Jays	7–4	Colón (1–0)	García (2–2)	Kela (6)	39,176	11–17	W3
29	April 29	@ Blue Jays	2–7	Happ (4–1)	Pérez (2–3)	—	31,669	11–18	L1
30	April 30	@ Indians	5–7	Allen (2–0)	Martin (0–1)	Beliveau (1)	12,851	11–19	L2

May: 13–16 (Home: 7–7; Away: 6–9)

#	Date	Opponent	Score	Win	Loss	Save	Attendance	Record	Streak
31	May 1	@ Indians	8–6 (12)	Claudio (1–1)	Goody (0–2)	—	16,356	12–19	W1
32	May 2	@ Indians	4–12	Kluber (5–1)	Moore (1–4)	—	15,637	12–20	L1
33	May 3	Red Sox	11–5	Minor (3–1)	Price (2–4)	—	22,348	13–20	W1
34	May 4	Red Sox	1–5	Porcello (5–0)	Colón (1–1)	—	31,404	13–21	L1
35	May 5	Red Sox	5–6	Kelly (1–0)	Kela (2–2)	Kimbrel (9)	35,728	13–22	L2
36	May 6	Red Sox	1–6	Sale (3–1)	Fister (1–3)	—	28,360	13–23	L3
37	May 7	Tigers	7–6	Leclerc (1–0)	Stumpf (1–2)	Kela (7)	20,057	14–23	W1
38	May 8	Tigers	4–7	Fiers (3–2)	Minor (3–2)	Greene (7)	18,634	14–24	L1
39	May 9	Tigers	5–4 (10)	Kela (3–2)	Saupold (1–1)	—	30,387	15–24	W1
40	May 11	@ Astros	1–0	Hamels (2–4)	Verlander (4–2)	Kela (8)	34,297	16–24	W2
41	May 12	@ Astros	1–6	Morton (5-0)	Fister (1-4)	—	36,482	16–25	L1
42	May 13	@ Astros	1–6	Keuchel (3–5)	Moore (1–5)	—	39,405	16–26	L2
43	May 15	@ Mariners	8–9 (11)	Goeddel (2–0)	Claudio (1–2)	—	14,670	16–27	L3
44	May 16	@ Mariners	5–1	Colón (2–1)	Pazos (1–1)	—	20,629	17–27	W1
45	May 17	@ White Sox	2–4	Avilán (1–0)	Leclerc (1–1)	Jones (2)	17,666	17–28	L1
46	May 18	@ White Sox	12–5	Chavez (2–0)	Fulmer (2–4)	—	16,373	18–28	W1
47	May 19	@ White Sox	3–5	Giolito (3–4)	Jurado (0–1)	Jones (3)	25,611	18–29	L1
48	May 20	@ White Sox	0–3	Lopez (1–3)	Minor (3–3)	Fry (1)	16,829	18–30	L2
49	May 21	Yankees	5–10	Tanaka (5–2)	Colón (2–2)	—	29,553	18–31	L3
50	May 22	Yankees	6–4	Hamels (3–4)	German (0–2)	Kela (9)	30,325	19–31	W1
51	May 23	Yankees	12–10	Claudio (2–2)	Robertson (3–2)	Kela (10)	31,304	20–31	W2
52	May 24	Royals	2–8	Duffy (2–6)	Bibens-Dirkx (0–1)	—	23,230	20–32	L1
53	May 25	Royals	8–4	Minor (4–3)	Skoglund (1–5)	Kela (11)	35,105	21–32	W1
54	May 26	Royals	4–3 (10)	Claudio (3–2)	McCarthy (3–2)	—	29,644	22–32	W2
55	May 27	Royals	3–5	Hammel (2–5)	Hamels (3–5)	Herrera (11)	31,898	22–33	L1
56	May 28	@ Mariners	1–2	Gonzales (5–3)	Fister (1–5)	Diaz (19)	26,236	22–34	L2
57	May 29	@ Mariners	9–5	Claudio (4–2)	Díaz (0–2)	—	13,259	23–34	W1
58	May 30	@ Mariners	7–6	Barnette (1–0)	Rzepczynski (0–1)	Kela (12)	13,070	24–34	W2
59	May 31	@ Mariners	1–6	LeBlanc (1–0)	Minor (4–4)	—	15,630	24–35	L1

June: 14–11 (Home: 8–6; Away: 6–5)

#	Date	Opponent	Score	Win	Loss	Save	Attendance	Record	Streak
60	June 1	@ Angels	0–6	Barria (5–1)	Colón (2–3)	—	33,511	24–36	L2
61	June 2	@ Angels	3–2 (10)	Diekman (1–0)	Álvarez (2–2)	Kela (13)	44,603	25–36	W1
62	June 3	@ Angels	1–3	Skaggs (4–4)	Fister (1–6)	Anderson (2)	33,541	25–37	L1
63	June 5	Athletics	7–4	Martin (1–1)	Trivino (3–1)	Kela (14)	19,470	26–37	W1
64	June 6	Athletics	8–2	Colón (3–3)	Mengden (6–5)	—	22,335	27–37	W2
65	June 7	Astros	2–5	Cole (7–1)	Hamels (3–6)	—	30,236	27–38	L1
66	June 8	Astros	3–7	Verlander (8–2)	Fister (1–7)	—	31,722	27–39	L2
67	June 9	Astros	3–4	Sipp (1–0)	Leclerc (1–2)	Rondon (2)	38,068	27–40	L3
68	June 10	Astros	7–8	Harris (2–3)	Kela (3–3)	Rondon (3)	30,251	27–41	L4
69	June 12	@ Dodgers	5–12	Paredes (1–0)	Colón (3–4)	Corcino (1)	48,233	27–42	L5
70	June 13	@ Dodgers	2–3	Liberatore (2–1)	Chavez (2–1)	—	41,303	27–43	L6
71	June 15	Rockies	5–9	Bettis (5–1)	Mendez (0–1)	—	30,448	27–44	L7
72	June 16	Rockies	5–2	Leclerc (2–2)	Musgrave (0–2)	Kela (15)	23,468	28–44	W1
73	June 17	Rockies	13–12	Chavez (3–1)	Davis (0–2)	—	25,513	29–44	W2
74	June 18	@ Royals	6–3	Colón (4–4)	Kennedy (1–7)	Kela (16)	18,319	30–44	W3
75	June 19	@ Royals	4–1	Hamels (4–6)	Hammel (2–8)	Kela (17)	17,789	31–44	W4
76	June 20	@ Royals	3–2	Bibens-Dirkx (1–1)	Junis (5–8)	Diekman (2)	19,489	32–44	W5
77	June 22	@ Twins	8–1	Minor (5–4)	Romero (3–3)	Chavez (1)	28,004	33–44	W6
78	June 23	@ Twins	9–6	Gallardo (1–0)	Odorizzi (3–5)	Kela (18)	23,230	34–44	W7
79	June 24	@ Twins	0–2	Berríos (8–5)	Colón (4–5)	Rodney (17)	23,633	34–45	L1
80	June 25	Padres	7–4	Barnette (2–0)	Stammen (4–1)	Kela (19)	23,470	35–45	W1
81	June 26	Padres	2–3	Strahm (2–2)	Diekman (1–1)	Hand (22)	21,780	35–46	L1
82	June 27	Padres	5–2	Minor (6–4)	Richard (7–7)	Kela (20)	21,365	36–46	W1
83	June 29	White Sox	11–3	Gallardo (2–0)	Covey (3–3)	—	28,156	37–46	W2
84	June 30	White Sox	13–4	Colón (5–5)	Rodon (1–3)	—	28,138	38–46	W3

July: 8–17 (Home: 1–9; Away: 7–8)

#	Date	Opponent	Score	Win	Loss	Save	Attendance	Record	Streak
85	July 1	White Sox	5–10	López (4–5)	Hamels (4–7)	Soria (12)	22,684	38–47	L1
86	July 3	Astros	3–5	Keuchel (5–8)	Bibens-Dirkx (1–2)	Rondón (6)	40,165	38–48	L2
87	July 4	Astros	4–5 (10)	McHugh (4–0)	Martin (1–2)	Giles (12)	43,592	38–49	L3
88	July 5	@ Tigers	7–5	Gallardo (3–0)	Boyd (4–7)	Kela (21)	21,248	39–49	W1
89	July 6	@ Tigers	1–3	Zimmermann (4–0)	Colón (5–6)	Jiménez (3)	27,316	39–50	L1
90	July 7	@ Tigers	2–7	Fiers (6–5)	Hamels (4–8)	—	29,174	39–51	L2
91	July 8	@ Tigers	3–0	Bibens-Dirkx (2–2)	Fulmer (3–8)	Kela (22)	22,047	40–51	W1
92	July 9	@ Red Sox	0–5	Rodríguez (11–3)	Minor (6–5)	—	36,754	40–52	L1
93	July 10	@ Red Sox	4–8	Barnes (3–2)	Gallardo (3–1)	—	36,883	40–53	L2
94	July 11	@ Red Sox	2–4	Sale (10–4)	Colón (5–7)	Kimbrel (28)	36,920	40–54	L3
95	July 13	@ Orioles	5–4	Hamels (5–8)	Cobb (2–12)	Kela (23)	17,348	41–54	W1
96	July 14	@ Orioles	0–1	Brach (1–2)	Pérez (2–4)	Britton (3)	38,328	41–55	L1
97	July 15	@ Orioles	5–6	Scott (1–1)	Minor (6–6)	Britton (4)	18,754	41–56	L2
89th All-Star Game in Washington, D.C.
98	July 20	Indians	8–9 (11)	McAllister (1–2)	Moore (1–6)	Otero (1)	28,253	41–57	L3
99	July 21	Indians	3–16	Carrasco (12–3)	Colón (5–8)	—	31,532	41–58	L4
100	July 22	Indians	5–0	Gallardo (4–1)	Clevinger (7–6)	—	21,829	42–58	W1
101	July 23	Athletics	3–15	Anderson (2–2)	Hamels (5–9)	—	18,744	42–59	L1
102	July 24	Athletics	10–13 (10)	Familia (6–4)	Bibens-Dirkx (2–3)	Treinen (25)	18,249	42–60	L2
103	July 25	Athletics	5–6	Trivino (8–1)	Leclerc (2–3)	Treinen (26)	20,549	42–61	L3
104	July 26	Athletics	6–7	Cahill (2–2)	Colón (5–9)	Treinen (27)	20,533	42–62	L4
105	July 27	@ Astros	11–2	Gallardo (5–1)	Keuchel (8–9)	—	42,592	43–62	W1
106	July 28	@ Astros	7–3	Jurado (1–1)	Verlander (10–6)	—	43,093	44–62	W2
107	July 29	@ Astros	4–3	Minor (7–6)	McCullers (10–6)	Kela (24)	40,560	45–62	W3
108	July 30	@ Dbacks	9–5	Butler (2–1)	Andriese (3–5)	—	20,639	46–62	W4
109	July 31	@ Dbacks	0–6	Godley (12–6)	Colón (5–10)	—	21,877	46–63	L1

August: 12–14 (Home: 9–7; Away: 3–7)

#	Date	Opponent	Score	Win	Loss	Save	Attendance	Record	Streak
110	August 2	Orioles	17–8	Gallardo (6–1)	Cashner (3–10)	Butler (1)	19,367	47–63	W1
111	August 3	Orioles	11–3	Jurado (2–1)	Hess (2–6)	—	22,544	48–63	W2
112	August 4	Orioles	3–1	Minor (8–6)	Bundy (7–10)	Leclerc (1)	24,300	49–63	W3
113	August 5	Orioles	6–9	Scott (2–2)	Hutchison (1–2)	Givens (2)	19,961	49–64	L1
114	August 6	Mariners	3–4 (12)	Tuivailala (4–3)	Butler (2–2)	Díaz (42)	17,759	49–65	L2
115	August 7	Mariners	11–4	Colón (6–10)	Hernandez (8–10)	—	17,575	50–65	W1
116	August 8	Mariners	11–7	Gallardo (7–1)	Gonzales (12–7)	—	20,116	51–65	W2
117	August 9	@ Yankees	3–7	Happ (12–6)	Jurado (2–2)	—	43,455	51–66	L1
118	August 10	@ Yankees	12–7	Minor (9–6)	Tanaka (9–3)	—	45,198	52–66	W1
119	August 11	@ Yankees	3–5	Betances (3–3)	Martin (1–3)	Chapman (30)	45,933	52–67	L1
120	August 12	@ Yankees	2–7	Sabathia (7–4)	Pérez (2–5)	—	41,304	52–68	L2
121	August 13	Dbacks	5–3	Colón (7–10)	Greinke (12–8)	Leclerc (2)	18,204	53–68	W1
122	August 14	Dbacks	4–6	Corbin (10–4)	Gallardo (7–2)	Boxberger (27)	19,353	53–69	L1
123	August 16	Angels	8–6	Moore (2–6)	Anderson (3–3)	Leclerc (3)	18,398	54–69	W1
124	August 17	Angels	6–4	Hutchison (2–2)	Despaigne (2–1)	Leclerc (4)	27,816	55–69	W2
125	August 18	Angels	7–11	Bedrosian (5–2)	Butler (2–3)	—	24,768	55–70	L1
126	August 19	Angels	4–2	Moore (3–6)	Ramirez (4–4)	Leclerc (5)	26,681	56–70	W1
127	August 20	@ Athletics	0–9	Fiers (9–6)	Colón (7–11)	—	9,341	56–71	L1
128	August 21	@ Athletics	0–6	Anderson (3–3)	Jurado (2–3)	—	11,579	56–72	L2
129	August 22	@ Athletics	4–2	Minor (10–6)	Jackson (4–3)	Leclerc (6)	13,139	57–72	W1
130	August 24	@ Giants	7–6 (10)	Gearrin (2–1)	Dyson (3–3)	Leclerc (7)	39,845	58–72	W2
131	August 25	@ Giants	3–5	Suarez (5–9)	Pérez (2–6)	Melancon (2)	40,287	58–73	L1
132	August 26	@ Giants	1–3	Holland (7–8)	Gallardo (7–3)	Melancon (3)	39,260	58–74	L2
133	August 28	Dodgers	4–8	Ferguson (5–2)	Jurado (2–4)	—	30,123	58–75	L3
134	August 29	Dodgers	1–3	Wood (8–6)	Minor (10–7)	Maeda (1)	29,181	58–76	L4
135	August 31	Twins	7–10	Magill (3–2)	Moore (3–7)	—	22,808	58–77	L5

September: 9–18 (Home: 5–6; Away: 4–12)

#	Date	Opponent	Score	Win	Loss	Save	Attendance	Record	Streak
136	September 1	Twins	7–4	Gallardo (8–3)	Berríos (11–10)	Leclerc (8)	32,175	59–77	W1
137	September 2	Twins	18–4	Méndez (1–1)	Moya (3–1)	Butler (2)	23,423	60–77	W2
138	September 3	Angels	1–3	Cole (1–2)	Curtis (0–1)	Parker (14)	21,048	60–78	L1
139	September 4	Angels	4–2	Minor (11–7)	Heaney (8–9)	Leclerc (9)	17,625	61–78	W1
140	September 5	Angels	3–9	Barría (10–8)	Colón (7–12)	—	19,966	61–79	L1
141	September 7	@ Athletics	4–8	Petit (7–3)	Gallardo (8–4)	—	15,572	61–80	L2
142	September 8	@ Athletics	6–8	Buchter (4–0)	Martin (1–4)	Treinen (37)	20,504	61–81	L3
143	September 9	@ Athletics	3–7	Kelley (2–0)	Jurado (2–5)	—	27,932	61–82	L4
144	September 10	@ Angels	5–2	Minor (12–7)	Barria (10–9)	Leclerc (10)	32,891	62–82	W1
145	September 11	@ Angels	0–1	Ramirez (5–5)	Sampson (0–1)	Buttrey (2)	33,756	62–83	L1
146	September 12	@ Angels	1–8	Peña (3–4)	Gallardo (8–5)	—	33,028	62–84	L2
147	September 14	@ Padres	4–0	Méndez (2–1)	Erlin (3–7)	—	22,740	63–84	W1
148	September 15	@ Padres	6–3	Jurado (3–5)	Castillo (2–3)	Leclerc (11)	28,833	64–84	W2
149	September 16	@ Padres	3–7	Yates (5–3)	Springs (0–1)	—	22,242	64–85	L1
150	September 17	Rays	0–3	Glasnow (2–6)	Sampson (0–2)	Romo (22)	21,840	64–86	L2
151	September 18	Rays	0–4	Snell (20–5)	Gallardo (8–6)	—	23,523	64–87	L3
152	September 19	Rays	3–9	Yarbrough (15–5)	Méndez (2–2)	—	25,168	64–88	L4
153	September 21	Mariners	8–3 (7)	Jurado (4–5)	Ramírez (2–4)	—	29,420	65–88	W1
154	September 22	Mariners	0–13	Gonzales (13–9)	Minor (12–8)	—	31,158	65–89	L1
155	September 23	Mariners	6–1	Springs (1–1)	LeBlanc (8–5)	—	31,269	66–89	W1
156	September 24	@ Angels	4–5 (11)	Cole (3–2)	Moore (3–8)	—	29,052	66–90	L1
157	September 25	@ Angels	1–4	Ramirez (7–5)	Gallardo (8–7)	Robles (1)	36,308	66–91	L2
158	September 26	@ Angels	2–3	Álvarez (6–4)	Martin (1–5)	Johnson (2)	35,991	66–92	L3
159	September 27	@ Mariners	2–0	Jurado (5–5)	Duke (5–5)	Leclerc (12)	15,799	67–92	W1
160	September 28	@ Mariners	6–12	LeBlanc (9–5)	Pérez (2–7)	—	23,598	67–93	L1
161	September 29	@ Mariners	1–4	Paxton (12–6)	Sampson (0–3)	Díaz (57)	31,780	67–94	L2
162	September 30	@ Mariners	1–3	Elías (3–1)	Gallardo (8–8)	Armstrong (1)	21,146	67–95	L3

=== Detailed records ===
American League
Opponent	Home	Away	Total	Pct.	Runs scored	Runs allowed
AL East
Baltimore Orioles	3–1	1–2	4–3	.571	47	32
Boston Red Sox	1–3	0–3	1–6	.143	24	39
New York Yankees	2–1	1–3	3–4	.429	38	38
Tampa Bay Rays	0–3	1–2	1–5	.167	16	30
Toronto Blue Jays	1–2	2–1	3–3	.500	29	31
	7–9	5–12	12–21	.364	154	170
AL Central
Chicago White Sox	2–1	1–3	3–4	.429	46	34
Cleveland Indians	1–2	1–2	2–4	.333	33	50
Detroit Tigers	2–1	2–2	4–3	.571	29	32
Kansas City Royals	2–2	3–0	5–2	.714	30	26
Minnesota Twins	2–1	2–1	4–2	.667	49	27
	9–7	9–8	18–15	.545	187	169
AL West
Houston Astros	1–9	6–3	7–12	.368	72	85
Los Angeles Angels	4–5	2–8	6–13	.316	53	87
Oakland Athletics	3–6	3–7	6–13	.316	79	114
Seattle Mariners	5–4	4–6	9–10	.474	96	99
Texas Rangers	—	—	—	—	—	—
	13–24	15–24	28–48	.368	300	385

National League
Opponent	Home	Away	Total	Pct.	Runs scored	Runs allowed
Arizona Diamondbacks	1–1	1–1	2–2	.500	18	20
Colorado Rockies	2–1	0–0	2–1	.667	23	23
Los Angeles Dodgers	0–2	0–2	0–4	.000	12	26
San Diego Padres	2–1	2–1	4–2	.667	27	19
San Francisco Giants	0–0	1–2	1–2	.333	11	14
	5–5	4–6	9–11	.450	91	102

== Roster ==
2018 Texas Rangers
Roster
Pitchers: 43 Tony Barnette; 56 Austin Bibens-Dirkx; 51 Matt Bush; 32 Eddie Butler; 53 Jesse Chavez; 58 Alex Claudio; 40 Bartolo Colón; 50 Zac Curtis; 41 Jake Diekman; 38 Doug Fister; 49 Yovani Gallardo; 45 Nick Gardewine; 44 Cory Gearrin; 35 Cole Hamels; 48 Drew Hutchison; 32 Kevin Jepsen; 57 Ariel Jurado; 50 Keone Kela; 62 José Leclerc; 44,52 Brandon Mann; 31 Chris Martin; 65 Yohander Méndez; 36 Mike Minor; 55 Matt Moore; 64 C. D. Pelham; 33 Martín Pérez; 68 Ricardo Rodríguez; 59 Connor Sadzeck; 52 Adrian Sampson; 54 Jeffrey Springs	Catchers: 8 Juan Centeno; 61 Robinson Chirinos; 60 Carlos Pérez; 71 Jose Trevino; Infielders: 2 Hanser Alberto; 1 Elvis Andrus; 29 Adrián Beltré; 67 Ronald Guzmán; 9 Isiah Kiner-Falefa; 20 Renato Núñez; 12 Rougned Odor; 19 Jurickson Profar	Outfielders: 5 Willie Calhoun; 17 Shin-Soo Choo; 3 Delino DeShields; 13 Joey Gallo; 30 Nomar Mazara; 18 Drew Robinson; 16 Ryan Rua; 15 Carlos Tocci	Manager: 28 Jeff Banister; 23 Don Wakamatsu; Coaches: 27 Tony Beasley (third base); 46 Doug Brocail (pitching); 22 Steve Buechele (first base); 66 Josh Frasier (bullpen catcher); 24 Anthony Iapoce (hitting); 0 Justin Mashore (assistant hitting); 4 Héctor Ortiz (bullpen); 23 Don Wakamatsu (bench); 39 Dan Warthen (assistant pitching)

== Player stats ==
=== Batting ===
Note: G = Games played; AB = At bats; R = Runs; H = Hits; 2B = Doubles; 3B = Triples; HR = Home runs; RBI = Runs batted in; SB = Stolen bases; BB = Walks; AVG = Batting average; SLG = Slugging average

Player	G	AB	R	H	2B	3B	HR	RBI	SB	BB	AVG	SLG
Shin-Soo Choo	146	560	83	148	30	1	21	62	6	92	.264	.434
Jurickson Profar	146	524	82	133	35	6	20	77	10	54	.254	.458
Joey Gallo	148	500	82	103	24	1	40	92	3	74	.206	.498
Nomar Mazara	128	489	61	126	25	1	20	77	1	40	.258	.436
Rougned Odor	129	474	76	120	23	2	18	63	12	43	.253	.424
Adrián Beltré	119	433	49	118	23	1	15	65	1	34	.273	.434
Elvis Andrus	97	395	53	101	20	3	6	33	5	28	.256	.367
Ronald Guzmán	123	387	46	91	18	2	16	58	1	33	.235	.416
Robinson Chirinos	113	360	48	80	15	1	18	65	2	45	.222	.419
Isiah Kiner-Falefa	111	356	43	93	18	2	4	34	7	28	.261	.357
Delino DeShields Jr.	106	334	52	72	14	1	2	22	20	43	.216	.281
Ryan Rua	61	139	17	27	3	1	6	12	3	5	.194	.360
Carlos Tocci	66	120	11	27	3	2	0	5	0	7	.225	.283
Drew Robinson	47	109	20	20	3	0	3	9	2	16	.183	.294
Willie Calhoun	35	99	8	22	5	0	2	11	0	6	.222	.333
Carlos Pérez	20	49	1	7	2	0	1	3	1	1	.143	.245
Juan Centeno	10	37	3	6	1	0	1	3	0	1	.162	.270
Renato Núñez	13	36	2	6	1	0	1	2	0	3	.167	.278
Hanser Alberto	13	27	0	5	2	0	0	0	0	2	.185	.259
Jose Trevino	3	8	0	2	0	0	0	3	0	0	.250	.250
Pitcher totals	162	17	0	1	1	0	0	0	0	0	.059	.118
Team totals	162	5453	737	1308	266	24	194	696	74	555	.240	.404

=== Pitching ===
Note: W = Wins; L = Losses; ERA = Earned run average; G = Games pitched; GS = Games started; SV = Saves; IP = Innings pitched; H = Hits allowed; R = Runs allowed; ER = Earned runs allowed; BB = Walks allowed; SO = Strikeouts

Player	W	L	ERA	G	GS	SV	IP	H	R	ER	BB	SO
Mike Minor	12	8	4.18	28	28	0	157.0	138	76	73	38	132
Bartolo Colón	7	12	5.78	28	24	0	146.1	172	97	94	25	81
Cole Hamels	5	9	4.72	20	20	0	114.1	115	70	60	42	114
Matt Moore	3	8	6.79	39	12	0	102.0	128	82	77	41	86
Yovani Gallardo	8	8	5.77	18	18	0	92.0	99	60	59	43	56
Martín Pérez	2	7	6.22	22	15	0	85.1	116	68	59	36	52
Alex Claudio	4	2	4.48	66	1	1	68.1	91	35	34	13	41
Doug Fister	1	7	4.50	12	12	0	66.0	73	40	33	19	40
José Leclerc	2	3	1.56	59	0	12	57.2	24	16	10	25	85
Jesse Chavez	3	1	3.51	30	0	1	56.1	58	23	22	12	50
Ariel Jurado	5	5	5.93	12	8	0	54.2	66	36	36	18	22
Austin Bibens-Dirkx	2	3	6.20	13	6	0	45.0	56	33	31	14	33
Chris Martin	1	5	4.54	46	0	0	41.2	46	21	21	5	37
Jake Diekman	1	1	3.69	47	0	2	39.0	31	18	16	23	48
Keone Kela	3	3	3.44	38	0	24	36.2	28	14	14	14	44
Eddie Butler	1	2	6.47	22	0	2	32.0	43	24	23	12	18
Jeffrey Springs	1	1	3.38	18	2	0	32.0	32	14	12	14	31
Yohander Méndez	2	2	5.53	8	5	0	27.2	28	18	17	15	18
Tony Barnette	2	0	2.39	22	0	0	26.1	19	11	7	5	26
Adrian Sampson	0	3	4.30	5	4	0	23.0	24	13	11	4	15
Matt Bush	0	0	4.70	21	0	0	23.0	23	13	12	14	19
Cory Gearrin	1	0	2.53	21	0	0	21.1	13	6	6	6	20
Drew Hutchison	1	1	8.86	5	5	0	21.1	29	21	21	13	12
Kevin Jepsen	0	3	5.94	21	0	0	16.2	15	13	11	11	8
Connor Sadzeck	0	0	0.96	13	2	0	9.1	6	2	1	11	7
Brandon Mann	0	0	5.40	7	0	0	8.1	7	5	5	4	3
C. D. Pelham	0	0	7.04	10	0	0	7.2	12	6	6	4	7
Zac Curtis	0	1	9.45	8	0	0	6.2	6	8	7	9	8
Ricardo Rodríguez	0	0	4.05	4	0	0	6.2	11	3	3	1	3
Nick Gardewine	0	0	3.60	3	0	0	5.0	7	2	2	0	4
Ryan Rua	0	0	0.00	1	0	0	1.0	0	0	0	0	1
Carlos Tocci	0	0	0.00	1	0	0	0.2	0	0	0	0	0
Team totals	67	95	4.92	162	162	42	1431.0	1516	848	783	491	1121

== Farm system ==
Level	Team	League	Manager
AAA	Round Rock Express	Pacific Coast League	Jason Wood
AA	Frisco RoughRiders	Texas League	Joe Mikulik
A-Advanced	Down East Wood Ducks	Carolina League	Spike Owen
A	Hickory Crawdads	South Atlantic League	Matt Hagen
A-Short Season	Spokane Indians	Northwest League	Kenny Holmberg
Rookie	AZL Rangers	Arizona League	Matt Siegel
Rookie	DSL Rangers	Dominican Summer League	Chad Comer
