= Texas Rangers award winners and league leaders =

This is a list of award winners and league leaders for the Texas Rangers baseball team (not including the franchise's first eleven years (1961–1971) as the Washington Senators).

== Key ==
Position	Indicates the player's primary position
(#)	Number of wins by individuals who won an award multiple times

== Baseball Hall of Famers ==
Ten Rangers have been inducted in the National Baseball Hall of Fame and Museum.

Year	Name	Career	Position	Ref.
1966	Ted Williams	1969–1972	Manager	
1991	Ferguson Jenkins	1974–1975, 1978–1981	Pitcher	
1991	Gaylord Perry	1975–1977, 1980	Pitcher	
1999	Nolan Ryan	1989–1993	Pitcher	
2008	Goose Gossage	1991	Pitcher	
2010	Whitey Herzog	1973	Manager	
2011	Bert Blyleven	1976–1977	Pitcher	
2017	Iván Rodríguez	1991–2002, 2009	Catcher	
2018	Vladimir Guerrero	2010	Designated hitter	
2019	Harold Baines	1989–1990	Designated hitter	
2024	Adrián Beltré	2011–2018	Third baseman	

== Awards ==
=== Most Valuable Player ===
Five Rangers have won the Major League Baseball Most Valuable Player Award.

Year	Name	Position	Ref.
1974	Jeff Burroughs	Left fielder	
1996	Juan González (1)	Right fielder	
1998	Juan González (2)	Right fielder	
1999	Iván Rodríguez	Catcher	
2003	Alex Rodriguez	Shortstop	
2010	Josh Hamilton	Left fielder	

=== Rookie of the Year ===
Two Rangers have won the Major League Baseball Rookie of the Year Award.

Year	Name	Position	Ref.
1974	Mike Hargrove	First baseman	
2010	Neftalí Feliz	Pitcher	

=== Manager of the Year ===
Three Rangers have won the Major League Baseball Manager of the Year Award.

Year	Name	Ref.
1996	Johnny Oates	
2004	Buck Showalter	
2015	Jeff Banister	

=== World Series MVP ===
One Ranger has won the World Series Most Valuable Player Award.

Year	Name	Position	Ref.
2023	Corey Seager	Shortstop	

=== Gold Glove Award ===
Sixteen Rangers have won the Gold Glove Award, which includes seven multi-time winners. Cumulatively, the Rangers have won four 4 at pitcher, 17 at catcher, 5 at first base, 9 at third base, 3 at shortstop, and 3 at outfield for a total of 38 Gold Gloves.

Year	Name	Position	Ref.
1976	Jim Sundberg (1)	Catcher	
1977	Juan Beníquez	Outfielder	
1977	Jim Sundberg (2)	Catcher	
1978	Jim Sundberg (3)	Catcher	
1979	Buddy Bell (1)	Third baseman	
1979	Jim Sundberg (4)	Catcher	
1980	Buddy Bell (2)	Third baseman	
1980	Jim Sundberg (5)	Catcher	
1981	Buddy Bell (3)	Third baseman	
1981	Jim Sundberg (6)	Catcher	
1982	Buddy Bell (4)	Third baseman	
1983	Buddy Bell (5)	Third baseman	
1984	Buddy Bell (6)	Third baseman	
1990	Gary Pettis	Outfielder	
1992	Iván Rodríguez (1)	Catcher	
1993	Iván Rodríguez (2)	Catcher	
1994	Iván Rodríguez (3)	Catcher	
1995	Iván Rodríguez (4)	Catcher	
1996	Iván Rodríguez (5)	Catcher	
1997	Iván Rodríguez (6)	Catcher	
1998	Iván Rodríguez (7)	Catcher	
1999	Rafael Palmeiro	First baseman	
1999	Iván Rodríguez (8)	Catcher	
2000	Iván Rodríguez (9)	Catcher	
2000	Kenny Rogers (1)	Pitcher	
2001	Iván Rodríguez (10)	Catcher	
2002	Alex Rodriguez (1)	Shortstop	
2002	Kenny Rogers (2)	Pitcher	
2003	Alex Rodriguez (2)	Shortstop	
2004	Kenny Rogers (3)	Pitcher	
2005	Kenny Rogers (4)	Pitcher	
2005	Mark Teixeira (1)	First baseman	
2006	Mark Teixeira (2)	First baseman	
2008	Michael Young	Shortstop	
2011	Adrián Beltré (1)	Third baseman	
2012	Adrián Beltré (2)	Third baseman	
2016	Adrián Beltré (3)	Third baseman	
2016	Mitch Moreland	First baseman	
2023	Adolis Garcia	Right fielder	
2023	Jonah Heim	Catcher	
2023	Nathaniel Lowe	First baseman	
2025	Marcus Semien	Second baseman	
2026	Ezequiel Durán	Utility player	

=== Platinum Glove Award ===
One Ranger has won the Platinum Glove Award.

Year	Name	Position	Ref.
2011	Adrián Beltré (1)	Third baseman	
2012	Adrián Beltré (2)	Third baseman	

=== Wilson Defensive Player of the Year Award ===
Three Rangers have won the Wilson Defensive Player of the Year Award.

Year	Name	Position	Ref.
2012	Adrián Beltré	Third baseman	
2013	Craig Gentry	Outfielder	
2014	Ian Kinsler	Second baseman	

=== Silver Slugger Award ===
- DH
  - Al Oliver (1981)
  - Rafael Palmeiro (1999)
  - Vladimir Guerrero (2010)
- Catcher
  - Iván Rodríguez [6] (1994–99)
- First baseman
  - Mark Teixeira [2] (2004–05)
  - Nathaniel Lowe (2022)
- Second baseman
  - Julio Franco [3] (1989–91)
  - Alfonso Soriano [2] (2004–05)
  - Marcus Semien (2023)
- Third baseman
  - Buddy Bell (1984)
  - Adrián Beltré [2] (2011, 2014)
- Shortstop
  - Alex Rodriguez [3] (2001–03)
  - Corey Seager (2023)
- Outfielders
  - Al Oliver (1980)
  - Rubén Sierra (1989)
  - Juan González [5] (1992–93, 1996–98)
  - Josh Hamilton (2008, 2010)
- Utility
  - Josh Smith (2024)

=== Hank Aaron Award ===
One Ranger has won the Hank Aaron Award.

Year	Name	Position	Ref.
2001	Alex Rodriguez (1)	Shortstop	
2002	Alex Rodriguez (2)	Shortstop	
2003	Alex Rodriguez (3)	Shortstop	

=== Edgar Martínez Award ===
Two Rangers have won the Edgar Martínez Award, formerly known as the Outstanding Designated Hitter Award.

Year	Name
1999	Rafael Palmeiro
2010	Vladimir Guerrero

=== Rolaids Relief Man of the Year Award ===
See footnote

- Jim Kern (1979)
- Jeff Russell (1989)

=== The Sporting News Comeback Player of the Year ===
See footnote below

- 1974 – Ferguson Jenkins
- 1991 – José Guzmán
- 1996 – Kevin Elster
- 2001 – Rubén Sierra

=== MLB "This Year in Baseball Awards" ===
See: This Year in Baseball Awards#Award winners
Note: Voted by five groups as the best in all of Major League Baseball (i.e., not two awards, one for each league).
Note: These awards were renamed the "GIBBY Awards" (Greatness in Baseball Yearly) in 2010 and then the "Esurance MLB Awards" in 2015.

==== "This Year in Baseball Awards" Player of the Year ====
- Josh Hamilton (2010)

==== "This Year in Baseball Awards" Defensive Player of the Year ====
- Elvis Andrus (2010)

==== "Esurance MLB Awards" Best Bounceback Player ====
- Prince Fielder (2015)

=== Ted Williams MVP Award (All-Star Game) ===
- Julio Franco (1990)
- Alfonso Soriano (2004)
- Michael Young (2006)
- Josh Hamilton (2010)

=== All-Star Game — Home Run Derby champion ===
- Juan González (1993)
- Josh Hamilton (2010)

=== DHL Hometown Heroes (2006) ===
- Nolan Ryan — voted by MLB fans as the most outstanding player in the history of the franchise, based on on-field performance, leadership quality and character value

=== Baseball Prospectus Internet Baseball Awards AL Most Valuable Player ===
See: Baseball Prospectus#Internet Baseball Awards

- Josh Hamilton (2010)

=== USA Today AL Most Valuable Player ===
- Josh Hamilton (2010)

=== Topps All-Star Rookie teams ===
- 1974: Mike Hargrove
- 1977: Bump Wills
- 1979: Pat Putnam, Billy Sample
- 1985: Oddibe McDowell
- 1986: Pete Incaviglia
- 1988: Cecil Espy
- 1990: Jeff Huson
- 1991: Iván Rodríguez
- 2000: Mike Lamb
- 2003: Mark Teixeira
- 2008: David Murphy
- 2009: Elvis Andrus

=== MLB Insiders Club Magazine All-Postseason Team ===
- 2011 – Mike Napoli (C), Nelson Cruz (OF; one of three), Derek Holland (SP; one of three)

=== Associated Press Manager of the Year Award ===
See footnote

- Billy Martin (1974)

=== Baseball Prospectus Internet Baseball Awards AL Manager of the Year ===
See: Baseball Prospectus#Internet Baseball Awards
See footnote

- Ron Washington (2010)

=== USA Today AL Manager of the Year ===
See footnote

- Ron Washington (2010)

=== The Sporting News Executive of the Year Award ===
- Doug Melvin (1996)

=== Baseball America Major League Executive of the Year ===
See: Baseball America Major League Executive of the Year

- Jon Daniels (2010)

== Team award ==
- 1989 – Baseball America Organization of the Year
- 2010 – William Harridge Trophy (American League champion)
- 2011 – William Harridge Trophy (American League champion)

== Minor league system ==
=== Tom Grieve Minor League Player of the Year ===
Year	Recipient	Position	Ref.
1984	Tom Dunbar	Outfielder	
1985	Steve Buechele	Third baseman	
1986	Bob Brower	Outfielder	
1987	Wayne Rosenthal	Pitcher	
1988	Kevin Reimer	Outfielder	
1989	Jim Hvizda	Pitcher	
1990	Juan González	Outfielder	
1991	Rob Maurer	First baseman	
1992	Dan Smith	Pitcher	
1993	Rick Helling	Pitcher	
1994	Julio Santana	Pitcher	
1995	Fernando Tatís (1)	Third baseman	
1996	Lee Stevens	Designated hitter	
1997	Fernando Tatís (2)	Third baseman	
1998	Shawn Gallagher	First baseman	
1999	Mike Lamb	Third baseman	
2000	Kevin Mench	Outfielder	
2001	Hank Blalock	Third baseman	
2002	Laynce Nix	Outfielder	
2003	Ramón Nivar	Outfielder	
2004	Ian Kinsler	Shortstop	
2005	Travis Metcalf	Third baseman	
2006	Nate Gold	First baseman	
2007	Chris Davis	Third baseman	
2008	Nelson Cruz	Outfielder	
2009	Mitch Moreland	Outfielder	
2010	Engel Beltré	Outfielder	
2011	Jurickson Profar	Shortstop	
2012	Mike Olt	Third baseman	
2013	Rougned Odor	Second baseman	
2014	Joey Gallo	Third baseman	
2015	Nomar Mazara	Outfielder	
2016	Jose Trevino	Catcher	
2017	Ronald Guzmán	First baseman	
2018	Scott Heineman	Outfielder	
2019	Curtis Terry	First baseman	

=== Nolan Ryan Minor League Pitcher of the Year ===
Year	Recipient	Position	Ref.
1995	Jeff Davis	Right-handed pitcher	
1996	Ted Silva	Right-handed pitcher	
1997	Corey Lee	Left-handed pitcher	
1998	Jeff Zimmerman	Right-handed pitcher	
1999	Doug Davis	Left-handed pitcher	
2000	Jovanny Cedeno	Right-handed pitcher	
2001	Ryan Dittfurth	Right-handed pitcher	
2002	Ben Kozlowski	Left-handed pitcher	
2003	Juan Domínguez	Right-handed pitcher	
2004	Kameron Loe	Right-handed pitcher	
2005	Thomas Diamond	Right-handed pitcher	
2006	Eric Hurley	Right-handed pitcher	
2007	Edinson Vólquez	Right-handed pitcher	
2008	Derek Holland	Left-handed pitcher	
2009	Martín Pérez	Left-handed pitcher	
2010	Michael Kirkman	Left-handed pitcher	
2011	Robbie Ross Jr.	Left-handed pitcher	
2012	Cody Buckel	Right-handed pitcher	
2013	Luke Jackson	Right-handed pitcher	
2014	Chi Chi Gonzalez	Right-handed pitcher	
2015	Ariel Jurado	Right-handed pitcher	
2016	Yohander Méndez	Left-handed pitcher	
2017	Kyle Cody	Right-handed pitcher	
2018	Tyler Phillips	Right-handed pitcher	
2019	Jason Bahr	Right-handed pitcher	

=== Minor League Defender of the Year ===
Year	Recipient	Position	Ref.
2008	Jose Vallejo	Second baseman	
2009	Craig Gentry	Outfielder	
2010	José Félix	Catcher	
2011	Ryan Strausborger	Outfielder	
2012	Engel Beltré	Outfielder	
2013	Jake Skole	Outfielder	
2014	Hanser Alberto	Shortstop	
2015	Lewis Brinson	Outfielder	
2016	Ronald Guzmán	First baseman	
2017	Jose Trevino	Catcher	
2018	Ryan Dorow	Shortstop	
2019	Matt Whatley	Catcher	

=== Minor League Reliever of the Year ===
Year	Recipient	Position	Ref.
2010	Cody Eppley	Right-handed pitcher	
2011	Justin Miller	Right-handed pitcher	
2012	Ben Rowen	Right-handed pitcher	
2013	Alex Claudio	Left-handed pitcher	
2014	Phil Klein	Right-handed pitcher	
2015	Andrew Faulkner	Left-handed pitcher	
2016	John Fasola	Right-handed pitcher	
2017	Ricardo Rodríguez	Right-handed pitcher	
2018	Demarcus Evans (1)	Right-handed pitcher	
2019	Demarcus Evans (2)	Right-handed pitcher	

=== True Ranger Award ===
The True Ranger Award recognizes "players who represent the core values of the organization in a positive light both on and off the field."

Year	Recipient	Position	Ref.
2019	James Jones	Left-handed pitcher	

=== International Senior Athlete of the Year ===
- 2009 – Justin Smoak (Triple-A Oklahoma City)

== Other achievements ==
=== Texas Rangers Hall of Fame ===
See Texas Rangers (baseball)#Texas Rangers Hall of Fame

=== Retired numbers ===
See Texas Rangers (baseball)#Retired numbers

== American League statistical leaders ==
=== A.L. Batting Title ===
- Julio Franco, 1991
- Michael Young, 2005
- Josh Hamilton, 2010

=== A.L. Home Run Champ ===
- Frank Howard, 1968, 1970
- Juan González, 1992, 1993
- Alex Rodriguez, 2001, 2002, 2003

== See also ==
- Baseball awards
- List of MLB awards
