= Ryan Rua =

American baseball player (born 1990)

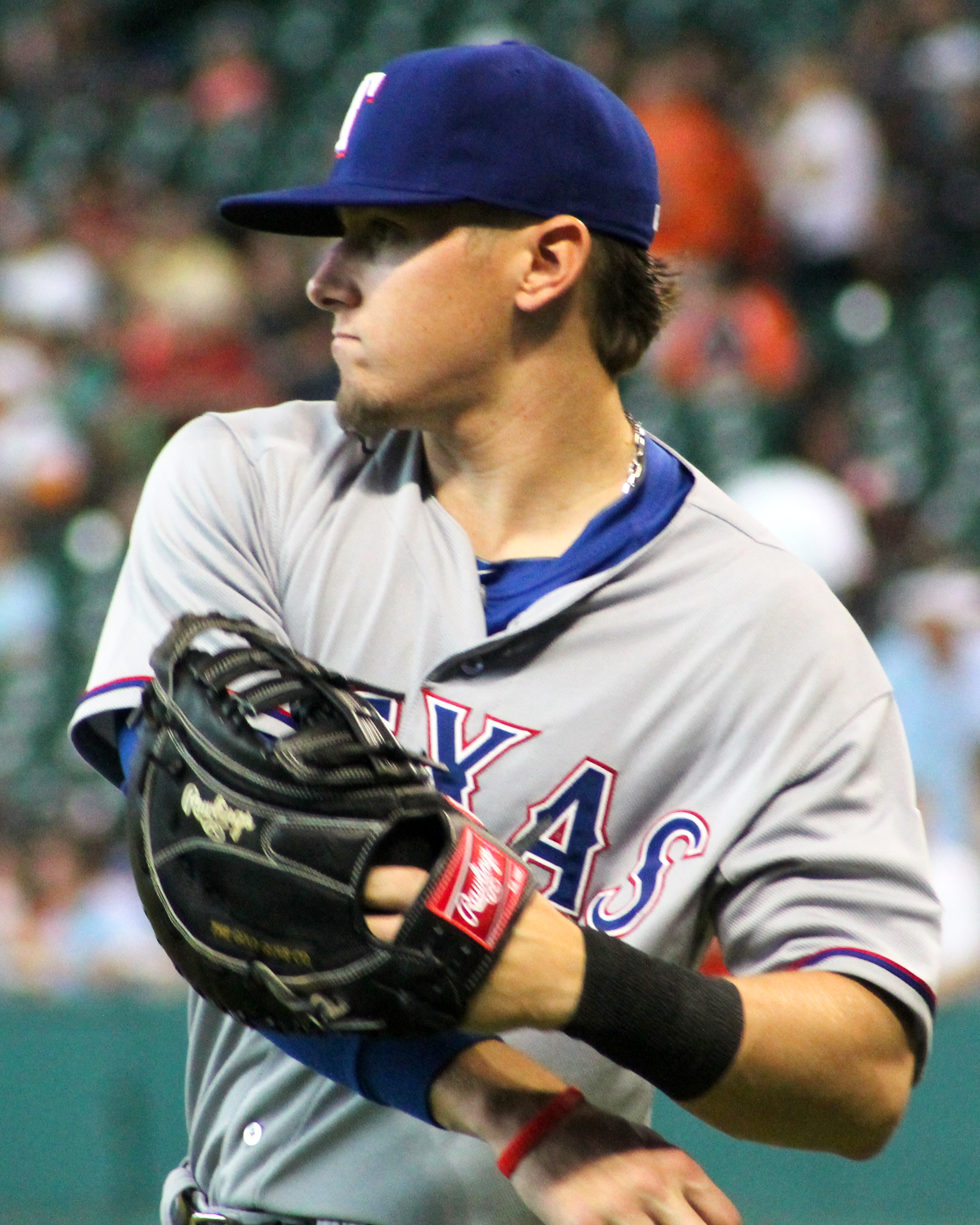
- Rua playing first base for the Texas Rangers
- Outfielder / First baseman
- Born: March 11, 1990 (age 36); Amherst, Ohio, U.S.
- Batted: Right Threw: Right

MLB debut
- August 29, 2014, for the Texas Rangers

Last MLB appearance
- September 29, 2018, for the Texas Rangers

MLB statistics
- Batting average: .236
- Home runs: 23
- Runs batted in: 67
- Stats at Baseball Reference

Teams
- Texas Rangers (2014–2018)

Ryan Anthony Rua (born March 11, 1990) is an American former professional baseball outfielder and first baseman. He played in Major League Baseball (MLB) for the Texas Rangers.

== Career ==
Rua attended Marion L. Steele High School in Amherst, Ohio. He attended NCAA Division II Lake Erie College. Rua was drafted by the Texas Rangers in the 17th round of the 2011 Major League Baseball draft. He was the first player in school history to be drafted.

He made his professional debut for the Arizona League Rangers that year and also played for the Spokane Indians. In 52 games, he hit .303./.376/.484 with four home runs. He returned to Spokane in 2012 and hit .293/.368/.432 with seven home runs in 74 games. During his time in the minor leagues, Rua primarily played third base and second base.

Rua started 2013 with the Hickory Crawdads. At the end of June he was leading the entire minor leagues in homers. On August 9, he was promoted to the Double-A Frisco RoughRiders. He finished the year hitting .247/.347/.525 with 32 home runs in 127 games.

He started the 2014 season back with Frisco. Rua was called up to the big leagues for the first time on August 29, 2014, and made his debut the same day at first base, collecting his first hit on an infield single. Rua finished his debut going 1-for-5 with a run scored. On September 21, 2014, Rua hit his first career homer, a solo shot off Angels' closer Huston Street, sending the Rangers to a 2–1 victory.

Rua made the Rangers 2015 opening day roster, and on opening day, Rua had the only base hit for the Rangers as they fell to Oakland 8–0. On July 30, 2015, Rua hit an inside-the-park home run against the New York Yankees in the bottom of the fourth inning, tying the game 5–5 (the Rangers went on to win 7–6 after a walk-off from Josh Hamilton).

Before Opening Day 2016, Rua was informed he had made the Opening Day roster. He started out as a bench player, but as the end of April progressed, manager Jeff Banister began to trust Rua more and more as an every day player. When center fielder Delino DeShields, Jr. was sent down to Triple-A on May 13, Ian Desmond moved to center and Rua received the left field job. On May 10, 2016, he hit a 3-run home run in the 8th inning against the Chicago White Sox to cap the biggest Rangers' comeback since 2012 (13–11). But Rua began to struggle again and by the end of May he had lost his job to Nomar Mazara. In 99 games, Rua hit .258 with 8 home runs and 22 RBIs. The next two seasons, Rua would shuffle between the minors and the Rangers roster. Rua made one pitching appearance on July 23, 2018, throwing a scoreless inning and recording one strikeout. In 61 games for the Rangers, he batted .194/.221/.360 with six home runs and 12 RBI. On November 2, Rua was removed from the 40–man roster and sent outright to Triple–A. He subsequently elected free agency the same day.

== Personal life ==
Rua's number 2 was retired by Marion L. Steele High School in 2015.
