= Jeff Banister =

American baseball player, coach, and manager (born 1964)

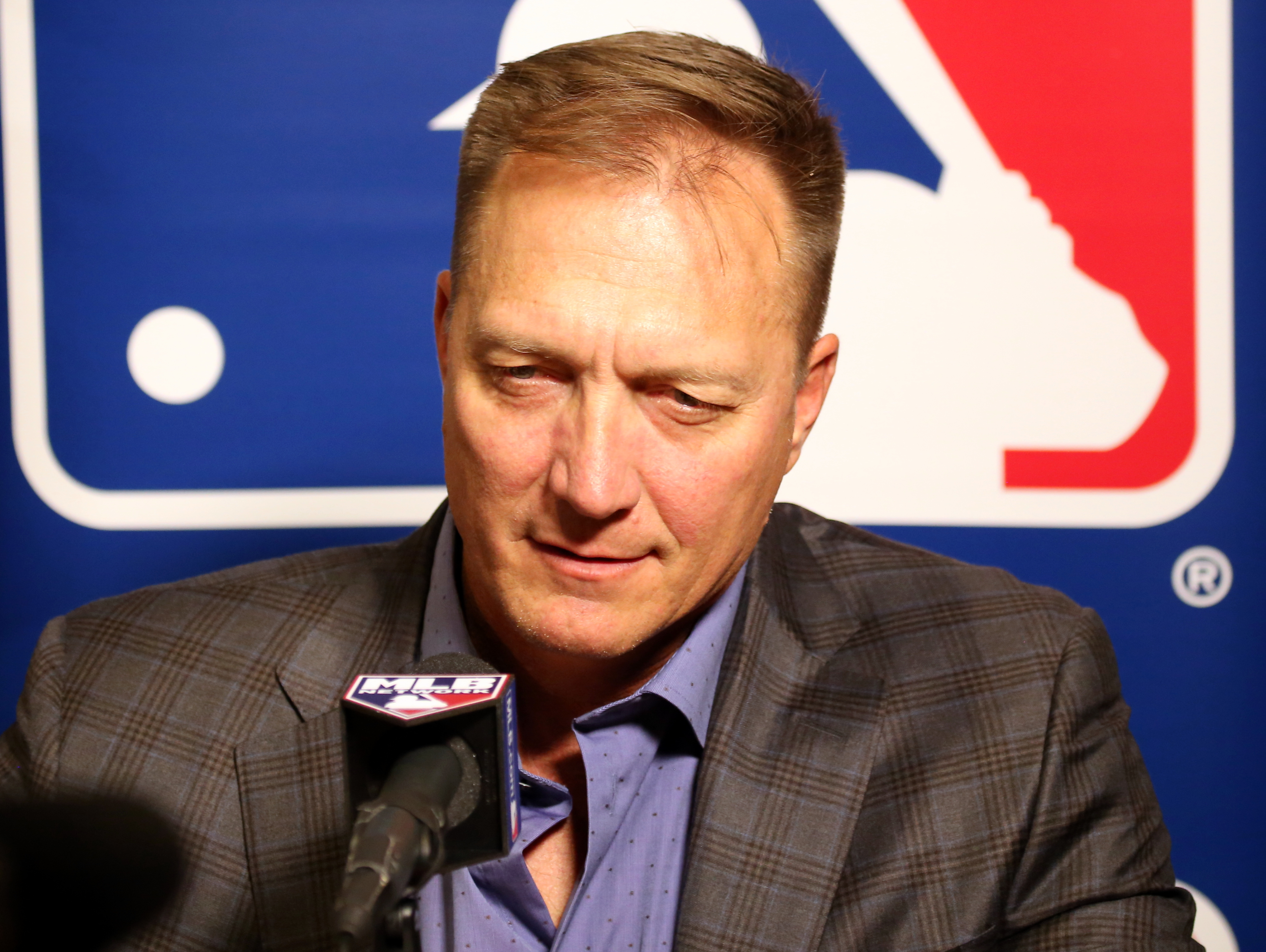
- Banister at the 2015 Winter Meetings

Arizona Diamondbacks – No. 82
- Catcher / Manager / Coach
- Born: January 15, 1964 (age 62); Weatherford, Oklahoma, U.S.
- Batted: Right Threw: Right

MLB debut
- July 23, 1991, for the Pittsburgh Pirates

Last MLB appearance
- July 23, 1991, for the Pittsburgh Pirates

MLB statistics
- Batting average: 1.000
- Hits: 1
- Managerial record: 325–313
- Winning %: .509
- Stats at Baseball Reference
- Managerial record at Baseball Reference

Teams
- As player: Pittsburgh Pirates (1991); As manager: Texas Rangers (2015–2018); As coach: Pittsburgh Pirates (2010–2014); Arizona Diamondbacks (2022–present)

Career highlights and awards
- AL Manager of the Year (2015)

Jeffery Todd Banister (born January 15, 1964) is an American former professional baseball player and manager who is the bench coach for the Arizona Diamondbacks of Major League Baseball (MLB). Previously, he served as a special assistant for the Pittsburgh Pirates. He was also as the manager of the Texas Rangers from 2015 through 2018. Before joining the Rangers, Banister spent 29 years within the Pirates organization as a player and coach in both the Pirates' major and minor league system.

Banister played baseball at La Marque High School in La Marque, Texas. He developed bone cancer in his sophomore year, which almost necessitated the amputation of his left leg below the knee. While playing college baseball for Lee College, he suffered a home plate collision which broke three vertebrae in his neck, leaving him paralyzed for ten days. After rehabilitating, he was named a Junior College All-American the next season, and received a scholarship to the University of Houston, to play for the Houston Cougars baseball team. He was then drafted by the Pirates in 1986. After playing in Minor League Baseball, he appeared in one major league game on July 23, 1991, recording a hit in his only plate appearance. He did not appear in another major league game, ending his playing career after the 1993 season.

Following his playing career, Banister remained with the Pirates. He served as a manager for their Minor League Baseball affiliates from 1994 through 1998, and then as a minor league and major league field coordinator until 2010. The Pirates considered him for their managerial vacancy before the 2011 season, though hired him as their bench coach, serving in that role through the 2014 season. The Rangers hired Banister as their manager during the 2014–15 offseason, and he was named the American League Manager of the Year for 2015.

== Playing career ==
=== Amateur career ===
Banister attended La Marque High School in La Marque, Texas. At La Marque, Banister played for the school's baseball, basketball, and American football teams. During his sophomore year of high school, Banister injured his right ankle while playing baseball. During an examination of his ankle, which was slow to heal, he was diagnosed with bone cancer. He had developed cysts which required skin grafting to treat. An infection in his leg led to the development of osteomyelitis, which spread from his right ankle to just below his knee. Doctors recommended amputation to save the rest of his leg, but Banister refused, as he hoped he would be able to continue his baseball career. Doctors performed seven operations on his leg, which saved it from being amputated. In his senior year, Banister suffered a knee injury playing American football, which nearly led to him being cut from the baseball team because of his decreased mobility. His father suggested he change positions and become a catcher, which allowed him to remain on the baseball team.

At a tryout conducted by professional scouts, Banister was noticed by the coaches at Lee College, a junior college in Baytown, Texas. They recruited Banister to play college baseball at Lee. While catching in a 1983 game, he suffered a collision at home plate, where the baserunner attempted to jump over him, and hit Banister in the head with his knee; this collision broke three of the vertebrae in his neck. Banister was not originally scheduled to play in that game; a scout for the New York Yankees of Major League Baseball (MLB) told Lee's coach that he hoped to see Banister catch, which resulted in Banister being added to the starting lineup in a last-minute change. As a result of the collision, Banister was paralyzed from the neck down for ten days. Doctors initially warned him that he may never walk again. He had another three operations performed on his back and learned how to walk again during the 1984 season. Entering the hospital weighing 225 pounds (102 kg), he weighed 139 pounds (63 kg) when he was discharged. Banister recovered and played another season for Lee in 1985, and was named a Junior College All-American. He transferred to University of Houston after the season to play for the Houston Cougars baseball team on a scholarship in 1986.

=== Professional career ===
The Pittsburgh Pirates selected Banister in the 25th round of the 1986 Major League Baseball draft; he was the 621st player chosen in the draft. Playing in Minor League Baseball, Banister made his professional debut as a member of the Watertown Pirates of the Class A-Short Season New York–Penn League in 1986. He had a .145 batting average in 46 games played. In 1987, he played for the Macon Pirates of the Class A South Atlantic League, and batted .254 in 101 games. Banister then played 71 games for the Harrisburg Senators of the Class AA Eastern League in 1988, batting .259. He returned to Harrisburg in 1989, when he batted .238 in 102 games. He was named an Eastern League All-Star in 1989. He returned to Harrisburg for the 1990 season, and recorded a .269 batting average in 101 games. During the 1990 season, he received a promotion to the Buffalo Bisons of the Class AAA American Association. In 12 games for the Bisons, Banister batted .320.

Banister began the 1991 season with Buffalo. The Pirates promoted Banister from the minor leagues on July 23, 1991, when catcher Don Slaught was injured and placed on the disabled list. Manager Jim Leyland used Banister as a pinch hitter for pitcher Doug Drabek in the eighth inning of that day's game against the Atlanta Braves at Three Rivers Stadium. Using Cecil Espy's bat, Banister hit a ball from Dan Petry and just beat shortstop Jeff Blauser's throw to first base. Banister is one of only 15 batters (excluding pitchers) in baseball history to record a hit in his only major league plate appearance.

Banister was sent back to Buffalo without playing in another game for Pittsburgh. He finished the Class AAA season with a .244 average in 79 games. He missed the 1992 season when he suffered a right elbow injury that required surgery. Banister served as a player-coach for the Carolina Mudcats of the Class AA Southern League in 1993. Playing in only eight games, he had a .333 batting average. After the season, he ended his playing career. He retired with a career .247 batting average in 515 minor league games played.

== Coaching and managerial career ==
=== Overview ===
After retiring as a player, Banister remained with the Pirates' organization. From 1994 through 1998, Banister served as a manager in the Pirates' minor league system. He served as the manager of the Welland Pirates of the New York–Penn League in 1994. A year later, he managed the Augusta GreenJackets of the South Atlantic League, and led them to win the league's championship. Banister managed in the Hawaiian Winter League in the 1995 and 1996 offseasons. From 1996 through 1997, he was the manager of the Lynchburg Hillcats of the Class A-Advanced Carolina League. Midway through the 1997 season, he was named the manager of the Carolina Mudcats, a position he held through the 1998 season. Banister had a 299–330 win–loss record (a .475 winning percentage) as a manager from 1994 through 1998.

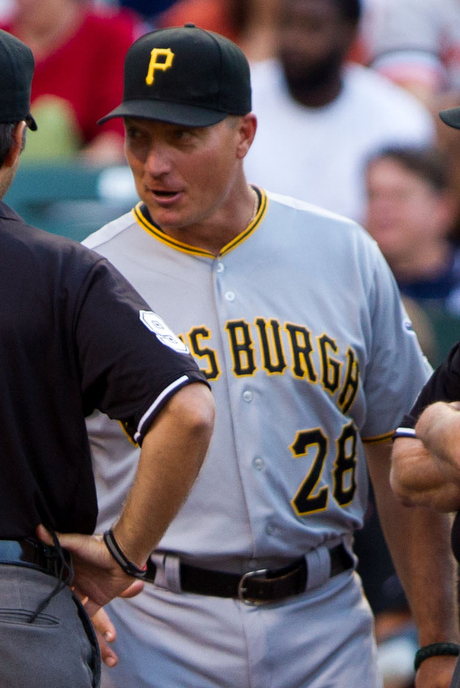
Banister with the Pittsburgh Pirates in 2012

From 1999 through 2002, Banister worked as Pittsburgh's Major League Field Coordinator on the coaching staffs of managers Gene Lamont and Lloyd McClendon. He was then assigned the job of Minor League Field Coordinator, and served in that role from 2003 through 2010. In 2004, he served as the interim manager of Lynchburg when Jay Loviglio resigned from the position for personal reasons. Banister became the interim pitching coach for Lynchburg in 2008 when Bob Milacki resigned from the position. Mike Steele then took the job from Banister in 2009. Banister managed the Scottsdale Scorpions of the Arizona Fall League (AFL) in 2009.

On August 8, 2010, Banister was named the Pirates' interim bench coach after Gary Varsho was fired by the organization. At the end of the 2010 season, the Pirates fired manager John Russell. Banister and Clint Hurdle were the two finalists for the position. The Pirates named Hurdle as their manager, and Banister was named their full-time bench coach. As the Pirates bench coach, Banister learned about sabermetrics from a quantitative analyst who traveled with the team. Banister learned to use quantitative data to inform his decisions on when the Pirates should employ defensive shifts in the field. He was initially chosen to manage Scottsdale in the AFL after the 2014 season, but he was replaced by Pirates' special assistant Frank Kremblas due to the possibility of the Pirates reaching the MLB postseason.

After the 2014 season, Banister interviewed with the Houston Astros as a candidate to fill their managing vacancy, following the firing of Bo Porter. The Astros instead hired A. J. Hinch. He also interviewed with the Texas Rangers, and was a finalist for the position along with Rangers' interim manager Tim Bogar and pitching coach Mike Maddux. On October 16, 2014, the Rangers named Banister their new manager. He signed a three-year contract with an option for a fourth season. Jon Daniels, the Rangers' general manager, indicated that Banister will help the Rangers to incorporate analytics into their baseball decisions.

As Banister and Daniels began to discuss the coaching staff for the 2015 season, it was decided that Bogar, who had a 14–8 record (.636 winning percentage) after Ron Washington's resignation, would not return to the Rangers under Banister. Banister retained Maddux and hitting coach Dave Magadan on his coaching staff, but third base coach Gary Pettis left for the Astros and first base coach Bengie Molina did not return to the team in that role. Banister guided the Rangers to the American League West division championship with a record of 88 wins and 74 losses. The Rangers would end up losing to the Toronto Blue Jays in the American League Division Series. Banister was named the American League Manager of the Year after the season.

During the 2015–16 offseason, the Rangers extended Banister's contract through the 2018 season, with an option for the 2019 season, while also releasing pitching coach Mike Maddux and hitting coach Dave Magadan. Bannister later hired Doug Brocail as the new pitching coach and Anthony Iapoce as the new hitting coach.

On September 21, 2018, following several days of speculation and rumors about Banister's future with the Rangers, Banister was fired following a surprise meeting with the Rangers management. He finished with a record of 325 wins and 313 losses in 638 games. On January 6, 2019, the Pirates hired Banister as a special assistant in baseball operations. In June 2020, Banister and 14 others were laid off by the Pirates as they restructured their front office.

On November 2, 2021, Banister was hired by the Arizona Diamondbacks to be the team's bench coach for the 2022 season.

=== Managerial record ===
As of games played on September 21, 2018.

Team	Year	Regular season					Postseason			
Team	Year	Games	Won	Lost	Win %	Finish	Won	Lost	Win %	Result
TEX	2015	162	88	74	.543	1st in AL West	2	3	.400	Lost ALDS (TOR)
TEX	2016	162	95	67	.586	1st in AL West	0	3	.000	Lost ALDS (TOR)
TEX	2017	162	78	84	.481	4th in AL West	–	–	–	
TEX	2018	152	64	88	.421	5th in AL West	–	–	–	
Total		638	325	313	.509		2	6	.250	

== Personal life ==
Banister was born on January 15, 1964. He is originally from Weatherford, Oklahoma. At the age of six, the Banisters moved from Weatherford to La Marque. His father, Bob, coached Jeff at La Marque High School on both the football and basketball teams. His mother, Verda, was an algebra teacher at La Marque. He has a sister, Carey. In 1988, his father died at the age of 48 due to a heart attack. His grandfather died of a heart attack three weeks later.

Banister met his wife, Karen, while they were students at the University of Houston. Karen worked as a teacher at Clear Lake High School in Houston. The Banisters have two children: Alexandra and Jacob. Alexandra is a college volleyball player. The Banisters reside in Keller, Texas.

Banister won the inaugural Gilda Radner Courage Award. In 2011, Banister won the "Pride of the Pirates" award for demonstrating his "sportsmanship, dedication and outstanding character".

Sporting positions
Preceded by Larry Smith	Welland Pirates Manager; 1994	Succeeded by Last
Preceded by Scott Little	Augusta GreenJackets Manager; 1995	Succeeded by Jay Loviglio
Preceded by Marc Hill	Lynchburg Hillcats Manager; 1996–1997	Succeeded by Jeff Richardson
Preceded by Marc Hill	Carolina Mudcats Manager; 1997–1998	Succeeded by Jay Loviglio
Preceded by Gary Varsho	Pittsburgh Pirates Bench Coach; 2010–2014	Succeeded by Brad Fischer
Preceded by Ron Washington	Texas Rangers Manager; 2015–2018	Succeeded by Chris Woodward
