= Carlos Tocci =

Venezuelan baseball player (born 1995)

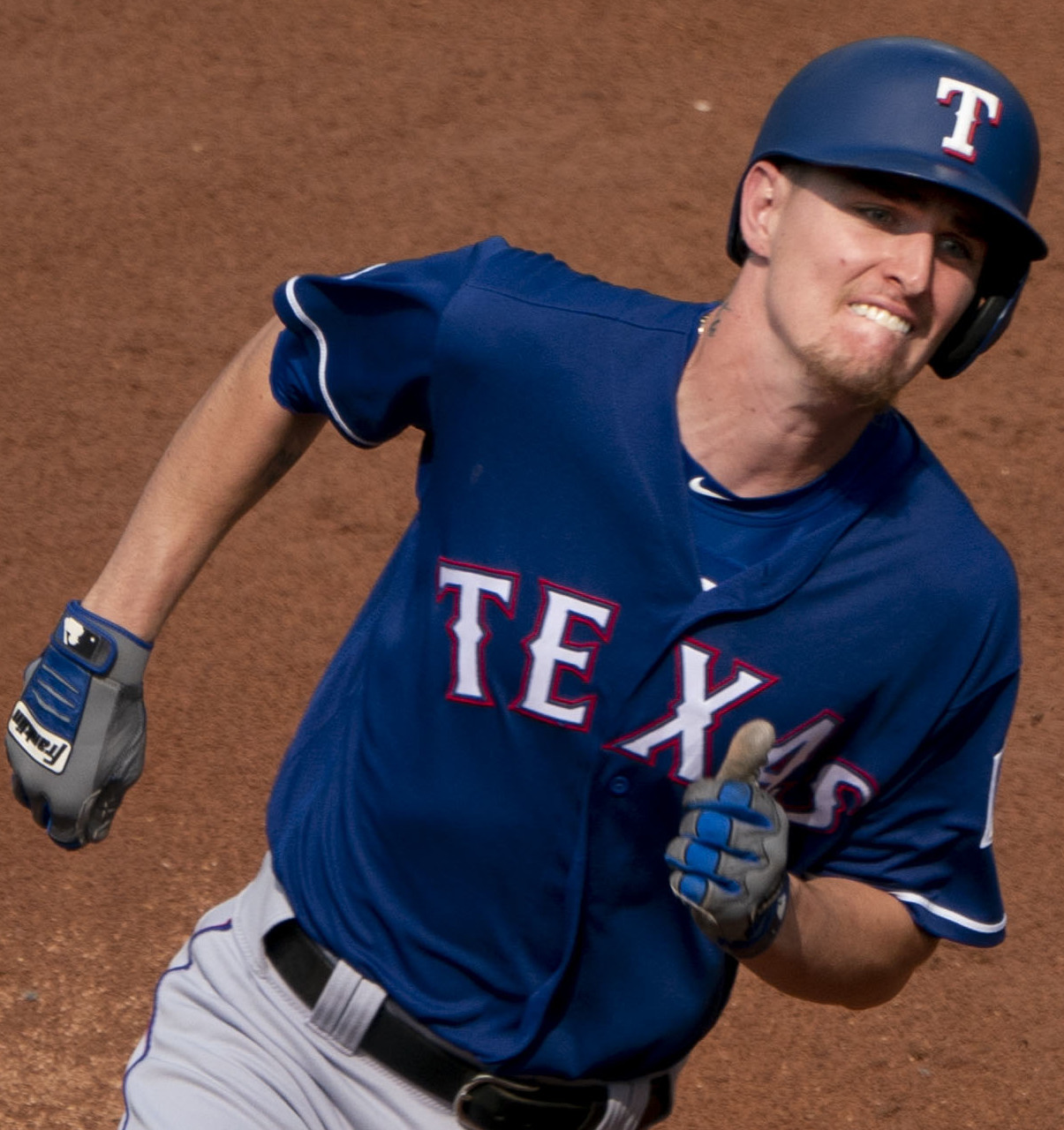
- Tocci with the Texas Rangers

Free agent
- Outfielder
- Born: August 23, 1995 (age 31); Maracay, Venezuela
- Bats: Right Throws: Right

MLB debut
- March 31, 2018, for the Texas Rangers

MLB statistics (through 2018 Season)
- Batting average: .225
- Home runs: 0
- Runs batted in: 5
- Stats at Baseball Reference

Teams
- Texas Rangers (2018)

Carlos Daniel Tocci Lugo (born August 23, 1995) is a Venezuelan professional baseball outfielder who is a free agent. He has previously played in Major League Baseball (MLB) for the Texas Rangers.

== Career ==
=== Philadelphia Phillies ===
Tocci signed with the Philadelphia Phillies as an international free agent in August 2011. He made his professional debut in 2012 with the Gulf Coast Phillies and spent the whole season there, slashing .278/.330/.299 in 38 games. He spent 2013 with the Lakewood BlueClaws where he batted .209 with 26 RBIs in 118 games and he returned there in 2014, posting a .242 batting average two home runs, 30 RBIs, and a .622 OPS in 125 games. He hit his professional home run in July 2014. In 2015, he played for Lakewood and the Clearwater Threshers, batting .287/.339/.363 with four home runs and 43 RBIs in 127 games between both teams, and in 2016, he returned to the Threshers, compiling a .284 batting average with three home runs and 50 RBIs in 127 games. He spent 2017 with both the Reading Fightin Phils and the Lehigh Valley IronPigs, slashing .294/.346/.381 with three home runs and 52 RBIs in 130 games.

=== Texas Rangers ===
After the 2017 season, the Chicago White Sox selected Tocci from the Phillies in the Rule 5 draft, and traded him to the Texas Rangers for cash considerations. Tocci made the Rangers' Opening Day 25-man roster. Tocci spent the 2018 season on the Texas roster, posting a batting line of .225/.271/.283/.554 with zero home runs, 5 RBI, and 120 at bats in 65 games.

In 2019, Tocci was optioned to the Triple-A Nashville Sounds to open the season. On July 22, 2019, Tocci was designated for assignment. On July 27, Tocci was outrighted to Nashville. On August 3, the Rangers released Tocci.

=== Washington Nationals ===
On January 7, 2020, Tocci signed a minor league deal with the Washington Nationals. Tocci did not play in a game in 2020 due to the cancellation of the minor league season because of the COVID-19 pandemic. In 2021, Tocci played in 50 games split between the Double-A Harrisburg Senators and the Triple-A Rochester Red Wings, hitting a cumulative .200/.273/.258 with one home run and 6 RBI. He was released on August 17, 2021.

=== Piratas de Campeche ===
On March 10, 2023, Tocci signed with the Piratas de Campeche of the Mexican League. In 88 games for the Piratas, he batted .265/.321/.366 with 7 home runs and 36 RBI. Tocci was released by Campeche on January 30, 2024.

=== Diablos Rojos del México ===
On April 18, 2025, Tocci signed with the Diablos Rojos del México of the Mexican League. In 10 appearances for the team, he batted .333/.457/.370 with four RBI and one stolen base. Tocci was released by the Diablos on May 21.

=== Caliente de Durango ===
On May 23, 2025, Tocci signed with the Caliente de Durango of the Mexican League. In six appearances for Durango, he went 4-for-20 (.200) with two RBI and four walks. Tocci was released by the Caliente on June 3.

=== Tiburones de La Guaira ===
On June 10, 2025, Tocci signed with the Tiburones de La Guaira of the Venezuelan Major League. He became a free agent following the season.

== See also ==
- Rule 5 draft results
- List of Major League Baseball players from Venezuela
