= Ronald Guzmán =

Dominican baseball player (born 1994)

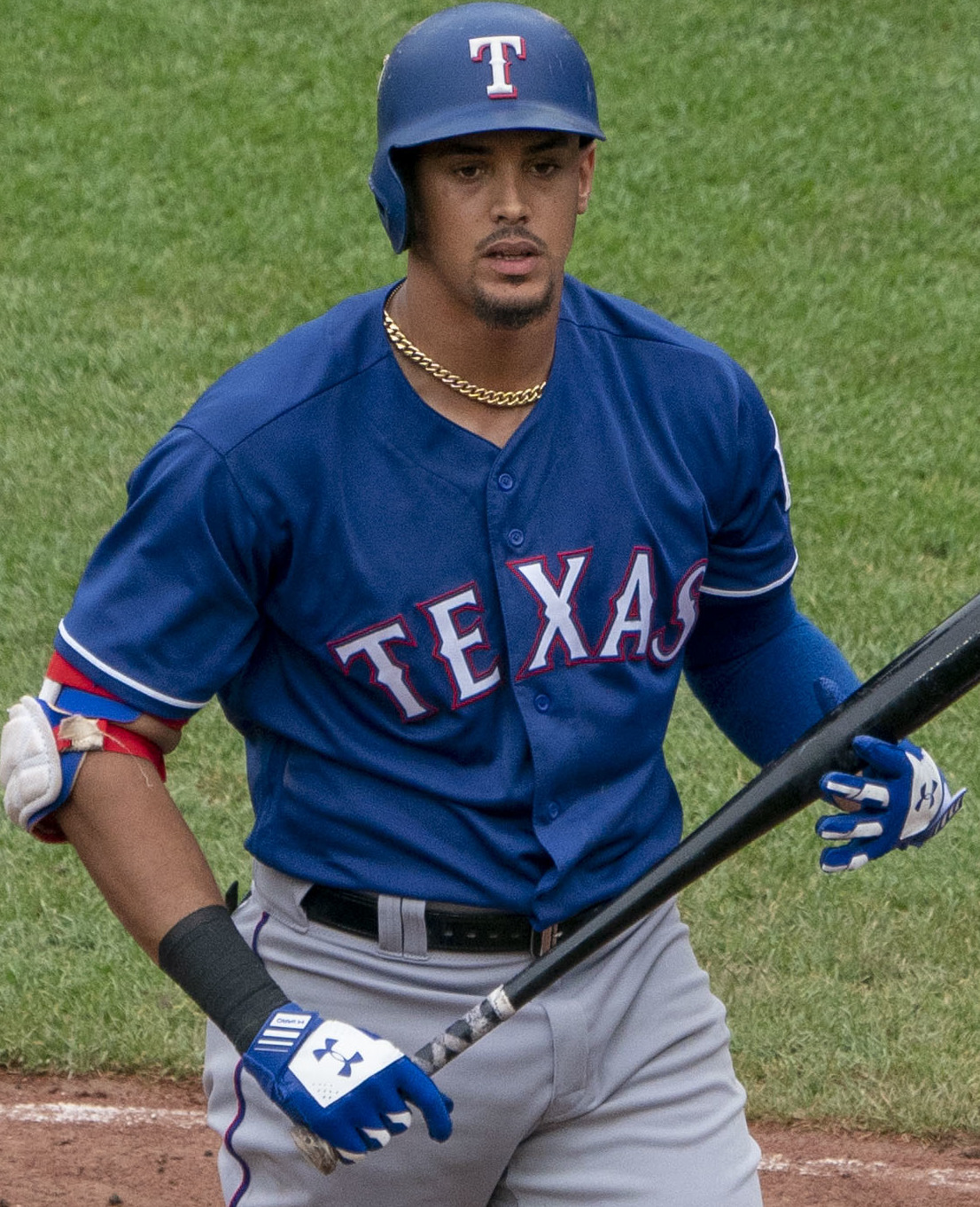
- Guzmán with the Texas Rangers in 2018

Free agent
- First baseman / Pitcher
- Born: October 20, 1994 (age 31); La Vega, Dominican Republic
- Bats: Left Throws: Left

MLB debut
- April 13, 2018, for the Texas Rangers

MLB statistics (through 2022 season)
- Batting average: .225
- Home runs: 31
- Runs batted in: 104
- Stats at Baseball Reference

Teams
- Texas Rangers (2018–2021); New York Yankees (2022)

Ronald Enmanuel Guzmán Cepeda (born October 20, 1994) is a Dominican professional baseball first baseman and pitcher who is currently a free agent. He has previously played in Major League Baseball (MLB) for the Texas Rangers and New York Yankees.

== Professional career ==
=== Texas Rangers ===
==== Minor leagues ====
Guzmán signed with the Texas Rangers as an international free agent in 2011, along with Nomar Mazara. He made his professional debut in 2012 with the Arizona League Rangers of the Rookie-level Arizona League. He played for the Hickory Crawdads of the Single–A South Atlantic League in 2013, 2014 and at the start of 2015. He finished 2015 with the High Desert Mavericks of the High–A California League and played in the Arizona Fall League after the season. In 2016, Guzmán played for the Frisco RoughRiders of the Double–A Texas League (102 games) and for the Round Rock Express of the Triple–A Pacific Coast League (25 games). He posted a combined stat line of .274/.333/.449/.782 with 16 home runs and 67 RBIs. In 2016 he was selected and appeared in the All-Star Futures Game. On November 18, 2016, the Rangers added Guzmán to their 40-man roster to protect him from the Rule 5 draft.

Guzmán spent the 2017 season with the Triple–A Round Rock Express, posting a stat line of .298/.372/.434/.806 with 12 home runs and 62 RBIs. After the 2017 season, the Rangers organization named him their 2017 Tom Grieve Player of the Year (minor league). Guzmán returned to the Round Rock Express to start the 2018 season, playing in 5 games with them before being recalled to the major leagues for the first time.

==== Major leagues ====
The Rangers promoted Guzmán to the major leagues on April 13, 2018. He hit his first major league home run on April 14, 2018, to tie a game against the Houston Astros in the top of the eighth inning. On August 10, 2018, he became the first rookie to ever hit three home runs against the New York Yankees in the Bronx. It was his father's first time seeing his son play in a professional game. Guzmán finished his rookie season with a .235/.306/.416/.722 batting line with 16 home runs and 58 RBIs in 123 games.

Coming out of spring training in 2019, Guzmán was named the Rangers' starting first baseman. However, he was placed on the 10-day injured list on April 7, 2019, with a right hamstring strain. He was reactivated off the IL on May 9, starting at first base that night. However, after posting a .193/.282/.396/.678 battling line during the first four months of the season, he was optioned to Triple-A Nashville on July 23. After slashing an impressive .316/.409/.518/.927 batting line at Nashville, he was called up on September 1 to become the Rangers' everyday first baseman. Guzmán would finish the 2019 season batting .219/.308/.414/.723 with 10 home runs and 36 RBIs in 87 games.

In 2020 for the Rangers, Guzmán appeared in 26 games, hitting .244/.314/.436 with four home runs and nine RBIs across 78 at-bats. After the 2020 season, he played for Gigantes del Cibao of the Dominican Professional Baseball League(LIDOM). He has also played for Dominican Republic in the 2021 Caribbean Series.

On April 12, 2021, his first career start in left field and the outfield, Guzmán tore the meniscus in his right knee and was placed on the 10-day injured list the next day. He had been batting .063/.118/.250 in 17 plate appearances at the time of his injury. On April 23, Guzmán underwent season-ending right knee surgery. On April 26, he was placed on the 60-day injured list. Guzmán was outrighted off of the 40-man roster on November 5, and elected free agency the following day.

=== New York Yankees ===
On March 13, 2022, Guzmán signed a minor league contract with the New York Yankees. He played for the Scranton/Wilkes-Barre RailRiders and began the conversion into a pitcher.

The Yankees promoted Guzmán to the major leagues on September 7. On September 10, Guzmán was designated for assignment after going 0-for-6 with 5 strikeouts in limited action. He cleared waivers and was sent outright to Triple–A Scranton on September 12. On October 24, Guzmán elected free agency.

=== San Francisco Giants ===
On January 16, 2023, Guzmán signed a minor league contract with the San Francisco Giants. On February 6, Guzmán was invited to Spring Training and announced as both a pitcher and infielder. On March 14, it was announced that Guzmán would miss 6–8 weeks after suffering a pronator strain in his left forearm. On August 20, Guzmán began a rehab assignment with the rookie–level Arizona Complex League Giants. After three games, he was released by the Giants organization on August 26.

=== Baltimore Orioles ===
On January 25, 2024, Guzmán signed a minor league contract with the Baltimore Orioles. In 8 games split between the rookie–level Florida Complex League Orioles and High–A Aberdeen IronBirds, he struggled to a 13.50 ERA with 11 strikeouts and one save across 7 1/3 innings pitched. Guzmán was released by the Orioles organization on October 5.

=== El Águila de Veracruz ===
On May 24, 2025, Guzmán signed with El Águila de Veracruz of the Mexican League. In 1 game he threw 0.1 innings giving up 3 earned runs (81.00 ERA) on 5 walks and striking out one, In 26 games in the field he hit .247/.348/.403 with 3 home runs and 12 RBIs.

Guzmán was not invited to the 2026 pre-season camp and has not appeared with the team again.

== Personal life ==
In 2014, Guzman was home in the Dominican Republic driving his vehicle when he collided with a motorcycle. The crash resulted in the death of the driver of the motorcycle. Guzman did not face any charges from the incident, as the police determined that the motorcycle driver had failed to stop at an intersection. Guzman has one daughter, named Charlotte with his girlfriend Yuleska De Carvalho.
