= Martín Pérez (baseball) =

Venezuelan baseball player (born 1991)

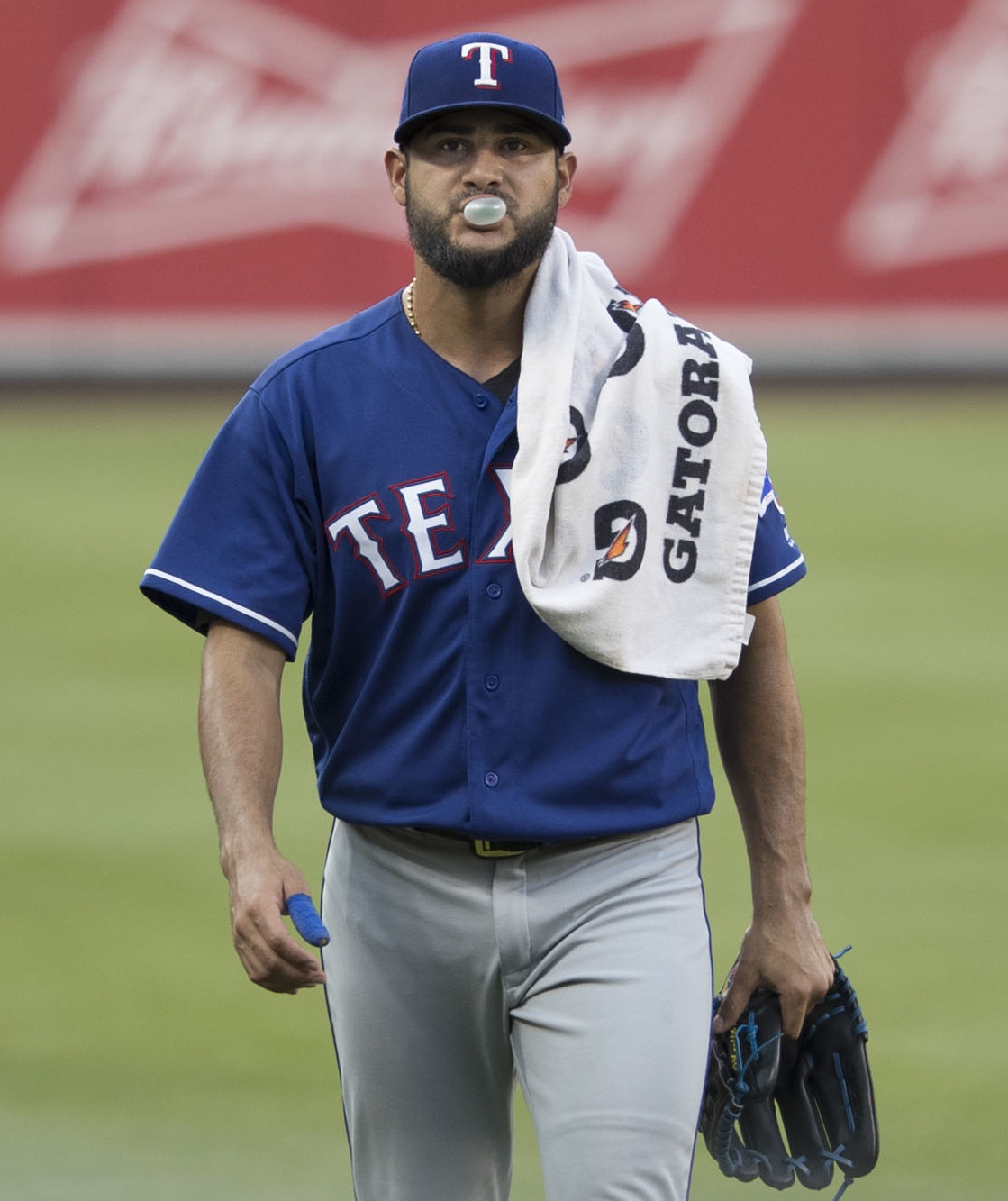
- Pérez with the Texas Rangers in 2017

Free agent
- Pitcher
- Born: April 4, 1991 (age 35); Guanare, Venezuela
- Bats: Left Throws: Left

MLB debut
- June 27, 2012, for the Texas Rangers

MLB statistics (through 2026 season)
- Win–loss record: 100–102
- Earned run average: 4.30
- Strikeouts: 1,255
- Stats at Baseball Reference

Teams
- Texas Rangers (2012–2018); Minnesota Twins (2019); Boston Red Sox (2020–2021); Texas Rangers (2022–2023); Pittsburgh Pirates (2024); San Diego Padres (2024); Chicago White Sox (2025); Atlanta Braves (2026)

Career highlights and awards
- All-Star (2022); World Series champion (2023)

Martín Pérez Jiménez (born April 4, 1991) is a Venezuelan professional baseball pitcher who is a free agent. He has played in Major League Baseball (MLB) for the Minnesota Twins, Boston Red Sox, Texas Rangers, Pittsburgh Pirates, San Diego Padres, Chicago White Sox, and Atlanta Braves. Pérez was an MLB All-Star in 2022 and won the 2023 World Series with the Rangers. Listed at 6 feet 0 inches and 210 pounds, he bats and throws left-handed.

== Professional career ==
=== Texas Rangers ===
The Texas Rangers signed Pérez in 2007 for $580,000 as an undrafted free agent. While only making 15 short starts in 62 innings at Rookie-level Spokane, Pérez went 1–2 with a 3.65 earned run average (ERA). Baseball America ranked Pérez as the #17 baseball prospect in their top 100 for 2010.

==== 2012 ====
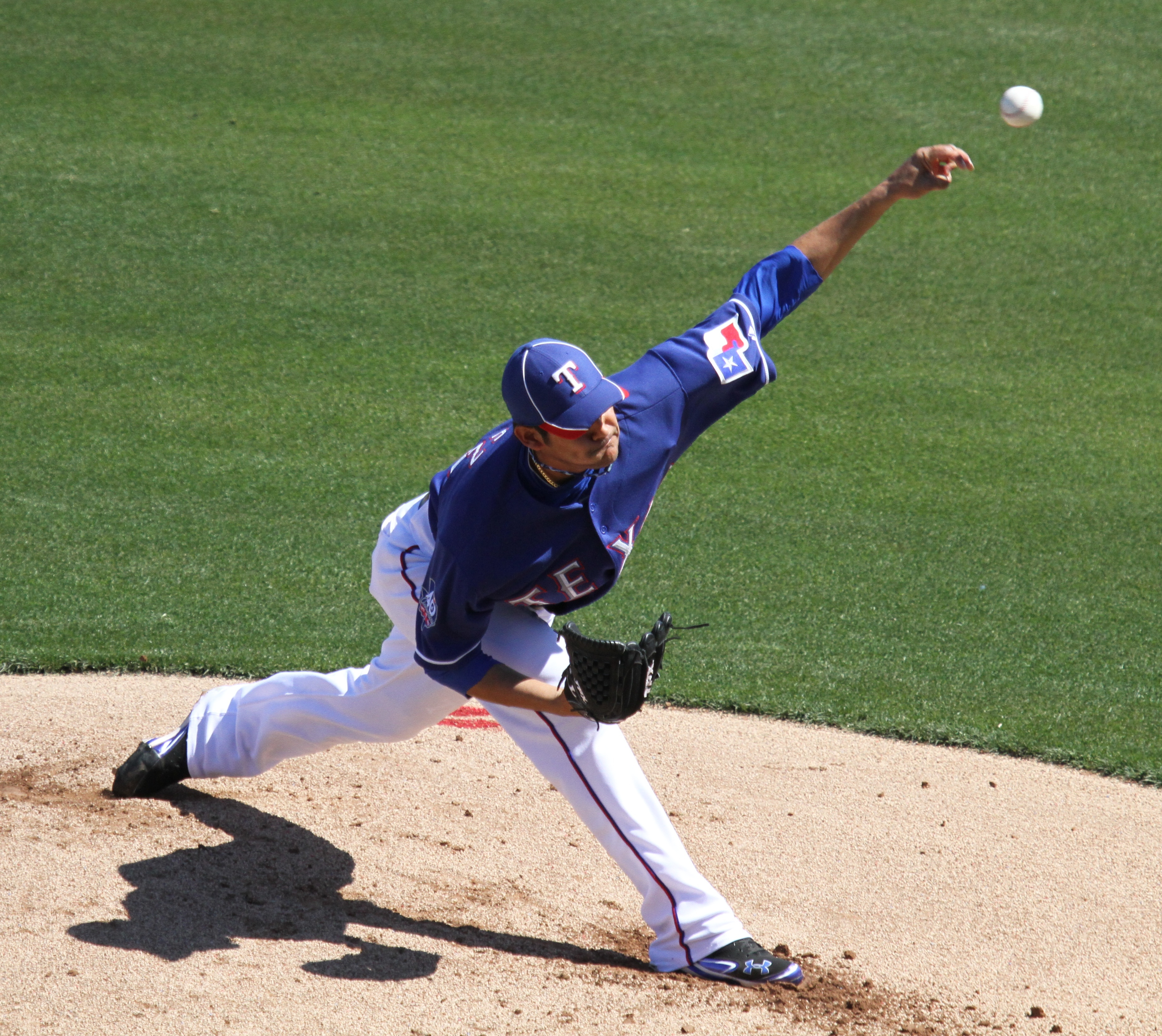
Pérez with Texas in 2012

On June 26, 2012, Pérez was called up by the Rangers. The next day he made his first major league appearance against the Detroit Tigers. He gave up 2 hits and 4 runs while striking out one over two-thirds of an inning. On June 30, Pérez made his first major league start, pitching 5 and a third innings and striking out five while only giving up two runs in a 7–2 win over the Oakland Athletics. On August 1, Pérez was optioned to Triple-A Round Rock to make room for pitcher Ryan Dempster.

==== 2013 ====
Pérez went into 2013 spring training competing for the fifth spot in the Rangers rotation (which eventually went to Nick Tepesch), but on March 3 in a start against the Mariners, he broke his pitching forearm when it was hit by a line drive by Brad Miller. After making 4 rehab starts (2 with Frisco, 2 with Round Rock), Pérez was recalled to make a start on May 27 in a doubleheader against the Diamondbacks. In his season debut, he went 5.1 innings, giving up 4 runs (3 earned) on 9 hits with 2 strikeouts. After the game, he was optioned to Round Rock. After 4 starts at Round Rock, he was recalled on June 22 to replace Josh Lindblom in the rotation. Pérez threw his first complete game on August 11 against the Houston Astros. In 20 starts with the Rangers, Pérez went 10–6 with a 3.62 ERA, striking out 84 in 124 1/3 innings.

On November 7, 2013, Pérez signed a four-year, $12.5 million contract with the Rangers that included three club options, keeping him under team control through 2020. He received a $1 million signing bonus, and was to earn $750,000 in 2014, $1 million in 2015, $2.9 million in 2016, and $4.4 million in 2017. The 2018 option was worth $6 million and had a $2.45 million buyout. The 2019 option was worth $7.5 million and had a $750,000 buyout. The 2020 option was worth $9 million and has a $750,000 buyout.

==== 2014 ====
On April 23, 2014, Pérez threw nine shutout innings against the Oakland A's to secure his second consecutive complete game shutout. After several ineffective starts following the shutouts, Pérez was placed on the disabled list due to inflammation in his pitching elbow. On May 19, 2014, Pérez underwent Tommy John surgery to repair a partially torn UCL in the aforementioned elbow, which kept him out of action for the remainder of 2014.

==== 2015 ====
Pérez began the 2015 season on the 60-day disabled list to continue recovery from Tommy John surgery. He returned to the active roster in July.

==== 2016 ====
Pérez had his first major league hit on July 15, 2016, against Chicago Cubs' pitcher Kyle Hendricks. He hit a single to Kris Bryant. He had been hitless his first nine at bats. In 2016 he was 10–11 and had the fewest strikeouts per 9 innings in the major leagues (4.67). He had more batters reach base against him on errors, 16, than any other pitcher in the major leagues.

==== 2017 ====
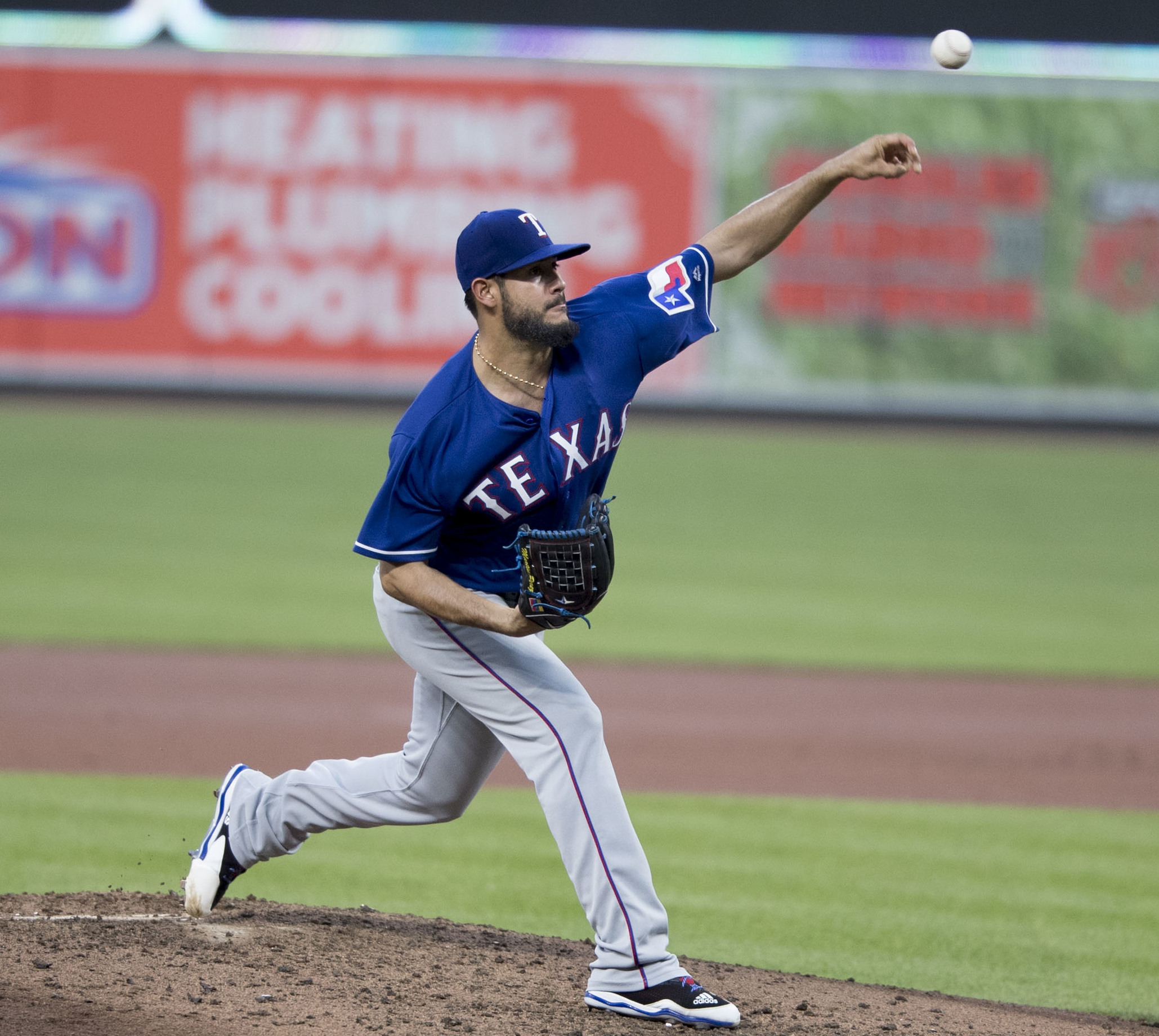
Pérez delivers a pitch for the Rangers in 2017

In 2017, Pérez was 13–12 with a 4.32 ERA, and had the highest WHIP among major league pitchers (1.48). He also had the highest line drive percentage allowed (24.8%) of all major league pitchers.

==== 2018 ====
On April 30, 2018, Pérez was placed on the disabled list with discomfort in his right elbow. He was activated on July 14, replacing Alex Claudio, who was placed on the disabled list. In 2018, he was 2–7 with a 6.22 ERA.

=== Minnesota Twins ===
On January 30, 2019, Pérez signed a one-year contract with the Minnesota Twins. He was expected to compete for the fifth spot in the starting rotation.

During the 2019 season, he made 32 appearances with 29 starts, with a WHIP of 1.52, the highest in the major leagues. He compiled a 10–7 record in 165 1/3 innings pitched. After the season, he became a free agent.

=== Boston Red Sox ===
==== 2020 ====
On December 19, 2019, Pérez signed a one-year contract with the Boston Red Sox; the contract also included a team option for the 2021 season. Overall with the 2020 Red Sox, Pérez appeared in 12 games (all starts), compiling a 3–5 record with 4.50 ERA and 46 strikeouts in 62 innings pitched. He led the AL in walks per nine innings pitched, with 4.1, and in lowest strikeout/walk ratio, at 1.64. On November 1, the Red Sox declined to exercise their $6.85 million option for Pérez for the 2021 season, paying him a $500,000 buyout and making him a free agent.

==== 2021 ====
On February 12, 2021, Pérez officially re-signed with the Red Sox on a one-year, $4.5 million contract. On February 17, MLB.com mistakenly announced that Perez would be switching his uniform number to 33, which had not been issued by the Red Sox since Jason Varitek's retirement in 2012; Pérez clarified that this was an error and that he had no intention of changing numbers. He began the season in the Red Sox rotation, then was moved to the bullpen in early August. On August 30, Pérez was placed on the COVID-related injured list; he returned to the team on September 14. Overall during the regular season, Pérez made 36 appearances (22 starts) for Boston, compiling a 7–8 record with 4.74 ERA; he struck out 97 batters in 114 innings. In the postseason, he made four relief appearances against Houston in the American League Championship Series, allowing five runs in three innings. On November 7, the team declined to exercise their $6 million option on Pérez for 2022, making him a free agent again.

=== Texas Rangers (second stint) ===
==== 2022 ====
On March 14, 2022, Pérez signed a one-year, $4 million contract with the Texas Rangers. On May 29, Pérez took perfect game bid versus the Houston Astros into the seventh inning until Chas McCormick led off with a double. Pérez was selected as an American League All-Star in 2022. Over 32 starts in 2022, he posted a 12–8 record with a 2.89 ERA and 169 strikeouts over 196 1/3 innings.

==== 2023 ====
On November 15, 2022, Pérez accepted a one-year qualifying offer worth $19.65 million to return to Texas for the 2023 season. The Rangers went on to win the 2023 World Series, giving Perez his first championship.

=== Pittsburgh Pirates ===
On January 5, 2024, the Pittsburgh Pirates signed Pérez to a one-year contract worth $8 million. In 16 starts for Pittsburgh, Pérez compiled a 2–5 record and 5.20 ERA with 63 strikeouts across 83 innings pitched.

=== San Diego Padres ===
On July 30, 2024, the Pirates traded Pérez to the San Diego Padres in exchange for pitcher Ronaldys Jimenez. In 10 starts for San Diego, Pérez posted a 3–1 record and 3.46 ERA with 44 strikeouts across 52 innings pitched.

=== Chicago White Sox ===
On January 21, 2025, Pérez signed a one-year, $5 million contract with the Chicago White Sox. On April 19, he was placed on the injured list with inflammation in his throwing elbow. Two days later, Pérez was transferred to the 60-day injured list. On April 22, it was announced that he would miss the majority of the year due to a flexor strain. Pérez was activated from the injured list on August 12. In 11 total appearances (10 starts) for Chicago, he posted a 1–6 record and 3.54 ERA with 44 strikeouts across 56 innings of work. On September 19, Pérez was placed on the injured list due to a shoulder strain, officially ending his season. He declined the 2026 option in his contract and became a free agent on November 4.

=== Atlanta Braves ===
On January 30, 2026, Pérez signed a minor league contract with the Atlanta Braves. He did not make the Opening Day roster, but agreed to stay with the organization. On March 30, the Braves selected Pérez's contract, adding him to their active roster. In three appearances for Atlanta, he compiled a 0–1 record with 3.14 ERA and six strikeouts in 14 1/3 innings pitched. On April 12, Pérez was designated for assignment. He elected free agency after clearing waivers on April 14. Pérez re-signed with the Braves organization on a minor league contract the following day. He was selected to the active roster on April 17. On September 15, Pérez earned the 100th win of his career after pitching six innings and allowing two runs against the Chicago Cubs.

== International career ==
Pérez has represented Venezuela twice in the World Baseball Classic. In 2017, he started two games and pitched six innings, giving up six runs and earning an ERA of 7.50. He earned a loss in Venezuela's 13−2 defeat against Puerto Rico in the second round, their final game in the tournament before being eliminated. Pérez returned to play for Venezuela in 2023, pitching in 3 2/3 innings in which he allowed four runs. The team was eliminated in the quarterfinals, losing to the United States 9−7.

== Pitching style ==
Pérez features a four-seam fastball that is regularly clocked at 93 miles per hour (150 km/h), a sharp breaking curveball, and a change-up. His velocity is not that of a power pitcher, but his pitches have good movement. In 2007, when he was first signed by the Rangers, he was likened to be a cross between Johan Santana and Greg Maddux.

== See also ==
- List of Major League Baseball annual shutout leaders
- List of Major League Baseball players from Venezuela
- Texas Rangers award winners and league leaders
