= Jay Loviglio =

American baseball player (born 1956)

- Second baseman
- Born: May 30, 1956 (age 69); Freeport, New York, U.S.
- Batted: Right Threw: Right

MLB debut
- September 2, 1980, for the Philadelphia Phillies

Last MLB appearance
- July 26, 1983, for the Chicago Cubs

MLB statistics
- Batting average: .192
- Hits: 10
- Runs batted in: 4
- Stats at Baseball Reference

Teams
- Philadelphia Phillies (1980); Chicago White Sox (1981–1982); Chicago Cubs (1983)

John Paul Loviglio (born May 30, 1956) is an American former professional baseball second baseman who played for the Philadelphia Phillies (1980), Chicago White Sox (1981–82), and Chicago Cubs (1983). After his playing days, he began a minor league coaching/managing career.

Loviglio grew up in East Islip, New York and attended East Islip High School where he played baseball and football. He played college baseball at Suffolk County Community College. After losing a playoff game against Farmingdale State College in his second season, Loviglio thought that his playing days were done, as his grades were not good enough to transfer to a four-year school. However, he was invited to a tryout with the Philadelphia Phillies at Eisenhower Park the next day. He impressed scouts and was assigned to the New York–Penn League.

== Sources ==
- Career statistics from Baseball Reference · Baseball Reference (Minors) · Retrosheet
