= Hanser Alberto =

Dominican baseball player (born 1992)

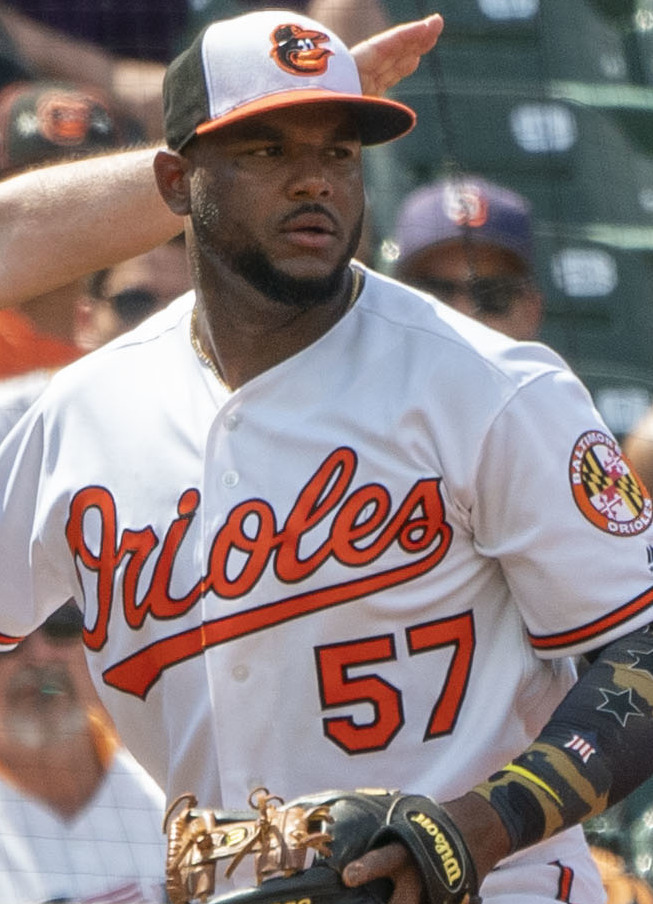
- Alberto with the Baltimore Orioles in 2019
- Infielder
- Born: October 17, 1992 (age 34); San Francisco de Macorís, Dominican Republic
- Batted: Right Threw: Right

MLB debut
- May 29, 2015, for the Texas Rangers

Last MLB appearance
- May 31, 2023, for the Chicago White Sox

MLB statistics
- Batting average: .269
- Home runs: 22
- Runs batted in: 137
- Stats at Baseball Reference

Teams
- Texas Rangers (2015–2016, 2018); Baltimore Orioles (2019–2020); Kansas City Royals (2021); Los Angeles Dodgers (2022); Chicago White Sox (2023)

Hanser Joel Alberto Peña (born October 17, 1992) is a Dominican former professional baseball infielder. He played in Major League Baseball (MLB) for the Texas Rangers, Baltimore Orioles, Kansas City Royals, Los Angeles Dodgers, and Chicago White Sox.

== Career ==
=== Texas Rangers ===
Alberto signed as an international free agent with the Texas Rangers in November 2009, receiving a $75,000 signing bonus. Playing for the Dominican Summer Rangers of the Rookie-level Dominican Summer League in 2010, he won the batting title. Alberto began the 2013 season with the Frisco RoughRiders of the Double-A Texas League, but struggled, and was demoted to the Myrtle Beach Pelicans of the High-A Carolina League. He returned to Frisco in 2014, and won the Rawlings Minor League Gold Glove Award as the best defensive shortstop in minor league baseball.

The Rangers promoted Alberto to the major leagues on May 28, 2015; he made his debut the next day against the Boston Red Sox. He went 1-for-3 with a run batted in (RBI) triple in his debut. He made the Rangers postseason roster and batted .200 with two RBIs in the 2015 American League Division Series against the Toronto Blue Jays, including recording the game winning RBI in Game 2 of that series. He split the 2016 season between the Triple-A Round Rock Express and Texas. Alberto playing in only five games in 2017 due to shoulder injuries. On December 1, 2017, Alberto was non-tendered by the Rangers, making him a free agent.

On December 14, 2017, Alberto re-signed with the Rangers organization on a minor league contract. He split the 2018 season between the Rangers and Round Rock.

=== Baltimore Orioles ===
Alberto bounced around and was claimed off waivers several times during the offseason following the 2018 campaign. Alberto was claimed from the Rangers by the New York Yankees on November 2, 2018, but was then designated for assignment on January 11, 2019, as a result of the Yankees re-signing Zack Britton. A few hours later, the Orioles claimed him off waivers, but on February 19, the team designated him for assignment to make room for Josh Osich. Three days later, on February 22, he was claimed by the San Francisco Giants, but after only a week with the team, he rejoined the Orioles on March 1.

Alberto was pressed into service as a relief pitcher in the ninth inning of a 15–3 loss to the New York Yankees at Camden Yards on April 7, 2019. With the score 13–3, he hit a batter, surrendered a two-run homer, walked a pair and got a force out and two flyouts. He joined teammates Renato Núñez and Anthony Santander as the third Oriole within a three-week span to achieve his own first-ever five-hit game in a 14–2 win over the Kansas City Royals at Kauffman Stadium on August 30, 2019. This occurred within a calendar month for the first time since Wally Moses, Frankie Hayes and Lou Finney did it with the Philadelphia Athletics in July 1936.

Alberto enjoyed a career year offensively, hitting .305/.329/.422 with 12 home runs and 51 runs batted in. He had the lowest strikeout percentage in baseball (9.1%), led the majors in at bats per strikeout (10.5), and led the American League in bunt hits (9). He also swung at the highest percentage of pitches outside the strike zone of all American League batters (47.6%), and had the lowest Hard Contact Percentage of all major league batters, at 24.6%.

In 2020 for the Orioles, Alberto slashed .283/.306/.393 with three home runs and 22 RBIs. He was non-tendered by the Orioles on December 2, 2020, and was released the same day. He had been expected to get a $2–4 million raise in his first year of arbitration eligibility.

=== Kansas City Royals ===
On January 31, 2021, Alberto signed a minor league contract with the Kansas City Royals organization. On March 29, 2021, Alberto was selected to the 40-man roster. Alberto played in 103 games for the Royals, hitting .270 with two home runs and 24 RBIs. On October 29, Alberto elected free agency.

=== Los Angeles Dodgers ===
On March 23, 2022, Alberto signed a one-year contract for $1.6 million with the Los Angeles Dodgers. The deal contained a $2 million option for 2023. In his eighth pitching appearance of the season on September 3, Alberto recorded his first career pitching strikeout, punching out San Diego Padres first baseman Josh Bell. Alberto played every infield position plus right field, appearing in 73 games and batting .244 with two homers and 15 RBIs. He also pitched in 10 games, allowing five runs in 11 innings and setting a major league record for most pitching appearances by a position player in a season. On November 8, 2022, the Dodgers declined Alberto's 2023 option, making him a free agent.

=== Chicago White Sox ===
On January 11, 2023, Alberto signed a minor league contract with the Chicago White Sox organization. He had his contract selected on March 30. On April 3, Alberto made his first pitching appearance of the season in a blowout loss against the San Francisco Giants, and recorded a strikeout of catcher Roberto Pérez. In 30 games for the White Sox, Alberto batted .220/.261/.390 with three home runs and 16 RBI. On June 2, Alberto was designated for assignment. On June 4, Alberto was placed on unconditional release waivers.

=== Piratas de Campeche ===
On January 24, 2025, Alberto signed with the Piratas de Campeche of the Mexican League. In 26 appearances for Campeche, Alberto batted .238/.257/.436 with five home runs and 13 RBI.

=== Saraperos de Saltillo ===
On July 2, 2025, Alberto was traded to the Saraperos de Saltillo of the Mexican League. In one appearance for Saltillo, he went 1-for-4 (.250). Alberto was released by the Saraperos on January 24, 2026 and subsequently announced his retirement.
