= Ricardo Rodríguez (baseball, born 1992) =

Venezuelan baseball player (born 1992)

Leones de Yucatán – No. 68
- Pitcher
- Born: August 31, 1992 (age 33); Maracay, Venezuela
- Bats: Right Throws: Right

MLB debut
- August 14, 2017, for the Texas Rangers

MLB statistics (through 2018 season)
- Win–loss record: 0–1
- Earned run average: 5.49
- Strikeouts: 14
- Stats at Baseball Reference

Teams
- Texas Rangers (2017–2018)

Ricardo José Rodríguez (born August 31, 1992) is a Venezuelan professional baseball pitcher for the Leones de Yucatán of the Mexican League. He has previously played in Major League Baseball (MLB) for the Texas Rangers.

== Professional career ==
=== Texas Rangers ===
Rodríguez signed with the Texas Rangers as an international free agent on November 20, 2010. He made his professional debut in 2011 for the DSL Rangers, posting a 4–1 record with a 4.05 ERA in 20 innings. He repeated with the DSL Rangers in 2012, posting a 3–3 record with a 2.87 ERA in 47 innings. Rodríguez split the 2013 season between the DSL Rangers, the AZL Rangers of the Rookie-level Arizona League, and the Spokane Indians of the Low–A Northwest League; posting a combined 0–4 record with a 3.09 ERA in 32 innings between the three levels. In 2014, he spent the season with the Hickory Crawdads of the Single–A South Atlantic League, going 5–5 with a 3.07 ERA in 102 2/3 innings (29 games - 12 starts).

Rodríguez appeared in five games for the Hickory and in two games for the Round Rock Express of the Triple-A Pacific Coast League, before he underwent season-ending Tommy John surgery in 2015. The surgery also caused him to miss the entire 2016 season rehabilitating. He began the 2017 season with the Down East Wood Ducks of the High–A Carolina League and was later promoted to the Frisco RoughRiders of the Double–A Texas League. In 35 combined games, he posted a 5–1 record with a 1.34 ERA and 61 strikeouts over 47 innings.

The Rangers promoted Rodríguez to the major leagues on August 8, 2017, becoming the first Wood Duck to be promoted to the major leagues. Rodriguez made his debut on August 14, 2017, in a game against the Detroit Tigers, pitching one scoreless inning. He recorded his first career strikeout against Tigers batter James McCann and struck out the next batter, Alex Presley, as well. He ended the 2017 season after posting a 0–1 record with a 6.23 ERA over 13 innings in 16 games for Texas.

Rodríguez started the 2018 season on the 60–day disabled list with right biceps tendinitis and elbow inflammation. He rehabbed with Frisco and Round Rock before being activated off the DL and optioned to Round Rock. Between the two levels, he posted a combined 1–2 record with a 2.51 ERA and 28 strikeouts over 28 2/3 innings. He recorded a 0–0 record with a 4.05 ERA in 6 2/3 major league innings in 2018.

On November 30, 2018, Rodríguez was non-tendered by the Rangers and was granted free agency. Rodríguez was re-signed to a minor-league contract on February 5, 2019. It was also announced that Rodríguez had undergone shoulder surgery in December 2018, which caused him to miss the entire 2019 season.

=== Toros de Tijuana ===
On April 18, 2023, Rodríguez signed with the Toros de Tijuana of the Mexican League. In 37 relief outings for the Toros, he posted a 2.61 ERA with 38 strikeouts across 38 innings pitched. Rodríguez was released by Tijuana on March 19, 2024.

On May 16, 2024, Rodríguez re–signed with Tijuana. In 11 relief appearances, he posted a 3.27 ERA with four strikeouts across 11 innings pitched.

=== El Águila de Veracruz ===
On July 5, 2024, Rodríguez was traded to El Águila de Veracruz of the Mexican League. In 7 relief appearances, he gave up only five hits and no earned runs across 7 1/3 innings. Rodríguez was released by Veracruz on January 6, 2025.

=== Leones de Yucatán ===
On January 17, 2026, Rodríguez signed with the Leones de Yucatán of the Mexican League.
