= Yohander Méndez =

Venezuelan baseball player (born 1995)

Free agent
- Pitcher
- Born: January 17, 1995 (age 31); Valencia, Venezuela
- Bats: Left Throws: Left

Professional debut
- MLB: September 5, 2016, for the Texas Rangers
- NPB: April 5, 2023, for the Yomiuri Giants
- CPBL: April 2, 2025, for the Uni-President Lions

MLB statistics (through 2019 season)
- Win–loss record: 3–3
- Earned run average: 6.23
- Strikeouts: 33

NPB statistics (through 2024 season)
- Win–loss record: 5–7
- Earned run average: 2.56
- Strikeouts: 76

CPBL statistics (through 2025 season)
- Win–loss record: 10–6
- Earned run average: 3.51
- Strikeouts: 97
- Stats at Baseball Reference

Teams
- Texas Rangers (2016–2019); Yomiuri Giants (2023–2024); Uni-President Lions (2025)

Yohander Manuel Méndez Ortega (born January 17, 1995) is a Venezuelan professional baseball pitcher who is a free agent. He has previously played in Major League Baseball (MLB) for the Texas Rangers, in Nippon Professional Baseball (NPB) for the Yomiuri Giants, and in the Chinese Professional Baseball League (CPBL) for the Uni-President Lions. He made his MLB debut in 2016.

== Professional career ==
=== Texas Rangers ===
Méndez signed with the Texas Rangers as an international free agent on June 1, 2012 out of Venezuela for $1.5 million. Méndez made his professional debut in 2012 with the Dominican Summer League Rangers, posting a 2–1 record with a 1.99 ERA in 45 1/3 innings. In 2013 he made his stateside debut with the Low–A Spokane Indians, posting a 1–2 record with a 3.78 ERA in 33 1/3 innings. Méndez split the 2014 season between the rookie–level Arizona League Rangers and Single–A Hickory Crawdads, posting a combined 3–1 record with a 2.70 ERA in 36 2/3 innings. Méndez spent the entire 2015 season with the Hickory Crawdads, posting a 3–3 with a 2.44 ERA in 66 1/3 innings. On November 20, 2015, the Rangers added him to their 40-man roster to protect him from the Rule 5 draft. Méndez split the 2016 minor league season between the High–A High Desert Mavericks, Double–A Frisco RoughRiders, and Triple–A Round Rock Express. He posted a combined 12–3 record with a 2.19 ERA in 111 innings. After the trade deadline of the 2016 season, Mendez became the team's no. 2 prospect after the Rangers dealt Luis Ortiz and Lewis Brinson to the Brewers for catcher Jonathan Lucroy.

Méndez was promoted to the Major Leagues during September call-ups on September 2, 2016 after having an ERA of 2.19 as a starter in the minors. He made his Major League debut on September 5, coming out of the bullpen and allowing five earned runs while pitching one inning against the Seattle Mariners. Méndez appeared in just two games that September, tossing 3 innings with a 18.00 ERA.

Mendez split the 2017 season between Double–A Frisco and the Rangers. In 24 starts with Frisco, he posted a 7–8 with a 3.79 ERA and 124 strikeouts across 137 2/3 innings. In 7 relief outings for the Rangers, he posted a 0–1 record with a 5.11 ERA and 7 strikeouts over 12 1/3 innings.

Méndez opened the 2018 season with Triple–A Round Rock. He was on the Rangers active roster when on June 19, he was optioned back to Triple–A for violating an unspecified team rule after a game in Kansas City the night prior. Mendez was demoted down to the High–A Down East Wood Ducks on June 25, for what the organization called a "reset" on his development. Méndez worked his way back up through Double–A and Triple–A, before being recalled to the major league roster on September 2. Méndez posted a combined 2–10 record with a 4.71 ERA in 122 1/3 innings between Down East, Frisco, and Round Rock. In 8 games (5 starts) with the Rangers in 2018, Méndez posted a 2–2 record with a 5.53 ERA in 27 2/3 innings. During the 2018 offseason the Rangers announced that they were given a 4th minor league option on Méndez that would allow them to option him to the minor leagues during the 2019 season. On March 19, 2019, the team announced that Méndez would not need season–ending surgery, instead he would be available by midseason. Méndez was placed on the 60-day injured list to open the 2019 season. He returned to Texas on September 5, and finished the season going 1–0 with a 5.79 ERA over 4 2/3 innings.

On July 23, 2020, Méndez was removed from the 40–man roster and sent outright to Round Rock. He did not play in a game in 2020 due to the cancellation of the minor league season because of the COVID-19 pandemic. Méndez became a free agent on November 2.

=== Sultanes de Monterrey ===
On February 24, 2021, Méndez signed with the Leones de Yucatán of the Mexican League. He did not appear for Yucatán during the 2021 season.

On December 6, 2021, Méndez signed with the Milwaukee Milkmen of the American Association of Professional Baseball. However, on February 15, 2022, prior to the 2022 AA season, his contract was purchased by the Sultanes de Monterrey of the Mexican League.

=== Yomiuri Giants ===
On December 13, 2022, Méndez signed with the Yomiuri Giants of Nippon Professional Baseball. He made 16 appearances for Yomiuri in 2023, he compiled a 5–5 record and 2.07 ERA with 72 strikeouts over 87 innings pitched. Méndez re-signed with the Giants on a one-year contract for the 2024 season on November 26, 2023.

Méndez only appeared in 2 games for Yomiuri in 2024, going 0–2 and striking out 4 batters over 4 1/3 innings pitched. On October 6, 2024, it was announced that the Giants would not retain Méndez for the 2025 season, making him a free agent.

=== Uni-President Lions ===
On December 27, 2024, Méndez signed a one-year, $560,000 contract with the Uni-President Lions of the Chinese Professional Baseball League. In 22 starts, he registered a 10–6 record with a 3.51 ERA, 97 strikeouts, and 50 walks over 120 2/3 innings pitched. Méndez became a free agent following the season.

=== Sultanes de Monterrey (second stint) ===
On February 20, 2026, Méndez signed with the Sultanes de Monterrey of the Mexican League. In six appearances (four starts) for the Sultanes, he struggled to a 0–3 record with a 9.16 ERA, 21 strikeouts, and 11 walks across 18 2/3 innings of work. On May 22, Méndez was released by Monterrey.

=== Leones de Yucatán ===
On May 28, 2026, Méndez signed with the Leones de Yucatán of the Mexican League. He debuted the same day, giving up five hits and three earned runs in two innings pitched. Méndez was released by the Leones the following day.

== See also ==
- List of Major League Baseball players from Venezuela
