= Nomar Mazara =

Dominican baseball player (born 1995)

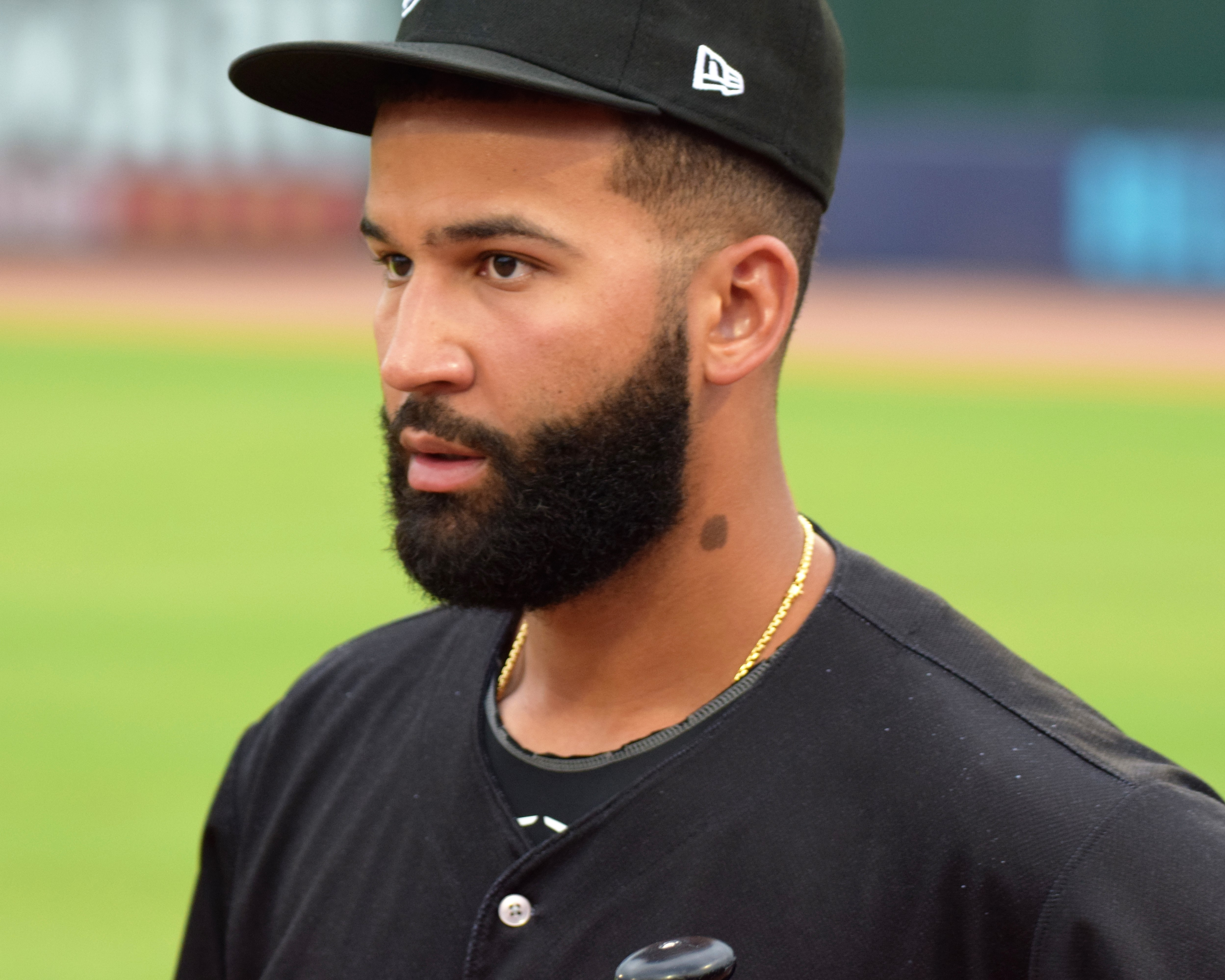
- Mazara with the El Paso Chihuahuas in 2022

Free agent
- Right fielder
- Born: April 26, 1995 (age 31); Santo Domingo, Dominican Republic
- Batted: Left Threw: Left

MLB debut
- April 10, 2016, for the Texas Rangers

Last MLB appearance
- August 19, 2022, for the San Diego Padres

MLB statistics
- Batting average: .256
- Home runs: 85
- Runs batted in: 360
- Stats at Baseball Reference

Teams
- Texas Rangers (2016–2019); Chicago White Sox (2020); Detroit Tigers (2021); San Diego Padres (2022)

Nomar Shamir Mazara Jiminián (born April 26, 1995) is a Dominican professional baseball right fielder who is a free agent. He played in Major League Baseball (MLB) for the Texas Rangers, Chicago White Sox, Detroit Tigers, and San Diego Padres.

== Professional career ==
=== Texas Rangers ===
==== Minor leagues ====
Mazara signed with the Texas Rangers as an international free agent to a $5 million signing bonus in July 2011; the bonus was a record for a non-American prospect. He made his professional debut with the Arizona Rangers of the Rookie-level Arizona League in 2012, and compiled a.264 batting average, .383 on-base percentage, .448 slugging percentage, and six home runs in 54 games. In 2013, Mazara played in 126 games for the Hickory Crawdads of the Single—A South Atlantic League, hitting .236 with a .310 on-base percentage, .382 slugging percentage, and 13 home runs. Mazara returned to Hickory to start the 2014 season. In August, he was promoted to the Frisco RoughRiders of the Double–A Texas League, skipping the High–A level. Mazara began the 2015 season with Frisco, and was promoted to the Round Rock Express of the Triple–A Pacific Coast League (PCL) on August 17. The Rangers added him to their 40-man roster after the 2015 season to protect him from being eligible to be selected in the Rule 5 draft.

==== 2016 ====
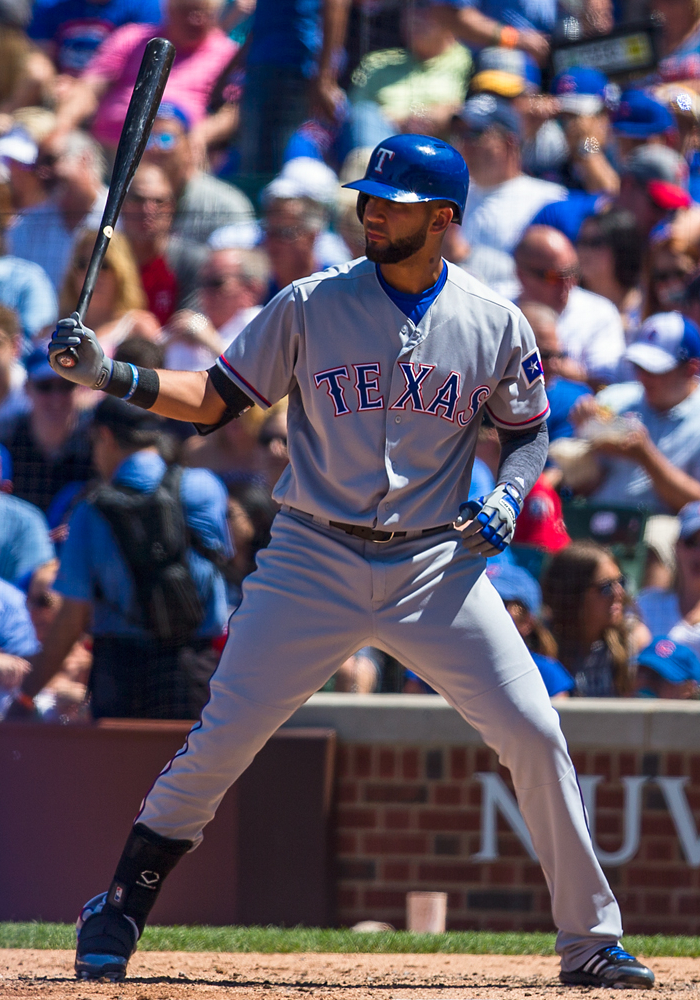
Mazara takes the plate for the Rangers in 2016

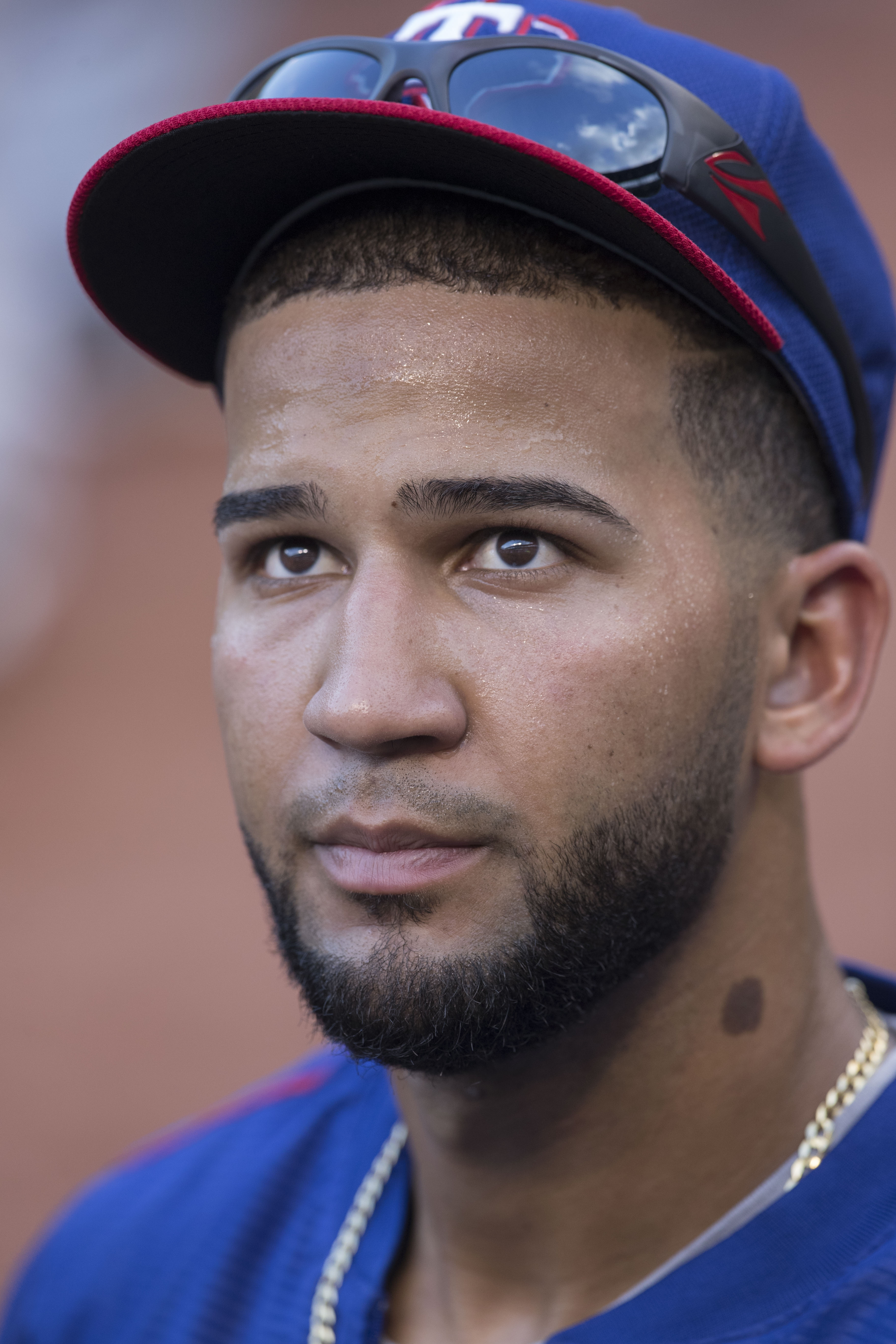
Mazara with the Rangers in 2016

Mazara began the 2016 season in Triple-A Round Rock. The Rangers promoted Mazara to the major leagues on April 10, following an injury to Shin-Soo Choo. In his MLB debut, Mazara batted second and hit a single off of Jered Weaver of the Los Angeles Angels of Anaheim in his first at bat to get his first major league hit. Mazara followed that up with another single, and in his third at bat, his first major league home run off of Weaver. Mazara provided the only run for the Rangers in his debut, going 3-for-4. Mazara batted .333 in April, and won the American League Rookie of the Month Award. On May 25, 2016, Mazara hit a massive 491-foot home run off of Angels starter Hector Santiago. Mazara continued to bat over .300 for the month of May and he yet again won the American League Rookie of the Month.

==== 2017 ====
To begin play in 2017, Mazara hit .417 with 2 home runs and 9 RBI's, one of those home runs being his first career Grand Slam which was hit on April 7 against the Oakland Athletics, propelling him to the American League Player of the Week. Mazara finished the 2017 season with a batting line of: .253/.323/.422/.745 with 20 home runs and a team leading 101 RBI.

==== 2018 ====
In 2018, Mazara posted a batting line of .258/.317/.436/.753 with 20 home runs and 77 RBI. Mazara landed on the disabled list from July 20 to August 16 with a right thumb sprain. The injury lingered and hampered Mazara through the end of the season, but did not require surgery to fix.

==== 2019 ====
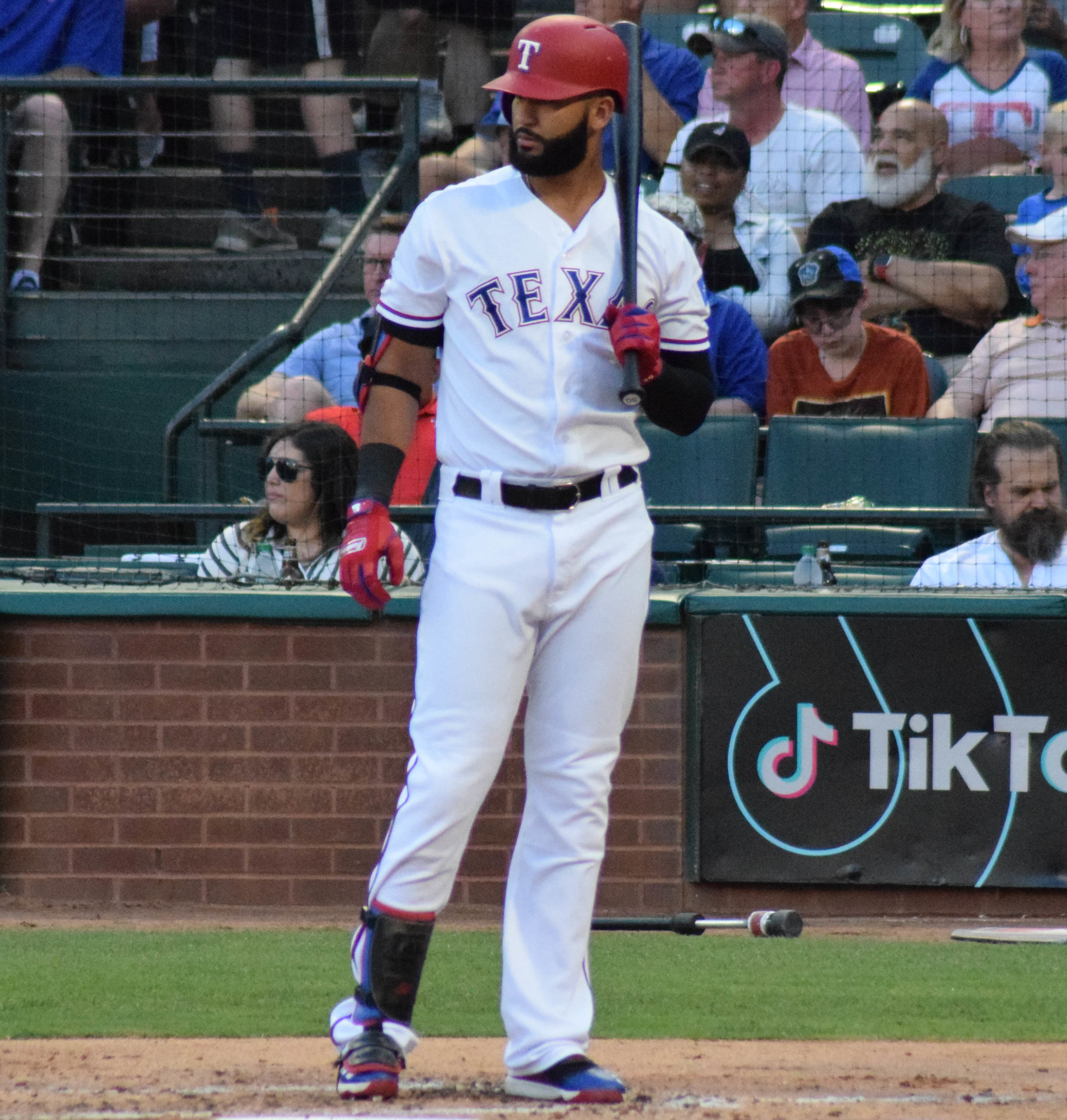
Mazara with the Rangers in 2019

On June 21, 2019, Mazara hit a home run estimated at 505 feet off of Reynaldo López of the Chicago White Sox, the longest home run hit by any major leaguer in 2019. In 2019, Mazara hit .268/.318/.469/.786 with 19 home runs and 66 RBIs.

=== Chicago White Sox ===
On December 11, 2019, Mazara was traded to the Chicago White Sox in exchange for Steele Walker. Overall with the 2020 Chicago White Sox, Mazara batted .228 with one home run and 15 RBI in 42 games. On December 2, Mazara was non-tendered by the White Sox.

=== Detroit Tigers ===
On February 11, 2021, Mazara signed a one-year deal with the Detroit Tigers worth $1.75 million plus incentives. On March 27, Tigers manager A. J. Hinch announced that Mazara had made the team's opening day roster. Mazara played in 50 games for Detroit, slashing .212/.276/.321 with 3 home runs and 19 RBI. He was designated for assignment by the Tigers on July 16. He was released by Detroit on July 23.

=== San Diego Padres ===
On December 16, 2021, Mazara signed a minor league contract with the San Diego Padres. He began the 2022 season with the El Paso Chihuahuas of the PCL. The Padres promoted Mazara to the major leagues on June 2. The Padres designated Mazara for assignment on August 20. He cleared waivers and elected free agency on August 23, 2022.

=== Washington Nationals ===
On December 6, 2022, Mazara signed a minor league contract with the Baltimore Orioles organization. Mazara was released by the Orioles on March 27, 2023.

On April 14, 2023, Mazara signed a minor league contract with the Washington Nationals and was assigned to the Triple-A Rochester Red Wings. In 47 appearances for Rochester, he batted .266/.360/.410 with five home runs and 22 RBI. Mazara was released by the Nationals organization on July 23.

=== Sultanes de Monterrey ===
On March 1, 2024, Mazara signed with the Sultanes de Monterrey of the Mexican League. In 70 games for the Sultanes, he batted .307/.390/.496 with nine home runs, 49 RBI, and three stolen bases.

=== El Águila de Veracruz ===
On February 25, 2025, Mazara was traded to El Águila de Veracruz of the Mexican League. In 40 appearances for Veracruz, he batted .275/.394/.399 with three home runs and 19 RBI. Mazara was released by the team on June 16.
