= 2019 Toronto Blue Jays season =

2019 Toronto Blue Jays
- League: American League
- Division: East
- Ballpark: Rogers Centre
- City: Toronto, Ontario
- Record: 67–95 (.414)
- Divisional place: 4th
- Owners: Rogers, CEO Mark Shapiro
- General managers: Ross Atkins
- Managers: Charlie Montoyo
- Television: Sportsnet; Sportsnet One (Buck Martinez, Pat Tabler, Dan Shulman)
- Radio: Blue Jays Radio Network; Sportsnet 590 the FAN (Ben Wagner, Mike Wilner, Kevin Barker)

The 2019 Toronto Blue Jays season was the franchise's 43rd season in Major League Baseball, and 29th full season (30th overall) at Rogers Centre. The Blue Jays were managed by Charlie Montoyo in his first year as the Blue Jays manager. The Blue Jays began their season at home against the Detroit Tigers on March 28 and ended their season at home against the Tampa Bay Rays on Sunday, September 29. They finished with a record of 67–95, a worse record than the previous season, and failed to qualify for the postseason for the third consecutive year.

== Offseason ==
On September 26, 2018, it was announced that John Gibbons would not return to manage the Blue Jays for the 2019 season.

=== October 2018 ===
- On October 25, the Blue Jays hired Charlie Montoyo as their new manager.
- On October 29, RHP Marco Estrada and RHP Tyler Clippard elected free agency.
- On October 31, the Blue Jays exercised their $8 million club option on Justin Smoak, and declined their $5.5 million club option on Yangervis Solarte.

=== November 2018 ===
- On November 2, the Blue Jays outrighted Justin Shafer to Triple-A. Rhiner Cruz, Taylor Guerrieri, and Jake Petricka cleared waivers and became free agents. José Fernández was claimed off waivers by the Detroit Tigers.
- On November 3, the Blue Jays fired hitting coach Brook Jacoby and first base coach Tim Leiper.
- On November 7, the Blue Jays hired Dave Hudgens as their bench coach, replacing DeMarlo Hale.
- On November 15, the Blue Jays hired Guillermo Martinez as their new hitting coach.
- On November 17, the Blue Jays traded INF Aledmys Díaz to the Houston Astros for P Trent Thornton.
- On November 20, the Blue Jays selected the contracts of Héctor Pérez, Trent Thornton, Patrick Murphy, Yennsy Díaz, and Jacob Waguespack.
- On November 26, the Blue Jays claimed Oliver Drake off waivers from the Tampa Bay Rays, and designated Mark Leiter Jr. for assignment.
- On November 26, the Blue Jays hired Matt Buschmann as their new bullpen coach, Mark Budzinski as their new first base coach, and Shelley Duncan as their major league field co-ordinator.
- On November 27, the Blue Jays named John Schneider their Major League coach, and announced that Mike Mordecai would not be returning as the team's quality control coach.
- On November 30, the Blue Jays non-tendered Yangervis Solarte, who became a free agent.

=== December 2018 ===
- On December 11, the Blue Jays released Troy Tulowitzki.
- On December 13, the Blue Jays selected Elvis Luciano in the Rule 5 draft, but lost Jordan Romano and Travis Bergen in the same draft to the Chicago White Sox and the San Francisco Giants, respectively.
- On December 28, the Blue Jays signed Matt Shoemaker to a 1-year, $3.5 million contract.
- On December 30, the Blue Jays acquired Clayton Richard from the San Diego Padres in exchange for minor leaguer Connor Panas. Oliver Drake was designated for assignment.

=== January 2019 ===
- On January 4, the Blue Jays traded Oliver Drake to the Tampa Bay Rays for cash considerations.
- On January 11, the Blue Jays sent Russell Martin along with $16.4 million to the Los Angeles Dodgers for minor leaguers Ronny Brito and Andrew Sopko.
- On January 11, the Blue Jays avoided arbitration and agreed to one-year contracts with Marcus Stroman ($7.4 million), Aaron Sanchez ($3.9 million), Kevin Pillar ($5.8 million), Randal Grichuk ($5 million), Joe Biagini ($900,000), Ken Giles ($6.3 million), Devon Travis ($1.925 million), and Brandon Drury ($1.3 million).
- On January 12, the Blue Jays signed David Phelps to a 1-year, $2.5 million contract.
- On January 29, the Blue Jays signed Freddy Galvis to a 1-year, $4 million contract with a club option for 2020. Danny Barnes was designated for assignment.

== Spring training ==
On March 25 and 26, the Blue Jays returned to Montreal's Olympic Stadium for two games against the Milwaukee Brewers.

== Standings ==
=== American League East ===
AL East
Team	W	L	Pct.	GB	Home	Road
New York Yankees	103	59	.636	—	57‍–‍24	46‍–‍35
Tampa Bay Rays	96	66	.593	7	48‍–‍33	48‍–‍33
Boston Red Sox	84	78	.519	19	38‍–‍43	46‍–‍35
Toronto Blue Jays	67	95	.414	36	35‍–‍46	32‍–‍49
Baltimore Orioles	54	108	.333	49	25‍–‍56	29‍–‍52

=== American League Wild Card ===
Division leaders
Team	W	L	Pct.
Houston Astros	107	55	.660
New York Yankees	103	59	.636
Minnesota Twins	101	61	.623

Wild Card teams (Top 2 teams qualify for postseason)
Team	W	L	Pct.	GB
Oakland Athletics	97	65	.599	+1
Tampa Bay Rays	96	66	.593	—
Cleveland Indians	93	69	.574	3
Boston Red Sox	84	78	.519	12
Texas Rangers	78	84	.481	18
Chicago White Sox	72	89	.447	23½
Los Angeles Angels	72	90	.444	24
Seattle Mariners	68	94	.420	28
Toronto Blue Jays	67	95	.414	29
Kansas City Royals	59	103	.364	37
Baltimore Orioles	54	108	.333	42
Detroit Tigers	47	114	.292	48½

== Records vs opponents ==
	Record			Games Left		
Opponent	Home	Road	Total	Home	Road	Total
AL East
Baltimore Orioles	4–5	7–3	11–8	–	–	–
Boston Red Sox	4–6	4–5	8–11	–	–	–
New York Yankees	6–4	2–7	8–11	–	–	–
Tampa Bay Rays	4–5	2–8	6–13	–	–	–
Totals	18–20	15–23	33–43	–	–	–
AL Central
Chicago White Sox	1–2	2–2	3–4	–	–	–
Cleveland Indians	1–2	0–4	1–6	–	–	–
Detroit Tigers	2–2	2–1	4–3	–	–	–
Kansas City Royals	3–1	3–0	6–1	–	–	–
Minnesota Twins	0–3	3–1	3–4	–	–	–
Totals	7–10	10–8	17–18	–	–	–
AL West
Houston Astros	1–2	1–2	2–4	–	–	–
Los Angeles Angels	1–3	0–3	1–6	–	–	–
Oakland Athletics	3–0	3–0	6–0	–	–	–
Seattle Mariners	1–2	1–2	2–4	–	–	–
Texas Rangers	2–1	1–2	3–3	–	–	–
Totals	8–8	6–9	14–17	–	–	–
National League
Arizona Diamondbacks	0–3	–	0–3	–	–	–
Atlanta Braves	1–1	0–2	1–3	–	–	–
Colorado Rockies	–	0–3	0–3	–	–	–
Los Angeles Dodgers	–	0–3	0–3	–	–	–
San Diego Padres	1–2	–	1–2	–	–	–
San Francisco Giants	0–2	1–1	1–3	–	–	–
Totals	2–8	1–9	3–17	–	–	–
Grand Totals	35–46	32–49	67–95	–	–	–

Month	Games	Won	Lost	Pct.
March	4	2	2	.500
April	25	12	13	.480
May	28	7	21	.250
June	27	10	17	.370
July	26	12	14	.462
August	27	12	15	.444
September	25	12	13	.480
Totals	162	67	95	.414

== 2019 draft ==
Round	Pick	Player	Position	College/School	Nationality	Signed
1	11	Alek Manoah	RHP	West Virginia	(United States)	June 13
2	52	Kendall Williams	RHP	IMG Academy (FL)	(United States)	June 9
3	88	Dasan Brown	OF	Abbey Park High School (ON)	(Canada)	June 29
4	117	Will Robertson	OF	Creighton	(United States)	June 11
5	147	Tanner Morris	SS	Virginia	(United States)	June 11
6	177	Cameron Eden	SS	California	(United States)	June 11
7	207	L. J. Talley	2B	Georgia	(United States)	June 14
8	237	Angel Camacho	3B	Jacksonville	(United States)	June 16
9	267	Philip Clarke	C	Vanderbilt	(United States)	July 2
10	297	Glenn Santiago	SS	International Baseball Academy (PR)	(Puerto Rico)	June 13

== Regular season ==
=== Opening Day ===
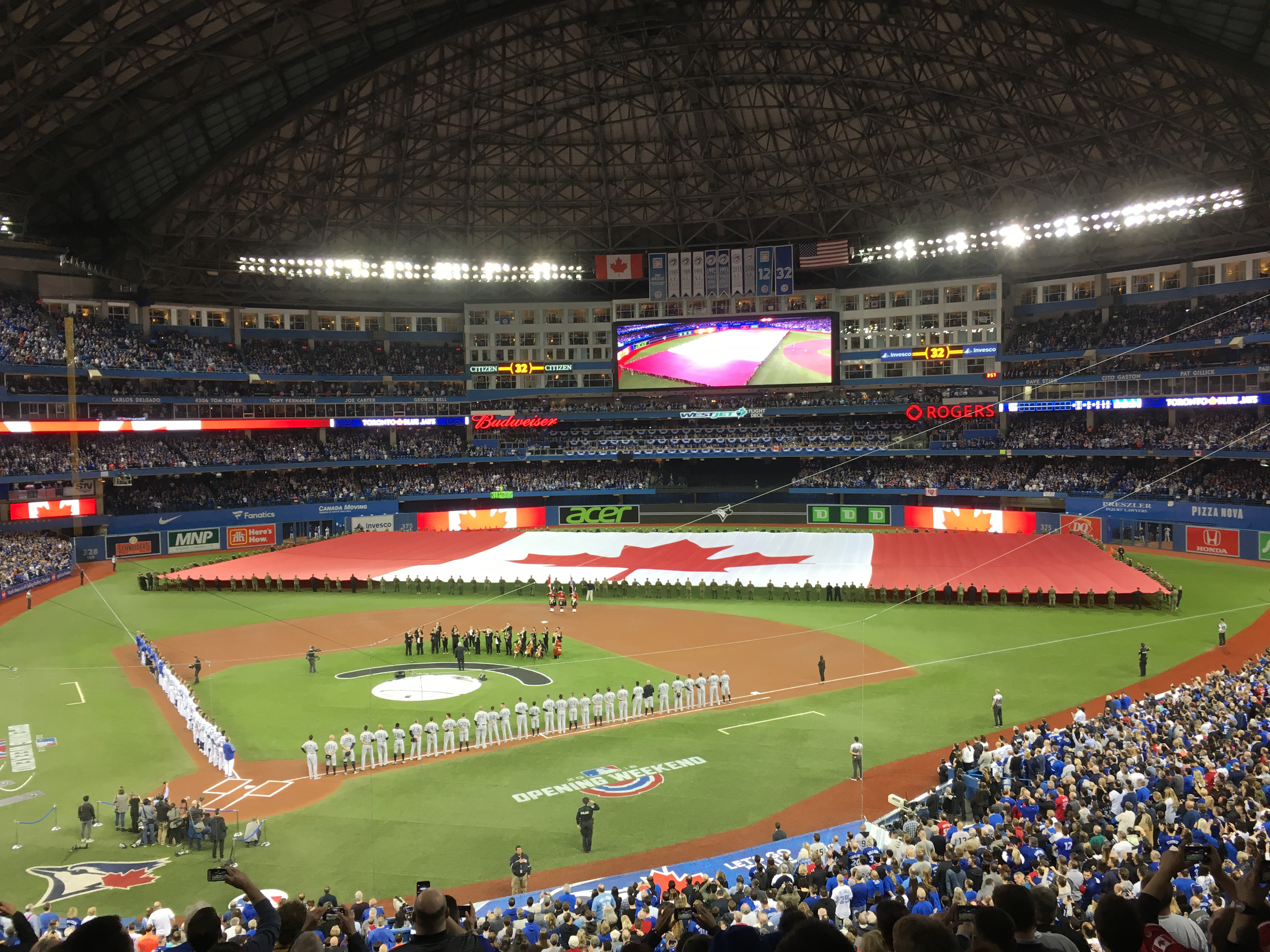
The Rogers Centre on Opening Day

Opening Day starters
Position	Name
Catcher	Danny Jansen
First baseman	Justin Smoak
Second baseman	Lourdes Gurriel Jr.
Shortstop	Freddy Galvis
Third baseman	Brandon Drury
Left fielder	Teoscar Hernández
Center fielder	Kevin Pillar
Right fielder	Randal Grichuk
Designated hitter	Rowdy Tellez
Pitcher	Marcus Stroman

=== March and April ===
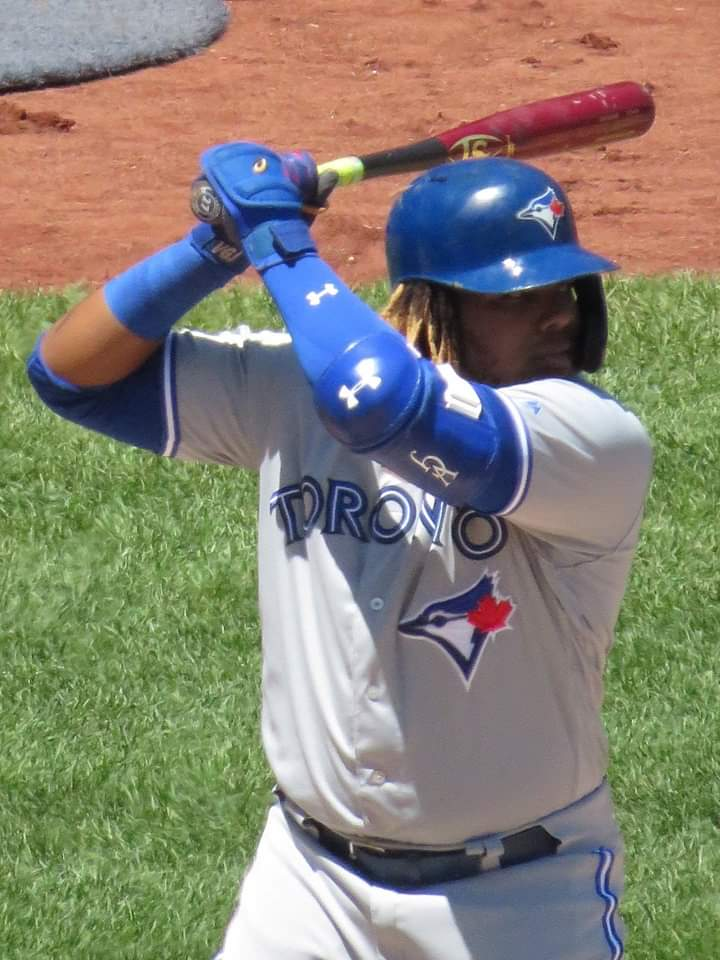
Vladimir Guerrero Jr.

On opening day, Detroit Tigers starting pitcher Jordan Zimmermann pitched a perfect game through 6 2/3 innings against the Blue Jays before giving up a hit to Teoscar Hernández. Marcus Stroman also pitched seven scoreless innings for the Blue Jays. Toronto lost the contest 2–0 in 11 innings, after Christin Stewart hit a two-run homer in the 10th inning. On April 1, Baltimore Orioles starting pitcher David Hess pitched a no-hitter through 6 1/3 innings before manager Brandon Hyde took him out of the game, in a game the Blue Jays wound up losing 6–5. On April 4, in the first game of a four-game set against the Cleveland Indians at Progressive Field, starter Trevor Bauer pitched seven innings of no-hit ball against the Blue Jays before being removed from the game after throwing 117 pitches, as the Blue Jays lost 4–1. In the final game of the series, Indians pitcher Mike Clevinger pitched five innings, while giving up one hit and striking out 10 Blue Jays batters in a 3–1 Cleveland win. The Blue Jays managed only 19 hits while tallying 57 strikeouts in the series, the second most in franchise history, while striking out at least 13 times in four consecutive games for the first time in franchise history and only fourth time in MLB history.

=== May ===
The Blue Jays were swept by the Minnesota Twins in a series at home from May 6 to May 8 as they were shutout in back-to-back games, before Billy McKinney's solo home run in the final game of the series ended a 25-inning scoreless skid for the team. The team had their worst month of the year in May, finishing with a 7–21 record while losing four straight games or more on three separate occasions.

=== June ===
On June 2, the Colorado Rockies finished off a three-game sweep of the Blue Jays at Coors Field. From June 7 to June 9, another national league team, the Arizona Diamondbacks, swept the Blue Jays at the Rogers Centre in a series where Toronto only managed to score four runs. In a game at Yankee Stadium against the Blue Jays on June 25, the New York Yankees set a new MLB team record by hitting a home run for the 28th consecutive game, with DJ LeMahieu hitting the record-setting home run in the first inning in a 4–3 win.

=== July ===
On July 24, Shane Bieber of the Cleveland Indians tossed a complete game one hitter against the Blue Jays, striking out ten batters and walking one as the Indians won 4–0, taking two of three games from the Jays.

=== August ===
On August 8, rookie Bo Bichette set a new MLB record for most consecutive games with an extra-base hit to start a career with nine when he doubled in the bottom of the sixth inning against the New York Yankees. On August 11, Masahiro Tanaka of the New York Yankees pitched eight innings against the Blue Jays while giving up only three hits in a 1–0 win that split a four-game set between the two teams. Aroldis Chapman came in the 9th inning to close the game for the Yankees, inducing a double play from the bat of Vladimir Guerrero Jr. following a 13-pitch at-bat, for which the rookie received a standing ovation from the crowd at Rogers Centre. In their game against the Texas Rangers on August 12, the Blue Jays set a franchise record with 13 extra-base hits. On August 18, Yusei Kikuchi of the Seattle Mariners pitched a complete game two-hit shutout against the Blue Jays in a 7–0 win as the Mariners took two of three games from the Blue Jays.

=== September ===
On September 1, Justin Verlander of the Houston Astros pitched a no-hitter against the Blue Jays, the third of his career (and second against Toronto) in a 2–0 win.

=== Game log ===
Legend
Blue Jays win	Blue Jays loss	Game postponed

2019 Game Log: 67–95 (Home: 35–46; Away: 32–49)
March: 2–2 (Home: 2–2; Road: 0–0)

#	Date	Opponent	Score	Win	Loss	Save	Attendance	Record	GB
1	March 28	Tigers	0–2 (10)	Alcántara (1–0)	Hudson (0–1)	Greene (1)	45,048	0–1	1
2	March 29	Tigers	6–0	Shoemaker (1–0)	Boyd (0–1)	—	18,054	1–1	½
3	March 30	Tigers	3–0	Sanchez (1–0)	Turnbull (0–1)	Giles (1)	25,429	2–1	–
4	March 31	Tigers	3–4 (11)	Stumpf (1–0)	Pannone (0–1)	Greene (2)	16,098	2–2	1

April: 12–13 (Home: 5–6; Road: 7–7)

#	Date	Opponent	Score	Win	Loss	Save	Attendance	Record	GB
5	April 1	Orioles	5–6	Hess (1–0)	Reid-Foley (0–1)	Bleier (1)	10,460	2–3	2
6	April 2	Orioles	1–2	Cashner (1–1)	Stroman (0–1)	Castro (1)	12,110	2–4	3
7	April 3	Orioles	5–3	Shoemaker (2–0)	Karns (0–1)	Giles (2)	11,436	3–4	2
8	April 4	@ Indians	1–4	Bauer (1–0)	Sanchez (0–1)	Hand (3)	10,375	3–5	2½
9	April 5	@ Indians	2–3	Cimber (1–0)	Biagini (0–1)	—	12,881	3–6	3½
10	April 6	@ Indians	2–7	Carrasco (1–1)	Pannone (0–2)	—	18,429	3–7	3½
11	April 7	@ Indians	1–3	Clevinger (1–0)	Stroman (0–2)	Hand (4)	17,264	3–8	4½
12	April 9	@ Red Sox	7–5	Shoemaker (3–0)	Sale (0–3)	Giles (3)	36,179	4–8	5
13	April 11	@ Red Sox	6–7	Walden (2–0)	Giles (0–1)	—	36,510	4–9	6
14	April 12	Rays	7–11	Yarbrough (2–1)	Thornton (0–1)	—	17,326	4–10	7
15	April 13	Rays	3–1	Pannone (1–2)	Roe (0–2)	Giles (4)	20,771	5–10	6
16	April 14	Rays	4–8	Kolarek (1–0)	Stroman (0–3)	—	20,512	5–11	7
17	April 15	@ Twins	5–3	Gaviglio (1–0)	Mejía (0–1)	Biagini (1)	11,727	6–11	6½
18	April 16	@ Twins	6–5	Sanchez (2–1)	May (1–1)	Giles (5)	13,365	7–11	6½
19	April 17	@ Twins	1–4	Odorizzi (1–2)	Thornton (0–2)	Parker (4)	11,465	7–12	7½
20	April 18	@ Twins	7–4	Biagini (1–1)	Pineda (2–1)	Giles (6)	12,523	8–12	6½
21	April 19	@ Athletics	5–1	Stroman (1–3)	Brooks (2–2)	—	15,128	9–12	5½
22	April 20	@ Athletics	10–1	Gaviglio (2–0)	Fiers (2–2)	—	31,140	10–12	4½
23	April 21	@ Athletics	5–4	Hudson (1–1)	Anderson (3–1)	Giles (7)	16,015	11–12	3½
24	April 23	Giants	6–7	Samardzija (2–1)	Thornton (0–3)	Smith (6)	20,384	11–13	5
25	April 24	Giants	0–4	Pomeranz (1–2)	Buchholz (0–1)	—	19,652	11–14	5
26	April 26	Athletics	4–2	Giles (1–1)	Petit (0–1)	—	28,688	12–14	4½
27	April 27	Athletics	7–1	Sanchez (3–1)	Anderson (3–2)	—	22,254	13–14	4½
28	April 28	Athletics	5–4 (11)	Luciano (1–0)	Treinen (1–2)	—	18,557	14–14	4½
29	April 30	@ Angels	3–4	Buttrey (2–1)	Tepera (0–1)	Robles (2)	38,797	14–15	5½

May: 7–21 (Home: 3–10; Road: 4–11)

#	Date	Opponent	Score	Win	Loss	Save	Attendance	Record	GB
30	May 1	@ Angels	3–6	Peña (1–1)	Stroman (1–4)	Buttrey (1)	33,082	14–16	5
31	May 2	@ Angels	2–6	Skaggs (3–2)	Sanchez (3–2)	—	40,064	14–17	6
32	May 3	@ Rangers	1–0 (12)	Hudson (2–1)	Jurado (0–1)	Giles (8)	26,179	15–17	6
33	May 4	@ Rangers	5–8	Lynn (4–2)	Pannone (1–3)	Kelley (2)	31,787	15–18	6
34	May 5	@ Rangers	2–10	Dowdy (2–1)	Buchholz (0–2)	—	30,934	15–19	6½
35	May 6	Twins	0–8	Pérez (5–0)	Stroman (1–5)	—	12,292	15–20	7½
36	May 7	Twins	0–3	Berríos (6–1)	Sanchez (3–3)	Rogers (4)	14,039	15–21	8½
37	May 8	Twins	1–9	Gibson (3–1)	Thornton (0–4)	—	14,372	15–22	8½
38	May 10	White Sox	4–3	Biagini (2–1)	Covey (0–2)	Giles (9)	20,402	16–22	7½
39	May 11	White Sox	2–7	Nova (2–3)	Stroman (1–6)	—	24,563	16–23	8½
40	May 12	White Sox	1–5	Giolito (4–1)	Sanchez (3–4)	—	24,222	16–24	8½
41	May 14	@ Giants	7–3	Thornton (1–4)	Vincent (0–2)	—	31,230	17–24	8½
42	May 15	@ Giants	3–4	Melancon (1–0)	Tepera (0–2)	Smith (11)	31,028	17–25	9½
43	May 16	@ White Sox	2–4	Herrera (1–2)	Law (0–1)	Colomé (9)	20,119	17–26	10
44	May 17	@ White Sox	10–2	Gaviglio (3–0)	Nova (2–4)	Guerra (1)	17,078	18–26	9½
45	May 18	@ White Sox	1–4 (5)	Giolito (5–1)	Feierabend (0–1)	—	22,908	18–27	10
46	May 19	@ White Sox	5–2	Hudson (3–1)	Herrera (1–3)	Giles (10)	18,605	19–27	9½
47	May 20	Red Sox	2–12	Price (2–2)	Jackson (0–1)	—	26,794	19–28	10½
48	May 21	Red Sox	10–3	Stroman (2–6)	Rodríguez (4–3)	—	14,407	20–28	10½
49	May 22	Red Sox	5–6 (13)	Hembree (1–0)	Cordero (0–1)	—	18,285	20–29	11½
50	May 23	Red Sox	2–8	Weber (1–0)	Gaviglio (3–1)	—	36,526	20–30	12½
51	May 24	Padres	3–6	Wisler (2–1)	Hudson (3–2)	Stammen (2)	19,480	20–31	13
52	May 25	Padres	4–19	Quantrill (1–2)	Jackson (0–2)	—	24,212	20–32	14½
53	May 26	Padres	10–1	Stroman (3–6)	Erlin (0–1)	—	24,462	21–32	13½
54	May 27	@ Rays	3–8	Chirinos (6–1)	Sanchez (3–5)		15,883	21–33	14½
55	May 28	@ Rays	1–3	Yarbrough (4–1)	Richard (0–1)	Castillo (6)	5,786	21–34	14½
56	May 29	@ Rays	3–4 (11)	Castillo (1–3)	Shafer (0–1)		6,166	21–35	15½
57	May 31	@ Rockies	6–13	Márquez (6–2)	Jackson (0–3)		32,990	21–36	16½

June: 10–17 (Home: 5–8; Road: 5–9)

#	Date	Opponent	Score	Win	Loss.	Save	Attendance	Record	GB
58	June 1	@ Rockies	2–4	Gray (5–4)	Stroman (3–7)	Oberg (2)	34,205	21–37	17½
59	June 2	@ Rockies	1–5	Senzatela (4–4)	Sanchez (3–6)	—	37,861	21–38	17½
60	June 4	Yankees	4–3	Pannone (2–3)	Tanaka (3–5)	Giles (11)	20,671	22–38	16½
61	June 5	Yankees	11–7	Gaviglio (4–1)	Britton (2–1)	—	16,609	23–38	15½
62	June 6	Yankees	2–6	Happ (6–3)	Jackson (0–4)	Chapman (18)	25,657	23–39	16½
63	June 7	Diamondbacks	2–8	Kelly (6–6)	Stroman (3–8)	—	16,555	23–40	16½
64	June 8	Diamondbacks	0–6	Greinke (7–2)	Sanchez (3–7)	—	22,954	23–41	16½
65	June 9	Diamondbacks	2–8	Ray (5–3)	Richard (0–2)	—	19,661	23–42	17½
66	June 11	@ Orioles	2–4	Means (6–4)	Thornton (1–5)	Givens (6)	12,524	23–43	18
67	June 12	@ Orioles	8–6	Jackson (1–4)	Hess (1–9)	Hudson (1)	11,153	24–43	17½
68	June 13	@ Orioles	12–3	Stroman (4–8)	Ynoa (0–3)	—	14,910	25–43	16½
69	June 14	@ Astros	2–15	Cole (6–5)	Sanchez (3–8)	Armenteros (1)	34,719	25–44	17
70	June 15	@ Astros	2–7	Valdez (3–2)	Richard (0–3)	—	38,012	25–45	17½
71	June 16	@ Astros	12–0	Thornton (2–5)	Peacock (6–4)	—	42,174	26–45	17½
72	June 17	Angels	5–10	Peña (5–1)	Jackson (1–5)	—	15,227	26–46	18½
73	June 18	Angels	1–3	Skaggs (6–6)	Stroman (4–9)	Robles (11)	17,259	26–47	19½
74	June 19	Angels	6–11	Ramirez (3–0)	Sanchez (3–9)	—	16,225	26–48	20½
75	June 20	Angels	7–5 (10)	Kingham (2–1) (Note: 1–0 with Toronto)	Buttrey (4–4)	—	24,291	27–48	20½
76	June 21	@ Red Sox	5–7 (10)	Workman (6–1)	Romano (0–1)	—	36,711	27–49	21½
77	June 22	@ Red Sox	8–7	Kingham (3–1) (Note: 2–0 with Toronto)	Barnes (3–2)	Giles (12)	36,712	28–49	21½
78	June 23	@ Red Sox	6–1	Stroman (5–9)	Porcello (5–7)	—	36,495	29–49	20½
79	June 24	@ Yankees	8–10	Sabathia (5–4)	Sanchez (3–10)	Chapman (22)	37,204	29–50	21½
80	June 25	@ Yankees	3–4	Green (2–2)	Richard (0–4)	Chapman (23)	40,119	29–51	22½
81	June 26	@ Yankees	7–8	Britton (3–1)	Kingham (3–2) (Note: 2–1 with Toronto)	—	40,578	29–52	23½
82	June 28	Royals	6–2	Hudson (4–2)	Duffy (3–4)	—	18,399	30–52	23
83	June 29	Royals	7–5	Hudson (5–2)	Barlow (2–3)	—	24,906	31–52	23
84	June 30	Royals	6–7	Keller (4–9)	Sanchez (3–11)	Kennedy (11)	21,727	31–53	24

July: 12–14 (Home: 5–8; Road: 7–6)

#	Date	Opponent	Score	Win	Loss	Save	Attendance	Record	GB
85	July 1	Royals	11–4	Richard (1–4)	Sparkman (2–4)	—	29,339	32–53	23½
86	July 2	Red Sox	6–10	Price (6–2)	Thornton (2–6)	—	18,415	32–54	23½
87	July 3	Red Sox	6–3	Waguespack (1–0)	Sale (3–8)	Giles (13)	16,883	33–54	23½
88	July 4	Red Sox	7–8	Workman (8–1)	Giles (1–2)	—	22,217	33–55	24½
89	July 5	Orioles	1–4	Bundy (4–10)	Sanchez (3–12)	Fry (3)	20,530	33–56	25½
90	July 6	Orioles	1–8	Cashner (9–3)	Richard (1–5)	—	22,405	33–57	25½
91	July 7	Orioles	6–1	Thornton (3–6)	Wojciechowski (0–2)	—	22,487	34–57	24½
92	July 12	@ Yankees	0–4	Germán (11–2)	Sanchez (3–13)	—	47,162	34–58	25½
93	July 13	@ Yankees	2–1	Biagini (3–1)	Happ (7–5)	Hudson (2)	43,472	35–58	24½
94	July 14	@ Yankees	2–4	Tanaka (6–5)	Stroman (5–10)	Chapman (25)	42,303	35–59	25½
95	July 15	@ Red Sox	8–10	Porcello (7–7)	Thornton (3–7)	Workman (4)	35,616	35–60	25½
96	July 16	@ Red Sox	10–4	Shafer (1–1)	Cashner (9–4)	—	36,341	36–60	25½
97	July 17	@ Red Sox	4–5	Rodríguez (11–4)	Sanchez (3–14)	Workman (5)	34,853	36–61	26
98	July 18	@ Red Sox	0–5	Sale (4–9)	Pannone (2–4)	—	35,357	36–62	27½
99	July 19	@ Tigers	12–1	Stroman (6–10)	Zimmermann (0–7)	—	26,498	37–62	27½
100	July 20	@ Tigers	7–5	Font (3–2) (Note: 1–0 with Toronto)	Soto (0–4)	Giles (14)	28,784	38–62	27½
101	July 21	@ Tigers	3–4 (10)	Ramirez (5–3)	Mayza (0–1)		22,562	38–63	27½
102	July 22	Indians	3–7	Clevinger (4–2)	Borucki (0–1)	—	22,295	38–64	27½
103	July 23	Indians	2–1 (10)	Giles (2–2)	Olson (1–1)	—	22,186	39–64	27½
104	July 24	Indians	0–4	Bieber (10–3)	Stroman (6–11)	—	25,385	39–65	28½
105	July 26	Rays	1–3	Yarbrough (9–3)	Waguespack (1–1)	Poche (1)	22,767	39–66	28
106	July 27	Rays	10–9 (12)	Hudson (6–2)	Pagán (2–2)	—	28,204	40–66	27
107	July 28	Rays	9–10	Roe (1–3)	Hudson (6–3)	Castillo (8)	24,542	40–67	28
108	July 29	@ Royals	7–3	Mayza (1–1)	Keller (7–10)	—	18,306	41–67	27½
109	July 30	@ Royals	9–2	Reid-Foley (1–1)	Montgomery (1–4)	—	18,379	42–67	26½
110	July 31	@ Royals	4–1	Waguespack (2–1)	Junis (6–10)	Shafer (1)	14,480	43–67	26½

August: 12–15 (Home: 7–7; Road: 5–8)

#	Date	Opponent	Score	Win	Loss	Save	Attendance	Record	GB
111	August 1	@ Orioles	11–2	Thornton (4–7)	Wojciechowski (2–4)	—	9,716	44–67	26
112	August 2	@ Orioles	5–2	Kingham (4–2) (Note: 3–1 with Toronto)	Brooks (2–5)	Law (1)	16,331	45–67	26
113	August 3	@ Orioles	4–6	Givens (2–5)	Boshers (0–1)	Fry (3)	12,951	45–68	27½
114	August 4	@ Orioles	5–6	Eshelman (1–2)	Reid-Foley (1–2)	Armstrong (4)	18,837	45–69	28½
115	August 5	@ Rays	2–0	Waguespack (3–1)	Morton (12–4)	Law (2)	11,948	46–69	28½
116	August 6	@ Rays	6–7 (10)	Castillo (2–6)	Boshers (0–2)	—	9,434	46–70	29½
117	August 7	@ Rays	4–3	Stewart (1–0)	McKay (2–2)	Giles (15)	10,299	47–70	29½
118	August 8	Yankees	6–12	Germán (15–2)	Pannone (2–5)	Cessa (1)	34,108	47–71	30½
119	August 9	Yankees	8–2	Reid-Foley (2–2)	Happ (9–7)	—	25,782	48–71	29½
120	August 10	Yankees	5–4	Adam (1–0)	Ottavino (5–4)	Law (3)	33,903	49–71	28½
121	August 11	Yankees	0–1	Tanaka (8–6)	Thornton (4–8)	Chapman (31)	27,790	49–72	29½
122	August 12	Rangers	19–4	Stewart (2–0)	Jurado (6–8)	—	16,492	50–72	30
123	August 13	Rangers	3–0	Pannone (3–5)	Lynn (14–8)	Giles (16)	22,958	51–72	30
124	August 14	Rangers	3–7	Allard (1–0)	Reid-Foley (2–3)	—	34,666	51–73	31
125	August 16	Mariners	7–3	Waguespack (4–1)	LeBlanc (6–7)	—	20,844	52–73	30½
126	August 17	Mariners	3–4	Bass (2–4)	Mayza (1–2)	Magill (1)	22,073	52–74	31½
127	August 18	Mariners	0–7	Kikuchi (5–8)	Font (3–3) (Note: 1–1 with Toronto)	—	23,604	52–75	31½
128	August 20	@ Dodgers	3–16	Kershaw (13–2)	Reid-Foley (2–4)	—	52,030	52–76	31½
129	August 21	@ Dodgers	1–2 (10)	Báez (7–2)	Mayza (1–3)	—	44,106	52–77	31½
130	August 22	@ Dodgers	2–3	Sadler (3–0)	Law (0–2)	—	49,796	52–78	31½
131	August 23	@ Mariners	4–7	Wisler (3–2)	Gaviglio (4–2)	Magill (3)	34,706	52–79	32½
132	August 24	@ Mariners	7–5	Stewart (3–0)	McClain (0–1)	Law (4)	34,590	53–79	31½
133	August 25	@ Mariners	1–3	Gonzales (14–10)	Buchholz (0–3)	Magill (4)	29,698	53–80	32½
134	August 27	Braves	3–1	Godley (4–5) (Note: 1–0 with Toronto)	Soroka (10–3)	Giles (17)	24,578	54–80	33
135	August 28	Braves	4–9	Jackson (8–2)	Waguespack (4–2)	—	23,112	54–81	34
136	August 30	Astros	4–7	McHugh (4–5)	Thornton (4–9)	—	25,289	54–82	34
137	August 31	Astros	6–4	Buchholz (1–3)	Valdez (4–7)	Giles (18)	26,414	55–82	34

September: 12–13 (Home: 8–5; Road: 4–8)

#	Date	Opponent	Score	Win	Loss	Save	Attendance	Record	GB
138	September 1	Astros	0–2	Verlander (17–5)	Giles (2–3)	—	24,104	55–83	35
139	September 2	@ Braves	3–6	Soroka (11–3)	Waguespack (4–3)	Melancon (9)	28,987	55–84	35
140	September 3	@ Braves	2–7	Foltynewicz (5-5)	Font (3–4) (Note: 1–2 with Toronto)	—	25,427	55–85	36
141	September 5	@ Rays	4–6	Drake (4–2)	Boshers (0–3)	Pagán (18)	5,962	55–86	37
142	September 6	@ Rays	0–5	Fairbanks (1–2)	Buchholz (1–4)	Pagán (19)	10,853	55–87	37
143	September 7	@ Rays	3–5	Anderson (5–4)	Romano (0–2)	Drake (2)	12,663	55–88	38
144	September 8	@ Rays	3–8	Richards (5–12)	Waguespack (4–4)	—	14,071	55–89	39
145	September 10	Red Sox	4–3	Shafer (2–1)	Taylor (1–2)	Giles (19)	17,819	56–89	38½
146	September 11	Red Sox	8–0	Thornton (5–9)	Kelley (0–1)	—	14,463	57–89	38
147	September 12	Red Sox	4–7	Taylor (2–2)	Buchholz (1–5)	Workman (12)	17,420	57–90	39½
148	September 13	Yankees	6–5 (12)	Font (4–4) (Note: 2–2 with Toronto)	Lyons (1–2)	—	23,915	58–90	38½
149	September 14	Yankees	3–13	Paxton (14–6)	Waguespack (4–5)	—	26,308	58–91	39½
150	September 15	Yankees	6–4	Zeuch (1–0)	Cortés Jr. (5–1)	Giles (20)	22,562	59–91	38½
151	September 17	@ Orioles	8–5	Law (1–2)	Givens (2–6)	—	9,280	60–91	38½
152	September 18	@ Orioles	11–10	Stewart (4–0)	Castro (1–3)	Law (5)	9,066	61–91	37½
153	September 19	@ Orioles	8–4	Kay (1–0)	Ynoa (1–9)	—	10,148	62–91	37½
154	September 20	@ Yankees	4–3	Adam (2–0)	Kahnle (3–2)	Giles (21)	45,270	63–91	36½
155	September 21	@ Yankees	2–7	Paxton (15–6)	Zeuch (1–1)	—	43,602	63–92	37½
156	September 22	@ Yankees	3–8	Severino (1–0)	Font (4–5) (Note: 2–3 with Toronto)	—	44,583	63–93	38½
157	September 23	Orioles	11–10 (15)	Adam (3–0)	Eades (0–1)	—	13,193	64–93	38
158	September 24	Orioles	4–11	Bundy (7–14)	Pannone (3–6)	—	12,625	64–94	38
159	September 25	Orioles	3–2	Waguespack (5–5)	Ynoa (1–10)	Giles (22)	13,853	65–94	37
160	September 27	Rays	2–6	Drake (5–2)	Zeuch (1–2)	—	16,348	65–95	38
161	September 28	Rays	4–1	Thornton (6–9)	Yarbrough (11–6)	Giles (23)	20,293	66–95	37
162	September 29	Rays	8–3	Buchholz (2–5)	Snell (6–8)	—	25,738	67–95	36

== Roster ==
2019 Toronto Blue Jays
Roster
Pitchers: 48 Jason Adam; 31 Joe Biagini; 56 Ryan Borucki; 67 Buddy Boshers; 36 Clay Buchholz; 66 Jimmy Cordero; 59 Yennsy Díaz; 73 Ryan Dull; 60 Ryan Feierabend; 63 Wilmer Font; 43 Sam Gaviglio; 51 Ken Giles; 46 Zack Godley; 48 Javy Guerra; 46 Daniel Hudson; 33 Edwin Jackson; 70 Anthony Kay; 66 Nick Kingham; 64 Derek Law; 65 Elvis Luciano; 58 Tim Mayza; 45 Thomas Pannone; 35 David Phelps; 33 Neil Ramírez; 54 Sean Reid-Foley; 2 Clayton Richard; 68 Jordan Romano; 59 Zac Rosscup; 41 Aaron Sanchez; 50 Justin Shafer; 34 Matt Shoemaker; 35 Brock Stewart; 6 Marcus Stroman; 52 Ryan Tepera; 57 Trent Thornton; 62 Jacob Waguespack; 71 T. J. Zeuch	Catchers: 9 Danny Jansen; 21 Luke Maile; 10 Reese McGuire; 72 Beau Taylor; Infielders: 11 Bo Bichette; 8 Cavan Biggio; 3 Brandon Drury; 16 Freddy Galvis; 27 Vladimir Guerrero Jr.; 1,19 Alen Hanson; 14 Justin Smoak; 5 Eric Sogard; 44 Rowdy Tellez; 7 Richard Ureña; 74 Breyvic Valera	Outfielders: 30 Anthony Alford; 38 Socrates Brito; 49 Jonathan Davis; 20 Derek Fisher; 15 Randal Grichuk; 13 Lourdes Gurriel Jr.; 37 Teoscar Hernández; 28 Billy McKinney; 11 Kevin Pillar	Manager: 25 Charlie Montoyo; Coaches: 61 Alex Andreopoulos (bullpen catcher); 55 Nevin Ashley (bullpen catcher); 53 Mark Budzinski (first base); 26 Matt Buschmann (bullpen); 47 Shelley Duncan (field coordinator); 39 Dave Hudgens (bench); 18 Guillermo Martínez (hitting); 4 Luis Rivera (third base); 17 John Schneider (coach); 40 Pete Walker (pitching)

== Statistics ==
=== Batting ===
Note: G = Games played; AB = At bats; R = Runs scored; H = Hits; 2B = Doubles; 3B = Triples; HR = Home runs; RBI = Runs batted in; SB = Stolen bases; BB = Walks; AVG = Batting average; Ref. = Reference

Player	G	AB	R	H	2B	3B	HR	RBI	SB	BB	AVG	Ref.
Anthony Alford	16	28	3	5	0	0	1	1	2	1	.179	
Bo Bichette	46	196	32	61	18	0	11	21	4	14	.311	
Cavan Biggio	100	354	66	83	17	2	16	48	14	71	.234	
Socrates Brito	17	39	5	3	0	1	0	2	0	4	.077	
Jonathan Davis	37	83	8	15	1	0	2	6	3	5	.181	
Brandon Drury	120	418	43	91	21	1	15	41	0	25	.218	
Derek Fisher	40	93	14	15	2	0	6	12	1	14	.161	
Freddy Galvis	115	450	55	120	24	1	18	54	4	21	.267	
Zack Godley	4	1	0	0	0	0	0	0	0	0	.000	
Randal Grichuk	151	586	75	136	29	5	31	80	2	35	.232	
Vladimir Guerrero Jr.	123	464	52	126	26	2	15	69	0	46	.272	
Lourdes Gurriel Jr.	84	314	52	87	19	2	20	50	6	20	.277	
Alen Hanson	18	43	5	7	0	0	0	4	1	3	.163	
Teoscar Hernández	125	417	58	96	19	2	26	65	6	45	.230	
Edwin Jackson	8	3	0	0	0	0	0	0	0	0	.000	
Danny Jansen	107	347	41	72	12	1	13	43	0	31	.207	
Elvis Luciano	21	1	0	0	0	0	0	0	0	0	.000	
Luke Maile	44	119	9	18	2	1	2	9	1	8	.151	
Reese McGuire	30	97	14	29	7	0	5	11	0	7	.299	
Billy McKinney	84	251	37	54	14	1	12	28	0	19	.215	
Kevin Pillar	5	16	1	1	0	0	0	1	0	0	.063	
Sean Reid-Foley	9	1	0	0	0	0	0	0	0	0	.000	
Aaron Sanchez	23	2	0	0	0	0	0	0	0	0	.000	
Justin Smoak	121	414	54	86	16	0	22	61	0	79	.208	
Eric Sogard	73	287	45	86	17	2	10	30	6	29	.300	
Marcus Stroman	21	2	0	0	0	0	0	0	0	0	.000	
Beau Taylor	1	2	0	0	0	0	0	0	0	0	.000	
Rowdy Tellez	111	370	49	84	19	0	21	54	1	29	.227	
Trent Thornton	29	3	2	2	0	0	0	0	0	0	.667	
Richard Ureña	30	74	4	18	6	0	0	4	0	2	.243	
Breyvic Valera	5	15	2	4	1	0	1	3	0	0	.267	
Jacob Waguespack	14	2	0	0	0	0	0	0	0	1	.000	
T. J. Zeuch	3	1	0	0	0	0	0	0	0	0	.000	
Team totals	162	5493	726	1299	270	21	247	697	51	509	.236	

=== Pitching ===
Note: G = Games pitched; GS = Games started; W = Wins; L = Losses; SV = Saves; ERA = Earned run average; WHIP = Walks plus hits per inning pitched; IP = Innings pitched; H = Hits allowed; R = Total runs allowed; ER = Earned runs allowed; W = Walks allowed; K = Strikeouts; Ref. = Reference

Player	G	GS	W	L	SV	ERA	WHIP	IP	H	R	ER	BB	K	Ref.
Jason Adam	23	0	3	0	0	2.91	1.15	21 2/3	15	8	7	10	18	
Joe Biagini	50	0	3	1	1	3.78	1.34	50	50	22	21	17	50	
Ryan Borucki	2	2	0	1	0	10.80	3.15	6 2/3	15	10	8	6	6	
Buddy Boshers	28	1	0	3	0	4.05	1.50	20	20	10	9	10	26	
Clay Buchholz	12	12	2	5	0	6.56	1.49	59	72	44	43	16	39	
Jimmy Cordero	1	0	0	1	0	6.75	1.50	1 1/3	2	1	1	0	0	
Yennsy Díaz	1	0	0	0	0	27.00	7.50	2/3	1	2	2	4	0	
Ryan Dull	1	0	0	0	0	6.75	0.75	1 1/3	1	1	1	0	3	
Ryan Feierabend	2	1	0	1	0	11.12	2.12	5 2/3	11	7	7	1	4	
Wilmer Font	23	14	2	3	0	3.66	1.14	39 1/3	34	16	16	11	53	
Sam Gaviglio	52	0	4	2	0	4.61	1.12	95 2/3	85	51	49	22	88	
Ken Giles	53	0	2	3	23	1.87	1.00	53	36	11	11	17	83	
Zack Godley	6	0	1	0	0	3.94	1.38	16	15	7	7	7	12	
Javy Guerra	11	0	0	0	0	3.86	1.21	14	12	6	6	5	15	
Daniel Hudson	45	1	6	3	2	3.00	1.27	48	38	18	16	23	48	
Edwin Jackson	8	5	1	5	0	11.12	2.19	28 1/3	49	41	35	13	19	
Anthony Kay	3	2	1	0	0	5.79	1.43	14	15	9	9	5	13	
Nick Kingham	11	0	3	1	0	3.00	1.52	21	24	7	7	8	14	
Derek Law	58	4	1	2	5	4.90	1.66	60 2/3	61	36	33	40	67	
Elvis Luciano	25	0	1	0	0	5.35	1.78	33 2/3	36	20	20	24	27	
Luke Maile	41	0	0	0	0	0.00	0.50	2	1	0	0	0	3	
Tim Mayza	68	0	1	3	0	4.91	1.40	51 1/3	45	29	28	27	55	
Thomas Pannone	37	7	3	6	0	6.16	1.42	73	73	51	50	31	69	
David Phelps	17	1	0	0	0	3.63	1.21	17 1/3	14	7	7	7	18	
Neil Ramírez	6	1	0	0	0	5.40	1.68	8 1/3	8	5	5	6	6	
Sean Reid-Foley	9	6	2	4	0	4.26	1.71	31 2/3	33	20	15	21	28	
Clayton Richard	10	10	1	5	0	5.96	1.57	45 1/3	53	33	30	18	22	
Jordan Romano	17	0	0	2	0	7.63	1.70	15 1/3	17	14	13	9	21	
Zac Rosscup	2	0	0	0	0	27.00	5.00	1	3	4	3	2	2	
Aaron Sanchez	23	23	3	14	0	6.07	1.69	112 2/3	131	82	76	59	99	
Justin Shafer	34	0	2	1	1	3.86	1.66	39 2/3	41	19	17	25	39	
Matt Shoemaker	5	5	3	0	0	1.57	0.87	28 2/3	16	7	5	9	24	
Brock Stewart	10	0	4	0	0	8.31	1.57	21 2/3	28	21	20	6	16	
Marcus Stroman	21	21	6	11	0	2.96	1.23	124 2/3	118	50	41	35	99	
Ryan Tepera	23	1	0	2	0	4.98	1.29	21 2/3	20	12	12	8	14	
Trent Thornton	32	29	6	9	0	4.84	1.41	154 1/3	156	87	83	61	149	
Richard Ureña	22	0	0	0	0	36.00	5.00	1	4	4	4	1	0	
Jacob Waguespack	16	13	5	5	0	4.38	1.33	78	75	43	38	29	63	
T. J. Zeuch	5	3	1	2	0	4.76	1.46	22 2/3	22	13	12	11	20	
Team totals	162	162	67	95	33	4.79	1.43	1440 1/3	1450	828	767	604	1332	

== Transactions ==
=== March ===
- On March 28, placed Ryan Borucki, Clay Buchholz, Jonathan Davis, David Phelps, and Ryan Tepera on the 10-day injured list, recalled Rowdy Tellez, and selected the contract of Javy Guerra.

=== April ===
- On April 1, placed Clayton Richard on the 10-day injured list, and recalled Sean Reid-Foley.
- On April 2, transferred Dalton Pompey to the 60-day injured list, recalled Anthony Alford, acquired Alen Hanson, Derek Law, and Juan De Paula from the San Francisco Giants for Kevin Pillar, and acquired Socrates Brito from the San Diego Padres for Rodrigo Orozco.
- On April 4, optioned Anthony Alford and Sean Reid-Foley, and recalled Socrates Brito and Alen Hanson.
- On April 7, sent Clay Buchholz on a rehab assignment to the Triple-A Buffalo Bisons.
- On April 12, sent Ryan Tepera on a rehab assignment to the Triple-A Buffalo Bisons.
- On April 13, optioned Richard Ureña and activated Clay Buchholz.
- On April 15, transferred Ryan Borucki to the 60-day injured list, optioned Lourdes Gurriel Jr., and selected the contract of Eric Sogard.
- On April 18, designated Javy Guerra for assignment and activated Ryan Tepera.
- On April 21, placed Matt Shoemaker on the 10-day injured list and recalled Richard Ureña.
- On April 22, outrighted Javy Guerra to Triple-A Buffalo.
- On April 26, optioned Richard Ureña and selected the contract of Vladimir Guerrero Jr.

=== May ===
- On May 3, designated Alen Hanson for assignment and selected the contract of Derek Law.
- On May 7, outrighted Alen Hanson to Triple-A Buffalo.
- On May 9, optioned Thomas Pannone.
- On May 10, placed Clay Buchholz on the 10-day injured list, designated Socrates Brito for assignment, recalled Jonathan Davis and Thomas Pannone, and selected the contract of Javy Guerra.
- On May 15, transferred David Phelps and Matt Shoemaker to the 60-day injured list, optioned Thomas Pannone, selected the contract of Edwin Jackson, and claimed Jimmy Cordero off waivers from the Washington Nationals.
- On May 16, outrighted Socrates Brito, optioned Teoscar Hernandez, and recalled Richard Ureña.
- On May 18, sent Clayton Richard on a rehab assignment to the Triple-A Buffalo Bisons, designated Javy Guerra for assignment, and selected the contract of Ryan Feierabend.
- On May 21, placed Ryan Tepera on the 10-day injured list and recalled Jimmy Cordero.
- On May 23, optioned Jimmy Cordero and activated Clayton Richard. Later, designated Jimmy Cordero for assignment and claimed Zac Rosscup off waivers from the Seattle Mariners.
- On May 24, placed Elvis Luciano on the bereavement list, designated Ryan Feierabend for assignment, optioned Billy McKinney and Richard Ureña, recalled Thomas Pannone and Lourdes Gurriel Jr., and selected the contract of Cavan Biggio.
- On May 26, placed Tim Mayza on the 10-day injured list, outrighted Ryan Feierabend to Triple-A Buffalo, and recalled Jacob Waguespack.
- On May 28, designated Zac Rosscup for assignment and selected the contract of Justin Shafer.
- On May 29, placed Jacob Waguespack on the 10-day injured list and activated Elvis Luciano.

=== June ===
- On June 1, outrighted Zac Rosscup to Triple-A Buffalo.
- On June 3, optioned Justin Shafer.
- On June 4, activated Tim Mayza.
- On June 5, optioned Jonathan Davis, recalled Teoscar Hernández, and sent David Phelps on a rehab assignment to the Advanced-A Dunedin Blue Jays.
- On June 12, placed Ken Giles on the 10-day injured list, transferred Clay Buchholz to the 60-day injured list, and selected the contract of Jordan Romano.
- On June 13, placed Elvis Luciano on the 10-day injured list, transferred Ryan Tepera to the 60-day injured list, recalled Justin Shafer, and acquired Nick Kingham from the Pittsburgh Pirates for cash considerations.
- On June 15, optioned Thomas Pannone and activated Nick Kingham.
- On June 16, sent Jacob Waguespack on a rehab assignment to the Triple-A Buffalo Bisons.
- On June 17, optioned Justin Shafer, transferred Elvis Luciano to the 60-day injured list, and activated David Phelps.
- On June 18, placed Edwin Jackson and Justin Smoak on the 10-day injured list, and recalled Billy McKinney and Justin Shafer.
- On June 20, optioned Justin Shafer and activated Ken Giles.
- On June 23, optioned Jordan Romano and recalled Sean Reid-Foley.
- On June 26, sent Ryan Borucki on a rehab assignment to the Rookie-level Gulf Coast League Blue Jays.
- On June 28, optioned Billy McKinney and activated Justin Smoak.

=== July ===
- On July 1, sent Ryan Borucki on a rehab assignment to the Dunedin Blue Jays.
- On July 2, sent Edwin Jackson on a rehab assignment to the Triple-A Buffalo Bisons.
- On July 3, sent Dalton Pompey on a rehab assignment to the Rookie-level Gulf Coast League Blue Jays, and optioned Sean Reid-Foley.
- On July 4, optioned Jacob Waguespack, and recalled Thomas Pannone.
- On July 5, optioned Thomas Pannone, and recalled Jonathan Davis.
- On July 7, optioned Jonathan Davis, and recalled Justin Shafer.
- On July 8, sent Dalton Pompey on a rehab assignment to the Advanced-A Dunedin Blue Jays.
- On July 11, sent Ryan Borucki on a rehab assignment to the Triple-A Buffalo Bisons.
- On July 14, placed Clayton Richard on the 10-day injured list, and activated Edwin Jackson.
- On July 15, sent Dalton Pompey on a rehab assignment to the Triple-A Buffalo Bisons, optioned Rowdy Tellez, and recalled Billy McKinney.
- On July 16, designated Edwin Jackson for assignment, and recalled Jacob Waguespack.
- On July 17, acquired Wilmer Font from the New York Mets for cash considerations.
- On July 18, designated Nick Kingham for assignment, and recalled Thomas Pannone.
- On July 19, optioned Thomas Pannone, and activated Wilmer Font.
- On July 21, outrighted Nick Kingham to the Triple-A Buffalo Bisons.
- On July 22, placed Trent Thornton on the 10-day injured list, and activated Ryan Borucki and Dalton Pompey. Pompey was later designated for assignment.
- On July 27, placed Luke Maile on the 10-day injured list, and recalled Reese McGuire.
- On July 28, acquired two players to be named later from the Tampa Bay Rays for Eric Sogard, and acquired Anthony Kay and Simeon Woods Richardson from the New York Mets for Marcus Stroman and cash considerations.
- On July 29, selected the contract of Bo Bichette, and recalled Thomas Pannone.
- On July 30, outrighted Dalton Pompey to the Triple-A Buffalo Bisons, acquired Thomas Hatch from the Chicago Cubs for David Phelps and cash considerations, and recalled Sean Reid-Foley.
- On July 31, placed Ryan Borucki on the 10-day injured list, claimed Brock Stewart off waivers from the Los Angeles Dodgers and optioned him to Triple-A, acquired Derek Fisher from the Houston Astros for Aaron Sanchez, Cal Stevenson, and Joe Biagini, acquired Kyle Johnston from the Washington Nationals for Daniel Hudson, and selected the contract of Buddy Boshers from the Triple-A Buffalo Bisons.

=== August ===
- On August 1, activated Trent Thornton, and selected the contract of Jason Adam.
- On August 2, optioned Billy McKinney and selected the contract of Nick Kingham.
- On August 3, placed Nick Kingham on the 10-day injured list, and recalled Yennsy Díaz.
- On August 5, optioned Yennsy Díaz, and recalled Brock Stewart.
- On August 7, designated David Paulino for assignment, and claimed Zack Godley off waivers from the Arizona Diamondbacks.
- On August 8, optioned Brock Stewart and activated Zack Godley.
- On August 9, sent Clay Buchholz on a rehab assignment to the Rookie-level Gulf Coast League Blue Jays.
- On August 10, placed Lourdes Gurriel Jr. on the 10-day injured list and recalled Brock Stewart.
- On August 11, optioned Jason Adam, selected the contract of Neil Ramírez and transferred Ryan Borucki to the 60-day injured list.
- On August 12, recalled Billy McKinney.
- On August 13, optioned Brock Stewart, and recalled Rowdy Tellez.
- On August 16, claimed Beau Taylor off waivers from the Oakland Athletics and optioned him.
- On August 17, sent Ryan Tepera on a rehab assignment to the Advanced-A Dunedin Blue Jays.
- On August 18, sent Clay Buchholz on a rehab assignment to the Advanced-A Dunedin Blue Jays.
- On August 20, optioned Thomas Pannone, and recalled Richard Ureña.
- On August 21, optioned Sean Reid-Foley, and recalled Jason Adam.
- On August 22, placed Ken Giles on the paternity list, and recalled Jordan Romano.
- On August 23, sent Ryan Tepera on a rehab assignment to the Triple-A Buffalo Bisons.
- On August 24, optioned Richard Ureña, and recalled Brock Stewart.
- On August 25, activated Clay Buchholz and Ken Giles, designated Nick Kingham for assignment, and optioned Justin Shafer and Brock Stewart.
- On August 31, sent Clayton Richard on a rehab assignment to the Triple-A Buffalo Bisons.

=== September ===
- On September 1, designated Neil Ramírez for assignment, activated Ryan Tepera, acquired Curtis Taylor and Edisson Gonzalez from the Tampa Bay Rays, and recalled Beau Taylor.
- On September 2, activated Clayton Richard and recalled Thomas Pannone.
- On September 3, recalled Anthony Alford, Jonathan Davis and Richard Ureña, selected the contract of T.J. Zeuch, designated Zack Godley for assignment, and outrighted Neil Ramírez to the Triple-A Buffalo Bisons.
- On September 5, recalled Brock Stewart and Justin Shafer.
- On September 6, outrighted Zack Godley to the Triple-A Buffalo Bisons.
- On September 7, designated Beau Taylor for assignment and selected the contract of Anthony Kay.
- On September 12, activated Elvis Luciano and released Clayton Richard.
- On September 14, activated Lourdes Gurriel Jr. and Luke Maile.
- On September 18, placed Tim Mayza on the 60-day injured list, and claimed Ryan Dull off waivers from the New York Yankees.
- On September 20, designated Ryan Dull for assignment, and claimed Breyvic Valera off waivers from the New York Yankees.
- On September 24, outrighted Ryan Dull to the Triple-A Buffalo Bisons.
- On September 25, placed Lourdes Gurriel Jr. on the 60-day injured list, selected the contract of Ryan Dull, and recalled Yennsy Díaz.
- On September 30, recalled Sein Reid-Foley, Héctor Pérez, Patrick Murphy and Julian Merryweather.

== Farm system ==
(Updated to games played September 2, 2019)

Level	Team	League	Manager	Win–loss record	Position	Postseason	Ref.
Triple-A	Buffalo Bisons	International League	Bob Meacham	71–69	North Division; 3rd place 4½ GB	Did not qualify	
Double-A	New Hampshire Fisher Cats	Eastern League	Mike Mordecai	31–36 (first half); 32–40 (second half)	Eastern Division; 5th place (first half); 8 GB; 5th place (second half); 9 GB	Did not qualify	
Advanced-A	Dunedin Blue Jays	Florida State League	Cesar Martin	41–24 (first half); 39–31 (second half)	North Division; 1st place (first half) +5½ G 1st place (second half) +2½ G	Qualified, Postseason Cancelled (Note: The impending threat of Hurricane Dorian forced the cancellation of the league's entire postseason. Dunedin had clinched the first half and was in first place for the second half at the time of the cancellation)	
Class-A	Lansing Lugnuts	Midwest League	Dallas McPherson	32–37 (first half); 36–34 (second half)	Eastern Division; 6th place (first half); 12 GB; 4th place (second half); 6½ GB	Did not qualify	
Short Season-A	Vancouver Canadians	Northwest League	Casey Candaele	15–23 (first half); 15–23 (second half)	North Division; 4th place (first half); 8 GB; 4th place (second half); 8 GB	Did not qualify	
Rookie Advanced	Bluefield Blue Jays	Appalachian League	Luis Hurtado	31–36	East Division; 4th place 10½ GB	Did not qualify	
Rookie	GCL Blue Jays	Gulf Coast League	Dennis Holmberg	27–23	North Division; 3rd place 7 GB	Did not qualify	
Rookie	DSL Blue Jays	Dominican Summer League	John Tamargo Jr.	35–35	Baseball City Division; 3rd place 11½ GB	Did not qualify	
