= Daniel Vogelbach =

American baseball player (born 1992)

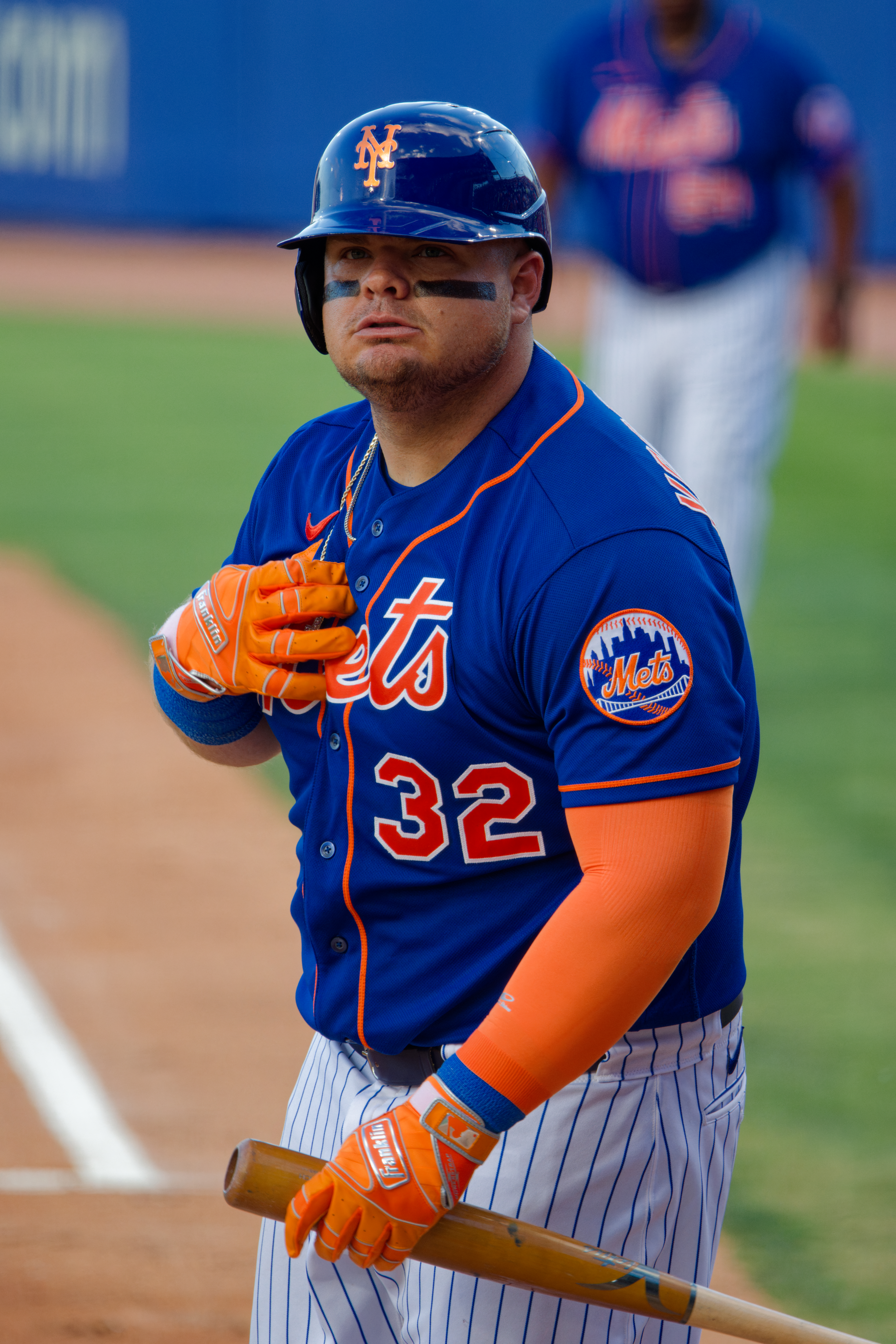
- Vogelbach with the New York Mets in 2023

Milwaukee Brewers – No. 92
- Designated hitter / First baseman / Coach
- Born: December 17, 1992 (age 33); North Fort Myers, Florida, U.S.
- Batted: Left Threw: Right

MLB debut
- September 12, 2016, for the Seattle Mariners

Last MLB appearance
- June 12, 2024, for the Toronto Blue Jays

MLB statistics
- Batting average: .219
- Home runs: 81
- Runs batted in: 246
- Stats at Baseball Reference

Teams
- As player: Seattle Mariners (2016–2020); Toronto Blue Jays (2020); Milwaukee Brewers (2020–2021); Pittsburgh Pirates (2022); New York Mets (2022–2023); Toronto Blue Jays (2024); As coach: Pittsburgh Pirates (2025); Milwaukee Brewers (2026–present)

Career highlights and awards
- As player: All-Star (2019); As coach: World Series champion (2026)

Daniel Taylor Vogelbach (born December 17, 1992) is an American professional baseball coach and former first baseman and designated hitter who is currently an assistant hitting coach for the Milwaukee Brewers of Major League Baseball (MLB). Vogelbach played in MLB from 2016 to 2024 for the Seattle Mariners, Toronto Blue Jays, Brewers, Pittsburgh Pirates, and New York Mets.

Vogelbach played baseball at Bishop Verot High School and played varsity baseball. He was drafted in the second round of the 2011 MLB draft by the Chicago Cubs. After spending multiple seasons in the Cubs farm system, Vogelbach was traded to the Mariners in July 2016 and made his MLB debut two months later.

Between 2016 and 2018, Vogelbach received sporadic playing time at the major league level and was frequently sent down to the minor leagues. In 2019, Vogelbach played a career-high 144 games and received an All-Star selection for his contributions at first base and designated hitter. After starting the shortened 2020 season batting .094, Vogelbach was designated for assignment by the Mariners. He played a brief two-game stint with the Blue Jays before he was waived, finishing the season with the Brewers and remaining with the team for the 2021 season, after which he was non-tendered. Vogelbach signed with the Pirates as a free agent in 2022, and was traded to the Mets midway through the season. The Mets non-tendered him after the 2023 season, and he signed as a free agent with the Blue Jays in February 2024.

Vogelbach became a coach for the Pirates in 2025, joining the Brewers after the season.

== Amateur career ==
Vogelbach was born and raised in the Fort Myers, Florida area. He attended Bishop Verot High School in Fort Myers, Florida. He committed to play college baseball for the Florida Gators. As a senior in high school, he had a .551 batting average with nine home runs and was The News-Press All-Area Baseball Player of the Year. At the time, he was listed at 5 feet 11 inches (1.80 m) tall and weighing 285 pounds (129 kg).

== Professional career ==
=== Chicago Cubs ===
The Chicago Cubs selected Vogelbach in the second round of the 2011 MLB draft. He made his professional debut with the Arizona League Cubs. In six games, he had a .292 average with one home run in 24 at bats. In 2012, Vogelbach started the season with the Arizona League Cubs and was promoted to the Boise Hawks during the season. At the time, he weighed over 300 pounds (140 kg). He finished the season with a slash line of .322/.410/.641 with 17 home runs and 62 runs batted in (RBI) over 245 at bats in 61 games. In 2013, Vogelbach started the season with the Kane County Cougars and was promoted to the Daytona Cubs near the end of the season. He finished the year with a .284/.375/.449 slash line and 19 home runs over 483 at bats in 131 games.

Prior to the 2014 season, he lost over 30 pounds (14 kg) to help improve his defense, and escape being labelled a "designated-hitter-only". That year, he batted .268 with 16 home runs for the Daytona Cubs. After the season, he played for the Mesa Solar Sox in the Arizona Fall League. The Cubs added him to their 40-man roster on November 21. He played for the Tennessee Smokies of the Double-A Southern League in 2015. Vogelbach began the 2016 season with the Iowa Cubs of the Triple-A Pacific Coast League (PCL).

=== Seattle Mariners ===
On July 20, 2016, the Cubs traded Vogelbach and Paul Blackburn to the Seattle Mariners for Mike Montgomery and Jordan Pries. Eric Longenhagen wrote at Fangraphs, "He’s not a good athlete and has issues with range, footwork, flexibility, and throwing accuracy. He’ll make the occasional, spectacular-looking, effort-based play but hasn’t shown enough technical refinement in his five pro seasons to convince scouts he can play a position... [he has] a complete lack of defensive or base-running value."

The Mariners assigned him to the Tacoma Rainiers of the PCL and promoted him to the major leagues on September 12, after the Rainiers were eliminated from the postseason. He made his major-league debut that night as a pinch hitter against the Los Angeles Angels, grounding into a fielder's choice in his first at bat. The next night, he got the first MLB start and hit, recording a single to right in his third plate appearance. In 2016 in the majors, Vogelbach had a .083/.154/.183 slash line in 8 games with no home runs.

In 2017, playing again for the Tacoma Rainiers, Vogelbach hit .290 with 17 home runs and 83 RBIs. He competed in the Triple-A home run derby, advancing to the final round before losing to Bryce Brentz. He was called up briefly to the Mariners two times, playing seven games in late April then one game in May, before being recalled on September 4, after the end of the Rainiers' season. Vogelbach started only one game, serving as a pinch hitter and backup first baseman behind Yonder Alonso and Danny Valencia. In MLB in 2017, Vogelbach slashed .214/.290/.250 without no home runs in 31 plate appearances.

In 2018, Vogelbach split time between Seattle and Tacoma for the third consecutive year. He was on the Mariners roster for one week in April, a separate week in May, ten days in July, and most of September, following the conclusion of the Triple-A season. He hit his first MLB home run on April 23, off Chris Hatcher of the Oakland Athletics, tagging another home run off the A's the next day. He finished the year with the Mariners batting .207/.324/.368 for Seattle in 102 plate appearances. He led the Rainiers with 20 home runs and 77 walks, with a .290 average in 84 games.

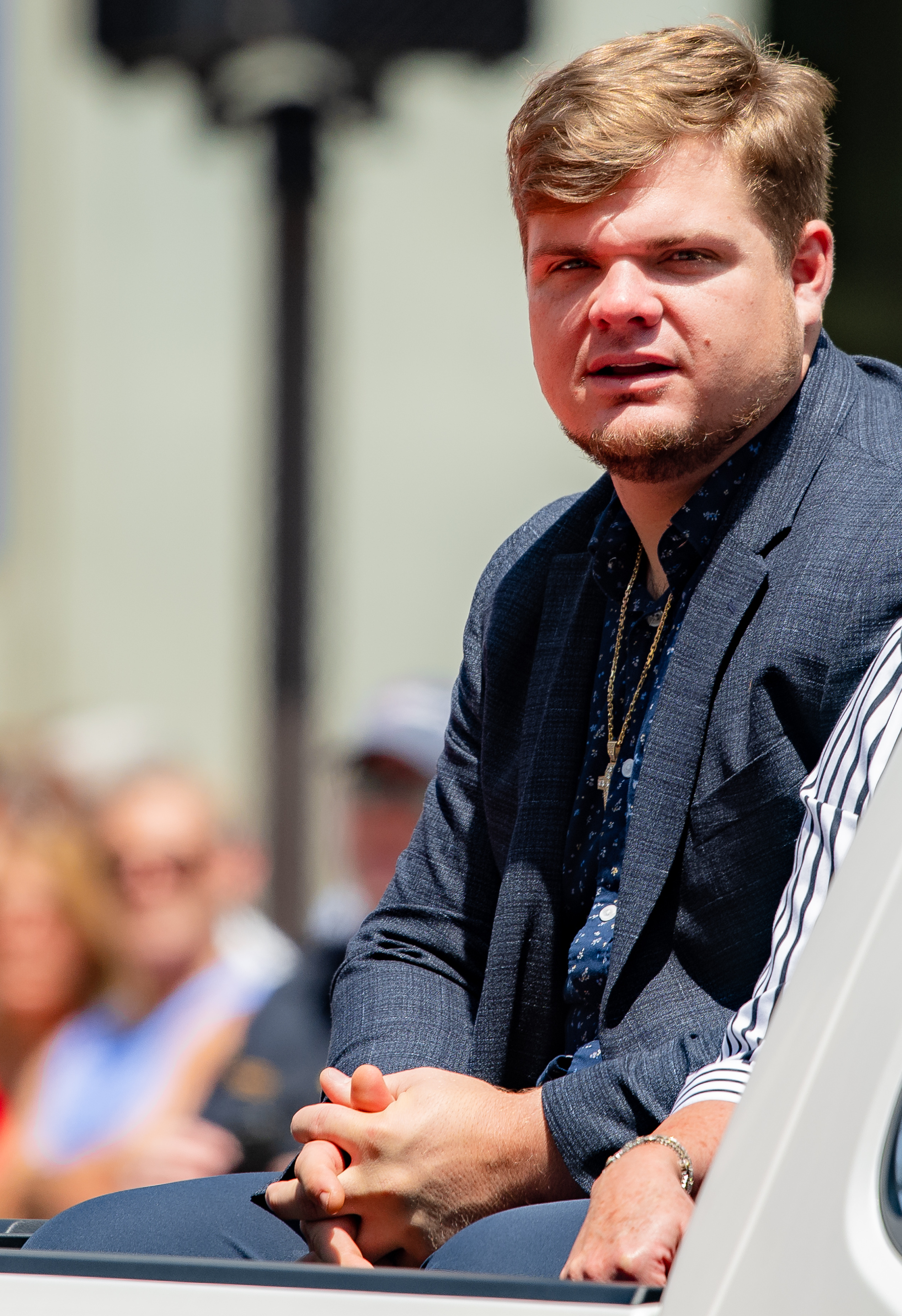
Vogelbach at 2019 All-Star Game festivities

Vogelbach made the Mariners' 2019 Opening Day roster. He represented the Mariners in the MLB All-Star Game. His on-base plus slugging was 33 percent better than the major-league average before the All-Star break, but he struggled after, hitting 34 percent worse than average. He ended 2019 batting .208/.341/.439 and led the Mariners with 30 home runs, 76 RBIs, and 92 walks. He walked in 16.5 percent of plate appearances, in the top 2 percent of MLB. He was thrown curveballs more frequently than any American League batter and swung at the lowest percentage of pitches among major leaguers.

Less than one month into the shortened 2020 season, Vogelbach was designated for assignment by the Mariners on August 19, after he began the season batting 5-for-53 in 18 games. In parts of five seasons with Seattle, Vogelbach batted .196 with 36 home runs and 95 RBIs in 223 games.

=== Toronto Blue Jays ===
On August 23, 2020, the Toronto Blue Jays acquired Vogelbach for cash considerations. He was hitless for the Blue Jays in 5 plate appearances, with a walk and two strikeouts. On September 1, the Blue Jays designated Vogelbach for assignment.

=== Milwaukee Brewers ===
On September 3, 2020, the Milwaukee Brewers claimed Vogelbach off waivers. In 19 games with the Brewers, Vogelbach slashed .328/.418/.569 with four home runs, playing primarily at designated hitter (DH). He played in both Brewers' games in the National League (NL) Wild Card Series, hitting one double in five at bats.

He returned to the Brewers for 2021 on a $1.4 million contract. On June 23, he was placed on the 10-day injured list with a hamstring strain, then transferred to the 60-day injured list on August 22. He was activated on September 1. In 2021, he slashed .219/.349/.381 with nine home runs and 24 RBIs in 93 games, playing 59 games at first base, 36 games as a pinch hitter, and 3 games as a DH. His arm strength was in the bottom 1 percent of major leaguers. He batted 0-for-1 with a walk in the NL Division Series. On November 30, Vogelbach was non-tendered by the Brewers, making him a free agent.

=== Pittsburgh Pirates ===
On March 15, 2022, Vogelbach signed a one-year contract with a team option for a second year with the Pittsburgh Pirates. On May 17, Vogelbach hit the first triple of his career off of Keegan Thompson of the Chicago Cubs. On May 24, he was placed on the injured list with a hamstring strain, ultimately being activated on June 3. In 75 games with the Pirates, he batted .228 with 12 home runs and 34 RBIs, playing 68 games at DH, 10 as a pinch hitter, and 5 at first base.

=== New York Mets ===
On July 22, 2022, the Pirates traded Vogelbach to the New York Mets for Colin Holderman. On August 3, Vogelbach hit his first home run as a Met, a grand slam off Washington Nationals reliever Jordan Weems, becoming the 11th Mets player to hit a grand slam as his first home run with the team. In 2022 for the Mets, he batted .255, as a DH and pinch hitter. His sprint speed was in the bottom 2 percent in the major leagues. In the Wild Card Series, he was hitless in eight plate appearances with one sacrifice fly.

On November 6, the Mets exercised their option with Vogelbach for the 2023 season. In 2023, he hit .233/.339/.404 with 13 home runs and 48 RBI as a DH and pinch hitter. For the second season in a row, his sprint speed was in the bottom 2 percent in the major leagues. On November 17, the Mets did not tender Vogelbach a contract, making him a free agent.

=== Toronto Blue Jays (second stint) ===
On February 16, 2024, Vogelbach signed a minor league contract with the Toronto Blue Jays. On March 24, the Blue Jays announced that Vogelbach had made their Opening Day roster. In 31 games for Toronto, he batted .186/.278/.300 with one home run and eight RBI. On June 14, Vogelbach was designated for assignment after the Blue Jays recalled Addison Barger. He was released by the Blue Jays four days later.

== Coaching career ==
=== Pittsburgh Pirates ===
On February 12, 2025, it was announced Vogelbach would join the Pittsburgh Pirates as a special hitting assistant, ending his playing career.

=== Milwaukee Brewers ===
On January 5, 2026, the Milwaukee Brewers hired Vogelbach as an assistant hitting coach alongside Guillermo Martínez. He won a championship ring when the Brewers won the 2026 World Series.

== See also ==
- List of Major League Baseball ultimate grand slams
