= Yennsy Díaz =

Dominican baseball player (born 1996)

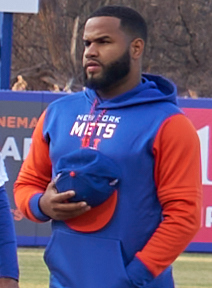
- Díaz with the Syracuse Mets in 2022
- Pitcher
- Born: November 15, 1996 (age 29); Azua, Dominican Republic
- Batted: Right Threw: Right

MLB debut
- August 4, 2019, for the Toronto Blue Jays

Last MLB appearance
- September 13, 2021, for the New York Mets

MLB statistics
- Win–loss record: 0–2
- Earned run average: 5.96
- Strikeouts: 21
- Stats at Baseball Reference

Teams
- Toronto Blue Jays (2019); New York Mets (2021)

Yennsy Manuel Díaz (born November 15, 1996) is a Dominican former professional baseball pitcher. He has previously played in Major League Baseball (MLB) for the Toronto Blue Jays and New York Mets.

== Career ==
=== Toronto Blue Jays ===
Díaz signed with the Blue Jays as an international free agent on July 3, 2014. He began the 2015 season assigned to the Rookie-level Dominican Summer League Blue Jays, and was promoted to the Gulf Coast League Blue Jays for the final month of the season. In 56 1/3 total innings pitched, Díaz posted a 4–4 win–loss record, 2.88 earned run average (ERA), and 58 strikeouts. He played the entire 2016 season with the Rookie Advanced Bluefield Blue Jays, and went 4–6 with a 5.79 ERA and 48 strikeouts in 56 innings. Díaz made his full-season debut in 2017, pitching the year with the Class-A Lansing Lugnuts. In 77 innings, he pitched to a 5–2 record, 4.79 ERA, and 82 strikeouts.

Díaz began the 2018 campaign with Lansing, and was promoted to the Advanced-A Dunedin Blue Jays in late May. He would finish the season with a 10–5 record, 3.05 ERA, and 125 strikeouts in 147 1/3 innings. The Blue Jays added Díaz to their 40-man roster after the 2018 season to protect him from the Rule 5 draft.

He opened the 2019 season with the New Hampshire Fisher Cats. On August 3, the Blue Jays promoted Díaz to the major leagues. Díaz made his major league debut on August 4, allowing two runs over 2/3 of an inning pitched. He was returned to New Hampshire on August 5.

With the 2019 Toronto Blue Jays, Díaz appeared in 1 game, compiling a 0–0 record with 27.00 ERA and no strikeouts in 0.2 innings pitched. He spent the 2020 season at the Blue Jays alternate training site and did not play in a game for the big league club.

=== New York Mets ===
On January 27, 2021, Díaz was traded to the New York Mets alongside Sean Reid-Foley and Josh Winckowski in exchange for Steven Matz. Díaz split the 2021 season with the Triple-A Syracuse Mets and the New York Mets. For Triple-A Syracuse, through 15 appearances, Díaz went 0–3 with a 6.75 ERA and 19 strikeouts. Díaz made 20 appearances for New York, going 0–2 with a 5.40 ERA and 21 strikeouts.

On April 7, 2022, Díaz was designated for assignment by the Mets following the acquisition of Adonis Medina. He cleared waivers and was outrighted to Triple-A on April 11. He made 20 appearances for Triple-A Syracuse, working to an 0–2 record and 6.75 ERA with 22 strikeouts in 28.0 innings pitched. On August 8, Díaz was released by the Mets organization.

=== Sultanes de Monterrey ===
On February 20, 2023, Díaz signed with the Sultanes de Monterrey of the Mexican League. In 8 starts for Monterrey, Díaz recorded a 5.23 ERA with 24 strikeouts across 32 2/3 innings pitched.

=== El Águila de Veracruz ===
On April 23, 2024, Díaz signed with El Águila de Veracruz of the Mexican League. In 6 games for Veracruz, he struggled to a 12.71 ERA with 4 strikeouts across 5 2/3 innings of work. Díaz was released by the club on May 14.
