= Gabe Speier =

American baseball player (born 1995)

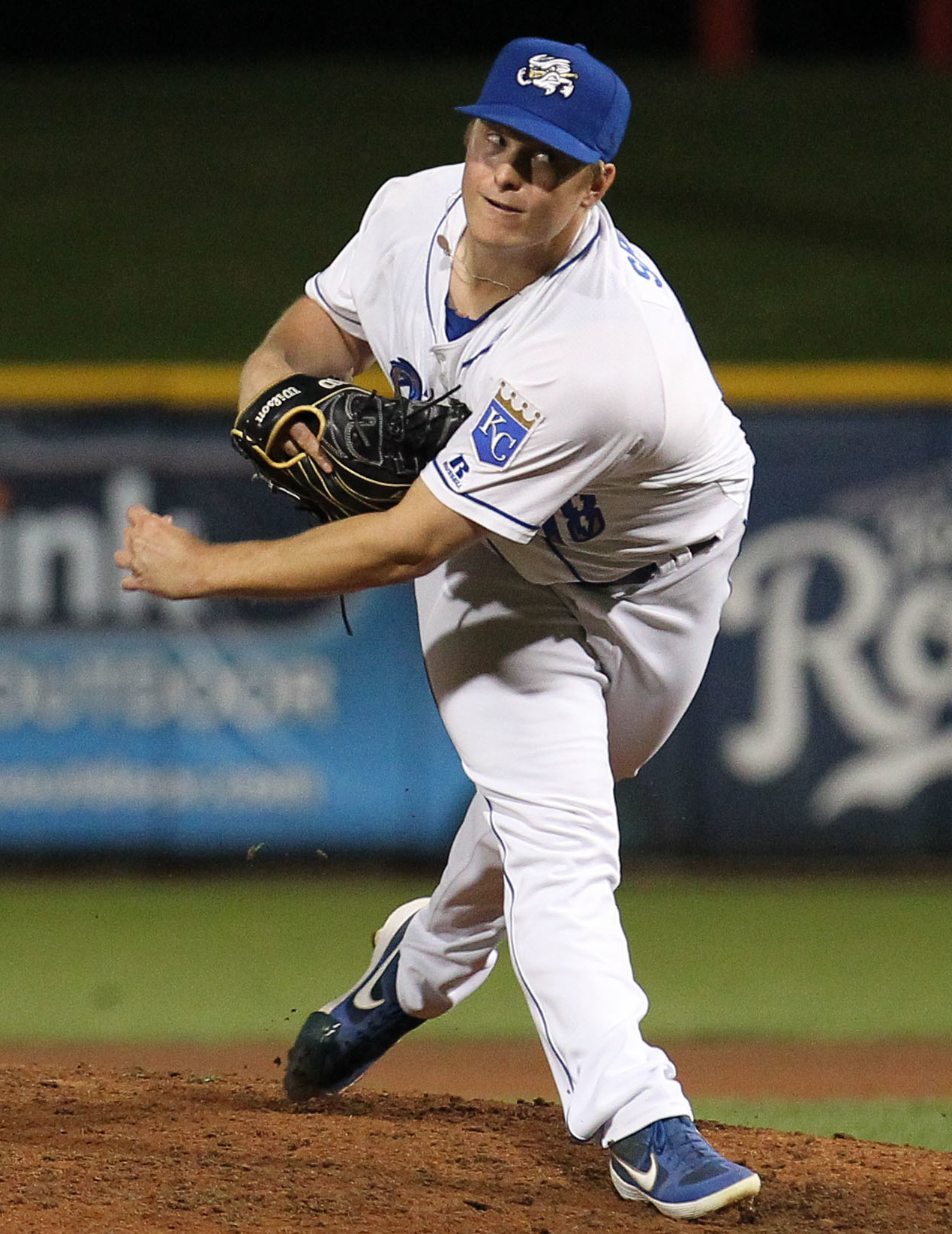
- Speier with the Omaha Storm Chasers in 2019

Seattle Mariners – No. 55
- Pitcher
- Born: April 12, 1995 (age 31); Santa Barbara, California, U.S.
- Bats: Left Throws: Left

MLB debut
- September 5, 2019, for the Kansas City Royals

MLB statistics (through 2026 season)
- Win–loss record: 8–12
- Earned run average: 3.50
- Strikeouts: 259
- Stats at Baseball Reference

Teams
- Kansas City Royals (2019–2022); Seattle Mariners (2023–present)
Medals
Men's baseball
Representing United States
World Baseball Classic
Silver medal – second place	2026 Miami	Team

Gabriel James Speier (born April 12, 1995) is an American professional baseball pitcher for the Seattle Mariners of Major League Baseball (MLB). He made his MLB debut in 2019 with the Kansas City Royals.

== Career ==
=== Amateur ===
Speier attended Dos Pueblos High School in Goleta, California. As a senior, he had 87 strikeouts in 57 2/3 innings and also had a .412 batting average and helped Dos Pueblos win its league title. He committed to playing baseball at UC Santa Barbara but did not end up attending.

=== Boston Red Sox ===
The Boston Red Sox selected Speier in the 19th round, with the 563rd overall selection, of the 2013 Major League Baseball draft. He decided to turn professional, receiving a $200,000 signing bonus. Speier pitched four innings for the Gulf Coast League Red Sox in 2013. He returned to the GCL Red Sox in 2014, where he went 3–0 with a 1.55 ERA and 26 strikeouts in nine games, six of them starts.

=== Detroit Tigers ===
On December 11, 2014, the Red Sox traded Speier, Yoenis Céspedes, and Alex Wilson to the Detroit Tigers for starter Rick Porcello. Speier played for the High-A West Michigan Whitecaps in 2015 where he compiled a 4–2 record and 2.86 ERA with 36 strikeouts in 33 relief appearances.

=== Arizona Diamondbacks ===
On November 20, 2015, the Tigers traded Speier and Ian Krol to the Atlanta Braves in exchange for Cameron Maybin. However, on December 9, the Braves traded him and Shelby Miller to the Arizona Diamondbacks for Dansby Swanson, Ender Inciarte, and Aaron Blair.

Speier spent 2016 with the rookie-level Arizona League Diamondbacks, Single-A Kane County Cougars, High-A Visalia Rawhide, and Double-A Mobile BayBears, pitching to a combined 4–2 record, 2.62 ERA, and 1.20 WHIP with 49 strikeouts in 39 appearances out of the bullpen. In 2017, he pitched for the Double-A Jackson Generals, collecting a 2–6 record and 4.30 ERA with 50 strikeouts in 69 innings. Speier returned to Jackson to start the 2018 campaign.

=== Kansas City Royals ===
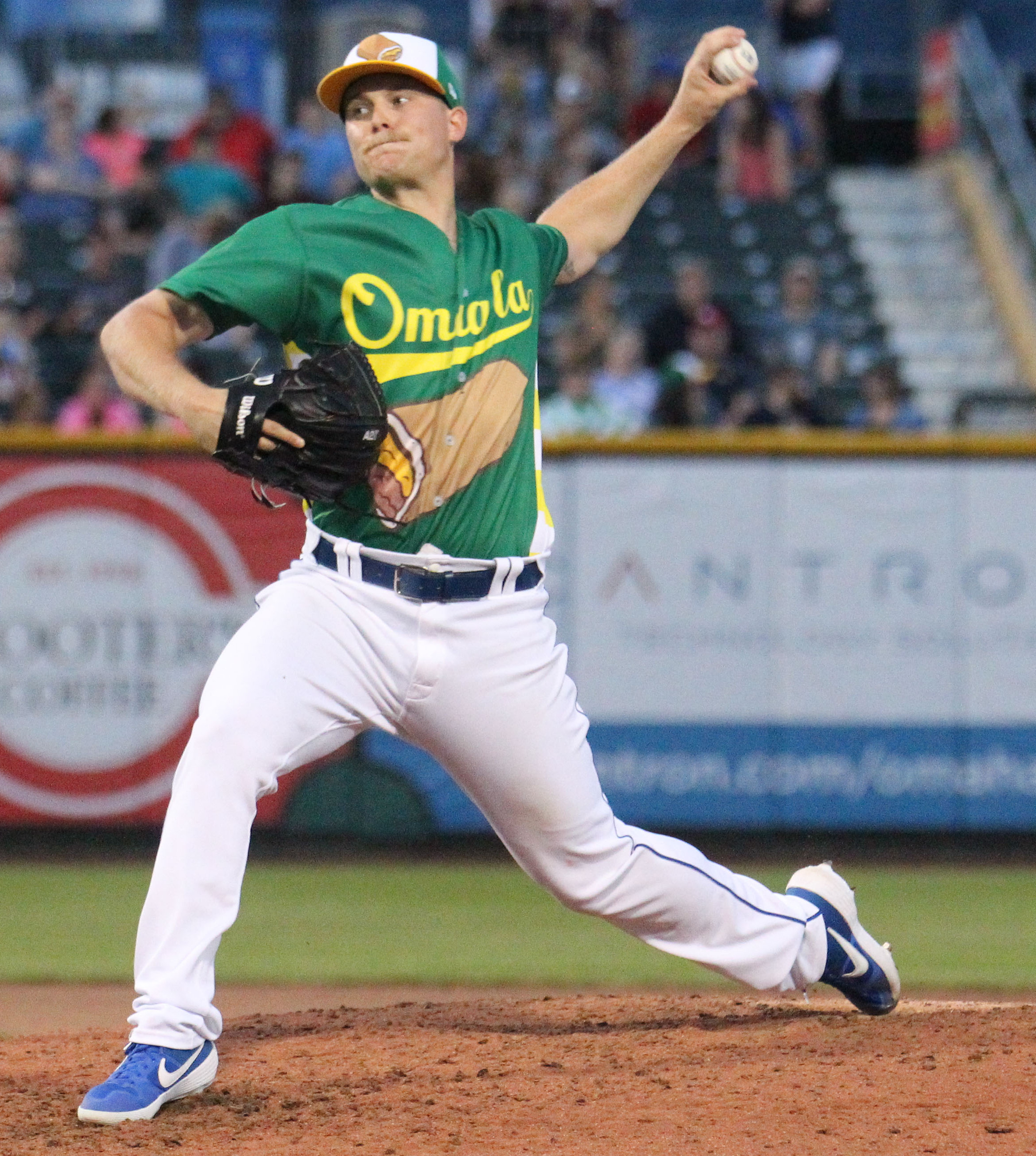
Speier with the Storm Chasers in 2019

On June 6, 2018, the Diamondbacks traded Speier and Elvis Luciano to the Kansas City Royals in exchange for Jon Jay. He was subsequently assigned to the Double-A Northwest Arkansas Naturals. In 46 relief appearances between the Generals and Naturals, he went 1–0 with a 3.39 ERA and 48 strikeouts. Speier began 2019 returning to Double-A for the third season in a row before being promoted to the Triple-A Omaha Storm Chasers at the end of May. He had a 1–5 record with a 4.48 ERA and a career-high 73 strikeouts in the minors in 2019.

On September 3, 2019, Speier was selected to the 40-man roster and promoted to the major leagues for the first time. He made his major league debut on September 5 versus the Detroit Tigers, pitching a scoreless seventh inning with two strikeouts and one walk. He pitched nine times for the Royals in September, allowing 6 runs in 7 1/3 innings and collecting 10 strikeouts.

With the 2020 Kansas City Royals, Speier appeared in 8 games, compiling a 0–1 record with 7.94 ERA and 6 strikeouts in 5 2/3 innings pitched. On November 20, Speier was designated for assignment, and the Royals sent him outright to Omaha five days later.

Speier pitched in 45 Omaha games in 2021, going 3–0 with a 2.98 ERA with 57 strikeouts. Speier was called up to the Royals on September 15, 2021, driving three hours from Omaha to Kansas City while the Royals were playing, ultimately pitching in the seventh inning that night. He pitched in 7 games for the Royals, allowing 1 run in 7 2/3 innings. Speier split time between the Royals and the Storm Chasers again in 2023, also hitting the injured list for two weeks at the end of May. He had a 2.33 ERA in 17 games in the majors, picking up 1 loss and 14 strikeouts in 19 1/3 innings.

=== Seattle Mariners ===
On November 9, 2022, Speier was claimed off waivers by the Seattle Mariners. Speier was optioned to the Triple-A Tacoma Rainiers before the 2023 season began but was called up before the third game of the season. He pitched in 69 games, by far the most in his career and in the top 15 in the American League. Speier threw a first pitch strike to 78 percent of the batters he faced, the most by any pitcher since at least 2002, when the statistic was first tracked, and up significantly from Speier's 45 percent the previous year. Speier said Mariners coaches told him to throw more strikes and also to throw more sinkers to left-handed batters and more sliders to right-handed batters. He earned his first MLB save on August 20, coming in after closer Andrés Muñoz pitched in the 8th inning. He was 2–2 with a 3.79 ERA and 64 strikeouts in 54 2/3 innings in 2023.

Speier remained a bullpen regular for the first two months of 2024, pitching in 22 games by the end of May. However, he was placed on the injured list with a strained rotator cuff in his pitching arm. Speier would pitch in just seven more games for the Mariners in 2024, only one of them a close game while the Mariners were still playing for a playoff spot. Several ugly innings before his injury hiatus ballooned his ERA from 2.31 on May 7 to his season-ending line of 5.70, to go along with 2 losses and 33 strikeouts in 23 2/3 innings.

=== International Career ===
On January 14, 2026, Gabe Speier was announced to join Team USA for the 2026 World Baseball Classic to pitch.

== Personal life ==
Speier is the nephew of former MLB infielder Chris Speier and the first cousin of Chris Speier's son, former pitcher Justin Speier.

Speier and his wife were married in November 2020. They have a child and a dog.
