= Justin Shafer =

American baseball player (born 1992)

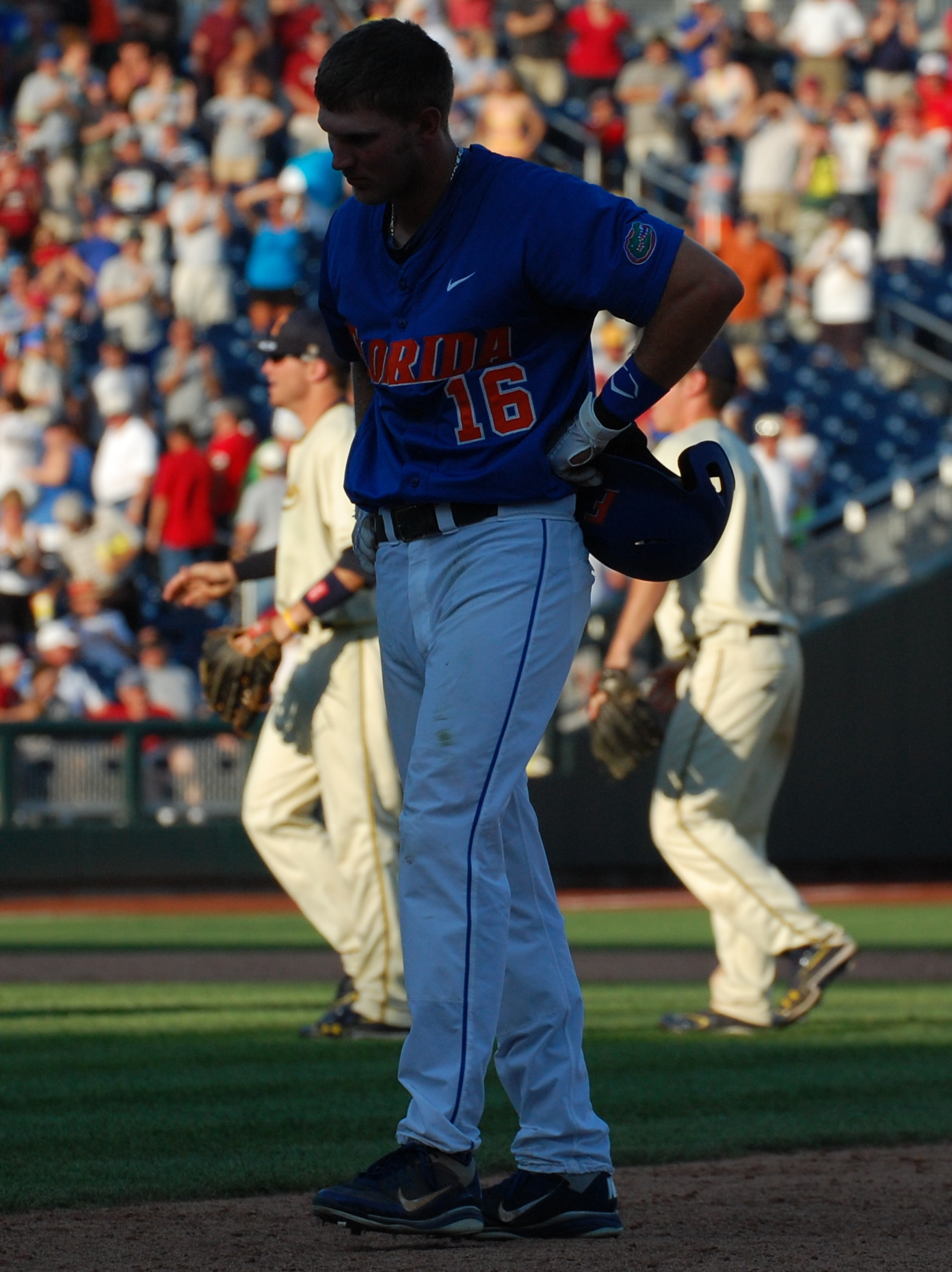
- Shafer at the 2012 College World Series

Kansas City Monarchs
- Pitcher / Coach
- Born: September 18, 1992 (age 34); Lake Wales, Florida, U.S.
- Batted: Right Threw: Right

MLB debut
- August 19, 2018, for the Toronto Blue Jays

Last MLB appearance
- August 17, 2020, for the Miami Marlins

MLB statistics
- Win–loss record: 2–1
- Earned run average: 4.70
- Strikeouts: 46
- Stats at Baseball Reference

Teams
- Toronto Blue Jays (2018–2019); Miami Marlins (2020)

Justin Healy Shafer (born September 18, 1992) is an American professional baseball coach and former pitcher who is currently the pitching coach for the Kansas City Monarchs of the American Association of Professional Baseball. He played in Major League Baseball (MLB) for the Toronto Blue Jays and Miami Marlins.

== High school and college ==
Shafer graduated from Lake Wales High School in his home town of Lake Wales, Florida. Undrafted out of high school, he then attended the University of Florida, where he was both a pitcher and a position player. In his freshman season, Shafer recorded a .284 batting average and 27 runs batted in (RBI), and a 4.50 earned run average (ERA) in six relief pitching appearances. As a sophomore, Shafer hit .300 with five home runs and 25 RBI, and posted a 1–1 win–loss record, 5.20 ERA, and 26 strikeouts in 27 2/3 innings. In his final season with the Gators, he hit .211 with one home run and 10 RBI, and went 1–0 on the mound with a 4.17 ERA and 27 strikeouts in 36 2/3 innings.

In 2012 and 2013, he played collegiate summer baseball in the Cape Cod Baseball League for the Yarmouth-Dennis Red Sox.

== Professional career ==
=== Toronto Blue Jays ===
Shafer was selected in the eighth round, with the 234th overall selection, of the 2014 Major League Baseball draft by the Toronto Blue Jays. He was assigned to the Low–A Vancouver Canadians for the remainder of the 2014 season, and went 1–3 with a 5.16 ERA and 23 strikeouts in 22 2/3 innings pitched. Shafer was assigned to the Single–A Lansing Lugnuts to begin 2015, and was later promoted to the High–A Dunedin Blue Jays. Operating as a swingman, Shafer posted an 8–9 record, 4.15 ERA, and 53 strikeouts in 95 1/3 innings. During the offseason, Shafer pitched for the Salt River Rafters of the Arizona Fall League (AFL). He spent the entire 2016 season with Dunedin, going 4–6 with a 5.23 ERA and 62 strikeouts in a career-high 115 1/3 innings. Shafer returned to the AFL in the offseason, appearing in seven games for the Mesa Solar Sox.

Shafer was converted to a full-time reliever to begin the 2017 campaign. After five scoreless appearances with Dunedin, he was promoted to the Double–A New Hampshire Fisher Cats. Shafer spent the majority of the year with New Hampshire, and earned a late-season promotion to the Triple-A Buffalo Bisons. In total, Shafer made 44 relief appearances in 2017 and went 5–2 with a 2.90 ERA and 65 strikeouts in 71 1/3 innings. On January 24, 2018, the Blue Jays invited Shafer to spring training. He split his time in 2018 between New Hampshire and Buffalo.

On August 19, 2018, Shafer was called up by the Blue Jays and made his debut the same day in relief against the New York Yankees, throwing a scoreless inning with a strikeout. He was outrighted off the roster on November 2, 2018, and assigned to Triple-A Buffalo to start the 2019 season. Shafer had his contract selected on May 28, 2019. He was optioned back to Buffalo on June 3. He ended the season with a record of 2–1 in 34 games. He struck out 39 in 39 2/3 innings but also walked 25 batters. Shafer was designated for assignment on November 20, 2019.

=== Cincinnati Reds ===
On November 25, 2019, Shafer was traded to the Cincinnati Reds in exchange for cash considerations. On July 24, 2020, Shafer was designated for assignment by the Reds organization.

=== Miami Marlins ===
On July 27, 2020, Shafer was claimed off waivers by the Miami Marlins. On September 9, 2020, Shafer was designated for assignment and released the same day by the Marlins. Shafer allowed no runs with 2 strikeouts in 1.0 inning pitched for the Marlins in 2020.

=== Kansas City Monarchs ===
On March 8, 2021, Shafer signed with the Kansas City Monarchs of the American Association of Professional Baseball. In 5 games for the Monarchs, Shafer recorded a 2–1 record and 5.59 ERA with 26 strikeouts in 19.1 innings pitched.

On June 18, 2021, Shafer's contract was purchased by the Chicago Cubs organization. However, Shafer did not play in a game for the Cubs organization and returned to the Monarchs on July 2.

After the 2021 season Shafer would become a free agent.

== Coaching career ==
On April 15, 2024, Shafer was hired to become the pitching coach for the Kansas City Monarchs of the American Association of Professional Baseball.
