= Guillermo Martínez (baseball) =

American baseball player & coach (born 1984)

Milwaukee Brewers – No. 91
- Hitting coach
- Born: October 5, 1984 (age 42); Managua, Nicaragua
- Bats: Right Throws: Right
- Stats at Baseball Reference

Teams
- Toronto Blue Jays (2019–2024); Milwaukee Brewers (2026–present)

Career highlights and awards
- World Series champion (2026)

Guillermo Enrique Martínez (born October 5, 1984) is a Nicaraguan professional baseball coach who currently serves as an assistant hitting coach for the Milwaukee Brewers of Major League Baseball (MLB). Prior to his coaching career, he spent several seasons as a shortstop in the Florida Marlins organization.

== Professional career ==
Martínez was selected in the 17th round of the 2003 Major League Baseball draft by the Chicago White Sox, but did not sign and then attended the University of South Alabama. In the 2006 draft, the Florida Marlins selected him in the 15th round. Martínez appeared in 36 games for the Low–A Jamestown Jammers in 2006, batting .193 with 11 runs batted in (RBI). In 2007, Martínez played for the Single–A Greensboro Grasshoppers and the High–A Jupiter Hammerheads, and hit a combined .260 with one home run and seven RBI in 48 games. Martínez played his final season with the Marlins organization in 2008, hitting .201 in 61 games for Jupiter.

In 2009, Martínez hit .304 with three home runs, 31 RBI, and 28 stolen bases for the Windy City ThunderBolts of the independent Frontier League. He split the 2010 season with the ThunderBolts and the Lake County Fielders of the Northern League, and played his final season of professional baseball with the American Association's Grand Prairie AirHogs in 2011.

== Coaching career ==
=== Toronto Blue Jays ===
In 2012, Martínez was hired by the Toronto Blue Jays as a minor league hitting and infield coach. On November 16, 2018, he was promoted to the position of hitting coach at the major league level, replacing Brook Jacoby.

Martínez was ejected prior to the Blue Jays game June 22, 2022 against the Chicago White Sox following a heated lineup card exchange that stemmed from an issue from the June 21 game. While exchanging lineup cards, Martínez confronted home plate umpire Doug Eddings about questionable calls made during the previous game. On June 24, MLB suspended Martínez five games for making contact with Eddings and "for his unsportsmanlike conduct during the pregame lineup card exchange." Martínez was also fined an undisclosed amount.

On September 30, 2024, Martínez and the Blue Jays parted ways.

=== Milwaukee Brewers ===
On January 5, 2026, the Milwaukee Brewers hired Martínez to serve as an assistant hitting coach alongside Daniel Vogelbach.
