= T. J. Zeuch =

American baseball player (born 1995)

Free agent
- Pitcher
- Born: August 1, 1995 (age 30); Mason, Ohio, U.S.
- Bats: Right Throws: Right

MLB debut
- September 3, 2019, for the Toronto Blue Jays

MLB statistics (through 2022 season)
- Win–loss record: 2–7
- Earned run average: 6.49
- Strikeouts: 36
- Stats at Baseball Reference

Teams
- Toronto Blue Jays (2019–2021); Cincinnati Reds (2022)

Timothy James Zeuch (/zɔɪk/ ZOYK; born August 1, 1995) is an American professional baseball pitcher who is a free agent. He has previously played in Major League Baseball (MLB) for the Toronto Blue Jays and Cincinnati Reds. He played college baseball for the Pittsburgh Panthers, and was selected by the Blue Jays in the first round of the 2016 MLB draft.

== Amateur career ==
Zeuch attended Mason High School in Mason, Ohio. He was drafted by the Kansas City Royals in the 31st round of the 2013 Major League Baseball draft, but did not sign and attended the University of Pittsburgh to play college baseball for the Panthers.

As a freshman at Pittsburgh in 2014, Zeuch appeared in 15 games and made nine starts. He pitched to a 2–6 win–loss record with a 2.75 earned run average (ERA) and 41 strikeouts. As a sophomore, he started 14 games, going 5–6 with a 3.87 ERA and 90 strikeouts. After the 2015 season, he played collegiate summer baseball with the Chatham Anglers of the Cape Cod Baseball League. Zeuch missed the first month of his junior year due to a strained groin. He finished the year with a 6–1 record, 3.10 ERA, and 74 strikeouts in 69 2/3 innings.

== Professional career ==
=== Toronto Blue Jays ===
==== Minor leagues ====
Zeuch was considered a top prospect heading into the 2016 draft, and was selected 21st overall by the Toronto Blue Jays. He signed with the Blue Jays on June 17 for $2.175 million, and was assigned to the Rookie-level Gulf Coast League Blue Jays. Zeuch made his professional debut on July 9, striking out two and not allowing a baserunner in three innings, before being promoted to the Low-A Vancouver Canadians of the Northwest League on July 13. On August 29, Zeuch was promoted to the Single-A Lansing Lugnuts. He finished the season with a combined 0–2 record, 4.50 ERA, and 38 strikeouts in 34 innings pitched. Zeuch was assigned to the High-A Dunedin Blue Jays for the 2017 season. He battled injuries that limited him to just 65 2/3 innings, and finished the season with a 3–6 record, 3.56 ERA, and 51 strikeouts.

Zeuch started the 2018 season in Dunedin, where he went 3–3 with a 3.47 ERA before being promoted to the Double-A New Hampshire Fisher Cats. On June 4 he pitched his first shutout.

In 2019 Zeuch went to spring training with the Major League Blue Jays, but in February he suffered a strained lat muscle and did not pitch for about 3 months. After several appearances with Dunedin in June, on June 22 he was promoted to the Triple-A Buffalo Bisons and was immediately inserted into the starting rotation. On August 19, Zeuch threw a no-hitter against the Rochester Red Wings, and in doing so became the first Bison to throw a no-hitter since Bartolo Colón in 1997.

==== Major leagues ====
The Blue Jays selected Zeuch's contract and promoted him to the major leagues on September 3, 2019. He made his debut that night in relief in the second inning of the Blue Jays' game against the Atlanta Braves. The first batter he faced was Tyler Flowers, who grounded out; later that inning he struck out Mike Foltynewicz for his first career strikeout. In all, Zeuch pitched four innings, allowing two runs on three hits and two walks with four strikeouts. Zeuch earned his first major league win on September 15, pitching 5 1/3 innings in relief, striking out five and allowing two earned runs in a 6–4 Blue Jays win over the New York Yankees. Zeuch's rookie season ended with a 1–2 record and a 4.76 ERA in five games pitched.

During spring training in 2020, Zeuch was optioned to Triple–A in Buffalo. Once the 2020 Major League regular season got underway in late July (due to the COVID-19 pandemic), Zeuch was assigned to the alternate training site in Rochester, New York. On September 17, Zeuch was called up to the majors. In his first relief appearance the next day, he pitched 3 innings, giving up 1 run against the New York Yankees. Three days later, again vs. the Yankees, Zeuch pitched 3 1/3 innings of one-run, one-hit, one-walk relief to record his second career win.

Zeuch was the starting pitcher in the Blue Jays' next-to-last game of the regular season and he pitched 5 scoreless innings against the Baltimore Orioles. He did not get a decision in the Blue Jays' 5-2 win. Zeuch finished the regular season with a 1-0 record and an ERA of 1.59 in 11.1 innings pitched, allowing 9 hits and 4 walks with 3 strikeouts.

On May 3, 2021, Zeuch was assigned to Triple-A Buffalo. On June 17, Zeuch was recalled from Buffalo to start against the New York Yankees. Zeuch struggled to an 0-2 record and 6.60 ERA in 5 games, 3 of them starts, before he was designated for assignment on July 20.

=== St. Louis Cardinals ===
On July 25, 2021, the Blue Jays traded Zeuch to the St. Louis Cardinals in exchange for cash considerations. He pitched the remainder of the season for the club’s Triple-A affiliate, the Memphis Redbirds.

He was assigned to Memphis to begin the 2022 season. Zeuch was designated for assignment on May 21, 2022, and was released on May 28.

=== Cincinnati Reds ===
Zeuch was signed to a minor league contract by the Cincinnati Reds on June 3, 2022. He was called up to the Reds on August 10 to start a game that day against the New York Mets in New York. He made two starts, giving up 6 runs in 4 innings in each start, before being optioned to the Triple-A Louisville Bats on August 21. On September 14, Zeuch was released by the Reds.

=== Philadelphia Phillies ===
On December 15, 2022, Zeuch signed a minor league contract with the Colorado Rockies organization.

On March 28, 2023, Zeuch was traded to the Philadelphia Phillies and assigned to the Triple-A Lehigh Valley IronPigs. In 16 games (15 starts) for Lehigh Valley, he logged a 4–5 record and 5.06 ERA with 42 strikeouts in 74 2/3 innings pitched. On September 9, Zeuch was released by the Phillies organization.

=== Washington Nationals ===
On February 15, 2024, Zeuch signed a minor league contract with the Washington Nationals. In 11 games for the Triple–A Rochester Red Wings, he struggled to an 11.69 ERA with 12 strikeouts across 22 1/3 innings pitched. On June 14, Zeuch was released by the Nationals organization.

=== Olmecas de Tabasco ===
On June 30, 2024, Zeuch signed with the Olmecas de Tabasco of the Mexican League. He made one start for Tabasco, tossing four innings and striking out four batters while allowing two hits.

=== Piratas de Campeche ===
On December 11, 2024, Zeuch was traded to the Piratas de Campeche in exchange for Ariel Miranda. He made one start for Campeche, taking the loss after allowing seven runs (six earned) on eight hits with two strikeouts in 3 2/3 innings. Zeuch was released by the Piratas on April 25, 2025.

== Personal life ==
Zeuch is the son of Tim and Lisa Zeuch. His father played in the Kansas City Royals organization, pitching in two games in 1980.

On November 17, 2018, Zeuch married Lindsay Wilson in Pittsburgh.
