= Sean Reid-Foley =

American baseball player (born 1995)

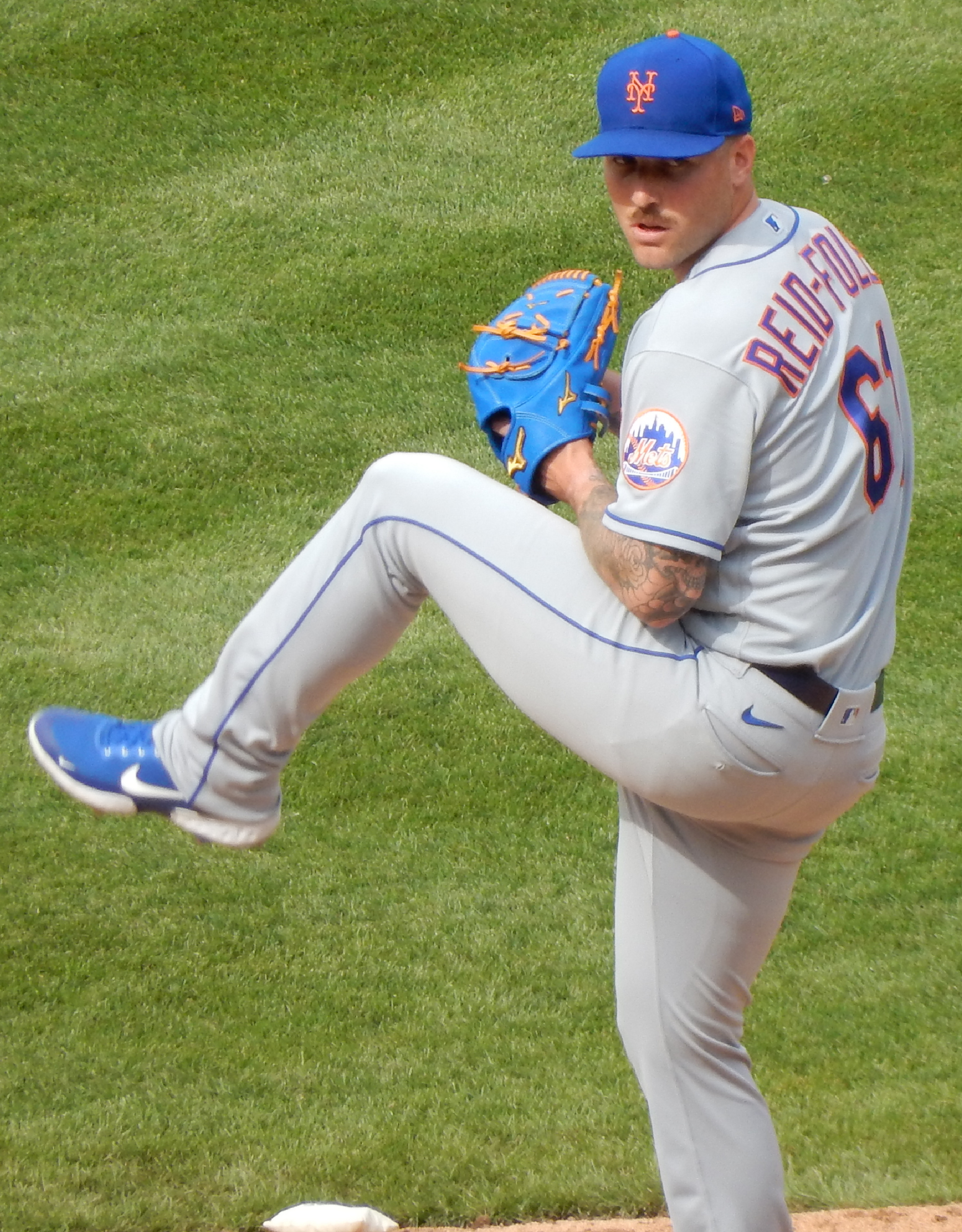
- Reid-Foley with the New York Mets in 2022

Free agent
- Pitcher
- Born: August 30, 1995 (age 31); Agana Heights, Guam
- Bats: Right Throws: Right

MLB debut
- August 13, 2018, for the Toronto Blue Jays

MLB statistics (through 2024 season)
- Win–loss record: 8–12
- Earned run average: 4.10
- Strikeouts: 151
- Stats at Baseball Reference

Teams
- Toronto Blue Jays (2018–2020); New York Mets (2021–2024)

Sean Ian Reid-Foley (born August 30, 1995) is an American professional baseball pitcher who is a free agent. He has previously played in Major League Baseball (MLB) for the Toronto Blue Jays and New York Mets. He made his MLB debut in 2018.

== Early life ==
Reid-Foley was born in Guam while his father, Dave Foley, was assigned there while serving in the United States Coast Guard.

Reid-Foley attended Sandalwood High School in Jacksonville, Florida. As a junior in 2013, he threw a no-hitter with 16 strikeouts in a game against Flagler Palm Coast High School.

== Professional career ==
=== Toronto Blue Jays ===
==== Minor leagues ====
Considered by MLB.com to be the 18th overall prospect heading into the 2014 Major League Baseball draft, he was drafted by the Toronto Blue Jays in the second round, 49th overall. Having signed a commitment to Florida State University, he was passed over in the first round due to signability concerns. On June 10, 2014, he signed with the Blue Jays for a bonus of $1.128 million, and was expected to join extended spring training in Clearwater. Reid-Foley made his professional debut for the rookie-level Gulf Coast League Blue Jays on June 27, pitching 2/3 of an inning and yielding two earned runs. He finished the 2014 regular season with a 1–2 record in nine appearances (six starts), a 4.76 ERA, and 25 strikeouts in 22 2/3 innings. Reid-Foley was promoted to the Low-A Vancouver Canadians on September 3, 2014, but did not make an appearance during the Northwest League playoffs.

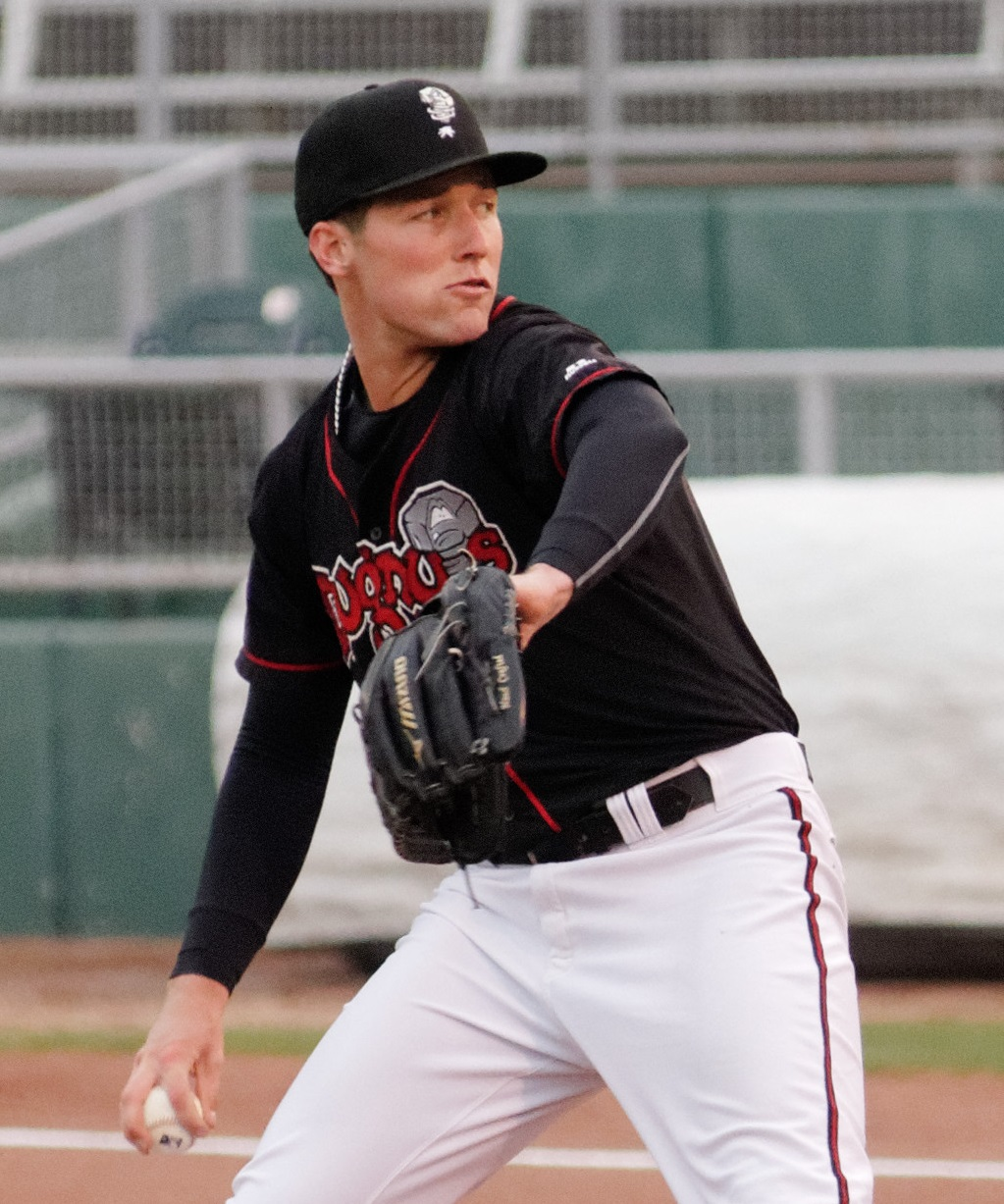
Reid-Foley with the Lansing Lugnuts in 2016

Reid-Foley began the 2015 season with the Single-A Lansing Lugnuts and made his debut for the team on April 14, 2015. He started the game, pitching three shutout innings and yielding only two hits and two walks while striking out six. He set career highs in innings pitched (5 2/3) and strikeouts (10) in a start on May 30 against the Dayton Dragons. His performance earned him a spot on MLB Pipeline's Prospect Team of the Week. In late June, Reid-Foley was promoted to the High-A Dunedin Blue Jays. He made his debut on July 5, pitching five shutout innings against the Lakeland Flying Tigers. Reid-Foley ended the 2015 season with a 4–10 win–loss record, 4.22 ERA, and 125 strikeouts in 96 innings pitched. He was assigned to the Lansing Lugnuts to open the 2016 minor league season. After pitching to a 2.95 ERA through 58 innings, Reid-Foley was promoted back to Dunedin on June 16 to start that night against the Clearwater Threshers. He struck out 12 batters, a new career-high, in a 4–0 win. On July 27, Reid-Foley was ranked 93rd on MLB's Top 100 Prospects list. He finished the 2016 season with a combined 10–5 record, 2.81 ERA, and 130 strikeouts in 115 1/3 innings. Reid-Foley greatly improved his control in 2016, lowering his walks per nine innings from 6.3 in 2015 to 3.0.

Reid-Foley started the 2017 season playing with the Double-A New Hampshire Fisher Cats. He made 27 starts and posted a 10–11 record, 5.09 ERA, and 122 strikeouts in a career-high 132 2/3 innings pitched. On January 24, 2018, the Blue Jays invited Reid-Foley to spring training. He began 2018 with New Hampshire. After posting a 5–0 record with a 2.03 ERA in eight starts for the Fisher Cats, Reid-Foley was promoted to the Triple-A Buffalo Bisons on May 24.

==== Major leagues ====
Reid-Foley was called up on August 13, 2018, and made his major league debut the same day against the Kansas City Royals. He took the loss in the game, yielding three runs on six hits and three walks, while striking out three. He and Danny Jansen became the first batterymates to debut in the same American League game since Billy Rohr and Russ Gibson in April 1967. Reid-Foley earned his first major league win on September 2, when he pitched seven innings of one-run baseball and struck out ten batters as the Blue Jays beat the Miami Marlins 6–1. On September 15, Reid-Foley became the first pitcher in franchise history to record 31 strikeouts through his first five major league starts and the second to record two double-digit-strikeout games as a rookie. Reid-Foley finished with 7 starts for the Blue Jays, with a recording 2–4 in 33 1/3 innings, striking out 42 but walking 21. The following season, he was 2–4 in 9 games (6 starts) in 31 2/3 innings.

In 2020, Reid-Foley had five relief appearances, and compiled a 1–0 record, 1.35 ERA, and 6 strikeouts in 6 2/3 innings pitched.

=== New York Mets ===
On January 27, 2021, Reid-Foley was traded to the New York Mets with right handed pitchers Yennsy Díaz and Josh Winckowski for starter Steven Matz. Reid-Foley made his first appearance for the Mets on April 22, in relief against the Chicago Cubs. He pitched three perfect innings and recorded four strikeouts. After the game, he was sent back down to the Mets' alternate site. He was recalled on May 11 after Jacob deGrom was placed on the injured list. After relieving starter Taijuan Walker in a game on May 17 against the Atlanta Braves, Reid-Foley struck out five batters in three perfect innings and earned his first win of the season. He also got on base for the first time in his career, drawing a walk in the fifth inning. On May 31, he was demoted to the Triple-A Syracuse Mets to create room on the active roster for Seth Lugo.

On May 1, 2022, Reid-Foley was placed on the injured list with a partially torn ulnar collateral ligament in his right elbow. On May 11, Reid-Foley underwent Tommy John surgery, ending his 2022 season. On November 18, Reid-Foley was non-tendered and became a free agent.

On December 6, 2022, he re-signed with the Mets on a minor league contract. In 22 combined appearances split between Triple-A Syracuse, the High-A Brooklyn Cyclones, and the Single-A St. Lucie Mets, he posted a cumulative 4.09 ERA with 33 strikeouts in 22 innings of work. On August 23, 2023, the Mets added Reid-Foley to their roster. In 8 games, he posted a 3.52 ERA with 16 strikeouts over 7 2/3 innings pitched.

On June 22, 2024, Reid-Foley was placed on the injured list with right shoulder impingement and was transferred to the 60-day injured list on September 5, ending his season. He made 23 appearances for the Mets in 2024, compiling a 1.66 ERA with 25 strikeouts over 21 2/3 innings of work.

On March 6, 2025, the Mets placed Reid-Foley on outright waivers; he later cleared waivers and was sent outright to Triple-A Syracuse after being removed from the 40-man roster. In 15 appearances for Syracuse, he struggled to a 1–2 record and an 8.36 ERA with 24 strikeouts over 14 innings of work. On May 23, Reid-Foley was released by the Mets organization.

=== Arizona Diamondbacks ===
On May 29, 2025, Reid-Foley signed a minor league contract with the Arizona Diamondbacks. In 16 appearances for the Triple-A Reno Aces, he posted an 0–1 record with 1 save, a 5.79 ERA, and 15 strikeouts over 14 innings of work. Reid-Foley was released by the Diamondbacks organization on July 23.

=== Charros de Jalisco ===
On January 14, 2026, Reid-Foley signed a minor league contract with the Atlanta Braves. On March 25, Reid-Foley was released by Atlanta prior to the start of the regular season.

On May 1, 2026, Reid-Foley signed with the Charros de Jalisco of the Mexican League. In three appearances (two starts) for the team, he struggled to a 15.43 ERA, allowing six hits and four earned runs across 2 1/3 innings of work. On May 27, Reid-Foley was released by Jalisco.

== Personal life ==
His elder brother, David, was a catcher at Mercer University and signed with the Los Angeles Dodgers as an undrafted free agent in 2013. The Dodgers organization converted him into a pitcher in 2014.
