= Thomas Pannone =

American baseball player (born 1994)

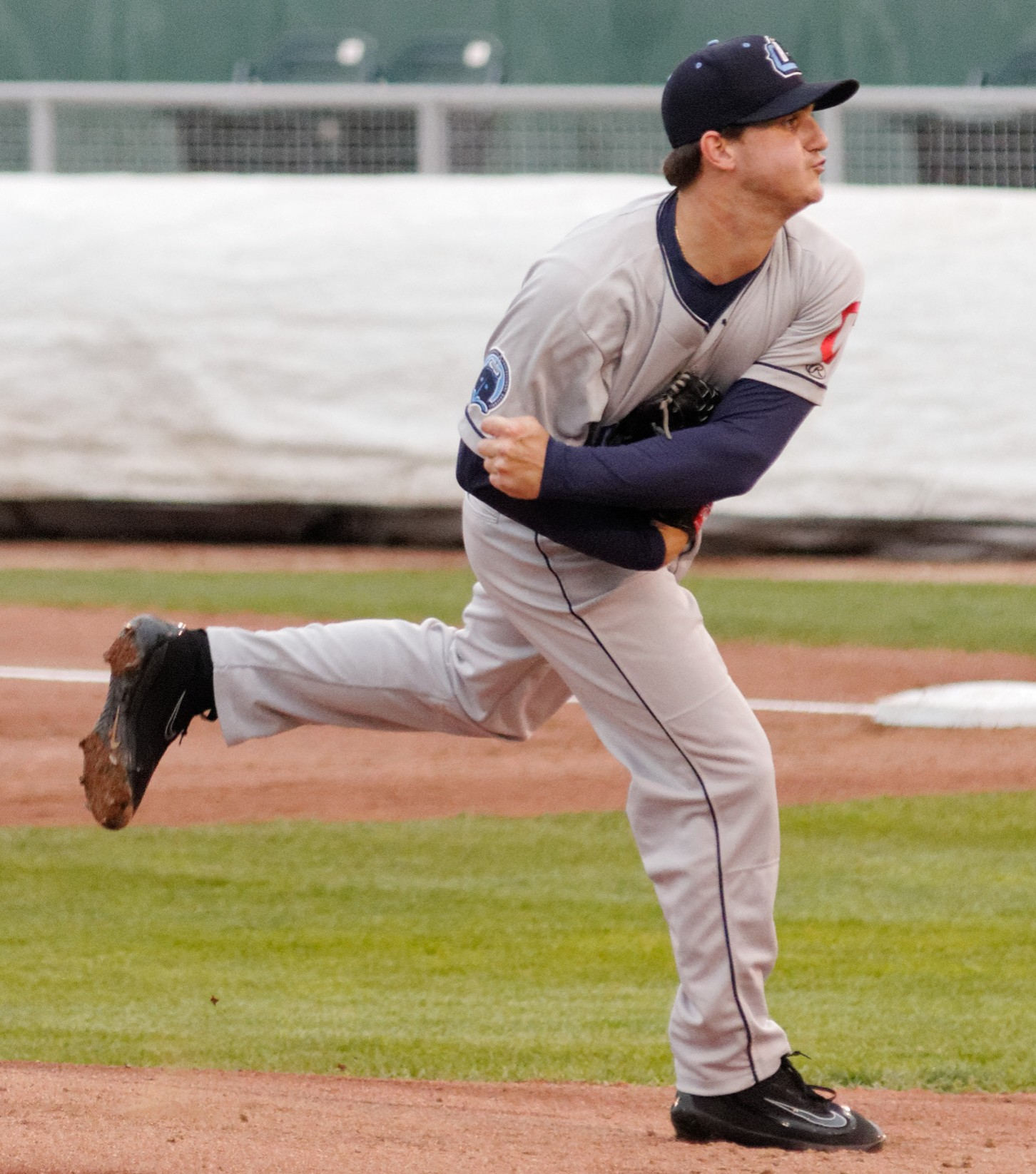
- Pannone with the Lake County Captains in 2016

Free agent
- Pitcher
- Born: April 28, 1994 (age 32); Cranston, Rhode Island, U.S.
- Bats: Left Throws: Left

Professional debut
- MLB: August 10, 2018, for the Toronto Blue Jays
- KBO: July 14, 2022, for the Kia Tigers

MLB statistics (through 2026 season)
- Win–loss record: 7–8
- Earned run average: 5.47
- Strikeouts: 104

KBO statistics (through 2023 season)
- Win–loss record: 9–7
- Earned run average: 3.49
- Strikeouts: 139
- Stats at Baseball Reference

Teams
- Toronto Blue Jays (2018–2019); Kia Tigers (2022); Milwaukee Brewers (2023); Kia Tigers (2023); Milwaukee Brewers (2026)

Thomas Edward Pannone (/pɑːˈnoʊn/ pah-NOHN; born April 28, 1994) is an American professional baseball pitcher who is a free agent. He has previously played in Major League Baseball (MLB) for the Toronto Blue Jays and Milwaukee Brewers, and in the KBO League for the Kia Tigers.

== High school and college ==
Pannone attended Bishop Hendricken High School in Warwick, Rhode Island, where he was an outfielder as well as a pitcher. He was drafted by the Chicago Cubs in the 33rd round of the 2012 Major League Baseball draft but did not sign and attended the College of Southern Nevada. Pannone stopped playing outfield in college, focusing solely on pitching. In his lone season of college baseball, he posted a 6–2 win–loss record, 1.84 earned run average (ERA), and 78 strikeouts in 53 2/3 innings pitched.

== Professional career ==
=== Cleveland Indians ===
The Cleveland Indians selected Pannone in the ninth round of the 2013 Major League Baseball draft. He made his professional debut with the Rookie-level Arizona League Indians. He made 14 relief appearances in 2013 and pitched to a 1–0 record, 9.00 ERA, and 20 strikeouts in 16 innings. He remained in the Arizona League for the 2014 season, going 5–0 with a 3.20 ERA and 62 strikeouts in 45 innings, and was named a post-season All-Star by the league. Pannone made his full-season debut in 2015, pitching the entire season with the Single-A Lake County Captains. In 116 1/3 total innings over 27 appearances, he posted a 7–6 record, 4.02 ERA, and 120 strikeouts. Pannone began the 2016 season with Lake County, where he was named a mid-season All-Star, before being promoted to the High-A Lynchburg Hillcats in July. In total, he made 25 appearances in the 2016 season and went 8–5 with a 2.57 ERA and 122 strikeouts in 133 innings.

Pannone was assigned to High-A Lynchburg to open the 2017 season. In early May, he was promoted to the Double-A Akron RubberDucks and was named an Eastern League All-Star at mid-season.

=== Toronto Blue Jays ===
On July 31, 2017, Cleveland traded Pannone and Samad Taylor to the Toronto Blue Jays for reliever Joe Smith. Pannone played the rest of 2017 for the Double-A New Hampshire Fisher Cats. On the year, Pannone posted a 9–3 record, 2.36 ERA, and 149 strikeouts in 144 2/3 innings. On November 20, 2017, Pannone was added to Toronto's 40-man roster.

On March 16, 2018, Pannone was suspended for 80 games after testing positive for dehydrochlormethyltestosterone, a banned performance-enhancing substance. After returning from suspension, he was assigned to the Triple-A Buffalo Bisons. On August 9, Pannone was called up by the Blue Jays. He made his first MLB start on August 22 and took a no-hitter into the seventh inning against the Baltimore Orioles. Pannone recorded the win, allowing just one hit and two walks with three strikeouts in seven innings. Pannone totaled 12 appearances for the Blue Jays, 6 of them starts, recording a record of 4–1 in 43 innings.

Pannone opened the 2019 season with the Blue Jays as a member of the bullpen. On April 14, Pannone pitched an immaculate inning against the Tampa Bay Rays, striking out Avisail Garcia, Brandon Lowe, and Daniel Robertson on 9 consecutive strikes. It is the third immaculate inning in Blue Jays team history; Steve Delabar and Roger Clemens are the other two who have managed the feat.

On August 24, 2020, without having made an appearance on the season, Pannone was designated for assignment following the promotion of Travis Bergen. He became a free agent on November 2.

=== Los Angeles Angels ===
On November 24, 2020, Pannone signed a minor league contract with the Los Angeles Angels organization. Pannone spent the 2021 season with the Triple-A Salt Lake Bees, but struggled to a 5–11 record and 7.07 ERA in 24 games (21 of them starts). He elected free agency following the season on November 7, 2021.

=== Boston Red Sox ===
On March 11, 2022, Pannone signed a minor league contract with the Boston Red Sox. In 14 games (12 starts) for the Triple-A Worcester Red Sox, he went 5–3 with a 4.57 ERA and 70 strikeouts in 63 innings of work. On June 27, Pannone was released by the Red Sox organization.

=== Kia Tigers ===
On June 28, 2022, Pannone signed with the Kia Tigers of the KBO League. In 14 starts down the stretch for the Tigers, Pannone worked to a 3–4 record and 2.72 ERA with 73 strikeouts in 82 2/3 innings pitched.

=== Milwaukee Brewers ===
On December 16, 2022, Pannone signed a minor league contract with the Milwaukee Brewers organization. He began the 2023 season with the Triple-A Nashville Sounds, where he made 11 appearances (9 starts) and registered a 2.70 ERA with 50 strikeouts in 53 1/3 innings pitched. On June 28, 2023, Pannone had his contract selected to the major league roster. He tossed 2 2/3 innings against the Pittsburgh Pirates in his only appearance, allowing 2 runs on 5 hits with 4 strikeouts. On June 30, Pannone was designated for assignment by Milwaukee. Pannone cleared waivers and was released by the Brewers on July 5.

=== Kia Tigers (second stint) ===
On July 6, 2023, Pannone signed a $350,000 contract to return to the Kia Tigers of the KBO League. He became a free agent following the season.

=== Chicago Cubs ===
On December 18, 2023, Pannone signed a minor league contract with the Chicago Cubs. In 19 starts for the Triple-A Iowa Cubs, he had a 4–8 record and 4.37 ERA with 87 strikeouts across 90 2/3 innings pitched. The Cubs released him on July 17, 2024.

=== New York Yankees ===
On July 19, 2024, Pannone signed a minor league contract with the New York Yankees organization. In 11 starts for the Triple-A Scranton/Wilkes-Barre RailRiders, he had a 6–1 record and 2.34 ERA with 49 strikeouts across 61 2/3 innings pitched. Pannone elected free agency following the season on November 4.

=== Milwaukee Brewers (second stint) ===
On November 25, 2024, Pannone signed a minor league contract with the Milwaukee Brewers. On March 9, 2025, Pannone was shut down after suffering a torn flexor tendon during a spring training outing. On June 26, he was transferred to the full-season injured list, ending his season without making an appearance.

The Brewers promoted Pannone to the major leagues on July 29, 2026. Starting for Milwaukee that day against the San Francisco Giants, he allowed three runs (two earned) across three innings of work, taking the loss. Pannone was designated for assignment by the Brewers on July 31. He cleared waivers and was sent outright to the Triple–A Nashville Sounds on August 6. On September 7, Pannone pitched a perfect game against the Durham Bulls at Durham Bulls Athletic Park in Durham, North Carolina. He threw 94 pitches and struck out eight batters on the way to accomplishing the fifth nine-inning complete perfect game in International League history. On October 29, Pannone elected free agency.
