= Buddy Boshers =

American baseball player (born 1988)

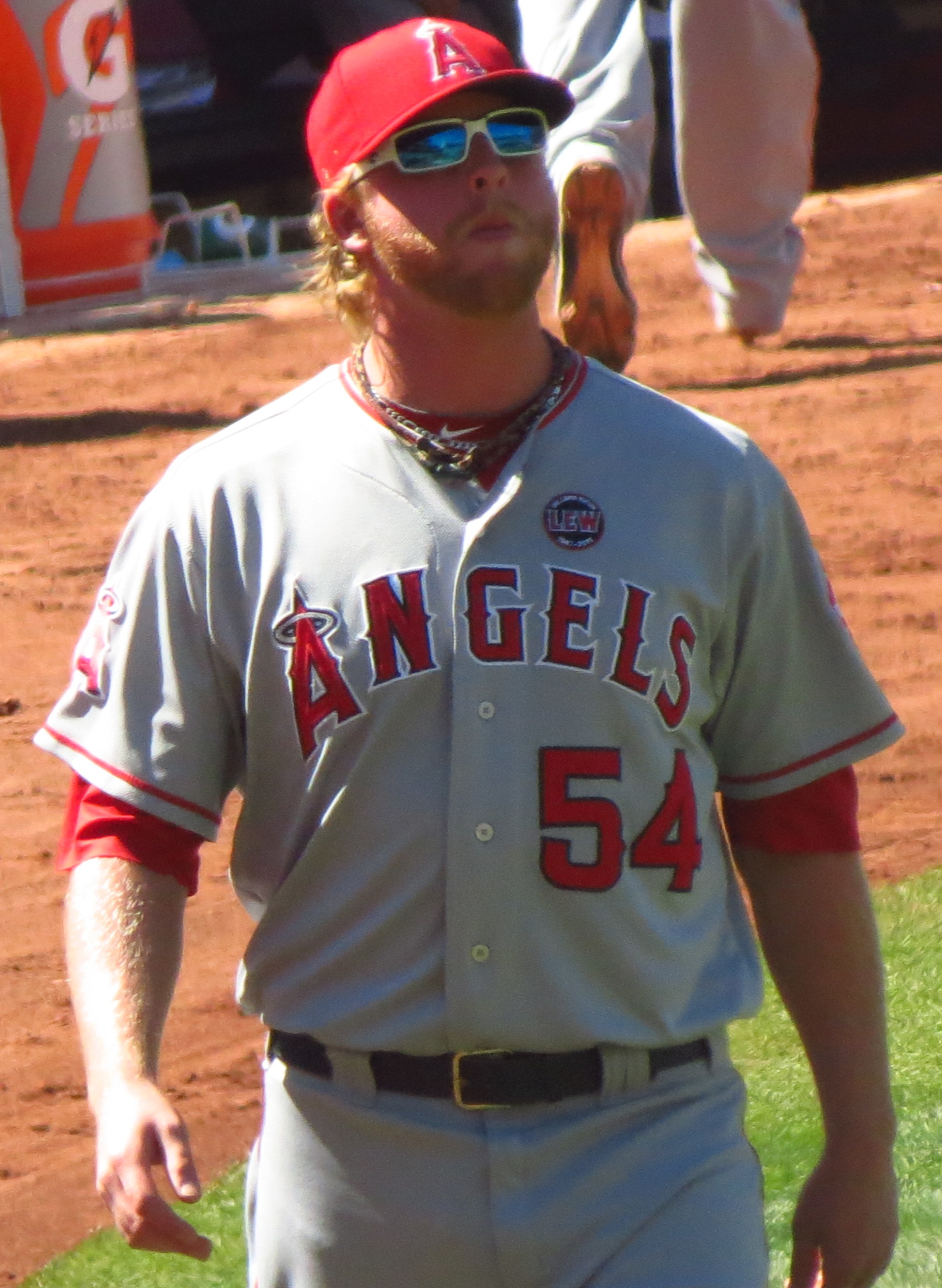
- Boshers in 2013
- Pitcher
- Born: May 9, 1988 (age 37); Huntsville, Alabama, U.S.
- Batted: Left Threw: Left

MLB debut
- August 10, 2013, for the Los Angeles Angels of Anaheim

Last MLB appearance
- September 28, 2019, for the Toronto Blue Jays

MLB statistics
- Win–loss record: 3–3
- Earned run average: 4.49
- Strikeouts: 104
- Stats at Baseball Reference

Teams
- Los Angeles Angels of Anaheim (2013); Minnesota Twins (2016–2017); Toronto Blue Jays (2019)

Jeffrey Alan "Buddy" Boshers (born May 9, 1988) is an American former professional baseball pitcher. He played in Major League Baseball (MLB) for the Los Angeles Angels, Minnesota Twins, and Toronto Blue Jays.

== Early life ==
A native of Huntsville, Alabama, Boshers is a graduate of Lee High School in Alabama. Boshers was a high school teammate of fellow MLB pitcher Craig Kimbrel. He attended Calhoun Community College.

== Career ==
=== Los Angeles Angels ===
Boshers was drafted by the Los Angeles Angels of Anaheim in the fourth round of the 2008 Major League Baseball draft. He made his professional debut with the rookie-level Orem Owlz, tossing 13 games of 2.68 ERA ball. Boshers split the 2009 season between three different Angels affiliates; Orem, the Single-A Cedar Rapids Kernels, and the Triple-A Salt Lake Bees. Between the three clubs, he posted a 5–2 record and 4.37 ERA in 13 appearances. In 2010, Boshers returned to Cedar Rapids and posted a 4.31 ERA in 36 appearances. The following season he spent the year with the High-A Inland Empire 66ers, logging a 4.30 ERA with 61 strikeouts in 43 contests. Boshers split the 2012 season between Inland Empire and the Double-A Arkansas Travelers, accumulating a 2.98 ERA with 75 strikeouts in 63.1 innings of work across 45 games. After beginning the 2013 season with Arkansas, he received a promotion to Triple-A Salt Lake in June.

Boshers was called up to the majors for the first time on August 10, 2013. He finished his rookie campaign with a 4.70 ERA in 25 major league appearances. He was optioned to Salt Lake to begin the 2014 season. Boshers was designated for assignment by the Angels on May 8, 2014, following the waiver claim of Brooks Raley. He was outrighted on May 12 and spent the entire year with Arkansas and Salt Lake, logging a 3.28 ERA in 40 total appearances.

=== Somerset Patriots ===
On December 5, 2014, Boshers signed a minor league deal with the Colorado Rockies and was invited to spring training, but was released on March 18, 2015.

On April 2, 2015, Boshers signed with the Somerset Patriots of the independent Atlantic League of Professional Baseball. In 52 games for Somerset, Boshers posted a stellar 1.00 ERA with 71 strikeouts in 54.0 innings pitched. He became a free agent following the season.

=== Minnesota Twins ===
On December 14, 2015, Boshers signed a minor league contract with the Minnesota Twins organization. He was assigned to the Triple-A Rochester Red Wings to begin the year, and was called up to the Majors on May 25, 2016. Boshers made 37 appearances for the Twins, going 2–0 with a 4.25 ERA in 36.0 innings of work. In 2017, he began the season pitching for Rochester in the International League. He would appear in 38 games for Minnesota in 2017, recording a 4.89 ERA with 28 strikeouts in 35.0 innings pitched for the team. The Twins designated him for assignment on January 15, 2018.

=== Houston Astros ===
Boshers was claimed off waivers by the Houston Astros on January 22, 2018. Boshers started the 2018 season with the Astros' Triple-A affiliate, the Fresno Grizzlies, where he had a 3.18 ERA across 41 relief appearances.

=== Pittsburgh Pirates ===
On August 7, 2018, Boshers was claimed off waivers by the Pittsburgh Pirates. Boshers was designated for assignment by Pittsburgh on September 4, and outrighted to Triple-A on September 9. He did not see time in a major league game for Pittsburgh, instead finishing the year with the Triple-A Indianapolis Indians, where he worked to a 4.50 ERA in 7 games. He elected free agency on October 2, 2018.

=== Pericos de Puebla ===
On January 14, 2019, Boshers signed a minor league contract with an invitation to spring training with the Cincinnati Reds. He was released prior to the start of the season on March 28.

On May 14, 2019, Boshers signed with the Pericos de Puebla of the Mexican League. Boshers made 2 scoreless appearances for Puebla, striking out 4 in 2 1/3 innings pitched.

=== Toronto Blue Jays ===
On May 19, 2019, Boshers signed a minor league contract with the Toronto Blue Jays organization and was assigned to the Triple-A Buffalo Bisons. On July 31, the Blue Jays selected Boshers' contract. In 28 appearances for Toronto, Boshers logged a 4.05 ERA with 26 strikeouts in 20 innings pitched. Boshers was outrighted off the Blue Jays roster on October 30, and elected free agency on November 1.
