= Elvis Luciano =

Dominican baseball player (born 2000)

Yomiuri Giants – No. 48
- Pitcher
- Born: February 15, 2000 (age 26); Boca Chica, Dominican Republic
- Bats: Right Throws: Right

Professional debut
- MLB: March 31, 2019, for the Toronto Blue Jays
- NPB: March 27, 2026, for the Yomiuri Giants

MLB statistics (through 2019 season)
- Win–loss record: 1–0
- Earned run average: 5.35
- Strikeouts: 27

NPB statistics (through August 18, 2026)
- Win–loss record: 0–1
- Earned run average: 5.25
- Strikeouts: 10
- Stats at Baseball Reference

Teams
- Toronto Blue Jays (2019); Yomiuri Giants (2026–present)

Elvis Enmanuel Luciano (born February 15, 2000) is a Dominican professional baseball pitcher for the Yomiuri Giants of Nippon Professional Baseball (NPB). He made his Major League Baseball (MLB) debut with the Toronto Blue Jays, and was the first player born in the 2000s to appear in an MLB game and record a win.

== Professional career ==
=== Arizona Diamondbacks ===
Luciano was signed as an international free agent on October 1, 2016, by the Arizona Diamondbacks. He split this debut season of 2017 between the Rookie-level Dominican Summer League Diamondbacks and AZL Diamondbacks, and the Rookie Advanced Missoula Osprey. He posted a combined 4–1 record with a 2.84 ERA in 66 2/3 innings over 16 games (8 starts). Luciano opened the 2018 season in extended spring training.

=== Kansas City Royals ===
On June 6, 2018, the Arizona Diamondbacks traded Luciano and Gabe Speier to the Kansas City Royals for Jon Jay. He played for the Rookie Advanced Idaho Falls Chukars and Burlington Royals in 2018, combining to go 10–10 with a 3.90 ERA in 134 innings over 26 games (24 starts).

=== Toronto Blue Jays ===
The Blue Jays selected Luciano from the Royals organization in the 2018 Rule 5 draft. He was eligible because his first professional contract had been voided due to a medical issue. Luciano made the Blue Jays' 2019 Opening Day roster, becoming the first active major league player born in the 2000s. On March 31, Luciano made his major league debut at 19 years and 44 days old, throwing 1 1/3 scoreless innings against the Detroit Tigers. In doing so he became the youngest pitcher to appear in a game for the Blue Jays, as well as the youngest player to appear in a game during the 2019 MLB season.

On April 28, 2019, Luciano earned his first major league win after recording the final out of the top of the 11th inning before the Blue Jays walked off the Oakland Athletics 5–4. On June 12, 2019, Luciano went on the 10-day injured list due to a right elbow sprain. On June 17, he was transferred to the 60-day injured list. He was activated from the injured list on September 12. Luciano did not make an appearance for the Blue Jays in 2020.

Luciano made 11 starts for the Double-A New Hampshire Fisher Cats, going 0–1 with a 3.41 ERA and 33 strikeouts. On August 23, 2021, Luciano was released by the Blue Jays, and re-signed to a new minor league contract on August 30.

In 2022, Luciano pitched only three innings over two starts for the Fisher Cats before being shut down for the rest of the season due to a stress fracture in his pitching arm. He elected free agency following the season on November 10, 2022.

=== Yomiuri Giants ===
On January 24, 2023, Luciano signed with the Yomiuri Giants of Nippon Professional Baseball (NPB). He did not pitch at all in 2023, and played sparingly with the Giants developmental league team in 2024 and 2025, pitching 10 innings in 2024, and 3 in 2025.

In 2026, Luciano made Yomiuri's NPB roster.

== See also ==
- Rule 5 draft results
