= 2019 Baltimore Orioles season =

Major League Baseball season

2019 Baltimore Orioles
- League: American League
- Division: East
- Ballpark: Oriole Park at Camden Yards
- City: Baltimore, Maryland
- Record: 54–108 (.333)
- Divisional place: 5th
- Owners: Peter Angelos
- General managers: Mike Elias
- Managers: Brandon Hyde
- Television: MASN (Gary Thorne, Jim Palmer, Mike Bordick, Jim Hunter)
- Radio: WJZ-FM; Baltimore Orioles Radio Network (Jim Hunter, Ben McDonald, Mike Bordick, Kevin Brown)

The 2019 Baltimore Orioles season was the 119th season in Baltimore Orioles franchise history, 66th in Baltimore, and the 28th at Oriole Park at Camden Yards. The Orioles were managed by Brandon Hyde in his first season as Orioles manager. They finished 54–108, 7 games better than their disastrous 47–115 record from their 2018 season, but they missed the playoffs for a third straight season, as they were mathematically eliminated from playoff contention on August 23.

The season set several statistical records and quirks. The Orioles finished last in the AL East for a third consecutive season. The Orioles set a franchise record of a combined 101–223 over the previous two seasons, the worst two-season span in franchise history. The 2019 Orioles became the first team in history to yield 300+ home runs in a season, a new MLB record. The pitching staff also allowed 981 runs throughout the season - an abysmal mark that led all of MLB and was the worst in MLB history since the 1999 Colorado Rockies allowed 1028 runs. They were also the first team since the 1979 Blue Jays to lose 107 or more games and not earn the first overall pick in the subsequent year's draft, as the Detroit Tigers finished 47–114, 6 1/2 games worse than Baltimore.

Despite the team's atrocious overall performance, one highlight of the 2019 season was back-to-back 13–0 victories over the Cleveland Indians on June 28–29. The Orioles were the first team in major league history to record back-to-back shutout victories by a margin of 13 or more runs. Another highlight was the Orioles hitting multiple home runs in each of 10 consecutive games between July 17 and July 27, the most in MLB since 1901.

== Regular season ==
=== American League East ===
AL East
Team	W	L	Pct.	GB	Home	Road
New York Yankees	103	59	.636	—	57‍–‍24	46‍–‍35
Tampa Bay Rays	96	66	.593	7	48‍–‍33	48‍–‍33
Boston Red Sox	84	78	.519	19	38‍–‍43	46‍–‍35
Toronto Blue Jays	67	95	.414	36	35‍–‍46	32‍–‍49
Baltimore Orioles	54	108	.333	49	25‍–‍56	29‍–‍52

=== American League Wild Card ===
Division leaders
Team	W	L	Pct.
Houston Astros	107	55	.660
New York Yankees	103	59	.636
Minnesota Twins	101	61	.623

Wild Card teams (Top 2 teams qualify for postseason)
Team	W	L	Pct.	GB
Oakland Athletics	97	65	.599	+1
Tampa Bay Rays	96	66	.593	—
Cleveland Indians	93	69	.574	3
Boston Red Sox	84	78	.519	12
Texas Rangers	78	84	.481	18
Chicago White Sox	72	89	.447	23½
Los Angeles Angels	72	90	.444	24
Seattle Mariners	68	94	.420	28
Toronto Blue Jays	67	95	.414	29
Kansas City Royals	59	103	.364	37
Baltimore Orioles	54	108	.333	42
Detroit Tigers	47	114	.292	48½

=== Record vs. opponents ===
2019 American League record Source: MLB Standings Grid – 2019
Team	BAL	BOS	CWS	CLE	DET	HOU	KC	LAA	MIN	NYY	OAK	SEA	TB	TEX	TOR	NL
Baltimore	—	7–12	3–3	3–4	3–4	2–4	3–3	4–3	0–6	2–17	1–6	3–4	7–12	1–6	8–11	7–13
Boston	12–7	—	5–2	3–3	5–2	2–4	5–1	4–3	3–3	5–14	4–3	4–3	7–12	4–3	11–8	10–10
Chicago	3–3	2–5	—	11–8	12–6	4–3	9–10	2–5	6–13	4–3	1–5	2–4	2–4	4–3	4–3	6–14
Cleveland	4–3	3–3	8–11	—	18–1	3–4	12–7	6–0	10–9	4–3	1–5	5–1	1–6	4–3	6–1	8–12
Detroit	4–3	2–5	6–12	1–18	—	1–6	10–9	3–3	5–14	3–3	1–6	1–6	2–4	0–6	3–4	5–15
Houston	4–2	4–2	3–4	4–3	6–1	—	5–1	14–5	3–4	4–3	11–8	18–1	3–4	13–6	4–2	11–9
Kansas City	3–3	1–5	10–9	7–12	9–10	1–5	—	2–4	5–14	2–5	2–5	2–5	3–4	2–5	1–6	9–11
Los Angeles	3–4	3–4	5–2	0–6	3–3	5–14	4–2	—	1–5	2–5	6–13	10–9	3–4	9–10	6–1	12–8
Minnesota	6–0	3–3	13–6	9–10	14–5	4–3	14–5	5–1	—	2–4	3–4	5–2	5–2	6–1	4–3	8–12
New York	17–2	14–5	3–4	3–4	3–3	3–4	5–2	5–2	4–2	—	2–4	6–1	12–7	3–3	11–8	12–8
Oakland	6–1	3–4	5–1	5–1	6–1	8–11	5–2	13–6	4–3	4–2	—	10–9	4–3	13–6	0–6	11–9
Seattle	4–3	3–4	4–2	1–5	6–1	1–18	5–2	9–10	2–5	1–6	9–10	—	2–4	8–11	4–2	9–11
Tampa Bay	12–7	12–7	4–2	6–1	4–2	4–3	4–3	4–3	2–5	7–12	3–4	4–2	—	3–3	13–6	14–6
Texas	6–1	3–4	3–4	3–4	6–0	6–13	5–2	10–9	1–6	3–3	6–13	11–8	3–3	—	3–3	9–11
Toronto	11–8	8–11	3–4	1–6	4–3	2–4	6–1	1–6	3–4	8–11	6–0	2–4	6–13	3–3	—	3–17

== Game log ==
2019 Game Log: 54–108 (.333) (Home: 25–56; Away: 29–52)
March/April: 10–20 (Home: 3–10; Away: 7–10)

#	Date	Opponent	Score	Win	Loss	Save	Attendance	Record	Streak
1	March 28	@ Yankees	2–7	Tanaka (1–0)	**Cashner** (0–1)	—	46,929	0–1	L1
2	March 30	@ Yankees	5–3	**Yacabonis** (1–0)	Paxton (0–1)	**Wright** (1)	42,203	1–1	W1
3	March 31	@ Yankees	7–5	**Means** (1–0)	Happ (0–1)	**Fry** (1)	38,419	2–1	W2
4	April 1	@ Blue Jays	6–5	**Hess** (1–0)	Reid-Foley (0–1)	**Bleier** (1)	10,460	3–1	W3
5	April 2	@ Blue Jays	2–1	**Cashner** (1–1)	Stroman (0–1)	**Castro** (1)	12,110	4–1	W4
6	April 3	@ Blue Jays	3–5	Shoemaker (2–0)	**Karns** (0–1)	Giles (2)	11,436	4–2	L1
7	April 4	Yankees	4–8	Paxton (1-1)	**Wright** (0–1)	—	44,182	4–3	L2
8	April 6	Yankees	4–6	Ottavino (1-0)	**Castro** (0-1)	Chapman (2)	27,504	4–4	L3
9	April 7	Yankees	3–15	Germán (2–0)	**Hess** (1-1)	—	33,102	4–5	L4
10	April 8	A's	12–4	**Cashner** (2-1)	Estrada (0-1)	—	6,585	5–5	W1
11	April 9	A's	2–13	Anderson (3–0)	**Means** (0–1)	—	7,738	5–6	L1
12	April 10	A's	3–10	Montas (2-1)	**Straily** (0-1)	—	7,974	5–7	L2
13	April 11	A's	5–8	Brooks (2–1)	**Bundy** (0–1)	Treinen (4)	8,374	5–8	L3
14	April 12	@ Red Sox	4–6	Rodríguez (1-2)	**Hess** (1-2)	Brasier (3)	33,664	5–9	L4
15	April 13	@ Red Sox	9–5	**Cashner** (3-1)	Porcello (0-3)	—	35,823	6–9	W1
16	April 14	@ Red Sox	0–4	Price (1-1)	**Means** (1–2)	—	36,023	6–10	L1
17	April 15	@ Red Sox	8–1	**Straily** (1-1)	Velázquez (0-1)	—	35,860	7–10	W1
18	April 16	@ Rays	2–4	Glasnow (4–0)	**Bundy** (0–2)	Castillo (2)	9,842	7–11	L1
19	April 17	@ Rays	1–8	Chirinos (3-0)	**Hess** (1-3)	—	9,028	7–12	L2
20	April 18	@ Rays	6–5 (11)	**Means** (2-2)	Castillo (0-1)	—	9,081	8–12	W1
21	April 20	Twins	5–6	Berríos (3–1)	**Yacabonis** (1-1)	Rogers (2)	28,409	8–13	L1
22	April 20	Twins	7–16	Pérez (2-0)	**Cobb** (0-1)	—	28,409	8–14	L2
23	April 21	Twins	3–4	Gibson (1–0)	**Bundy** (0–3)	Rogers (3)	11,018	8–15	L3
24	April 22	White Sox	2–12	Fry (1-0)	**Hess** (1-4)	—	8,555	8–16	L4
25	April 23	White Sox	9–1	**Cashner** (4-1)	Nova (0-3)	—	8,953	9–16	W1
26	April 24	White Sox	4–3	**Means** (3-2)	Santana (0-2)	**Givens** (1)	10,550	10–16	W2
27	April 26	@ Twins	1–6	Pérez (3–0)	**Cobb** (0–2)	—	23,658	10–17	L1
28	April 27	@ Twins	2–9	Berríos (4–1)	**Fry** (0–1)	—	18,878	10–18	L2
29	April 28	@ Twins	1–4	Gibson (2–0)	**Bundy** (0–4)	Parker (5)	20,034	10–19	L3
30	April 29	@ White Sox	3–5	Bañuelos (2–0)	**Means** (3–3)	Colomé (6)	14,717	10–20	L4
--	April 30	@ White Sox	Postponed (rain); Makeup: May 1						

May: 8–19 (Home: 5–11; Away: 3–8)

#	Date	Opponent	Score	Win	Loss	Save	Attendance	Record	Streak
31	May 1	@ White Sox	5–4	**Kline** (1–0)	Herrera (0–1)	**Givens** (2)	N/A	11–20	W1
32	May 1	@ White Sox	6–7	Vieira (1–0)	**Phillips** (0–1)	—	14,781	11–21	L1
33	May 3	Rays	0–7	Glasnow (6–0)	**Straily** (1–2)	—	10,034	11–22	L2
34	May 4	Rays	3–0	**Bundy** (1–4)	Chirinos (4–1)	**Givens** (3)	15,241	12–22	W1
--	May 5	Rays	Postponed (rain); Makeup: July 13						
35	May 6	Red Sox	4–1	**Means** (4–3)	Smith (0–1)	**Givens** (4)	11,042	13–22	W2
36	May 7	Red Sox	5–8	Walden (5–0)	**Kline** (1–1)	Barnes (3)	10,703	13–23	L1
37	May 8	Red Sox	1–2 (12)	Brasier (2–1)	**Ramírez** (0–1)	Hembree (1)	12,451	13–24	L2
38	May 10	Angels	3–8	Cahill (2–3)	**Straily** (1–3)	—	14,495	13–25	L3
39	May 11	Angels	2–7	Bard (1-1)	**Bundy** (1–5)	—	21,106	13–26	L4
40	May 12	Angels	5–1	**Means** (5–3)	Canning (1-1)	—	16,387	14–26	W1
—	May 13	@ Yankees	Postponed (rain); Makeup: May 15						
—	May 14	@ Yankees	Postponed (rain); Makeup: August 12						
41	May 15	@ Yankees	3–5	Happ (3-3)	**Hess** (1–5)	Chapman (10)	41,138	14–27	L1
42	May 15	@ Yankees	1–3	Germán (8–1)	**Cashner** (4–2)	Chapman (11)	41,138	14–28	L2
43	May 16	@ Indians	7–14	Cole (1-1)	**Ynoa** (0–1)	—	16,324	14–29	L3
44	May 17	@ Indians	5–1	**Bundy** (2–5)	Rodríguez (1–3)	—	22,999	15–29	W1
45	May 18	@ Indians	1–4	Plutko (1–0)	**Means** (5–4)	Hand (12)	25,562	15–30	L1
46	May 19	@ Indians	0–10	Bieber (3–2)	**Ramírez** (0–2)	—	21,377	15–31	L2
47	May 20	Yankees	7–10	Britton (2–0)	**Givens** (0–1)	Chapman (12)	16,457	15–32	L3
48	May 21	Yankees	4–11	Germán (9–1)	**Hess** (1–6)	Hale (1)	17,389	15–33	L4
49	May 22	Yankees	5–7	Sabathia (3–1)	**Straily** (1–4)	Chapman (13)	17,849	15–34	L5
50	May 23	Yankees	5–6	Kahnle (2–0)	**Givens** (0–2)	Britton (2)	30,624	15–35	L6
51	May 24	@ Rockies	6–8	Oberg (2–0)	**Givens** (0–3)	—	32,397	15–36	L7
52	May 25	@ Rockies	9–6	**Cashner** (5–2)	Freeland (2–6)	**Lucas** (1)	41,239	16–36	W1
53	May 26	@ Rockies	7–8	Oberg (3–0)	**Fry** (0–2)	—	46,815	16–37	L1
54	May 27	Tigers	5–3	**Straily** (2–4)	Norris (2–3)	**Armstrong** (1)	18,004	17–37	W1
55	May 28	Tigers	0–3	Boyd (5–4)	**Bundy** (2–6)	Greene (17)	8,106	17–38	L1
56	May 29	Tigers	2–4	Ramirez (1–0)	**Kline** (1–2)	Greene (18)	10,614	17–39	L2
57	May 31	Giants	9–6	**Cashner** (6–2)	Pomeranz (1–6)	**Bleier** (2)	17,545	18–39	W1

June: 6–20 (Home: 3–10; Away: 3–10)

#	Date	Opponent	Score	Win	Loss	Save	Attendance	Record	Streak
58	June 1	Giants	2–8	Anderson (1–1)	**Hess** (1–7)	—	19,352	18–40	L1
59	June 2	Giants	1–8	Samardzija (3–4)	**Ynoa** (0–2)	—	16,991	18–41	L2
60	June 4	@ Rangers	12–11	**Bundy** (3–6)	Smyly (1–4)	**Givens** (5)	21,903	19–41	W1
61	June 5	@ Rangers	1–2 (12)	Springs (3–1)	**Fry** (0–3)	—	21,163	19–42	L1
62	June 6	@ Rangers	3–4	Jurado (3–2)	**Hess** (1–8)	Kelley (7)	20,462	19–43	L2
63	June 7	@ Astros	3–4 (11)	Pérez (1–0)	**Kline** (1–3)	—	35,414	19–44	L3
64	June 8	@ Astros	4–1	**Fry** (1–3)	Harris (1–1)	**Castro** (2)	38,425	20–44	W1
65	June 9	@ Astros	0–4	Miley (6–3)	**Bundy** (3–7)	Osuna (17)	35,621	20–45	L1
66	June 11	Blue Jays	4–2	**Means** (6–4)	Thornton (1–5)	**Givens** (6)	12,524	21–45	W1
67	June 12	Blue Jays	6–8	Jackson (1–4)	**Hess** (1–9)	Hudson (1)	11,153	21–46	L1
68	June 13	Blue Jays	3–12	Stroman (4–8)	**Ynoa** (0–3)	—	14,910	21–47	L2
69	June 14	Red Sox	2–13	Rodríguez (7–4)	**Ortiz** (0–1)	—	19,383	21–48	L3
70	June 15	Red Sox	2–7	Sale (3–7)	**Bundy** (3–8)	—	30,050	21–49	L4
71	June 16	Red Sox	6–8	Workman (5–1)	**Givens** (0–4)	—	27,964	21–50	L5
72	June 17	@ A's	2–3	Fiers (7–3)	**Cashner** (6–3)	Treinen (16)	12,345	21–51	L6
73	June 18	@ A's	2–16	Anderson (7–4)	**Ynoa** (0–4)	—	14,310	21–52	L7
74	June 19	@ A's	3–8	Bassitt (4–3)	**Rogers** (0–1)	—	15,341	21–53	L8
75	June 20	@ Mariners	2–5	LeBlanc (4–2)	**Bundy** (3–9)	Elías (8)	15,217	21–54	L9
76	June 21	@ Mariners	9–10	Leake (7–6)	**Gilmartin** (0–1)	Elías (9)	23,281	21–55	L10
77	June 22	@ Mariners	8–4	**Cashner** (7–3)	Milone (1–2)	—	27,545	22–55	W1
78	June 23	@ Mariners	3–13	Kikuchi (4–5)	**Ynoa** (0–5)	—	23,920	22–56	L1
79	June 25	Padres	3–8	Allen (2–0)	**Yacabonis** (1–2)	—	21,644	22–57	L2
80	June 26	Padres	5–10	Strahm (3–6)	**Bundy** (3–10)	Stammen (4)	13,408	22–58	L3
81	June 28	Indians	13–0	**Means** (7–4)	Clevinger (1–2)	—	21,248	23–58	W1
82	June 29	Indians	13–0	**Cashner** (8–3)	Plesac (3–3)	—	26,998	24–58	W2
83	June 30	Indians	0–2	Bieber (7–3)	**Ynoa** (0–6)	Hand (23)	20,048	24–59	L1

July: 12–12 (Home: 4–5; Away: 8–7)

#	Date	Opponent	Score	Win	Loss	Save	Attendance	Record	Streak
84	July 1	@ Rays	3–6	Kolarek (3–2)	**Kline** (1–4)	Alvarado (7)	20,441	24–60	L2
85	July 2	@ Rays	3–6	Morton (9–2)	**Wojciechowski** (0–1)	—	20,925	24–61	L3
86	July 3	@ Rays	9–6	**Givens** (1–4)	Alvarado (0–5)	**Armstrong** (2)	21,545	25–61	W1
87	July 5	@ Blue Jays	4–1	**Bundy** (4–10)	Sanchez (3–12)	**Fry** (3)	20,530	26–61	W2
88	July 6	@ Blue Jays	8–1	**Cashner** (9–3)	Richard (1–5)	—	22,405	27–61	W3
89	July 7	@ Blue Jays	1–6	Thornton (3–6)	**Wojciechowski** (0–2)	—	22,487	27–62	L1
--	July 9	**90th All-Star Game in Cleveland, OH**							
90	July 12	Rays	4–16	Chirinos (8–4)	**Bundy** (4–11)	—	22,422	27–63	L2
91	July 13	Rays	2–1	**Bleier** (1–0)	Poche (2–2)	**Givens** (7)	22,596	28–63	W1
92	July 13	Rays	4–12	Morton (11–2)	**Means** (7–5)	—	24,810	28–64	L1
93	July 14	Rays	1–4	Yarbrough (8–3)	**Eshelman** (0–1)	Pagán (6)	14,082	28–65	L2
94	July 16	Nationals	1–8	Voth (1–0)	**Wojciechowski** (0–3)	—	23,362	28–66	L3
95	July 17	Nationals	9–2	**Ynoa** (1–6)	Suero (2–5)	**Givens** (8)	20,786	29–66	W1
96	July 19	Red Sox	11–2	**Means** (8–5)	Price (7–3)	—	18,243	30–66	W2
97	July 20	Red Sox	6–17	Porcello (8–7)	**Eshelman** (0–2)	—	21,339	30–67	L1
98	July 21	Red Sox	5–0	**Wojciechowski** (1–3)	Cashner (9–5)	—	18,173	31–67	W1
99	July 22	@ Diamondbacks	3–6	Ray (9–6)	**Brooks** (2–4)	Holland (16)	19,192	31–68	L1
100	July 23	@ Diamondbacks	7–2	**Bundy** (5–11)	Kelly (7–10)	—	20,253	32–68	W1
101	July 24	@ Diamondbacks	2–5	Clarke (3–3)	**Means** (8–6)	López (1)	20,452	32–69	L1
102	July 25	@ Angels	10–8 (16)	**Scott** (1–0)	Canning (3–6)	**Wilkerson** (1)	36,214	33–69	W1
103	July 26	@ Angels	9–3	**Wojciechowski** (2–3)	Tropeano (0–1)	—	38,852	34–69	W2
104	July 27	@ Angels	8–7	**Bleier** (2–0)	Buttrey (6–5)	**Givens** (9)	42,289	35–69	W3
105	July 28	@ Angels	4–5	Cole (1–1)	**Givens** (1–5)	—	35,447	35–70	L1
106	July 29	@ Padres	1–8	Paddack (7–5)	**Hess** (1–10)	—	34,290	35–71	L2
107	July 30	@ Padres	8–5	**Castro** (1–1)	Strahm (4–8)	**Armstrong** (3)	30,286	36–71	W1

August: 9–19 (Home: 7–10; Away: 2–9)

#	Date	Opponent	Score	Win	Loss	Save	Attendance	Record	Streak
108	August 1	Blue Jays	2–11	Thornton (4–7)	**Wojciechowski** (2–4)	—	9,716	36–72	L1
109	August 2	Blue Jays	2–5	Kingham (4–2)	**Brooks** (2–5)	Law (1)	16,331	36–73	L2
110	August 3	Blue Jays	6–4	**Givens** (2–5)	Boshers (0–1)	**Fry** (3)	12,951	37–73	W1
111	August 4	Blue Jays	6–5	**Eshelman** (1–2)	Reid-Foley (1–2)	**Armstrong** (4)	18,837	38–73	W2
112	August 5	Yankees	6–9	Ottavino (5–3)	**Fry** (1–4)	Chapman (30)	20,151	38–74	L1
113	August 6	Yankees	4–9	Cortes Jr. (5–0)	**Wojciechowski** (2–5)	Ottavino (1)	17,201	38–75	L2
114	August 7	Yankees	2–14	Paxton (7–6)	**Means** (8–7)	—	16,299	38–76	L3
115	August 9	Astros	2–3	Miley (11–4)	**Bundy** (5–12)	Osuna (26)	19,407	38–77	L4
116	August 10	Astros	2–23	Sanchez (5–14)	**Brooks** (2–6)	—	21,903	38–78	L5
117	August 11	Astros	8–7	**Bleier** (3–0)	Osuna (3–3)	—	17,979	39–78	W1
118	August 12	@ Yankees	5–8	Paxton (8–6)	**Ynoa** (1–7)	Chapman (32)	42,843	39–79	L1
119	August 12	@ Yankees	8–11	Mantiply (1–0)	**Blach** (0–1)	Ottavino (2)	40,354	39–80	L2
120	August 13	@ Yankees	3–8	Germán (16–2)	**Means** (8–8)	—	41,284	39–81	L3
121	August 14	@ Yankees	5–6	Happ (10–7)	**Bundy** (5–13)	Chapman (33)	43,909	39–82	L4
122	August 16	@ Red Sox	1–9	Porcello (11–9)	**Brooks** (2–7)	—	37,213	39–83	L5
123	August 17	@ Red Sox	0–4	Rodríguez (11–9)	**Wojciechowski** (2–6)	—	36,744	39–84	L6
124	August 18	@ Red Sox	7–13	Walden (8–2)	**Fry** (1–5)	—	36,350	39–85	L7
125	August 19	Royals	4–5	López (2–7)	**Means** (8–9)	Kennedy (22)	11,659	39–86	L8
126	August 20	Royals	4–1	**Harvey** (1–0)	Barnes (1–2)	**Givens** (10)	11,826	40–86	W1
127	August 21	Royals	8–1	**Brooks** (3–7)	Montgomery (3–6)	—	9,872	41–86	W2
128	August 22	Rays	2–5	Drake (2–1)	**Castro** (1–2)	Pagán (14)	8,153	41–87	L1
129	August 23	Rays	1–7	Richards (4–12)	**Blach** (0–2)	Slegers (1)	14,762	41–88	L2
130	August 24	Rays	7–1	**Means** (9–9)	Alvarado (1–6)	—	11,409	42–88	W1
131	August 25	Rays	8–3	**Bundy** (6–13)	Castillo (2–7)	—	13,287	43–88	W2
132	August 27	@ Nationals	2–0	**Brooks** (4–7)	Corbin (10–6)	**Givens** (11)	24,946	44–88	W3
133	August 28	@ Nationals	4–8	Suero (5–7)	**Wojciechowski** (2–7)	—	25,174	44–89	L1
134	August 30	@ Royals	14–2	**Means** (10–9)	Skoglund (0–1)	—	16,287	45–89	W1
135	August 31	@ Royals	5–7	Barlow (3–3)	**Fry** (1–6)	Kennedy (24)	18,385	45–90	L1

September: 9–18 (Home: 3–10; Away: 6–8)

#	Date	Opponent	Score	Win	Loss	Save	Attendance	Record	Streak
136	September 1	@ Royals	4–6	McCarthy (3–2)	**Fry** (1–7)	Kennedy (25)	18,208	45–91	L2
137	September 2	@ Rays	4–5 (10)	Poche (4–4)	**Tate** (0–1)	—	10,566	45–92	L3
138	September 3	@ Rays	4–2	**Blach** (1–2)	Drake (3–2)	**Bleier** (3)	N/A	46–92	W1
139	September 3	@ Rays	0–2	Castillo (3–8)	**Ynoa** (1–8)	Pagán (17)	6,844	46–93	L1
140	September 5	Rangers	1–3	Allard (4–0)	**Means** (10–10)	Leclerc (10)	8,209	46–94	L2
141	September 6	Rangers	6–7	Martin (2–3)	**Fry** (1–8)	Leclerc (11)	10,596	46–95	L3
142	September 7	Rangers	4–9	Méndez (1–0)	**Brooks** (4–8)	—	11,796	46–96	L4
143	September 8	Rangers	4–10	Minor (13–8)	**Wojciechowski** (2–8)	—	16,142	46–97	L5
144	September 10	Dodgers	3–7	Buehler (13–3)	**Blach** (1–3)	—	12,356	46–98	L6
145	September 11	Dodgers	7–3	**Armstrong** (1–1)	Ferguson (1–2)	—	11,438	47–98	W1
146	September 12	Dodgers	2–4	Gonsolin (3–2)	**Bundy** (6–14)	Jansen (29)	12,746	47–99	L1
147	September 13	@ Tigers	6–2	**Brooks** (5–8)	Zimmermann (1–11)	—	14,722	48–99	W1
148	September 14	@ Tigers	4–8 (12)	Schreiber (2–0)	**Fry** (1–9)	—	17,760	48–100	L1
149	September 15	@ Tigers	8–2	**Wojciechowski** (3–8)	Jackson (3–10)	—	15,688	49–100	W1
150	September 16	@ Tigers	2–5	Alexander (1–3)	**Means** (10–11)	Jiménez (7)	14,142	49–101	L1
151	September 17	Blue Jays	5–8	Law (1–2)	**Givens** (2–6)	—	9,280	49–102	L2
152	September 18	Blue Jays	10–11	Stewart (4–0)	**Castro** (1–3)	Law (5)	9,066	49–103	L3
153	September 19	Blue Jays	4–8	Kay (1–0)	**Ynoa** (1–9)	—	10,148	49–104	L4
154	September 20	Mariners	5–3	**Brooks** (6–8)	Hernández (1–7)	—	11,714	50–104	W1
155	September 21	Mariners	6–7 (13)	Altavilla (2–1)	**Scott** (1–1)	Swanson (2)	22,556	50–105	L1
156	September 22	Mariners	2–1	**Means** (11–11)	Gonzales (16–10)	**Bleier** (4)	17,540	51–105	W1
157	September 23	@ Blue Jays	10–11 (15)	Adam (3–0)	**Eades** (0–1)	—	13,193	51–106	L1
158	September 24	@ Blue Jays	11–4	**Bundy** (7–14)	Pannone (3–6)	—	12,625	52–106	W1
159	September 25	@ Blue Jays	2–3	Waguespack (5–5)	**Ynoa** (1–10)	Giles (22)	13,853	52–107	L1
160	September 27	@ Red Sox	4–1	**Wojciechowski** (4–8)	Eovaldi (2–1)	—	34,533	53–107	W1
161	September 28	@ Red Sox	9–4	**Means** (12–11)	Chacín (3–12)	—	36,414	54–107	W2
162	September 29	@ Red Sox	4–5	Workman (10–1)	**Tate** (0–2)	—	35,427	54–108	L1

Legend: = Win = Loss = Postponement
Bold = Orioles team member

== Player stats ==
=== Batting ===
Note: G = Games played; AB = At bats; R = Runs; H = Hits; 2B = Doubles; 3B = Triples; HR = Home runs; RBI = Runs batted in; SB = Stolen bases; BB = Walks; AVG = Batting average; SLG = Slugging average

Player	G	AB	R	H	2B	3B	HR	RBI	SB	BB	AVG	SLG
Jonathan Villar	162	642	111	176	33	5	24	73	40	61	.274	.453
Trey Mancini	154	602	106	175	38	2	35	97	1	63	.291	.535
Renato Núñez	151	541	72	132	24	0	31	90	1	44	.244	.460
Hanser Alberto	139	524	62	160	21	2	12	51	4	16	.305	.422
Anthony Santander	93	380	46	99	20	1	20	59	1	19	.261	.476
Rio Ruiz	127	370	35	86	13	2	12	46	0	40	.232	.376
Dwight Smith Jr.	101	357	46	86	16	3	13	53	5	26	.241	.412
Stevie Wilkerson	117	329	41	74	18	2	10	35	3	22	.225	.383
Chris Davis	105	307	26	55	9	0	12	36	0	39	.179	.326
Pedro Severino	96	305	37	76	13	0	13	44	3	29	.249	.420
Richie Martin	120	283	29	59	8	3	6	23	10	14	.208	.322
Chance Sisco	59	167	29	35	7	0	8	20	0	22	.210	.395
DJ Stewart	44	126	15	30	6	0	4	15	1	14	.238	.381
Joey Rickard	42	118	10	24	7	2	2	6	3	14	.203	.347
Keon Broxton	37	103	14	21	3	0	4	9	4	8	.204	.350
Jace Peterson	29	100	14	22	3	1	2	11	4	6	.220	.330
Austin Wynns	28	70	8	15	1	0	1	5	0	3	.214	.271
Austin Hays	21	68	12	21	6	0	4	13	2	7	.309	.574
Cedric Mullins	22	64	7	6	0	2	0	4	1	4	.094	.156
Jesús Sucre	20	62	3	13	2	0	0	3	0	4	.210	.242
Mason Williams	11	30	4	8	1	0	0	2	1	3	.267	.300
Mark Trumbo	12	29	1	5	3	0	0	3	0	2	.172	.276
Drew Jackson	3	3	0	0	0	0	0	0	0	1	.000	.000
José Rondón	1	1	0	0	0	0	0	0	0	0	.000	.000
Pitcher totals	162	15	1	1	0	0	0	0	0	1	.067	.067
Team totals	162	5596	729	1379	252	25	213	698	84	462	.246	.415

=== Pitching ===
Note: W = Wins; L = Losses; ERA = Earned run average; G = Games pitched; GS = Games started; SV = Saves; IP = Innings pitched; H = Hits allowed; R = Runs allowed; ER = Earned runs allowed; BB = Walks allowed; SO = Strikeouts

Player	W	L	ERA	G	GS	SV	IP	H	R	ER	BB	SO
Dylan Bundy	7	14	4.79	30	30	0	161.2	161	95	86	58	162
John Means	12	11	3.60	31	27	0	155.0	138	68	62	38	121
Gabriel Ynoa	1	10	5.61	36	13	0	110.2	126	77	69	26	67
Andrew Cashner	9	3	3.83	17	17	0	96.1	86	45	41	29	66
Asher Wojciechowski	4	8	4.92	17	16	0	82.1	80	46	45	28	80
David Hess	1	10	7.09	23	14	0	80.0	94	73	63	30	68
Miguel Castro	1	3	4.66	65	0	2	73.1	63	42	38	41	71
Mychal Givens	2	6	4.57	58	0	11	63.0	49	35	32	26	86
Aaron Brooks	4	5	6.18	14	12	0	59.2	69	43	41	20	39
Paul Fry	1	9	5.34	66	0	3	57.1	54	39	34	29	55
Richard Bleier	3	0	5.37	53	1	4	55.1	65	34	33	8	30
Shawn Armstrong	1	0	5.13	51	0	4	54.1	58	32	31	26	60
Dan Straily	2	4	9.82	14	8	0	47.2	73	53	52	22	33
Branden Kline	1	4	5.93	34	0	0	41.0	44	28	27	19	34
Jimmy Yacabonis	1	2	6.80	29	4	0	41.0	51	32	31	24	33
Thomas Eshelman	1	2	6.50	10	4	0	36.0	47	31	26	11	22
Evan Phillips	0	1	6.43	25	0	0	28.0	32	20	20	20	40
Tanner Scott	1	1	4.78	28	0	0	26.1	28	17	14	19	37
Dillon Tate	0	2	6.43	16	0	0	21.0	18	15	15	9	20
Ty Blach	1	3	11.32	5	5	0	20.2	32	27	26	13	17
Chandler Shepherd	0	0	6.63	5	3	0	19.0	23	15	14	6	17
Josh Lucas	0	0	5.74	9	0	1	15.2	14	12	10	7	16
Josh Rogers	0	1	8.79	5	0	0	14.1	18	14	14	6	5
Mike Wright	0	1	9.45	10	0	1	13.1	20	14	14	7	14
Alex Cobb	0	2	10.95	3	3	0	12.1	21	16	15	2	8
Yefry Ramírez	0	2	6.97	4	1	0	10.1	11	9	8	9	11
Tayler Scott	0	0	18.69	8	0	0	8.2	20	18	18	5	7
Ryan Eades	0	1	3.52	6	0	0	7.2	7	3	3	4	5
Hunter Harvey	1	0	1.42	7	0	0	6.1	3	1	1	4	11
Stevie Wilkerson	0	0	6.75	4	0	1	5.1	6	4	4	0	1
Nate Karns	0	1	0.00	4	2	0	5.1	7	1	0	3	5
Matt Wotherspoon	0	0	15.43	2	0	0	4.2	10	8	8	2	2
Luis Ortiz	0	1	10.80	1	1	0	3.1	4	4	4	5	3
Sean Gilmartin	0	1	19.29	1	1	0	2.1	7	5	5	2	1
Chris Davis	0	0	9.00	1	0	0	1.0	2	1	1	0	1
Hanser Alberto	0	0	18.00	1	0	0	1.0	1	2	2	2	0
Jesús Sucre	0	0	0.00	1	0	0	1.0	0	0	0	0	0
Pedro Araújo	0	0	27.00	1	0	0	0.2	2	2	2	1	0
Team totals	54	108	5.59	162	162	27	1443.0	1544	981	897	561	1248

== Roster ==
2019 Baltimore Orioles
Roster
Pitchers: 38 Pedro Araújo; 43 Shawn Armstrong; 53 Ty Blach; 48 Richard Bleier; 38 Aaron Brooks; 37 Dylan Bundy; 54 Andrew Cashner; 50 Miguel Castro; 17 Alex Cobb; 36 Ryan Eades; 32 Tom Eshelman; 51 Paul Fry; 60 Mychal Givens; 56 Hunter Harvey; 41 David Hess; 36 Nate Karns; 52 Branden Kline; 70 Josh Lucas; 67 John Means; 59 Luis Ortiz; 58 Evan Phillips; 32 Yefry Ramírez; 65 Josh Rogers; 66 Tanner Scott; 63 Tayler Scott; 62 Chandler Shepherd; 53 Dan Straily; 55 Dillon Tate; 29 Asher Wojciechowski; 71 Matt Wotherspoon; 43 Mike Wright; 31 Jimmy Yacabonis; 64 Gabriel Ynoa	Catchers: 28 Pedro Severino; 15 Chance Sisco; 40 Jesús Sucre; 61 Austin Wynns; Infielders: 57 Hanser Alberto; 19 Chris Davis; 1 Richie Martin; 39 Renato Núñez; 6 José Rondón; 14 Rio Ruiz; 2 Jonathan Villar	Outfielders: 9 Keon Broxton; 21 Austin Hays; 6 Drew Jackson; 16 Trey Mancini; 3 Cedric Mullins; 23 Jace Peterson; 23 Joey Rickard; 25 Anthony Santander; 35 Dwight Smith Jr.; 24 D. J. Stewart; 12 Steve Wilkerson; 40 Mason Williams; Other batters: 45 Mark Trumbo	Manager: 18 Brandon Hyde; Coaches: 13 Arnie Beyeler (first base); 26 Doug Brocail (pitching); 88 Howie Clark (assistant hitting); 34 Tim Cossins (field coordinator/catching); 11 José David Flores (third base); 27 José Hernández (coach); 86 Dustin Hughes (bullpen catcher); 30 Don Long (hitting); 47 John Wasdin (bullpen)

== Farm system ==
Level	Team	League	Manager
AAA	Norfolk Tides	International League	Gary Kendall
AA	Bowie Baysox	Eastern League	Buck Britton
A-Advanced	Frederick Keys	Carolina League	Ryan Minor
A	Delmarva Shorebirds	South Atlantic League	Kyle Moore
Short-Season A	Aberdeen IronBirds	New York–Penn League	Kevin Bradshaw
Rookie	GCL Orioles	Gulf Coast League	Alan Mills
Rookie	DSL Orioles	Dominican Summer League	Elvis Morel
