= Stevie Wilkerson =

American baseball player (born 1992)

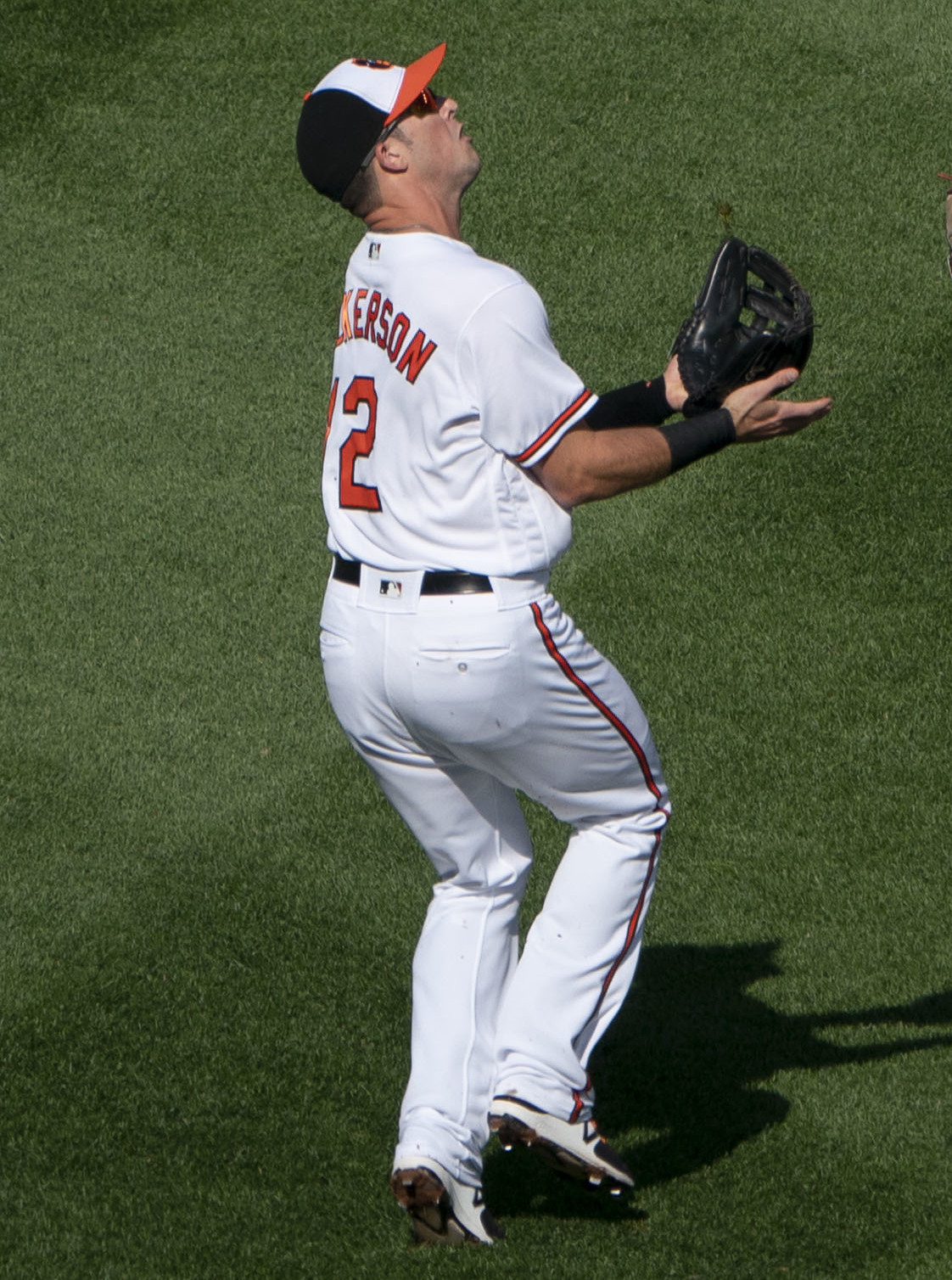
- Wilkerson with the Baltimore Orioles in 2018
- Utility player
- Born: January 11, 1992 (age 34); Roswell, Georgia, U.S.
- Batted: Switch Threw: Right

MLB debut
- June 20, 2018, for the Baltimore Orioles

Last MLB appearance
- June 26, 2021, for the Baltimore Orioles

MLB statistics
- Batting average: .210
- Home runs: 10
- Runs batted in: 40
- Stats at Baseball Reference

Teams
- Baltimore Orioles (2018–2019, 2021)

Career highlights and awards
- First ever position player to record a save in MLB

Stephen Beaty Wilkerson (born January 11, 1992) is an American former professional baseball utility player. He played in Major League Baseball (MLB) for the Baltimore Orioles. On July 25, 2019, he became the first MLB position player to ever record a save.

== Playing career ==
=== Amateur ===
Wilkerson graduated from Alan C. Pope High School in Marietta, Georgia, in 2010, where he had been a member of both the baseball and football teams. He was drafted in the 15th round of the 2010 MLB draft by the Boston Red Sox, but did not sign and instead enrolled at Clemson University where he played college baseball for the Clemson Tigers and completed a degree in communication studies. He played for the Hyannis Harbor Hawks of the Cape Cod Baseball League in the summers of both 2012 and 2013. As a senior, he batted .317 with six home runs and 42 runs batted in (RBIs) in 56 games. After his senior year, he was drafted by the Baltimore Orioles in the eighth round of the 2014 MLB draft.

=== Baltimore Orioles ===
Wilkerson signed with the Orioles and made his professional debut that same year with the Aberdeen IronBirds. In 60 games, he batted .190 with two home runs and 15 RBIs. In 2015, he played for the Delmarva Shorebirds where he slashed .287/.376/.371 with two home runs and 30 RBIs in 92 games, and in 2016, he spent the majority of the season with the Frederick Keys where he hit .251 with four home runs and 36 RBIs in 114 games. He also played in three games for the Bowie Baysox in mid-July. Wilkerson spent 2017 with both Frederick and Bowie, batting a combined .305/.375/.423 with eight home runs and 45 RBIs in 112 total games between both clubs. After the season, he played in the Arizona Fall League in 2017. There, he batted .317 and was named to the AFL Top Prospects Team.

On December 12, 2017, Wilkerson was suspended 50 games after testing positive for amphetamine. After serving his suspension, he was assigned to the Norfolk Tides.

Wilkerson was called up to the majors for the first time on June 19, 2018. He made his major league debut on June 20, entering the game to play third base in the ninth inning.

Wilkerson began 2019 with Norfolk after being designated for assignment when Pedro Severino was claimed off waivers on March 23 and outrighted five days later on March 28. He returned to the Orioles' 40-man roster when his contract was selected on April 22 but was optioned back to the Tides six weeks later on June 2 after batting .235/.283/.412 with six doubles, five home runs and 14 RBIs in 35 games. He was promoted for a second time four days later on June 6 to replace an injured DJ Stewart. He became the first-ever MLB position player to record a save in a 16-inning 10–8 away victory over the Los Angeles Angels that was played on July 25, 2019, but spilled into the early hours overnight. He was the starting center fielder who had tied the contest at 4–4 with a 2-out RBI ground-rule double to right field off Ty Buttrey in the eighth inning. His pitching achievement ended a game that lasted six hours and 19 minutes and established at the time the second longest game in Orioles history. He made a total of four relief pitching appearances during the campaign. Primarily an infielder, he was a starting outfielder in 80 games including 58 in center, a position he had never played previously in his professional career and one the Orioles had trouble filling with a reliable starter. He ended the 2019 season appearing in 117 games, hitting .225 with 10 home runs. He had the lowest batting average against left-handers of all major league batters with 100 or more at bats against them (.154). Wilkerson was designated for assignment by the Orioles on January 31, 2020, and outrighted on February 5. Wilkerson was released by the Orioles on September 14, 2020. He re-signed with the Orioles organization on October 25, 2020.

On May 18, 2021, Wilkerson was selected to the active roster. On June 30, 2021, Wilkerson was designated for assignment by the Orioles after struggling to a .167/.211/.208 slash line in 30 games. He was outrighted to Norfolk on July 3. On August 17, Wilkerson was released by the Orioles.

=== Mariachis de Guadalajara ===
On March 29, 2022, Wilkerson signed with the Mariachis de Guadalajara of the Mexican League. He appeared in 13 games for Guadalajara, slashing a robust .347/.458/.571 with two home runs and six RBI.

=== Chicago Dogs ===
On June 24, 2022, Wilkerson was loaned by Guadalajara to the Chicago Dogs of the American Association of Professional Baseball. Wilkerson appeared in 53 games for Chicago down the stretch, batting .264/.323/.415 with eight home runs and 35 RBI. On February 3, 2023, he was released by the Dogs.

== Coaching career ==
On February 17, 2023, it was announced that Wilkerson would be joining the Gwinnett Stripers, the Triple-A affiliate of the Atlanta Braves, as a coach for the 2023 season.

On January 25, 2024, Wilkerson was named as the hitting coach for the Florida Complex League Braves.
