= Patrick Dorrian (baseball) =

American baseball player (born 1996)

- Third baseman
- Born: June 26, 1996 (age 30); Kingston, New York, U.S.
- Bats: Left Throws: Right

Patrick Ryan Dorrian (born June 26, 1996) is an American former professional baseball third baseman.

== Career ==
=== Atlanta Braves ===
Dorrian was drafted by the Atlanta Braves in the 12th round, with the 373rd overall selection, of the 2014 Major League Baseball draft from Kingston High School in Kingston, New York. He was assigned to the rookie-level Gulf Coast League Braves but was released without making an appearance on August 15, 2014.

Dorrian enrolled at Herkimer County Community College in Herkimer, New York, and later at Lynn University in Boca Raton, Florida, where he played college baseball for the Lynn Fighting Knights. In 2016, he played collegiate summer baseball with the Cotuit Kettleers of the Cape Cod Baseball League.

=== Pittsburgh Pirates ===
Dorrian was signed to a minor league contract by the Pittsburgh Pirates as a free agent on June 20, 2018. Dorian played for the rookie-level Gulf Coast League Pirates and rookie-level Bristol Pirates mostly as a third baseman, and batted .335/.432/.539 with two home runs, 39 RBI, and two stolen bases across 49 total appearances. He began the 2019 season with the Single-A Greensboro Grasshoppers, and slashed .256/.346/.443 with six home runs, 31 RBI, and eight stolen bases in 64 games.

=== Baltimore Orioles ===
On June 27, 2019, Dorrian was traded to the Baltimore Orioles as the player to be named later from a May 27 trade that saw the Pirates acquire Yefry Ramírez. He was subsequently assigned to the High-A Frederick Keys, where he spent the remainder of the year, hitting .233/.279/.344 with four home runs and 24 RBI across 51 appearances.

Dorrian did not play in a game in 2020 due to the cancellation of the minor league season because of the COVID-19 pandemic. In 2021, Dorrian began the year with the Double-A Bowie Baysox before being promoted to the Triple-A Norfolk Tides just before the end of the season. In 116 appearances split between the two affiliates, he batted .242/.354/.461 with career-highs in home runs (22) and RBI (67). He began the 2022 season with Triple-A Norfolk as a first baseman, and hit .161 with three home runs and 15 RBI across 46 contests.

=== Milwaukee Brewers ===
On June 23, 2022, Dorrian was traded to the Milwaukee Brewers organization in exchange for cash considerations. He was subsequently assigned to the Triple-A Nashville Sounds, where he made 48 appearances and hit .248/.346/.522 with 11 home runs and 25 RBI. There, Dorrian primarily held down third base but also saw significant playing time at second base.

With Nashville in 2023, he played regularly at second, third, and shortstop, making 100 total appearances and slashing .238/.312/.466 with 21 home runs, 65 RBI, and four stolen bases. Dorrian made 75 appearances for Nashville during the 2024 campaign, batting .172/.275/.251 with three home runs, 20 RBI, and two stolen bases. He elected free agency following the season on November 4, 2024.
