= Aaron Brooks (baseball) =

American baseball player (born 1990)

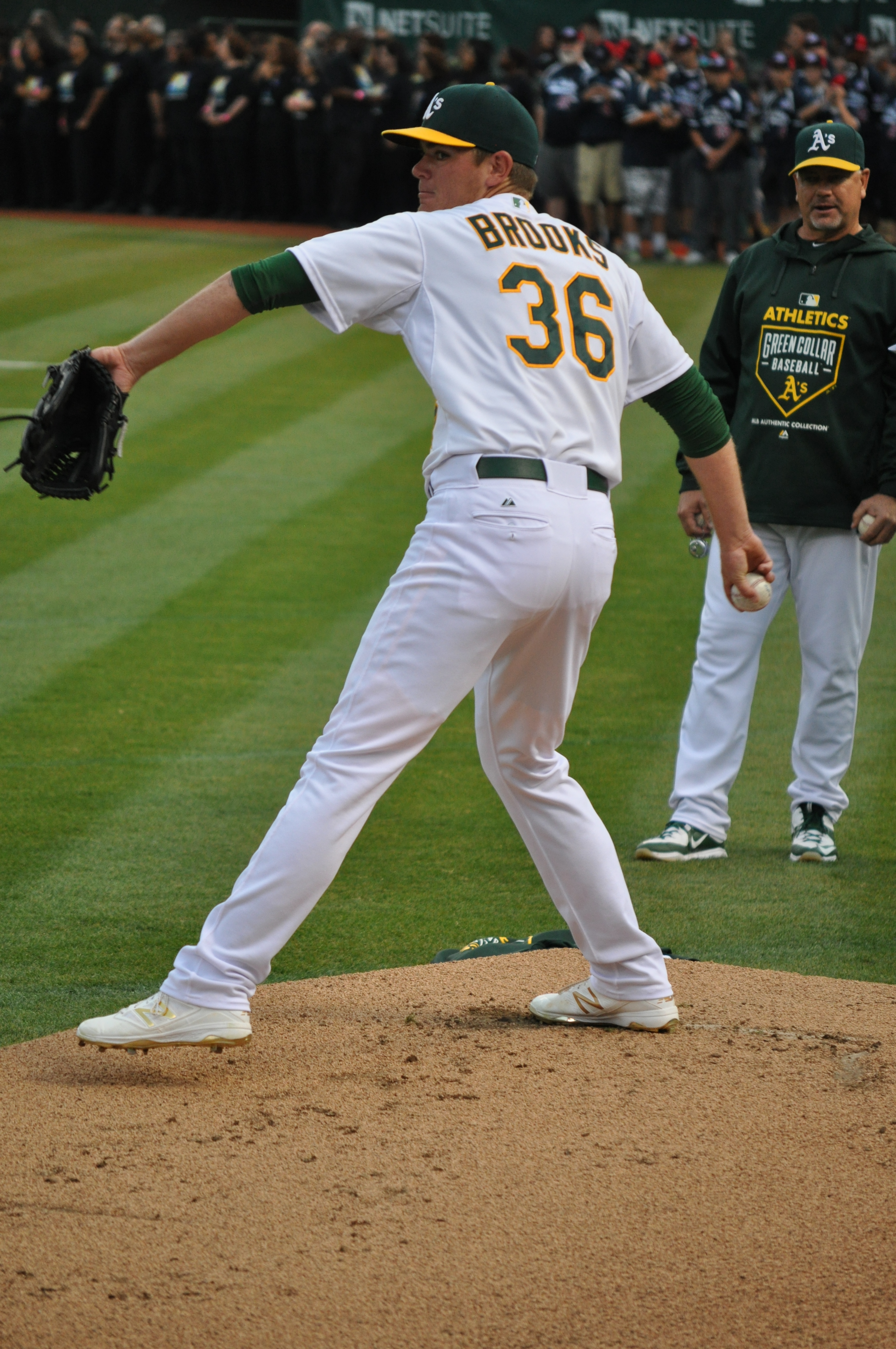
- Brooks pitching for the Oakland Athletics in 2015

Free agent
- Pitcher
- Born: April 27, 1990 (age 36); Montclair, California, U.S.
- Bats: Right Throws: Right

Professional debut
- MLB: May 3, 2014, for the Kansas City Royals
- KBO: May 6, 2020, for the Kia Tigers

MLB statistics (through 2026 season)
- Win–loss record: 9–16
- Earned run average: 6.48
- Strikeouts: 142

KBO statistics (through 2021 season)
- Win–loss record: 14-9
- Earned run average: 2.79
- Strikeouts: 185
- Stats at Baseball Reference

Teams
- Kansas City Royals (2014–2015); Oakland Athletics (2015, 2018–2019); Baltimore Orioles (2019); Kia Tigers (2020–2021); St. Louis Cardinals (2022); Oakland Athletics (2024); Tampa Bay Rays (2026)

Aaron Lee Brooks (born April 27, 1990) is an American professional baseball pitcher who is a free agent. He has previously played in Major League Baseball (MLB) for the Kansas City Royals, Oakland Athletics, Baltimore Orioles, St. Louis Cardinals, and Tampa Bay Rays, and in the KBO League for the Kia Tigers.

== Early years ==
Brooks attended Cajon High School in San Bernardino, California, and California State University, San Bernardino, where he played college baseball for the Cal State San Bernardino Coyotes.

== Professional career ==
=== Kansas City Royals ===
The Kansas City Royals selected Brooks in the ninth round of the 2011 MLB draft. Through the 2013 season, Brooks had issued only 1.3 walks per nine innings pitched in 393 1/3 total innings. The Royals invited Brooks to spring training in 2014. They assigned him to the Omaha Storm Chasers of the Triple–A Pacific Coast League (PCL) at the start of the 2014 season. Before he could pitch for Omaha, the Royals promoted Brooks to the major leagues on April 5, 2014. He was optioned back to Omaha on April 8 without appearing in a game. He made his MLB debut on May 3.

=== Oakland Athletics ===
On July 28, 2015, Brooks and teammate Sean Manaea were traded to the Oakland Athletics for Ben Zobrist. In his first game for the Athletics, he earned his first major league win.

=== Chicago Cubs ===
On February 25, 2016, Brooks was traded to the Chicago Cubs for outfielder Chris Coghlan. Due to a hip contusion, Brooks missed most of the 2016 season. When healthy, he pitched for the Iowa Cubs of the PCL. He was designated for assignment by the Cubs, never playing a single game for the team, on August 22, 2017.

=== Milwaukee Brewers ===
The next day, the Milwaukee Brewers claimed him off waivers. He pitched for the Colorado Springs Sky Sox of the PCL, and was promoted to the major leagues on August 30, 2018. The very next day, Brooks was designated for assignment by the Brewers, without appearing in a game, in order to make room on the roster for the team's acquisitions of Curtis Granderson and Gio González.

=== Oakland Athletics (second stint) ===
On September 3, 2018, Brooks was traded to the Oakland Athletics in exchange for cash considerations, his second stint with the organization. Brooks entered Spring training of 2019 competing for a rotation spot. He won the fifth spot in the rotation after numerous injuries sustained to other starters. On July 3, Brooks was designated for assignment.

=== Baltimore Orioles ===
On July 6, 2019, Brooks was claimed off waivers by the Baltimore Orioles. In 14 games (12 starts) for Baltimore, he compiled a 4–5 record and 6.18 ERA with 39 strikeouts across 59 2/3 innings pitched. After finishing the season with the Orioles, Brooks was released to pursue an opportunity in Korea on November 12.

=== Kia Tigers ===
On November 14, 2019, Brooks signed with the Kia Tigers of the KBO League. In 23 starts for Kia in 2020, Brooks pitched to an 11–4 record and 2.50 ERA with 130 strikeouts. On November 19, 2020, Brooks re-signed with the Tigers for the 2021 season, on a $1MM deal with a $200K signing bonus. Brooks worked to a 3.35 ERA in 13 starts for the Tigers in 2021. He was released by the team on August 9, 2021, after traces of marijuana were found in a vape pen he had ordered online.

=== St. Louis Cardinals ===
On January 31, 2022, Brooks signed a minor league contract with the St. Louis Cardinals. On March 25, the Cardinals selected Brooks’ contract and added him to the 40-man and Opening Day rosters. He appeared in 5 games for the Cardinals, but struggled to a 7.71 ERA, striking out 7 in 9.1 innings pitched.

On May 2, Brooks was designated for assignment by St. Louis when active rosters were reduced from 28 to 26. On May 5, he cleared waivers and was sent outright to the Triple-A Memphis Redbirds. He spent the remainder of the campaign in Memphis, logging a 5–4 record and 5.56 ERA with 54 strikeouts in 69.2 innings of work. On October 17, Brooks was released by the Cardinals organization.

=== San Diego Padres ===
On December 15, 2022, Brooks signed a minor league contract with the San Diego Padres. He spent the 2023 season with the Triple–A El Paso Chihuahuas, making 44 appearances and recording a 4.95 ERA with 51 strikeouts across 63 2/3 innings of work. Brooks elected free agency following the season on November 6, 2023.

=== Oakland Athletics (third stint) ===
On February 9, 2024, Brooks signed a minor league contract with the Oakland Athletics. In 8 starts for the Triple–A Las Vegas Aviators, he posted a 1–6 record and 4.57 ERA with 32 strikeouts across 43 1/3 innings of work. On May 15, the Athletics selected Brooks' contract to the major league roster and tabbed him as the starting pitcher for that day's game against the Houston Astros. In 4 starts for Oakland, he compiled a 5.82 ERA with 10 strikeouts across 21 2/3 innings pitched. On June 2, Brooks was designated for assignment by the Athletics. He cleared waivers and was sent outright to Las Vegas on June 4. On June 23, the Athletics purchased Brooks' contract back to the active roster, and after one appearance, Brooks was designated for assignment on June 25. He cleared waivers and was sent outright to Las Vegas on June 27. Brooks elected free agency on October 2.

=== Caliente de Durango ===
On January 31, 2025, Brooks signed with the Caliente de Durango of the Mexican League. In eight starts for Durango, he logged a 1-3 record and 5.92 ERA with 25 strikeouts over 38 innings of work. Brooks was released by the Caliente on June 4.

=== Athletics ===
On June 4, 2025, Brooks signed a minor league contract with the Athletics. He made 18 appearances (14 starts) split between the Double-A Midland RockHounds and Triple-A Las Vegas Aviators, accumulating a 3-7 record and 5.56 ERA with 66 strikeouts across 87 1/3 innings pitched. Brooks elected free agency following the season on November 6.

=== Caliente de Durango (second stint) ===
On April 9, 2026, Brooks signed with the Caliente de Durango of the Mexican League. He made one start for Durango, allowing two earned runs with four strikeouts across five innings pitched.

=== Tampa Bay Rays ===
On April 28, 2026, Brooks signed a minor league contract with the Tampa Bay Rays. On May 9, the Rays selected Brooks' contract, adding him to their active roster. In his only appearance for the team, he took the loss after allowing four runs (three earned) in 1/3 of an inning against the Toronto Blue Jays. On May 15, Brooks was designated for assignment by Tampa Bay. He cleared waivers and was sent outright to the Triple-A Durham Bulls on May 17. He elected free agency on October 5.
