= Ryan Eades =

American baseball player (born 1991)

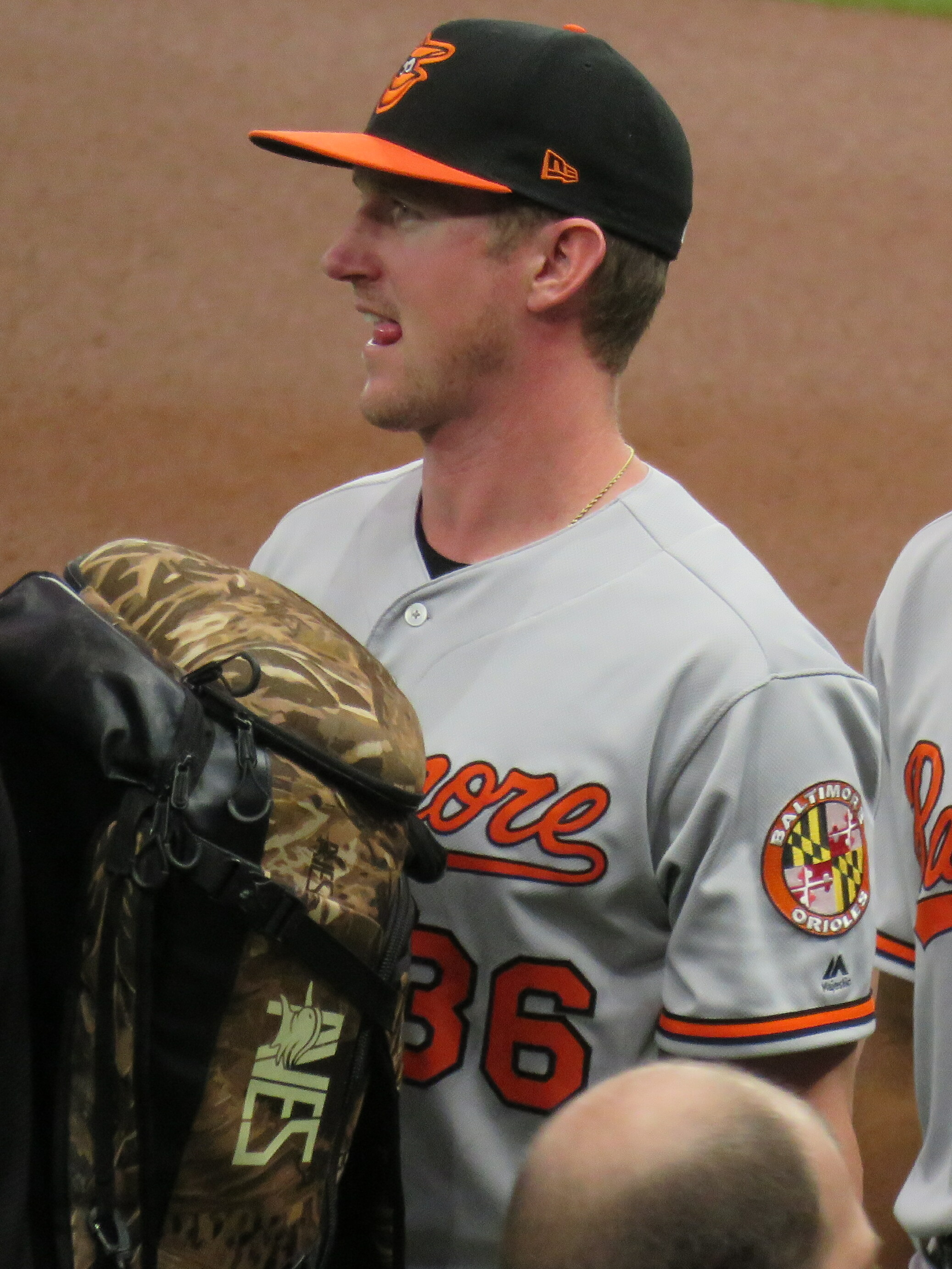
- Eades with the Baltimore Orioles in 2019
- Pitcher
- Born: December 15, 1991 (age 34); Slidell, Louisiana, U.S.
- Batted: Right Threw: Right

MLB debut
- June 8, 2019, for the Minnesota Twins

Last MLB appearance
- September 23, 2019, for the Baltimore Orioles

MLB statistics
- Win–loss record: 0–1
- Earned run average: 2.38
- Strikeouts: 10
- Stats at Baseball Reference

Teams
- Minnesota Twins (2019); Baltimore Orioles (2019)

Ryan Nelson Eades (born December 15, 1991) is an American former professional baseball pitcher. He played in Major League Baseball (MLB) for the Minnesota Twins and Baltimore Orioles.

== Career ==
=== Amateur ===
Eades attended Northshore High School in Slidell, Louisiana. He played for the school's baseball team, but could not pitch for the last part of his junior season and all of his senior season after a shoulder injury required surgery on his labrum. After the injury, he played as a first baseman and designated hitter. The Colorado Rockies selected him in the 19th round of the 2010 MLB draft, but he did not sign. Eades enrolled at Louisiana State University (LSU) to play college baseball for the LSU Tigers. In the summer of 2011, he played collegiate summer baseball for the Bourne Braves of the Cape Cod Baseball League, and was named the league's pitcher of the year. In his junior year at LSU, he pitched to a 2.79 ERA with 78 strikeouts in 100 innings.

=== Minnesota Twins ===
The Minnesota Twins selected Eades in the second round, with the 43rd overall selection, of the 2013 MLB draft. He signed with the Twins, receiving a $1.29 million signing bonus. After signing, he was assigned to the Elizabethton Twins of the Rookie-level Appalachian League and spent the whole season there, pitching to a 4.60 ERA in 15 2/3 innings. He played for the Cedar Rapids Kernels of the Single–A Midwest League in 2014, compiling a 10–11 record and 5.14 ERA in 26 games (25 starts), and the Fort Myers Miracle of the High–A Florida State League in 2015, going 6–3 with a 3.11 ERA and 1.24 WHIP in 20 starts. Eades spent the 2016 season with the Chattanooga Lookouts of the Double–A Southern League where he was 6–5 with a 4.61 ERA in 113 1/3 innings, and began the 2017 season with the Lookouts, before receiving a midseason promotion to the Rochester Red Wings of the Triple–A International League. In 30 total games between Chattanooga and Rochester in 2017, Eades pitched to a 6–3 record and 3.40 ERA in 30 games.

Eades opened the 2019 season with Rochester. On June 8, 2019, his contract was selected and he was promoted to the major leagues for the first time. He made his debut that day against the Detroit Tigers, throwing two scoreless innings in relief. Eades debuted wearing the jersey number 80, becoming the first player in Major League history to wear the number in a regular season game.

=== Baltimore Orioles ===
On August 14, 2019, Eades was claimed off waivers by the Baltimore Orioles and optioned to the Triple-A Norfolk Tides. In 6 games for the Orioles, he recorded a 3.52 ERA with 5 strikeouts across 7 2/3 innings pitched. On October 30, Eades was removed from the 40–man roster and sent outright to Norfolk. He elected free agency following the season on November 4.

=== Houston Astros ===
On May 4, 2021, Eades signed a minor league contract with the Houston Astros organization. Eades appeared in 7 games split between the rookie-level Florida Complex League Astros and Triple-A Sugar Land Skeeters, struggling to a 7.71 ERA with 12 strikeouts. On August 20, Eades was released by the Astros.

=== Lancaster Barnstormers ===
On August 27, 2021, Eades signed with the Lancaster Barnstormers of the Atlantic League of Professional Baseball. In 11 appearances for Lancaster, he logged a 1.50 ERA with 16 strikeouts across 12 innings pitched.

On May 27, 2022, Eades announced his retirement from professional baseball via Instagram.

== Personal life ==
Eades has a younger brother, who is also a baseball player. His father, Ned, used to play professional baseball and coached the baseball team at Northshore. Ned died in 2004 of lymphoma. His mother, Marian, coaches the softball team at Northshore. Eades proposed to his girlfriend, Alexa, after the 2013 season, and they were married in November 2015. They were featured on Say Yes to the Dress.
