= Gabriel Ynoa =

Dominican baseball player (born 1993)

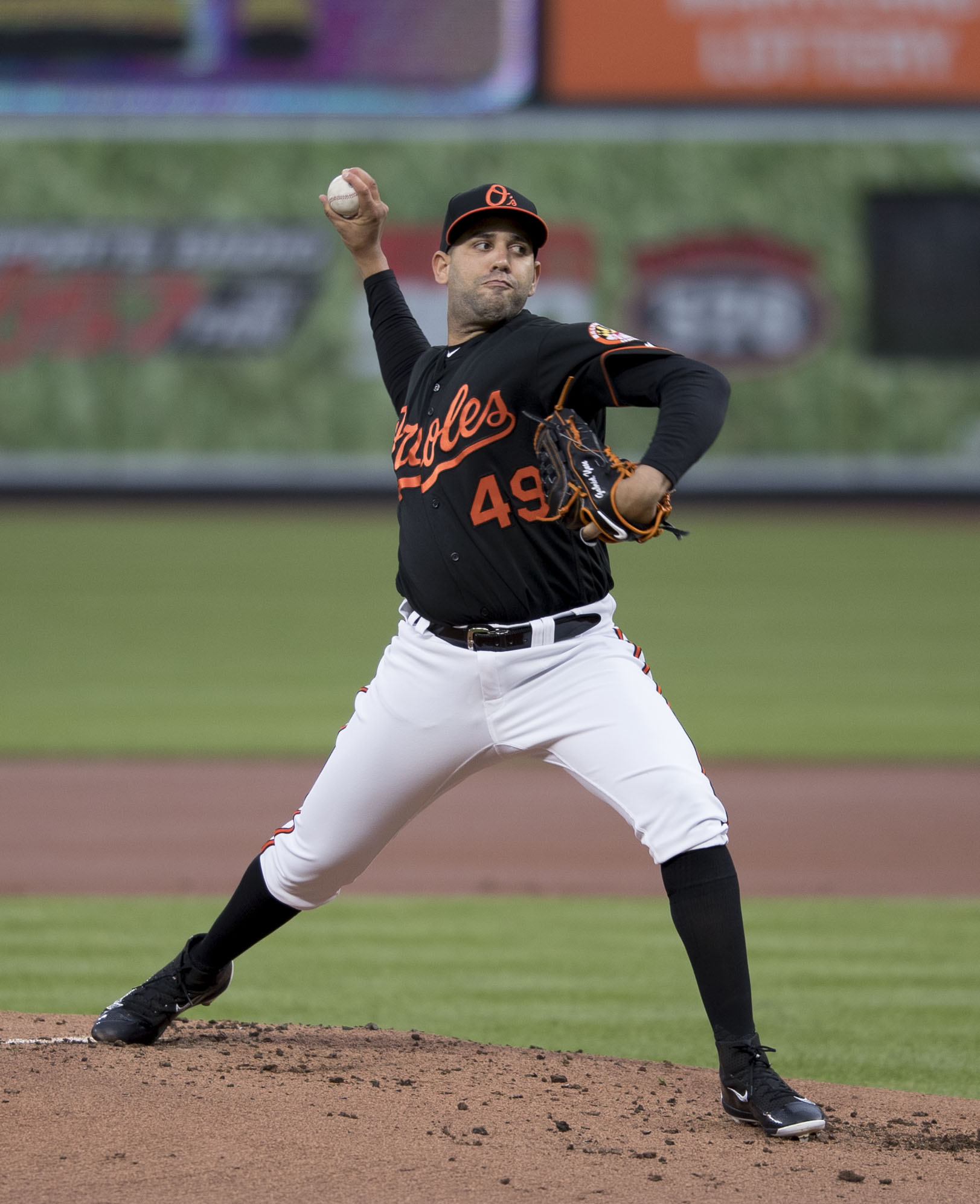
- Ynoa with the Orioles in 2017

El Águila de Veracruz – No. 35
- Pitcher
- Born: May 26, 1993 (age 33); La Vega, Dominican Republic
- Bats: Right Throws: Right

Professional debut
- MLB: August 13, 2016, for the New York Mets
- NPB: June 23, 2020, for the Tokyo Yakult Swallows
- CPBL: March 13, 2021, for the CTBC Brothers

MLB statistics (through 2019 season)
- Win–loss record: 4–13
- Earned run average: 5.39
- Strikeouts: 110

NPB statistics (through 2020 season)
- Win–loss record: 0–3
- Earned run average: 10.13
- Strikeouts: 15

CPBL statistics (through 2021 season)
- Win–loss record: 3–3
- Earned run average: 4.01
- Strikeouts: 61
- Stats at Baseball Reference

Teams
- New York Mets (2016); Baltimore Orioles (2017, 2019); Tokyo Yakult Swallows (2020); CTBC Brothers (2021)

Gabriel Ynoa Gómez (born May 26, 1993) is a Dominican professional baseball pitcher for El Águila de Veracruz of the Mexican League. He has previously played in Major League Baseball (MLB) for the New York Mets and Baltimore Orioles, in Nippon Professional Baseball (NPB) for the Tokyo Yakult Swallows, and in the Chinese Professional Baseball League (CPBL) for the CTBC Brothers.

== Career ==
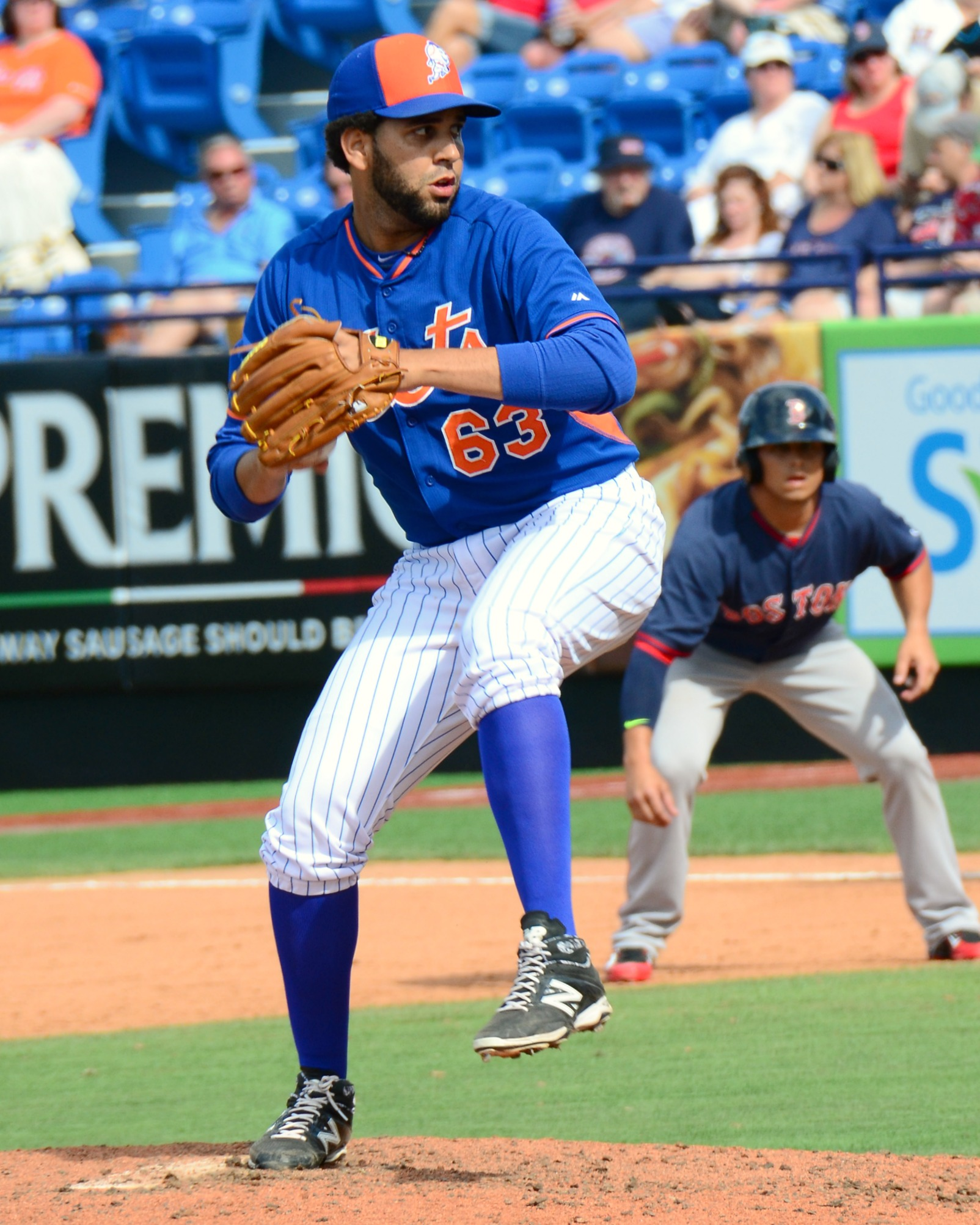
Ynoa with the Mets in 2015

=== New York Mets ===
Ynoa signed with the New York Mets as an international free agent in November 2009. He made his professional debut that season with the Dominican Summer League Mets. Pitching for the Savannah Sand Gnats in 2013, Ynoa was named the South Atlantic League Pitcher of the Year, after winning 15 games and recording a 2.72 earned run average (ERA). Ynoa started 2014 with the St. Lucie Mets and was promoted to the Double-A Binghamton Mets during the season.

Ynoa was called up to the major leagues for the first time on August 13, 2016. That night, he pitched a perfect 11th inning against the San Diego Padres at Citi Field to record a win in his major league debut.

=== Baltimore Orioles ===
On February 10, 2017, Ynoa was traded to the Baltimore Orioles in exchange for cash considerations. Ynoa made his debut with the Orioles on May 5 after being brought in from the bullpen in the first inning after Orioles' starter Wade Miley left the game with a wrist contusion. Ynoa threw six scoreless innings, allowing six hits while striking out five batters. It was Ynoa's longest career outing. He earned the victory in a 4-2 Orioles win. He missed the entire 2018 season with a right shin stress reaction. He was outrighted on November 1, then signed a minor league deal for the 2019 season.

Ynoa started the 2019 season with the Norfolk Tides. The Orioles promoted him to the major leagues on April 21. When his record fell to 1–10 as a result of a 3–2 defeat to the Toronto Blue Jays at Rogers Centre on September 25, he and David Hess became the first pair of teammates with double-digit losses and no more than one win since Jack Nabors and Tom Sheehan of the 1916 Philadelphia Athletics. Ynoa was outrighted off the Orioles roster on November 4, and elected free agency.

=== Tokyo Swallows ===
On December 6, 2019, Ynoa signed with the Tokyo Yakult Swallows of Nippon Professional Baseball. On June 23, 2020, Ynoa made his NPB debut. In 9 appearances for Tokyo, he struggled to an 0–3 record and 10.13 ERA with 15 strikeouts over 24 innings of work. On October 12, Ynoa became a free agent.

=== CTBC Brothers ===
On December 27, 2020, Ynoa signed with the CTBC Brothers of the Chinese Professional Baseball League (CPBL). On March 13, 2021, Ynoa made his CPBL debut against the Uni-President 7-Eleven Lions. Ynoa made 24 appearances for the Brothers, going 3–3 with a 4.01 ERA and 61 strikeouts. On October 4, Ynoa was released by the Brothers.

=== Pericos de Puebla ===
On March 30, 2022, Ynoa signed with the Pericos de Puebla of the Mexican League. In 18 games (17 starts) for the team, he logged a 7–6 record and 5.34 ERA with 54 strikeouts over 86 innings pitched.

Ynoa made 18 starts for the Pericos in 2023, registering a 7–3 record and 3.43 ERA with 65 strikeouts across 105.0 innings of work. With Puebla, Ynoa won the Serie del Rey. In 2024, Ynoa made 19 starts for Puebla and compiled a 9–4 record and 4.91 ERA with 43 strikeouts across 91 2/3 innings pitched.

=== Dorados de Chihuahua ===
On January 6, 2025, Ynoa was traded to the Dorados de Chihuahua of the Mexican League in exchange for Liarvis Breto. On March 25, it was announced that Ynoa would be sidelined due to a fractured tibia and fibula in his right leg. He did not appear in a game during the 2025 season.

Ynoa made eight appearances (including one start) for the Dorados in 2026, but struggled to a 0–3 record with a 12.71 ERA, nine strikeouts, and five walks across 11 1/3 innings pitched. On May 22, 2026, Ynoa was released by Chihuahua.

=== El Águila de Veracruz ===
On May 28, 2026, Ynoa signed with El Águila de Veracruz of the Mexican League.
