= Branden Kline =

American baseball player (born 1991)

- Pitcher
- Born: September 29, 1991 (age 34); Frederick, Maryland, U.S.
- Batted: Right Threw: Right

MLB debut
- April 20, 2019, for the Baltimore Orioles

Last MLB appearance
- September 25, 2020, for the Baltimore Orioles

MLB statistics
- Win–loss record: 1–4
- Earned run average: 5.48
- Strikeouts: 41
- Stats at Baseball Reference

Teams
- Baltimore Orioles (2019–2020)

Branden Alexander Kline (born September 29, 1991) is an American former professional baseball pitcher. He played in Major League Baseball (MLB) for the Baltimore Orioles in 2019 and 2020.

== Amateur career ==
Kline attended Governor Thomas Johnson High School in Frederick, Maryland. In his senior year, in 2009, he experienced an increase in velocity, reaching 95 miles per hour (153 km/h), which drew attention from scouts. He finished his senior year with a 6–1 win–loss record, a 0.51 earned run average (ERA) and 79 strikeouts in 41 innings pitched. The Boston Red Sox selected Kline in the sixth round, with the 198th overall selection, of the 2009 MLB draft. He opted not to sign, as he had already committed to attend the University of Virginia on a college baseball scholarship.

With the Virginia Cavaliers baseball team, Kline was used as a relief pitcher in his freshman and sophomore years. In his sophomore year, Kline recorded 18 saves, the third most in college baseball, and tying the Cavaliers' record and setting an Atlantic Coast Conference record. That year, he was also named a first-team All-American. As a junior, Kline had a 7–3 win–loss record, a 3.56 ERA, and 94 strikeouts in 93 2/3 innings, with 15 of his 16 appearances as a starting pitcher.

== Professional career ==
The Baltimore Orioles drafted Kline in the second round, with the 65th overall selection, of the 2012 MLB draft. He signed with the Orioles, receiving a signing bonus just below $800,000. He made his professional debut after signing with the Aberdeen IronBirds of the Low-A New York–Penn League, where he compiled a 4.50 ERA in 12 innings.

Kline pitched for the Delmarva Shorebirds of the Single-A South Atlantic League in 2013 where he was 1–2 with a 5.86 ERA in seven starts. He began the 2014 season with the Frederick Keys of the High-A Carolina League, and was named their Opening Day starting pitcher. In August, the Orioles promoted Kline to the Bowie Baysox of the Double-A Eastern League. In 26 starts between both teams, he was 8–8 with a 4.08 ERA. Kline spent the 2015 season with Bowie. By training with a weighted ball in the offseason, as suggested by teammate Tyler Wilson, Kline's fastball velocity improved from 90 to 94 miles per hour (145 to 151 km/h) to 93 to 97 miles per hour (150 to 156 km/h). In eight starts, he pitched to a 3–3 record and a 3.66 ERA.

In October 2015, Kline underwent Tommy John surgery. He missed the 2016 season, and had a follow-up surgery in March 2017, forcing him to miss all of that season as well. He returned to Frederick in 2018 as a relief pitcher. The Orioles added him to their 40-man roster after the season.

Kline opened the 2019 season with the Triple-A Norfolk Tides. On April 20, he was recalled to the major league roster for the first time, as the 26th man for a double-header versus the Minnesota Twins. He made his debut that night, recording two innings in relief.

Kline was designated for assignment by the Orioles on January 30, 2020, and outrighted on February 5. On September 4, Kline was selected back to the major leagues. Kline pitched to a 1.80 ERA with seven strikeouts over three appearances for the Orioles in 2020. He elected free agency on October 29.

On January 13, 2021, Kline announced his retirement from professional baseball via Instagram.
