= Josh Lucas (baseball) =

American baseball player (born 1990)

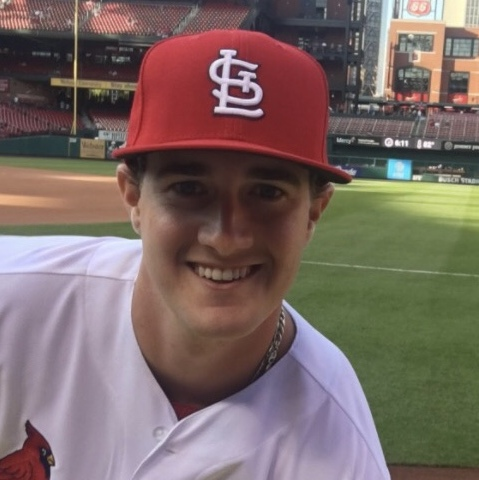
- Lucas with the St. Louis Cardinals
- Pitcher
- Born: November 5, 1990 (age 36); Lakeland, Florida, U.S.
- Batted: Right Threw: Right

MLB debut
- August 19, 2017, for the St. Louis Cardinals

Last MLB appearance
- June 13, 2019, for the Baltimore Orioles

MLB statistics
- Win–loss record: 0–0
- Earned run average: 5.54
- Strikeouts: 37
- Stats at Baseball Reference

Teams
- St. Louis Cardinals (2017); Oakland Athletics (2018); Baltimore Orioles (2019)

Joshua Timothy Lucas (born November 5, 1990) is an American former professional baseball pitcher. He played in Major League Baseball (MLB) for the St. Louis Cardinals, Oakland Athletics, and Baltimore Orioles.

== Career ==
=== Amateur career ===
Lucas graduated from Lakeland Senior High School in Lakeland, Florida in 2009. He attended the State College of Florida, Manatee–Sarasota, where he was a pitcher for their baseball team. As a freshman, Lucas had a 5–4 record and 4.26 ERA in 69.2 innings pitched. He was drafted by the St. Louis Cardinals in the 21st round, 649th overall, of the 2010 MLB draft.

=== St. Louis Cardinals ===
Lucas made his professional debut with the GCL Cardinals, recording a 4.88 ERA in 14 appearances. In 2011, Lucas played for the rookie-level Johnson City Cardinals, posting a 4–1 record and 4.00 ERA in eight starts

Lucas missed the 2012 season due to injury. He split the 2013 season between the GCL Cardinals, the Low-A State College Spikes, and the Single-A Peoria Chiefs, logging an 0–5 record and 7.48 ERA in six games.

The following season, Lucas split the year between State College, Peoria, and the High-A Palm Beach Cardinals, accumulating a 3–3 record and 1.70 ERA in 31 appearances. In 2015, Lucas split the year between Palm Beach and the Double-A Springfield Cardinals, pitching to a cumulative 4–3 record and 1.17 ERA with 46 strikeouts in 61.2 innings of work. For the 2016 season, Lucas split the season between Springfield and the Triple-A Memphis Redbirds, registering a 4-2 record and 4.03 ERA in 45 appearances between the two teams. He was assigned to Memphis to begin the 2017 season.

Lucas was selected to the 40-man roster and called up to the majors for the first time on August 19, 2017. He made his MLB debut the same day, pitching two innings of one-run ball against the Pittsburgh Pirates. He played in five games for St. Louis in his rookie year, posting a 3.68 ERA with seven strikeouts. After the season, the Cardinals assigned Lucas to the Surprise Saguaros of the Arizona Fall League. Lucas pitched 12 total innings in the AFL, posting a 1–2 record with a 5.25 ERA.

Lucas was designated for assignment by the Cardinals on March 28, 2018.

=== Oakland Athletics ===
On March 31, 2018, Lucas was traded to the Oakland Athletics in exchange for pitcher Casey Meisner and optioned to the Triple-A Nashville Sounds. He was recalled on April 20 but optioned back to Nashville the next day. He was recalled once again on May 8. He made his first major league start on May 24 against the Seattle Mariners. After posting a 6.28 ERA in eight major league games with Oakland, he was sent outright to Triple-A on September 1. In 31 games with Nashville, Lucas was 0–2 with a 2.56 ERA and with 32 strikeouts and 15 walks. He elected free agency on November 2.

=== Baltimore Orioles ===
On November 28, 2018, Lucas signed a minor league contract with the Baltimore Orioles organization that included an invitation to spring training. He did not make the team and was assigned to the Triple-A Norfolk Tides to begin the year. On April 11, 2019, the Orioles purchased his contract and recalled him to the major league roster. Lucas was designated for assignment on April 22 after yielding two earned runs in 4 1/3 innings and was outrighted on April 26. Lucas again had his contract selected on May 20. Lucas was again designated for assignment on July 6, after recording a 5.74 ERA in nine games. He was again sent outright to Norfolk, and had the option to decline the assignment, but accepted it. On August 19, the Orioles organization released Lucas.

=== Washington Nationals ===
On August 26, 2019, Lucas signed a minor league contract with the Washington Nationals organization. He finished the year with the Triple-A Fresno Grizzlies, pitching to a 1–0 record and 6.00 ERA in three games with the team. Lucas elected free agency following the season on November 4.

=== Long Island Ducks ===
On April 20, 2020, Lucas signed with the Long Island Ducks of the Atlantic League of Professional Baseball. However, he did not play a game for the team because of the cancellation of the 2020 ALPB season due to the COVID-19 pandemic.

=== Winnipeg Goldeyes ===
On August 30, 2020, Lucas signed with the Winnipeg Goldeyes of the American Association of Independent Professional Baseball. Lucas posted a 1.20 ERA with 18 strikeouts in 15 innings of work with the team. On January 20, 2021, Lucas re-signed with the Goldeyes.

=== Arizona Diamondbacks ===
On May 9, 2021, Lucas signed a minor league deal with the Arizona Diamondbacks and was assigned to the Triple-A Reno Aces. In 5 appearances for Reno, Lucas struggled to a 21.94 ERA, giving up 13 runs in 5 1/3 innings pitched, while striking out 3. On August 14, Lucas was released by the Diamondbacks organization.

=== Winnipeg Goldeyes (second stint) ===
On January 25, 2022, Lucas signed with the Winnipeg Goldeyes of the American Association of Professional Baseball.

=== Cleburne Railroaders ===
On June 24, 2022, Lucas was traded to the Cleburne Railroaders of the American Association of Professional Baseball for cash. In 17 games (nine starts) for Cleburne, he logged a 3.62 ERA with 53 strikeouts across 54 2/3 innings of work. On November 29, Lucas was released by the Railroaders.

=== Gateway Grizzlies ===
On December 7, 2022, Lucas signed with the Gateway Grizzlies of the Frontier League. He made 21 appearances for the Grizzlies, recording a 2.84 ERA with 43 strikeouts and four saves across 31 2/3 innings pitched.

On February 19, 2024, Lucas announced his retirement from professional baseball via Instagram.
