= Yefry Ramírez =

Dominican baseball player (born 1993)

- Pitcher
- Born: November 28, 1993 (age 32); Santo Domingo, Dominican Republic
- Batted: Right Threw: Right

Professional debut
- MLB: June 13, 2018, for the Baltimore Orioles
- KBO: June 21, 2022, for the Hanwha Eagles

Last appearance
- MLB: August 1, 2021, for the Los Angeles Dodgers
- KBO: September 11, 2022, for the Hanwha Eagles

MLB statistics
- Win–loss record: 1–10
- Earned run average: 6.19
- Strikeouts: 91

KBO statistics
- Win–loss record: 2–6
- Earned run average: 4.13
- Strikeouts: 47
- Stats at Baseball Reference

Teams
- Baltimore Orioles (2018–2019); Pittsburgh Pirates (2019); Los Angeles Dodgers (2021); Hanwha Eagles (2022)

Yefry Ramírez Alcala (born November 28, 1993) is a Dominican former professional baseball pitcher. He has previously played in Major League Baseball (MLB) for the Baltimore Orioles, Pittsburgh Pirates, and Los Angeles Dodgers, and in the KBO League for the Hanwha Eagles. Listed at 6 feet 2 inches (1.88 m) and 215 pounds (98 kg), Ramírez both throws and bats right-handed.

== Career ==
=== Arizona Diamondbacks ===
Ramírez signed with the Arizona Diamondbacks as an international free agent on May 28, 2011, as an infielder. He spent his first professional season with the Dominican Summer League Diamondbacks, hitting .169/.301/.213 with four RBI and two stolen bases across 44 games; Arizona transitioned him into a pitcher following the season.

Ramírez spent the next two seasons with the DSL Diamondbacks; he posted a 3.28 ERA with 18 strikeouts in 18 games in 2012, and logged an 0–6 record and 3.00 ERA over 13 games in 2013. He split the 2014 season between the rookie-level Arizona League Diamondbacks and rookie-level Missoula Osprey. In 13 appearances (10 starts) for the two affiliates, Ramírez posted a cumulative 6–3 record and 3.06 ERA with 65 strikeouts across 67 2/3 innings pitched.

In 2015, Ramírez made 14 appearances (13 starts) for Missoula, compiling a 5–5 record and 5.35 ERA with 61 strikeouts over 69 innings of work.

=== New York Yankees ===
On December 10, 2015, the New York Yankees selected Ramírez in the minor league phase of the Rule 5 draft. In 2016, he made 22 starts split between the Single-A Charleston RiverDogs and High-A Tampa Yankees, accumulating a 7–9 record and 2.82 ERA with 132 strikeouts across 124 1/3 innings pitched. On November 18, 2016, the Yankees added Ramírez to their 40-man roster to protect him from the Rule 5 draft.

Ramírez began the 2017 season with the Trenton Thunder of the Double-A Eastern League, registering a 10–3 record and 3.41 ERA with 91 strikeouts across 18 starts.

=== Baltimore Orioles ===
On July 31, 2017, the Yankees traded Ramírez to the Orioles, who assigned him to the Bowie Baysox of the Eastern League.

Ramírez started the 2018 season with the Triple-A Norfolk Tides. The Orioles briefly promoted him to the major leagues in April, but he did not appear in a game. He was recalled to the Orioles on June 13, and made his major league debut that day, taking the loss against the Boston Red Sox. He finished appearing in 17 games, 12 starts, posting a record of 1–8 in 65 1/3 innings. He was designated for assignment on May 22, 2019, after the team acquired outfielder Keon Broxton from the New York Mets. Before being designated for assignment, Ramírez appeared in four games in the 2019 season with one start, posting a 6.97 ERA, an 0–2 record, and 11 strikeouts against nine walks.

=== Pittsburgh Pirates ===
On May 27, 2019, Ramírez was traded to the Pittsburgh Pirates in exchange for a player to be named later or cash considerations. The Orioles acquired Patrick Dorrian a month later as the PTBNL. In nine appearances for Pittsburgh, he struggled to a 7.71 ERA with 16 strikeouts across 14 innings of work. Ramírez was removed from the 40-man roster and sent outright to the Triple-A Indianapolis Indians on November 4, but rejected the assignment and elected free agency.

=== New York Mets ===
On January 11, 2020, Ramírez signed a minor league contract with the New York Mets. He did not play in a game in 2020 due to the cancellation of the minor league season because of the COVID-19 pandemic. Ramírez was released by the Mets organization on September 20.

=== Los Angeles Dodgers ===
On March 25, 2021, Ramírez signed a minor league contract with the Los Angeles Dodgers organization. After beginning the season with the Triple–A Oklahoma City Dodgers, he was added to the major league roster on August 1. He pitched two scoreless innings in one game for the Dodgers before was designated for assignment on August 4. On August 7, Ramirez cleared waivers and outrighted back to Oklahoma City. In the minors, he was 6–4 with a 5.81 ERA in 25 games (24 starts) for Oklahoma City. He elected minor league free agency following the season on November 7.

On December 17, 2021, Ramírez re-signed with the Dodgers organization on a minor league contract. He made eight appearances (seven starts) for Triple-A Oklahoma City, posting a 2–1 record and 3.76 ERA with 30 strikeouts across 40 2/3 innings pitched.

=== Hanwha Eagles ===
On June 1, 2022, Ramírez signed with the Hanwha Eagles of the KBO League. In 13 starts for the Eagles, he logged a 2–6 record and 4.13 ERA with 47 strikeouts across 65 1/3 innings pitched. Ramírez became a free agent after the season.

=== Gastonia Baseball Club ===
On April 18, 2024, after a year of inactivity, Ramírez signed with the Gastonia Baseball Club of the Atlantic League of Professional Baseball. In one start for Gastonia, Ramírez tossed five scoreless innings with three strikeouts.

=== Kansas City Monarchs ===
On April 29, 2024, Ramírez was traded to the Kansas City Monarchs of the American Association of Professional Baseball. He made 5 starts for the Monarchs, posting a 6.65 ERA and 13 strikeouts over 21 2/3 innings. Ramírez was released by Kansas City on June 9.

== See also ==
- Rule 5 draft results
