= Jimmy Yacabonis =

American baseball player (born 1992)

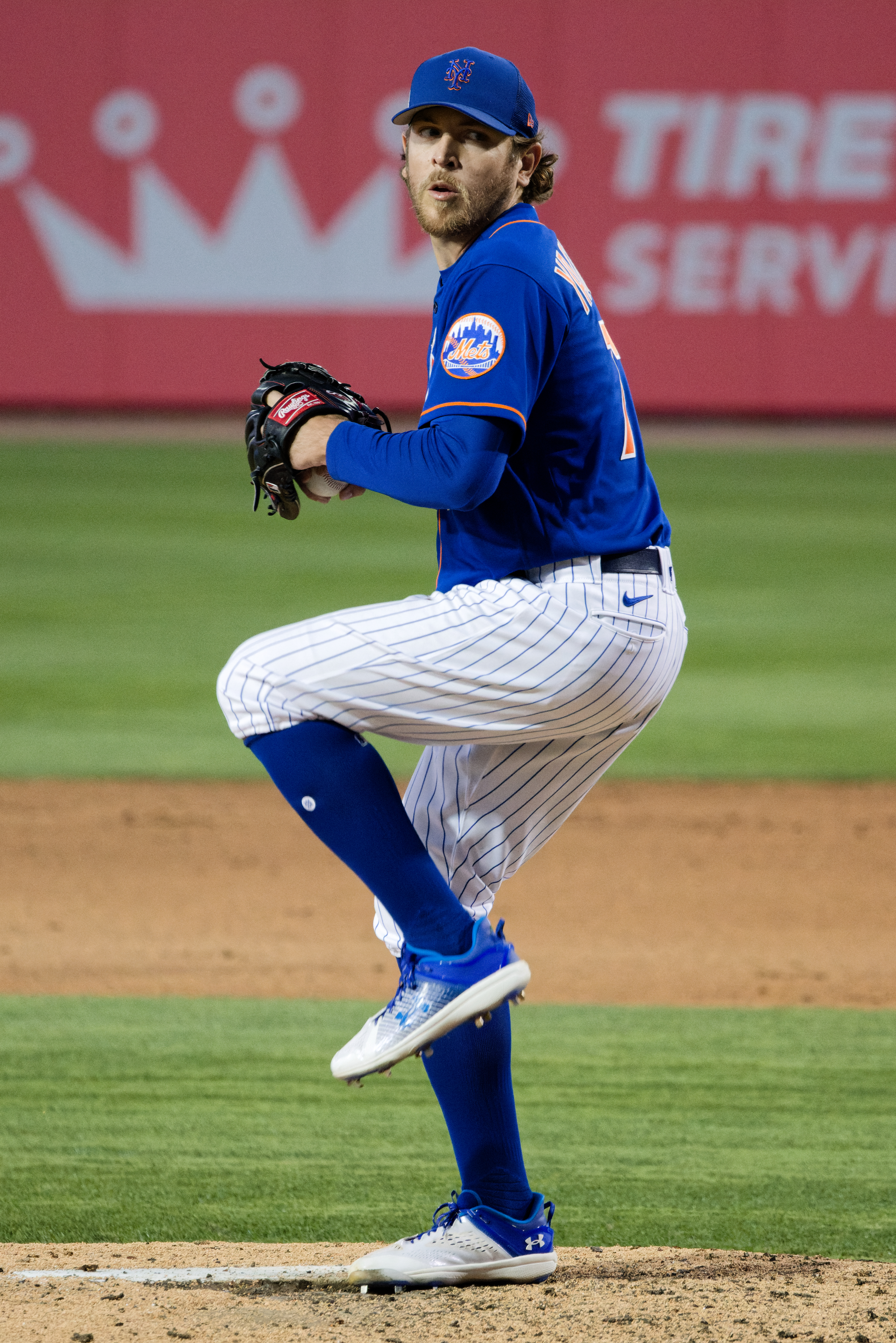
- Yacabonis with the Mets in 2023

Diablos Rojos del México – No. 43
- Pitcher
- Born: March 21, 1992 (age 34); Elizabeth, New Jersey, U.S.
- Bats: Right Throws: Right

MLB debut
- June 11, 2017, for the Baltimore Orioles

MLB statistics (through 2023 season)
- Win–loss record: 6–7
- Earned run average: 6.08
- Strikeouts: 107
- Stats at Baseball Reference

Teams
- Baltimore Orioles (2017–2019); Seattle Mariners (2020); Miami Marlins (2022); Tampa Bay Rays (2022); New York Mets (2023)

James Allin Yacabonis (born March 21, 1992) is an American professional baseball pitcher for the Diablos Rojos del México of the Mexican League. He has previously played in Major League Baseball (MLB) for the Baltimore Orioles, Seattle Mariners, Miami Marlins, Tampa Bay Rays, and New York Mets.

== Early life and education ==
Yacabonis is the son of Maria and James Yacabonis. His grandfather played professional baseball in Cuba.

Born in Elizabeth, New Jersey, and raised in Matawan, New Jersey, he attended the Saint Benedict School in Holmdel, New Jersey, followed by Christian Brothers Academy (CBA) in Lincroft, New Jersey.

At CBA, Yacabonis was a standout right-handed pitcher and served as one of the team's top arms during his junior and senior seasons. He helped lead CBA to strong performances in the highly competitive Shore Conference, earning all-division and all-county recognition.

Yacabonis went on to attend Saint Joseph's University in Philadelphia, Pennsylvania, where he pitched for the Saint Joseph's Hawks. He appeared in 60 games (all in relief) from 2011 to 2013, compiling a career 5–6 record with a 3.63 ERA and 83 strikeouts in 84.1 innings pitched. He set a then-school record with 27 appearances as a junior in 2013 and led the team in saves.

== Career ==
=== Baltimore Orioles ===
The Baltimore Orioles selected Yacabonis in the 13th round of the 2013 Major League Baseball draft as the 399th pick overall. He signed and spent 2013 with the Aberdeen IronBirds where he was 3–1 with a 1.52 ERA in 29.2 relief innings pitched. In 2014, he pitched for the Delmarva Shorebirds and Frederick Keys where he compiled a 1–5 record and 5.03 ERA in 38 games pitched out of the bullpen, and in 2015, he returned to Frederick where he posted a 3–3 record, 4.02 ERA, and 1.71 WHIP in 43 games pitched. Yacabonis spent 2016 with both Frederick and the Bowie Baysox where he was 2–4 with a 2.64 ERA in 50 relief appearances, holding hitters to a .216 batting average against. He was promoted to the Norfolk Tides to begin 2017.

==== 2017 ====
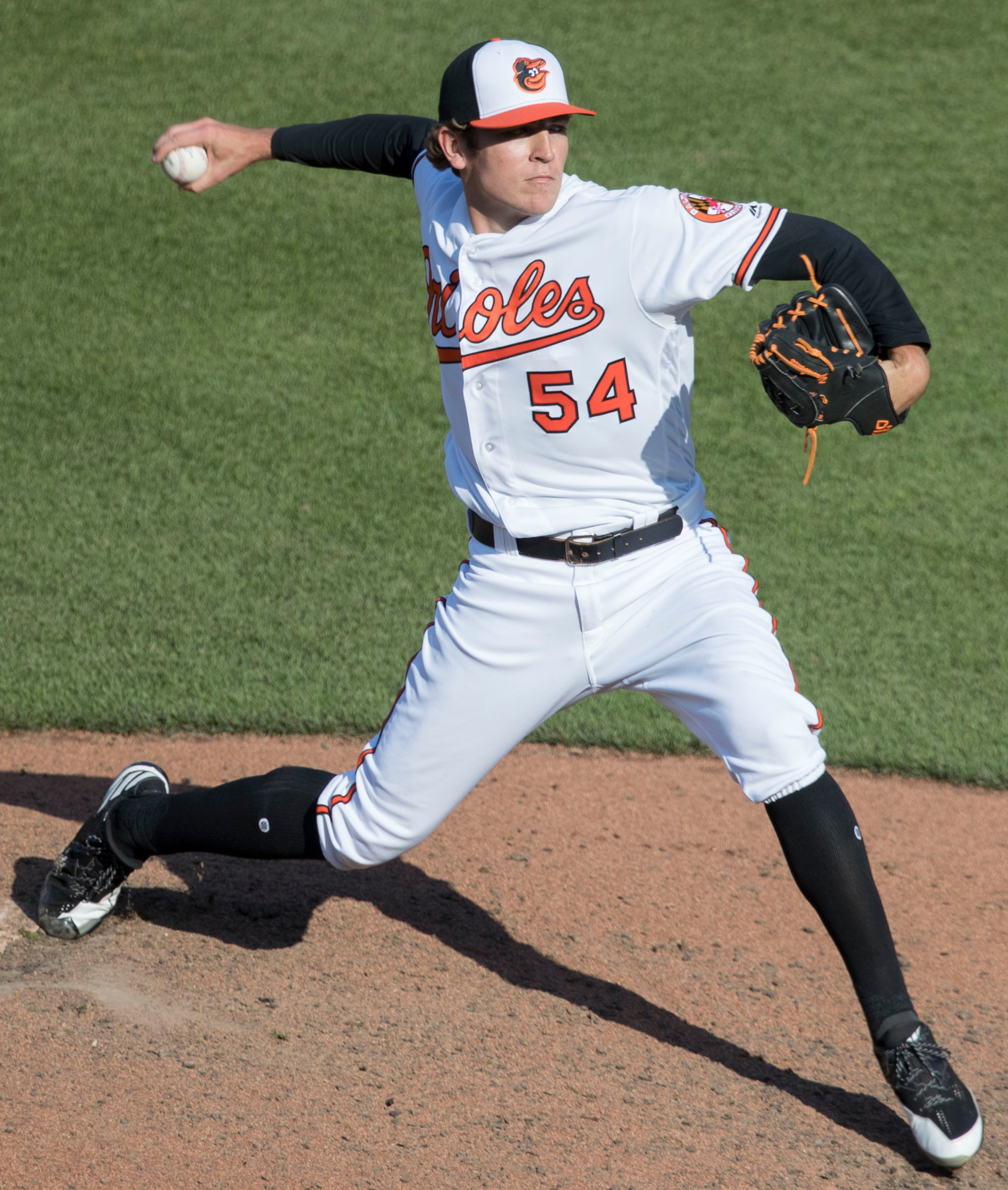
Yacabonis with the Orioles in 2017

Yacabonis was called up to the majors for the first time on June 11, 2017. As he had difficulty finding the strike zone in his first three June 2017 appearances with the Orioles, he was sent back to Norfolk — where as closer he turned in a 0.93 ERA and 0.99 WHIP. He was recalled from Norfolk on July 2, 2017, likely to work in middle relief during his second call-up for the Orioles. He attributes his success in 2017 to his command of a certain pitch. As he says:

I throw predominantly a two-seam fastball, so I feel like a lot of the time the ball might be looking like it’s a fat pitch and then the late movement out of the zone allows me to get that weak contact or sometimes even a swing through and a miss.

In his first up after being called back from Norfolk, Yacabonis shut down the Milwaukee Brewers on July 3, 2017, for 3.1 innings. He allowed just one run on three hits, striking out two batters. Of his contribution in the game after being sent back down, Showalter said, ". . Yac was the key. . . we sent him down to get stretched out a little bit and work on some things, shorten up the breaking ball a little bit, and he presented himself well."

Yacabonis knocked in the only Orioles' run in the 8–1 loss by grounding out to second base, which scored Rubén Tejada from third in the third inning. He was optioned to Triple-A Norfolk the next day. Yacabonis was recalled September 1, 2017, coming in that day in a scoreless game against the Toronto Blue Jays in the top of 13th inning. He shut down the side to get his first major league win.

==== 2018 ====
After a strong spring training for Yacabonis, where he posted a 3.38 ERA over eight innings, the Orioles optioned him to Triple-A Norfolk March 22, 2018, with the possible intent of developing him into a starting pitcher. Yacabonis had refined his mechanics to take stress off his throwing shoulder. Yacabonis was called up from Triple-A Norfolk to cover the Orioles bullpen April 7, 2018, after the previous night's 14-inning game with the Yankees required nine innings of relief pitching. He was sent back down to Triple-A Norfolk on April 8, 2018, with left-handed pitcher Tanner Scott being called up from there. Yacabonis gave up three earned runs in one inning against the Yankees.

Yacabonis was called up from Triple-A Norfolk prior to a May 11 game against Tampa Bay to provide another bullpen arm for the four-game series. After being sent down again to work on his command, he was recalled on June 27 and made his first Major League Baseball career start a day later against the Seattle Mariners. Through seven interim starts with disruption in Norfolk, Yacabonis had posted a 1.99 ERA with a 0.884 WHIP. He had a 3.14 ERA overall in Triple-A through that point in the season. He was called up by the Orioles later in the season. He finished the season with a 0–2 record in seven starts (12 games).

==== 2019 ====
In 2019 for the Orioles, Yacabonis pitched to a 1–2 record and a 6.80 ERA over 29 games. Yacabonis was designated for assignment by the Orioles on August 14, 2019. He became a free agent following the season on November 4.

=== San Diego Padres ===
On December 19, 2019, Yacabonis signed a minor league deal with the San Diego Padres. Yacabonis did not play in a game for the Padres in 2020 due to the cancellation of the minor league season because of the COVID-19 pandemic.

=== Seattle Mariners ===
On August 19, 2020, Yacabonis was traded to the Seattle Mariners in exchange for cash considerations. On September 9, Yacabonis was selected to the active roster. Yacabonis was designated for assignment by the Mariners on September 15. He elected free agency on October 14, 2020. On December 29, 2020, Yacabonis re-signed with the Mariners organization on a minor league contract. After appearing in 24 games for the Triple-A Tacoma Rainiers, posting a 1.72 ERA with 29 strikeouts, Yacabonis had his contract selected on August 28, 2021, by the Mariners. On August 30, Yacabonis was designated for assignment by the Mariners without making an appearance. On September 2, Yacabonis cleared waivers and was assigned outright to Triple-A Tacoma. On October 13, Yacabonis elected free agency.

=== Miami Marlins ===
On March 12, 2022, Yacabonis signed a minor league contract with the Miami Marlins. On June 15, the Marlins selected Yacabonis' contract. He was designated for assignment on July 30, 2022.

=== Tampa Bay Rays ===
On August 4, 2022, the Tampa Bay Rays claimed Yacabonis off waivers from the Marlins. In 5 appearances, he struggled to an 11.57 ERA with 6 strikeouts in 4 2/3 innings pitched. On August 18, Yacabonis was designated for assignment. He cleared waivers and was sent outright to the Triple–A Durham Bulls on August 20. In eight games for Durham, he registered a 3.00 ERA with 8 strikeouts. On October 4, Yacabonis was selected back to the active roster after Kevin Herget was designated for assignment. On November 10, Yacabonis was removed from the 40-man roster and sent outright to Triple–A. He elected free agency the same day.

=== New York Mets ===
On December 1, 2022, Yacabonis signed a minor league deal with the New York Mets. He was assigned to the Triple-A Syracuse Mets to begin the 2023 season. He made 4 scoreless appearances for Syracuse before having his contract selected to the active roster on April 15, 2023. Yacabonis pitched in 5 games for the Mets, logging a 2–1 record and 9.00 ERA with 8 strikeouts in 9.0 innings of work. On May 9, he was placed on the injured list with a left quad strain. On May 30, Yacabonis was activated from the injured list and subsequently designated for assignment. He cleared waivers and was sent outright to Triple-A Syracuse on June 2. On August 5, Yacabonis was selected back to the major league roster. After allowing one run in 4 2/3 innings, he was designated for assignment again on August 12. Yacabonis again cleared waivers and was sent outright to Syracuse on August 14. The following day, Yacabonis declined the assignment and instead elected free agency.

=== Long Island Ducks ===
On September 5, 2023, Yacabonis signed with the Long Island Ducks of the Atlantic League of Professional Baseball. In 4 appearances for Long Island, Yacabonis posted a 9.00 ERA with 4 strikeouts across 4 innings pitched.

=== Diablos Rojos del México ===
On April 11, 2024, Yacabonis signed with the Diablos Rojos del México of the Mexican League. In 38 relief appearances during the 2024 season, he compiled a 4–1 record with a 4.60 ERA and 38 strikeouts over 43 innings pitched. Yacabonis contributed to the Diablos' successful campaign, culminating in the team's 17th league championship title after sweeping the Sultanes de Monterrey in the Serie del Rey.

Yacabonis made 23 appearances for the Diablos during the 2025 season, registering a 3-0 record and 3.30 ERA with 25 strikeouts over 30 innings of relief. With the team, Yacabonis won his second consecutive Serie del Rey.

== Player profile ==
Yacabonis is a right-handed pitcher known for a high-velocity fastball and a sharp-breaking slider, which have been the foundation of his success as a reliever. His fastball typically sits in the 94–96 mph range, with occasional spikes to 98 mph. He complements it with a mid-80s slider that generates swings and misses, particularly against right-handed hitters.

Early in his MLB career, Yacabonis experimented with developing a changeup and a two-seam fastball to increase his viability as a multi-inning reliever or spot starter. While his command was inconsistent at times, especially with runners on base, he has been praised for his work ethic and adaptability on the mound.

Yacabonis has largely served as a middle reliever in both Major League and international competition, occasionally stepping into high-leverage situations. His durability and ability to eat innings out of the bullpen have made him a valuable asset for teams seeking depth in their relief corps.
