= Wander Suero =

Dominican baseball player (born 1991)

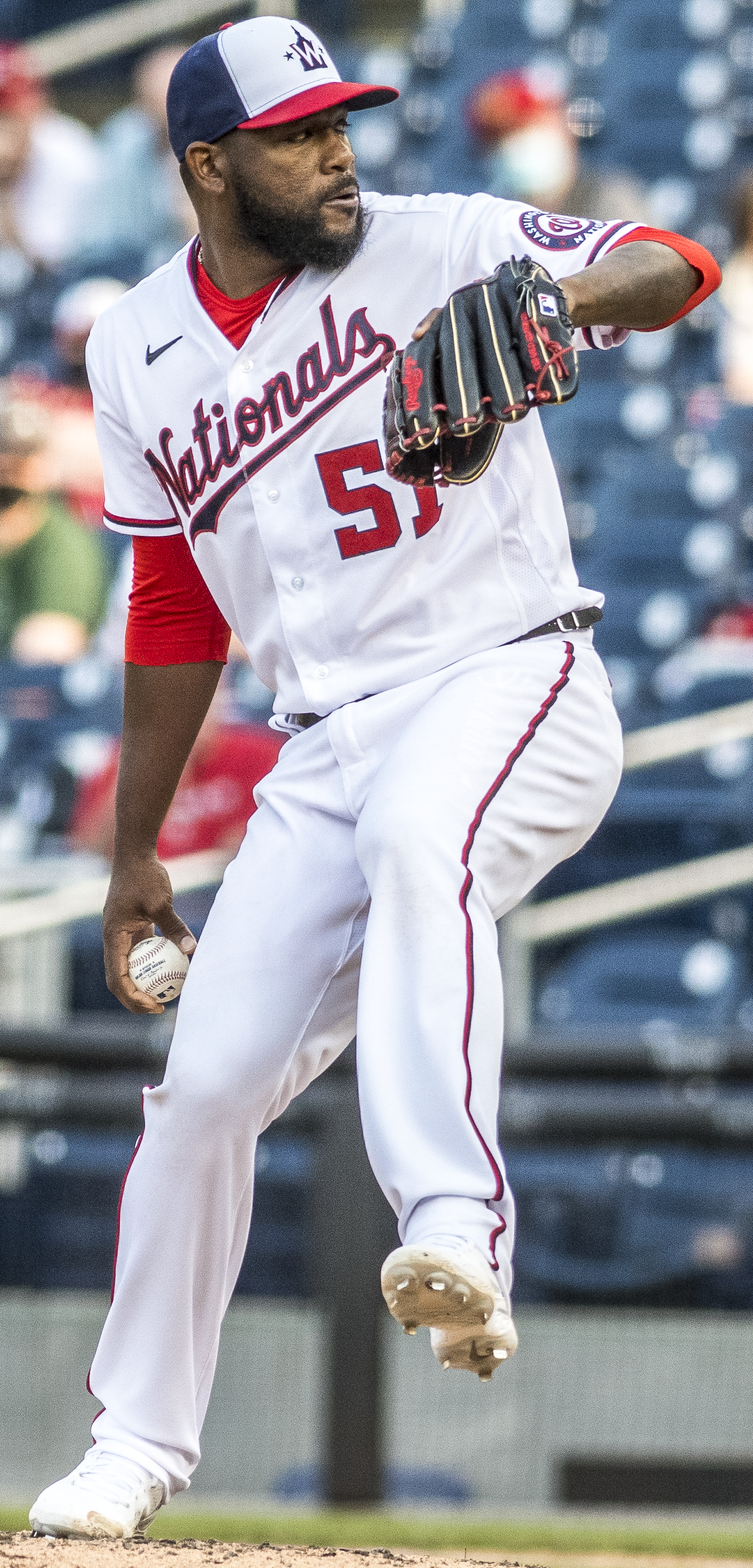
- Suero with the Washington Nationals in 2021

Free agent
- Pitcher
- Born: September 15, 1991 (age 35); Sabana Larga, Elías Piña, Dominican Republic
- Bats: Right Throws: Right

MLB debut
- May 1, 2018, for the Washington Nationals

MLB statistics (through 2025 season)
- Win–loss record: 15–14
- Earned run average: 4.96
- Strikeouts: 216
- Stats at Baseball Reference

Teams
- Washington Nationals (2018–2021); Los Angeles Dodgers (2023); Houston Astros (2024); Atlanta Braves (2025)

Career highlights and awards
- World Series champion (2019)

Wander Suero Montero (born September 15, 1991) is a Dominican professional baseball pitcher who is a free agent. He has previously played in Major League Baseball (MLB) for the Washington Nationals, Los Angeles Dodgers, Houston Astros, and Atlanta Braves. He won the 2019 World Series with the Nationals.

== Professional career ==
=== Washington Nationals ===
==== 2010–2015 ====
The Washington Nationals signed Suero as a non-drafted free agent in May 2010. He spent three seasons in Washington's player development system in the Dominican Republic, pitching for the Dominican Summer League Nationals from 2010 through 2012. In 2010, he started four games and appeared in relief 11 times, finishing the season with a record of 2–3, an earned run average (ERA) of 4.72, and 39 strikeouts and 23 walks in 34 1/3 innings. In 2011, he posted a record of 3–2 and an ERA of 5.49 with 41 strikeouts and 26 walks, pitching 39 1/3 innings in two starts and 14 relief appearances, while in 2012 he appeared in nine games, starting eight of them, and pitched 37 innings, with a record of 4–2 and an ERA of 3.41, striking out 34 batters and walking 12.

Suero moved up to the Rookie-level Gulf Coast League, playing for the Gulf Coast League Nationals, then based at the Nationals' spring training home at Space Coast Stadium in Viera, Florida, in 2013. That season, the Gulf Coast League Nationals finished their regular season with a record of 49–9, and their .845 winning percentage was the highest winning percentage for a full regular season ever achieved by a minor-league baseball team based in the United States. The Nationals then won all three of their playoff games, defeating the Gulf Coast League Pirates in a single-game semifinal playoff and sweeping the Gulf Coast League Red Sox in the best-of-three league championship series, to become the 2013 Gulf Coast League champions. During the championship season, Suero appeared in 13 games, starting three of them, and posted an 8–1 record, with an ERA of 1.65, 46 strikeouts, and 13 walks in 49 innings of work.

Suero was promoted to the High-A Potomac Nationals in the Carolina League to begin the 2014 season and struck out 21 batters, but walked 10 and pitched to an ERA of 7.57 in 27 1/3 innings of relief. Demoted to the Single-A Hagerstown Suns in the South Atlantic League, he finished the season there, pitching 72 innings, striking out 62 batters, walking only 11, and posting an ERA of 2.13 in six starts and 11 relief appearances, giving him an overall ERA of 3.62 for the year with 83 strikeouts and 21 walks. Promoted to the Double-A Harrisburg Senators of the Eastern League to begin the 2015 season, he again struggled, striking out 29 but walking 14, with a 6.35 ERA over 34 innings of relief in his first taste of the high minor leagues. Demoted to Potomac, he pitched 56 innings there in five starts and 11 relief appearances with 39 strikeouts, 18 walks, and an ERA of 2.41, and his ERA for the 2015 season as a whole was 3.90 with an overall total of 68 strikeouts and 32 walks.

During the 2015–16 offseason, Suero played in the Dominican Winter League, making two relief appearances for the Tigres del Licey. He pitched 1 2/3 innings and had an ERA of 5.40 with a strikeout and no walks.

==== 2016–2017 ====
Suero was a non-roster invitee to major league spring training before the 2016 season. He spent the entire 2016 season with Double-A Harrisburg, his performance much improved from his time there the previous year; he posted a 2.44 ERA on the season, pitching 55 1/3 innings in 39 relief appearances with 48 strikeouts and 21 walks. He pitched for Tigres del Licey in the Dominican Winter League again during the 2016-2017 offseason, and his performance improved there as well: In 13 relief appearances, he pitched 14 1/3 scoreless innings, with 10 strikeouts and only four walks.

He was again invited to major league spring training as a non-roster pitcher before the 2017 season. Returning to Harrisburg as the 2017 season began, Suero had a 1.96 ERA and 10 saves in 23 innings of relief, and he quickly earned a promotion to the Triple-A Syracuse Chiefs of the International League for the first time on June 2, 2017. He collected his first Triple-A save on June 14, 2017, against the Pawtucket Red Sox. The Washington Post described Suero among the bright spots of an 87-loss season for the Chiefs in 2017, as he put up a 1.70 ERA across 36 games with the Chiefs after his promotion. The Nationals awarded Suero as their Minor League Pitcher of the Year. He told a Mid-Atlantic Sports Network reporter that his goal was to work hard over the winter to prove to the organization his readiness to pitch in the major leagues.

The Nationals added Suero to their 40-man roster after the 2017 season. His addition protected him in advance of the Rule 5 draft that December. It also placed him in contention for a spot on the Nationals' major league roster in the 2018 season. He pitched for Tigres del Licey in the Dominican Winter League again during the 2017-2018 offseason, but with less success, with five strikeouts, six walks, and an ERA of 7.56 in 8 1/3 innings of work over nine relief appearances.

==== 2018 ====
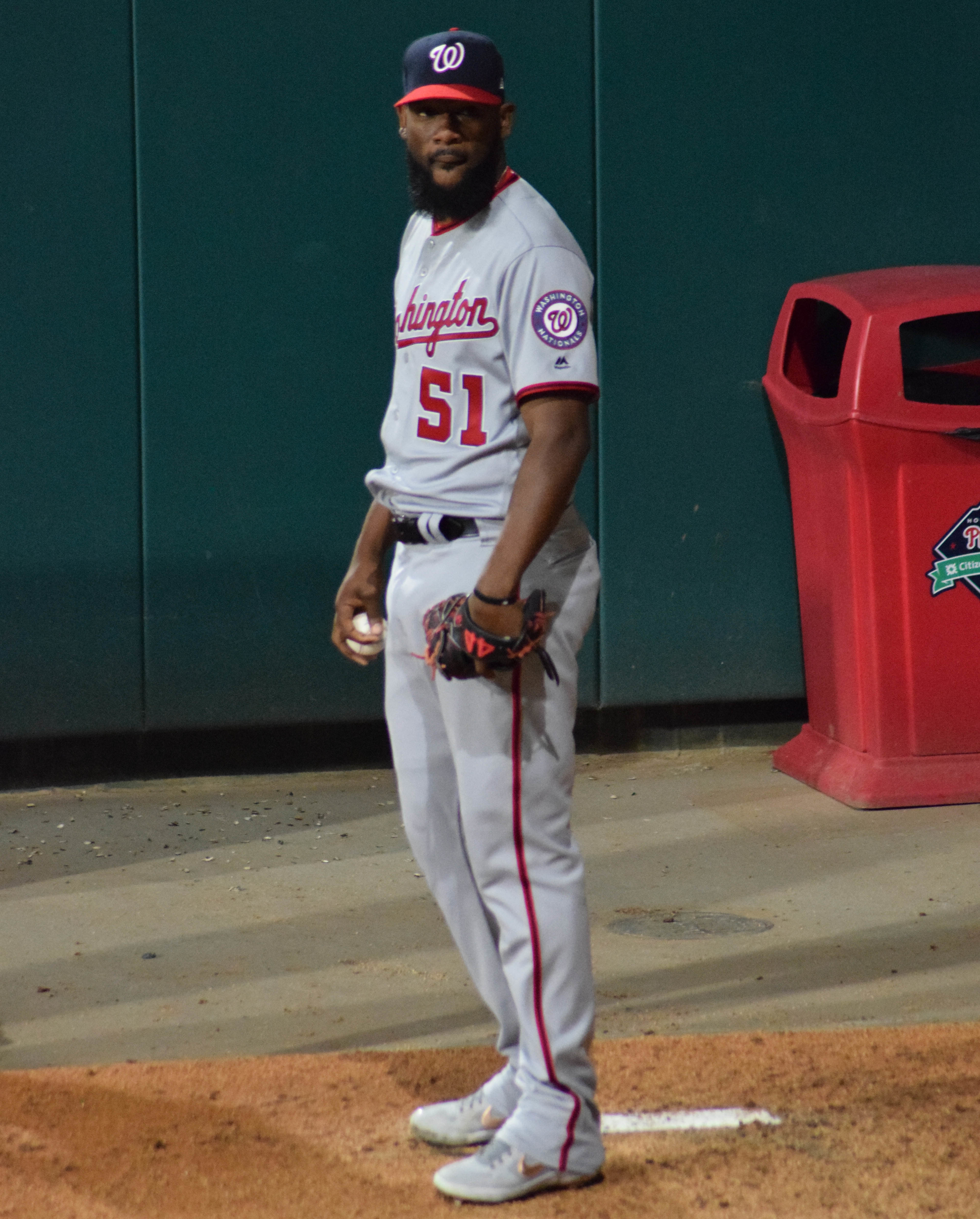
Suero in 2019

Suero began spring training in 2018 by pitching four scoreless innings with seven strikeouts and no walks, but he suffered an oblique strain during a Grapefruit League game on March 9. He was shut down for three weeks before he resumed throwing at the Nationals′ spring training complex at FITTEAM Ballpark of the Palm Beaches in West Palm Beach, Florida, and he did not make his debut with Syracuse until April 21, issuing no walks but allowing three runs on five hits in one inning of work. He improved rapidly after that: In his next three appearances with the Chiefs, he pitched a combined three innings, giving up no runs or walks, dropping his ERA for the season from 27.00 after his first appearance to 6.75.

On April 30, the Nationals called Suero up to the major leagues for the first time to reinforce Washington's bullpen with middle-relief strength. He had played in 212 minor-league games over eight seasons before his first major-league call-up. He made his major-league debut on May 1 in a game against the Pittsburgh Pirates at Nationals Park in Washington, D.C., entering the game in relief of starter Max Scherzer with one out in the seventh inning and Washington leading 12–2. He threw 15 pitches and gave up two singles to the first two batters he faced, third baseman Colin Moran and shortstop Jordy Mercer, but then got second baseman Max Moroff to pop out to the shortstop and right fielder Adam Frazier to fly out to center field to complete both the inning and his first major league appearance without surrendering any runs. He notched his first major-league strikeout in his second major-league appearance on May 4, fanning pinch-hitter Jesmuel Valentín as part of a 1 2/3-inning performance in which he did not allow a base runner during a 7–3 Nationals victory over the Philadelphia Phillies. Suero had appeared in 12 games for Washington, posting an ERA of 4.15 with 11 strikeouts and five walks in 13 innings of work, when the Nationals optioned him to Syracuse on June 9, but they recalled him to the major leagues on June 10.

On the afternoon of June 18, 2018, the Nationals resumed a game at Nationals Park against the New York Yankees that had been suspended due to rain on May 15 after 5 1/2 innings with the score tied 3–3. Suero pitched the top of the sixth inning on May 15 and thus was the pitcher of record when, in the bottom of the sixth on June 18, the Nationals took the lead for good on a two-run homer by Juan Soto. He also pitched the first third of an inning in the top of the seventh, giving up a hit and striking out two in 1 1/3 innings of work spread across five weeks, and he came away from the game with his first major-league decision, a win retroactively credited to him as of May 15. Suero also appeared in a full game against the Yankees on the evening of June 18—a makeup game for a rainout on May 16—pitching an inning and walking a batter who later scored. He had pitched 17 1/3 innings in 15 major-league appearances on the season, posting a 3.63 ERA, striking out 16, and walking six, when the Nationals optioned him to Syracuse on June 19 to make room on their roster for newly acquired reliever Kelvin Herrera.

==== 2019–2020 ====
Suero was Washington's most used reliever during the 2019 season; he led the team in games pitched and relief innings. He recorded his first Major League save on June 21, 2019, at Nationals Park. Suero was left off Washington's roster to start the 2019 National League Championship Series, placed on the roster when Daniel Hudson went on paternity leave and then removed again when Hudson returned. Suero appeared in the 2019 World Series in three different games and retired all five batters he faced. He was the only pitcher to appear in the series and not allow any baserunners.

In the pandemic-shortened 2020 season, Suero posted a 2–0 record with a 3.80 ERA while recording 28 strikeouts in 23 2/3 innings over 22 games. On November 30, 2021, Suero was non-tendered by the Nationals, making him a free agent.

=== Los Angeles Angels ===
On March 31, 2022, Suero signed a minor league contract with the Los Angeles Angels. In 20 relief appearances for the Triple–A Salt Lake Bees, he struggled to a 6.08 ERA with 15 strikeouts and 2 saves in 23 2/3 innings pitched. Suero was released by the Angels organization on July 8.

=== Sultanes de Monterrey ===
On July 14, 2022, Suero signed with the Sultanes de Monterrey of the Mexican League. He appeared in seven games for Monterrey, recording a 1–1 record and 2.84 ERA with eight strikeouts in 6 1/3 innings pitched. Suero was released by the team on January 11, 2023.

=== Los Angeles Dodgers ===
On January 23, 2023, Suero signed a minor league contract with the Los Angeles Dodgers. He was assigned to the Triple-A Oklahoma City Dodgers to begin the year, making 47 appearances and logging a 3.26 ERA with eight strikeouts and 17 saves in 49 2/3 innings pitched. On May 5, he had his contract selected to the active roster. He pitched 6 2/3 innings for the Dodgers over four games and allowed six earned runs before he was designated for assignment on May 22. He cleared waivers and was sent outright to Triple-A on May 25. Suero was added back to the major league roster on September 10 where he made one more appearance, allowing one run in 1 1/3 innings. Following the season on October 19, Suero was removed from the 40–man roster and sent outright to Triple–A Oklahoma City. However, Suero subsequently rejected the assignment and elected free agency.

=== Houston Astros ===
On December 7, 2023, Suero signed a minor league contract with the Houston Astros. He began the 2024 season with the Triple–A Sugar Land Space Cowboys of the Pacific Coast League (PCL), and made four appearances for the affiliate prior to his promotion. On April 9, 2024, Suero had his contract selected to the major league roster. He made one appearance for the Astros against the Kansas City Royals, allowing an unearned run on walk–off hit by Salvador Pérez. Suero was designated for assignment by Houston on April 12. He cleared waivers and was sent outright to Triple–A on April 15.

Suero remained in Sugar Land the rest of the 2024 season, accumulating a 7–1 record, 2.66 ERA, 37 saves, 67 1/3 innings pitched, 71 strikeouts, and a 1.197 walks plus hits per inning pitched (WHIP). Named a Triple-A All-Star, his 37 saves established the franchise record, as well as the PCL record. Sugar Land won a minor league-best 93 games, the PCL championship, and the Triple-A National Championship Game, also both the first championships of their respective types for Sugar Land. Suero elected free agency on October 10.

=== Atlanta Braves ===
On December 12, 2024, Suero signed a minor league contract with the Atlanta Braves. He made 33 appearances for the Triple-A Gwinnett Stripers, posting an 0–2 record and 1.50 ERA with 49 strikeouts and 11 saves over 36 innings of work. On July 11, 2025, the Braves selected Suero's contract, adding him to their active roster. In five appearances for Atlanta, he struggled to an 11.37 ERA with seven strikeouts across 6 1/3 innings pitched. On September 2, Suero was designated for assignment by the Braves.

=== New York Mets ===
On September 4, 2025, Suero was claimed off waivers by the New York Mets. Suero did not make any appearances for the organization before he was designated for assignment on September 9. He cleared waivers and was sent outright to the Triple-A Syracuse Mets on September 11. On September 18, the Mets selected Suero's contract, adding him to their active roster. He did not appear for the team before being designated for assignment on September 20. Suero cleared waivers and was sent outright to Syracuse on September 22. He elected free agency on October 6.

=== Athletics ===
On November 20, 2025, Suero signed a minor league contract with the Athletics. In 51 games with Triple-A Las Vegas Aviators he threw 53.2 innings of relief going 5-4 with a 7.04 ERA with 47 strikeouts and 4 saves. He elected free agency on November 2.
