= DJ Stewart =

American baseball player (born 1993)

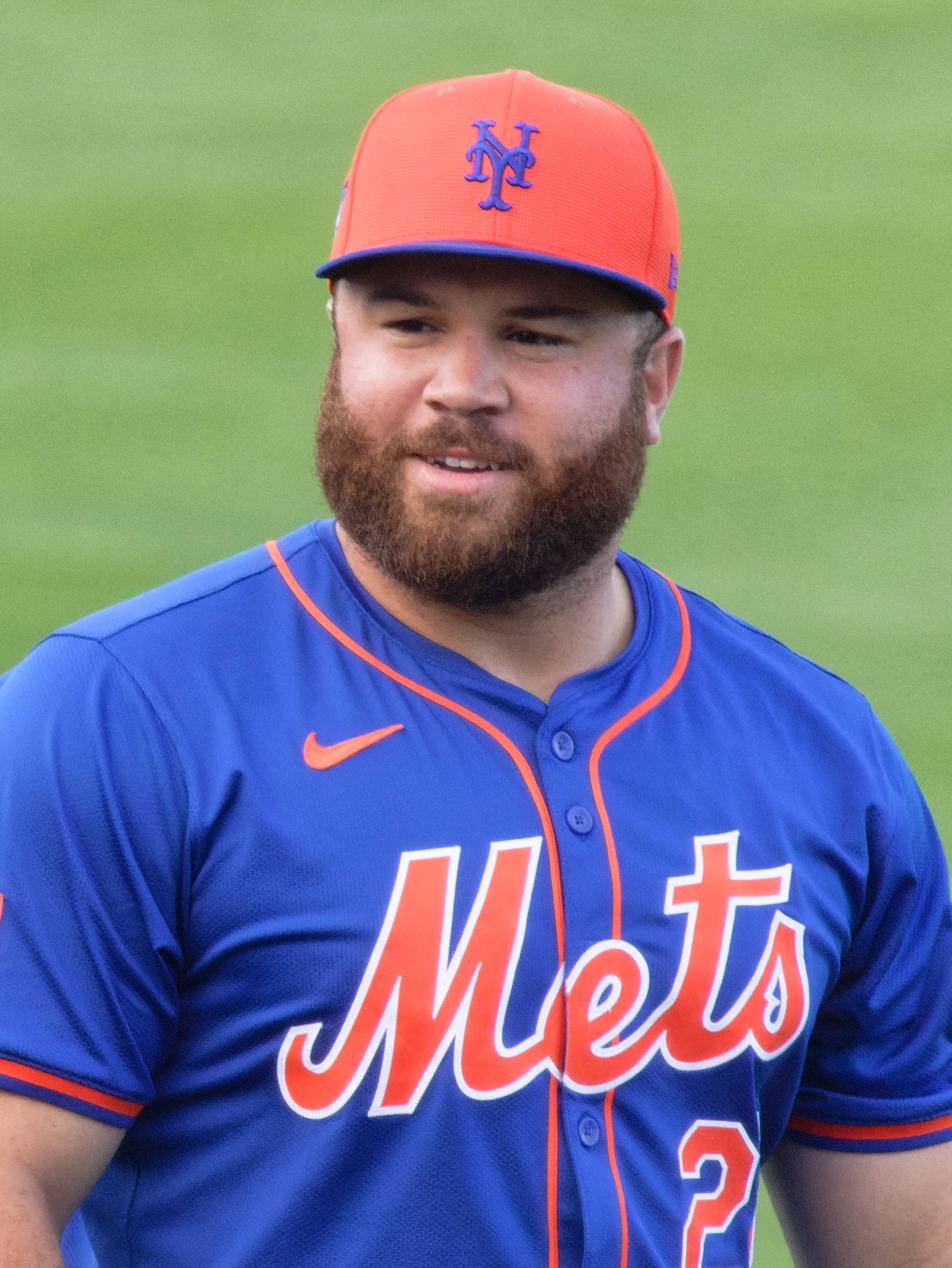
- Stewart with the Mets in 2024
- Outfielder
- Born: November 30, 1993 (age 32); Gainesville, Florida, U.S.
- Batted: Left Threw: Right

MLB debut
- September 12, 2018, for the Baltimore Orioles

Last MLB appearance
- September 10, 2024, for the New York Mets

MLB statistics
- Batting average: .212
- Home runs: 42
- Runs batted in: 118
- Stats at Baseball Reference

Teams
- Baltimore Orioles (2018–2022); New York Mets (2023–2024)

Demetrius Jerome Stewart (born November 30, 1993) is an American former professional baseball outfielder. He played in Major League Baseball (MLB) for the Baltimore Orioles and New York Mets. He made his MLB debut in 2018. Stewart played college baseball for the Florida State Seminoles.

== Amateur career ==
Stewart attended The Bolles School in Jacksonville, Florida. He played both baseball and football in high school. Stewart was drafted by the New York Yankees in the 28th round of the 2012 Major League Baseball draft. He was teammates in high school with Hayden Hurst and Austin Slater. He did not sign with the Yankees and enrolled at Florida State University to play college baseball for the Florida State Seminoles.

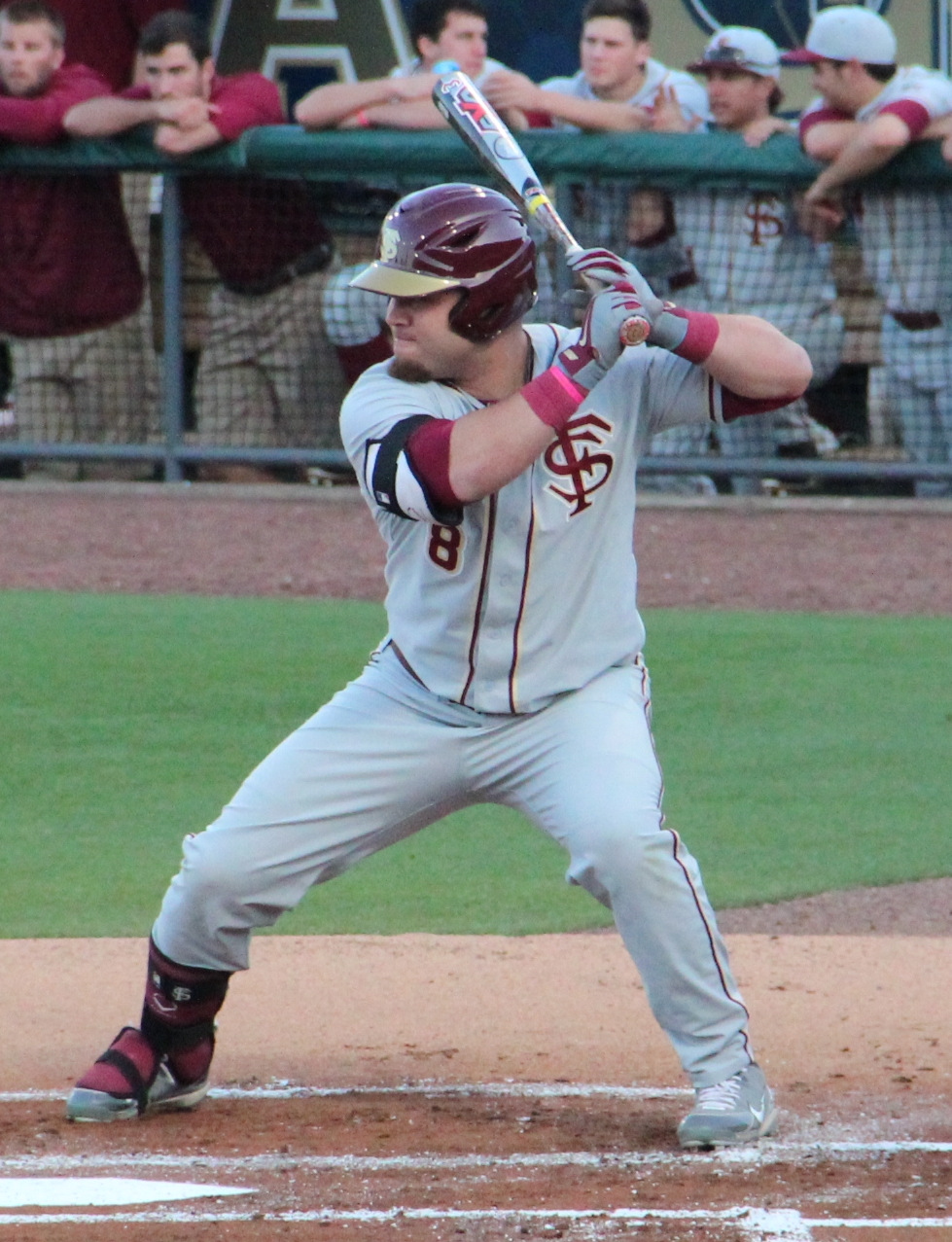
Stewart with the Florida State Seminoles in 2014

As a freshman in 2013, Stewart played in 60 games, leading the team in hits (82), batting average (.364), doubles (25) and slugging percentage (.560). He also added five home runs and 59 runs batted in (RBIs). In 2013, he played collegiate summer baseball in the Cape Cod Baseball League for the Yarmouth–Dennis Red Sox and was named a League All-Star.

As a sophomore in 2014, Stewart was named the Atlantic Coast Conference Baseball Player of the Year after batting .351/.472/.557 with seven home runs and 50 RBIs. He was also named an All-American by the American Baseball Coaches Association (ABCA). In March, he received a four-game suspension for his role in triggering a brawl between the Seminoles and the Florida Gators. After the season, he played for the United States collegiate national team during the summer.

== Professional career ==
=== Baltimore Orioles ===
The Baltimore Orioles selected Stewart in the first round, with the 25th overall selection, in the 2015 Major League Baseball draft. Stewart signed with the Orioles, receiving a $2,064,500 signing bonus. He spent 2015 with the Aberdeen IronBirds, where he batted .218 with six home runs and 24 RBIs. Stewart spent the 2016 season with both the Delmarva Shorebirds and the Frederick Keys, where he batted a combined .254 with ten home runs and 55 RBIs between both clubs. In 2017, he played for the Bowie Baysox, where he posted a .278 batting average, 21 home runs, 79 RBIs, and 20 stolen bases.

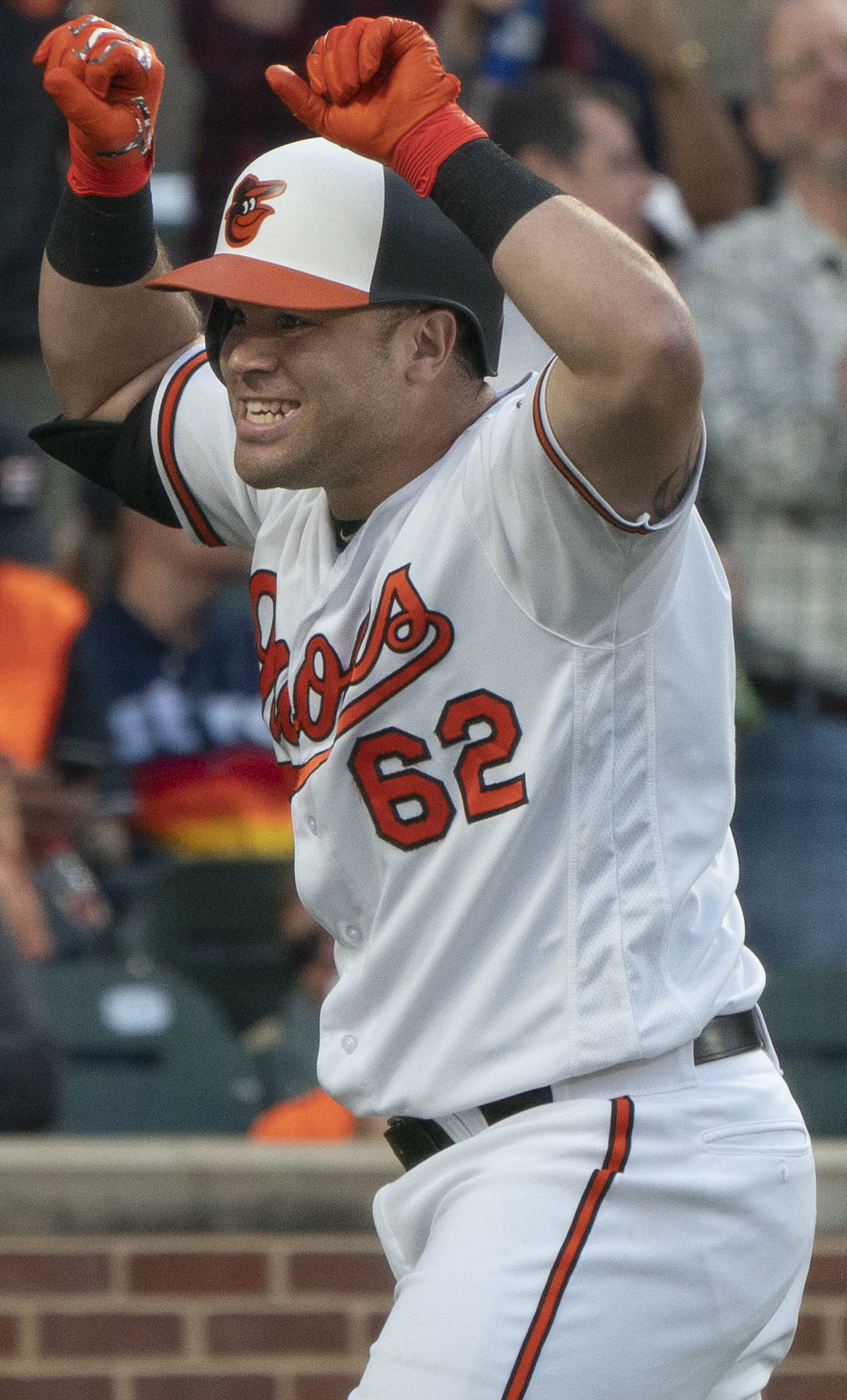
Stewart with the Orioles in 2018

On September 11, 2018, Stewart was promoted to the major leagues for the first time. He made his major league debut the next day against the Oakland Athletics. On September 19, he hit his first major league home run, off of Toronto Blue Jays pitcher Marco Estrada. Stewart played in 17 games for the Orioles in 2018, batting .250/.340/.550 with 3 home runs and 10 RBI.

Stewart began the 2019 season in Triple-A with the Norfolk Tides, but was recalled to the majors on May 28, 2019, after slashing .316/.425/.586 with 8 home runs. On August 6, while attempting to field a fly ball hit by Mike Ford of the New York Yankees, Stewart dove too early and was struck on the side of the head by the ball, suffering a concussion and being replaced in the game by Jace Peterson. Across 44 games for the Orioles in 2019, Stewart batted .238/.317/.381 with 4 home runs and 15 RBI.

In 2020 for the Orioles, Stewart slashed .193/.355/.432 with 7 home runs and 15 RBIs in 31 games. In 2021, he slashed .204/.324/.374 with 12 home runs and 33 RBIs in 100 games.

Stewart went 0-for-3 in three games in the 2022 season before he was designated for assignment on April 19. On April 26, Stewart cleared waivers and was sent outright to Triple-A Norfolk. Appearing in 29 games for Norfolk to round out the year, he slashed .256/.391/.488 with 6 home runs and 17 RBI. He elected free agency following the season on November 10.

=== New York Mets ===
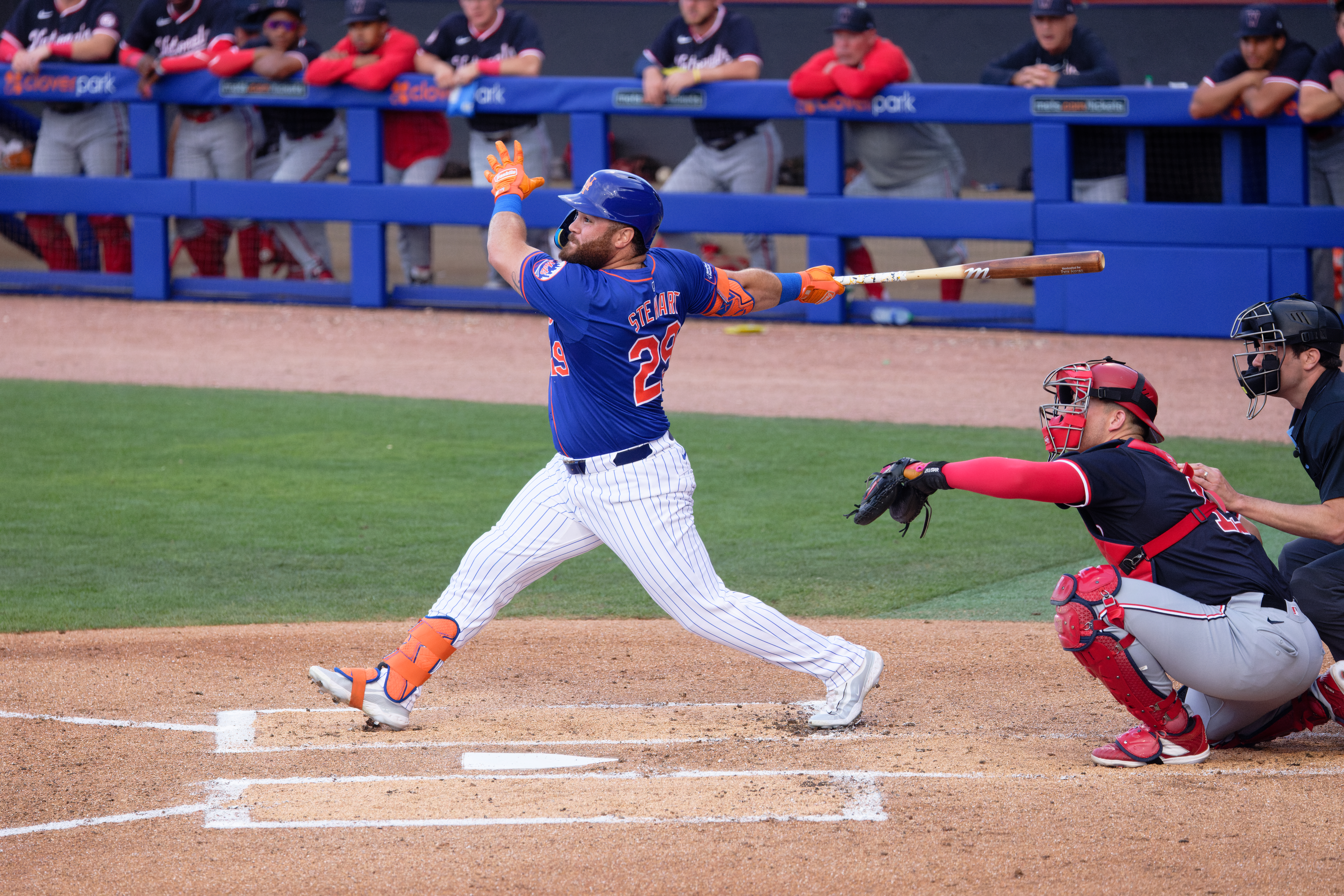
Stewart with the Mets in 2024

On February 2, 2023, Stewart signed a minor league contract with the New York Mets organization, based at least in part on his experience with Mets manager Buck Showalter while he was manager of the Orioles. He began the 2023 season with the Triple–A Syracuse Mets, playing in 51 games and hitting .229/.362/.516 with 16 home runs and 41 RBI. On July 4, Stewart was selected to the major league roster. In 58 games for New York, he batted .244/.333/.506 with 11 home runs and 26 RBI.

Stewart played in 74 games for the Mets in 2024, slashing .177/.325/.297 with 5 home runs and 19 RBI. On November 4, 2024, he was removed from the 40-man roster and sent outright to Triple–A Syracuse. Stewart elected free agency two days later.

=== Pittsburgh Pirates ===
On January 11, 2025, Stewart signed a minor league contract with the Pittsburgh Pirates. In 45 appearances for the Triple-A Indianapolis Indians, he batted .125/.245/.257 with five home runs and 20 RBI. Stewart was released by the Pirates organization on June 24.

== Personal life ==
Stewart's father, Reggie, was selected by the San Diego Padres in the 13th round of the 1991 Major League Baseball draft and played a few seasons of minor league and independent baseball.
