= 2020 Toronto Blue Jays season =

2020 Toronto Blue Jays
- American League Wild Card
- League: American League
- Division: East
- Ballpark: Sahlen Field (temporary)
- City: Buffalo, New York (temporary)
- Record: 32–28 (.533)
- Divisional place: 3rd
- Owners: Rogers, CEO Mark Shapiro
- General managers: Ross Atkins
- Managers: Charlie Montoyo
- Television: Sportsnet; Sportsnet One (Dan Shulman, Buck Martinez, Pat Tabler)
- Radio: Blue Jays Radio Network; Sportsnet 590 the FAN (Ben Wagner, Mike Wilner, Kevin Barker)

The 2020 Toronto Blue Jays season was the franchise's 44th season in Major League Baseball.

On March 12, 2020, MLB announced that because of the ongoing COVID-19 pandemic (including in Toronto), the start of the regular season would be delayed by at least two weeks in addition to the remainder of spring training being cancelled. Four days later, it was announced that the start of the season would be pushed back indefinitely due to the recommendation made by the U.S. Centers for Disease Control and Prevention to restrict events of more than 50 people for eight weeks.

On June 23, commissioner Rob Manfred unilaterally implemented a 60-game season. Players were to report to training camps on July 1 in order to resume spring training and prepare for a July 23 or 24 Opening Day. The team was forced to play their home games in the home of their AAA affiliate in Buffalo, New York.

Due to the pandemic and the shortened season, Major League Baseball instituted certain rule changes which included the use of a universal designated hitter, a runner on second base to start extra innings, and a revised schedule. On July 30, the league and the union agreed that all remaining doubleheaders on the season would be seven innings.

On September 24, the Blue Jays clinched a playoff berth for the first time since 2016, and on the next day they clinched their first winning season since 2016 as well. As the eighth seed in the expanded playoff format, they faced the top-seeded Tampa Bay Rays in one of four 2020 American League Wild Card Series where they were swept 2–0 in the best-of-three series.

== Offseason ==
=== Rule changes ===
For the 2020 season, MLB instituted several new rule changes including the following:

- Single trade deadline – there will no longer be a waiver trade deadline later in the year.
- 26-man roster – rosters will expand from 25 players, but no team may carry more than 13 pitchers.
- Three-batter minimum for pitchers - a pitcher must face three batters in a game before they can be removed unless there is an injury or the end of an inning.

Further rule changes came into effect in response to the COVID-19 pandemic including the use of the DH in the National League, a shortened schedule, and starting extra innings with a runner at second base.

=== Transactions ===
==== October 2019 ====
- On October 29, the Blue Jays claimed RHP Anthony Bass off waivers from the Mariners, and designated RHP Ryan Dull for assignment.
- On October 30, the Blue Jays out righted Brock Stewart, Ryan Dull, and Buddy Boshers to Triple-A Buffalo.
- On October 31, RHP Clay Buchholz and 1B Justin Smoak elected free agency.

==== November 2019 ====
- On November 4, the Blue Jays acquired RHP Chase Anderson for 1B Chad Spanberger. RHP Ryan Tepera was designated for assignment and Devon Travis was out righted to Triple-A.
- On November 7, Devon Travis became a free agent.
- On November 11, Ryan Tepera cleared waivers and became a free agent.
- On November 20, the Blue Jays designated RHP Justin Shafer for assignment and out righted RHP Tim Mayza to Triple-A. In corresponding moves, the Blue Jays purchased the contracts of RHP Thomas Hatch and 2B Santiago Espinal from the minors.
- On November 25, the Blue Jays traded Justin Shafer to the Cincinnati Reds for cash considerations. The Jays also signed RHP A.J. Cole to a minor-league deal with an invitation to spring training.

==== December 2019 ====
- On December 1, the Blue Jays signed Phillippe Aumont and Justin Miller to minor-league deals with invites to spring training.
- On December 2, the Blue Jays non-tendered Jason Adam, Derek Law and Luke Maile who all elected to become free agents.
- On December 9, the Blue Jays purchased the contract of James Dykstra from the Southern Maryland Blue Crabs.
- On December 18, the Blue Jays signed Tanner Roark to a 2-year, $24 million contract.
- On December 27, the Blue Jays signed Hyun-jin Ryu to a 4-year, $80 million contract.
- On December 28, the Blue Jays signed Shun Yamaguchi to a 2-year, $6.35 million contract.
- On December 30, the Blue Jays signed Travis Shaw to a 1-year, $4 million contract. In a corresponding move, Richard Ureña was designated for assignment.

==== January 2020 ====
- On January 20, the Blue Jays signed several players to minor league contracts with invites to spring training, including Joe Panik, Ruben Tejada, and Caleb Joseph.

==== February 2020 ====
- On February 8, the Blue Jays signed free agent RHP Rafael Dolis and designated Breyvic Valera for assignment.
- On February 11, Jake Petricka was signed to a minor league deal with an invite to spring training.
- On February 24, the Blue Jays signed Marc Rzepcyznski to a minor league deal with an invite to spring training.

==== June 2020 ====
- On June 30, the Blue Jays placed INF Brandon Drury, OF Jonathan Davis, and RHP Elvis Luciano and Héctor Pérez on the 10-day injured list, most likely due to either positive COVID-19 tests or potential exposure to the virus.

==== July 2020 ====
- On July 2, the Blue Jays claimed INF Breyvic Valera off waivers and added him to the 60-man training camp roster, they also added RHP Bryan Baker, UTL Patrick Kivlehan, and OF Josh Palacios to the 60-man training camp list as the corresponding moves to the transactions on June 30.

== Spring training ==
The Blue Jays announced they would return to Montreal to finish their spring training for the seventh consecutive year. The opponents would have been the New York Yankees. However, spring training games, including the aforementioned series in Montreal, were cancelled due to the COVID-19 pandemic. On June 23, MLB announced the resumption of spring training on July 1.

== Home games ==
On July 18, the Canadian government denied approval for the Blue Jays to play their home games at Rogers Centre in Toronto, due to concerns surrounding repeated cross-border travel between the United States and Canada by teams involved in its games. With the Blue Jays denied permission to play in Toronto, this was the first season since 1968 (the year before the Montreal Expos were founded) to feature no regular season games played in Canada. After authorities in Pennsylvania rejected the Blue Jays' request to share PNC Park with the Pittsburgh Pirates, the Blue Jays struck an agreement to use Sahlen Field, home of their AAA affiliate Buffalo Bisons, for their home games. The first game in Buffalo took place on August 11; the Jays' "home" games prior to that date were scheduled to be played in their opponents' stadiums (though some of these were later postponed). Under MLB's health and safety protocols, all Blue Jays home games were held behind closed doors. The Jays were the first major league baseball team to play its home games in Buffalo, New York since the Buffalo Blues of the Federal League ceased operations in 1915.

== Regular season ==
=== Game log ===
==== Regular season ====
Legend
Blue Jays win	Blue Jays loss	Game postponed

2020 Game Log: 32–28 (Home: 17–13; Away: 15–15)
July: 3–4 (Home: 0–2; Road: 3–2)

#	Date	Opponent	Score	Win	Loss	Save	Record	GB
1	July 24	@ Rays	6–4	Romano (1–0)	Morton (0–1)	Giles (1)	1–0	—
2	July 25	@ Rays	1–4	Anderson (1–0)	Gaviglio (0–1)	Drake (1)	1–1	—
3	July 26	@ Rays	5–6 (10)	Roe (1–0)	Yamaguchi (0–1)	—	1–2	1
4	July 27	@ Nationals	4–1	Borucki (1–0)	Sánchez (0–1)	Bass (1)	2–2	1
5	July 28	@ Nationals	5–1	Roark (1–0)	Voth (0–1)	—	3–2	1
6	July 29	Nationals (Note: Blue Jays "home" game held at (or scheduled for) opponent's ballpark due to ongoing preparations at Sahlen Field.)	0–4 (10)	Hudson (1–0)	Yamaguchi (0–2)	—	3–3	1
7	July 30	Nationals	4–6	Harper (1–0)	Ryu (0–1)	Hudson (1)	3–4	2
—	July 31	Phillies	Postponed (COVID-19). Makeup date: August 20.					

August: 15–11 (Home: 8–5; Road: 7–6)

#	Date	Opponent	Score	Win	Loss	Save	Record	GB
—	August 1	Phillies	Postponed (COVID-19). Makeup date: August 20.					
—	August 2	Phillies	Postponed (COVID-19). Makeup date: September 18.					
8	August 4	@ Braves	1–10	Fried (2–0)	Shoemaker (0–1)	—	3–5	4½
9	August 5	@ Braves	2–1	Ryu (1–1)	Newcomb (0–1)	Bass (2)	4–5	4
10	August 6	@ Braves	3–4	Melancon (1–0)	Font (0–1)	—	4–6	4
11	August 7	@ Red Sox	3–5	Hembree (2–0)	Roark (1–1)	Workman (3)	4–7	4
12	August 8	@ Red Sox	2–1	Kay (1–0)	Walden (0–1)	Bass (3)	5–7	4
13	August 9	@ Red Sox	3–5	Barnes (1–1)	Hatch (0–1)	—	5–8	3½
14	August 11	Marlins	5–4 (10)	Cole (1–0)	Tarpley (2–1)	—	6–8	3½
15	August 12	Marlins	11–14 (10)	Kintzler (1–0)	Dolis (0–1)	Smith (1)	6–9	4½
16	August 14	Rays	12–4	Font (1–1)	Thompson (1–1)	—	7–9	4½
17	August 15	Rays	2–3	Loup (2–0)	Romano (1–1)	Anderson (3)	7–10	5½
18	August 16	Rays	5–7 (8)	Loup (3–0)	Font (1–2)	Slegers (1)	7–11	6½
19	August 17	@ Orioles	7–2	Ryu (2–1)	Cobb (1–2)	—	8–11	6½
20	August 18	@ Orioles	8–7 (10)	Bass (1–0)	Sulser (1–2)	—	9–11	5½
21	August 19	@ Orioles	5–2	Roark (2–1)	Milone (1–3)	Dolis (1)	10–11	4½
22	August 20	Phillies	3–2 (7)	Romano (2–1)	Guerra (1–3)	—	11–11	4
23	August 20	Phillies	9–8 (7)	Kay (2–0)	Neris (1–1)	Cole (1)	12–11	3½
24	August 21	@ Rays	6–5 (10)	Hatch (1–1)	Loup (3–1)	Romano (1)	13–11	2½
25	August 22	@ Rays	1–2 (10)	Banda (1–0)	Bass (1–1)	—	13–12	3½
26	August 23	@ Rays	4–5	Fleming (1–0)	Borucki (1–1)	Curtiss (1)	13–13	4½
27	August 24	@ Rays	6–4	Hatch (2–1)	Loup (3–2)	Romano (2)	14–13	3½
28	August 25	Red Sox	7–9	Valdéz (1–0)	Font (1–3)	Barnes (2)	14–14	4½
29	August 26	Red Sox	9–1	Yamaguchi (1–2)	Brewer (0–2)	—	15–14	4½
—	August 27	Red Sox	Postponed (Boycotts due to Jacob Blake shooting); Makeup date: September 4					
30	August 28	Orioles	5–4 (10)	Dolis (1–1)	Sulser (1–3)	—	16–14	4½
31	August 29	Orioles	5–0	Walker (3–2)	Cobb (1–3)	—	17–14	4½
32	August 30	Orioles	6–5	Bass (2–1)	Sulser (1–4)	—	18–14	4½
33	August 31	Orioles	3–4 (11)	Valdez (1–0)	Bass (2–2)	—	18–15	5½

September: 14–13 (Home: 9–6; Road: 5–7)

#	Date	Opponent	Score	Win	Loss	Save	Record	GB
34	September 1	@ Marlins	2–3	Hoyt (1–0)	Yamaguchi (1–3)	Kintzler (8)	18–16	5½
35	September 2	@ Marlins	2–1	Ryu (3–1)	Sánchez (1–1)	Bass (4)	19–16	5½
36	September 3	@ Red Sox	6–2 (10)	Dolis (2–1)	Valdéz (1–1)	—	20–16	5
37	September 4	@ Red Sox	8–7 (7)	Cole (2–0)	Godley (0–4)	Bass (5)	21–16	5
38	September 4	Red Sox (Note: Blue Jays "home" game held at opponent's ballpark due to rescheduling of postponed home games.)	2–3 (7)	Taylor (1–1)	Stripling (3–2)	Barnes (4)	21–17	5½
39	September 5	@ Red Sox	8–9	Kickham (1–0)	Bass (2–3)	—	21–18	5½
40	September 6	@ Red Sox	10–8	Hatch (3–1)	Hall (0–2)	Dolis (2)	22–18	5½
41	September 7	Yankees	12–7	Reid-Foley (1–0)	Ottavino (2–3)	—	23–18	4½
42	September 8	Yankees	2–1	Yamaguchi (2–3)	Happ (1–2)	Dolis (3)	24–18	3½
43	September 9	Yankees	2–7	García (1–1)	Stripling (3–3)	—	24–19	4
44	September 11	Mets	1–18	deGrom (4–1)	Anderson (0–1)	Ramírez (1)	24–20	4½
45	September 12	Mets	3–2	Ray (2–4)	Lugo (2–3)	Dolis (4)	25–20	4½
46	September 13	Mets	7–3	Ryu (4–1)	Peterson (4–2)	—	26–20	3½
47	September 15	@ Yankees	6–20	García (2–1)	Walker (3–3)	—	26–21	4½
48	September 16	@ Yankees	2–13	Cole (6–3)	Roark (2–2)	—	26–22	4½
49	September 17	@ Yankees	7–10	Tanaka (3–2)	Anderson (0–2)	Chapman (3)	26–23	6
50	September 18	Phillies	0–7 (7)	Eflin (3–2)	Ray (2–5)	—	26–24	6½
51	September 18	@ Phillies	7–8 (7)	Brogdon (1–0)	Dolis (2–2)	Neris (5)	26–25	7½
52	September 19	@ Phillies	1–3	Velasquez (1–1)	Ryu (4–2)	Hunter (1)	26–26	8½
53	September 20	@ Phillies	6–3	Walker (4–3)	Medina (0–1)	Bass (6)	27–26	7½
54	September 21	Yankees	11–5	Zeuch (1–0)	King (1–2)	—	28–26	7½
55	September 22	Yankees	1–12	Cole (7–3)	Roark (2–3)	—	28–27	7½
56	September 23	Yankees	14–1	Cole (3–0)	Tanaka (3–3)	Stripling (1)	29–27	7½
57	September 24	Yankees	4–1	Ryu (5–2)	Montgomery (2–3)	Dolis (5)	30–27	7
58	September 25	Orioles	10–5	Pearson (1–0)	López (2–2)	—	31–27	7
59	September 26	Orioles	5–2	Anderson (1–2)	Means (2–4)	Bass (7)	32–27	7
60	September 27	Orioles	5–7	Lakins (3–2)	Yamaguchi (2–4)	Valdez (3)	32–28	8

==== Postseason ====
Legend
Blue Jays win	Blue Jays loss	Game postponed

2020 Postseason Game Log
American League Wild Card Series: 0–2

#	Date	Opponent	Score	Win	Loss	Save	Series
1	September 29	@ Rays	1–3	Snell (1–0)	Ray (0–1)	Fairbanks (1)	0–1
2	September 30	@ Rays	2–8	Glasnow (1–0)	Ryu (0–1)	—	0–2

== Postseason rosters ==
Playoff rosters
American League Wild Card Series

- Pitchers: 22 Chase Anderson 24 Nate Pearson 31 Thomas Hatch 34 Matt Shoemaker 36 A. J. Cole 38 Robbie Ray 41 Rafael Dolis 47 Anthony Kay 48 Ross Stripling 52 Anthony Bass 56 Ryan Borucki 99 Hyun-jin Ryu 00 Taijuan Walker
- Catchers: 9 Danny Jansen 10 Reese McGuire 85 Alejandro Kirk
- Infielders: 2 Joe Panik 5 Santiago Espinal 6 Travis Shaw 8 Cavan Biggio 11 Bo Bichette 20 Jonathan Villar 27 Vladimir Guerrero Jr. 44 Rowdy Tellez
- Outfielders: 13 Lourdes Gurriel Jr. 15 Randal Grichuk 37 Teoscar Hernández 49 Jonathan Davis

== Standings ==
=== American League East ===
AL East
Team	W	L	Pct.	GB	Home	Road
Tampa Bay Rays	40	20	.667	—	20‍–‍9	20‍–‍11
New York Yankees	33	27	.550	7	22‍–‍9	11‍–‍18
Toronto Blue Jays	32	28	.533	8	17‍–‍9	15‍–‍19
Baltimore Orioles	25	35	.417	15	13‍–‍20	12‍–‍15
Boston Red Sox	24	36	.400	16	11‍–‍20	13‍–‍16

=== American League Wild Card ===
Division leaders
Team	W	L	Pct.
Tampa Bay Rays	40	20	.667
Oakland Athletics	36	24	.600
Minnesota Twins	36	24	.600

Division 2nd place
Team	W	L	Pct.
Cleveland Indians	35	25	.583
New York Yankees	33	27	.550
Houston Astros	29	31	.483

Wild Card teams (Top 2 teams qualify for postseason)
Team	W	L	Pct.	GB
Chicago White Sox	35	25	.583	+3
Toronto Blue Jays	32	28	.533	—
Seattle Mariners	27	33	.450	5
Los Angeles Angels	26	34	.433	6
Kansas City Royals	26	34	.433	6
Baltimore Orioles	25	35	.417	7
Boston Red Sox	24	36	.400	8
Detroit Tigers	23	35	.397	8
Texas Rangers	22	38	.367	10

=== Records vs opponents ===
	Record			Games Left		
Opponent	Home	Road	Total	Home	Road	Total
AL East
Baltimore Orioles	5–2	3–0	8–2	–	–	–
Boston Red Sox	1–2	4–3	5–5	–	–	–
New York Yankees	5–2	0–3	5–5	–	–	–
Tampa Bay Rays	1–2	3–4	4–6	–	–	–
Totals	12–8	10–10	22–18	–	–	–
NL East
Atlanta Braves	–	1–2	1–2	–	–	–
Miami Marlins	1–1	1–1	2–2	–	–	–
New York Mets	2–1	–	2–1	–	–	–
Philadelphia Phillies	2–1	1–2	3–3	–	–	–
Washington Nationals	0–2	2–0	2–2	–	–	–
Totals	5–5	5–5	10–10	–	–	–
Grand Totals	17–13	15–15	32–28	–	–	–

Month	Games	Won	Lost	Pct.
July	7	3	4	.429
August	26	15	11	.577
September	27	14	13	.519
Totals	60	32	28	.533

=== Achievements ===
- In their 14–11 defeat to the Miami Marlins on August 12, the Blue Jays tied a major league record when they became the fourth team to hit seven home runs in a game and still lose.
- In their 10–8 victory over the Boston Red Sox on September 6, the Blue Jays set a new franchise record for longest 9-inning game at 4 hours 23 minutes.
- In the 15–17 September series against the New York Yankees, the Blue Jays recorded the dubious achievement of becoming the first team since 1901 to give up six or more home runs in each of three consecutive games.
- A Blue Jays locker from Sahlen Field was preserved as an artifact in the Canadian Baseball Hall of Fame.

=== Regular season transactions ===
==== July ====
- On July 26, optioned Billy McKinney to the team's alternate training site and activated Brandon Drury.
- On July 27, placed Ken Giles on the 10-day injured list, placed Travis Shaw on the bereavement list, activated Wilmer Font, and recalled Ryan Borucki from the team's alternate training site.
- On July 29, optioned Brian Moran to the team's alternate training site and selected the contract of Nate Pearson.
- On July 31, optioned Sam Gaviglio to the team's alternate training site.

==== August ====
- On August 2, optioned Jonathan Davis to the team's alternate training site.
- On August 3, activated Travis Shaw.
- On August 5, placed Derek Fisher on the 10-day injured list and recalled Billy McKinney.
- On August 6, optioned Santiago Espinal and Jacob Waguespack to the team's alternate training site, placed Trent Thornton on the 10-day injured list and recalled Jacob Waguespack from the team's alternate training site.
- On August 8, activated Chase Anderson and optioned Billy McKinney to the team's alternate training site
- On August 16, placed Bo Bichette on the 10-day injured list and recalled Santiago Espinal and Sam Gaviglio.
- On August 17, optioned Sam Gaviglio to the team's alternate training site.
- On August 18, optioned Jacob Waguespack to the team's alternate training site and recalled Julian Merryweather.
- On August 19, placed Nate Pearson on the 10-day injured list and recalled Jacob Waguespack.
- On August 20, designated Anthony Alford for assignment, recalled Billy McKinney, and activated Trent Thornton.
- On August 21, optioned Billy McKinney and Jacob Waguespack to the team's alternate training site and recalled Sam Gaviglio.
- On August 23, placed Matt Shoemaker on the 10-day injured list and recalled Jacob Waguespack.
- On August 24, placed Trent Thornton on the 10-day injured list, designated Thomas Pannone for assignment, acquired Daniel Vogelbach from the Seattle Mariners for cash and selected the contract of Travis Bergen.
- On August 26, optioned Travis Bergen and Sam Gaviglio to the team's alternate training site, activated Derek Fisher and recalled Sean Reid-Foley.
- On August 27, activated Daniel Vogelbach, transferred Trent Thornton to the 60-day injured list, optioned Sean Reid-Foley and acquired Taijuan Walker from the Seattle Mariners for a player to be named later.
- On August 28, activated Taijuan Walker, outrighted Thomas Pannone to the team's alternate training site and optioned Brandon Drury to the team's alternate training site.
- On August 29, placed Jordan Romano on the 10-day injured list and recalled Sean Reid-Foley.
- On August 31, designated Brandon Drury and Sam Gaviglio for assignment, released Ruben Tejada, acquired Robbie Ray from the Arizona Diamondbacks for Travis Bergen, acquired Jonathan Villar from the Miami Marlins for a Player To Be Named Later and acquired Ross Stripling from the Los Angeles Dodgers for a Player To Be Named Later and a Player To Be Named Later.

==== September ====
- On September 1, activated Robbie Ray and Jonathan Villar, optioned Jacob Waguespack to the team's alternate training site, designated Daniel Vogelbach for assignment and traded Alberto Rodriguez to the Seattle Mariners.
- On September 2, activated Ross Stripling and optioned Sean Reid-Foley to the team's alternate training site.
- On September 4, recalled Sean Reid-Foley and outrighted Brandon Drury and Sam Gaviglio to the team's alternate training site.
- On September 5, optioned Reese McGuire and Sean Reid-Foley to the team's alternate training site, selected the contract of Caleb Joseph and transferred Ken Giles to the 60-day injured list.
- On September 7, placed Wilmer Font and Teoscar Hernandez on the 10-day injured list and recalled Jonathan Davis and Sean Reid-Foley.
- On September 9, placed Rowdy Tellez on the 10-day injured list, recalled Billy McKinney and released Jake Petricka.
- On September 11, activated Ken Giles, designated Caleb Joseph and Billey McKinney for assignment, optioned Sean Reid-Foley to the team's alternate training site, selected the contract of Alejandro Kirk and recalled Jacob Waguespack.
- On September 12, activated Bo Bichette and optioned Jacob Waguespack to the team's alternate training site.
- On September 15, outrighted Caleb Joseph to the team's alternate training site.
- On September 16, recalled Hector Perez and Jacob Waguespack, placed Derek Fisher and Ken Giles on the 10-day injured list, activated Teoscar Hernandez, optioned Anthony Kay to the team's alternate training site and traded Justin Miller to the Cincinnati Reds for Future Considerations.
- On September 17, optioned Hector Perez to the team's alternate training site, placed Jacob Waguespack on the 10-day injured list, activated Wilmer Font and recalled T.J. Zeuch.
- On September 18, recalled Patrick Murphy and traded Griffin Conine to the Miami Marlins.
- On September 19, optioned Santiago Espinal to the team's alternate training site.
- On September 21, placed Julian Merryweather on the 10-day injured list and activated Matt Shoemaker.
- On September 22, transferred Ken Giles from the 10-day injured list to the 60-day injured list.
- On September 24, activated Nate Pearson and designated Wilmer Font for assignment.
- On September 27, outrighted Wilmer Font to the team's alternate training site.

== Roster ==
2020 Toronto Blue Jays
Roster
Pitchers: 22 Chase Anderson; 52 Anthony Bass; 79 Travis Bergen; 56 Ryan Borucki; 36 A. J. Cole; 41 Rafael Dolis; 63 Wilmer Font; 43 Sam Gaviglio; 51 Ken Giles; 31 Thomas Hatch; 47 Anthony Kay; 67 Julian Merryweather; 48 Brian Moran; 66 Patrick Murphy; 24 Nate Pearson; 64 Héctor Pérez; 38 Robbie Ray; 54 Sean Reid-Foley; 14 Tanner Roark; 68 Jordan Romano; 99 Hyun-jin Ryu; 34 Matt Shoemaker; 48 Ross Stripling; 57 Trent Thornton; 62 Jacob Waguespack; 00 Taijuan Walker; 1 Shun Yamaguchi; 35 T. J. Zeuch	Catchers: 9 Danny Jansen; 7 Caleb Joseph; 85 Alejandro Kirk; 10 Reese McGuire; Infielders: 11 Bo Bichette; 8 Cavan Biggio; 3 Brandon Drury; 5 Santiago Espinal; 27 Vladimir Guerrero Jr.; 2 Joe Panik; 6 Travis Shaw; 44 Rowdy Tellez; 30,20 Jonathan Villar	Outfielders: 30 Anthony Alford; 49 Jonathan Davis; 23 Derek Fisher; 15 Randal Grichuk; 13 Lourdes Gurriel Jr.; 37 Teoscar Hernández; 28 Billy McKinney; Other batters: 20 Daniel Vogelbach	Manager: 25 Charlie Montoyo; Coaches: 61 Alex Andreopoulos (bullpen catcher); 55 Nevin Ashley (bullpen catcher); 21 Dante Bichette (coach); 53 Mark Budzinski (first base); 26 Matt Buschmann (bullpen); 39 Dave Hudgens (bench); 16 Gil Kim (coach); 18 Guillermo Martínez (hitting); 4 Luis Rivera (third base); 17 John Schneider (coach); 40 Pete Walker (pitching)

== Statistics ==
=== Batting ===
(Updated as of September 27, 2020)

Note: G = Games played; AB = At bats; R = Runs scored; H = Hits; 2B = Doubles; 3B = Triples; HR = Home runs; RBI = Runs batted in; SB = Stolen bases; BB = Walks; AVG = Batting average; Ref. = Reference

Player	G	AB	R	H	2B	3B	HR	RBI	SB	BB	AVG	Ref.
Anthony Alford	13	16	3	3	0	0	1	3	3	0	.188	
Bo Bichette	29	123	18	37	9	1	5	23	4	5	.301	
Cavan Biggio	59	220	41	55	16	0	8	28	6	41	.250	
Jonathan Davis	13	27	4	7	2	0	1	6	1	3	.259	
Brandon Drury	21	46	3	7	1	0	0	1	0	2	.152	
Santiago Espinal	26	60	10	16	4	0	0	6	1	4	.267	
Derek Fisher	16	31	5	7	2	1	1	7	0	7	.226	
Randal Grichuk	55	216	38	59	9	0	12	35	1	13	.273	
Vladimir Guerrero Jr.	60	221	34	58	13	2	9	33	1	20	.262	
Lourdes Gurriel Jr.	57	208	28	64	14	0	11	33	3	14	.308	
Teoscar Hernandez	50	190	33	55	7	0	16	34	6	14	.289	
Danny Jansen	43	120	18	22	3	0	6	20	0	21	.183	
Caleb Joseph	3	8	2	1	0	0	1	2	0	1	.125	
Alejandro Kirk	9	24	4	9	2	0	1	3	0	1	.375	
Reese McGuire	19	41	2	3	0	0	1	1	0	0	.073	
Billy McKinney	2	3	1	2	0	0	0	0	0	0	.667	
Joe Panik	41	120	18	27	6	0	1	7	0	20	.225	
Travis Shaw	50	163	17	39	10	0	6	17	0	16	.239	
Rowdy Tellez	35	113	20	32	5	0	8	23	0	11	.283	
Jonathan Villar	22	69	3	13	1	0	0	6	7	9	.188	
Daniel Vogelbach	2	4	0	0	0	0	0	0	0	1	.000	
Team totals	60	2023	302	516	104	4	88	288	33	203	.255	

=== Pitching ===
(Updated as of September 27, 2020)

Note: G = Games pitched; GS = Games started; W = Wins; L = Losses; SV = Saves; ERA = Earned run average; WHIP = Walks plus hits per inning pitched; H = Hits allowed; R = Runs allowed; ER = Earned runs allowed; BB = Walks allowed; K = Strikeouts; Ref. = Reference

Player	G	GS	W	L	SV	ERA	WHIP	IP	H	R	ER	BB	K	Ref.
Chase Anderson	10	7	1	2	0	7.22	1.63	33 2/3	45	29	27	10	38	
Anthony Bass	26	0	2	3	7	3.51	1.01	25 2/3	17	13	10	9	21	
Travis Bergen	1	0	0	0	0	0.00	1.50	1 2/3	1	0	0	1	3	
Ryan Borucki	21	0	1	1	0	2.70	1.44	16 2/3	12	5	5	12	21	
A. J. Cole	24	0	3	0	1	3.09	1.20	23 1/3	19	9	8	9	20	
Rafael Dolis	24	0	2	2	5	1.50	1.25	24	16	9	4	14	31	
Wilmer Font	21	0	1	3	0	9.92	2.27	16 1/3	28	19	18	9	15	
Sam Gaviglio	4	0	0	1	0	9.00	2.67	3	3	3	3	5	1	
Ken Giles	4	0	0	0	1	9.82	2.18	3 2/3	4	4	4	4	6	
Thomas Hatch	17	1	3	1	0	2.73	1.18	26 1/3	18	11	8	13	23	
Anthony Kay	13	0	2	0	0	5.14	1.71	21	22	13	12	14	22	
Julian Merryweather	8	3	0	0	0	4.15	1.31	13	11	6	6	6	15	
Brian Moran	2	0	0	0	0	0.00	1.00	1	1	0	0	0	1	
Patrick Murphy	4	0	0	0	0	1.50	1.33	6	6	1	1	2	5	
Nate Pearson	5	4	1	0	0	6.00	1.50	18	14	15	12	13	16	
Hector Perez	1	0	0	0	0	10.80	3.60	1 2/3	3	2	2	3	1	
Robbie Ray	5	4	1	1	0	4.79	1.74	20 2/3	22	13	11	14	25	
Sean Reid-Foley	5	0	1	0	0	1.35	1.35	6 2/3	3	3	1	6	6	
Tanner Roark	11	11	2	3	0	6.80	1.74	47 2/3	60	39	36	23	41	
Jordan Romano	15	0	2	1	2	1.23	0.89	14 2/3	8	3	2	5	21	
Hyun-jin Ryu	12	12	5	2	0	2.69	1.15	67	60	22	20	17	72	
Matt Shoemaker	6	6	0	1	0	4.71	1.08	28 2/3	22	16	15	9	26	
Ross Stripling	5	2	0	2	1	6.32	1.60	15 2/3	18	11	11	7	13	
Trent Thornton	3	3	0	0	0	11.12	3.18	5 2/3	15	7	7	3	6	
Jacob Waguespack	11	0	0	0	0	8.15	1.47	17 2/3	27	20	16	9	16	
Taijuan Walker	6	6	2	1	0	1.37	1.25	26 1/3	22	10	4	11	25	
Shun Yamaguchi	17	0	2	4	0	8.06	1.75	25 2/3	28	25	23	17	26	
T. J. Zeuch	3	1	1	0	0	1.59	1.15	11 1/3	9	2	2	4	3	
Team totals	60	60	32	28	17	4.60	1.46	524.2	517	312	268	250	519	

== 2020 Major League Baseball draft ==
The 2020 Major League Baseball (MLB) First-Year Player Draft occurred on Monday, June 10 through June 11, 2020. The draft assigned amateur baseball players to MLB teams. Due to the COVID-19 pandemic, the draft was shortened to only five rounds.

Round	Pick	Player	Position	College/School	Nationality	Signed
1	5	Austin Martin	SS	Vanderbilt	(United States)	July 8
2	42	CJ Van Eyk	RHP	Florida State	(United States)	June 18
3	77	Trent Palmer	RHP	Jacksonville	(United States)	June 18
4	106	Nick Frasso	RHP	Loyola Marymount	(United States)	July 8
5	136	Zach Britton	OF	Louisville	(United States)	June 18

== Farm system ==
Due to the COVID-19 pandemic, Major League Baseball announced the cancellation of the entire Minor League Baseball season on June 30. The Blue Jays taxi squad was based at Frontier Field in Rochester, New York.
