= Yamaguchi Hisashi =

Japanese sumo wrestler

Personal information
- Native name: 山口 久
- Born: Hisashi Yamaguchi; April 16, 1952 Nakatsu, Ōita, Japan
- Died: October 19, 2010 (aged 58)
- Height: 1.81 m (5 ft 11 1/2 in)
- Weight: 126 kg (278 lb; 19.8 st)

Sport
- Sport: Sumo
- Retired: November, 1982
- Heya: Tokitsukaze
- Record: 345-292-12
- Debut: January, 1971
- Highest rank: Maegashira 4 (March, 1979)
- Championships: 1 (Jūryō); 2 (Makushita); 1 (Jonokuchi)
- Updated on Sep. 2012

Yamaguchi Hisashi (born Hisashi Yamaguchi; April 16, 1952 – October 19, 2010) was a sumo wrestler from Nakatsu Ōita, Japan. He made his professional debut in January 1971, won the championship in his only sixth-division tournament, and another in March 1977 winning undefeated in third division. He reached the top division in May 1978, but struggled initially. After winning the second division in November, securing a second re-promotion, he reached his highest rank of maegashira 4 in March 1979.

Upon initial promotion he had changed his shikona from his real name to Taniarashi Hisashi. He would drop back to the unsalaried ranks in 1980 Winning out in a rare nine-way playoff, he secured the third-division championship in March 1982, but retired soon after in November 1982.

His son is Shun Yamaguchi, a former baseball player.

== Career record ==
Yamaguchi Hisashi
Year	January Hatsu basho, Tokyo	March Haru basho, Osaka	May Natsu basho, Tokyo	July Nagoya basho, Nagoya	September Aki basho, Tokyo	November Kyūshū basho, Fukuoka
1971	(Maezumo)	East Jonokuchi #1; 7–0; Champion	East Jonidan #8; 4–3	East Sandanme #77; 6–1	West Sandanme #39; 6–1	East Makushita #58; 4–3
1972	East Makushita #49; 4–3	East Makushita #43; 4–3	East Makushita #37; 3–4	West Makushita #43; 5–2	East Makushita #27; 2–5	East Makushita #44; 2–5
1973	West Sandanme #6; 4–3	East Makushita #56; 6–1	West Makushita #25; 4–3	West Makushita #20; 4–3	East Makushita #15; 4–3	West Makushita #13; 4–3
1974	East Makushita #10; 3–4	West Makushita #14; 6–1–P	East Makushita #3; 1–1–5	West Makushita #22; Sat out due to injury 0–0–7	West Sandanme #2; 5–2	East Makushita #42; 5–2
1975	West Makushita #25; 3–4	East Makushita #31; 4–3	East Makushita #22; 5–2	West Makushita #13; 4–3	West Makushita #9; 2–5	West Makushita #23; 5–2
1976	East Makushita #13; 4–3	East Makushita #11; 3–4	East Makushita #18; 5–2	East Makushita #9; 4–3	West Makushita #6; 2–5	West Makushita #22; 5–2
1977	West Makushita #12; 5–2	West Makushita #3; 7–0; Champion	West Jūryō #8; 8–7	West Jūryō #6; 8–7	East Jūryō #3; 5–10	East Jūryō #11; 8–7
1978	East Jūryō #9; 10–5	West Jūryō #1; 9–6	West Maegashira #12; 6–9	East Jūryō #4; 10–5–PP	West Maegashira #13; 5–10	East Jūryō #7; 13–2; Champion
1979	East Maegashira #12; 10–5	West Maegashira #4; 7–8	West Maegashira #5; 7–8	West Maegashira #6; 6–9	West Maegashira #11; 5–10	West Jūryō #3; 6–9
1980	West Jūryō #6; 6–9	West Jūryō #10; 1–14	West Makushita #11; 2–5	West Makushita #30; 4–3	West Makushita #20; 4–3	West Makushita #14; 2–5
1981	East Makushita #32; 4–3	East Makushita #26; 6–1	West Makushita #8; 6–1–P	West Makushita #1; 5–2	East Jūryō #13; 5–10	West Makushita #7; 2–5
1982	West Makushita #24; 3–4	West Makushita #34; 6–1–PPPP; Champion	West Makushita #9; 4–3	East Makushita #7; 4–3	West Makushita #4; 3–4	East Makushita #11; Retired; 4–3
Record given as wins–losses–absences Top division champion Top division runner-up Retired Lower divisions Non-participation Sanshō key: F=Fighting spirit; O=Outstanding performance; T=Technique Also shown: ★=Kinboshi; P=Playoff(s); Divisions: Makuuchi — Jūryō — Makushita — Sandanme — Jonidan — Jonokuchi Makuuchi ranks: Yokozuna — Ōzeki — Sekiwake — Komusubi — Maegashira

== See also ==
- Glossary of sumo terms
- List of sumo tournament second division champions
