= Reese McGuire =

American baseball player (born 1995)

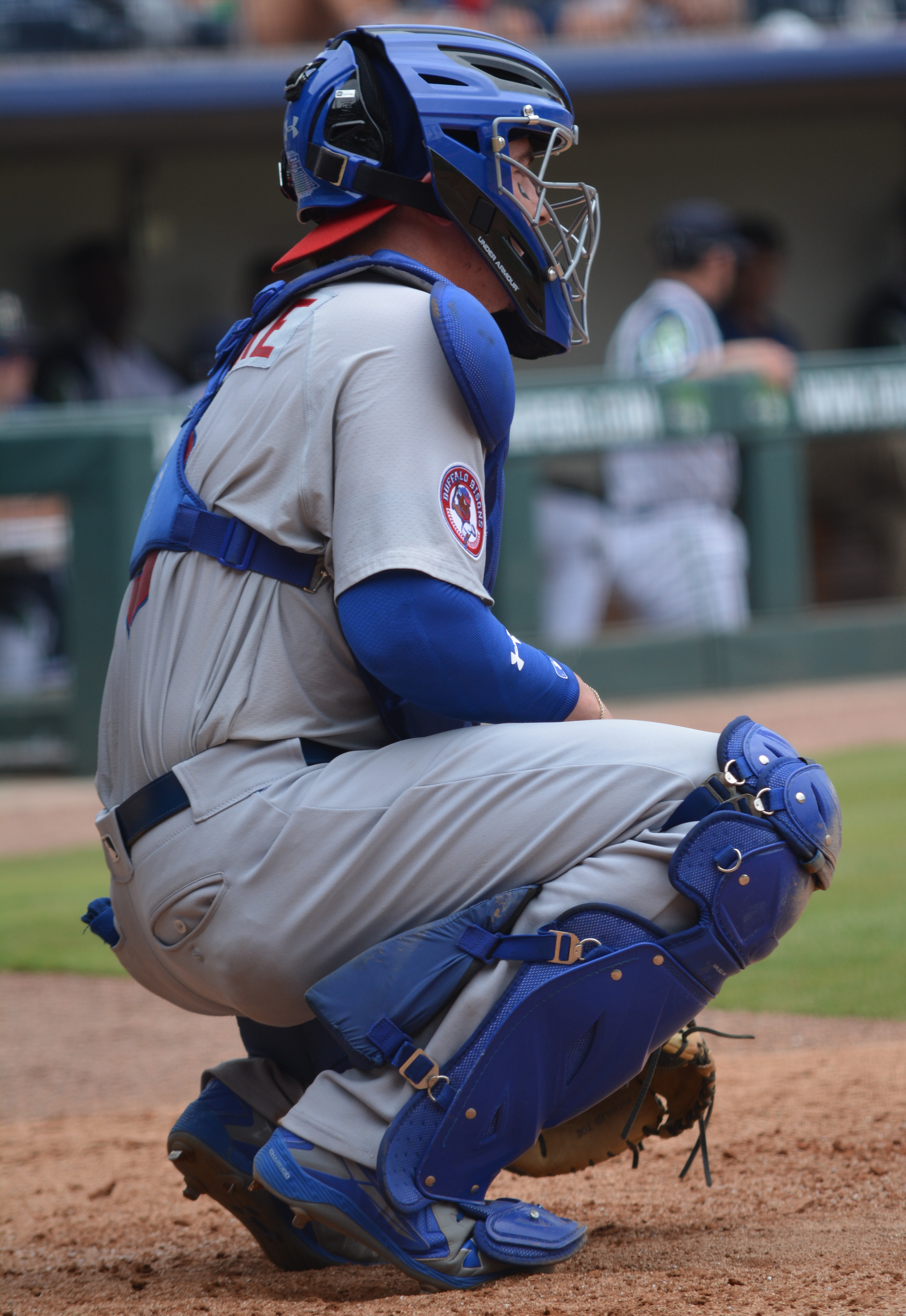
- McGuire with the Buffalo Bisons in 2018

Free agent
- Catcher
- Born: March 2, 1995 (age 31); Seattle, Washington, U.S.
- Bats: Left Throws: Right

MLB debut
- September 6, 2018, for the Toronto Blue Jays

MLB statistics (through April 23, 2026)
- Batting average: .246
- Home runs: 25
- Runs batted in: 109
- Stats at Baseball Reference

Teams
- Toronto Blue Jays (2018–2021); Chicago White Sox (2022); Boston Red Sox (2022–2024); Chicago Cubs (2025); Chicago White Sox (2026)
Medals
Men's baseball
Representing United States
18U Baseball World Championship
Gold medal – first place	2012 Seoul	Team

Reese Jackson McGuire (born March 2, 1995) is an American professional baseball catcher who is a free agent. He has previously played in Major League Baseball (MLB) for the Toronto Blue Jays, Boston Red Sox, Chicago Cubs, and Chicago White Sox.

McGuire was drafted by the Pittsburgh Pirates in the first round of the 2013 MLB draft, and was traded to the Blue Jays in 2016. He made his MLB debut for Toronto in 2018. The Blue Jays traded McGuire to the White Sox before the 2022 season, and the White Sox traded him to the Red Sox during the 2022 season.

== Early life ==
McGuire was born March 2, 1995, in Seattle, Washington, as the middle of Scott and Robin McGuire's three sons. Growing up playing Little League with his older brother Cash, McGuire would switch between pitcher and catcher. When Cash's preteen growth spurt made him a more frequent pitcher, Reese took on more frequent catching duties. In 2012, McGuire was named the USA Baseball Player of the Year for his performance with the United States national under-18 baseball team. Playing as a catcher, third baseman, first baseman, left fielder, and designated hitter, McGuire led Team USA with a .400 batting average and 11 runs batted in (RBI) over 35 at bats, and he captured a gold medal with the team at the 2012 18U Baseball World Championship in Seoul. As a senior at Kentwood High School in Covington, Washington, McGuire batted .436 with four home runs and 20 RBI.

== Professional career ==
=== Pittsburgh Pirates (2013–2016) ===
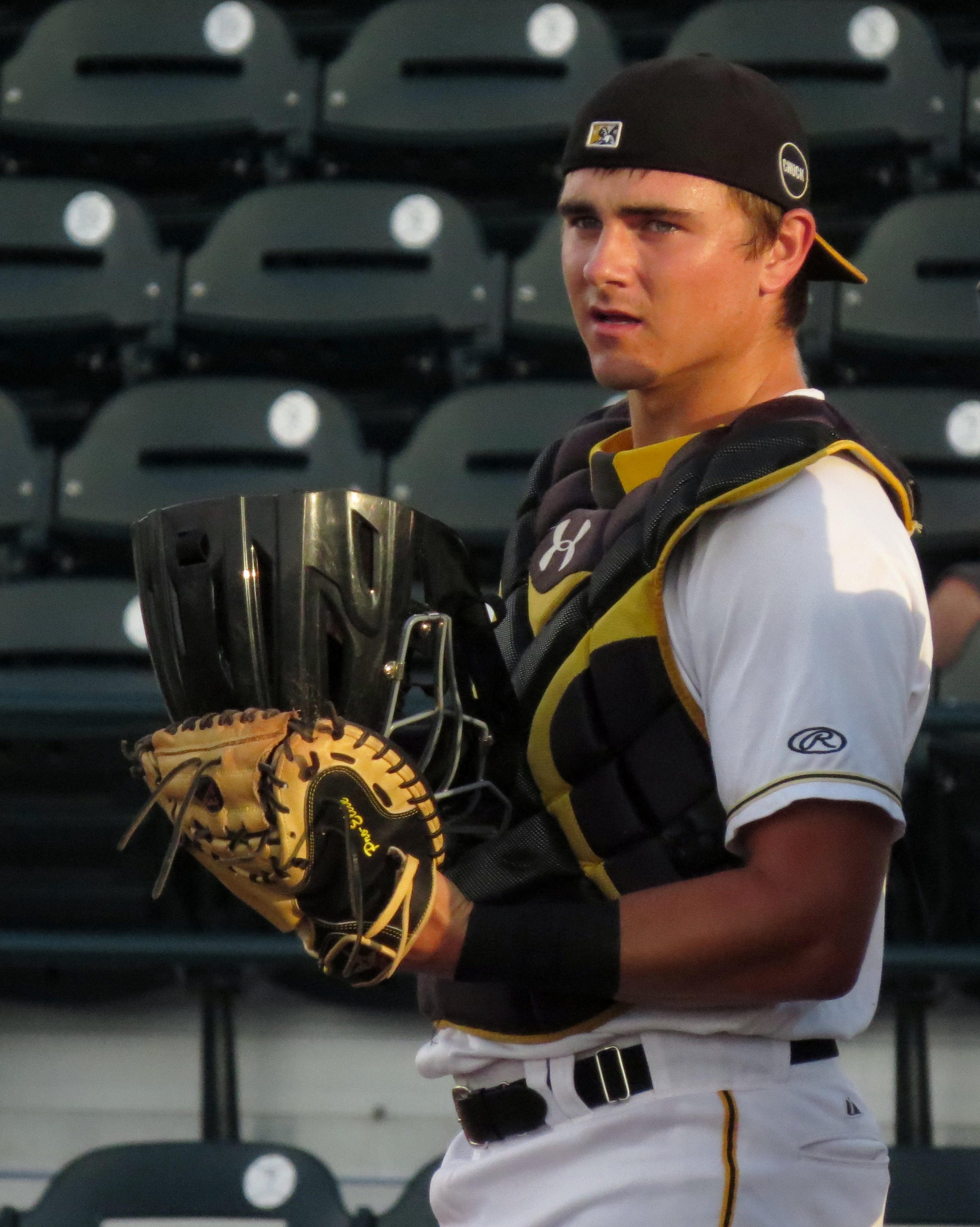
McGuire with the Bradenton Marauders in 2015

As a high school catcher, Major League Baseball (MLB) analysts praised McGuire's defensive ability, and analysts projected he would be taken in the first round of the 2013 MLB draft. The Pittsburgh Pirates selected him 14th overall, the highest draft selection for a high school catcher since 2008. At the time, McGuire had committed to play college baseball for the San Diego Toreros. He signed with the Pirates on June 18, earning a $2.36 million signing bonus in the process, and was assigned to the Rookie-level GCL Pirates. In his professional baseball debut on July 4, McGuire recorded four hits, three RBI, and two doubles. After hitting .330 with 11 doubles and 21 RBI in 46 Gulf Coast League games, McGuire was promoted to the Class A Short Season Jamestown Jammers at the end of August. He appeared in only four New York–Penn League games, going 4-for-16 with a walk in the process.

McGuire was one of several highly regarded prospects to join the Low-A West Virginia Power for the 2014 season. As a South Atlantic League prospect, McGuire demonstrated at 1.8-second pop time behind the plate, as well as consistent contact hitting. Batting .277 with one home run and 19 RBI through the midway point of the season, including a 19-game hitting streak in May, McGuire was named a South Atlantic League All-Star. He finished the season batting .262 with three home runs and 45 RBI in 98 games. After the season, McGuire added 15 pounds of muscle and told reporters that he wanted to "come up with a consistent approach at the plate and stick with it" in 2015.

McGuire opened the 2015 season with the High-A Bradenton Marauders of the Florida State League (FSL). After hitting .259 to start the season, with 10 stolen bases and throwing out 14 opposing base stealers, McGuire was named an FSL All-Star in June. He finished the season batting .254 with 15 doubles and 34 RBI. While McGuire's defensive ability received praise from coaches, his offense was not as well-developed by the end of the season. After two consecutive seasons seeing his batting average decrease, McGuire joined the Glendale Desert Dogs of the Arizona Fall League to improve his offense. In 14 games there, he hit .294 with five extra-base hits.

McGuire was one of 12 Pirates prospects invited to attend spring training with the team in 2016. After being reassigned to minor league camp in March, he opened the season with the Double-A Altoona Curve. One of the youngest players on the team, McGuire showed more consistency and discipline at the plate, drawing walks and keeping his batting average above .250, although he still lacked power. In 266 at bats across 77 games, he hit .259 with one home run and 37 RBI.

=== Toronto Blue Jays (2016–2021) ===
On August 1, 2016, McGuire, fellow prospect Harold Ramírez, and pitcher Francisco Liriano were traded from the Pirates to the Toronto Blue Jays in exchange for pitcher Drew Hutchison. He finished out the season with the Double-A New Hampshire Fisher Cats, batting .226 with five RBI in 15 games and 53 at bats.

McGuire returned to the Fisher Cats for the 2017 season, but was limited to only 45 games after suffering a torn meniscus in his right knee that required arthroscopic surgery to repair. After suffering the knee injury in early May, McGuire was able to return to Double-A at the start of August, and shortly after his return, McGuire's home runs in three consecutive games earned him Eastern League Player of the Week honors for the week ending August 20. In his limited appearances in 2017, McGuire batted .295 with six home runs and 28 RBI in 149 at bats.

On November 20, 2017, the Blue Jays added McGuire to their 40-man roster, protecting him from the Rule 5 draft. He played for the Buffalo Bisons of the Triple-A International League in 2018. On September 6, 2018, the Blue Jays promoted McGuire to the major leagues. He made his MLB debut that night against the Cleveland Indians and hit a double in the game for his first career hit. He hit his first career home run on September 26 against the Houston Astros. In 14 major-league games, McGuire batted .290 with two home runs and four RBIs.

McGuire did not make the 2019 opening day roster and was optioned to Triple-A. McGuire joined the Blue Jays in late July after Luke Maile was injured, and appeared in 30 games throughout the season, hitting .299 with an .872 OPS. Overall with the 2020 Blue Jays, McGuire batted .073 with one home run and one RBI in 19 games.

On April 1, 2021, McGuire was designated for assignment by the Blue Jays. Clearing waivers, he was assigned to the Jays' alternate training site, before being assigned to Triple-A Buffalo on May 3. On May 5, McGuire was selected to Toronto's active roster. With Toronto in 2021, McGuire played in 78 games, batting .253 with one home run and 10 RBIs.

In parts of four seasons with the Blue Jays, McGuire made 141 major-league appearances, batting .248 with nine home runs and 26 RBIs.

=== Chicago White Sox (2022) ===
On April 3, 2022, the Blue Jays traded McGuire to the Chicago White Sox for catcher Zack Collins. McGuire played in 53 games for Chicago, batting .225 with no home runs and 10 RBIs.

=== Boston Red Sox (2022–2024) ===
On August 1, 2022, the Boston Red Sox acquired McGuire and Taylor Broadway in exchange for reliever Jake Diekman. McGuire played 36 games for the Red Sox in 2022, batting .337 with three home runs and 12 RBI. Overall during 2022, McGuire batted .269 with three home runs and 22 RBI in 89 major-league games.

On January 13, 2023, the Red Sox and McGuire reached agreement on a one-year contract, avoiding salary arbitration. He served as Boston's backup catcher until June 22, when he was placed on the injured list with a right oblique strain. McGuire was activated on August 1, and hit his first home run of the season later that day. In 72 total appearances, he slashed .267/.310/.358 with one home run and 16 RBI.

On January 12, 2024, McGuire once again avoided salary arbitration with the Red Sox by signing a one-year contract with the team. On April 7, McGuire drove in a career high of five RBI in a 12–2 victory over the Los Angeles Angels.

On July 28, McGuire was designated for assignment by the Red Sox. In 52 games for Boston, he batted .209/.280/.295 with three home runs and 18 RBI. Red Sox manager Alex Cora explained that the team made a change at the backup catcher position in consideration of roster balance, changing from a left-handed batter (McGuire) to a right-handed batter (Danny Jansen). McGuire cleared waivers and was sent outright to the Triple–A Worcester Red Sox on August 2. He elected free agency on September 30.

=== Chicago Cubs (2025) ===
On January 22, 2025, McGuire signed a minor league contract with the Chicago Cubs. In 22 appearances for the Triple-A Iowa Cubs, he batted .280/.360/.467 with three home runs, 19 RBI, and two stolen bases. On May 25, the Cubs selected McGuire's contract, adding him to their active roster. In his first plate appearance for the Cubs that day, he hit a solo home run, following it up later in the game with a game-tying solo home run, ultimately resulting in a Cubs comeback victory. McGuire made 44 appearances for the Cubs, batting .226/.245/.444 with nine home runs and 24 RBI. On November 21, he was non-tendered by Chicago and became a free agent.

=== Chicago White Sox (second stint) ===
On January 28, 2026, McGuire signed a minor league contract with the Milwaukee Brewers. He opted out of his contract with the Brewers on March 21 after being told he would not make the major league roster. On March 22, McGuire signed with the Chicago White Sox on a one-year, $1.2 million contract. He made 11 appearances for Chicago, going 5-for-29 (.172) with three RBI and two walks. On April 25, McGuire was designated for assignment by the White Sox following the promotion of Drew Romo. He elected free agency after clearing waivers on April 27.

== Personal life ==
McGuire's older brother, Cash, played second base for Seattle University. His younger brother, Shane, played baseball at the University of San Diego as a catcher, was taken in the 2021 MLB draft, and is now in the Athletics organization.

In February 2020, McGuire was charged with a misdemeanor count of indecent exposure in his car in a shopping center parking lot in Dunedin, Florida, near the Blue Jays spring training complex. He pleaded no contest to a charge of disorderly conduct and was fined $500.
