= Patrick Murphy (baseball) =

American baseball player (born 1995)

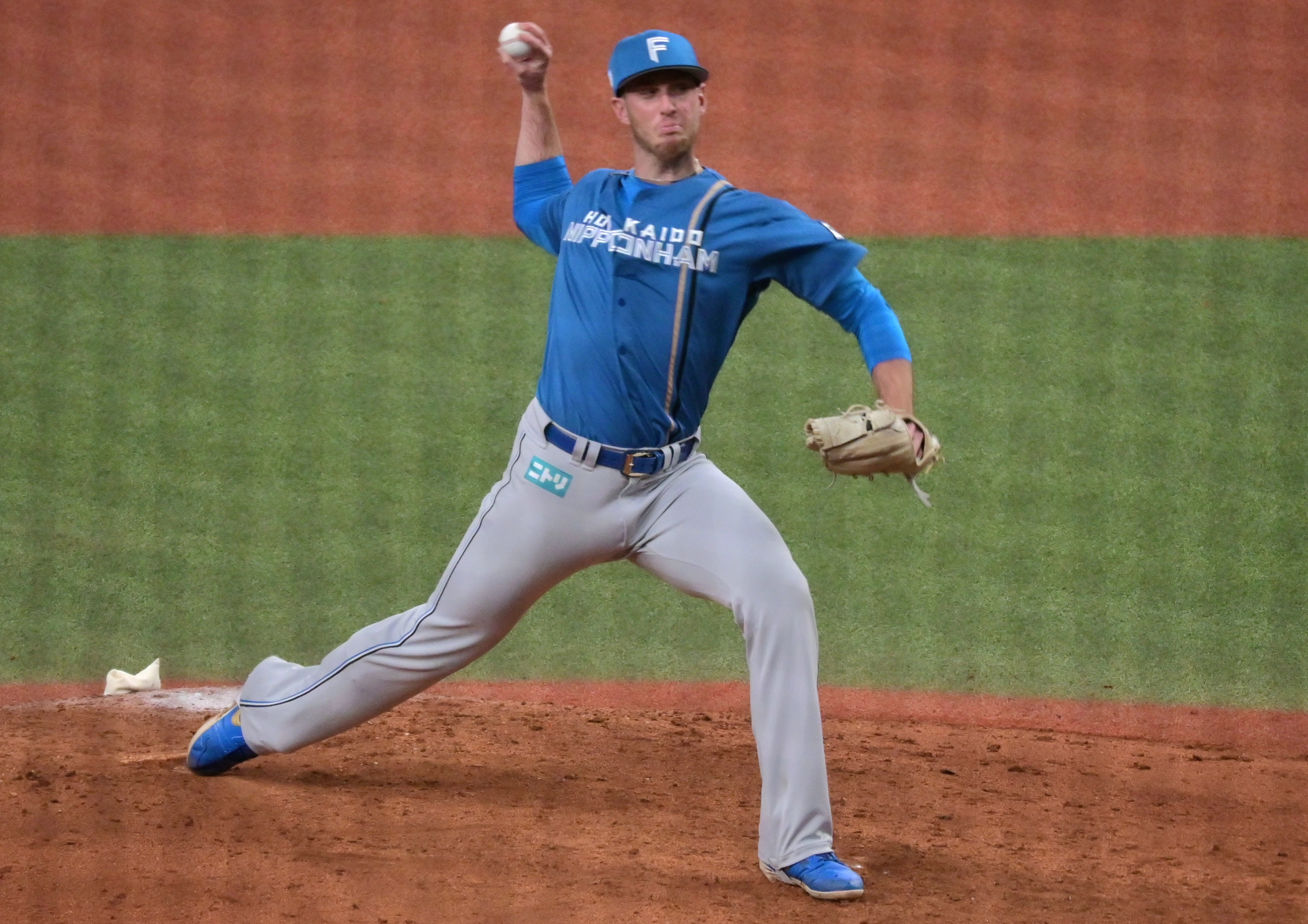
- Murphy with the Hokkaido Nippon Ham-Fighters

Free agent
- Pitcher
- Born: June 10, 1995 (age 31); Chandler, Arizona, U.S.
- Bats: Right Throws: Right

Professional debut
- MLB: September 18, 2020, for the Toronto Blue Jays
- NPB: March 30, 2024, for the Hokkaido Nippon-Ham Fighters
- KBO: July 18, 2025, for the KT Wiz

MLB statistics (through 2022 season)
- Win–loss record: 0–3
- Earned run average: 4.76
- Strikeouts: 38

NPB statistics (through 2024 season)
- Win–loss record: 1–2
- Earned run average: 3.26
- Strikeouts: 30

KBO statistics (through 2025 season)
- Win–loss record: 3-3
- Earned run average: 3.12
- Strikeouts: 45
- Stats at Baseball Reference

Teams
- Toronto Blue Jays (2020–2021); Washington Nationals (2021–2022); Hokkaido Nippon-Ham Fighters (2024); KT Wiz (2025)

Patrick Brian Murphy (born June 10, 1995) is an American professional baseball pitcher who is a free agent. He has previously played in Major League Baseball (MLB) for the Toronto Blue Jays and Washington Nationals, in Nippon Professional Baseball (NPB) for the Hokkaido Nippon-Ham Fighters, and in the KBO League for the KT Wiz.

== Amateur career ==
Murphy attended Hamilton High School in his hometown of Chandler, Arizona. In 2012, he underwent Tommy John surgery, and missed the entire 2013 season as a result. He had committed to attend the University of Oregon before being selected in the third round of the 2013 Major League Baseball draft by the Toronto Blue Jays. He signed with the Blue Jays for a $500,000 bonus, and reported to Dunedin, Florida for rehab.

== Professional career ==
=== Toronto Blue Jays ===
Murphy made his professional debut with the Rookie-level Gulf Coast League Blue Jays in 2014. After pitching four innings, he was shut down with hand and arm numbness. It was later determined that one of his ribs was pinching a nerve, and underwent surgery to remove the rib shortly afterward. The numbness persisted, which led doctors to remove a nerve in his pitching elbow, which caused him to miss the entire 2015 season. Fully healthy for 2016, Murphy split time between the Low-A Vancouver Canadians and the Single-A Lansing Lugnuts. He made 21 appearances during the 2016 season, 15 of which were starts, and posted a 4–6 win–loss record, 3.18 earned run average (ERA), and 68 strikeouts in 90 2/3 innings pitched. Murphy made most of his appearances in 2017 for Lansing, and also played in the GCL and for the High-A Dunedin Blue Jays. In total he went 5–4 with a 3.04 ERA and 77 strikeouts in 106 2/3 innings.

Murphy split the 2018 campaign between Dunedin and the Double-A New Hampshire Fisher Cats, posting a cumulative 10-5 record and 2.65 ERA with 141 strikeouts in 152 2/3 innings pitched across 27 starts. The Blue Jays added Murphy to their 40-man roster after the season, in order to protect him from the Rule 5 draft. He spent 2019 back with New Hampshire, registering a 4-7 record and 4.71 ERA with 86 strikeouts across 18 starts.

On September 18, 2020, the Blue Jays promoted Murphy to the major leagues for the first time, and he made his debut against the Philadelphia Phillies. With the 2020 Toronto Blue Jays, Murphy appeared in four games, compiling a 0-0 record with 1.50 ERA and five strikeouts in six innings pitched.

On February 28, 2021, Murphy was placed on the 60-day injured list due to a sprained AC joint in his shoulder. He was activated off of the injured list on June 16. On August 11, Murphy was designated for assignment by the Blue Jays.

=== Washington Nationals ===
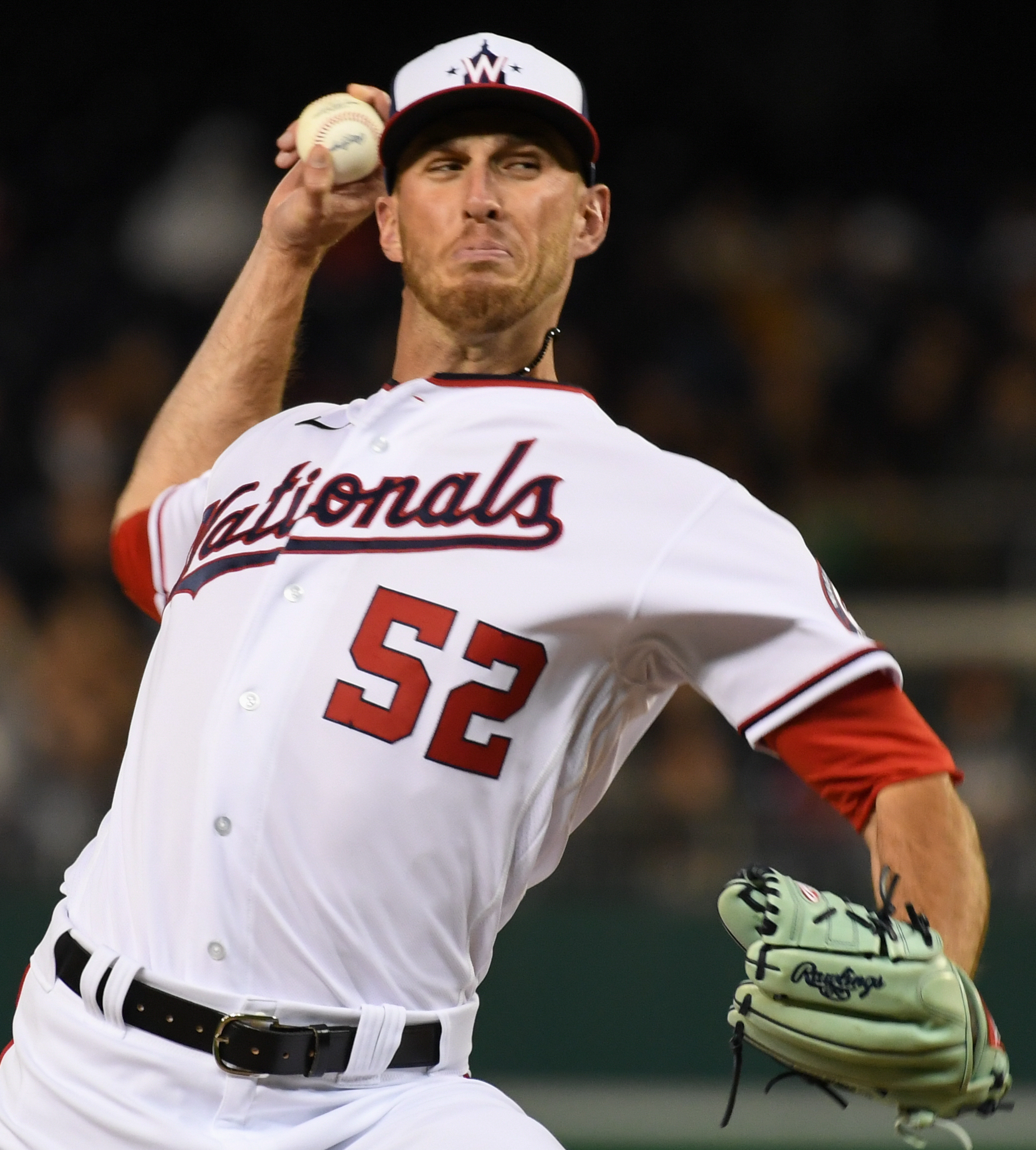
Murphy with the Washington Nationals

The Washington Nationals claimed Murphy off waivers on August 14, 2021, and assigned him to their Triple-A affiliate, the Rochester Red Wings.

Murphy made 6 appearances for Washington in 2022, posting a 6.35 ERA with 4 strikeouts in 5 2/3 innings pitched. He was designated for assignment on April 21, 2022. Murphy cleared waivers and was sent outright to Triple-A Rochester on April 27. He spent the remainder of the year there, making 40 appearances and pitching to a 3-3 record and 5.00 ERA with 73 strikeouts in 63 innings of work. Murphy elected free agency following the season on November 10.

=== Minnesota Twins ===
On December 13, 2022, Murphy signed a minor league deal with the Minnesota Twins with an invite to spring training. He made 42 appearances for the Triple–A St. Paul Saints, compiling a 3.69 ERA with 97 strikeouts and 6 saves across 85 1/3 innings pitched. Murphy elected free agency following the season on November 6, 2023.

=== Hokkaido Nippon-Ham Fighters ===
On November 21, 2023, Murphy signed with the Hokkaido Nippon-Ham Fighters of Nippon Professional Baseball. He made 40 appearances for the Fighters in 2024, compiling a 1–2 record and 3.26 ERA with 30 strikeouts across 38 2/3 innings pitched. On October 15, 2024, the Fighters announced they would not be offering Murphy him a contract for the 2025 season, making him a free agent.

=== Texas Rangers ===
On December 23, 2024, Murphy signed a minor league contract with the Texas Rangers. In 15 appearances split between the Triple-A Round Rock Express and rookie-level Arizona Complex League Rangers, he posted a combined 1-2 record and 3.04 ERA with 17 strikeouts across 23 2/3 innings pitched. Murphy was released by the Rangers organization on July 10, 2025.

=== KT Wiz ===
On July 12, 2025, Murphy signed with KT Wiz of the KBO League. He made 15 appearances (nine starts) for the team, logging a 3-3 record and 3.12 ERA with 45 strikeouts across 60 2/3 innings pitched. Murphy became a free agent following the season.

=== Texas Rangers (second stint) ===
On December 18, 2025, Murphy signed a minor league contract with the Texas Rangers. He made six appearances (including one start) for the Triple–A Round Rock Express, recording a 3.18 ERA with 10 strikeouts across 11 1/3 innings pitched. Murphy was released by the Rangers organization on July 17, 2026.
