= Jonathan Davis (baseball) =

American baseball player (born 1992)

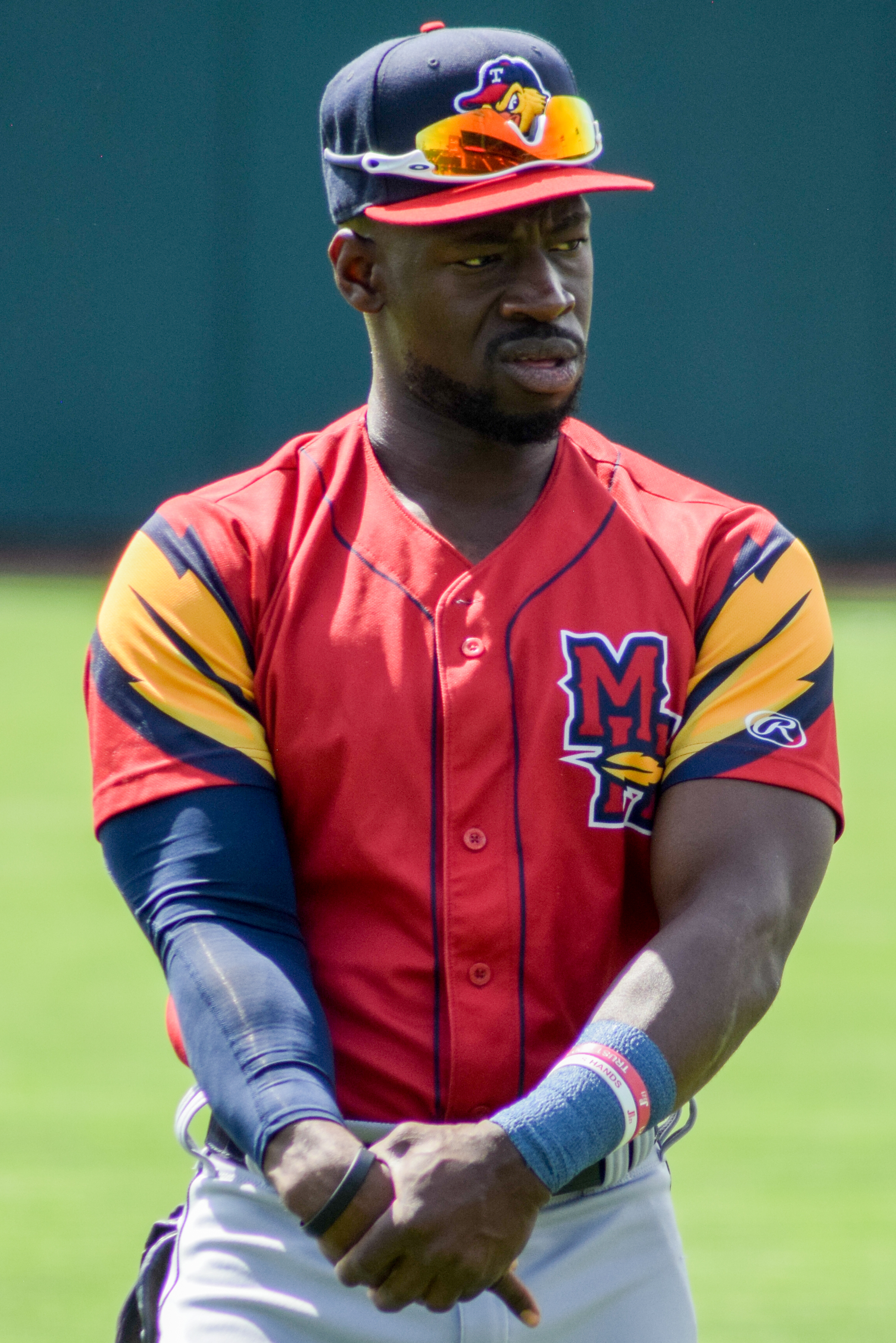
- Davis with the Toledo Mud Hens in 2023
- Outfielder
- Born: May 12, 1992 (age 33); Camden, Arkansas, U.S.
- Batted: Right Threw: Right

MLB debut
- September 5, 2018, for the Toronto Blue Jays

Last MLB appearance
- July 4, 2023, for the Miami Marlins

MLB statistics
- Batting average: .198
- Home runs: 6
- Runs batted in: 30
- Stats at Baseball Reference

Teams
- Toronto Blue Jays (2018–2021); New York Yankees (2021); Milwaukee Brewers (2022); Miami Marlins (2023)

Jonathan Rayshad Davis (born May 12, 1992) is an American former professional baseball outfielder. He played in Major League Baseball (MLB) for the Toronto Blue Jays, New York Yankees, Milwaukee Brewers, and Miami Marlins.

== High school and college ==
Davis attended Camden Fairview High School in Camden, Arkansas. As a senior, he recorded a .419 batting average with three home runs and 19 stolen bases. Undrafted out of high school, he then attended the University of Central Arkansas, and played baseball for the Central Arkansas Bears for three seasons. In his freshman season, Davis batted .350 with five home runs, 30 runs batted in (RBI), and 21 stolen bases. As a sophomore, he hit .333 with 29 RBI and 17 stolen bases. In his third and final season with the Bears, Davis hit .268 with three home runs, 49 RBI, and 25 stolen bases.

== Professional career ==
=== Toronto Blue Jays ===
The Toronto Blue Jays selected Davis in the 15th round of the 2013 Major League Baseball draft. He was assigned to the Rookie Advanced Bluefield Blue Jays for the remainder of the year, and hit .238 with two home runs and 14 RBI in 43 games. Injuries limited Davis to 28 games in 2014, mostly with the Low-A Vancouver Canadians. He began the 2015 season with the Single-A Lansing Lugnuts, and was promoted to the High-A Dunedin Blue Jays after hitting .408 in 13 games. With Dunedin, Davis appeared in 47 games and hit .230 with one home run and 14 RBI. Davis would then spend the entire 2016 campaign with Dunedin, hitting .252 and establishing career-highs in home runs (14), RBI (54), and stolen bases (33). During the offseason, Davis played in 14 games for the Indios de Mayagüez of the Puerto Rican Winter League.

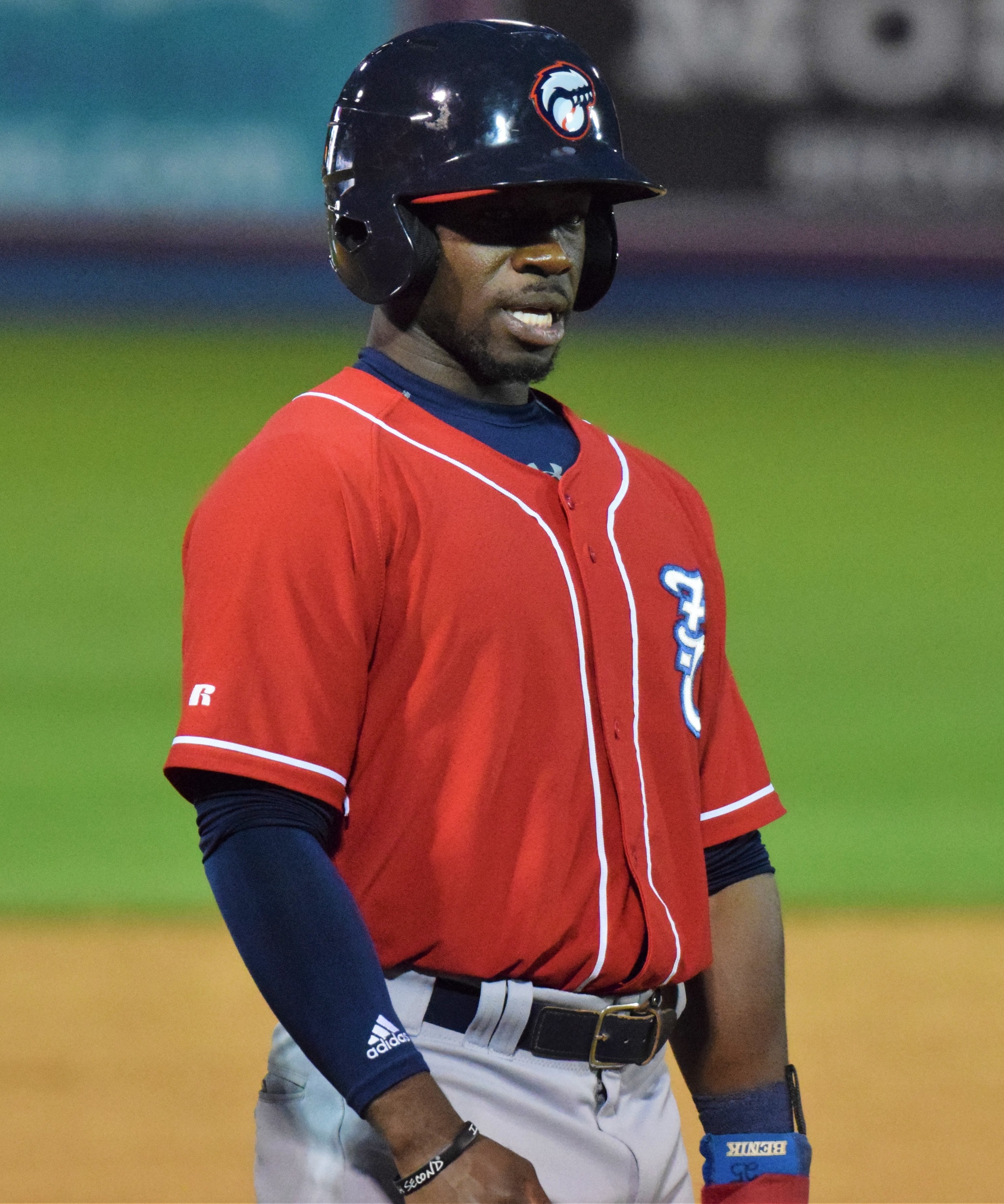
Davis with the New Hampshire Fisher Cats in 2018

Davis played the entire 2017 season with the Double-A New Hampshire Fisher Cats, hitting .249 with 10 home runs, 45 RBI, and 20 stolen bases in 128 games. Playing in the offseason for the second consecutive season, he appeared in 21 games for the Peoria Javelinas of the Arizona Fall League (AFL), and helped the team win the AFL championship. Davis opened the 2018 season with New Hampshire. On June 26, he recorded the first cycle in Fisher Cats franchise history. Davis hit .302 with five home runs, 33 RBI, and 19 stolen bases in 78 games with New Hampshire before he was promoted to the Triple-A Buffalo Bisons in July.

On September 4, Davis was called up by the Blue Jays. He hit his first base hit on September 12 against the Red Sox.

Davis started the 2019 season in Buffalo, but was called up on May 10. Davis hit his first major league home run on May 27 against Hunter Wood in an 8–3 loss to the Tampa Bay Rays. He ended the season hitting .181 in 37 games.

Davis made a fantastic leaping catch to rob a home run in the last game of the 2020 regular season, and it was considered to be a potential "catch of the year". Overall with the 2020 Blue Jays, Davis batted .259 with 1 home run and 6 RBIs in 13 games.

On July 30, 2021, Davis was designated for assignment by the Blue Jays following the acquisition of Joakim Soria.

=== New York Yankees ===
On August 3, 2021, Davis was claimed off of waivers by the New York Yankees. On August 10, 2021, Davis scored his first Yankees run. On September 9, 2021, the Yankees designated Davis for assignment. He was outrighted to the Triple-A Scranton/Wilkes-Barre RailRiders two days later. Davis became a free agent following the season.

=== Milwaukee Brewers ===
On November 18, 2021, Davis signed a minor league deal with the Milwaukee Brewers with an invitation to spring training. He began the 2022 season with the Triple–A Nashville Sounds, playing in 48 games and hitting .294/.396/.429 with 4 home runs, 22 RBI, and 14 stolen bases. On June 18, 2022, Davis had his contract selected to the major league roster. In 37 games for Milwaukee, Davis batted .224/.344/.237 with no home runs, 4 RBI, and 7 stolen bases. On September 26, Davis was removed from the 40-man roster and sent outright to Triple–A Nashville. He elected free agency following the season on October 6.

=== Detroit Tigers ===
On January 30, 2023, Davis signed a minor league contract with the Detroit Tigers organization. Playing in 36 games for the Triple-A Toledo Mud Hens, Davis hit .258/.336/.516 with 5 home runs, 20 RBI, and 5 stolen bases.

=== Miami Marlins ===
On May 22, 2023, Davis was traded to the Miami Marlins in exchange for Brady Allen. The next day, Davis was selected to the major league roster. In 34 games for the Marlins, he batted .244/.307/.378 with 2 home runs and 10 RBI. In a July 4 game against the St. Louis Cardinals, Davis suffered a right knee contusion after banging his knee on the outfield turf attempting to catch a Tommy Edman line drive. The next day, he was placed on the injured list after an MRI revealed a right knee sprain. After undergoing surgery on July 6, manager Skip Schumaker announced that he would miss 3-6 months, likely ending his season. Following the season on October 31, Davis was removed from the 40–man roster and sent outright to the Triple–A Jacksonville Jumbo Shrimp. However, Davis rejected the assignment and elected free agency on November 3.

On January 8, 2024, Davis re–signed with the Marlins on a minor league contract. In 73 games for Triple–A Jacksonville, he batted .227/.342/.335 with four home runs, 19 RBI, and eight stolen bases. Davis was released by the Marlins organization on August 2.

== Coaching career ==
Prior to the 2025 season, Davis was named assistant hitting coach of the Dunedin Blue Jays, the Single-A affiliate of the Toronto Blue Jays.

During the 2025 season he was promoted to being hitting coach of the Vancouver Canadians the High-A affiliate of the Toronto Blue Jays.
