= Danny Jansen =

American baseball player (born 1995)

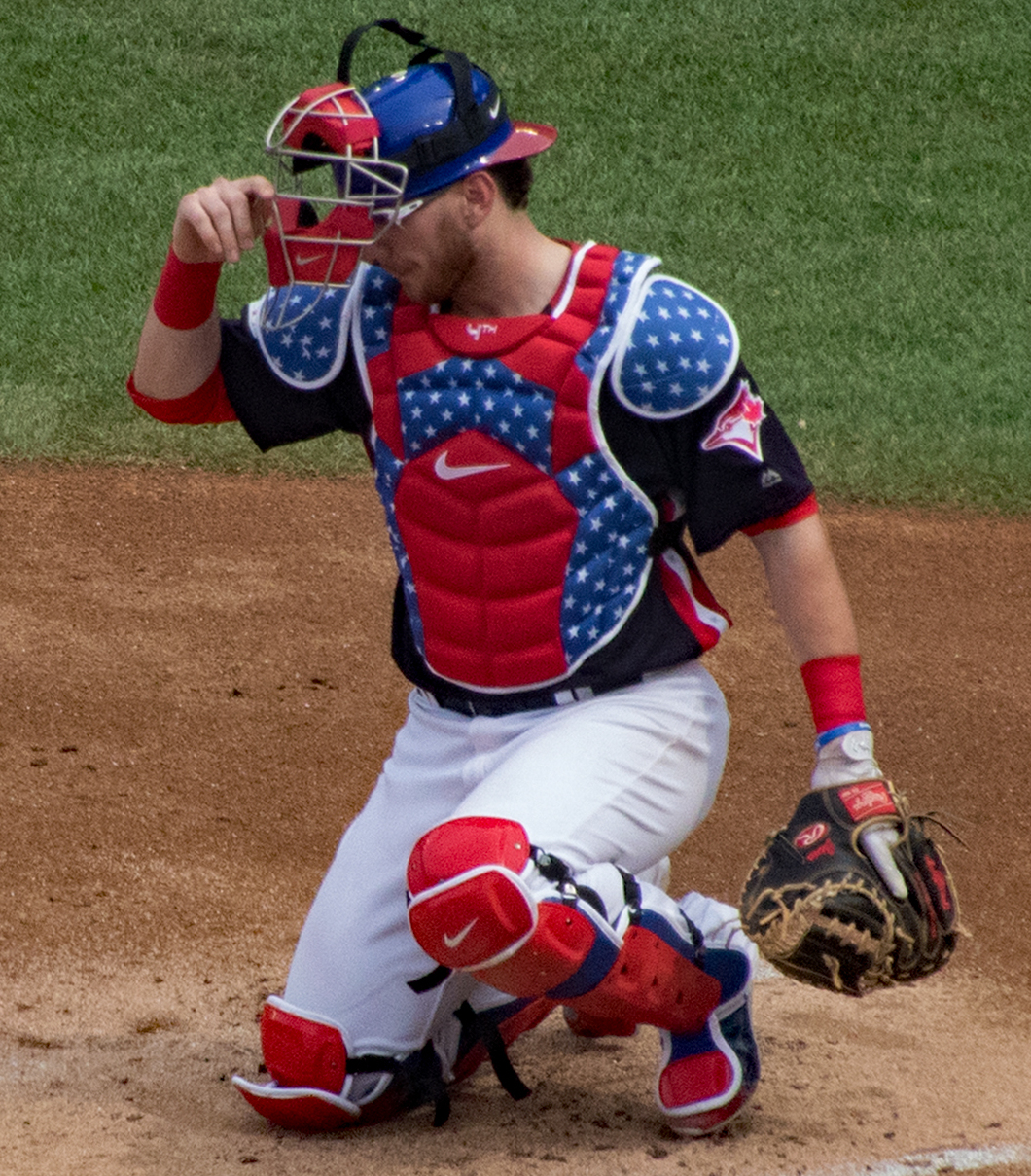
- Jansen at the 2018 All-Star Futures Game

Texas Rangers – No. 9
- Catcher
- Born: April 15, 1995 (age 31); Elmhurst, Illinois, U.S.
- Bats: Right Throws: Right

MLB debut
- August 13, 2018, for the Toronto Blue Jays

MLB statistics (through 2026 season)
- Batting average: .218
- Home runs: 96
- Runs batted in: 282
- Stats at Baseball Reference

Teams
- Toronto Blue Jays (2018–2024); Boston Red Sox (2024); Tampa Bay Rays (2025); Milwaukee Brewers (2025); Texas Rangers (2026–present)

Daniel Robert Jansen (born April 15, 1995) is an American professional baseball catcher for the Texas Rangers of Major League Baseball (MLB). He has previously played in MLB for the Toronto Blue Jays, Boston Red Sox, Tampa Bay Rays, and Milwaukee Brewers. He made his MLB debut in 2018 with the Blue Jays.

He is the only MLB player to play for both teams in the same game.

== Professional career ==
=== Toronto Blue Jays ===
==== Minor leagues ====
Jansen attended Appleton West High School in Appleton, Wisconsin, and was drafted by the Blue Jays in the 16th round of the 2013 Major League Baseball draft. He had committed to play college baseball at Jacksonville University, but signed with the Blue Jays instead. He was assigned to the Rookie-level Gulf Coast League Blue Jays for the season, appearing in 36 games and hitting .246 with 18 runs batted in (RBI). He showed above-average plate discipline that season, walking 21 times while striking out only 10 times. In 2014, Jansen was promoted to the Rookie Advanced Bluefield Blue Jays. In 38 games, he batted .282 with five home runs and 17 RBI. Jansen was assigned to the Single–A Lansing Lugnuts in 2015, but spent more than half the season on the disabled list. After a seven-game rehab stint in the Gulf Coast League, Jansen rejoined the Lugnuts in August. In 53 total games, he hit .210 with five home runs and 30 RBI.

Jansen was invited to Major League spring training on January 12, 2016, and reassigned to minor league camp on March 12. He was assigned to the High–A Dunedin Blue Jays for the 2016 minor league season. In 57 total games, Jansen hit .218 with one home run and 25 RBI in 2016. After the 2016 season, the Blue Jays assigned Jansen to the Mesa Solar Sox of the Arizona Fall League. He appeared in 20 games for the Sox and hit .282 with 11 RBI and the first two triples of his professional career.

Prior to the start of the 2017 season, Jansen found he was having vision problems, and began wearing glasses on and off the field. The glasses paid immediate dividends, as Jansen hit .369 with five home runs and 18 RBI in 31 games for Dunedin before being promoted to the Double–A New Hampshire Fisher Cats. He played in 52 games for New Hampshire and hit .291 before being promoted to the Triple–A Buffalo Bisons in August. With Buffalo, Jansen hit .328 with three home runs and 10 RBI in 21 games. On November 20, 2017, the Blue Jays added Jansen to their 40-man roster to protect him from the Rule 5 draft. Heading into the 2018 season, Jansen was named the eighth-best catching prospect by MLB. He played in the All-Star Futures Game in July, during which he hit a home run.

==== Major leagues ====
The Blue Jays promoted Jansen to the major leagues for the first time on August 12, 2018. He made his debut the following night, recording two singles in a 3–1 loss to the Kansas City Royals. He and Sean Reid-Foley became the first batterymates to debut in the same American League game since Billy Rohr and Russ Gibson did so in April 1967. Jansen hit his first major league home run on August 14 off Royals pitcher Heath Fillmyer, breaking a 3–3 tie in a game the Blue Jays would end up winning 6–5. He finished the season hitting .247 in 31 games.

Overall with the 2020 Blue Jays, Jansen batted .182 with six home runs and 20 RBI in 43 games. During Game 2 of the AL Wild Card Series against the Tampa Bay Rays, Jansen became the second Blue Jays player in franchise history with a multi-home run game in the postseason.

The 2021 season saw Jansen playing 70 games, splitting playing time with catcher Reese McGuire. Jansen spent time on the injured list in July and August with a right hamstring strain, but returned to the lineup to play the last 21 games of the season with a .322 batting average and seven home runs.

Jansen's 2022 season began strong before a left oblique injury in April sidelined him for over a month. On June 6, Jansen was again placed on the IL after suffering a fracture in his left pinky finger after being hit by a 96-mile-per-hour (154 km/h) pitch during a game against the Kansas City Royals.

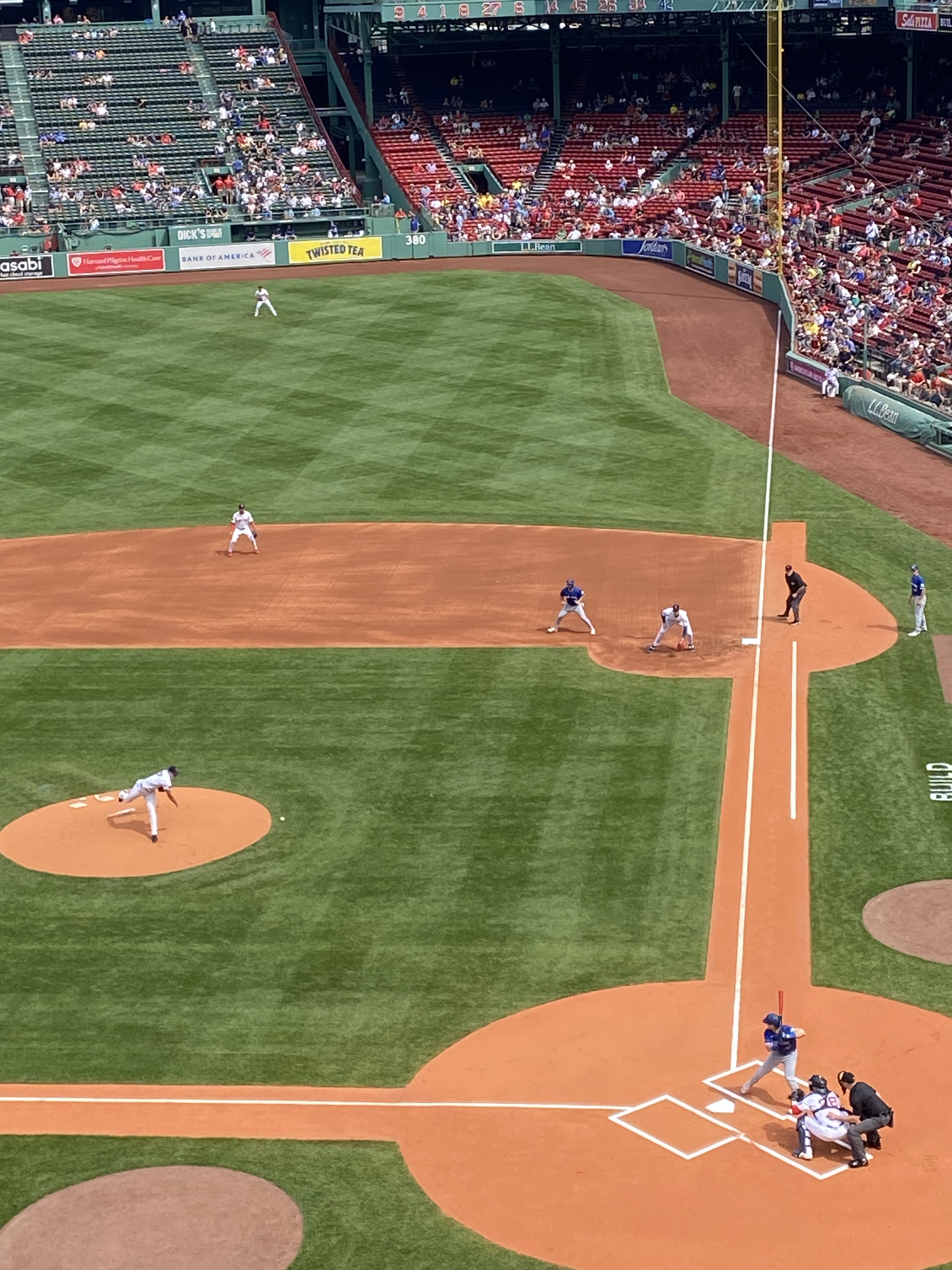
Jansen catching, with Daulton Varsho batting, at Fenway Park during the August 26 resumption of the suspended game of June 26, 2024

On July 22, 2022, the Blue Jays set a franchise record for runs scored in a game with a 28–5 win over the Boston Red Sox at Fenway Park. Jansen hit two home runs over the Green Monster in left field, scored four times, and contributed six RBIs. He played in 72 games for Toronto in 2022, batting .260/.339/.516 with career–highs in home runs (15) and RBI (44).

On January 13, 2023, Jansen signed a one-year, $3.5 million contract with the Blue Jays, avoiding salary arbitration. On September 1, Jansen suffered a fractured right middle finger after he was hit by a foul tip. On September 8, he underwent surgery to insert a pin into his finger, ending his season. Jansen finished the year playing in 86 games and hitting .228/.312/.474 with new career–highs in home runs (17) and RBI (53).

Jansen again avoided arbitration prior to the 2024 season, as he agreed to a one-year deal for $5.2 million.

=== Boston Red Sox ===
On July 27, 2024, Jansen was traded to the Boston Red Sox in exchange for minor leaguers Cutter Coffey, Eddinson Paulino, and Gilberto Batista. Jansen was added to Boston's active roster the next day.

==== Playing for both teams in the same game ====
The June 26, 2024, game between the Blue Jays and the Red Sox was suspended due to rain in the second inning, with Jansen batting for the Blue Jays at the time. When the game resumed on August 26, Jansen, now a member of the Red Sox's active roster, became the first player in MLB history to play for both teams in the same game. Jansen re-entered the game as the Red Sox's catcher, with the Blue Jays' Daulton Varsho pinch hitting in Jansen's slot in the Blue Jays' batting order. After Varsho struck out in the top half of the second inning, Jansen came to bat in the bottom half of the same inning, lining out to first base.

=== Tampa Bay Rays ===
On December 12, 2024, Jansen signed a one-year, $8.5 million contract with the Tampa Bay Rays. Jansen made 73 appearances for Tampa Bay during the 2025 season, slashing .204/.314/.389 with 11 home runs and 29 RBI.

=== Milwaukee Brewers ===
On July 28, 2025, the Rays traded Jansen to the Milwaukee Brewers in exchange for Jadher Areinamo. In 25 appearances for Milwaukee, he batted .254/.346/.433 with three home runs and seven RBI. The Brewers declined Jansen's 2026 option on November 3, making him a free agent.

=== Texas Rangers ===
On December 15, 2025, Jansen signed a two-year, $14.55 million contract with the Texas Rangers. On June 6, 2026, Jansen was placed on the injured list with a right forearm strain. He was transferred to the 60–day injured list on July 29, and was activated on August 18.

== Personal life ==
Jansen is the son of parents Steve and Kathy. He has an older brother, Matthew. In his youth, Jansen's family hosted players for the then-Seattle Mariners Single–A affiliate Wisconsin Timber Rattlers. In 2004, Adam Jones was housed by the Jansen family.

Jansen and his wife Alexis were married in January 2022 with former teammate Rowdy Tellez as the officiant. Their son was born in October 2022.
