= Derek Fisher (baseball) =

American baseball player (born 1993)

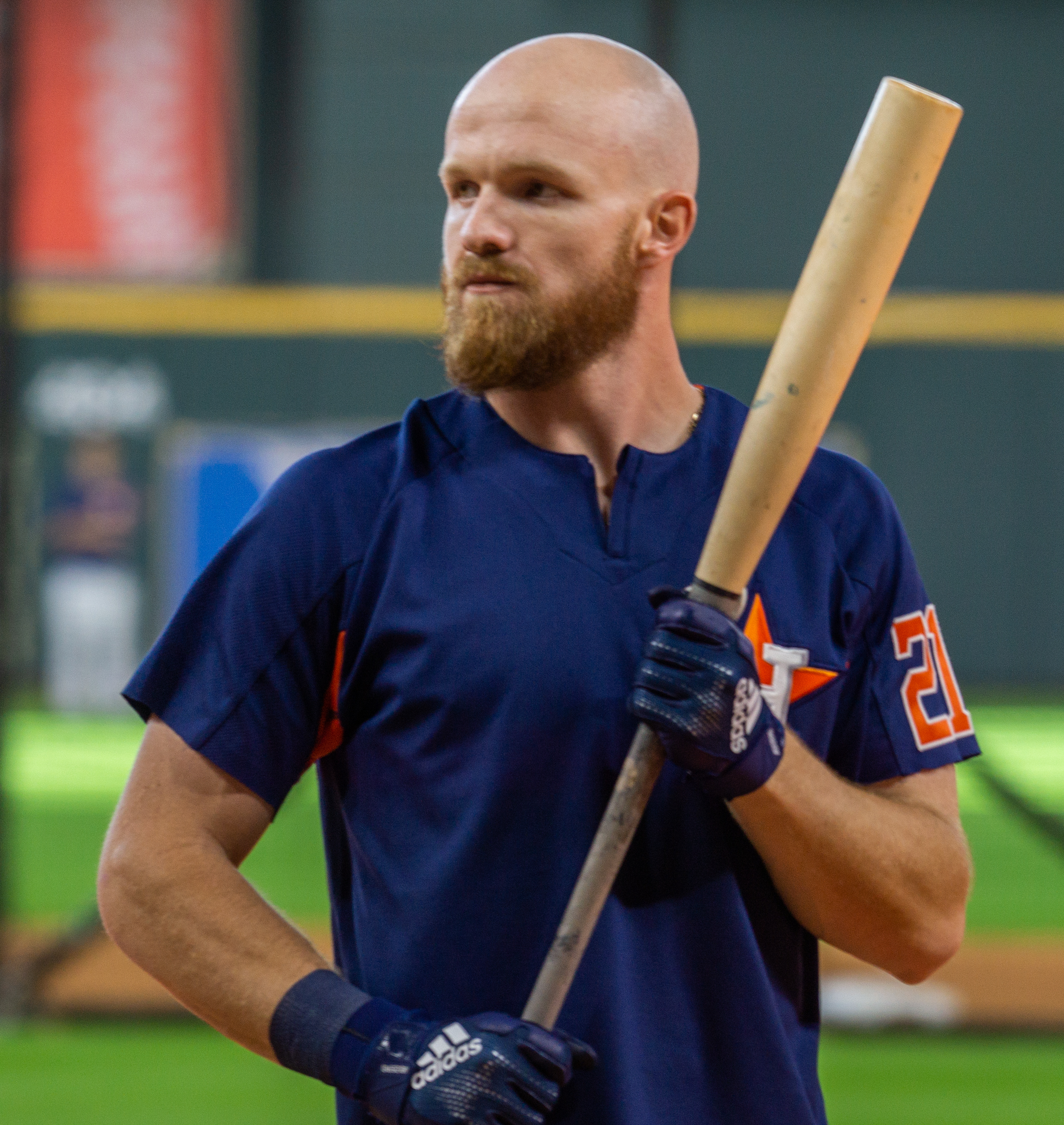
- Fisher with the Houston Astros
- Outfielder
- Born: August 21, 1993 (age 32); Lebanon, Pennsylvania, U.S.
- Batted: Left Threw: Right

MLB debut
- June 14, 2017, for the Houston Astros

Last MLB appearance
- June 21, 2021, for the Milwaukee Brewers

MLB statistics
- Batting average: .195
- Home runs: 17
- Runs batted in: 53
- Stats at Baseball Reference

Teams
- Houston Astros (2017–2019); Toronto Blue Jays (2019–2020); Milwaukee Brewers (2021)

Career highlights and awards
- World Series champion (2017)

Derek Joseph Fisher (born August 21, 1993) is an American former professional baseball outfielder. He played in Major League Baseball (MLB) for the Houston Astros, Toronto Blue Jays, and Milwaukee Brewers. He played college baseball for the Virginia Cavaliers.

== Amateur career ==
Fisher attended Cedar Crest High School in Lebanon, Pennsylvania. Playing for the school's baseball team, Fisher had a .440 batting average with nine home runs in his junior year, and was named to the all-state's first team. Baseball America ranked Fisher as the ninth-best high school prospect and best Pennsylvania prospect available in the 2011 Major League Baseball draft. As a senior, he batted .484 with 11 home runs and 28 runs batted in (RBIs), and was named the Gatorade Player of the Year for Pennsylvania. He was selected by the Texas Rangers in the sixth round of the draft, but did not sign. He enrolled at the University of Virginia to play college baseball for the Virginia Cavaliers baseball team.

As a freshman, Fisher batted .288 with seven home runs and 50 RBIs, and was named a Freshman All-American by Louisville Slugger and invited to participate in the College Home Run Derby. In 2013, he played collegiate summer baseball with the Harwich Mariners of the Cape Cod Baseball League, and was named a league all-star. Fisher was named a preseason All-American in 2014. In February 2014, he was named the Atlantic Coast Conference Player of the Week. On March 17, 2014, Fisher had surgery to remove a hamate bone from his right wrist, which caused him to miss 25 games of the 2014 season.

== Professional career ==
=== Houston Astros ===
The Houston Astros selected Fisher with the 37th overall selection in the 2014 MLB draft. He signed with the Astros, receiving a $1.5 million signing bonus, and began his professional career with the Tri-City ValleyCats of the Low-A New York–Penn League. He batted .303 in 41 games for Tri-City, and was assigned to the Quad Cities River Bandits of the Single-A Midwest League to start the 2015 season. After he hit .305 with six home runs and 24 RBI in 39 games, the Astros promoted Fisher to the Lancaster JetHawks of the High-A California League. Fisher hit three home runs, including two grand slams, as he recorded a California League record 12 RBI in his first game for Lancaster.

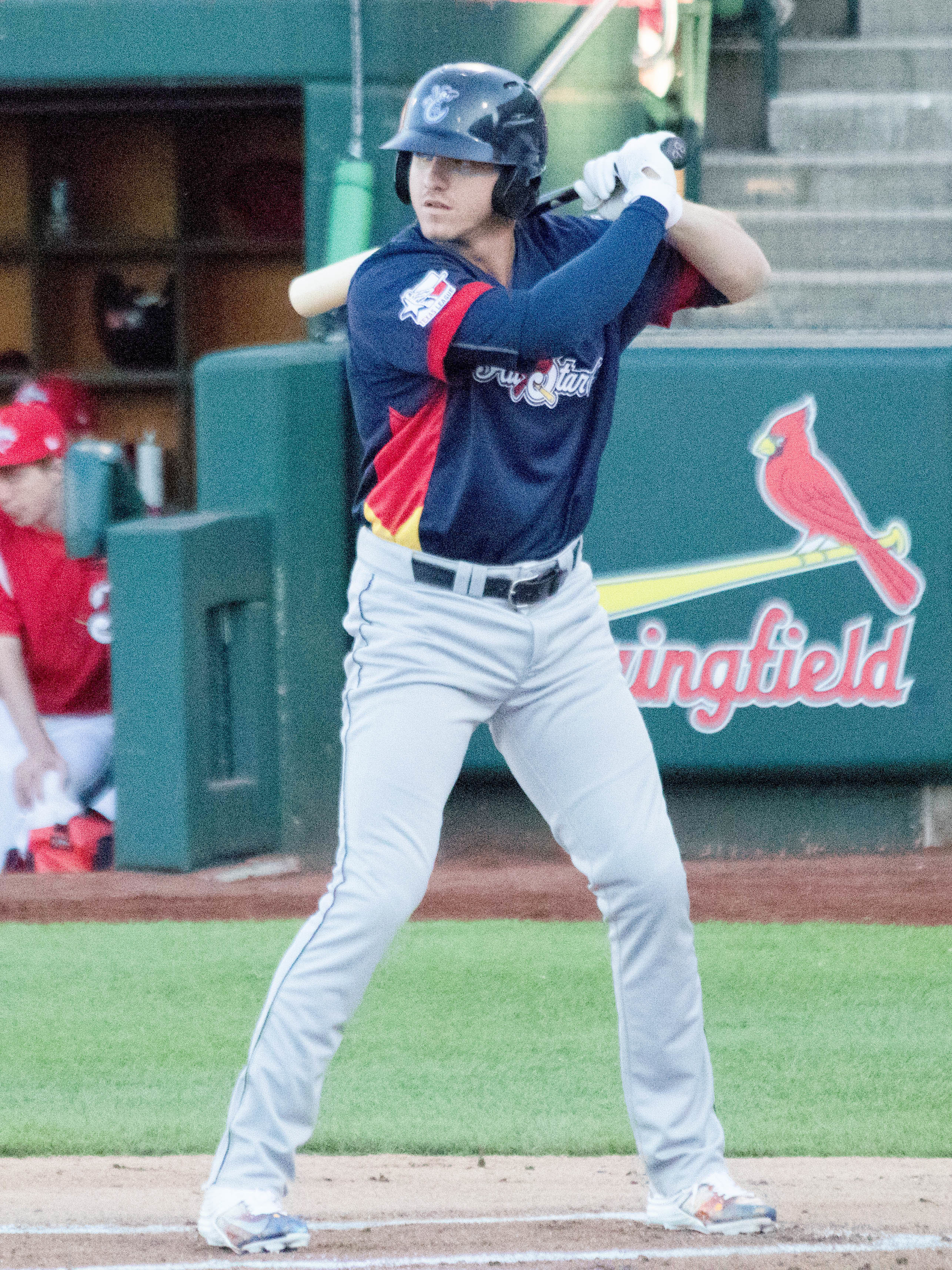
Fisher in 2016

Fisher began the 2016 season with the Corpus Christi Hooks of the Double-A Texas League. After he batted .245 with 16 home runs, 23 stolen bases, and 59 RBI in 371 at-bats for Corpus Christi, the Astros promoted Fisher to the Fresno Grizzlies of the Triple-A Pacific Coast League in August. The Astros invited Fisher to spring training as a non-roster player in 2017. He began the 2017 season with Fresno.

The Astros promoted Fisher to the major leagues on June 14, 2017. In his first game, he collected his first two hits, the first being a home run. In addition, the two hits came the same inning, making him the first player to do so since Adam LaRoche in 2004. He ended the day 2-for-3, and added two walks. He collected his first career stolen base the following game at home against the Boston Red Sox. The Astros optioned Fisher to the minor leagues, and he was selected to appear in the All-Star Futures Game.

Fisher made the Astros' playoff roster, appearing primarily as a pinch runner. On October 30, in a game that started on October 29, he scored the game winning run in Game 5 of the 2017 World Series. The Astros would win the series in 7 games.

On March 24, 2018, the Astros announced that Fisher had made their Opening Day roster. He struggled offensively and was ultimately demoted to the Triple-A Fresno Grizzlies, hitting .165 with four home runs, 11 RBI, and an OPS of .602 in 42 MLB games. In 2019, Fisher appeared in only 17 games with the Astros, hitting .226 with an OPS of .675 through the end of July.

=== Toronto Blue Jays ===
On July 31, 2019, the Astros traded Fisher to the Toronto Blue Jays in exchange for Aaron Sanchez, Joe Biagini, and Cal Stevenson. He hit .161 with six home runs in 40 games for Toronto.

With the 2020 Blue Jays, Fisher batted .226 with one home run and seven RBI in 16 games. On February 11, 2021, Fisher was designated for assignment by the Blue Jays after the team signed David Phelps.

=== Milwaukee Brewers ===
On February 15, 2021, the Blue Jays traded Fisher to the Milwaukee Brewers for a player to be named later and cash. In May, the Brewers sent Paxton Schultz to the Blue Jays to complete the trade. Fisher went 2-for-8 in 4 games with Milwaukee before being designated for assignment on June 22. He was outrighted to the Triple-A Nashville Sounds on June 28.

=== Minnesota Twins ===
On December 16, 2021, Fisher signed a minor league contract with the Minnesota Twins. He made 27 appearances for the Triple-A St. Paul Saints, batting .158/.259/.305 with three home runs and 11 RBI. Fisher was released by the Twins organization on June 11, 2022.
