= Thomas Hatch =

American baseball player (born 1994)

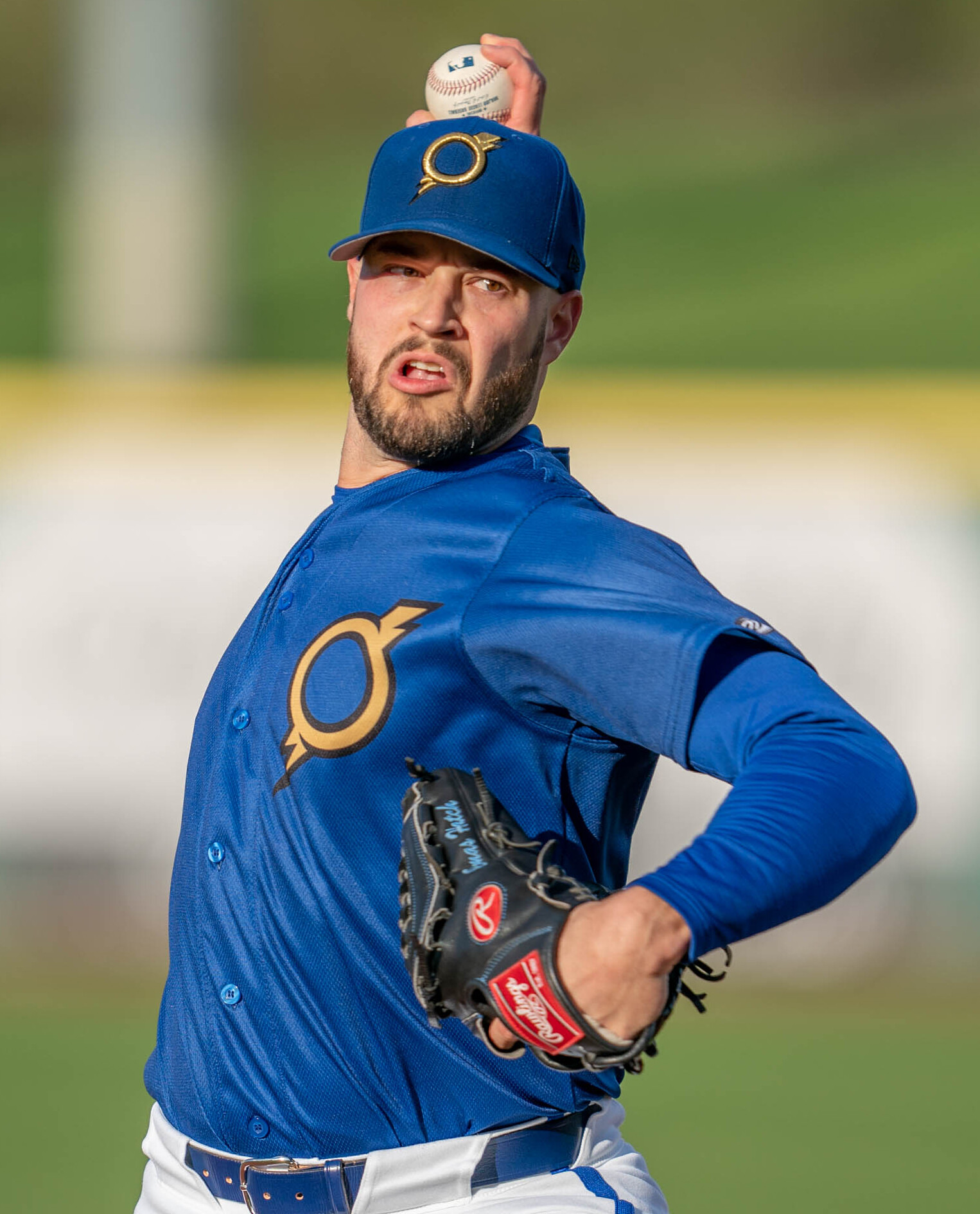
- Hatch with the Omaha Storm Chasers in 2025

SSG Landers – No. 55
- Pitcher
- Born: September 29, 1994 (age 31); Tulsa, Oklahoma, U.S.
- Bats: Right Throws: Right

Professional debut
- MLB: July 26, 2020, for the Toronto Blue Jays
- NPB: April 6, 2024, for the Hiroshima Toyo Carp
- KBO: June 14, 2026, for the SSG Landers

MLB statistics (through 2025 season)
- Win–loss record: 6–5
- Earned run average: 5.24
- Strikeouts: 83

NPB statistics (through 2024 season)
- Win–loss record: 0–3
- Earned run average: 7.36
- Strikeouts: 18

KBO statistics (through July 30, 2026)
- Win–loss record: 2-4
- Earned run average: 6.02
- Strikeouts: 38
- Stats at Baseball Reference

Teams
- Toronto Blue Jays (2020–2023); Pittsburgh Pirates (2023); Hiroshima Toyo Carp (2024); Kansas City Royals (2025); Minnesota Twins (2025); SSG Landers (2026–present)

John Thomas Hatch (born September 29, 1994) is an American professional baseball pitcher for the SSG Landers of the KBO League. He has previously played in Major League Baseball (MLB) for the Toronto Blue Jays, Pittsburgh Pirates, Kansas City Royals, and Minnesota Twins, and in Nippon Professional Baseball (NPB) for the Hiroshima Toyo Carp.

== Career ==
=== Amateur career ===
Hatch attended Jenks High School in Jenks, Oklahoma. As a junior, he had a win–loss record of 7–2 with a 1.60 earned run average (ERA). He was not drafted out of high school in the 2013 MLB draft, and he enrolled at Oklahoma State University and pitched for the Oklahoma State Cowboys. He pursued a degree in accounting. In 2014, he played collegiate summer baseball with the Bourne Braves of the Cape Cod Baseball League. He did not pitch in 2015 due to a sprained ulnar collateral ligament of the elbow, which did not require surgery. He pitched extensively in 2016, as Oklahoma State reached the 2016 College World Series. In 2016, his junior year, Hatch went 9–3 with a 2.14 ERA in 19 starts, winning the Big 12 Conference Baseball Pitcher of the Year Award.

=== Chicago Cubs ===
The Chicago Cubs selected Hatch in the third round, with the 104th overall selection, of the 2016 MLB draft. He signed with the Cubs, receiving a $573,900 signing bonus. He did not pitch in 2016 after signing. He made his professional debut in 2017 with the Myrtle Beach Pelicans of the Class A-Advanced Carolina League, posting a 5–11 record with a 4.04 ERA in 26 starts.

Hatch spent the 2018 season with the Tennessee Smokies of the Class AA Southern League, earning Southern League All-Star honors and compiling an 8–6 record with a 3.82 ERA in 26 starts. He returned to Tennessee to start the 2019 season.

=== Toronto Blue Jays ===
On July 30, 2019, the Cubs traded Hatch to the Toronto Blue Jays in exchange for David Phelps. He was assigned to the New Hampshire Fisher Cats, with whom he finished the year. Over 27 starts between Tennessee and New Hampshire, he pitched to a 6–13 record with a 4.12 ERA.

Hatch was added to the Blue Jays 40-man roster after the 2019 season. On July 26, 2020, he made his MLB debut. With the 2020 Toronto Blue Jays, Hatch appeared in 17 games, compiling a 3–1 record with 2.73 ERA and 23 strikeouts in 26.1 innings pitched.

On April 22, 2021, Hatch was placed on the 60-day injured list due to right elbow inflammation. He was activated from the injured list on July 6. He made only 3 appearances for Toronto in 2021, spending the majority of the year in Buffalo. Hatch made 28 appearances (22 starts) for Triple-A Buffalo in 2022, posting an 8–7 record and 4.67 ERA with 113 strikeouts in 131.0 innings pitched. In one start for the Blue Jays, Hatch allowed a ghastly 10 runs on 12 hits and 2 walks in 4.2 innings of work.

Hatch was optioned to Triple-A Buffalo to begin the 2023 season. In 6 games for Toronto, he posted a 4.26 ERA with 10 strikeouts in 6 1/3 innings pitched. On August 4, 2023, Hatch was designated for assignment by the Blue Jays.

=== Pittsburgh Pirates ===
On August 6, 2023, Hatch was claimed off waivers by the Pittsburgh Pirates. In 12 games for the Pirates, he registered a 4.03 ERA with 16 strikeouts in 22 1/3 innings of work. Hatch was released by Pittsburgh on November 30 to pursue an opportunity overseas.

=== Hiroshima Toyo Carp ===
On December 3, 2023, Hatch signed with the Hiroshima Toyo Carp of Nippon Professional Baseball. He made 5 appearances for the Carp in 2024, struggling to an 0–3 record and 7.46 ERA with 18 strikeouts over 22 innings pitched. On November 8, 2024, the Carp announced they would not retain Hatch for the 2025 season, making him a free agent.

=== Kansas City Royals ===
On November 18, 2024, Hatch signed with the Doosan Bears of the KBO League. However, the contract was voided on December 18, due to concerns over Hatch's physical. On February 7, 2025, Hatch signed a minor league contract with the Kansas City Royals. On June 5, the Royals selected Hatch's contract, adding him to their active roster. He went unused in the first game of the team's doubleheader, and was designated for assignment prior to the second game. Hatch cleared waivers and was sent outright to the Triple-A Omaha Storm Chasers on June 8. On July 29, the Royals added Hatch back to their active roster. After allowing two runs in one inning during his only appearance, Hatch was designated for assignment by the Royals on August 2.

=== Minnesota Twins ===
On August 4, 2025, Hatch was claimed off waivers by the Minnesota Twins. In 11 appearances for the Twins, he posted a 2-1 record and 5.45 ERA with 21 strikeouts over 33 innings of work. On November 6, Hatch was removed from the 40-man roster and sent outright to the Triple-A St. Paul Saints; he subsequently rejected the assignment and elected free agency.

=== Arizona Diamondbacks ===
On January 8, 2026, Hatch signed a minor league contract with the Arizona Diamondbacks. He made 11 starts for the Triple-A Reno Aces, compiling a 2-0 record and 4.01 ERA with 34 strikeouts across 51 2/3 innings pitched. Hatch was released by the Diamondbacks organization on June 4.

=== SSG Landers ===
On June 6, 2026, Hatch signed with the SSG Landers of the KBO League as an injury replacement for Mitch White.
