= Shun Yamaguchi =

Japanese baseball player (born 1987)

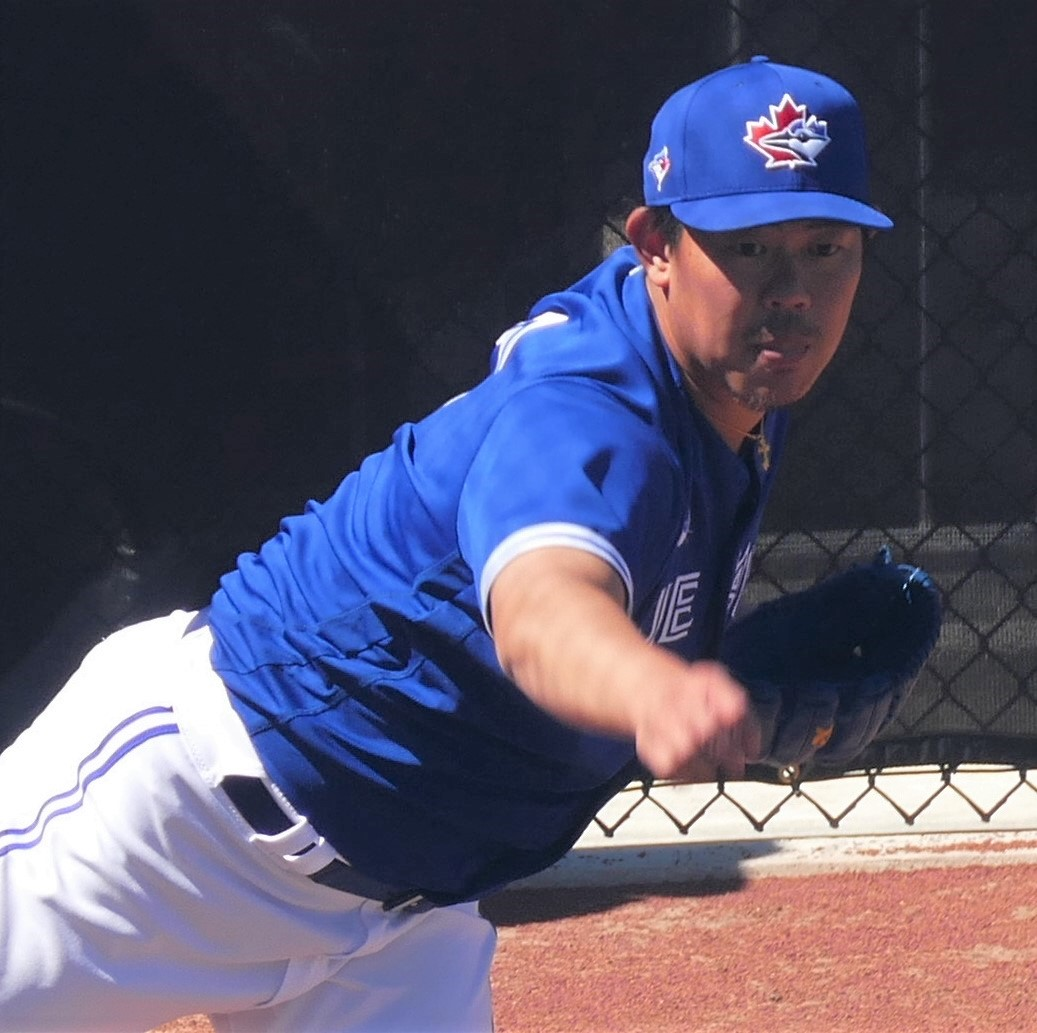
- Yamaguchi with the Toronto Blue Jays in 2020
- Pitcher
- Born: July 11, 1987 (age 39); Ōita, Japan
- Batted: Right Threw: Right

Professional debut
- NPB: June 29, 2006, for the Yokohama BayStars
- MLB: July 26, 2020, for the Toronto Blue Jays

Last appearance
- NPB: April 8, 2022, for the Yomiuri Giants
- MLB: September 28, 2020, for the Toronto Blue Jays

NPB statistics
- Win–loss record: 66–66
- Earned run average: 3.36
- Strikeouts: 1,140

MLB statistics
- Win–loss record: 2–4
- Earned run average: 8.06
- Strikeouts: 26
- Stats at Baseball Reference

Teams
- Yokohama BayStars/Yokohama DeNA BayStars (2006–2016); Yomiuri Giants (2017–2019); Toronto Blue Jays (2020); Yomiuri Giants (2021–2022)

Career highlights and awards
- NPB: 4× NPB All-Star (2010, 2011, 2016, 2019); Pitched a no-hitter on July 27, 2018; Wins leader (2019); Strikeout leader (2019); Best Nine Award (2019)
Medals
Men's baseball
Representing Japan
WBSC Premier12
Gold medal – first place	2019 Tokyo	Team

Shun Yamaguchi (山口 俊, Yamaguchi Shun; born July 11, 1987) is a Japanese former professional baseball pitcher. He played in Nippon Professional Baseball (NPB) for the Yokohama BayStars/Yokohama DeNA BayStars and Yomiuri Giants, and in Major League Baseball (MLB) for the Toronto Blue Jays.

He is the first Japanese player to make his MLB debut with the Blue Jays, and also the first MLB player who had never played for any baseball teams in the United States. All previous Japanese players who were on the Blue Jays had already debuted for other MLB teams.

== Career ==
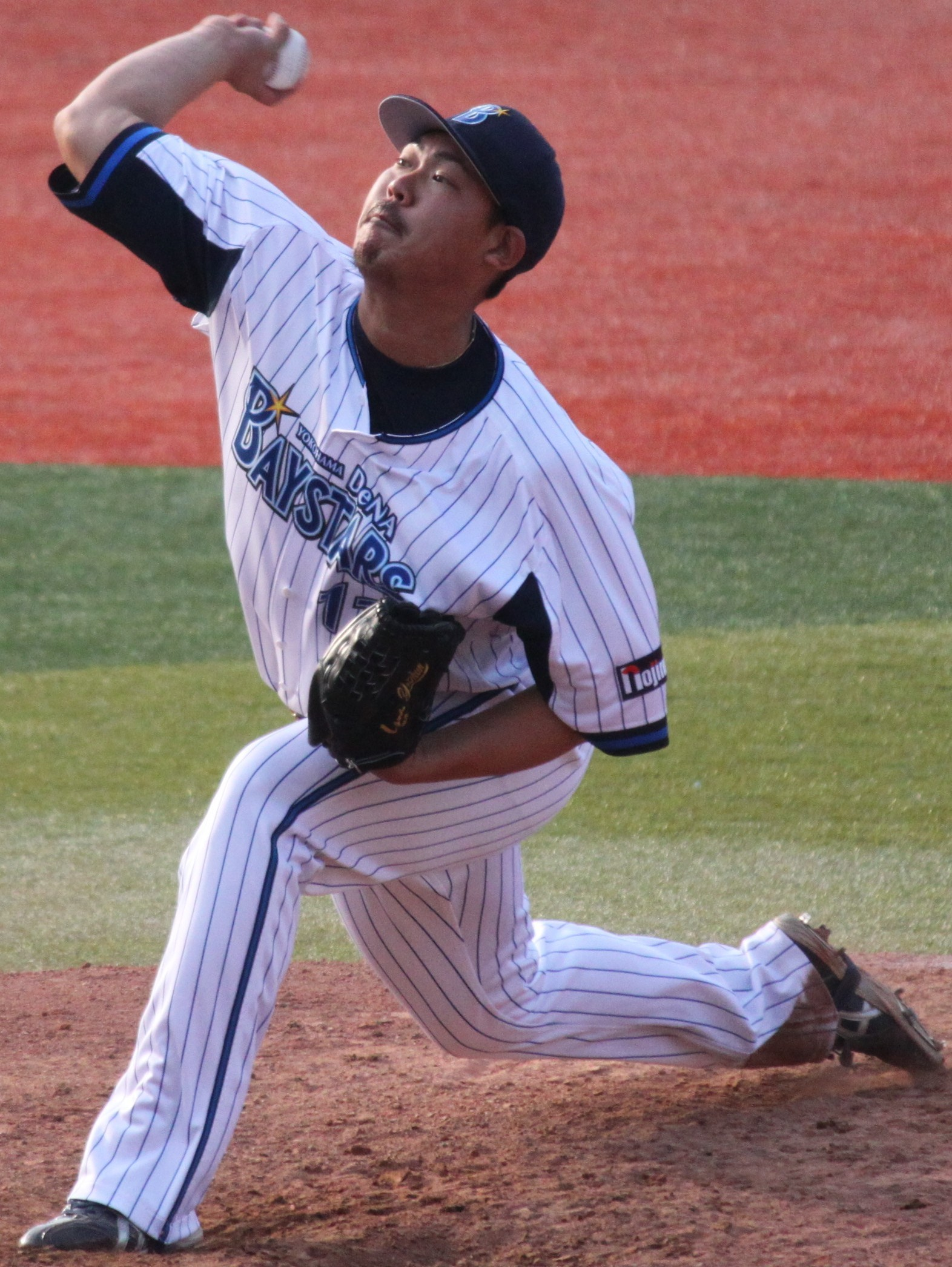
Yamaguchi pitching for the Yokohama DeNA BayStars

=== Yokohama DeNA BayStars ===
The Yokohama BayStars selected Yamaguchi in the first round in the 2005 Nippon Professional Baseball draft. He began his professional career with the Yokohama BayStars in 2006. In 2007, Yamaguchi recorded a 6.30 ERA in only 6 appearances for the main club. He improved in 2008, registering a stellar 0.76 ERA across 16 appearances. In 2009, he pitched in 51 games, recording a 5–4 record and 3.27 ERA. In 2010, Yamaguchi pitched to a 2.62 ERA with 78 strikeouts in 68.2 innings pitched, earning all-star honors for the first time. In 2011, he logged a 2.49 ERA with 48 strikeouts in 61.1 innings of work, and notched his second all-star selection. The next year, Yamaguchi pitched to a neat 1.74 ERA with 62 strikeouts in 60 games. He struggled in 2013, however, notching a 5.40 ERA across 44 appearances. He improved his performance the next year, recording a 8–5 record and 2.90 ERA in 33 games for Yokohama. In 2015, Yamaguchi pitched to a 3–6 record and 4.49 ERA in 20 appearances for the BayStars. In 2016, Yamaguchi earned all-star honors for the third time, notching an 11-5 record and 2.86 ERA on the year. He became a free agent after the season.

=== Yomiuri Giants ===
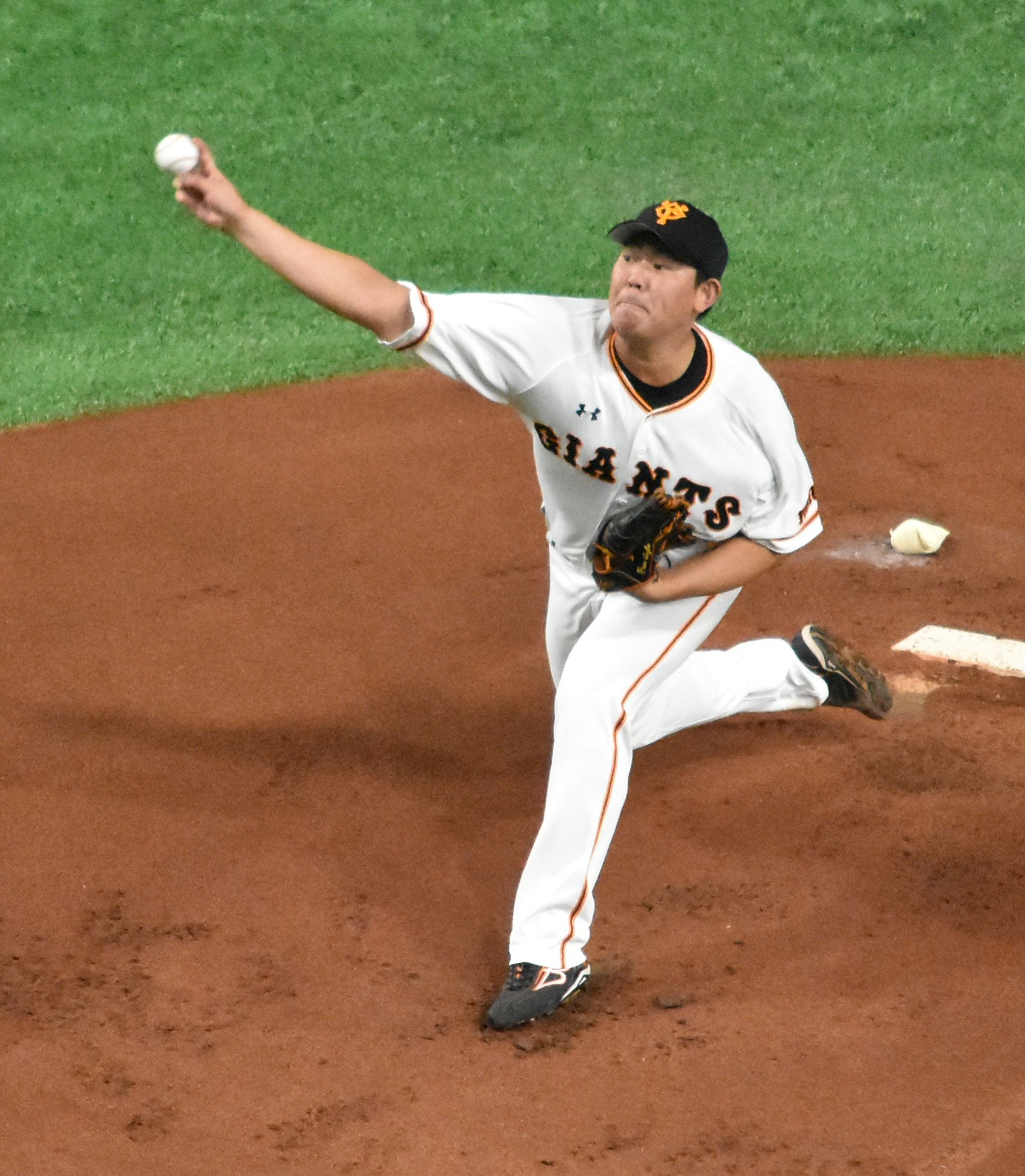
Yamaguchi pitching for the Yomiuri Giants

Yamaguchi signed with Yomiuri Giants in 2017 for the ensuing season. On the year, he logged a 6.43 ERA in only 4 games. On July 27, 2018, Yamaguchi threw a no-hitter against the Chunichi Dragons. On the season, he recorded a 3.68 ERA and 9-9 record in 30 games for Yomiuri. In 2019, he posted a 15–4 record (.789 winning percentage) that led Japan's Central League, along with a 2.91 ERA and 188 strikeouts over 170 innings. After the season, on October 1, 2019, he was selected for the Japan national baseball team at the 2019 WBSC Premier12. After the 2019 WBSC Premier12, on November 18, 2019, Giants held a press conference announcing the team has allowed Yamaguchi to enter the posting system to play in Major League Baseball (MLB). Paperwork for the posting was completed on December 3, 2019, and Yamaguchi became the first player in Giants history to be posted.

=== Toronto Blue Jays ===
On December 28, 2019, Yamaguchi signed a two-year, $6.35 million contract with the Toronto Blue Jays. On January 15, 2020, he held a press conference in Toronto. After the press conference, he stayed in Toronto, and attended a fan meeting. On March 26, he returned to Japan due to the COVID-19 pandemic. He returned to Toronto after the MLB announcement of the 2020 regular season. Yamaguchi was issued uniform # 1, being only the fifth Toronto pitcher (not initially listed as a position player) to ever pitch in a game wearing a single digit uniform number after Josh Towers, Kyle Drabek, Marcus Stroman, and Clayton Richard.

On July 27, 2020, Yamaguchi made his MLB debut. He became the first Japanese player who made his MLB debut as a Blue Jays member. On August 26, 2020, he earned his first MLB win. With the 2020 Toronto Blue Jays, Yamaguchi appeared in 17 games, compiling a 2–4 record with 8.06 ERA and 26 strikeouts in 25 2/3 innings pitched.

On February 11, 2021, Yamaguchi was designated for assignment. On February 13, Yamaguchi was released by the Blue Jays.

=== San Francisco Giants ===
On February 20, 2021, Yamaguchi agreed to a contract with the San Francisco Giants, reportedly a split major league/minor league deal. On June 2, Yamaguchi announced via Instagram that he would be leaving the Giants organization to return to Japan. He was officially released by San Francisco the next day. In five games for the Triple-A Sacramento River Cats, he had an 0–3 record and 6.17 ERA.

=== Yomiuri Giants (second stint) ===
On June 10, 2021, Yamaguchi agreed to a contract to return to the Yomiuri Giants of Nippon Professional Baseball. He made 15 appearances down the stretch for Yomiuri, posting a 2–8 record and 3.56 ERA. In 2022, Yamaguchi pitched in only one game for the Giants, recording two scoreless innings. He became a free agent following the 2022 season.

On April 17, 2023, Yamaguchi announced his retirement from professional baseball.

== Playing style ==
Yamaguchi is a 6 ft 2 in, 225 lb right-handed pitcher. He throws a fastball averaging 90 mph (tops out at 95 mph) as a starter. The forkball is his primary secondary pitch and he also has a slider.

== Personal life ==
His father is Hisashi Yamaguchi, a former champion sumo wrestler.

On December 25, 2014, Yamaguchi married Japanese gravure idol and actress Kaori Takagi (高木 加織, Takagi Kaori, born July 23, 1985). The marriage was only announced on March 14, 2015, by Takagi in her official blog and less than a week later, their daughter was born on March 20, 2015. Takagi gave birth to their second child, a son, on August 20, 2016.

Yamaguchi was suspended for the second half of the 2017 season, after being charged with causing bodily harm to a hospital security guard as well as heavy damage to hospital property, while intoxicated. He reportedly was at the hospital to receive treatment on his pitching hand.
