= Héctor Pérez (baseball) =

Dominican baseball player (born 1996)

Caliente de Durango
- Pitcher
- Born: June 6, 1996 (age 30); Santo Domingo, Dominican Republic
- Bats: Right Throws: Right

Professional debut
- MLB: September 16, 2020, for the Toronto Blue Jays
- CPBL: March 31, 2024, for the Uni-President Lions

MLB statistics (through 2023 season)
- Win–loss record: 0–0
- Earned run average: 13.50
- Strikeouts: 1

CPBL statistics (through 2024 season)
- Win–loss record: 3–2
- Earned run average: 1.50
- Strikeouts: 52
- Stats at Baseball Reference

Teams
- Toronto Blue Jays (2020); Tampa Bay Rays (2023); Uni-President Lions (2024)

Héctor Antonio Pérez (born June 6, 1996) is a Dominican professional baseball pitcher for the Caliente de Durango of the Mexican League. He has previously played in Major League Baseball (MLB) for the Toronto Blue Jays and Tampa Bay Rays.

== Career ==
=== Houston Astros ===
Pérez signed with the Houston Astros as an international free agent in 2014. In 2015, he was assigned to the Rookie-level Dominican Summer League Astros, and later promoted to the Gulf Coast League Astros and Rookie Advanced Greeneville Astros. In 17 pitching appearances, Pérez posted a 2–0 win–loss record, 1.64 earned run average (ERA), and 50 strikeouts in 55 innings pitched. He split time in 2016 with the Low-A Tri-City ValleyCats and the Single-A Quad Cities River Bandits, and worked to a 4–1 combined record, 3.15 ERA, and 80 strikeouts in 60 innings. Perez opened the 2017 season with the River Bandits, and was later promoted to the High-A Buies Creek Astros. In a career-high 107 1/3 innings, Pérez posted a 7–6 record, 3.44 ERA, and 128 strikeouts.

Pérez was assigned to Buies Creek to begin 2018, and earned a promotion to the Double-A Corpus Christi Hooks in early July.

=== Toronto Blue Jays ===
On July 30, 2018, the Astros traded Pérez, Ken Giles, and David Paulino to the Blue Jays for Roberto Osuna. The Blue Jays added Pérez to their 40-man roster after the season, in order to protect him from the Rule 5 draft. He spent the 2019 season with the Double-A New Hampshire Fisher Cats, recording a 7–6 record and 4.60 ERA in 26 games. He made his major league debut September 16, 2020. With the 2020 Toronto Blue Jays, Pérez appeared in 1 game, posting a 10.80 ERA with 1 strikeout in 1 2/3 innings pitched.

=== Cincinnati Reds ===
On January 22, 2021, Pérez was traded to the Cincinnati Reds in exchange for cash considerations or a player to be named later (Darlin Guzman was sent to Toronto as the PTBNL on July 8). After struggling to a 9.35 ERA across 7 appearances for the Triple-A Louisville Bats, Pérez was designated for assignment on June 2. At the time of his designation, Pérez had not appeared in a game with Cincinnati. He cleared waivers and was sent outright to Triple-A Louisville on June 7. Pérez elected free agency following the season on November 7.

=== Baltimore Orioles ===
On May 11, 2022, Pérez signed a minor league contract with the Baltimore Orioles organization. In 22 cumulative appearances between the rookie-level Florida Complex League Orioles, Single-A Delmarva Shorebirds, and Double-A Bowie Baysox, Pérez pitched to a combined 3.51 ERA with 48 strikeouts and 3 saves in 33 1/3 innings pitched.

=== Tampa Bay Rays ===
On December 7, 2022, Pérez was claimed by the Tampa Bay Rays in the minor league phase of the Rule 5 draft. He was assigned to the Triple-A Durham Bulls to begin the 2023 season.

On April 22, 2023, Pérez had his contract selected to the active roster. He did not make an appearance for the Rays before he was designated for assignment the following day after Zach Eflin was activated from the injured list. He cleared waivers and was sent outright to Durham on April 25. In 33 games for Durham, he posted a 4–0 record and 4.08 ERA with 69 strikeouts and 5 saves in 53.0 innings of work. On August 16, the Rays again selected Pérez's contract, adding him back to the major league roster. He appeared in that day's game against the San Francisco Giants, working 1/3 of an inning and allowing one run on three hits and a walk. The next day, Pérez was designated for assignment following Andrew Kittredge's activation from the injured list. Rather than accept an outright assignment to Durham, Pérez elected free agency on August 20.

=== Philadelphia Phillies ===
On August 26, 2023, Pérez signed a minor league contract with the Philadelphia Phillies organization. In 9 games for the Triple–A Lehigh Valley IronPigs, recording a 3.75 ERA with 13 strikeouts across 12 innings pitched. Pérez elected free agency following the season on November 6.

=== Uni-President Lions ===
On March 1, 2024, Pérez signed with the Uni-President Lions of the Chinese Professional Baseball League. In 36 appearances out of the bullpen, Pérez logged a 3–2 record and 1.50 ERA with 52 strikeouts and 8 saves across 54 innings of work.

=== Leones de Yucatán ===
On April 14, 2026, Pérez signed with the Leones de Yucatán of the Mexican League. In 10 relief appearances, he posted an 0–2 record with a 3.27 ERA, 13 strikeouts, and 10 walks across 11 innings of work.

=== Algodoneros de Unión Laguna ===
On May 16, 2026, Pérez was traded to the Algodoneros de Unión Laguna of the Mexican League. In 24 games (5 starts) with Laguna he threw 30.1 innings going 2-3 with a 5.93 ERA with 30 strikeouts.

=== Caliente de Durango ===
On November 9, 2026, Pérez alongside Kevin Lopez were traded to the Caliente de Durango in exchange for Devin Smeltzer.

== See also ==
- Rule 5 draft results
