= Rafael Dolis =

Dominican baseball player (born 1988)

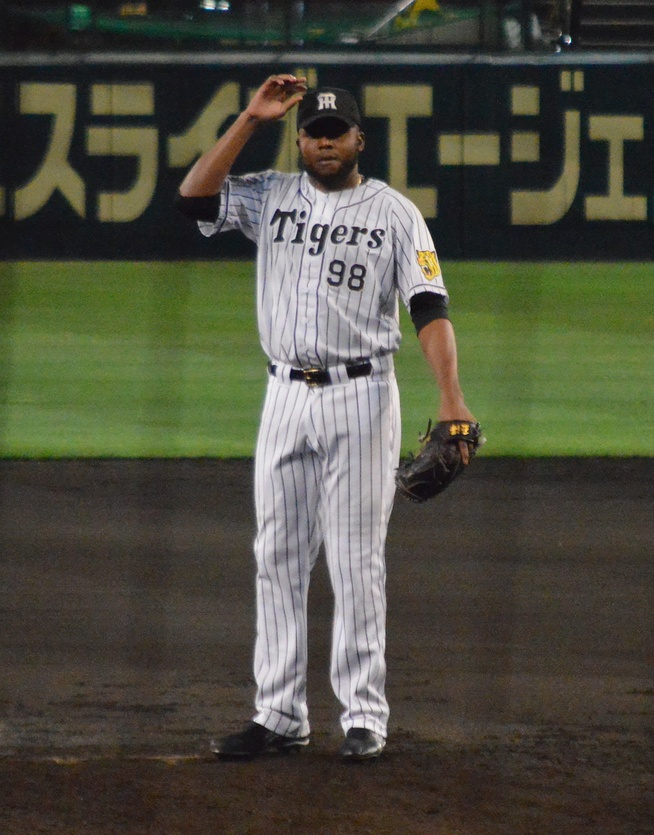
- Dolis with the Hanshin Tigers in 2016

Hanshin Tigers – No. 98
- Pitcher
- Born: January 10, 1988 (age 38); La Romana, Dominican Republic
- Bats: Right Throws: Right

Professional debut
- MLB: September 26, 2011, for the Chicago Cubs
- NPB: April 19, 2016, for the Hanshin Tigers

MLB statistics (through 2021 season)
- Win–loss record: 6–9
- Earned run average: 4.57
- Strikeouts: 95

NPB statistics (through August 19, 2026)
- Win–loss record: 17–23
- Earned run average: 2.36
- Strikeouts: 291
- Saves: 115
- Stats at Baseball Reference

Teams
- Chicago Cubs (2011–2013); Hanshin Tigers (2016–2019); Toronto Blue Jays (2020–2021); Hanshin Tigers (2025–present)

Career highlights and awards
- NPB: Saves leader (2017)

Rafael Jose Dolis Hernandez (born January 10, 1988) is a Dominican professional baseball pitcher for the Hanshin Tigers of the Nippon Professional Baseball (NPB). He has previously played in Major League Baseball (MLB) for the Chicago Cubs and Toronto Blue Jays.

== Professional career ==
=== Chicago Cubs ===
Dolis began his professional career in 2006 pitching for the rookie-level Arizona League Cubs, going 0–2 with an 8.28 ERA in 13 games (three starts). In 25 innings of work, he struck out 33 batters. He pitched for the Peoria Chiefs in 2007, going 3–1 with a 1.80 ERA in six starts. After not pitching in 2008, Dolis pitched for the Daytona Cubs in 2009, going 3–9 with a 3.79 ERA in 27 games (25 starts). On November 20, 2009, the Cubs added Dolis to their 40-man roster to protect him from the Rule 5 draft.

Dolis began the 2010 campaign with Daytona, recording a 2.92 ERA across 14 games (13 starts). He also made 12 starts for the Double–A Tennessee Smokies on the year, logging a 5–4 record and 4.07 ERA with 45 strikeouts across 55 1/3 innings pitched. Dolis returned to Tennessee in 2011, compiling an 8–5 record and 3.22 ERA with 48 strikeouts and 17 saves across 51 appearances.

Dolis made Chicago's Opening Day roster in 2012. However, he was demoted to the team's Triple-A affiliate, the Iowa Cubs, in May after compiling a record of 2–4 with an ERA of 4.73. On the season, Dolis registered a 6.39 ERA with 24 strikeouts and 4 saves across 38 innings of work.

In 2013, Dolis made five scoreless appearances for the Cubs, recording no strikeouts in five innings pitched. On October 9, 2013, Dolis was removed from the 40–man roster and sent outright to Triple–A Iowa.

=== San Francisco Giants ===
On December 30, 2013, Dolis signed a minor league deal with the San Francisco Giants. In four games for the Triple–A Sacramento River Cats, he struggled to a 16.62 ERA with 4 strikeouts across 4 1/3 innings pitched. On May 26, 2014, Dolis was released by the Giants.

=== Detroit Tigers ===
On December 5, 2014, Dolis signed a minor league contract with the Detroit Tigers. He elected free agency on November 6, 2015. During the 2015 season, Dolis pitched in 43 games out of the bullpen and posted a 7–5 record with one save, a 4.61 ERA and 54 strikeouts for the Triple-A Toledo Mud Hens.

On December 8, 2015, Dolis re-signed with the Tigers on a minor league contract with an invite to spring training. However, he was released on January 15, 2016, in order to pursue a playing opportunity in Japan.

=== Hanshin Tigers ===
On January 18, 2016, Dolis signed with the Hanshin Tigers of Nippon Professional Baseball (NPB).

In 2016, Dolis pitched 34 innings of 2.12 ERA ball for the Tigers. On December 2, 2016, he became a free agent.

On February 22, 2017, Dolis re-signed with the Tigers. In 2017, Dolis pitched 63 innings for the Tigers with a 2.71 ERA. After the season, on December 11, 2017, he re-signed with the Tigers with Marcos Mateo.

In 2018, Dolis pitched to a 2.85 ERA in 53 2/3 innings. On December 2, 2018, he became a free agent. On December 12, 2018, he re-signed with the Tigers.

In 2019, his last year with the Tigers, he had a 2.11 ERA in 55 1/3 innings of work. In his four years with the Tigers, Dolis had a 13–18 record, 2.49 ERA, 96 saves, and 227 strikeouts in 206 innings. On December 2, 2019, he became a free agent.

=== Toronto Blue Jays ===
On February 8, 2020, Dolis signed a one-year, $1 million contract with the Toronto Blue Jays. His contract includes a club option for the 2021 season.

On July 24, 2020, Dolis made his Blue Jays debut and on August 19, 2020, he recorded his first MLB save since 2012. With the 2020 Toronto Blue Jays, Dolis appeared in 24 games, compiling a 2–2 record with 1.50 ERA and 31 strikeouts in 24.0 innings pitched. In 32 appearances for the Blue Jays in 2021, Dolis posted a 2–3 record with a 5.63 ERA and 39 strikeouts. On August 18, 2021, Dolis was designated for assignment by the Blue Jays. On August 20, Dolis cleared waivers and was assigned outright to the Triple-A Buffalo Bisons. On October 4, Dolis elected free agency.

=== Chicago White Sox ===
On April 29, 2022, Dolis signed a minor league contract with the Chicago White Sox. He made 28 outings for the Triple–A Charlotte Knights, registering a 5.02 ERA with 28 strikeouts across 28 2/3 innings pitched. Dolis was released by the White Sox organization on September 8.

=== Pericos de Puebla ===
On January 13, 2023, Dolis signed with the Pericos de Puebla of the Mexican League. In 25 appearances, he posted a 1–3 record with a 6.56 ERA and 20 strikeouts in 23 1/3 innings. Dolis was waived on July 10.

=== Kōchi Fighting Dogs ===
On April 8, 2024, Dolis signed with the Kōchi Fighting Dogs of the Shikoku Island League Plus.

=== Hanshin Tigers (second stint) ===
On July 22, 2025, Dolis signed with the Hanshin Tigers of Nippon Professional Baseball, marking his second stint with the club. He became a free agent following the season.

On December 19, Dolis re-signed with the Tigers.
