= Gil Kim =

American baseball executive and coach (born 1981)

Dunedin Blue Jays
- Manager
- Born: December 20, 1981 (age 43); Philadelphia, Pennsylvania, US
- Bats: Both Throws: Right

Teams
- Toronto Blue Jays (2020–2024)

Gil Kim (born December 20, 1981) is an American baseball executive and coach who is the manager of the Dunedin Blue Jays of the Single-A Florida State League.

Kim played college baseball at Middlebury College and Vanderbilt University before embarking on a professional baseball career in the Netherlands, China, Australia, Spain, and Venezuela. In 2010, Kim became a scout for the Texas Rangers of MLB in Mexico, and later in the Dominican Republic. He was promoted to their director of international scouting in 2014, before being hired as the director of player development for the Blue Jays in 2016. He became a coach in 2020.

== Playing career ==
Kim attended Pottsville Area High School in Pottsville, Pennsylvania, and played for the school's baseball, soccer, and basketball teams. He played in an international tournament in Puerto Rico during his sophomore year. Kim transferred to Lawrenceville School after his sophomore year, which he repeated. He was named All-State in baseball for three years at Lawrenceville. Kim attended Middlebury College for one year, and played college baseball for the Middlebury Panthers, and then transferred to Vanderbilt University. He played for the Vanderbilt Commodores, receiving 21 at bats in three seasons, recording one single. He graduated from Vanderbilt with a Bachelor of Arts in history in 2006.

Kim began his professional baseball career for the Omron Pioneers in a Dutch baseball league. He then played for the Beijing Tigers of the China Baseball League and the Western Districts Bulldogs in the Greater Brisbane League in Australia. In 2008, he played for FC Barcelona's baseball team in Spain, and then joined his manager with the Tiburones de La Guaira of the Venezuelan Professional Baseball League.

== Executive and coaching career ==
Kim interned for the Pittsburgh Pirates of Major League Baseball in 2009 for three months before he was hired by the Texas Rangers as an area scout covering Mexico in 2010. He and Tony LaCava scouted Roberto Osuna. He also scouted for the Rangers in the Dominican Republic. In 2014, the Rangers promoted Kim to director of international scouting.

In January 2016, the Blue Jays hired Kim to be their first director of player development. In 2020, the Blue Jays promoted Kim to the major league coaching staff, while keeping his role as director of player development. In 2022, the Blue Jays named Kim the field coordinator.

On February 13, 2025, Kim was announced as the new manager of the Dunedin Blue Jays of the single-A Florida State League.

== Personal life ==
Kim's parents Yongcheol and Soonae were born in Korea; he was born in Philadelphia. Kim and his wife married in December 2015.
