= 2019 New York Yankees season =

Season for the Major League Baseball team the New York Yankees

2019 New York Yankees
- American League East champions
- League: American League
- Division: East
- Ballpark: Yankee Stadium
- City: New York
- Record: 103–59 (.636)
- Divisional place: 1st
- Owners: Yankee Global Enterprises
- General managers: Brian Cashman
- Managers: Aaron Boone
- Television: YES Network; WPIX-TV (Michael Kay, Ken Singleton, Ryan Ruocco, several others as analysts)
- Radio: WFAN SportsRadio 66 AM / 101.9 FM; New York Yankees Radio Network (John Sterling, Suzyn Waldman)

The 2019 New York Yankees season was the 117th season for the New York Yankees franchise in Major League Baseball. The Yankees played in Yankee Stadium in The Bronx, and were managed by Aaron Boone in his second season as manager.

The Yankees won the American League East for the first time since the 2012 season, clinching the division with a 9–1 win over the Angels at home on September 19. In the postseason, they swept the Minnesota Twins in the Division Series, but lost the American League Championship Series to the Houston Astros in six games.

This marked the first calendar decade since the 1910s in which the team failed to make a single World Series appearance. It also was the first calendar decade since the 1910s in which no New York City team won the World Series.

The Yankees set a new MLB record by homering in 139 of their regular season games, surpassing the previous record held jointly by the 2012 and 2018 Yankees. Through most of the season, the Yankees competed with the Astros and Dodgers for the best record in baseball, but they lost 4 of their final 5 regular season games, finishing 4 and 3 games behind both teams, respectively.

== Offseason ==
=== Transactions ===
==== 2018 ====
- October 31 – Brett Gardner re-signs with the Yankees after his club option in his previous contract was denied. His new contract is a one-year, $9.5 million deal.
- November 7 – CC Sabathia re-signs for his final season with the Yankees, inking a one-year, $8 million deal.
- November 19 – The Yankees trade minor league prospects Justus Sheffield, Erik Swanson and Dom Thompson-Williams to the Seattle Mariners for LHP James Paxton.
- December 17 – J. A. Happ signs a two-year, $34 million contract with the Yankees. This deal goes through the 2020 season and includes a vesting option for 2021.

==== 2019 ====
- January 3 – Troy Tulowitzki signs the league-minimum one-year, $555,000 contract with the Yankees. He will still receive $38 million over two years from the Toronto Blue Jays due to his conditional release on December 11, 2018.
- January 11 – Zack Britton signs a three-year, $39 million contract with the Yankees. The deal goes through 2021 and has a team option for 2022, which is worth $14 million. Britton can opt-out of the contract after 2020 if the Yankees choose not to exercise the 2022 option.
- January 14 – DJ LeMahieu signs a two-year, $24 million contract with the Yankees. He is expected to be used at shortstop and third base as well as second base, his natural position.
- January 21 – The Yankees trade RHP Sonny Gray and LHP Reiver Sanmartin to the Cincinnati Reds for minor league 2B Shed Long and a competitive balance pick in the 2019 MLB draft. Long was then traded to the Seattle Mariners for minor league OF Josh Stowers.
- January 24 – Adam Ottavino signs a three-year, $27 million contract with the Yankees. He is the first person in franchise history to wear the uniform number 0.
- February 15 – Luis Severino signs a four-year contract extension, avoiding salary arbitration. The deal includes a club option for the 2023 season. He is guaranteed $40 million and will make an additional $12.25 million if the option is exercised.
- February 25 – Aaron Hicks signs a seven-year, $70 million contract extension with a $12.5 million club option for 2026, a $1 million buyout and a $2 million signing bonus. This deal replaces the previous one-year, $6 million deal announced on January 11.

== Spring training ==
The Yankees began their spring training on February 13, when pitchers and catchers reported. Their first spring training game was against the Boston Red Sox on February 23, in which they lost 5–8. They ended spring training with an exhibition game against the Washington Nationals at Nationals Park on March 25 in which they lost 3–5. Overall, they went 17–10–4, good for first place in the Grapefruit League.

== Regular season ==
=== Key dates ===
- March 28: Opening Day vs. Baltimore Orioles
- June 29–30: 2019 MLB London Series vs. Boston Red Sox
- July 8–11: All-Star Break
  - July 9: All-Star Game at Progressive Field in Cleveland, Ohio
- September 22: Final regular season game at home vs. Toronto Blue Jays
- September 29: Final regular season game vs. Texas Rangers at Globe Life Park in Arlington

=== Opening Day ===
The Yankees began the regular season against the Baltimore Orioles at Yankee Stadium on March 28, in which the Yankees won 7–2. Masahiro Tanaka pitched 5 2/3 innings and allowed 6 hits and 2 runs while striking out 5 in his first opening day victory.

==== Opening Day lineup ====
Opening Day starters
Name	Position
Brett Gardner	Center field
Aaron Judge	Right field
Giancarlo Stanton	Left field
Luke Voit	Designated hitter
Miguel Andújar	Third base
Gary Sánchez	Catcher
Greg Bird	First base
Gleyber Torres	Second base
Troy Tulowitzki	Shortstop

==== Line score ====
Thursday, March 28, 2019 1:05 pm (EDT) at Yankee Stadium in Bronx, New York, 48 °F (9 °C), sunny
Team	1	2	3	4	5	6	7	8	9	R	H	E
Baltimore Orioles	0	0	0	1	0	1	0	0	0	2	8	0
New York Yankees	3	0	1	0	2	0	0	1	X	7	9	1
WP: Masahiro Tanaka (1–0) LP: Andrew Cashner (0–1); Home runs: BAL: None; NYY: Greg Bird (1), Luke Voit (1); Attendance: 46,928; Boxscore

=== March/April ===
March 28–31, vs. Baltimore Orioles

After winning the season opener 7–2, the Yankees went on to lose the next two games against division rivals Orioles. In the second game of the season, offseason signing James Paxton's debut on the mound ended with a 5–3 loss. Errors and a poor start by the Yankees offense cost them the game. The Yanks didn't bounce back the following day, in a game that was delayed more than three hours because of rain. J. A. Happ took his first loss at the Yankee Stadium since August 2013 as the offense failed to capitalize on numerous run opportunities. New York lost their second game in a row, 7–5, as well as the opening series against the O's. Over the two final games, the Yankees went 5 for 21 with runners in scoring position, stranding 25 men on base.

Yankees lost the series 1–2 (15–14 runs)

April 1–3, vs. Detroit Tigers

The Yankees started their second season series with a 3–1 win against Detroit. Shortly before the game started, the team added their star outfielder Giancarlo Stanton and third baseman Miguel Andújar to an already filled up injury list. Andújar was diagnosed with a torn labrum, which could need surgery in the following weeks. The remaining Yankees defeated the Tigers, majorly thanks to a stellar diving catch by Aaron Judge in the eighth inning, when they were in jeopardy of losing their shy lead. Tigers manager Ron Gardenhire said the play was the turning point of the game. The pinstripes fared less well in the remaining two games, losing them both by a narrow score. On April 2, with the game tied at 1 in the top of the ninth inning, Dustin Peterson's double gave the Tigers the lead against the Yankees closer Aroldis Chapman, in what was the first hit of his career. Detroit went on to win that one 3–1. In the final game of the series, the Yankees lost 2–1 to a dominating performance by left-handed pitcher Matthew Boyd, who struck out a career-high 13 batters in 6 1/3 innings.

Yankees lost the series 1–2 (5–6 runs)

April 4–7, at Baltimore Orioles

New York swept the Orioles at Camden Yards in their second meeting of the season, delivering a total of 14 home runs—seven of which in the last game alone. The Yankees had a rough start of the first game, but were rescued by Gleyber Torres to produce an 8–4 victory. Trailing by a score of 3–0, Torres homered a ball into the left field to get the Yankees in the scoreboard. Later on, trailing by 4–2 and with two men on base, Torres homered again to take the lead. In the second game of the series the Yankees won 6–4, as Aaron Judge homered twice and Clint Frazier hit a three-run homer to retake the lead. The Yanks claimed the series sweep in a 15–3 blowout, once again steampowered by home runs. Gary Sánchez homered thrice and had the opportunity for a fourth home run, a rare feat only accomplished by 18 players in MLB to date.

Yankees won the series 3–0 (29–11 runs)

April 8–10, at Houston Astros

The Yankees got swept by the Astros at Minute Maid Park for the first time in history. Despite getting on the scoreboard first in all three games of the series, New York suffered from mistakes in the field and subpar pitching. In the 8th inning of game 1, Carlos Correa hit off Adam Ottavino, who had not allowed a run yet in the season, to give Houston what would be the definitive lead, 4–3. The next day, the Yankees announced pitcher Luis Severino had strained a right latissimus dorsi muscle and would not return to the mound until about late June, another addition to the Yanks million-dollar worth injured list. A mistake by Brett Gardner in the third inning, who stopped running to first base assuming the ball had been foul, allowed a double play by the Astros. Moreover, Clint Frazier missed multiple diving catches, and relief pitcher Chad Green allowed a two-run double to George Springer in the eighth inning. The Yanks lost that one 6–3 after being ahead twice. Finally, the Yankees could not avoid the sweep in an 8–6 loss where a late rally by New York fell short. Having cut the deficit from 2–7 to 6–7 in the top of the eighth, a bad throw by Gleyber Torres fostered an Astros run to seal the game and the series.

Yankees lost the series 0–3 (12–18 runs)

April 12–14, vs. Chicago White Sox

Back at Yankee Stadium, New York lost yet another series, to the White Sox. Prior to the first game, Gary Sánchez became the 12th player on the Yankees injured list, the most of any team in the major leagues. Later, a rain-shortened 9–6 loss became the Yankees' fourth in a row, and J. A. Happ's second of the season, who allowed nine hits and six runs in just four innings pitched. Eloy Jiménez, one of the top prospects in baseball, threw his first two career home runs to give Chicago the game, declared official after the top seventh. New York bounced back in the second game of the series with a 4–0 win. CC Sabathia returned after recovery from heart surgery and debuted at the mound in his 19th and final season. He allowed a single hit in five innings and kept the White Sox off the scoreboard. However, Chicago claimed the series on the following day with a 5–2 win over the Yankees. Tim Anderson scored the first grand slam of his career when the White Sox were trailing by 2 to take the lead.

Yankees lost the series 1–2 (12–14 runs)

April 16–17, vs. Boston Red Sox

In their first meeting of the season, the Yankees swept their longtime rivals and reigning World Series champions in a two-game series. One day before the series started, the pinstripes added another player to the injured list, first baseman Greg Bird. The first game was an 8–0 shutout by the Yankees, with a dominating James Paxton who struck out 12 Red Sox batters and allowed only two hits over eight innings. Meanwhile, Boston ace pitcher Chris Sale allowed seven hits and four runs in five innings and collected his fourth loss of the season. The second game was closer, and an early 3–0 lead by the Red Sox menaced with evening the series. However, a Brett Gardner go-ahead grand slam in the bottom seventh, which was his 100th career home run, gave the Yanks the definitive lead, 5–3. Tommy Kahnle was credited with his first win of the season and Aroldis Chapman made his third save.

Yankees won the series 2–0 (13–3 runs)

April 18–21, vs. Kansas City Royals

The Yankees won the four-game series against Kansas City to reclaim an over .500 winning percentage, although star outfielder Aaron Judge was injured in the third game.

Yankees won the series 3–1 (23–16 runs)

April 22–25, at Los Angeles Angels

The Yankees started their road trip to the West Coast at Angel Stadium, where they won their third series in a row.

Yankees won the series 3–1 (22–24 runs)

April 26–28, at San Francisco Giants

New York got the sweep against San Francisco in a three-game series at Oracle Park.

Yankees won the series 3–0 (24–12 runs)

April 30 – May 1, at Arizona Diamondbacks

The Diamondbacks swept the Yankees in a two-game series at their home stadium. CC Sabathia became the 17th pitcher to collect 3,000 or more strikeouts in a career in the first game.

Yankees lost the series 0–2 (3–6 runs)

=== May ===
May 3–5, vs. Minnesota Twins

The Yankees won two out of three games in a series against the Minnesota Twins.

Yankees won the series 2–1 (13–10 runs)

May 6–9, vs. Seattle Mariners

New York got their seventh series win of the season, and second in a row, against the Mariners.

Yankees won the series 3–1 (16–18 runs)

May 10–12, at Tampa Bay Rays

The Yankees went to Tropicana Field with the opportunity to claim division leadership by sweeping the Rays, which were leading the AL East themselves. Although the Yanks did not get the sweep, they moved up to half a game behind Tampa Bay with the series win.

Yankees won the series 2–1 (13–11 runs)

May 13–15, vs. Baltimore Orioles

The games against the Orioles intended for May 13 and May 14 were both postponed, one of them to May 15 and the other to August 12, due to inclement weather. Therefore, the series itself consisted of a doubleheader on May 15, the first in the season for the Yankees, who claimed the sweep over the Orioles.

Yankees won the series 2–0 (8–4 runs)

May 17–19, vs. Tampa Bay Rays

With AL East up for grabs, the Rays went to the Bronx to play a three-game series against the Yankees. The pinstripes won the series 2–1 to claim a half-game lead over Tampa Bay.

Yankees won the series 2–1 (18–10 runs)

May 20–23, at Baltimore Orioles

The Yankees and the Orioles met at Camden Yards for their fourth series of the season, with New York sweeping Baltimore for the third time.

Yankees won the series 4–0 (34–21 runs)

May 24–26, at Kansas City Royals

The Yankees won a three-game series against the Royals at Kauffman Stadium. The first game had to be postponed due to inclement weather, resulting in a doubleheader on May 25.

Yankees won the series 2–1 (20–16 runs)

May 27–29, vs. San Diego Padres

The Yankees returned to New York and added two wins and a loss against the Padres. Chad Green opened the series by pitching a single inning, striking out three batters before yielding to David Hale. Hale pitched for four innings and allowed two runs, and was relieved by Adam Ottavino in the sixth, Tommy Kahnle in the seventh, Zack Britton in the eighth, and Aroldis Chapman had his 15th save of the season in the ninth. Home runs by Clint Frazier, Brett Gardner and Gary Sánchez steampowered a 5–2 Yankees win, improving to a 3–0 record with Green as a starter. In the second game, Eric Hosmer hit an early three-run homer against Masahiro Tanaka, who took his fourth loss of the season. After a solid performance by Eric Lauer, allowing four hits and one run over 5 1/3 innings, the Padres delved through their bullpen to hold off the Yankees, 5–4. On the following day, New York cruised to a 7–0 shutout to claim their eighth series in a row. For the 10th time in franchise history, the Yankees opened the game with back-to-back homers. James Paxton returned to the mound after his injury and pitched four hitless innings.

Yankees won the series 2–1 (16–7 runs)

May 30 – June 2, vs. Boston Red Sox

The Yankees faced their longtime rivals for the second time in the season. The first game of the series was postponed to August 3, resulting in a three-game series. In the series opener, the Red Sox got onto the scoreboard first, but DJ LeMahieu later delivered an RBI double and a home run off Chris Sale to secure a 4–1 Yankees win. New York dominated from the mound that day, with starter J. A. Happ limiting the Sox to a single homer over five innings and closer Aroldis Chapman striking out two of three men to earn his 16th save of the season. On the next day, with the score tied at 3 in the bottom fifth, Gary Sánchez hit a two-run homer to get the lead, which was locked down by six Yankees relief pitchers throwing a combined 5 1/3 scoreless innings. With the 5–3 victory over the Red Sox, the pinstripes went 4–0 against their rivals for the first time since 2012 and claimed their ninth series in a row for the first time since 1998. The Yankees could not complete the sweep in the last game, mostly because of a couple mistakes by Clint Frazier and strong pitching by David Price. A late rally by New York fell short and they experienced their first defeat of the season against the Sox, 8–5.

Yankees won the series 2–1 (14–12 runs)

=== June ===
June 4–6, at Toronto Blue Jays

The Yankees faced the Blue Jays at Rogers Centre, and lost their first series since early May.

Yankees lost the series 1–2 (16–17 runs)

June 7–9, at Cleveland Indians

The Yankees could not hold on in a three-game series against the Indians at Cleveland.

Yankees lost the series 1–2 (13–19 runs)

June 10–11, vs. New York Mets

The Yankees and the Mets split the first Subway Series of the season, which consisted of a doubleheader on June 11 because of the first game being postponed.

Yankes tied the series 1–1 (16–15 runs)

June 13–16, at Chicago White Sox

The pinstripes took on the four-game series against the White Sox at Guaranteed Rate Field, coming back from an 0–2 deficit to split the series.

Yankees tied the series 2–2 (24–22 runs)

June 17–19, vs. Tampa Bay Rays

The Yankees went back to winning ways by sweeping the Rays, cementing a 3 1/2-game lead at the top of AL East. In the series opener, a dominant Masahiro Tanaka pitched his seventh complete game in the Major League, allowing only two hits and striking 10 batters in a 3–0 shutout. Recently acquired DH Edwin Encarnación made his debut for the Yankees in the first game of the series, in which he went 0 for 4. On the next day, the Yankees won 6–3 in Giancarlo Stanton's return to the lineup, after more than two months on the IL. Cameron Maybin homered for his fourth consecutive game and Encarnación joined him with his first home run for the Bombers, as J. A. Happ improved to a 6–0 record in his last eight starts (7–3 overall). The Yankees completed the sweep on the day CC Sabathia collected his 250th win in the major league, becoming the 14th pitcher in major league history to both record 3,000 strikeouts and 250 wins. New York's offense contributed with two six-run explosive first and seventh innings, which added up to a 12–1 blowout, capped by Gleyber Torres' first career grand slam.

Yankees won the series 3–0 (21–4 runs)

June 20–23, vs. Houston Astros

The New York Yankees faced the Astros in a four-game series at home, winning three of them while breaking multiple team records.

Yankees won the series 3–1 (25–21 runs)

June 24–26, vs. Toronto Blue Jays

The Yankees swept the Blue Jays in a three-game series at the Bronx. On June 24, during the first game of the series, the Yankees tied an MLB record with the 2002 Texas Rangers for the most consecutive games with at least one home run, at 27. On June 25, the Yankees became the first team in MLB history to hit a home run in 28 straight games.

Yankees won the series 3–0 (22–18 runs)

=== 2019 MLB London Series ===
On June 29–30, the New York Yankees and the Boston Red Sox played a two-game series at London Stadium, in London. In the first MLB games ever played in Europe, the Yankees swept their longtime divisional rivals, 17–13 and 12–8, while posting some significant records. The Red Sox were the designated home team for both games, although the Yankees also wore their home jerseys in order to appear in their well-known pinstripes, despite being the visiting team. Both teams were allowed to have 26 active players on their rosters during the series (one more than MLB normally allows), with the extra man being a position player, as well as 28 players travel to London, in case a roster move (such as due to injury) was required between games.

Yankees won the series 2–0 (29–21 runs)

=== July ===
July 2–3, at New York Mets

Back across the Atlantic Ocean, the Yankees faced the Mets at Citi Field for the second Subway Series of the season—like the first one, the series was a split. In the first game, the Yankees streak of consecutive games with a home run came to an end at 31.

Yankees tied the series 1–1 (7–5 runs)

July 4–7, at Tampa Bay Rays

Right before the All-Star break, the pinstripes played a four-game series at Tropicana Field against Tampa Bay. Despite the Yanks taking a 2–0 lead with two similar 8–4 wins which went into extra innings, the Rays recovered to split the series.

Yankees tied the series 2–2 (20–14 runs)

All-Star break

The 90th Major League Baseball All-Star Game, which ended in a 4–3 win for the American League, had a big presence of pinstripes. Second baseman DJ LeMahieu and catcher Gary Sánchez were both on the AL starting lineup, Masahiro Tanaka was the winning pitcher, and Aroldis Chapman made the save. CC Sabathia threw the ceremonial first pitch.

July 12–14, vs. Toronto Blue Jays

The Yankees began the second half of the season with a ten-game homestand. In a three-game series against the Blue Jays, two out of three low scoring affairs went New York's way.

Yankees won the series 2–1 (9–4 runs)

July 15–18, vs. Tampa Bay Rays

The Yankees and the Rays met at Yankee Stadium for the last time in the 2019 season, leaving just two games to play at Tampa Bay later in the season. The Yanks claimed the series and finished 8 games ahead of the Rays. The Yankees started the series with a 5–4 loss, as Aroldis Chapman blew the save and allowed a three-run homer with two outs in the top of the ninth. Travis d'Arnaud hit three home runs, including the go ahead one, and became the first catcher to do so against the Yankees. The pinstripes bounced back the next day with an 8–3 win. In the bottom eighth, with the Yankees trailing 3–2, an Aaron Judge two-run homer sparked a rally to even the series, capped by Didi Gregorius' fourth career grand slam. Winning pitcher David Hale kept the game close in the seventh, inducing d'Arnaud into an inning-ending double play with bases loaded. The third game, intended for July 17, was postponed because of inclement weather, so the series ended on a doubleheader on July 18. The first game started badly for the Yanks, with Domingo Germán allowing two home runs to start the contest. However, Gio Urshela soon tied the game with a two-run homer of his own, and later added an RBI double in the three-run fifth. In the second inning, manager Aaron Boone was ejected for rebuking young umpire Brennan Miller, screaming, "My guys are fucking savages in that fucking box ... Tighten this shit up!" The Yankees emerged victorious, 6–2. The Yankees took the series in the second header, with a 5–1 win in which Chad Green, Nestor Cortes and Luis Cessa combined to limit the Rays to one run and five hits over 7 2/3 frames.

Yankees won the series 3–1 (23–11 runs)

July 19–21, vs. Colorado Rockies

The Yankees welcomed the Rockies to New York for an interleague series at Yankee Stadium. NY won the first game 8–2 and the second 11–5. In the last game, the Yankees went for the sweep but came up short in an 8–4 loss.

Yankees won the series 2–1 (23–15 runs)

July 22–24, at Minnesota Twins

The Yanks won two out of three games in a series against the Twins at Target Field to claim the fourth series in a row since the All-Star break.

Yankees won the series 2–1 (30–27 runs)

July 25–28, at Boston Red Sox

In their first trip of the season to Fenway Park, the Yankees were heavily defeated by their longtime rivals in three contests in a row, losing the first one 19–3, bouncing back in the last one to avoid the sweep. In all three losses, the Yankees allowed at least nine runs and never got more than five themselves. Nonetheless, the Yankees stayed atop of AL East, nine games clear of the Red Sox, as the series ended.

Yankees lost the series 1–3 (22–44 runs)

July 30–31, vs. Arizona Diamondbacks

The Yankees split a two-game series against the Diamondbacks at Yankee Stadium, with the D-backs winning the first and the Yankees winning the second and final game, 7–5.

Yankees tied the series 1–1 (9–9 runs)

=== August ===
August 2–4, vs. Boston Red Sox

A week after the Yankees' trip to Boston, it was Red Sox's turn to visit The Bronx. The Yankees completed a four-game sweep of the Red Sox for the first time since August 2009, reaching a season high 33 games over .500 while putting their division rivals in jeopardy of missing the postseason.

Yankees won the series 4–0 (26–12 runs)

August 5–7, at Baltimore Orioles

The Yankees completed another sweep against the Orioles at Camden Yards. Three slugfests by the Bombers made them break several home run records in the process. The Yanks started the series by winning their sixth game in a row, 9–6, while setting an MLB record for the most home runs delivered in an away ballpark in a season, at 32. The O's had managed to tie the game in the sixth inning, but Mike Ford hit his first career go-ahead homer in the top eighth to regain the lead, soon after which came Mike Tauchman's second home run of the night. Aroldis Chapman then closed the game with the tying run at the plate. The game was also remarkable because, despite the loss, Baltimore shortstop Jonathan Villar hit for the cycle.

Yankees won the series 3–0 (32–12 runs)

August 8–11, at Toronto Blue Jays

The Yanks and the Jays split a four-game series at Rogers Centre.

Yankees tied the series 2–2 (19–19 runs)

August 12–14, vs. Baltimore Orioles

In their sixth and final encounter of the season, the Yankees swept the Orioles for a fifth time, posting a 17–2 record against their division rivals. The series included a doubleheader on August 12 as a makeup for the game scheduled on May 14, postponed due to inclement weather, resulting in a four-game series. Torres scored a total 13 home runs versus the Orioles, setting a record in the divisional era.

Yankees won the series 4–0 (33–21 runs)

August 15–18, vs. Cleveland Indians

The Yankees and the Indians won two games apiece in a four-game series at Yankee Stadium.

Yankees tied the series 2–2 (18–34 runs)

August 20–22, at Oakland Athletics

The Yankees started a West Coast road trip in bad shape, getting swept by the A's in a three-game series at RingCentral Coliseum.

Yankees lost the series 0–3 (9–17 runs)

August 23–25, at Los Angeles Dodgers

The Yankees and the Dodgers faced each other at Dodger Stadium, in what the media, the fans and many players saw as a possible 2019 World Series matchup preview. The Yankees claimed the series 2–1, something that would give them home-field advantage in the Fall Classic in case both teams finish with the same winning percentage in the regular season. In the third game of the series, a 5–1 win by the New York team, the Yankees homered three times off Clayton Kershaw to set the record for most home runs in a calendar month at 61, surpassing the previous record of 58 owned by the 1987 Baltimore Orioles and the 1999 Seattle Mariners.

Yankees won the series 2–1 (16–5 runs)

August 26–28, at Seattle Mariners

The Yankees swept the Mariners at T-Mobile Park, finishing their road trip with a 5–4 record. The Bombers added more home runs to their record calendar month, going deep a total of 70 times during August still with two games to spare. One of these homers was the 100th of Aaron Judge's career, who became the third fastest player in baseball history to reach the centennial mark, during the 7–0 shutout by Masahiro Tanaka in the second game of the series.

Yankees won the series 3–0 (19–7 runs)

August 30 – September 1, vs. Oakland Athletics

The Yankees hosted the Athletics in a three-game series. After losing the first game, the Yankees bounced back to take the series, thus becoming the first team in the MLB to reach 90 wins. New York needed the extra innings to beat the A's for the first time in the season, 4–3, thanks to a DJ LeMahieu walk-off home run in the 11th. With the win, the Yankees completed their most winning calendar month since August 2009, while further improving their record of homers in a calendar month to 74. On the next day, with the series at stake, the Yankees stole the game with a walk-off once again. Trailing 4–0 and with six outs left, the Yankees cut their deficit to 4–3 in the bottom eighth, and then Brett Gardner and pinch-hitter Mike Ford back-to-back homered off Liam Hendriks in the ninth to tie the score and win the game, respectively.

Yankees won the series 2–1 (11–15 runs)

=== September ===
September 2–4, vs. Texas Rangers

The Yankees faced the Texas Rangers at home, the only American League team they hadn't met yet in the season. In the first game, New York was shut out, 7–0, and their streak of 220 consecutive games getting on the scoreboard came to an end. Steampowered by home runs, the Bombers bounced back to take the next two, claiming the series to remain unbeaten in their last 21 home series (an 18–0–3 record).

Yankees won the series 2–1 (14–9 runs)

September 6–9, at Boston Red Sox

The New York Yankees started their last trip of the season to Fenway Park with a loss, but bounced back to take the next three. The last one, a 5–0 shutout, eliminated the Red Sox from division contention and left them virtually out of the wild card race, at eight games back with less than 20 games to spare. The Yankees finished the season 14–5 against the Red Sox.

Yankees won the series 3–1 (21–12 runs)

September 10–12, at Detroit Tigers

The Yanks continued cruising into their first AL East pennant since 2012 with another series win, against the Tigers, reducing their magic number to five. In the last game, the second of a doubleheader on September 12, New York previewed what could be one of their postseason strategies: starting CC Sabathia, who struck out five in 3 1/3 innings to surpass John Smoltz on the all-time strikeouts list, and then relieving him with Domingo Germán, who did not allow a run over four frames, in a 6–4 victory. The doubleheader turned out to be costly for the Yankees, as they lost Edwin Encarnación due to a left oblique strain, J. A. Happ due to a left biceps tendinitis, and Gary Sánchez due to a left groin tightness.

Yankees won the series 2–1 (27–20 runs)

September 13–15, at Toronto Blue Jays

At Rogers Centre, the Yankees struggled to win against the Blue Jays, dropping two out of three contests. Nonetheless, the Yanks moved one step closer to clinching the AL East.

Yankees lost the series 1–2 (22–15 runs)

September 17–19, vs. Los Angeles Angels

The Yankees returned home to face the Angels in a three-game set, successfully clinching their first AL East title since 2012 with their 100th win of the year. Giancarlo Stanton also returned from injury in the second game of the series.

Yankees won the series 2–1 (19–4 runs)

September 20–22, vs. Toronto Blue Jays

In their final series with the Blue Jays of the year, the Yankees would lose the first game of a three-game series, but go on to win the next two.

Yankees won the series 2–1 (18–9 runs)

September 24–25, at Tampa Bay Rays

The Yankees would face the Rays one last time in Tampa, barring a postseason meeting. The Yankees failed to beat the Rays, losing both games of the two-game series.

Yankees lost the series 0–2 (6–1 runs)

September 27–29, at Texas Rangers

In the final series ever played at Globe Life Park in Arlington, Texas, the Yankees struggled to beat the Rangers. They won the first game of the series, scoring 14 runs, but dropped the next two, only scoring 5 runs. The Yankees ended their season with a 103–59 record, their best record since their 2009 championship season.

Yankees lost the series 1–2 (22–19 runs)

=== Transactions ===
- April 19 – The Yankees sign 1B/DH Logan Morrison to a minor league contract. The deal comes with a July 1 opt-out and a $1 multi-million base salary at the MLB level.
- April 22 – The Yankees grant Gio González his release. He went 2–1 with a 6.00 ERA in three starts at Scranton/Wilkes-Barre this year.
- April 25 – The Yankees acquire OF Cameron Maybin from the Cleveland Indians in exchange for cash considerations.
- May 14 – The Yankees acquire 1B/DH Kendrys Morales and cash from the Oakland Athletics in exchange for a PTBNL or cash considerations.
- June 15 – The Yankees acquire 1B/DH Edwin Encarnacion from the Seattle Mariners for cash considerations and minor league pitcher Juan Then.
- July 31 – The Yankees acquire OF Terrance Gore from the Kansas City Royals for cash considerations. The Yankees also acquire at the trade deadline minor league LHP Alfredo Garcia from the Colorado Rockies in exchange for RHP Joseph Harvey.
- August 24 – The Yankees acquire right-handed pitcher Cory Gearrin who they claimed off waivers from the Seattle Mariners.

== Season standings ==
=== American League East ===
AL East
Team	W	L	Pct.	GB	Home	Road
New York Yankees	103	59	.636	—	57‍–‍24	46‍–‍35
Tampa Bay Rays	96	66	.593	7	48‍–‍33	48‍–‍33
Boston Red Sox	84	78	.519	19	38‍–‍43	46‍–‍35
Toronto Blue Jays	67	95	.414	36	35‍–‍46	32‍–‍49
Baltimore Orioles	54	108	.333	49	25‍–‍56	29‍–‍52

=== American League Wild Card ===
Division leaders
Team	W	L	Pct.
Houston Astros	107	55	.660
New York Yankees	103	59	.636
Minnesota Twins	101	61	.623

Wild Card teams (Top 2 teams qualify for postseason)
Team	W	L	Pct.	GB
Oakland Athletics	97	65	.599	+1
Tampa Bay Rays	96	66	.593	—
Cleveland Indians	93	69	.574	3
Boston Red Sox	84	78	.519	12
Texas Rangers	78	84	.481	18
Chicago White Sox	72	89	.447	23½
Los Angeles Angels	72	90	.444	24
Seattle Mariners	68	94	.420	28
Toronto Blue Jays	67	95	.414	29
Kansas City Royals	59	103	.364	37
Baltimore Orioles	54	108	.333	42
Detroit Tigers	47	114	.292	48½

=== Record against opponents ===
2019 American League record Source: MLB Standings Grid – 2019
Team	BAL	BOS	CWS	CLE	DET	HOU	KC	LAA	MIN	NYY	OAK	SEA	TB	TEX	TOR	NL
Baltimore	—	7–12	3–3	3–4	3–4	2–4	3–3	4–3	0–6	2–17	1–6	3–4	7–12	1–6	8–11	7–13
Boston	12–7	—	5–2	3–3	5–2	2–4	5–1	4–3	3–3	5–14	4–3	4–3	7–12	4–3	11–8	10–10
Chicago	3–3	2–5	—	11–8	12–6	4–3	9–10	2–5	6–13	4–3	1–5	2–4	2–4	4–3	4–3	6–14
Cleveland	4–3	3–3	8–11	—	18–1	3–4	12–7	6–0	10–9	4–3	1–5	5–1	1–6	4–3	6–1	8–12
Detroit	4–3	2–5	6–12	1–18	—	1–6	10–9	3–3	5–14	3–3	1–6	1–6	2–4	0–6	3–4	5–15
Houston	4–2	4–2	3–4	4–3	6–1	—	5–1	14–5	3–4	4–3	11–8	18–1	3–4	13–6	4–2	11–9
Kansas City	3–3	1–5	10–9	7–12	9–10	1–5	—	2–4	5–14	2–5	2–5	2–5	3–4	2–5	1–6	9–11
Los Angeles	3–4	3–4	5–2	0–6	3–3	5–14	4–2	—	1–5	2–5	6–13	10–9	3–4	9–10	6–1	12–8
Minnesota	6–0	3–3	13–6	9–10	14–5	4–3	14–5	5–1	—	2–4	3–4	5–2	5–2	6–1	4–3	8–12
New York	17–2	14–5	3–4	3–4	3–3	3–4	5–2	5–2	4–2	—	2–4	6–1	12–7	3–3	11–8	12–8
Oakland	6–1	3–4	5–1	5–1	6–1	8–11	5–2	13–6	4–3	4–2	—	10–9	4–3	13–6	0–6	11–9
Seattle	4–3	3–4	4–2	1–5	6–1	1–18	5–2	9–10	2–5	1–6	9–10	—	2–4	8–11	4–2	9–11
Tampa Bay	12–7	12–7	4–2	6–1	4–2	4–3	4–3	4–3	2–5	7–12	3–4	4–2	—	3–3	13–6	14–6
Texas	6–1	3–4	3–4	3–4	6–0	6–13	5–2	10–9	1–6	3–3	6–13	11–8	3–3	—	3–3	9–11
Toronto	11–8	8–11	3–4	1–6	4–3	2–4	6–1	1–6	3–4	8–11	6–0	2–4	6–13	3–3	—	3–17

== Roster ==
2019 New York Yankees
Roster
Pitchers: 35,72 Chance Adams; 36,61 Jake Barrett; 68 Dellin Betances; 53 Zack Britton; 85 Luis Cessa; 54 Aroldis Chapman; 67 Nestor Cortes Jr.; 73 Ryan Dull; 35 Cory Gearrin; 55 Domingo Germán; 57 Chad Green; 75 David Hale; 34 J. A. Happ; 74 Joe Harvey; 61 Ben Heller; 56 Jonathan Holder; 48 Tommy Kahnle; 73 Mike King; 72 Brady Lail; 38,43 Jonathan Loáisiga; 70 Tyler Lyons; 74 Joe Mantiply; 47 Jordan Montgomery; 0 Adam Ottavino; 65 James Paxton; 73 Adonis Rosa; 52 CC Sabathia; 40 Luis Severino; 19 Masahiro Tanaka; 71 Stephen Tarpley	Catchers: 66 Kyle Higashioka; 28 Austin Romine; 24 Gary Sánchez; Infielders: 41 Miguel Andújar; 33 Greg Bird; 30 Edwin Encarnación; 30,90 Thairo Estrada; 36,74 Mike Ford; 18 Didi Gregorius; 26 DJ LeMahieu; 36 Kendrys Morales; 25 Gleyber Torres; 12 Troy Tulowitzki; 29 Gio Urshela; 36,70,74 Breyvic Valera; 45 Luke Voit; 14 Tyler Wade	Outfielders: 77 Clint Frazier; 11 Brett Gardner; 31 Aaron Hicks; 99 Aaron Judge; 38 Cameron Maybin; 27 Giancarlo Stanton; 39 Mike Tauchman	Manager: 17 Aaron Boone; Coaches: 59 Josh Bard (bench); -- Jason Brown (catching); -- Radley Haddad (bullpen catcher); 60 Mike Harkey (bullpen); 64 Carlos Mendoza (quality control/infield); 88 Phil Nevin (third base); 63 P. J. Pilittere (asst. hitting); 58 Larry Rothschild (pitching); 62 Marcus Thames (hitting); -- Brett Weber (assistant coach/instant replay); 50 Reggie Willits (first base/outfield)

== Game log ==
Legend
	Yankees win
	Yankees loss
	Postponement
**Bold**	Yankees team member

=== Regular season ===
2019 game log: 103–59 (Home: 57–24; Away: 46–35)
March: 1–2 (Home: 1–2; Away: 0–0)

#	Date	Opponent	Score	Win	Loss	Save	Stadium	Attendance	Record
1	March 28	Orioles	7–2	**Tanaka** (1–0)	Cashner (0–1)	—	**Yankee Stadium**	46,928	1–0
2	March 30	Orioles	3–5	Yacabonis (1–0)	**Paxton** (0–1)	Wright (1)	**Yankee Stadium**	42,203	1–1
3	March 31	Orioles	5–7	Means (1–0)	**Happ** (0–1)	Fry (1)	**Yankee Stadium**	38,419	1–2

April: 16–10 (Home: 7–5; Away: 9–5)

#	Date	Opponent	Score	Win	Loss	Save	Stadium	Attendance	Record
4	April 1	Tigers	3–1	**Germán** (1–0)	Ross (0–1)	**Chapman** (1)	**Yankee Stadium**	32,036	2–2
5	April 2	Tigers	1–3	Jiménez (1–0)	**Chapman** (0–1)	Greene (3)	**Yankee Stadium**	32,018	2–3
6	April 3	Tigers	1–2	Farmer (1–0)	**Green** (0–1)	Greene (4)	**Yankee Stadium**	33,038	2–4
7	April 4	@ Orioles	8–4	**Paxton** (1–1)	Wright (0–1)	—	Oriole Park at Camden Yards	44,182	3–4
8	April 6	@ Orioles	6–4	**Ottavino** (1–0)	Castro (0–1)	**Chapman** (2)	Oriole Park at Camden Yards	27,504	4–4
9	April 7	@ Orioles	15–3	**Germán** (2–0)	Hess (1–1)	—	Oriole Park at Camden Yards	33,102	5–4
10	April 8	@ Astros	3–4	Pressly (1–0)	**Ottavino** (1–1)	Osuna (3)	Minute Maid Park	27,631	5–5
11	April 9	@ Astros	3–6	Rondón (1–0)	**Green** (0–2)	Osuna (4)	Minute Maid Park	31,009	5–6
12	April 10	@ Astros	6–8	McHugh (2–1)	**Paxton** (1–2)	Pressly (1)	Minute Maid Park	27,685	5–7
13	April 12	White Sox	6–9 (7)	Giolito (2–1)	**Happ** (0–2)	Jones (1)	**Yankee Stadium**	40,913	5–8
14	April 13	White Sox	4–0	**Germán** (3–0)	Nova (0–2)	—	**Yankee Stadium**	41,176	6–8
15	April 14	White Sox	2–5	Rodón (2–2)	**Tanaka** (1–1)	Colomé (3)	**Yankee Stadium**	40,104	6–9
16	April 16	Red Sox	8–0	**Paxton** (2–2)	Sale (0–4)	—	**Yankee Stadium**	45,008	7–9
17	April 17	Red Sox	5–3	**Kahnle** (1–0)	Workman (0–1)	**Chapman** (3)	**Yankee Stadium**	44,106	8–9
18	April 18	Royals	1–6	Bailey (2–1)	**Germán** (3–1)	—	**Yankee Stadium**	39,106	8–10
19	April 19	Royals	6–2	**Sabathia** (1–0)	Junis (1–2)	—	**Yankee Stadium**	39,668	9–10
20	April 20	Royals	9–2	**Tanaka** (2–1)	Fillmyer (0–1)	—	**Yankee Stadium**	42,013	10–10
21	April 21	Royals	7–6 (10)	**Britton** (1–0)	Diekman (0–1)	—	**Yankee Stadium**	40,523	11–10
22	April 22	@ Angels	4–3 (14)	**Holder** (1–0)	Bard (0–1)	—	Angel Stadium	35,403	12–10
23	April 23	@ Angels	7–5	**Germán** (4–1)	Stratton (0–2)	**Britton** (1)	Angel Stadium	38,016	13–10
24	April 24	@ Angels	6–5	**Loáisiga** (1–0)	Buttrey (1–1)	**Chapman** (4)	Angel Stadium	37,928	14–10
25	April 25	@ Angels	5–11	Ramirez (1–0)	**Tanaka** (2–2)	—	Angel Stadium	39,584	14–11
26	April 26	@ Giants	7–3	**Paxton** (3–2)	Bumgarner (1–4)	—	Oracle Park	34,950	15–11
27	April 27	@ Giants	6–4	**Happ** (1–2)	Holland (1–4)	**Chapman** (5)	Oracle Park	33,971	16–11
28	April 28	@ Giants	11–5	**Germán** (5–1)	Rodríguez (3–3)	—	Oracle Park	34,540	17–11
29	April 30	@ Diamondbacks	1–3	Greinke (5–1)	**Sabathia** (1–1)	Holland (6)	Chase Field	36,352	17–12

May: 20–7 (Home: 12–4; Away: 8–3)

#	Date	Opponent	Score	Win	Loss	Save	Stadium	Attendance	Record
30	May 1	@ Diamondbacks	2–3	Kelly (3–2)	**Tanaka** (2–3)	Holland (7)	Chase Field	31,365	17–13
31	May 3	Twins	6–3	**Holder** (2–0)	Gibson (2–1)	**Chapman** (6)	**Yankee Stadium**	35,911	18–13
32	May 4	Twins	3–7	Odorizzi (4–2)	**Happ** (1–3)	—	**Yankee Stadium**	43,123	18–14
33	May 5	Twins	4–1 (8)	**Germán** (6–1)	Pineda (2–3)	**Chapman** (7)	**Yankee Stadium**	38,603	19–14
34	May 6	Mariners	7–3	**Sabathia** (2–1)	Hernández (1–3)	—	**Yankee Stadium**	37,423	20–14
35	May 7	Mariners	5–4	**Harvey** (1–0)	Swarzak (2–2)	—	**Yankee Stadium**	36,851	21–14
36	May 8	Mariners	1–10	Kikuchi (2–1)	**Loáisiga** (1–1)	—	**Yankee Stadium**	38,774	21–15
37	May 9	Mariners	3–1	**Happ** (2–3)	Leake (2–4)	**Chapman** (8)	**Yankee Stadium**	37,016	22–15
38	May 10	@ Rays	4–3	**Germán** (7–1)	Glasnow (6–1)	**Chapman** (9)	Tropicana Field	20,846	23–15
39	May 11	@ Rays	2–7	Chirinos (5–1)	**Holder** (2–1)	—	Tropicana Field	25,025	23–16
40	May 12	@ Rays	7–1	**Tanaka** (3–3)	Snell (3–4)	—	Tropicana Field	25,025	24–16
—	May 13	Orioles	Postponed (inclement weather: rain). Makeup date: May 15th (doubleheader)						
—	May 14	Orioles	Postponed (inclement weather: rain). Makeup date: August 12th (doubleheader)						
41	May 15	Orioles	5–3	**Happ** (3–3)	Hess (1–5)	**Chapman** (10)	**Yankee Stadium**	—	25–16
42	May 15	Orioles	3–1	**Germán** (8–1)	Cashner (4–2)	**Chapman** (11)	**Yankee Stadium**	41,138	26–16
43	May 17	Rays	4–3	**Holder** (3–1)	Alvarado (0–3)	—	**Yankee Stadium**	41,281	27–16
44	May 18	Rays	1–2 (11)	Wood (1–0)	**Cessa** (0–1)	Alvarado (5)	**Yankee Stadium**	43,079	27–17
45	May 19	Rays	13–5	**Ottavino** (2–1)	Castillo (0–3)	**Adams** (1)	**Yankee Stadium**	43,032	28–17
46	May 20	@ Orioles	10–7	**Britton** (2–0)	Givens (0–1)	**Chapman** (12)	Oriole Park at Camden Yards	16,457	29–17
47	May 21	@ Orioles	11–4	**Germán** (9–1)	Hess (1–6)	**Hale** (1)	Oriole Park at Camden Yards	17,389	30–17
48	May 22	@ Orioles	7–5	**Sabathia** (3–1)	Straily (1–4)	**Chapman** (13)	Oriole Park at Camden Yards	17,849	31–17
49	May 23	@ Orioles	6–5	**Kahnle** (2–0)	Givens (0–2)	**Britton** (2)	Oriole Park at Camden Yards	30,624	32–17
—	May 24	@ Royals	Postponed (inclement weather: rain). Makeup date: May 25th (doubleheader)						
50	May 25	@ Royals	7–3	**Happ** (4–3)	Barlow (1–1)		Kauffman Stadium	25,243	33–17
51	May 25	@ Royals	6–5	**Adams** (1–0)	López (0–6)	**Chapman** (14)	Kauffman Stadium	18,599	34–17
52	May 26	@ Royals	7–8 (10)	McCarthy (1–1)	**Holder** (3–2)	—	Kauffman Stadium	21,499	34–18
53	May 27	Padres	5–2	**Hale** (1–0)	Strahm (2–4)	**Chapman** (15)	**Yankee Stadium**	46,254	35–18
54	May 28	Padres	4–5	Lauer (4–4)	**Tanaka** (3–4)	Yates (21)	**Yankee Stadium**	37,028	35–19
55	May 29	Padres	7–0	**Holder** (4–2)	Paddack (4–3)	—	**Yankee Stadium**	40,918	36–19
—	May 30	Red Sox	Postponed (inclement weather: rain). Makeup date: August 3rd (doubleheader)						
56	May 31	Red Sox	4–1	**Happ** (5–3)	Sale (1–7)	**Chapman** (16)	**Yankee Stadium**	45,556	37–19

June: 17–9 (Home: 11–3; Away: 6–6)

#	Date	Opponent	Score	Win	Loss	Save	Stadium	Attendance	Record
57	June 1	Red Sox	5–3	**Green** (1–2)	Porcello (4–5)	**Chapman** (17)	**Yankee Stadium**	46,307	38–19
58	June 2	Red Sox	5–8	Price (3–2)	**Sabathia** (3–2)	Workman (2)	**Yankee Stadium**	40,068	38–20
59	June 4	@ Blue Jays	3–4	Pannone (2–3)	**Tanaka** (3–5)	Giles (11)	Rogers Centre	20,671	38–21
60	June 5	@ Blue Jays	7–11	Gaviglio (4–1)	**Britton** (2–1)	—	Rogers Centre	16,609	38–22
61	June 6	@ Blue Jays	6–2	**Happ** (6–3)	Jackson (0–4)	**Chapman** (18)	Rogers Centre	25,657	39–22
62	June 7	@ Indians	2–5	Plesac (1–1)	**Germán** (9–2)	Hand (19)	Progressive Field	31,531	39–23
63	June 8	@ Indians	4–8	Plutko (2–1)	**Sabathia** (3–3)	—	Progressive Field	32,329	39–24
64	June 9	@ Indians	7–6 (10)	**Chapman** (1–1)	Pérez (1–1)	**Tarpley** (1)	Progressive Field	29,028	40–24
—	June 10	Mets	Postponed (inclement weather: rain). Makeup date: June 11 (doubleheader)						
65	June 11	Mets	12–5	**Tanaka** (4–5)	Wheeler (5–4)	—	**Yankee Stadium**	41,538	41–24
66	June 11	Mets	4–10	Vargas (3–3)	**Paxton** (3–3)	—	**Yankee Stadium**	44,698	41–25
67	June 13	@ White Sox	4–5	Marshall (2–0)	**Ottavino** (2–2)	Bummer (1)	Guaranteed Rate Field	25,311	41–26
68	June 14	@ White Sox	2–10	Giolito (10–1)	**Sabathia** (3–4)	—	Guaranteed Rate Field	31,438	41–27
69	June 15	@ White Sox	8–4	**Cortes Jr.** (1–0)	López (4–7)	—	Guaranteed Rate Field	36,074	42–27
70	June 16	@ White Sox	10–3	**Paxton** (4–3)	Despaigne (0–2)	—	Guaranteed Rate Field	37,277	43–27
71	June 17	Rays	3–0	**Tanaka** (5–5)	Chirinos (7–3)	—	**Yankee Stadium**	39,042	44–27
72	June 18	Rays	6–3	**Happ** (7–3)	Roe (0–3)	**Chapman** (19)	**Yankee Stadium**	40,479	45–27
73	June 19	Rays	12–1	**Sabathia** (4–4)	Snell (4–6)	—	**Yankee Stadium**	41,144	46–27
74	June 20	Astros	10–6	**Cortes Jr.** (2–0)	Valdez (3–3)	**Chapman** (20)	**Yankee Stadium**	41,030	47–27
75	June 21	Astros	4–1	**Paxton** (5–3)	Peacock (6–5)	**Chapman** (21)	**Yankee Stadium**	41,166	48–27
76	June 22	Astros	7–5	**Holder** (5–2)	Pressly (1–1)	**Britton** (3)	**Yankee Stadium**	46,034	49–27
77	June 23	Astros	4–9	Verlander (10–3)	**Happ** (7–4)	—	**Yankee Stadium**	46,769	49–28
78	June 24	Blue Jays	10–8	**Sabathia** (5–4)	Sanchez (3–4)	**Chapman** (22)	**Yankee Stadium**	37,204	50–28
79	June 25	Blue Jays	4–3	**Cortes Jr.** (3–0)	Richard (0–4)	**Chapman** (23)	**Yankee Stadium**	40,119	51–28
80	June 26	Blue Jays	8–7	**Britton** (3–1)	Kingham (3–2)	—	**Yankee Stadium**	40,578	52–28
81	June 29	@ Red Sox	17–13	**Green** (2–2)	Wright (0–1)	—	London Stadium	59,659	53–28
82	June 30	@ Red Sox	12–8	**Ottavino** (3–2)	Walden (6–1)	—	London Stadium	59,059	54–28

July: 14–11 (Home: 8–4; Away: 6–7)

#	Date	Opponent	Score	Win	Loss	Save	Stadium	Attendance	Record
83	July 2	@ Mets	2–4	Lugo (4–2)	**Ottavino** (3–3)	Díaz (18)	Citi Field	42,150	54–29
84	July 3	@ Mets	5–1	**Germán** (10–2)	Vargas (3–4)	—	Citi Field	43,323	55–29
85	July 4	@ Rays	8–4 (10)	**Chapman** (2–1)	Drake (0–1)	**Hale** (2)	Tropicana Field	21,974	56–29
86	July 5	@ Rays	8–4 (11)	**Hale** (2–0)	Stanek (0–2)	**Chapman** (24)	Tropicana Field	22,182	57–29
87	July 6	@ Rays	3–4	Poche (2–1)	**Green** (2–3)	—	Tropicana Field	21,477	57–30
88	July 7	@ Rays	1–2	Morton (10–2)	**Paxton** (5–4)	Pagán (5)	Tropicana Field	20,091	57–31
**90th All-Star Game in Cleveland, Ohio**
89	July 12	Blue Jays	4–0	**Germán** (11–2)	Sanchez (3–13)	—	**Yankee Stadium**	47,162	58–31
90	July 13	Blue Jays	1–2	Biagini (3–1)	**Happ** (7–5)	Hudson (2)	**Yankee Stadium**	43,742	58–32
91	July 14	Blue Jays	4–2	**Tanaka** (6–5)	Stroman (5–10)	**Chapman** (25)	**Yankee Stadium**	42,303	59–32
92	July 15	Rays	4–5	Kittredge (1–0)	**Chapman** (2–2)	Drake (1)	**Yankee Stadium**	43,173	59–33
93	July 16	Rays	8–3	**Hale** (3–0)	Poche (2–3)	—	**Yankee Stadium**	40,401	60–33
—	July 17	Rays	Postponed (inclement weather: rain). Makeup date: July 18 (doubleheader)						
94	July 18	Rays	6–2	**German** (12–2)	Chirinos (8–5)	—	**Yankee Stadium**	—	61–33
95	July 18	Rays	5–1	**Cessa** (1–1)	Morton (11–3)	—	**Yankee Stadium**	40,504	62–33
96	July 19	Rockies	8–2	**Happ** (8–5)	Freeland (2–7)	**Tarpley** (2)	**Yankee Stadium**	44,316	63–33
97	July 20	Rockies	11–5	**Tanaka** (7–5)	Senzatela (8–7)	—	**Yankee Stadium**	41,499	64–33
98	July 21	Rockies	4–8	Márquez (9–5)	**Paxton** (5–5)	—	**Yankee Stadium**	41,841	64–34
99	July 22	@ Twins	6–8	Thorpe (1–1)	**Sabathia** (5–5)	Rogers (15)	Target Field	34,627	64–35
100	July 23	@ Twins	14–12 (10)	**Chapman** (3–2)	Stewart (2–2)	**Green** (1)	Target Field	32,470	65–35
101	July 24	@ Twins	10–7	**Cortes Jr.** (4–0)	Odorizzi (11–5)	**Chapman** (26)	Target Field	40,127	66–35
102	July 25	@ Red Sox	3–19	Porcello (9–7)	**Tanaka** (7–6)	—	Fenway Park	37,591	66–36
103	July 26	@ Red Sox	5–10	Cashner (10–5)	**Paxton** (5–6)	—	Fenway Park	37,095	66–37
104	July 27	@ Red Sox	5–9	Rodríguez (13–4)	**Sabathia** (5–6)	—	Fenway Park	36,862	66–38
105	July 28	@ Red Sox	9–6	**Germán** (13–2)	Sale (5–10)	—	Fenway Park	37,429	67–38
106	July 30	Diamondbacks	2–4	Clarke (4–3)	**Happ** (8–6)	Bradley (1)	**Yankee Stadium**	47,281	67–39
107	July 31	Diamondbacks	7–5	**Ottavino** (4–3)	Hirano (3–5)	**Chapman** (27)	**Yankee Stadium**	43,979	68–39

August: 21–9 (Home: 11–3; Away: 10–6)

#	Date	Opponent	Score	Win	Loss	Save	Stadium	Attendance	Record
108	August 2	Red Sox	4–2	**Paxton** (6–6)	Rodríguez (13–5)	**Chapman** (28)	**Yankee Stadium**	46,932	69–39
109	August 3	Red Sox	9–2	**Germán** (14–2)	Sale (5–11)	—	**Yankee Stadium**	46,625	70–39
110	August 3	Red Sox	6–4	**Kahnle** (3–0)	Barnes (3–4)	**Chapman** (29)	**Yankee Stadium**	48,101	71–39
111	August 4	Red Sox	7–4	**Happ** (9–6)	Price (7–5)	**Green** (2)	**Yankee Stadium**	47,267	72–39
112	August 5	@ Orioles	9–6	**Ottavino** (5–3)	Fry (1–4)	**Chapman** (30)	Oriole Park at Camden Yards	20,151	73–39
113	August 6	@ Orioles	9–4	**Cortes Jr.** (5–0)	Wojciechowski (2–5)	**Ottavino** (1)	Oriole Park at Camden Yards	17,201	74–39
114	August 7	@ Orioles	14–2	**Paxton** (7–6)	Means (8–7)	—	Oriole Park at Camden Yards	16,299	75–39
115	August 8	@ Blue Jays	12–6	**Germán** (15–2)	Pannone (2–5)	**Cessa** (1)	Rogers Centre	34,108	76–39
116	August 9	@ Blue Jays	2–8	Reid-Foley (2–2)	**Happ** (9–7)	—	Rogers Centre	25,782	76–40
117	August 10	@ Blue Jays	4–5	Adam (1–0)	**Ottavino** (5–4)	Law (3)	Rogers Centre	33,903	76–41
118	August 11	@ Blue Jays	1–0	**Tanaka** (8–6)	Thornton (4–8)	**Chapman** (31)	Rogers Centre	27,790	77–41
119	August 12	Orioles	8–5	**Paxton** (8–6)	Ynoa (1–7)	**Chapman** (32)	**Yankee Stadium**	42,843	78–41
120	August 12	Orioles	11–8	**Mantiply** (1–0)	Blach (0–1)	**Ottavino** (2)	**Yankee Stadium**	40,354	79–41
121	August 13	Orioles	8–3	**Germán** (16–2)	Means (8–8)	—	**Yankee Stadium**	41,284	80–41
122	August 14	Orioles	6–5	**Happ** (10–7)	Bundy (5–13)	**Chapman** (33)	**Yankee Stadium**	43,909	81–41
123	August 15	Indians	5–19	Plutko (5–3)	**Green** (2–4)	—	**Yankee Stadium**	44,654	81–42
124	August 16	Indians	3–2	**Tanaka** (9–6)	Civale (1–2)	**Chapman** (34)	**Yankee Stadium**	45,015	82–42
125	August 17	Indians	6–5	**Paxton** (9–6)	Plesac (6–4)	**Chapman** (35)	**Yankee Stadium**	47,347	83–42
126	August 18	Indians	4–8	Clevinger (8–2)	**Sabathia** (5–7)	—	**Yankee Stadium**	45,682	83–43
127	August 20	@ Athletics	2–6	Bailey (11–8)	**Germán** (16–3)	—	Oakland–Alameda County Coliseum	21,471	83–44
128	August 21	@ Athletics	4–6	Fiers (12–3)	**Happ** (10–8)	Hendriks (15)	Oakland–Alameda County Coliseum	22,017	83–45
129	August 22	@ Athletics	3–5	Roark (8–8)	**Tanaka** (9–7)	Soria (1)	Oakland–Alameda County Coliseum	24,758	83–46
130	August 23	@ Dodgers	10–2	**Paxton** (10–6)	Ryu (12–4)	—	Dodger Stadium	53,775	84–46
131	August 24	@ Dodgers	1–2	Gonsolin (2–1)	**Sabathia** (5–8)	Jansen (27)	Dodger Stadium	53,803	84–47
132	August 25	@ Dodgers	5–1	**Germán** (17–3)	Kershaw (13–3)	—	Dodger Stadium	53,828	85–47
133	August 26	@ Mariners	5–4	**Happ** (11–8)	Milone (3–8)	**Chapman** (36)	T-Mobile Park	23,030	86–47
134	August 27	@ Mariners	7–0	**Tanaka** (10–7)	Kikuchi (5–9)	—	T-Mobile Park	23,129	87–47
135	August 28	@ Mariners	7–3	**Paxton** (11–6)	Sheffield (0–1)	—	T-Mobile Park	32,013	88–47
136	August 30	Athletics	2–8	Anderson (11–9)	**Kahnle** (3–1)	—	**Yankee Stadium**	47,625	88–48
137	August 31	Athletics	4–3 (11)	**Gearrin** (1–2)	Trivino (4–6)	—	**Yankee Stadium**	44,462	89–48

September: 14–11 (Home: 7–3; Away: 7–8)

#	Date	Opponent	Score	Win	Loss	Save	Stadium	Attendance	Record
138	September 1	Athletics	5–4	**Ottavino** (6–4)	Hendriks (4–2)	—	**Yankee Stadium**	42,860	90–48
139	September 2	Rangers	0–7	Minor (12–8)	**Tanaka** (10–8)	—	**Yankee Stadium**	40,015	90–49
140	September 3	Rangers	10–1	**Paxton** (12–6)	Vólquez (0–1)	—	**Yankee Stadium**	33,711	91–49
141	September 4	Rangers	4–1	**Cessa** (2–1)	Lynn (14–10)	—	**Yankee Stadium**	36,082	92–49
142	September 6	@ Red Sox	1–6	Walden (9–2)	**Germán** (17–4)	—	Fenway Park	35,162	92–50
143	September 7	@ Red Sox	5–1	**Happ** (12–8)	Weber (2–3)	—	Fenway Park	36,619	93–50
144	September 8	@ Red Sox	10–5	**Green** (3–4)	Porcello (12–12)	—	Fenway Park	35,681	94–50
145	September 9	@ Red Sox	5–0	**Paxton** (13–6)	Rodríguez (17–6)	—	Fenway Park	35,884	95–50
146	September 10	@ Tigers	11–12	Jiménez (4–7)	**Adams** (1–1)	—	Comerica Park	16,733	95–51
—	September 11	@ Tigers	Postponed (inclement weather: rain). Makeup date: September 12 (doubleheader)						
147	September 12	@ Tigers	10–4	**Green** (4–4)	Boyd (8–11)	—	Comerica Park	—	96–51
148	September 12	@ Tigers	6–4	**Germán** (18–4)	Turnbull (3–15)	**Chapman** (37)	Comerica Park	17,807	97–51
149	September 13	@ Blue Jays	5–6 (12)	Font (4–4)	**Lyons** (1–2)	—	Rogers Centre	23,915	97–52
150	September 14	@ Blue Jays	13–3	**Paxton** (14–6)	Waguespack (4–5)	—	Rogers Centre	26,308	98–52
151	September 15	@ Blue Jays	4–6	Zeuch (1–0)	**Cortes Jr.** (5–1)	Giles (20)	Rogers Centre	22,562	98–53
152	September 17	Angels	8–0	**Loáisiga** (2–1)	Ramirez (5–4)	—	**Yankee Stadium**	41,026	99–53
153	September 18	Angels	2–3	Bard (2–2)	**Ottavino** (6–5)	Robles (22)	**Yankee Stadium**	38,106	99–54
154	September 19	Angels	9–1	**Tanaka** (11–8)	Heaney (4–6)	—	**Yankee Stadium**	42,056	100–54
155	September 20	Blue Jays	3–4	Adam (2–0)	**Kahnle** (3–2)	Giles (21)	**Yankee Stadium**	45,270	100–55
156	September 21	Blue Jays	7–2	**Paxton** (15–6)	Zeuch (1–1)	—	**Yankee Stadium**	43,602	101–55
157	September 22	Blue Jays	8–3	**Severino** (1–0)	Font (4–5)	—	**Yankee Stadium**	44,583	102–55
158	September 24	@ Rays	1–2 (12)	Fairbanks (2–3)	**Gearrin** (1–3)	—	Tropicana Field	16,669	102–56
159	September 25	@ Rays	0–4	Morton (16–6)	**Loáisiga** (2–2)	—	Tropicana Field	20,390	102–57
160	September 27	@ Rangers	14–7	**Tarpley** (1–0)	Palumbo (0–3)	—	Globe Life Park in Arlington	35,168	103–57
161	September 28	@ Rangers	4–9	Hernández (2–1)	**Severino** (1–1)	—	Globe Life Park in Arlington	42,870	103–58
162	September 29	@ Rangers	1–6	Lynn (16–11)	**Tanaka** (11–9)	—	Globe Life Park in Arlington	47,144	103–59

== Player stats ==
Note: Team leaders in each category are noted in bold.

=== Batting ===
Note: G = Games played; AB = At bats; R = Runs; H = Hits; 2B = Doubles; 3B = Triples; HR = Home runs; RBI = Runs batted in; SB = Stolen bases; BB = Walks; AVG = Batting average; SLG = Slugging average

Player	G	AB	R	H	2B	3B	HR	RBI	SB	BB	AVG	SLG
DJ LeMahieu	145	**602**	**109**	**197**	33	2	26	**102**	5	46	**.327**	.518
Gleyber Torres	**144**	546	96	152	26	0	**38**	90	5	48	.278	**.535**
Brett Gardner	141	491	86	123	26	**7**	28	74	**10**	52	.251	.503
Gio Urshela	132	442	73	139	**34**	0	21	74	1	25	.314	.534
Luke Voit	118	429	72	113	21	1	21	62	0	**71**	.263	.464
Gary Sánchez	106	396	62	92	12	1	34	77	0	40	.232	.525
Aaron Judge	102	378	75	103	18	1	27	55	3	64	.272	.540
Didi Gregorius	82	324	47	77	14	2	16	61	2	17	.238	.441
Mike Tauchman	87	260	46	72	18	1	13	47	6	34	.277	.504
Cameron Maybin	82	239	48	68	17	0	11	32	9	30	.285	.494
Austin Romine	72	228	29	64	12	0	8	35	1	10	.281	.439
Clint Frazier	69	225	31	60	14	0	12	38	1	16	.267	.489
Aaron Hicks	59	221	41	52	10	0	12	36	1	31	.235	.443
Edwin Encarnación	44	177	33	44	11	0	13	37	0	17	.249	.531
Mike Ford	50	143	30	37	7	0	12	25	0	17	.259	.559
Tyler Wade	43	94	16	23	3	1	2	11	7	11	.245	.362
Thairo Estrada	35	64	12	16	3	0	3	12	4	3	.250	.438
Kendrys Morales	19	62	7	11	1	0	1	5	0	12	.177	.242
Giancarlo Stanton	18	59	8	17	3	0	3	13	0	12	.288	.492
Kyle Higashioka	18	56	8	12	5	0	3	11	0	0	.214	.464
Miguel Andújar	12	47	1	6	0	0	0	1	0	1	.128	.128
Greg Bird	16	35	6	6	0	0	1	1	0	6	.171	.257
Breyvic Valera	12	32	5	7	1	1	0	3	0	4	.219	.313
Troy Tulowitzki	5	11	1	2	1	0	1	1	0	2	.182	.545
Pitcher totals	162	22	1	0	0	0	0	1	0	0	.000	.000
**Team totals**	**162**	**5583**	**943**	**1493**	**290**	**17**	**306**	**904**	**55**	**569**	**.267**	**.490**

=== Pitching ===
Note: W = Wins; L = Losses; ERA = Earned run average; G = Games pitched; GS = Games started; SV = Saves; IP = Innings pitched; H = Hits allowed; R = Runs allowed; ER = Earned runs allowed; BB = Walks allowed; SO = Strikeouts

Player	W	L	ERA	G	GS	SV	IP	H	R	ER	BB	SO
Masahiro Tanaka	11	**9**	**4.45**	32	**31**	0	**182.0**	**186**	**95**	**90**	40	149
J. A. Happ	12	8	4.91	31	30	0	161.1	160	88	88	49	140
James Paxton	15	6	3.82	29	29	0	150.2	138	71	64	**55**	**186**
Domingo Germán	**18**	4	4.03	27	24	0	143.0	125	69	64	39	153
CC Sabathia	5	8	4.95	23	22	0	107.1	112	64	59	39	107
Luis Cessa	2	1	4.11	43	0	1	81.0	75	42	37	31	75
Chad Green	4	4	4.17	54	15	2	69.0	66	35	32	19	98
Nestor Cortés Jr.	5	1	5.67	33	1	0	66.2	75	44	42	28	69
Adam Ottavino	6	5	1.90	**73**	0	2	66.1	47	17	14	40	88
Zack Britton	3	1	1.91	66	0	3	61.1	38	13	13	32	53
Tommy Kahnle	3	2	3.67	72	0	0	61.1	45	27	25	20	88
Aroldis Chapman	3	2	2.21	60	0	**37**	57.0	38	18	14	25	85
Jonathan Holder	5	2	6.31	34	1	0	41.1	43	32	29	11	46
David Hale	3	0	3.11	20	0	2	37.2	39	13	13	7	23
Jonathan Loáisiga	2	2	4.55	15	4	0	31.2	31	16	16	16	37
Chance Adams	1	1	8.53	13	0	1	25.1	39	25	24	11	23
Stephen Tarpley	1	0	6.93	21	1	2	24.2	34	20	19	15	34
Cory Gearrin	1	1	4.50	18	0	0	14.0	17	7	7	4	8'
Luis Severino	1	1	1.50	3	3	0	12.0	6	2	2	6	17
Joe Harvey	1	0	4.50	9	0	0	10.0	11	6	5	7	11
Tyler Lyons	0	1	4.15	11	0	0	8.2	7	4	4	2	12
Ben Heller	0	0	1.23	6	0	0	7.1	6	1	1	3	9
Jordan Montgomery	0	0	6.75	2	1	0	4.0	7	3	3	0	5
Jake Barrett	0	0	14.73	2	0	0	3.2	6	6	6	2	4
Joe Mantiply	1	0	9.00	1	0	0	3.0	3	3	3	2	2
Brady Lail	0	0	10.13	1	0	0	2.2	2	3	3	1	2
Ryan Dull	0	0	19.29	3	0	0	2.1	5	5	5	3	4
Michael King	0	0	0.00	1	0	0	2.0	2	1	0	0	1
Mike Ford	0	0	22.50	1	0	0	2.0	6	5	5	0	1
Adonis Rosa	0	0	4.50	1	0	0	2.0	1	1	1	0	2
Austin Romine	0	0	27.00	1	0	0	1.0	4	3	3	0	0
Dellin Betances	0	0	0.00	1	0	0	0.2	0	0	0	0	2
**Team totals**	**103**	**59**	**4.31**	**162**	**162**	**50**	**1443.0**	**1374**	**739**	**691**	**507**	**1534**

=== Postseason ===
2019 Postseason game log (5–4) (Home: 3–2; Away: 2–2)
American League Division Series: 3–0 (Home: 2–0; Away 1–0)

#	Date	Opponent	Stadium	Score	Win	Loss	Save	Attendance	Record
1	October 4	Twins	**Yankee Stadium**	10–4	**Kanhle** (1–0)	Littell (0–1)	—	49,233	1–0
2	October 5	Twins	**Yankee Stadium**	8–2	**Tanaka** (1–0)	Dobnak (0–1)	—	49,277	2–0
3	October 7	@ Twins	Target Field	5–1	**Green** (1–0)	Odorizzi (0–1)	**Chapman** (1)	41,121	3–0

American League Championship Series: 2−4 (Home 1−2; Away 1−2)

#	Date	Opponent	Stadium	Score	Win	Loss	Save	Attendance	Record
1	October 12	@ Astros	Minute Maid Park	7–0	**Tanaka** (1–0)	Greinke (0–1)	—	43,311	1–0
2	October 13	@ Astros	Minute Maid Park	2–3 (11)	James (1–0)	**Happ** (0–1)	—	43,359	1–1
3	October 15	Astros	**Yankee Stadium**	1–4	Cole (1–0)	**Severino** (0–1)	Osuna (1)	48,998	1–2
—	October 16	Astros	Postponed (Inclement Weather, makeup date on October 17)						
4	October 17	Astros	**Yankee Stadium**	3–8	Pressly (1–0)	**Tanaka** (1–1)	—	49,067	1–3
5	October 18	Astros	**Yankee Stadium**	4–1	**Paxton** (1−0)	Verlander (0−1)	**Chapman** (1)	48,483	2–3
6	October 19	@ Astros	Minute Maid Park	4–6	Osuna (1–0)	**Chapman** (0–1)	—	43,357	2–4

== Postseason rosters ==
Playoff rosters
American League Division Series

- Pitchers: 0 Adam Ottavino 19 Masahiro Tanaka 34 J. A. Happ 40 Luis Severino 43 Jonathan Loáisiga 48 Tommy Kahnle 53 Zack Britton 54 Aroldis Chapman 57 Chad Green 65 James Paxton 70 Tyler Lyons 85 Luis Cessa
- Catchers: 24 Gary Sánchez 28 Austin Romine
- Infielders: 14 Tyler Wade 18 Didi Gregorius 25 Gleyber Torres 26 DJ LeMahieu 29 Gio Urshela 45 Luke Voit
- Outfielders: 11 Brett Gardner 27 Giancarlo Stanton 38 Cameron Maybin 99 Aaron Judge
- Designated hitters: 30 Edwin Encarnación

American League Championship Series

- Pitchers: 0 Adam Ottavino 19 Masahiro Tanaka 34 J. A. Happ 40 Luis Severino 43 Jonathan Loáisiga 48 Tommy Kahnle 52 CC Sabathia (Games 1–4) 53 Zack Britton 54 Aroldis Chapman 57 Chad Green 61 Ben Heller (Games 5–6) 65 James Paxton 70 Tyler Lyons 85 Luis Cessa
- Catchers: 24 Gary Sánchez 28 Austin Romine
- Infielders: 18 Didi Gregorius 25 Gleyber Torres 26 DJ LeMahieu 29 Gio Urshela
- Outfielders: 11 Brett Gardner 27 Giancarlo Stanton 31 Aaron Hicks 38 Cameron Maybin 99 Aaron Judge
- Designated hitters: 30 Edwin Encarnación

== Honors ==
=== All-Stars ===
The team delegates for the 2019 All-Star Game were DJ LeMahieu, Gary Sanchez, Gleyber Torres, Masahiro Tanaka and Aroldis Chapman, which represented the team as part of the winning American League team that won in Cleveland 4–3 against the National League. Tanaka and Chapman made history as they were for the first time since the save was officially adopted in the late 60s as the first ever Yankees to get the All-Star Game win and save, respectively (last time this happened was in 1947). While DJ and Gary were voted by the fans, the first under a new voting system that was first implemented that year, Chapman was later appointed as part of the AL bullpen while Tanaka and Torres joined in at the last minute as replacement players.

== Farm system ==
Level	Team	League	Manager
AAA	Scranton/Wilkes-Barre RailRiders	International League	Jay Bell
AA	Trenton Thunder	Eastern League	Patrick Osborn
A	Tampa Tarpons	Florida State League	Aaron Holbert
A	Charleston RiverDogs	South Atlantic League	Julio Mosquera
A-Short Season	Staten Island Yankees	New York–Penn League	David Adams
Rookie	Pulaski Yankees	Appalachian League	Luis Dorante
Rookie	GCL Yankees 1 (East)	Gulf Coast League	Dan Fiorito
Rookie	GCL Yankees 2 (West)	Gulf Coast League	Nick Ortiz
Rookie	DSL Yankees 1	Dominican Summer League	Caonabo Cosme
Rookie	DSL Yankees 2	Dominican Summer League	Oscar Escobar

LEAGUE CHAMPIONS: Trenton

== Draft ==
The Yankees owned two first rounds selections of the 2019 MLB draft: the 30th overall pick and a pick from the Competitive Balance Round A (the 38th overall) they acquired from the Cincinnati Reds.

2019 New York Yankees draft picks

Round	Pick	Name	Position	School	Signed?	Signing bonus
1	30	Anthony Volpe	2B	Delbarton School	yes	$2.74m
CBA	38	T. J. Sikkema	P	Missouri	yes	$1.95m
2	67	Josh Smith	P	LSU	yes	$976.7k
3	105	Jacob Sanford	CF	Western Kentucky	yes	$597.5k
4	135	Jake Agnos	P	East Carolina	yes	$411.5k
5	165	Ken Waldichuk	P	Saint Mary's (CA)	yes	$307k
6	195	Hayden Wesneski	P	Sam Houston State	yes	$217.5k
7	225	Nick Paciorek	P	Northwestern	yes	$162.5k
8	255	Zach Greene	P	South Alabama	yes	$17.5k
9	285	Henson Spencer	1B	Oral Roberts	yes	$137.5k
10	315	Mitch Spence	P	USC Aiken	yes	$122.5k
11	345	Oliver Dunn	2B	Utah	yes	$137.5k
12	375	Ryan Anderson	P	Nevada	yes	$125k
13	405	Nelson L. Alvarez	P	South Florida	yes	$125k
14	435	Kevin Milam	P	Saint Mary's (CA)	yes	$125k
15	465	Edgar Barclay	P	CSU Bakersfield	yes	$125k
16	495	Shaine McNeely	P	Hope International	yes	$125k
17	525	Pat DeMarco	CF	Vanderbilt	yes	$297k
18	555	Evan Voliva	P	East Carolina	yes	$10k
19	585	Chad Bell	3B	Louisiana–Monroe	yes	$10k
20	615	Jack Leiter	P	Delbarton School	no	
21	645	Zach Kohn	P	Central Michigan	yes	$125k
22	675	Gerrit van Zijll	P	Alvin Community College	yes	$125k
23	705	Matt Minnick	P	Mercyhurst	yes	$10k
24	735	Jake Pries	OF	UCLA	yes	$7.5k
25	765	Luke Brown	CF	John A. Logan College	no	
26	795	Ryan Brown	P	South Salem High School	no	
27	825	Kyle MacDonald	1B	Arkansas State	yes	$5k
28	855	Michael Giacone	P	North Greenville	yes	$75k
29	885	Chase Illig	C	West Virginia	yes	$5k
30	915	Zachary Maxwell	P	North Paulding High School	no	
31	945	Chad Knight	C	Staples High School	no	
32	975	Ethan Hoopingarner	P	Aliso Niguel	no	
33	1005	Javier Reynoso	SS	Colegio Ángel David (PR)	yes	$125k
34	1035	Joey Lancellotti	P	North Carolina	no	
35	1065	Nathaniel Espelin	P	The Winchendon School	no	
36	1095	Montana Semmel	P	Westhill High School	no	
37	1125	Bryce Jarvis	P	Duke	no	
38	1155	Dontae Mitchell	CF	Lakewood High School (FL)	no	
39	1185	Jake Farrell	1B	Northeastern	yes	$5k
40	1215	Alex Garbrick	P	Morehead State	no	
