= Greg Bird =

Greg Bird may refer to:

- Greg Bird (rugby league) (born 1984), Australian rugby league player
- Greg Bird (baseball) (born 1992), American baseball player
