= Mike Tauchman =

American baseball player (born 1990)

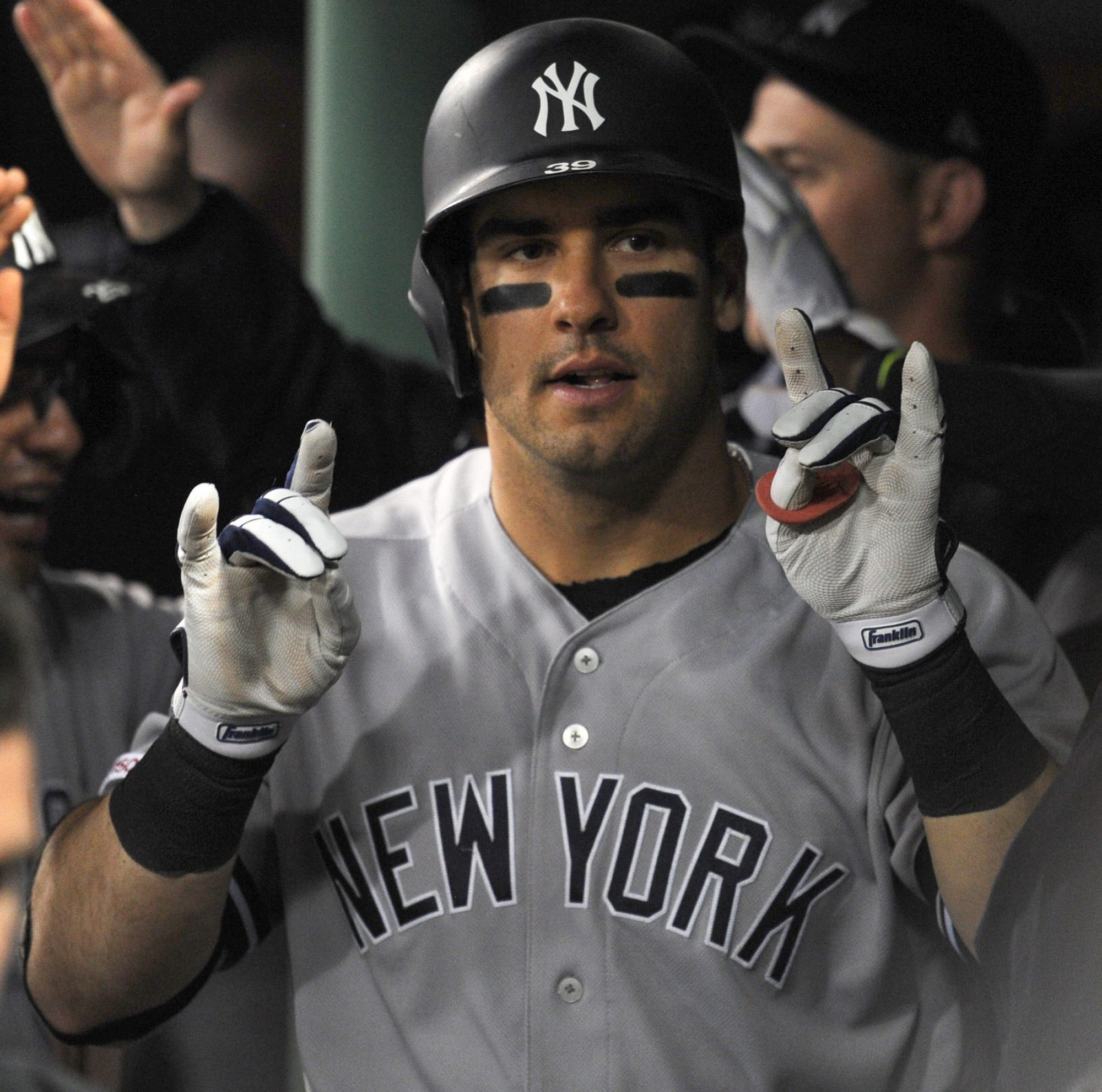
- Tauchman with the New York Yankees in 2019

Free agent
- Outfielder
- Born: December 3, 1990 (age 35); Palatine, Illinois, U.S.
- Bats: Left Throws: Left

Professional debut
- MLB: June 27, 2017, for the Colorado Rockies
- KBO: April 2, 2022, for the Hanwha Eagles

MLB statistics (through 2025 season)
- Batting average: .246
- Home runs: 41
- Runs batted in: 195

KBO statistics (through 2022 season)
- Batting average: .289
- Home runs: 12
- Runs batted in: 43
- Stats at Baseball Reference

Teams
- Colorado Rockies (2017–2018); New York Yankees (2019–2021); San Francisco Giants (2021); Hanwha Eagles (2022); Chicago Cubs (2023–2024); Chicago White Sox (2025)

Career highlights and awards
- KBO All-Star (2022)

Michael Robert Tauchman (born December 3, 1990) is an American professional baseball outfielder who is a free agent. He has previously played in Major League Baseball (MLB) for the Colorado Rockies, New York Yankees, San Francisco Giants, Chicago Cubs, and Chicago White Sox, and in the KBO League for the Hanwha Eagles. In his senior year of college in 2013 at Bradley University he batted .425, leading all NCAA Division I baseball players. The Rockies selected Tauchman in the 10th round of the 2013 MLB draft. He made his MLB debut in 2017.

== Early life ==
Tauchman attended William Fremd High School in Palatine, Illinois, where he played baseball, and was also the quarterback and safety for the football team. In baseball, he batted .490 and was named Mid-Suburban League West Player of the Year as a senior. In football, he led a second-half comeback against future NFL quarterback Jimmy Garoppolo in a game during his senior year.

He attended Bradley University, majored in business management & administration, and played college baseball for the Bradley Braves. In 2013, his senior year, Tauchman batted .425 (leading all NCAA Division I)/.513 (leading the Missouri Valley Conference)/.591(1st) with 52 runs (2nd), 15 doubles (6th), 5 triples (3rd), 2 home runs, 41 RBIs (8th), 10 HBP (4th), and 28 stolen bases (2nd) in 30 attempts. He won the 2013 MVC Baseball Player of the Year Award, was a Rawlings/American Baseball Coaches Association First Team All-American, First Team All-MVC, and named to the MVC All-Defensive Team.

== Professional career ==
=== Colorado Rockies ===
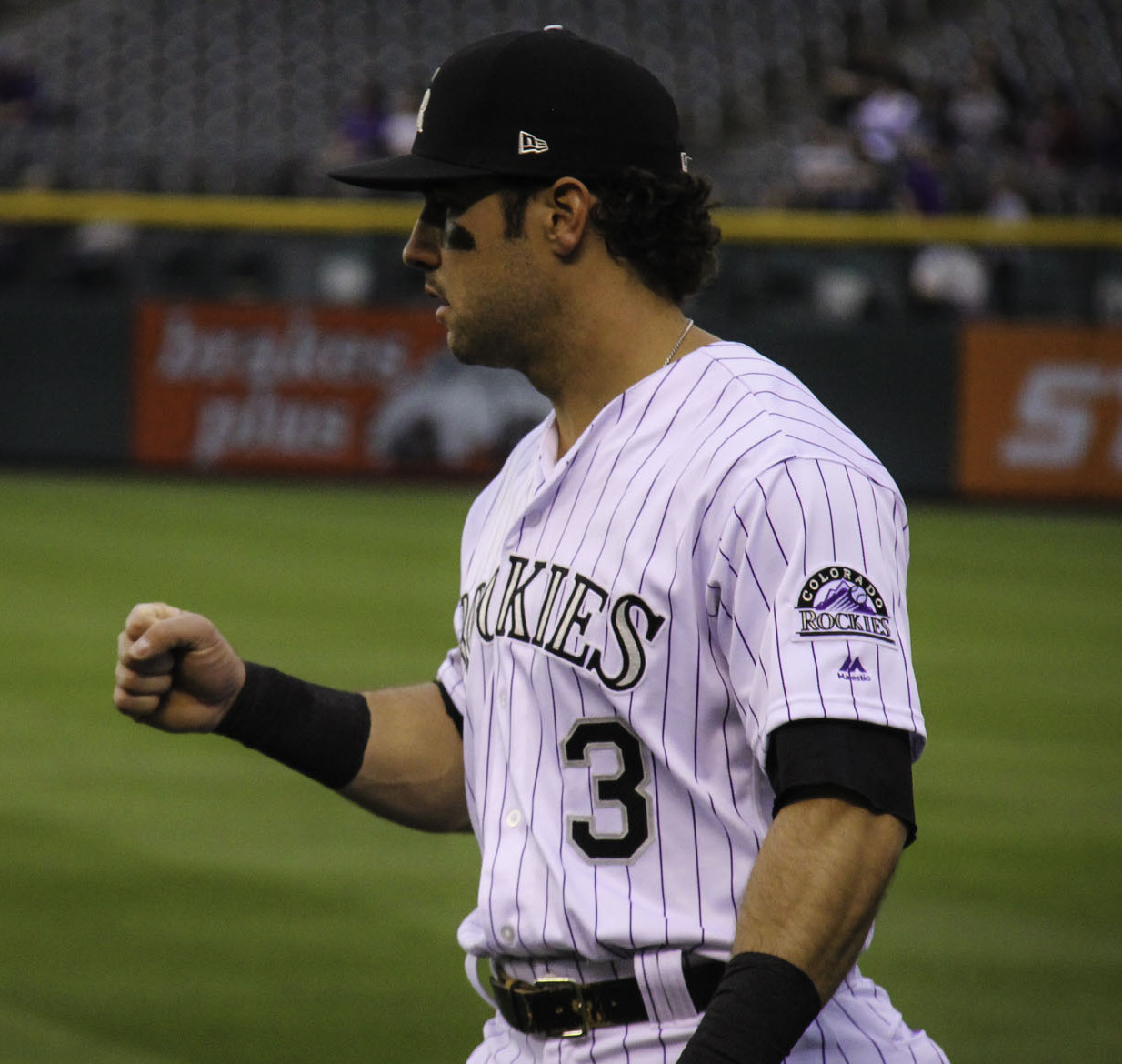
Tauchman with the Colorado Rockies in 2018

The Colorado Rockies selected Tauchman in the 10th round of the 2013 MLB draft. In 2013 he played for the Short-Season Tri-City Dust Devils and batted .297/.388/.377 with 38 runs (5th in the league), 3 triples (4th), 33 walks (7th), and 20 stolen bases (3rd) in 236 at bats, and was named a Northwest League Mid-Season All-Star. In 2014 he played for Tri-City and then for the High-A California League Modesto Nuts, batting a combined .293/.384/.437 with 4 home runs, 22 RBIs and 15 stolen bases in 222 at bats.

In 2015 Tauchman played for the Double-A New Britain Rock Cats, batted .294 (4th in the league)/.355/.381 with 62 runs (10th), 6 triples (3rd), 3 home runs, 43 RBIs, 47 walks (7th), and 25 stolen bases (5th) in 507 at bats, and was named an Eastern League Post-Season All-Star. In 2016 he played for the Triple-A Albuquerque Isotopes, batting .286/.342/.373 with one home run, 51 RBIs, 6 sacrifice hits (6th in the league), and 23 stolen bases (2nd) in 475 at bats. He then played for Águilas del Zulia in the Venezuelan Winter League, batting .269/.343/.328 with one home run, nine RBI, and five stolen bases (10th in the league) in 119 at bats over 31 games.

In 2017, Tauchman began the year with the Triple-A Albuquerque Isotopes and batted .331 (3rd in the league)/.386/.555, with 8 triples (9th), 16 home runs, 80 RBI (8th), 3 intentional walks, and 10 sacrifice flies (1st) in 420 at-bats, and was named a Pacific Coast League Post-Season All-Star and an MiLB.com Organization All-Star.

The Rockies called Tauchman up to the majors for the first time on June 27, 2017. He went 6-for-27 (.222) with two RBI in 31 appearances during his rookie campaign for Colorado.

Playing again for Albuquerque, Tauchman was named PCL Player of the Week for May 14–20, 2018, after batting .417 with eight runs, five home runs, eight RBI, 27 total bases, two multi-homer games, and a slugging percentage of 1.125. For the 2018 season in the PCL, he batted .323/.408/.571(7th in the league) with 20 home runs (6th), 81 RBI (6th), and 6 sacrifice flies (6th) in 403 at bats, and was named a Mid-Season and Post-Season PCL All-Star and an MiLB.com Organization All-Star. He also played in 21 major league games in 2018, batting 3-for-32.

In his minor league career through 2019, Tauchman played 278 games in center field, 208 games in left field, and 120 games in right field. He batted .303/.375/.453 in 2,358 at-bats.

=== New York Yankees ===
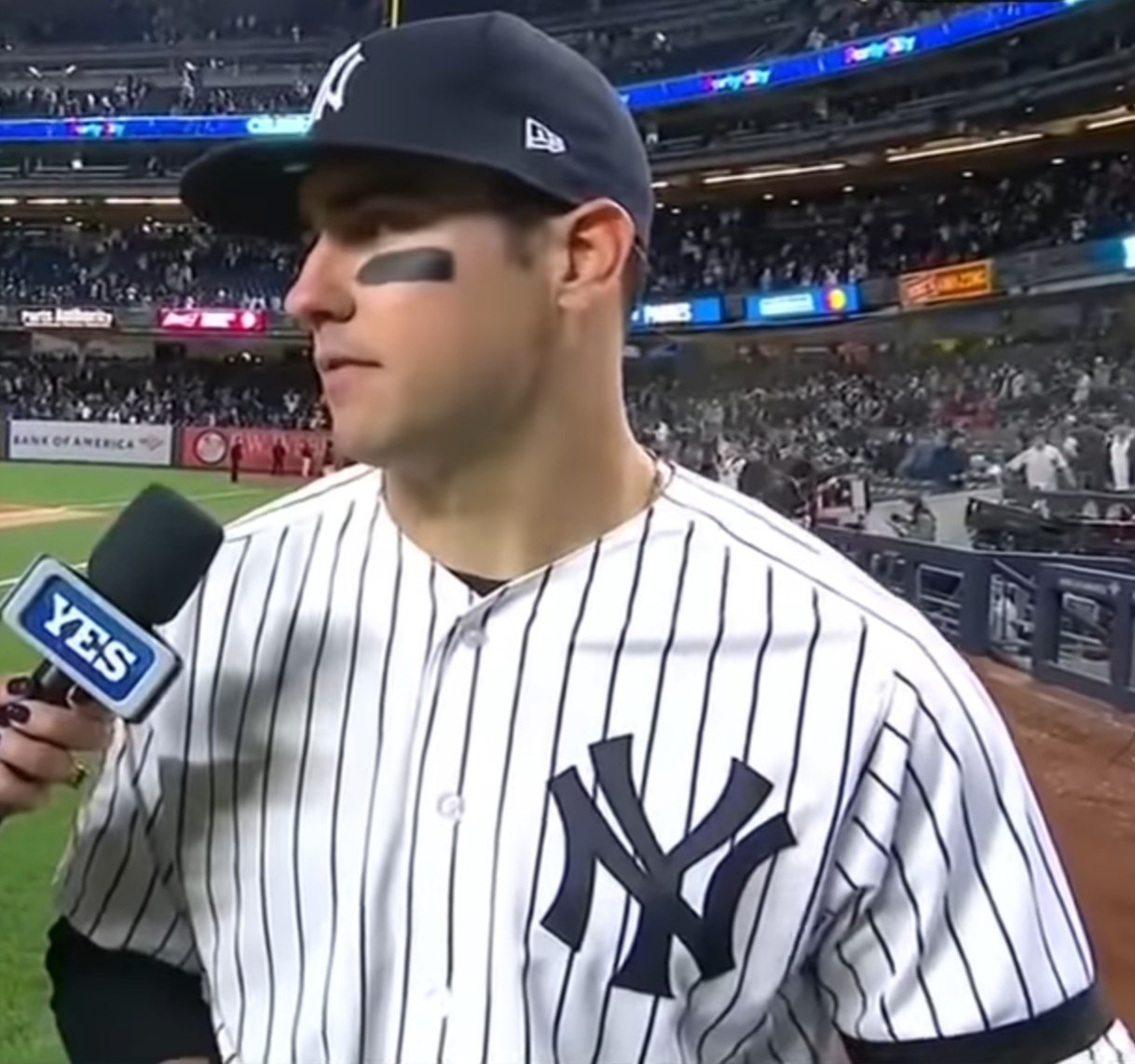
Tauchman with the New York Yankees in 2019

On March 23, 2019, the Rockies traded Tauchman to the New York Yankees in exchange for pitcher Phil Diehl. He made the Yankees' Opening Day roster. On September 10 he was placed on the 10-day injured list with a left calf strain. He batted .277/.361/.504 with 13 home runs, 47 RBIs, and 6 stolen bases without being caught in 260 at bats over 87 games for the Yankees. He saw 4.34 pitches per plate appearance, the highest rate of anyone on the Yankees roster who had at least 200 plate appearances. He was second in the AL in percentage of balls hit to the opposite field, at 35.3%, behind only Luis Arráez. He played all three outfield positions during the season, playing 473 innings in left field, 122 in right field, and 100 in center field. He also batted .274/.386/.505 in 95 at bats for the Triple-A Scranton/Wilkes-Barre RailRiders of the International League.

During the 2020 season for the Yankees, Tauchman batted .242/.342/.305 in 95 at bats with 14 RBIs and 6 stolen bases without being caught, and hampered by a lingering right shoulder injury did not hit any home runs. He began the 2021 season with the Yankees, with whom he had 14 at bats.

=== San Francisco Giants ===
On April 27, 2021, the Yankees traded Tauchman to the San Francisco Giants in exchange for pitcher Wandy Peralta and Connor Cannon. On May 28, Tauchman robbed Albert Pujols of a walk-off home run. 11 days later, he hit his first MLB career grand slam to take the lead against the Texas Rangers. Three days after the grand slam, Tauchman robbed Juan Soto of a game-tying home run to keep Anthony DeSclafani's shutout intact.

On July 29, Tauchman was designated for assignment after hitting .178 with an OPS of .569 in 152 at bats. On August 2, Tauchman cleared waivers and was outrighted to the Triple-A Sacramento River Cats. On October 13, Tauchman elected free agency.

=== Hanwha Eagles ===
On December 9, 2021, Tauchman signed a one-year contract for $1 million with the Hanwha Eagles of the KBO League. In 2022, he batted .289/.366/.430 with 12 home runs in 575 at-bats, and was named an All-Star for Hanwha. He became a free agent after the year.

=== Chicago Cubs ===
On January 13, 2023, Tauchman signed a minor league contract with the Chicago Cubs organization. He began the year with the Triple-A Iowa Cubs, playing in 24 games and hitting .279/.427/.443 with three home runs and 15 RBI. On May 19, Tauchman was selected to the active roster.

On July 28, 2023, with the Cubs leading the St. Louis Cardinals 3-2 with two outs in the bottom of the 9th inning, Tauchman robbed Alec Burleson of a walk-off home run. In 108 games for Chicago in 2023, he batted .252/.363/.377 with eight home runs, 48 RBI, and seven stolen bases.

Tauchman made 109 appearances for the Cubs in 2024, slashing .248/.357/.366 with seven home runs, 29 RBI, and six stolen bases. On November 22, 2024, the Cubs non–tendered Tauchman, making him a free agent.

=== Chicago White Sox ===
On December 11, 2024, Tauchman signed a one–year, $1.95 million contract with the Chicago White Sox. He made 93 appearances for Chicago during the 2025 campaign, batting .263/.356/.400 with nine home runs and 40 RBI. On September 24, 2025, Tauchman was placed on the injured list after suffering a right meniscus tear, and missed the remainder of the season. On November 21, he was non-tendered by Chicago and became a free agent.

=== New York Mets ===
On February 16, 2026, Tauchman signed a minor league contract with the New York Mets. On March 22, it was revealed that Tauchman had suffered a torn meniscus in his left knee. He was subsequently ruled out for six weeks after undergoing surgery. Tauchman made 18 appearances split between the rookie–level Florida Complex League Mets, Single–A St. Lucie Mets, Double–A Binghamton Rumble Ponies, and Triple–A Syracuse Mets, posting a cumulative .213/.343/.262 batting line with one RBI and 10 walks. On August 5, Tauchman was released by the Mets after exercising the opt–out clause in his contract.

== Personal life ==
Tauchman and his wife, Eileen, married in January 2017.

== See also ==
- 2013 College Baseball All-America Team
