= Mike Ford (baseball) =

American baseball player (born 1992)

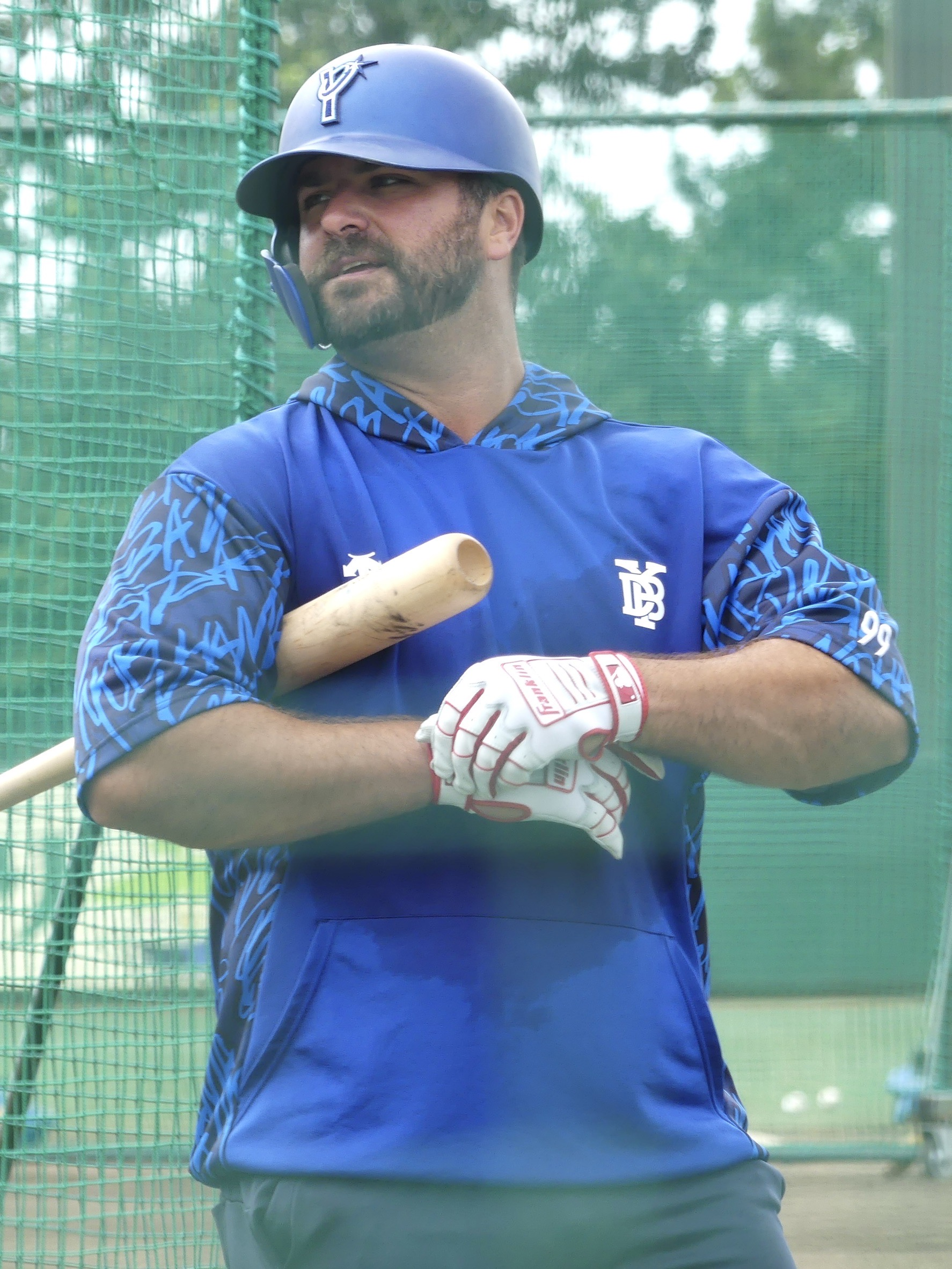
- Ford with the Yokohama DeNA BayStars
- First baseman
- Born: July 4, 1992 (age 34); Belle Mead, New Jersey, U.S.
- Batted: Left Threw: Right

Professional debut
- MLB: April 18, 2019, for the New York Yankees
- NPB: July 26, 2024, for the Yokohama DeNA BayStars

Last appearance
- MLB: May 28, 2024, for the Cincinnati Reds
- NPB: October 1, 2025, for the Yokohama DeNA BayStars

MLB statistics
- Batting average: .205
- Home runs: 37
- Runs batted in: 89

NPB statistics
- Batting average: .197
- Home runs: 1
- Runs batted in: 3
- Stats at Baseball Reference

Teams
- New York Yankees (2019–2021); San Francisco Giants (2022); Seattle Mariners (2022); Atlanta Braves (2022); Los Angeles Angels (2022); Seattle Mariners (2023); Cincinnati Reds (2024); Yokohama DeNA BayStars (2024–2025)

Career highlights and awards
- NPB: Japan Series champion (2024)

Michael Harrison Ford (born July 4, 1992) is an American former professional baseball first baseman and designated hitter. He played in Major League Baseball (MLB) for the New York Yankees, San Francisco Giants, Seattle Mariners, Atlanta Braves, Los Angeles Angels, and Cincinnati Reds, and in Nippon Professional Baseball (NPB) for the Yokohama DeNA BayStars.

Ford signed with the Yankees as an undrafted free agent out of Princeton University. He made his MLB debut for the Yankees in 2019 and played for them through 2021. He played for the Giants, Mariners, Braves, and Angels in 2022 and for the Mariners in 2023.

== Early life and college ==
Ford was born on July 4, 1992, to Bob and Barb Ford, and grew up in Belle Mead in Montgomery Township, New Jersey. He is of Irish and Italian descent, respectively. When he was 12 and 13, he was part of Montgomery's Babe Ruth League teams that went to the Cal Ripken and Babe Ruth World Series. He attended Montgomery High School as a freshman before transferring to the Hun School of Princeton.

Ford played college baseball at Princeton University for the Tigers from 2011 to 2013. He was both a first baseman and a pitcher. In 2013, he became the first player in Ivy League history to be named both the Player and Pitcher of the Year, after batting .320 and ranking in the top 10 in the Ivy League in walks (#1, with 31), home runs (#2, with 6), RBIs (#3, with 38), and on-base percentage (#4, at .443), while going 6–0 on the mound with a league-leading 0.98 ERA. In 2011 he played collegiate summer baseball with the Danbury Westerners of the New England Collegiate Baseball League, and then in 2012 and 2013 he played for the Cotuit Kettleers of the Cape Cod Baseball League.

== Professional career ==
=== New York Yankees (2012–2021) ===
After going undrafted in the 2012 Major League Baseball draft, Ford signed with the Yankees as an undrafted free agent. He made his professional debut in 2013 with the Staten Island Yankees and spent the whole season there, batting .235/.346/.374 with three home runs and 17 RBI in 33 games. Ford started 2014 with the Charleston RiverDogs. In May, he hit four home runs in one game against the Hickory Crawdads. He was promoted to the Tampa Yankees of the High-A Florida State League in August and he finished the season there. In 105 total games between both teams he batted .292/.383/.458 with 13 home runs and 56 RBI. He was named a South Atlantic League Mid-Season All Star.

In 2015, Ford played for Tampa where he batted .260/.346/.368 with 62 runs (10th in the league), six home runs, 55 RBI, and 60 walks (4th) in 123 games. He was named a Florida State League Mid-Season All Star. In 2016, he played with Staten Island, Tampa, and the Trenton Thunder of the Double-A Eastern League, where he slashed .289/.411/.479 with eight home runs, 43 RBI, and 41 walks (while striking out only 29 times) in 56 games between the three teams.

The Mariners selected Ford from the Yankees in the 2017 Rule 5 draft. They returned him to the Yankees on March 24. He spent 2017 with Trenton and the Scranton/Wilkes-Barre RailRiders of the Triple-A International League. He led the Eastern League with 76 walks (while striking out only 56 times) and was second in the league in OBP as he batted a combined .270/.404/.471 with 20 home runs and 86 RBI in 126 games. He was named an MiLB Yankees Organization All Star, and an Eastern League Mid-Season All Star. He spent almost all of 2018 with Scranton, batting .253/.327/.433 with 15 home runs and 52 RBI in 102 games. In total, Ford has a .269 average with 71 home runs and 328 RBI in 561 Minor League games.

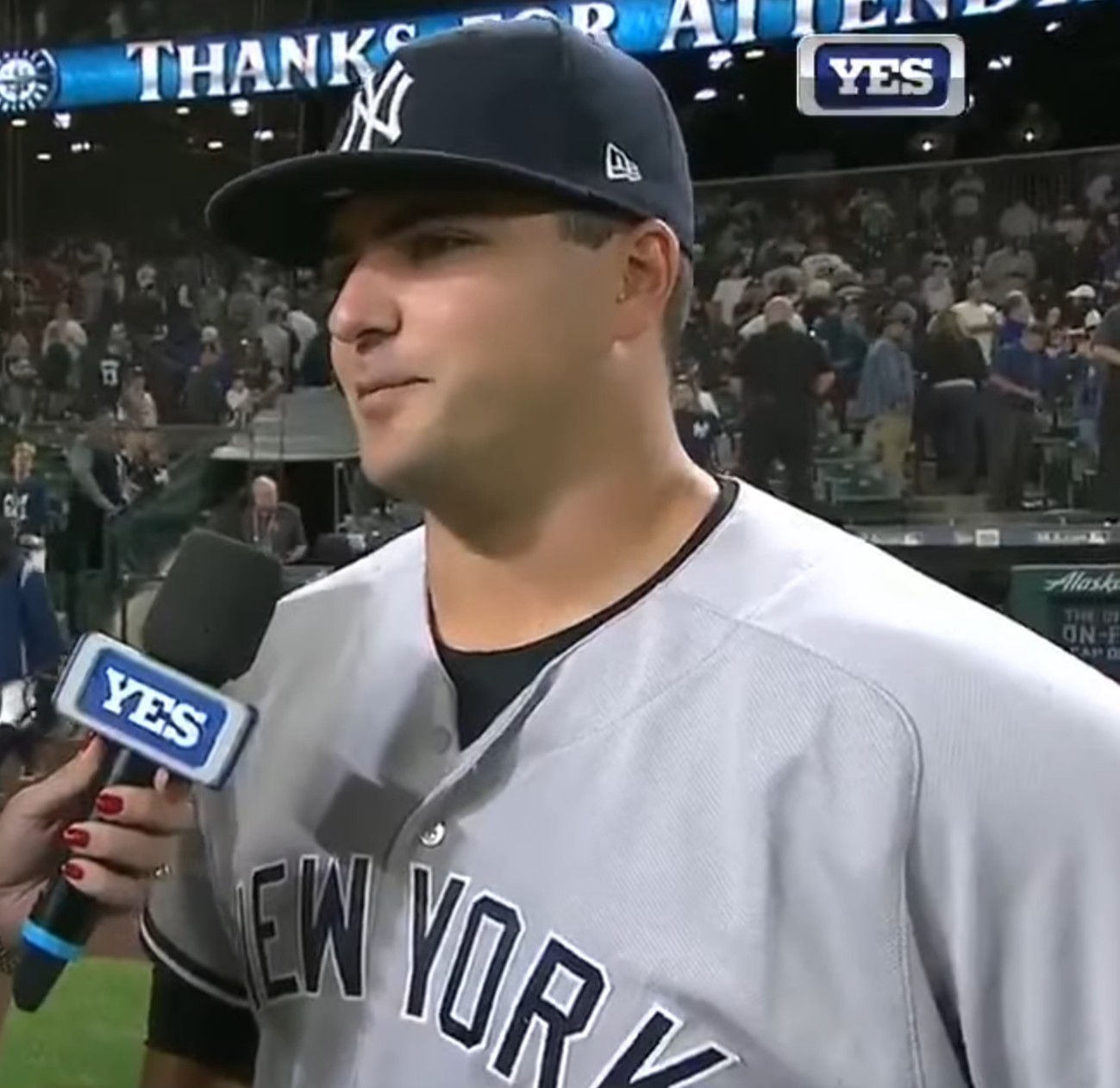
Ford with the New York Yankees in 2019

The Yankees invited Ford to spring training as a non-roster player in 2019. They assigned him to Scranton/Wilkes-Barre to start the 2019 season. The Yankees promoted Ford to the major leagues when Greg Bird went on the injured list on April 16. He made his major league debut on April 18. After going 0 for 6 at bat in his first two games, on April 21, Ford got his first MLB hit; a double to left-center field off Jorge López in a 7–6 win against the Kansas City Royals. On April 23, he hit his first MLB home run off Chris Stratton of the Los Angeles Angels.

On August 15, in a blowout game against the Cleveland Indians, Ford made his pitching debut. He gave up two home runs, but pitched two innings, including a 1-2-3 ninth inning. On August 26, Ford recorded his first multi home run game in his MLB career by hitting two home runs against the Seattle Mariners. On September 1, Ford hit his first career walk-off hit, a solo home run off of Liam Hendriks in a 5–4 win over the Oakland Athletics. Ford finished the 2019 season with 12 home runs in only 143 at-bats along with a solid .350 on-base percentage.

Ford spent the entire 2020 season with the Yankees, but he struggled offensively, posting offensive numbers well below his 2019 season, with a .135/.226/.270 slash line paired with only 2 home runs and 11 RBI. After posting a slash line of .133/.278/.283 in 22 games, Ford was designated for assignment by the Yankees on June 12, 2021.

=== Tampa Bay Rays (2021) ===
On June 17, 2021, Ford was traded to the Tampa Bay Rays for a player to be named later or cash considerations, which was later announced to be outfielder Aldenis Sanchez, and was assigned to the Triple-A Durham Bulls. On August 21, Ford was designated for assignment by the Rays.

=== Washington Nationals (2021) ===
The Washington Nationals claimed Ford off outright waivers from the Rays on August 23, 2021. He was assigned to the Triple-A Rochester Red Wings. On November 30, Ford was non-tendered by the Nationals, making him a free agent.

=== Seattle Mariners (2022) ===
On March 15, 2022, Ford signed a minor league contract with the Seattle Mariners. He batted .317 in 10 games for the Tacoma Rainiers of the Triple-A Pacific Coast League (PCL). On April 19, 2022, Ford had his contract selected to the major league roster. He was designated for assignment on April 25, without having played for the Mariners.

=== San Francisco Giants (2022) ===
On April 30, 2022, the Mariners traded Ford to the San Francisco Giants for cash considerations. He played in one game for the Giants, on May 1, going 1-for-4 with two RBIs. He was demoted to the Triple-A Sacramento River Cats of the PCL, batting 0-for-7 there. On May 11, Ford was designated for assignment by San Francisco following the acquisition of Donovan Walton.

=== Seattle Mariners (second stint) (2022) ===
On May 12, 2022, the Giants traded Ford back to the Mariners. He batted .179 in 37 plate appearances as a designated hitter and pinch hitter. On June 4, Ford was designated for assignment by the Mariners.

=== Atlanta Braves (2022) ===
On June 10, 2022, the Atlanta Braves claimed Ford off waivers from the Mariners and optioned him to the Gwinnett Stripers of the International League. He was recalled to the majors on June 20. On June 30, during a game against the Philadelphia Phillies, Ford, who has some pitching experience in his Princeton University days, pitched his second MLB game (the first being with the Yankees in 2019) when the Braves gave up 2 runs in the series finale. Ford became the first position player since Charlie Culberson to take the mound for the Braves. He was optioned back to Gwinnett on July 4. Ford was recalled again on July 8. He was optioned back to Gwinnett on July 11 without making an appearance. On August 10, Ford was designated for assignment and released.

=== Los Angeles Angels (2022) ===
On August 16, 2022, Ford signed a minor league contract with the Los Angeles Angels. He played for the Salt Lake Bees of the PCL and was promoted to the major leagues on August 25. On September 28, Ford was designated for assignment. He cleared waivers and was sent outright to Triple-A Salt Lake on October 2. Ford elected free agency on October 7.

=== Seattle Mariners (third stint) (2023) ===
On January 13, 2023, Ford signed a minor league contract with the Seattle Mariners organization. He began the season with the Triple-A Tacoma Rainiers. He played in 49 games for Tacoma, hitting .302/.427/.605 with 13 home runs and 56 RBI before he exercised the opt-out clause in his contract on June 1. The following day, Ford was selected to Seattle's active roster. He had the most playing time of his MLB career after rejoining the Mariners, whose DH position through mid-June was posting an OPS of just .580 (lowest in the AL by over .100 points) to go alongside an MLB-worst .160 batting average. In 83 games for Seattle, Ford batted .228/.323/.475 with career-highs in home runs (16) and RBI (34). On November 14, he was designated for assignment after multiple prospects were added to the roster.

=== Cincinnati Reds (2024) ===
On February 23, 2024, Ford agreed to a minor league contract with the Cincinnati Reds. He was granted his release by the Reds on March 22, when it was announced he would not make the Opening Day roster. On March 28, Ford re-signed with the Reds on a new minor league contract. In 24 games for the Triple-A Louisville Bats, he hit .297/.381/.539 with six home runs and 15 RBIs. On May 4, Ford triggered the opt-out clause in his contract and Cincinnati released him. On May 8, Ford re-signed with the Reds on a major league contract. In 17 games for Cincinnati, he batted .150/.177/.233 with one home run and four RBI. Ford was designated for assignment by the team on May 29. Two days later, he refused an outright assignment to Louisville and elected free agency.

=== Yokohama DeNA BayStars (2024) ===
On July 4, 2024, Ford signed with the Yokohama DeNA BayStars of Nippon Professional Baseball. He played in 6 games for the BayStars, going 4-for-20 (.200) with 1 home run and 2 RBI. On December 2, Yokohama announced that Ford would not be returning in 2025, making him a free agent.

=== Minnesota Twins (2025) ===
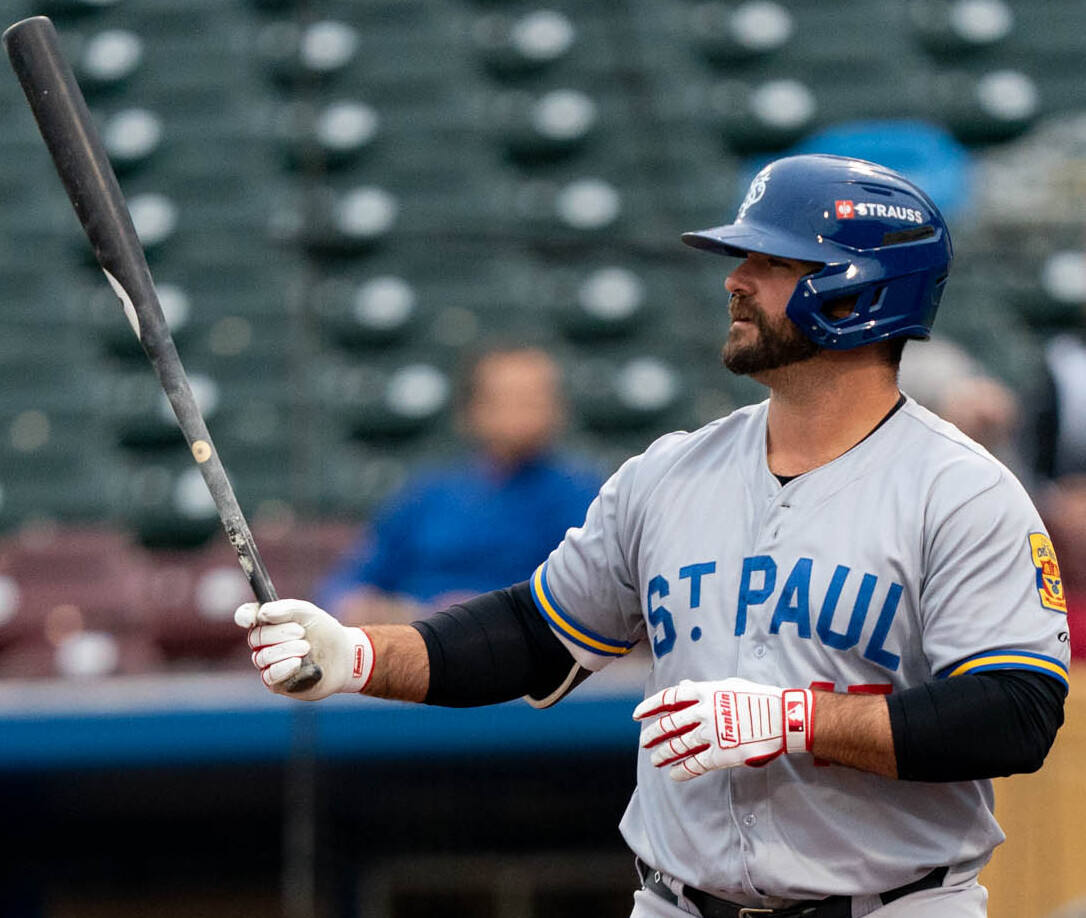
Ford with the St. Paul Saints in 2025

On January 2, 2025, Ford signed a minor league contract with the Minnesota Twins. In 49 appearances for the Triple-A St. Paul Saints, he batted .239/.351/.436 with eight home runs and 27 RBI. Ford was released by the Twins organization on June 2.

=== Yokohama DeNA BayStars (second stint) (2025) ===
On June 21, 2025, Ford re-signed with the Yokohama DeNA BayStars of Nippon Professional Baseball. He made 25 appearances for the BayStars during the remainder of the year, batting .196/.275/.217 with one RBI and five walks. Ford became a free agent following the season.

== Post-playing career ==
On April 10, 2026, the Tampa Bay Rays hired Ford to serve in a role within the team's front office.
