= Adonis Rosa =

Dominican baseball player (born 1994)

Free agent
- Pitcher
- Born: November 17, 1994 (age 32); Santiago, Dominican Republic
- Bats: Right Throws: Right

MLB debut
- August 13, 2019, for the New York Yankees

MLB statistics (through 2019 season)
- Win–loss record: 0–0
- Earned run average: 4.50
- Strikeouts: 2
- Stats at Baseball Reference

Teams
- New York Yankees (2019)

Adonis Enmanuel Rosa (born November 17, 1994) is a Dominican professional baseball pitcher who is a free agent. He has played in Major League Baseball (MLB) for the New York Yankees.

== Career ==
=== New York Yankees ===
Rosa signed with the New York Yankees as an international free agent on December 19, 2013. He made his professional debut in 2014 with the Dominican Summer League Yankees, going 1–0 with a 1.62 ERA and 31 strikeouts in 39 innings. Rosa spent the 2015 season with the rookie-level Pulaski Yankees, going 7–2 with a 3.93 ERA and 42 strikeouts in 55 innings. His 2016 season was split between the Low-A Staten Island Yankees and Single-A Charleston RiverDogs, combining to go 4–6 with a 2.19 ERA and 73 strikeouts in 78 innings of work.

Rosa split the 2017 season between Charleston, the High-A Tampa Yankees, and Triple-A Scranton/Wilkes-Barre RailRiders, going a combined 8–3 with a 3.06 ERA and 102 strikeouts across 111 2/3 innings pitched. His 2018 season was split between Tampa, the Double-A Trenton Thunder, and Scranton/Wilkes-Barre, going a combined 14–6 with a 3.93 ERA and 108 strikeouts in 127 innings. In 2019, Rosa split the season between Trenton and Scranton/Wilkes-Barre.

On August 13, 2019, Rosa was selected to the 40-man roster and promoted to the major leagues for the first time. He made his major league debut that night against the Baltimore Orioles, pitching two innings in relief. Rosa was optioned back to Triple-A Scranton/Wilkes-Barre the following day. Rosa was designated for assignment and sent outright to Triple-A on September 13.

Rosa did not play in a game in 2020 due to the cancellation of the minor league season because of the COVID-19 pandemic. Rosa was released by the Yankees organization on September 5, 2020.

=== Olmecas de Tabasco ===
On July 15, 2021, Rosa signed with the Olmecas de Tabasco of the Mexican League. In three appearances for Tabasco, he posted an 0–1 record with a 13.50 ERA and four strikeouts over six innings pitched. Rosa was released the Olmecas on August 5.

=== Washington Wild Things ===
On February 17, 2022, Rosa signed with the Washington Wild Things of the Frontier League. On December 5, Rosa was released by the Wild Things by having his contract option declined, without having appeared for the club.
