= Joe Harvey (baseball) =

American baseball player (born 1992)

- Pitcher
- Born: January 9, 1992 (age 34); Audubon, Pennsylvania, U.S.
- Batted: Right Threw: Right

MLB debut
- April 10, 2019, for the New York Yankees

Last MLB appearance
- August 20, 2020, for the Colorado Rockies

MLB statistics
- Win–loss record: 1–0
- Earned run average: 4.22
- Strikeouts: 19
- Stats at Baseball Reference

Teams
- New York Yankees (2019); Colorado Rockies (2019–2020)

Joseph Robert Harvey (born January 9, 1992) is an American former professional baseball pitcher. He played in Major League Baseball (MLB) for the New York Yankees and the Colorado Rockies.

== Career ==
=== Amateur ===
Harvey attended La Salle College High School and Kennedy-Kenrick Catholic High School. He graduated from Kennedy-Kenrick in 2010, and then enrolled at the University of Pittsburgh, where he played college baseball for the Pittsburgh Panthers. In 2013, he played collegiate summer baseball with the Hyannis Harbor Hawks of the Cape Cod Baseball League. In 2014, his junior year, he went 2–2 with a 2.90 ERA in 15 games (12 starts). After the season, the New York Yankees selected him in the 19th round, with the 572nd overall selection, of the 2014 MLB draft.

=== New York Yankees ===
Harvey signed and made his professional debut in 2014 with the Rookie-level Gulf Coast League Yankees and the Low–A Staten Island Yankees, accumulating a 0–2 win–loss record with a 1.74 earned run average (ERA) in 20 2/3 innings pitched. He spent the 2015 season with the Single–A Charleston RiverDogs, going 1–1 with a 4.24 ERA in 17 innings. His 2016 season was again split between the GCL Yankees and the Staten Island Yankees, accumulating a 0–1 with a 0.84 ERA in 20 innings. In 2017, he played for the High–A Tampa Yankees, going 1–0 with a 1.05 ERA in 25 2/3 innings. He split the 2018 season between the Double–A Trenton Thunder and the Triple–A Scranton/Wilkes-Barre RailRiders, accumulating a 3–2 record with a 1.67 ERA in 59 innings.

On November 20, 2018, the Yankees added Harvey to their 40-man roster to protect him from the Rule 5 draft. He opened the 2019 season back with Scranton/Wilkes-Barre. The Yankees promoted him to the major leagues on April 10, 2019, and he made his MLB debut that day. He recorded three strikeouts over two scoreless innings of relief.

=== Colorado Rockies ===
On July 31, 2019, the Yankees traded Harvey to the Colorado Rockies in exchange for minor leaguer Alfredo Garcia. In 9 appearances for the Rockies, he posted a 5.63 ERA with 6 strikeouts over 8 innings pitched. On December 9, Harvey was designated for assignment by Colorado. He cleared waivers and was sent outright to the Triple–A Albuquerque Isotopes on December 16.

On August 2, 2020, the Rockies selected Harvey's contract, adding him to their active roster. He made 4 scoreless appearances for Colorado, striking out 2 batters in 3 1/3 innings of work. On October 29, Harvey was outrighted off of the 40-man roster. He became a free agent on November 2.

On December 11, 2020, Harvey re-signed with the Rockies organization on a minor league contract. On June 20, 2021, Harvey was selected to the active roster. He was designated for assignment by Colorado on June 22 without making an appearance for the team. He was outrighted to the Triple–A Albuquerque Isotopes on June 25, but elected free agency on June 27.

=== Minnesota Twins ===
On July 2, 2021, Harvey signed a minor league contract with the Minnesota Twins organization and was assigned to the Triple-A St. Paul Saints. Harvey pitched an 18.00 ERA in four games for St. Paul and elected minor league free agency following the season on November 7.

=== Atlanta Braves ===
On February 23, 2023, Harvey signed a minor league contract with the Atlanta Braves organization. In 27 games split between the High–A Rome Braves and Triple–A Gwinnett Stripers, he logged a cumulative 5.13 ERA with 33 strikeouts in 33 1/3 innings pitched. Harvey was released by the Braves on July 20.
