= Brady Lail =

American baseball player (born 1993)

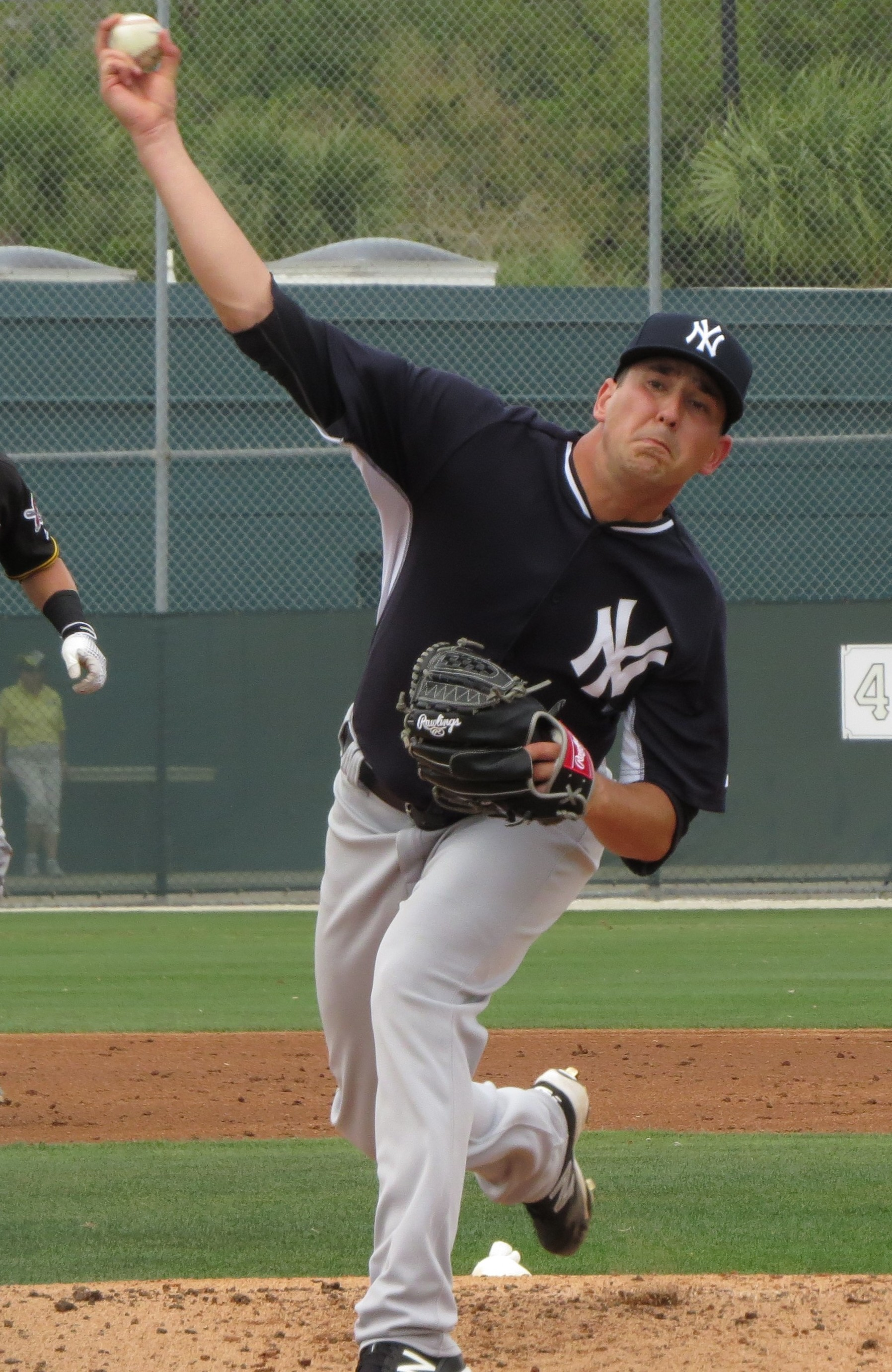
- Lail with the New York Yankees
- Pitcher
- Born: August 9, 1993 (age 33); South Jordan, Utah, U.S.
- Batted: Right Threw: Right

MLB debut
- August 12, 2019, for the New York Yankees

Last MLB appearance
- May 18, 2021, for the Seattle Mariners

MLB statistics
- Win–loss record: 0–0
- Earned run average: 6.00
- Strikeouts: 15
- Stats at Baseball Reference

Teams
- New York Yankees (2019); Chicago White Sox (2020); Seattle Mariners (2020–2021)

Brady Joe Lail (born August 9, 1993) is an American former professional baseball pitcher. He played in Major League Baseball (MLB) for the New York Yankees, Chicago White Sox, and Seattle Mariners. He is currently the pitching development coach for the Jersey Shore BlueClaws in the Philadelphia Phillies organization.

== Playing career ==
=== New York Yankees ===
Lail was drafted by the New York Yankees in the 18th round of the 2012 Major League Baseball draft out of Bingham High School in South Jordan, Utah. He signed with the Yankees and made his professional debut that season with the Gulf Coast Yankees where he was 1–0 with a 1.42 ERA in 12 2/3 innings pitched. He spent 2013 with the Gulf Coast Yankees and Tampa Yankees where he compiled a combined 5–1 record and 2.92 ERA in 14 games (12 starts) between the two teams, and 2014 with the Tampa and the Charleston RiverDogs where he was 11–5 with a 3.62 ERA in 25 total games (24 starts) between both clubs. He was a Mid-Season All-Star with the RiverDogs.

In 2015, he played for Tampa, the Trenton Thunder, and the Scranton/Wilkes-Barre RailRiders where he was 10–6 with a 2.91 ERA in 28 games (27 starts). He was a Mid-Season All-Star with the Tampa Yankees. In 2016, he again pitched with Trenton and Scranton/Wilkes-Barre, posting an 8–8 record and 4.62 ERA in 24 starts. Lail spent 2017 with Trenton and Scranton/Wilkes-Barre where he pitched to a 7–5 record and 4.90 ERA in 28 games (24 starts). He began 2018 with the RailRiders.

The Yankees invited Lail to spring training as a non-roster player in 2019. On August 11, 2019, the Yankees selected Lail's contract and promoted him to the major leagues for the first time. He made his debut on August 12, allowing three runs over 2 2/3 innings pitched. He was optioned back to Triple-A Scranton/Wilkes-Barre the following day. On August 14, Lail was designated for assignment. He elected free agency following the season on November 4.

=== Chicago White Sox ===
On November 27, 2019, Lail signed a minor league deal with the Chicago White Sox with an invite to spring training. On August 4, 2020, Lail had his contract selected to the 40-man roster. He was designated for assignment on August 8.

=== Seattle Mariners ===
On August 10, 2020, Lail was claimed off waivers by the Seattle Mariners. After 7 games with the Mariners, where he posted a 4.80 ERA, he was outrighted to Triple-A Tacoma. On October 19, it was announced that he elected free agency. On November 5, 2020, Lail re-signed a minor league deal with the Mariners. He was selected to the active roster on May 17, 2021. Lail recorded a 13.50 ERA in 2 appearances before being designated for assignment on May 20.

=== Philadelphia Phillies ===
On May 23, 2021, Lail was claimed off waivers by the Philadelphia Phillies. On June 10, Lail was outrighted off of the 40-man roster and assigned to the Triple-A Lehigh Valley IronPigs without having appeared in a game for the Phillies. Lail made 13 appearances with Lehigh Valley, going 1–0 with a 6.08 ERA and 43 strikeouts. On October 13, Lail elected free agency.

=== High Point Rockers ===
On April 21, 2022, Lail signed with the High Point Rockers of the Atlantic League of Professional Baseball. Two strong starts earned him ALPB Pitcher of the Month for the month of April. In total, he made 3 starts for the Rockers, compiling a 2–1 record and 0.95 ERA with 19 strikeouts across 19 innings pitched.

=== Toronto Blue Jays ===
On May 9, 2022, Lail signed a minor league contract with the Toronto Blue Jays organization. He played in 16 games split between the rookie-level Florida Complex League Blue Jays, Single-A Dunedin Blue Jays, and Double-A New Hampshire Fisher Cats, struggling with a 1–3 record, 7.00 ERA, and 38 strikeouts in 36.0 innings pitched. Lail elected free agency following the season on November 10.

== Coaching career ==
On January 31, 2023, Lail was hired by the Philadelphia Phillies organization to serve as the pitching development coordinator their High-A affiliate, the Jersey Shore BlueClaws.
