= Greg Bird (baseball) =

American baseball player (born 1992)

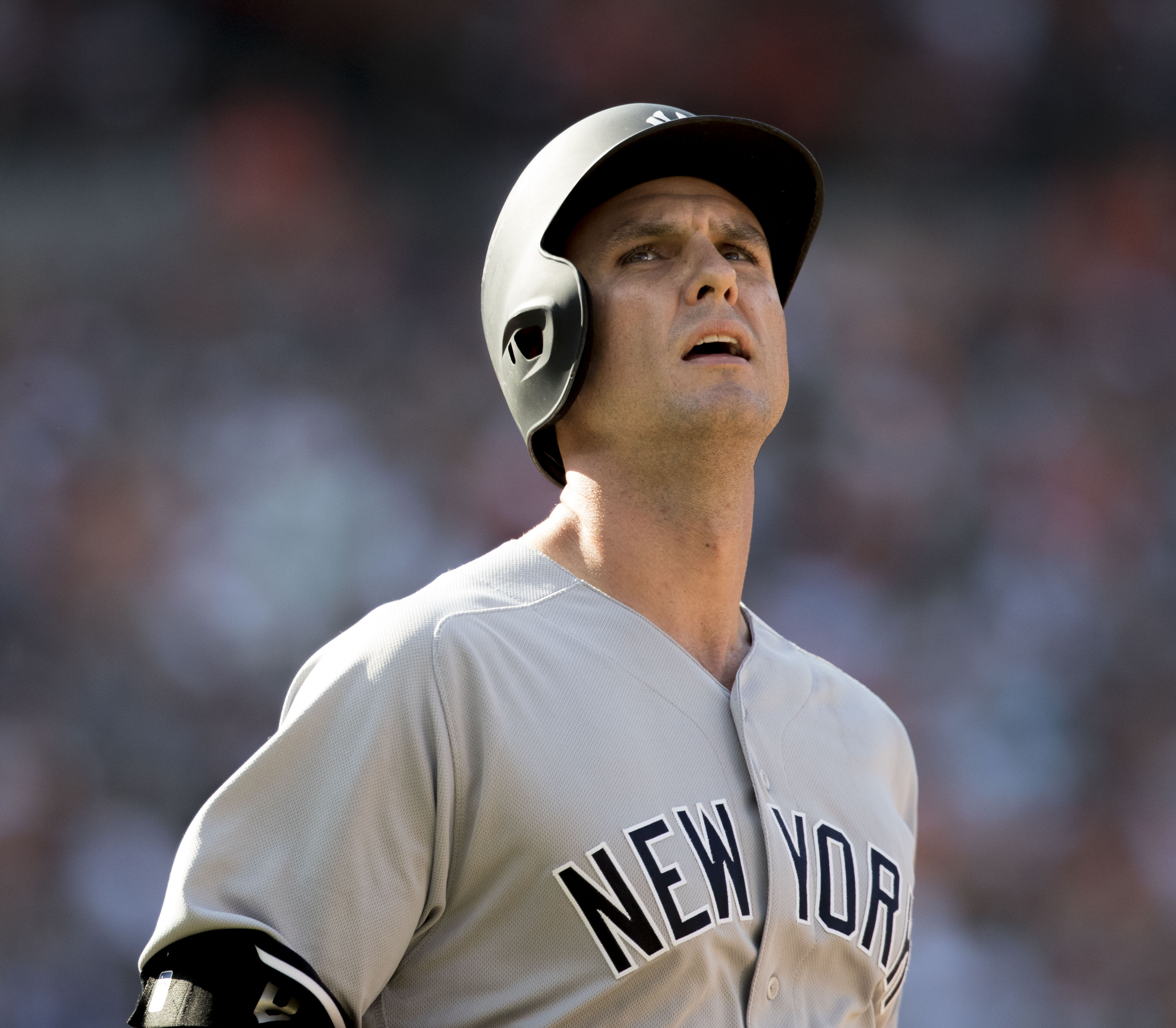
- Bird with the New York Yankees in 2017
- First baseman
- Born: November 9, 1992 (age 33); Memphis, Tennessee, U.S.
- Batted: Left Threw: Right

MLB debut
- August 13, 2015, for the New York Yankees

Last MLB appearance
- April 13, 2019, for the New York Yankees

MLB statistics
- Batting average: .211
- Home runs: 32
- Run batted in: 98
- Stats at Baseball Reference

Teams
- New York Yankees (2015, 2017–2019)

Gregory Paul Bird (born November 9, 1992) is an American former professional baseball first baseman. He played in Major League Baseball (MLB) for the New York Yankees.

Since Bird’s 2015 debut season, his career was plagued by a variety of injuries. Bird missed the entire 2016 campaign and played a mere 173 games with the Yankees and their respective minor league affiliates, between 2017 and 2019.

== Amateur career ==
Bird attended Grandview High School in Aurora, Colorado, where he played for the baseball team as a catcher and formed a battery with pitcher Kevin Gausman. Bird was named the Colorado Gatorade Baseball Player of the Year as a senior. He committed to attend the University of Arkansas to play college baseball for the Arkansas Razorbacks.

== Professional career ==
=== New York Yankees ===
Bird was drafted by the New York Yankees in the fifth round of the 2011 Major League Baseball draft. Bird signed with the Yankees, receiving a $1.1 million signing bonus and bypassing his commitment to Arkansas. He was drafted as a catcher but was moved to first base.

Bird made his professional debut for the Gulf Coast Yankees in 2011. He finished the season playing in four games, going 1 for 12. In 2012, he played in only 28 games due to injuries. He finished the season hitting .337/.450/.494 with two home runs. Bird started the 2013 season with the Charleston RiverDogs of the Single–A South Atlantic League. He finished the season, hitting .288/.428/.511 with 20 home runs and a minor league leading 107 walks. He won the Kevin Lawn Award as the Yankees Minor League Player of the Year.

In 2014, Bird began the season with the Tampa Yankees of the High–A Florida State League, where he batted .277 with seven home runs and 32 runs batted in before he was promoted tor the Trenton Thunder of the Double–A Eastern League, where he batted for a .253/.379/.558 triple slash to go along with seven homers and 11 RBI to create a full season equaling .271/.376/.472 slash line, 14 homers, and 43 RBI in 102 games. After the season, the Yankees assigned Bird to the Scottsdale Scorpions of the Arizona Fall League (AFL). He hit a 450-foot (140 m) home run during the AFL Fall Stars Game. Bird led the AFL with six home runs was named the AFL Most Valuable Player.

Bird started the 2015 season with Double-A Trenton and was promoted to the Scranton/Wilkes-Barre RailRiders of the Triple–A International League during the season. In May, he experienced a shoulder injury.

=== Major leagues ===
==== 2015: Rookie season ====
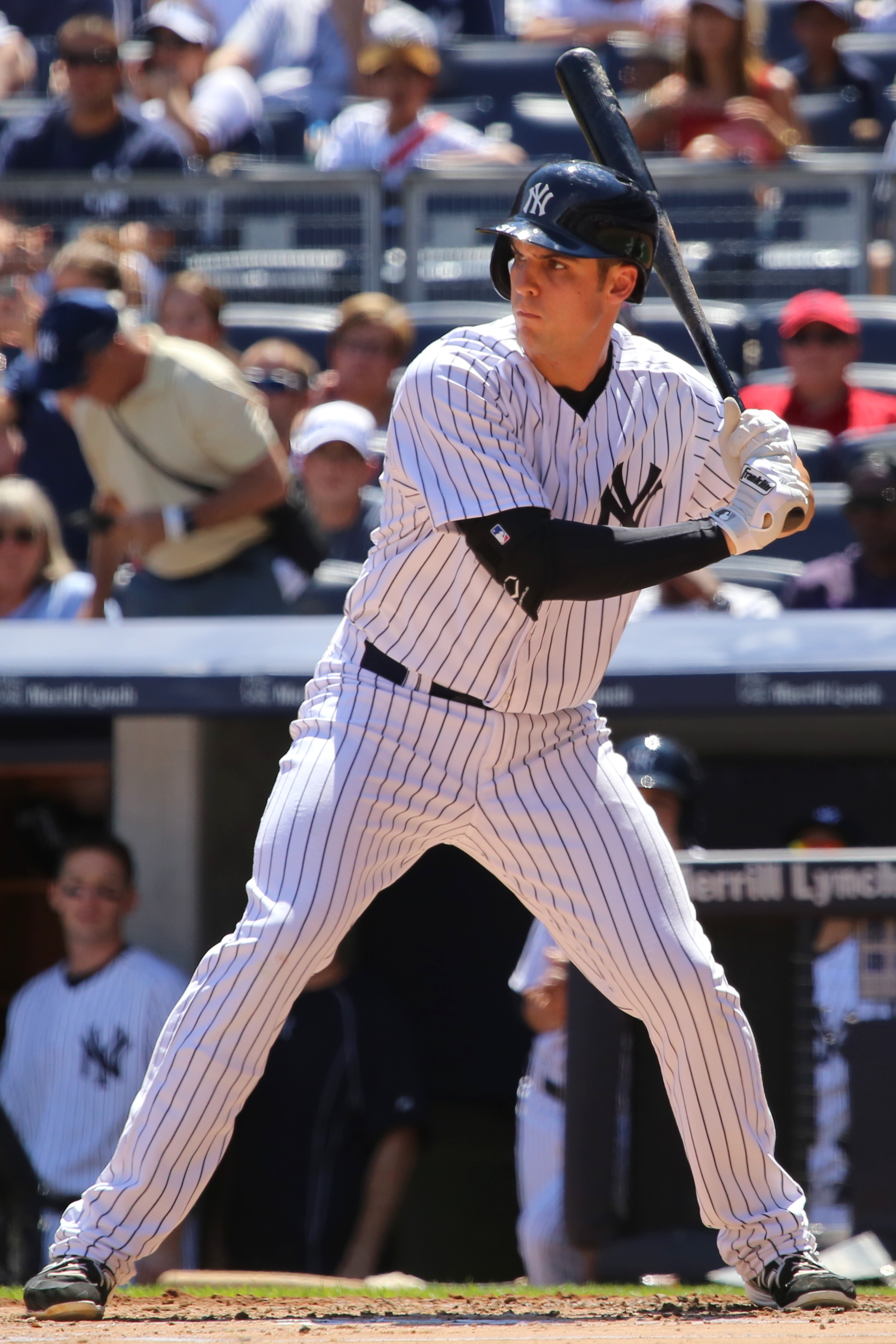
Bird batting for the Yankees in 2015

On August 13, 2015, the Yankees announced that they would promote Bird to the major leagues, serving as a backup to Mark Teixeira at first base and Alex Rodriguez at designated hitter. He made his major league debut that night, going 0-for-5. He collected his first hit on August 15, a single off of Toronto Blue Jays reliever LaTroy Hawkins. Teixeira injured his leg during a hit-by-pitch on August 17, which was later diagnosed as a season-ending shin fracture. As a result, Bird became the Yankees' starting first baseman for the rest of 2015.

On August 19, Bird hit his first two MLB home runs off of Minnesota Twins pitcher Ervin Santana. On September 7, Bird hit a go-ahead three-run home run in a game against the Baltimore Orioles. On September 22, Bird hit a game winning three-run home run against the Toronto Blue Jays in the top of the tenth inning. He finished the season with a .261 batting average and a .343 on-base percentage. In 46 games and 157 at-bats, Bird hit 11 home runs with 31 RBIs.

==== 2016 ====
Bird suffered a recurrence of his right shoulder injury during the 2015-16 offseason, which was diagnosed as a torn labrum. Bird underwent successful surgery, and was ruled out for the entire 2016 MLB season. After not playing during the regular season, Bird recovered from his shoulder injury in time to be assigned to the Scottsdale Scorpions of the Arizona Fall League in October 2016.

==== 2017 ====
In spring training, Bird showed a full recovery from his season-ending shoulder surgery, hitting eight home runs, tied for the most with Washington Nationals outfielder Bryce Harper. He also led the league in extra-base hits (16), on-base percentage (.556), slugging percentage (1.098) and OPS (1.654). During an exhibition game against the Atlanta Braves, Bird hit the first-ever home run in SunTrust Park.

On May 2, Bird was placed on the 10-day disabled list due to a bruised right ankle. His performance was hampered due to an injury he sustained after fouling a ball of his foot at the end of Spring Training, batting .100 in 19 games. In July, Bird was diagnosed with an injury to the os trigonum in his right foot; he would have surgery to remove the bone. On August 26, Bird was activated off the 60-day DL after missing 103 games and went 1-for-2 with two walks in a game that afternoon. Since his return from injury, Bird batted .253 and hit 8 home runs. In 48 games played in 2017, Bird batted .190 with 9 home runs and 28 RBI.

In Game 3 of the ALDS, Bird hit a solo home run off of Cleveland Indians reliever and former Yankee Andrew Miller, only the second home run Miller had allowed on a fastball to a lefty in the last three seasons. It was the only run scored in the game as the Yankees won 1–0. Bird served as the final out in Game 7 of the ALCS against the Houston Astros, flying out to center fielder George Springer to eliminate the Yankees from World Series contention. In the postseason, Bird slashed .244/.426/.512 with three home runs and 6 RBIs; he was also thrown out at home plate twice.

==== 2018 ====
On March 26, 2018, it was revealed that Bird would undergo ankle surgery, ruling him out for six to eight weeks. He underwent successful surgery the next day, and it was revealed to be a small bone spur. A coin-sized calcium deposit was also removed from the ankle. This was the second time Bird had ankle surgery; a different problematic bone was removed from the ankle the previous summer. Bird returned from his ankle surgery on May 26, 2018. Bird struggled in 2018 batting .199/.286/.386 with 11 home runs and 38 RBIs and lost his starting job to Luke Voit late in the season.

==== 2019 ====
On April 16, Bird was placed on the 10-day IL with a left plantar fascia tear, prompting the Yankees to call up first baseman Mike Ford. He was transferred to the 60-day IL on May 12. Bird would go on to miss the rest of the 2019 season. Bird finished the season hitting .171 in 35 at bats.

On November 20, 2019, the Yankees designated Bird for assignment. He became a free agent on November 27.

=== Texas Rangers ===
On February 4, 2020, Bird signed a minor league deal with the Texas Rangers.

On July 31, 2020, Bird was brought back to MLB once he was recalled by the Texas Rangers. Bird suffered an injury before he could appear in a game, and was designated for assignment on August 11 without ever playing as a Ranger. Bird elected free agency on August 14 after being outrighted to the minors.

=== Philadelphia Phillies ===
On September 15, 2020, Bird signed a minor league contract with the Philadelphia Phillies organization.

=== Colorado Rockies ===
On February 11, 2021, Bird signed a minor league contract with the Colorado Rockies organization that included an invitation to Spring Training.

=== Toronto Blue Jays ===
On March 10, 2022, Bird signed a minor league contract with the Toronto Blue Jays. He was released on April 4 when he exercised an opt-out clause in his contract.

=== New York Yankees (second stint) ===
On April 4, 2022, Bird signed a minor league contract with the New York Yankees. He played for the Triple–A Scranton/Wilkes-Barre RailRiders, hitting .218/.325/.354 with 6 home runs and 22 RBI. On July 13, Bird was released by the Yankees organization.

=== Québec Capitales ===
On August 22, 2023, Bird signed with the Québec Capitales of the Frontier League. In 11 games for Québec, Bird hit .293/.341/.390 with one home run and four RBI.

=== Melbourne Aces ===
On October 17, 2023, Bird signed with the Melbourne Aces of the Australian Baseball League. In 40 games for Melbourne, Bird hit .277/.348/.539 with 40 RBI and eleven home runs, the most in the entire league for the 2023/2024 season.

=== Charros de Jalisco ===
On February 26, 2024, Bird signed with the Charros de Jalisco of the Mexican League. In 72 games for Jalisco, Bird hit .317/.399/.580 with 18 home runs and 51 RBI.

=== Algodoneros de Unión Laguna ===
On July 22, 2024, Bird was traded to the Algodoneros de Unión Laguna of the Mexican League in exchange for Steven Fuentes. He did not appear in a game for Laguna. He became a free agent following the season.

== Personal life ==
Bird was born in Memphis, Tennessee. His family moved to Colorado when he was 10 years old.
