= Poland syndrome =

Malformation of the chest muscle and fingers on one side of the body

- Other names: Poland's syndrome, Poland's syndactyly, Poland sequence, Poland's anomaly, unilateral defect of pectoralis major and syndactyly of the hand
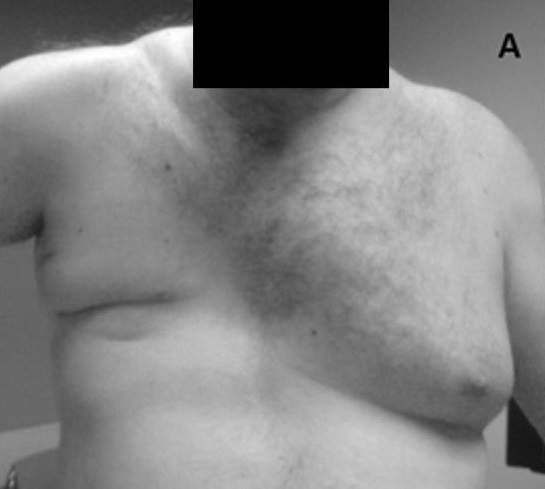
- Missing right breast and right pectoralis major muscle in Poland syndrome
- Specialty: Medical genetics
- Symptoms: Underdeveloped chest muscle and short webbed fingers on one side
- Usual onset: At birth
- Causes: Unknown
- Diagnostic method: Based on symptoms
- Differential diagnosis: Moebius syndrome, Hanhart syndrome
- Treatment: Surgical correction
- Frequency: 1 in 20,000 newborns

Poland syndrome is a birth defect characterized by an underdeveloped chest muscle and/or short webbed fingers on one side of the body. There may also be short ribs, less fat, and breast and nipple abnormalities on the same side of the body. Typically, the right hand side is affected. Those affected generally have normal movement and health.

The cause of Poland syndrome is unknown. One theory is that it is due to disruption of blood flow during embryonic development. It is generally not inherited, and no genes that contribute to the disorder have been identified. Diagnosis of Poland syndrome is based on its symptoms. Often, those with the syndrome remain undiagnosed, and some may not realize they have it until puberty.

Treatment of Poland syndrome depends on its severity and may include surgical correction. The syndrome affects about 1 in 20,000 newborns. Males are affected twice as often as females. It is named after English surgeon Alfred Poland, who described the condition when he was a student in 1841. In many cases, patients with Poland syndrome also present with pectus excavatum, so they need to be evaluated by a professional and undergo minimally invasive chest remodeling to ensure cardiac decompression.

== Signs and symptoms ==
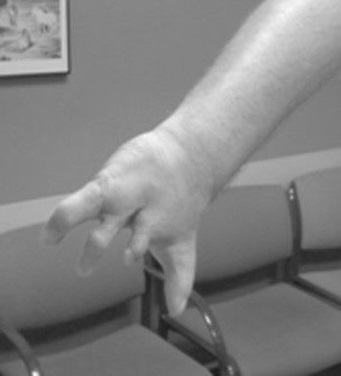
Right hand symbrachydactyly in Poland syndrome

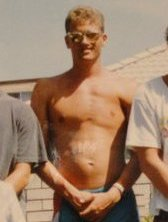
Male with Poland syndrome showing absent left pectoral

A list of the common side effects broken down by frequency.

=== Very frequent ===
- Abnormal gastrointestinal tract
- Absent breast tissue
- Absent pectoral muscles
- Brachydactyly (Short fingers)
- Dextrocardia
- Diaphragmatic hernia/defect
- Humerus absent/abnormal
- Liver/biliary tract anomalies
- Maternal diabetes
- Oligodactyly/missing fingers
- Radius absent/abnormal
- Rhizomelic micromelia (relatively shorter proximal segment of the limbs compared to the middle and the distal segments)
- Sparsity or abnormality of axillary hair on affected side
- Syndactyly of fingers (webbing)
- Ulna absent/abnormal
- Upper limb asymmetry
- Abnormal rib
- Simian crease on affected side

=== Frequent ===
- Hypoplastic/absent nipples
- Scapula anomaly

=== Occasional ===
- Agenesis/hypoplasia of kidneys
- Encephalocele/exencephaly
- Abnormal morphology of hypothalamic-hypophyseal axis
- Abnormal function of hypothalamic-hypophyseal axis
- Microcephaly
- Preaxial polydactyly
- Ureteric anomalies (reflux/duplex system)
- Vertebral segmentation anomaly

It is usually considered a unilateral condition. Some have claimed that the term can be applied in bilateral presentation, but others recommend using alternate terminology in those cases.

== Causes ==
The cause of Poland syndrome is unknown. However, an interruption of the embryonic blood supply to the arteries that lie under the collarbone (subclavian arteries) at about the 46th day of embryonic development is the prevailing theory.

The subclavian arteries normally supply blood to embryonic tissues that give rise to the chest wall and hand. Variations in the site and extent of the disruption may explain the range of signs and symptoms that occur in Poland syndrome. Abnormality of an embryonic structure called the apical ectodermal ridge, which helps direct early limb development, may also be involved in this disorder.

== Diagnosis ==
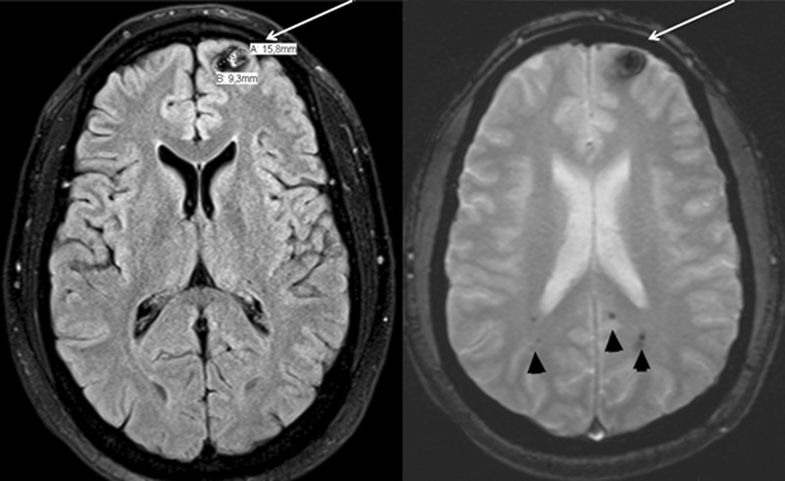
The person's largest cavernous malformation is shown in the left frontal pole. This lesion has classic signs of hemorrhage (white arrows). More lesions compatible with cavernous malformations in other areas of the brain can also be observed (arrowheads). Poland syndrome.

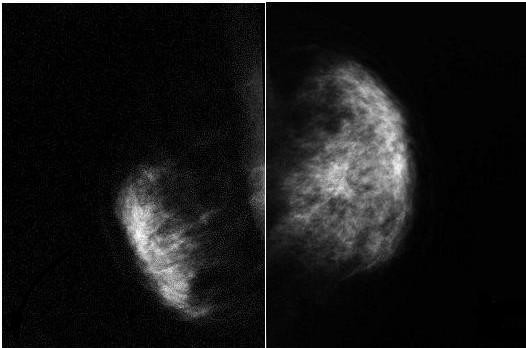
Mammogram showing absence of the pectoralis major muscle and distortion on the left side. Right side is normal.

Poland syndrome is sometimes diagnosed at birth, based upon the physical characteristics. Imaging techniques such as a CT scan may reveal the extent to which the muscles are affected. The syndrome varies in severity and as such is often not reported until puberty, when lopsided growth becomes apparent.

== Treatment ==
=== Technique ===
The complete or partial absence of the pectoralis muscle is the malformation that defines Poland syndrome. It can be treated surgically, by inserting a custom implant designed by CAD (computer aided design). A 3D reconstruction of the patient's chest is done using an implant shaped from a medical scan and designed to be perfectly adapted to the anatomy. The implant is made of medical grade silicone rubber. The treatment is purely cosmetic and does not restore the patient's imbalanced upper body strength.

The Poland syndrome malformations are morphological, so correction by custom implant is the first-line treatment. This technique allows a wide variety of patients to be treated with good outcomes. Poland syndrome can be associated with bones, subcutaneous and mammary atrophy: the first, as for pectus excavatum, is successfully corrected by a custom implant, while the others can require interventions such as lipofilling or silicone breast implant, in a second operation.

=== Surgery ===
The surgery takes place under general anaesthesia and usually lasts less than 1 hour. The surgeon prepares the locus to the size of the implant after performing an 8-centimetre (3.1 in) axillary incision, then inserts the implant beneath the skin.

The implant replaces the pectoralis major muscle, thus enabling the thorax to be symmetrical and, in women, the breast as well. For females affected by Poland syndrome, breast reconstruction is a key aspect of treatment, and latissimus dorsi muscle transfer offers a reconstructive option.

Lipomodelling is progressively used in the correction of breast and chest wall deformities. In Poland syndrome, this technique appears to be a major advance that will probably revolutionize the treatment of severe cases. This is mainly due to its ability to achieve previously unachievable quality of reconstruction with minimal scarring.

For individuals with Poland syndrome, particularly females seeking breast reconstruction to address chest wall and breast hypoplasia, latissimus dorsi muscle transfer is a recognized surgical option. This technique involves surgically moving a portion of the latissimus dorsi muscle from the back to the affected anterior chest wall. Advancements in surgical approaches include videoendoscopic techniques that allow for the harvest and transfer of this muscle through smaller incisions, such as an axillary (armpit) incision. This minimally invasive approach aims to improve the aesthetic contour and symmetry of the chest and breast.

The endoscopic dissection of the muscle is facilitated through a small 2.5-cm axillary incision. To prepare the recipient site, a 5-cm anterior chest wall incision is made to receive the transferred muscle. Additionally, a 1-cm infraclavicular incision provides crucial optic access for the videoendoscopic instruments, allowing surgeons clear visualization during the procedure.

A significant advantage of this endoscopic technique is that it avoids the necessity of the long posterior dorsal incision traditionally required for classic latissimus dorsi muscle transfer. By circumventing the large posterior incision, this technique considerably minimizes scarring.

Furthermore, the less invasive nature of the endoscopic approach is associated with reduced patient discomfort during recovery.

The overall result of this videoendoscopic method is an improved cosmetic outcome for patients undergoing breast reconstruction for Poland syndrome. Initial experience demonstrates its feasibility, with successful application in patients.

The patient can also have pectus excavatum, often called "funnel chest," a chest wall malformation with physical effects. The sternum's inward curve can compress the heart, squeezing it and reducing the space it has in the chest. This physical pressure can hinder how the heart works, especially during exercise. Addressing this mechanical interference by restoring normal chest space is a key reason for surgical correction. Treatment for pectus excavatum has changed over time, moving beyond just cosmetic fixes to focusing on these potential health impacts.

== Epidemiology ==
Poland syndrome affects males three times as often as females and affects the right side of the body twice as often as the left. The sex differential is a piece of evidence that there might be a genetic component to the syndrome, which could be recessive sex-linked. On the other hand, a study from 2016 showed that REV3L, a gene on Chromosome 6, is implicated, and that other "rare CNVs were identified in PS patients, and these involve genes that represent candidates for further evaluation." REV3L in turn interacts with MAD2L2 on Chromosome 1; thus the inheritance pattern is likely to be more complicated than a simple recessive pattern as shown on a basic pedigree chart.

The incidence is estimated to range from one in 7,000 to one in 100,000 live births.

== History ==
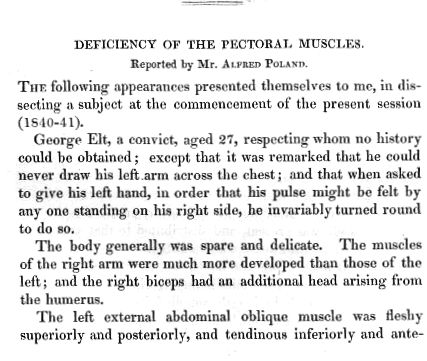
Alfred Poland's original description of the syndrome.

It was named in 1962 by Patrick Clarkson, a New Zealand-born British plastic surgeon working at Guy's Hospital and Queen Mary's Hospital, London. He noticed that three of his patients had both a hand deformity and an underdeveloped breast on the same side. He discussed this with his colleague at Guy's Hospital, Dr Philip Evans, who agreed that the syndrome was "not widely appreciated". Clarkson found a reference to a similar deformity published by Alfred Poland, an English surgeon, over a hundred years earlier in Guy's Hospital reports, in 1841. Clarkson was able to find the hand specimen dissected by Poland, which was still held in the hospital pathology museum.

Poland had dissected a convict known as George Elt, who was said to be unable to draw his hand across his chest. Poland noted the chest wall deformity, and this was illustrated in his article. The hand was also dissected and preserved for posterity in Guy's Hospital museum where it remains today. It cannot be truly said that Poland described this syndrome because he only described one isolated case. Clarkson published his series of three cases and named the syndrome after Poland in his article.

== Notable cases ==
- TV presenter Jeremy Beadle (1948–2008) was known for having this condition. His Poland syndrome manifested itself in the form of his disproportionately small right hand.
- Olympic boxer Jérôme Thomas is also affected by Poland syndrome, as his left arm and hand are significantly shorter and smaller than his right. Thomas also lacks a left pectoral muscle.
- PGA Tour golfer Bryce Molder has Poland syndrome, with an absent left pectoral muscle and a small left hand. Several surgeries in his childhood repaired syndactyly on the left hand.
- Actor Ted Danson, famous for starring in the TV show Cheers, disclosed that he had the condition in 2000 to Orange Coast magazine and said that he was bullied as a child because of it.
- Formula One World Champion Fernando Alonso is affected by Poland syndrome; he is missing the right pectoral muscle.
- Cricketer Lewis Hatchett was born with Poland syndrome.
- Australian Paralympian Mathew Silcocks is affected by Poland syndrome.
- Hailey Dawson of Nevada (born 2010) has a missing right pectoral muscle and is missing three fingers on her right hand due to the condition. She has thrown out the ceremonial first pitch at all 30 Major League Baseball parks, using a 3D-printed robotic right hand fitted for her by engineers at the University of Nevada, Las Vegas.
- Actor Gary Burghoff, best known for the television series M*A*S*H, has Poland syndrome manifesting in brachydactyly on his left hand. It was seldom noticeable throughout the show's run, Burghoff usually putting his hand in his pocket or concealing it under props such as the clipboards carried by his character Radar O'Reilly.
- English singer-songwriter Matt Goss has Poland syndrome, manifesting as a missing lower pectoral on his right side.
- Paralympian and doctor, Dr Kim Daybell is affected by Poland syndrome and plays in class 10 of para table tennis. He has now retired from international para table tennis.
- New Zealand comedian Chris Parker has Poland syndrome and is missing his right pectoral muscle.
