= 2017 World Series =

113th edition of Major League Baseball's championship series

Team (Wins)	Managers	Season
Houston Astros (4)	A. J. Hinch	101–61 (.623), GA: 21
Los Angeles Dodgers (3)	Dave Roberts	104–58 (.642), GA: 11
- Dates: October 24 – November 1
- Venue(s): Dodger Stadium (Los Angeles); Minute Maid Park (Houston)
- MVP: George Springer (Houston)
- Umpires: Phil Cuzzi (Games 1–2), Gerry Davis (crew chief), Laz Díaz, Dan Iassogna, Bill Miller, Paul Nauert, Mark Wegner (Games 3–7)
- Hall of Famers: Astros: Carlos Beltrán; Dodgers: None

Broadcast
- Television: Fox (United States – English); Fox Deportes (United States – Spanish); MLB International (International)
- TV announcers: Joe Buck, John Smoltz, Ken Rosenthal, and Tom Verducci (Fox); Rolando Nichols, Carlos Álvarez, Edgar Gonzalez, and Jaime Motta (Fox Deportes); Matt Vasgersian and Buck Martinez (MLB International)
- Radio: ESPN (English); ESPN Deportes (Spanish); KBME (HOU – English); KODA (HOU – Spanish); KLAC (LAD – English); KTNQ (LAD – Spanish); KMPC (LAD – Korean)
- Radio announcers: Dan Shulman and Aaron Boone (ESPN); Eduardo Ortega, Renato Bermúdez, José Francisco Rivera, and Orlando Hernández (ESPN Deportes); Robert Ford and Steve Sparks (KBME); Alex Treviño and Francisco Romero (KODA); Charley Steiner and Rick Monday (KLAC); Jaime Jarrín and Jorge Jarrín (KTNQ); Richard Choi and Chong Ho Yim (KMPC)
- ALCS: Houston Astros over New York Yankees (4–3)
- NLCS: Los Angeles Dodgers over Chicago Cubs (4–1)

The 2017 World Series was the championship series of Major League Baseball's (MLB) 2017 season. The 113th edition of the World Series, it was a best-of-seven playoff played between the National League (NL) champion Los Angeles Dodgers and the American League (AL) champion Houston Astros. The series was played between October 24 and November 1.

The Astros defeated the Dodgers, four games to three, to win their first World Series in franchise history, also becoming the first team from Texas to do so. They became the second team in postseason history to win two Game 7s in one postseason, after the 1985 Kansas City Royals. It was the first time since 2001–2002 when two consecutive World Series went to seven games. Both teams set a World Series record with a combined total of 25 home runs throughout the entire series, including a team record 15 home runs by the Astros, and 10 homeruns by the Dodgers, and hit a combined total of eight home runs in Game 2 to set the single game World Series mark. Houston outfielder George Springer was named the World Series Most Valuable Player (MVP) after hitting five home runs in the series to tie a World Series record with Reggie Jackson in 1977 and Chase Utley in 2009.

This was the first World Series in which home-field advantage was decided by the regular season record of the two pennant winners. From 1903 to 2002, home-field advantage had been determined by coin flips and by alternating between the AL and NL. (Note: Except 1904 and 1994, when the World Series was not held) From 2003 to 2016, it was determined by results from that season's All-Star Game, when it was awarded to the team from the winning league. The Dodgers earned home-field advantage over the Astros. The series was played in a 2–3–2 format, with the Dodgers hosting Games 1, 2, 6, and 7; and the Astros hosting Games 3, 4, and 5.

The Astros' victory was marred in 2019 after a league investigation revealed that they had illegally utilized a system to steal signs from opposing teams during their championship season. As a result, the Astros were fined $5 million and docked several top draft picks, while Astros manager A. J. Hinch and general manager Jeff Luhnow were suspended for one year; both were subsequently fired. Despite the scandal, MLB Commissioner Rob Manfred opted against punishing any of the players involved or revoking the Astros' World Series title.

== Background ==
This was the first World Series matchup, and second postseason meeting overall, between the Astros and Dodgers. Los Angeles defeated Houston in five games in the 1981 National League Division Series, en route to its fifth World Series championship (and first since 1965). The teams also met in the 1980 National League West tie-breaker game, won by the Astros at Dodger Stadium. This was the first Fall Classic since 1970, and the eighth overall, in which both participants had 100 or more wins during the regular season.

The two teams did not meet in interleague play during the regular season.

=== Los Angeles Dodgers ===
The Dodgers held a 91–36 record through August 25 and ended the season with a 104–58 record; this despite an 11-game losing streak from late August through early September. They won their fifth consecutive National League West title and home-field advantage throughout the entire playoffs as the overall #1 seed. In the postseason, the Dodgers swept the 4th-seeded Arizona Diamondbacks in the National League Division Series and then defeated the number 3 seed and defending World Series champion Chicago Cubs in the previous year's rematch of the National League Championship Series in five games, leading to the fourth time since 2000 that two teams played each other in consecutive League Championship Series. This was the first appearance in the Fall Classic for the Dodgers since 1988, the tenth since the franchise moved from Brooklyn to Los Angeles in 1958, and the 19th overall.

Entering the 2017 World Series, the Dodgers bullpen had thrown 23 consecutive scoreless innings, a postseason record for a bullpen. Additionally, by outscoring the Arizona Diamondbacks and Chicago Cubs by a combined 48–19 margin, the Dodgers entered the World Series with the third-best run differential of any pennant winner since the playoff structure was expanded in 1995.

All-Star shortstop Corey Seager, who was out for the entire National League Championship Series with a back injury, was included on the Dodgers' World Series roster. Manager Dave Roberts became first manager of Asian heritage ever in the World Series, as well as the fourth African-American manager. The Dodgers had their second consecutive Rookie of the Year, Cody Bellinger, after Seager from 2016. The Dodgers had six NL All-Stars in Bellinger, Seager, Justin Turner, Clayton Kershaw, Alex Wood, and Kenley Jansen.

=== Houston Astros ===
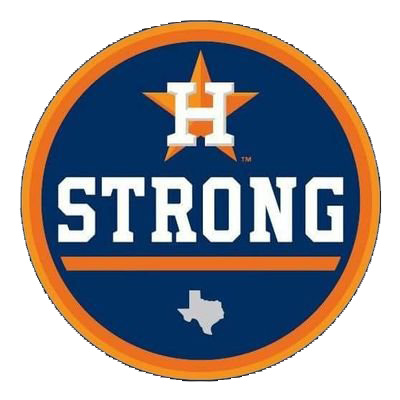
The Astros wore a patch during the 2017 World Series in support of Hurricane Harvey victims in Houston

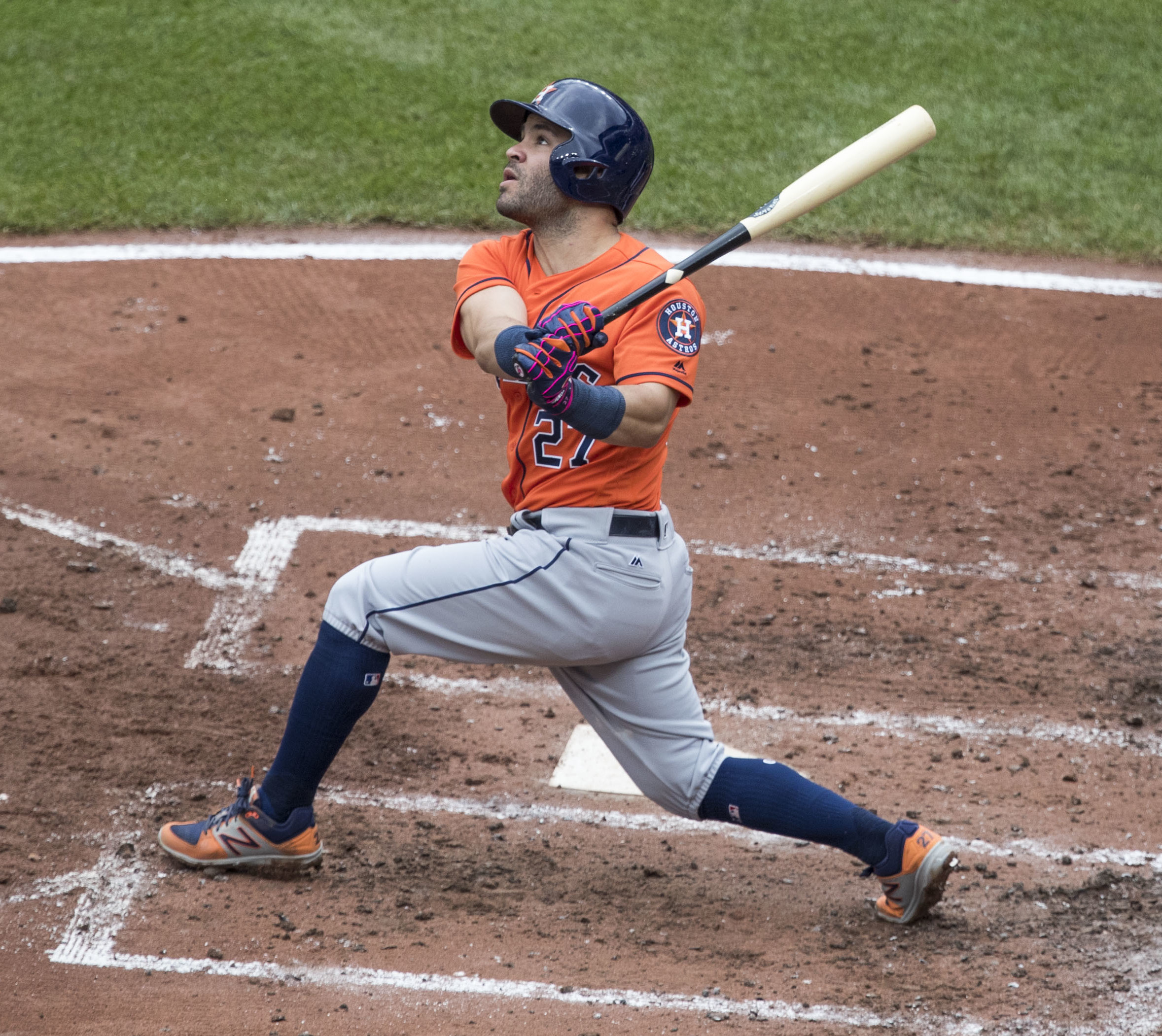
Jose Altuve was named the American League's MVP

With a 101–61 regular season record, the team won its first American League West title, their first division title since 2001, and the #2 seed in the AL. (Note: The Astros moved to the American League West from the National League Central before the 2013 season.) In the American League Division Series, they defeated the 3rd-seeded Boston Red Sox in four games and then defeated the 4th-seeded New York Yankees in the American League Championship Series (ALCS) in seven games. This was their second World Series appearance, first since 2005, when they were swept in four games by the Chicago White Sox and first appearance as a member of the American League (which the team joined in 2013), as they became the first team in history to make it to the World Series as members of both National and American Leagues.

The city of Houston in August 2017 suffered record flooding from Hurricane Harvey. The team began to wear patches which had the logo of the team with the word "Strong" on the bottom of the patch, as well as promoting the hashtag Houston Strong. Manager A. J. Hinch has stated in an interview that the team wasn't just playing for a title, but to help boost moral support for the city.

On August 31, just seconds before the midnight deadline, the Astros traded for Detroit Tigers pitcher Justin Verlander. Following the trade, including the regular season and postseason to this point, Verlander had posted a 9–0 win–loss record with a 1.23 earned run average. He was named the ALCS MVP.

== Summary ==
Houston won the series, 4–3.

Game	Date	Score	Location	Time	Attendance
1	October 24	Houston Astros – 1, Los Angeles Dodgers – 3	Dodger Stadium	2:28	54,253
2	October 25	Houston Astros – 7, Los Angeles Dodgers – 6 (11)	Dodger Stadium	4:19	54,293
3	October 27	Los Angeles Dodgers – 3, Houston Astros – 5	Minute Maid Park	3:46	43,282
4	October 28	Los Angeles Dodgers – 6, Houston Astros – 2	Minute Maid Park	3:06	43,322
5	October 29	Los Angeles Dodgers – 12, Houston Astros – 13 (10)	Minute Maid Park	5:17	43,300
6	October 31	Houston Astros – 1, Los Angeles Dodgers – 3	Dodger Stadium	3:22	54,128
7	November 1	Houston Astros – 5, Los Angeles Dodgers – 1	Dodger Stadium	3:37	54,124

== Pre-game ceremonies ==
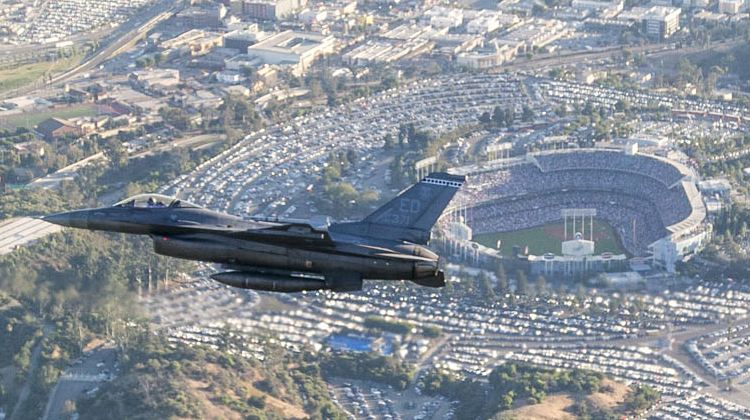
An F-16 Fighting Falcon flies past Dodger Stadium during the pre-game ceremonial flyover before Game 2.

- Game 1: The ceremonial first pitch was thrown out by members of former Dodger Jackie Robinson's family, including his widow Rachel. The game marked the 45th anniversary of Robinson's death, and the 2017 season was the 70th anniversary of his breaking of the baseball color line. Keith Williams Jr., a gospel singer and Dodgers anthem singer, performed "The Star-Spangled Banner", the national anthem.
- Game 2: Fernando Valenzuela threw out the ceremonial first pitch to Steve Yeager; both were introduced by retired Dodgers broadcaster Vin Scully. Country music's Brad Paisley performed the national anthem.
- Game 3: Houston Texans defensive end J. J. Watt, who had raised $37 million for Hurricane Harvey victims, threw out the first pitch. The ball was given to him by Astros' Hall of Famer Craig Biggio. The national anthem was performed by Texas Air National Guard Master Sergeant Promise Harris.
- Game 4: Hailey Dawson, a seven-year-old girl from Nevada, threw out the ceremonial first pitch using a 3D printed hand. The national anthem was performed by the Houston Police Department Quartet.
- Game 5: Former President of the United States George W. Bush threw out the ceremonial first pitch. His father, former President George H. W. Bush handed him the ball. Justin Verlander caught the pitch. Country singer Clay Walker performed the national anthem.
- Game 6: Orel Hershiser and Tommy Lasorda, celebrating the Dodgers' 1988 World Series title, each threw out the ceremonial first pitch. Los Angeles Police Department (LAPD) officer Rosalind Curry performed the national anthem.
- Game 7: The LAPD Quartet sang the National Anthem. The first pitch was thrown out by Sandy Koufax and Don Newcombe. Rick Monday and Steve Garvey participated as well.

== Matchups ==
=== Game 1 ===
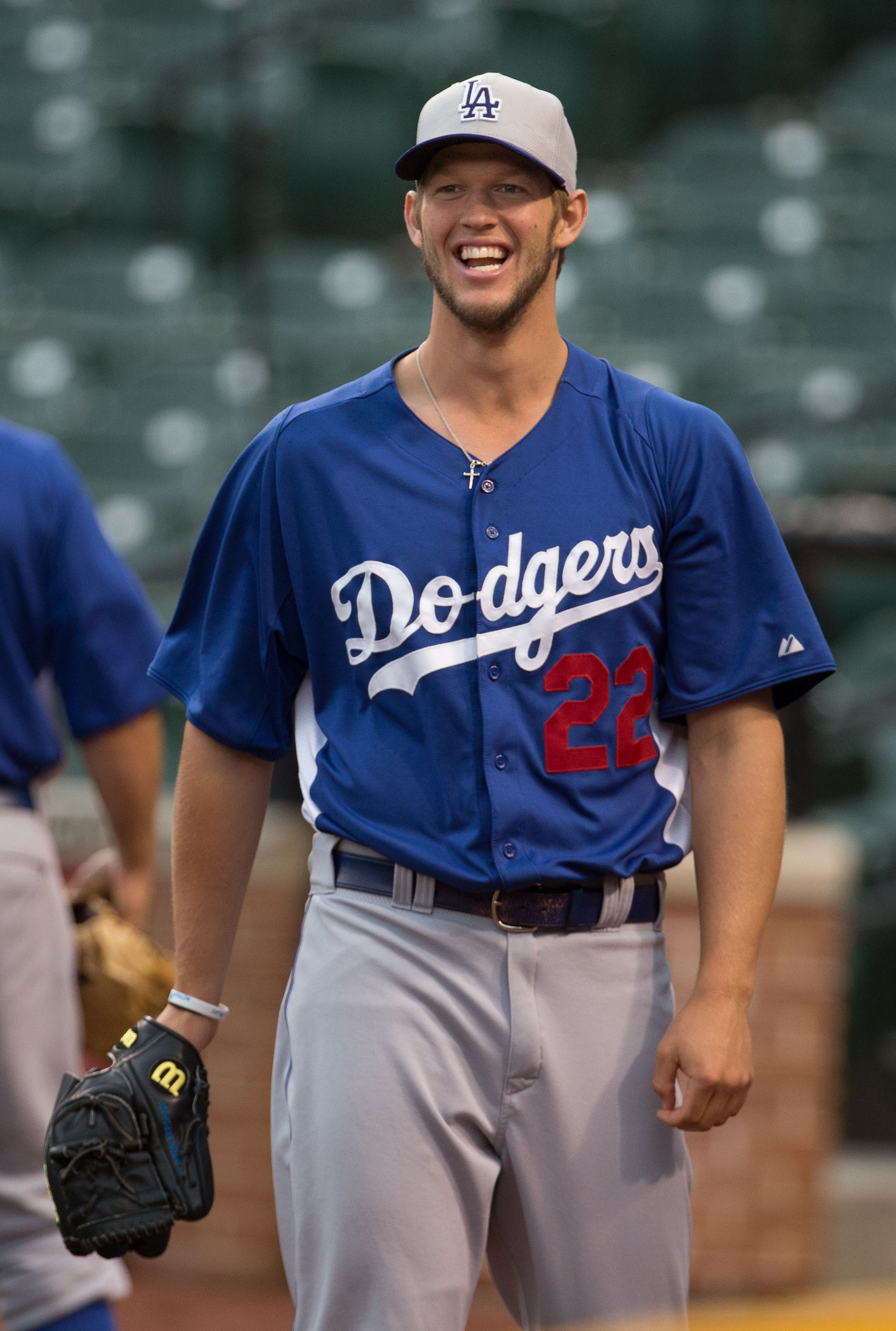
Clayton Kershaw pitched seven innings with 11 strikeouts in winning Game 1.

October 24, 2017 5:11 pm (PDT) at Dodger Stadium in Los Angeles, California, 103 °F (39 °C), clear
Team	1	2	3	4	5	6	7	8	9	R	H	E
Houston	0	0	0	1	0	0	0	0	0	1	3	0
Los Angeles	1	0	0	0	0	2	0	0	X	3	6	0
WP: Clayton Kershaw (1–0) LP: Dallas Keuchel (0–1) Sv: Kenley Jansen (1); Home runs: HOU: Alex Bregman (1); LAD: Chris Taylor (1), Justin Turner (1); Attendance: 54,253; Boxscore

The temperature at the start of the game was 103 °F (39 °C), which made this the hottest World Series game ever recorded. Clayton Kershaw started Game 1 for the Dodgers, while Dallas Keuchel started for the Astros.

Chris Taylor hit a home run for the Dodgers on Keuchel's first pitch of the game. It was the third home run to lead off a game in Dodgers postseason history (following Davey Lopes in 1978 World Series and Carl Crawford in 2013 NLDS). Alex Bregman hit a tying home run for the Astros in the fourth inning. In the sixth inning, Justin Turner hit a go-ahead two-run home run for the Dodgers. Turner tied Duke Snider for most career runs batted in (RBIs) in Dodgers postseason history with 26. Kershaw struck out 11 in seven innings pitched with no walks and only three hits allowed while Keuchel allowed three runs on six hits in 6 2/3 innings. Brandon Morrow pitched a scoreless eighth and Kenley Jansen earned the save. The two-hour, 28-minute game was the shortest World Series contest since Game 4 in 1992.

=== Game 2 ===
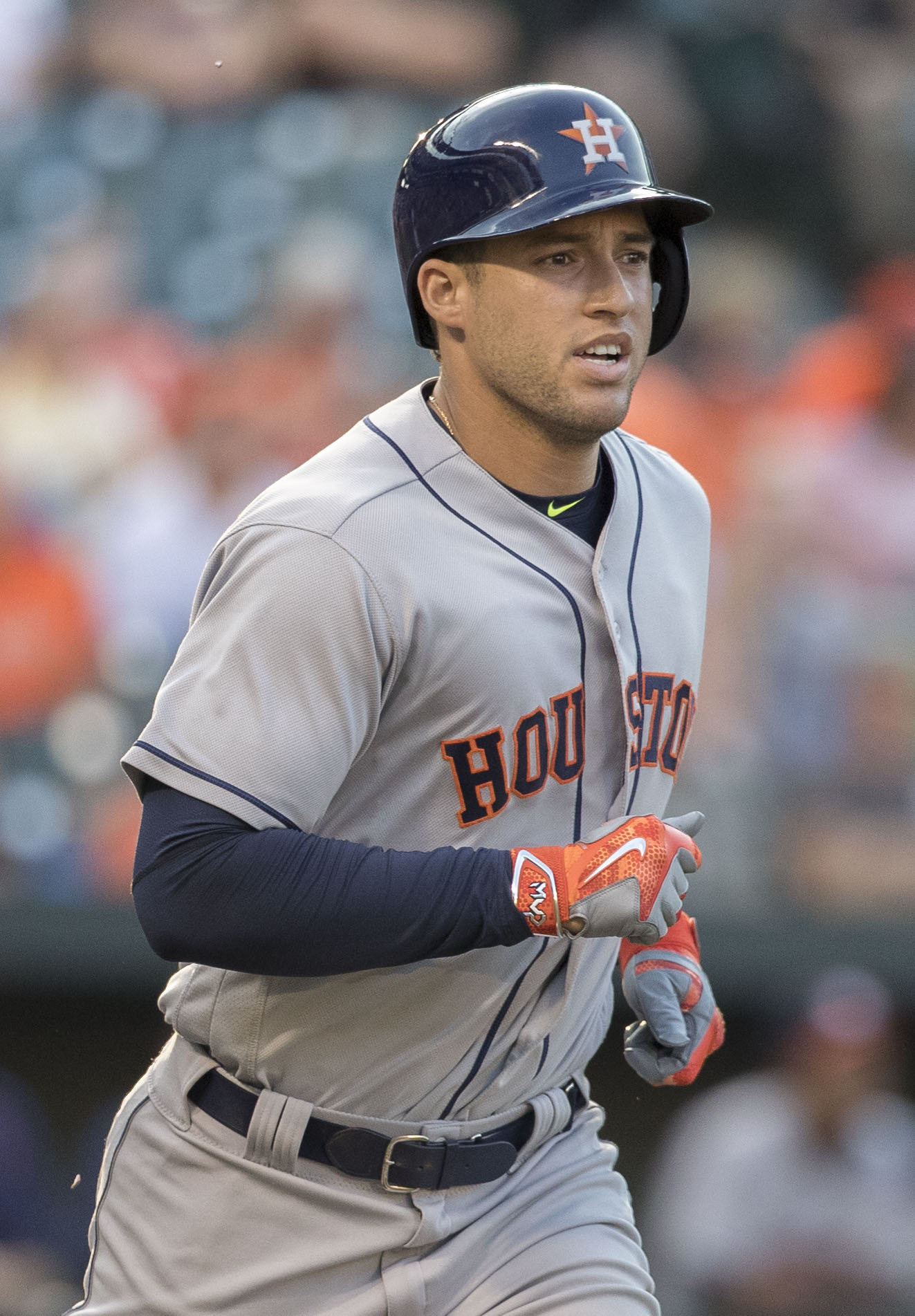
George Springer drove in the game-winning run in Game 2.

October 25, 2017 5:17 pm (PDT) at Dodger Stadium in Los Angeles, California, 93 °F (34 °C), clear
Team	1	2	3	4	5	6	7	8	9	10	11	R	H	E
Houston	0	0	1	0	0	0	0	1	1	2	2	7	14	1
Los Angeles	0	0	0	0	1	2	0	0	0	2	1	6	5	0
WP: Chris Devenski (1–0) LP: Brandon McCarthy (0–1); Home runs: HOU: Marwin González (1), Jose Altuve (1), Carlos Correa (1), George Springer (1); LAD: Joc Pederson (1), Corey Seager (1), Yasiel Puig (1), Charlie Culberson (1); Attendance: 54,293; Boxscore

The starting pitchers for Game 2 were Rich Hill for the Dodgers and Justin Verlander for the Astros. The Astros scored first when Bregman drove in Josh Reddick with a hit in the third inning. Hill struck out seven in four innings but was replaced by Kenta Maeda in the fifth. Joc Pederson tied the game with a home run in the bottom of the fifth inning, and the Dodgers took the lead when Corey Seager hit a two-run home run after Taylor walked in the bottom of the sixth inning. Verlander allowed two hits, both home runs, in his six innings pitched. In the top of the eighth, Bregman hit a ground-rule double just off of Dodger right fielder Yasiel Puig’s glove (Puig threw his glove down in anger over just missing the catch), and Carlos Correa drove in the Astros' second run of the game on a single. This ended the Dodgers bullpen's streak of 28 consecutive scoreless innings in the postseason. Marwin González hit a home run off Jansen in the ninth to tie the game. This was only Jansen's second blown save all season and snapped his streak of converting his first 12 postseason save opportunities, a major league record.

The game went into extra innings. Jose Altuve and Correa hit back-to-back home runs off Josh Fields in the tenth inning to put the Astros in the lead. Yuli Gurriel doubled after the home run, but Fields was replaced by Tony Cingrani and Gurriel was stranded. In the bottom of the inning, Yasiel Puig hit a solo home run off of Ken Giles and Enrique Hernández drove in Logan Forsythe, who had walked and advanced on a wild pitch, to tie the game, with the latter being the Dodgers' first run that was not driven in by a home run. In the next inning, pinch-hitter Cameron Maybin singled and stole second. George Springer hit a two-run home run for the Astros off of Brandon McCarthy to retake the lead. In the bottom of the 11th inning, Charlie Culberson homered off of Chris Devenski, who later struck out Puig to end the game. This was the first ever World Series game in which a team hit home runs in the ninth, tenth and eleventh inning. The teams set a new record for combined home runs in a single World Series game with eight and this was the first time in MLB history, regular season or postseason, that five home runs were hit in extra innings. The Astros won their first World Series game in franchise history as they had been swept in their previous appearance in 2005.

=== Game 3 ===
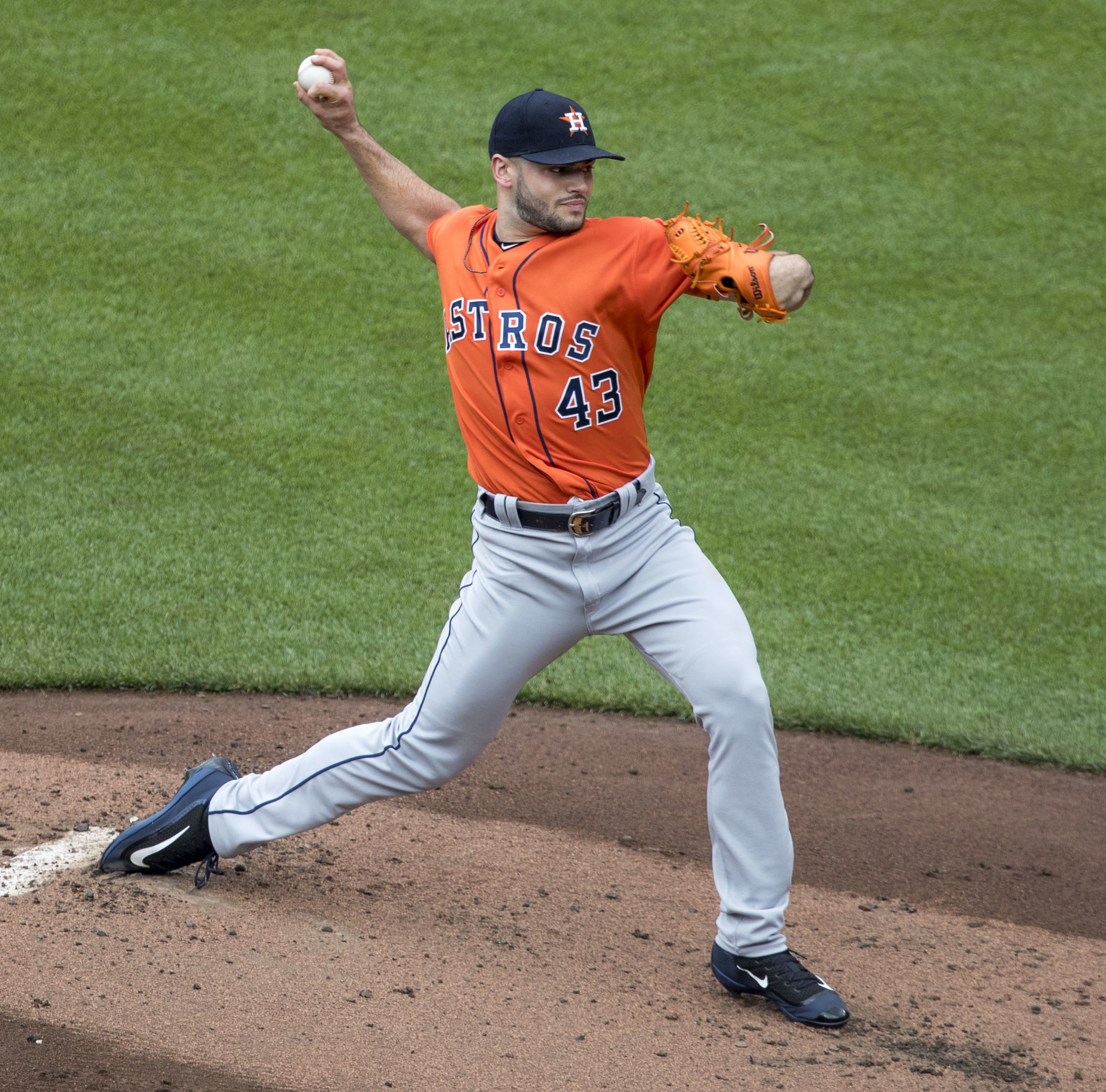
Lance McCullers Jr. earned the win in Game 3.

October 27, 2017 7:21 pm (CDT) at Minute Maid Park in Houston, Texas, 65 °F (18 °C), roof closed
Team	1	2	3	4	5	6	7	8	9	R	H	E
Los Angeles	0	0	1	0	0	2	0	0	0	3	4	2
Houston	0	4	0	0	1	0	0	0	X	5	12	0
WP: Lance McCullers Jr. (1–0) LP: Yu Darvish (0–1) Sv: Brad Peacock (1); Home runs: LAD: None; HOU: Yuli Gurriel (1); Attendance: 43,282; Boxscore

The starting pitchers for Game 3 were Yu Darvish for the Dodgers and Lance McCullers Jr. for the Astros. The Astros scored four of their five runs in the bottom of the second inning. Yuli Gurriel led off with a home run. Josh Reddick followed with a double and Evan Gattis walked. González and Brian McCann then hit back-to-back RBI singles and Bregman hit a sacrifice fly for the final run. Darvish left the game after 1 2/3 innings, which was the shortest outing of his career. The Dodgers scored one run in the top of the third inning as Seager grounded into a double play after McCullers loaded the bases with three consecutive walks. The Astros added another run in the fifth off Dodger reliever Tony Watson when Reddick singled and scored on an RBI single by Evan Gattis, aided by a throwing error by Watson. The Dodgers scored two in the sixth to cut the lead to two on an RBI groundout by Puig and a wild pitch. McCullers wound up pitching 5 1/3 innings and allowed three runs on four hits to earn the win. Brad Peacock replaced McCullers, completing the final 3 2/3 innings with no hits allowed and four strikeouts to earn his first major league save. It was the longest hitless World Series relief outing since Ron Taylor's four innings in Game 4 of the 1964 Series, and tied Ken Clay for the longest hitless postseason save, first accomplished in the 1978 ALCS.

Gurriel made a racially insensitive gesture in the dugout after his home run. He stretched the sides of his eyes and mouthing the Spanish word chinito, which translates to "little Chinese Boy"; Darvish is from Japan. Gurriel apologized, and said that anyone from Asia is called a chino in Cuba, although he acknowledged knowing that the term was offensive in Japan from having played there. As a result, Rob Manfred, the Commissioner of Baseball, suspended Gurriel for the first five games of the 2018 MLB season without pay, but allowed him to continue playing in the World Series.

=== Game 4 ===
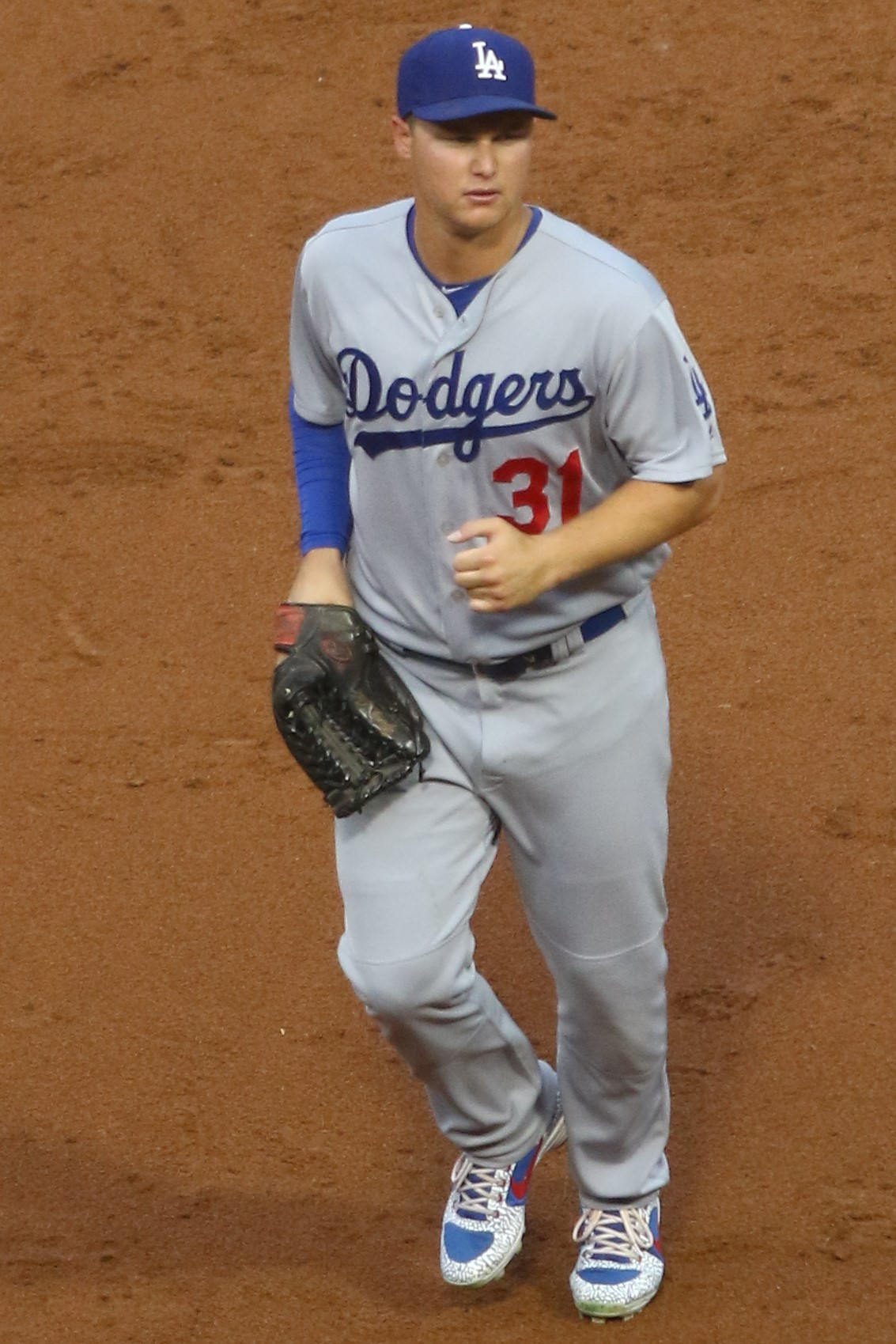
Joc Pederson hit a three-run home run in Game 4.

October 28, 2017 7:20 pm (CDT) at Minute Maid Park in Houston, Texas, 67 °F (19 °C), roof closed
Team	1	2	3	4	5	6	7	8	9	R	H	E
Los Angeles	0	0	0	0	0	0	1	0	5	6	7	0
Houston	0	0	0	0	0	1	0	0	1	2	2	0
WP: Tony Watson (1–0) LP: Ken Giles (0–1); Home runs: LAD: Joc Pederson (2); HOU: George Springer (2), Alex Bregman (2); Attendance: 43,322; Boxscore

The starting pitchers for Game 4 were Alex Wood for the Dodgers and Charlie Morton for the Astros. Springer homered off Wood in the bottom of the sixth for the first run of the ballgame. It was the only hit Wood allowed in 5 2/3 innings pitched in the game. The Dodgers tied it in the bottom of the seventh when Cody Bellinger doubled with one out off Morton and Logan Forsythe singled off reliever Will Harris to score Bellinger. Morton struck out seven and only allowed three hits and one run in 6 1/3 innings. The game stayed tied until the Astro bullpen fell apart in the top of the ninth. Ken Giles allowed a single to Seager and hit Justin Turner with a pitch. Bellinger then drove in the go-ahead run with a double. Joe Musgrove relieved Giles and intentionally walked Forsythe to load the bases and allowed a sacrifice fly to Austin Barnes and a three-run homer to Joc Pederson. Alex Bregman hit a home run off of Kenley Jansen in the bottom of the ninth inning to cut the lead to four, but the Dodgers won the game to even up the series. The Astros had two hits in the game; both were home runs. This was the first game in World Series history where both starting pitchers allowed four or fewer baserunners.

After Game 4, both teams' pitching coaches, Rick Honeycutt for the Dodgers and Brent Strom for the Astros, commented on how the baseball being used for the World Series is slicker than the baseball used during the regular season. Pitchers on both teams noted that this difference has made it more difficult for them to throw their sliders.

Two years after this game, when MLB sanctioned the Astros for sign stealing during the 2017 season, Alex Wood said he and catcher Austin Barnes changed signs every ten pitches because the Dodgers had suspected the Astros of sign stealing. Wood also stated that the team tried to get Clayton Kershaw, Game 5 starter, to follow the same method, but Kershaw did not think it was necessary and did not want to disrupt his routine.

=== Game 5 ===
External videos
- Game 5 Full replay on the MLB's official YouTube channel

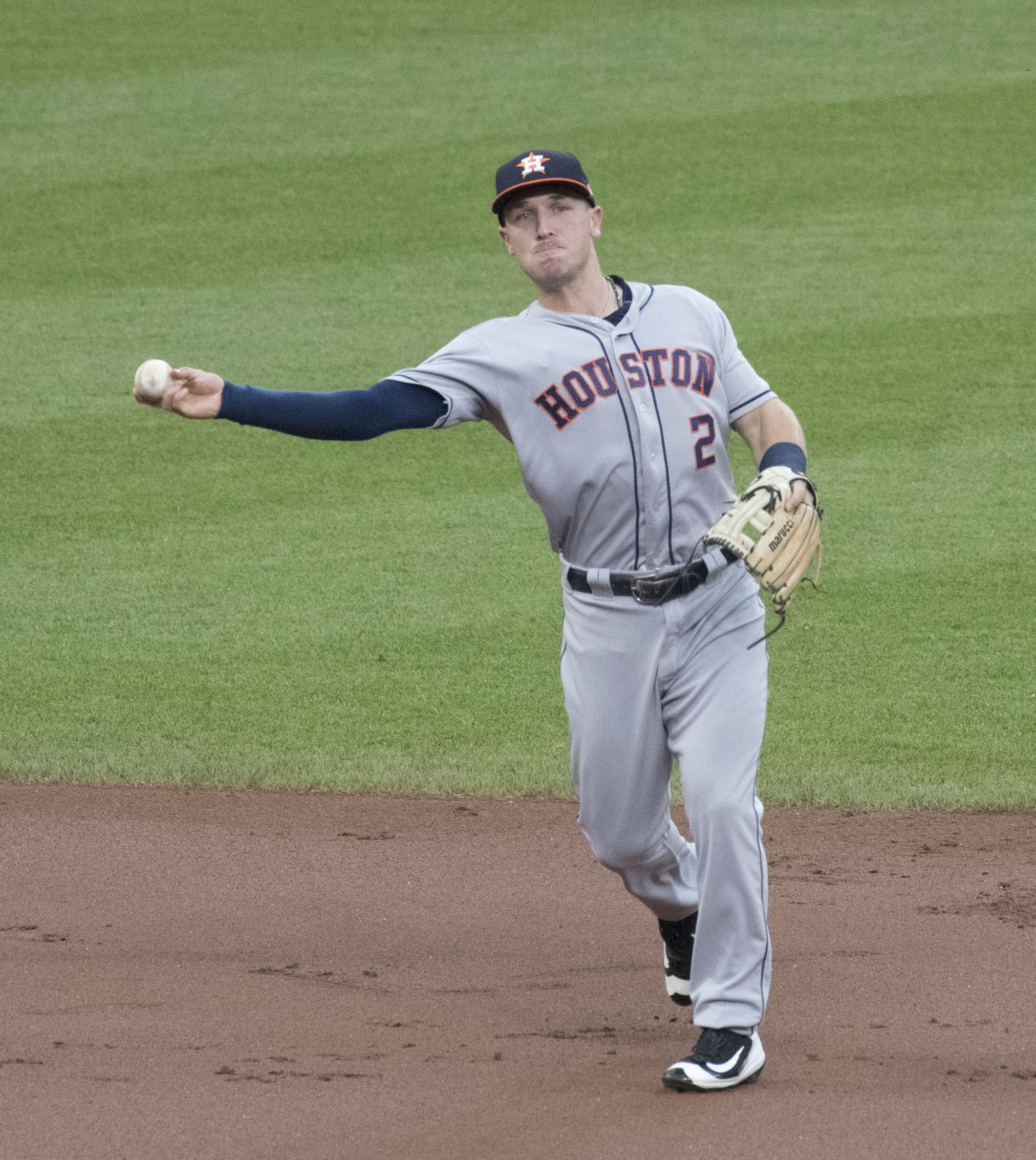
Alex Bregman drove in the game-winning run in Game 5.

October 29, 2017 7:21 pm (CDT) at Minute Maid Park in Houston, Texas, 69 °F (21 °C), roof closed
Team	1	2	3	4	5	6	7	8	9	10	R	H	E
Los Angeles	3	0	0	1	3	0	1	1	3	0	12	14	1
Houston	0	0	0	4	3	0	4	1	0	1	13	14	1
WP: Joe Musgrove (1–0) LP: Kenley Jansen (0–1); Home runs: LAD: Cody Bellinger (1), Yasiel Puig (2); HOU: Yuli Gurriel (2), Jose Altuve (2), George Springer (3), Carlos Correa (2), Brian McCann (1); Attendance: 43,300; Boxscore

Kershaw and Keuchel started Game 5, in a rematch of the opening game of the series. Forsythe singled in two runs off of Keuchel in the first inning to put the Dodgers up early. A third run scored on a throwing error by Gurriel. Barnes singled in the fourth to score Forsythe to put the Dodgers up. Keuchel pitched 3 2/3 innings for the Astros, allowing five hits and four runs (three earned). The Astros scored their first run with an RBI double by Correa in the bottom of the fourth inning, followed by a three-run home run by Gurriel to tie the game. Bellinger hit a three-run home run off of Collin McHugh in the top of the fifth to put the Dodgers back on top only for Altuve to hit his own three-run home run in the bottom of the inning off Kenta Maeda to tie it back up. Kershaw pitched 4 2/3 innings and allowed six runs on four hits and three walks.

Justin Turner led off the top of the seventh with a double. Hernandez attempted to bunt Turner over to third, but Turner was thrown out by Astro reliever Brad Peacock. Bellinger then hit a line drive triple that Springer narrowly missed on a dive to score Hernandez from first. In the bottom of the seventh inning, Springer hit a home run off the first pitch he saw off of Morrow, who was pitching for the third consecutive day, to tie the game. Bregman hit a broken-bat single and then scored on a double by Altuve to put the Astros ahead for the first time in the game. Altuve moved to third on a wild pitch, and then Correa hit a two-run home run to extend the lead. Seager doubled in a run in the top of the eighth inning to cut the lead to two, but McCann hit a home run in the bottom of the inning to re-extend the lead to three runs. That was the 21st home run of the series, tying the record set in the 2002 World Series. The Dodgers came back to tie it in the ninth. Puig broke the record with a two-run home run with Bellinger on first in the top of the ninth inning to make it a one-run game. Austin Barnes doubled with two outs, and Chris Taylor, down to his last strike, drove in Barnes to tie the game with a single. Dodgers' closer Kenley Jansen entered into the game in the bottom of the ninth and survived a two-out double to Gurriel and the game went into extra innings.

Astros pitcher Joe Musgrove pitched a scoreless top of the tenth inning before the Astros ended the game in the bottom half. McCann was hit by a pitch by Jansen to put him on base with two outs. Subsequently, Springer walked on five pitches to move McCann to second base. McCann was then replaced by pinch runner Derek Fisher. On the next pitch, Bregman hit a walk-off single, scoring Fisher with the winning run. The Astros became only the second team to come back twice from three runs down in a World Series game, the other was the Toronto Blue Jays in the 15–14 win during Game 4 of the 1993 World Series. The six game-tying home runs in the series to this point is the most for any World Series on record. This World Series set a new record for most players to hit a home run (14 to date in the World Series). With the teams combining to score 25 runs throughout the game, this was the highest scoring World Series game since the Florida Marlins defeated the Cleveland Indians 14–11 in Game 3 of the 1997 World Series. Game 5 lasted five hours and seventeen minutes, making it the third-longest World Series game in history by time.

=== Game 6 ===
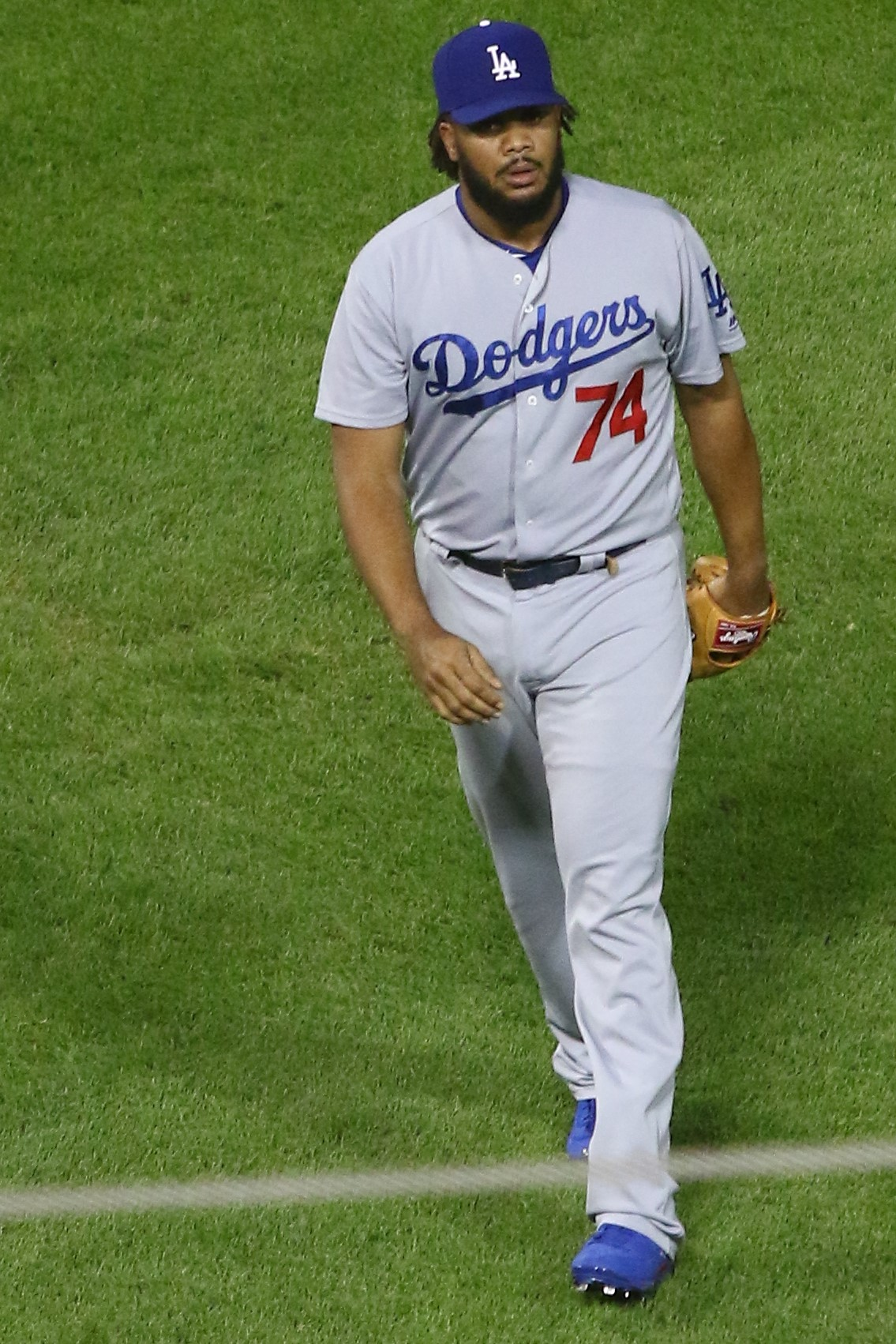
Kenley Jansen recorded a two-inning save in Game 6.

October 31, 2017, 5:21 pm (PDT) at Dodger Stadium in Los Angeles, California, 67 °F (19 °C), overcast
Team	1	2	3	4	5	6	7	8	9	R	H	E
Houston	0	0	1	0	0	0	0	0	0	1	6	0
Los Angeles	0	0	0	0	0	2	1	0	X	3	5	0
WP: Tony Watson (2–0) LP: Justin Verlander (0–1) Sv: Kenley Jansen (2); Home runs: HOU: George Springer (4); LAD: Joc Pederson (3); Attendance: 54,128; Boxscore

Game 6 featured the same starting pitchers as the second game: Verlander and Hill. Springer hit a home run off of Hill in the top of the third for the first run of the night. It was Springer's fourth homer of the series, tied for third all-time in a single series and joining Gene Tenace, in 1972, as the only players with four game-tying or go-ahead home runs in a World Series. Springer also joined Hank Bauer in the 1958 World Series and Barry Bonds in the 2002 World Series with four home runs in a series. The Astros loaded the bases in the fifth inning, but did not score. Hill pitched 4 2/3 innings, struck out five and allowed four hits and one run.

In the sixth inning, Taylor tied the game with an RBI double and Seager hit a sacrifice fly to give the Dodgers the lead. Verlander pitched six innings with nine strikeouts and only three hits allowed. Pederson hit a home run in the bottom of the seventh inning and Jansen pitched two scoreless innings for the save, forcing a winner-take-all game seven. Dodger reliever Tony Watson earned the win, and Joc Pederson tied a World Series record with his fifth consecutive game with an extra base hit. Andre Ethier, who appeared in the game as a pinch hitter, set a new Dodgers franchise record with his 50th career postseason game.

=== Game 7 ===
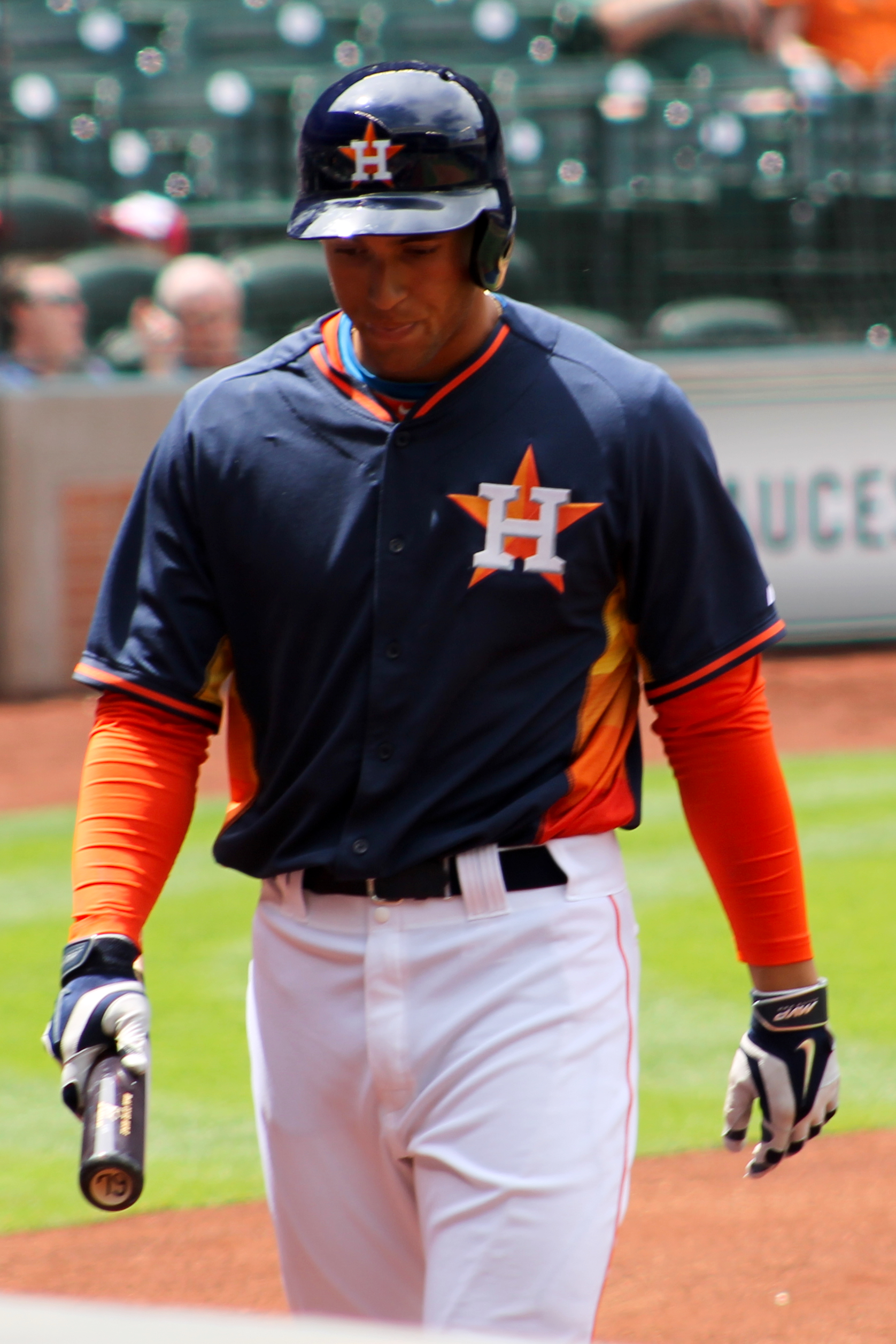
George Springer hit his fifth home run in Game 7, tying the World Series record.

November 1, 2017 5:21 pm (PDT) at Dodger Stadium in Los Angeles, California, 69 °F (21 °C), partly cloudy
Team	1	2	3	4	5	6	7	8	9	R	H	E
Houston	2	3	0	0	0	0	0	0	0	5	5	0
Los Angeles	0	0	0	0	0	1	0	0	0	1	6	1
WP: Charlie Morton (1–0) LP: Yu Darvish (0–2); Home runs: HOU: George Springer (5); LAD: None; Attendance: 54,124; Boxscore

This was the first World Series Game 7 to be played at Dodger Stadium (and the first Game 7 of any postseason series at the stadium since the 1988 NLCS, and the Dodgers' first World Series Game 7 since 1965 against the Minnesota Twins). It was also the first time since the 1931 World Series that a Game 7 occurred in a Series with both teams having won at least 100 games during the season. Besides, this was the first time since the 2001 World Series and 2002 World Series that back-to-back Fall Classics had a Game 7.

The starting pitchers for this game were the same as in the third game: McCullers and Darvish. Springer doubled to open the game and scored the first run on an error by Bellinger, which allowed Bregman to reach second base. Bregman stole third base and scored on an Altuve groundout. In the second, McCann walked and Marwin Gonzalez doubled to put men on second and third. A groundout by Astros pitcher McCullers scored McCann and advanced Gonzalez to third. Springer then hit a two-run home run, his fifth of the series, tying Reggie Jackson and Chase Utley for most home runs in a single World Series and setting a new record with 29 total bases in any postseason series. Darvish was pulled after the home run, and as in Game 3, Darvish lasted only 1 2/3 innings (tying the shortest outing of his career) and became the third pitcher with two starts of less than two innings in a World Series, and the first since Art Ditmar in the 1960 World Series. Brandon Morrow relieved Darvish and escaped the inning. In the process, Morrow became only the second pitcher to pitch in all seven games of a single World Series, joining the Athletics' Darold Knowles in the 1973 World Series. McCullers lasted only 2 1/3 innings himself but did not allow run; he allowed three hits and hit a World Series record four batters. This was the first Game 7 in World Series history where neither starting pitcher got past the third inning.

The Dodgers failed to score a run and left eight men on base through five innings. Andre Ethier hit a pinch-hit RBI single that scored Pederson in the sixth inning for the Dodgers' only run. They only had one hit in 13 chances with runners in scoring position in the game. Kershaw pitched four scoreless innings of relief in the game, and in the process, he broke Orel Hershiser's Dodgers postseason record with his 33rd strikeout. Morton pitched four innings of relief to earn the win, as Corey Seager grounded out to Jose Altuve, who threw to Yuli Gurriel to end the game, with the Astros winning their first championship in franchise history, and ending their 56-year drought. Springer won the World Series MVP Award.

After Game 7, the trophy presentation, usually taking place in the locker room whenever the visiting team clinches the series, took place on the losing team's field for the first time ever before a small crowd of mostly Astros fans that remained as most Dodgers fans left the stadium. Correa proposed to his girlfriend, 2016 Miss Texas USA winner Daniella Rodríguez, on live television during a postgame interview conducted by Rosenthal. She accepted.

More than a month later, a Sports Illustrated article revealed that the Astros had figured out how Darvish was tipping his pitches: "Darvish holds the ball at his side when he gets the sign from the catcher. Whether he re-grips or not as he brings the ball into his glove was the tip-off whether he was going to throw a slider/cutter or a fastball." This unnamed Astros player said the Astros had known about this going into Game 3 which they also won, but that they had an even better game plan for Game 7. After this revelation, 14-year veteran Chase Utley watched the film and later reported to Dodgers president of baseball operations Andrew Friedman that Darvish was not giving off any pitch-tipping cues.

=== Composite line score ===
2017 World Series (4–3): Houston Astros (AL) beat Los Angeles Dodgers (NL).

Team	1	2	3	4	5	6	7	8	9	10	11	R	H	E
Houston Astros	2	7	2	5	4	1	4	2	2	3	2	34	56	2
Los Angeles Dodgers	4	0	1	1	4	9	3	1	8	2	1	34	47	4
Home runs: HOU: George Springer (5), Jose Altuve (2), Alex Bregman (2), Carlos Correa (2), Yuli Gurriel (2), Marwin González (1), Brian McCann (1); LAD: Joc Pederson (3), Yasiel Puig (2), Cody Bellinger (1), Charlie Culberson (1), Corey Seager (1), Chris Taylor (1), Justin Turner (1); Total attendance: 346,702 Average attendance: 49,529; Winning player's share: $438,901.57. Losing player's share: $259,722.14.

== Broadcasting ==
=== Television ===
Fox broadcast the series in the United States, with Joe Buck serving as the play-by-play announcer, along with John Smoltz as color commentator and Ken Rosenthal and Tom Verducci as field reporters. For Fox Deportes, Rolando Nichols provided play-by-play while Carlos Álvarez and Edgar Gonzalez provided color commentary.

Kevin Burkhardt hosted the pregame shows, joined by analysts Keith Hernandez, David Ortiz, Alex Rodriguez, and Frank Thomas. Outside the United States, MLB International televised the series, with Matt Vasgersian on play-by-play and Buck Martinez doing color commentary.

In September 2017, American Spirit Media removed the signals of their Fox affiliates from DirecTV and U-verse systems. As a result, some DirecTV subscribers in portions of the Southeastern United States (as well as those in the Toledo market) were unable to watch the World Series.

==== Ratings ====
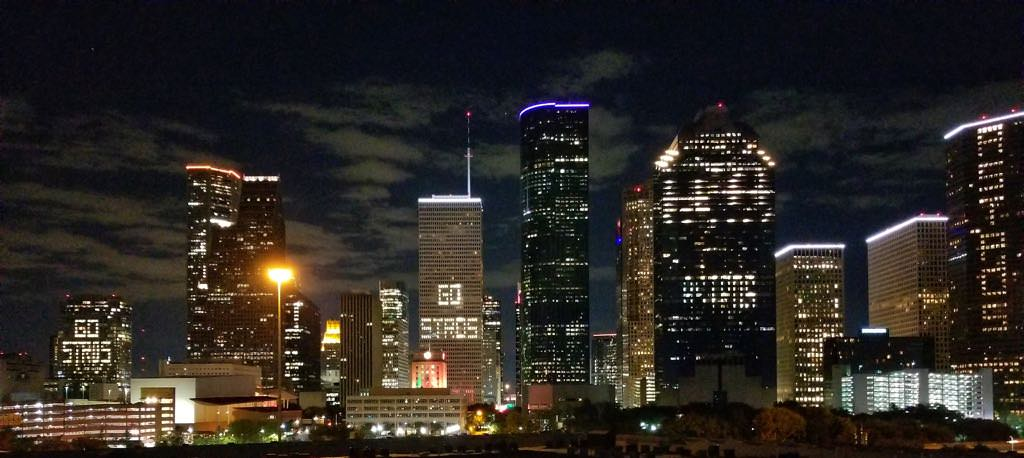
Downtown Houston skyline during the 2017 World Series

According to Nielsen ratings, this series was the third highest rated since 2005, trailing only the 2009 World Series and the 2016 World Series. For the second straight year, a World Series game, Game 5, beat out NBC Sunday Night Football in ratings. Until 2024, no other World Series would average more viewers.

Game	Ratings (households)	Share (households)	U.S. audience (in millions)	Ref
1	8.7	15	14.97	
2	9.2	18	15.48	
3	8.8	17	15.68	
4	8.7	17	15.40	
5	10.5	21	18.94	
6	12.6	23	22.23	
7	15.8	28	28.24	

=== Radio ===
ESPN Radio broadcast the series nationally in English, with Dan Shulman providing the play-by-play and Aaron Boone serving as color analyst. Tim Kurkjian and Buster Olney served as reporters for the network, while Marc Kestecher hosted the pre-game and post-game coverage along with analyst Chris Singleton. The ESPN Radio coverage was carried on affiliated stations throughout the United States and Canada, as well as online at ESPN.com and via the ESPN mobile app. Spanish-language coverage was provided by ESPN Deportes Radio, with Eduardo Ortega, Renato Bermúdez, José Francisco Rivera, and Orlando Hernández announcing.

Locally, both teams' flagship radio stations broadcast the series with their regular announcers. Sportstalk 790 aired the English-language broadcast for the Houston area, with Robert Ford and Steve Sparks calling the games. In Los Angeles, AM 570 LA Sports aired the English-language broadcast, with Charley Steiner and Rick Monday announcing. In Spanish, Univision America 1020 carried the broadcast, with Jaime Jarrín and Jorge Jarrín on the call. In Korean, Radio Korea 1540 aired the series, with Richard Choi and Chong Ho Yim in the booth.

== Sponsorship ==
For the first time, MLB sold presenting sponsorships to all of its postseason series; the internet television service YouTube TV is the first-ever presenting sponsor of the World Series. The series is officially known as the 2017 World Series Presented by YouTube TV. This sponsorship includes logo branding in-stadium and on official digital properties, as well as commercial inventory during Fox's telecasts of the games.

== Impact and aftermath ==
From 2017–2025, both the Astros and Dodgers dominated the World Series scene, with all but one World Series from such period featuring either team. The Astros to that point had made four World Series appearances, winning two in 2017, and 2022, while also losing two in 2019, and 2021. The Dodgers to that point had made five World Series appearances, winning three in 2020, 2024, and 2025, while losing two in 2017, and 2018. There have been quite a few chances at a much anticipated rematch between the two clubs in the World Series, but this has not occurred as of 2026.

=== Records ===
The 2017 World Series broke many records, most of which still stands today:

- At 103 °F (39 °C), Game 1 was the hottest postseason game on record.
- The 25 combined home runs is a World Series record that was previously set in the 2002 World Series at 21 home runs. The Astros also hold the team record for 15 home runs in a single World Series.
- Brandon Morrow's relief appearances in all seven games of the World Series tied a record with Darold Knowles as the most in World Series history. Coincidentally, Darold Knowles was the pitching coach at High-A Dunedin, the Toronto Blue Jays' Florida State League affiliate, during Morrow's tenure with the club.
- George Springer tied or claimed a number of individual records. His 5 home runs tied Chase Utley and Reggie Jackson for most in a single World Series. His total bases and extra-bases records still stand today with 29 and 8, respectively. In 2024, Freddie Freeman tied Springer with most consecutive home runs in a single World Series with 4.
- Dave Roberts surpassed Tony La Russa's 2011 pitching change record with 32 in total. With pitching change rules that went in effect before the 2020 season (pitchers were now to face at minimum three batters before a pitching change), this record will likely stay intact.
- Dodgers' rookie Cody Bellinger finished with 17 strikeouts establishing a new World Series and overall postseason record. The previous World Series record was tied with Javier Báez (2016) and Ryan Howard (2009) with 13 strikeouts.
- Both Game 7 starters, Lance McCullers and Yu Darvish, combined to pitch four innings, which was the fewest combined innings pitched in a winner-take-all game in World Series history. Additionally, Darvish was the second pitcher ever to fail to complete a second inning in two or more starts within the same World Series. The other was Art Ditmar, who did not complete two innings for the Yankees in Games 1 and 5 of the 1960 World Series against the Pirates. Later, Tony Gonsolin would join this list in the 2020 World Series. For McCullers, his 4 hit batters in Game 7 shattered a record for the most HBPs by any pitcher in a World Series game. The only pitchers to hit multiple batters in a postseason game were Roger Clemens (1986 ALCS) and Orel Hershiser (1988 NLCS).

=== Houston Astros ===
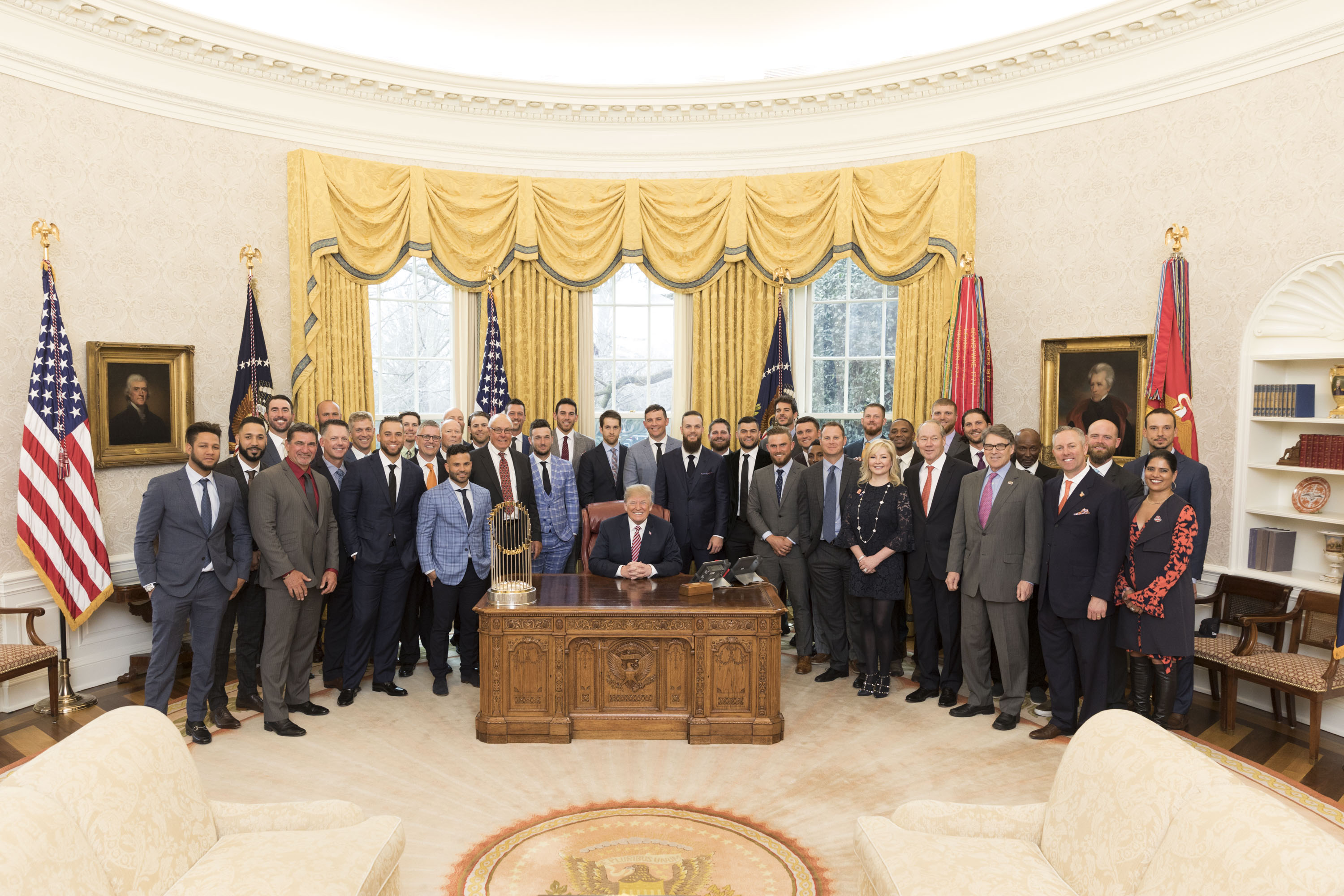
President Donald Trump poses with the Astros at the White House following their World Series win.

This was Houston's first professional sports championship since the Houston Dynamo won the MLS Cup in 2007, and the first in one of the traditional "Big Four" American sports leagues since the Houston Rockets won back-to-back NBA championships in 1994 and 1995.

The Astros earned $30,420,155.57 from postseason pool money to split among team personnel; each share was worth $438,901.57. The Dodgers received $20,280,103.72, with shares of $259,722.14 The sportsbooks in Nevada lost $11.4 million in November 2017, a record for baseball-related betting.

The city of Houston held a parade for the Astros on November 3, 2017, which Mayor Sylvester Turner proclaimed was "Houston Astros' Day". Schools in Houston were closed for the day. An estimated 750,000 to one million attended the parade. Springer and Altuve appeared on the cover of Sports Illustrated's November 13, 2017, issue, with Altuve holding the Commissioner's Trophy and Springer holding a copy of a Sports Illustrated from 2014 that predicted the Astros would win the 2017 World Series. The Astros' win has been seen as a morale boost for the city of Houston, which 9 weeks earlier had suffered tremendous damage due to Hurricane Harvey. According to Manny Fernandez and Paul Debenedetto of the New York Times, "Every city wants a World Series victory. Houston, post-Harvey, needed one."

From 2017 to 2023, the Astros made it to the American League Championship Series seven consecutive times; this set the record for most consecutive ALCS appearances, and second-most LCS appearances after the 1991–1999 Atlanta Braves. Of these, the Astros won four out of seven pennants, losing in 2018 against the Boston Red Sox, 2020 against the Tampa Bay Rays, and 2023 against the Texas Rangers, while winning in 2017, 2019, and 2022 against the New York Yankees and 2021 against the Red Sox. They would further lose the 2019 World Series against the Washington Nationals and the 2021 World Series against the Atlanta Braves before winning their second World Series in 2022 against the Philadelphia Phillies. Five players – Jose Altuve, Alex Bregman, Yuli Gurriel, Lance McCullers, Jr. and Justin Verlander – were on both championship teams; furthermore, 2017 Astros pitcher Charlie Morton was on the champion 2021 Braves. The Astros’ ALCS streak ended in 2024 by the hands of former manager A.J Hinch, and the Detroit Tigers.

=== Los Angeles Dodgers ===
After the season, Yu Darvish became a free agent for the first time in his career, and he chose not to re-sign with the Dodgers, as there was much fan ire against him for his disappointing World Series outings that many felt had cost the Dodgers the title. Darvish signed with the Cubs and continued to struggle with performance and injury in 2018 and early in the season in 2019, before returning to his pre-2017 World Series form for the second half of 2019 and the entire 2020 season. He was traded to the San Diego Padres, a division rival of the Dodgers, prior to the 2021 season.

The Dodgers returned to the World Series in 2018, where they lost to the Boston Red Sox in five games to become the first MLB team to lose the World Series in consecutive years since the 2010–2011 Texas Rangers, and the second time in Los Angeles Dodgers history that they lost consecutive World Series titles, with the other occurrence being in 1977, and 1978, both against the New York Yankees. After losing in the 2019 National League Division Series against the Washington Nationals, the Dodgers won their seventh championship in 2020 against the Tampa Bay Rays in the COVID-19-affected season. All three of the Dodgers' teams from 2021 to 2023 won 100 games or more (winning a franchise record 111 games in 2022), but they won two combined playoff series in those years, all in 2021. The Dodgers would then win consecutive World Series in 2024 and 2025, becoming the first repeat champions since the Yankees a quarter of a century ago.

== Relation to Houston Astros sign stealing scandal ==
Before the 2019 World Series, several Dodgers reached out to Washington Nationals second baseman Brian Dozier and pitcher Daniel Hudson, who had been with Los Angeles the previous year, to warn them that the Astros were elaborately stealing signs.

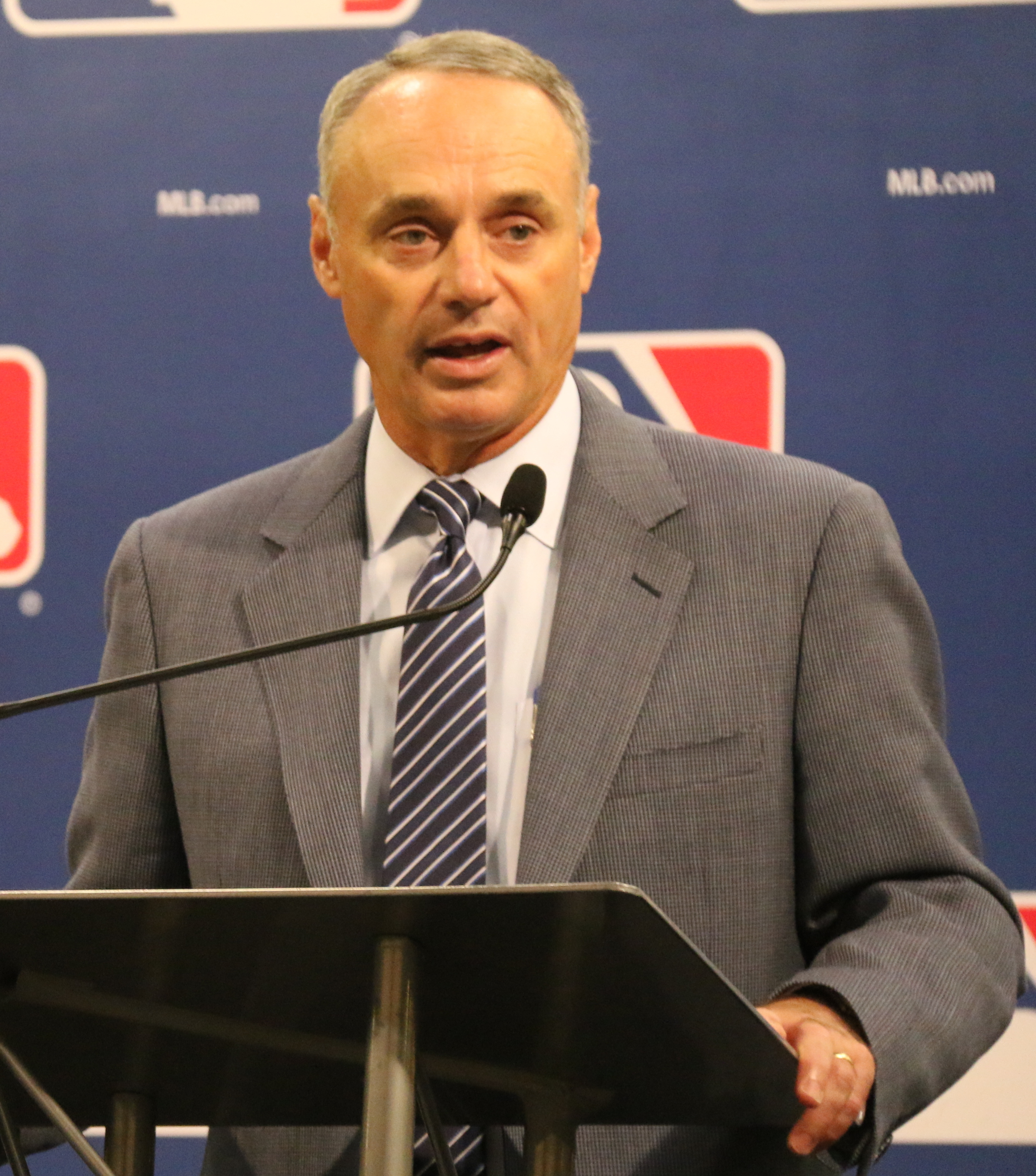
Commissioner Rob Manfred began an investigation into the Astros' sign stealing after Mike Fiers' allegations.

After the 2019 season, former Houston pitcher Mike Fiers alleged that the 2017 Astros used technology to illicitly steal their opponents' signs and relay them to their hitters. His claims were later confirmed by numerous citizen sleuths, who discovered that the Astros used this method throughout the 2017 season, and part of the 2018 season. MLB and the Astros opened an investigation into this sign stealing allegation. MLB found the Astros used technology to cheat during their 2017 season and suspended Hinch and Astros general manager Jeff Luhnow for one season; the Astros fired Luhnow and Hinch the same day. Alex Cora, who was the Astros' bench coach in 2017 and the Red Sox' manager from 2018 to 2019, parted ways with the Red Sox after the scandal broke. Carlos Beltran, a member of the 2017 team who had recently been hired by the New York Mets, was also fired for his involvement in the cheating scandal before getting the chance to manage the team. Cora was re-hired for the 2021 season in Boston, while Beltran eventually joined the Mets’ front office. Furthermore, Hinch was named the Tigers' manager a few days after the conclusion of his season-long suspensions. Besides Beltran, no other Astros players were punished. On November 8, 2020, ex-Astros general manager Jeff Luhnow sued the Astros, alleging that Astros owner Jim Crane and Major League Baseball Commissioner Rob Manfred negotiated penalties for the sign-stealing scandal that enabled the team to paint Luhnow as “the scapegoat for the organization and fire its general manager in order to save more than $22 million in guaranteed salary.”

Long time baseball writer Buster Olney said, "front-office staffers around baseball cannot remember a circumstance of such widespread and loud player-to-player condemnation." Frustrated comments from players increased when spring training began in February. Many players criticized the Astros, especially after their press conference at the beginning of camp. Many of the condemnations came from members of the Dodgers, whom the Astros defeated in the 2017 World Series, and the Yankees, whom the Astros defeated in the ALCS in both 2017 and 2019. The Dodgers were the only team to release a statement the week the report was released, merely stating that they had been ordered by MLB not to comment on the punishments or "any wrongdoing during the 2017 World Series."

On July 29, 2020, Dodgers reliever Joe Kelly was issued an eight-game suspension after throwing at Alex Bregman and Carlos Correa of the Houston Astros and inciting a benches-clearing incident after a strikeout of Correa. This incident occurred on the first meeting between the Astros and Dodgers after the MLB completed their investigation. Kelly's pouting face as he mocked Correa complaining about the near hit by pitch became an internet meme.

In 2020, ESPN writer Sam Miller ranked the 2017 Series the 23rd best World Series of all-time (and the fifth best since 2000), noting the prowess of both teams and the intensity of all seven games, but also noting the sign stealing scandal has tainted the series, comparing it to the 1919 World Series.

Before the start of the 2023 season, Red Sox manager Alex Cora, one of the alleged ring leaders in the sign-stealing scandal, personally apologized to 2017 Dodgers Kenley Jansen, Justin Turner, and Kiké Hernandez—all of whom were members of Cora's Red Sox by this time. "I just felt like I wanted to cry at that moment when he said that," Jansen told WEEI. "Because I felt like that was the best season I ever had in my whole career because I dominated the whole year, dominated the playoffs, and the Houston Astros were the only ones who put the ball in play. It’s over with, and you can’t change stuff, but what we can do is appreciate when someone steps up and comes forward and be accountable for what they did."

== See also ==
- 2017 Korean Series
- 2017 Japan Series
- Astros–Dodgers rivalry
- Houston Astros sign stealing scandal
