= Hailey Dawson =

American record setter

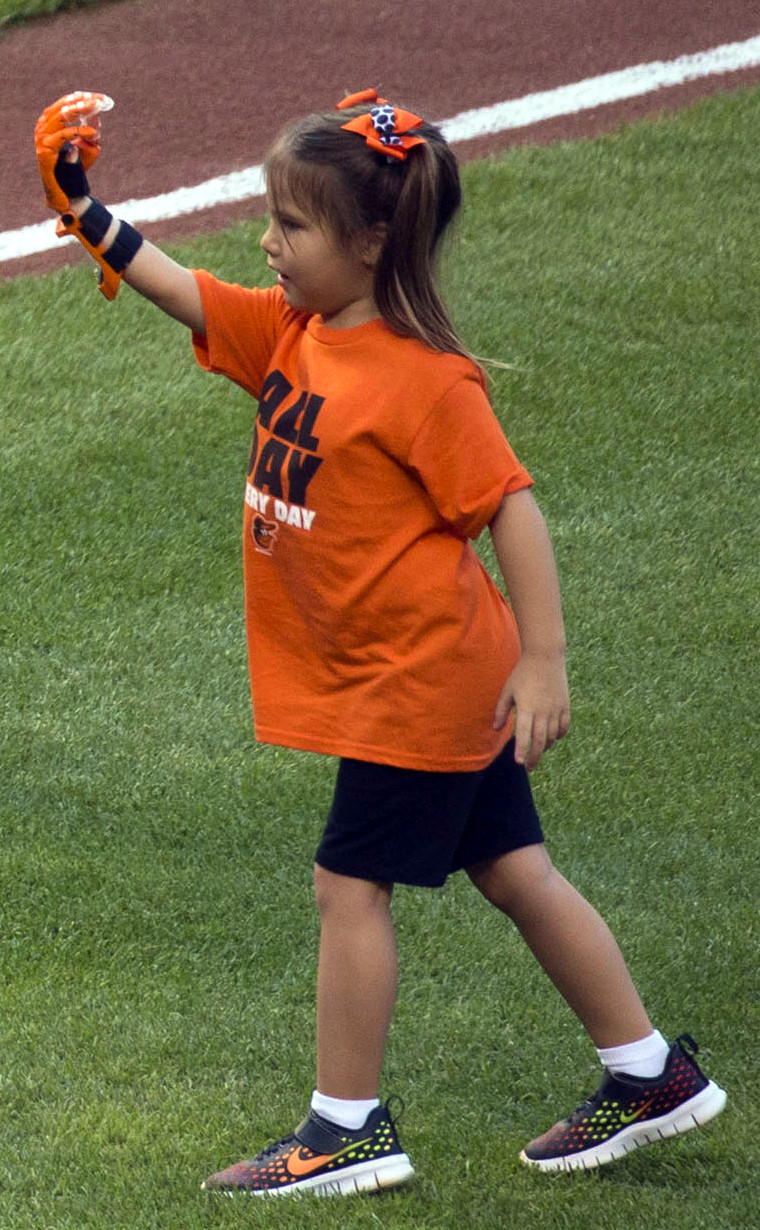
- Dawson throwing out the first pitch at Oriole Park, 2015
- Born: March 2, 2010 (age 16); Henderson, Nevada, United States
- Known for: First person to throw out ceremonial first pitch in all 30 Major League Baseball stadiums

Hailey Dawson (born March 2, 2010) is an American girl who is the first person to throw out the ceremonial first pitch in all 30 Major League Baseball stadiums. Born with Poland syndrome, she is missing three fingers on her right hand and has an underdeveloped pinky and thumb. At age 5, she was fitted with a 3D-printed robotic hand by the University of Nevada, Las Vegas, College of Engineering.

She came to national prominence in 2017 when she expressed a desire to use her robotic hand to throw out the ceremonial first pitch in all 30 Major League Baseball parks. She completed her goal on September 16, 2018, with an appearance at Angel Stadium. She has also been honored with dropping the puck at a 2018 Vegas Golden Knights–Philadelphia Flyers hockey game.

== Biography ==
Hailey Dawson was born in Henderson, Nevada, on March 2, 2010. Her father, Greg, is a corrections officer for the Las Vegas Metropolitan Police Department, and her mother, Yong, is a photographer. She has an older brother, Zach.

Hailey was born with Poland syndrome, believed to have stemmed from a lack of blood supply at six to seven gestational weeks. She is missing a right pectoral muscle and three fingers on her right hand; the pinky and thumb on her right hand are also underdeveloped. Her left hand is fully functional.

== Robotic hand ==
The University of Nevada, Las Vegas, College of Engineering built a robotic hand for Dawson in response to a request from her mother, Yong. With the cost of regular prostheses exceeding $20,000, and the foreseeable need for Hailey to require new prostheses as she grows, Yong sought a less expensive solution. She found open-source designs for a 3D-printed prosthesis posted online by a South African organization called RoboHand, and asked the UNLV College of Engineering to produce one for her daughter. The college agreed to take on both the project and the development costs. After experimenting with several RoboHand designs, the college ended up designing their own robotic hand from scratch and printing it on their in-house 3D printer.

While many students in the department worked on the project in its early stages, graduate student Maria Gerardi eventually became the chief designer of Dawson's robotic hand. As Dawson grows, Gerardi modifies the hand using computer software. Dawson will likely need a new hand every year.

The robotic hand is constructed from ABS plastic with rubber joints held together with a type of fishing wire. It includes about 30 parts. The hand does not operate on electronics, but on wrist movement: when Dawson flexes her wrist, the fingers grip; when she extends her wrist, the fingers uncurl. In 2017, Gerardi added an adjustable thumb and fingertip ridges to help Dawson grip items better. The hand is secured to her wrist with Velcro straps. Per Hailey's request, the hand is fitted with an arm covering so she can collect autographs of players at the stadiums she visits.

Each robotic hand takes about one week to make and costs $200 in components. Dawson's mother can easily "adjust tension screws or reattach fingers to joints" using a set of tools.

Dawson uses the hand to grip and throw baseballs. She throws the ball underhand.

== Ceremonial first pitches ==
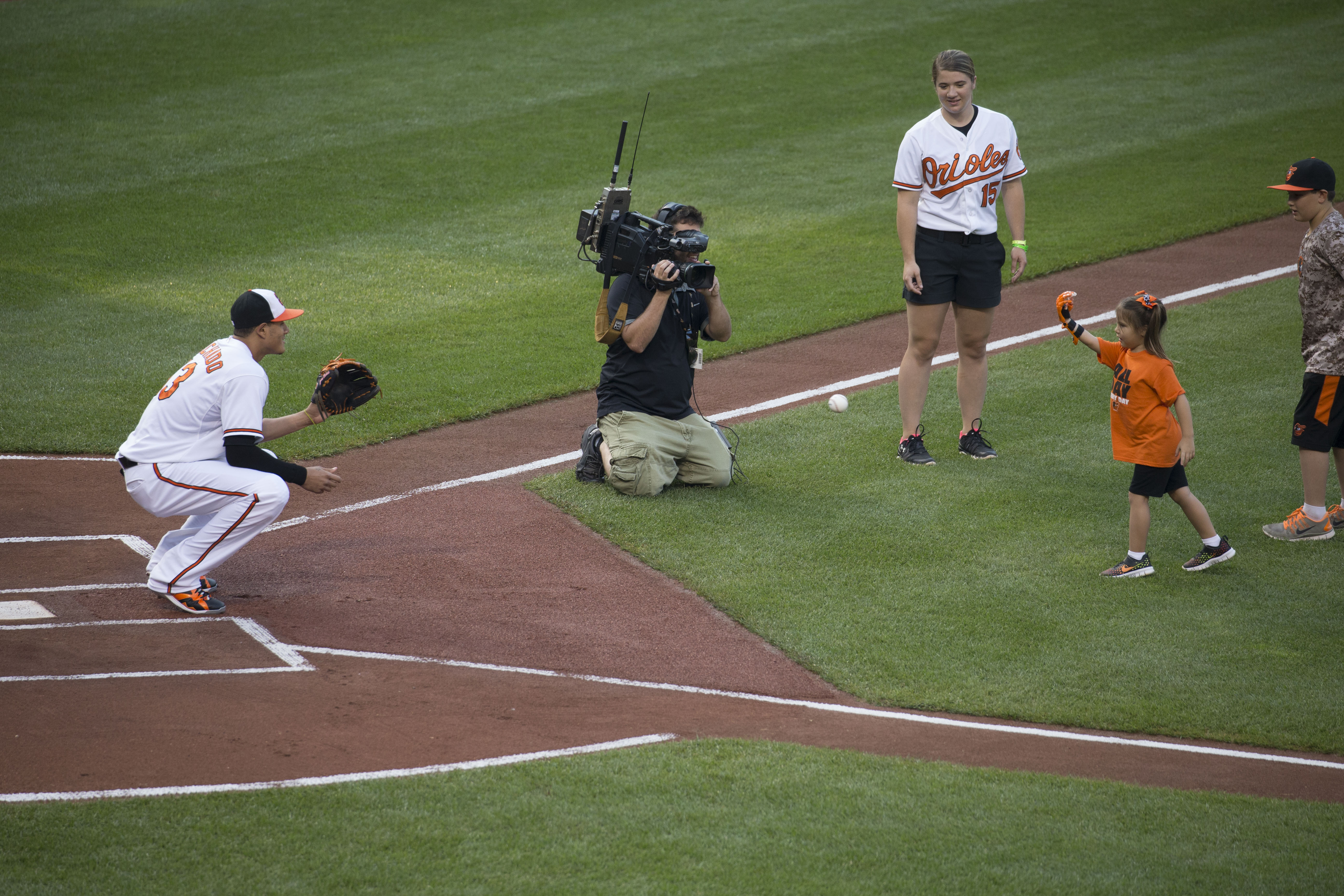
Dawson throwing out the first pitch to Manny Machado at Oriole Park, August 2015

Dawson made her first ceremonial first pitch at a UNLV Rebels baseball game in 2015 shortly after receiving her first 3D-printed robotic hand at age 5. She then expressed a desire to throw out the first pitch at a Baltimore Orioles game, as her father, a Maryland native, had made the team a family favorite. She appeared at Oriole Park at Camden Yards in August 2015. Dawson next posted a request on Instagram to meet Bryce Harper, a fellow Las Vegas native, and in June 2017 threw out the first pitch to him at Nationals Park.

In 2017, Dawson expressed a wish to throw out the first pitch at all 30 Major League Baseball stadiums. A September 2017 video report of her quest posted on Twitter by Bleacher Report went viral. In response, many Major League teams extended invitations to her. Major League Baseball also invited her to throw out the first pitch at Game 4 of the 2017 World Series at Minute Maid Park in Houston, Texas.

Dawson began her "Journey to 30" quest to pitch in the remaining 27 stadiums during the 2018 Major League Baseball season with an appearance at Petco Park, home of the San Diego Padres, in late March. On September 16, she reached her goal with an appearance at Angel Stadium, making her the first person to throw out the ceremonial first pitch in all 30 Major League Baseball stadiums. United Airlines flew her and family members to each stadium at no cost.

For each stadium Dawson pitched at, the UNLV College of Engineering produced a 3D-printed robotic hand customized with the home team's logo and colors. For her appearance in Game 4 of the 2017 World Series at Minute Maid Park, Gerardi printed and hand-painted two models of the hand featuring the series' gold and blue logo.

After reaching her goal of throwing out the first pitch in all 30 MLB stadiums, Dawson donated her Baltimore Orioles-themed robotic hand, which was signed by 13 members of the team and staff, to the National Baseball Hall of Fame and Museum.

== Other honors ==
In 2016, Dawson wore a 3D-printed robotic hand inscribed with the seal of the president of the United States when she toured the White House and met then-President Barack Obama.

On February 11, 2018, Dawson was invited to drop the puck at a hockey game between the Vegas Golden Knights and Philadelphia Flyers. Her customized 3D-printed hand sported the colors of the Golden Knights, and she also wore their jersey. She threw out the first pitch for the opening night of UNLV Rebels baseball on February 16.

Dawson was the recipient of the first Las Vegas Baseball Ambassador Award presented by the Society for American Baseball Research's Las Vegas chapter in February 2018.

On August 2, 2019, Dawson was invited back to Oriole Park at Camden Yards to throw out the ceremonial first pitch before an Orioles–Blue Jays game.

In 2019, Topps issued an Allen & Ginter card featuring Dawson.
