= Symbrachydactyly =

Congenital abnormality characterized by improperly formed fingers and toes

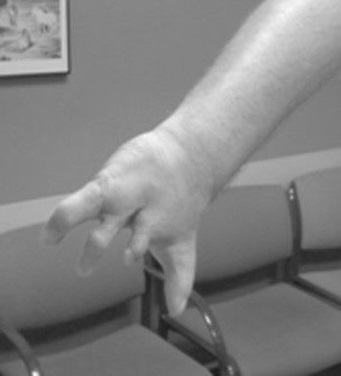
- Right hand symbrachydactyly in Poland syndrome.
- Specialty: Medical genetics

Symbrachydactyly is a congenital abnormality, characterized by limb anomalies consisting of brachydactyly, cutaneous syndactyly and global hypoplasia of the hand or foot. In many cases, bones will be missing from the fingers and some fingers or toes may be missing altogether. The ends of the hand may have "nubbins"—small stumps of soft tissue where the finger would have developed, which may have tiny residual nails.

No clear statistics are available regarding the incidence rate for symbrachydactyly. This may be due, in part, to the wide variety of definitions and classifications that are used in diagnosis.

In most cases, children born with symbrachydactyly are able to adapt to their physical limitations and experience a fully functional life with no treatment. Most children with this condition can use their hands well enough to do all the usual things children do. Possible treatment includes surgery or a routine of regularly stretching the fingers.

== Cause ==
The cause of symbrachydactyly is unknown. One possible cause might be an interruption of the blood supply to the developing arm at four to six weeks of pregnancy. There is no known link between the condition and the mother's behavior during pregnancy. There is also no increased risk of her having another child with the same condition, or that the child will pass the condition on to his or her children.

== Treatment ==
Most children with symbrachydactyly have excellent function in daily activities. Due to the length of their arm, they do not qualify for most artificial limbs. However, some adaptive prosthetics and equipment for sports and leisure activities may be helpful when the child is older. Children who demonstrate some functional movement in their remaining fingers and within the palm are evaluated for possible surgery such as toe transfers.

== See also ==
- Oligodactyly – Developmental anomaly of fewer fingers and toes
- Poland syndrome – Malformation of the chest muscle and fingers on one side of the body
