= Alfred Poland =

British surgeon

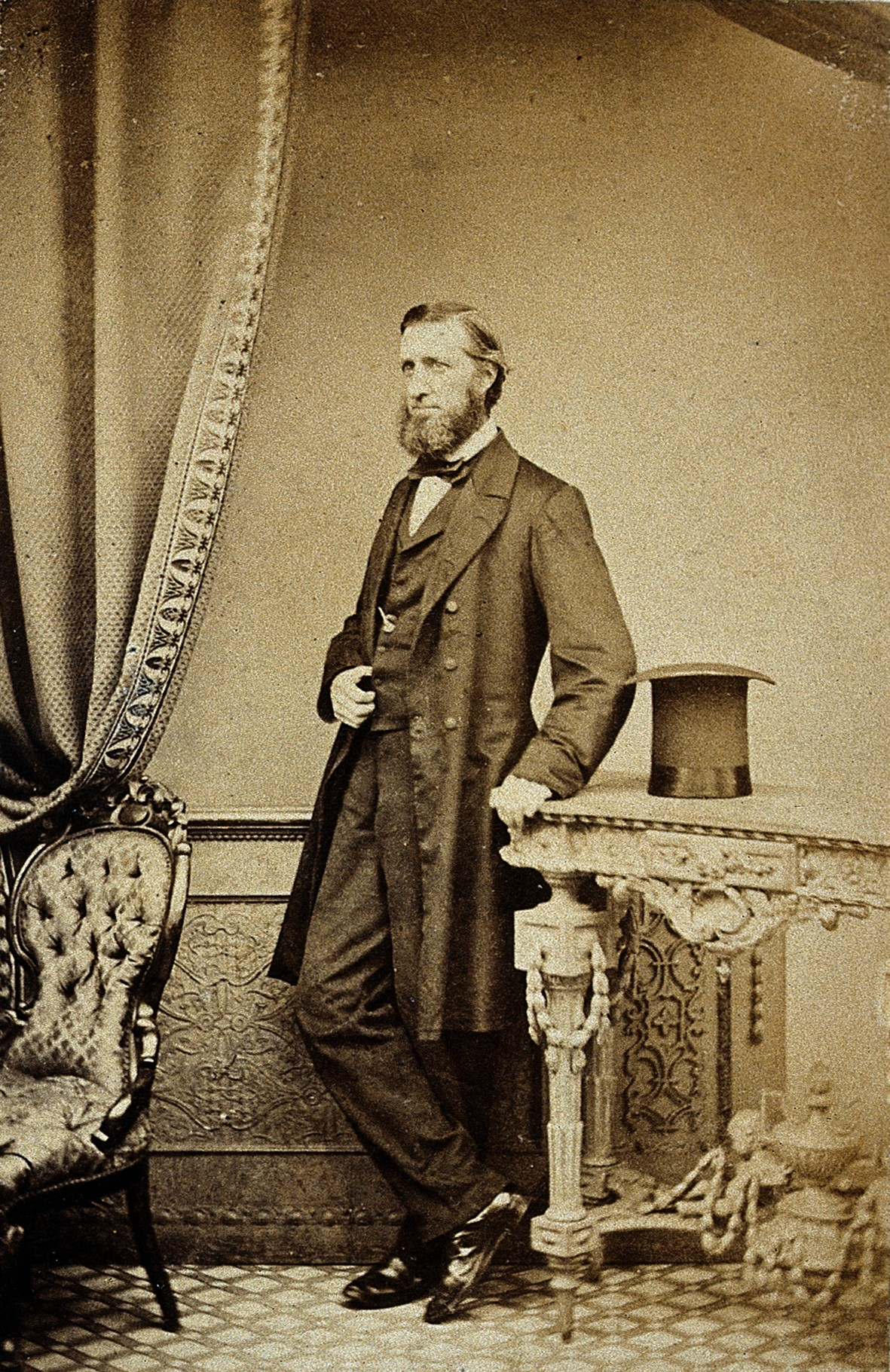
- Born: 30 August 1822
- Died: 21 August 1872 (aged 49)
- Known for: Poland Syndrome
- Medical career
- Profession: Surgeon
- Notable works: ‘’Deficiency of the pectoral muscles’’, 1841

Alfred Poland (30 August 1822 – 21 August 1872) was a 19th-century British surgeon. He is now best known for the first account of the condition later known as Poland syndrome, a congenital deformity now described as an underdevelopment or absence of the chest muscle (pectoralis) on one side of the body and webbing of the fingers (cutaneous syndactyly) of the hand on the same side (ipsilateral hand).

== Early life ==
He was born in London, England, the son of William Poland, and educated at Highgate, London, Paris and Frankfurt.

== Career ==
In 1839 he became a pupil of Aston Key at Guy's Hospital and after qualifying became Demonstrator of Anatomy, Assistant Surgeon to Guy's Hospital in 1849 and full Surgeon in 1861. He was then put in general charge of the Ophthalmic Department. From 1848-1861 he was Surgeon to the Royal Ophthalmic Hospital, Moorfields, but then abandoned ophthalmic practice due to ill health. He continued to see a few patients at Guy's up to his early death in 1872.

Poland described the disease that bears his name (Poland syndrome) in 1841, in a paper titled "Deficiency of the pectoral muscles", in which he described the dissected body of George Elt, a deceased convict. He received the eponym more than a century later in 1962 through the recognition of British surgeon Patrick Wensley Clarkson (1911-1969) after he operated on a case similar to that of Poland. He was awarded the Fothergillian prize in 1853 by the London Medical Society for his essay on "Injuries and Wounds of the Abdomen".

== Reputation and character ==
Apart from his surgical dexterity he was renowned at the hospital for his encyclopedic knowledge and the excellence of his presentations, both oral and written. He was an extremely popular teacher, but his career was punctuated by recurrent illness so that he remarked that he was like a cat and had nine lives. After one severe bout of hemoptysis, his physician ordered him to bed, only to see him the next day doing the rounds with his students.

Alfred Poland was a modest, retiring man, who was quite careless about his appearance. He was warned by the Treasurer to dress more decently and cleanly, but ignored this advice. He was known by his colleagues to be an excellent surgeon, but would time his operations at unusual hours so that few observed him. Perhaps for those reasons, he had a small practice.

== Death ==
He died of consumption in 1872. He continued to see patients until four days before his death.
