= Patrick Clarkson =

British surgeon (1911–1969)

Patrick Clarkson MBE FRCS
- Born: 20 February 1911; Christchurch, New Zealand
- Died: 28 December 1969 (aged 58); London, U.K.
- Education: University of Edinburgh; Guy's Hospital Medical School
- Medical career
- Profession: Plastic surgeon
- Field: Surgery of the hand
- Institutions: Guy's Hospital

Patrick Wensley Clarkson, MBE, FRCS (20 February 1911 – 28 December 1969), was a plastic surgeon at Guy's Hospital in London, best known for surgery of the hand and the description of "Poland Syndactyly", later termed Poland syndrome.

Born in New Zealand, he studied medicine at the University of Edinburgh after which he entered Guy's Hospital. His experiences during the Second World War and his training with Sir Harold Gillies in burns and facial injuries led to an internationally acclaimed career in that area. He published extensively in textbooks and journals, lectured widely on burns in children and founded the Hand Club.

== Early life ==
Clarkson was born at Christchurch, New Zealand, on 20 February 1911, the son of a sheep farmer and meat exporter. He received his basic education at Christ's College, New Zealand, subsequently studying medicine at the University of Edinburgh, after which he entered Guy's Hospital Medical School on a scholarship. In 1933, at Guy's, he became an inter-hospital heavy-weight boxing champion. In addition, he represented his medical school at squash rackets.

== Early career ==
Clarkson won the Treasurer's Gold Medal in medicine and surgery and completed the Conjoint Diploma in 1935, subsequently qualifying with the FRCS a year later, and then MBBS in 1940.

He spent 1935 and 1936 at Guy’s doing his house jobs and then becoming a teacher in surgery between 1937 and 1939.

== Second World War ==
In 1940, he joined the Royal Army Medical Corps and two years later was appointed to a training post in plastic surgery under Sir Harold Gillies at Rooksdown House, Basingstoke. His knowledge of the management of burns and facial injuries came from experience at the maxillo-facial unit in North Africa and Italy between 1942 and 1945.

During the final years of the war, he was appointed to the U.S. Army and Navy plastic units, gaining further experience and forming links with American plastic surgeons. For these war time services, he was awarded the MBE.

== Later career ==
After the war, Clarkson was surgeon in-charge of Guy's Hospital accident and emergency and he rejoined Sir Harold Gillies as a plastic surgeon.

In addition, he was appointed as consultant plastic surgeon to St Charles' Hospital, the Royal Northern Hospital and St Mary Abbots Hospital. At the Queen Alexandra Military Hospital and the Cambridge Military Hospital, Aldershot, he became honorary civilian consultant in plastic surgery.

In 1946, Clarkson was Hunterian Professor and Leverhulme Research Scholar at the Royal College of Surgeons, later becoming an FDS examiner.

In 1952, the needs of burned airmen after the war encouraged Clarkson to initiate the establishment of the Hand Club, a precursor idea for the later British Society for Surgery of the Hand. In 1953, after witnessing distressing burns in children, he established the Children's Burns Unit at Guy's.

He published extensively in textbooks and journals, mainly on hand surgery and on the treatment of burns, and developed international recognition for his work. His contributions included the 1962 book The general and plastic surgery of the hand, co-authored with A. D. Pelly.

The American Society for Surgery of the Hand elected him an honorary member and the surgical societies of Brussels, Madrid, and Bordeaux gave him honorary membership. The French and American Societies for Plastic and Reconstructive Surgery elected him an associate member. He became visiting professor of plastic surgery at the Presbyterian Hospital, New York, and the Johns Hopkins Hospital, Baltimore, in 1963 and 1964 respectively.

In 1965, he gave his second Hunterian lecture on the topic of burns in children. In 1968, as president of the Section of Plastic Surgery of the Royal Society of Medicine, he spoke on recent progress in burns as his presidential address.

== Poland syndrome ==
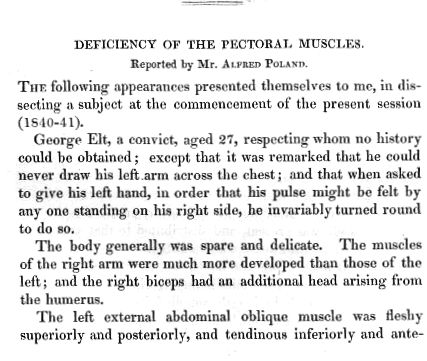
Alfred Poland's original description of the syndrome

Whilst at Guy’s in 1962, Clarkson described three people with breast hypoplasia and joining of fingers. His son later explained how his father discovered the 1841 work of Alfred Poland, an anatomy student at the time who described a body with a hypoplastic webbed hand associated with chest wall deformities. Alfred Poland's friend had made illustrations of the head, neck, and chest anomalies but not the hand. However, Clarkson found the preserved hand in the hospital museum and described it in further detail, subsequently coining the term “Poland syndactyly” in an article in the same journal as Arthur Poland’s original report. Five years later, P. Baudinne and colleagues named the condition "Poland syndrome".

== Later life ==
Clarkson took early retirement due to poor health, but continued to lecture, write and travel. Following a brief illness, he died at Guy's Hospital on 28 December 1969. An address in his memory was given by Sir Hedley Atkins at St Columba's Church, Pont Street, in January 1970.

== Selected publications ==
=== Books ===
- Fifield, Lionel Richard. Infections of the Hand. Editor of second edition. H. K. Lewis & Co. Ltd., London, 1939.
- The General and Plastic Surgery of the Hand, etc. Blackwell Scientific Publications, Oxford, 1962. (With Anthony Pelly)

=== Articles ===
- "Treatment of Jaw and Face Casualties in the British Army", Annals of Surgery, 123 (1946), 190–208.
- "Management and Surgical Resurfacing of Serious Burns", British Journal of Surgery, 1946, 33, 211–23. (with R. S. Lawrie)
- "Facial Injuries in Road Accidents", The Practitioner, 1948, 161, 396–405.
- "Thumb Reconstruction by Transfer of Big Toe", British Medical Journal, 1949, 2, 1334-4. (with R. J. Furlong)
- "Correction of Deformities of the Jaw", Annals of the Royal College of Surgeons of England, 1951, 8, 23–52.
- "Emergency Surgery in the Early Treatment of Burns and Scalds", The Practitioner, 1952, 168, 400.
- "The Care of Open Injuries of the Hand with Special Reference to the Treatment of Traumatic Amputations", Journal of Bone and Joint Surgery, 1955, 37A, 521.
- "Mobilization of the Medial Palm in the Treatment of Distal Hemi-amputation of the Hand", Plastic and Reconstructive Surgery 1961, 28, 56–66.
- "The Aetiology of Dupuytren's disease", Guy's Hospital Reports, 1961, 110, 52.
