= REV1 =

Protein-coding gene in the species Homo sapiens

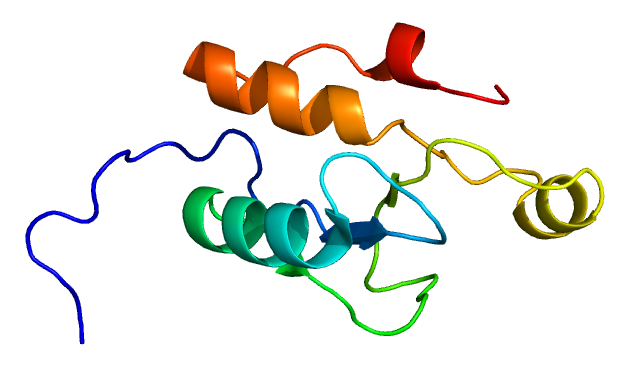

Identifiers
- Aliases: REV1, REV1L, AIBP80, DNA directed polymerase, REV1 DNA directed polymerase
- External IDs: OMIM: 606134; MGI: 1929074; GeneCards: REV1
Available structures
PDB	Ortholog search: PDBe RCSB
PDB	List of PDB id codes 2EBW, 2LSI, 2LSK, 2LSY, 3GQC, 3VU7, 4BA9, 4EXT, 4GK0, 4GK5, 2N1G

Gene location (Human)
Chr.	Chromosome 2 (human)
Band	2q11.2	Start	99,400,475 bp
Band	2q11.2	End	99,490,035 bp

Gene location (Mouse)
Chr.	Chromosome 1 (mouse)
Band	1|1 B	Start	38,052,786 bp
Band	1|1 B	End	38,129,801 bp
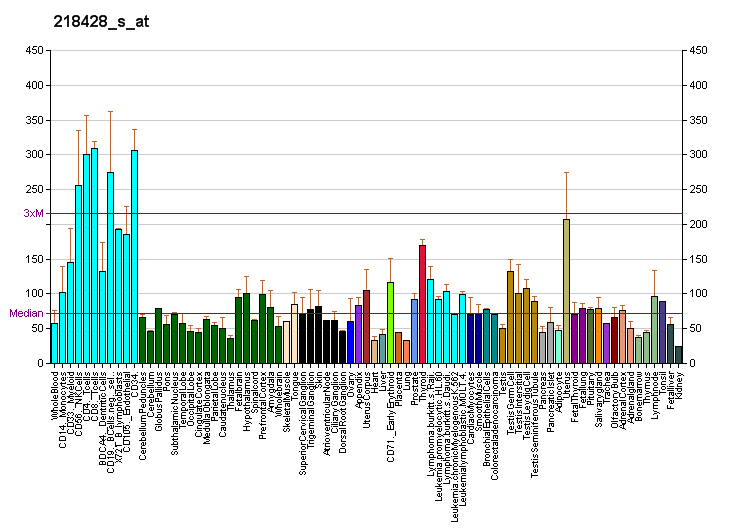
RNA expression pattern
Bgee	Human / Mouse (ortholog); Top expressed in: secondary oocyte; Achilles tendon; cerebellar hemisphere; right hemisphere of cerebellum; right uterine tube; ectocervix; gastric mucosa; body of uterus; skin of abdomen; left ovary / Top expressed in: zygote; secondary oocyte; tail of embryo; superior cervical ganglion; Rostral migratory stream; spermatocyte; lobe of cerebellum; cerebellar vermis; primary oocyte; otic vesicle; More reference expression data
BioGPS	More reference expression data
Gene ontology
Molecular function	transferase activity; damaged DNA binding; DNA binding; nucleotidyltransferase activity; protein binding; metal ion binding; deoxycytidyl transferase activity
Cellular component	nucleus; nucleoplasm
Biological process	DNA replication; translesion synthesis; DNA biosynthetic process; response to UV; error-prone translesion synthesis; cellular response to DNA damage stimulus; DNA repair
Sources:Amigo / QuickGO
Orthologs
Databases	NCBI: entry; OMA: entry
Species	Human	Mouse
Entrez	51455	56210
Ensembl	ENSG00000135945	ENSMUSG00000026082
UniProt	Q9UBZ9	Q920Q2
RefSeq (mRNA)	NM_001037872; NM_016316; NM_001321454; NM_001321455; NM_001321458 NM_001321459; NM_001321460	NM_019570; NM_001359287; NM_001359288
RefSeq (protein)	NP_001032961; NP_001308383; NP_001308384; NP_001308387; NP_001308388 NP_001308389; NP_057400	NP_062516; NP_001346216; NP_001346217
Location (UCSC)	Chr 2: 99.4 – 99.49 Mb	Chr 1: 38.05 – 38.13 Mb
PubMed search
- Wikidata
View/Edit Human	View/Edit Mouse

DNA repair protein REV1 is a protein that in humans is encoded by the REV1 gene.

This gene encodes a protein with similarity to the S. cerevisiae mutagenesis protein Rev1. The Rev1 proteins contain a BRCT domain, which is important in protein-protein interactions. A suggested role for the human Rev1-like protein is as a scaffold that recruits DNA polymerases involved in translesion synthesis (TLS) of damaged DNA. Two alternatively spliced transcript variants that encode different proteins have been found.

Rev1 is a Y family DNA polymerase; it is sometimes referred to as a deoxycytidyl transferase because it only inserts deoxycytidine (dC) across from lesions. Whether G, A, T, C, or an abasic site, Rev1 will always add a C. Rev1 has the ability to always add a C, because it uses an arginine as a template which complements well with C. Yet it is believed that Rev1 rarely uses its polymerase activity; rather it is thought that Rev1's primary role is as a protein landing pad, whereby it helps direct the recruitment of TLS proteins, especially Pol ζ (Rev3/Rev7).

== Interactions ==
REV1 has been shown to interact with MAD2L2. It is believed that Rev1 may interact with PCNA, once ubiquitylated due to a lesion, and help recruit Pol ζ (Rev3/Rev7) a B family polymerase involved in TLS.

== See also ==
- REV3L
