= Lewis Hatchett =

English cricketer

Personal information
- Full name: Lewis James Hatchett
- Born: 21 January 1990 (age 36); Shoreham-by-Sea, Sussex, England
- Batting: Left-handed
- Bowling: Left-arm medium-fast

Domestic team information
- Years: Team
- 2010–2016: Sussex (squad no. 5)
- FC debut: 12 May 2010 Sussex v Cambridge MCCU
- LA debut: 20 May 2013 Sussex v Netherlands

Career statistics
| Competition | FC | LA | T20 |
|---|---|---|---|
| Matches | 27 | 16 | 10 |
| Runs scored | 224 | 9 | 0 |
| Batting average | 9.73 | 4.50 | 0.00 |
| 100s/50s | 0/0 | 0/0 | 0/0 |
| Top score | 25 | 5 | 0* |
| Balls bowled | 4,038 | 670 | 185 |
| Wickets | 72 | 19 | 11 |
| Bowling average | 35.08 | 33.15 | 27.63 |
| 5 wickets in innings | 3 | 0 | 0 |
| 10 wickets in match | 0 | 0 | 0 |
| Best bowling | 5/47 | 3/44 | 3/23 |
| Catches/stumpings | 10/– | 5/– | 0/– |
- Source: CricketArchive, 12 June 2016

Lewis James Hatchett (born 21 January 1990) is an English former cricketer. Hatchett is a left-handed batsman who bowls left-arm medium-fast. He was born at Shoreham-by-Sea, Sussex, and was educated at Steyning Grammar School. He was born with Poland syndrome, meaning that he was born without a right pectoral muscle and two ribs.

Hatchett made his first-class debut for Sussex against Cambridge MCCU at Fenner's in May 2010. He claimed his maiden first-class wickets during the match, with the wickets of Stephen Gray and Anand Ashok in Cambridge MCCU's first-innings and Rob Woolley and Peter Turnbull in their second-innings. In July 2010, he made two appearances in the County Championship against Middlesex and Leicestershire. It was against Leicestershire that he claimed his maiden five wicket haul, with figures of 5/47 in Leicestershire's first-innings. He made one further appearance in that season's County Championship, against Worcestershire. At the end of that season, he signed a three-year contract with Sussex, with coach Mark Davis stating "He's an exciting prospect, a left-armer who swings the ball and he's destined for a long and successful career."

When not on Sussex duty, Lewis has played club cricket for East Grinstead Cricket Club in West Sussex, since 2009.

He made just one first-class appearance in 2011, against Oxford MCCU at the University Parks; he again made a single first-class appearance the following year, against Surrey in the County Championship at The Oval.

In September 2016 he retired from cricket following medical advice.
