= Jaime Jarrín =

Ecuadorian-American radio sportscaster (born 1933)

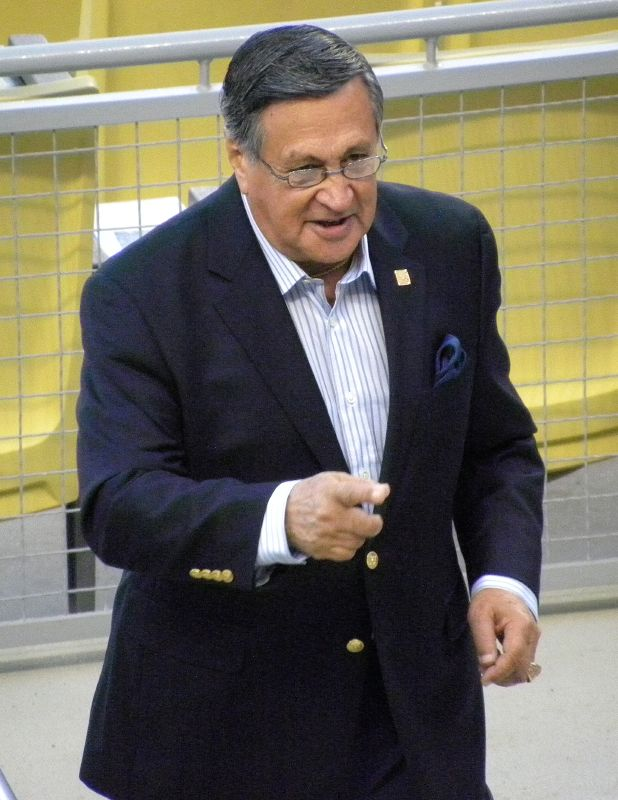
- Jarrín at Game 1 of the 2009 NLDS
- Born: December 10, 1933 (age 92); Cayambe, Ecuador
- Awards: Los Angeles Dodgers "microphone" retired (2018); Ford C. Frick Award (1998)
- Sports commentary career
- Team: Los Angeles Dodgers
- Genre: Play-by-play
- Sports: Major League Baseball; Boxing

Jaime Jarrín (Spanish pronunciation: [ˈxajme xaˈrin]; born December 10, 1933) is an Ecuadorian-born American former sportscaster known as the Spanish-language voice of the Los Angeles Dodgers. He began broadcasting for the Dodgers in 1959 and was the 1998 recipient of the Ford C. Frick Award from the Baseball Hall of Fame. One of the most recognizable voices in Hispanic broadcasting, Jarrín, "the Spanish Voice of the Dodgers" is also heard on Spectrum SportsNet LA's SAP channel.

== Career ==
Born in Cayambe, Ecuador, Jarrín began work as a broadcaster in his home country in 1948, when he was just 15 years old. He went on to become the announcer for the National Congress of Ecuador. He came to the United States on June 24, 1955. At the time, he had never seen a baseball game.

=== Los Angeles Dodgers (1959–2022) ===
When the Dodgers moved to Los Angeles in 1958, KWKW (1300 AM) was enlisted by team owner Walter O'Malley to be the team's Spanish-language flagship station; Jarrín was KWKW news and sports director, having joined the station as a news reporter in 1955. The original broadcast team included René Cárdenas, Miguel Alonso, and Milt Nava, and they were joined by Jarrín starting with the 1959 season. For the first six years, they did not travel with the team but would recreate the games on radio while listening to the English-language broadcast in a studio. In 1973, after 14 years with the Dodgers, Jarrín became the club's number-one Spanish-language broadcaster. (KWKW moved from 1300 AM to the 1330 AM frequency in 1989.)

From 1962 to 1984, Jarrín never missed a game, calling close to 4,000 games over 22 seasons. The streak was broken only when he took charge of all the Spanish-language radio coverage and production for the 1984 Summer Olympics in Los Angeles.

During 1980–81, Jarrín, Rene Cardenas, Miguel Alonso, and Rodolfo Hoyos Jr. served as interpreter for Mexican pitcher Fernando Valenzuela. Valenzuela would later work as color commentator alongside Jarrín and Pepe Yñiguez on Dodgers games.

He has called more than 30 world championship boxing title bouts throughout the world for radio and television stations in Latin America, including the Thrilla in Manila between Muhammad Ali and Joe Frazier. He has called 25 All-Star Games and 25 World Series, including the 2005 Fall Classic in which he served as the emcee for MLB's Latin Legends ceremony. His broadcasts of the All-Star Game, League Championship Series and World Series on CBS, the Latina Broadcasting Network, Cadena Latina and Caracol and 1989 to 1999 were carried on more than 300 stations. In March 2006, Jarrín served as a play-by-play announcer for the inaugural World Baseball Classic.

In addition to his work for the Dodgers, Jarrín continued to cover major news events for KWKW including the Chicano Moratorium of 1970, memorial services for President John F. Kennedy and Pope John Paul II's first pastoral visit to the United States, along with several important meetings between foreign leaders and Presidents Richard Nixon and Lyndon B. Johnson.

For the 2015 season, Jarrín was paired for the first time in the booth with his son Jorge Jarrín. With the retirement of fellow Dodgers broadcaster Vin Scully in 2016, Jarrín became the longest tenured active broadcaster in baseball on April 7, 2017.

On September 28, 2021, Jarrín announced he would retire after the 2022 season. At 64 total seasons, all with the Dodgers, he ends his career as the third-longest-tenured individual with one team (behind Scully, 67 years, and Tommy Lasorda, 69 years, both also entirely with the Dodgers).

== Honors and awards ==
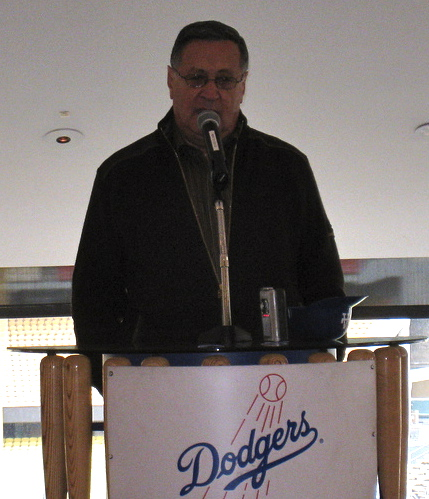
Jarrín speaking in 2008

In 1998, Jarrín received the Ford C. Frick Award from the Baseball Hall of Fame, becoming the second Spanish-language broadcaster to win that award, joining Mets and Yankees announcer Buck Canel. In February 1998, Jarrín was the first recipient of the Southern California Broadcaster Association's President's Award. Also in 1998, he was honored by the National Association of Hispanic Journalists with their highest award, and received a star on the Hollywood Walk of Fame.

In 2002, Jarrín was inducted into the California Broadcasters Association Hall of Fame and in 2003, into the Hispanic Heritage Baseball Museum Hall of Fame. He received the 2003 Foreign Language Sports Broadcaster Award from the Southern California Sports Broadcasters and was inducted into the Southern California Sports Broadcaster's Hall of Fame. Jarrín was honored again by the SCSB with the foreign-language broadcaster of the year award in 2003, 2004, 2005, 2007 and 2008. In 2009, he was honored by the Society of St. Vincent DePaul for his commitment to changing the lives of at-risk youth in the community.

He has also received La Gran Cruz al Merito en El Grado de Comendador (the highest civilian medal) from his native Ecuador in January 1992. In 1990 he was named as one of the top 100 Influential Hispanics in the United States by Hispanic Business Magazine. In 1970, he was the first Latin American to win the Golden Mike Award, which he received again in 1971. In 2000, he spoke at the MLB Rookie Development seminar, which is designed to prepare top minor league prospects for the Major Leagues.

In 2011, Jarrín was honored in Los Angeles with the AFTRA Foundation's AFTRA Media and Entertainment Excellence Award in Broadcasting. His colleague, Vin Scully, received the same award in 2009.

On June 11, 2012, the Dodgers prior to their game against the Angels honored Jarrín for 54 years of service. He was given a trophy and threw out the first pitch of the game. A video tribute was also made and shown. The fans also received a blue colored T-shirt where the front of the shirt said "Se Va, Se Va, Se Va"

== Personal life ==
Jarrín studied philosophy, letters, journalism, and broadcasting at Central University of Ecuador in Quito. His son, Jorge, started as a traffic reporter for English and Spanish radio stations in Los Angeles before joining the Dodgers broadcast team.

Jarrín resides in San Marino, California. His wife, Blanca, died on February 28, 2019.
