= Jorge Jarrín =

American sports broadcaster

Jorge Jarrin
- Born: Quito, Ecuador
- Sports commentary career
- Team: Los Angeles Dodgers
- Genre: Color commentator
- Sport: Major League Baseball

Jorge Jarrín is a sports broadcaster, who previously worked Spanish language radio for the Los Angeles Dodgers. He was a Los Angeles traffic reporter for radio station KABC. He was the helicopter reporter in "Jet Copter 790" from 1985 to 2011, earning the nickname "Captain Jorge." Jorge also broadcast traffic reports on Spanish KSKQ. On October 26, 2011, Jorge was let go, one of 27 KABC/KLOS employees to lose their jobs after Cumulus Media took over those stations from Citadel Broadcasting.

== Career ==
Jarrín graduated with a B.A. in theater arts from Pepperdine University in 1979.

Jarrín is the son of Jaime Jarrín, a radio sportscaster who has broadcast for the Dodgers in Spanish since 1958. Honored by the Associated Press for his coverage of the 1992 Los Angeles riots, Jorge has followed in his father's footsteps, winning the prestigious Golden Mike Award for broadcasting excellence.

=== Los Angeles Dodgers (2012-2020) ===
Beginning in 2012, Jarrín was teamed with former Los Angeles Dodgers left fielder Manny Mota, doing Spanish-language telecasts of Dodgers games for Fox Deportes. He also co-hosted the Dodger Talk radio post-game show on KLAC along with Kevin Kennedy and David Vassegh. When the Dodgers started SportsNet LA in 2014, he and Mota called select games on the Spanish-language feed. In 2015, he was teamed with his father on the Dodgers radio broadcasts on KTNQ. He stepped down from his role with the Dodgers after the 2020 season.
