= MAD2L2 =

Protein-coding gene in humans

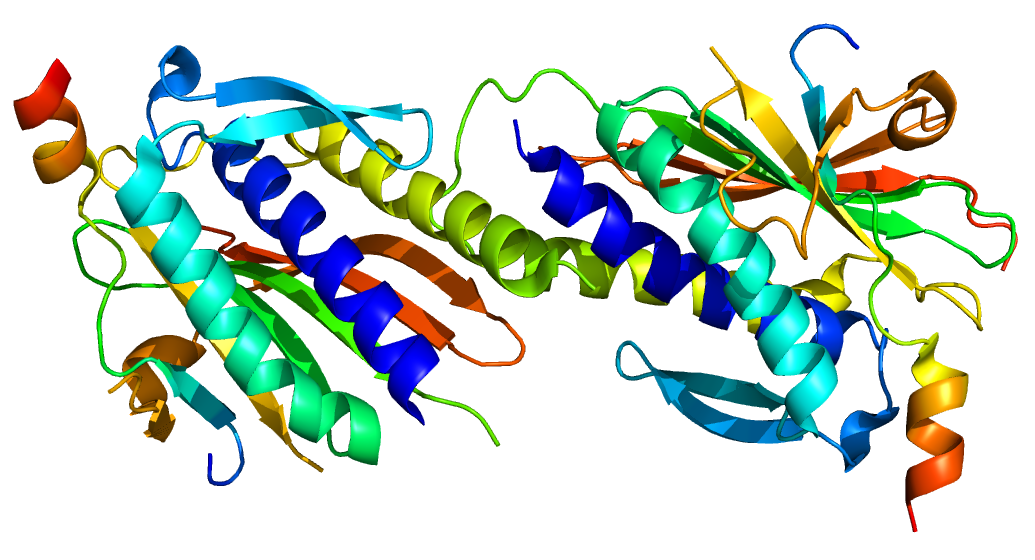

Identifiers
- Aliases: MAD2L2, MAD2B, POLZ2, REV7, MAD2 mitotic arrest deficient-like 2 (yeast), mitotic arrest deficient 2 like 2, FANCV
- External IDs: OMIM: 604094; MGI: 1919140; GeneCards: MAD2L2
Available structures
PDB	Ortholog search: PDBe RCSB
PDB	List of PDB id codes 3ABD, 3ABE, 3VU7, 4EXT, 4GK0, 4GK5

Gene location (Human)
Chr.	Chromosome 1 (human)
Band	1p36.22	Start	11,674,480 bp
Band	1p36.22	End	11,691,650 bp

Gene location (Mouse)
Chr.	Chromosome 4 (mouse)
Band	4|4 E2	Start	148,130,384 bp
Band	4|4 E2	End	148,145,699 bp
RNA expression pattern
Bgee	Human / Mouse (ortholog); Top expressed in: ganglionic eminence; left testis; right testis; granulocyte; gastrocnemius muscle; stromal cell of endometrium; ventricular zone; muscle of thigh; right lobe of liver; body of pancreas / Top expressed in: genital tubercle; seminiferous tubule; tail of embryo; spermatocyte; zygote; ventricular zone; morula; secondary oocyte; external carotid artery; neural tube; More reference expression data
BioGPS	n/a
Gene ontology
Molecular function	JUN kinase binding; protein binding
Cellular component	cytoplasm; spindle; nucleoplasm; zeta DNA polymerase complex; anaphase-promoting complex; cytoskeleton; nucleus; nucleolus; cytosol; chromosome; site of double-strand break
Biological process	DNA damage response, signal transduction resulting in transcription; regulation of transcription, DNA-templated; negative regulation of protein catabolic process; actin filament organization; negative regulation of cell-cell adhesion mediated by cadherin; negative regulation of transcription by competitive promoter binding; negative regulation of transcription by RNA polymerase II; negative regulation of DNA-binding transcription factor activity; transcription, DNA-templated; mitotic spindle assembly checkpoint signaling; positive regulation of peptidyl-serine phosphorylation; error-prone translesion synthesis; cellular response to DNA damage stimulus; cell division; positive regulation of transcription, DNA-templated; negative regulation of transcription regulatory region DNA binding; double-strand break repair; regulation of cell growth; cell cycle; negative regulation of canonical Wnt signaling pathway; negative regulation of epithelial to mesenchymal transition; negative regulation of ubiquitin protein ligase activity; DNA repair; positive regulation of isotype switching; negative regulation of double-strand break repair via homologous recombination; positive regulation of double-strand break repair via nonhomologous end joining
Sources:Amigo / QuickGO
Orthologs
Databases	NCBI: entry; OMA: entry
Species	Human	Mouse
Entrez	10459	71890
Ensembl	ENSG00000116670	ENSMUSG00000029003
UniProt	Q9UI95	Q9D752
RefSeq (mRNA)	NM_001127325; NM_006341	NM_027985; NM_001305420
RefSeq (protein)	NP_001120797; NP_006332	NP_001292349; NP_082261
Location (UCSC)	Chr 1: 11.67 – 11.69 Mb	Chr 4: 148.13 – 148.15 Mb
PubMed search
- Wikidata
View/Edit Human	View/Edit Mouse

Mitotic spindle assembly checkpoint protein MAD2B is a protein that in humans is encoded by the MAD2L2 gene.

== Function ==
MAD2L2 is a component of the mitotic spindle assembly checkpoint that prevents the onset of anaphase until all chromosomes are properly aligned at the metaphase plate. MAD2L2 is a homolog of MAD2L1.

== Interactions ==
MAD2L2 has been shown to interact with:

- ADAM9,
- MAD2L1,
- REV1, and
- REV3L.
