= REV3L =

Protein-coding gene in the species Homo sapiens

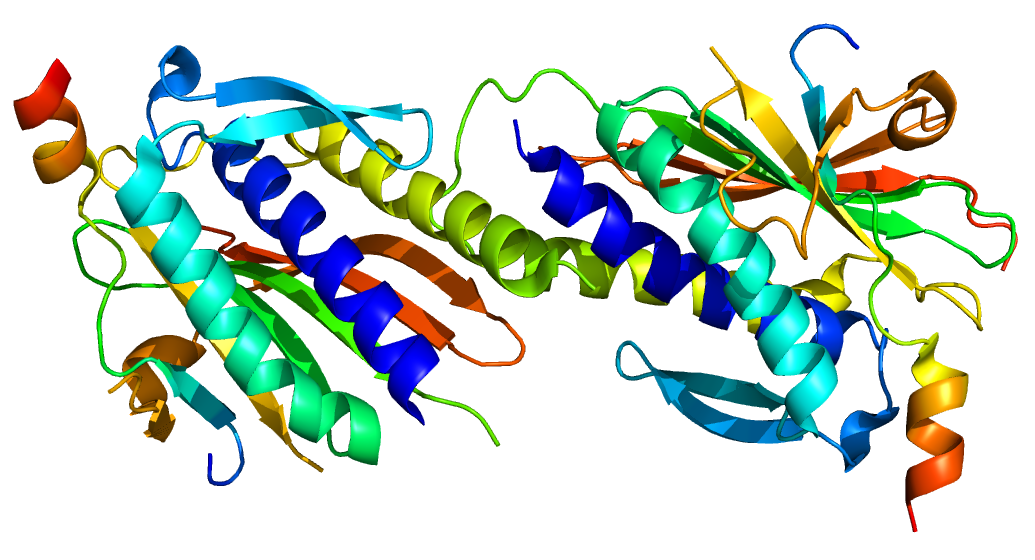

Identifiers
- Aliases: REV3L, POLZ, REV3, REV3 like, DNA directed polymerase zeta catalytic subunit
- External IDs: OMIM: 602776; MGI: 1337131; GeneCards: REV3L
Available structures
PDB	Ortholog search: PDBe RCSB
PDB	List of PDB id codes 3ABD, 3ABE, 3VU7, 4EXT, 4GK0, 4GK5
Enzyme activity
EC #	BRENDA	ExPASy	KEGG	MetaCyc
2.7.7.7	↗	↗	↗	↗

Gene location (Human)
Chr.	Chromosome 6 (human)
Band	6q21	Start	111,299,028 bp
Band	6q21	End	111,483,715 bp

Gene location (Mouse)
Chr.	Chromosome 10 (mouse)
Band	10|10 B1	Start	39,608,114 bp
Band	10|10 B1	End	39,751,207 bp
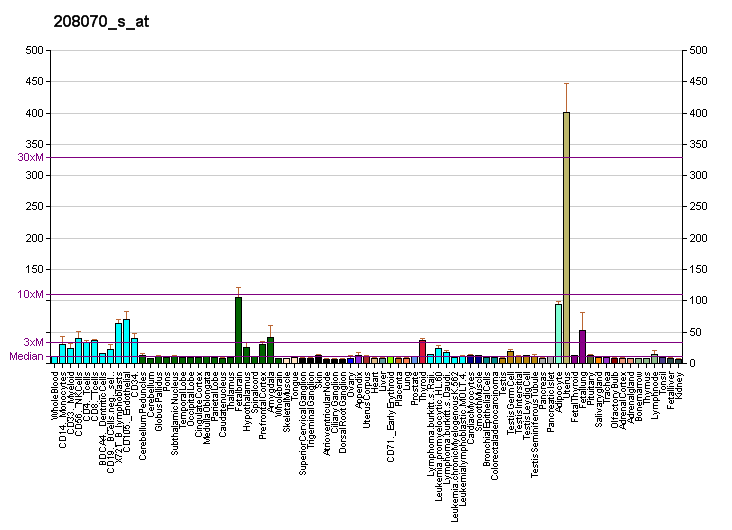
RNA expression pattern
Bgee	Human / Mouse (ortholog); Top expressed in: Achilles tendon; skin of hip; endometrium; body of uterus; myometrium; synovial joint; testicle; canal of the cervix; tail of epididymis; skin of thigh / Top expressed in: ciliary body; pineal gland; vestibular sensory epithelium; barrel cortex; Rostral migratory stream; iris; retinal pigment epithelium; vas deferens; conjunctival fornix; human fetus; More reference expression data
BioGPS	More reference expression data
Gene ontology
Molecular function	transferase activity; nucleotide binding; DNA binding; 4 iron, 4 sulfur cluster binding; nucleotidyltransferase activity; iron-sulfur cluster binding; metal ion binding; protein binding; nucleic acid binding; DNA-directed DNA polymerase activity; 3'-5' exonuclease activity
Cellular component	nucleoplasm; nucleolus; nucleus; zeta DNA polymerase complex
Biological process	DNA-dependent DNA replication; error-prone translesion synthesis; cellular response to DNA damage stimulus; DNA replication; DNA repair; translesion synthesis; nucleic acid phosphodiester bond hydrolysis
Sources:Amigo / QuickGO
Orthologs
Databases	NCBI: entry; OMA: entry
Species	Human	Mouse
Entrez	5980	19714
Ensembl	ENSG00000009413	ENSMUSG00000019841
UniProt	O60673	Q61493
RefSeq (mRNA)	NM_001286431; NM_001286432; NM_002912; NM_001372078	NM_011264
RefSeq (protein)	NP_001273360; NP_001273361; NP_002903; NP_001359007	NP_035394
Location (UCSC)	Chr 6: 111.3 – 111.48 Mb	Chr 10: 39.61 – 39.75 Mb
PubMed search
- Wikidata
View/Edit Human	View/Edit Mouse

Protein reversionless 3-like (REV3L) also known as DNA polymerase zeta catalytic subunit (POLZ) is an enzyme that in humans is encoded by the REV3L gene.

The Rev3 subunit interacts with Rev7 to form Pol ζ, a B family polymerase. Pol ζ lacks 3' to 5' exonuclease activity and is a moderate fidelity polymerase. It cannot add nucleotides across from DNA lesions, yet it can extend from primers with terminal mismatches. This makes Pol ζ very important in translesion synthesis (TLS), because it can act in concert with other TLS polymerases that can add across the lesion to complete the bypass of the lesion. Most polymerases have difficulty extending mismatches because they cannot bind properly to the mismatched DNA. So rather than the cell dying, it can survive albeit with a mutation that may or may not be deleterious, so it is believed that Pol ζ is a driving force of evolution.

== Interactions ==
REV3L has been shown to interact with MAD2L2.

== See also ==
- REV1
