= Austin Barnes =

American baseball player (born 1989)

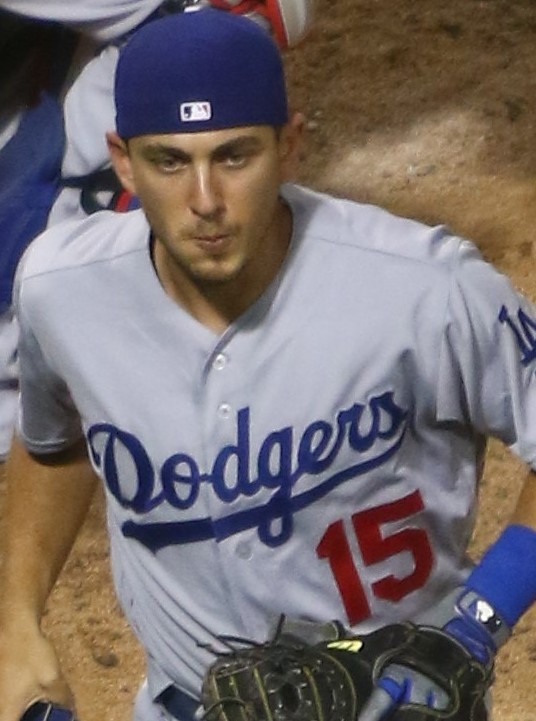
- Barnes with the Los Angeles Dodgers in 2017

Free agent
- Catcher
- Born: December 28, 1989 (age 36); Riverside, California, U.S.
- Bats: Right Throws: Right

MLB debut
- May 24, 2015, for the Los Angeles Dodgers

MLB statistics (through 2025 season)
- Batting average: .223
- Home runs: 35
- Runs batted in: 162
- Stats at Baseball Reference

Teams
- Los Angeles Dodgers (2015–2025)

Career highlights and awards
- 2× World Series champion (2020, 2024)
Medals
Men's baseball
Representing Mexico
World Baseball Classic
Bronze medal – third place	2023 Miami	Team

Austin Scott Barnes (born December 28, 1989) is an American professional baseball catcher who is a free agent. He has previously played in Major League Baseball (MLB) for the Los Angeles Dodgers. He played college baseball for the Arizona State Sun Devils. Barnes was selected by the Florida Marlins in the eighth round of the 2011 MLB draft. He made his MLB debut with the Dodgers in 2015 and helped the team win the 2020 and 2024 World Series. He has also played for the Mexico national baseball team.

== Early life ==
Barnes was born on December 28, 1989, in Riverside, California, the oldest of four children born to Dennis and Stephanie Barnes. Although his mother is Mexican-American, he was raised speaking only English. His maternal uncle, Mike Gallego, played in Major League Baseball (MLB) for the Oakland Athletics. He began playing baseball at a young age. As a shortstop in Little League Baseball, Barnes' nickname was "Hoover", given for his ability to field ground balls.

He attended Riverside Polytechnic High School, playing on the same baseball team as future Houston Astros outfielder Jake Marisnick. He received four varsity letters from Riverside Poly, and served as team captain his senior year. As a junior in 2007, Barnes had a batting average of .450, which he improved to .478 as a senior. Outside of his high school team, Barnes played on travel teams and in a summer league, which he helped take to the American Amateur Baseball Congress (AABC) Don Mattingly Championship in 2017.

== College career ==
After graduating from Riverside Poly, Barnes attended Arizona State University to play college baseball. He largely did not play during his freshman season. He appeared in 20 games as a catcher and second baseman, with one start as a designated hitter. In only 17 at bats, Barnes totaled seven hits for a .412 average.

Things began to change for Barnes as a sophomore. After catchers Xorge Carrillo and Andrew Pollak both suffered injuries during Barnes' sophomore season, he was called behind the plate. Barnes adapted to the new position quickly, with 19 of the first 24 baserunners he faced caught stealing. He also improved his batting, finishing the season with a .272 average. He started in 48 games, 43 of which were behind the plate, and registered a .985 fielding percentage in his first season as a full-time catcher.

In 2010, he played summer league baseball for the St. Cloud River Bats of the Northwoods League.

Barnes was given an opportunity to return to the infield for his junior season, but he elected to remain the team's catcher. His first home run of the season came on March 27, 2011, in the seventh inning of an 8-1 victory over Arizona. As the team's starting catcher, Barnes played in 43 games in 2011, starting in 41, and boasted a .994 fielding percentage and .320 batting average, with 27 runs and 15 runs batted in (RBIs). He was also named to the All-Pac-10 First Team upon the conclusion of the season.

== Professional career ==
=== Miami Marlins ===
The Miami Marlins drafted Barnes in the ninth round of the 2011 MLB draft. He made his professional debut that season with the Low-A Jamestown Jammers of the New York–Penn League, establishing himself early on as both a passionate catcher and a strong batter.

From 2012 to 2014, Barnes played for the Single-A Greensboro Grasshoppers, High-A Jupiter Hammerheads, and Double-A Jacksonville Suns. He split time between catcher and second base.

=== Los Angeles Dodgers ===
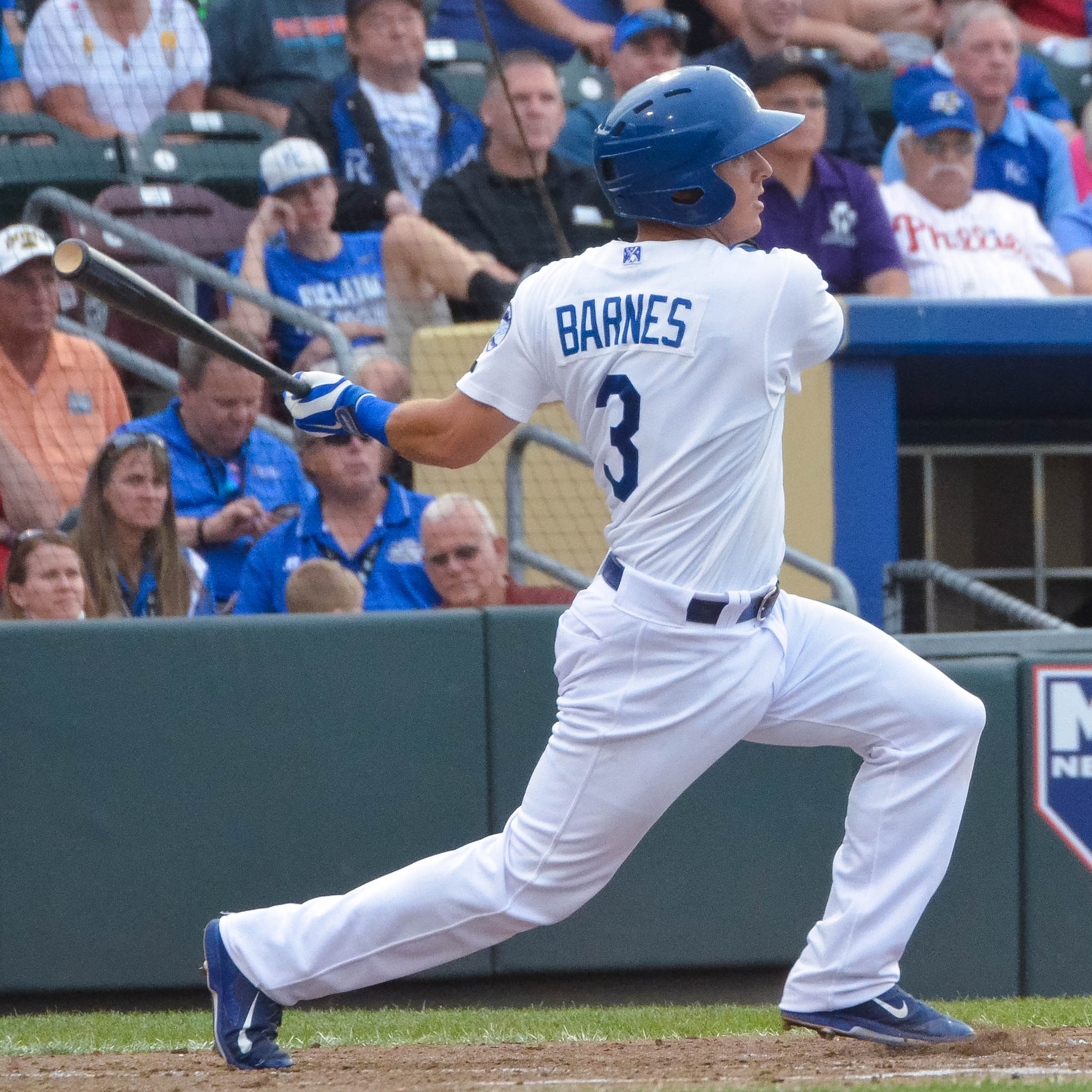
Barnes with the Oklahoma City Dodgers at the 2015 Triple-A All-Star Game

On December 10, 2014, Barnes was traded to the Los Angeles Dodgers, along with Chris Hatcher, Andrew Heaney, and Enrique Hernández, in exchange for Dan Haren, Dee Gordon, Miguel Rojas and cash. He was assigned to the Triple-A Oklahoma City Dodgers. On May 23, 2015, he was called up to the Major Leagues for the first time when Yasmani Grandal went on the 7-day disabled list with a concussion.

Barnes made his MLB debut as the starting catcher for the Dodgers on May 24, 2015, originally wearing number 65. He had one hit in three at-bats in his debut, with his first MLB hit being a single to center field off of Dale Thayer of the San Diego Padres. He returned to Oklahoma City after his short time on the Dodgers roster and was named as a starter on the Pacific Coast League team for the mid-season Triple-A All-Star game. He was also named to the post-season PCL all-star team and Baseball America's Triple-A All-Star team. He rejoined the Dodgers in September. He played in 20 games for the Dodgers with six hits in 29 at-bats (.207). In 81 games for the Oklahoma City team, he hit .315 with nine homers and 42 RBI.

Barnes appeared in 21 games for the Dodgers in 2016, hitting .156, and 85 games for Oklahoma City, hitting .295. He changed his number from 65 to 28. He also appeared in two games in the 2016 National League Division Series against the Washington Nationals, with one pinch hit appearance and one pinch run appearance.

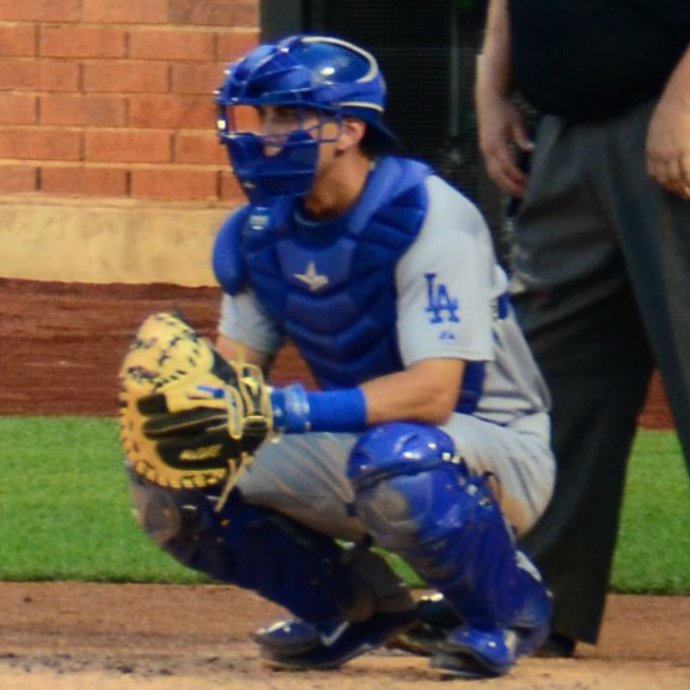
Barnes with the Los Angeles Dodgers in 2015

Barnes made the Opening Day roster as the backup catcher in 2017. On June 30, 2017, he recorded his first multi-homer game of his career (his first career grand slam and a three-run home run) and recorded a career-high seven RBIs against the San Diego Padres. He gradually saw more playing time, moving into a platoon role with Grandal for most of the season before taking over as the starter in the playoffs. During the regular season, he had a .289 batting average with eight home runs and 38 RBI in 102 games. In the 2017 NLDS Barnes had four hits in eight at-bats with a home run and a double in the Dodgers' three-game sweep of the Arizona Diamondbacks. In the 2017 NLCS against the Chicago Cubs, he had two hits in 15 at-bats, and in the 2017 World Series against the Houston Astros, he had four hits in 23 at-bats.

In 2018, Barnes started spring training battling elbow discomfort. He ended up being the backup to Yasmani Grandal, taking over the catching role more in the postseason when Grandal allowed two passed balls and made two errors in game 1 of the NLCS and another passed ball in game 3, resulting in Dodgers fans booing him and begging for Barnes to catch. Barnes hit .205/.329/.290 in 100 games with 4 home runs, 41 hits, and 14 RBI. An elite framer, he excelled defensively. He ranked third in the MLB for framing and defensive statistics, had a .993 fielding percentage, and allowed only one passed ball. In the 2018 NLCS against the Milwaukee Brewers, Barnes had two hits in 18 at-bats. In the 2018 World Series against the Boston Red Sox, he was hitless in eleven at-bats.

In 2019, Barnes was named the Opening Day starting catcher after Grandal signed with the Milwaukee Brewers. However, he got off to a slow start and on July 26 he was sent down to Oklahoma City to make room for rookie catcher Will Smith to take over the everyday catching duties. Barnes was batting .196 prior to being sent down. He appeared in only 75 games in the majors in 2019, hitting .203/.293/.340 with five home runs and 25 RBIs, while he hit .264 in 23 games in the minor leagues. Barnes signed a one-year, $1.1 million contract with the Dodgers after the season, avoiding arbitration.

During the pandemic-shortened 2020 season, Barnes appeared in 29 games for the Dodgers, hitting .244/.353/.314 with one homer and nine RBIs. He had two hits in three at-bats in the Wild Card Series, two hits in two at-bats in the NLDS and two hits in seven at-bats in the NLCS. In the 2020 World Series against the Tampa Bay Rays, he had two hits in 13 at-bats. In Game 3, he drove in a run with a safety squeeze and also hit a home run, becoming only the second player to do both of those things in the same World Series game, joining Héctor López in 1961. The Dodgers won the World Series in six games with Barnes catching the final out with Julio Urias closing the game.

On February 15, 2021, Barnes signed a new two-year, $4.3 million contract with the Dodgers to avoid salary arbitration. He again was the back-up catcher behind Will Smith, appearing in 77 games and hitting .215 with six homers and 23 RBI. He had three appearances, all as a pinch hitter, in the playoffs, striking out in two of the three at-bats.

On July 3, 2022, Barnes and the Dodgers signed a two-year contract extension worth $7 million. In 62 games in 2022, he hit .212 with eight homers and 26 RBIs. In 2023, he played in 59 games, with a .180 batting average. In 2024, he played in 54 games with a .264 average. While Barnes was active for the entire postseason in 2024, he only made one appearance, as a defensive replacement in the NLCS, as the Dodgers won the 2024 World Series title. It was the first time since 2019 that he did not have an at-bat in the postseason. After the season, the Dodgers picked up his $3.25 million contract option for the 2025 season.

Barnes appeared in 13 games for the Dodgers in 2025, batting .214/.233/.286 with two RBI. He was designated for assignment by the team on May 14 and released on May 20.

=== San Francisco Giants ===
On June 29, 2025, Barnes signed a minor league contract with the San Francisco Giants. In 13 appearances split between the rookie-level Arizona Complex League Giants and Triple-A Sacramento River Cats, he went 8-for-39 (.205) with two RBI. Barnes was released by the Giants organization on August 1.

=== New York Mets ===
On January 29, 2026, Barnes signed a minor league contract with the New York Mets. He was released by the Mets on March 25, after failing to make the team's Opening Day roster.

== Personal life ==
Barnes is the nephew of former MLB infielder Mike Gallego. His younger brother, Griffin, played catcher for Grand Canyon University and signed with the Los Angeles Angels.

Barnes married Nicole Breanna Rappaport in 2018. The couple lives in Glendale, California, a suburb of Los Angeles close to Dodger Stadium. They have one son.

Although Barnes' childhood nickname was "Hoover", it is now "Barnsey". He also picked up the nickname "Sam" from Chase Utley.
