= 2020 World Series =

116th edition of Major League Baseball's championship series

Team (Wins)	Managers	Season
Los Angeles Dodgers (4)	Dave Roberts	43–17 (.717), GA: 6
Tampa Bay Rays (2)	Kevin Cash	40–20 (.667), GA: 7
- Dates: October 20–27
- Venue: Globe Life Field
- MVP: Corey Seager (Los Angeles)
- Umpires: Bill Miller (crew chief), Jerry Meals, Mark Carlson, Laz Díaz, Chris Guccione, Marvin Hudson, Todd Tichenor

Broadcast
- Television: Fox (United States – English); Fox Deportes (United States – Spanish); MLB International (International)
- TV announcers: Joe Buck, John Smoltz, Ken Rosenthal and Tom Verducci (Fox); Adrian Garcia Marquez, Rolando Nichols, Edgar Gonzalez, Carlos Álvarez and Jaime Motta (Fox Deportes); Matt Vasgersian and Buck Martinez (MLB International)
- Radio: ESPN (United States – English); WDAE (TB – English); WGES (TB – Spanish); KLAC (LAD – English); KTNQ (LAD – Spanish); KMPC (LAD – Korean)
- Radio announcers: Dan Shulman, Chris Singleton, Jessica Mendoza and Buster Olney (ESPN); Andy Freed and Dave Wills (WDAE); Ricardo Taveras and Enrique Oliu (WGES); Charley Steiner and Rick Monday (KLAC); Jaime Jarrín and Jorge Jarrín (KTNQ); Richard Choi and Chong Ho Yim (KMPC)
- ALCS: Tampa Bay Rays over Houston Astros (4–3)
- NLCS: Los Angeles Dodgers over Atlanta Braves (4–3)

The 2020 World Series was the championship series of Major League Baseball's (MLB) 2020 season. The 116th edition of the World Series, it was a best-of-seven playoff between the American League (AL) champion Tampa Bay Rays and the National League (NL) champion Los Angeles Dodgers. The Dodgers defeated the Rays to win the series in six games for their first championship since 1988.

Due to the COVID-19 pandemic, the entire series was played at Globe Life Field in Arlington, Texas, from October 20 to October 27, with the ballpark's seating capacity limited to 25 percent (11,500 fans). The pandemic resulted in the regular season being reduced to 60 games and the postseason being held at neutral sites instead of teams' home stadiums. This was the first World Series to be played at a neutral site, as well as the first since 1944 to be held at only one ballpark. It was the first World Series since 1993 to be played entirely on artificial turf, fifth all-artificial-turf World Series, and first World Series played entirely on second-generation artificial turf. It was also the first World Series since 1984 to use the designated hitter in all games. As 2020 was Globe Life Field's inaugural season, it became the first ballpark to host the World Series in its first year since Yankee Stadium in 2009.

Despite not playing on their home field, the Dodgers were still designated as having home-field advantage because they had the better regular-season record. Los Angeles and Tampa Bay alternated victories during the first four games before the Dodgers won Games 5 and 6, becoming the first designated "home" team to win the World Series since 2013. Los Angeles shortstop Corey Seager was named the World Series Most Valuable Player (MVP) after batting 8-for-20 (.400), with two home runs, five runs batted in, and an on-base percentage of .556.

== Background ==
=== Impact of the COVID-19 pandemic ===
Due to the COVID-19 pandemic, Major League Baseball (MLB) and the MLB Players Association (MLBPA) agreed to shorten the standard 162-game season to 60 games, the shortest since 1878. They also agreed to hold an expanded 16-team playoff tournament for only the 2020 season. In addition to each league's three division winners, each league's three division runners-up qualified, and two additional wild card teams per league qualified based on win–loss record. The first round was the Wild Card Series, a best-of-three playoff hosted by the higher seeded team. After that, the postseason maintained its standard format of the best-of-five League Division Series, best-of-seven League Championship Series, and best-of-seven World Series.

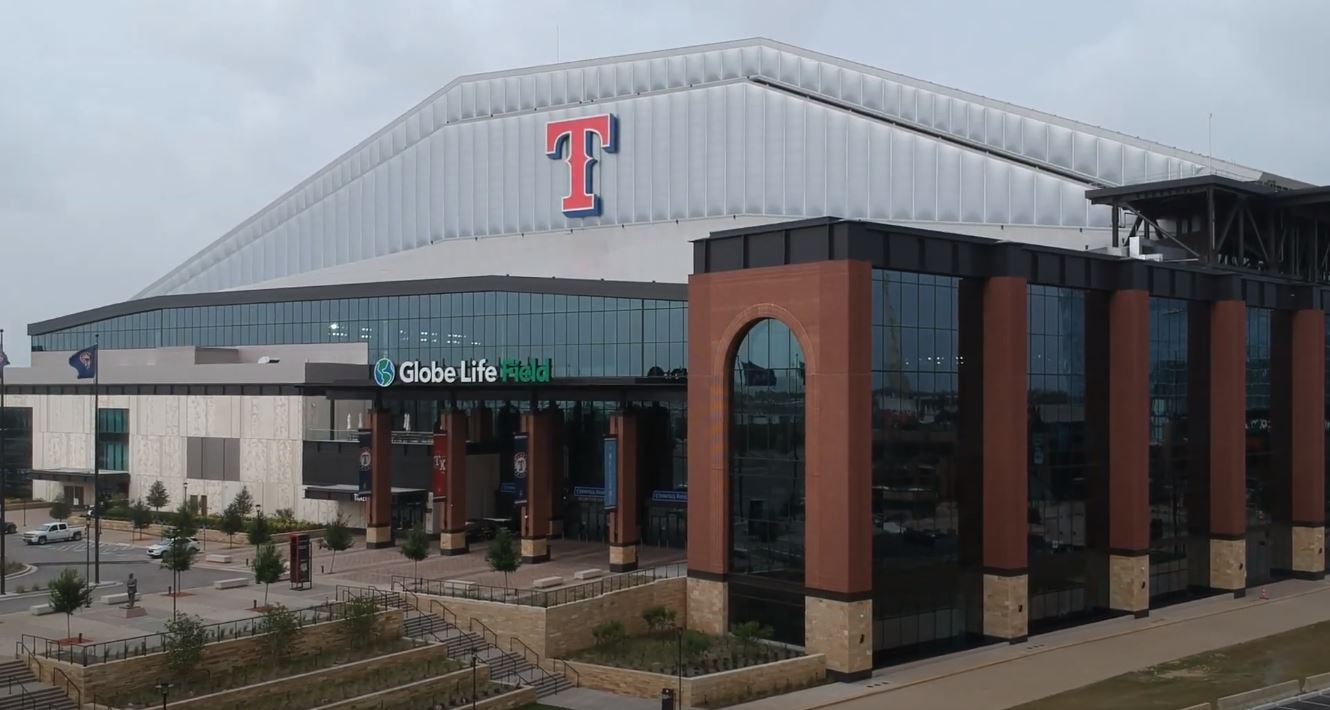
Globe Life Field

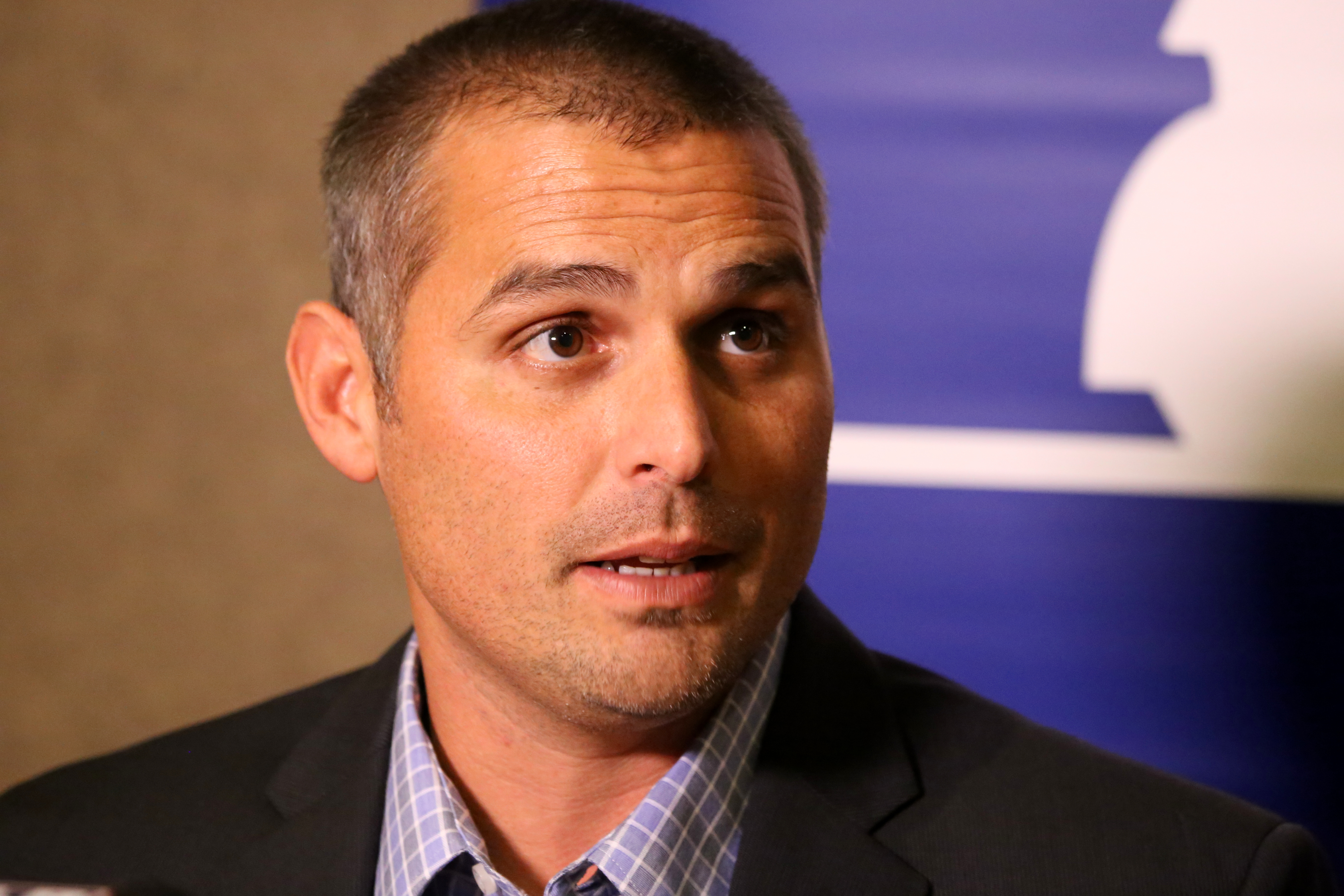
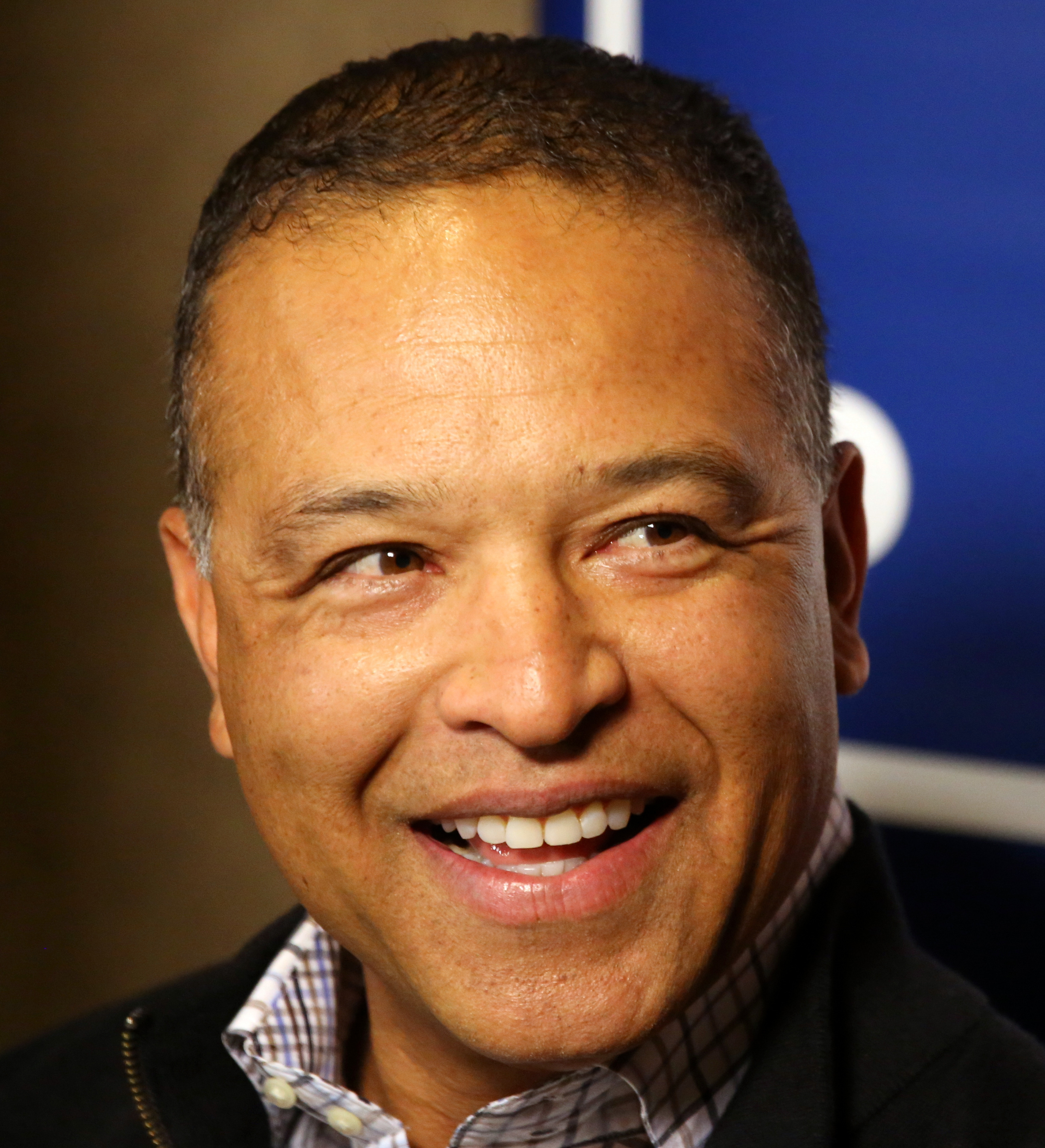
Rays manager Kevin Cash (top) and Dodgers manager Dave Roberts

After COVID-19 outbreaks among several teams resulted in the postponement of about 40 regular season games, MLB and the MLBPA agreed to hold the division series, league championships, and World Series in protective "bubble" environments at neutral sites to limit the chances of experiencing another outbreak. MLB chose Globe Life Field in Arlington, Texas, as the site of the 2020 World Series. The Texas Rangers, who play their home games at Globe Life Field, failed to qualify for the postseason. It was the first time since the 1944 World Series (played between the St. Louis Cardinals and St. Louis Browns, who shared Sportsman's Park as their home field) that the entire series was held at one ballpark.

While fans were not permitted to attend MLB games during the 2020 season, Commissioner Rob Manfred expressed his hope that fans would be able to attend the World Series in a limited capacity. On September 30, MLB announced that fans would be able to attend the NLCS and World Series at 25% capacity, allowing a maximum of 11,500 people to attend each game at Globe Life Field. Both teams stayed at the Four Seasons Resort and Club Dallas at Las Colinas as the designated bubble hotel.

=== Tampa Bay Rays ===
The Tampa Bay Rays of the American League made their second appearance in the World Series in franchise history and first since 2008. They finished the shortened regular season with a 40–20 (.667) record, the best in the American League. They then swept the Toronto Blue Jays in two games in the Wild Card Series, defeated the New York Yankees in five games in the Division Series, and defeated the Houston Astros in seven games after leading 3–0 in the American League Championship Series (ALCS). Randy Arozarena hit seven home runs in 14 postseason games prior to the World Series, becoming the first rookie position player to win the ALCS Most Valuable Player Award. After his performance in the World Series, Arozarena would break records in home runs, hits, and total bases in a single postseason.

=== Los Angeles Dodgers ===
The Los Angeles Dodgers of the National League made their 21st appearance in the World Series, passing the Giants for most all-time in the National League, and third in four years, having lost in 2017 and 2018. Prior to the 2020 season, the Dodgers traded outfielder Alex Verdugo and minor leaguers Connor Wong and Jeter Downs to the Boston Red Sox in exchange for outfielder Mookie Betts, starting pitcher David Price and cash considerations. The Dodgers finished the shortened regular season with a 43–17 (.717) record, the best in all of MLB. Betts finished the 2020 60 game regular-season hitting .292/.366/.562 with 47 runs (fourth in the NL), 16 home runs (third), 39 RBIs, a .928 OPS, and 10 stolen bases.

The Dodgers swept both the Milwaukee Brewers in the Wild Card Series and the San Diego Padres in the Division Series, before defeating the Atlanta Braves in seven games in the National League Championship Series (NLCS) after trailing 3–1 in that series. In the NLCS, Betts made three straight series saving defensive gems in elimination games for the Dodgers, as they were the fourteenth team in MLB history to come back from a 3–1 postseason series deficit.

=== Series notes ===
This was the fourth time in the Wild Card era where both teams with the best record in each league faced each other in the World Series. This had previously occurred in 1995, 1999, and 2013.

This was the first World Series to feature two cities that held either the NBA or NHL title in the same year, as the Los Angeles Lakers won the 2020 NBA Finals on October 11, and the Tampa Bay Lightning won the 2020 Stanley Cup Final on September 28. With the Tampa Bay Buccaneers eventually winning Super Bowl LV in 2021, Tampa Bay's NHL, MLB, and NFL teams all made the championship rounds within a six-month span.

This was the first World Series since 1993 to have all games played on artificial turf.

==== Connections between the two teams ====
Andrew Friedman, the Dodgers President of Baseball Operations, was the Rays' general manager from 2004 to 2014. Under Friedman's tenure as general manager the Rays saw their first run of success as a franchise, which was highlighted by a World Series appearance in 2008 and five 90-win seasons from 2008 to 2013. The 2020 Rays had only five players who were originally acquired by Friedman: Kevin Kiermaier (drafted in 2010) Blake Snell (drafted in 2011), José Alvarado (signed as an International amateur in 2012), Diego Castillo (signed as an International amateur in 2014), and Willy Adames (traded for in 2014). Only Alvarado was not on Tampa's World Series roster. Current Rays GM Erik Neander also received his start in baseball under Friedman in 2007 as an intern. Other connections between the two teams included Brandon Gomes, the current Dodgers Vice President & Assistant General Manager, who was a Rays middle relief pitcher from 2011 to 2015, and Joel Peralta, the current Dodgers Special Assistant of Baseball Operations, who was a popular Rays reliever from 2011 to 2014. Dodgers relievers Adam Kolarek was also a member of the Rays from 2017 to 2019, while Dylan Floro briefly pitched for Tampa Bay in 2016.

== Summary ==
Los Angeles won the series, 4–2.

Game	Date	Score	Location	Time	Attendance
1	October 20	Tampa Bay Rays – 3, Los Angeles Dodgers – 8	Globe Life Field	3:24	11,388
2	October 21	Tampa Bay Rays – 6, Los Angeles Dodgers – 4	Globe Life Field	3:40	11,472
3	October 23	Los Angeles Dodgers – 6, Tampa Bay Rays – 2	Globe Life Field	3:14	11,447
4	October 24	Los Angeles Dodgers – 7, Tampa Bay Rays – 8	Globe Life Field	4:10	11,441
5	October 25	Los Angeles Dodgers – 4, Tampa Bay Rays – 2	Globe Life Field	3:30	11,437
6	October 27	Tampa Bay Rays – 1, Los Angeles Dodgers – 3	Globe Life Field	3:28	11,437

== Matchups ==
=== Game 1 ===
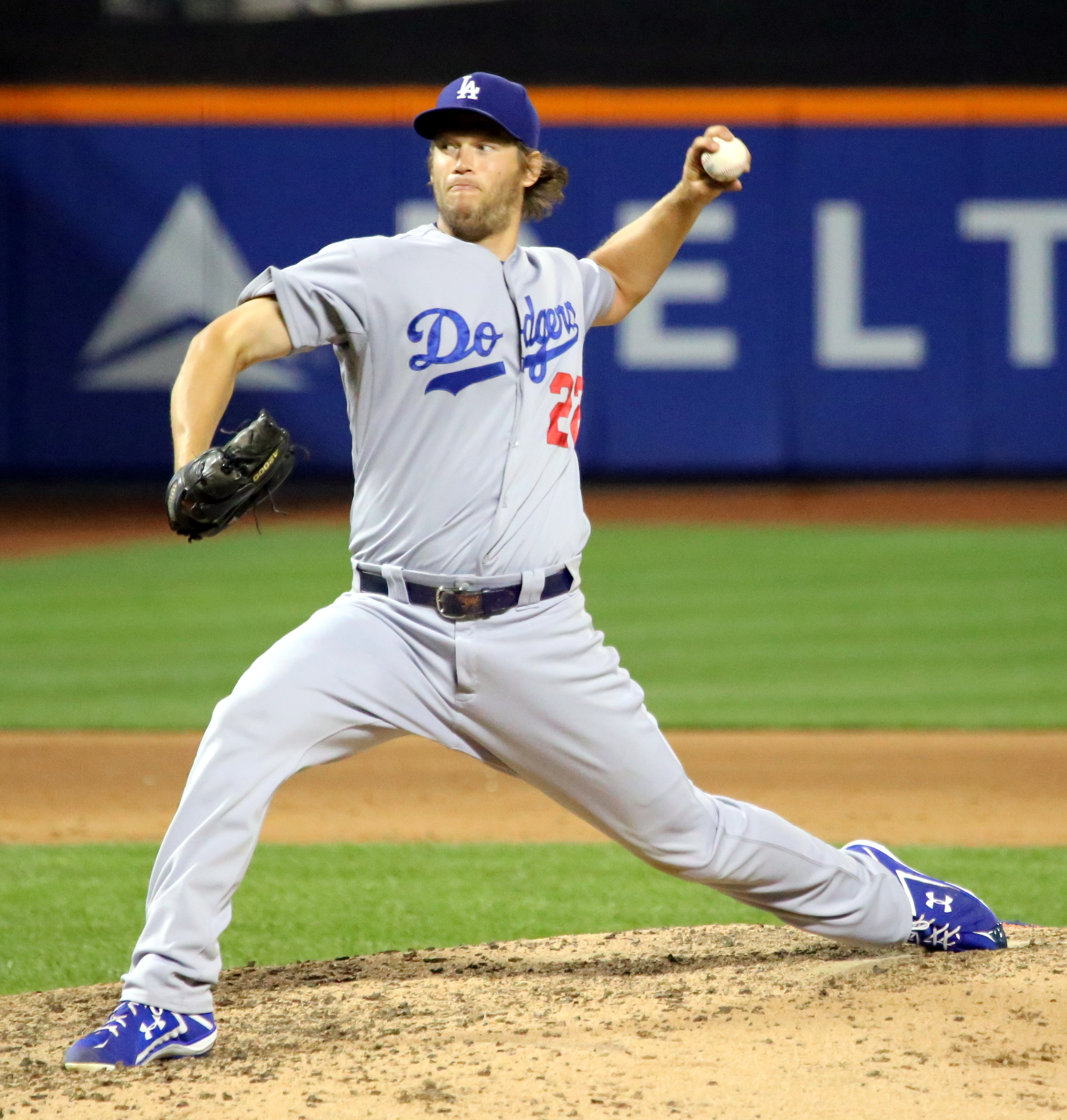
Game 1 winning pitcher Clayton Kershaw

October 20, 2020 7:11 pm (CDT) at Globe Life Field in Arlington, Texas, 82 °F (28 °C), partly cloudy
Team	1	2	3	4	5	6	7	8	9	R	H	E
Tampa Bay	0	0	0	0	1	0	2	0	0	3	6	0
Los Angeles	0	0	0	2	4	2	0	0	X	8	10	0
WP: Clayton Kershaw (1–0) LP: Tyler Glasnow (0–1); Home runs: TB: Kevin Kiermaier (1); LAD: Cody Bellinger (1), Mookie Betts (1); Attendance: 11,388; Boxscore

For the pregame ceremony, Pentatonix performed the national anthem and four first responders threw out ceremonial first pitches.

Cody Bellinger hit a two-run home run off Tyler Glasnow in the fourth inning for the first runs of the series. Kevin Kiermaier reduced the Tampa Bay deficit to one run with a solo home run in the fifth inning. The Dodgers scored four runs in the fifth inning on a run batted in (RBI) fielder's choice by Max Muncy, followed by RBI singles by Will Smith, Chris Taylor, and Kiké Hernández. Glasnow finished with six runs allowed (all earned) in 4 1/3 innings on three hits and six walks, with eight strikeouts. Betts homered off Josh Fleming in the sixth inning. Muncy then doubled home Justin Turner for another run. Clayton Kershaw, who grew up just a few miles from Globe Life Field, came out of the game after the sixth inning, having only allowed two hits (one of them the solo homer) and one walk while striking out eight. The Rays scored two runs in the seventh inning, when Mike Brosseau and Kiermaier singled in runs off reliever Victor González. The Dodgers held on to win 8–3.

The Dodgers tied several postseason records in Game 1. Kershaw's 11th postseason start tied Greg Maddux for second-most in MLB history, and he recorded his 200th postseason strikeout in the fifth inning, surpassing John Smoltz for second-most all time. The Dodgers as a team tied the New York Giants (1912) for most stolen bases in a single World Series inning, with three.

=== Game 2 ===
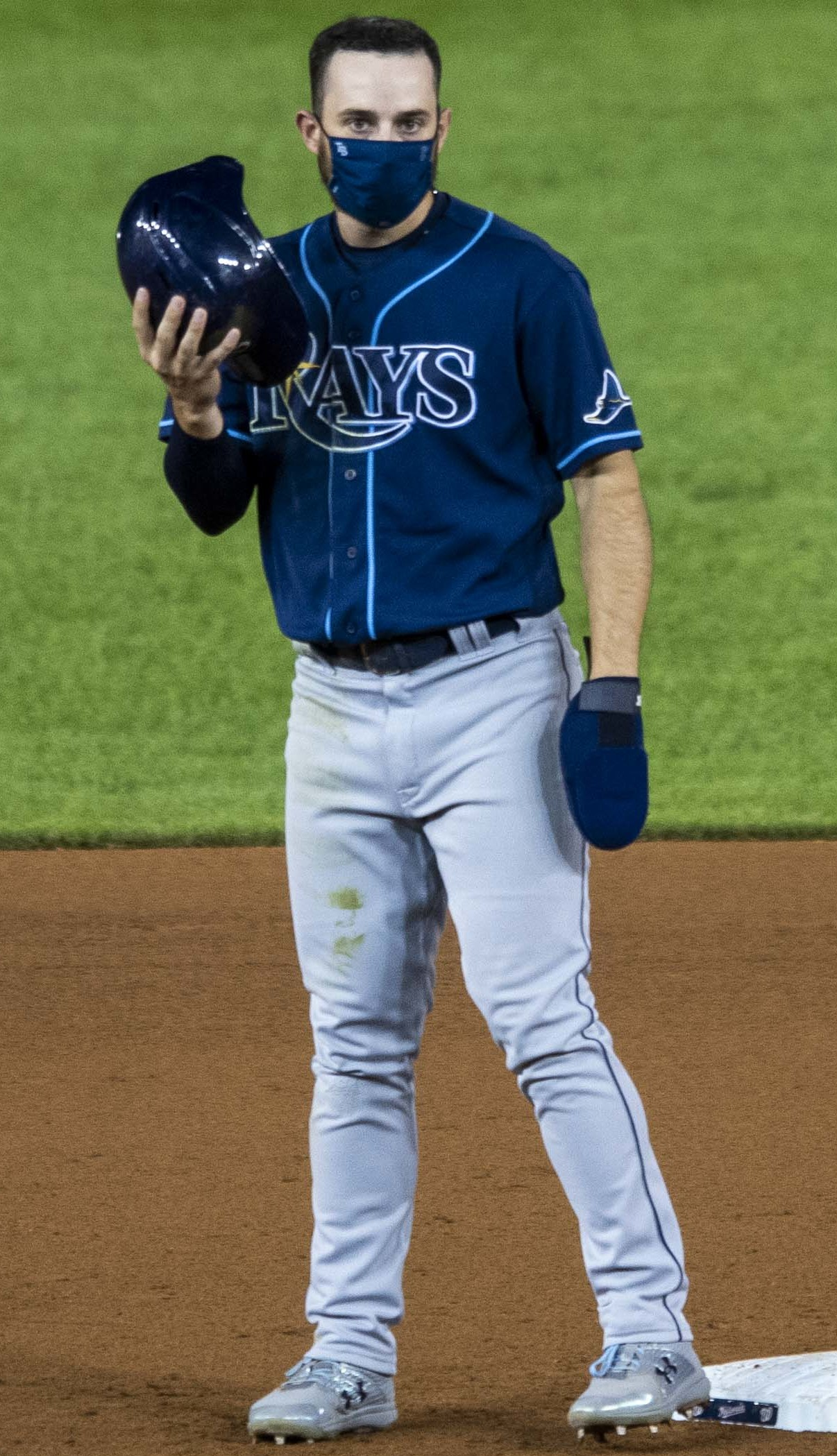
Brandon Lowe had two home runs and three RBIs in Game 2.

October 21, 2020 7:08 pm (CDT) at Globe Life Field in Arlington, Texas, 81 °F (27 °C), partly cloudy
Team	1	2	3	4	5	6	7	8	9	R	H	E
Tampa Bay	1	0	0	2	2	1	0	0	0	6	10	0
Los Angeles	0	0	0	0	2	1	0	1	0	4	5	1
WP: Nick Anderson (1–0) LP: Tony Gonsolin (0–1) Sv: Diego Castillo (1); Home runs: TB: Brandon Lowe 2 (2); LAD: Chris Taylor (1), Will Smith (1), Corey Seager (1); Attendance: 11,472; Boxscore

Following Game 1, Dodgers manager Dave Roberts announced that Tony Gonsolin would start Game 2. Blake Snell started for the Rays. Brandon Lowe hit a solo homer off Gonsolin in the first inning to give the Rays their first lead of the series. Gonsolin allowed no other hits or runs and left after 1 1/3 innings, the shortest start in the World Series since Jake Peavy in 2014. Joey Wendle doubled in two runs off Dustin May in the fourth inning to extend the Rays' lead to three. The teams traded two-run homers in the fifth inning, with Lowe hitting his second of the night, this time off May, and Chris Taylor, whose home run off Snell was the Dodgers' first hit of the game. Snell pitched 4 2/3 innings and allowed two hits and four walks while striking out nine. A sacrifice fly by Wendle off Joe Kelly in the sixth added another run for the Rays and Will Smith homered off Nick Anderson in the bottom of the inning for the Dodgers. Corey Seager hit a home run in the eighth inning off Pete Fairbanks to close the gap to two, and set a new postseason record for most home runs by a shortstop (seven). The Rays held on to even the series with a 6–4 win. The Dodgers struck out 15 times in the game, tying the World Series franchise record set in the 18-inning third game of the 2018 World Series. Ji-man Choi became the first Korean-born player to record a hit in the World Series.

=== Game 3 ===
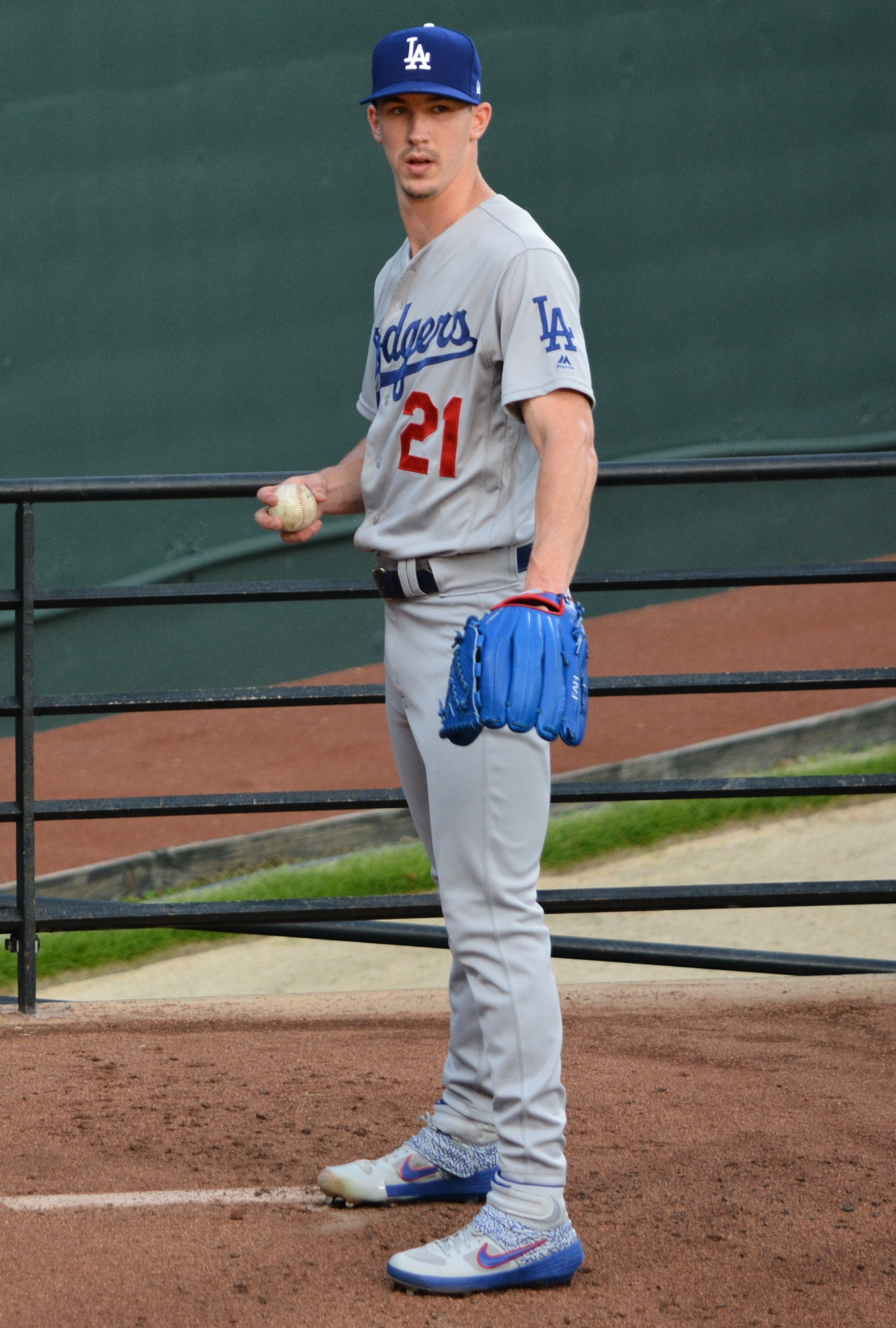
Game 3 winning pitcher Walker Buehler

October 23, 2020 7:08 pm (CDT) at Globe Life Field in Arlington, Texas, 74 °F (23 °C), roof closed
Team	1	2	3	4	5	6	7	8	9	R	H	E
Los Angeles	1	0	2	2	0	1	0	0	0	6	10	0
Tampa Bay	0	0	0	0	1	0	0	0	1	2	4	0
WP: Walker Buehler (1–0) LP: Charlie Morton (0–1); Home runs: LAD: Justin Turner (1), Austin Barnes (1); TB: Randy Arozarena (1); Attendance: 11,447; Boxscore

Walker Buehler started Game 3 for the Dodgers, and the Rays countered with Charlie Morton. Justin Turner hit a solo home run off Morton in the first inning for the first run of the game. In doing so, he tied Duke Snider for the most postseason home runs in Dodgers franchise history with 11. Max Muncy drove in two runs with a single in the third inning and the Dodgers set a new record for the most runs scored with two outs in a single postseason with 48. The Dodgers scored two more runs in the fourth inning on a safety squeeze by Austin Barnes and an RBI single by Mookie Betts. Morton was removed from the game after 4 1/3 innings; he allowed five runs on seven hits and one walk while striking out six.

A double by Willy Adames in the fifth inning gave the Rays their first run. Barnes hit a solo home run off John Curtiss in the sixth inning for the Dodgers, becoming the first player since Héctor López in 1961 to have both a squeeze bunt and a homer in the same World Series game. Buehler pitched six innings and allowed one run on three hits and one walk with 10 strikeouts, becoming the third-youngest pitcher with 10 or more strikeouts and three or fewer hits in a World Series game, behind only Ed Walsh in 1906 and Josh Beckett in 2003. Randy Arozarena hit a solo home run for Tampa Bay in the bottom of the ninth inning off Kenley Jansen, to give him a record-tying eight home runs and a record setting 23 hits in the postseason, but the Dodgers held on to win 6–2 to take a 2–1 lead in the series.

=== Game 4 ===
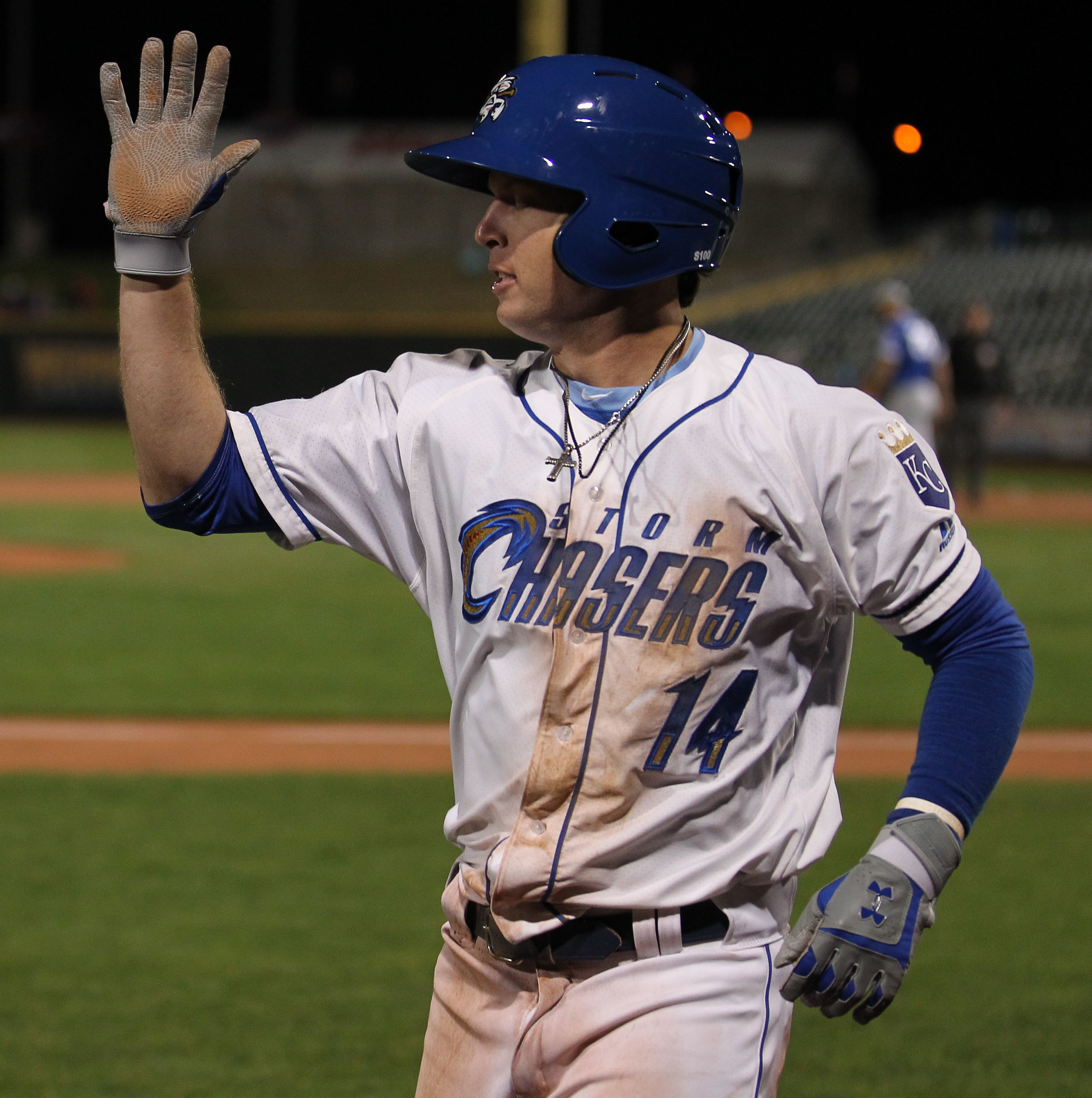
Brett Phillips (pictured with the Omaha Storm Chasers) recorded the game-winning single for the Rays in Game 4.

October 24, 2020 7:09 pm (CDT) at Globe Life Field in Arlington, Texas, 57 °F (14 °C), cloudy
Team	1	2	3	4	5	6	7	8	9	R	H	E
Los Angeles	1	0	1	0	1	1	2	1	0	7	15	2
Tampa Bay	0	0	0	1	1	3	1	0	2	8	10	0
WP: John Curtiss (1–0) LP: Kenley Jansen (0–1); Home runs: LAD: Justin Turner (2), Corey Seager (2); TB: Randy Arozarena (2), Hunter Renfroe (1), Brandon Lowe (3), Kevin Kiermaier (2); Attendance: 11,441; Boxscore

External videos
- Game 4 full replay on the MLB's official YouTube channel

In Game 4, Julio Urías started for Los Angeles and Ryan Yarbrough for Tampa Bay. For the second game in a row, Justin Turner hit a solo home run in the first inning. With that, he passed Duke Snider for most postseason home runs in franchise history and became the first player in MLB history to homer in the first inning of back-to-back World Series games. Corey Seager hit a solo home run in the third, for his eighth of the postseason, tying for the most all-time in a single postseason with Randy Arozarena, Barry Bonds, Carlos Beltrán, and Nelson Cruz. Yarbrough pitched 3 1/3 innings with two runs allowed on five hits and one walk. Arozarena hit another home run leading off the bottom of the fourth inning, for his ninth of the postseason and sole possession of the record. Muncy hit an RBI single off Fairbanks to score Seager in the fifth inning. Hunter Renfroe hit a solo homer in the bottom of the inning to return the lead to one run. Urías pitched 4 2/3 innings, allowing two runs on four hits and one walk with eight strikeouts. The Dodgers scored again in the sixth inning on an RBI single by Kiké Hernández against Diego Castillo. A three-run home run by Lowe, his third of the series, off Pedro Báez in the bottom of the inning gave the Rays their first lead of the game. Joc Pederson drove in two runs with a pinch hit single in the seventh inning off Nick Anderson to put the Dodgers back ahead. Kevin Kiermaier hit a solo homer in the bottom of the inning off Báez to tie the game. Seager, with his fourth hit of the game, drove in Chris Taylor on a single in the eighth against Anderson to put the Dodgers back up again.

With two outs in the bottom of the ninth and down in the count 1–2, Brett Phillips singled off Kenley Jansen for his first career postseason hit. As Kiermaier scored to tie the game, Taylor misfielded the ball in center field. As Arozarena rounded third base, he fell and began to head back to third base after getting back on his feet. With Muncy cutting off the throw from the outfield, his relay throw to Will Smith went off Smith's mitt, allowing Arozarena to dive in safely at home to give the Rays an 8–7 win and tie the series at two. It was the first World Series game to end on an error since Game 6 of the 1986 World Series and Jansen was credited with his record fourth blown save in World Series appearances. Phillips also became the first player since Kirk Gibson in the 1988 World Series to get a game-winning hit with two out in the bottom of the ninth inning.

=== Game 5 ===
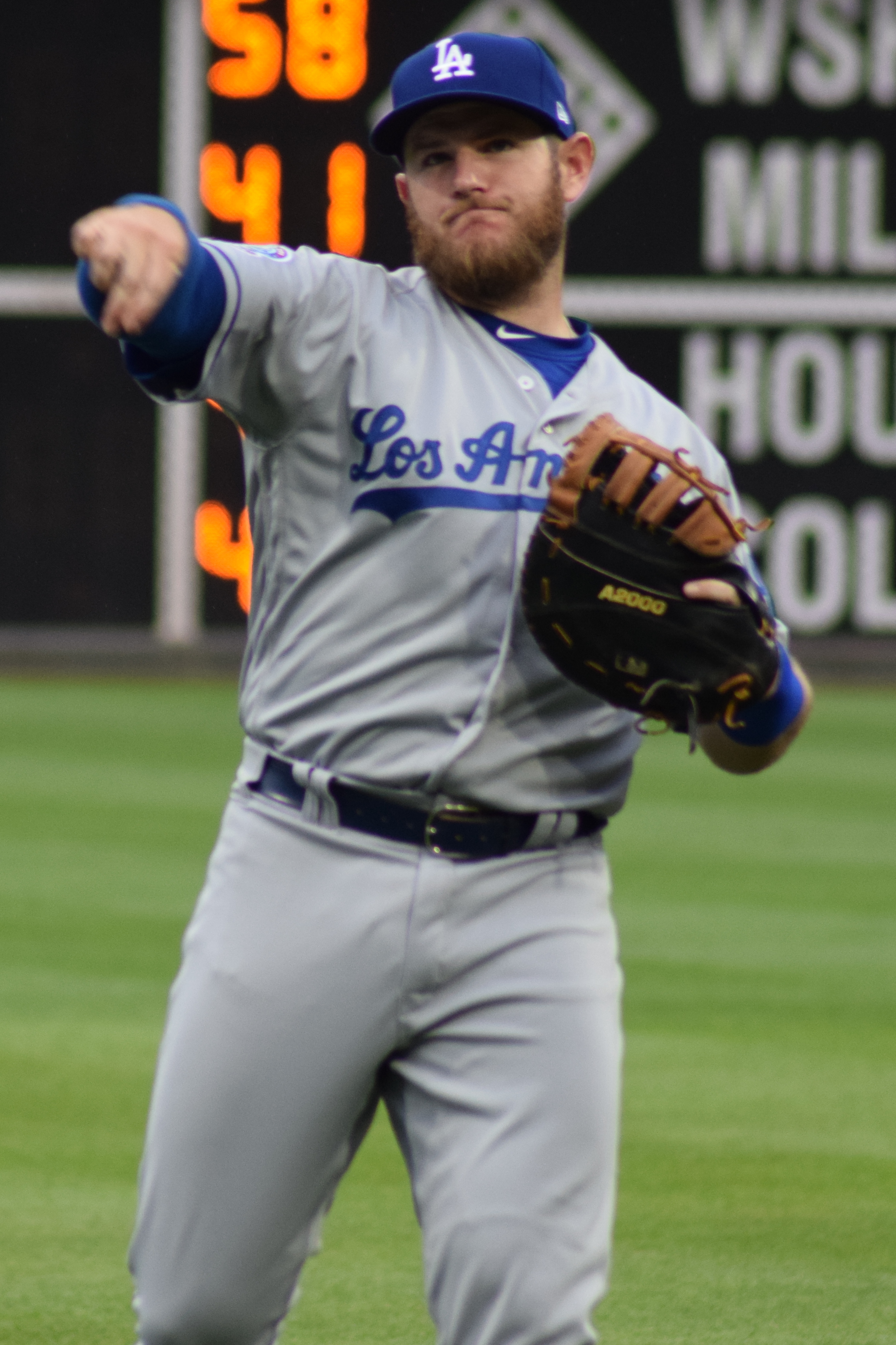
Max Muncy was 2-for-3 including a home run in Game 5.

October 25, 2020 7:08 pm (CDT) at Globe Life Field in Arlington, Texas, 74 °F (23 °C), roof closed
Team	1	2	3	4	5	6	7	8	9	R	H	E
Los Angeles	2	1	0	0	1	0	0	0	0	4	6	1
Tampa Bay	0	0	2	0	0	0	0	0	0	2	7	0
WP: Clayton Kershaw (2–0) LP: Tyler Glasnow (0–2) Sv: Blake Treinen (1); Home runs: LAD: Joc Pederson (1), Max Muncy (1); TB: None; Attendance: 11,437; Boxscore

Game 5 featured a rematch of Game 1 starting pitchers; Clayton Kershaw for the Dodgers and Tyler Glasnow for the Rays. This was Kershaw's sixth World Series start, tying him for third in Dodgers history behind Sandy Koufax and Carl Erskine. The Dodgers got the early lead again in this game, with Betts doubling to start the game and being driven in by a single by Seager, who advanced to second and third on wild pitches, and then scored on an infield hit by Cody Bellinger. Pederson hit a solo home run in the second to extend the Dodgers' lead to three. An RBI triple by Yandy Díaz drove in the Rays' first run in the third inning. Díaz then scored on a single by Arozarena, who collected his 27th hit, the most in a single postseason. In the bottom of the fourth inning, Manuel Margot walked, stole second, and advanced to third on an error; he attempted to steal home with two outs, but was tagged out at the plate on a throw from Kershaw to catcher Austin Barnes. Charley Steiner, long-time Dodgers' radio announcer, pointed out that with the stands near the field mostly empty, Kershaw could hear his teammates in the dugout with the early warning.

Muncy hit a solo homer in the fifth inning as the Dodgers set a new major league record for different players on the same team hitting a home run in a postseason series, with nine. Glasnow pitched five innings (the first Rays starter to do so in the series), allowing four runs on six hits and three walks with seven strikeouts. Kershaw's strikeout of Kiermaier in the bottom of the fifth inning moved him past Justin Verlander for the record of most career postseason strikeouts. He finished with 5 2/3 innings pitched, two runs allowed on five hits, and two walks with six strikeouts. The bullpens held the game scoreless the rest of the way, and the Dodgers won 4–2 to regain the series lead.

=== Game 6 ===
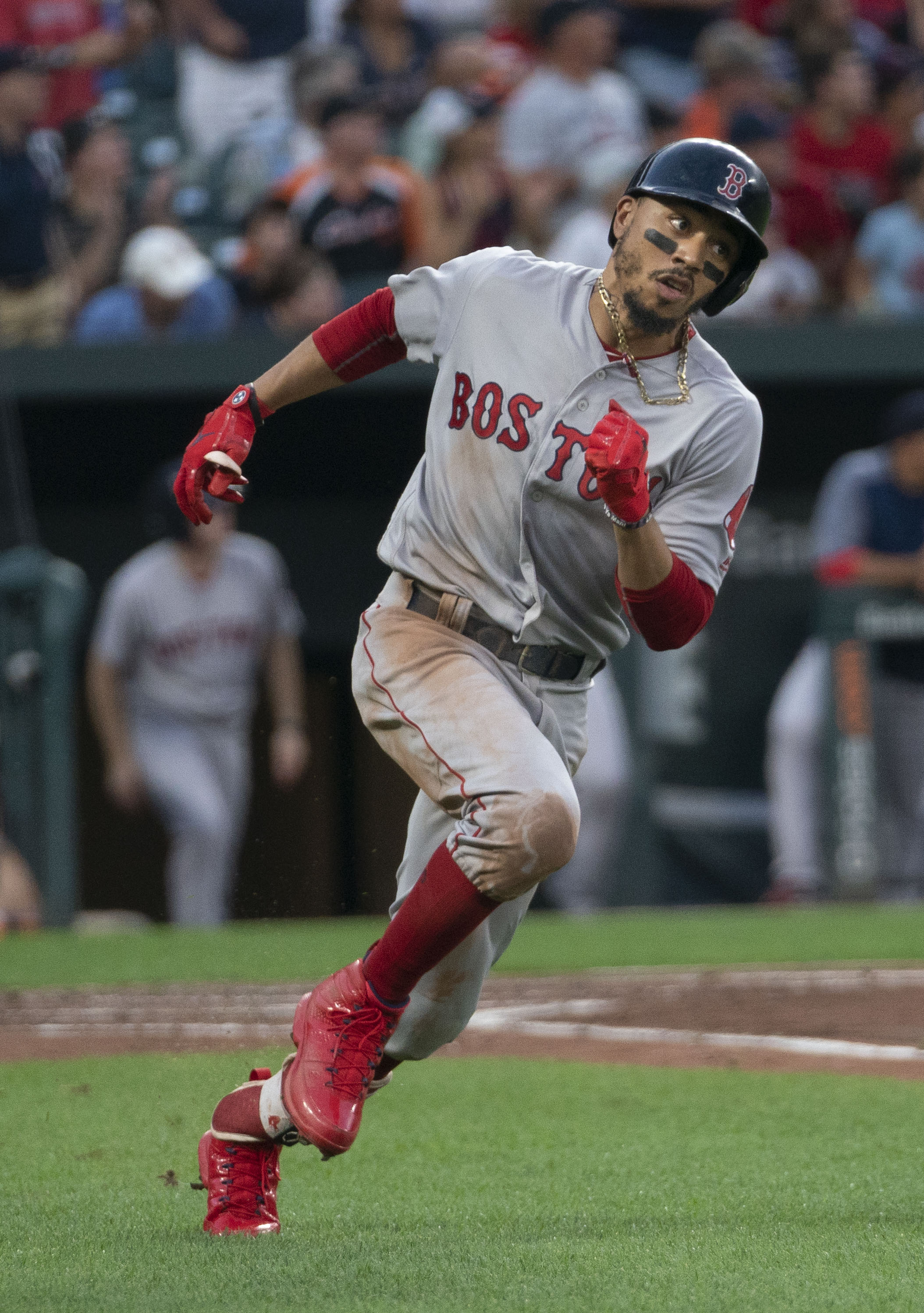
Mookie Betts (pictured with the Red Sox) ran in the go-ahead score and had a home run to clinch the World Series for the Dodgers.

October 27, 2020 7:09 pm (CDT) at Globe Life Field in Arlington, Texas, 74 °F (23 °C), roof closed
Team	1	2	3	4	5	6	7	8	9	R	H	E
Tampa Bay	1	0	0	0	0	0	0	0	0	1	5	0
Los Angeles	0	0	0	0	0	2	0	1	X	3	5	0
WP: Victor Gonzalez (1–0) LP: Nick Anderson (1–1) Sv: Julio Urías (1); Home runs: TB: Randy Arozarena (3); LAD: Mookie Betts (2); Attendance: 11,437; Boxscore

Facing elimination, the Rays started Blake Snell, who had a no decision in Game 2. The Dodgers countered with Tony Gonsolin, who allowed one run as an opener in Game 2 and took the loss. The Rays scored first with a solo home run by Randy Arozarena, his tenth during the postseason and third of the World Series, extending the record he broke back in Game 4. No other player had hit more than eight homers in a single postseason, and Arozarena was also the Rays' career postseason home run leader after just his first year with the team. Gonsolin faced 10 batters in his second start, lasting 1 2/3 innings while allowing Arozarena's home run plus two hits and two walks. After Snell allowed a hit to Austin Barnes with one out in the bottom of the sixth inning, Rays manager Kevin Cash controversially decided to remove Snell from the game, who allowed only two hits throwing 73 pitches while striking out nine and walking none in 5 1/3 innings. Cash brought in reliever Nick Anderson, who gave up a double to Mookie Betts before throwing a wild pitch with Corey Seager at bat that allowed Barnes to score the tying run. The Dodgers then took the lead on a fielder's choice grounder by Seager that scored Betts. The Dodgers added another run in the eighth inning when Betts hit a home run off Pete Fairbanks. Julio Urías pitched the last 2 1/3 innings for the save, closing out the series by striking out Willy Adames looking, as the Dodgers won their seventh World Series championship and first since 1988. This was the first World Series since 2013 in which what was considered the "home team" won in what was considered "home field."

Postgame, Seager was presented with the World Series Most Valuable Player Award. He was the eighth player—and first since Madison Bumgarner in 2014—to be named MVP of both the World Series and League Championship Series in the same season. He batted .328 in the Dodgers' 18 postseason games.

The Dodgers were the first team since the 2010 San Francisco Giants to win the World Series with a fully homegrown rotation starting every postseason game.

With the World Series win, the only team to beat the Dodgers in a series in 2020 was the Colorado Rockies, who had won two out of three at Dodger Stadium in early September. Because of an expanded 16-team postseason field, the Dodgers' 13 postseason wins were the most in MLB history. Over the next six seasons, this would be matched by the Texas Rangers in 2023, and Dodgers themselves in 2025.

==== Justin Turner COVID-19 incident ====
During the postgame celebrations, it was announced that Justin Turner was removed in the eighth inning due to a positive COVID-19 test result. Despite tweeting that he was asymptomatic, Turner nevertheless took part in the championship celebration after the Dodgers had won the game, violating MLB protocols. He was the only player to test positive for the virus during the entire postseason bubble. The next day, Major League Baseball announced that Turner would be under investigation. On November 6, Turner apologized for the incident, and received no punishment from commissioner Rob Manfred, who admitted that MLB could have handled the situation better.

=== Series statistics ===
Team	1	2	3	4	5	6	7	8	9	R	H	E
Tampa Bay Rays	2	0	2	3	5	4	3	0	3	22	42	0
Los Angeles Dodgers	4	1	3	4	8	7	2	3	0	32	51	4
Home runs: TB: Randy Arozarena (3), Brandon Lowe (3), Kevin Kiermaier (2), Hunter Renfroe (1); LAD: Mookie Betts (2), Corey Seager (2), Justin Turner (2), Austin Barnes (1), Cody Bellinger (1), Max Muncy (1), Joc Pederson (1), Will Smith (1), Chris Taylor (1); Total attendance: 68,622 Average attendance: 11,437; Winning player's share: $440,910 Losing player's share: $259,722

== Broadcasting ==
=== Television ===
For the 21st straight year, the World Series was televised in the United States by Fox (including the local stations WTVT in Tampa and KTTV in Los Angeles). Joe Buck called the games as play-by-play announcer, along with John Smoltz as color analyst and Ken Rosenthal and Tom Verducci as field reporters. Kevin Burkhardt hosted the network's pregame and postgame shows, joined by analysts Frank Thomas, Alex Rodriguez, David Ortiz, and Dontrelle Willis. Due to the pandemic, Fox's pregame and postgame shows all took place in their Los Angeles studios, as opposed to traveling on the road. Fox Deportes aired the series in Spanish, with Rolando Nichols, Edgar Gonzalez, Adrian Garcia Marquez, Carlos Alvarez, and Jaime Motta.

MLB International fed the series to broadcasters outside the United States, with Matt Vasgersian providing play-by-play and Buck Martinez as color commentator.

==== Ratings ====
Viewership numbers don't include Fox Deportes.

Game	Ratings (households)	Share (households)	U.S. audience (in millions)	Ref
1	5.1	11	9.353	
2	5.0	11	9.184	
3	4.3	10	8.339	
4	4.8	12	9.563	
5	5.3	11	10.288	
6	6.8	15	12.819	

Game 1 was the least-watched World Series game ever, in terms of number of viewers, per Nielsen Media Research records dating back to 1968; it was also the first World Series game to draw less than 10 million viewers since Game 3 in 2008, which underwent a 90-minute rain delay. Games 2 and 3 subsequently established new lows. and the average of 9.785 million viewers per game set a new World Series low.

=== Radio ===
ESPN Radio broadcast the series in the United States, with Dan Shulman on play-by-play, Chris Singleton and Jessica Mendoza as color analysts, Buster Olney as reporter, and Marc Kestecher hosting the pregame shows. Mendoza became the first woman to serve as a game analyst on a national World Series broadcast. Shulman, Singleton, and Mendoza called the games from ESPN's studios in Bristol, Connecticut due to the COVID-19 pandemic. The flagship radio stations for each team broadcast the games locally with their own announcers: WDAE (in English) and WGES (in Spanish) for Tampa Bay, and KLAC (in English), KTNQ (in Spanish), and KMPC (in Korean) for Los Angeles.

== Aftermath ==
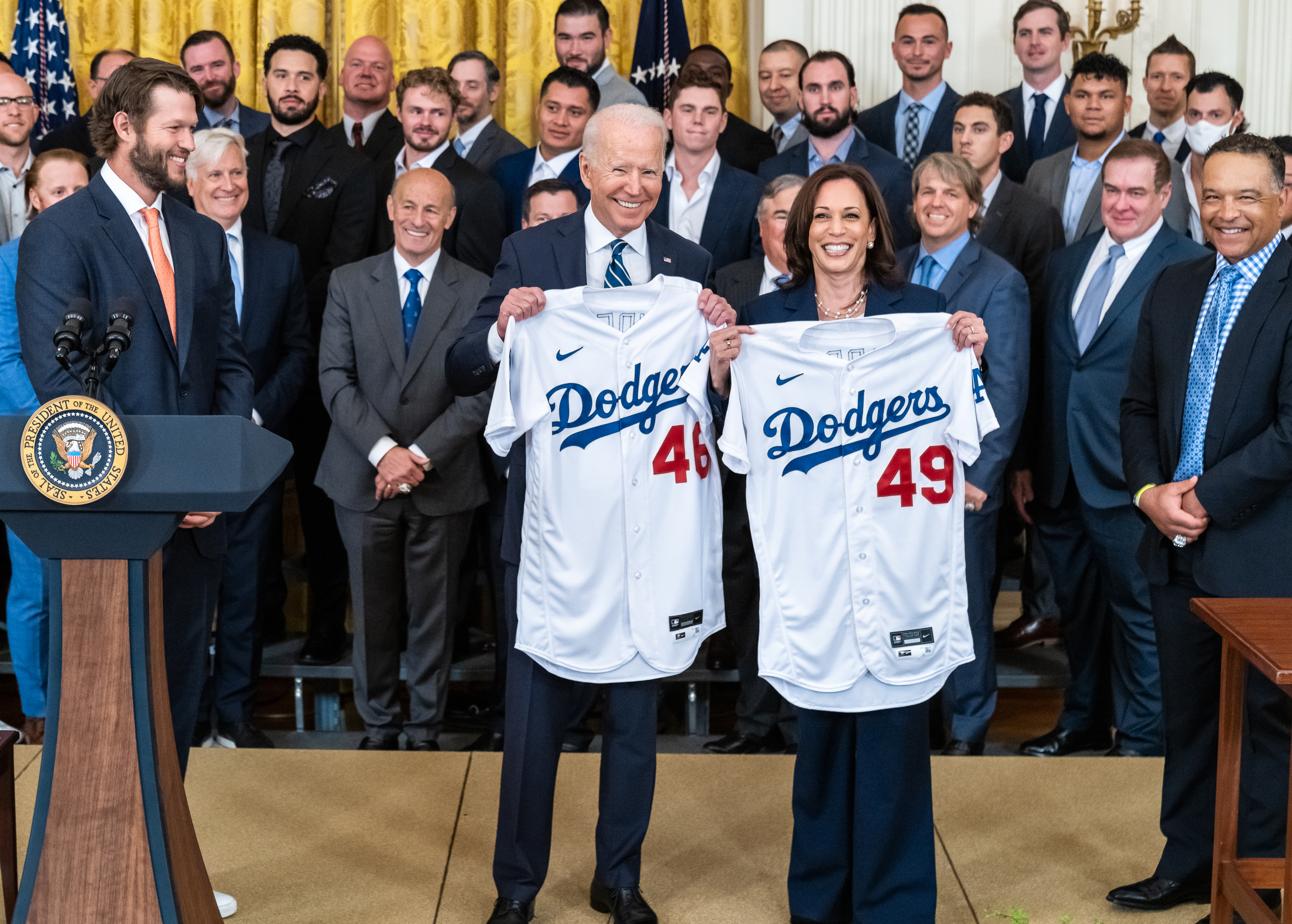
President Joe Biden and Vice President Kamala Harris with the Los Angeles Dodgers

=== Dodgers ===
Minutes after the final out, Los Angeles International Airport, Los Angeles City Hall, L.A. Live, the Santa Monica Pier and many other Los Angeles landmarks lit up blue to celebrate the Dodgers' World Series championship. Retired Hall of Fame broadcaster Vin Scully, the voice of the Dodgers from 1950 to 2016, congratulated his former team on Twitter and it was announced a few days later that Scully would narrate the team's year-end championship documentary. The 2020 championship was the final Dodgers' title Scully was able to witness before his death in August 2022.

With the Lakers having won the NBA Finals, Los Angeles repeated its achievement of having NBA and World Series champions in the same year, as both the Lakers and Dodgers had won in 1988. 16 months later, the Los Angeles Rams would win Super Bowl LVI over the Cincinnati Bengals, and to follow it up 8 months later, LAFC went on to win the 2022 MLS Cup in a penalty shootout by defeating the Philadelphia Union, meaning Los Angeles would be the first city to celebrate NBA, MLB, NFL, and MLS championships within a two-year span.

Due to the COVID-19 pandemic, Los Angeles mayor Eric Garcetti advised fans not to gather for large celebrations. Nevertheless, many fans took to the streets of Los Angeles, lighting off fireworks and taking over street intersections in areas such as Pico Boulevard, Broadway and Figueroa Street, before being dispersed by police. The day after the World Series, the Dodgers released a statement regarding a public victory parade, stating any celebration would be postponed. The parade never would happen as Los Angeles did not lessen its COVID-19 restrictions until well into the 2021 season. When the Dodgers went to go face the Washington Nationals in July 2021, the team visited the White House and President Joe Biden to honor and celebrate its World Series victory.

In 2023, Corey Seager, by that time, a Texas Ranger, would become the first player in MLB history to win World Series MVP for two teams in different leagues, as his Rangers defeated the Diamondbacks in five games.

The Dodgers would win the World Series four years later in 2024. That year, the team and its fans were able to celebrate with a parade. Despite the World Series victories being four years apart, there were many 2020 Dodgers still on the team, including Walker Buehler, Brusdar Graterol, Blake Treinen, Austin Barnes, Will Smith, Chris Taylor, Enrique Hernández (who left the team as a free agent after the 2020 season, but came back in 2023), Gavin Lux, Max Muncy, and Mookie Betts, with manager Dave Roberts and most of the coaching staff still intact. Clayton Kershaw and Joe Kelly were still on the team, but did not appear in any postseason games due to injuries. A year later, they repeated as champions.

This World Series was the start of the 'Will Smith' World Series victory streak. From 2020 to 2025, either catcher Will Smith or relief pitcher Will Smith won the World Series. Pitcher Will Smith won in 2021, 2022, 2023 (all with three separate teams), while catcher Will Smith would win in 2020, 2024, and 2025.

=== Rays ===
Kevin Cash would receive tremendous backlash for his decision to remove Blake Snell after just 73 pitches in the sixth inning of Game 6. Cash defended his decision, stating he did not want Snell going through the Dodgers order a third time, despite his dominance for 5 1/3 innings. Yahoo Sports immediately named it one of the worst decisions in World Series history, while MLB.com called it the third worst in World Series history. FOX Sports post-game analyst and former big leaguer Alex Rodriguez said it was the worst decision he had ever seen in baseball. Upon his removal, opposing manager Dave Roberts said during postgame, "Mookie looked at me with a little smile. We were all just excited that Snell was out of the game." Cash's decision sparked a discussion in whether modern managers were using too much sabermetrics and statistical analysis when making decisions rather than going with their instincts. Some noted that while the decision was controversial, the Rays offense had only scored one run, and the Dodgers, who hit starters remarkably better the third time through the order, had not been shut out all season. Cash had also managed his starters with a short leash the whole season. In a similar move, Cash pulled Charlie Morton from Game 7 of the ALCS at 66 pitches, even though Morton only allowed 2 hits and no runs through for 5 2/3. A month later, Cash would be voted as the Manager of the Year in 2020 for his work in the regular season.

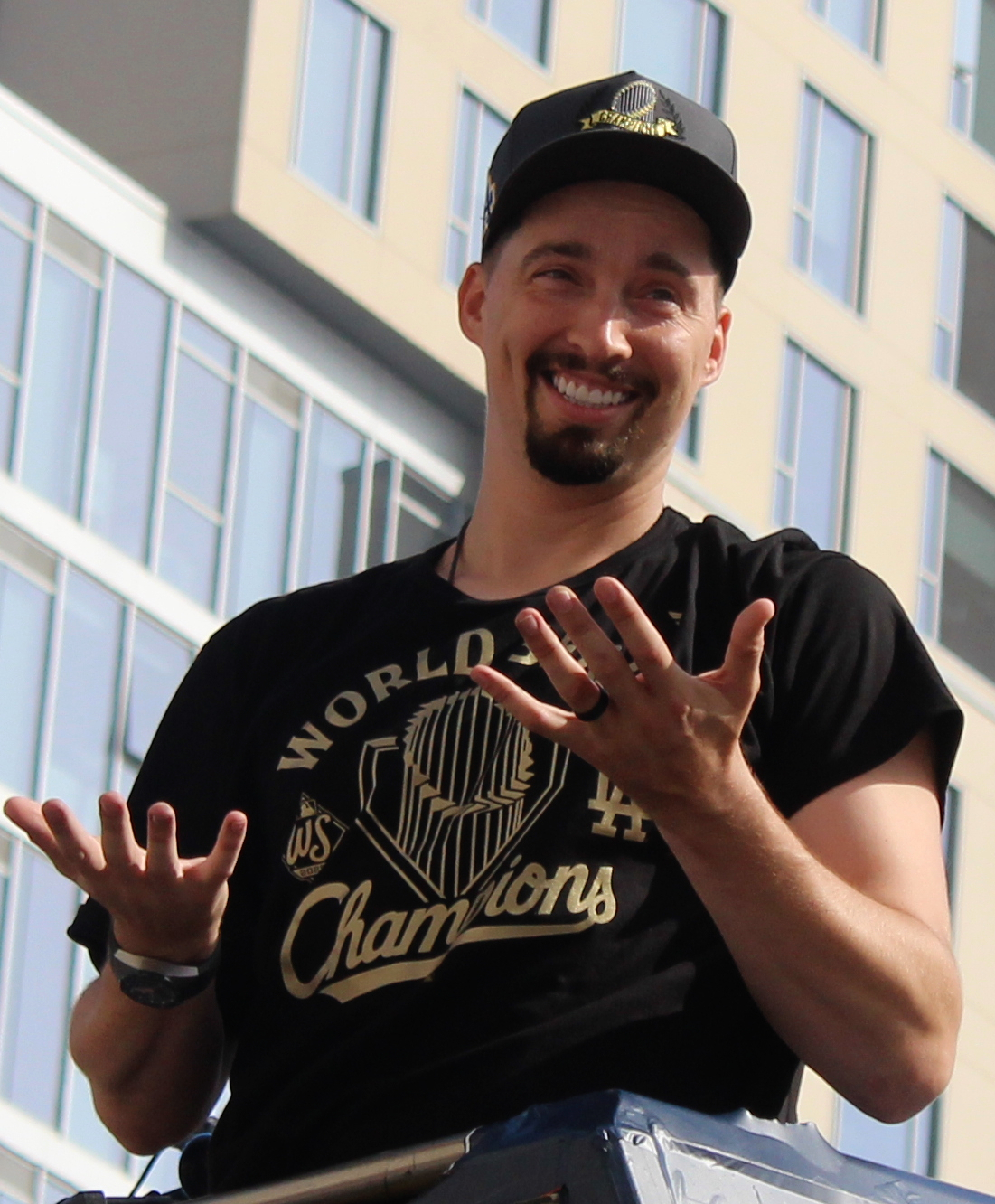
Blake Snell at the Dodgers 2025 victory parade.

Following their series loss, Tampa Bay placed Blake Snell on the trade block and later sent him to the San Diego Padres for a major-league catcher and three minor-league prospects. Veteran pitcher Charlie Morton signed with the Atlanta Braves as a free agent after his club option was declined. Despite these losses, Tampa Bay still stayed a top team in the American League, winning 100 games for the first time as a franchise in 2021; however, they were upset by the Boston Red Sox in the ALDS. As for Snell, he would get his elusive postseason win in 2022 against the Dodgers while pitching for the Padres in Game 3 of the NLDS. Blake Snell would later join the opposing Los Angeles Dodgers by signing a five year deal in the 2024 offseason on November 30, reuniting him with Tyler Glasnow, who was traded from Tampa Bay to Los Angeles the year prior. In 2025, with the Dodgers, both would win their first championship. (Note: Glasnow was on the 2024 championship Dodgers team, but was injured and did not pitch in the postseason.) With Morton winning a championship on the 2021 Braves, this meant the top three starters for the 2020 Rays all went on to win a World Series.

The Rays played the entire World Series without making any errors, becoming the first team to do so in any World Series of six total games or more. Randy Arozarena's 10 home runs in the 2020 postseason is a record that still stands for any single postseason.

When the Rays returned to the World Series in 2026, just Yandy Diaz was the only remaining player from the 2020 team. (Note: Shane McClanahan was on the 2020 team as well, but he missed the 2026 postseason due to injury.) Trying to win their first World Series, they lost this series in five games to the Milwaukee Brewers, who were also seeking their first World Series win (the first time both participants shared this distinction since 1980).

== See also ==
- 2020 Japan Series
- 2020 Korean Series
