= Enrique Hernández (baseball) =

Puerto Rican baseball player (born 1991)

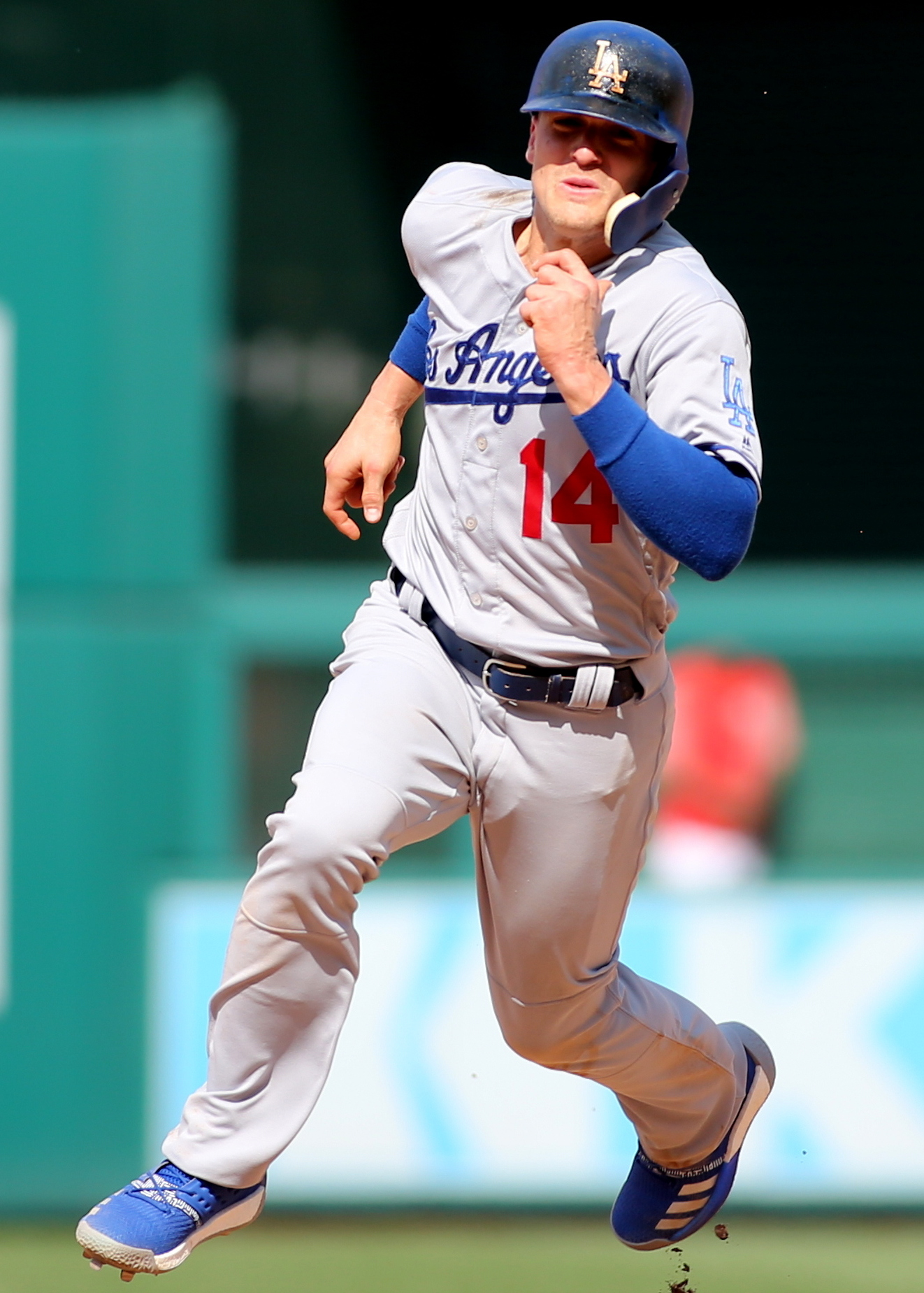
- Hernández with the Los Angeles Dodgers in 2018

Free agent
- Utility player
- Born: August 24, 1991 (age 35); San Juan, Puerto Rico
- Bats: Right Throws: Right

MLB debut
- July 1, 2014, for the Houston Astros

MLB statistics (through 2026 season)
- Batting average: .235
- Home runs: 134
- Runs batted in: 482
- Stats at Baseball Reference

Teams
- Houston Astros (2014); Miami Marlins (2014); Los Angeles Dodgers (2015–2020); Boston Red Sox (2021–2023); Los Angeles Dodgers (2023–2026)

Career highlights and awards
- 3× World Series champion (2020, 2024, 2025)
Medals
Men's baseball
Representing Puerto Rico
World Baseball Classic
| Silver medal – second place | 2017 Los Angeles | Team |

Enrique José Hernández González Jr. (born August 24, 1991), nicknamed Kike (/ˈkiːkeɪ/ KEE-kay), (Note: Hernández's nickname is often spelled Kiké in English-language media to avoid confusion with an anti-Semitic slur that has a different pronunciation.) is a Puerto Rican professional baseball utility player who is a free agent. He has previously played in Major League Baseball (MLB) for the Houston Astros, Miami Marlins, Los Angeles Dodgers, and Boston Red Sox.

The Astros drafted Hernández in the sixth round of the 2009 MLB draft, and he was called up to the majors for the first time in 2014. He has played every position except catcher in the majors, though he has spent the most time in the outfield and at second base. Over the course of his career, Hernández has become known for his play in the postseason, where he has tended to perform significantly better statistically than during the regular season. He was a member of the Dodgers' 2020, 2024, and 2025 World Series championship teams.

== Early life ==
Hernández was born in 1991, and is the eldest child of Enrique Hernández Sr., a scout for the Pittsburgh Pirates, and his wife Mónica González, owner of a boutique in Toa Baja, Puerto Rico. His mother is Cuban. He has two younger sisters. He began playing baseball at age six and participated in international youth tournaments in Venezuela and the Dominican Republic.

Hernández attended high school at the American Military Academy in Bayamón, Puerto Rico. Though he was 5 feet 6 inches (1.68 m) tall in his junior year, he grew 5 inches (130 mm) during his senior year.

== Professional career ==
=== Houston Astros ===
The Houston Astros drafted Hernández in the sixth round of the 2009 Major League Baseball draft. He earned a $150,000 signing bonus. In 2009, he played primarily second base and third base, and in 2010, he played exclusively second base.

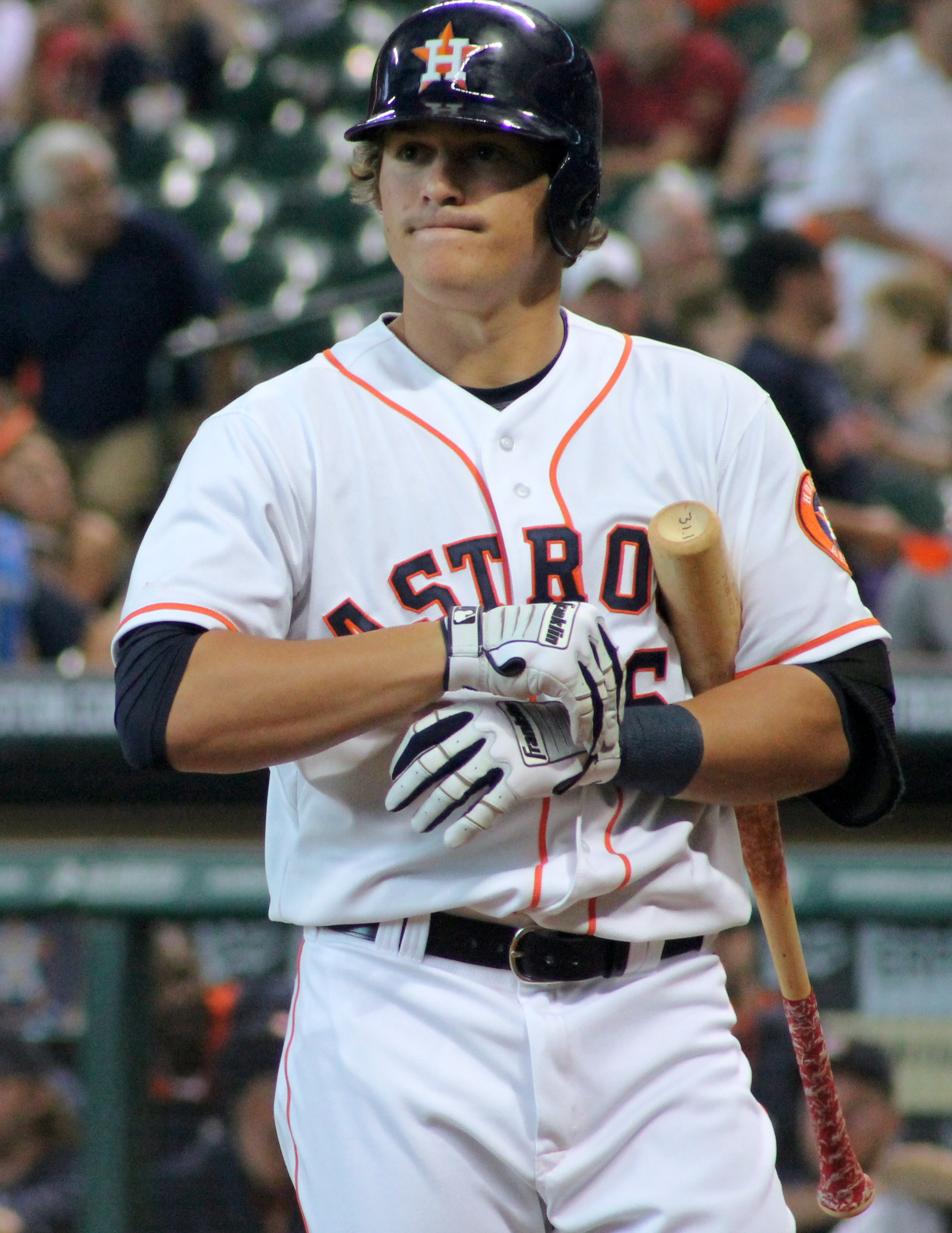
Hernández with the Houston Astros in 2014

Hernández was called up to the majors for the first time on July 1, 2014. He made his major league debut the same day, entering a game against the Seattle Mariners as a defensive replacement in the seventh inning and collecting two hits, the first of which was a ground-rule double in his first at-bat, off Dominic Leone of the Mariners. Hernández hit his first home run the following day, off Chris Young of the Mariners. In 24 games, he hit .284/.348/.420 for the Astros.

=== Miami Marlins ===
On July 31, 2014, the Astros traded Hernández, Jarred Cosart, and Austin Wates to the Miami Marlins for Jake Marisnick, Colin Moran, Francis Martes, and a compensatory draft pick. Playing for the Marlins on September 26, 2014, Hernández hit a ninth-inning grand slam off Craig Stammen of the Washington Nationals for his first career grand slam in the major leagues. Overall, Hernández appeared in 18 games for the Marlins and batted .175/.267/.425 (seven hits in 40 at bats).

=== Los Angeles Dodgers ===
==== 2015–2017 ====
On December 10, 2014, Hernández was traded to the Los Angeles Dodgers along with Chris Hatcher, Austin Barnes, and Andrew Heaney, in exchange for Dan Haren, Dee Gordon, Miguel Rojas, and cash. He was assigned to the AAA Oklahoma City Dodgers and was recalled by the Los Angeles Dodgers on April 28, 2015. He was used all over the field, with 20 games at second base, 19 in center field, 17 in left field, 16 at shortstop, two in right field and one at third base. In August, Hernández replaced a slumping Joc Pederson as the primary starting center fielder, though he missed much of September with a hamstring strain. He played in 76 games for the team in 2015, batting .307/.346/.490, with seven homers and 22 RBI. In 2015, he led all MLB hitters (60 or more plate appearances) in batting average against left-handers, at .423. During the season, he was known for his sense of humor and for wearing a banana suit in the dugout during games in which he was not playing.

In 2016, Hernández was less effective, hitting only .190/.283/.324 with seven homers and 18 RBI in 109 games. He was left off the roster for the first round of the playoffs and was hitless in eight at-bats in the 2016 National League Championship Series.

In 2017, he batted .215/.308/.421 in 297 at bats, with 11 home runs and 37 RBIs, while playing at least one inning at every position except pitcher or catcher. In the 2017 National League Division Series, he had one hit, a double, in three at-bats. In the fifth game of the 2017 National League Championship Series, he hit three home runs, including a grand slam, and drove in seven runs to tie the record for most RBI in a postseason game, helping send the Dodgers to the World Series for the first time since 1988. In the World Series, he had three hits in 13 at-bats (.231 average) as the Dodgers lost to the Houston Astros in seven games.

==== 2018–2020 ====
Hernández was eligible for salary arbitration for the first time after the season, and in January 2018 signed a one-year, $1.6 million contract for 2018.

On July 25, 2018, Hernández pitched in a game for the first time in his career, entering in the 16th inning against the Philadelphia Phillies and picking up the loss after walking two batters and giving up a three-run walk-off home run. He was the first position player since Babe Ruth to play in the infield, outfield and give up three runs or more in the same game. He was also the first position player ever to give up a walk-off home run. For the season, he batted .256/.336/.470, hitting a career-high 21 home runs and 52 RBIs. In the postseason, he was two for 12 in the NLDS against the Atlanta Braves, one for 14 in the NLCS against the Milwaukee Brewers and two for 15 in the 2018 World Series against the Boston Red Sox, with one home run.

On April 19, 2019, Hernández became the first player to hit a home run off Josh Hader on an 0–2 count. The Milwaukee Brewers pitcher had previously gone up 0–2 on 82 batters and held them to a .049 batting average. On August 22, 2019, Hernández hit his first career walk-off hit in the team's 3–2 win against the Toronto Blue Jays. He would finish the season batting .237/.304/.411 with 17 home runs and a career-high 62 RBIs.

Prior to the 2020 season, Hernández agreed with the Dodgers on a one-year, $5.9 million, contract, avoiding arbitration. On July 23, 2020, Hernández drove in five runs in an Opening Day 8–1 win against the San Francisco Giants. He played in 48 games during the Dodgers' pandemic-shortened 2020 season, hitting .230/.270/.410 with five home runs and 20 RBIs. He was hitless in five at-bats in the 2020 NLDS. In Game 7 of the 2020 National League Championship Series, Hernández hit a game-tying solo home run in the sixth inning. With the home run, Hernández also became the first player to pinch hit a game-tying or go-ahead home run in a winner-take-all postseason game. Overall, he had 14 at-bats in the series, with four hits (two of them home runs). In the 2020 World Series against the Tampa Bay Rays, Hernández had two hits in 10 at-bats as the Dodgers won the championship.

Hernández was the last Dodger to wear number 14 before it was retired for Gil Hodges on June 4, 2022.

=== Boston Red Sox ===
On February 2, 2021, Hernández signed a two-year, $14 million contract with the Boston Red Sox. He began the season as Boston's primary center fielder, while also seeing time at second base. On May 7, Hernández was placed on the 10-day injured list with a right hamstring strain. On May 17, he played for the Worcester Red Sox on a rehabilitation assignment. He hit two home runs in the game, including the first grand slam in the team's history. Hernández returned to Boston's lineup the following day. He was named the AL Player of the Week after hitting .400 with nine RBIs during July 19–25. Hernández missed several games from late August into early September due to being on the COVID-19 related injured list. Overall during the regular season, Hernández played in 134 games for Boston, batting .250 with 20 home runs and 60 RBIs. He also appeared in 11 postseason games, batting 20-for-49 (.408). On October 11, Hernández hit a sacrifice fly in Game 4 of the ALDS to send the Red Sox to the American League Championship Series. During the final three games of the Division Series and first two games of the League Championship Series, Hernández set a new MLB record for the most total bases in a five-game playoff span, with 34; it also set a new Red Sox franchise record for the most total bases in any five-game span.

Hernández was Boston's starting center fielder for Opening Day in 2022. He missed the game of May 6 due to briefly being on the COVID-related list. On June 8, he was placed on the 10-day injured list due to a right hip flexor strain. On July 23, he was transferred to the 60-day injured list. He rejoined the team on August 16. On September 6, the Red Sox announced that Hernández signed a one-year, $10 million contract extension for the 2023 season. For the 2022 season, Hernández played in 93 games for Boston while batting .222 with six home runs and 45 RBIs.

Prior to the 2023 season, with longtime shortstop Xander Bogaerts gone, Hernández emerged as a leader in the Red Sox clubhouse. He was involved in recruiting former Dodgers teammates Justin Turner and Kenley Jansen to Boston. With both the departure of Bogaerts, and the injury of Trevor Story, Hernández was named to be the Red Sox starting shortstop come opening day. After 46 games starting at shortstop, manager Alex Cora announced that the team was removing him from the position. At the time of the announcement, Hernández led the majors with 14 errors. However, multiple injuries for the Red Sox soon made them move Hernández back to the position, as well as some starts at second base. He played in 86 games for the Red Sox in 2023, batting .222 with 6 home runs and 31 RBI.

=== Los Angeles Dodgers (second stint) ===
On July 25, 2023, the Red Sox traded Hernández back to the Dodgers in exchange for Nick Robertson and Justin Hagenman. Hernández returned wearing the number 8, as in the time he was gone, his old number 14 was retired by the Dodgers in honor of Gil Hodges. In 54 games with the Dodgers, he hit .262 with five homers and 30 RBI, he also had three hits in eight at-bats in the 2023 NLDS. He became a free agent following the season and re-signed with the Dodgers on February 26 on a one-year, $4 million contract. He played in 126 games in 2024, appearing at every position except catcher and right field, though getting most of his time at third base while Max Muncy was on the injured list. He hit .229 with 12 homers and 52 RBI.

In the 2024 postseason, Hernández had three hits in nine at-bats with a home run in the 2024 NLDS, seven hits in 24 at-bats with a home run and four RBI, as well as three walks in the 2024 NLCS and in the 2024 World Series, he had five hits in 18 at-bats. In the clinching Game 5, Hernández led off the fifth inning with a hit off Gerrit Cole (Cole's first hit allowed in the game), then was able to beat out throws at second and third during the inning and score on an infield hit to set the stage for the Dodgers five-run comeback in that inning. Later, in the eighth inning, he again singled to lead off the inning and scored on a sacrifice fly to tie up the game, which the Dodgers eventually won for his second championship.

On February 11, 2025, Hernández re-signed with the Dodgers on a one-year, $6.5 million contract. He struggled in the first half of the 2025 season and eventually was placed on the injured list on July 7 with inflammation in his elbow, which he said had affected his swing. The injury kept him out of action until August 25. He wound up batting .203 in 92 games on the season, his lowest numbers since the 2016 season, while hitting 10 home runs and driving in 35 RBI.

In the 2025 postseason, Hernández was the Dodgers starting left fielder. He had four hits in eight at-bats in the Wild Card Series, three hits in 14 at-bats in the 2025 NLDS, four hits (including two doubles) in the 2025 NLCS and five hits (including a home run) in 28 at-bats in the 2025 World Series. He won his third championship as a member of the Dodgers and set a new franchise record for most postseason games played. After the World Series, he was once again a free agent and underwent surgery to repair a torn muscle in his left elbow that had been bothering him for most of the previous season.

On February 12, 2026, Hernández re-signed with the Dodgers on a one-year, $4.5 million contract. He began the season on the 60-day injured list while rehabbing from his offseason procedure and was not reinstated to the active roster until May 25. However, Hernández suffered a left oblique strain after two games back and returned to the injured list. He rejoined the team on July 28 and batted .222 in 41 games over the season with four home runs and 12 RBI.

== International career ==
Hernández played for the Puerto Rico national baseball team in the 2017 World Baseball Classic, where he won a silver medal.

On October 29, 2018, he was selected to form part of the MLB All-Star team for the 2018 MLB Japan All-Star Series.

In October 2022, it was announced that Hernández once again would represent Team Puerto Rico in the 2023 World Baseball Classic. He batted .300 over Puerto Rico's five games, adding two doubles and four RBI in the tournament.

He missed the 2026 World Baseball Classic due to injury.

== Personal life ==
Hernández and his wife, Mariana, married in December 2018 in San Juan, Puerto Rico. They welcomed a daughter in January 2021 and a son in 2026.

During an episode of the baseball podcast On Base with Mookie Betts, Hernández revealed that he has attention deficit hyperactivity disorder (ADHD), referring to it as both his "superpower" and "kryptonite" when asked to what he attributes his continued postseason success.

== See also ==
- List of Major League Baseball players from Puerto Rico
