= Tony Gonsolin =

American baseball player (born 1994)

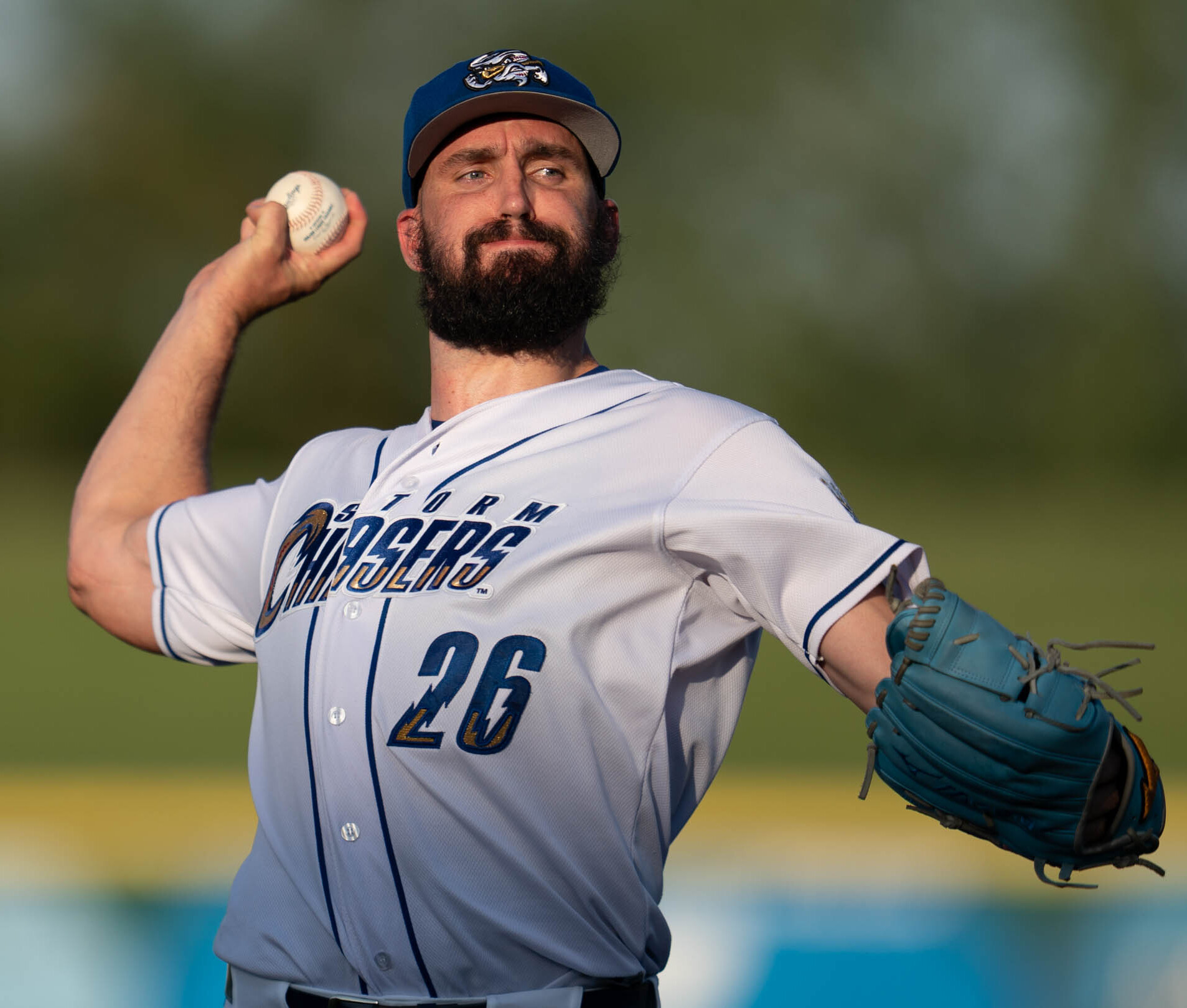
- Gonsolin with the Omaha Storm Chasers in 2026

Kansas City Royals – No. 26
- Pitcher
- Born: May 14, 1994 (age 32); Vacaville, California, U.S.
- Bats: Right Throws: Right

MLB debut
- June 26, 2019, for the Los Angeles Dodgers

MLB statistics (through 2026 season)
- Win–loss record: 37–13
- Earned run average: 3.43
- Strikeouts: 392
- Stats at Baseball Reference

Teams
- Los Angeles Dodgers (2019–2023, 2025); Kansas City Royals (2026–present)

Career highlights and awards
- All-Star (2022); World Series champion (2020)

Anthony Dennis Gonsolin (born May 14, 1994) is an American professional baseball pitcher for the Kansas City Royals of Major League Baseball (MLB). He has previously played in MLB for the Los Angeles Dodgers. Gonsolin played college baseball for the Saint Mary's Gaels and was selected by the Dodgers in the ninth round of the 2016 MLB draft. He made his MLB debut in 2019.

== Early life and amateur career ==
Gonsolin attended Vacaville High School in Vacaville, California. As a senior, he went 4–1 with a 2.60 earned run average (ERA). After going undrafted in the 2012 MLB draft, Gonsolin played college baseball at St. Mary's College of California.

In summer 2015, Gonsolin played for the Madison Mallards of the Northwoods League. Although he pitched 14.1 innings over the summer stint, he was primarily an outfielder for the Mallards. As a position player, he was named a Northwoods League All-Star, posting a .316 batting average (.913 OPS) across 293 plate appearances, hitting 11 home runs and stealing 16 bases.

As a senior with the Gaels in 2016, he pitched to a 3–3 record with a 3.86 ERA in 18 games. He was drafted by the Los Angeles Dodgers in the ninth round of the 2016 MLB draft.

== Professional career ==
=== Los Angeles Dodgers ===
==== Minor leagues ====
Gonsolin spent his first professional season with the rookie-level Ogden Raptors and Single-A Great Lakes Loons, pitching to a combined 1–2 record with a 3.77 ERA and 25 strikeouts in 19 relief appearances. He spent 2017 with Great Lakes and the High-A Rancho Cucamonga Quakes, where he went 7–6 with a 3.86 ERA and 85 strikeouts in 42 games. After spending his first two seasons as a relief pitcher, Gonsolin was converted into a starter in 2018. He started the season with Rancho Cucamonga and was promoted to the Double-A Tulsa Drillers during the season. In 26 starts with both affiliates, Gonsolin went 10–2 with a 2.60 ERA and 155 strikeouts over 128 innings. The Dodgers named him as the organization's minor league pitcher of the year for 2018.

==== Major leagues ====
Gonsolin began 2019 with the Oklahoma City Dodgers and was called up to the Dodgers on June 26 to make his debut as the starting pitcher against the Arizona Diamondbacks. He pitched four innings, allowing six runs (four earned) on six hits with three strikeouts. He also singled to center field in his first major league at bat. On July 30, in his second MLB game, Gonsolin picked up his first career save against the Colorado Rockies after pitching four innings of relief in a 9–4 win. On August 5, Gonsolin picked up his first major league win after pitching six shutout innings against the St. Louis Cardinals. He allowed only two hits and one walk, while striking out seven batters. He pitched 40 innings in 11 games for the Dodgers, with six starts, and finished with a 4–2 record and a 2.93 ERA.

In the pandemic-shortened 2020 regular season, Gonsolin went 2–2 with a 2.31 ERA, in nine games (eight starts) during which he struck out 46 batters in 46 2/3 innings. In the postseason, he made two appearances in the NLCS, starting game two and appearing in relief in game seven. He pitched a total of 6 1/3 innings, allowing seven runs and picking up the loss in game two. In the World Series, he was selected by Dodgers manager Dave Roberts to start Game 2, on two days' rest, against the Tampa Bay Rays. He only pitched 1 1/3 innings in the game and allowed one earned run on one hit and one walk as he was awarded the loss in the game. He also got the start in Game 6 and this time pitched 1 2/3 innings while allowing one run on three hits and two walks; however, the Dodgers came from behind to win that game and clinch the championship. Gonsolin received eleven votes in 2020 National League Rookie of the Year voting, finishing in fourth place. On October 26, 2020, Baseball America named Gonsolin its 2020 Rookie of the Year.

Gonsolin began the 2021 season on the Opening Day roster but did not appear in a game before he was placed on the injured list on April 4 with right shoulder inflammation. After a few rehab starts, he was activated on June 9 to rejoin the Dodgers starting rotation. His shoulder started hurting again towards the end of July and he was put back on the injured list on July 31. After missing another month, he returned on September 9. He made 13 starts (and two relief appearances) for the Dodgers in 2021, with a 4–1 record and a 3.23 ERA. Gonsolin made three relief appearances in the 2021 NLCS, allowing five runs on five hits in four innings.

After starting the 2022 season with 11 wins and no losses and a 2.02 ERA, Gonsolin was selected to the 2022 Major League Baseball All-Star Game. However, he allowed three runs on four hits (including two home runs) to pick up the loss in the game. At the end of August, Gonsolin was placed on the injured list with a forearm strain. He spent the next month recovering and did not return until he made a start on October 3, the second to last day of the regular season. Despite this, his season numbers were a career best. He finished 16–1 with a 2.14 ERA and 119 strikeouts. He started Game 3 of the NLDS and gave up a run in 1 1/3 innings, taking the loss, and the favored Dodgers went on to lose the series to the Padres.

On January 31, 2023, Gonsolin signed a two-year, $6.65 million, contract to avoid salary arbitration. However, an ankle injury in spring training led to him beginning the season on the injured list. He rejoined the Dodgers rotation on April 26. He made 20 starts with the Dodgers in 2023, with an 8–5 record and 4.98 ERA but on August 18 against the Miami Marlins he allowed 10 earned runs in 3 1/3 innings, including five home runs, tying a team record for most home runs allowed in a game. The following day, he was placed on the injured list with right forearm inflammation. The team said Gonsolin had been dealing with arm issues all year and he was unlikely to pitch again during the season. On August 28, it was confirmed that he would undergo Tommy John surgery, ending his season.

Gonsolin spent the 2024 season recovering from his surgery, appearing only in three rehab games in the minor leagues. Despite his injury, Gonsolin signed a $5.4 million contract with the Dodgers for 2025 to avoid salary arbitration.

Gonsolin began the 2025 season on the injured list after suffering a back injury while lifting weights during spring training. He finally rejoined the Dodgers starting rotation on April 30 and made seven starts with a 3–2 record and 5.00 ERA. On June 7, Gonsolin was placed back on the injured list for right elbow discomfort and on August 12 it was revealed that he had an internal brace and flexor repair surgery on his shoulder, ending his chances of returning during the 2025 season. Gonsolin was designated for assignment by the Dodgers on November 6. He cleared waivers and elected free agency on November 12.

=== Kansas City Royals ===
On August 13, 2026, Gonsolin signed a major league contract with the Kansas City Royals that included a club option for the 2027 season.

== See also ==
- List of World Series starting pitchers
