= Mike Gallego =

American baseball player & coach (born 1960)

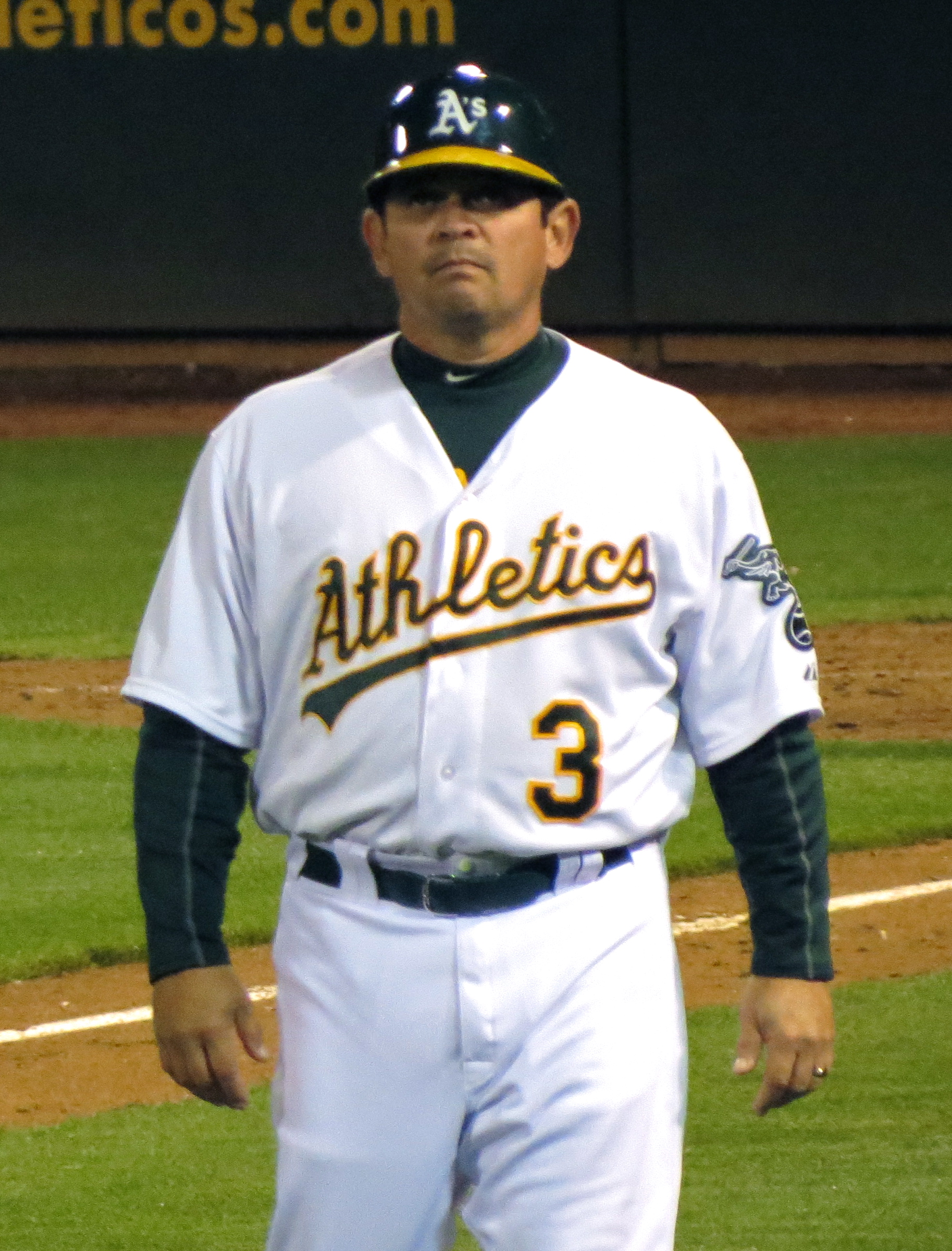
- Gallego with the Oakland Athletics
- Infielder
- Born: October 31, 1960 (age 65); Whittier, California, U.S.
- Batted: Right Threw: Right

MLB debut
- April 11, 1985, for the Oakland Athletics

Last MLB appearance
- July 23, 1997, for the St. Louis Cardinals

MLB statistics
- Batting average: .239
- Home runs: 42
- Runs batted in: 282
- Stats at Baseball Reference

Teams
- As player: Oakland Athletics (1985–1991); New York Yankees (1992–1994); Oakland Athletics (1995); St. Louis Cardinals (1996–1997); As coach: Colorado Rockies (2002, 2005–2008); Oakland Athletics (2009–2015); Los Angeles Angels (2019–2022)

Career highlights and awards
- World Series champion (1989)

Michael Anthony Gallego (born October 31, 1960) is an American former professional baseball player and current coach. He played in Major League Baseball (MLB) as an infielder from 1985 to 1997, most notably as a member of the Oakland Athletics team that won three consecutive American League pennants and a World Series championship in 1989. He also played for the New York Yankees and the St. Louis Cardinals. After his playing career, Gallego served as an MLB coach.

== Playing career ==
Gallego was born in Whittier, California, of Mexican descent. Before playing professionally, he graduated from St. Paul High School, where he lettered in baseball and football, and then attended the University of California, Los Angeles (1978–81, history major). Gallego played on the United States national baseball team at the 1979 Pan American Games.

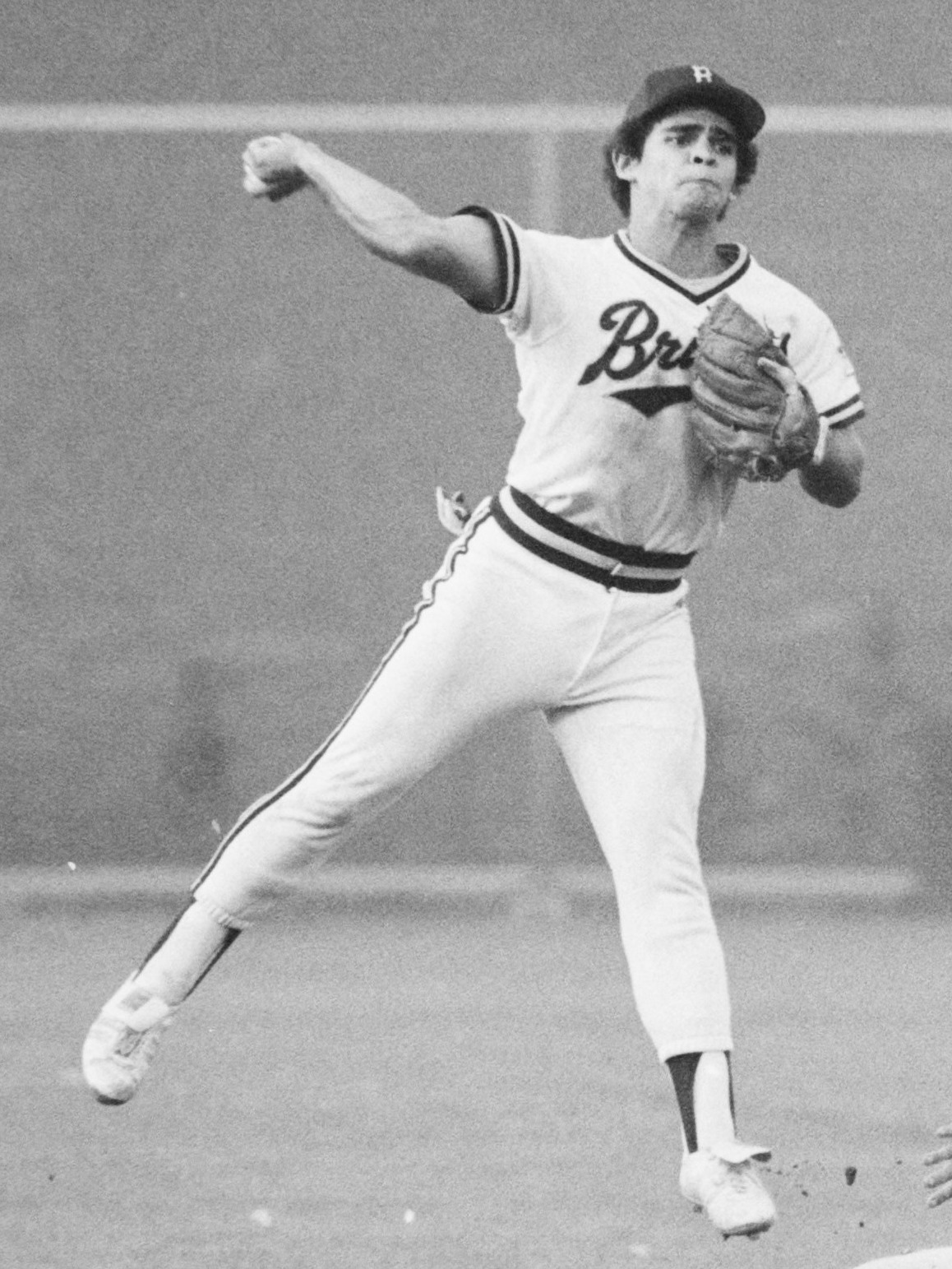
Gallego with UCLA during Haarlem Baseball Week in 1980

Gallego was the Athletics' starting second baseman during their three-year run of American League (AL) championships from 1988 through 1990, which included a World Series sweep in 1989 against their Bay Area rivals, the San Francisco Giants. Throughout his career, he was known more for his glove than his bat. In 1990, he led the AL in sacrifice hits with 17. He had 28 hits without an extra-base hit in 1995, still the post-1912 nonpitcher record. Gallego's 12 home runs in 1991 set a career high.

While playing with the Yankees from 1992 to 1994, Gallego was the last player to wear the uniform number 2 prior to the Yankees' Hall of Fame shortstop, Derek Jeter. Upon his return to the Oakland A's in 1987, Gallego refused to give up uniform number 9 that Reggie Jackson had worn previously with the A's, forcing Jackson to wear number 44 for his final season.

Gallego closed out his career with the Cardinals in 1996 and 1997, where he once again played under Tony La Russa, his manager while with the A's.

== Coaching career ==
Gallego was named the Colorado Rockies third base coach and infield coach in December 2004 and coached until October 7, 2008. He was hired as the A's third base coach and infield instructor during the 2008 offseason. He was dismissed on August 24, 2015.

On November 25, 2015, Gallego was announced as director of baseball development for the Los Angeles Angels of Anaheim. He was promoted to third base coach for the 2019 season and to bench coach prior to the 2020 season. He remained with the Angels' MLB coaching staff through the 2022 season, then was reassigned within the organization.

== Personal life ==
Gallego and his wife Caryn have three children, Joe, Niko, and Ali. His son Niko also played for UCLA baseball and was signed with the Arizona Diamondbacks in July 2010. Niko helped the Bruins to the Championship Series of the 2010 College World Series, where they lost to South Carolina for the national championship. Following his graduation from UCLA, Niko began playing for the Visalia Rawhide of the California League. He is the uncle of Los Angeles Dodgers catcher Austin Barnes.
