= 2020 National League Championship Series =

Team (Wins)	Managers	Season
Los Angeles Dodgers (4)	Dave Roberts	43–17 (.717), GA: 6
Atlanta Braves (3)	Brian Snitker	35–25 (.583), GA: 4
- Dates: October 12–18
- MVP: Corey Seager (Los Angeles)
- Umpires: Cory Blaser, Pat Hoberg, James Hoye, Dan Iassogna, Will Little, Alan Porter, and Jim Reynolds (crew chief)

Broadcast
- Television: Fox (Games 1, 4, and 7); FS1 (Games 2–7)
- TV announcers: Joe Buck (Games 1–6), Joe Davis (Game 7), John Smoltz, Ken Rosenthal, and Tom Verducci
- Radio: ESPN
- Radio announcers: Jon Sciambi and Jessica Mendoza
- NLDS: Los Angeles Dodgers over San Diego Padres (3–0); Atlanta Braves over Miami Marlins (3–0)

The 2020 National League Championship Series was the best-of-seven series in Major League Baseball’s 2020 postseason between the two National League Division Series winners, the second-seeded Atlanta Braves and the overall #1 seed Los Angeles Dodgers, for the National League (NL) pennant and the right to play in the 2020 World Series. Due to the COVID-19 pandemic, all games for the series were held at a neutral site, Globe Life Field in Arlington, Texas. The series was the 51st in league history. The games were televised nationally by Fox and FS1. The Dodgers defeated the Braves in seven games, winning their third National League pennant in four seasons. The Dodgers were the fourteenth team in postseason history to come back from a 3–1 series deficit. Los Angeles then went on to win their first World Series in 32 years against the Tampa Bay Rays in six games.

== Background ==
Due to the COVID-19 pandemic, the MLB season was reduced to 60 games. As part of a special postseason format, playoff berths were made available for eight teams in each league: three division winners, three division runners-up, and two wild card teams. With no first round byes for division winners, all teams were required to play in a Wild Card series.

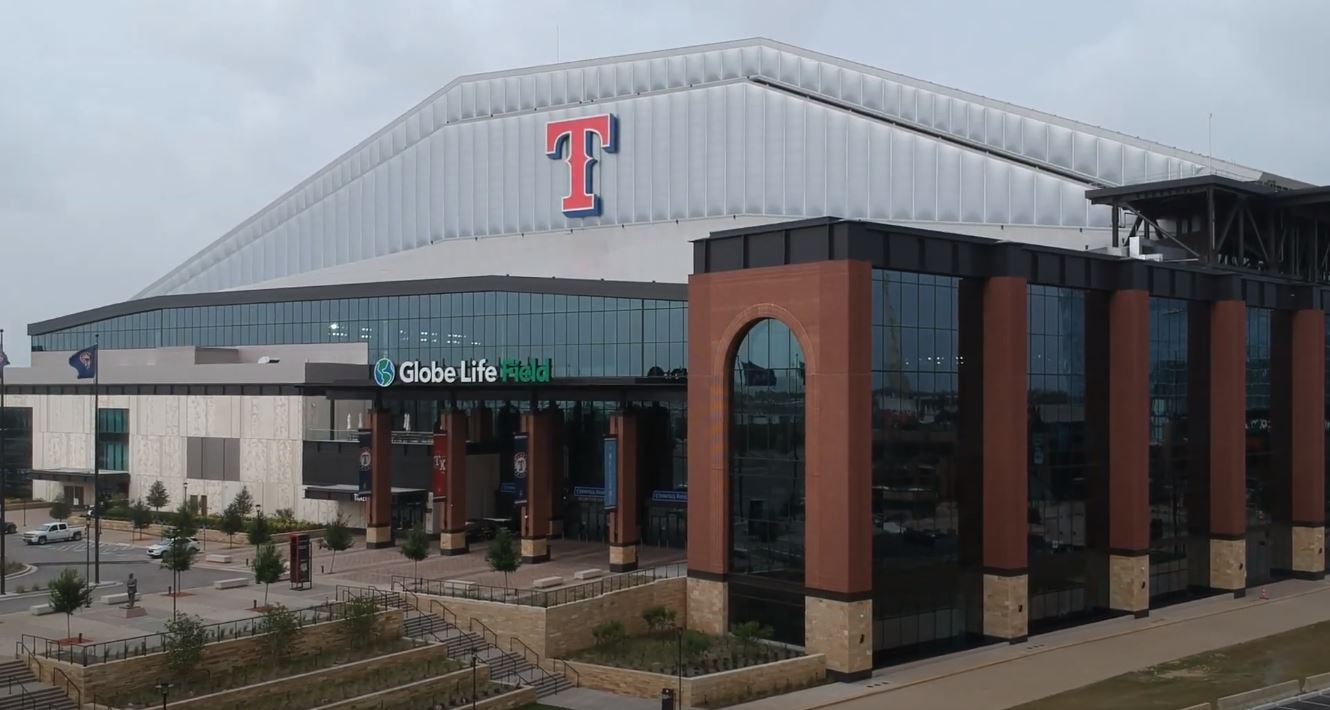
Globe Life Field

As part of the terms set for the postseason, all games of the Championship Series are played at a neutral site at Globe Life Field in Arlington, Texas. This is the first National League Championship Series to take place exclusively at a neutral site. Both teams stayed at the Four Seasons Resort and Club Dallas at Las Colinas as the designated bubble hotel.

This was the fourth postseason meeting between the Braves and Dodgers. The previous three match-ups were the 1996 National League Division Series, 2013 National League Division Series, and 2018 National League Division Series, with Atlanta winning the former and Los Angeles winning the latter two. Although considered regular-season games, the two teams also met in the 1959 National League tie-breaker series, with the Dodgers winning the series 2–0 to advance to the 1959 World Series. The Braves were formerly an NL West member for 25 years (1969–1993); the Braves and Dodgers finished 1–2 in the standings in 1982, 1983, and 1991, all of which came down to the final week of the season. The Braves and Dodgers were the World Champions of the two most recently shortened and completed MLB seasons prior to 2020; 1995 for Atlanta and 1981 for Los Angeles.

The 2020 Dodgers started the season 30–10, matching their best 40-game start in franchise history. The last such Dodgers start came in 1977, along with the Brooklyn teams in 1888 and 1955. This was also the best 40-game start in the majors since the 116-win Mariners began the 2001 season 31–9. The Dodgers finished the regular season 43–17 (.717), won their eighth straight division title, and swept both the Milwaukee Brewers and San Diego Padres to get to the NLCS. This was the Dodgers' fourth appearance in the National League Championship Series in five seasons, fifth in eight seasons, and fourteenth overall. By virtue of their regular season record, the best in the league, the Dodgers were guaranteed to have "home-field" advantage throughout the entire postseason.

For the Braves, 2020 marked their first NLCS appearance since 2001. Atlanta was highlighted by a league-leading offense led by four 2020 Silver Slugger Award winners — Freddie Freeman (also the 2020 National League MVP), Ronald Acuña Jr., and offseason free agent signees Marcell Ozuna and Travis d'Arnaud. In their game against the Miami Marlins on September 9, the Braves scored 29 runs, one short of the MLB record set by the Texas Rangers in 2007. On September 22, the Braves clinched the NL East for the third straight year with a 11–1 over the Miami Marlins. Then, they swept the Cincinnati Reds in the 2020 National League Wild Card Series for their first postseason series win since the 2001 season and swept the Marlins in three games in the NLDS. This was the Braves' twelfth overall NLCS appearance.

The Braves led MLB in hits (556), doubles (130), runs batted in (338), on-base percentage (.349), on-base plus slugging (.832), total bases (1,001) and plate appearances (2,344). For the third consecutive year, the Dodgers led the National League in runs scored and fewest runs allowed. They also led MLB in home runs.

Due to a temporary realignment of teams based on geographic proximity, the Dodgers and Braves did not play each other in the regular season.

This series was the first time all season that a limited number of spectators were allowed to attend the games.

== Summary ==
Los Angeles won the series, 4–3.

Game	Date	Score	Location	Time	Attendance
1	October 12	Atlanta Braves – 5, Los Angeles Dodgers – 1	Globe Life Field	3:22	10,700
2	October 13	Atlanta Braves – 8, Los Angeles Dodgers – 7	Globe Life Field	4:12	10,624
3	October 14	Los Angeles Dodgers – 15, Atlanta Braves – 3	Globe Life Field	4:15	10,664
4	October 15	Los Angeles Dodgers – 2, Atlanta Braves – 10	Globe Life Field	3:43	11,044
5	October 16	Los Angeles Dodgers – 7, Atlanta Braves – 3	Globe Life Field	3:45	11,119
6	October 17	Atlanta Braves – 1, Los Angeles Dodgers – 3	Globe Life Field	3:20	10,772
7	October 18	Atlanta Braves – 3, Los Angeles Dodgers – 4	Globe Life Field	3:37	10,920

== Game summaries ==
Note that both teams had a player named "Will Smith"—a pitcher for Atlanta and a catcher for Los Angeles.

=== Game 1 ===
October 12, 2020 7:08 pm (CDT) at Globe Life Field in Arlington, Texas
Team	1	2	3	4	5	6	7	8	9	R	H	E
Atlanta	1	0	0	0	0	0	0	0	4	5	8	0
Los Angeles	0	0	0	0	1	0	0	0	0	1	4	0
WP: Will Smith (1–0) LP: Blake Treinen (0–1); Home runs: ATL: Freddie Freeman (1), Austin Riley (1), Ozzie Albies (1); LAD: Enrique Hernández (1); Attendance: 10,700; Boxscore

The game was a pitchers' duel between Walker Buehler and Max Fried, both of whom allowed only one run on solo homers (Freddie Freeman for the Braves and Kiké Hernández for the Dodgers). However, the Dodgers bullpen gave up the game in the ninth inning with Blake Treinen allowing the go-ahead homer to Austin Riley and then Ozzie Albies hit a two-run homer off Jake McGee to put the game out of reach as the Braves won, 5–1. Mark Melancon, warming up in the bullpen, looked up and caught Albies's ninth-inning home run ball on the fly.

=== Game 2 ===
October 13, 2020 5:05 pm (CDT) at Globe Life Field in Arlington, Texas
Team	1	2	3	4	5	6	7	8	9	R	H	E
Atlanta	0	0	0	2	4	0	1	0	1	8	10	1
Los Angeles	0	0	0	0	0	0	3	0	4	7	10	0
WP: Tyler Matzek (1–0) LP: Tony Gonsolin (0–1) Sv: Mark Melancon (1); Home runs: ATL: Freddie Freeman (2), Ozzie Albies (2); LAD: Corey Seager (1), Max Muncy (1); Attendance: 10,624; Boxscore

Clayton Kershaw was originally scheduled to start Game 2 but he was scratched due to back spasms. Rookie Tony Gonsolin started instead. Freeman opened the scoring in the fourth with a two-run homer. With one out in the fifth, Gonsolin and Pedro Baez combined to allow four walks and two hits as Atlanta took a 6–0 lead. After Ian Anderson and Tyler Matzek started the game with six scoreless innings, the Dodgers came back against the Braves bullpen. Corey Seager hit a three-run homer in the seventh, making it 7–3. In the top of the ninth, a home run by Ozzie Albies added what turned out to be a crucial insurance run. For the second night in a row, Mark Melancon was warming up in the Braves' bullpen and caught Albies's home run on the fly. The Dodgers staged a rally in the bottom of the ninth, thanks to a double by Seager, a homer by Max Muncy and a triple by Cody Bellinger. However, the Braves held on to win 8–7 to take a two games to none lead in the series.

=== Game 3 ===
October 14, 2020 5:05 pm (CDT) at Globe Life Field in Arlington, Texas
Team	1	2	3	4	5	6	7	8	9	R	H	E
Los Angeles	11	1	3	0	0	0	0	0	0	15	16	0
Atlanta	0	0	1	0	0	0	0	0	2	3	7	0
WP: Julio Urías (1–0) LP: Kyle Wright (0–1); Home runs: LAD: Joc Pederson (1), Edwin Ríos (1), Max Muncy (2), Cody Bellinger (1), Corey Seager (2); ATL: Cristian Pache (1); Attendance: 10,664; Boxscore

In Game 3, the Dodgers jumped on Braves starter Kyle Wright early, scoring 11 runs in the first inning with Edwin Ríos hitting a solo homer, Joc Pederson a three-run homer and Max Muncy a grand slam, aided by a lead off overturned out call on Mookie Betts into an infield single (had the call stood, it would have been a shutout inning). They added on with a Cody Bellinger home run in the second followed by a Corey Seager homer in the third. Julio Urías allowed only one run in his five innings of work, with five strikeouts. The 11 runs in the first inning set a new MLB record for the most runs ever scored by one team in any inning of a postseason game. The Dodgers won the game 15–3.

=== Game 4 ===
October 15, 2020 7:08 pm (CDT) at Globe Life Field in Arlington, Texas
Team	1	2	3	4	5	6	7	8	9	R	H	E
Los Angeles	0	0	1	0	0	0	1	0	0	2	3	2
Atlanta	0	0	0	1	0	6	1	2	X	10	14	0
WP: Bryse Wilson (1–0) LP: Clayton Kershaw (0–1); Home runs: LAD: Edwin Ríos (2); ATL: Marcell Ozuna 2 (2); Attendance: 11,044; Boxscore

Clayton Kershaw, who was originally scheduled to start Game 2, started for the Dodgers. For the Braves, rookie Bryse Wilson took the mound. Wilson was making only his eighth career start, and his first in the postseason. It was a pitchers' duel going into the sixth inning, with each starting pitcher giving up a solo home run (Wilson to Edwin Ríos and Kershaw to Marcell Ozuna). For Wilson, the home run was the only hit he allowed in six innings of work. In the bottom of the sixth inning, the Braves broke the game open with six runs, and eleven batters coming to the plate. As a result of this 10–2 victory, the Braves were one victory away from the 2020 World Series.

=== Game 5 ===
October 16, 2020 8:08 pm (CDT) at Globe Life Field in Arlington, Texas
Team	1	2	3	4	5	6	7	8	9	R	H	E
Los Angeles	0	0	0	1	0	3	3	0	0	7	9	0
Atlanta	1	1	0	0	0	0	0	1	0	3	7	0
WP: Blake Treinen (1–1) LP: Will Smith (1–1); Home runs: LAD: Corey Seager 2 (4), Will Smith (1); ATL: None; Attendance: 11,119; Boxscore

The Braves took a 2–0 lead after two innings off of Dustin May and the Braves' A. J. Minter struck out seven while allowing only one hit in three scoreless innings. A baserunning mistake cost the Braves a run in the bottom of the third inning when Marcell Ozuna was initially ruled to have scored after he safely touched home on a Dansby Swanson sacrifice fly to right that Mookie Betts caught near his feet in spectacular fashion; after an appeal play at third and an instant replay review, Ozuna was ruled out for failing to tag up (i.e., he did not retouch third base after Betts caught the ball) and the run was taken off the board on the inning-ending double play. The Dodgers got one back in the fourth on a solo homer by Corey Seager – the first batter after the overturned call – then took the lead in the sixth when Dodgers catcher Will Smith homered off Braves reliever Will Smith. This was the first matchup between two players of the same name in playoff history. Betts drove in a run with a single in the seventh, followed by a two-run homer by Seager, his second of the night. The Dodgers held on to win 7–3, to extend their season.

=== Game 6 ===
October 17, 2020 3:38 pm (CDT) at Globe Life Field in Arlington, Texas
Team	1	2	3	4	5	6	7	8	9	R	H	E
Atlanta	0	0	0	0	0	0	1	0	0	1	9	0
Los Angeles	3	0	0	0	0	0	0	0	X	3	9	1
WP: Walker Buehler (1–0) LP: Max Fried (0–1) Sv: Kenley Jansen (1); Home runs: ATL: None; LAD: Corey Seager (5), Justin Turner (1); Attendance: 10,772; Boxscore

In the sixth game of the series, the Dodgers got off to a strong start with three runs in the first off Max Fried, including solo homers by Corey Seager and Justin Turner. With his homer, Seager set a new record for the most home runs in the NLCS with five and passed Iván Rodríguez (2003) for most RBI in an NLCS with eleven. Buehler struck out six in six scoreless innings with help from Mookie Betts, who made another spectacular catch to rob Marcell Ozuna of extra bases in the fifth inning. Ronald Acuña Jr. doubled off the first reliever Blake Treinen to put the Braves on the board in the seventh inning. Fried did not allow any further runs as he went 6 2/3 innings, with eight hits and four walks allowed with five strikeouts. The Dodgers won 3–1 to force a seventh game.

=== Game 7 ===
For the television broadcast by Fox Sports, Joe Davis filled-in for regular play-by-play announcer Joe Buck, due to Buck's obligation to commentate NFL on Fox. By coincidence, Davis is the Dodgers' TV play-by-play announcer.

October 18, 2020 7:15 pm (CDT) at Globe Life Field in Arlington, Texas
Team	1	2	3	4	5	6	7	8	9	R	H	E
Atlanta	1	1	0	1	0	0	0	0	0	3	3	0
Los Angeles	0	0	2	0	0	1	1	0	X	4	10	0
WP: Julio Urías (2–0) LP: Chris Martin (0–1); Home runs: ATL: Dansby Swanson (1); LAD: Enrique Hernández (2), Cody Bellinger (2); Attendance: 10,920; Boxscore

Ian Anderson started Game 7 for the Braves opposite Dustin May, who served as an opener on one day's rest for the Dodgers. May walked a couple in the first and gave up the first run of the game on a single to Marcell Ozuna. Tony Gonsolin came in to pitch in the second and allowed a solo homer to Dansby Swanson. The Dodgers tied up the game in the third on a two-run single by Will Smith. In the fourth, Gonsolin walked the first two batters and then allowed an RBI single to Austin Riley to put the Braves back on top. However, the damage that inning was limited when, with runners on second and third and nobody out, Justin Turner fielded a Nick Markakis ground ball and alertly threw home to prevent Swanson from scoring; in the ensuing rundown, Turner dove to tag Swanson's shoe and then scrambled to his knees to throw out Riley trying to advance to third for an unusual 5–2–5–6 double play. For the third straight game, Mookie Betts made a game/series saving catch robbing Freddie Freeman of a home run in the fifth inning. In the sixth inning, Kiké Hernández homered off A. J. Minter to tie it back up. Cody Bellinger gave the Dodgers their first lead of the game on a solo homer off Chris Martin in the seventh inning. Julio Urías pitched the last three innings to pick up the win as the Dodgers held on for the 4–3 victory. He retired Riley on a flyout to Bellinger to end the Braves' season and win their third NL pennant in the last four seasons.

The Dodgers became the first team ever to win a League Championship Series after losing the first two games at what was considered "home field".

=== Composite line score ===
2020 NLCS (4–3): Los Angeles Dodgers beat Atlanta Braves

Team	1	2	3	4	5	6	7	8	9	R	H	E
Atlanta Braves	3	2	1	4	4	6	3	3	7	33	58	1
Los Angeles Dodgers	14	1	6	1	1	4	8	0	4	39	61	3
Total attendance: 75,843 Average attendance: 10,835

== Aftermath ==
Cody Bellinger dislocated his shoulder on a celebration near the dugout with Kiké Hernandez, after hitting the go-ahead and eventual game-winning and series clinching homerun in the seventh inning of Game 7. Bellinger would play injured during the World Series, but his dislocation was serious enough that it required off-season surgery. The aftermath of his surgery led to a late start to spring training and an overall dismal year from Bellinger in 2021, who also broke his leg in April, injured his hamstring in May, and fractured his ribs in September. Bellinger hit to .165/.240/.320 slash line in 2021, which was seen as one of the worst seasons for a former MVP in the prime years of his career. After nearly being left out of the postseason starting line-up, Bellinger returned to form by having a clutch postseason for the Dodgers. However, Bellinger would again struggle in 2022 and was non-tendered by Los Angeles after the season.

In the 2020 World Series, the Dodgers ended their 32-year drought, defeating the Tampa Bay Rays in six games. Corey Seager continued his hot hitting in the World Series, becoming the eighth player to win LCS and World Series MVP.

This series added to the lore of the Georgia sports curse, although the Braves would redeem themselves a year later. In their 2021 postseason run, Braves enacted some revenge by defeating the Dodgers in the National League Championship Series. It was Atlanta's first series win against Los Angeles since the 1996 National League Division Series, as they had previously lost their last three series against Los Angeles. In the series, long-time Dodger outfield Joc Pederson was a Braves player, due to being traded there from the Chicago Cubs near the trade deadline (Pederson had joined the Cubs as a free agent seeking more playing time against left-handed pitching). The Braves took control of the 2021 NLCS and did not let the Dodgers back into the series like 2020. They then defeated the Houston Astros in the World Series, the city's first championship since Atlanta United FC won the MLS Cup in 2018, and the first in one of the four major sports since 1995.

== See also ==
- 2020 American League Championship Series
