= 2020 American League Championship Series =

MLB Playoff matchup

Team (Wins)	Managers	Season
Tampa Bay Rays (4)	Kevin Cash	40–20 (.667), GA: 7
Houston Astros (3)	Dusty Baker	29–31 (.483), GB: 7
- Dates: October 11–17
- MVP: Randy Arozarena (Tampa Bay)
- Umpires: Lance Barksdale, Ted Barrett, Chris Conroy, Manny Gonzalez, Jeff Nelson (crew chief), Tim Timmons, and John Tumpane

Broadcast
- Television: TBS
- TV announcers: Brian Anderson, Ron Darling, Jeff Francoeur, and Lauren Shehadi
- Radio: ESPN
- Radio announcers: Dan Shulman and Chris Singleton
- ALDS: Tampa Bay Rays over New York Yankees (3–2); Houston Astros over Oakland Athletics (3–1)

The 2020 American League Championship Series was the best-of-seven series between the two American League Division Series winners, the defending American League Champion Houston Astros and the Tampa Bay Rays, for the American League (AL) pennant and the right to play in the 2020 World Series. Due to the COVID-19 pandemic, all games for the series were held behind closed doors at a neutral site at Petco Park in San Diego. The games were televised nationally by TBS.

The Rays won the series and their second American League pennant after defeating the Astros, 4–3. In this series, the Astros became just the second team to force a Game 7 in MLB postseason history after trailing a best-of-seven series 3–0, after the 2004 Red Sox.

The Rays would go on to lose to the Los Angeles Dodgers in the World Series in six games.

== Background ==
Due to the COVID-19 pandemic, the MLB season was reduced to 60 games. As part of a special postseason format, playoff berths were made available for eight teams in each league: three division winners, three division runners-up, and two wild card teams. With no first-round byes for division winners, all teams were required to play in a Wild Card series.

The Rays made their first ALCS appearance since 2008, where they defeated the Boston Red Sox in seven games. On September 23, the Rays clinched their third AL East division title and their first since 2010. They swept the Toronto Blue Jays in the 2020 American League Wild Card Series and beat the New York Yankees in the 2020 American League Division Series.

On September 25, by virtue of a Dodgers win over the Angels, the Astros clinched a playoff berth, making it their fourth consecutive postseason appearance, as well as their fifth in six years. The Astros finished the regular season at 29–31 (.483), becoming the second American League team to reach the playoffs with a losing record, the first being the 1981 Kansas City Royals. On September 30, the Astros became the first sub-.500 team to win a playoff series, eliminating the Minnesota Twins in a two-game sweep in the 2020 American League Wild Card Series after holding the typically potent Twins bats to zero home runs across the entire series. The Astros' win in Game 2 handed the Twins their 18th consecutive postseason loss, a drought dating back to 2004, and the longest such streak in all of North America's major professional sports. The Astros advanced to the ALDS where they defeated the Oakland Athletics in a four-game upset, scoring a historic 33 runs (and 12 home runs) across 35 innings, and advancing to their fourth straight ALCS. The Astros became the first team to participate in an LCS with a losing record. This was the Astros' eighth overall LCS appearance (four each in the NL and AL).

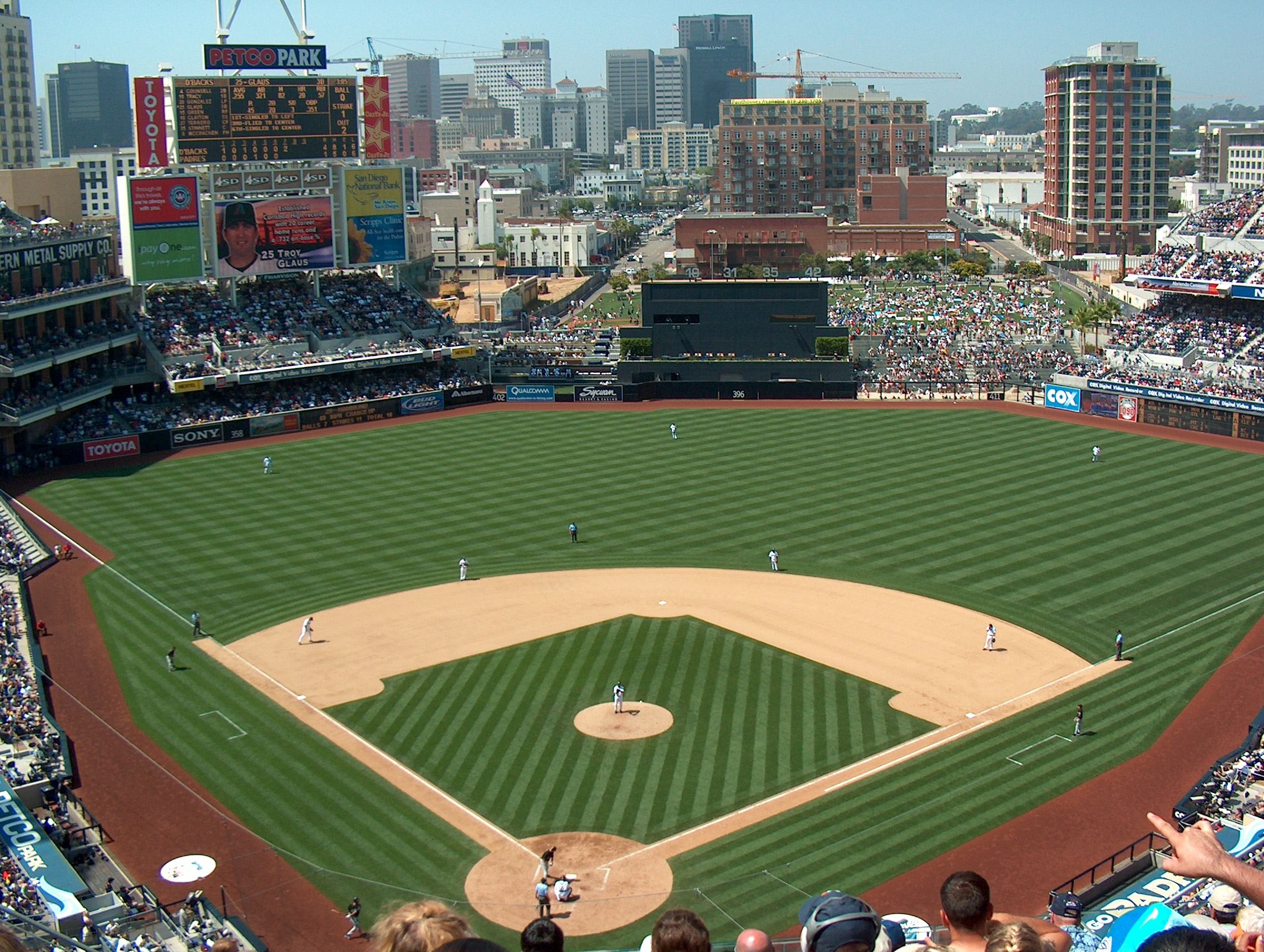
Petco Park

This was the second postseason meeting between the Rays and Astros, a rematch of the 2019 ALDS, which Houston won, 3–2. As part of the terms set for the postseason, all games of the series were played at Petco Park in San Diego, California, a neutral site. This was the first ALCS to take place exclusively at a neutral site. Tampa Bay as the higher seed served as the home team (batting last each inning) for Games 1, 2, 6, and 7, while Houston as the lower seed was the home team for Games 3, 4, and 5, mirroring the 2–3–2 format typically used in the LCS.

Due to the COVID-19 pandemic, the Rays and Astros had not played each other during the regular season. Also due to the pandemic, the ALCS was played without fans in attendance. Both teams stayed at the Park Hyatt Resort Aviara as the designated bubble hotel.

== Summary ==
Tampa Bay won the series, 4–3.

Game	Date	Score	Location	Time	Attendance
1	October 11	Houston Astros – 1, Tampa Bay Rays – 2	Petco Park	3:50	N/A
2	October 12	Houston Astros – 2, Tampa Bay Rays – 4	Petco Park	3:01	N/A
3	October 13	Tampa Bay Rays – 5, Houston Astros – 2	Petco Park	3:59	N/A
4	October 14	Tampa Bay Rays – 3, Houston Astros – 4	Petco Park	3:08	N/A
5	October 15	Tampa Bay Rays – 3, Houston Astros – 4	Petco Park	3:36	N/A
6	October 16	Houston Astros – 7, Tampa Bay Rays – 4	Petco Park	4:01	N/A
7	October 17	Houston Astros – 2, Tampa Bay Rays – 4	Petco Park	3:14	N/A

== Game summaries ==
=== Game 1 ===
October 11, 2020 4:37 pm (PDT) at Petco Park in San Diego, California 73 °F (23 °C), clear
Team	1	2	3	4	5	6	7	8	9	R	H	E
Houston	1	0	0	0	0	0	0	0	0	1	9	1
Tampa Bay	0	0	0	1	1	0	0	0	X	2	6	0
WP: Blake Snell (1–0) LP: Framber Valdez (0–1) Sv: Diego Castillo (1); Home runs: HOU: Jose Altuve (1); TB: Randy Arozarena (1); Attendance: N/A; Boxscore

The Tampa Bay Rays held off the Houston Astros, 2–1, in a nail-biter to take Game 1 of the 2020 American League Championship Series on Sunday night in San Diego. Blake Snell gave up six hits and two walks in five innings, while Valdez allowed just two runs on four hits in six innings. The difference in the game was a well placed two-out RBI single from Mike Zunino in the fifth inning to give the Rays a 2–1 lead. Diego Castillo earned the five-out save to preserve the Rays victory.

=== Game 2 ===
October 12, 2020 1:07 pm (PDT) at Petco Park in San Diego, California 82 °F (28 °C), clear
Team	1	2	3	4	5	6	7	8	9	R	H	E
Houston	0	0	0	0	0	1	0	0	1	2	10	2
Tampa Bay	3	0	0	0	0	0	1	0	X	4	4	0
WP: Charlie Morton (1–0) LP: Lance McCullers Jr. (0–1) Sv: Nick Anderson (1); Home runs: HOU: Carlos Correa (1); TB: Manuel Margot (1), Mike Zunino (1); Attendance: N/A; Boxscore

Former Astro Charlie Morton took the mound for the Rays against Tampa native Lance McCullers Jr. for the Astros. In the bottom of the first, Manuel Margot put the Rays up 3–0 with a 406-foot home run. Margot would also make a spectacular catch in the top of the second. With two runners in scoring position and two outs in the top of the second, George Springer hit a ball to right field that sliced foul, but was caught by Margot, who flipped over the wall to secure the final out in the inning. Carlos Correa would get the Astros on the board in the sixth with a home run off of reliever Pete Fairbanks. Mike Zunino would respond by hitting a solo home run in the seventh off of McCullers. Nick Anderson picked up the a stress-filled save after loading the bases and getting Alex Bergman to fly out to center.

=== Game 3 ===
October 13, 2020 5:40 pm (PDT) at Petco Park in San Diego, California 85 °F (29 °C), clear
Team	1	2	3	4	5	6	7	8	9	R	H	E
Tampa Bay	0	0	0	0	0	5	0	0	0	5	8	0
Houston	1	0	0	0	0	1	0	0	0	2	7	1
WP: Ryan Yarbrough (1–0) LP: José Urquidy (0–1) Sv: Diego Castillo (2); Home runs: TB: None; HOU: Jose Altuve (2), Michael Brantley (1); Attendance: N/A; Boxscore

Joey Wendle gave the Rays a 2–1 advantage with a two-run single in the sixth, and Hunter Renfroe separated the game with a two-run double later in Tampa Bay's five-run inning. In the inning, the Rays also got some help from a throwing error by Jose Altuve and a pair of hit-by-pitches by Enoli Paredes, and they never looked back. With a 5–2 win in Game 3 of the AL Championship Series on Tuesday night at Petco Park, the Rays moved one win away from going to their second World Series.

=== Game 4 ===
October 14, 2020 5:40 pm (PDT) at Petco Park in San Diego, California 83 °F (28 °C), clear
Team	1	2	3	4	5	6	7	8	9	R	H	E
Tampa Bay	0	0	0	2	0	0	0	0	1	3	7	0
Houston	1	0	1	0	2	0	0	0	X	4	9	0
WP: Zack Greinke (1–0) LP: Tyler Glasnow (0–1) Sv: Ryan Pressly (1); Home runs: TB: Randy Arozarena (2); HOU: Jose Altuve (3), George Springer (1); Attendance: N/A; Boxscore

In the bottom of the third inning, Tyler Glasnow walked Martin Maldonado and Michael Brantley before giving up an RBI double to Jose Altuve, making the score 2–0. Tampa Bay answered back in the top of the fourth with a single from Austin Meadows, followed by a home run from Randy Arozarena, his fifth of the postseason. The game went quiet until the bottom of the fifth inning. Maldonado singled and George Springer hit a towering home run, making the score 4–2 Astros. The Rays made some noise in the top half of the sixth inning, knocking three singles, but ultimately none came in to score. In the top of the ninth inning when Rays shortstop Willy Adames doubled in Joey Wendle, closing the gap to one run. Houston was able to hold on and win their first game of the series.

On the night the Astros staved off elimination, George Springer, Jose Altuve, Carlos Correa, Alex Bregman and Yuli Gurriel broke the record for most postseason games played together by any five teammates in baseball history.

=== Game 5 ===
October 15, 2020 2:07 pm (PDT) at Petco Park in San Diego, California 84 °F (29 °C), partly cloudy
Team	1	2	3	4	5	6	7	8	9	R	H	E
Tampa Bay	0	0	1	0	1	0	0	1	0	3	7	1
Houston	1	0	2	0	0	0	0	0	1	4	6	0
WP: Ryan Pressly (1–0) LP: Nick Anderson (0–1); Home runs: TB: Brandon Lowe (1), Randy Arozarena (3), Ji-man Choi (1); HOU: George Springer (2), Carlos Correa (2); Attendance: N/A; Boxscore

Eleven pitchers were used (seven by Tampa Bay) in a "bullpen game".

George Springer hit a home run to start the bottom of the 1st inning for the Astros. Brandon Lowe tied the game in the 3rd, but the Astros reclaimed the lead in the bottom frame when Michael Brantley hit a single to right field to score two runs. Randy Arozarena hit a home run off Enoli Paredes in the fifth inning for his sixth home run of the postseason to make it 3-2. Ji-Man Choi tied the game in the eighth inning when he hit a home run off Josh James to tie the game at 3

Astros shortstop Carlos Correa hit a walk-off home run in the ninth inning off reliever Nick Anderson. The Astros became just the fourth team in MLB history to force a Game 6 after trailing a best-of-seven series 3–0 (after the 1998 Braves, 1999 Mets and 2004 Red Sox).

=== Game 6 ===
October 16, 2020 3:07 pm (PDT) at Petco Park in San Diego, California 79 °F (26 °C), partly cloudy
Team	1	2	3	4	5	6	7	8	9	R	H	E
Houston	0	0	0	0	4	1	2	0	0	7	11	0
Tampa Bay	0	1	0	0	0	0	1	2	0	4	6	0
WP: Framber Valdez (1–1) LP: Blake Snell (1–1) Sv: Ryan Pressly (2); Home runs: HOU: Kyle Tucker (1); TB: Manuel Margot 2 (3); Attendance: N/A; Boxscore

Framber Valdez was matched against Blake Snell. The Astros became just the second team to force a Game 7 in MLB postseason history after trailing a best-of-seven series 3–0 (after the 2004 Red Sox).

Game 6's pivotal frame proved to be the fifth. Rays ace Blake Snell entered hoping to preserve a 1–0 lead, but he was lifted after allowing a walk and a single to begin the inning. Snell was visibly unhappy with manager Kevin Cash's decision to remove him from the game in favor of reliever Diego Castillo. He ostensibly grew less happy as Castillo then gave up the lead. By the time the Astros half of the fifth inning was over, the Astros were up by a 4–1 margin thanks to a timely bunt by Martin Maldonado and big hits from George Springer, Jose Altuve, and Carlos Correa. The Astros would add one run in the sixth and two in the seventh and go on to win the game, 7–4.

=== Game 7 ===
This was the first League Championship Series to reach a Game 7 since the 2017 ALCS, won by Houston over the New York Yankees.

October 17, 2020 5:37 pm (PDT) at Petco Park in San Diego, California 74 °F (23 °C), clear
Team	1	2	3	4	5	6	7	8	9	R	H	E
Houston	0	0	0	0	0	0	0	2	0	2	7	0
Tampa Bay	2	1	0	0	0	1	0	0	X	4	6	0
WP: Charlie Morton (2–0) LP: Lance McCullers Jr. (0–2) Sv: Pete Fairbanks (1); Home runs: HOU: None; TB: Randy Arozarena (4), Mike Zunino (2); Attendance: N/A; Boxscore

The starting pitchers, Lance McCullers Jr. for Houston and Charlie Morton for Tampa Bay, had both pitched for Houston in Game 7 of the 2017 ALCS and Game 7 of the 2017 World Series. Tampa Bay became the first MLB team to win a Game 7 after taking a 3–0 series lead. Concluding matters was Pete Fairbanks, who got Aledmys Díaz to fly out to Manuel Margot, to end the Astros' season and win the second AL pennant for Tampa Bay, the first in 12 seasons. Fairbanks earned his second save this postseason. The Rays became just the second team to win both a division series winner-take-all Game 5 and a League Championship Series winner-take-all Game 7 in the same year (after the 2012 San Francisco Giants).

Postgame, Randy Arozarena was awarded the ALCS MVP. His seven home runs were the most ever by a rookie in a single postseason, breaking a tie with former Ray Evan Longoria (2008). Only three players ever have hit more homers in a single postseason: Barry Bonds (2002 Giants), Carlos Beltran (2004 Astros), and Nelson Cruz (2011 Rangers).

=== Composite line score ===
2020 ALCS (4–3): Tampa Bay Rays beat Houston Astros

Team	1	2	3	4	5	6	7	8	9	R	H	E
Houston Astros	4	0	3	0	6	3	2	2	2	22	59	4
Tampa Bay Rays	5	2	1	3	2	6	2	3	1	25	44	1
Home runs: HOU: Jose Altuve (3), George Springer (2), Carlos Correa (2), Michael Brantley (1), Kyle Tucker (1); TB: Randy Arozarena (4), Manuel Margot (3), Mike Zunino (2), Brandon Lowe (1), Ji-Man Choi (1)

== See also ==
- 2020 National League Championship Series
