= 2020 American League Division Series =

2020 baseball series in the United States

Teams
| Team (Wins) | | Manager | Season |
| Tampa Bay Rays (3) | | Kevin Cash | 40–20 (.667), GA: 7 |
| New York Yankees (2) | | Aaron Boone | 33–27 (.550), GB: 7 |
- Dates: October 5–9
- Television: TBS
- TV announcers: Brian Anderson, Ron Darling and Lauren Shehadi
- Radio announcers: Dan Shulman and Chris Singleton
- Umpires: C. B. Bucknor, Mark Carlson (crew chief), Mike Estabrook, Marvin Hudson, David Rackley, Todd Tichenor

Teams
| Team (Wins) | | Manager | Season |
| Houston Astros (3) | | Dusty Baker | 29–31 (.483), GB: 7 |
| Oakland Athletics (1) | | Bob Melvin | 36–24 (.600), GA: 7 |
- Dates: October 5–8
- Television: TBS
- TV announcers: Don Orsillo, Jeff Francoeur and Matt Winer
- Radio: ESPN
- Radio announcers: Dave O'Brien, Jim Bowden (Games 1, 3–4) and Kyle Peterson (Game 2)
- Umpires: Laz Díaz, Tripp Gibson, Ed Hickox, Adrian Johnson, Ron Kulpa, Jerry Meals (crew chief)
- ALWC: Tampa Bay Rays over Toronto Blue Jays (2–0); Oakland Athletics over Chicago White Sox (2–1); New York Yankees over Cleveland Indians (2–0); Houston Astros over Minnesota Twins (2–0)

The 2020 American League Division Series were two best-of-five playoff series in Major League Baseball’s (MLB) expanded 2020 postseason to determine participating teams in the 2020 American League Championship Series. Those matchups were:

- (1) Tampa Bay Rays (AL East champions) vs. (5) New York Yankees (AL East 2nd place): Rays won the series, 3–2.
- (2) Oakland Athletics (AL West champions) vs. (6) Houston Astros (AL West 2nd place): Astros won the series, 3–1.

Due to the COVID-19 pandemic, all games for each of the two series were held at two neutral sites at Petco Park in San Diego, California, and Dodger Stadium in Los Angeles, California. The games were televised nationally by TBS. The Rays would earn their second American League Championship Series berth, their first being in 2008, while the Astros won their fourth straight American League Division Series.

The Rays would go on to defeat the Astros in the ALCS, then lose the 2020 World Series to the National League champion Los Angeles Dodgers.

== Background ==
Due to the COVID-19 pandemic, the MLB season was reduced to 60 games. As part of a special postseason format, playoff berths were made available for eight teams in each league: three division winners, three division runners-up, and two wild card teams. With no first round byes for division winners, all teams were required to play in a Wild Card series.

Between the two leagues, Central division teams claimed three of the four wild card berths and thus made up seven of the sixteen teams in the Wild Card. However, all seven Central division teams lost their Wild Card series, thus leaving the Division series in both leagues to be contested exclusively by teams from East and West divisions.

The Rays entered the ALDS as the top seed, having completed the regular season at 40–20 (.667) and winning the AL East. The second-seeded Athletics won the AL West, going 36–24 (.600). The two second place teams in their respective divisions, the Yankees and the Astros, also made the ALDS. Since 2012, when MLB removed the stipulation that two teams could not play each other in the ALDS if they were of the same division, there have been three times when an ALDS had at least one series with two division opponents. This is not only the fourth time that this will occur, but it is also the first time since the strike-affected 1981 American League Division Series (where division opponents were assured of facing each other on a one-time basis) that both ALDS match-ups consist of division opponents facing each other.

This was the sixth ALDS for the Rays (having made it previously last year) and 22nd for the Yankees (and fourth in a row); they had faced each other ten times in the regular season, with the Rays winning eight out of ten games. This was the ninth ALDS for the Athletics (first since 2013) and the fifth for the Astros (their 12th Division Series overall, making their fourth in a row); in ten games between the two teams, the Athletics won seven games.

As part of the terms set for the postseason, all games starting with the Division Series would be played at neutral sites. The Rays and Yankees played at Petco Park, while the Astros and Athletics played at Dodger Stadium.

The higher seed served as the "home team" (i.e., batted second each inning) for Games 1, 2, and 5, while the lower seed was the "home team" for Games 3 and 4, mirroring the 2–2–1 format typically used in the Division Series.

== Matchups ==
=== Tampa Bay Rays vs. New York Yankees ===
This is the first postseason meeting between the Yankees and the Rays.

Tampa Bay won the series, 3–2.

| Game | Date | Score | Location | Time | Attendance |
|---|---|---|---|---|---|
| 1 | October 5 | New York Yankees – 9, Tampa Bay Rays – 3 | Petco Park | 3:38 | N/A |
| 2 | October 6 | New York Yankees – 5, Tampa Bay Rays – 7 | Petco Park | 3:43 | N/A |
| 3 | October 7 | Tampa Bay Rays – 8, New York Yankees – 4 | Petco Park | 3:32 | N/A |
| 4 | October 8 | Tampa Bay Rays – 1, New York Yankees – 5 | Petco Park | 3:14 | N/A |
| 5 | October 9 | New York Yankees – 1, Tampa Bay Rays – 2 | Petco Park | 3:21 | N/A |

=== Oakland Athletics vs. Houston Astros ===
This is the first postseason meeting between the Athletics and Astros.

Houston won the series, 3–1.

| Game | Date | Score | Location | Time | Attendance |
|---|---|---|---|---|---|
| 1 | October 5 | Houston Astros – 10, Oakland Athletics – 5 | Dodger Stadium | 3:30 | N/A |
| 2 | October 6 | Houston Astros – 5, Oakland Athletics – 2 | Dodger Stadium | 2:54 | N/A |
| 3 | October 7 | Oakland Athletics – 9, Houston Astros – 7 | Dodger Stadium | 3:36 | N/A |
| 4 | October 8 | Oakland Athletics – 6, Houston Astros – 11 | Dodger Stadium | 3:43 | N/A |

== Tampa Bay vs. New York ==
This is the first postseason match-up between the Rays and Yankees. The Rays won eight of ten games against the Yankees during the 60-game regular season.

=== Game 1 ===
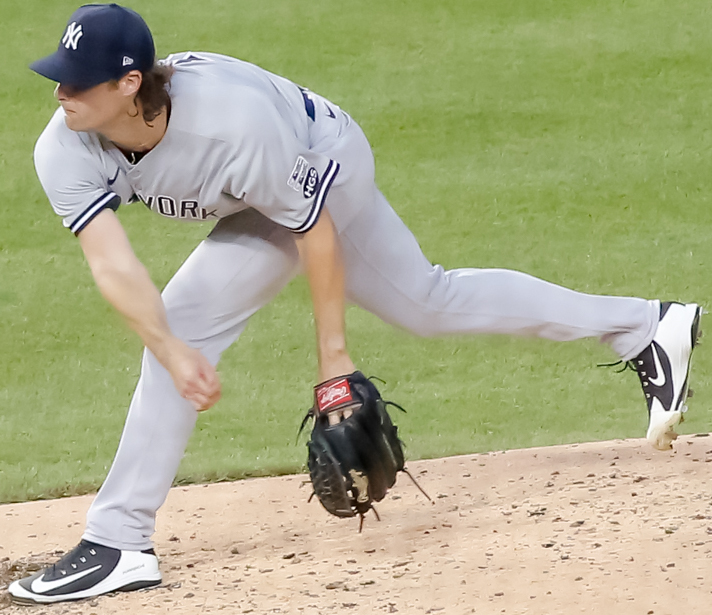
Gerrit Cole struck out eight batters over six innings and was credited with the win in Game 1

October 5, 2020 5:07 pm (PDT) at Petco Park in San Diego, California
| Team | 1 | 2 | 3 | 4 | 5 | 6 | 7 | 8 | 9 | R | H | E |
|---|---|---|---|---|---|---|---|---|---|---|---|---|
| New York | 1 | 0 | 1 | 0 | 2 | 0 | 0 | 0 | 5 | 9 | 15 | 0 |
| Tampa Bay | 1 | 0 | 0 | 2 | 0 | 0 | 0 | 0 | 0 | 3 | 6 | 0 |
WP: Gerrit Cole (1–0) LP: Blake Snell (0–1); Home runs: NYY: Clint Frazier (1), Kyle Higashioka (1), Aaron Judge (1), Giancarlo Stanton (1); TB: Randy Arozarena (1), Ji-Man Choi (1); Attendance: N/A; Boxscore

DJ LeMahieu began the game with a single off Rays starter Blake Snell, and came around to score following a wild pitch, a groundout, and a sacrifice fly. In the bottom of the first, Randy Arozarena tied the game with a solo home run off Yankees starter Gerrit Cole. Clint Frazier broke the tie with a home run in the top of the third, but the Rays promptly took a 3–2 lead with a two-run Ji-Man Choi home run. The Yankees regained the lead with solo home runs by Kyle Higashioka and Aaron Judge in the top of the fifth, which proved to be Snell's last inning. Ryan Thompson and Oliver Drake pitched scoreless sixth, seventh, and eighth innings, as did Cole, Chad Green, and Zack Britton. John Curtiss struggled in the ninth inning for the Rays, giving up an RBI single to Hicks before loading the bases for Giancarlo Stanton, who hit a grand slam to extend the Yankees' lead to 9–3. Shane McClanahan entered to pitch for the Rays afterwards, becoming the first pitcher in MLB history to debut in the postseason. Luis Cessa pitched a scoreless bottom of the ninth to end the game.

=== Game 2 ===
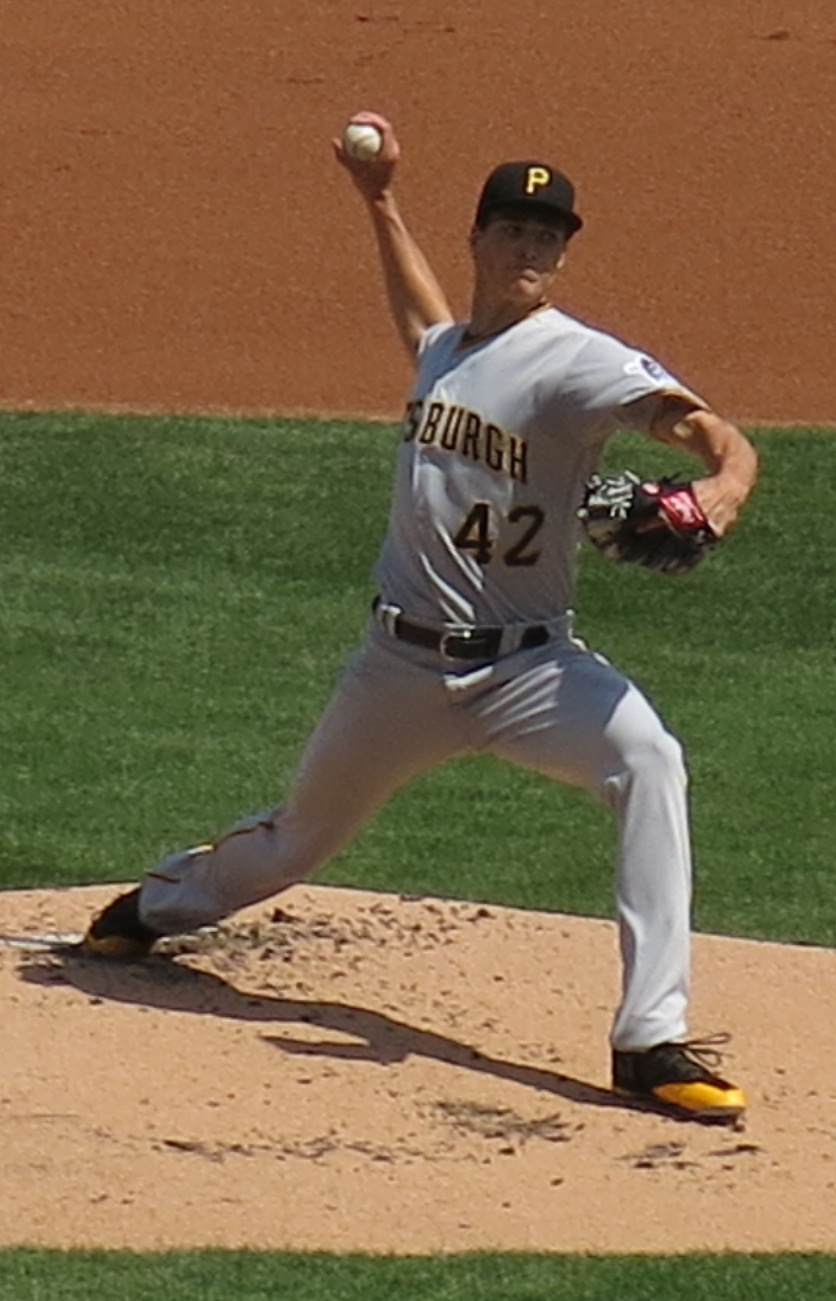
Winning pitcher Tyler Glasnow struck out ten batters over five innings in Game 2

October 6, 2020 5:10 pm (PDT) at Petco Park in San Diego, California
| Team | 1 | 2 | 3 | 4 | 5 | 6 | 7 | 8 | 9 | R | H | E |
|---|---|---|---|---|---|---|---|---|---|---|---|---|
| New York | 0 | 1 | 0 | 3 | 0 | 0 | 0 | 0 | 1 | 5 | 5 | 1 |
| Tampa Bay | 1 | 2 | 2 | 0 | 1 | 1 | 0 | 0 | X | 7 | 8 | 0 |
WP: Tyler Glasnow (1–0) LP: J. A. Happ (0–1) Sv: Pete Fairbanks (1); Home runs: NYY: Giancarlo Stanton 2 (3); TB: Randy Arozarena (2), Mike Zunino (1), Manuel Margot (1), Austin Meadows (1); Attendance: N/A; Boxscore

The Rays took an early lead on a solo Randy Arozarena home run off starter Deivi García in the bottom of the first, but Giancarlo Stanton tied the game with a solo home run off Rays starter Tyler Glasnow to lead off the top of the second. J. A. Happ replaced García after the first inning; in the bottom of the second, Joey Wendle singled and Mike Zunino homered to give the Rays a 3–1 lead. Manuel Margot hit another two-run homer off Happ in the third following a walk to Ji-Man Choi. Glasnow began the fourth by allowing a single to Aaron Hicks and walking Luke Voit, which was followed by another Stanton home run, cutting the score to 5–4. Happ was replaced by Adam Ottavino in the fourth; in the fifth, Ottavino walked Wendle, who promptly stole second. Jonathan Loáisiga then entered to pitch to Kevin Kiermaier, who scored Wendle with a single. Austin Meadows extended the lead to 7–4 with a home run off Loáisiga in the sixth. Scoreless innings were pitched by the Rays' Diego Castillo and Nick Anderson and the Yankees' Jonathan Holder and Nick Nelson. Pete Fairbanks entered to finish the game for the Rays in the ninth, and ran into trouble after issuing walks to Urshela and Gleyber Torres. He was able to strike out Clint Frazier and Gary Sánchez, but DJ LeMahieu singled to drive in a run. Fairbanks was able to retire Aaron Judge with a groundout to limit the damage and seal the victory for Tampa Bay.

The Rays' pitchers struck out 18 Yankees batters, a record for a nine-inning postseason game. Giancarlo Stanton joined Lou Gehrig and Reggie Jackson as the only Yankees with home runs in four straight postseason games.

=== Game 3 ===
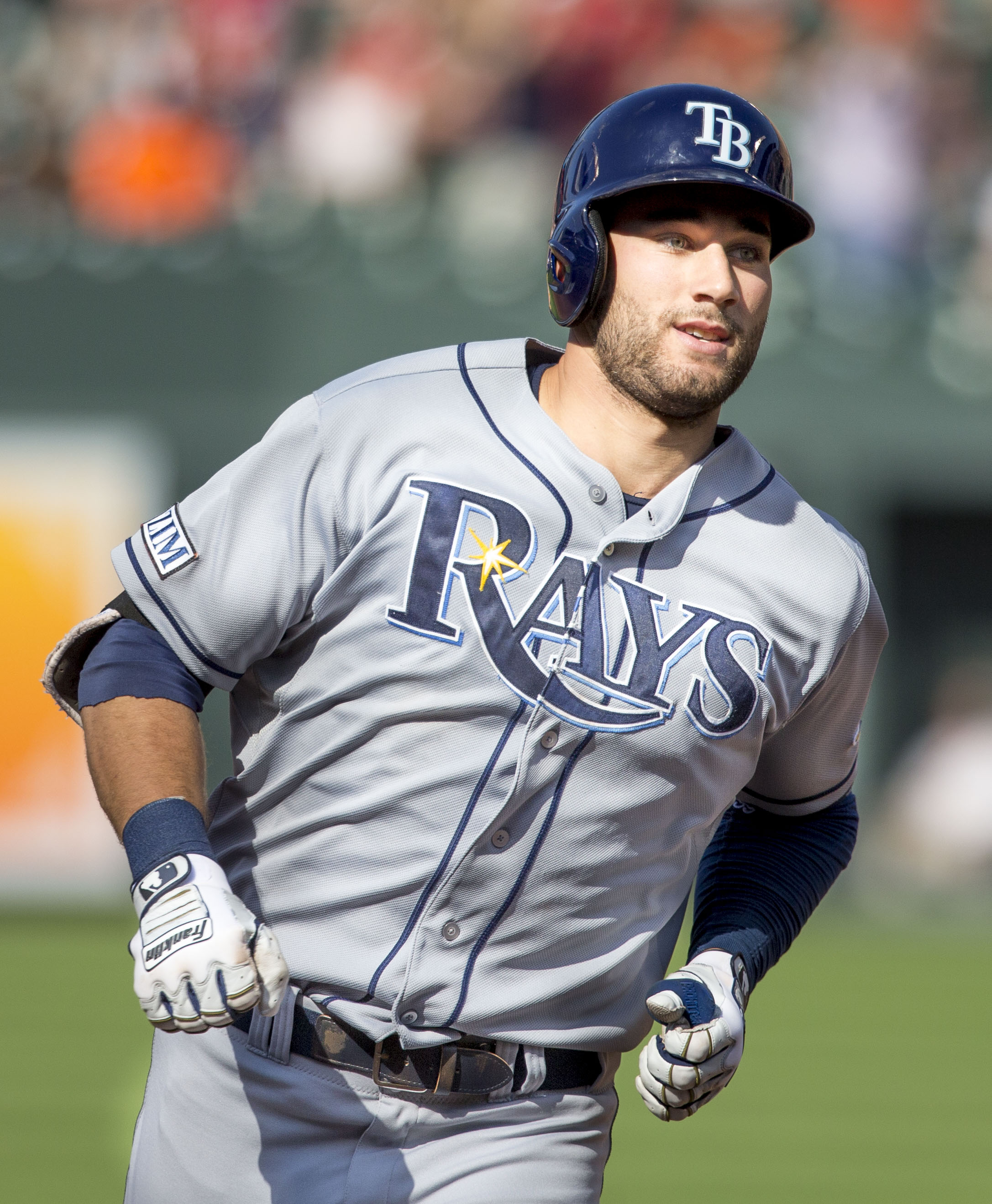
Kevin Kiermaier hit a go-ahead 3-run home run in the top of the fourth in Game 3

October 7, 2020 4:10 pm (PDT) at Petco Park in San Diego, California
| Team | 1 | 2 | 3 | 4 | 5 | 6 | 7 | 8 | 9 | R | H | E |
|---|---|---|---|---|---|---|---|---|---|---|---|---|
| Tampa Bay | 0 | 1 | 0 | 3 | 1 | 3 | 0 | 0 | 0 | 8 | 13 | 2 |
| New York | 0 | 0 | 1 | 0 | 1 | 0 | 0 | 2 | 0 | 4 | 7 | 0 |
WP: Charlie Morton (1–0) LP: Masahiro Tanaka (0–1); Home runs: TB: Kevin Kiermaier (1), Randy Arozarena (3), Michael Pérez (1); NYY: Giancarlo Stanton (4); Attendance: N/A; Boxscore

Michael Pérez began the scoring with an RBI single in the top of the second off Yankees starter Masahiro Tanaka. The Rays started Charlie Morton, who pitched two 1-2-3 innings to begin the game, but, in the third, Brett Gardner singled, Kyle Higashioka reached on a Willy Adames error, and DJ LeMahieu walked to load the bases. Aaron Judge scored Gardner on a sacrifice fly, but Morton got Luke Voit to ground out to end the inning. In the fourth, Kevin Kiermaier homered after Joey Wendle singled and Adames walked to give the Rays a 4–1 lead, and Randy Arozarena added a run with a solo home run in the fifth, which ended Tanaka's outing. Morton allowed a run in the bottom of the fifth after LeMahieu singled and Aaron Hicks scored him with a double, but Pérez hit a two-run home run off Chad Green in the sixth to extend the Rays' lead again. Luis Cessa replaced Green after the home run, and walked Arozarena, who scored on a Ji-man Choi double, giving the Rays an 8–2 lead. Giancarlo Stanton hit a two-run home run off Shane McClanahan in the eighth after Voit reached on an error, but Diego Castillo pitched a scoreless ninth to end the game at 8–4 for Tampa Bay.

=== Game 4 ===
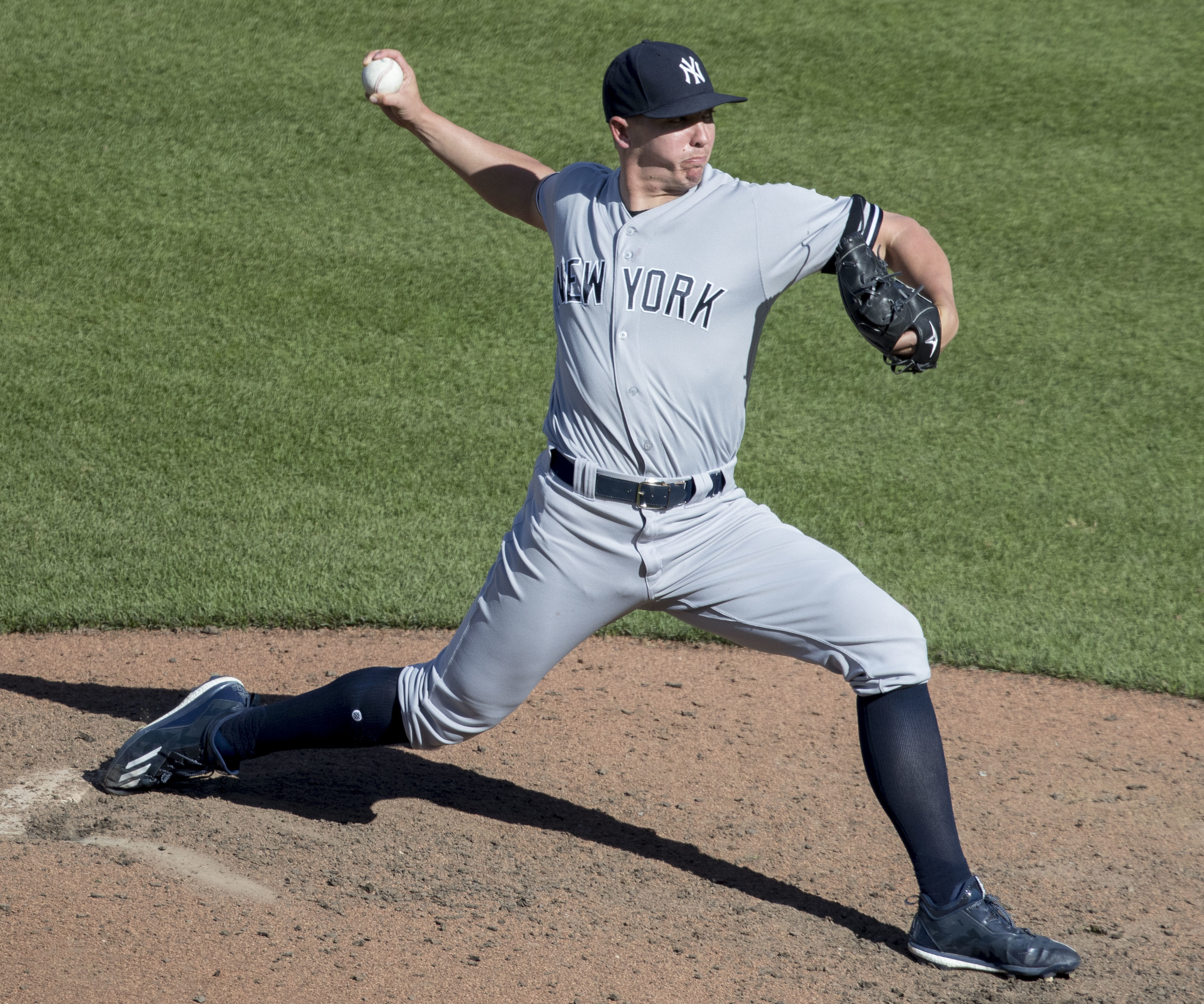
Chad Green pitched two perfect innings and earned the win in Game 4

October 8, 2020 4:10 pm (PDT) at Petco Park in San Diego, California
| Team | 1 | 2 | 3 | 4 | 5 | 6 | 7 | 8 | 9 | R | H | E |
|---|---|---|---|---|---|---|---|---|---|---|---|---|
| Tampa Bay | 0 | 0 | 1 | 0 | 0 | 0 | 0 | 0 | 0 | 1 | 3 | 1 |
| New York | 0 | 2 | 0 | 0 | 0 | 2 | 0 | 1 | X | 5 | 11 | 0 |
WP: Chad Green (1–0) LP: Ryan Thompson (0–1) Sv: Aroldis Chapman (1); Home runs: TB: None; NYY: Luke Voit (1), Gleyber Torres (1); Attendance: N/A; Boxscore

In Game 4, the Rays started Ryan Thompson as an opener. The Yankees started Jordan Montgomery. In the second, Thompson gave up a leadoff home run to Luke Voit and promptly loaded the bases with three straight walks to Brett Gardner, Gleyber Torres and Gio Urshela. Thompson was able to strike out Kyle Higashioka, but Aaron Judge delivered a sacrifice fly to give the Yankees a 2–0 lead. Yankees starter Jordan Montgomery allowed the Rays' sole run of the game in the third when Willy Adames walked, Kevin Kiermaier hit a ground-rule double, and Brandon Lowe grounded out to score Adames. Ryan Yarbrough pitched for the Rays after Thompson, and allowed one run, a solo home run to Torres. The Yankees scored another run in the eighth inning off Aaron Slegers after Torres singled and stole second and was driven in by a Higashioka single. Chad Green, Zack Britton, and Aroldis Chapman all pitched scoreless innings in relief of Montgomery to force a Game 5.

=== Game 5 ===
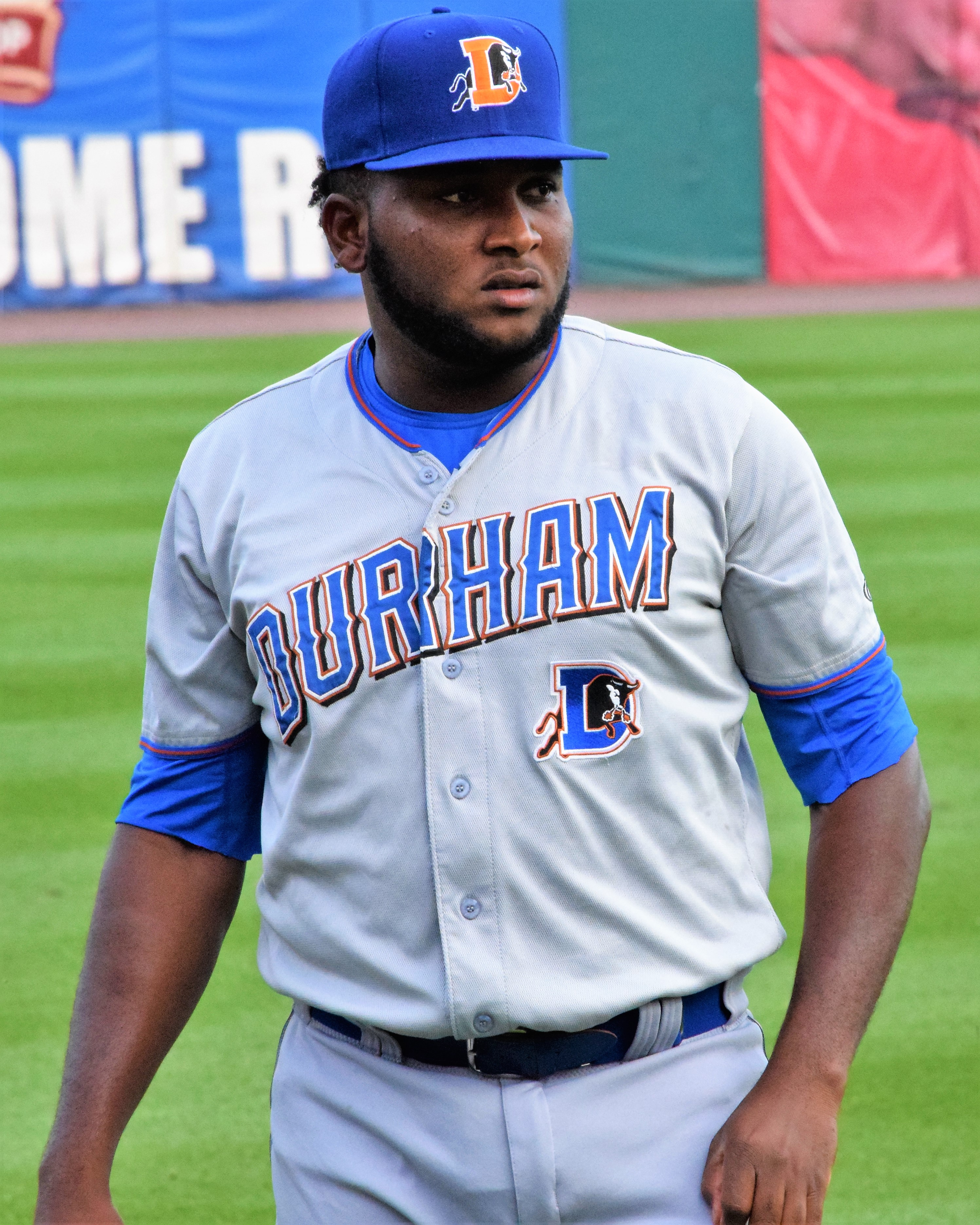
Diego Castillo (pictured here with the Durham Bulls) threw two scoreless innings to close Game 5.

October 9, 2020 4:10 pm (PDT) at Petco Park in San Diego, California
| Team | 1 | 2 | 3 | 4 | 5 | 6 | 7 | 8 | 9 | R | H | E |
|---|---|---|---|---|---|---|---|---|---|---|---|---|
| New York | 0 | 0 | 0 | 1 | 0 | 0 | 0 | 0 | 0 | 1 | 3 | 2 |
| Tampa Bay | 0 | 0 | 0 | 0 | 1 | 0 | 0 | 1 | X | 2 | 3 | 0 |
WP: Diego Castillo (1–0) LP: Aroldis Chapman (0–1); Home runs: NYY: Aaron Judge (2); TB: Austin Meadows (2), Mike Brosseau (1); Attendance: N/A; Boxscore

In the decisive Game 5, the Yankees turned to Gerrit Cole, while the Rays started Tyler Glasnow. As Glasnow had thrown 93 pitches in the Rays' victory in Game 2, he was not expected to pitch for long. Glasnow pitched into the third, when Nick Anderson entered in relief. Aaron Judge homered off Anderson to lead off the fourth, giving the Yankees a 1–0. Cole, meanwhile, took a no-hitter into the fifth inning until Austin Meadows tied the game with a home run of his own. Pete Fairbanks pitched a scoreless fifth and sixth for Tampa Bay, while Zack Britton relieved Cole in the sixth and earned two outs in the seventh before the Yankees went to their closer, Aroldis Chapman, to keep the game tied. After Diego Castillo retired the Yankees in the top of the eighth, Mike Brosseau gave the Rays the lead with a home run off Chapman, an emotional matchup that was seen as significant as Chapman had been previously suspended for throwing at Brosseau's head in September. Castillo pitched a scoreless top of the ninth to send the Rays to their first ALCS since 2008.

=== Composite line score ===
2020 ALDS (3–2): Tampa Bay Rays beat New York Yankees

| Team | 1 | 2 | 3 | 4 | 5 | 6 | 7 | 8 | 9 | R | H | E |
|---|---|---|---|---|---|---|---|---|---|---|---|---|
| New York Yankees | 1 | 3 | 2 | 4 | 3 | 2 | 0 | 3 | 6 | 24 | 41 | 3 |
| Tampa Bay Rays | 2 | 3 | 3 | 5 | 3 | 4 | 0 | 1 | 0 | 21 | 33 | 3 |
Total attendance: N/A Average attendance: N/A

== Oakland vs. Houston ==
This is the first postseason match-up between the Athletics and Astros. The Athletics won seven of ten games against the Astros during the 60-game regular season as members of the AL West.

=== Game 1 ===
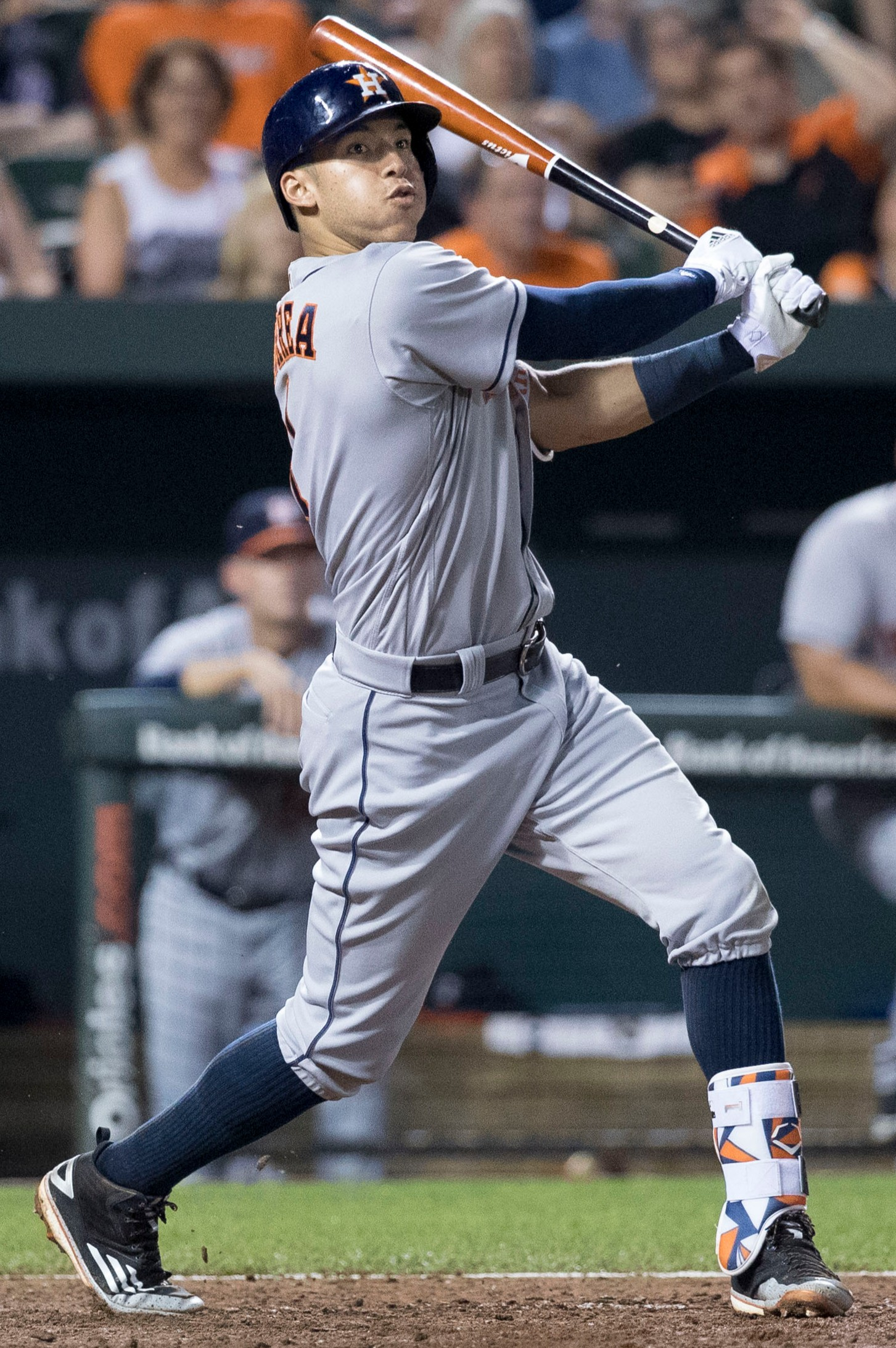
Carlos Correa hit two home runs in Game 1.

October 5, 2020 1:07 pm (PDT) at Dodger Stadium in Los Angeles, California
| Team | 1 | 2 | 3 | 4 | 5 | 6 | 7 | 8 | 9 | R | H | E |
|---|---|---|---|---|---|---|---|---|---|---|---|---|
| Houston | 0 | 0 | 0 | 3 | 0 | 4 | 1 | 0 | 2 | 10 | 16 | 1 |
| Oakland | 0 | 2 | 1 | 1 | 1 | 0 | 0 | 0 | 0 | 5 | 8 | 1 |
WP: Blake Taylor (1–0) LP: J.B. Wendelken (0–1); Home runs: HOU: Alex Bregman (1), Carlos Correa 2 (2); OAK: Khris Davis (1), Sean Murphy (1), Matt Olson (1); Attendance: N/A; Boxscore

In Game 1, Oakland struck first on a home run by Khris Davis. They would follow with another home run to lead off the third inning from Sean Murphy to give them a 3–0 lead. They had a chance for more with consecutive singles before a double play wiped their chance out. In the next inning, the Astros struck back with home runs from Alex Bregman and Carlos Correa to tie the game at three. Oakland responded in kind with the first batter in Matt Olson to take the lead back. In the fifth, both starting pitchers would be taken out before getting an out, with Chris Bassitt having allowed three runs on nine hits while Lance McCullers Jr allowed five runs (four earned) on eight hits. The Athletics led 5–3 after five innings, but the Astros took over from there in through an awakened offense to override a previously vaunted bullpen. In the sixth inning, the Astros generated four runs after having led the inning off with two outs, doing so on an error, three singles, and a double. The Astros bullpen came through for them with the work of four pitchers that allowed no hits/runs, with Blake Taylor receiving the win for his pivotal fifth inning. As for the Athletics, they went through seven pitchers to pitch in relief, who combined for seven hits and seven runs while J.B. Wendelken received the loss for his work in the fifth. The game was full of distinct firsts, such as George Springer having his first four hit postseason game, while Correa became the first shortstop (and first Astro) to have multiple career multi-homer postseason games.

=== Game 2 ===
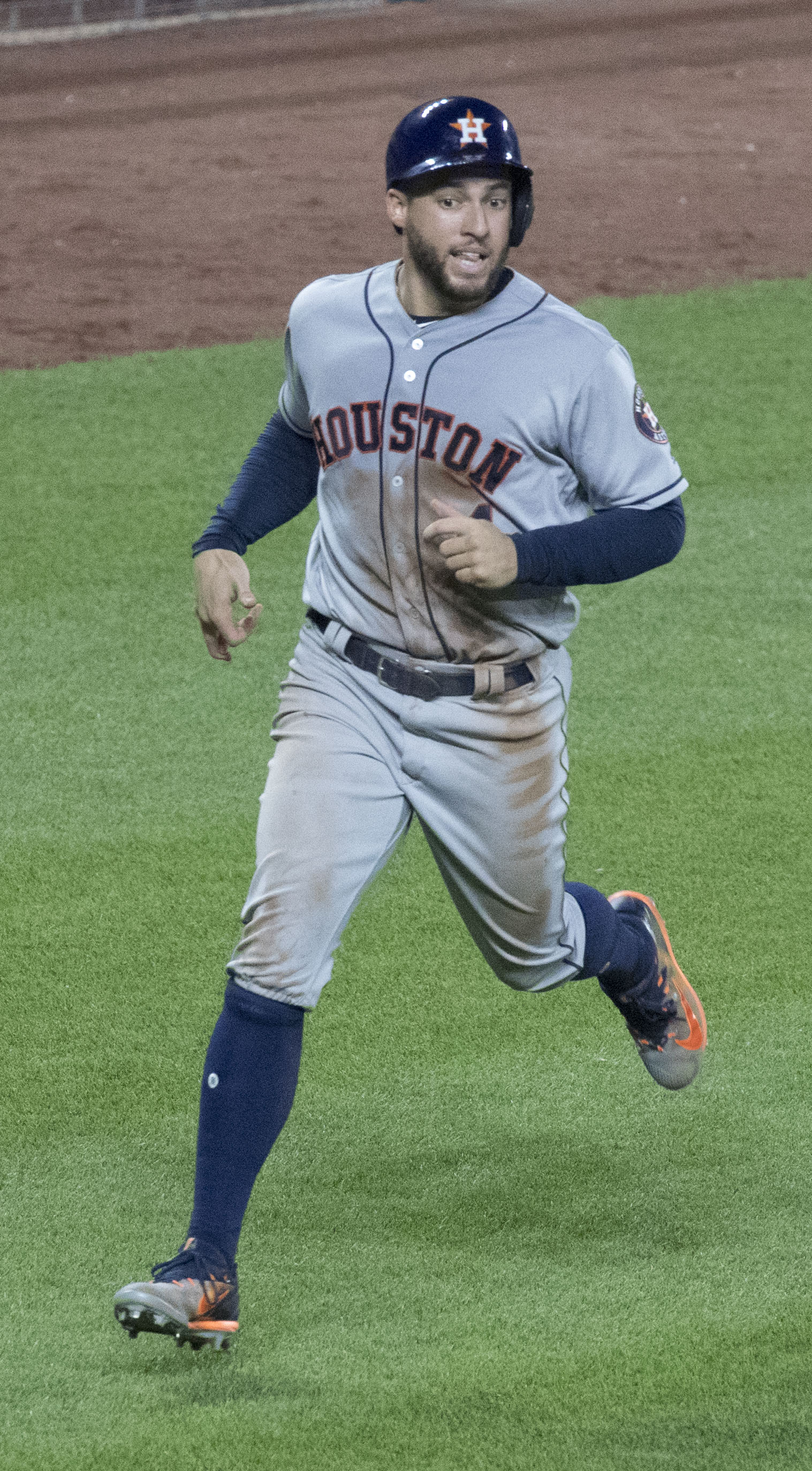
George Springer hit two home runs in Game 2.

October 6, 2020 1:37 pm (PDT) at Dodger Stadium in Los Angeles, California
| Team | 1 | 2 | 3 | 4 | 5 | 6 | 7 | 8 | 9 | R | H | E |
|---|---|---|---|---|---|---|---|---|---|---|---|---|
| Houston | 0 | 0 | 2 | 1 | 2 | 0 | 0 | 0 | 0 | 5 | 6 | 0 |
| Oakland | 0 | 1 | 0 | 1 | 0 | 0 | 0 | 0 | 0 | 2 | 6 | 0 |
WP: Framber Valdez (1–0) LP: Sean Manaea (0–1) Sv: Ryan Pressly (1); Home runs: HOU: George Springer 2 (2), Martin Maldonado (1); OAK: Khris Davis (2), Chad Pinder (1); Attendance: N/A; Boxscore

Once again, the Athletics took the lead early, doing so on a home run from Khris Davis off Framber Valdez. However, the Astros would respond in the next inning with a two-out home run by George Springer to make it 2–1. In the next inning, the Astros generated a run on a double, a single, and a groundout from Carlos Correa to make it 3–1. The Athletics responded with their first batter in the fourth by Chad Pinder's home run shot to make it 3–2. Sean Manaea would be pulled after two batters in the fifth inning after Martin Maldonado hit a home run. On Yusmeiro Petit's first pitch as reliever, George Springer hit a deep shot to left field to make it 5–2. Valdez would pitch until the seventh inning, finishing with ten retired batters in a row (with reliever Enoli Paredes retiring the first three batters as well). Ryan Pressly allowed a single in the ninth inning, but he followed it up with a flyball and a double play to finish another game of work for the Astros, who won their fourth straight postseason game.

=== Game 3 ===
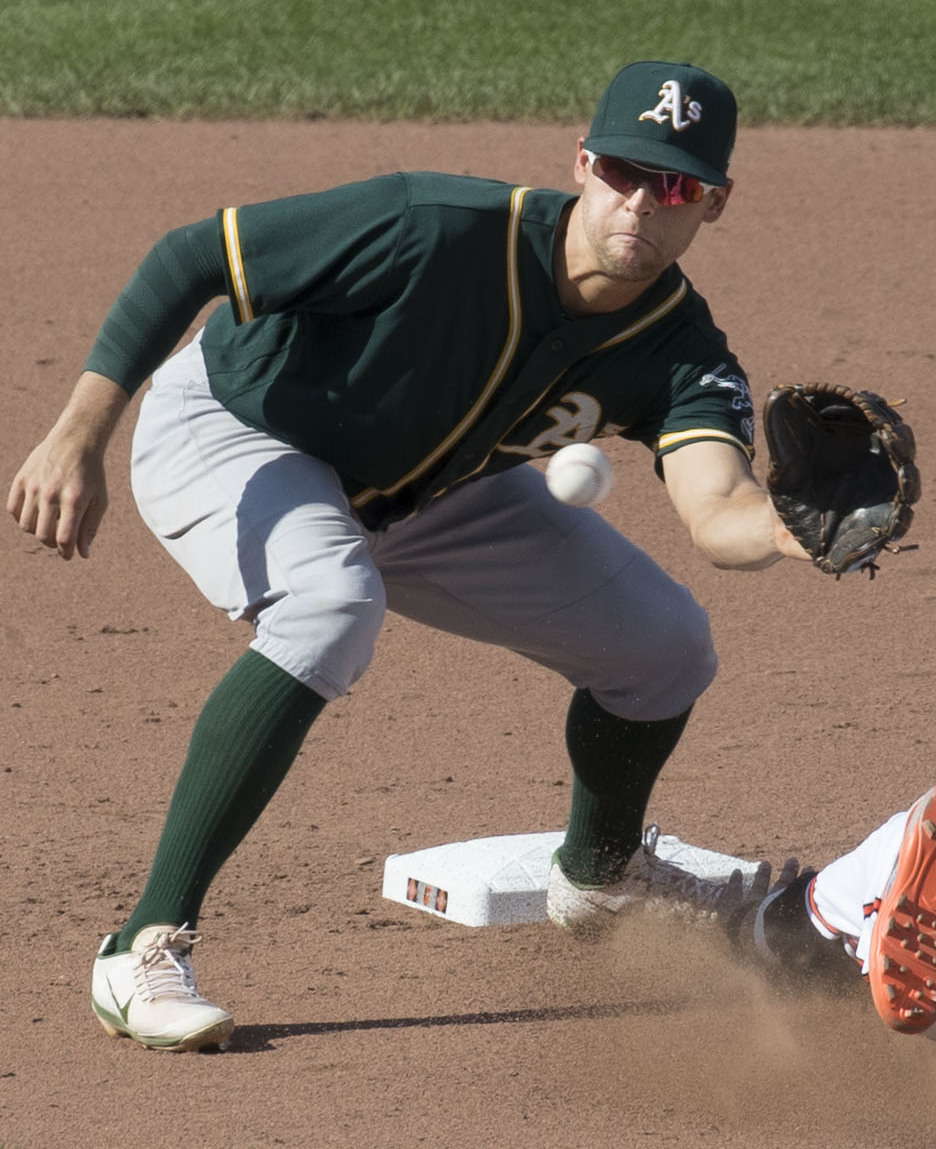
Chad Pinder hit a game-tying three run homer run, one of five by the A's, in Game 3.

October 7, 2020 12:35 pm (PDT) at Dodger Stadium in Los Angeles, California
| Team | 1 | 2 | 3 | 4 | 5 | 6 | 7 | 8 | 9 | R | H | E |
|---|---|---|---|---|---|---|---|---|---|---|---|---|
| Oakland | 1 | 1 | 0 | 1 | 1 | 0 | 3 | 2 | 0 | 9 | 11 | 1 |
| Houston | 2 | 0 | 0 | 0 | 5 | 0 | 0 | 0 | 0 | 7 | 10 | 0 |
WP: Liam Hendriks (1–0) LP: Brooks Raley (0–1); Home runs: OAK: Tommy La Stella (1), Mark Canha (1), Matt Olson (2), Marcus Semien (1), Chad Pinder (2); HOU: Jose Altuve (1), Aledmys Díaz (1); Attendance: N/A; Boxscore

The third game was more of the same in pitching and leads in a relative sense, since both starting pitchers in Jesus Luzardo and José Urquidy did not make it to the fifth inning, and the Athletics and the Astros would trade the lead separate times. Tommy La Stella started it off early for the Athletics, doing so on the seventh pitch of the game to give them a 1–0 lead. The Astros responded in kind with a home run by Jose Altuve (his first since the famed shot in the ALCS the previous year), while Carlos Correa drove in a run with a fielder's choice that scored Michael Brantley to make it 2–1. Mark Canha absolved them of the lead four pitches later on a home run. Matt Olson gave them the lead on the first pitch of the fourth inning, and a home run from Marcus Semien in the subsequent inning chased Urquidy from the game as the Athletics led 4–2. The bottom half of the frame saw three pitchers for the Athletics, as a home run from Aledmys Diaz after a lead-off walk tied the game, while Michael Brantley and Alex Bregman each scored in a run on base hits off Yusmeiro Petit before Jake Diekman finished the inning with allowing an RBI single and the final out of a now 7–4 game. In the seventh inning, the Athletics would tie the game, garnering two straight singles off Josh James before a Chad Pinder home run tied it at seven. Brooks Raley would get the three outs to close the inning (as James had done for the sixth), but his attempt at pitching a second inning of work resulted in two walks, a double, and two runs on sacrifice flyballs to make it 9–7. Liam Hendriks closed out the last three innings for the Athletics by allowing just one hit and no runs as they would force a Game 4 in the series.

=== Game 4 ===
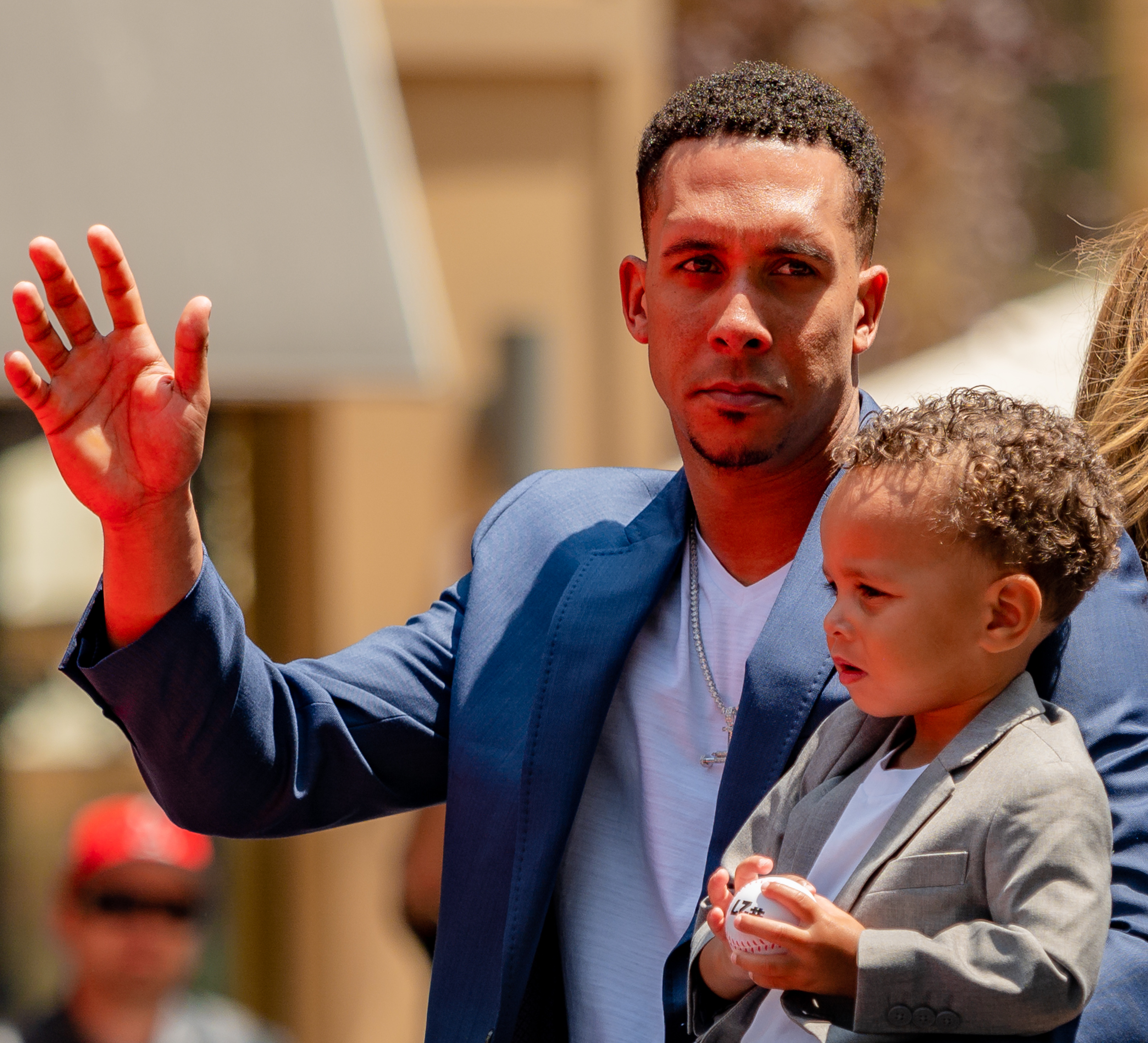
Michael Brantley hit two home runs in Game 4.

October 8, 2020 12:35 pm (PDT) at Dodger Stadium in Los Angeles, California
| Team | 1 | 2 | 3 | 4 | 5 | 6 | 7 | 8 | 9 | R | H | E |
|---|---|---|---|---|---|---|---|---|---|---|---|---|
| Oakland | 0 | 3 | 0 | 0 | 1 | 0 | 0 | 0 | 2 | 6 | 11 | 1 |
| Houston | 0 | 0 | 0 | 5 | 2 | 2 | 2 | 0 | X | 11 | 14 | 0 |
WP: Cristian Javier (1–0) LP: Frankie Montas (0–1); Home runs: OAK: Ramón Laureano 2 (2); HOU: Michael Brantley 2 (2), Carlos Correa (3), Jose Altuve (2); Attendance: N/A; Boxscore

In Game 4, the pattern of lead changes and home run balls flying would continue, as both teams combined for six home runs to contribute to a new record of home runs in a Division Series with 24 (the previous record being 22 by the 1995 ALDS), with both teams hitting twelve. One constant emerged from this game in a dearth of starting pitcher depth. In the second inning, Ramon Laureano started it off with a home run blast off Zack Greinke after consecutive singles to make it 3–0. In the fourth inning, Frankie Montas, like other starting Oakland pitchers before him, met his match. Jose Altuve led off the inning with a walk, and Michael Brantley responded with a home run to narrow the game to 3–2. Montas allowed two straight singles to bring up Carlos Correa. He hit a deep shot to left field to make it 5–3. Montas allowed two more singles before J.B. Wendelken was brought in to get the final out. Laureano responded in the fifth inning on the second pitch by Greinke to narrow it to 5–4, while Greinke lasted long enough to get two of the three outs before being taken out for the bullpen. The Astros continued the barrage with Brantley hitting his second home run, while two hits and walk resulted in one more run driven in by Correa to make it 7–4. In the sixth, they continued the scoring with hitting prowess, as Kyle Tucker and Correa each drove in RBIs on singles to make it 9–4. In the subsequent inning, Jose Altuve hit a home run off Jake Diekman to make the score 11–4. The bullpen for the Astros took over and held the fort together, allowing two runs on six hits as Cristian Javier led the way with 2 1/3 innings of work to receive the victory, with Khris Davis striking out with runners on second and first to finish off a 11–6 victory. The Athletics allowed six runs on seven hits in the finishing game in a series where they used all but one pitcher; despite taking the lead in each game (including being up by three runs in three of them), the Athletics had lost in the ALDS once again, having failed to advance past the round three times since 2006 (and six out of seven times overall). The Astros clinched their way to the American League Championship Series for the fourth straight year, becoming the fifth team to ever reach four straight LCS and the first since the St. Louis Cardinals did so from 2011 to 2014. This would prove to be the Athletics' final postseason game while the team was based in Oakland, as they will temporarily move to Sacramento in 2025 while a new ballpark in Las Vegas is constructed with the expectation it will open in time for the 2028 season.

=== Composite line score ===
2020 ALDS (3–1): Houston Astros beat Oakland Athletics

| Team | 1 | 2 | 3 | 4 | 5 | 6 | 7 | 8 | 9 | R | H | E |
|---|---|---|---|---|---|---|---|---|---|---|---|---|
| Houston Astros | 2 | 0 | 2 | 9 | 9 | 6 | 3 | 0 | 2 | 33 | 46 | 1 |
| Oakland Athletics | 1 | 7 | 1 | 3 | 3 | 0 | 3 | 2 | 2 | 22 | 36 | 3 |
Total attendance: N/A Average attendance: N/A

== See also ==
- 2020 National League Division Series
