= Mickey Brantley =

American baseball player (born 1961)

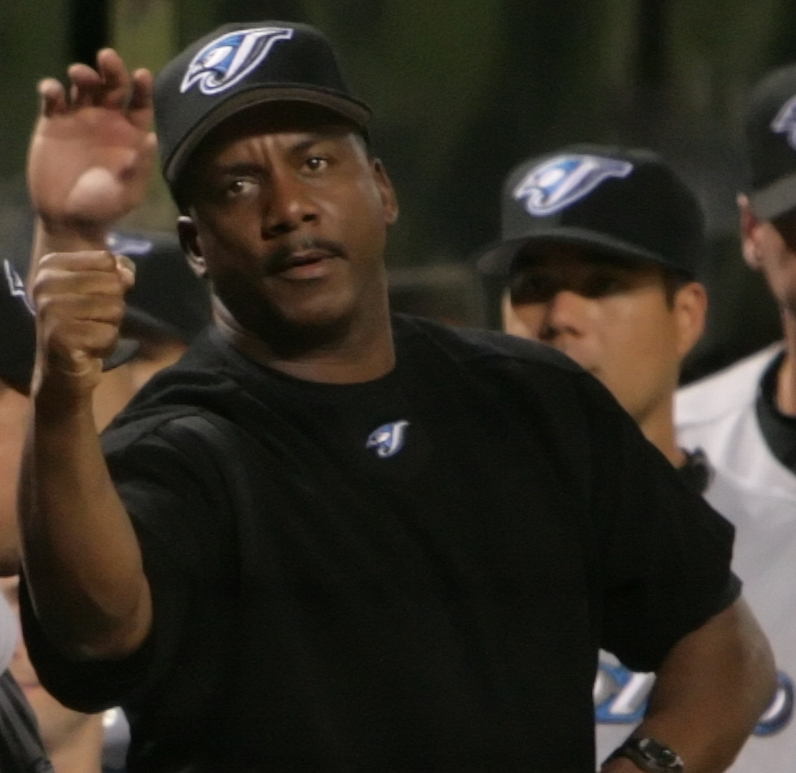
- Brantley with the Toronto Blue Jays in 2006
- Outfielder
- Born: June 17, 1961 (age 65); Catskill, New York, U.S.
- Batted: Right Threw: Right

Professional debut
- MLB: August 9, 1986, for the Seattle Mariners
- NPB: July 17, 1993, for the Yomiuri Giants

Last appearance
- MLB: June 1, 1989, for the Seattle Mariners
- NPB: 1993, for the Yomiuri Giants

MLB statistics
- Batting average: .259
- Home runs: 32
- Runs batted in: 125

NPB statistics
- Batting average: .182
- Home runs: 0
- Runs batted in: 4
- Stats at Baseball Reference

Teams
- Seattle Mariners (1986–1989); Yomiuri Giants (1993)

Michael Charles Brantley Sr. (born June 17, 1961) is an American former professional baseball player. He was the hitting coach for the Toronto Blue Jays of Major League Baseball (MLB) from early 2005 to September 2007.

== Early life ==
Brantley grew up in Catskill, New York, the sixth of eleven children—seven boys, four girls. His father was a foundry worker and his mother was a homemaker. He attended Catskill High School. Brantley went on to attend Columbia-Greene Community College, starred in soccer, basketball, and baseball, and still holds several school records. After one year at CGCC, he starred at Coastal Carolina University, and after his senior season, in 1983, was drafted by the Seattle Mariners in the second round (#30 overall). After 3+ successful years in the minors, he made his big league debut with the Seattle Mariners in 1986.

== Career ==
=== As player ===
Brantley played outfield and designated hitter during parts of four seasons, 1986–1989, all for the Seattle Mariners. As a rookie in 1987, he led the Mariner regulars in hitting with a .302 average, and also had 14 home runs and 54 RBI in 106 games. His only full season as a regular came in 1988 when he hit .263 with 15 HR and 56 RBI in 149 games. He spent the 1990–1993 seasons with several teams in the minor leagues, finally finishing his playing career with the Yomiuri Giants in Japan.

=== As coach and manager ===
Between 1994 and 2004, Brantley was a coach and manager in the minor leagues for the San Francisco Giants and New York Mets organizations. Prior to the 2005 season Brantley was named as the first base coach for the Toronto Blue Jays. After Mike Barnett was dismissed three weeks into the season, Brantley replaced him as the hitting coach. Brantley was released near the end of the 2007 season, as the Jays' offense that year was less productive than expected.

== Personal life ==
Brantley's son, Michael Brantley, played for the Houston Astros as an outfielder, and participated in the 2019 and 2021 World Series. His nephew, Justin Brantley, was a pitcher in the Indians organization from 2014 to 2017. Justin signed a minor league contract with the New York Mets and was released in 2017. In the early 1980s, teenage boxer Mike Tyson lived with Brantley and his family. After 17 years of marriage to Nina Brantley, Mickey and Nina divorced.
