= Ryan Yarbrough =

American baseball player (born 1991)

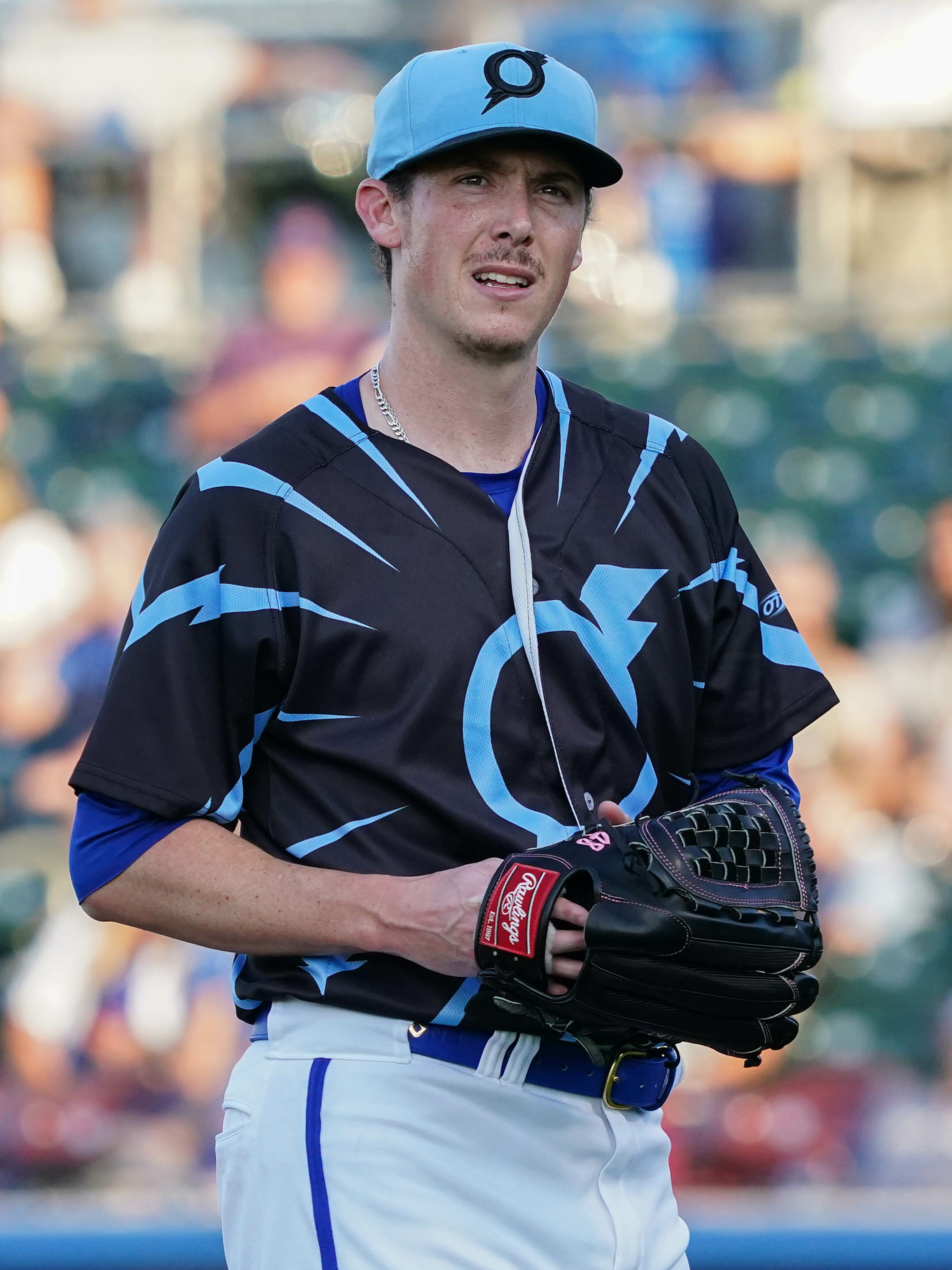
- Yarbrough with the Omaha Storm Chasers in 2023

Free agent
- Pitcher
- Born: December 31, 1991 (age 34); Austin, Texas, U.S.
- Bats: Right Throws: Left

MLB debut
- March 31, 2018, for the Tampa Bay Rays

MLB statistics (through 2026 season)
- Win–loss record: 58–42
- Earned run average: 4.18
- Strikeouts: 703
- Stats at Baseball Reference

Teams
- Tampa Bay Rays (2018–2022); Kansas City Royals (2023); Los Angeles Dodgers (2023–2024); Toronto Blue Jays (2024); New York Yankees (2025–2026)
Medals
Men's baseball
Representing the United States
World Baseball Classic
Silver medal – second place	2026 Miami	Team

Ryan Christian Yarbrough (born December 31, 1991) is an American professional baseball pitcher who is a free agent. He has played in Major League Baseball (MLB) for the Tampa Bay Rays, Kansas City Royals, Los Angeles Dodgers, Toronto Blue Jays, and New York Yankees. The Seattle Mariners selected Yarbrough in the fourth round of the 2014 MLB draft and he made his MLB debut with the Rays in 2018.

== Amateur career ==
After graduating from All Saints' Academy in Winter Haven, Florida, Yarbrough played college baseball at Santa Fe College in 2011 before transferring to Old Dominion University, where he pitched for the Monarchs in 2013 and 2014. He was drafted by the Milwaukee Brewers in the 20th round of the 2013 Major League Baseball draft but did not sign. In 2014, his senior season, he had a 6–7 win–loss record with a 4.50 earned run average (ERA) in 18 games played (14 starts).

== Professional career ==
=== Seattle Mariners ===
The Seattle Mariners selected Yarbrough in the fourth round of the 2014 MLB draft and he made his professional debut with the Pulaski Mariners. After two games, he was promoted to the Everett AquaSox. Overall, he pitched in 14 games (10 starts) and had a 1.27 ERA with 58 strikeouts in 42 2/3 innings pitched in 2014.

In 2015, he played for the Arizona League Mariners, Clinton LumberKings, and Bakersfield Blaze, where he compiled a combined 4–8 record and 4.10 ERA in 22 starts. In 2016, he pitched for the Jackson Generals where he was 12–4 with a 2.95 ERA and 1.11 WHIP in 25 starts.

=== Tampa Bay Rays ===
On January 11, 2017, the Mariners traded Yarbrough, Mallex Smith, and Carlos Vargas to the Tampa Bay Rays for pitcher Drew Smyly. Yarbrough spent the season with the Durham Bulls where he pitched to a 13–6 record and 3.43 ERA in 26 starts. The Rays added him to their 40-man roster after the season.

Yarbrough made the Rays' Opening Day roster in 2018, making his debut against the Boston Red Sox on March 31, pitching four innings, allowing one run and recording three strikeouts. His first MLB strikeout was of Brock Holt. Yarbrough finished the season with 16 wins, the most for a rookie in franchise history, the most for a rookie in the 2018 season, and the second-most on the team. He finished his rookie season posting an earned run average of 3.91 over 141 1/3 innings despite working predominantly out of the bullpen. Yarbrough was mainly utilized as the "bulk guy" behind the Rays' new opener strategy.

On April 24, 2019, Yarbrough was optioned to Triple-A after registering an ERA of 8.10 in his first five appearances of the season. He rejoined the Rays on May 23. On July 14, against the Baltimore Orioles, after Ryne Stanek opened with two perfect innings, Yarbrough then pitched six perfect innings of his own, losing the combined perfect game bid to a leadoff single in the ninth inning. His run of success continued in the season's second half, as he improved his ERA to 3.51 and his WHIP to 0.88 by September 10, which would have been second-best in MLB among starting pitchers if Yarbrough pitched enough innings to qualify. He struggled in his last few starts and finished the season 11–6 with a 4.13 ERA, 0.99 WHIP and 117 strikeouts over 141 2/3 innings. He pitched three scoreless innings as a reliever in the American League (AL) Division Series against the Houston Astros.

Due to many injuries to their pitching staff to begin the 2020 season, Yarbrough was used exclusively in the rotation before suffering a groin injury and being placed on the disabled list on August 29. For the season, he was 1-4 with a 3.56 ERA in 11 games, while leading the AL in hit batsmen, with seven. He pitched five innings in Game 4 of the Division Series against the New York Yankees, allowing two runs on six hits and started the third game of the AL Championship Series, picking up the win. In the World Series against the Los Angeles Dodgers, Yarbrough pitched in three games, starting one of them, and allowed two earned runs on seven hits in 4 2/3 innings.

On June 3, 2021, Yarbrough threw a complete game victory against the Yankees at Yankee Stadium, the first Rays complete game by a pitcher since Matt Andriese in May 2016. The five-year drought was the longest in the league. It was Yarbrough's first career complete game and first win as a starter in the regular season since he pitched into the ninth inning against the Mariners at Safeco Field in 2019. For the season, he was 9–7 with a 5.11 ERA in 30 games (21 starts).

Yarbrough made 30 appearances (nine starts) in 2022 for the Rays, with a 3–8 record and 4.50 ERA. Following the season, on November 15, the Rays designated him for assignment and he was non-tendered and became a free agent on November 18.

=== Kansas City Royals ===
On December 13, 2022, Yarbrough signed a one-year, $3 million contract with the Kansas City Royals. In a May 7, 2023, game against the Oakland Athletics, he was struck in the head by a 106-mph line drive off the bat of Ryan Noda. He was later diagnosed with multiple non-displaced fractures around his right eye and placed on the injured list. He did not rejoin the active roster until July 9. Yarbrough pitched in 14 games, making seven starts for the Royals with a 4–5 record and 4.24 ERA in 51 innings.

=== Los Angeles Dodgers ===
On August 1, 2023, Yarbrough was traded to the Los Angeles Dodgers for Devin Mann and Derlin Figueroa. He pitched in 11 games (two starts), compiling a 4–2 record and 4.89 ERA with 38 strikeouts. Yarbrough agreed to a $3.9 million contract with the Dodgers for 2024 in salary arbitration. In 32 games, he was 4–2 with a 3.74 ERA and 39 strikeouts. Yarbrough was designated for assignment on July 29, 2024.

=== Toronto Blue Jays ===
On July 30, 2024, the Dodgers traded Yarbrough to the Toronto Blue Jays for Kevin Kiermaier. In 12 appearances for Toronto, Yarbrough logged a 1–0 record and 2.01 ERA with 26 strikeouts across 31 1/3 innings pitched.

On February 20, 2025, Yarbrough re-signed with the Blue Jays on a minor league contract. On March 21, Yarbrough exercised the opt-out on his contract after being cut from the major league roster. On March 23, he was granted free agency.

=== New York Yankees ===
On March 24, 2025, Yarbrough signed a one-year, $2 million contract with the New York Yankees, including a reported $250,000 in incentives. Yarbrough said he chose the Yankees over a similar offer from the Blue Jays, which included a clause allowing the team to terminate the guaranteed portion of his salary within 45 days, because New York offered different incentives. Yarbrough got out to a strong start in New York, beginning in the bullpen and moving to the rotation in May and posting a 2.08 ERA in his first five starts. Yarbrough had one of the slowest fastball in the majors, averaging 87.5 miles per hour. He made 19 appearances (eight starts) for the team, posting a 3-1 record and 4.36 ERA with 55 strikeouts and one save over 64 innings of work.

On November 17, 2025, Yarbrough re-signed with the Yankees on a one-year, $2.5 million contract.

== Personal life ==
Yarbrough is a Christian. He and his wife, Nicole, married in 2019 and had their first child, a daughter, in 2021. A second daughter was born in 2023.

Yarborough played for the United States national baseball team in the 2026 World Baseball Classic.
