= Randy Arozarena =

Cuban-Mexican baseball player (born 1995)

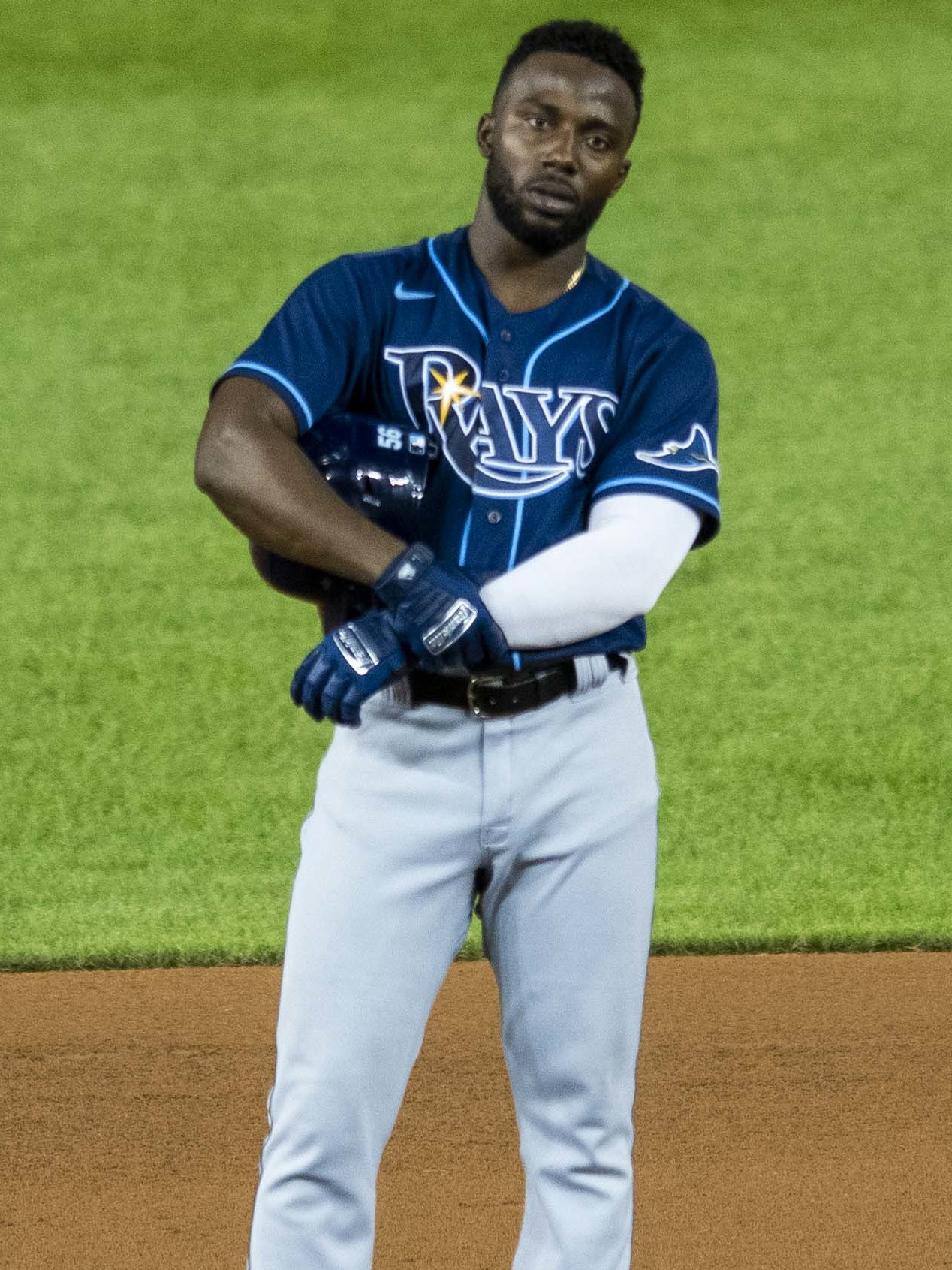
- Arozarena with the Tampa Bay Rays in 2020

Free agent
- Left fielder
- Born: February 28, 1995 (age 31); Arroyos de Mantua, Pinar del Río, Cuba
- Bats: Right Throws: Right

MLB debut
- August 14, 2019, for the St. Louis Cardinals

MLB statistics (through 2026 season)
- Batting average: .255
- Home runs: 144
- Runs batted in: 469
- Stolen bases: 157
- Stats at Baseball Reference

Teams
- St. Louis Cardinals (2019); Tampa Bay Rays (2020–2024); Seattle Mariners (2024–2026)

Career highlights and awards
- 3× All-Star (2023, 2025, 2026); AL Rookie of the Year (2021); ALCS MVP (2020); Silver Slugger Award (2026)
Medals
Men's baseball
Representing Cuba
18U Baseball World Cup
Bronze medal – third place	2013 Taichung	Team
Representing Mexico
World Baseball Classic
Bronze medal – third place	2023 Miami	Team

Randy Lia Arozarena González (born February 28, 1995) is a Cuban-born Mexican professional baseball left fielder who is a free agent. He has played in Major League Baseball (MLB) for the St. Louis Cardinals, Tampa Bay Rays, and Seattle Mariners. He has represented Mexico in senior international baseball competition, after previously playing for Cuban youth teams.

Arozarena defected from Cuba to Mexico in 2015, then signed with the Cardinals in 2016. He made his MLB debut in 2019 and was traded to the Rays before the 2020 season. That year, Arozarena set the MLB record with 10 home runs in one postseason. Four of those came against the Houston Astros in the American League Championship Series, netting him series MVP honors. The following year, he won the AL Rookie of the Year award. He was named to his first All-Star Game in 2023, where he started in left field. Tampa Bay traded him to Seattle during the 2024 season, and he was again named an All-Star in 2025 and 2026 with the Mariners. After the 2026 season, he was awarded his first ever Silver Slugger Award and became a free agent.

== Professional career ==
=== Cuban and Mexican career ===
During the 2013–14 and 2014–15 seasons, Arozarena played for Vegueros de Pinar del Río of the Cuban National Series. In his final season, he slashed .291/.412/.419 with three home runs, 24 runs batted in (RBI), and 15 stolen bases in 74 games played.

In 2015, Arozarena defected from Cuba to Mexico on a small boat. He had brief stints in the Mérida Winter League, the Norte de México League, and with the Toros de Tijuana of the Mexican League in 2016, before playing for the Mayos de Navojoa of the Mexican Pacific League in the winter after the 2016 season.

=== St. Louis Cardinals ===
==== Minor leagues ====
Arozarena signed with St. Louis Cardinals as an international free agent on August 1, 2016, for $1.25 million. He debuted in the United States 2017 with the Palm Beach Cardinals, with whom he was named a Florida State League All-Star, before advancing to the Springfield Cardinals at the beginning of July. He had a combined .266 batting average with 11 home runs, 49 RBI, and 18 stolen bases over 121 games with both clubs. Following the season, he returned to the Mayos de Navojoa, where he slashed .292/.366/.558 and led the Mexican Pacific League with 14 home runs in 65 games. The Mayos made it to the championship series. Although the team did not win the series, Arozarena had a walk-off hit in the bottom of the ninth inning in Game 6.

Arozarena was a non-roster invitee to the Cardinals' 2018 spring training. He began the season with the Memphis Redbirds. In July, he was selected to the All-Star Futures Game. Arozarena also played 24 games in the middle of the season down with Springfield. He helped Memphis win the Pacific Coast League (PCL) title and was named a co-MVP of the PCL playoffs with teammate Tommy Edman. Over 113 games between Memphis and Springfield, he batted .274/.359/.433 with 12 home runs, 49 RBI, and 26 stolen bases. Arozarena played a third season of winter baseball for Mayos de Navojoa in 2018, appearing in 15 games.

==== 2019: MLB debut ====
Arozarena began the 2019 season on the injured list after he suffered a fractured hand during spring training. He returned to action in May with Springfield before being promoted back to Memphis in June.

On August 12, 2019, the Cardinals selected Arozarena's contract and promoted him to the major leagues. He made his major league debut on August 14 against the Kansas City Royals.

Arozarena said he promised his father before dying that he would make it to the major leagues and that after getting multiple hits on his very first day, it gave him extra pressure for the next game.

He was sent down to Memphis on August 20 but returned to St. Louis on September 3. In 19 games with St. Louis, Arozarena hit .300 with one home run, two RBIs, and two stolen bases. He came off the bench in five Cardinals postseason games, going 0-for-4 and getting hit by a pitch after sticking his elbow into an off-speed pitch from Aníbal Sánchez.

=== Tampa Bay Rays ===
==== 2020: LCS MVP ====
On January 9, 2020, Arozarena was traded to the Tampa Bay Rays with José Martínez and the Cardinals’ competitive balance round A draft pick for Matthew Liberatore, Edgardo Rodriguez, and the Rays’ competitive balance round B draft pick. Arozarena started the shortened 2020 season on the COVID-19 minor league injured list, joining the Rays on August 30. Over 23 games in the regular season, Arozarena batted .281 with seven home runs and 11 RBIs.

Arozarena took off in the expanded 2020 postseason. He had three extra base hits and scored three runs in the two-game Wild Card Series, then batted .429 with 3 home runs in the five-game American League Division Series (ALDS) win over the New York Yankees. In Game 7 of the American League Championship Series (ALCS) against the Houston Astros, Arozarena hit a two-run home run, passing former Ray Evan Longoria for the most home runs by a rookie in a postseason. Arozarena was named the MVP of the ALCS, the first rookie position player to win the award. In the series, he hit .321 with four home runs and six RBIs. Arozarena then hit home runs in Game 3, 4, and 6 of the World Series, breaking the all-time record for most home runs in a single postseason. In Game 3, he surpassed Derek Jeter for most hits by a rookie in the postseason. In Game 5, he recorded his 27th hit in the postseason, surpassing Pablo Sandoval for the most hits in a single postseason (he was subsequently passed by Ernie Clement in 2025). Arozarena attributed his playoff power stroke to wearing a special pair of lucky cowboy boots, which he calls his "power boots."

==== 2021: Rookie of the Year ====
For the 2021 season, Arozarena batted .274/.356/.459 with 20 home runs, 69 RBIs, and 20 stolen bases in 141 games. His on-base plus slugging (OPS) was 29 percent above league average. In Game 1 of the ALDS against the Boston Red Sox, he became the first player to hit a home run and steal home in the same playoff game. Arozarena won the AL Rookie of the Year Award, the first Ray to do so since Wil Myers in 2013.

==== 2022 season ====
In 2022, Arozarena stole 32 bases, tied for third in the majors, but he also led the major leagues by being caught stealing 12 times. He batted .269/.344/.463 with 20 home runs and an OPS 24 percent better than the MLB average.

==== 2023: All-Star starter ====
The Rays created a "Randy Land" fan seating section behind Arozarena in left field early in the 2023 season. Arozarena was voted by fans to be a starting outfielder in the MLB All-Star Game, his first All-Star Game selection. He also competed in the Home Run Derby, losing to Vladimir Guerrero Jr. in the final round. On August 12, Arozarena hit a walk-off single against Emmanuel Clase. On August 31, Arozarena stole third base against the Miami Marlins and became the first MLB player to record three straight 20–20 seasons to begin his career. He finished the season with a then-career-best 23 home runs and 80 walks, batting .254/.364/.425 with 22 stolen bases. He went 3-for-8 in the Wild Card Series, as the Rays were swept in two games by the eventual World Series champion Texas Rangers.

==== 2024 season ====
Arozarena slumped to start 2024, batting .158 at the end of May. With the Rays in last place in mid-June, rumors of the team looking to trade Arozarena began to spread. His hitting improved somewhat, and he hit .211/.318/.394 with 15 home runs in 100 games for the Rays. In five seasons with Tampa Bay, Arozarena hit .255 with 85 home runs and 94 stolen bases.

Arozarena is the Rays' franchise leader with 59 hit by pitches, one ahead of Brandon Guyer, and ranks in the top 10 in many offensive categories, including home runs, stolen bases, and OPS. He also holds many Rays postseason records, including most hits, home runs, and total bases, batting .349 in 28 games.

=== Seattle Mariners ===
==== 2024 season ====
On July 25, 2024, Arozarena was traded to the Seattle Mariners for Brody Hopkins, Aidan Smith, and Ty Cummings. Arozarena said goodbye to Rays fans in "Randy Land" following the trade. Arozarena hit his 20th home run on September 15, completing his fourth consecutive 20–20 season. Combined with the Rays and Mariners in 2024, Arozarena slashed .254/.346/.436 with the 20 home runs and 20 stolen bases as well as 60 RBI in 648 plate appearances. He tied for the lowest line drive percentage in MLB, at 14.4 percent.

==== 2025 season: Second All-Star selection ====
Arozarena started for the Mariners on 2025 Opening Day and hit a game-tying home run in the eighth inning to help lead Seattle to a 4-2 over the Athletics.

On April 9, Arozarena hit a grand slam and drew a walk-off walk to defeat the Houston Astros. On June 30, he hit two home runs, including his 100th career home run off Royals pitcher Michael Wacha as he went 2-for-4 with those two home runs and four RBI. Arozarena was named an All-Star for the second time in his career, replacing teammate Julio Rodríguez. Arozarena stole his 20th stolen base on July 29, completing his fifth consecutive 20–20 season. He tied Mike Trout for third-most 20–20 seasons in American League history behind Alex Rodriguez (six) and José Ramírez (seven). In 2025, Arozarena hit .238/.334/.426 with a career-high 27 home runs as well as 31 stolen bases and 76 RBI across 160 games. In the 2025 postseason, Arozarena led the majors with five stolen bases. He hit .188 with one home run as the Mariners lost in the ALCS.

==== 2026 season: Silver Slugger Award ====
In 2026, Arozarena was named an All-Star for the second consecutive season, and for the third time in his career. He played in a total of 156 games for the Mariners and ended the season with a .281/.381/.484 slash line with 26 home runs, 79 RBI, and 26 stolen bases and was awarded his first ever Silver Slugger Award. After the season, Arozarena declined Seattle's qualifying offer for $23.15 million and became a free agent for the first time in his career.

== International career ==
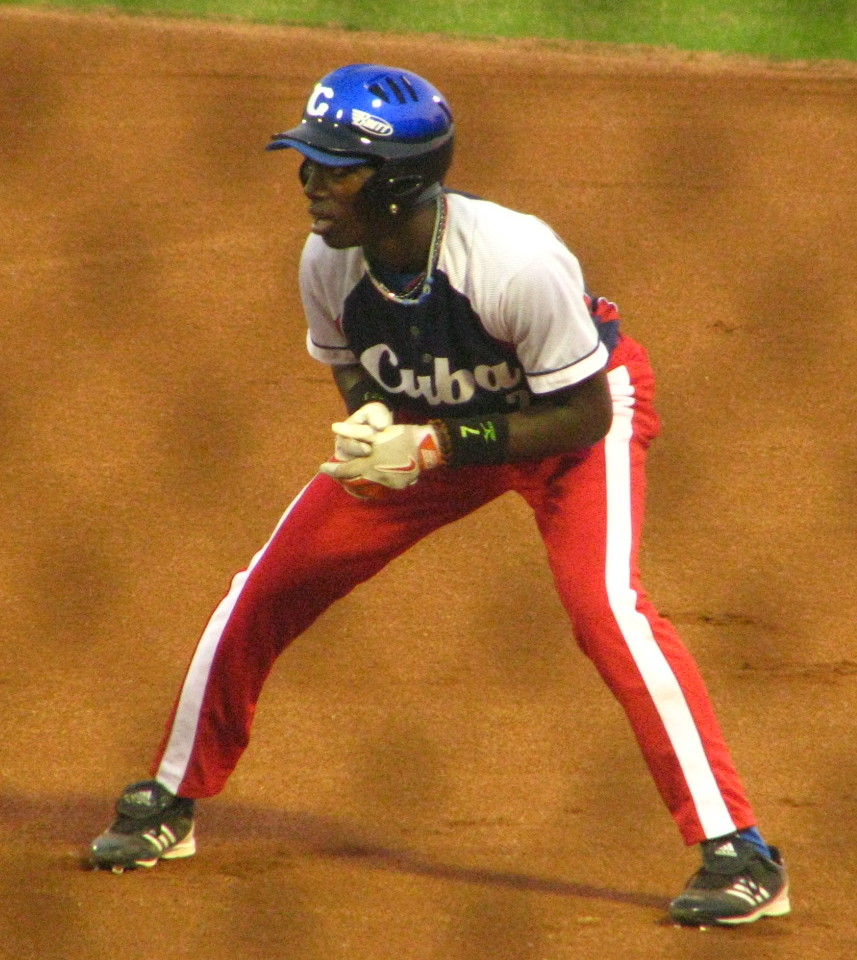
Arozarena with Cuba at the 2013 18U Baseball World Cup

Before his defection, Arozarena represented his home country of Cuba at the youth level, playing in the 2011 U-16 Baseball World Cup and the 2013 U-18 Baseball World Cup in Taichung, where Cuba won the bronze medal.

Arozarena announced his intention to play for Mexico in 2020, saying "I feel like I represent Mexico. I have a daughter in Mexico, and I’d do it in honor of her and for the part of my career that I spent in Mexico, and for all the friends I’ve made in Mexico.” In October 2022, MLB announced that Arozarena would play for Mexico in the 2023 World Baseball Classic.

Arozarena was named the most valuable player of Pool C in the tournament, besting Mike Trout. In the semifinal game against Japan, Arozarena hit a double to score the go-ahead run and made several timely catches, including a "home-run robbery" from Kazuma Okamoto. However, Mexico would lose the game on a walk-off double in the bottom of the ninth inning. Arozarena led Mexico in many offensive categories, batting .450/.607/.900 with six doubles, one home run, and nine RBIs in the tournament. Mexican President Andrés Manuel López Obrador called Arozarena a "phenomenon" for his tournament performance. Arozarena was named to the All-WBC team; he and Trea Turner were the only unanimous selections. Arozarena received his all-tournament award from Mexican Foreign Secretary Marcelo Ebrard at a Rays game on May 21, 2023.

== Personal life ==
Arozarena was born in Cuba, growing up in the neighborhood of Arroyos de Mantua. As a child, he first played soccer before committing to baseball as a 12-year-old because he could earn money playing it. Shortly after his father Jesús died, he fled Cuba in June 2015 on a small, broken boat, traveling eight or nine hours to Isla Mujeres, Mexico, where he established residency before signing his first MLB contract.

Arozarena is married to Cenelia Pinedo Blanco and has two daughters, one of whom was born in Mexico in 2018. On November 23, 2020, Arozarena was arrested in Mexico's Yucatán state after allegedly trying to kidnap his daughter from her mother and assaulting the woman's father. He was released two days later as the child's mother did not press charges. Arozarena's second daughter was born in 2021.

Fellow Cuban outfielder Adolis García is the godfather of one of Arozarena's daughters. The two outfielders were teammates and roommates in the Cardinals' minor league system, and Arozarena described Garcia as "kind of like my brother" in 2023. The two friends both started in the outfield in the 2023 All-Star Game, after Arozarena bested Garcia in the Home Run Derby.

Arozarena's younger brother is soccer player Raiko Arozarena, currently a goalkeeper for the Cuban national team and the New Mexico United of the USL Championship. His family also includes his mother Sandra and his other younger brother Ronny.

In 2020, a film based on Arozarena's life was being developed with an estimated release in 2022 or 2023. Arozarena confirmed in 2023 that the film had fallen through but said he still wanted to make a movie about his life.

Arozarena became a Mexican citizen in 2022, prior to representing the country in international baseball.

Arozarena loves soccer and is a fan of Real Madrid and Cristiano Ronaldo.

== See also ==
- List of baseball players who defected from Cuba
- List of Major League Baseball career hit by pitch leaders
- List of Major League Baseball players from Cuba
- Tampa Bay Rays award winners and league leaders
