= Ji-man Choi =

Korean baseball player (born 1991)

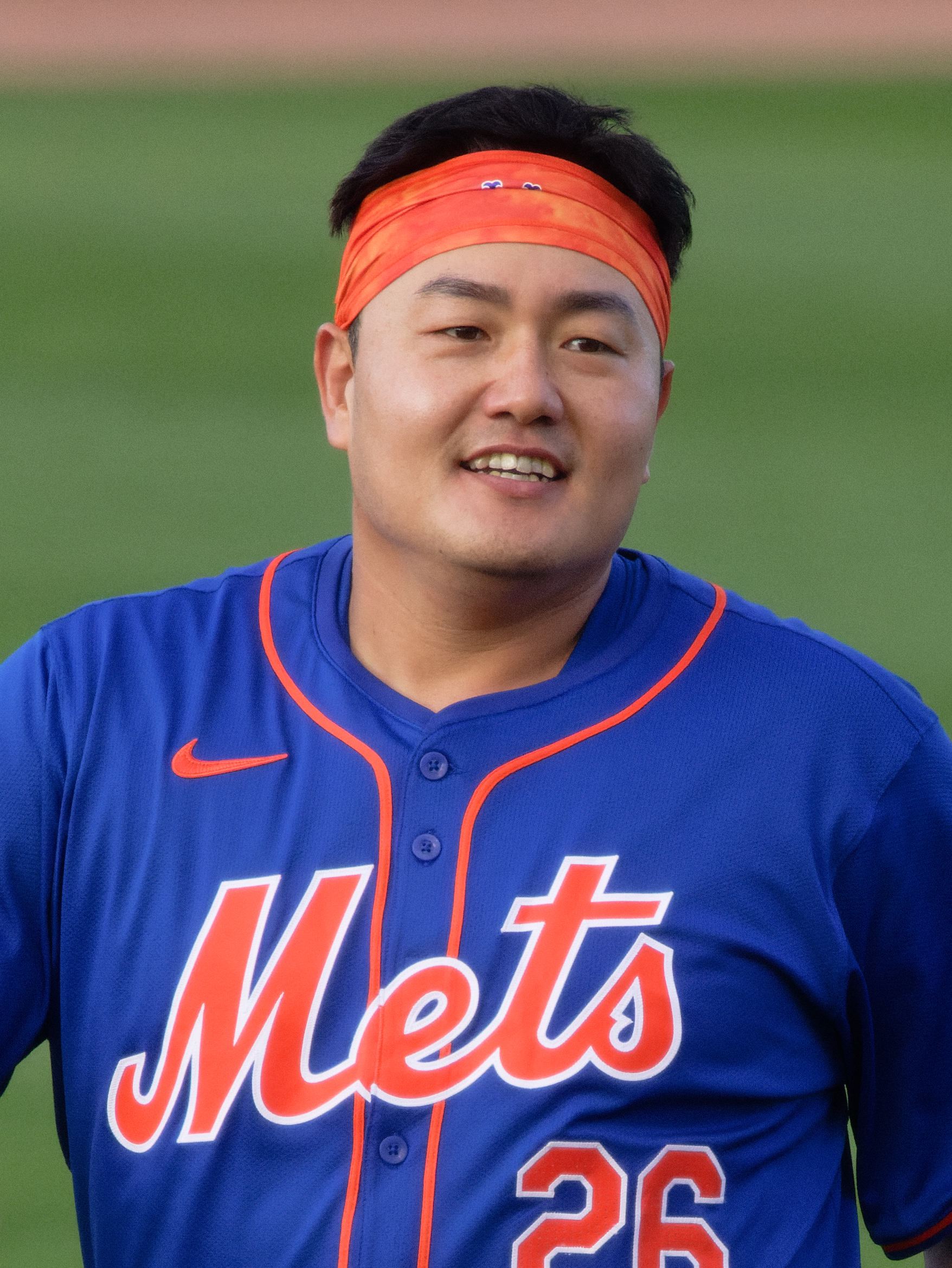
- Choi with the New York Mets in 2024

Free agent
- First baseman / Designated hitter
- Born: May 19, 1991 (age 35); Incheon, South Korea
- Bats: Left Throws: Right

MLB debut
- April 5, 2016, for the Los Angeles Angels

MLB statistics (through 2023 season)
- Batting average: .234
- Home runs: 67
- Runs batted in: 238
- Stats at Baseball Reference

Teams
- Los Angeles Angels (2016); New York Yankees (2017); Milwaukee Brewers (2018); Tampa Bay Rays (2018–2022); Pittsburgh Pirates (2023); San Diego Padres (2023)

- Ji-man Choi
- Hangul: 최지만
- Hanja: 崔志萬
- RR: Choe Jiman
- MR: Ch'oe Chiman

Ji-man Choi (Korean: 최지만; Hanja: 崔志萬; Korean pronunciation: [tɕʰwe̞.dʑi.man]; born May 19, 1991) is a South Korean professional baseball designated hitter and first baseman for the Ulsan Whales of the KBO Futures League. He has previously played in Major League Baseball (MLB) for the Los Angeles Angels, New York Yankees, Milwaukee Brewers, Tampa Bay Rays, Pittsburgh Pirates, and San Diego Padres. Choi signed with the Seattle Mariners in 2010 and made his MLB debut with the Angels in 2016. His longest tenure was with the Rays, playing for the team from 2018 to 2022.

== Career ==
=== Seattle Mariners ===
Choi signed with the Seattle Mariners before the 2010 season and was sent to their AZL affiliate. With the Arizona League Mariners, Choi batted .378 with 23 runs scored, 51 hits, 15 doubles, two triples, one home run, 23 runs batted in (RBI), and 10 stolen bases in 39 games played. Amongst league batters, Choi was second in on-base percentage (.459), and slugging percentage (.541). Choi also played 11 games with the High-A High Desert Mavericks of the California League that season. On August 24, in a game against the Inland Empire 66ers, Choi hit his first and only home run with the Mavericks. With the Mavericks, he batted .302 with seven runs scored, 13 hits, one double, one triple, one home run, and seven RBIs. Combined between the two teams, Choi batted .360 with 30 runs scored, 64 hits, 16 doubles, three triples, two home runs, and 30 RBIs in 50 games played. On defense between the two clubs, he played 34 games as a first baseman and 10 as a catcher, committing two errors; and making 39 assists, and 326 putouts. After the season, he was named the Arizona League Most Valuable Player. The Seattle Mariners named Choi as their top position player on their Arizona League affiliate.

Choi played for the Jackson Generals of the Double-A Southern League in 2013. He was named to the World Team roster of the All-Star Futures Game. Choi was added to the Mariners 40-man roster on November 20, 2013. On April 17, 2014, Choi was suspended for 50 games after testing positive for methandienone.

Choi sustained a fractured fibula in the first game of Mariners' spring training in 2015, as he leaped at first base to try to save an errant throw from farmhand Tyler Smith at shortstop. The next day, he was designated for assignment when the Mariners re-added left-hander Edgar Olmos.

=== Los Angeles Angels ===
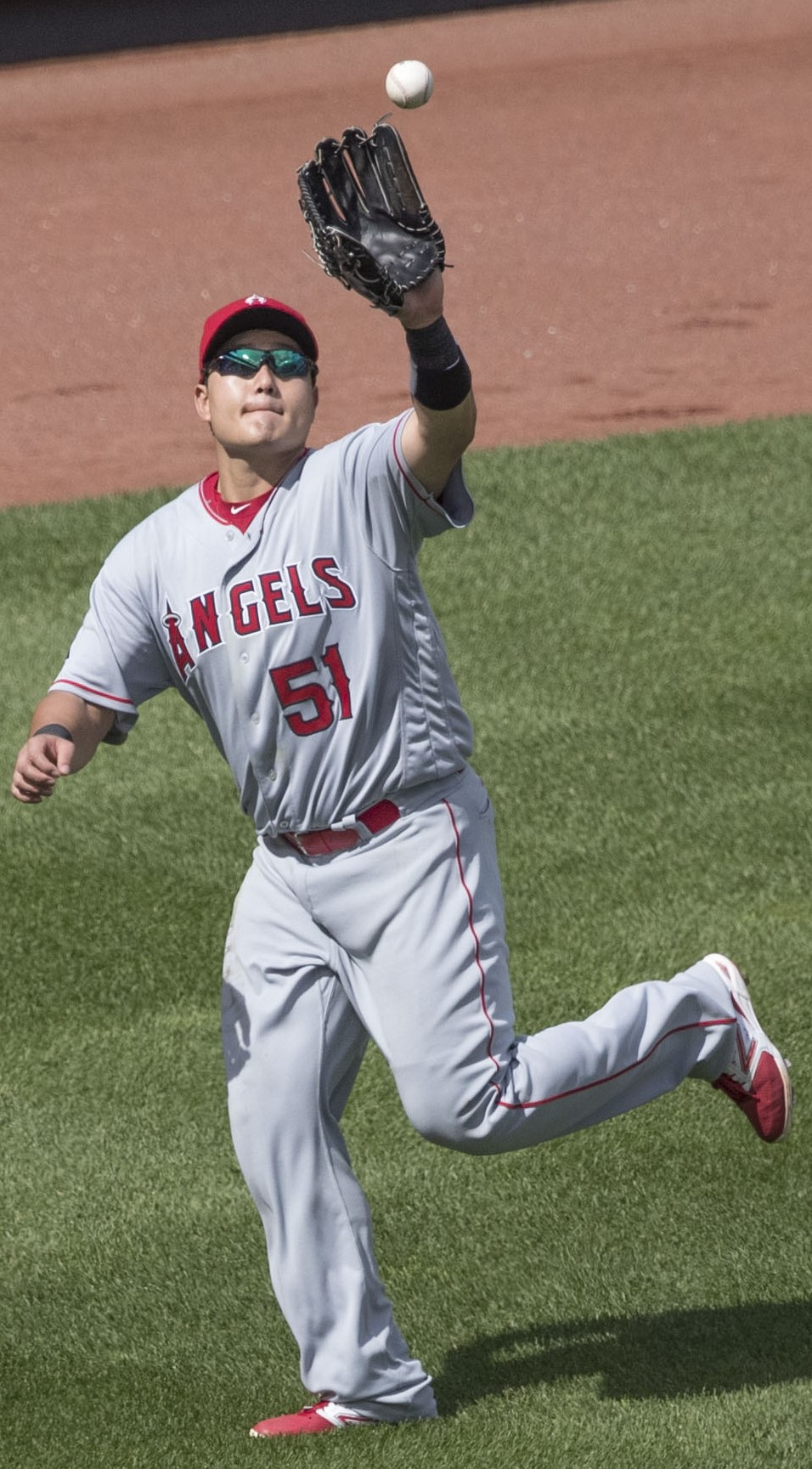
Choi with the Angels in 2016

On November 24, 2015, Choi signed a minor league contract with the Baltimore Orioles organization. On December 10, the Los Angeles Angels (then known as the Los Angeles Angels of Anaheim) selected Choi from the Orioles in the Rule 5 draft.

Choi made the Angels' Opening Day roster, and he made his major league debut on April 5, 2016. Choi was designated for assignment by the Angels on May 11. On May 15, Choi cleared waivers and accepted an outright to the Salt Lake Bees of the Triple-A Pacific Coast League. Choi returned to the majors on July 9 in place of injured C. J. Cron. Choi hit his first career major league home run off Texas Rangers starter A. J. Griffin at Angel Stadium of Anaheim on July 19. In 54 appearances for the Angels during his rookie campaign, he slashed .170/.271/.339 with five home runs, 12 RBI, and two stolen bases. On December 23, Choi was designated for assignment.

=== New York Yankees ===
On January 14, 2017, Choi signed a minor league contract with the New York Yankees, receiving a non-roster invitation to spring training. At the end of spring training he was assigned to the Scranton/Wilkes-Barre RailRiders of the Triple-A International League. The Yankees promoted Choi to the major leagues on July 4. In his first game with the Yankees, he hit a 457-foot (139 m) two-run home run. Choi was designated for assignment on July 19, and assigned outright to the Triple-A Scranton/Wilkes-Barre RailRiders on July 23.

=== Milwaukee Brewers ===
On January 15, 2018, Choi signed a minor league deal with the Milwaukee Brewers. His contract was purchased by the Brewers on March 28, and he was assigned to the Opening Day roster. After an assignment to the Triple-A Colorado Springs Sky Sox, Choi was recalled on May 18, to the Brewers active roster. He homered in his first at-bat as designated hitter against the Minnesota Twins. On June 9, Choi hit his first career grand slam as a pinch-hitter in the sixth inning of a Brewers-Phillies game. It was the Milwaukee Brewers' first grand slam of the season.

=== Tampa Bay Rays ===
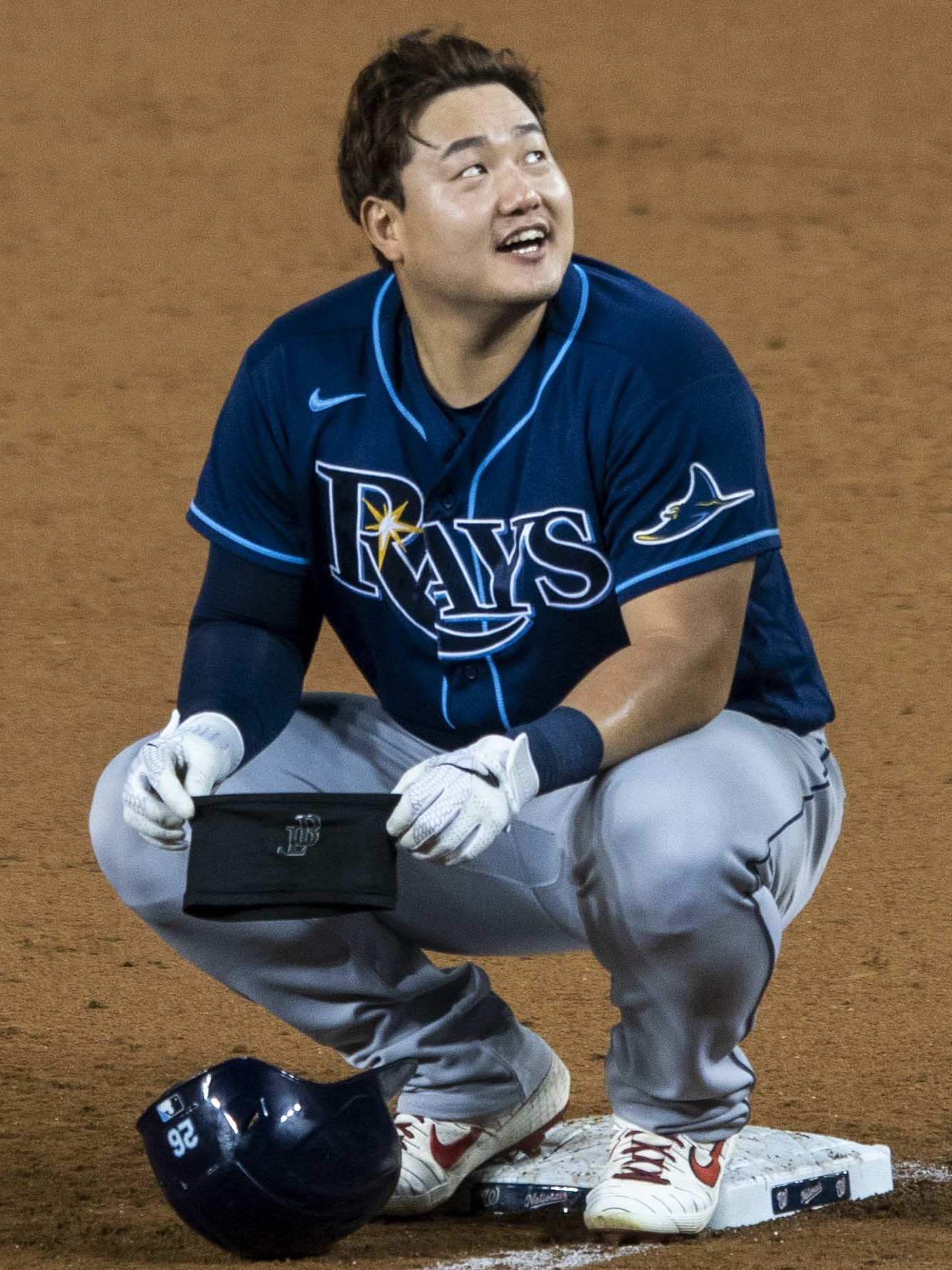
Choi with the Rays in 2020

One day after his grand slam with the Brewers, Choi was traded to the Tampa Bay Rays for infielder Brad Miller and cash. Choi was immediately optioned to the Triple-A Durham Bulls. The Rays promoted Choi to the major leagues on July 11, 2018. On September 10, he hit a walk-off two-run homer against Brad Hand of the Cleveland Indians. In 49 games for the Rays, Choi hit .269 with eight home runs and 27 RBIs.

In 2019, Choi played in 127 games, hitting .261 with 19 home runs and 63 RBI. On September 24, Choi hit a 12th-inning walk-off home run against the Yankees. In the postseason, he had three hits in 23 at-bats, recording one solo home run. The Rays were defeated by the Houston Astros in the Division Series. In his first full year with the Rays, Choi established himself as a fan favorite due to his performance and attitude on the field.

On July 26, 2020, Choi made his first appearance as a switch hitter in his career, batting right-handed twice against left-handed Toronto Blue Jays pitcher Anthony Kay. In his second appearance against Kay, he hit a home run. Choi ended the year batting .230/.331/.410 with 3 home runs in 42 games. In game one of the American League Division Series against the New York Yankees, he hit a two-run home run against Gerrit Cole. This was his third home run against Cole in 2020, improving his career numbers to 10-for-19 with four home runs against him. In Game 2 of the 2020 World Series, Choi singled to right field, becoming the first Korean player to record a hit in the World Series.

Choi played in 83 games for the Rays in 2021, batting .229/.348/.411 with 11 home runs and 45 RBIs. On November 30, 2021, Choi signed a $3.2 million contract with the Rays, avoiding salary arbitration.

=== Pittsburgh Pirates ===
On November 10, 2022, Choi was traded to the Pittsburgh Pirates in exchange for pitcher Jack Hartman.

On April 19, 2023, it was announced that Choi would miss at least eight weeks with a left Achilles strain. He was activated from the injured list on July 7.

=== San Diego Padres ===
On August 1, 2023, Choi and Rich Hill were traded to the San Diego Padres in exchange for Alfonso Rivas, Estuar Suero, and Jackson Wolf. After going hitless in seven games for the Padres, Choi was placed on the injured list with a left rib strain on August 14. On September 5, he began a rehab assignment with the Triple-A El Paso Chihuahuas. However, that day, Choi suffered a Lisfranc fracture after fouling a ball off of his right foot. Despite the injury, Choi resumed his rehab the next week and was activated from the injured list on September 15. He became a free agent following the season.

=== New York Mets ===
On February 16, 2024, Choi signed a minor league contract with the New York Mets that included an invitation to spring training. In 26 games for the Triple-A Syracuse Mets, he batted .191/.317/.357 with four home runs and 12 RBI. On May 31, Choi requested and was granted his release from the Mets organization.

After going unsigned after the 2024 season, Choi returned to South Korea in May 2025 to begin his compulsory military service. He said plans to play in the KBO League in 2027.
