= Michael Brantley =

American baseball player (born 1987)

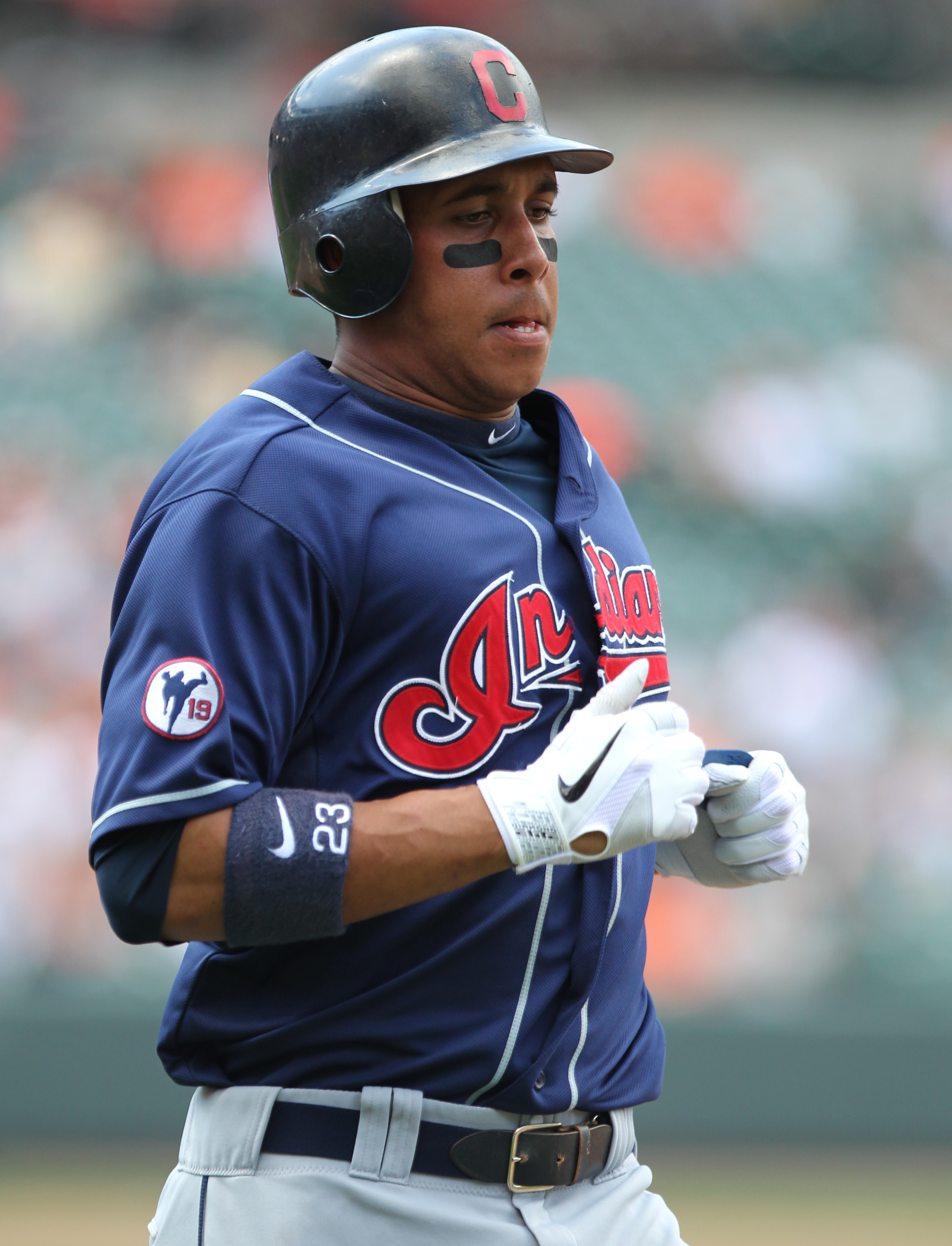
- Brantley with the Indians in 2011
- Outfielder
- Born: May 15, 1987 (age 39); Bellevue, Washington, U.S.
- Batted: Left Threw: Left

MLB debut
- September 1, 2009, for the Cleveland Indians

Last MLB appearance
- October 1, 2023, for the Houston Astros

MLB statistics
- Batting average: .298
- Home runs: 129
- Runs batted in: 720
- Stats at Baseball Reference

Teams
- Cleveland Indians (2009–2018); Houston Astros (2019–2023)

Career highlights and awards
- 5× All-Star (2014, 2017–2019, 2021); Silver Slugger Award (2014)

Michael Charles Brantley Jr. (born May 15, 1987), is an American former professional baseball outfielder. He played in Major League Baseball (MLB) for the Cleveland Indians and the Houston Astros. The son of former MLB player and hitting coach Mickey Brantley, he is a left-handed batter and thrower.

After starring for Fort Pierce Central High School in Fort Pierce, Florida, the Milwaukee Brewers selected Brantley in the seventh round of the 2005 MLB draft. During the 2008 season, the Brewers traded him to the Indians along with other prospects for pitcher CC Sabathia. Brantley made his MLB debut with the Indians in 2009.

During the 2014 campaign, Brantley won both an MLB All-Star nomination and a Silver Slugger Award for the first time. That year, he achieved career highs in numerous offensive categories and garnered a third-place finish in the American League (AL) Most Valuable Player (MVP) Award voting. He was subsequently named to four consecutive All-Star team between 2017 and 2021. (Note: No All-Star Game was held in 2020 due to the COVID-19 pandemic.) Brantley finished in the top ten in batting average in the AL six times. He appeared in two World Series (2019 and 2021) as a member of the Astros.

== Early life ==
Brantley was born in Bellevue, Washington. His father, Mickey Brantley, played in Major League Baseball (MLB), and was a member of the Seattle Mariners at the time Michael was born. Michael was raised in Port St. Lucie, Florida. Starting at age seven, Brantley played in Southwestern Port St. Lucie Little League Baseball. When Mickey worked as the hitting coach for the New York Mets in 1999, Michael got to spend time around the Mets.

Brantley attended Fort Pierce Central High School in Fort Pierce, Florida, where he played for the baseball and golf teams. In his senior year for the baseball team, he had a .595 batting average, scored 22 runs, and recorded 12 runs batted in and 32 stolen bases. After being drafted by the Milwaukee Brewers out of high school, Brantley gave up his National Letter of Intent to play college baseball for the Coastal Carolina Chanticleers.

== Professional career ==
=== Milwaukee Brewers ===
The Milwaukee Brewers selected Brantley in the seventh round, with the 205th overall selection, of the 2005 MLB draft. After he signed with the Brewers, Brantley played for their Rookie-level affiliates, the Helena Brewers of the Pioneer League and Arizona Brewers of the Arizona League. He batted .347 with 14 stolen bases in 44 games for Arizona, and .324 in 10 games for Helena.

The Brewers assigned Brantley to the West Virginia Power of the Class A South Atlantic League in 2006. He batted .300 with 24 stolen bases in 108 games for West Virginia. In 2007, Brantley began the season with West Virginia. After batting .335 in 56 games, the Brewers promoted Brantley to the Huntsville Stars of the Class AA Southern League, where he batted .251 in 59 games. Playing for Huntsville in 2008, Brantley had a .319 batting average with four home runs, 40 RBIs, and 28 stolen bases.

=== Cleveland Indians ===
The Brewers traded Brantley to the Cleveland Indians on October 3, 2008, as the player to be named later (PTBNL) in the July 7 transaction where the Brewers acquired CC Sabathia for Matt LaPorta, Zach Jackson, and Rob Bryson. The list of choices for the PTBNL was narrowed down to Brantley and Taylor Green. The Indians and Brewers agreed that if the Brewers reached the 2008 MLB postseason, the Indians could make the choice. Since the Brewers made the playoffs, the Indians got to choose, and they chose Brantley.

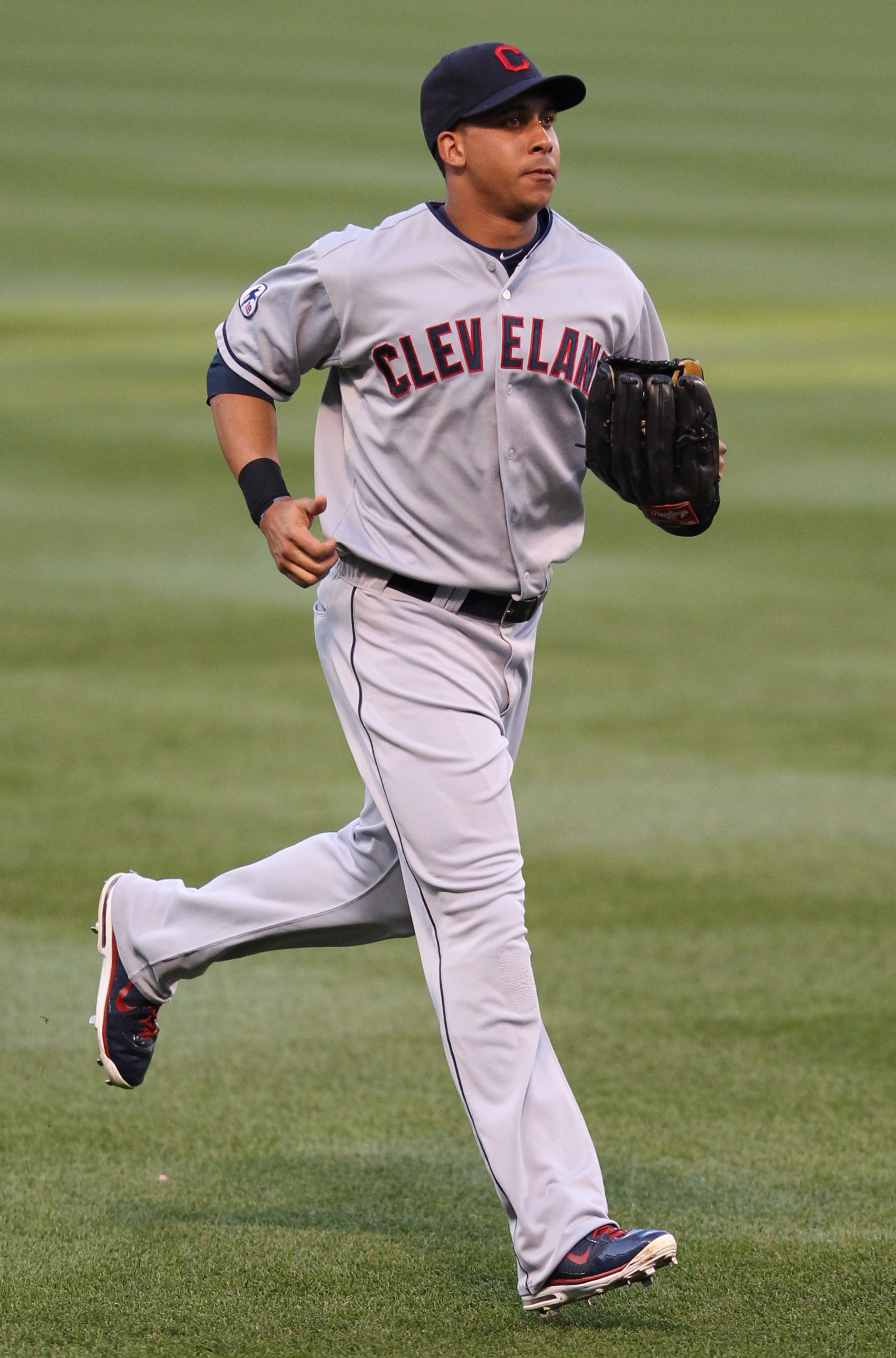
Brantley in 2011

Brantley played for the Columbus Clippers of the Class AAA International League in 2009. He hit .267 for the Clippers. When major league rosters expanded on September 1, the Indians promoted Brantley to the major leagues. Brantley reached base safely in his first eight games. Near the end of the 2009 season, he replaced the injured Grady Sizemore in center field. In his time there, he hit .313 with 11 RBIs in 28 games. Due to an injury to Russell Branyan, Brantley opened the 2010 season with Cleveland, starting in left field on Opening Day. When the Indians activated Branyan on April 19, Brantley, who had batted 5-for-32, was optioned to Columbus. Brantley batted .315 in 59 games for Columbus, and was recalled to the major leagues on July 4 after an injury to Shin-Soo Choo. After batting 11-for-70 with one home run in 26 games in his second stint with the 2010 Indians, he was demoted to Columbus on July 27 to make room for Josh Tomlin. Manager Manny Acta said that Brantley would soon be back in Cleveland, and he was recalled to Cleveland on August 6, as the Indians' leadoff hitter. He batted .292 for the remainder of the season, and finished the season with a .242 batting average.

In 2011, Brantley batted .266 in 114 games. He hit seven home runs, recorded 46 RBIs, and stole 13 bases. After missing time due to tendinitis in his right wrist, Brantley's season ended prematurely when he required surgery on the hamate bone in his right hand in August. In 2012, Brantley shifted to center field to replace the injured Grady Sizemore. He had a career-high 22-game hitting streak. Brantley has a patient approach to the plate that is followed by a short, compact swing. He rarely swings at the first pitch and will only do so if he has guessed the right location and type of pitch. In 2012, he was given the nickname "Dr. Smooth" by Cleveland Indians sports writer Dennis Manoloff for his smooth swing and approach at the plate. In 144 games, he batted .288 with a .348 on-base percentage, .402 slugging percentage, 37 doubles, and 60 RBIs: all setting new career highs.

After the 2012 season, Brantley had surgery to correct a sports hernia. Before the 2013 season, the Indians signed center fielder Michael Bourn as a free agent, and moved Brantley back to left field. The Indians discussed a contract extension with Brantley's representatives, but talks ended when the season began. In August 2013, Brantley set a new Indians' franchise record for games without an error by an outfielder with 213, passing Rocky Colavito. Brantley had a break-through season in 2013, batting .284 with 158 hits, 10 home runs, 73 RBIs, and 17 stolen bases. His errorless streak reached 245 at the end of the season.

Brantley was eligible for salary arbitration before the 2014 season. Rather than going through with arbitration, the Indians signed Brantley to a four-year contract extension worth $25 million, with an option for a fifth season valued at $11 million and a $3.5 million signing bonus. Brantley was selected to appear in the 2014 MLB All-Star Game after hitting .322 with 15 home runs and 63 RBIs during the first half of the season. On the final game of his 2014 season he picked up his 200th hit of the season making him the 18th player in Indians history to do so and first since Kenny Lofton reached the milestone in 1996. He batted .327/.385/.506 with a career-high 20 home runs in 2014. After the season, Brantley won the Silver Slugger Award. He was named a finalist for the 2014 American League Most Valuable Player Award and finished in third place in the balloting, behind winner Mike Trout and Victor Martínez.

In 2015, Brantley batted .310/.379/.480 with 15 home runs, led the majors in doubles (45), and had the lowest strikeout percentage of all major league baseball players (8.6%). He also led the major leagues in walks-per-strikeout at 1.18, and had the highest contact percentage on his swings in the major leagues (92.6%).

Brantley underwent shoulder surgery in the off-season, but returned to the Indians in April. By August, it was clear that a second surgery would be necessary, ending his season. In 2016, in 36 at bats he hit .231/.279/.282/. He did not play in the playoffs for Cleveland's run to the World Series.

On August 9, 2017, Brantley was placed on the 10-day disabled list due to a right ankle strain. In 2017 he batted .299/.357/.444 with 9 home runs. The Indians exercised Brantley's 2018 option on November 3, 2017.

Batting .306 with five home runs and 31 RBIs, Brantley was named to the 2018 MLB All-Star Game. In 2018 he batted .309/.364/.468 with 17 home runs, as he also had the highest contact percentage on his swings in the major leagues (90.9%).

=== Houston Astros ===
==== 2019 ====
On December 17, 2018, Brantley signed a two-year, $32 million contract with the Houston Astros. At Angel Stadium on July 17, 2019, Brantley swatted his 100th career home run, and 13th of the season, during the top of the first inning off Félix Peña. Brantley connected for his third career walk-off home run on September 5, and first as an Astro.

In 2019, Brantley batted .311/.372/.503 with 40 doubles (5th in the AL), 22 home runs, and 90 RBIs in 575 at bats, while grounding into 21 double plays (4th). He ranked fourth in the AL in batting and eighth in hits (179). On defense, he had a 10 Defensive Runs Saved (DRS) rating, the best in the major leagues among left fielders. Brantley struck out swinging for the final out of the World Series, fanned by Daniel Hudson of the Washington Nationals in Game 7.

==== 2020 ====
In 2020, Brantley batted .300/.364/.476 with 24 runs, 15 doubles (9th in the AL), 5 home runs, and 22 RBIs in 170 at bats. He was the DH in 26 games, and played left field in 19 games.

==== 2021 ====
On January 25, 2021, Brantley re-signed with the Astros on a two-year, $32 million contract, similar to the contract he signed in 2018. On April 1, Brantley homered on Opening Day for the third successive campaign. He batted .345 in April and .410 in June, remaining at or near the top of the AL batting leaders for much of the season. On July 4, Brantley was selected to his fifth All-Star Game, batting .326/.372/.475 in the first half of the season. It was his first selection since 2019. A lingering knee injury dampened Brantley's second-half performance. As of late July, he was batting .336. He saw just 39 at bats in September, and his average slipped to .311 at season's end. He finished runner-up to teammate Yuli Gurriel for the AL batting title, marking the sixth time in his career he had finished in the top 10 in the AL in batting. He was also second in the AL with 8.8 at bats per strikeout. Overall, he slashed .311/.362/.437 with eight home runs, 29 doubles, 68 runs scored, and 47 RBIs in 121 games and 508 plate appearances.

Brantley hit safely in all four games of the Division Series games versus the Chicago White Sox to extend a hitting streak to fifteen straight postseason games. It is the longest postseason hitting streak by an Astros player as well as the fifth longest in MLB history. In Game 1 of the ALCS on October 15, he lined a hit in the fifth inning to move the streak to sixteen; the streak ended the next game.

==== 2022 ====
On May 4, 2022, Brantley singled home two runs in the second inning versus the Seattle Mariners, extending a lead to 3–0. He also doubled on the way to a 7–2 win that completed a sweep of the Mariners. In a contest versus the Boston Red Sox on May 17, Brantley's home run in the second inning off starter Nathan Eovaldi was the fourth of five Astros home runs, tying the major league record for home runs by a team in one inning. On June 14, Brantley doubled and reached base three times versus the Texas Rangers, including an eighth-inning single that sparked a rally as Houston won, 4–3. Brantley hit a grand slam on June 17 versus the White Sox, highlighting a ten-run sixth inning, which accounted for Houston's largest output in one frame since May 29, 2017.

On June 27, Brantley was placed on the 10-day injured list due to right shoulder discomfort. On August 12, Brantley underwent right shoulder surgery to repair a torn labrum, which prematurely ended his season. In the midst of another excellent season, he produced a .288 batting average and his .370 on-base percentage ranked second on the team at the time of the surgery. He had been the only American League player to bat at least .300 over each of the previous four seasons.

Although he did not play in the postseason, Brantley traveled with the team for its run to the 2022 World Series. When they lost Game 3, he ordered a players-only meeting to motivate the team to improve their hitting in order to get back into the Series, which they trailed, 2–1. It was later cited as a key motivator for the players as the team won the next three games to deliver a championship, with Brantley earning his first ring.

Following the World Series, Brantley became a free agent.

==== 2023 ====
Brantley agreed to a one-year, $12 million deal to return to the Astros on December 18, 2022. Another $4 million worth of incentives were available based on the number of plate appearances attained. On April 23, 2023, Brantley was sent on a rehab assignment to the Sugar Land Space Cowboys following his shoulder surgery. However, after suffering a setback in his recovery, he was transferred to the 60-day injured list on June 23. Brantley was activated on August 29.

In Game 4 of the American League Division Series (ALDS), Brantley hit a solo home run in the second inning that was instrumental in a 3–2 win versus Minnesota and clinch the series. The Astros advanced to, and extended their American League record, seventh-straight American League Championship Series (ALCS).

Brantley announced his retirement on January 5, 2024.

== Personal life ==
Brantley resides in Port St. Lucie, Florida, during the baseball offseason and is married. His wife, Melissa, gave birth to their first child, a daughter, in September 2013. Their second child, a son, was born in February 2015. Their third child, a son, arrived in June 2017. In retirement, Brantley began his coaching career at the Little League level.

Brantley maintains a close relationship with his father. During Michael's playing career, they spoke every morning by phone to discuss his at bats from the previous game. Brantley's cousin, Justin, was a minor league pitcher in the Indians' organization.

== See also ==
- Cleveland Guardians award winners and league leaders
- List of Major League Baseball annual doubles leaders
- List of Major League Baseball career games played as a left fielder leaders
- List of second-generation Major League Baseball players
