= 2020 Tampa Bay Rays season =

2020 Tampa Bay Rays
- American League champions American League East champions
- League: American League
- Division: East
- Ballpark: Tropicana Field
- City: St. Petersburg, Florida
- Record: 40–20 (.667)
- Divisional place: 1st
- Owners: Stuart Sternberg
- Manager: Kevin Cash
- Television: Fox Sports Sun; Fox Sports Florida (Dewayne Staats, Brian Anderson)
- Radio: Tampa Bay Rays Radio Network (English) (Andy Freed, Dave Wills); WGES (Spanish) (Ricardo Taveras, Enrique Oliu)

The 2020 Tampa Bay Rays season was the 23rd season of the Tampa Bay Rays franchise. The Rays played their home games at Tropicana Field as members of Major League Baseball's American League East.

On March 12, 2020, the start of the regular season would be delayed by at least two weeks in addition to the remainder of spring training being cancelled. Four days later, it was announced that the start of the season would be pushed back indefinitely due to the recommendation made by the Centers for Disease Control and Prevention (CDC) to restrict events of more than 50 people for eight weeks. On June 23, commissioner Rob Manfred unilaterally implemented a 60-game season. Players reported to training camps on July 1 in order to resume spring training and prepare for Opening Day in late July. The revised 60-game schedule was announced on July 6, with the Rays set to have Opening Day on July 26, and the regular season concluding on September 27. The revised Rays schedule was composed of 40 games against AL East opponents and 20 games against NL East opponents.

Due to the pandemic and the shortened season, Major League Baseball instituted certain rule changes which included the use of a universal designated hitter, a runner on second base to start extra innings, and a revised schedule. On July 30, the league and the union agreed that all remaining doubleheaders during the season would be seven innings. On September 17, the Rays clinched a spot in the playoffs for the second straight year. On September 23, the Rays clinched their third American League East championship and their first since 2010. They swept the Toronto Blue Jays in the ALWCS and beat the New York Yankees in the ALDS. The Rays would then go on to defeat the Houston Astros in the ALCS and advanced to the World Series for the first time since 2008. They lost in the World Series to the Los Angeles Dodgers in six games.

== Offseason ==
=== Rule changes ===
For the 2020 season, MLB instituted several new rule changes including the following:

- Single trade deadline – there would no longer be a waiver trade deadline later in the year.
- 26-man roster – rosters expanded from 25 players, but no team may carry more than 13 pitchers.
- Three-batter minimum for pitchers - a pitcher must face three batters in a game before they can be removed unless there is an injury or the end of an inning.

Further rule changes came into effect in response to the COVID-19 pandemic including the addition of the designated hitter in the National League, a shortened schedule, and in extra innings, a runner was placed at second base in each half inning.

== Regular season ==
=== Game log ===
Due to the COVID-19 pandemic, the regular season was shortened to 60 games, with teams playing 10 games against each other member of their division while also playing four games against each team in the corresponding division in the other league. The Rays played 10 games against each team in their division and 20 games between the teams in the National League East Division. On July 6, 2020, MLB announced the Rays' 60-game schedule, which began on July 24 and ended on September 27.

Legend
| | Rays win |
| | Rays loss |
| | Postponement |
| **Bold** | Rays team member |

2020 Game Log: 40–20 (Home: 21–9; Away: 19–11)
July: 4–4 (Home: 4–1; Away: 0–3)

| # | Date | Opponent | Score | Win | Loss | Save | Record | Streak/Recap |
|---|---|---|---|---|---|---|---|---|
| 1 | July 24 | Blue Jays | 4–6 | Romano (1–0) | **Morton** (0–1) | Giles (1) | 0–1 | L1 |
| 2 | July 25 | Blue Jays | 4–1 | **Anderson** (1–0) | Gaviglio (0–1) | **Drake** (1) | 1–1 | W1 |
| 3 | July 26 | Blue Jays | 6–5 (10) | **Roe** (1–0) | Yamaguchi (0–1) | — | 2–1 | W2 |
| 4 | July 27 | Braves | 14–5 | **Castillo** (1–0) | Foltynewicz (0–1) | — | 3–1 | W3 |
| 5 | July 28 | Braves | 5–2 | **Fairbanks** (1–0) | Wright (0–1) | **Drake** (2) | 4–1 | W4 |
| 6 | July 29 | @ Braves | 4–7 | O'Day (1–0) | **Drake** (0–1) | Melancon (1) | 4–2 | L1 |
| 7 | July 30 | @ Braves | 1–2 | Fried (1–0) | **Yarbrough** (0–1) | Melancon (2) | 4–3 | L2 |
| 8 | July 31 | @ Orioles | 3–6 | Fry (1–0) | **Fairbanks** (1–1) | Sulser (2) | 4–4 | L3 |

August: 21–7 (Home: 8–4; Away: 13–3)

| # | Date | Opponent | Score | Win | Loss | Save | Record | Streak/Recap |
|---|---|---|---|---|---|---|---|---|
| 9 | August 1 | @ Orioles | 4–5 (11) | Lakins (1–0) | **Drake** (0–2) | — | 4–5 | L4 |
| 10 | August 2 | @ Orioles | 1–5 | Phillips (1–0) | **Beeks** (0–1) | Sulser (3) | 4–6 | L5 |
| 11 | August 4 | Red Sox | 5–1 | **Morton** (1–1) | Eovaldi (1–1) | **Anderson** (1) | 5–6 | W1 |
| 12 | August 5 | Red Sox | 0–5 | Pérez (2–1) | **Yarbrough** (0–2) | — | 5–7 | L1 |
| 13 | August 7 | Yankees | 1–0 | **Roe** (2–0) | Ottavino (2–1) | — | 6–7 | W1 |
| 14 | August 8 (1) | Yankees | 4–8 (7) | Green (2–0) | **Glasnow** (0–1) | — | 6–8 | L1 |
| 15 | August 8 (2) | Yankees | 5–3 (7) | **Fairbanks** (2–1) | King (0–1) | **Anderson** (2) | 7–8 | W1 |
| 16 | August 9 | Yankees | 4–3 | **Thompson** (1–0) | Britton (0–1) | — | 8–8 | W2 |
| 17 | August 10 | @ Red Sox | 8–7 | **Loup** (1–0) | Springs (0–1) | **Kittredge** (1) | 9–8 | W3 |
| 18 | August 11 | @ Red Sox | 8–2 | **Curtiss** (1–0) | Pérez (2–2) | — | 10–8 | W4 |
| 19 | August 12 | @ Red Sox | 9–5 | **Snell** (1–0) | Godley (0–2) | — | 11–8 | W5 |
| 20 | August 13 | @ Red Sox | 17–8 | **Beeks** (1–1) | Hart (0–1) | **Banda** (1) | 12–8 | W6 |
| 21 | August 14 | @ Blue Jays^{[a]} | 4–12 | Font (1–1) | **Thompson** (1–1) | — | 12–9 | L1 |
| 22 | August 15 | @ Blue Jays^{[a]} | 3–2 | **Loup** (2–0) | Romano (1–1) | **Anderson** (3) | 13–9 | W1 |
| 23 | August 16 | @ Blue Jays^{[a]} | 7–5 (8) | **Loup** (3–0) | Font (1–2) | **Slegers** (1) | 14–9 | W2 |
| 24 | August 18 | @ Yankees | 6–3 | **Snell** (2–0) | Tanaka (0–1) | **Roe** (1) | 15–9 | W3 |
| 25 | August 19 | @ Yankees | 4–2 | **Fairbanks** (3–1) | Britton (0–2) | **Beeks** (1) | 16–9 | W4 |
| 26 | August 20 | @ Yankees | 10–5 | **Castillo** (2–0) | Ottavino (2–2) | — | 17–9 | W5 |
| 27 | August 21 | Blue Jays | 5–6 (10) | Hatch (1–1) | **Loup** (3–1) | Romano (1) | 17–10 | L1 |
| 28 | August 22 | Blue Jays | 2–1 (10) | **Banda** (1–0) | Bass (1–1) | — | 18–10 | W1 |
| 29 | August 23 | Blue Jays | 5–4 | **Fleming** (1–0) | Borucki (1–1) | **Curtiss** (1) | 19–10 | W2 |
| 30 | August 24 | Blue Jays | 4–6 | Hatch (2–1) | **Loup** (3–2) | Romano (2) | 19–11 | L1 |
| 31 | August 25 | Orioles | 4–2 | **Glasnow** (1–1) | Milone (1–4) | **García** (1) | 20–11 | W1 |
| 32 | August 26 | Orioles | 4–3 | **Sherriff** (1–0) | Givens (0–1) | **Castillo** (1) | 21–11 | W2 |
| — | August 27 | Orioles | Postponed (2020 American athlete strikes) Makeup: September 17 | | | | | |
| 33 | August 28 | @ Marlins | 2–0 | **Fairbanks** (4–1) | Bleier (1–1) | **Castillo** (2) | 22–11 | W3 |
| 34 | August 29 | @ Marlins | 4–0 | **Fleming** (2–0) | López (3–2) | — | 23–11 | W4 |
| 35 | August 30 | @ Marlins | 12–7 | **Snell** (3–0) | Alcantara (1–1) | — | 24–11 | W5 |
| 36 | August 31 | @ Yankees | 5–3 | **Glasnow** (2–1) | Cole (4–2) | **Castillo** (3) | 25–11 | W6 |

September: 15–9 (Home: 9–3; Away: 6–6)

| # | Date | Opponent | Score | Win | Loss | Save | Record | Streak/Recap |
|---|---|---|---|---|---|---|---|---|
| 37 | September 1 | @ Yankees | 3–5 | Tanaka (1–1) | **Thompson** (1–2) | Chapman (1) | 25–12 | L1 |
| 38 | September 2 | @ Yankees | 5–2 | **Curtiss** (2–0) | Montgomery (2–2) | — | 26–12 | W1 |
| 39 | September 4 | Marlins | 5–4 | **Fleming** (3–0) | López (3–3) | **Anderson** (4) | 27–12 | W2 |
| 40 | September 5 | Marlins | 3–7 | Alcantara (2–1) | **Snell** (3–1) | Kintzler (9) | 27–13 | L1 |
| 41 | September 6 | Marlins | 5–4 (10) | **Curtiss** (3–0) | Kintzler (1–3) | — | 28–13 | W1 |
| 42 | September 7 | @ Nationals | 1–6 | Scherzer (4–2) | **Morton** (1–2) | Hudson (8) | 28–14 | L1 |
| 43 | September 8 | @ Nationals | 3–5 | Sánchez (2–4) | **Yarbrough** (0–3) | Hudson (9) | 28–15 | L2 |
| 44 | September 10 | Red Sox | 3–4 | Weber (1–2) | **Fairbanks** (4–2) | Barnes (5) | 28–16 | L3 |
| 45 | September 11 | Red Sox | 11–1 | **Snell** (4–1) | Hall (0–3) | — | 29–16 | W1 |
| 46 | September 12 | Red Sox | 5–4 | **Glasnow** (3–1) | Walden (0–2) | **Castillo** (4) | 30–16 | W2 |
| 47 | September 13 | Red Sox | 3–6 | Pérez (3–4) | **Fairbanks** (4–3) | Barnes (6) | 30–17 | L1 |
| 48 | September 15 | Nationals | 6–1 | **Yarbrough** (1–3) | Sánchez (2–5) | **Anderson** (5) | 31–17 | W1 |
| 49 | September 16 | Nationals | 2–4 (10) | Hudson (2–2) | **Anderson** (1–1) | McGowin (1) | 31–18 | L1 |
| 50 | September 17 (1) | @ Orioles | 3–1 (7) | **Castillo** (3–0) | Valdez (1–1) | — | 32–18 | W1 |
| 51 | September 17 (2) | Orioles^{[b]} | 10–6 | **Fairbanks** (5–3) | Sulser (1–5) | — | 33–18 | W2 |
| 52 | September 18 | @ Orioles | 2–1 | **Glasnow** (4–1) | Cobb (1–5) | **Sherriff** (1) | 34–18 | W3 |
| 53 | September 19 | @ Orioles | 3–1 | **Morton** (2–2) | López (2–1) | **Thompson** (1) | 35–18 | W4 |
| 54 | September 20 | @ Orioles | 1–2 | Means (2–3) | **Yarbrough** (1–4) | Valdez (2) | 35–19 | L1 |
| 55 | September 21 | @ Mets | 2–1 | **Fleming** (4–0) | deGrom (4–2) | **Anderson** (6) | 36–19 | W1 |
| 56 | September 22 | @ Mets | 2–5 | Lugo (3–3) | **Snell** (4–2) | Díaz (5) | 36–20 | L1 |
| 57 | September 23 | @ Mets | 8–5 | **Glasnow** (5–1) | Wacha (1–4) | — | 37–20 | W1 |
| 58 | September 25 | Phillies | 6–4 | **Anderson** (2–1) | Morgan (0–1) | **Curtiss** (2) | 38–20 | W2 |
| 59 | September 26 | Phillies | 4–3 | **Fairbanks** (6–3) | Wheeler (4–2) | **Slegers** (1) | 39–20 | W3 |
| 60 | September 27 | Phillies | 5–0 | **Fleming** (5–0) | Nola (5–5) | — | 40–20 | W4 |

Legend: = Win = Loss = Postponement
Bold = Rays team member

- ^{a} Games played at Sahlen Field in Buffalo, New York.
- ^{b} Game played at Oriole Park at Camden Yards with the Rays as the home team.

=== Season standings ===
AL East
| Team | W | L | Pct. | GB | Home | Road |
|---|---|---|---|---|---|---|
| Tampa Bay Rays | 40 | 20 | .667 | — | 20‍–‍9 | 20‍–‍11 |
| New York Yankees | 33 | 27 | .550 | 7 | 22‍–‍9 | 11‍–‍18 |
| Toronto Blue Jays | 32 | 28 | .533 | 8 | 17‍–‍9 | 15‍–‍19 |
| Baltimore Orioles | 25 | 35 | .417 | 15 | 13‍–‍20 | 12‍–‍15 |
| Boston Red Sox | 24 | 36 | .400 | 16 | 11‍–‍20 | 13‍–‍16 |

Division leaders
| Team | W | L | Pct. |
|---|---|---|---|
| Tampa Bay Rays | 40 | 20 | .667 |
| Oakland Athletics | 36 | 24 | .600 |
| Minnesota Twins | 36 | 24 | .600 |

Division 2nd place
| Team | W | L | Pct. |
|---|---|---|---|
| Cleveland Indians | 35 | 25 | .583 |
| New York Yankees | 33 | 27 | .550 |
| Houston Astros | 29 | 31 | .483 |

Wild Card teams (Top 2 teams qualify for postseason)
| Team | W | L | Pct. | GB |
|---|---|---|---|---|
| Chicago White Sox | 35 | 25 | .583 | +3 |
| Toronto Blue Jays | 32 | 28 | .533 | — |
| Seattle Mariners | 27 | 33 | .450 | 5 |
| Los Angeles Angels | 26 | 34 | .433 | 6 |
| Kansas City Royals | 26 | 34 | .433 | 6 |
| Baltimore Orioles | 25 | 35 | .417 | 7 |
| Boston Red Sox | 24 | 36 | .400 | 8 |
| Detroit Tigers | 23 | 35 | .397 | 8 |
| Texas Rangers | 22 | 38 | .367 | 10 |

=== Record vs. opponents ===
2020 American League record Source: MLB Standings Grid – 2020
| Team | **BAL** | **BOS** | **NYY** | **TB** | **TOR** | NL |
| Baltimore | — | 5–5 | 3–7 | 4–6 | 2–8 | 11–9 |
| Boston | 5–5 | — | 1–9 | 3–7 | 5–5 | 10–10 |
| New York | 7–3 | 9–1 | — | 2–8 | 5–5 | 10–10 |
| Tampa Bay | 6–4 | 7–3 | 8–2 | — | 6–4 | 13–7 |
| Toronto | 8–2 | 5–5 | 5–5 | 4–6 | — | 10–10 |

=== Opening Day starters ===
| Name | Pos. |
|---|---|
| Yandy Díaz | 1B |
| Hunter Renfroe | RF |
| Yoshi Tsutsugo | 3B |
| José Martinez | DH |
| Manuel Margot | LF |
| Mike Brosseau | 2B |
| Willy Adames | SS |
| Kevin Kiermaier | CF |
| Mike Zunino | C |
| Charlie Morton | SP |

== Player stats ==
=== Batting ===
Note: G = Games played; AB = At bats; R = Runs; H = Hits; 2B = Doubles; 3B = Triples; HR = Home runs; RBI = Runs batted in; SB = Stolen bases; BB = Walks; AVG = Batting average; SLG = Slugging average

| Player | G | AB | R | H | 2B | 3B | HR | RBI | SB | BB | AVG | SLG |
|---|---|---|---|---|---|---|---|---|---|---|---|---|
| Brandon Lowe | 56 | 193 | 36 | 52 | 9 | 2 | 14 | 37 | 3 | 25 | .269 | .554 |
| Willy Adames | 54 | 185 | 29 | 48 | 15 | 1 | 8 | 23 | 2 | 20 | .259 | .481 |
| Joey Wendle | 50 | 168 | 24 | 48 | 9 | 2 | 4 | 17 | 8 | 10 | .286 | .435 |
| Yoshi Tsutsugo | 51 | 157 | 27 | 31 | 5 | 1 | 8 | 24 | 0 | 26 | .197 | .395 |
| Manuel Margot | 47 | 145 | 19 | 39 | 9 | 0 | 1 | 11 | 12 | 13 | .269 | .352 |
| Kevin Kiermaier | 49 | 138 | 16 | 30 | 5 | 3 | 3 | 22 | 8 | 20 | .217 | .362 |
| Austin Meadows | 36 | 132 | 19 | 27 | 8 | 1 | 4 | 13 | 2 | 17 | .205 | .371 |
| Ji-man Choi | 42 | 122 | 16 | 28 | 13 | 0 | 3 | 16 | 0 | 20 | .230 | .410 |
| Hunter Renfroe | 42 | 122 | 18 | 19 | 5 | 0 | 8 | 22 | 2 | 14 | .156 | .393 |
| Yandy Díaz | 34 | 114 | 16 | 35 | 3 | 0 | 2 | 11 | 0 | 23 | .307 | .386 |
| Mike Brosseau | 36 | 86 | 12 | 26 | 5 | 1 | 5 | 12 | 2 | 8 | .302 | .558 |
| Michael Pérez | 38 | 84 | 7 | 14 | 3 | 0 | 1 | 13 | 0 | 7 | .167 | .238 |
| Mike Zunino | 28 | 75 | 8 | 11 | 4 | 0 | 4 | 10 | 0 | 6 | .147 | .360 |
| José Martínez | 24 | 67 | 10 | 16 | 4 | 0 | 2 | 10 | 0 | 9 | .239 | .388 |
| Nathaniel Lowe | 21 | 67 | 10 | 15 | 2 | 0 | 4 | 11 | 1 | 9 | .224 | .433 |
| Randy Arozarena | 23 | 64 | 15 | 18 | 2 | 0 | 7 | 11 | 4 | 6 | .281 | .641 |
| Kevan Smith | 17 | 31 | 3 | 8 | 3 | 0 | 1 | 8 | 0 | 5 | .258 | .452 |
| Brett Phillips | 17 | 20 | 2 | 3 | 0 | 1 | 1 | 3 | 3 | 5 | .150 | .400 |
| Brian O'Grady | 2 | 5 | 2 | 2 | 1 | 0 | 0 | 0 | 1 | 0 | .400 | .600 |
| Team totals | 60 | 1975 | 289 | 470 | 105 | 12 | 80 | 274 | 48 | 243 | .238 | .425 |

=== Pitching ===
Note: W = Wins; L = Losses; ERA = Earned run average; G = Games pitched; GS = Games started; SV = Saves; IP = Innings pitched; H = Hits allowed; R = Runs allowed; ER = Earned runs allowed; BB = Walks allowed; SO = Strikeouts

| Player | W | L | ERA | G | GS | SV | IP | H | R | ER | BB | SO |
|---|---|---|---|---|---|---|---|---|---|---|---|---|
| Tyler Glasnow | 5 | 1 | 4.08 | 11 | 11 | 0 | 57.1 | 43 | 26 | 26 | 22 | 91 |
| Ryan Yarbrough | 1 | 4 | 3.56 | 11 | 9 | 0 | 55.2 | 54 | 22 | 22 | 12 | 44 |
| Blake Snell | 4 | 2 | 3.24 | 11 | 11 | 0 | 50.0 | 42 | 19 | 18 | 18 | 63 |
| Charlie Morton | 2 | 2 | 4.74 | 9 | 9 | 0 | 38.0 | 43 | 21 | 20 | 10 | 42 |
| Josh Fleming | 5 | 0 | 2.78 | 7 | 5 | 0 | 32.1 | 28 | 10 | 10 | 7 | 25 |
| Trevor Richards | 0 | 0 | 5.91 | 9 | 4 | 0 | 32.0 | 44 | 24 | 21 | 11 | 27 |
| Pete Fairbanks | 6 | 3 | 2.70 | 27 | 2 | 0 | 26.2 | 23 | 9 | 8 | 14 | 39 |
| Ryan Thompson | 1 | 2 | 4.44 | 25 | 1 | 1 | 26.1 | 29 | 15 | 13 | 8 | 23 |
| Aaron Slegers | 0 | 0 | 3.46 | 11 | 1 | 2 | 26.0 | 18 | 10 | 10 | 5 | 19 |
| Aaron Loup | 3 | 2 | 2.52 | 24 | 0 | 0 | 25.0 | 17 | 9 | 7 | 4 | 22 |
| John Curtiss | 3 | 0 | 1.80 | 17 | 3 | 2 | 25.0 | 21 | 7 | 5 | 3 | 25 |
| Diego Castillo | 3 | 0 | 1.66 | 22 | 0 | 4 | 21.2 | 12 | 4 | 4 | 11 | 23 |
| Jalen Beeks | 1 | 1 | 3.26 | 12 | 0 | 1 | 19.1 | 21 | 9 | 7 | 4 | 26 |
| Nick Anderson | 2 | 1 | 0.55 | 19 | 0 | 6 | 16.1 | 5 | 2 | 1 | 3 | 26 |
| Yonny Chirinos | 0 | 0 | 2.38 | 3 | 3 | 0 | 11.1 | 14 | 4 | 3 | 4 | 10 |
| Oliver Drake | 0 | 2 | 5.73 | 11 | 0 | 2 | 11.0 | 7 | 8 | 7 | 6 | 7 |
| Ryan Sherriff | 1 | 0 | 0.00 | 10 | 0 | 1 | 9.2 | 6 | 0 | 0 | 2 | 2 |
| Chaz Roe | 2 | 0 | 2.89 | 10 | 0 | 1 | 9.1 | 10 | 4 | 3 | 3 | 9 |
| José Alvarado | 0 | 0 | 6.00 | 9 | 0 | 0 | 9.0 | 9 | 7 | 6 | 6 | 13 |
| Andrew Kittredge | 0 | 0 | 2.25 | 8 | 1 | 1 | 8.0 | 8 | 2 | 2 | 2 | 3 |
| Anthony Banda | 1 | 0 | 10.29 | 4 | 0 | 1 | 7.0 | 10 | 9 | 8 | 5 | 4 |
| Sean Gilmartin | 0 | 0 | 8.31 | 2 | 0 | 0 | 4.1 | 7 | 4 | 4 | 4 | 5 |
| Édgar García | 0 | 0 | 10.80 | 4 | 0 | 1 | 3.1 | 3 | 4 | 4 | 4 | 1 |
| Cody Reed | 0 | 0 | 0.00 | 2 | 0 | 0 | 2.2 | 1 | 0 | 0 | 0 | 2 |
| Mike Brosseau | 0 | 0 | 0.00 | 1 | 0 | 0 | 0.1 | 0 | 0 | 0 | 0 | 1 |
| Team totals | 40 | 20 | 3.56 | 60 | 60 | 23 | 527.2 | 475 | 229 | 209 | 168 | 552 |

== Postseason ==
Both games of the Wild Card Series were held at Tropicana Field, by virtue of the Rays being the higher-seeded team. In all succeeding rounds, all games were played at neutral-site ballparks in order to isolate the players during the pandemic. Each game of the Division Series and the American League Championship Series was played at Petco Park in San Diego, California. World Series games were played at Globe Life Field in Arlington, Texas, and were open for roughly 11,500 fans to attend.

2020 Postseason Game Log
American League Wild Card Series

| # | Date | Opponent | Score | Win | Loss | Save | Location | Series |
|---|---|---|---|---|---|---|---|---|
| 1 | September 29 | Blue Jays | 3–1 | Snell (1–0) | Ray (0–1) | Fairbanks (1) | Tropicana Field | 1–0 |
| 2 | September 30 | Blue Jays | 8–2 | Glasnow (1–0) | Ryu (0–1) | — | Tropicana Field | 2–0 |

American League Division Series

| # | Date | Opponent | Score | Win | Loss | Save | Location | Series |
|---|---|---|---|---|---|---|---|---|
| 1 | October 5 | Yankees | 3–9 | Cole (1–0) | Snell (0–1) | — | Petco Park | 0–1 |
| 2 | October 6 | Yankees | 7–5 | Glasnow (1–0) | Happ (0–1) | Fairbanks (1) | Petco Park | 1–1 |
| 3 | October 7 | @ Yankees | 8–4 | Morton (1–0) | Tanaka (0–1) | — | Petco Park | 2–1 |
| 4 | October 8 | @ Yankees | 1–5 | Green (1–0) | Thompson (0–1) | Chapman (1) | Petco Park | 2–2 |
| 5 | October 9 | Yankees | 2–1 | Castillo (1–0) | Chapman (0–1) | — | Petco Park | 3–2 |

American League Championship Series

| # | Date | Opponent | Score | Win | Loss | Save | Location | Series |
|---|---|---|---|---|---|---|---|---|
| 1 | October 11 | Astros | 2–1 | Snell (1–0) | Valdez (0–1) | Castillo (1) | Petco Park | 1–0 |
| 2 | October 12 | Astros | 4–2 | Morton (1–0) | McCullers Jr. (0–1) | Anderson (1) | Petco Park | 2–0 |
| 3 | October 13 | @ Astros | 5–2 | Yarbrough (1–0) | Urquidy (0–1) | Castillo (2) | Petco Park | 3–0 |
| 4 | October 14 | @ Astros | 3–4 | Greinke (1–0) | Glasnow (0–1) | Pressly (1) | Petco Park | 3–1 |
| 5 | October 15 | @ Astros | 3–4 | Pressly (1–0) | Anderson (0–1) | — | Petco Park | 3–2 |
| 6 | October 16 | Astros | 4–7 | Valdez (1–1) | Snell (1–1) | Pressly (2) | Petco Park | 3–3 |
| 7 | October 17 | Astros | 4–2 | Morton (2–0) | McCullers Jr. (0–2) | Fairbanks (1) | Petco Park | 4–3 |

World Series

| # | Date | Opponent | Score | Win | Loss | Save | Location Attendance | Series |
|---|---|---|---|---|---|---|---|---|
| 1 | October 20 | @ Dodgers | 3–8 | Kershaw (1–0) | Glasnow (0–1) | — | Globe Life Field; 11,388 | 0–1 |
| 2 | October 21 | @ Dodgers | 6–4 | Anderson (1–0) | Gonsolin (0–1) | Castillo (1) | Globe Life Field; 11,472 | 1–1 |
| 3 | October 23 | Dodgers | 2–6 | Buehler (1–0) | Morton (0–1) | — | Globe Life Field; 11,447 | 1–2 |
| 4 | October 24 | Dodgers | 8–7 | Curtiss (1–0) | Jansen (1–1) | — | Globe Life Field; 11,441 | 2–2 |
| 5 | October 25 | Dodgers | 2–4 | Kershaw (2–0) | Glasnow (0–2) | Treinen (1) | Globe Life Field; 11,437 | 2–3 |
| 6 | October 27 | @ Dodgers | 1–3 | González (1–0) | Anderson (1–1) | Urías (1) | Globe Life Field; 11,437 | 2–4 |

=== Postseason rosters ===
Playoff rosters
American League Wild Card Series

- Pitchers: 4 Blake Snell 15 Aaron Loup 20 Tyler Glasnow 29 Pete Fairbanks 47 Oliver Drake 48 Ryan Yarbrough 50 Charlie Morton 57 Aaron Slegers 62 Shane McClanahan 63 Diego Castillo 70 Nick Anderson 81 Ryan Thompson 84 John Curtiss
- Catchers: 7 Michael Pérez 10 Mike Zunino
- Infielders: 1 Willy Adames 2 Yandy Díaz 8 Brandon Lowe 18 Joey Wendle 26 Ji-man Choi 35 Nate Lowe 43 Mike Brosseau
- Outfielders: 11 Hunter Renfroe 13 Manuel Margot 14 Brett Phillips 25 Yoshi Tsutsugo 39 Kevin Kiermaier 56 Randy Arozarena

American League Division Series

- Pitchers: 4 Blake Snell 15 Aaron Loup 20 Tyler Glasnow 29 Pete Fairbanks 34 Trevor Richards (Games 4–5) 47 Oliver Drake (Games 1–3) 48 Ryan Yarbrough 50 Charlie Morton 57 Aaron Slegers 62 Shane McClanahan 63 Diego Castillo 70 Nick Anderson 81 Ryan Thompson 84 John Curtiss
- Catchers: 7 Michael Pérez 10 Mike Zunino
- Infielders: 1 Willy Adames 2 Yandy Díaz 8 Brandon Lowe 18 Joey Wendle 26 Ji-man Choi 43 Mike Brosseau
- Outfielders: 11 Hunter Renfroe 13 Manuel Margot 14 Brett Phillips 17 Austin Meadows 25 Yoshi Tsutsugo 39 Kevin Kiermaier 56 Randy Arozarena

American League Championship Series

- Pitchers: 4 Blake Snell 15 Aaron Loup 20 Tyler Glasnow 29 Pete Fairbanks 46 José Alvarado 48 Ryan Yarbrough 50 Charlie Morton 57 Aaron Slegers 61 Josh Fleming 62 Shane McClanahan 63 Diego Castillo 70 Nick Anderson 81 Ryan Thompson 84 John Curtiss
- Catchers: 7 Michael Pérez 10 Mike Zunino
- Infielders: 1 Willy Adames 2 Yandy Díaz 8 Brandon Lowe 18 Joey Wendle 26 Ji-man Choi 43 Mike Brosseau
- Outfielders: 11 Hunter Renfroe 13 Manuel Margot 17 Austin Meadows 25 Yoshi Tsutsugo 39 Kevin Kiermaier 56 Randy Arozarena

World Series

- Pitchers: 4 Blake Snell 15 Aaron Loup 20 Tyler Glasnow 29 Pete Fairbanks 48 Ryan Yarbrough 50 Charlie Morton 61 Josh Fleming 62 Shane McClanahan 63 Diego Castillo 70 Nick Anderson 71 Ryan Sherriff 81 Ryan Thompson 84 John Curtiss
- Catchers: 7 Michael Pérez 10 Mike Zunino
- Infielders: 1 Willy Adames 2 Yandy Díaz 8 Brandon Lowe 18 Joey Wendle 26 Ji-man Choi 43 Mike Brosseau
- Outfielders: 11 Hunter Renfroe 13 Manuel Margot 14 Brett Phillips 17 Austin Meadows 25 Yoshi Tsutsugo 39 Kevin Kiermaier 56 Randy Arozarena

== Roster ==
2020 Tampa Bay Rays
Roster
| Pitchers: 46 José Alvarado; 70 Nick Anderson; 53 Anthony Banda; 68 Jalen Beeks; 63 Diego Castillo; 72 Yonny Chirinos; 84 John Curtiss; 47 Oliver Drake; 29 Peter Fairbanks; 61 Josh Fleming; 58 Édgar García; 85 Sean Gilmartin; 20 Tyler Glasnow; 36 Andrew Kittredge; 15 Aaron Loup; 62 Shane McClanahan; 50 Charlie Morton; 21 Cody Reed; 34 Trevor Richards; 52 Chaz Roe; 71 Ryan Sherriff; 57 Aaron Slegers; 4 Blake Snell; 81 Ryan Thompson; 48 Ryan Yarbrough | Catchers: 7 Michael Pérez; 44 Kevan Smith; 10 Mike Zunino; Infielders: 1 Willy Adames; 43 Mike Brosseau; 26 Ji-man Choi; 2 Yandy Díaz; 8 Brandon Lowe; 35 Nate Lowe; 40 José Martínez; 18 Joey Wendle | Outfielders: 56 Randy Arozarena; 39 Kevin Kiermaier; 13 Manuel Margot; 17 Austin Meadows; 31 Brian O'Grady; 14 Brett Phillips; 11 Hunter Renfroe; 25 Yoshi Tsutsugo | Manager: 16 Kevin Cash; Coaches: 41 Stan Boroski (bullpen); 99 Misha Dworken (bullpen catcher); 97 Jonathan Erlichman (analytics coach); 24 Paul Hoover (field coordinator); 27 Rodney Linares (third base); 51 Chad Mottola (hitting); 33 Matt Quatraro (bench); 98 Jean Ramirez (bullpen catcher); 23 Kyle Snyder (pitching); 30 Ozzie Timmons (first base) |

== Farm system ==
| Level | Team | League | Manager |
|---|---|---|---|
| AAA | Durham Bulls | International League | |
| AA | Montgomery Biscuits | Southern League | |
| A-Advanced | Charlotte Stone Crabs | Florida State League | |
| A | Bowling Green Hot Rods | Midwest League | |
| A-Short Season | Hudson Valley Renegades | New York–Penn League | |
| Rookie Advanced | Princeton Rays | Appalachian League | |
| Rookie | GCL Rays | Gulf Coast League | |
| Foreign Rookie | DSL Rays 1 | Dominican Summer League | |
| Foreign Rookie | DSL Rays 2 | Dominican Summer League | |
