= 2020 Major League Baseball postseason =

2020 Major League Baseball playoffs

Tournament details
- Dates: September 29 – October 27, 2020
- Teams: 16
- Defending champions: Washington Nationals

Final positions
- Champions: Los Angeles Dodgers (7th title)
- Runners-up: Tampa Bay Rays

Tournament statistics
- Most HRs: Randy Arozarena (TB) (10)
- Most SBs: Mookie Betts (LAD) (6)
- Most Ks (as pitcher): Tyler Glasnow (TB) (40)

Awards
- MVP: Corey Seager (LAD)

The 2020 Major League Baseball postseason was the playoff tournament of Major League Baseball for the 2020 season. Due to the COVID-19 pandemic, the league played only a 60-game season, and an expanded 16-team postseason tournament began on September 29, with games of all but the first round being played at neutral sites. A new best-of-three Wild Card series was added as the opening round of this postseason due to the shortened season caused by the pandemic; it would become a permanent addition to the postseason format starting in 2022.

In the American League, the Tampa Bay Rays made their second consecutive appearance, the New York Yankees and Houston Astros made their fourth consecutive appearance, and the Cleveland Indians made their fifth appearance in the last eight seasons. Also appearing in the AL side were the Oakland Athletics, who made their third consecutive appearance, and it would be their last during their time in Oakland as the team would relocate to Las Vegas. The Chicago White Sox returned for the first time since 2008, the Minnesota Twins made their third appearance in the past five seasons, and the Toronto Blue Jays returned for the third time in six seasons.

In the National League, the Los Angeles Dodgers made their eighth consecutive appearance, the Atlanta Braves made their third straight appearance, the San Diego Padres made their first appearance since 2006, the Milwaukee Brewers made their third consecutive appearance, and the St. Louis Cardinals made their third appearance in the past six seasons. Also on the NL side were the now-Miami Marlins, who ended nearly two decades of futility by clinching their first postseason appearance since 2003, ending what was the second longest postseason appearance drought in the majors. The Chicago Cubs returned for the fifth time in the past six seasons, marking the first time since 2008 that both teams from Chicago made the postseason. Last but not least were the Cincinnati Reds, who returned to the postseason for the first time since 2013, marking the first time since then that both teams from Ohio made the postseason.

The postseason began on September 29, and ended on October 27. The World Series began on October 20 at Globe Life Field in Arlington, and ended on October 27, with the Los Angeles Dodgers defeating the Tampa Bay Rays in six games to win their first title since 1988. It was the Dodgers' seventh title in franchise history.

== Playoff seeds ==
American League Teams National League Teams

The following teams qualified for the postseason:

=== American League ===
1. Tampa Bay Rays – 40–20, AL East champions
2. Oakland Athletics – 36–24, AL West champions (26–14 record vs. AL West)
3. Minnesota Twins – 36–24, AL Central champions (23–17 record vs. AL Central)
4. Cleveland Indians – 35–25 (8–2 head-to-head record vs. CHI)
5. New York Yankees – 33–27
6. Houston Astros – 29–31
7. Chicago White Sox – 35–25 (2–8 head-to-head record vs. CLE)
8. Toronto Blue Jays – 32–28

=== National League ===
1. Los Angeles Dodgers – 43–17, NL West champions
2. Atlanta Braves – 35–25, NL East champions
3. Chicago Cubs – 34–26, NL Central champions
4. San Diego Padres – 37–23
5. St. Louis Cardinals – 30–28
6. Miami Marlins – 31–29
7. Cincinnati Reds – 31–29
8. Milwaukee Brewers – 29–31 (19–21 record vs. NL Central)

== Playoff bracket ==
Wild Card Series (ALWCS, NLWCS)	Division Series (ALDS, NLDS)
1	Tampa Bay	2
8	Toronto	0
1	Tampa Bay	3
5	NY Yankees	2
4	Cleveland	0
5	NY Yankees	2
American League
3	Minnesota	0
6	Houston	2
6	Houston	3
2	Oakland	1
2	Oakland	2
7	Chicago White Sox	1
1	LA Dodgers	2
8	Milwaukee	0
1	LA Dodgers	3
4	San Diego	0
4	San Diego	2
5	St. Louis	1
National League
3	Chicago Cubs	0
6	Miami	2
6	Miami	0
2	Atlanta	3
2	Atlanta	2
7	Cincinnati	0

League Championship Series (ALCS, NLCS)
1	Tampa Bay	4
6	Houston	3
1	LA Dodgers	4
2	Atlanta	3

World Series
AL1	Tampa Bay	2
NL1	LA Dodgers	4

== American League Wild Card ==
=== (1) Tampa Bay Rays vs. (8) Toronto Blue Jays ===
Tampa Bay won the series, 2–0.

Game	Date	Score	Location	Time	Attendance
1	September 29	Toronto Blue Jays – 1, Tampa Bay Rays – 3	Tropicana Field	3:06	N/A
2	September 30	Toronto Blue Jays – 2, Tampa Bay Rays – 8	Tropicana Field	3:05	N/A

The Rays swept the Blue Jays to advance to the ALDS for the second straight year.

Blake Snell pitched six solid innings as the Rays took Game 1. In Game 2, Mike Zunino and Hunter Renfroe both homered for the Rays as they blew out the Blue Jays to complete the sweep.

This was the first of three straight losses in the Wild Card round for Toronto. In 2022 they were swept by the Seattle Mariners, and in 2023 they would get swept by the Minnesota Twins, which was Minnesota’s first playoff series win since 2002.

=== (2) Oakland Athletics vs. (7) Chicago White Sox ===
Oakland won the series, 2–1.

Game	Date	Score	Location	Time	Attendance
1	September 29	Chicago White Sox – 4, Oakland Athletics – 1	Oakland–Alameda County Coliseum	2:53	N/A
2	September 30	Chicago White Sox – 3, Oakland Athletics – 5	Oakland–Alameda County Coliseum	3:05	N/A
3	October 1	Chicago White Sox – 4, Oakland Athletics – 6	Oakland–Alameda County Coliseum	4:09	N/A

The Athletics defeated the White Sox to advance to the ALDS for the first time since 2013.

Lucas Giolito pitched seven solid innings as the White Sox took Game 1 in Oakland. In Game 2, home runs from Marcus Semien and Khris Davis would propel the Athletics to victory. In Game 3, the White Sox jumped out to an early 3–0 lead, but the Athletics went on a 6–1 run across the fourth and fifth innings to close out the series and advance. Game 3 was the last postseason game ever played at the Oakland–Alameda County Coliseum.

This was the first playoff series win by the Athletics since 2006, and their last during their time in Oakland, as the team would relocate to Las Vegas.

=== (3) Minnesota Twins vs. (6) Houston Astros ===
Houston won the series, 2–0.

Game	Date	Score	Location	Time	Attendance
1	September 29	Houston Astros – 4, Minnesota Twins – 1	Target Field	3:49	N/A
2	September 30	Houston Astros – 3, Minnesota Twins – 1	Target Field	3:32	N/A

This was the first postseason meeting between the Astros and Twins. The Astros swept the Twins to advance to the ALDS for the fifth time in six years.

Zack Greinke and Framber Valdez kept the Twins offense at bay in Game 1. Game 2 remained tied until the top of the seventh when Carlos Correa hit a go-ahead solo home run to put the Astros in the lead for good.

With the series loss, the Twins' playoff game losing streak had been extended to eighteen games. Both teams would meet again in the ALDS in 2023, which the Astros also won.

=== (4) Cleveland Indians vs. (5) New York Yankees ===
New York won the series, 2–0.

Game	Date	Score	Location	Time	Attendance
1	September 29	New York Yankees – 12, Cleveland Indians – 3	Progressive Field	3:17	N/A
2	September 30	New York Yankees – 10, Cleveland Indians – 9	Progressive Field	4:50	N/A

This was the fifth postseason meeting between the Yankees and Indians. The Yankees swept the Indians to advance to the ALDS for the fourth year in a row.

The Yankees blew out the Indians in Game 1 as Aaron Judge, Gleyber Torres, Giancarlo Stanton, and Brett Gardner all homered for New York. Game 2 was an offensive shootout between both teams, which would be won by the Yankees 10–9 as they completed a sweep.

Both teams would meet again in the ALDS in 2022, and the ALCS in 2024, with both being won by the Yankees in five games.

== National League Wild Card ==
=== (1) Los Angeles Dodgers vs. (8) Milwaukee Brewers ===
Los Angeles won the series, 2–0.

Game	Date	Score	Location	Time	Attendance
1	September 30	Milwaukee Brewers – 2, Los Angeles Dodgers – 4	Dodger Stadium	3:17	N/A
2	October 1	Milwaukee Brewers – 0, Los Angeles Dodgers – 3	Dodger Stadium	2:55	N/A

This was the second postseason meeting between the Dodgers and Brewers. The first was the NLCS in 2018, which Los Angeles won in seven games before falling in the World Series. The Dodgers swept the Brewers to advance to the NLDS for the eighth year in a row.

In Game 1, the Dodgers jumped out to an early 3–0 lead, but it was narrowed to one thanks to a two-run blast from Orlando Arcia. However, Corey Seager would extend the Dodgers’ lead to two in the bottom of the seventh, which was good enough to secure the victory. Clayton Kershaw and Brusdar Graterol would silence the Milwaukee offense in Game 2 as the Dodgers won 3–0 to close out the series.

Both teams would meet again in the NLCS in 2025, which the Dodgers also won in a sweep en route to repeating as World Series champions, as well as in 2026, which the Brewers won in a sweep en route to a World Series title.

=== (2) Atlanta Braves vs. (7) Cincinnati Reds ===
Atlanta won the series, 2–0.

Game	Date	Score	Location	Time	Attendance
1	September 30	Cincinnati Reds – 0, Atlanta Braves – 1 (13)	Truist Park	4:39	N/A
2	October 1	Cincinnati Reds – 0, Atlanta Braves – 5	Truist Park	3:03	N/A

This was the second postseason meeting between the Reds and Braves. They last met in the NLCS in 1995, which the Braves won in a four-game sweep en route to a World Series title. The Braves once again swept the Reds to advance to the NLDS for the third year in a row.

Game 1 was a long scoreless affair that went into extra innings, where Freddie Freeman won the game for the Braves in the bottom of the thirteenth with an RBI single. Ian Anderson pitched six solid innings in Game 2 as the Braves blanked the Reds 5–0 to close out the series and advance. This was the first playoff series won by the Braves since 2001.

=== (3) Chicago Cubs vs. (6) Miami Marlins ===
Miami won the series, 2–0.

Game	Date	Score	Location	Time	Attendance
1	September 30	Miami Marlins – 5, Chicago Cubs – 1	Wrigley Field	3:22	N/A
2	October 2	Miami Marlins – 2, Chicago Cubs – 0	Wrigley Field	3:22	N/A

This was the second postseason meeting between the Marlins and Cubs. The first was in a highly controversial NLCS in 2003, which the Marlins won in seven games en route to a World Series title as a result of the Cubs’ collapse after the Steve Bartman incident. The Marlins swept the Cubs to return to the NLDS for the first time since 2003.

Sandy Alcántara pitched six solid innings and Corey Dickerson and Jesús Aguilar homered for the Marlins as they won 5–1 in Game 1. Game 2 was a pitchers’ duel between both teams’ bullpens, which was broken in the top of the seventh when Garrett Cooper hit a home run off Yu Darvish to put the Marlins ahead for good.

This was the first playoff series win by the Marlins since the 2003 World Series.

=== (4) San Diego Padres vs. (5) St. Louis Cardinals ===
San Diego won the series, 2–1.

Game	Date	Score	Location	Time	Attendance
1	September 30	St. Louis Cardinals – 7, San Diego Padres – 4	Petco Park	3:53	N/A
2	October 1	St. Louis Cardinals – 9, San Diego Padres – 11	Petco Park	4:19	N/A
3	October 2	St. Louis Cardinals – 0, San Diego Padres – 4	Petco Park	3:21	N/A

This was the fourth postseason meeting between the Padres and Cardinals (1996, 2005, 2006). The Cardinals won all three previous meetings. This time, the Padres returned the favor, defeating the Cardinals in three games to advance to the NLDS for the first time since 2006.

Game 1 was an offensive slugfest that was won by the Cardinals. Game 2 was yet another showdown between both teams’ offenses, which was won by the Padres as Manny Machado, Wil Myers, and Fernando Tatís Jr. all homered for the Padres. In Game 3, the Padres gambled by going with a “bullpen game” strategy in which they used different pitchers every inning. This risk paid off for the Padres as they silenced the Cardinals’ bats in a shutout victory to advance, exacting long-awaited revenge on the team that eliminated them from the postseason in three of their last four postseason appearances. This was the Padres’ first playoff victory since winning the National League pennant in 1998.

This was the first of three straight losses in the Wild Card round for the Cardinals, as they would lose to their rival Los Angeles Dodgers the next year, and they would lose to the eventual National League champion Philadelphia Phillies in 2022.

== American League Division Series ==
=== (1) Tampa Bay Rays vs. (5) New York Yankees ===
Tampa Bay won the series, 3–2.

Game	Date	Score	Location	Time	Attendance
1	October 5	New York Yankees – 9, Tampa Bay Rays – 3	Petco Park	3:38	N/A
2	October 6	New York Yankees – 5, Tampa Bay Rays – 7	Petco Park	3:43	N/A
3	October 7	Tampa Bay Rays – 8, New York Yankees – 4	Petco Park	3:32	N/A
4	October 8	Tampa Bay Rays – 1, New York Yankees – 5	Petco Park	3:14	N/A
5	October 9	New York Yankees – 1, Tampa Bay Rays – 2	Petco Park	3:21	N/A

This was the first postseason meeting between the Rays and Yankees. The Rays defeated the Yankees in five games to advance to the ALCS for the first time since 2008.

The Yankees blew out the Rays in Game 1 as Aaron Judge, Giancarlo Stanton, Clint Frazier, and Kyle Higashioka all homered for New York. Game 2 was an offensive shootout between both teams, which was won by the Rays as Austin Meadows, Mike Zunino, Manuel Margot, and Randy Arozarena all hit home runs. In Game 3, Arozarena homered again along with Michael Pérez and Kevin Kiermaier as the Rays won 8–4 to take the series lead. The Yankees struck back in Game 4 to even the series as Gleyber Torres and Luke Voit both hit home runs to contribute to a 5–1 victory. In Game 5, the Yankees struck first with a solo home run from Judge, but the Rays put up two unanswered runs thanks to home runs from Meadows and Mike Brosseau, and would hold on to win and advance to the ALCS.

=== (2) Oakland Athletics vs. (6) Houston Astros ===
Houston won the series, 3–1.

Game	Date	Score	Location	Time	Attendance
1	October 5	Houston Astros – 10, Oakland Athletics – 5	Dodger Stadium	3:30	N/A
2	October 6	Houston Astros – 5, Oakland Athletics – 2	Dodger Stadium	2:54	N/A
3	October 7	Oakland Athletics – 9, Houston Astros – 7	Dodger Stadium	3:36	N/A
4	October 8	Oakland Athletics – 6, Houston Astros – 11	Dodger Stadium	3:43	N/A

The Astros upset the Athletics in four games to advance to the ALCS for the fourth year in a row.

The Astros blew out the Athletics as they rallied from an early 3–0 deficit to win Game 1. In Game 2, George Springer and Martín Maldonado chased Oakland’s Sean Manaea from the mound as they won 5–1 to take a 2–0 series lead. In Game 3, five different players - Tommy La Stella, Mark Canha, Matt Olson, Marcus Semien, and Chad Pinder, all homered as the Athletics prevailed in an offensive shootout. Game 3 would be the last playoff game ever won by the Athletics during their time in Oakland. Game 4 would be won by the Astros’ offense as Carlos Correa, Michael Brantley, and Jose Altuve all homered for Houston in an 11–6 victory.

This was the last postseason appearance the Athletics made during their time in Oakland, as the team would relocate to Las Vegas.

== National League Division Series ==
=== (1) Los Angeles Dodgers vs. (4) San Diego Padres ===
Los Angeles won the series, 3–0.

Game	Date	Score	Location	Time	Attendance
1	October 6	San Diego Padres – 1, Los Angeles Dodgers – 5	Globe Life Field	3:54	N/A
2	October 7	San Diego Padres – 5, Los Angeles Dodgers – 6	Globe Life Field	3:18	N/A
3	October 8	Los Angeles Dodgers – 12, San Diego Padres – 3	Globe Life Field	4:04	N/A

This was the first postseason series to feature two teams from the same state since the 2002 World Series.

This was the first postseason meeting in the history of the Dodgers–Padres rivalry, also known as the I-5 Rivalry. The Dodgers swept the Padres to advance to the NLCS for the seventh time in the past twelve years.

In Game 1, the Padres once again used the “bullpen game” strategy in which they used different pitchers every inning, but it wouldn’t work this time as the Dodgers easily won. Clayton Kershaw pitched six solid innings as the Dodgers took Game 2 to take a 2–0 series lead. The Dodgers blew out the Padres in Game 3 to close out the series.

Both teams would meet again in the NLDS in 2022, where the 89-win Padres upset the 111-win Dodgers in the biggest postseason upset in over a century. They would also meet in the NLDS in 2024, which the Dodgers won in five games en route to a World Series title.

=== (2) Atlanta Braves vs. (6) Miami Marlins ===
Atlanta won the series, 3–0.

Game	Date	Score	Location	Time	Attendance
1	October 6	Miami Marlins – 5, Atlanta Braves – 9	Minute Maid Park	3:15	N/A
2	October 7	Miami Marlins – 0, Atlanta Braves – 2	Minute Maid Park	2:51	N/A
3	October 8	Atlanta Braves – 7, Miami Marlins – 0	Minute Maid Park	3:29	N/A

This was the second postseason meeting between the Braves and Marlins. They last met in the NLCS in 1997, which was won by the Marlins en route to a World Series title. The Braves swept the Marlins to advance to the NLCS for the first time since 2001.

Ronald Acuña Jr., Travis d'Arnaud, and Dansby Swanson all homered for the Braves as they took Game 1. In Game 2, Swanson and d'Arnaud homered again, and Ian Anderson and the Braves bullpen blanked the Marlins as they took a 2–0 series lead. Kyle Wright pitched six innings of shutout baseball in Game 3 as the Braves blew out the Marlins to complete the sweep.

This was the first playoff series loss by the Marlins in franchise history, previously they had gone undefeated through the postseason field in 1997 and 2003.

== American League Championship Series ==
=== (1) Tampa Bay Rays vs. (6) Houston Astros ===
Tampa Bay won the series, 4–3.

Game	Date	Score	Location	Time	Attendance
1	October 11	Houston Astros – 1, Tampa Bay Rays – 2	Petco Park	3:50	N/A
2	October 12	Houston Astros – 2, Tampa Bay Rays – 4	Petco Park	3:01	N/A
3	October 13	Tampa Bay Rays – 5, Houston Astros – 2	Petco Park	3:59	N/A
4	October 14	Tampa Bay Rays – 3, Houston Astros – 4	Petco Park	3:08	N/A
5	October 15	Tampa Bay Rays – 3, Houston Astros – 4	Petco Park	3:36	N/A
6	October 16	Houston Astros – 7, Tampa Bay Rays – 4	Petco Park	4:01	N/A
7	October 17	Houston Astros – 2, Tampa Bay Rays – 4	Petco Park	3:14	N/A

This was the second postseason meeting between the Rays and Astros. They last met in the ALDS the previous year, which the Astros won in five games before falling in the World Series. The Astros became the second team in MLB history to overcome a 3–0 series deficit to force a Game 7 in a postseason series, the first team to do so since the Boston Red Sox in the 2004 ALCS. However, the Rays managed to hold on and win Game 7, knocking off the defending American League champions to advance to the World Series for the first time since 2008.

Blake Snell pitched five solid innings as the Rays took Game 1 narrowly. Former Astro Charlie Morton outdueled his old teammate in Lance McCullers Jr. in a pitcher’s duel in Game 2 as the Rays took a 2–0 series lead. In Game 3, the Astros took an early lead, but it was erased by a 5–1 run by the Rays in the sixth inning as they took a commanding three games to none series lead. However, the Rays weren’t out of the woods just yet. Jose Altuve and George Springer both homered in a 4–3 Astros win in Game 4. Springer and Carlos Correa homered for the Astros in an identical 4-3 victory in Game 5. The Astros pitching overwhelmed Snell in Game 6 as they managed to force a seventh game. However, the Astros wouldn’t make history as the Rays jumped out to a 4–0 lead thanks to home runs from Mike Zunino and Randy Arozarena and maintained it to win 4–2 and clinch the pennant, surviving a scare.

The Astros would win the pennant the next year over the Boston Red Sox in six games before falling in the World Series.

The Rays would win their next pennant in 2026 over the now-Cleveland Guardians in six games before falling in the World Series.

== National League Championship Series ==
=== (1) Los Angeles Dodgers vs. (2) Atlanta Braves ===
Los Angeles won the series, 4–3.

Game	Date	Score	Location	Time	Attendance
1	October 12	Atlanta Braves – 5, Los Angeles Dodgers – 1	Globe Life Field	3:22	10,700
2	October 13	Atlanta Braves – 8, Los Angeles Dodgers – 7	Globe Life Field	4:12	10,624
3	October 14	Los Angeles Dodgers – 15, Atlanta Braves – 3	Globe Life Field	4:15	10,664
4	October 15	Los Angeles Dodgers – 2, Atlanta Braves – 10	Globe Life Field	3:43	11,044
5	October 16	Los Angeles Dodgers – 7, Atlanta Braves – 3	Globe Life Field	3:45	11,119
6	October 17	Atlanta Braves – 1, Los Angeles Dodgers – 3	Globe Life Field	3:20	10,772
7	October 18	Atlanta Braves – 3, Los Angeles Dodgers – 4	Globe Life Field	3:37	10,920

This was the fourth postseason meeting between the Braves and Dodgers (1996, 2013, 2018), and their first postseason meeting outside of the NLDS. The Dodgers overcame a 3–1 series deficit to defeat the Braves in seven games, returning to the World Series for the third time in the past four years.

Freddie Freeman, Austin Riley, and Ozzie Albies all homered for the Braves as they took Game 1. Game 2 was a shootout between both teams’ offenses, which was won by the Braves as Freeman and Albies hit more home runs. In Game 3, the Dodgers blew out the Braves by twelve runs as five players - Joc Pederson, Max Muncy (who hit a grand slam), Edwin Ríos, Corey Seager, and Cody Bellinger - all hit home runs. The Dodgers’ twelve run margin of victory was the third largest in a LCS game, surpassing their eleven-run margin of victory in Game 4 of the 1974 NLCS. The Braves responded with a blowout victory of their own in Game 4, as the Atlanta offense chased Clayton Kershaw from the mound. However, their lead wouldn’t hold. The Dodgers held on to win in Game 5 to stay alive in the series. Walker Buehler pitched six solid innings and Kenley Jansen got the save as the Dodgers narrowly won to force a seventh game. In Game 7, the Braves lead 2–0 after two innings after a solo home run from Dansby Swanson, but the Dodgers rallied with a 4–1 run across the next five innings to take the lead for good and secure the pennant.

This was the first of what is currently three NL pennants the Dodgers won during the 2020s decade - they would next win the pennant in 2024 over the New York Mets in six games, and in 2025 they won the pennant in a sweep over the Milwaukee Brewers en route to repeating as World Series champions.

Both teams would meet again in the NLCS the next year, and with Joc Pederson having switched sides, the Braves won in six games en route to a World Series title.

== 2020 World Series ==
=== (AL1) Tampa Bay Rays vs. (NL1) Los Angeles Dodgers ===
Los Angeles won the series, 4–2.

Game	Date	Score	Location	Time	Attendance
1	October 20	Tampa Bay Rays – 3, Los Angeles Dodgers – 8	Globe Life Field	3:24	11,388
2	October 21	Tampa Bay Rays – 6, Los Angeles Dodgers – 4	Globe Life Field	3:40	11,472
3	October 23	Los Angeles Dodgers – 6, Tampa Bay Rays – 2	Globe Life Field	3:14	11,447
4	October 24	Los Angeles Dodgers – 7, Tampa Bay Rays – 8	Globe Life Field	4:10	11,441
5	October 25	Los Angeles Dodgers – 4, Tampa Bay Rays – 2	Globe Life Field	3:30	11,437
6	October 27	Tampa Bay Rays – 1, Los Angeles Dodgers – 3	Globe Life Field	3:28	11,437

This was the third World Series played between both #1 seeds from the AL and NL (1999, 2013), and the first World Series ever played at a neutral site. The Dodgers defeated the Rays in six games to win their first World Series title since 1988 and seventh overall.

Clayton Kershaw pitched six solid innings as the Dodgers blew out the Rays in Game 1. In Game 2, behind Brandon Lowe’s two home runs, the Rays evened the series. Walker Buehler pitched six solid innings as the Dodgers regained the series lead in Game 3. In Game 4, the Rays prevailed in a back-and-forth slugfest to even the series at two on a walk-off error committed by the Dodgers’ Max Muncy in the bottom of the ninth, which scored Randy Arozarena. Kershaw earned his second win of the series as the Dodgers won Game 5 to come within one game of the title. In Game 6, the Rays held a 1–0 lead until the bottom of the sixth inning when Rays’ manager Kevin Cash removed starting pitcher Blake Snell from the mound and replaced him with relief pitcher Nick Anderson. The decision proved to be fatal for the Rays, as the Dodgers scored three unanswered runs in the bottom of the sixth and eighth innings to secure the title.

With the win, the Greater Los Angeles area had both NBA and MLB champions in the same season or calendar year, as the Los Angeles Lakers won the 2020 NBA Finals as well. This was the first time since 1988 that the Dodgers and Lakers brought championships to Los Angeles in the same season or calendar year. This was the first of what is currently three World Series championships won by the Dodgers during the 2020s decade - they would win it again in 2024 over the New York Yankees in five games, and in 2025 they repeated as champions against the Toronto Blue Jays in seven games after being two outs away from elimination in Game 7.

The Rays would return to the World Series in 2026, but lost to the Milwaukee Brewers in five games, bringing their record in the World Series to 0–3.

== Broadcasting ==
This was seventh year of eight-year U.S. TV contracts with ESPN, Fox Sports, and TBS. With the temporary expansion to a 16-team playoff format, Wild Card Series games aired across TBS, ESPN, ESPN2, and ABC. This marked the first time that ABC had MLB playoff games since 1995, and the first time since 2006 that the network began using the ESPN on ABC branding. Fox Sports 1 and MLB Network then split the National League Division Series, and the Fox broadcast network and Fox Sports 1 split the National League Championship Series. TBS had the American League Division Series, and Championship Series. The World Series then aired on the Fox broadcast network for the 21st consecutive year.
