= Ryan Sherriff =

American baseball player (born 1990)

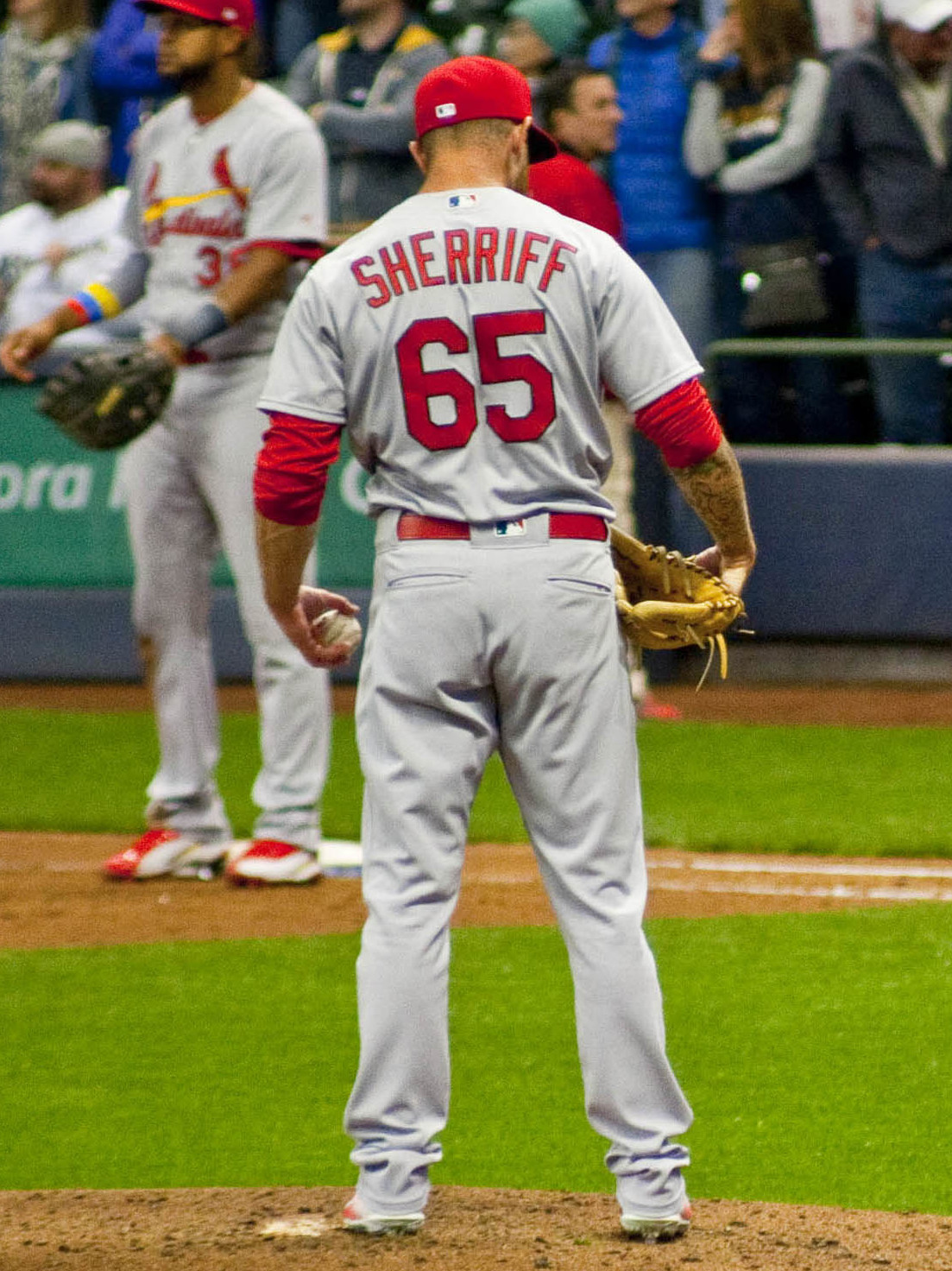
- Sherriff with the St. Louis Cardinals in 2018
- Pitcher
- Born: May 25, 1990 (age 36); Culver City, California, U.S.
- Batted: Left Threw: Left

MLB debut
- August 25, 2017, for the St. Louis Cardinals

Last MLB appearance
- June 3, 2023, for the Boston Red Sox

MLB statistics
- Win–loss record: 3–2
- Earned run average: 3.53
- Strikeouts: 41
- Saves: 2
- Stats at Baseball Reference

Teams
- St. Louis Cardinals (2017–2018); Tampa Bay Rays (2020–2021); Boston Red Sox (2023)

Ryan Sebastian Sherriff (born May 25, 1990) is an American former professional baseball pitcher. He has previously played in Major League Baseball (MLB) for the St. Louis Cardinals, Tampa Bay Rays, and Boston Red Sox.

In 2011 as a sophomore at Glendale Community College, he was named First Team All-Western State Conference South Division. Sherriff was drafted by the St. Louis Cardinals in the 28th round of the 2011 Major League Baseball draft.

In 2012, Sherriff was voted Cardinals Organization Pitcher of the Month in June, and the Cardinal Nation and Scout.com Palm Beach Cardinals Starting Pitcher of the Year. In 2013, he was voted Florida State League Pitcher of the Week on August 5, and again the Palm Beach Cardinals Starting Pitcher of the Year, as he had a 2.57 ERA in 18 starts. In 2014, he was transitioned to be a relief pitcher, and in 44 games in Double–A and Triple–A he had a 2.88 ERA. He was named to the 2016 Pacific Coast League All Star Team, while pitching for the Memphis Redbirds, and finished the 2016 season with a 7-1 record and 3 saves in 49 relief appearances, and a 2.84 ERA. After the 2016 season, the Cardinals assigned him to pitch for the Glendale Desert Dogs in the Arizona Fall League. Sherriff pitched for Team Israel at the 2017 World Baseball Classic qualifier. He was named to the 2017 PCL All Star Team.

Sherriff made his major-league debut in August 2017. He underwent Tommy John surgery in June 2018, ending his season, and was released by the Cardinals two months later. He returned to MLB in 2020 with Tampa Bay, and also pitched for them in 2021. After spending 2022 in the minor leagues, Sherriff again returned to MLB in 2023, with the Red Sox.

== Early life ==
Sherriff was born in Culver City, California. His parents are Larry (died in 2012 of multiple myeloma) and Renee Sherriff. Sherriff is Jewish, and all four of his grandparents were Holocaust survivors. Both of his maternal grandparents were Polish Jews who were held in Nazi concentration camps. They married shortly after World War II before emigrating to the United States.

He attended Culver City High School ('08). There, Sherriff pitched on the school's baseball team.

The Washington Nationals selected Sherriff in the 33rd round of the 2010 Major League Baseball draft from West Los Angeles College (Culver City), but he did not sign. Sherriff transferred to Glendale Community College, where he played in 2011. That season he pitched for the college as a 21-year-old sophomore, and as the team's ace was 5-4 with a 2.45 ERA in 12 starts. He was named 2011 First Team All-Western State Conference South Division.

== Professional career ==
=== St. Louis Cardinals ===
==== Minor Leagues ====
He was drafted a second time by the St. Louis Cardinals in the 28th round of the 2011 Major League Baseball draft, and signed in June. At the time, Sherriff threw a 92-93 mph fastball.

Sherriff began his professional career in 2011 pitching for the Johnson City Cardinals of the Rookie Appalachian League, and for the Batavia Muckdogs of the Low–A New York-Penn League (where he held opposing batters to a .136 batting average).

In 2012, Sherriff was 10-3 with a 3.25 ERA as he started 16 games for the Palm Beach Cardinals of the High–A Florida State League, and shared the lead in the FSL in complete games and shutouts. His 10 wins were tied for 4th among Cardinals minor leaguers, and tied for fifth among Florida State League pitchers. He was voted Cardinals Organization Pitcher of the Month in June 2012, and the 2012 Cardinal Nation and Scout.com Palm Beach Cardinals Starting Pitcher of the Year.

In 2013, Sherriff began the season pitching again for Palm Beach. On August 3, Sherriff took a no-hitter into the ninth inning against the Dunedin Blue Jays, but gave up a hit in the ninth, and finished the game with a one-hit, one-walk shutout. He was voted FSL Pitcher of the Week on August 5, 2013. He was voted the 2013 Cardinal Nation and Scout.com Palm Beach Cardinals Starting Pitcher of the Year. He then pitched for the Springfield Cardinals of the Double–A Texas League. Overall, for the two teams he was 6-5 with a 2.57 ERA in 18 starts.

In spring training in 2014 Sherriff was told he was being transitioned to be a relief pitcher. He began the season pitching for the Springfield Cardinals. He then pitched for the Memphis Redbirds of the Triple–A Pacific Coast League (PCL). In 44 games for the two teams, he had a 2.88 ERA.

In 2015, he again split the season between the Springfield Cardinals and the Memphis Redbirds. In 30 relief appearances for the two teams, Sherriff had a 2.95 ERA.

Sherriff spent the 2016 season with the Memphis Redbirds, and was named to the 2016 PCL All Star Team. Sherriff dropped his arm angle, relied on his sinker, and finished the 2016 season with a 7-1 record and 3 saves in 49 relief appearances (tied for second among Cardinals minor league pitchers), a 2.84 ERA, held left-handers to a .172 batting average, struck out 55 batters in 66.2 innings, and induced a very high percentage of ground balls (61%). After the 2016 season, the Cardinals assigned Sherriff to the Glendale Desert Dogs of the Arizona Fall League.

Sherriff began the 2017 season pitching for the Memphis Redbirds, and once again was named to the 2017 PCL All Star Team, as at mid-season he was third in the league in fewest baserunners per 9 IP (9.61), and fourth in the league in fewest walks per 9 IP (1.56). At the time he was called up to the major leagues in August, he was 5-1 with six saves and a 3.19 earned-run average in 48 games (tied for 4th in the league), in which in 52.2 innings he struck out 47, walked 13, allowed 40 hits, and limited left-handed batters to a .198 batting average.

In his minor league career through 2019, Sherriff was 34-23 with 12 saves and a 3.04 ERA.

==== Major Leagues ====
On August 23, 2017, Sherriff was called up to the major leagues for the first time by the St. Louis Cardinals, after pitching in 217 minor league games in his career, to replace the injured Trevor Rosenthal. At the time he joined one other Glendale alumnus in the major leagues, starting pitcher Marco Estrada of the Toronto Blue Jays. Two days later against the Tampa Bay Rays he became the first Cardinal since José Jiménez in 1998 to throw three scoreless innings in his major league debut. For the season, he was 2-1 with a 3.14 ERA and 15 strikeouts in 14.1 innings, in 13 relief appearances. He held opposing left-handed hitters to a .080 batting average (2-25) with two singles, zero walks, and seven strikeouts, and a 65% ground ball rate.

Sherriff did not make St Louis' 2018 opening day roster, but was recalled on March 31. He was then placed on the disabled list on April 8 with a right toe fracture. He was reactivated on May 4, and then optioned back to Memphis on May 8. Memphis placed him on the disabled list on May 18. In 2018 he pitched four innings for Memphis. He made five appearances with the Cardinals in 2018 before his surgery, allowing four runs over 5.2 innings of relief.

He underwent Tommy John surgery to reconstruct the ulnar collateral ligament in his left elbow on June 5, ending his season and likely sidelining him for at least 12 months. Two months into his rehab from surgery, in August 2018 the Cardinals released him.

=== Tampa Bay Rays ===
On October 16, 2018, Sherriff signed a minor league contract with the Tampa Bay Rays. In 2019 he pitched in four games for the rookie–level Gulf Coast League Rays, and in two games for the Charlotte Stone Crabs of the High–A Florida State League, and had a combined record of 0-1 with one save and a 1.29 ERA.

On August 26, 2020, the Rays selected Sherriff's contract to the active roster, replacing the injured Jalen Beeks. In his Rays debut that day, he earned the win against the Baltimore Orioles.

In the pandemic-shortened 2020 season, Sherriff was 1-0 with one save and a perfect 0.00 ERA, as in 10 relief appearances he pitched 9 2/3 scoreless innings and had an 0.828 WHIP, holding batters to a .188 batting average. He was the only pitcher in the American League to not give up an earned run, of those who pitched 9.2 or more innings. Of those pitchers, he also had the 4th-lowest slugging percentage against, at .188. Through 2020, he had induced ground balls 60.4% of the time. Through 2020, he also held left-handed batters to a .125/.143/.146 line and a .289 On-base Plus Slugging percentage in his career.

He relieved in two games in the 2020 World Series, pitching two scoreless innings without allowing any hits.

After blowing a save in a 6-4 win against the Miami Marlins the previous day, on April 3, 2021, Sherriff was placed on the restricted list to "take some time away from the game." In 16 contests for the Rays, he recorded a 5.52 ERA with 16 strikeouts and one save in 14 2/3 innings pitched.

=== Philadelphia Phillies ===
On November 5, 2021, Sherriff was claimed off waivers by the Philadelphia Phillies. Sherriff was shut down in late March due to biceps tendinitis, and was later transferred to the 60-day injured list on April 25, 2022. On August 1, Sherriff was designated for assignment but was not claimed by another team from waivers, thus remaining in the Phillies organization with the Triple-A Lehigh Valley IronPigs. In 2022 he pitched for the Single-A Clearwater Threshers (two innings), Double-A Reading Fightin Phils (one inning), and Lehigh Valley (11 1/3 innings). He was a combined 1-0 with a 2.51 ERA, as in 14 1/3 innings in relief he struck out 18 batters. Sherriff elected free agency following the season on November 10.

=== Boston Red Sox ===
On January 23, 2023, Sherriff signed a minor league contract with the Boston Red Sox organization. He began the year with the Triple-A Worcester Red Sox, making 15 appearances and working to a 3.00 ERA with 16 strikeouts in 15 innings pitched. On May 16, Sherriff's contract was selected to the active roster. After making two one-inning appearances for Boston, he was optioned back to Worcester on May 18. Sherriff was next recalled to Boston on May 30.

In five games for Boston, Sherriff logged a 2.70 ERA with five strikeouts in 6 2/3 innings pitched, which included him pitching in both games of a doubleheader. On July 7, he was designated for assignment by the Red Sox after Yu Chang was activated from the injured list. In 21 games for Worcester, he was 2-1 with two saves and a 2.82 ERA as in 22 1/3 innings he gave up 17 hits and had 24 strikeouts, and had a .207 batting average against. On July 10, Sherriff elected to become a free agent in lieu of accepting a minor league assignment.

=== Los Angeles Dodgers ===
On July 25, 2023, Sherriff signed a minor league contract with the Los Angeles Dodgers organization. In only two appearances in 1 2/3 innings of work for the Triple–A Oklahoma City Dodgers, as he was dealing with arm issues he allowed five runs with three strikeouts. On August 24, Sherriff was released by the Dodgers.

Sherriff retired following the 2023 season, at 33 years of age. He wrote on Instagram: "13 years, 2 World Series appearances, (two-time) Triple-A All-Star (2016 & 2017), (one-time) (World Baseball Classic) qualifier, 28th round draft pick from Culver City, (California), I can definitely hang my cleats up knowing I gave it all I can."

In January 2024 he said that he was open to a comeback.

In his five major league seasons he was 3-2 with two saves and a 3.53 ERA in 49 games covering 51 innings, with a 52.6% ground ball rate. In his 12 minor league seasons Sherriff was 43-28 with 15 saves and a 3.08 ERA in 297 games covering 556 innings.

=== Leones de Yucatán ===
On January 8, 2025, Sherriff came out of retirement and signed with the Leones de Yucatán of the Mexican League. In 6 games 5 innings of relief he went 0-1 with a 3.60 ERA with more walks (5) than strikeouts (4). He became a free agent following the season.

He announced his retirement once again on June 29, 2026.

== International career; Team Israel ==
Sherriff's Jewish faith and heritage allow him to play for the Israeli national baseball team at international baseball tournaments, and he pitched with Team Israel for the qualifying rounds of the 2017 World Baseball Classic. He was credited with a hold during the first game of the qualifying round, striking out the final batter for Great Britain in the eighth inning of a 5–2 Israel victory. He had another hold in the next qualifying game, again finishing the eighth inning in a 1–0 win against Brazil. Sherriff referred to the experience as "just so fun", and said that it was "a great honor" to represent Israel.

== See also ==
- List of baseball players who underwent Tommy John surgery
- List of Jewish Major League Baseball players
