= Payton Henry =

American baseball player (born 1997)

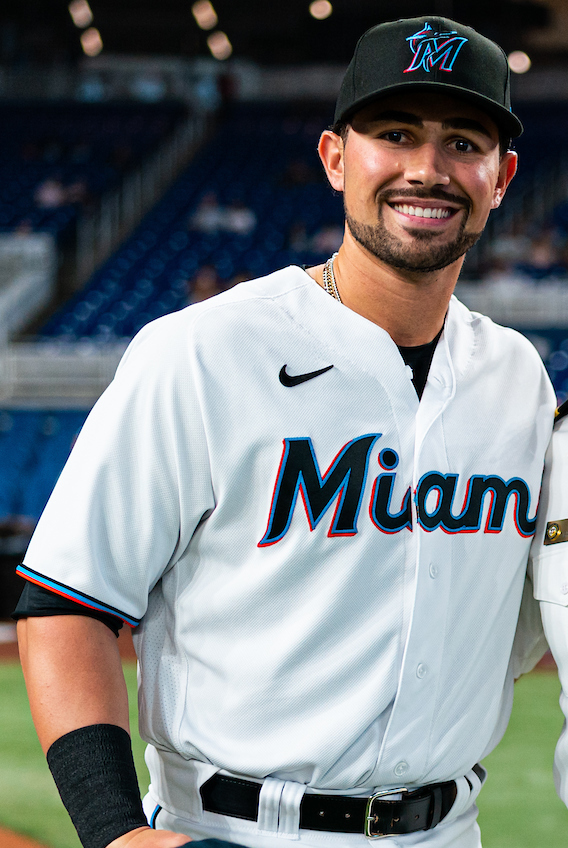
- Henry with the Miami Marlins in 2022

Free agent
- Catcher
- Born: June 24, 1997 (age 29); American Fork, Utah, U.S.
- Bats: Right Throws: Right

MLB debut
- September 17, 2021, for the Miami Marlins

MLB statistics (through 2022 season)
- Batting average: .186
- Home runs: 0
- Runs batted in: 4
- Stats at Baseball Reference

Teams
- Miami Marlins (2021–2022)

Payton Anthony Henry (born June 24, 1997) is an American professional baseball catcher who is a free agent. He has previously played in Major League Baseball (MLB) for the Miami Marlins.

== Amateur career ==
Henry attended Pleasant Grove High School in Pleasant Grove, Utah. He originally committed to play college baseball at the University of Nevada, Las Vegas, but he decommitted during his junior year. He later committed to Brigham Young University. As a junior in 2015, he hit .527 with nine home runs, and was named the Gatorade Player of the Year for the state of Utah. In 2016, his senior year, he batted .519 with seven home runs alongside pitching to a 2.91 ERA, earning Utah Gatorade Player of the Year honors for the second straight season.

== Professional career ==
=== Milwaukee Brewers ===
The Milwaukee Brewers selected Henry in the sixth round of the 2016 Major League Baseball draft. He signed with the Brewers for $550,000, forgoing his college commitment. Henry made his professional debut after signing with the Rookie-level Arizona League Brewers, hitting .256 with 17 RBI over 24 games.

In 2017, Henry played with the Helena Brewers of the Rookie-level Pioneer League where he batted .242 with seven home runs and 33 RBI over 55 games. He spent the 2018 season with the Wisconsin Timber Rattlers of the Single–A Midwest League, with whom he was named an All–Star and slashed .234/.327/.380 with ten home runs and 41 RBI over 98 games. He was awarded a Gold Glove after the season. In 2019, he spent the year with the Carolina Mudcats of the High–A Carolina League, earning All-Star honors and batting .242/.315/.395 with 14 home runs and 75 RBI over 121 games, as he led the league in double plays grounded into with 18, and was third in strikeouts, with 142.

Henry did not play in a game in 2020 due to the cancellation of the minor league season because of the COVID-19 pandemic. He was not added to Milwaukee's 40-man roster, and became eligible for the 2020 Rule 5 draft, but was not selected.

To begin the 2021 season, Henry was assigned to the Biloxi Shuckers of the Double-A South, with whom he batted .188. In mid-June, he was promoted to the Nashville Sounds of the Triple-A East.

=== Miami Marlins ===
On July 30, 2021, Henry was traded to the Miami Marlins in exchange for John Curtiss. He was then assigned to the Jacksonville Jumbo Shrimp of the Triple-A East. Over 71 games with Biloxi, Nashville, and Jacksonville, Henry hit .266/.351/.390 with six home runs and 27 RBIs.

On September 17, Miami selected Henry's contract and promoted him to the active roster to make his MLB debut that night. He started at catcher and collected one hit, a double, over four at-bats versus the Pittsburgh Pirates. Henry had 15 at-bats for the Marlins in 2021 in which he collected four hits. In 2022, Henry made 15 major-league appearances for Miami, going 4-for-28 with five walks and 4 RBI.

=== Milwaukee Brewers (second stint) ===
On November 10, 2022, Henry was traded to the Milwaukee Brewers in exchange for outfielder Reminton Batista. Henry was optioned to the Triple-A Nashville Sounds to begin the 2023 season. Henry went 3-for-15 in 5 games for Nashville before he was designated for assignment on April 13, 2023. He cleared waivers and was sent outright to Nashville on April 17. Henry played in a total of 65 games for the Sounds, batting .294/.341/.454 with nine home runs and 35 RBI. He elected free agency following the season on November 6.

=== Toronto Blue Jays ===
On December 8, 2023, Henry signed a minor league contract with the Toronto Blue Jays. He began the year with the Triple–A Buffalo Bisons of the International League. During a game against the Syracuse Mets on May 31, 2024, Henry was hit in the back of the head by a swing by Pablo Reyes. He was carted off of the field and taken to a hospital. In 27 total games for Buffalo, he slashed .274/.337/.432 with three home runs and 18 RBI. Henry elected free agency following the season on November 4.

=== Philadelphia Phillies ===
On December 10, 2024, Henry signed a minor league contract with the Philadelphia Phillies. He made 66 appearances split between the Triple-A Lehigh Valley IronPigs and High-A Jersey Shore BlueClaws, hitting .247/.324/.412 with 11 home runs and 47 RBI. Henry elected free agency following the season on November 6, 2025.

=== New York Yankees ===
On December 13, 2025, Henry signed a minor league contract with the New York Yankees. He played with the Triple-A Scranton/Wilkes-Barre RailRiders and hit .224 with four home runs and 14 RBI across 48 games. On July 2, 2026, Henry was released by the Yankees.

=== Philadelphia Phillies (second stint) ===
On July 4, 2026, Henry signed a minor league contract with the Philadelphia Phillies. He was assigned to the Triple-A Lehigh Valley IronPigs. On July 24, the Phillies selected Henry's contract, adding him to their active roster. On August 3, he was designated for assignment without having appeared for Philadelphia. Henry cleared waivers and was sent outright to Lehigh Valley on August 6. He played in 26 games for Lehigh Valley and batted .235 with four home runs and 11 RBI. He elected free agency on October 13.

== Personal life ==
Henry is a member of the Church of Jesus Christ of Latter-day Saints.
