= Nick Anderson (baseball) =

American baseball player (born 1990)

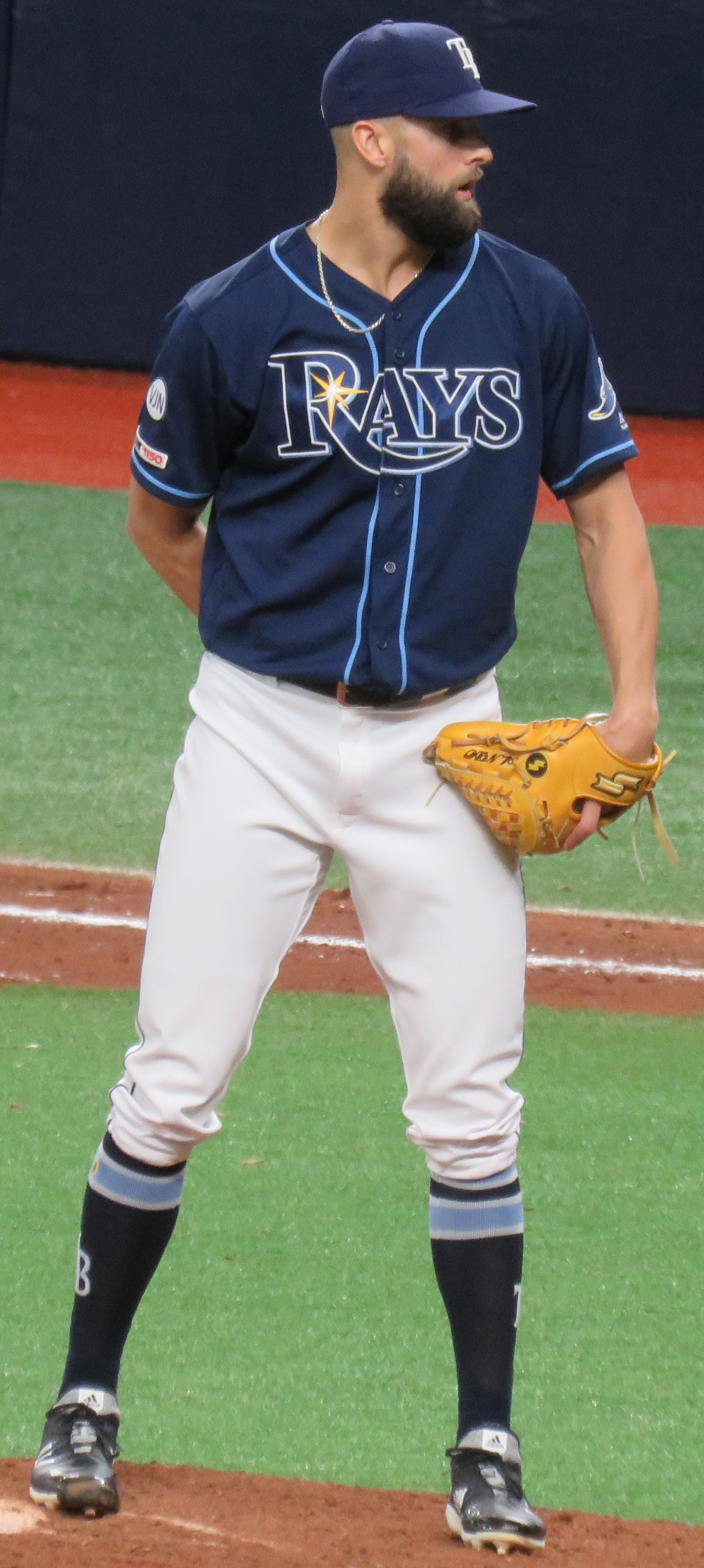
- Anderson with the Tampa Bay Rays in 2019
- Pitcher
- Born: July 5, 1990 (age 36); Crosby, Minnesota, U.S.
- Batted: Right Threw: Right

MLB debut
- March 28, 2019, for the Miami Marlins

Last MLB appearance
- August 27, 2025, for the Colorado Rockies

MLB statistics
- Win–loss record: 14–7
- Earned run average: 3.40
- Strikeouts: 211
- Stats at Baseball Reference

Teams
- Miami Marlins (2019); Tampa Bay Rays (2019–2021); Atlanta Braves (2023); Kansas City Royals (2024); Colorado Rockies (2025)

Career highlights and awards
- All-MLB First Team (2020)

Nicholas Paul Anderson (born July 5, 1990) is an American former professional baseball pitcher. He played in Major League Baseball (MLB) for the Miami Marlins, Tampa Bay Rays, Atlanta Braves, Kansas City Royals, and Colorado Rockies.

== Amateur career ==
Anderson attended Brainerd High School in Brainerd, Minnesota. He played college baseball at NCAA Division II school St. Cloud State University in St. Cloud, Minnesota for three years (2009–2011). In 2010, he played summer baseball for the Brainerd Lakes Area Lunkers of the Northwoods League. He transferred to NAIA school Mayville State University in Mayville, North Dakota for his senior season in 2012. In 12 games (11 starts) his senior year, he went 5–2 with a 1.95 ERA and was named the Dakota Athletic Conference pitcher of the year.

== Professional career ==
=== Frontier League ===
The Milwaukee Brewers selected Anderson in the 32nd round of the 2012 MLB draft. He did not sign with the Brewers and played in the independent baseball Frontier League for three seasons. He played for the Rockford RiverHawks/Aviators in 2012 and 2013, and for the Frontier Greys in 2015.

=== Minnesota Twins ===
Anderson's contract was purchased by the Minnesota Twins on August 7, 2015. He played in nine games for the Single-A Cedar Rapids Kernels in 2015, recording a 0.75 ERA with 12 strikeouts and four saves over 12 innings. Anderson split the 2016 season between Cedar Rapids and the High-A Fort Myers Miracle, accumulating a 4–3 record with a 2.65 ERA, 75 strikeouts, and 13 saves across 57 2/3 innings pitched. In 2017, he played for Fort Myers and the Double-A Chattanooga Lookouts, registering a combined a 4–1 record with a 1.00 ERA, 57 strikeouts, and 11 saves over 53 1/3 innings pitched. Anderson spent the 2018 season with the Triple-A Rochester Red Wings, going 8–2 with a 3.30 ERA, 88 strikeouts, and four saves over 60 innings of work.

=== Miami Marlins ===
On November 20, 2018, the Twins traded Anderson to the Miami Marlins in exchange for Brian Schales; the Marlins subsequently added him to their 40-man roster.

Anderson made the Marlins' 2019 Opening Day roster. On March 28, 2019, he made his major league debut against the Colorado Rockies. Anderson retired Ryan McMahon, the only batter he faced.

Anderson collected his first major league win on May 21 in a 5–4 11-inning game against the Detroit Tigers. He pitched the final two innings, allowing no runs while striking out a career-high five batters. By the end of July, Anderson had appeared in 45 games with 69 strikeouts in 43 2/3 innings for the Marlins.

=== Tampa Bay Rays ===
On July 31, 2019, Anderson was traded to the Tampa Bay Rays (along with Trevor Richards) in exchange for Jesús Sánchez and Ryne Stanek. After the trade, he had an ERA of 2.11 in 21 1/3 innings with 41 strikeouts. He was named to the Baseball America All-Rookie team and won the Dick Siebert Award, given by Minnesota baseball writers to the best player from the Upper Midwest, in 2019.

In 2020, Anderson went 2–1 with six saves and an 0.55 ERA in 16 1/3 innings over 19 games. In the 2020 postseason, as the Rays made their second World Series appearance in franchise history, Anderson made seven consecutive postseason appearances while allowing a run, breaking an MLB record. After the season, he was named to the All-MLB Team.

On March 25, 2021, it was announced that Anderson had suffered a partial tear of his elbow ligament and would miss time until at least the All-Star break. On March 26, Anderson was placed on the 60-day injured list (IL). Anderson was activated from the IL on September 12 to make his season debut. Anderson was able to work to a 4.50 ERA in 6 appearances for the Rays in 2021. On October 27, Anderson underwent right elbow surgery to repair his ulnar collateral ligament with an internal brace procedure. The surgery was an alternative to Tommy John surgery, but Anderson was projected to remain out through the 2022 All-Star break.

On March 22, 2022, Anderson signed a $845,000 contract with the Rays, avoiding salary arbitration. On August 22, Anderson was activated from the IL and optioned to Triple-A Durham Bulls. On November 9, Anderson was placed on outright waivers. After clearing waivers, Anderson became a free agent the next day.

=== Atlanta Braves ===
On November 11, 2022, Anderson signed a one-year, non-guaranteed split contract with the Atlanta Braves. Anderson was optioned to the Triple-A Gwinnett Stripers to begin the 2023 season. However, after it was revealed that Raisel Iglesias would begin the year on the IL, the Braves announced that Anderson had made the Opening Day roster as part of the bullpen. After posting a 3.06 ERA with 36 strikeouts through 35 games, Anderson was placed on the 60-day IL with a right shoulder strain on July 13, 2023.

=== Kansas City Royals ===
On November 17, 2023, the Braves traded Anderson to the Kansas City Royals in exchange for cash considerations. In 37 relief outings for the Royals, he compiled a 3–1 record with 1 save, and a 4.04 ERA with 29 strikeouts and 15 walks across 35 2/3 innings pitched. Anderson was designated for assignment by the Royals on July 13, 2024, after the team acquired reliever Hunter Harvey in a trade with the Washington Nationals. The Royals released Anderson on July 18.

=== Los Angeles Dodgers ===
On July 21, 2024, Anderson signed a minor league contract with the Los Angeles Dodgers. He pitched 4 1/3 innings over three games, and allowed three runs on three hits and three walks for the Triple-A Oklahoma City Baseball Club. He was released on August 27 after opting out of his contract.

=== Baltimore Orioles ===
On August 28, 2024, Anderson signed a minor league contract with the Baltimore Orioles organization. He made 2 scoreless appearances for the Triple-A Norfolk Tides, striking out 2 batters over 2 innings of work. He elected free agency following the season on November 4.

=== St. Louis Cardinals ===
On February 7, 2025, Anderson signed a minor league contract with the St. Louis Cardinals. In 17 appearances for the Triple-A Memphis Redbirds, he posted an 0–1 record and 6.20 ERA with 20 strikeouts across 20 1/3 innings pitched. The Cardinals released Anderson on May 30.

=== Colorado Rockies ===
On May 30, 2025, Anderson signed a minor league contract with the Colorado Rockies. In 14 outings for the Triple-A Albuquerque Isotopes, he logged a 1-1 record and 5.11 ERA with 15 strikeouts and four saves across 12 1/3 innings pitched. On July 25, the Rockies selected Anderson's contract, adding him to their active roster. In 12 appearances for Colorado, he struggled to a 6.14 ERA with 10 strikeouts across 14 2/3 innings pitched. On August 29, Anderson elected free agency rather than accept an outright assignment to Triple-A Albuquerque.

=== Seattle Mariners ===
On August 31, 2025, Anderson signed a minor league contract with the Seattle Mariners. He pitched in six games for the Triple-A Tacoma Rainiers, logging a 1-0 record and 3.18 ERA with 10 strikeouts across 5 2/3 innings pitched. Anderson elected free agency following the season on November 6.

=== Athletics ===
On November 12, 2025, Anderson signed a minor league contract with the Athletics. He began the 2026 season with the Triple-A Las Vegas Aviators, where he compiled a 2-1 record and 2.16 ERA with 16 strikeouts and three saves across 16 2/3 innings pitched. Anderson announced his retirement from professional baseball on May 23, 2026.

== Personal life ==
In 2010, while at St. Cloud State University, Anderson received a drunken driving charge. In 2011, he spent eight days in jail on an assault charge that involved a baseball bat and alcohol. He received probation and underwent mandatory Alcoholics Anonymous and anger management classes.
