= John Curtiss (baseball) =

American baseball player (born 1993)

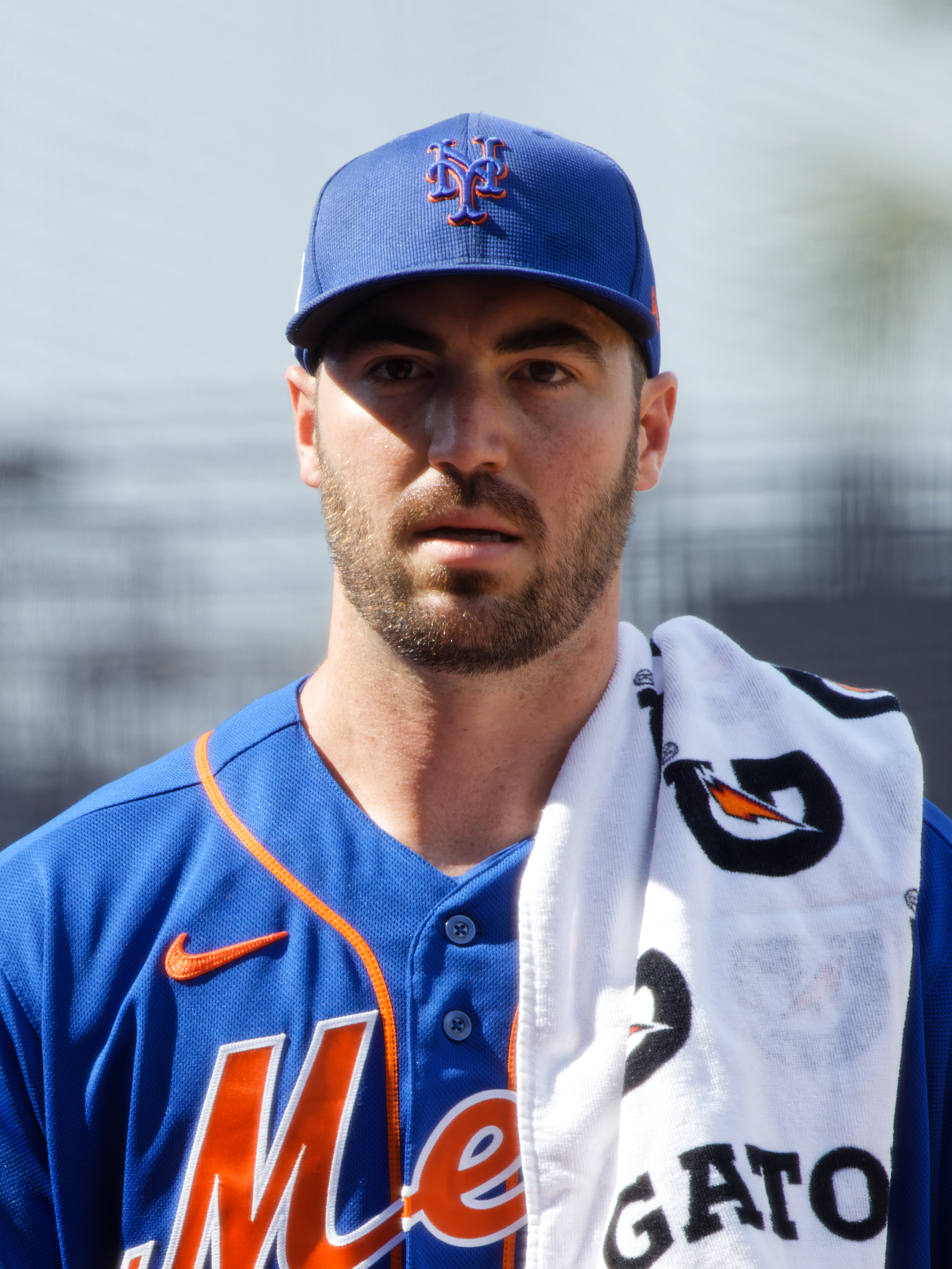
- Curtiss with the Mets in 2023

Free agent
- Pitcher
- Born: April 5, 1993 (age 33); Dallas, Texas, U.S.
- Bats: Right Throws: Right

MLB debut
- August 25, 2017, for the Minnesota Twins

MLB statistics (through 2025 season)
- Win–loss record: 9–4
- Earned run average: 4.03
- Strikeouts: 128
- Stats at Baseball Reference

Teams
- Minnesota Twins (2017–2018); Los Angeles Angels (2019); Tampa Bay Rays (2020); Miami Marlins (2021); Milwaukee Brewers (2021); New York Mets (2023); Colorado Rockies (2024); Arizona Diamondbacks (2025)

John Pickens Curtiss (born April 5, 1993) is an American professional baseball pitcher who is a free agent. He has previously played in Major League Baseball (MLB) for the Minnesota Twins, Los Angeles Angels, Tampa Bay Rays, Miami Marlins, Milwaukee Brewers, New York Mets, Colorado Rockies, and Arizona Diamondbacks.

== Career ==
Curtiss attended Carroll Senior High School in Southlake, Texas. He was drafted by the Colorado Rockies in the 30th round of the 2011 Major League Baseball draft but did not sign with them and attended the University of Texas at Austin and played college baseball for the Texas Longhorns.

=== Minnesota Twins ===
Curtiss was drafted by the Minnesota Twins in the sixth round, with the 170th overall selection, of the 2014 MLB draft.

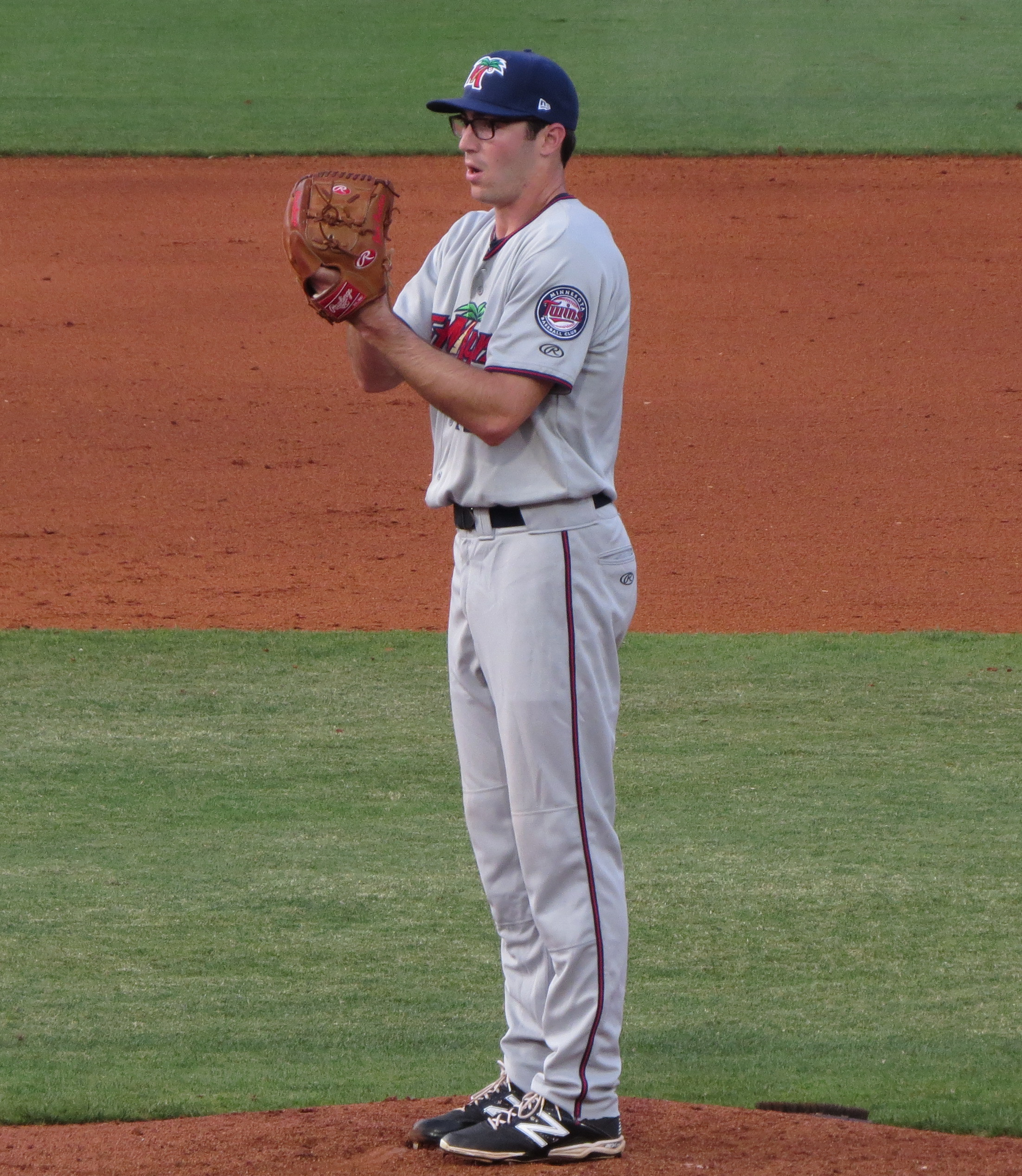
Curtiss with the Fort Myers Miracle

Curtiss made his professional debut with the Elizabethton Twins. He played 2015 with the Gulf Coast Twins and Cedar Rapids Kernels and 2016 with Cedar Rapids and Fort Myers Miracle. After the 2016 season, he played in the Arizona Fall League. Curtiss started 2017 with the Chattanooga Lookouts and was promoted to the Rochester Red Wings.

On August 23, 2017, Curtiss was selected to the 40-man roster and promoted to the major leagues for the first time. He made nine appearances for Minnesota during his rookie campaign, but struggled to an 8.31 ERA with 10 strikeouts across 8 2/3 innings pitched.

Curtiss pitched in eight contests for the Twins in 2018, posting an 0-1 record and 5.68 ERA with seven strikeouts over 6 1/3 innings of work. On January 14, 2019, Curtiss was designated for assignment by the Twins following the signing of Blake Parker.

=== Los Angeles Angels ===
After being designated for assignment, Curtiss was traded to the Los Angeles Angels in exchange for Daniel Ozoria on January 15, 2019. He opened the 2019 season with the Salt Lake Bees. He appeared in one game for the Angels on April 15. On April 30, he was designated for assignment. He was outrighted on May 3, but refused the assignment in favor of free agency.

=== Philadelphia Phillies ===
On June 12, 2019, Curtiss signed a minor league contract with the Philadelphia Phillies. In 8 appearances for the Triple-A Lehigh Valley IronPigs, he struggled to a 10.95 ERA with 15 strikeouts across 12 1/3 innings pitched. Curtiss was released by the Phillies organization on July 7.

=== Tampa Bay Rays ===
On February 3, 2020, Curtiss signed a minor league contract with the Tampa Bay Rays. He was called up on August 9, after Oliver Drake was placed on the injured list, and made his debut that day, pitching two perfect innings in a 4–3 victory over the New York Yankees. Curtiss earned his first major league win on August 11 in an 8–2 victory over the Boston Red Sox. Curtiss was the winning pitcher in Game 4 of the 2020 World Series, in which the Rays walked off the Los Angeles Dodgers 8–7 in a finish labelled as an "instant classic." However, the Rays would go on to lose the World Series four games to two.

=== Miami Marlins ===
On February 17, 2021, Curtiss was traded to the Miami Marlins in exchange for Evan Edwards. In 35 appearances for the Marlins, he posted a 3-1 record and 2.48 ERA with 40 strikeouts across 40 innings of work.

=== Milwaukee Brewers ===
On July 30, 2021, Curtiss was traded to the Milwaukee Brewers in exchange for Payton Henry. In 6 games for Milwaukee, he struggled to a 12.46 ERA with 4 strikeouts across 4 1/3 innings pitched. On August 11, Curtiss was placed on the injured list after suffering a torn ulnar collateral ligament in his right elbow, ending his season. On September 7, Curtiss underwent Tommy John surgery. On November 30, Curtiss was non-tendered by the Brewers, making him a free agent.

=== New York Mets ===
On April 6, 2022, Curtiss signed a major league contract with the New York Mets. Because of his injury from the year prior, Curtiss missed the entirety of the 2022 season. On November 10, the Mets exercised Curtiss' $775K option for the 2023 season.

Curtiss made 15 appearances for the Mets, posting a 4.58 ERA with 16 strikeouts in 19 2/3 innings pitched. On August 14, 2023, he was placed on the 60–day injured list with a loose body in his right elbow. On August 22, Curtiss underwent season–ending surgery to remove the loose body from his elbow. Following the season on November 2, Curtiss was removed from the 40–man roster and sent outright to the Triple–A Syracuse Mets. He elected free agency on November 6.

=== Colorado Rockies ===
On January 25, 2024, Curtiss signed a minor league contract with the Colorado Rockies. In 17 games for the Triple–A Albuquerque Isotopes, he struggled to a 6.75 ERA with 18 strikeouts across 21 1/3 innings pitched. On May 24, the Rockies selected Curtiss' contract, adding him to their active roster. In his only appearance for Colorado, he allowed two runs on three hits in 1/3 of an inning. On May 27, Curtiss was designated for assignment by the club. He cleared waivers and was sent outright to Albuquerque on May 30, however he rejected the assignment and subsequently elected free agency. Curtiss re–signed with the Rockies on a new minor league contract the following day. The Rockies released him from the organization on July 1, however re-signed him to a new minor league contract two days later. On July 27, Curtiss' contract was purchased, and he was added back to the major league roster. After allowing a run in each of his two appearances, he was designated for assignment on August 6. Curtiss cleared waivers and was outrighted to Albuquerque on August 9. He elected free agency on September 30.

=== Arizona Diamondbacks ===
On February 11, 2025, Curtiss signed a minor league contract with the Arizona Diamondbacks. In 25 appearances for the Triple-A Reno Aces, he logged a 1-1 record and 6.34 ERA with 28 strikeouts and two saves across 32 2/3 innings pitched. On June 28, the Diamondbacks selected Curtiss' contract, adding him to their active roster. In 30 appearances for the Diamondbacks, he posted a 3-2 record and 3.93 ERA with 24 strikeouts and one save across 36 2/3 innings pitched. On November 6, Curtiss was removed from the 40-man roster and sent outright to Reno. He elected free agency that same day.

On December 16, 2025, Curtiss re-signed with the Diamondbacks organization on a minor league contract. He made 12 appearances for Triple-A Reno, posting a 1-0 record and 4.02 ERA with 13 strikeouts across 15 2/3 innings pitched. Curtiss was released by the Diamondbacks organization on May 15, 2026.

=== Charros de Jalisco ===
On May 27, 2026, Curtiss signed with the Charros de Jalisco of the Mexican League. In 13 relief appearances for the team, he posted a 1–1 record with a 5.11 ERA and nine strikeouts across 12 1/3 innings pitched. On July 17, Curtiss was released by Jalisco.

== Music ==
Curtiss became interested in country music at the University of Texas. He learned to play the guitar while recovering from injuries, which he said "kept me sane when I was super stressed out." As a songwriter, he often composes music while traveling with his team.

On September 2, 2018, he performed the national anthem ahead of the Red Wings' game against the Lehigh Valley IronPigs.

He released his first album in 2025.
