= Jalen Beeks =

American baseball player (born 1993)

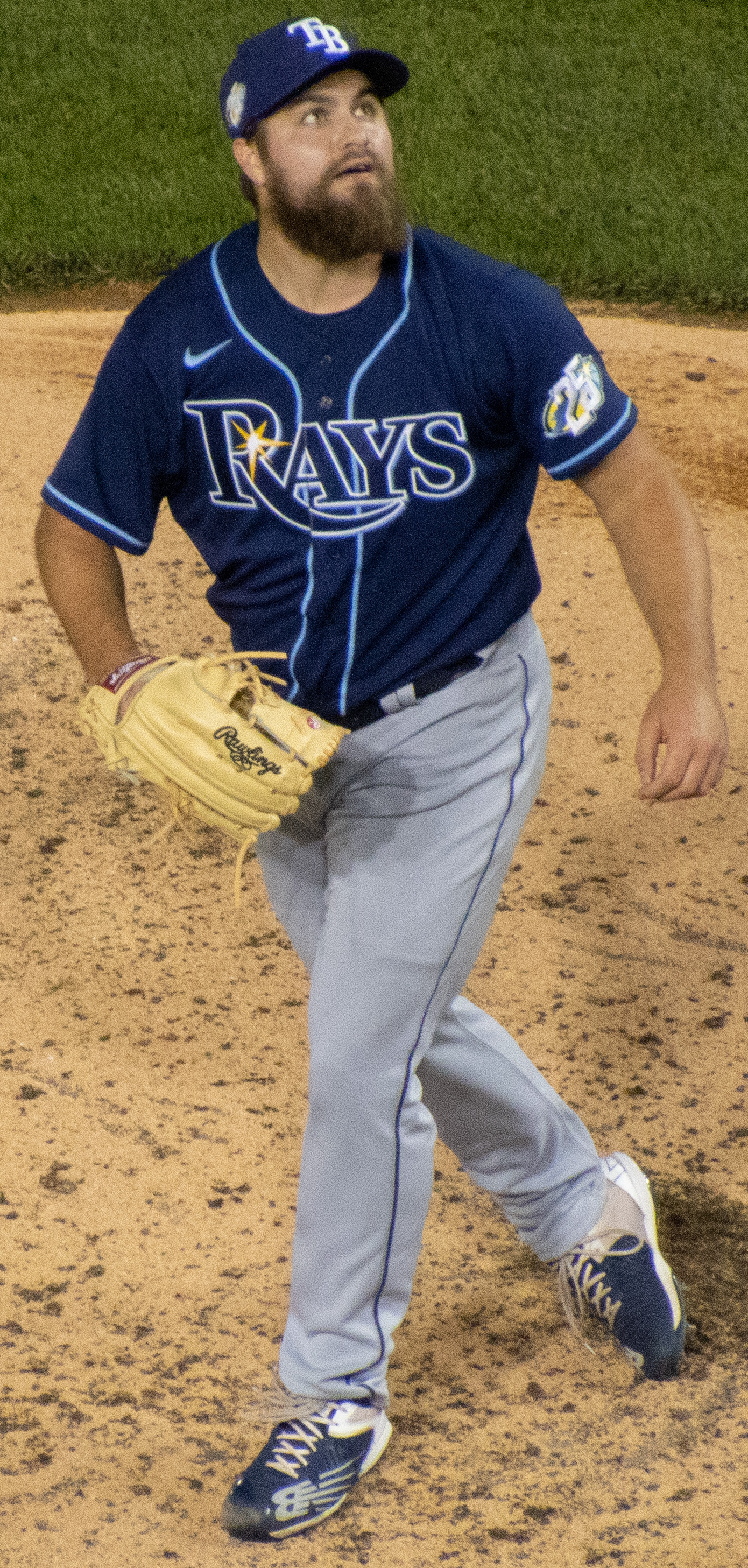
- Beeks with the Tampa Bay Rays in 2023

Free agent
- Pitcher
- Born: July 10, 1993 (age 33); Fayetteville, Arkansas, U.S.
- Bats: Left Throws: Left

MLB debut
- June 7, 2018, for the Boston Red Sox

MLB statistics (through 2026 season)
- Win–loss record: 30–19
- Earned run average: 4.28
- Strikeouts: 397
- Stats at Baseball Reference

Teams
- Boston Red Sox (2018); Tampa Bay Rays (2018–2020, 2022–2023); Colorado Rockies (2024); Pittsburgh Pirates (2024); Arizona Diamondbacks (2025); Texas Rangers (2026)

Jalen Christopher Beeks (born July 10, 1993) is an American professional baseball pitcher who is a free agent. He has played in Major League Baseball (MLB) for the Boston Red Sox, Tampa Bay Rays, Colorado Rockies, Pittsburgh Pirates, Arizona Diamondbacks, and Texas Rangers. The Red Sox selected Beeks in the 12th round of the 2014 MLB draft, and he made his MLB debut for them in 2018.

== Career ==
=== Amateur career ===
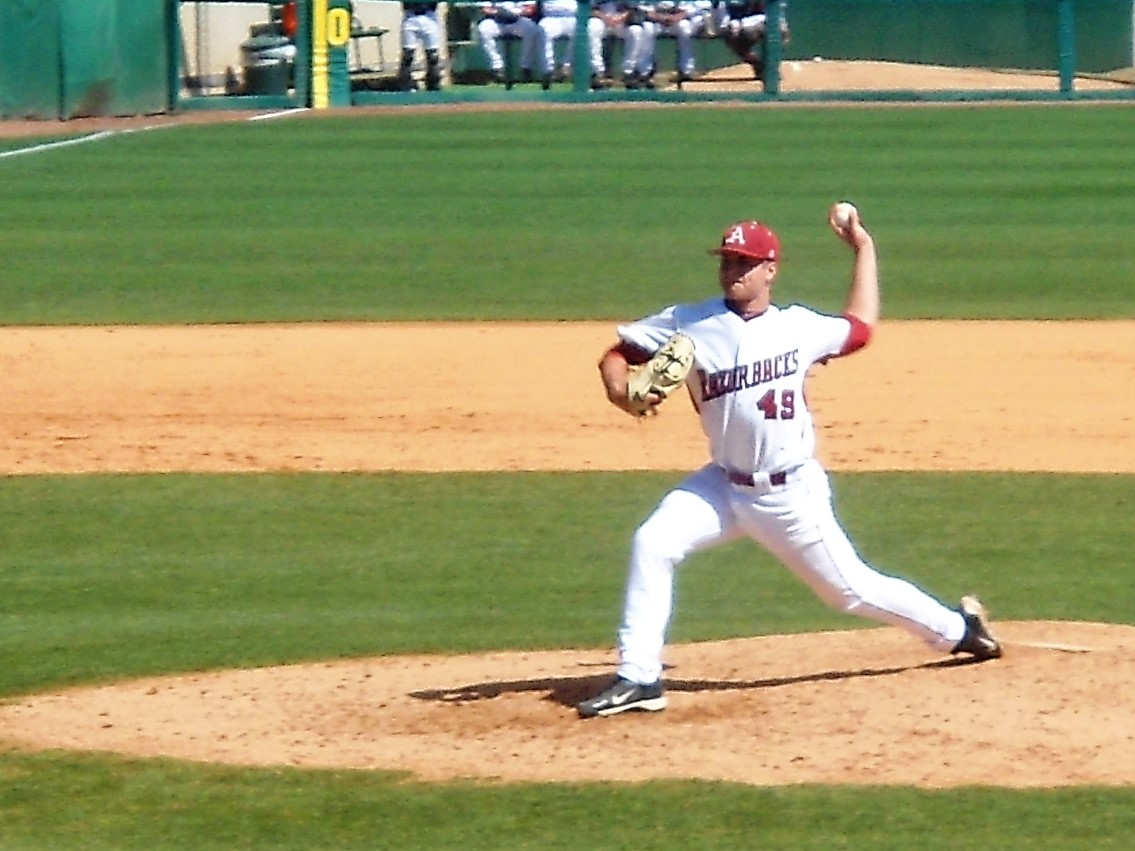
Beeks pitching for the Razorbacks in 2013

Beeks attended Prairie Grove High School in Prairie Grove, Arkansas. He played for the school's baseball team and graduated in 2011. He enrolled at Crowder College, and transferred to the University of Arkansas, where he played college baseball for the Arkansas Razorbacks. A reliable reliever during the 2013 season, Beeks allowed the game-tying and go-ahead runs on consecutive wild pitches during an intentional walk in the 7th inning against the Kansas State Wildcats in the Manhattan Regional. The Razorbacks were eliminated from the postseason following the 4–3 loss.

After the 2013 season, he played collegiate summer baseball with the Harwich Mariners of the Cape Cod Baseball League, and was named a league all-star. Beeks returned to Arkansas for the 2014 season as the opening day starter, starting 13 games with a 6–4 record and 1.98 earned run average (ERA).

=== Boston Red Sox ===
The Boston Red Sox drafted Beeks in the 12th round, with the 374th overall selection, of the 2014 Major League Baseball draft. He signed and made his debut that same year for the rookie-level Gulf Coast League Red Sox, pitching five scoreless innings. In 2015, he pitched for the Greenville Drive of the Single-A South Atlantic League, where he had a 9–7 win–loss record with a 4.32 earned run average (ERA) in 26 starts, and in 2016, he pitched both for the Salem Red Sox of the High-A Carolina League and Portland Sea Dogs of the Double-A Eastern League, compiling a combined 9–8 record and 3.87 ERA in 26 starts.

In 2017, Beeks played for Portland and the Pawtucket Red Sox of the Triple-A International League. The Red Sox named him their Minor League Pitcher of the Year after he posted a combined 11–8 record, 3.29 ERA, and 1.21 WHIP in 26 games started between the two teams. The Red Sox added Beeks to their 40-man roster after the 2017 season, in order to protect him from the Rule 5 draft. He began the 2018 season with Pawtucket.

Beeks was promoted to Boston's active roster on June 7, 2018, in order to make his MLB debut in a start against the Detroit Tigers. Beeks gave up five first-inning runs and took the loss; he was optioned back to Pawtucket the next day. Beeks was recalled to Boston on July 10; he pitched 2 1/3 innings that day, allowing four hits and three runs, and was then returned to Triple-A.

=== Tampa Bay Rays ===
On July 25, 2018, the Red Sox traded Beeks to the Tampa Bay Rays in exchange for right-handed pitcher Nathan Eovaldi. With the Rays, Beeks made 12 appearances through the end of the season, compiling a 5–0 record with a 4.47 ERA and 37 strikeouts in 44 1/3 innings.

Beeks began the 2019 season with Tampa Bay. He was optioned to the Triple-A Durham Bulls on June 28, and was recalled on July 16. He finished the season with a 6–3 record, 4.31 ERA, 1.49 WHIP and 89 strikeouts over 104 1/3 innings at the MLB level.

On August 25, 2020, Beeks tore his ulnar collateral ligament while pitching against the Baltimore Orioles, ending his season and requiring Tommy John surgery. On February 17, 2021, Beeks was placed on the 60-day injured list as he continued to recover from Tommy John surgery.

On March 22, 2022, Beeks signed a $750,000 contract with the Rays, avoiding salary arbitration. On June 4, Beeks, along with 4 other Rays teammates, opted out of wearing a Rays team logo and cap in support of LGBTQ+ Pride, during the team's annual Pride Night celebration at Tropicana Field. In 42 appearances for the club in 2022, he registered a 2.80 ERA with 70 strikeouts and 2 saves in 61.0 innings of work.

In 2023, Beeks made 30 appearances for the Rays, but struggled to a 5.95 ERA with 47 strikeouts across 42 1/3 innings pitched. Following the season on November 4, Beeks was removed from the 40–man roster and placed on outright waivers.

=== Colorado Rockies ===
On November 6, 2023, Beeks was claimed off waivers by the Colorado Rockies. In 45 appearances for Colorado in 2024, Beeks compiled a 6–4 record and 4.74 ERA with 38 strikeouts and 9 saves.

=== Pittsburgh Pirates ===
On July 29, 2024, Beeks was traded to the Pittsburgh Pirates in exchange for pitcher Luis Peralta. In 26 relief appearances for the Pirates down the stretch, Beeks recorded a 3.92 ERA with 17 strikeouts and one save 20 2/3 innings pitched.

=== Arizona Diamondbacks ===
On March 7, 2025, Beeks signed a minor league contract with the Houston Astros. He was released prior to the start of the season on March 22.

On March 26, 2025, Beeks signed a one-year, $1.25 million contract with the Arizona Diamondbacks. Beeks made 61 appearances (including two starts) for the Diamondbacks, accumulating a 5–3 record and 3.77 ERA with 47 strikeouts and one save across 57 1/3 innings pitched.

=== Texas Rangers ===
On March 13, 2026, Beeks signed a one-year, $1.6 million contract with the Texas Rangers. He made 29 appearances for the Rangers, compiling a 2–1 record and 3.81 ERA with 21 strikeouts over 26 innings of work. On July 4, it was announced that Beeks would require season–ending surgery to repair a flexor tendon strain.

== Personal life ==
Beeks and his wife, Brie, have a son and two daughters. The family resides in Northwest Arkansas.
