= Michael Pérez =

Puerto Rican baseball player (born 1992)

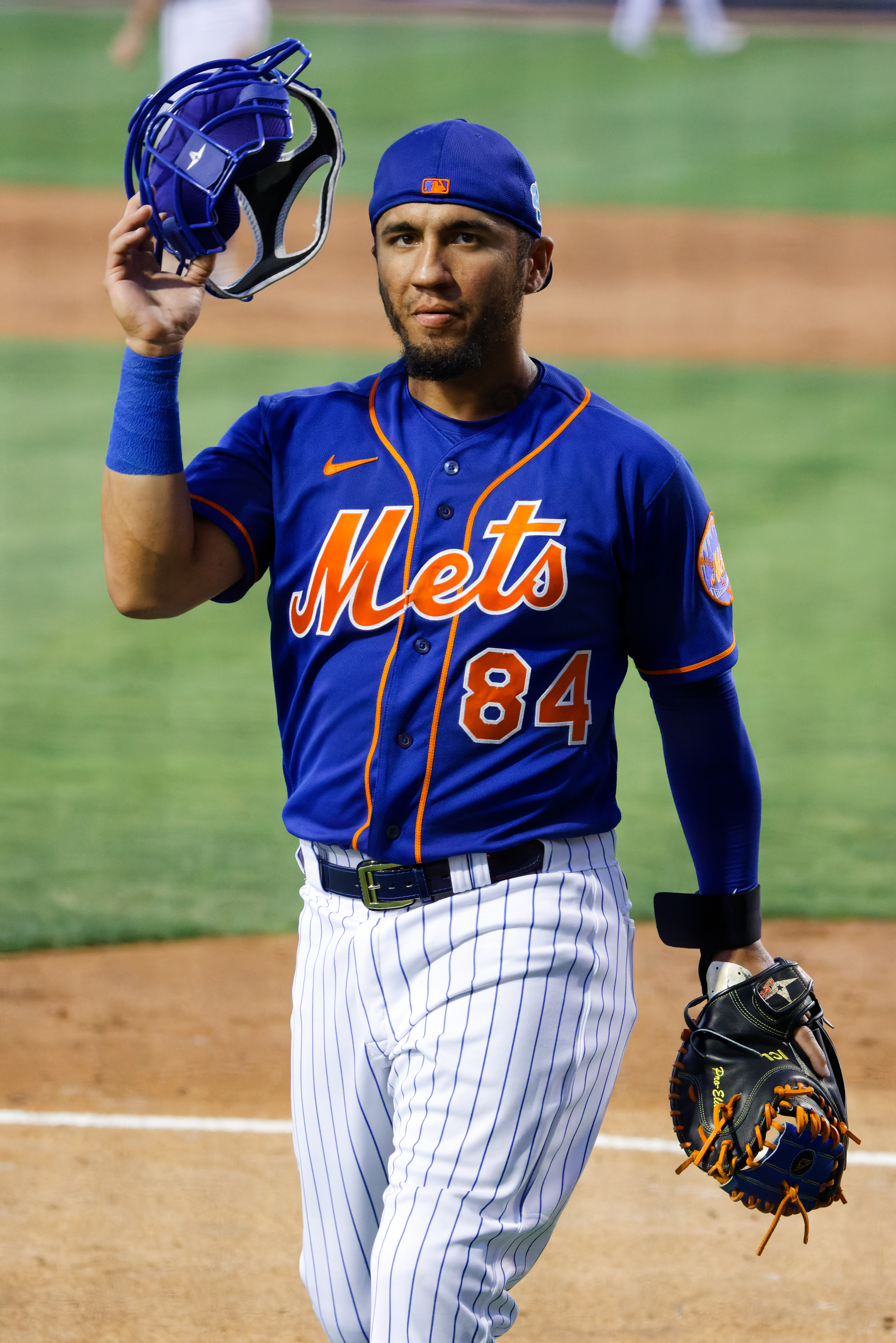
- Pérez with the Mets in 2023

Free agent
- Catcher
- Born: August 7, 1992 (age 34); Bayamón, Puerto Rico
- Bats: Left Throws: Right

MLB debut
- July 26, 2018, for the Tampa Bay Rays

MLB statistics (through 2023 season)
- Batting average: .179
- Home runs: 15
- Runs batted in: 61
- Stats at Baseball Reference

Teams
- Tampa Bay Rays (2018–2020); Pittsburgh Pirates (2021–2022); New York Mets (2022–2023)

Michael Pérez (born August 7, 1992) is a Puerto Rican professional baseball catcher who is a free agent. He has previously played in Major League Baseball (MLB) for the Tampa Bay Rays, Pittsburgh Pirates, and New York Mets.

== Career ==
Pérez attended the Colegio Vocacional Para Adultos in San Juan, Puerto Rico.

=== Arizona Diamondbacks ===
The Arizona Diamondbacks selected Pérez in the fifth round of the 2011 Major League Baseball draft. Pérez played for the Diamondbacks organization for eight years, reaching Triple-A.

=== Tampa Bay Rays ===
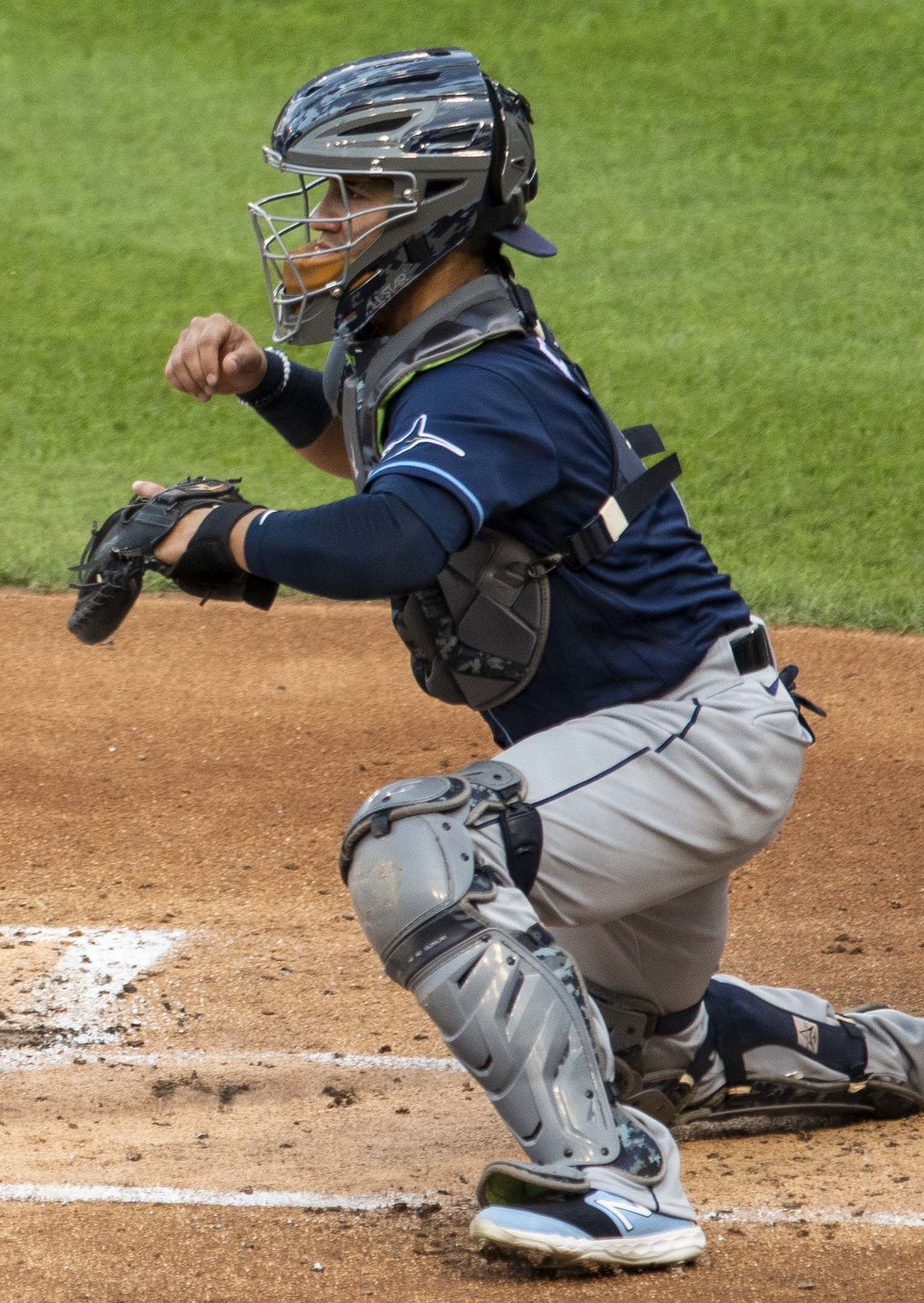
Pérez with the Rays in 2020

On July 25, 2018, the Diamondbacks traded Pérez and Brian Shaffer to the Tampa Bay Rays for Matt Andriese. With Wilson Ramos injured, the Rays promoted him to the major leagues the same day, and he made his major league debut the next day against the Baltimore Orioles. He got his first hit, a double, off of Alex Cobb that night. On August 31, Perez was placed on the 10-day disabled list with a strained left hamstring and would not play for the remainder of the season. Perez ended the season slashing .284/.304/.392 with one home run and 11 runs batted in. Over the next two seasons, Pérez slashed .185/.277/.269 over 60 games.

=== Pittsburgh Pirates ===
On October 30, 2020, the Pittsburgh Pirates claimed Pérez off of waivers. Pérez played in 70 games for Pittsburgh in 2021, hitting just .143/.221/.290 with 7 home runs and 21 RBI. The Pirates designated Pérez for assignment after the season on November 19, 2021. Pérez cleared waivers on November 24, and was assigned outright to the Triple-A Indianapolis Indians.

The Pirates promoted Pérez back to the major leagues on May 7, 2022. On June 30, Pérez hit three home runs in a game against the Milwaukee Brewers. It was his first career game with multiple home runs, as he went 4-for-4 with 5 RBI. He was designated for assignment on July 22.

=== New York Mets ===
Pérez was traded to the New York Mets on July 23, 2022, in exchange for cash considerations. He made his Mets debut as a mid-game defensive replacement on August 15, as James McCann moved from catcher to first base. Perez collected his first hit as a Met on August 20, a 2-RBI single against the Philadelphia Phillies. In 6 games for New York, Pérez went 2-for-14 (.143) with 3 RBI and 2 walks. Following the season, Pérez was designated for assignment on October 7. He cleared waivers and was sent outright to Triple–A on October 11. He elected free agency following the season on November 10.

On January 26, 2023, Pérez re-signed with the Mets organization on a minor league contract. He played in 19 games for the Triple-A Syracuse Mets, hitting .153/.261/.254 with 2 home runs and 6 RBI. On May 10, his contract was selected to the active roster. In his season debut, Pérez became only the third Met in franchise history (Xavier Nady and Darryl Strawberry) to go 4-for-4 in his first game of the season. He played in only three games for the Mets on the year, going 4–for–8 (.500). Following the season on October 20, Pérez was removed from the 40–man roster and sent outright to Triple–A Syracuse, but refused the assignment and elected free agency on October 24.

=== Baltimore Orioles ===
On December 30, 2023, Pérez signed a minor league contract with the Baltimore Orioles. In 21 games for the Triple–A Norfolk Tides, he batted .221/.294/.325 with two home runs and 13 RBI.

=== Seattle Mariners ===
On May 22, 2024, Pérez and Mike Baumann were traded to the Seattle Mariners in exchange for Blake Hunt. In 16 games for the Triple–A Tacoma Rainiers, he batted .177/.300/.392 with three home runs and eight RBI. Pérez was released by the Mariners organization on July 9.

=== Arizona Diamondbacks (second stint) ===
On July 31, 2024, Pérez signed a minor league contract with the Arizona Diamondbacks. In 24 appearances for the Triple-A Reno Aces, he batted .354/.444/.622 with four home runs and 13 RBI. Perez elected free agency following the season on November 4.

On May 5, 2025, Pérez re-signed with the Diamondbacks on a minor league contract. In 19 appearances for Reno, he slashed .273/.351/.424 with two home runs and nine RBI. Pérez was released by the Diamondbacks organization on June 14.

== See also ==
- List of Major League Baseball players from Puerto Rico
