= Mike Brosseau =

American baseball player (born 1994)

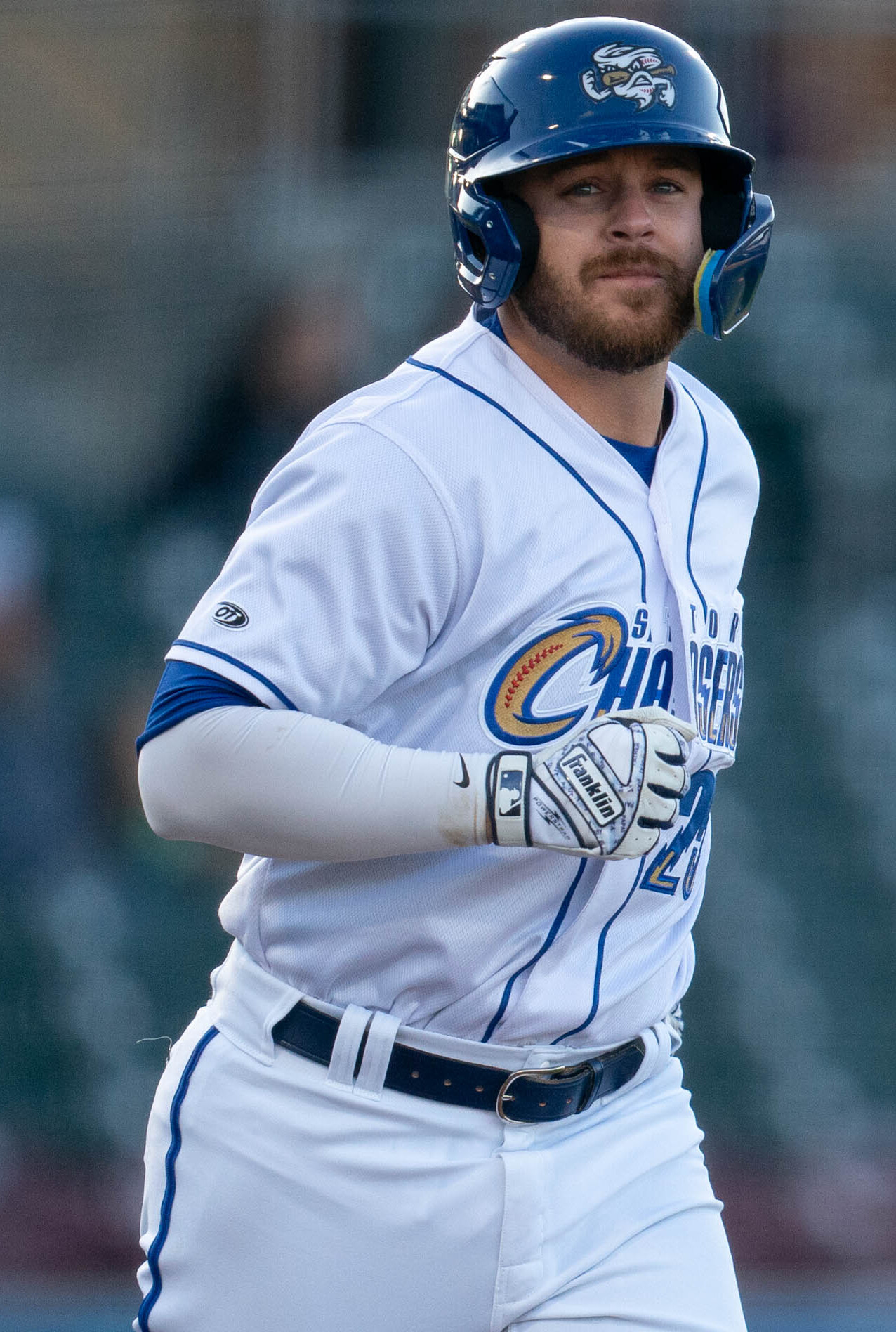
- Bosseau with the Omaha Storm Chasers in 2024

Free agent
- Utility player
- Born: March 15, 1994 (age 32); Munster, Indiana, U.S.
- Bats: Right Throws: Right

Professional debut
- MLB: June 23, 2019, for the Tampa Bay Rays
- NPB: August 1, 2023, for the Chiba Lotte Marines

MLB statistics (through 2023 season)
- Batting average: .242
- Home runs: 26
- Runs batted in: 77

NPB statistics (through 2023 season)
- Batting average: .191
- Home runs: 1
- Runs batted in: 11
- Stats at Baseball Reference

Teams
- Tampa Bay Rays (2019–2021); Milwaukee Brewers (2022–2023); Chiba Lotte Marines (2023)

Michael Dillon Brosseau (born March 15, 1994) is an American professional baseball infielder who is a free agent. He has previously played in Major League Baseball (MLB) for the Tampa Bay Rays, Milwaukee Brewers, and in Nippon Professional Baseball (NPB) for the Chiba Lotte Marines. He made his MLB debut in 2019.

== Amateur career ==
Brosseau attended Andrean High School in Merrillville, Indiana, where he was teammates with Sean Manaea. He attended Oakland University in Rochester Hills, Michigan, for four years (2013–2016).

== Professional career ==
=== Tampa Bay Rays ===
Brosseau went undrafted in the 2016 Major League Baseball draft and signed a free agent contract with the Tampa Bay Rays on June 23, 2016. Brosseau's professional career started with the Gulf Coast League Rays. After an impressive start, Brosseau was promoted to the Bowling Green Hot Rods for the 2017 season, where he led the Midwest League in average (.318) and on-base percentage (.393). Following another impressive stint, he earned a call-up to the Charlotte Stone Crabs of the Florida State League, which is in High-A baseball. For the 2018 season, Brosseau played for the Montgomery Biscuits of the Southern League, the Double-A affiliate of the Rays. To begin the 2019 season, Brosseau earned promotion to the Rays’ Triple-A affiliate, the Durham Bulls. Before being called up to the majors, Brosseau was leading the Bulls and the International League in RBI with 57.

On June 22, 2019, the Rays promoted Brosseau to the major leagues. On June 23, 2019, Brosseau made his major league debut going 1–5 with a single in his first at-bat. On July 3, in a 6–9 loss to the Baltimore Orioles, Brosseau recorded his first career home run. On July 13, Brosseau recorded his first multi-home-run game. On July 22, Brosseau pitched an inning against the Boston Red Sox, giving up one run in a loss.

On August 15, 2020, Brosseau pitched against the Toronto Blue Jays and recorded his first career strikeout against Randal Grichuk. Offensively, he finished the shortened season hitting .302/.378/.558 with five home runs and 12 RBIs in 86 at bats. On September 1, Brosseau was batting against the New York Yankees' Aroldis Chapman when a pitch thrown by Chapman narrowly missed his head. Chapman was suspended three games for the incident, though he denied he had aimed at Brosseau intentionally. Brosseau faced Chapman again in the fifth game of the 2020 American League Division Series, and hit a series-winning home run.

Brosseau spent most of 2021 between the Rays and the Durham Bulls. In 57 games, he batted .187 with five home runs and 18 runs batted in.

=== Milwaukee Brewers ===
On November 13, 2021, the Rays traded Brosseau to the Milwaukee Brewers for pitcher Evan Reifert.

In 69 games with Milwaukee in 2022, he batted .255/.344/.418 with 6 home runs and 23 RBIs. He played mostly third base, also appearing at shortstop, first base, and pitched three times. It was his first season that he didn't play in the outfield.

Brosseau played in 29 games for Milwaukee in 2023, and hit .205/.256/.397 with 4 home runs and 8 RBI. On July 5, he was designated for assignment by the Brewers following the promotion of J. C. Mejía. He cleared waivers and was sent outright to the Triple–A Nashville Sounds on July 9.

=== Chiba Lotte Marines ===
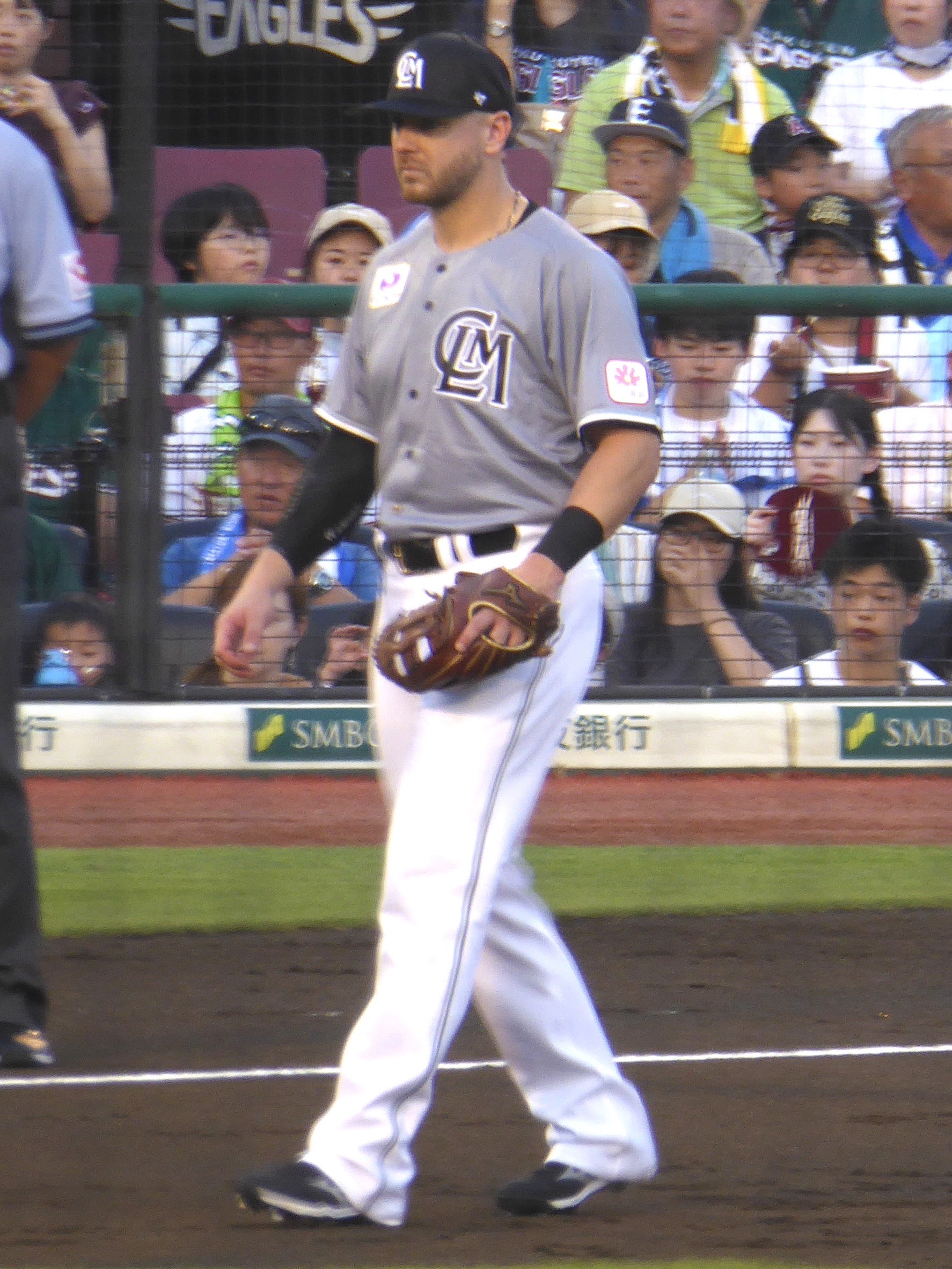
Brosseau with the Chiba Lotte Marines

On July 29, 2023, Brosseau signed with the Chiba Lotte Marines of Nippon Professional Baseball (NPB). In 37 games for the Marines, he batted .191/.218/.287 with one home run and 11 RBI.

=== Kansas City Royals ===
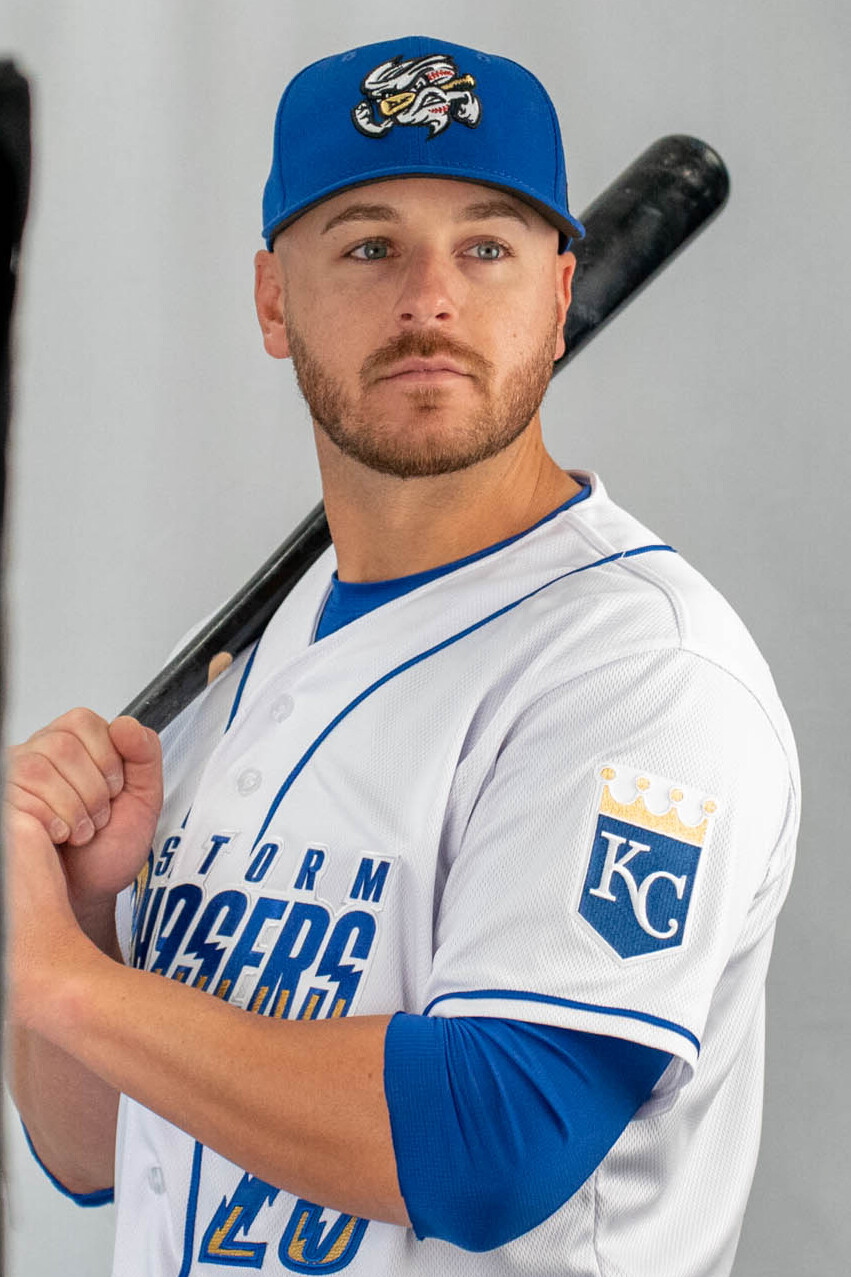
Brosseau with Omaha

On December 7, 2023, Brosseau signed a minor league contract with the Kansas City Royals. In 9 games for the Triple-A Omaha Storm Chasers, he went 3–for–28 (.107) with no home runs and three RBI. On April 24, 2024, Brosseau was released by the Royals organization.

=== New York Mets ===
On April 30, 2024, Brosseau signed a minor league contract with the New York Mets. In 93 games for the Triple–A Syracuse Mets, he batted .276/.368/.441 with 15 home runs and 41 RBI. Brosseau elected free agency following the season on November 4.

=== San Diego Padres ===
On December 28, 2024, Brosseau signed a minor league contract with the San Diego Padres. He made 86 appearances for the Triple-A El Paso Chihuahuas, slashing .222/.308/.358 with nine home runs, 39 RBI, and six stolen bases. Brosseau was released by the Padres organization on August 8, 2025.
