= 2019 Kansas City Royals season =

51st season in franchise history, final under ownership of David Glass

2019 Kansas City Royals
- League: American League
- Division: Central
- Ballpark: Kauffman Stadium
- City: Kansas City, Missouri
- Record: 59–103 (.364)
- Divisional place: 4th
- Owners: David Glass
- General managers: Dayton Moore
- Managers: Ned Yost
- Television: Fox Sports Kansas City (Ryan Lefebvre, Jeff Montgomery, Rex Hudler, Steve Physioc)
- Radio: KCSP 610 AM (Denny Matthews, Steve Stewart, Rex Hudler, Ryan Lefebvre, Steve Physioc, Jeff Montgomery)

The 2019 Kansas City Royals season was the 51st season for the franchise, and their 47th at Kauffman Stadium. They had a 1-game improvement from the previous season, but they were eliminated from postseason contention on August 27. The season was Ned Yost's final season as manager as he announced on September 23 that he was retiring at the end of the season.

== Season standings ==
=== American League Central ===
AL Central
| Team | W | L | Pct. | GB | Home | Road |
|---|---|---|---|---|---|---|
| Minnesota Twins | 101 | 61 | .623 | — | 46‍–‍35 | 55‍–‍26 |
| Cleveland Indians | 93 | 69 | .574 | 8 | 49‍–‍32 | 44‍–‍37 |
| Chicago White Sox | 72 | 89 | .447 | 28½ | 39‍–‍41 | 33‍–‍48 |
| Kansas City Royals | 59 | 103 | .364 | 42 | 31‍–‍50 | 28‍–‍53 |
| Detroit Tigers | 47 | 114 | .292 | 53½ | 22‍–‍59 | 25‍–‍55 |

=== American League Wild Card ===
Division leaders
| Team | W | L | Pct. |
|---|---|---|---|
| Houston Astros | 107 | 55 | .660 |
| New York Yankees | 103 | 59 | .636 |
| Minnesota Twins | 101 | 61 | .623 |

Wild Card teams (Top 2 teams qualify for postseason)
| Team | W | L | Pct. | GB |
|---|---|---|---|---|
| Oakland Athletics | 97 | 65 | .599 | +1 |
| Tampa Bay Rays | 96 | 66 | .593 | — |
| Cleveland Indians | 93 | 69 | .574 | 3 |
| Boston Red Sox | 84 | 78 | .519 | 12 |
| Texas Rangers | 78 | 84 | .481 | 18 |
| Chicago White Sox | 72 | 89 | .447 | 23½ |
| Los Angeles Angels | 72 | 90 | .444 | 24 |
| Seattle Mariners | 68 | 94 | .420 | 28 |
| Toronto Blue Jays | 67 | 95 | .414 | 29 |
| Kansas City Royals | 59 | 103 | .364 | 37 |
| Baltimore Orioles | 54 | 108 | .333 | 42 |
| Detroit Tigers | 47 | 114 | .292 | 48½ |

=== Record against opponents ===
2019 American League record Source: MLB Standings Grid – 2019
| Team | BAL | BOS | CWS | CLE | DET | HOU | KC | LAA | MIN | NYY | OAK | SEA | TB | TEX | TOR | NL |
|---|---|---|---|---|---|---|---|---|---|---|---|---|---|---|---|---|
| Baltimore | — | 7–12 | 3–3 | 3–4 | 3–4 | 2–4 | 3–3 | 4–3 | 0–6 | 2–17 | 1–6 | 3–4 | 7–12 | 1–6 | 8–11 | 7–13 |
| Boston | 12–7 | — | 5–2 | 3–3 | 5–2 | 2–4 | 5–1 | 4–3 | 3–3 | 5–14 | 4–3 | 4–3 | 7–12 | 4–3 | 11–8 | 10–10 |
| Chicago | 3–3 | 2–5 | — | 11–8 | 12–6 | 4–3 | 9–10 | 2–5 | 6–13 | 4–3 | 1–5 | 2–4 | 2–4 | 4–3 | 4–3 | 6–14 |
| Cleveland | 4–3 | 3–3 | 8–11 | — | 18–1 | 3–4 | 12–7 | 6–0 | 10–9 | 4–3 | 1–5 | 5–1 | 1–6 | 4–3 | 6–1 | 8–12 |
| Detroit | 4–3 | 2–5 | 6–12 | 1–18 | — | 1–6 | 10–9 | 3–3 | 5–14 | 3–3 | 1–6 | 1–6 | 2–4 | 0–6 | 3–4 | 5–15 |
| Houston | 4–2 | 4–2 | 3–4 | 4–3 | 6–1 | — | 5–1 | 14–5 | 3–4 | 4–3 | 11–8 | 18–1 | 3–4 | 13–6 | 4–2 | 11–9 |
| Kansas City | 3–3 | 1–5 | 10–9 | 7–12 | 9–10 | 1–5 | — | 2–4 | 5–14 | 2–5 | 2–5 | 2–5 | 3–4 | 2–5 | 1–6 | 9–11 |
| Los Angeles | 3–4 | 3–4 | 5–2 | 0–6 | 3–3 | 5–14 | 4–2 | — | 1–5 | 2–5 | 6–13 | 10–9 | 3–4 | 9–10 | 6–1 | 12–8 |
| Minnesota | 6–0 | 3–3 | 13–6 | 9–10 | 14–5 | 4–3 | 14–5 | 5–1 | — | 2–4 | 3–4 | 5–2 | 5–2 | 6–1 | 4–3 | 8–12 |
| New York | 17–2 | 14–5 | 3–4 | 3–4 | 3–3 | 3–4 | 5–2 | 5–2 | 4–2 | — | 2–4 | 6–1 | 12–7 | 3–3 | 11–8 | 12–8 |
| Oakland | 6–1 | 3–4 | 5–1 | 5–1 | 6–1 | 8–11 | 5–2 | 13–6 | 4–3 | 4–2 | — | 10–9 | 4–3 | 13–6 | 0–6 | 11–9 |
| Seattle | 4–3 | 3–4 | 4–2 | 1–5 | 6–1 | 1–18 | 5–2 | 9–10 | 2–5 | 1–6 | 9–10 | — | 2–4 | 8–11 | 4–2 | 9–11 |
| Tampa Bay | 12–7 | 12–7 | 4–2 | 6–1 | 4–2 | 4–3 | 4–3 | 4–3 | 2–5 | 7–12 | 3–4 | 4–2 | — | 3–3 | 13–6 | 14–6 |
| Texas | 6–1 | 3–4 | 3–4 | 3–4 | 6–0 | 6–13 | 5–2 | 10–9 | 1–6 | 3–3 | 6–13 | 11–8 | 3–3 | — | 3–3 | 9–11 |
| Toronto | 11–8 | 8–11 | 3–4 | 1–6 | 4–3 | 2–4 | 6–1 | 1–6 | 3–4 | 8–11 | 6–0 | 2–4 | 6–13 | 3–3 | — | 3–17 |

== Regular season ==
=== Game log ===
2019 game log: 59–103 (Home: 31–50; Away: 28–53)
March/April: 9–20 (Home: 6–10; Away: 3–10)

| # | Date | Opponent | Score | Win | Loss | Save | Attendance | Record | Streak |
|---|---|---|---|---|---|---|---|---|---|
| 1 | March 28 | White Sox | 5–3 | **Keller** (1–0) | Rodón (0–1) | **Boxberger** (1) | 31,675 | 1–0 | W1 |
| 2 | March 30 | White Sox | 8–6 | **Junis** (1–0) | López (0–1) | **Kennedy** (1) | 13,533 | 2–0 | W2 |
| 3 | March 31 | White Sox | 3–6 | Giolito (1–0) | **López** (0–1) | Colomé (1) | 12,669 | 2–1 | L1 |
| 4 | April 2 | Twins | 4–5 (10) | Hildenberger (1–0) | **Boxberger** (0–1) | Parker (1) | 10,024 | 2–2 | L2 |
| 5 | April 3 | Twins | 6–7 | May (1–0) | **Peralta** (0–1) | Parker (2) | 10,575 | 2–3 | L3 |
| 6 | April 4 | @ Tigers | 4–5 | Hardy (1–0) | **Zimmer** (0–1) | Greene (5) | 42,641 | 2–4 | L4 |
| 7 | April 6 | @ Tigers | 4–7 | Alcántara (2–0) | **McCarthy** (0–1) | Greene (6) | 22,111 | 2–5 | L5 |
| 8 | April 7 | @ Tigers | 1–3 | Ross (1–1) | **Keller** (1–1) | Greene (7) | 15,058 | 2–6 | L6 |
| 9 | April 8 | Mariners | 5–13 | Elías (1–0) | **Bailey** (0–1) | - | 10,259 | 2–7 | L7 |
| 10 | April 9 | Mariners | 3–6 | Gonzales (4–0) | **Junis** (1–1) | Swarzak (2) | 10,366 | 2–8 | L8 |
| 11 | April 10 | Mariners | 5–6 | Swarzak (1–0) | **Boxberger** (0–2) | Elías (2) | 12,775 | 2–9 | L9 |
| 12 | April 11 | Mariners | 6–7 (10) | Brennan (1–0) | **Sparkman** (0–1) | Sadzeck (1) | 10,231 | 2–10 | L10 |
| 13 | April 12 | Indians | 8–1 | **Keller** (2–1) | Carrasco (1–2) | - | 11,950 | 3–10 | W1 |
| 14 | April 13 | Indians | 3–0 | **Bailey** (1–1) | Rodríguez (0–1) | **Peralta** (1) | 15,188 | 4–10 | W2 |
| 15 | April 14 | Indians | 9–8 | **Peralta** (1–1) | Hand (0–1) | - | 14,303 | 5–10 | W3 |
| 16 | April 15 | @ White Sox | 4–5 | Bañuelos (1–0) | **Boxberger** (0–3) | Colomé (4) | 12,553 | 5–11 | L1 |
| 17 | April 16 | @ White Sox | 1–5 | López (1–2) | **López** (0–2) | - | 13,583 | 5–12 | L2 |
| 18 | April 17 | @ White Sox | 4–3(10) | **Peralta** (2–1) | Jones (0–1) | **Barlow** (1) | 14,358 | 6–12 | W1 |
| 19 | April 18 | @ Yankees | 6–1 | **Bailey** (2–1) | Germán (3–1) | - | 39,106 | 7–12 | W2 |
| 20 | April 19 | @ Yankees | 2–6 | Sabathia (1–0) | **Junis** (1–2) | - | 39,668 | 7–13 | L1 |
| 21 | April 20 | @ Yankees | 2–9 | Tanaka (2–1) | **Fillmyer** (0–1) | - | 42,013 | 7–14 | L2 |
| 22 | April 21 | @ Yankees | 6–7(10) | Britton (1–0) | **Diekman** (0–1) | - | 40,523 | 7–15 | L3 |
| 23 | April 22 | @ Rays | 3–6 | Font (1–0) | **Keller** (2–2) | Pagan (1) | 9,914 | 7–16 | L4 |
| 24 | April 23 | @ Rays | 2–5 | Beeks (1–0) | **Bailey** (2–2) | Pagan (2) | 8,298 | 7–17 | L5 |
| 25 | April 24 | @ Rays | 10–2 | **Junis** (2–2) | Snell (2–2) | - | 9,502 | 8–17 | W1 |
| 26 | April 26 | Angels | 1–5 | Skaggs (2–2) | **Duffy** (0–1) | - | 23,186 | 8–18 | L1 |
| 27 | April 27 | Angels | 9–4 | **Barlow** (1–0) | Barría (2–2) | - | 18,755 | 9–18 | W1 |
| 28 | April 28 | Angels | 3–7 | Harvey (1–2) | **Bailey** (2–3) | - | 21,549 | 9–19 | L1 |
| 29 | April 29 | Rays | 5–8 | Chirinos (4–0) | **Keller** (2–3) | - | 11,744 | 9–20 | L2 |
| — | April 30 | Rays | Postponed (Rain); Makeup: May 1 | | | | | | |

May: 10–18 (Home: 5–7; Away: 5–11)

| # | Date | Opponent | Score | Win | Loss | Save | Attendance | Record | Streak |
|---|---|---|---|---|---|---|---|---|---|
| 30 | May 1 | Rays | 3–2 | **Junis** (3–2) | Stanek (0–1) | **Kennedy** (2) | - | 10–20 | W1 |
| 31 | May 1 | Rays | 8–2 | **Sparkman** (1–1) | Snell (2–3) | - | 11,411 | 11–20 | W2 |
| 32 | May 2 | Rays | 1–3 | Kolarek (2–0) | **Peralta** (2–2) | Castillo (4) | 23,343 | 11–21 | L1 |
| 33 | May 3 | @ Tigers | 3–4 | Boyd (3–2) | **López** (0–3) | Greene (13) | 14,020 | 11–22 | L2 |
| 34 | May 4 | @ Tigers | 15–3 | **Bailey** (3–3) | Ross (1–4) | - | 19,500 | 12–22 | W1 |
| 35 | May 5 | @ Tigers | 2–5 (10) | Farmer (2–2) | **Kennedy** (0–1) | - | 16,369 | 12–23 | L1 |
| 36 | May 6 | @ Astros | 4–6 | Cole (3–4) | **Junis** (3–3) | Osuna (8) | 27,079 | 12–24 | L2 |
| 37 | May 7 | @ Astros | 12–2 | **Duffy** (1–1) | McHugh (3–4) | - | 30,377 | 13–24 | W1 |
| 38 | May 8 | @ Astros | 0–9 | Peacock (3–2) | **López** (0–4) | - | 22,698 | 13–25 | L1 |
| 39 | May 10 | Phillies | 5–1 | **Bailey** (4–3) | Arrieta (4–3) | - | 20,015 | 14–25 | W1 |
| 40 | May 11 | Phillies | 0–7 | Eflin (5–3) | **Keller** (2–4) | - | 24,463 | 14–26 | L1 |
| 41 | May 12 | Phillies | 1–6 | Irvin (1–0) | **Junis** (3–4) | - | 19,640 | 14–27 | L2 |
| 42 | May 14 | Rangers | 11–5 | **Duffy** (2–1) | Miller (1–3) | - | 19,410 | 15–27 | W1 |
| 43 | May 15 | Rangers | 1–6 | Minor (4–3) | **López** (0–5) | - | 14,572 | 15–28 | L1 |
| 44 | May 16 | Rangers | 1–16 | Lynn (5–3) | **Bailey** (4–4) | - | 17,469 | 15–29 | L2 |
| 45 | May 17 | @ Angels | 2–5 | Harvey (2–3) | **Keller** (2–5) | Robles (5) | 43,444 | 15–30 | L3 |
| 46 | May 18 | @ Angels | 3–6 | Canning (2–1) | **Junis** (3–5) | Buttrey (2) | 43,415 | 15–31 | L4 |
| 47 | May 19 | @ Angels | 5–1 | **Duffy** (3–1) | Skaggs (4–4) | - | 43,329 | 16–31 | W1 |
| 48 | May 21 | @ Cardinals | Postponed (rain); Makeup:May 22 | | | | | | |
| 48 | May 22 | @ Cardinals | 8–2 | **Keller** (3–5) | Wacha (3–2) | - | 42,275 | 17–31 | W2 |
| 49 | May 22 | @ Cardinals | 3–10 | Wainwright (4–4) | **Bailey** (4–5) | - | 42,529 | 17–32 | L1 |
| 50 | May 24 | Yankees | Postponed (rain); Makeup:May25 | | | | | | |
| 50 | May 25 | Yankees | 3–7 | Happ (4–3) | **Barlow** (1–1) | - | 25,243 | 17–33 | L2 |
| 51 | May 25 | Yankees | 5–6 | Adams (1–0) | **López** (0–6) | Chapman (14) | 18,599 | 17–34 | L3 |
| 52 | May 26 | Yankees | 8–7 (10) | **McCarthy** (1–1) | Holder (3–2) | — | 21,499 | 18–34 | W1 |
| 53 | May 27 | @ White Sox | Suspended (inclement weather); Continuation scheduled for May 28 | | | | | | |
| 53 | May 28 | @ White Sox | 1–2 | Colomé (2–0) | **Diekman** (0–2) | — | 13,842 | 18–35 | L1 |
| 54 | May 28 | @ White Sox | 3–4 | Giolito (7–1) | **Keller** (3–6) | Colomé (10) | 13,842 | 18–36 | L2 |
| 55 | May 29 | @ White Sox | 7–8 | Herrera (2–3) | **Kennedy** (0–2) | Colomé (11) | 16,167 | 18–37 | L3 |
| 56 | May 30 | @ Rangers | 4–2 | **Junis** (4–5) | Minor (5–4) | **Kennedy** (3) | 26,202 | 19–37 | W1 |
| 57 | May 31 | @ Rangers | 2–6 | Jurado (2–2) | **Duffy** (3–2) | - | 31,183 | 19–38 | L1 |

June: 10–17 (Home: 5–8; Away: 5–9)

| # | Date | Opponent | Score | Win | Loss | Save | Attendance | Record | Streak |
|---|---|---|---|---|---|---|---|---|---|
| 58 | June 1 | @ Rangers | 2–6 | Lynn (7–4) | **Bailey** (4–6) | - | 27,133 | 19–39 | L2 |
| 59 | June 2 | @ Rangers | 1–5 | Sampson (4–3) | **Keller** (3–7) | - | 21,891 | 19–40 | L3 |
| 60 | June 4 | Red Sox | 3–8 | Rodríguez (6–3) | **Barlow** (1–2) | - | 13,184 | 19–41 | L4 |
| 61 | June 5 | Red Sox | 0–8 | Sale (2–7) | **Junis** (4–6) | - | 15,523 | 19–42 | L5 |
| 62 | June 6 | Red Sox | 5–7 | Brewer (1–2) | **Duffy** (3–3) | Barnes (4) | 19,928 | 19–43 | L6 |
| 63 | June 7 | White Sox | 6–4 | **Boxberger** (1–3) | Fry (1–2) | **Kennedy** (4) | 24,744 | 20–43 | W1 |
| 64 | June 8 | White Sox | 0–2 | Giolito (9–1) | **Keller** (3–8) | Colomé (13) | 20,889 | 20–44 | L1 |
| 65 | June 9 | White Sox | 2–5 | López (4–6) | **Sparkman** (1–2) | - | 22,501 | 20–45 | L2 |
| 66 | June 11 | Tigers | 3–2 | **Barlow** (2–2) | Alcántara (2–1) | **Kennedy** (5) | 20,776 | 21–45 | W1 |
| 67 | June 12 | Tigers | 2–3 | Ramirez (3–0) | **Diekman** (0–3) | Greene (20) | 19,870 | 21–46 | L1 |
| 68 | June 13 | Tigers (Game played in Omaha) | 7–3 | **Bailey** (5–6) | Boyd (5–5) | **Kennedy** (6) | 25,454 | 22–46 | W1 |
| 69 | June 14 | @ Twins | 0–2 | Gibson (7–3) | **Diekman** (0–4) | Rogers (7) | 38,898 | 22–47 | L1 |
| 70 | June 15 | @ Twins | 4–5 | Odorizzi (10–2) | **Sparkman** (1–3) | Rogers (8) | 39,267 | 22–48 | L2 |
| 71 | June 16 | @ Twins | 8–6 | **López** (1–6) | Pérez (7–3) | **Kennedy** (7) | 38,886 | 23–48 | W1 |
| 72 | June 17 | @ Mariners | 6–4 | **Flynn** (1–0) | Bass (1–2) | **Kennedy** (8) | 14,476 | 24–48 | W2 |
| 73 | June 18 | @ Mariners | 9–0 | **Bailey** (6–6) | Kikuchi (3–5) | - | 12,697 | 25–48 | W3 |
| 74 | June 19 | @ Mariners | 8–2 | Gonzales (8–6) | **Keller** (3–9) | - | 16,228 | 25–49 | L1 |
| 75 | June 20 | Twins | 4–1 | **Sparkman** (2–3) | Odorizzi (10–3) | **Kennedy** (9) | 22,683 | 26–49 | W1 |
| 76 | June 21 | Twins | 7–8 | Harper (3–0) | **Diekman** (0–5) | Rogers (9) | 27,418 | 26–50 | L1 |
| 77 | June 22 | Twins | 3–5 (10) | May (2–1) | **Peralta** (2–3) | Parker (10) | 28,504 | 26–51 | L2 |
| 78 | June 23 | Twins | 6–1 | **Bailey** (7–6) | Pineda (4–4) | **McCarthy** (1) | 21,257 | 27–51 | W1 |
| 79 | June 24 | @ Indians | 2–3 | Hand (4–2) | **Peralta** (2–4) | - | 15,413 | 27–52 | L1 |
| 80 | June 25 | @ Indians | 8–6 | **McCarthy** (2–1) | Hand (4–3) | **Kennedy** (10) | 21,766 | 28–52 | W1 |
| 81 | June 26 | @ Indians | 3–5 | Bauer (6–6) | **Junis** (4–7) | - | 22,246 | 28–53 | L1 |
| 82 | June 28 | @ Blue Jays | 2–6 | Hudson (4–2) | **Duffy** (3–4) | - | 18,399 | 28–54 | L2 |
| 83 | June 29 | @ Blue Jays | 5–7 | Hudson (5–2) | **Barlow** (2–3) | - | 24,906 | 28–55 | L3 |
| 84 | June 30 | @ Blue Jays | 7–6 | **Keller** (4–9) | Sanchez (3–11) | **Kennedy** (11) | 21,727 | 29–55 | W1 |

July: 11–15 (Home: 7–10; Away: 4–5)

| # | Date | Opponent | Score | Win | Loss | Save | Attendance | Record | Streak |
|---|---|---|---|---|---|---|---|---|---|
| 85 | July 1 | @Blue Jays | 3–11 | Richard (1–4) | **Sparkman** (2–4) | - | 29,339 | 29–56 | L1 |
| 86 | July 2 | Indians | 5–9 | Bauer (7–6) | **Junis** (4–8) | - | 18,934 | 29–57 | L2 |
| 87 | July 3 | Indians | 0–4 | Clevinger (2–2) | **Duffy** (3–5) | - | 25,049 | 29–58 | L3 |
| 88 | July 4 | Indians | 4–8 | Cimber (4–2) | **López** (1–7) | - | 18,076 | 29–59 | L4 |
| 89 | July 5 | @Nationals | 7–4 (11) | **Flynn** (2–0) | Venters (0–1) | **Peralta** (2) | 25,213 | 30–59 | W1 |
| 90 | July 6 | @Nationals | 0–6 | Scherzer (9–5) | **Sparkman** (2–5) | - | 27,863 | 30–60 | L1 |
| 91 | July 7 | @Nationals | 2–5 | Doolittle (6–2) | **Diekman** (0–6) | - | 21,873 | 30–61 | L2 |
**90th All-Star Game in Cleveland, OH**
| 92 | July 12 | Tigers | 8–5 | **Newberry** (1–0) | Hardy (1–1) | **Kennedy** (12) | 25,059 | 31–61 | W1 |
| 93 | July 13 | Tigers | 4–1 | **Keller** (5–9) | Boyd (6–7) | **Kennedy** (13) | 27,551 | 32–61 | W2 |
| 94 | July 14 | Tigers | 8–12 | Ramirez (4–3) | **Flynn** (2–1) | — | 13,763 | 32–62 | L1 |
| 95 | July 15 | White Sox | 5–2 | **Junis** (5–8) | Giolito (11–4) | **Kennedy** (14) | 16,006 | 33–62 | W1 |
| 96 | July 16 | White Sox | 11–0 | **Sparkman** (3–5) | Cease (1–1) | - | 16,557 | 34–62 | W2 |
| 97 | July 17 | White Sox | 7–5 | **Duffy** (4–5) | Nova (4–9) | **Kennedy** (15) | 14,340 | 35–62 | W3 |
| 98 | July 18 | White Sox | 6–5 | **Keller** (6–9) | Detwiler (1–1) | **Kennedy** (16) | 13,157 | 36–62 | W4 |
| 99 | July 19 | @ Indians | 5–10 | Bieber (9–3) | **Montgomery** (1–3) | - | 26,640 | 36–63 | L1 |
| 100 | July 20 | @ Indians | 1–0 | **Junis** (6–8) | Plutko (3–2) | **Kennedy** (17) | 31,958 | 37–63 | W1 |
| 101 | July 21 | @ Indians | 4–5 | Plesac (4–3) | **Sparkman** (3–6) | Hand (27) | 23,564 | 37–64 | L1 |
| 102 | July 23 | @ Braves | 5–4 | **Hill** (1–0) | Swarzak (2–3) | **Kennedy** (18) | 36,570 | 38–64 | W1 |
| 103 | July 24 | @ Braves | 2–0 | **Keller** (7–9) | Teherán (5–7) | **Kennedy** (19) | 38,865 | 39–64 | W2 |
| 104 | July 25 | Indians | 4–5 (14) | Goody (2–0) | **Flynn** (2–2) | Cole (1) | 15,224 | 39–65 | L1 |
| 105 | July 26 | Indians | 3–8 | Plesac (5–3) | **Junis** (6–9) | - | 26,609 | 39–66 | L2 |
| 106 | July 27 | Indians | 1–9 | Clevinger (5–2) | **Sparkman** (3–7) | - | 31,181 | 39–67 | L3 |
| 107 | July 28 | Indians | 9–6 | **Duffy** (5–5) | Bauer (9–8) | **Kennedy** (20) | 14,380 | 40–67 | W1 |
| 108 | July 29 | Blue Jays | 3–7 | Mayza (1–1) | **Keller** (7–10) | - | 18,306 | 40–68 | L1 |
| 109 | July 30 | Blue Jays | 2–9 | Reid-Foley (1–1) | **Montgomery** (1–4) | - | 18,379 | 40–69 | L2 |
| 110 | July 31 | Blue Jays | 1–4 | Waguespack (2–1) | **Junis** (6–10) | Shafer (1) | 14,480 | 40–70 | L3 |

August: 8–19 (Home: 3–8; Away: 5–11)

| # | Date | Opponent | Score | Win | Loss | Save | Attendance | Record | Streak |
|---|---|---|---|---|---|---|---|---|---|
| 111 | August 2 | @ Twins | 9–11 | May (4–3) | **Lovelady** (0–1) | Romo (18) | 32,341 | 40–71 | L4 |
| 112 | August 3 | @ Twins | 3–11 | Gibson (11–4) | **Duffy** (5–6) | - | 36,823 | 40–72 | L5 |
| 113 | August 4 | @ Twins | 0–3 | Smeltzer (1–1) | **Keller** (7–11) | Rogers (17) | 30,171 | 40–73 | L6 |
| 114 | August 5 | @ Red Sox | 5–7 | Porcello (10–8) | **Montgomery** (1–5) | Workman (6) | 33,636 | 40–74 | L7 |
| 115 | August 6 | @ Red Sox | 6–2 | **Junis** (7–10) | Cashner (10–7) | - | 36,360 | 41–74 | W1 |
| — | August 7 | @ Red Sox | Suspended (rain). Score 4–4, top of 10th. To be resumed on August 22. | | | | | | |
| 116 | August 8 | @ Tigers | 8–10 | Jiménez (3–6) | **Lovelady** (0–2) | - | 17,197 | 41–75 | L1 |
| 117 | August 9 | @ Tigers | 2–5 | Jackson (2–5) | **Keller** (7–12) | Jiménez (1) | 21,475 | 41–76 | L2 |
| 118 | August 10 | @ Tigers | 7–0 | **Montgomery** (2–5) | Turnbull (3–10) | - | 26,028 | 42–76 | W1 |
| 119 | August 11 | @ Tigers | 10–2 | **Junis** (8–10) | Norris (3–10) | - | 19,790 | 43–76 | W2 |
| 120 | August 13 | Cardinals | 0–2 | Flaherty (6–6) | **Sparkman** (3–8) | Martínez (13) | 23,563 | 43–77 | L1 |
| 121 | August 14 | Cardinals | 0–6 | Hudson (11–6) | **Keller** (7–13) | - | 22,494 | 43–78 | L2 |
| 122 | August 16 | Mets | 4–1 | **Montgomery** (3–5) | Syndergaard (8–6) | Kennedy (21) | 21,439 | 44–78 | W1 |
| 123 | August 17 | Mets | 1–4 | deGrom (8–7) | **Junis** (8–11) | Lugo (3) | 28,697 | 44–79 | L1 |
| 124 | August 18 | Mets | 5–11 | Familia (4–1) | **McCarthy** (2–2) | - | 20,661 | 44–80 | L2 |
| 125 | August 19 | @ Orioles | 5–4 | **López** (2–7) | Means (8–9) | **Kennedy** (22) | 11,659 | 45–80 | W1 |
| 126 | August 20 | @ Orioles | 1–4 | Harvey (1–0) | **Barnes** (1–2) | Givens (10) | 11,826 | 45–81 | L1 |
| 127 | August 21 | @ Orioles | 1–8 | Brooks (3–7) | **Montgomery** (3–6) | - | 9,872 | 45–82 | L2 |
| 128 | August 22 | @ Red Sox | 4–5 (10) | Taylor (1–1) | **Lovelady** (0–3) | - | 32,453 | 45–83 | L3 |
| 129 | August 23 | @ Indians | 1–4 | Plesac (7–4) | **Junis** (8–12) | Hand (30) | 31,946 | 45–84 | L4 |
| 130 | August 24 | @ Indians | 2–4 | Clevinger (9–2) | **Sparkman** (3–9) | Hand (31) | 33,349 | 45–85 | L5 |
| 131 | August 25 | @ Indians | 9–8 (10) | **Kennedy** (1–2) | Goody (3–1) | **López** (1) | 29,360 | 46–85 | W1 |
| 132 | August 26 | A's | 4–19 | Bailey (12–8) | **Keller** (7–14) | - | 13,595 | 46–86 | L1 |
| 133 | August 27 | A's | 1–2 | Fiers (13–3) | **Montgomery** (3–7) | Hendriks (16) | 13,669 | 46–87 | L2 |
| 134 | August 28 | A's | 6–4 | **Hill** (2–0) | Treinen (6–5) | **Kennedy** (23) | 15,049 | 47–87 | W1 |
| 135 | August 29 | A's | 8–9 | Petit (4–3) | **Sparkman** (3–10) | Hendriks (17) | 13,844 | 47–88 | W2 |
| 136 | August 30 | Orioles | 2–14 | Means (10–9) | **Skoglund** (0–1) | - | 16,287 | 47–89 | L1 |
| 137 | August 31 | Orioles | 7–5 | **Barlow** (3–3) | Fry (1–6) | **Kennedy** (24) | 18,385 | 48–89 | W1 |

September: 11–14 (Home: 5–7; Away: 6–7)

| # | Date | Opponent | Score | Win | Loss | Save | Attendance | Record | Streak |
|---|---|---|---|---|---|---|---|---|---|
| 138 | September 1 | Orioles | 6–4 | **McCarthy** (3–2) | Fry (1–7) | **Kennedy** (25) | 18,208 | 49–89 | W2 |
| 139 | September 3 | Tigers | 6–5 | **Kennedy** (2–2) | Reininger (0–1) | - | 12,644 | 50–89 | W3 |
| 140 | September 4 | Tigers | 5–4 | **Junis** (9–12) | Jackson (3–9) | **Kennedy** (26) | 15,308 | 51–89 | W4 |
| 141 | September 5 | Tigers | 4–6 | Boyd (8–10) | **Sparkman** (3–11) | Jiménez (5) | 14,736 | 51–90 | L1 |
| 142 | September 6 | @ Marlins | 3–0 | **López** (3–7) | López (5–7) | **Kennedy** (27) | 8,915 | 52–90 | W1 |
| 143 | September 7 | @ Marlins | 7–2 | **Duffy** (6–6) | Conley (2–8) | **Hill** (1) | 13,112 | 53–90 | W2 |
| 144 | September 8 | @ Marlins | 0–9 | Alcántara (5–12) | **Montgomery** (3–8) | - | 10,934 | 53–91 | L1 |
| 145 | September 10 | @ White Sox | 3–7 | Nova (10–12) | **Junis** (9–13) | - | 15,196 | 53–92 | L2 |
| 146 | September 11 | @ White Sox | 8–6 | **Sparkman** (4–11) | López (9–13) | **Kennedy** (28) | 14,385 | 54–92 | W1 |
| 147 | September 12 | @ White Sox | 6–3 | **López** (4–7) | Giolito (14–9) | **Kennedy** (29) | 13,838 | 55–92 | W2 |
| 148 | September 13 | Astros | 1–4 | Cole (17–5) | **Fillmyer** (0–2) | Osuna (33) | 20,593 | 55–93 | L1 |
| 149 | September 14 | Astros | 1–6 | Greinke (16–5) | **Montgomery** (3–9) | - | 20,716 | 55–94 | L2 |
| 150 | September 15 | Astros | 3–12 | Miley (14–5) | **Junis** (9–14) | - | 17,205 | 55–95 | L3 |
| 151 | September 16 | @ A's | 6–5 | **McCarthy** (4–2) | Hendriks (4–3) | **Kennedy** (30) | 12,902 | 56–95 | W1 |
| 152 | September 17 | @ A's | 1–2 | Puk (2–0) | **López** (4–8) | Hendriks (23) | 14,992 | 56–96 | L1 |
| 153 | September 18 | @ A's | 0–1 (11) | Wendelken (3–1) | **Hahn** (0–1) | - | 16,714 | 56–97 | L2 |
| 154 | September 19 | @ Twins | 5–8 | Thorpe (3–2) | **Barnes** (1–3) | Rogers (28) | 24,565 | 56–98 | L3 |
| 155 | September 20 | @ Twins | 3–4 | Dobnak (1–1) | **Skoglund** (0–2) | May (2) | 29,468 | 56–99 | L4 |
| 156 | September 21 | @ Twins | 12–5 | **Rosario** (2–0) | Rogers (2–4) | - | 37,750 | 57–99 | W1 |
| 157 | September 22 | @ Twins | 8–12 | Littell (6–0) | **López** (4–9) | - | 31,628 | 57–100 | L1 |
| 158 | September 24 | Braves | 9–6 | **Duffy** (7–6) | Teherán (10–11) | - | 16,688 | 58–100 | W1 |
| 159 | September 25 | Braves | 2–10 | Jackson (9–2) | **Barnes** (1–4) | - | 16,931 | 58–101 | L1 |
| 160 | September 27 | Twins | 2–6 (7) | Berríos (14–8) | **Skoglund** (0–3) | - | 15,389 | 58–102 | L2 |
| 161 | September 28 | Twins | 3–4 | Duffey (5–1) | **Barnes** (1–5) | Rogers (30) | 21,995 | 58–103 | L3 |
| 162 | September 29 | Twins | 5–4 | **Kennedy** (3–2) | Graterol (1–1) | - | 17,875 | 59–103 | W1 |

Legend: = Win = Loss = Postponement
Bold = Royals team member

== Roster ==
2019 Kansas City Royals
Roster
| Pitchers: 21 Homer Bailey; 58 Scott Barlow; 50 Jacob Barnes; 26 Brad Boxberger; 40 Jake Diekman; 41 Danny Duffy; 51 Chris Ellis; 49 Heath Fillmyer; 33 Brian Flynn; 32 Jesse Hahn; 54 Tim Hill; 65 Jake Junis; 56 Brad Keller; 31 Ian Kennedy; 48 Ben Lively; 28 Jorge López; 55 Richard Lovelady; 61 Kevin McCarthy; 21 Mike Montgomery; 68 Jake Newberry; 43 Wily Peralta; 43 Randy Rosario; 53 Eric Skoglund; 57 Glenn Sparkman; 67 Gabe Speier; 63 Josh Staumont; 45 Kyle Zimmer | Catchers: 33 Nick Dini; 36 Cam Gallagher; 16 Martín Maldonado; 72 Meibrys Viloria; Infielders: 2 Humberto Arteaga; 19 Cheslor Cuthbert; 17 Hunter Dozier; 9 Lucas Duda; 47 Kelvin Gutiérrez; 1 Nicky Lopez; 15 Whit Merrifield; 27 Adalberto Mondesí; 66 Ryan O'Hearn; 2 Chris Owings; 25 Frank Schwindel | Outfielders: 38 Jorge Bonifacio; 4 Alex Gordon; 0 Terrance Gore; 6 Billy Hamilton; 9 Ryan McBroom; 26 Erick Mejia; 14 Brett Phillips; 12 Jorge Soler; 11 Bubba Starling | Manager: 3 Ned Yost; Coaches: 44 Terry Bradshaw (hitting); 80 Ryan Eigsti (bullpen catcher); 22 Cal Eldred (pitching); 7 Pedro Grifol (quality control / catching); 23 Mike Jirschele (third base); 24 Mitch Maier (first base); 46 Dale Sveum (bench); 18 Vance Wilson (bullpen) |

== Player stats ==
=== Batting ===
Note: G = Games played; AB = At bats; R = Runs; H = Hits; 2B = Doubles; 3B = Triples; HR = Home runs; RBI = Runs batted in; SB = Stolen bases; BB = Walks; AVG = Batting average; SLG = Slugging average

| Player | G | AB | R | H | 2B | 3B | HR | RBI | SB | BB | AVG | SLG |
|---|---|---|---|---|---|---|---|---|---|---|---|---|
| Whit Merrifield | 162 | 681 | 105 | 206 | 41 | 10 | 16 | 74 | 20 | 45 | .302 | .463 |
| Jorge Soler | 162 | 589 | 95 | 156 | 33 | 1 | 48 | 117 | 3 | 73 | .265 | .569 |
| Alex Gordon | 150 | 556 | 77 | 148 | 31 | 1 | 13 | 76 | 5 | 51 | .266 | .396 |
| Hunter Dozier | 139 | 523 | 75 | 146 | 29 | 10 | 26 | 84 | 2 | 55 | .279 | .522 |
| Adalberto Mondesí | 102 | 415 | 58 | 109 | 20 | 10 | 9 | 62 | 43 | 19 | .263 | .424 |
| Nicky Lopez | 103 | 379 | 44 | 91 | 22 | 2 | 2 | 30 | 1 | 18 | .240 | .325 |
| Ryan O'Hearn | 105 | 328 | 32 | 64 | 13 | 1 | 14 | 38 | 0 | 39 | .195 | .369 |
| Cheslor Cuthbert | 87 | 309 | 24 | 76 | 14 | 0 | 9 | 40 | 1 | 19 | .246 | .379 |
| Billy Hamilton | 93 | 275 | 32 | 58 | 12 | 2 | 0 | 12 | 18 | 25 | .211 | .269 |
| Martín Maldonado | 74 | 238 | 26 | 54 | 15 | 0 | 6 | 17 | 0 | 17 | .227 | .366 |
| Bubba Starling | 56 | 186 | 26 | 40 | 7 | 0 | 4 | 12 | 2 | 9 | .215 | .317 |
| Chris Owings | 40 | 135 | 9 | 18 | 4 | 1 | 2 | 9 | 4 | 8 | .133 | .222 |
| Meibrys Viloria | 42 | 133 | 7 | 28 | 7 | 0 | 1 | 15 | 0 | 10 | .211 | .286 |
| Cam Gallagher | 45 | 126 | 14 | 30 | 7 | 0 | 3 | 12 | 0 | 11 | .238 | .365 |
| Humberto Arteaga | 41 | 122 | 11 | 24 | 4 | 0 | 0 | 4 | 1 | 8 | .197 | .230 |
| Lucas Duda | 39 | 105 | 7 | 18 | 4 | 0 | 4 | 15 | 0 | 11 | .171 | .324 |
| Ryan McBroom | 23 | 75 | 8 | 22 | 5 | 0 | 0 | 6 | 0 | 7 | .293 | .360 |
| Kelvin Gutiérrez | 20 | 73 | 4 | 19 | 2 | 1 | 1 | 11 | 1 | 5 | .260 | .356 |
| Brett Phillips | 30 | 65 | 7 | 9 | 2 | 0 | 2 | 6 | 3 | 10 | .138 | .262 |
| Nick Dini | 20 | 56 | 11 | 11 | 3 | 0 | 2 | 6 | 0 | 4 | .196 | .357 |
| Terrance Gore | 37 | 51 | 13 | 14 | 2 | 1 | 0 | 1 | 13 | 6 | .275 | .353 |
| Erick Mejia | 9 | 22 | 3 | 5 | 1 | 0 | 0 | 4 | 0 | 4 | .227 | .273 |
| Jorge Bonifacio | 5 | 20 | 3 | 7 | 3 | 0 | 0 | 3 | 0 | 1 | .350 | .500 |
| Frank Schwindel | 6 | 15 | 0 | 1 | 0 | 0 | 0 | 0 | 0 | 0 | .067 | .067 |
| Pitcher totals | 162 | 19 | 0 | 2 | 0 | 0 | 0 | 1 | 0 | 1 | .105 | .105 |
| Team totals | 162 | 5496 | 691 | 1356 | 281 | 40 | 162 | 655 | 117 | 456 | .247 | .401 |

=== Pitching ===
Note: W = Wins; L = Losses; ERA = Earned run average; G = Games pitched; GS = Games started; SV = Saves; IP = Innings pitched; H = Hits allowed; R = Runs allowed; ER = Earned runs allowed; BB = Walks allowed; SO = Strikeouts

| Player | W | L | ERA | G | GS | SV | IP | H | R | ER | BB | SO |
|---|---|---|---|---|---|---|---|---|---|---|---|---|
| Jakob Junis | 9 | 14 | 5.24 | 31 | 31 | 0 | 175.1 | 192 | 108 | 102 | 58 | 164 |
| Brad Keller | 7 | 14 | 4.19 | 28 | 28 | 0 | 165.1 | 154 | 80 | 77 | 70 | 122 |
| Glenn Sparkman | 4 | 11 | 6.02 | 31 | 23 | 0 | 136.0 | 164 | 96 | 91 | 41 | 81 |
| Danny Duffy | 7 | 6 | 4.34 | 23 | 23 | 0 | 130.2 | 125 | 69 | 63 | 46 | 115 |
| Jorge López | 4 | 9 | 6.33 | 39 | 18 | 1 | 123.2 | 140 | 94 | 87 | 42 | 109 |
| Homer Bailey | 7 | 6 | 4.80 | 18 | 18 | 0 | 90.0 | 89 | 49 | 48 | 38 | 81 |
| Scott Barlow | 3 | 3 | 4.22 | 61 | 0 | 1 | 70.1 | 64 | 33 | 33 | 37 | 92 |
| Mike Montgomery | 2 | 7 | 4.64 | 13 | 13 | 0 | 64.0 | 78 | 37 | 33 | 21 | 51 |
| Ian Kennedy | 3 | 2 | 3.41 | 63 | 0 | 30 | 63.1 | 64 | 24 | 24 | 17 | 73 |
| Kevin McCarthy | 4 | 2 | 4.48 | 56 | 0 | 1 | 60.1 | 68 | 31 | 30 | 21 | 38 |
| Jake Diekman | 0 | 6 | 4.75 | 48 | 0 | 0 | 41.2 | 33 | 23 | 22 | 23 | 63 |
| Wily Peralta | 2 | 4 | 5.80 | 42 | 0 | 2 | 40.1 | 45 | 28 | 26 | 19 | 24 |
| Tim Hill | 2 | 0 | 3.63 | 46 | 0 | 1 | 39.2 | 31 | 17 | 16 | 13 | 39 |
| Jake Newberry | 1 | 0 | 3.77 | 27 | 0 | 0 | 31.0 | 29 | 13 | 13 | 16 | 29 |
| Brian Flynn | 2 | 2 | 5.22 | 11 | 1 | 0 | 29.1 | 38 | 18 | 17 | 17 | 22 |
| Brad Boxberger | 1 | 3 | 5.40 | 29 | 0 | 1 | 26.2 | 25 | 16 | 16 | 17 | 27 |
| Heath Fillmyer | 0 | 2 | 8.06 | 12 | 3 | 0 | 22.1 | 28 | 20 | 20 | 12 | 15 |
| Eric Skoglund | 0 | 3 | 9.00 | 6 | 4 | 0 | 21.0 | 30 | 21 | 21 | 9 | 4 |
| Richard Lovelady | 0 | 3 | 7.65 | 25 | 0 | 0 | 20.0 | 30 | 17 | 17 | 8 | 17 |
| Josh Staumont | 0 | 0 | 3.72 | 16 | 0 | 0 | 19.1 | 21 | 13 | 8 | 10 | 15 |
| Kyle Zimmer | 0 | 1 | 10.80 | 15 | 0 | 0 | 18.1 | 28 | 22 | 22 | 19 | 18 |
| Jacob Barnes | 0 | 4 | 8.31 | 15 | 0 | 0 | 13.0 | 14 | 13 | 12 | 11 | 10 |
| Gabe Speier | 0 | 0 | 7.36 | 9 | 0 | 0 | 7.1 | 5 | 6 | 6 | 6 | 10 |
| Jesse Hahn | 0 | 1 | 13.50 | 6 | 0 | 0 | 4.2 | 7 | 7 | 7 | 6 | 7 |
| Randy Rosario | 1 | 0 | 0.00 | 6 | 0 | 0 | 3.2 | 3 | 1 | 0 | 0 | 3 |
| Alex Gordon | 0 | 0 | 19.29 | 2 | 0 | 0 | 2.1 | 8 | 5 | 5 | 2 | 0 |
| Humberto Arteaga | 0 | 0 | 5.40 | 1 | 0 | 0 | 1.2 | 2 | 1 | 1 | 1 | 0 |
| Chris Owings | 0 | 0 | 21.60 | 1 | 0 | 0 | 1.2 | 6 | 4 | 4 | 1 | 0 |
| Ben Lively | 0 | 0 | 27.00 | 1 | 0 | 0 | 1.0 | 3 | 3 | 3 | 0 | 1 |
| Chris Ellis | 0 | 0 | 0.00 | 1 | 0 | 0 | 1.0 | 1 | 0 | 0 | 1 | 0 |
| Team totals | 59 | 103 | 5.20 | 162 | 162 | 37 | 1425.0 | 1525 | 869 | 824 | 582 | 1230 |

== Farm system ==
| Level | Team | League | Manager |
|---|---|---|---|
| AAA | Omaha Storm Chasers | Pacific Coast League | Brian Poldberg |
| AA | Northwest Arkansas Naturals | Texas League | Darryl Kennedy |
| A-Advanced | Wilmington Blue Rocks | Carolina League | Scott Thorman |
| A | Lexington Legends | South Atlantic League | Brooks Conrad |
| Rookie | Burlington Royals | Appalachian League | Chris Widger |
| Rookie | Idaho Falls Chukars | Pioneer League | Omar Ramirez |
| Rookie | AZL Royals | Arizona League | Tony Peña Jr. |
| Rookie | DSL Royals | Dominican Summer League | Onil Joseph |
