= 2019 Chicago White Sox season =

2019 Chicago White Sox
- League: American League
- Division: Central
- Ballpark: Guaranteed Rate Field
- City: Chicago
- Record: 72–89 (.447)
- Divisional place: 3rd
- Owners: Jerry Reinsdorf
- General managers: Rick Hahn
- Managers: Rick Renteria
- Television: NBC Sports Chicago; NBC Sports Chicago+ WGN-TV (Jason Benetti, Steve Stone, Tom Paciorek, Tony Graffanino)
- Radio: WGN-AM; Chicago White Sox Radio Network (Ed Farmer, Darrin Jackson); WRTO-AM (Spanish) (Hector Molina, Billy Russo)
- Stats: ESPN.com; Baseball Reference

The 2019 Chicago White Sox season was the club's 120th season in Chicago and 119th in the American League. The Sox played their home games at Guaranteed Rate Field. It was the final season of gameday broadcasts on WGN-TV, bringing to a close an era of periodic White Sox free-to-air broadcasts to its fans all over the city, as beginning in 2020 the White Sox will broadcast almost all its home and away games on both NBC Sports Chicago and NBC Sports Chicago+. Although they improved on their 62–100 record from the previous season, they missed the playoffs for the 11th straight year.

== Regular season ==
=== Game log ===
2019 game log: 72–89 (Home: 39–41; Away: 33–48)
March/April: 12–14 (Home: 6–6; Away: 6–8)

#	Date	Opponent	Time (CT)	Score	Win	Loss	Save	Attendance	Record	Streak
1	March 28	@ Royals	3:15 pm	3–5	Keller (1–0)	**Rodón** (0–1)	Boxberger (1)	31,675	0–1	L1
2	March 30	@ Royals	1:15 pm	6–8	Junis (1–0)	**López** (0–1)	Kennedy (1)	13,533	0–2	L2
3	March 31	@ Royals	1:15 pm	6–3	**Giolito** (1–0)	López (0–1)	**Colomé** (1)	12,669	1–2	W1
4	April 1	@ Indians	3:10 pm	3–5	Edwards (2–0)	**Covey** (0–1)	Hand (2)	34,519	1–3	L1
5	April 3	@ Indians	12:10 pm	8–3	**Rodón** (1–1)	Kluber (0–2)	—	10,689	2–3	W1
–	April 4	Mariners	1:10 pm	Postponed (Inclement Weather, makeup date on April 5)						
6	April 5	Mariners	1:10 pm	10–8	**Burr** (1–0)	Gearrin (0–1)	**Colomé** (2)	32,723	3–3	W2
7	April 6	Mariners	1:10 pm	2–9	Leake (2–0)	**Giolito** (1–1)	—	31,286	3–4	L1
8	April 7	Mariners	1:10 pm	5–12	LeBlanc (2–0)	**Nova** (0–1)	—	12,509	3–5	L2
9	April 8	Rays	1:10 pm	1–5	Snell (2–1)	**Rodón** (1–2)	Wood (1)	11,734	3–6	L3
10	April 9	Rays	1:10 pm	5–10	Morton (2–0)	**Santana** (0–1)	—	10,799	3–7	L4
11	April 10	Rays	1:10 pm	1–9	Glasnow (3–0)	**López** (0–2)	Beeks (1)	11,107	3–8	L5
12	April 12	@ Yankees	6:05 pm	9–6 (7)	**Giolito** (2–1)	Happ (0–2)	**Jones** (1)	40,913	4–8	W1
13	April 13	@ Yankees	12:05 pm	0–4	Germán (3–0)	**Nova** (0–2)	—	41,176	4–9	L1
14	April 14	@ Yankees	12:05 pm	5–2	**Rodón** (2–2)	Tanaka (1–1)	**Colomé** (3)	40,104	5–9	W1
15	April 15	Royals	7:10 pm	5–4	**Bañuelos** (1–0)	Boxberger (0–3)	**Colomé** (4)	12,553	6–9	W2
16	April 16	Royals	7:10 pm	5–1	**López** (1–2)	López (0–2)	—	13,583	7–9	W3
17	April 17	Royals	1:10 pm	3–4 (10)	Peralta (2–1)	**Jones** (0–1)	Barlow (1)	14,358	7–10	L1
18	April 18	@ Tigers	12:10 pm	7–9	VerHagen (1–0)	**Fulmer** (0–1)	Greene (9)	14,320	7–11	L2
19	April 19	@ Tigers	6:10 pm	7–3	**Rodón** (3–2)	Zimmermann (0–3)	—	14,568	8–11	W1
–	April 20	@ Tigers	12:10 pm	Postponed (Rain, makeup date on August 6)						
20	April 21	@ Tigers	12:10 pm	3–4	Norris (1–0)	**López** (1–3)	Greene (10)	15,686	8–12	L1
21	April 22	@ Orioles	6:05 pm	12–2	**Fry** (1–0)	Hess (1–4)	—	8,555	9–12	W1
22	April 23	@ Orioles	6:05 pm	1–9	Cashner (4–1)	**Nova** (0–3)	—	8,953	9–13	L1
23	April 24	@ Orioles	6:05 pm	3–4	Means (3–2)	**Santana** (0–2)	Givens (1)	10,555	9–14	L2
24	April 26	Tigers	7:10 pm	12–11	**Colomé** (1–0)	Jiménez (1–1)	—	18,016	10–14	W1
–	April 27	Tigers	6:10 pm	Postponed (Inclement Weather, makeup date on July 3)						
25	April 28	Tigers	1:10 pm	4–1	**López** (2–3)	Boyd (2–2)	**Colomé** (5)	14,539	11–14	W2
26	April 29	Orioles	7:10 pm	5–3	**Bañuelos** (2–0)	Means (3–3)	**Colomé** (6)	14,717	12–14	W3
–	April 30	Orioles	7:10 pm	Postponed (Inclement Weather, makeup date on May 1)						

May: 16–15 (Home: 10–7; Away: 6–8)

#	Date	Opponent	Time (CT)	Score	Win	Loss	Save	Attendance	Record	Streak
27	May 1	Orioles	3:10 pm	4–5	Kline (1–0)	**Herrera** (0–1)	Givens (2)	TBA G2	12–15	L1
28	May 1	Orioles	7:30 pm	7–6	**Vieira** (1–0)	Phillips (0–1)	—	14,781	13–15	W1
29	May 2	Red Sox	7:10 pm	6–4	**Fulmer** (1–1)	Brasier (1–1)	—	15,118	14–15	W1
30	May 3	Red Sox	7:10 pm	1–6	Sale (1–5)	**López** (2–4)	—	17,504	14–16	L1
31	May 4	Red Sox	6:10 pm	2–15	Rodríguez (3–2)	**Bañuelos** (2–1)	—	30,068	14–17	L2
32	May 5	Red Sox	1:10 pm	2–9	Workman (2–1)	**Herrera** (0–2)	—	36,553	14–18	L3
33	May 6	@ Indians	5:10 pm	9–1	**Nova** (1–3)	Bauer (4–2)	—	12,745	15–18	W1
34	May 7	@ Indians	5:10 pm	2–0	**Giolito** (3–1)	Rodríguez (0–2)	**Colomé** (7)	12,961	16–18	W2
35	May 8	@ Indians	5:10 pm	3–5	Hand (2–1)	**Fry** (1–1)	—	12,519	16–19	L1
36	May 9	@ Indians	12:10 pm	0–5 (6)	Carrasco (3–3)	**Bañuelos** (2–2)	—	13,247	16–20	L2
37	May 10	@ Blue Jays	6:07 pm	3–4	Biagini (2–1)	**Covey** (0–2)	Giles (9)	20,402	16–21	L3
38	May 11	@ Blue Jays	2:07 pm	7–2	**Nova** (2–3)	Stroman (1–6)	—	24,563	17–21	W1
39	May 12	@ Blue Jays	12:07 pm	5–1	**Giolito** (4–1)	Sanchez (3–4)	—	24,222	18–21	W2
40	May 13	Indians	7:10 pm	5–2	**López** (3–4)	Bieber (2–2)	**Colomé** (8)	16,471	19–21	W3
41	May 14	Indians	1:10 pm	0–9	Carrasco (4–3)	**Bañuelos** (2–3)	—	18,823	19–22	L1
42	May 16	Blue Jays	7:10 pm	4–2	**Herrera** (1–2)	Law (0–1)	**Colomé** (9)	20,119	20–22	W1
43	May 17	Blue Jays	7:10 pm	2–10	Gaviglio (3–0)	**Nova** (2–4)	Guerra (1)	17,078	20–23	L1
44	May 18	Blue Jays	1:10 pm	4–1 (5)	**Giolito** (5–1)	Feierabend (0–1)	—	22,908	21–23	W1
45	May 19	Blue Jays	1:10 pm	2–5	Hudson (3–1)	**Herrera** (1–3)	Giles (10)	18,605	21–24	L1
46	May 20	@ Astros	7:10 pm	0–3	Peacock (5–2)	**Burr** (1–1)	Osuna (12)	24,364	21–25	L2
47	May 21	@ Astros	7:10 pm	1–5	Verlander (8–1)	**Covey** (0–3)	—	31,392	21–26	L3
48	May 22	@ Astros	7:10 pm	9–4	**Nova** (3–4)	Cole (4–5)	—	30,237	22–26	W1
49	May 23	@ Astros	7:10 pm	4–0	**Giolito** (6–1)	Martin (1–1)	—	26,073	23–26	W2
50	May 24	@ Twins	7:10 pm	4–11	Berríos (7–2)	**López** (3–5)	—	29,638	23–27	L1
51	May 25	@ Twins	1:10 pm	1–8	Gibson (5–2)	**Bañuelos** (2–4)	—	39,139	23–28	L2
52	May 26	@ Twins	1:10 pm	0–7	Odorizzi (7–2)	**Covey** (0–4)	—	39,913	23–29	L3
53	May 27	Royals	1:10 pm	Suspended (inclement weather, continuation scheduled for May 28)						
53	May 28	Royals	7:10 pm	2–1	**Colomé** (2–0)	Diekman (0–2)	—	13,842	24–29	W1
54	May 28	Royals	7:10 pm	4–3	**Giolito** (7–1)	Keller (3–6)	**Colomé** (10)	13,842	25–29	W2
55	May 29	Royals	7:10 pm	8–7	**Herrera** (2–3)	Kennedy (0–2)	**Colomé** (11)	16,167	26–29	W3
56	May 30	Indians	7:10 pm	10–4	**Bañuelos** (3–4)	Carrasco (4–6)	—	22,182	27–29	W4
57	May 31	Indians	7:10 pm	6–1	**Covey** (1–4)	Bauer (4–5)	—	21,652	28–29	W5

June: 11–13 (Home: 6–5; Away: 5–8)

#	Date	Opponent	Time (CT)	Score	Win	Loss	Save	Attendance	Record	Streak
58	June 1	Indians	1:10 pm	2–5	Pérez (1–0)	**Nova** (3–5)	Hand (16)	25,873	28–30	L1
59	June 2	Indians	1:10 pm	2–0	**Giolito** (8–1)	Plesac (0–1)	**Colomé** (12)	26,453	29–30	W1
60	June 4	@ Nationals	6:05 pm	5–9	Strasburg (6–3)	**López** (3–6)	Doolittle (13)	32,513	29–31	L1
61	June 5	@ Nationals	12:05 pm	4–6	Doolittle (4–1)	**Colomé** (2–1)	—	28,910	29–32	L2
62	June 7	@ Royals	7:15 pm	4–6	Boxberger (1–3)	**Fry** (1–2)	Kennedy (4)	24,744	29–33	L3
63	June 8	@ Royals	1:15 pm	2–0	**Giolito** (9–1)	Keller (3–8)	**Colomé** (13)	20,889	30–33	W1
64	June 9	@ Royals	1:15 pm	5–2	**López** (4–6)	Sparkman (1–2)	—	22,501	31–33	W2
65	June 10	Nationals	7:10 pm	1–12	Sánchez (2–6)	**Despaigne** (0–1)	—	16,305	31–34	L1
66	June 11	Nationals	7:10 pm	7–5	**Marshall** (1–0)	Corbin (5–5)	**Colomé** (14)	16,970	32–34	W1
67	June 13	Yankees	7:10 pm	5–4	**Marshall** (2–0)	Ottavino (2–2)	**Bummer** (1)	25,311	33–34	W2
68	June 14	Yankees	7:10 pm	10–2	**Giolito** (10–1)	Sabathia (3–4)	—	31,438	34–34	W3
69	June 15	Yankees	6:10 pm	4–8	Cortes Jr. (1–0)	**López** (4–7)	—	36,074	34–35	L1
70	June 16	Yankees	1:10 pm	3–10	Paxton (4–3)	**Despaigne** (0–2)	—	37,277	34–36	L2
71	June 18	@ Cubs	7:05 pm	3–1	**Marshall** (3–0)	Strop (1–3)	**Colomé** (15)	41,192	35–36	W1
72	June 19	@ Cubs	7:05 pm	3–7	Lester (6–5)	**Giolito** (10–2)	—	39,776	35–37	L1
73	June 21	@ Rangers	7:05 pm	5–4 (10)	**Herrera** (3–3)	Kelley (3–2)	**Colomé** (16)	29,333	36–37	W1
74	June 22	@ Rangers	8:05 pm	5–6	Lynn (9–4)	**Marshall** (3–1)	Martin (3)	33,582	36–38	L1
75	June 23	@ Rangers	2:05 pm	4–7	Sampson (6–4)	**Nova** (3–6)	Kelley (10)	21,917	36–39	L2
76	June 24	@ Red Sox	6:10 pm	5–6	Workman (7–1)	**Fry** (1–3)	—	36,117	36–40	L3
77	June 25	@ Red Sox	6:10 pm	3–6	Price (5–2)	**Ruiz** (0–1)	Workman (3)	34,470	36–41	L4
78	June 26	@ Red Sox	12:05 pm	8–7	**Colomé** (3–1)	Barnes (3–3)	—	36,823	37–41	W1
79	June 28	Twins	7:10 pm	6–4	**Detwiler** (1–0)	Berríos (8–4)	**Colomé** (17)	28,218	38–41	W2
80	June 29	Twins	3:12 pm	3–10	Pineda (5–4)	**Nova** (3–7)	—	27,908	38–42	L1
81	June 30	Twins	1:10 pm	4–3	**Giolito** (11–2)	Thorpe (0–1)	**Colomé** (18)	27,244	39–42	W1

July: 7–16 (Home: 5–9; Away: 2–7)

#	Date	Opponent	Time (CT)	Score	Win	Loss	Save	Attendance	Record	Streak
—	July 2	Tigers	7:10 pm	Postponed (Inclement Weather, makeup date on September 27)						
82	July 3	Tigers	1:10 pm	7–5	**Cease** (1–0)	Norris (2–8)	**Colomé** (19)	26,023	40–42	W2
83	July 3	Tigers	7:10 pm	9–6 (12)	**Ruiz** (1–1)	Ramirez (3–3)	—	23,161	41–42	W3
84	July 4	Tigers	1:10 pm	5–11	Boyd (6–6)	**López** (4–8)	—	25,617	41–43	L1
85	July 6	Cubs	6:15 pm	3–6	Lester (8–6)	**Giolito** (11–3)	Kimbrel (2)	38,634	41–44	L2
86	July 7	Cubs	1:10 pm	3–1	**Nova** (4–7)	Hendricks (7–7)	**Colomé** (20)	38,554	42–44	W1
—	July 9	**90th All-Star Game in Cleveland, OH**								
87	July 12	@ Athletics	9:07 pm	1–5	Fiers (9–3)	**Nova** (4–8)	Hendriks (6)	18,504	42–45	L1
88	July 13	@ Athletics	3:07 pm	2–13	Bassitt (6–4)	**Covey** (1–5)	—	22,222	42–46	L2
89	July 14	@ Athletics	3:07 pm	2–3	Hendriks (4–0)	**Fry** (1–4)	—	20,350	42–47	L3
90	July 15	@ Royals	7:15 pm	2–5	Junis (5–8)	**Giolito** (11–4)	Kennedy (14)	16,006	42–48	L4
91	July 16	@ Royals	7:15 pm	0–11	Sparkman (3–5)	**Cease** (1–1)	—	16,557	42–49	L5
92	July 17	@ Royals	7:15 pm	5–7	Duffy (4–5)	**Nova** (4–9)	Kennedy (15)	14,340	42–50	L6
93	July 18	@ Royals	12:15 pm	5–6	Keller (6–9)	**Detwiler** (1–1)	Kennedy (16)	13,157	42–51	L7
94	July 19	@ Rays	6:10 pm	9–2	**López** (5–8)	McKay (1–1)	—	16,971	43–51	W1
95	July 20	@ Rays	5:10 pm	2–1 (11)	**Fry** (2–4)	Kolarek (3–3)	**Colomé** (21)	16,338	44–51	W2
96	July 21	@ Rays	12:10 pm	2–4	Snell (6–7)	**Cease** (1–2)	Kolarek (1)	14,987	44–52	L1
97	July 22	Marlins	7:10 pm	9–1	**Nova** (5–9)	Richards (3–12)	—	14,471	45–52	W1
98	July 23	Marlins	7:10 pm	1–5	Smith (6–4)	**Covey** (1–6)	—	14,043	45–53	L1
99	July 24	Marlins	7:10 pm	0–2	Gallen (1–2)	**López** (5–9)	Romo (17)	19,098	45–54	L2
100	July 25	Twins	7:10 pm	3–10	Berríos (9–5)	**Giolito** (11–5)	—	22,087	45–55	L3
101	July 26	Twins	7:10 pm	2–6	Pineda (7–5)	**Cease** (1–3)	—	22,602	45–56	L4
102	July 27	Twins	6:10 pm	5–1	**Nova** (6–9)	Pérez (8–4)	—	34,085	46–56	W1
103	July 28	Twins	1:10 pm	1–11	Gibson (10–4)	**Covey** (1–7)	—	27,595	46–57	L1
104	July 30	Mets	7:10 pm	2–5 (11)	Gsellman (2–2)	**Ruiz** (1–2)	—	15,947	46–58	L2
105	July 31	Mets	7:10 pm	2–4	Wilson (2–1)	**Colomé** (3–2)	Díaz (24)	25,812	46–59	L3

August: 14–16 (Home: 6–8; Away: 8–8)

#	Date	Opponent	Time (CT)	Score	Win	Loss	Save	Attendance	Record	Streak
106	August 1	Mets	1:10 pm	0-4	Wheeler (8–6)	**Cease** (1–4)	—	23,477	46-60	L4
107	August 2	@ Phillies	6:05 pm	4–3 (15)	**Osich** (1–0)	Quinn (0–1)	—	26,635	47–60	W1
108	August 3	@ Phillies	6:05 pm	2–3	Nola (10–2)	**Detwiler** (1–2)	Pivetta (1)	32,647	47–61	L1
109	August 4	@ Phillies	12:05 pm	10–5	**López** (6–9)	Smyly (2–6)	—	31,562	48–61	W1
110	August 5	@ Tigers	6:10 pm	7–4	**Giolito** (12–5)	Soto (0–5)	—	16,942	49–61	W2
111	August 6	@ Tigers	12:10 pm	5–3	**Cease** (2–4)	Norris (3–9)	**Colomé** (22)	18,455	50–61	W3
112	August 6	@ Tigers	6:10 pm	6–10	VerHagen (2–2)	**Santiago** (1–1)	—	16,367	50–62	L1
113	August 7	@ Tigers	12:10 pm	8–1	**Nova** (7–9)	Alexander (0–3)	—	17,444	51–62	W1
114	August 9	Athletics	2:10 pm	0–7	Fiers (11–3)	**Detwiler** (1–3)	—	18,318	51–63	L1
115	August 10	Athletics	6:10 pm	3–2	**López** (7–9)	Roark (7–8)	**Colomé** (23)	27,026	52–63	W1
116	August 11	Athletics	1:10 pm	0–2	Bassitt (8–5)	**Giolito** (12–6)	Hendriks (12)	30,951	52–64	L1
—	August 12	Astros	7:10 pm	Postponed (Inclement Weather, makeup date on August 13)						
117	August 13	Astros	3:40 pm	2–6	Greinke (12–4)	**Cease** (2–5)	—	N/A	52–65	L2
118	August 13	Astros	7:10 pm	4–1	**Nova** (8–9)	Devenski (2–1)	—	19,559	53–65	W1
119	August 14	Astros	1:10 pm	13–9	**Colomé** (4–2)	Pressly (2–3)	—	18,899	54–65	W2
120	August 15	@ Angels	9:07 pm	7–8	Heaney (2–3)	**López** (7–10)	Robles (17)	33,533	54–66	L1
121	August 16	@ Angels	9:07 pm	7–2	**Giolito** (13–6)	Sandoval (0–1)	—	39,206	55–66	W1
122	August 17	@ Angels	8:07 pm	5–6	Cole (3–4)	**Marshall** (3–2)	Robles (18)	39,419	55–67	L1
123	August 18	@ Angels	3:07 pm	2–9	Canning (5–6)	**Cease** (2–6)	—	35,436	55–68	L2
124	August 19	@ Twins	7:10 pm	6–4	**Nova** (9–9)	Gibson (11–6)	**Colomé** (24)	25,564	56–68	W1
125	August 20	@ Twins	7:10 pm	4–14	Pineda (9–5)	**López** (7–11)	—	26,798	56–69	L1
126	August 21	@ Twins	12:10 pm	4–0	**Giolito** (14–6)	Odorizzi (13–6)	—	31,389	57–69	W1
127	August 22	Rangers	7:10 pm	6–1	**Detwiler** (2–3)	Jurado (6–10)	—	18,563	58–69	W2
128	August 23	Rangers	7:10 pm	8–3	**Cease** (3–6)	Lynn (14–9)	—	27,016	59–69	W3
129	August 24	Rangers	6:10 pm	0–4	Allard (2–0)	**Nova** (9–10)	—	26,454	59–70	L1
130	August 25	Rangers	1:10 pm	2–0	**López** (8–11)	Burke (0–1)	**Colomé** (25)	25,553	60–70	W1
131	August 27	Twins	7:10 pm	1–3	Pineda (10–5)	**Giolito** (14–7)	Rogers (21)	12,175	60–71	L1
132	August 28	Twins	7:10 pm	2–8	Odorizzi (14–6)	**Detwiler** (2–4)	—	16,802	60–72	L2
133	August 29	Twins	1:10 pm	5–10	Berríos (11–7)	**Cease** (3–7)	Dobnak (1)	15,886	60–73	L3
134	August 30	@ Braves	6:20 pm	7–10	Fried (15–4)	**Nova** (9–11)	Melancon (7)	39,098	60–74	L4
135	August 31	@ Braves	6:20 pm	5–11	Keuchel (6–5)	**López** (8–12)	—	36,664	60–75	L5

September: 12–14 (Home: 6–6; Away: 6–8)

#	Date	Opponent	Time (CT)	Score	Win	Loss	Save	Attendance	Record	Streak
136	September 1	@ Braves	4:10 pm	3–5	Teherán (9–8)	**Giolito** (14–8)	Melancon (8)	41,397	60–76	L6
137	September 2	@ Indians	6:10 pm	3–11	Civale (3–3)	**Detwiler** (2–5)	—	16,149	60–77	L7
138	September 3	@ Indians	6:10 pm	6–5	**Marshall** (4–2)	Carrasco (4–7)	**Colomé** (26)	17,397	61–77	W1
139	September 4	@ Indians	6:10 pm	6–8	Bieber (13–7)	**Nova** (9–12)	Wittgren (4)	25,488	61–78	L1
140	September 5	@ Indians	12:10 pm	7–1	**López** (9–12)	Plesac (7–6)	—	18,913	62–78	W1
141	September 6	Angels	7:10 pm	4–5	Robles (5–0)	**Colomé** (4–3)	—	20,026	62–79	L1
142	September 7	Angels	6:10 pm	7–8	Heaney (4–4)	**Covey** (1–8)	Robles (20)	25,230	62–80	L2
143	September 8	Angels	1:10 pm	5–1	**Osich** (2–0)	Barría (4–8)	—	22,681	63–80	W1
144	September 10	Royals	7:10 pm	7–3	**Nova** (10–12)	Junis (9–13)	—	15,196	64–80	W2
145	September 11	Royals	7:10 pm	6–8	Sparkman (4–11)	**López** (9–13)	Kennedy (28)	14,385	64–81	L1
146	September 12	Royals	1:10 pm	3–6	López (4–7)	**Giolito** (14–9)	Kennedy (29)	13,838	64–82	L2
147	September 13	@ Mariners	9:10 pm	9–7	**Osich** (3–0)	Kikuchi (6–10)	**Colomé** (27)	17,255	65–82	W1
148	September 14	@ Mariners	8:10 pm	1–2 (10)	Magill (5–2)	**Colomé** (4–4)	—	26,063	65–83	L1
149	September 15	@ Mariners	3:10 pm	10–11	Adams (2–2)	**Ruiz** (1–3)	—	17,091	65–84	L2
150	September 16	@ Twins	6:40 pm	3–5	Berríos (13–8)	**López** (9–14)	Rogers (27)	21,850	65–85	L3
151	September 17	@ Twins	6:40 pm	8–9 (12)	Harper (4–2)	**Ruiz** (1–4)	—	22,518	65–86	L4
152	September 18	@ Twins	6:40 pm	3–1	**Fry** (3–4)	Odorizzi (14–7)	**Colomé** (28)	23,759	66–86	W1
153	September 20	@ Tigers	6:10 pm	10–1	**Cease** (4–7)	Zimmermann (1–12)	—	15,265	67–86	W2
154	September 21	@ Tigers	5:10 pm	5–3	**Nova** (11–12)	Alexander (1–4)	**Colomé** (29)	16,891	68–86	W3
155	September 22	@ Tigers	12:10 pm	3–6	Boyd (9–11)	**López** (9–15)	Jiménez (8)	16,157	68–87	L1
156	September 24	Indians	7:10 pm	0–11	Clevinger (13–3)	**Fulmer** (1–2)	—	13,940	68–88	L2
157	September 25	Indians	7:10 pm	8–3	**Detwiler** (3–5)	Bieber (15–8)	**Colomé** (30)	15,980	69–88	W1
158	September 26	Indians	7:10 pm	8–0	**Osich** (4–0)	Civale (3–4)	—	16,273	70–88	W2
—	September 27	Tigers	1:10 pm	Cancelled (Inclement Weather)						
—	September 27	Tigers	7:10 pm	Postponed (Inclement Weather, makeup date on September 28)						
159	September 28	Tigers	2:40 pm	7–1	**López** (10–15)	Boyd (9–12)	—	N/A	71–88	W3
160	September 28	Tigers	6:00 pm	3–4	Farmer (6–6)	**Colomé** (4–5)	Jiménez (9)	25,552	71–89	L1
161	September 29	Tigers	2:10 pm	5–3	**Cordero** (1–1)	Turnbull (3–17)	**Herrera** (1)	19,534	72–89	W1

Legend: = Win = Loss = Postponement
Bold = White Sox team member

=== Season standings ===
==== American League Central ====
AL Central
Team	W	L	Pct.	GB	Home	Road
Minnesota Twins	101	61	.623	—	46‍–‍35	55‍–‍26
Cleveland Indians	93	69	.574	8	49‍–‍32	44‍–‍37
Chicago White Sox	72	89	.447	28½	39‍–‍41	33‍–‍48
Kansas City Royals	59	103	.364	42	31‍–‍50	28‍–‍53
Detroit Tigers	47	114	.292	53½	22‍–‍59	25‍–‍55

==== American League Wild Card ====
Division leaders
Team	W	L	Pct.
Houston Astros	107	55	.660
New York Yankees	103	59	.636
Minnesota Twins	101	61	.623

Wild Card teams (Top 2 teams qualify for postseason)
Team	W	L	Pct.	GB
Oakland Athletics	97	65	.599	+1
Tampa Bay Rays	96	66	.593	—
Cleveland Indians	93	69	.574	3
Boston Red Sox	84	78	.519	12
Texas Rangers	78	84	.481	18
Chicago White Sox	72	89	.447	23½
Los Angeles Angels	72	90	.444	24
Seattle Mariners	68	94	.420	28
Toronto Blue Jays	67	95	.414	29
Kansas City Royals	59	103	.364	37
Baltimore Orioles	54	108	.333	42
Detroit Tigers	47	114	.292	48½

==== Record against opponents ====
2019 American League record Source: MLB Standings Grid – 2019
Team	BAL	BOS	CWS	CLE	DET	HOU	KC	LAA	MIN	NYY	OAK	SEA	TB	TEX	TOR	NL
Baltimore	—	7–12	3–3	3–4	3–4	2–4	3–3	4–3	0–6	2–17	1–6	3–4	7–12	1–6	8–11	7–13
Boston	12–7	—	5–2	3–3	5–2	2–4	5–1	4–3	3–3	5–14	4–3	4–3	7–12	4–3	11–8	10–10
Chicago	3–3	2–5	—	11–8	12–6	4–3	9–10	2–5	6–13	4–3	1–5	2–4	2–4	4–3	4–3	6–14
Cleveland	4–3	3–3	8–11	—	18–1	3–4	12–7	6–0	10–9	4–3	1–5	5–1	1–6	4–3	6–1	8–12
Detroit	4–3	2–5	6–12	1–18	—	1–6	10–9	3–3	5–14	3–3	1–6	1–6	2–4	0–6	3–4	5–15
Houston	4–2	4–2	3–4	4–3	6–1	—	5–1	14–5	3–4	4–3	11–8	18–1	3–4	13–6	4–2	11–9
Kansas City	3–3	1–5	10–9	7–12	9–10	1–5	—	2–4	5–14	2–5	2–5	2–5	3–4	2–5	1–6	9–11
Los Angeles	3–4	3–4	5–2	0–6	3–3	5–14	4–2	—	1–5	2–5	6–13	10–9	3–4	9–10	6–1	12–8
Minnesota	6–0	3–3	13–6	9–10	14–5	4–3	14–5	5–1	—	2–4	3–4	5–2	5–2	6–1	4–3	8–12
New York	17–2	14–5	3–4	3–4	3–3	3–4	5–2	5–2	4–2	—	2–4	6–1	12–7	3–3	11–8	12–8
Oakland	6–1	3–4	5–1	5–1	6–1	8–11	5–2	13–6	4–3	4–2	—	10–9	4–3	13–6	0–6	11–9
Seattle	4–3	3–4	4–2	1–5	6–1	1–18	5–2	9–10	2–5	1–6	9–10	—	2–4	8–11	4–2	9–11
Tampa Bay	12–7	12–7	4–2	6–1	4–2	4–3	4–3	4–3	2–5	7–12	3–4	4–2	—	3–3	13–6	14–6
Texas	6–1	3–4	3–4	3–4	6–0	6–13	5–2	10–9	1–6	3–3	6–13	11–8	3–3	—	3–3	9–11
Toronto	11–8	8–11	3–4	1–6	4–3	2–4	6–1	1–6	3–4	8–11	6–0	2–4	6–13	3–3	—	3–17

== Roster ==
2019 Chicago White Sox
Roster
Pitchers: 58 Manny Bañuelos; 39 Aaron Bummer; 61 Ryan Burr; 84 Dylan Cease; 48 Álex Colomé; 60 Jimmy Cordero; 68 Dylan Covey; 25 Odrisamer Despaigne; 54 Ross Detwiler; 53 Caleb Frare; 57 Jace Fry; 51 Carson Fulmer; 27 Lucas Giolito; 41 Kelvin Herrera; 65 Nate Jones; 40 Reynaldo López; 43 Evan Marshall; 37 Juan Minaya; 46 Iván Nova; 64 Josh Osich; 55 Carlos Rodon; 66 José Ruiz; 54 Ervin Santana; 53 Hector Santiago; 50 Thyago Vieira	Catchers: 21 Welington Castillo; 38 Zack Collins; 33 James McCann; 59 Seby Zavala; Infielders: 79 José Abreu; 17 Yonder Alonso; 7 Tim Anderson; 17 Ryan Goins; 20 Danny Mendick; 10 Yoan Moncada; 24 A. J. Reed; 20 José Rondón; 5 Yolmer Sánchez; 32 Matt Skole	Outfielders: 49 Ryan Cordell; 30 Nick Delmonico; 15 Adam Engel; 28 Leury García; 45 Jon Jay; 74 Eloy Jiménez; 18 Daniel Palka; 22 Charlie Tilson	Manager: 36 Rick Renteria; Coaches: 8 Daryl Boston (first base); 12 Nick Capra (third base); 99 Don Cooper (pitching); -- Miguel Gonzalez (bullpen catcher); 29 Curt Hasler (bullpen); 47 Joe McEwing (bench/infield); -- Luis Sierra (bullpen catcher); 26 Greg Sparks (assistant hitting); 31 Todd Steverson (hitting)

== Player stats ==
=== Batting ===
Note: G = Games played; AB = At bats; R = Runs; H = Hits; 2B = Doubles; 3B = Triples; HR = Home runs; RBI = Runs batted in; SB = Stolen bases; BB = Walks; AVG = Batting average; SLG = Slugging average

Player	G	AB	R	H	2B	3B	HR	RBI	SB	BB	AVG	SLG
José Abreu	159	634	85	180	38	1	33	123	2	36	.284	.503
Leury García	140	577	93	161	27	3	8	40	15	21	.279	.378
Yoán Moncada	132	511	83	161	34	5	25	79	10	40	.315	.548
Tim Anderson	123	498	81	167	32	0	18	56	17	15	.335	.508
Yolmer Sánchez	149	496	59	125	20	4	2	43	5	44	.252	.321
Eloy Jiménez	122	468	69	125	18	2	31	79	0	30	.267	.513
James McCann	118	439	62	120	26	1	18	60	4	30	.273	.460
Welington Castillo	72	230	19	48	12	0	12	41	0	16	.209	.417
Adam Engel	89	227	26	55	10	2	6	26	3	14	.242	.383
Yonder Alonso	67	219	23	39	6	0	7	27	0	29	.178	.301
Ryan Cordell	97	217	22	48	8	0	7	24	3	19	.221	.355
Jon Jay	47	165	12	44	8	0	0	9	0	8	.267	.315
Ryan Goins	52	144	13	36	6	1	2	10	0	17	.250	.347
Charlie Tilson	54	144	16	33	5	0	1	12	4	10	.229	.285
José Rondón	55	142	10	28	3	0	3	9	0	11	.197	.282
Zack Collins	27	86	10	16	3	1	3	12	0	14	.186	.349
Daniel Palka	30	84	4	9	0	0	2	4	0	8	.107	.179
Matt Skole	27	72	7	15	2	0	0	6	0	7	.208	.236
Nicky Delmonico	21	63	6	13	2	0	1	6	0	4	.206	.286
A. J. Reed	14	44	1	6	0	0	1	4	0	4	.136	.205
Danny Mendick	16	39	6	12	0	0	2	4	0	1	.308	.462
Seby Zavala	5	12	1	1	0	0	0	0	0	0	.083	.083
Pitcher totals	161	18	0	1	0	0	0	2	0	0	.056	.056
Team totals	161	5529	708	1443	260	20	182	676	63	378	.261	.414

=== Pitching ===
Note: W = Wins; L = Losses; ERA = Earned run average; G = Games pitched; GS = Games started; SV = Saves; IP = Innings pitched; H = Hits allowed; R = Runs allowed; ER = Earned runs allowed; BB = Walks; SO = Strikeouts

Player	W	L	ERA	G	GS	SV	IP	H	R	ER	BB	SO
Iván Nova	11	12	4.72	34	34	0	187.0	225	107	98	47	114
Reynaldo López	10	15	5.38	33	33	0	184.0	203	119	110	65	169
Lucas Giolito	14	9	3.41	29	29	0	176.2	131	69	67	57	228
Dylan Cease	4	7	5.79	14	14	0	73.0	78	51	47	35	81
Ross Detwiler	3	5	6.59	18	12	0	69.2	86	54	51	27	46
Josh Osich	4	0	4.66	57	0	0	67.2	62	38	35	15	61
Aaron Bummer	0	0	2.13	58	0	1	67.2	43	17	16	24	60
Alex Colomé	4	5	2.80	62	0	30	61.0	42	28	19	23	55
Dylan Covey	1	8	7.98	18	12	0	58.2	75	54	52	28	41
Jace Fry	3	4	4.75	68	0	0	55.0	44	33	29	43	68
Kelvin Herrera	3	3	6.14	57	0	1	51.1	60	36	35	23	53
Manny Bañuelos	3	4	6.93	16	8	0	50.2	60	39	39	33	44
Evan Marshall	4	2	2.49	55	0	0	50.2	42	16	14	24	41
José Ruiz	1	4	5.63	40	1	0	40.0	56	27	25	24	35
Jimmy Cordero	1	0	2.75	30	0	0	36.0	24	11	11	11	31
Carlos Rodón	3	2	5.19	7	7	0	34.2	33	22	20	17	46
Juan Minaya	0	0	3.90	22	0	0	27.2	31	13	12	12	27
Carson Fulmer	1	2	6.26	20	2	0	27.1	26	22	19	20	25
Hector Santiago	0	1	6.66	11	2	0	25.2	32	20	19	17	34
Ryan Burr	1	1	4.58	16	1	0	19.2	17	13	10	8	20
Ervin Santana	0	2	9.45	3	3	0	13.1	19	14	14	6	5
Odrisamer Despaigne	0	2	9.45	3	3	0	13.1	24	14	14	7	7
Nate Jones	0	1	3.48	13	0	1	10.1	10	4	4	7	10
Thyago Vieira	1	0	9.00	6	0	0	7.0	11	8	7	5	8
Caleb Frare	0	0	10.13	5	0	0	2.2	2	3	3	4	3
José Rondón	0	0	0.00	1	0	0	1.0	2	0	0	0	0
A. J. Reed	0	0	0.00	1	0	0	1.0	0	0	0	0	0
Team totals	72	89	4.90	161	161	33	1412.2	1438	832	769	582	1312

== Farm system ==
Level	Team	League	Manager
AAA	Charlotte Knights	International League	
AA	Birmingham Barons	Southern League	
A-Advanced	Winston-Salem Dash	Carolina League	
A	Kannapolis Intimidators	South Atlantic League	
Rookie	Great Falls Voyagers	Pioneer League	
Rookie	AZL White Sox	Arizona League	
Rookie	DSL White Sox	Dominican Summer League	
