= Ben Lively =

American baseball player (born 1992)

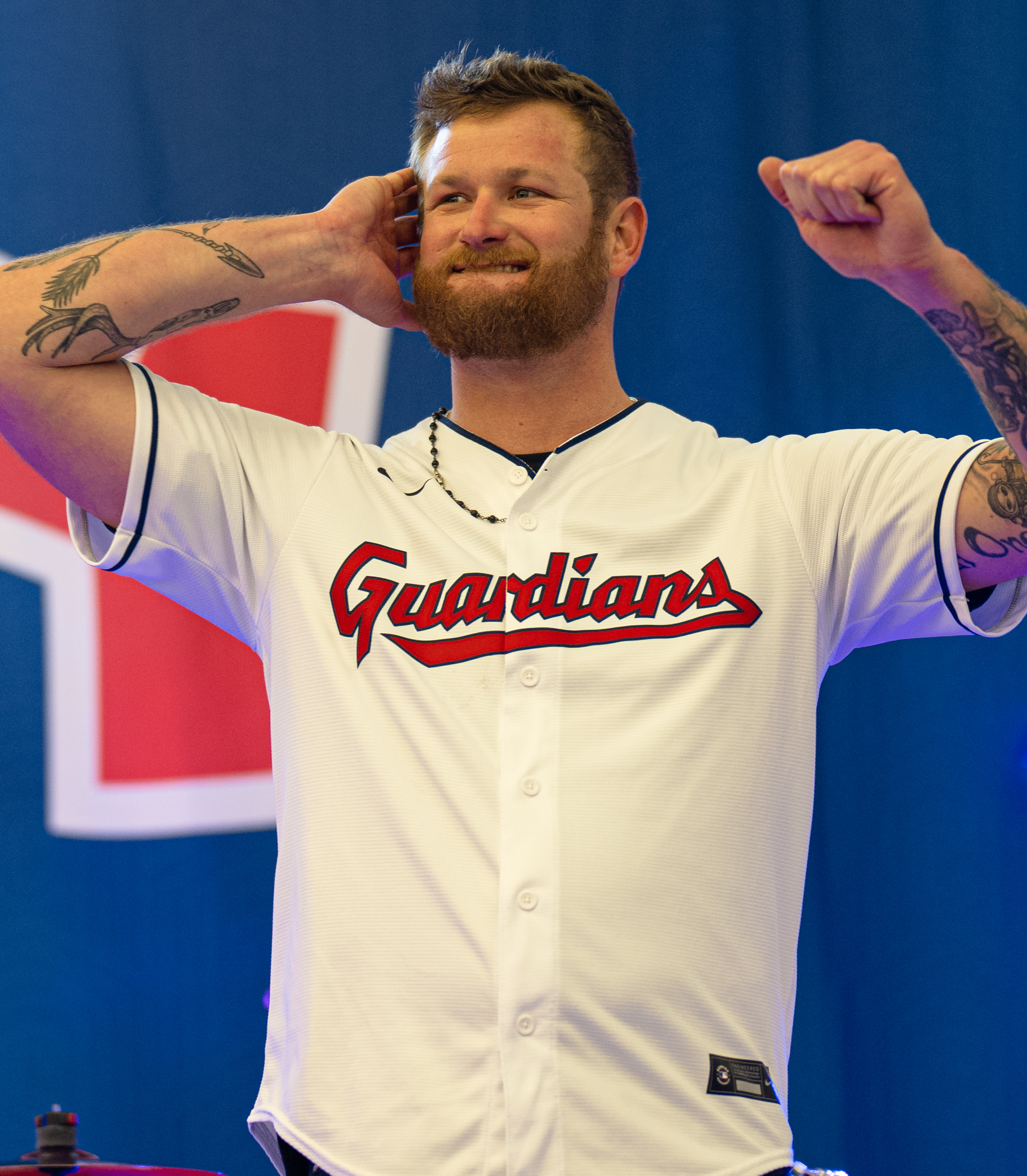
- Lively with the Cleveland Guardians in 2024

Cleveland Guardians
- Pitcher
- Born: March 5, 1992 (age 34); Pensacola, Florida, U.S.
- Bats: Right Throws: Right

Professional debut
- MLB: June 3, 2017, for the Philadelphia Phillies
- KBO: August 13, 2019, for the Samsung Lions

MLB statistics (through 2025 season)
- Win–loss record: 23–29
- Earned run average: 4.38
- Strikeouts: 306

KBO statistics (through 2021 season)
- Win–loss record: 10–12
- Earned run average: 4.14
- Strikeouts: 191
- Stats at Baseball Reference

Teams
- Philadelphia Phillies (2017–2018); Kansas City Royals (2018–2019); Samsung Lions (2019–2021); Cincinnati Reds (2023); Cleveland Guardians (2024–2025)

Edward Bennett Lively (born March 5, 1992) is an American professional baseball pitcher in the Cleveland Guardians organization. He has previously played in Major League Baseball (MLB) for the Philadelphia Phillies, Kansas City Royals, and Cincinnati Reds, and in the KBO League for the Samsung Lions.

== Early life and education ==
Lively was born to Edward and Ginny Lively in Pensacola, Florida. He began playing organized baseball at age 4 in the Tee-ball league; he was allowed to join a year early because of his prowess and the fact that his grandfather, Jim Lively, who coached him throughout his childhood, was the league commissioner. He is a graduate of Gulf Breeze High School.

The Cleveland Indians selected Lively in the 26th round of the 2010 Major League Baseball draft out of high school. He did not sign and instead attended the University of Central Florida (UCF). In his three years pitching for the UCF Knights baseball team, he went 21–8 with a 3.06 earned run average (ERA) and 226 strikeouts over 244 innings. After his sophomore season in 2012, he played collegiate summer baseball for the Yarmouth–Dennis Red Sox of the Cape Cod Baseball League.

== Career ==
=== Cincinnati Reds ===
The Cincinnati Reds selected Lively in the fourth round of the 2013 Major League Baseball draft. He made his professional debut with the Billings Mustangs and made one start with the Dayton Dragons. Lively finished his first season, 0–4 but with a 0.88 ERA and 56 strikeouts in 41 innings. He started the 2014 season with the Bakersfield Blaze. He was named as the top player in the Reds' farm system in 2014 after posting a 13–7 record and 3.04 ERA with Bakersfield and the Double-A Pensacola Blue Wahoos.

=== Philadelphia Phillies ===
On December 31, 2014, the Reds traded Lively to the Philadelphia Phillies in exchange for Marlon Byrd.

In 2015, Lively went 8–7 with a 4.13 ERA in 25 games with the Double-A Reading Fightin Phils. He began the 2016 season with Reading before being promoted to the Triple-A Lehigh Valley IronPigs. He received the 2016 Paul Owens Award as best pitcher in the Phillies' farm system. The Phillies added him to their 40-man roster after the 2016 season. He was assigned to Lehigh Valley to begin the 2017 season.

On June 3, 2017, Lively made his major league debut with the Philadelphia Phillies against the San Francisco Giants. He allowed one run on four hits and three walks, earning his first major league win. In his June 24 start against the Arizona Diamondbacks, he collected his first major league RBI with a 2-run home run, but gave up 4 earned runs and took the 9–2 loss. He finished his rookie season with a 4–7 record and 4.26 ERA in 15 major league appearances. In 2018, Lively pitched in 5 games for Philadelphia, but after struggling to an 0–2 record and 6.85 ERA, he was designated for assignment on September 3, 2018.

=== Kansas City Royals ===
On September 5, 2018, Lively was claimed off waivers by the Kansas City Royals, who then designated Eric Stout for assignment to add Lively to the 40-man roster. Lively recorded a 1.35 ERA in 6.2 innings of work for Kansas City in 2018. He was assigned to the Triple-A Omaha Storm Chasers to begin the 2019 season. Lively himself was designated for assignment on June 20, 2019, following the promotion of Humberto Arteaga. He allowed 3 runs in the only inning he pitched for Kansas City.

=== Arizona Diamondbacks ===
On June 22, 2019, Lively was traded to the Arizona Diamondbacks in exchange for cash considerations. He was assigned to the Triple-A Reno Aces, where he recorded a 5.04 ERA and 2–1 record across 7 appearances.

=== Samsung Lions ===
On August 7, 2019, Lively left the Diamondbacks organization to sign with the Samsung Lions of the KBO League. Lively pitched to a 4–4 record and a 3.95 ERA in his first season with Samsung. Lively re-signed with Samsung for the 2020 season on a $700,000 contract. In 2020 he pitched to a 6–7 record and 4.26 ERA in 21 appearances. Lively only made six appearances in 2021, registering a 4.05 ERA. On June 1, 2021, Lively was released after being diagnosed with a shoulder injury.

=== Cincinnati Reds (second stint) ===
On January 6, 2022, Lively signed a minor league contract with the Cincinnati Reds. He spent the entire year with the Triple-A Louisville Bats, making 18 starts and registering a 2–5 record and 4.09 ERA with 79 strikeouts in 77 innings pitched. He elected free agency following the season on November 10.

On November 19, 2022, Lively re-signed with the Reds on a new minor league contract. He was assigned to Triple-A Louisville to begin the 2023 season, where he posted a 4–0 record and 2.33 ERA with 16 strikeouts across 5 games (4 starts). On May 9, 2023, Lively had his contract selected to the active roster. He made his first start on May 20 against the New York Yankees, allowing 2 runs on 2 hits and one walk with a career-high 8 strikeouts in 5.2 innings pitched. In an August 1 start against the Chicago Cubs, Lively allowed 13 runs on 13 hits and 2 walks in 4.0 innings of work. In 19 total games (12 starts) for Cincinnati, he logged a 4–7 record and 5.38 ERA with 79 strikeouts in 88 2/3 innings of work. Following the season on October 18, Lively was removed from the 40–man roster and sent outright to Triple–A Louisville. He elected free agency on November 6.

=== Cleveland Guardians ===
On December 12, 2023, Lively signed a major league contract with the Cleveland Guardians. He started 29 total games in the 2024 season, pitching to a 3.81 ERA with 118 strikeouts in 151 innings. Lively was not selected to the Guardians' active roster in their ALDS series against the Detroit Tigers or ALCS series against the New York Yankees.

Lively signed a one-year, $2.25 million deal with the Guardians in November 2024 to avoid arbitration. He unexpectedly started on Opening Day for the Guardians when planned starter Tanner Bibee became unavailable due to acute gastroenteritis. Lively allowed three runs and four hits in five innings pitched. In nine starts for Cleveland, he posted a 2–2 record and 3.22 ERA with 29 strikeouts across 44 2/3 innings pitched. On May 23, 2025, it was announced that Lively would undergo Tommy John surgery and a flexor tendon repair, ruling him out for the remainder of the season. On November 6, Lively was removed from the 40-man roster and sent outright to the Triple-A Columbus Clippers; he subsequently rejected the assignment and elected free agency.

On February 12, 2026, Lively agreed to re-sign with the Guardians organization on a two-year minor league contract. In 11 starts between Triple-A and High-A he threw 40 innings going 0–3 with a 5.63 ERA and 27 strikeouts.
