= Danny Duffy =

American baseball player (born 1988)

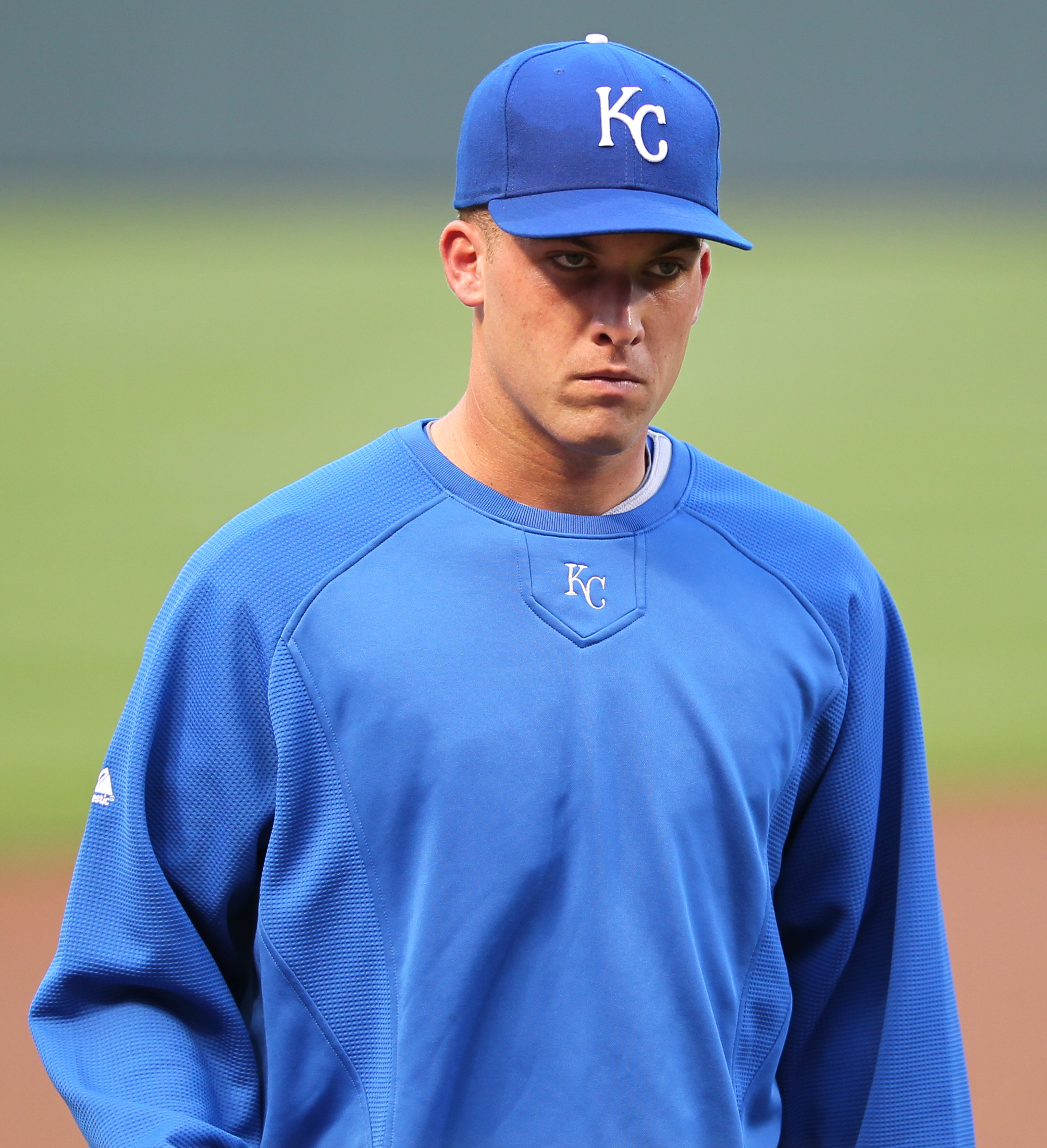
- Duffy with the Kansas City Royals in 2011
- Pitcher
- Born: December 21, 1988 (age 37); Goleta, California, U.S.
- Batted: Left Threw: Left

MLB debut
- May 18, 2011, for the Kansas City Royals

Last MLB appearance
- July 16, 2021, for the Kansas City Royals

MLB statistics
- Win–loss record: 68–68
- Earned run average: 3.95
- Strikeouts: 1,048
- Stats at Baseball Reference

Teams
- Kansas City Royals (2011–2021)

Career highlights and awards
- World Series champion (2015)
Medals
Men's baseball
Representing United States
World Baseball Classic
Gold medal – first place	2017 Los Angeles	Team

Daniel Richard Duffy (born December 21, 1988) is an American former professional baseball pitcher. He played in Major League Baseball (MLB) for the Kansas City Royals.

After being drafted by the Royals in 2007, Duffy spent the next several years in the Royals' minor league system, and represented the team in the 2009 All-Star Futures Game. However, personal issues led Duffy to temporarily retire from baseball in 2010, although he returned to the Royals later that year. Duffy made his MLB debut in 2011. After his rookie season, Duffy did not pitch in MLB on a regular basis again until 2014. He was a member of the Royals' pitching staffs during the team's successful 2014 and 2015 seasons, and won a World Series championship with the Royals in 2015. Duffy had a career year in 2016, setting career highs in many statistical categories. After the 2016 season, Duffy signed a $65 million extension to remain with the Royals. The Royals traded Duffy to the Dodgers during the 2021 season, but due to injury, he did not appear in an MLB game for the Dodgers.

== Early life ==
Duffy was born on December 21, 1988, in Goleta, California. He was exposed to the game of baseball at an early age, both through playing competitively in local youth leagues and practicing with his family.

Duffy attended Cabrillo High School in Vandenberg Village, California, where he played both baseball and basketball. For the baseball team, Duffy had a 5–3 win–loss record, a 0.60 earned run average, and 127 strikeouts in 58 2/3 innings pitched in his senior year.

== Professional career ==
=== Kansas City Royals ===
==== Minor leagues ====
The Kansas City Royals drafted Duffy in the third round, with the 96th overall selection, of the 2007 MLB draft out of high school. He began his professional career that season with the Arizona Royals of the rookie-level Arizona League, where he pitched in 11 games and had a 1.45 earned run average (ERA).

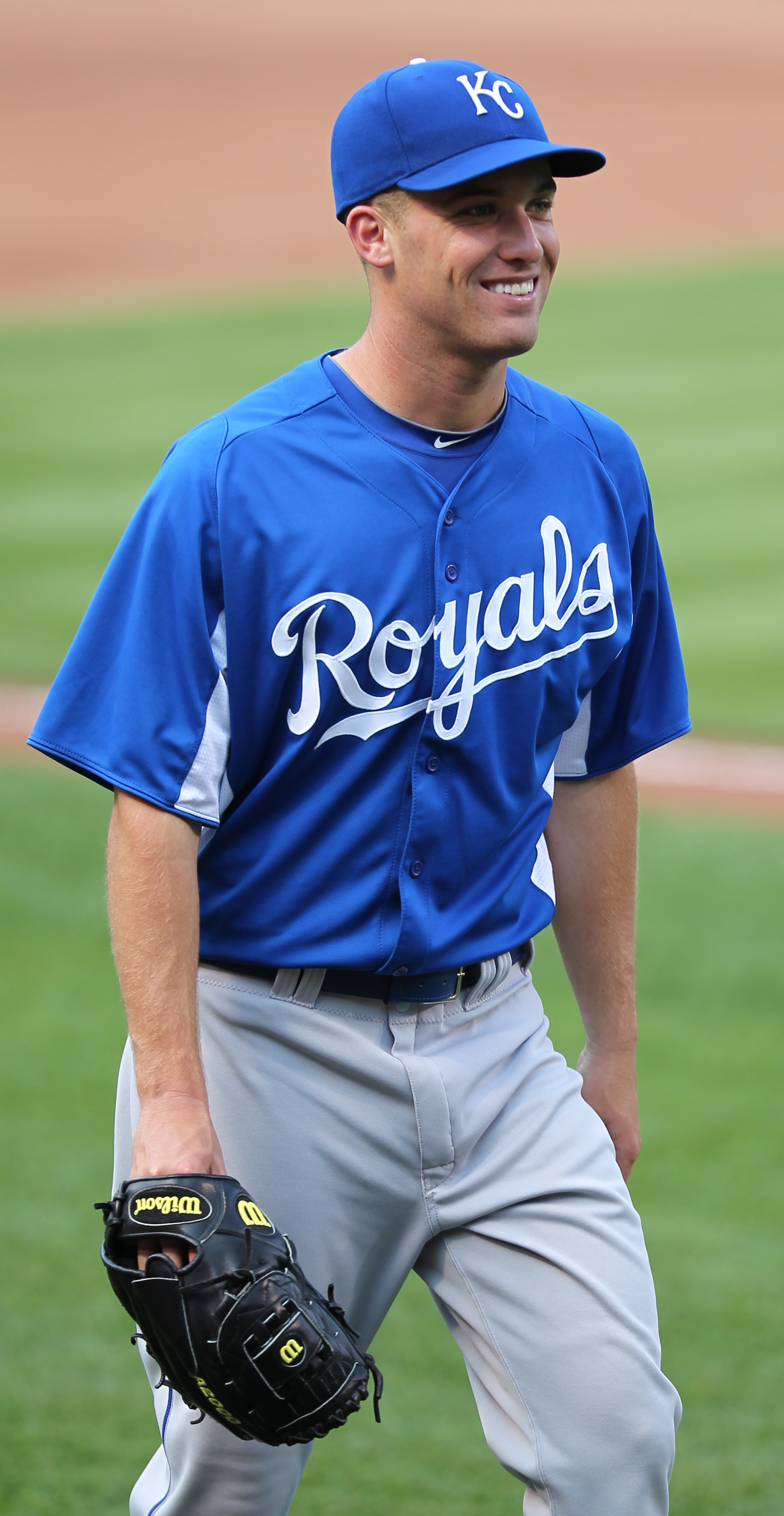
Duffy with the Royals in 2011

The Royals promoted Duffy to Burlington Bees of the Class A Midwest League in 2008, where he had an 8–4 record and a 2.20 ERA in 17 starts. He was named Burlington's Pitcher of the Year. In 2009, Duffy started 24 games for the Wilmington Blue Rocks of the Class A-Advanced Carolina League. He was named a Carolina League All-Star, and finished the season with a 9–3 record and a 2.98 ERA. Duffy represented the Royals in the 2009 All-Star Futures Game, where he pitched 2/3 scoreless innings.

The Royals invited Duffy to spring training in 2010. However, Duffy abruptly retired from baseball in March 2010, at the age of 21. He informed the Royals' organization that he wanted to "reassess his life priorities". The move reminded many of Zack Greinke's departure from the Royals' camp in 2006. Realizing that he missed the game of baseball, Duffy decided to unretire and return to the Royals in June, showing up at the extended spring training in Surprise, Arizona. Later that season, Duffy pitched for Wilmington, the Idaho Falls Chukars of the rookie-level Pioneer League, and Northwest Arkansas Naturals of the Double-A Texas League. Duffy went 5–2 with a 2.95 ERA in seven regular-season starts for the Naturals, and 1–0 with a 1.69 ERA in two playoff games, as the Naturals won the Texas League championship. He pitched in the Arizona Fall League after the season.

Heading into the 2011 season, Baseball America rated Duffy as the 68th best prospect in baseball. The Royals again invited Duffy to spring training. Duffy began the 2011 season with the Omaha Storm Chasers of the Triple-A Pacific Coast League . With Omaha, Duffy was named Pacific Coast League Pitcher of the Week for the week of April 25 – May 1. Duffy pitched to a 3–1 record and 3.00 ERA in seven starts for Omaha, recording 43 strikeouts while only walking 10 and allowing 30 hits in 36 innings.

==== 2011–2015 ====
The Royals promoted Duffy to the MLB, and he made his MLB debut on May 18, 2011. He gave up two runs in four innings; he did not earn the decision in a 5–4 loss to the Texas Rangers. He recorded his first MLB win on June 14, pitching six innings against the Oakland Athletics. Duffy finished the 2011 season with a 4–8 record and 5.64 ERA in 20 MLB starts.

After signing a contract for $487,750 prior to the 2012 season, Duffy competed for, and won, a spot in the starting rotation during spring training.

Duffy made six starts in 2012 before suffering a torn ulnar collateral ligament in his left elbow that required Tommy John surgery on June 13, 2012. Prior to being sidelined, Duffy had a 2–2 record with an ERA of 3.90. On November 2, 2012, the Royals reinstated Duffy from the 60-day disabled list; however, he was not expected to return to pitching for the Royals until late June or early July.

Duffy signed a one-year $505,125 contract on February 20, 2013. On May 26, 2013, Duffy began a rehab assignment with the Northwest Arkansas Naturals. While still undergoing rehab from his injury, Duffy was reassigned to the Omaha Storm Chasers (a higher level minor league affiliate than the Naturals) on June 6. He was optioned to Omaha at the end of the rehab period on June 25. Duffy was recalled from Omaha on August 7, and returned on August 8. He was recalled on August 16 to start the first game of a doubleheader against the Detroit Tigers, in a game the Royals went on to win.

On March 2, 2014, Duffy signed a one-year $526,000 contract. During spring training in 2014, Yordano Ventura won the final spot in the Royals' starting rotation over Duffy. However, when Bruce Chen went down with a back injury early in the season, Duffy took over his spot in the rotation. He posted a 9–12 record with a 2.53 ERA over 149 1/3 innings.

Duffy pitched to a 4.08 ERA during the 2015 season. In September, Duffy was moved from the starting rotation to the bullpen. In the 2015 World Series, Duffy made three relief appearances as the Royals defeated the New York Mets in five games to win the World Series championship.

==== 2016–2021 ====
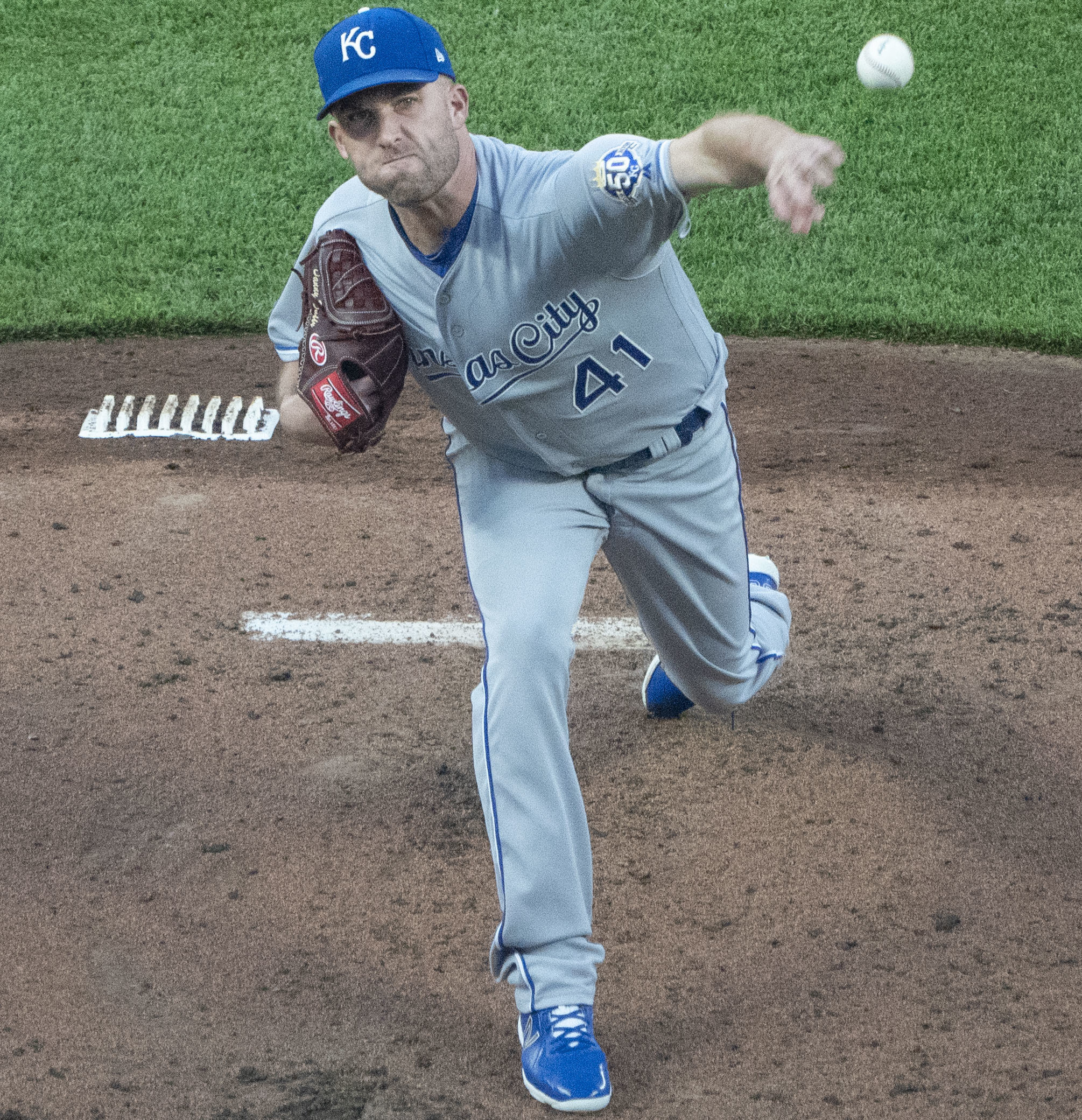
Duffy pitching in 2018

Duffy signed a one-year, $4.225 million contract with the Royals for the 2016 season. He began the season as a relief pitcher, but rejoined the Royals' starting rotation in May. Duffy responded to the move out of the bullpen with a strong season, setting a career high in wins with a 12–3 win–loss record. On August 1, 2016, Duffy set the Royals' record for most strikeouts in a single game with a 16-strikeout performance against the Tampa Bay Rays. In that game, Duffy carried a no-hitter into the eighth, losing it on a leadoff double by Desmond Jennings of the Tampa Bay Rays. On August 11, Duffy pitched all nine innings in a game against the Chicago White Sox for his first career complete game. Duffy was considered to be a contender for the American League Cy Young Award, the annual award given to the best pitcher in each league, although Duffy ultimately received no votes for that award.

Besides his career-high 12 wins, Duffy pitched to a 3.51 ERA and increased his strikeouts per 9 innings pitched ratio to 9.4. He had the highest zone percentage of all major league pitchers, with 49.8% of his pitches being in the strike zone.

On January 16, 2017, Duffy signed a five-year contract extension with the Royals worth $65 million. On April 3, 2017, Duffy was the Royals' Opening Day starter against the Minnesota Twins. He pitched six innings, throwing eight strikeouts, allowing three hits and three walks. Despite hopes that Duffy could build upon the momentum from his 2016 season, multiple injuries limited his playing time. On May 30, Duffy was placed on the 15-day disabled list due to a Grade 1 oblique strain. On August 26, Duffy was again placed on the 10-day disabled list, this time due to left elbow impingement. He finished the regular season in 2017 with a 9–10 record and an era of 3.81. He pitched 143 1/3 innings in 24 games at the major league level, all as a starter.

In the offseason before the 2018 season, Duffy was widely rumored to be a potential trade piece, leading Duffy to post on Twitter "bury me a Royal" to signal his opposition to being traded. Duffy had a poor start to the 2018 season, but finished with a respectable 8–12 record and 4.88 ERA over 28 starts. He also finished second in the American League in wild pitches and 7th in walks allowed, indicating struggles with his command.

Heading into the 2019 season, Duffy was viewed as a potential "building block" for the Royals' pitching staff. However, left shoulder tightness led to Duffy beginning the season on the injured list. He was activated on April 26. After returning, Duffy was a consistent starter in the Royals' rotation, and pitched a season-high 8 innings against the Minnesota Twins on June 22. He made another appearance on the injured list in August with a strained hamstring. This injury sidelined Duffy for about a month, although he returned in September, starting five games and winning two of them. Duffy ended the season with a 7–6 record, a 4.34 ERA, and 115 strikeouts in 130 2/3 innings.

With the 2020 Kansas City Royals, Duffy appeared in 12 games, compiling a 4–4 record with 4.95 ERA and 57 strikeouts in 56 1/3 innings pitched.

For the 2021 season, Duffy chose to change his jersey number to No. 30 in honor of his former teammate, Yordano Ventura. Duffy experienced pain in his left arm and went on the injured list in May; an MRI diagnosed it as a flexor tendon strain. He was activated from the injured list in late June, but returned to the injured list with a recurrence of his strain in July. In 13 appearances (12 starts), Duffy was 4–3 with an ERA of 2.51 covering 61 innings.

=== Los Angeles Dodgers ===
On July 29, 2021, the Royals traded Duffy and cash considerations to the Los Angeles Dodgers in exchange for a player to be named later—the Royals later acquired minor-league reliever Zach Willeman to complete the trade. Duffy attempted to rehabilitate his injury, but suffered a setback and the Dodgers shut him down without making an appearance for the team. Duffy had surgery during the offseason on the flexor tendon.

On March 17, 2022, Duffy signed with the Dodgers on a one-year contract with an additional club option year. The team placed Duffy on the 60-day injured list prior to the start of the regular season. However, he suffered another setback and was initially declared unlikely to pitch in 2022. Despite that, he made his Dodgers organization debut with a rehab appearance for the Arizona Complex League Dodgers on August 20. He went on to make appearances with the Class A Rancho Cucamonga Quakes and Triple-A Oklahoma City Dodgers, registering a combined 5.40 ERA with 11 strikeouts in 6 2/3 innings pitched for the three teams. After the season, the Dodgers declined Duffy's 2023 option, making him a free agent.

=== Texas Rangers ===
On January 27, 2023, Duffy signed a minor-league contract with the Texas Rangers organization. He began the season on the injured list, then was activated to pitch for the Double-A Frisco RoughRiders in early June. In 28 appearances split between Frisco and the Triple–A Round Rock Express, Duffy recorded a cumulative 3.28 ERA with 42 strikeouts across 35 2/3 innings of work. On November 6, he elected free agency. During the offseason, he pitched for Cangrejeros de Santurce of the Puerto Rican Winter League.

On February 5, 2024, Duffy re-signed with the Rangers on a new minor-league contract. In 10 games for Triple–A Round Rock, he compiled a 5.50 ERA with 17 strikeouts across 18 innings pitched. On May 8, Duffy was released by the Rangers organization.

=== Piratas de Campeche ===
On May 10, 2025, Duffy signed with the Piratas de Campeche of the Mexican League. He was released prior to the start of the season.

== International career ==
Duffy was a member of the United States national baseball team in the Pan American Games Qualifying Tournament, in the 2010–11 offseason, along with future Royals teammates Mike Moustakas and Eric Hosmer. Duffy also represented the United States as a member of the national team competing at the 2017 World Baseball Classic, an international tournament. Duffy's performance included wins against the national teams of Canada and the Dominican Republic. The United States team went on to win the tournament.

== Personal life ==
Duffy's father, Dan, is an investigator for the Santa Barbara County Sheriff's Office. His mother, Deanna, worked as a California Highway Patrol officer. She played softball, and throws batting practice for him.

On August 27, 2017, Duffy was arrested for driving under the influence of alcohol after passing out in the drive-thru of a Burger King in Overland Park, Kansas. At the time of his arrest, he was on the disabled list due to his elbow injury and was not traveling with the Royals. He entered a guilty plea and was sentenced to one year of probation in January 2018.

Duffy has been open about his struggles with depression (which had forced his temporary retirement in 2010), and has been outspoken about the need for better mental health support in professional sports.
