= Glenn Sparkman =

American baseball player (born 1992)

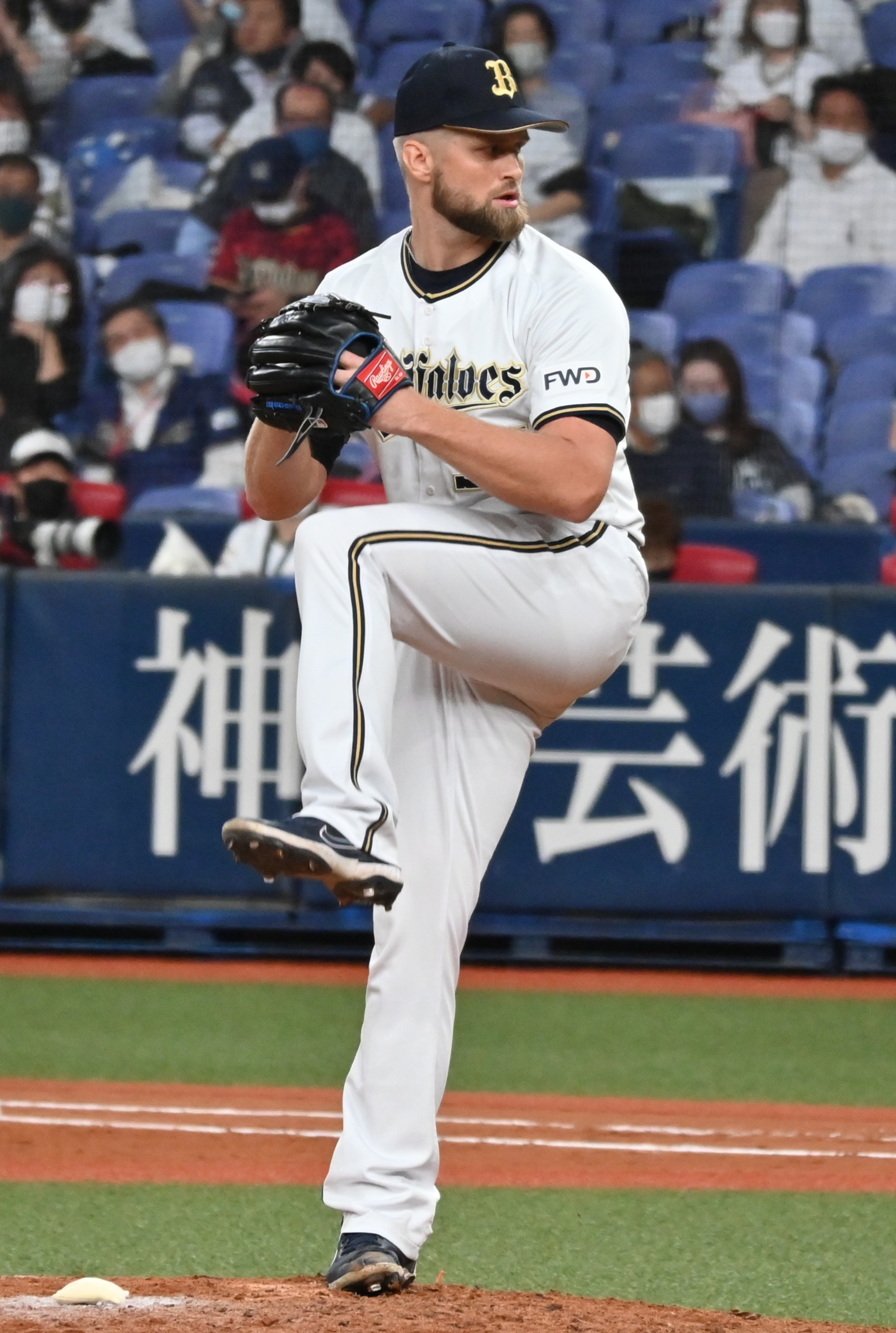
- Sparkman with the Orix Buffaloes in 2021
- Pitcher
- Born: May 11, 1992 (age 34); Ganado, Texas, U.S.
- Batted: Right Threw: Right

Professional debut
- MLB: June 30, 2017, for the Toronto Blue Jays
- NPB: August 18, 2021, for the Orix Buffaloes
- KBO: April 10, 2022, for the Lotte Giants

Last appearance
- MLB: August 2, 2020, for the Kansas City Royals
- NPB: September 19, 2021, for the Orix Buffaloes
- KBO: July 29, 2022, for the Lotte Giants

MLB statistics
- Win–loss record: 4–14
- Earned run average: 5.99
- Strikeouts: 111

NPB statistics
- Win–loss record: 0–1
- Earned run average: 6.88
- Strikeouts: 14

KBO statistics
- Win–loss record: 2-4
- Earned run average: 5.31
- Strikeouts: 89
- Stats at Baseball Reference

Teams
- Toronto Blue Jays (2017); Kansas City Royals (2018–2020); Orix Buffaloes (2021); Lotte Giants (2022)

Glenn Michael Sparkman (born May 11, 1992) is an American former professional baseball pitcher. He played in Major League Baseball (MLB) for the Toronto Blue Jays and Kansas City Royals. He also played in Nippon Professional Baseball (NPB) for the Orix Buffaloes and in the KBO League for the Lotte Giants.

== Early life and college ==
Sparkman attended Ganado High School in his hometown of Ganado, Texas. Undrafted out of high school, he attended Wharton County Junior College in Wharton, Texas. In 2013, his junior year, he went 5-4 with a 2.78 ERA in 77.2 innings.

== Professional career ==
=== Kansas City Royals ===
Sparkman was selected by the Kansas City Royals in the 20th round of the 2013 Major League Baseball draft. He was assigned to the Rookie Idaho Falls Chukars for the 2013 season and made 20 relief appearances, posting a 1–0 win–loss record, 1.72 earned run average (ERA), and 47 strikeouts in 36 2/3 innings pitched. Sparkman was promoted to the Advanced-A Wilmington Blue Rocks of the Carolina League for the 2014 season. He was named the Carolina League's Pitcher of the Year after pitching to an 8–3 record, 1.56 ERA, and 117 strikeouts in 121 innings pitched.

Sparkman began the 2015 season with the Double-A Northwest Arkansas Naturals, making four starts and going 2–2 with a 3.60 ERA before going on the disabled list with an arm injury. It was later determined that he needed Tommy John surgery, which caused him to miss the remainder of the season and the start of the 2016 season. Sparkman rehabbed with the Arizona League Royals, and also made starts for the Class-A Lexington Legends, Advanced-A Wilmington, and Double-A Northwest Arkansas in 2016. In 16 combined starts, he posted a 2–7 record, 5.22 ERA, and 65 strikeouts in 60 1/3 innings.

=== Toronto Blue Jays ===
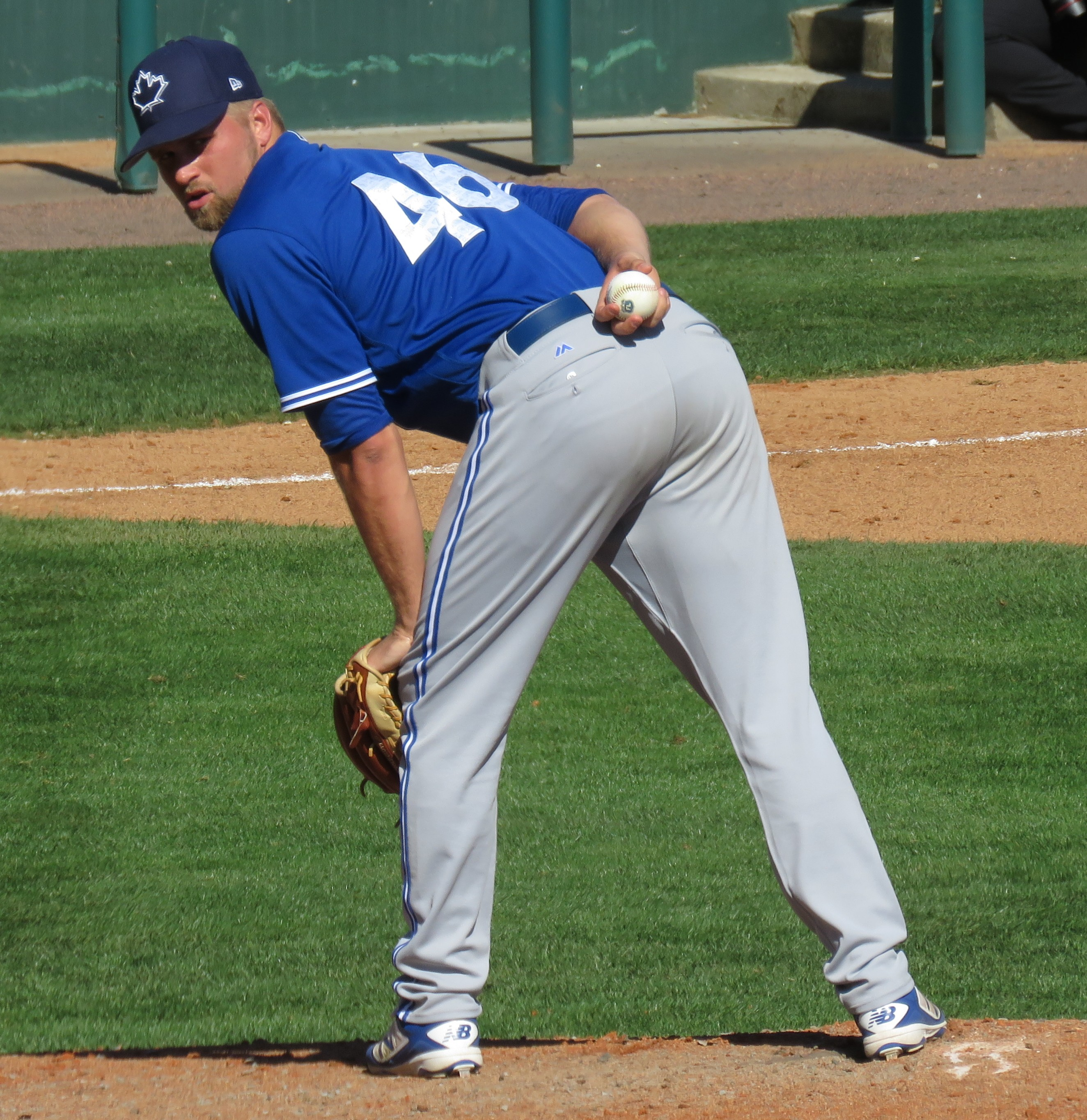
Sparkman pitching for the Toronto Blue Jays in 2017 Spring Training

On December 8, 2016, Sparkman was selected by the Toronto Blue Jays in the 2016 Rule 5 draft. Sparkman suffered a broken right thumb in spring training in 2017, and opened the season on the 10-day disabled list. On April 10, he was transferred to the 60-day disabled list. Sparkman was activated on June 30 and called up by the Blue Jays. He appeared in relief in two games, giving up seven runs over a single inning pitched. He was designated for assignment on July 3.

=== Kansas City Royals (second stint) ===
On July 8, 2017, Sparkman was returned to the Royals organization. He finished the year with the Double-A Northwest Arkansas Naturals, posting a 2.61 ERA in 3 appearances. He was assigned to Northwest Arkansas to begin the 2018 season, later receiving a promotion to the Triple-A Omaha Storm Chasers. Sparkman was added to the Royals active roster on July 8, 2018. In 15 games on the year, Sparkman recorded an 0-3 record and 4.46 ERA.

Sparkman pitched in 31 games for the Royals in 2019, posting a 4-11 record and 6.02 ERA with 81 strikeouts in 136.0 innings of work. With the 2020 Kansas City Royals, Sparkman appeared in 4 games, compiling a 0-0 record with 5.40 ERA and 2 strikeouts in 5.0 innings pitched. On November 20, 2020, Sparkman was designated for assignment. On November 23, the Royals released Sparkman.

=== Minnesota Twins ===
On December 17, 2020, Sparkman signed a minor league contract with the Minnesota Twins organization. Sparkman pitched three innings of one-run ball for the Triple-A St. Paul Saints before being released on May 18, 2021.

=== Orix Buffaloes ===
On June 23, 2021, Sparkman signed with the Orix Buffaloes of Nippon Professional Baseball (NPB). On August 18, he made his debut at NPB as a starter against the Hokkaido Nippon-Ham Fighters. Sparkman pitched 17 innings for the Buffaloes, posting an 0-1 record with a 6.88 ERA and 14 strikeouts. He became a free agent following the 2021 season.

=== Lotte Giants ===
On December 12, 2021, Sparkman signed with the Lotte Giants of the KBO League. In 19 starts for the Giants, he logged a 2-4 record and 5.31 ERA with 89 strikeouts across 84 2/3 innings pitched. Sparkman was released by Lotte on August 2, 2022.
