= Jakob Junis =

American baseball player (born 1992)

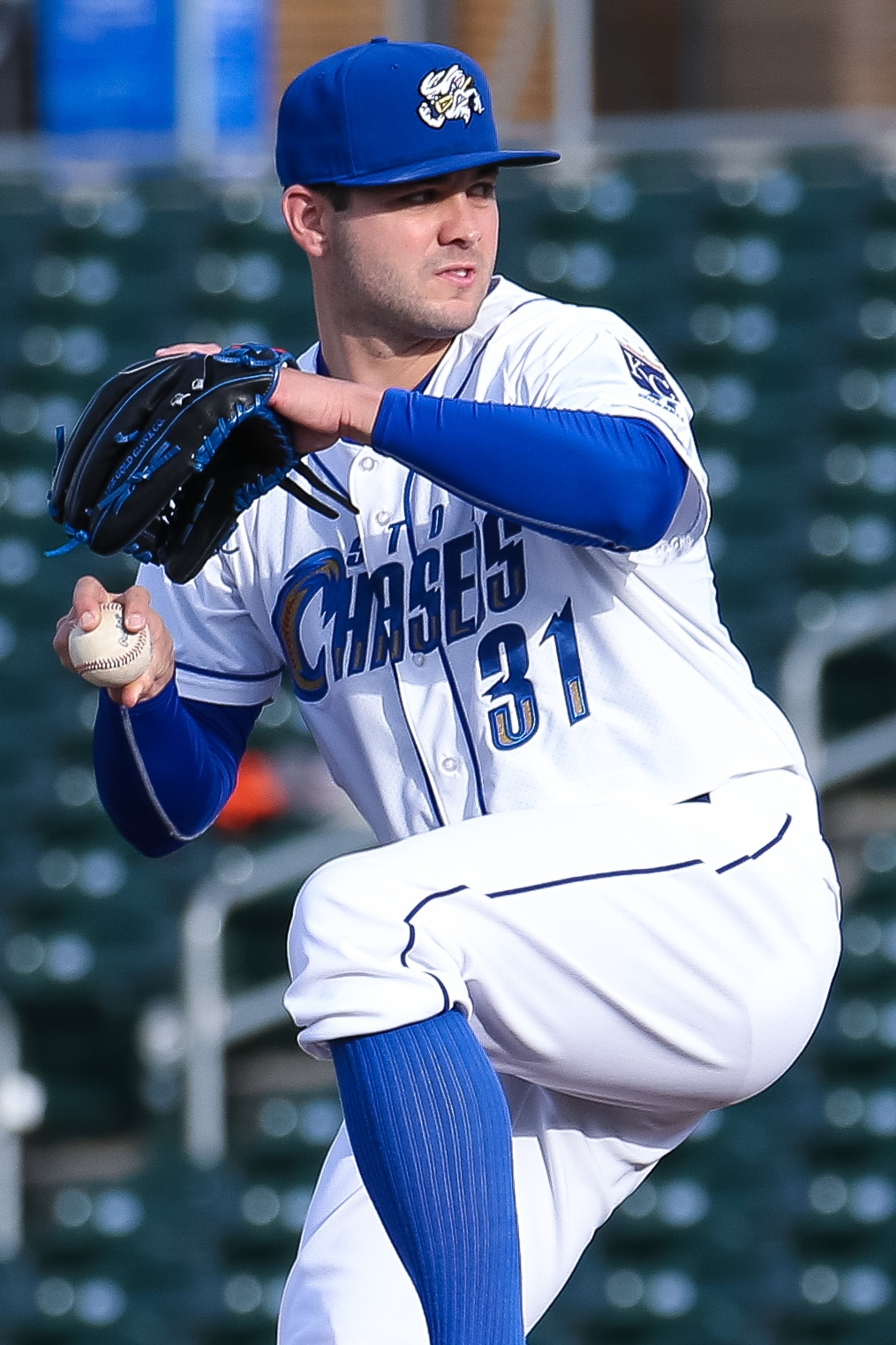
- Junis with the Omaha Storm Chasers in 2017

Free agent
- Pitcher
- Born: September 16, 1992 (age 34); Jacksonville, Arkansas, U.S.
- Bats: Right Throws: Right

MLB debut
- April 12, 2017, for the Kansas City Royals

MLB statistics (through 2026 season)
- Win–loss record: 47–49
- Earned run average: 4.31
- Strikeouts: 806
- Stats at Baseball Reference

Teams
- Kansas City Royals (2017–2021); San Francisco Giants (2022–2023); Milwaukee Brewers (2024); Cincinnati Reds (2024); Cleveland Guardians (2025); Texas Rangers (2026)

Jakob Benjamin Lee Junis (born September 16, 1992) is an American professional baseball pitcher who is a free agent. He has played in Major League Baseball (MLB) for the Kansas City Royals, San Francisco Giants, Milwaukee Brewers, Cincinnati Reds, Cleveland Guardians, and Texas Rangers. He made his MLB debut in 2017.

== Amateur career ==
Junis attended Rock Falls High School in Rock Falls, Illinois, and graduated in 2011. There, he earned all-state honors in both baseball and basketball. As a senior, in basketball he averaged 19 points a game. In baseball he threw an 88–92-mile-per-hour (142–148 km/h) fastball and had a 1.10 earned run average (ERA) and 93 strikeouts as a pitcher, while batting .485 with 54 runs batted in.

The Kansas City Royals selected Junis in the 29th round of the 2011 Major League Baseball draft. He had committed to play college baseball at North Carolina State University as an infielder and a pitcher, and though he was rated as a fourth round pick he fell to the 29th round because of his scholarship to North Carolina State. But he signed with the Royals for a $675,000 signing bonus instead of attending college.

== Professional career ==
=== Kansas City Royals ===
Junis made his professional debut in 2012 with the Burlington Royals with whom he went 2–2 with a 4.15 ERA in seven games (six starts). He pitched in 2013 with the Idaho Falls Chukars, posted a 2–6 record and 7.39 ERA in 13 starts, and was 8th in the Pioneer League with 55 strikeouts.

In 2014 he played with the Lexington Legends, and had a 9–8 record and 4.30 ERA with 10 hit batsmen (5th in the South Atlantic League) and a WHIP of 1.28 (10th in the league) in 26 games (22 starts). Junis pitched for the Wilmington Blue Rocks (with whom he was 2nd in the Carolina League with 123 strikeouts, and third in WHIP (1.12)) and Northwest Arkansas Naturals in 2015, where he compiled a combined 5–12 record and 3.78 ERA in 27 starts.

He started 2016 with Northwest Arkansas, for whom he was 9-7 with a 3.25 ERA (3rd in the Texas League) and 117 strikeouts (6th in the league) in 21 starts, was 4th in the league in WHIP (1.15), and was a Texas League Mid-Season All Star and Post-Season All Star. In August he was promoted to the Omaha Storm Chasers, with whom he had six starts. In 27 combined starts between Northwest Arkansas and Omaha he was 10–10 with a 4.05 ERA, and 143 strikeouts and 34 walks in 149 innings, as he generally threw a fastball in the low-90s and occasionally slightly higher, a change-up, and a curveball. He was named an MiLB.com Organization All Star. The Royals added him to their 40-man roster after the 2016 season.

Junis made his MLB debut on April 12, 2017. After his debut, he was recalled and optioned a number of times before he was called up to Kansas City for the remainder of the season on August 14. In 12 starts for Omaha he was 3–5 with a 2.92 ERA, in 20 games (16 starts). For Kansas City, he compiled a 9–3 record and 4.30 ERA, as his 9 hit batsmen were 10th-most in the league.

Junis began 2018 in Kansas City's starting rotation. He finished the season with a 9–12 record, a complete game, and a 4.37 ERA in 30 starts, and was 3rd in the AL in hit batsmen (15; a team record), 8th in walks per 9 innings (2.186), and 10th in strikeouts/walk (3.814) and wild pitches (9).

In 2019 for the Royals, Junis pitched to a 5.24 ERA with a 8.4 K/9 and 3.0 BB/9 in 175 1/3 innings across 31 starts, and was 6th in the AL with 11 hit batsmen. He became the first pitcher in the major leagues to win at least nine games in each of his first three seasons since Masahiro Tanaka (2014–16); the last pitcher younger than Junis to do that was Gerrit Cole (2013–15).

With the 2020 Kansas City Royals, Junis appeared in eight games (six starts). He compiled an 0-2 record with a 6.39 ERA and 6 walks and 19 strikeouts in 25.1 innings pitched. He was on the injured list twice.

Junis made 16 appearances (six starts) for the Royals in 2021, posting a 5.26 ERA with 41 strikeouts in 39.1 innings of work, and was on the injured list twice. His salary was $1.7 million. On November 5, 2021, Junis was outrighted off of the 40-man roster, but rejected the outright assignment and elected free agency.

=== San Francisco Giants ===
On March 14, 2022, Junis signed a one-year $1.75 million deal with the San Francisco Giants. In 2022 with the Giants, he was 5-7 with a 4.42 ERA in 112 innings, as in 23 games (17 starts) he walked 25 batters and had 98 strikeouts. In 15 1/3 innings split between the Triple–A Sacramento River Cats and rookie–level Arizona Complex League Giants, Junis accumulated a 7.04 ERA with 13 strikeouts.

On January 13, 2023, Junis agreed to a one-year, $2.8 million contract with the Giants, avoiding salary arbitration. He made 40 appearances for San Francisco in 2023, recording a 3.87 ERA with 96 strikeouts across 86 innings pitched.

=== Milwaukee Brewers ===
On February 7, 2024, Junis signed a one-year $7 million contract with the Milwaukee Brewers that contained a mutual option for a second year. After one start, he was placed on the injured list with a right shoulder impingement on April 6. On April 22, Junis was hospitalized after being hit in the neck with a ball during batting practice. He was transferred to the 60–day injured list on May 6. Junis was activated from the injured list on June 21. He made 10 appearances for Milwaukee in 2024, recording a 2.42 ERA with 19 strikeouts across 26 innings pitched.

=== Cincinnati Reds ===
On July 30, 2024, the Brewers traded Junis, Joey Wiemer, and cash considerations to the Cincinnati Reds in exchange for Frankie Montas. In 14 appearances for Cincinnati, he recorded a 2.85 ERA with 32 strikeouts over 41 innings of work. On November 1, Junis declined his share of an option for the 2025 season and became a free agent.

=== Cleveland Guardians ===
On February 16, 2025, Junis signed a one-year, $4.5 million contract with the Cleveland Guardians. He made 57 relief appearances for the Guardians, compiling a 4-1 record and 2.97 ERA with 55 strikeouts across 66 2/3 innings pitched. Junis elected free agency at the conclusion of the season on November 2.

=== Texas Rangers ===
On January 20, 2026, Junis signed a one-year, $4 million contract with the Texas Rangers. On October 30, the Rangers declined their option on Junis making him a free agent.

== Personal life ==
Junis and his wife, Brianne, have three children together. They reside in Scottsdale, Arizona.
