= Humberto Arteaga =

Venezuelan baseball player (born 1994)

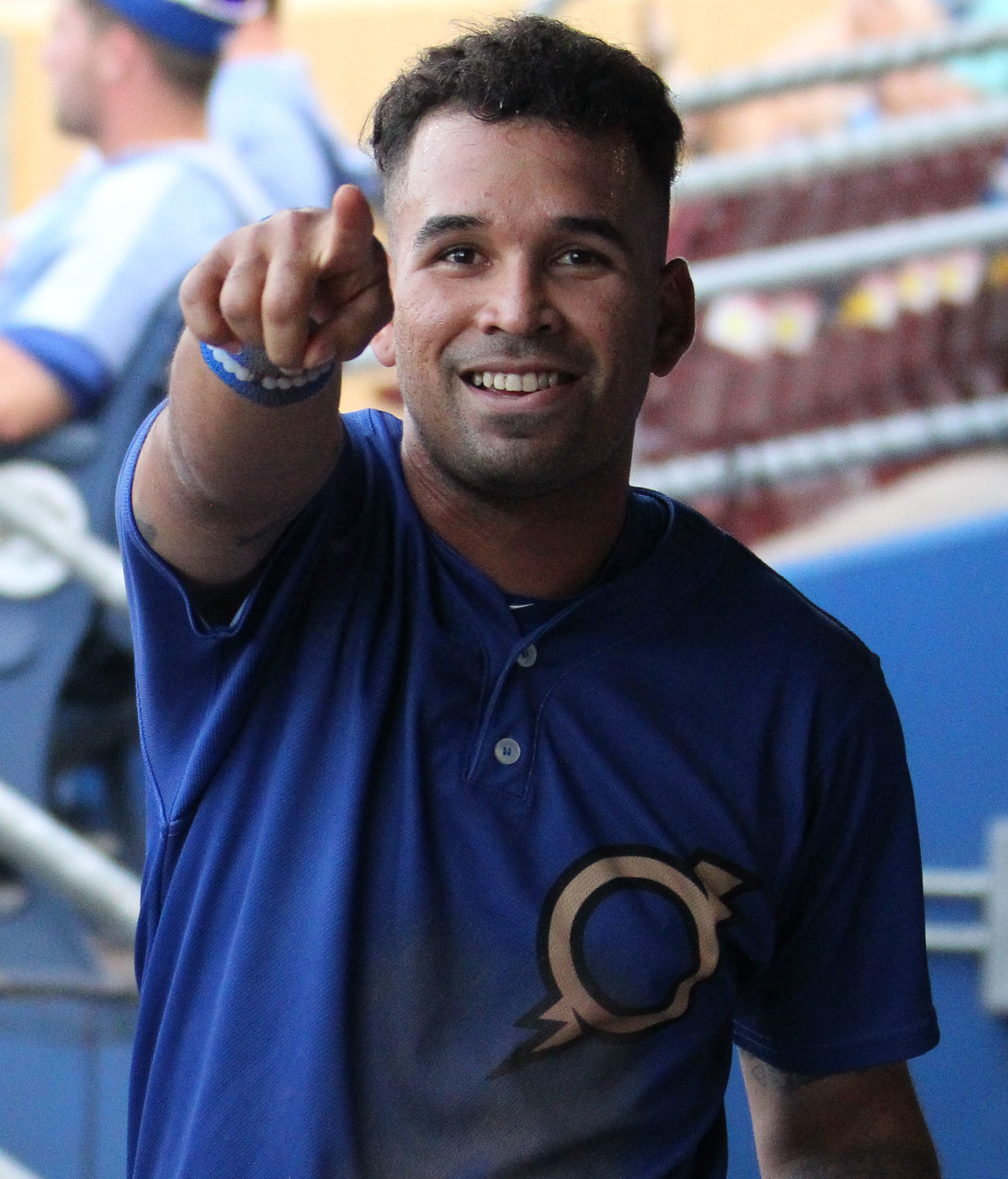
- Arteaga with the Omaha Storm Chasers in 2019
- Infielder
- Born: January 23, 1994 (age 32); Caracas, Venezuela
- Batted: Right Threw: Right

MLB debut
- June 20, 2019, for the Kansas City Royals

Last MLB appearance
- July 2, 2021, for the Washington Nationals

MLB statistics
- Batting average: .192
- Home runs: 0
- Runs batted in: 5
- Stats at Baseball Reference

Teams
- Kansas City Royals (2019); Washington Nationals (2021)

Humberto Jose Arteaga (born January 23, 1994) is a Venezuelan former professional baseball infielder. He played in Major League Baseball (MLB) for the Kansas City Royals and Washington Nationals.

== Career ==
=== Kansas City Royals ===
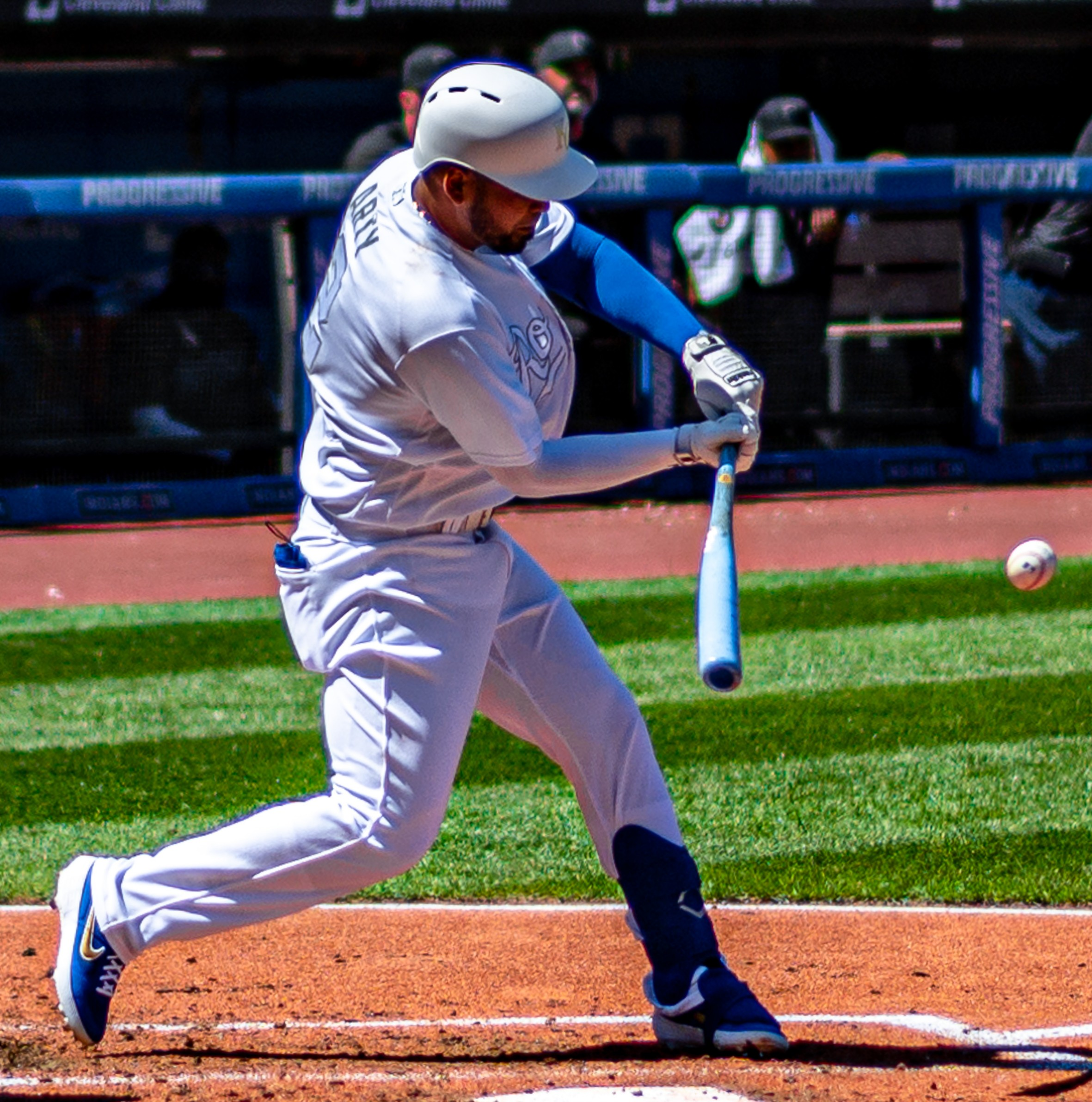
Arteaga with the Royals in 2019

Arteaga signed with the Kansas City Royals as an international free agent on November 20, 2010. He made his professional debut in 2011 with the rookie-level AZL Royals. He spent the 2012 season with the rookie-level Burlington Royals, slashing .274/.313/.380 in 58 games. He split the 2013 season between the rookie-level Idaho Falls Chukars and the Single-A Lexington Legends, accumulating a .239/.283/.319 batting line with 3 home runs and 71 RBI. He returned to Lexington the following season, hitting .198/.231/.249 in 122 games with the team. In 2015, he split the year between Lexington and the High-A Wilmington Blue Rocks, posting a .249/.287/.312 slash line with 2 home runs and 44 RBI. His 2016 season was split between Wilmington and the Double-A Northwest Arkansas Naturals. In 125 games between the two teams, Arteaga recorded a .252/.271/.311 slash with 2 home runs and 35 RBI. He returned to Northwest Arkansas the following year, batting .258/.300/.305 with 1 home run and 35 RBI in 124 contests. He spent the 2018 season with the Triple-A Omaha Storm Chasers, hitting .292/.322/.386 with career-highs in home runs (6) and RBI (49). He began the 2019 season back with Omaha.

The Royals selected Arteaga's contract and promoted him to the major leagues for the first time on June 20, 2019. He made his debut that night versus the Minnesota Twins. He finished his rookie season with a .197/.258/.230 slash line with no home runs and 4 RBI in 41 games.

On December 2, 2019, Arteaga was non-tendered by Kansas City and became a free agent, but re-signed with the Royals on a minor league contract on December 17. Arteaga did not play in a game in 2020 due to the cancellation of the minor league season because of the COVID-19 pandemic. Arteaga was released by the Royals on September 6, 2020.

=== Washington Nationals ===
On February 4, 2021, Arteaga signed a minor league contract with the Washington Nationals organization. He was assigned to the Double-A Harrisburg Senators to begin the year, later receiving a promotion to the Triple-A Rochester Red Wings. Injuries to middle infielders Trea Turner and Jordy Mercer created an opening on the major league roster, and on July 2, Arteaga had his contract purchased. Arteaga started at shortstop that night against the Los Angeles Dodgers, going 0-for-3 with an RBI. The following day, the Nationals selected major league veteran Alcides Escobar to the roster, and designated Arteaga for assignment. On July 5, Arteaga cleared waivers and was sent outright to Rochester. He elected free agency following the season on November 7.

== See also ==
- List of Major League Baseball players from Venezuela
