= Kelvin Gutiérrez =

Dominican baseball player (born 1994)

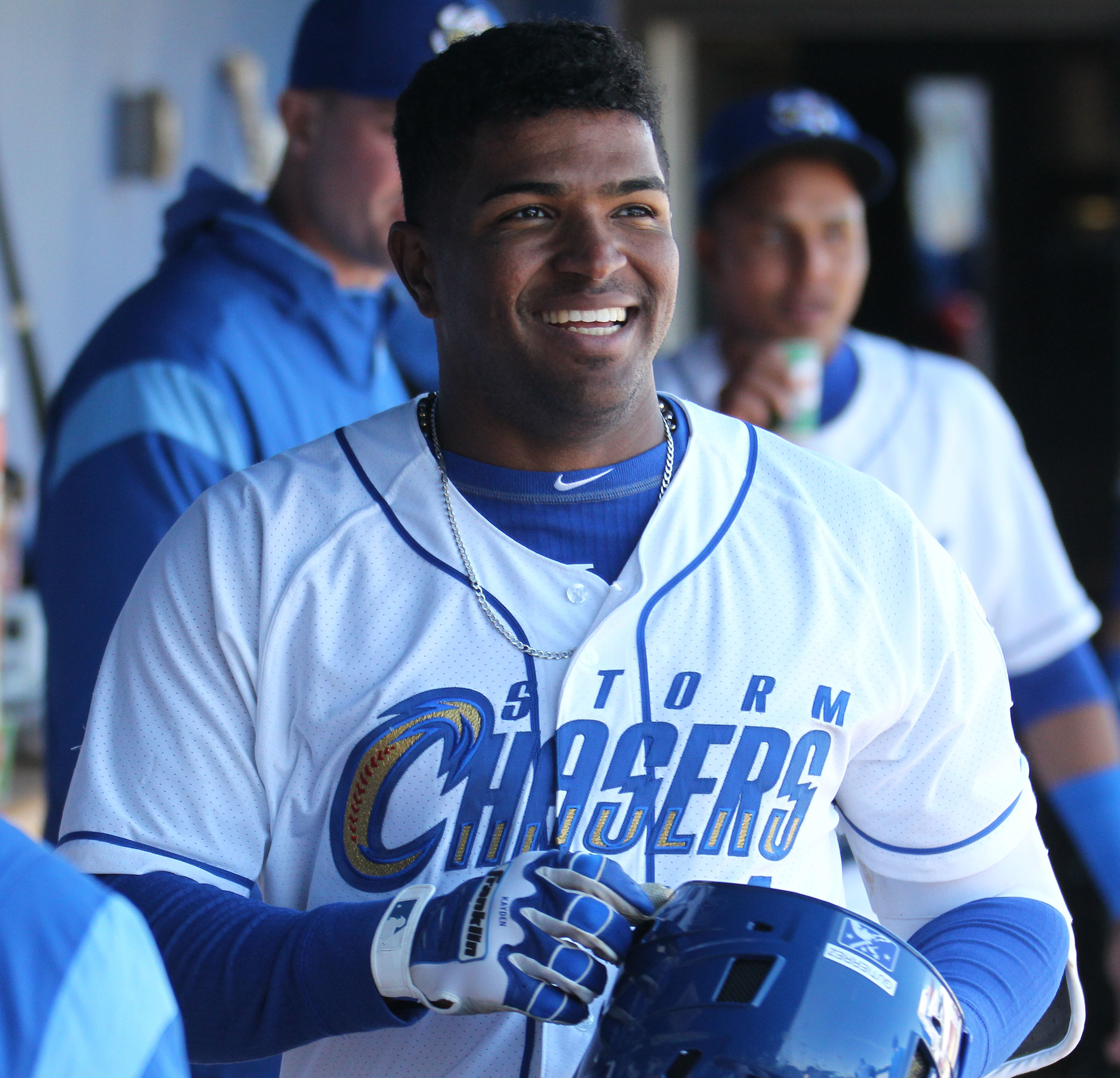
- Gutiérrez with the Omaha Storm Chasers in 2019

Conspiradores de Querétaro – No. 39
- Third baseman
- Born: August 28, 1994 (age 32); San Francisco de Macorís, Dominican Republic
- Bats: Right Throws: Right

MLB debut
- April 27, 2019, for the Kansas City Royals

MLB statistics (through 2022 season)
- Batting average: .228
- Home runs: 4
- Runs batted in: 34
- Stats at Baseball Reference

Teams
- Kansas City Royals (2019–2021); Baltimore Orioles (2021–2022)

Kelvin Manuel Gutiérrez (born August 28, 1994) is a Dominican professional baseball third basemen for the Conspiradores de Querétaro of the Mexican League. He has previously played in Major League Baseball (MLB) for the Kansas City Royals and Baltimore Orioles.

== Career ==
=== Washington Nationals ===
Gutiérrez was signed out of the Dominican Republic as an international free agent by the Washington Nationals organization on April 10, 2013. While signed as a shortstop, the Nationals moved him to third base as his primary position. He made his professional debut in 2013 with the DSL Nationals, batting .255 in 60 games. In 2014, he played for the GCL Nationals where he compiled a .286 batting average with 25 RBIs in 53 games, and in 2015, he played for the Auburn Doubledays where he slashed .305/.358/.414 with one home run and 30 RBIs in 62 games. He spent 2016 with the Hagerstown Suns where he batted .300/.349/.406 with three home runs, 48 RBIs, and 19 stolen bases in 96 games. He also played in ten games for the Potomac Nationals at the end of the season.

In 2017, Baseball America ranked him as having the best infield arm in the Nationals organization. He was assigned to Potomac to begin the 2017 season. After ranking as the Nationals' 26th-best prospect midway through the 2016 season, Gutiérrez catapulted to the 12th spot in the system by mid-2017, according to MLB Pipeline. He was named to participate in the Carolina League All-Star Game in 2017, although he was unable to play due to an injury suffered June 9 while running the bases. He spent all of 2017 with Potomac, hitting .288 with two home runs and 16 RBIs in only 58 games due to injury. After the 2017 season ended, Gutiérrez played for the Mesa Solar Sox of the Arizona Fall League, leading the team in hitting with a .350 average. The Nationals added Gutiérrez to their 40-man roster after the 2017 season. He began 2018 with the Harrisburg Senators of the Class AA Eastern League.

=== Kansas City Royals ===
On June 18, 2018, the Nationals traded Gutiérrez, Blake Perkins, and Yohanse Morel to the Kansas City Royals in exchange for Kelvin Herrera. Gutiérrez began the 2019 season with the Omaha Storm Chasers of the Triple–A Pacific Coast League. After batting .333 with two home runs and 10 RBIs in 18 games for Omaha, he made his major league debut on April 27, 2019. For his rookie season, Gutiérrez batted .260/.394/.356 in 20 games.

Overall with the 2020 Kansas City Royals, Gutiérrez batted .111 with no home runs and 0 RBIs in 4 games.

After beginning the 2021 season with Triple-A Omaha, Gutiérrez was recalled on May 14 for the second game of a doubleheader, after third baseman Hunter Dozier was placed on the 7-day concussion injured list. He was used as a pinch-hitter that night, and received his first start at third base the following night. Gutiérrez started the next 10 games at third base, batting .270, and continued to be the starter upon Dozier's activation from the injured list on May 28. However, he hit just .194 in his next 27 games, and was designated for assignment on June 28.

=== Baltimore Orioles ===
On July 3, 2021, Gutiérrez was traded to the Baltimore Orioles in exchange for cash considerations and assigned to the Triple-A Norfolk Tides. On July 7, he made his Orioles debut against the Toronto Blue Jays as a pinch hitter, drawing a walk, and became the first player in franchise history to wear the number 82. Gutiérrez played in 47 games for Baltimore down the stretch as their primary third baseman, batting .248/.327/.336 with 2 home runs and 12 RBI.

Gutiérrez made Baltimore's Opening Day roster in 2022, serving as a reserve infielder while Ramón Urías handled the lion's share of work at third base. After struggling to a .143/.250/.179 slash with no home runs and 3 RBI in 12 contests, he was designated for assignment on May 2, 2022, when active rosters shrank from 28 to 26. On May 6, Gutiérrez cleared waivers and was sent outright to Triple-A Norfolk. Gutiérrez was released by the Orioles on September 15, 2022.

=== Pericos de Puebla ===
On May 9, 2023, Gutiérrez signed with the Pericos de Puebla of the Mexican League. In 18 appearances for Puebla, he batted .210/.250/.323 with two home runs and 13 RBI. Gutiérrez was released by the Pericos on June 2.

=== Conspiradores de Querétaro ===
On March 4, 2024, Gutiérrez signed with the Conspiradores de Querétaro of the Mexican League. In 87 appearances for México, he batted .333/.408/.495 with 11 home runs, 70 RBI, and six stolen bases.

Gutiérrez made 80 appearances for the Conspiradores during the 2025 campaign, slashing .345/.418/.595 with 19 home runs, 67 RBI, and three stolen bases.
