= Edward Olivares =

Venezuelan baseball player (born 1996)

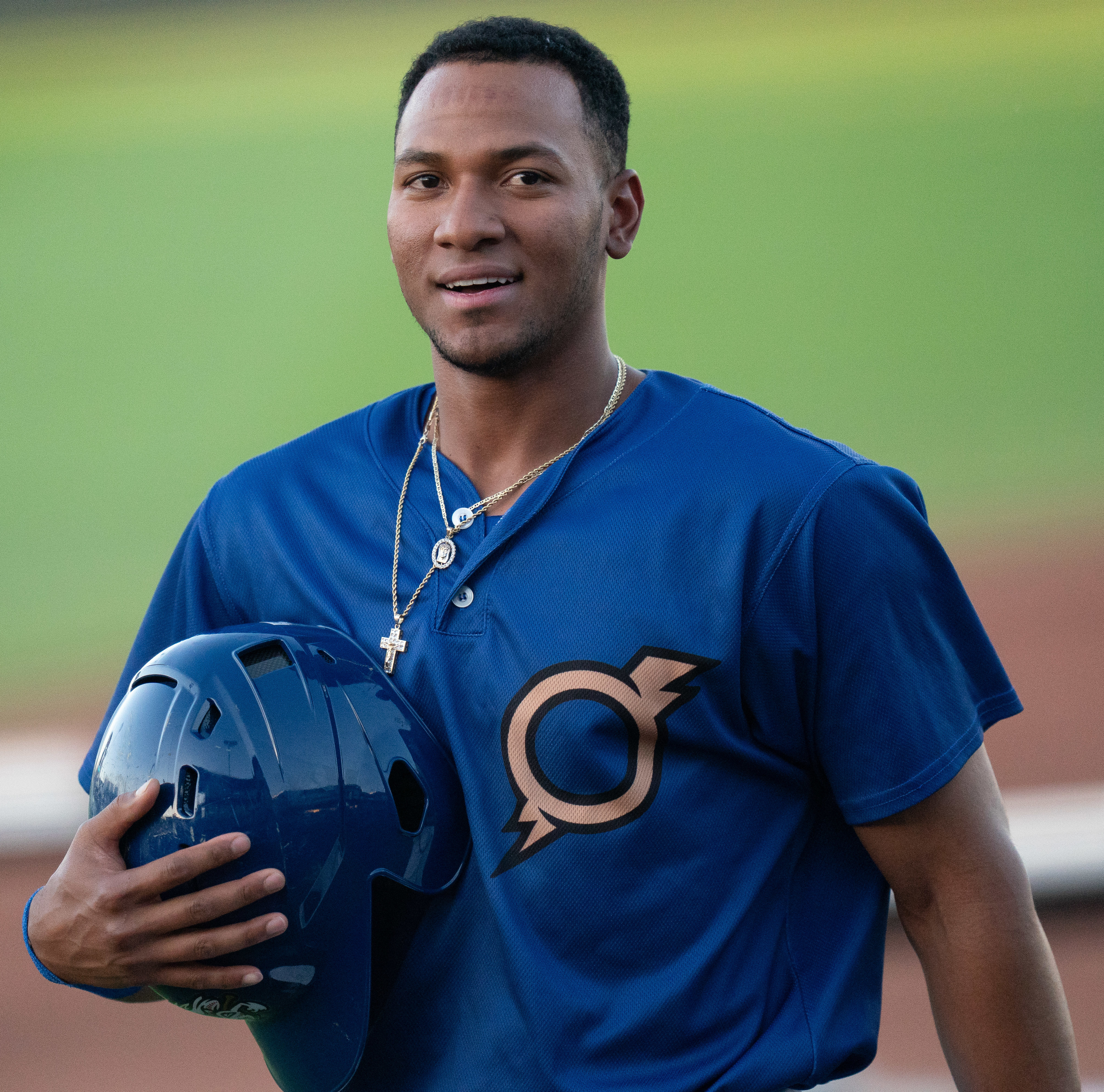
- Olivares with the Omaha Storm Chasers in 2021

Algodoneros de Unión Laguna – No. 53
- Outfielder
- Born: March 6, 1996 (age 30); Caracas, Venezuela
- Bats: Right Throws: Right

Professional debut
- MLB: July 25, 2020, for the San Diego Padres
- NPB: March 28, 2025, for the Orix Buffaloes

MLB statistics (through 2024 season)
- Batting average: .254
- Home runs: 29
- Runs batted in: 96

NPB statistics (through 2025 season)
- Batting average: .182
- Home runs: 0
- Runs batted in: 0
- Stats at Baseball Reference

Teams
- San Diego Padres (2020); Kansas City Royals (2020–2023); Pittsburgh Pirates (2024); Orix Buffaloes (2025)

Edward Olivares (born March 6, 1996) is a Venezuelan professional baseball outfielder for the Algodoneros de Unión Laguna of the Mexican League. He has previously played in Major League Baseball (MLB) for the San Diego Padres, Kansas City Royals, and Pittsburgh Pirates, and in Nippon Professional Baseball (NPB) for the Orix Buffaloes.

== Career ==
=== Toronto Blue Jays ===
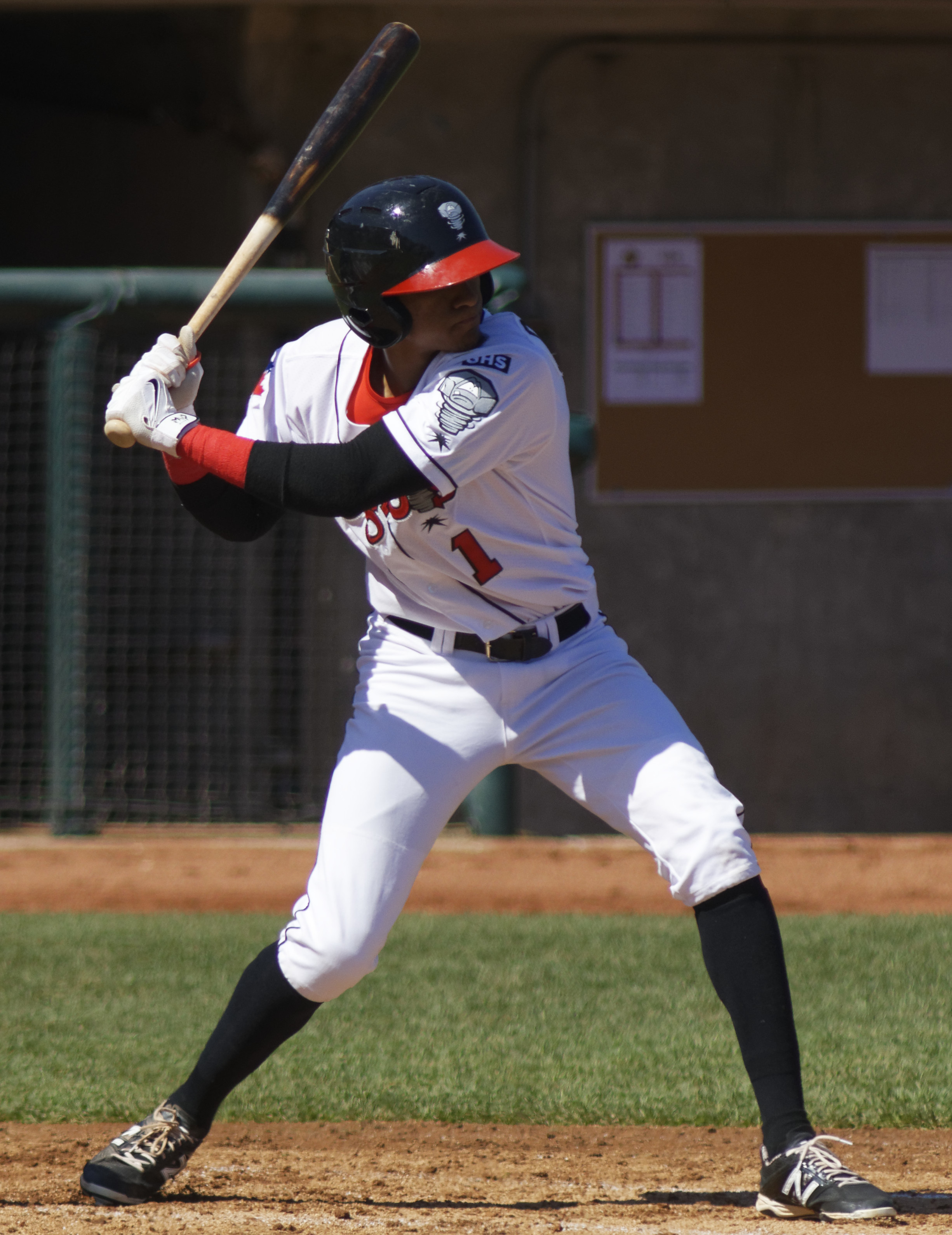
Olivares with the Lansing Lugnuts in 2017

Olivares was signed by the Toronto Blue Jays as an international free agent on July 2, 2014. He made his professional debut in 2014 with the Dominican Summer League Blue Jays, hitting .314/.436/.414 with one home run and 22 RBI. Olivares played for the Gulf Coast League Blue Jays in 2015, hitting .198/.345/.362 with three home runs and 10 RBI. In 2016, he played just 15 game for the Bluefield Blue Jays, hitting .273/.339/.418 with one home run and six RBI. Olivares split the 2017 season between the Lansing Lugnuts and the Dunedin Blue Jays, hitting a combined .269/.327/.468 with 17 home runs and 72 RBI.

=== San Diego Padres ===
On January 6, 2018, Olivares and Jared Carkuff were traded to the San Diego Padres in exchange for Yangervis Solarte. He spent the 2018 season with the Lake Elsinore Storm, hitting .277/.321/.429 with 12 home runs and 62 RBI. After the season, The Padres added him to their 40-man roster.

In 2019, Olivares spent the season with the Amarillo Sod Poodles, slashing .283/.349/.453 with 18 home runs, 77 RBI, and 35 stolen bases over 127 games.

Olivares made his major league debut on July 25, 2020, against the Arizona Diamondbacks, hitting a double over 3 at-bats.

=== Kansas City Royals ===
On August 29, 2020, the Padres traded Olivares and a player to be named later to the Kansas City Royals, in exchange for relief pitcher Trevor Rosenthal. Overall with the 2020 Kansas City Royals, Olivares batted .274 with two home runs and seven RBI in 18 games.

Olivares began the 2021 season in Triple-A with the Omaha Storm Chasers. He was shuttled back and forth between Triple-A and the Royals throughout the season. He appeared in 39 games for the Royals, slashing .238/.291/.406 with 5 home runs, 12 RBI, and 2 stolen bases.

On June 24, 2022, Olivares hit two home runs in a game against the Oakland Athletics in his return from injury. On August 4, Olivares was placed on the 60-day injured list with a left quadriceps strain. He was activated on September 17. Through 53 games, he hit .286 with 4 home runs and 15 RBI.

In 2023, Olivares played in 107 games for Kansas City, batting .263/.317/.452 with 12 home runs, 36 RBI, and 11 stolen bases.

=== Pittsburgh Pirates ===
On December 15, 2023, Olivares was traded to the Pittsburgh Pirates in exchange for Deivis Nadal. He played in 55 games for the Pirates in 2024, slashing .224/.291/.333 with five home runs and 23 RBI. On August 8, 2024, Olivares was designated for assignment by Pittsburgh. He cleared waivers and was sent outright to the Triple–A Indianapolis Indians on August 10. Olivares elected free agency on October 2.

=== Orix Buffaloes ===
On December 6, 2024, Olivares signed a minor league contract with the New York Mets. However, he was released by the Mets organization on January 17, 2025. Following his release, Olivares signed with the Orix Buffaloes of Nippon Professional Baseball. He made 11 appearances for the Buffaloes, slashing .182/.229/.212 with one stolen base and two walks. Olivares became a free agent following the season.

=== Tampa Bay Rays ===
On January 7, 2026, Olivares signed a minor league contract with the Tampa Bay Rays. He made three appearances for the Triple-A Durham Bulls, going 1-for-9 (.111) with one walk. Olivares was released by the Rays organization on April 11.

=== Algodoneros de Unión Laguna ===
On May 31, 2026, Olivares signed with the Algodoneros de Unión Laguna of the Mexican League.
