= Jake Newberry =

American baseball player (born 1994)

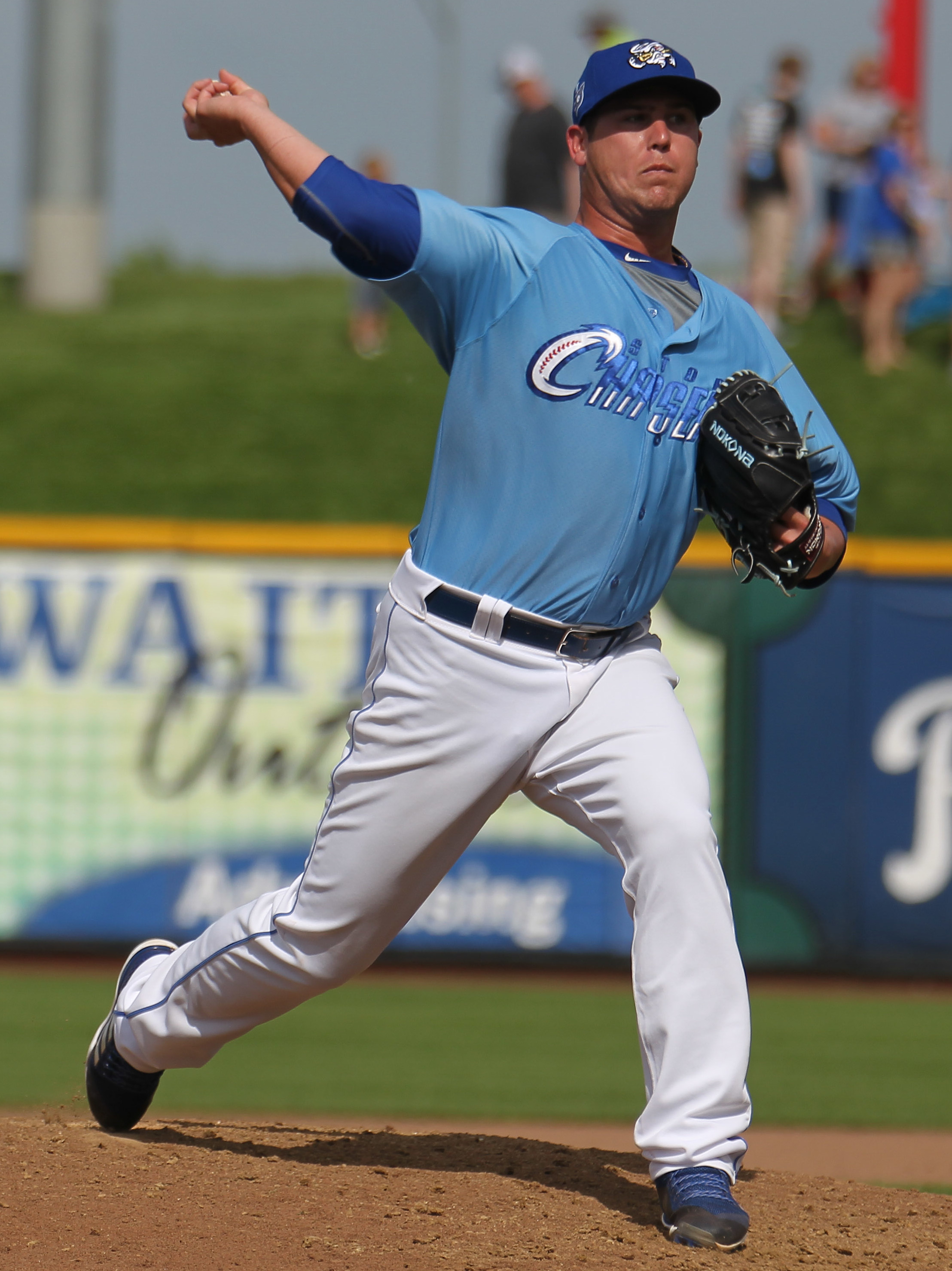
- Newberry with the Omaha Storm Chasers in 2018
- Pitcher
- Born: November 20, 1994 (age 31); San Diego, California, U.S.
- Batted: Right Threw: Right

MLB debut
- August 20, 2018, for the Kansas City Royals

Last MLB appearance
- May 2, 2021, for the Kansas City Royals

MLB statistics
- Win–loss record: 4–0
- Earned run average: 4.84
- Strikeouts: 69
- Stats at Baseball Reference

Teams
- Kansas City Royals (2018–2021)

Christopher Jake Newberry (born November 20, 1994) is an American former professional baseball pitcher. He played in Major League Baseball (MLB) for the Kansas City Royals.

== Career ==
=== Amateur career ===
Newberry attended Mira Mesa Senior High School in San Diego, California. The Kansas City Royals selected him in the 37th round of the 2012 MLB draft while he was in class. He signed with the Royals, beginning his professional career.

=== Kansas City Royals ===
Newberry made his professional debut that season with the Arizona League Royals, going 1-0 with a 2.81 ERA over 16 innings. He spent 2013 with the Burlington Royals, going 1-1 with a 2.68 ERA over 11 games (six starts), 2014 with the Idaho Falls Chukars in which he went 6-4 with a 4.50 ERA over 68 innings, and 2015 with the Lexington Legends, going 4-2 with a 5.04 ERA 35 relief appearances. Newberry spent 2016 with both Lexington and the Wilmington Blue Rocks, compiling a combined 3-2 record and 2.57 ERA over 35 games, and 2017 with the Northwest Arkansas Naturals and the Omaha Storm Chasers, going 6-4 with a 2.61 ERA over 62 relief innings. He returned to Northwest Arkansas and Omaha in 2018, going 5-0 with a 1.63 ERA over 41 relief appearances.

The Royals promoted Newberry to the major leagues on August 18, 2018. He made his major league debut on August 20. He finished his rookie season with a 4.73 ERA across 14 appearances.

In 2019 with the Royals, Newberry recorded a 3.77 ERA with 29 strikeouts in 27 games. With the 2020 Kansas City Royals, Newberry appeared in 20 games, compiling a 1-0 record with 4.09 ERA and 24 strikeouts in 22.0 innings pitched.

In 2021, Newberry struggled to a 16.62 ERA across 4 appearances for the Royals, and was designated for assignment following the promotion of Jackson Kowar on June 7, 2021. He was outrighted to Triple-A Omaha on June 10.

=== Philadelphia Phillies ===
On December 14, 2021, Newberry signed a minor league contract with the Philadelphia Phillies. He made 19 appearances (four starts) for the Triple-A Lehigh Valley IronPigs in 2012, compiling a 1-1 record and 3.46 ERA with 15 strikeouts over 26 innings of work. On July 24, 2022, Newberry was released by the Phillies organization.

=== Generales de Durango ===
On June 26, 2023, Newberry signed with the Generales de Durango of the Mexican League. In 6 games for Durango, he struggled to a 9.64 ERA with 2 strikeouts across 4 2/3 innings pitched. On July 12, he was released by the team.

=== Chicago Dogs ===
On July 21, 2023, Newberry signed with the Chicago Dogs of the American Association of Professional Baseball. Newberry would become a free agent after the 2023 season. In 19 games 24.2 innings of relief he went 2-0 with a 1.82 era and 29 strikeouts.

== Personal ==
Newberry and his wife, Tiffany, were married in November 2019.
