= 2020 Kansas City Royals season =

52nd season in franchise history, first under ownership of John Sherman

2020 Kansas City Royals
- League: American League
- Division: Central
- Ballpark: Kauffman Stadium
- City: Kansas City, Missouri
- Record: 26–34 (.433)
- Divisional place: 4th
- Owners: John Sherman
- General managers: Dayton Moore
- Managers: Mike Matheny
- Television: Fox Sports Kansas City (Ryan Lefebvre, Jeff Montgomery, Rex Hudler, Steve Physioc)
- Radio: KCSP 610 AM (Denny Matthews, Steve Stewart, Rex Hudler, Ryan Lefebvre, Steve Physioc, Jeff Montgomery)

The 2020 Kansas City Royals season was the 52nd season for the franchise, and their 48th at Kauffman Stadium. The 2020 season was the first under new owner John Sherman, whose purchase of the team was approved by MLB on November 21, 2019. It was also the first season under manager Mike Matheny, replacing Ned Yost after having a ten-season tenure. The team finished with a 26–34 win–loss record, landing them fourth place in the American League Central.

On March 12, 2020, MLB announced that because of the ongoing COVID-19 pandemic, the start of the regular season would be delayed by at least two weeks in addition to the remainder of spring training being cancelled. Four days later, it was announced that the start of the season would be pushed back indefinitely due to the recommendation made by the CDC to restrict events of more than 50 people for eight weeks. On June 23, commissioner Rob Manfred unilaterally implemented a 60-game season. Players reported to training camps on July 1 in order to resume spring training and prepare for a July 24 Opening Day.

== Offseason ==
- November 2, 2019: Alex Gordon (OF) elected free agency.
- November 5, 2019: Trevor Oaks (P) claimed off waivers by San Francisco.
- November 6, 2019: Jacob Barnes (P) released.
- November 20, 2019: Jorge Bonifacio (OF) (released 11/25), Nick Dini (C), Conner Greene (P), and Arnaldo Hernandez (P) designated for assignment.
- November 20, 2019: Foster Griffin (P), Carlos Hernandez (P), Nick Heath (OF), and Jeison Guzmán (SS) added to 40-man roster.
- December 2, 2019: Cheslor Cuthbert (1B/3B), Humberto Arteaga (INF), Jesse Hahn (P), and Erick Mejia (INF) elected free agency.
- December 12, 2019: Selected Stephen Woods from the Tampa Bay Rays in the Rule 5 draft.
- December 13, 2019: Signed free agent Jesse Hahn (P) to a major league contract.
- December 23, 2019: Traded Cristian Perez (INF) to the New York Yankees for Chance Adams (P).
- December 27, 2019: Finalized signing of free agent Maikel Franco.
- January 22, 2020: Signed free agent Alex Gordon (OF) and designated Heath Fillmyer (P) for assignment.
- March 25, 2020: Selected the contract of Trevor Rosenthal (P) and designated Eric Skoglund (P) for assignment.

== Season standings ==
=== American League Central ===
AL Central
Team	W	L	Pct.	GB	Home	Road
Minnesota Twins	36	24	.600	—	24‍–‍7	12‍–‍17
Cleveland Indians	35	25	.583	1	18‍–‍12	17‍–‍13
Chicago White Sox	35	25	.583	1	18‍–‍12	17‍–‍13
Kansas City Royals	26	34	.433	10	15‍–‍15	11‍–‍19
Detroit Tigers	23	35	.397	12	12‍–‍15	11‍–‍20

=== American League Wild Card ===
Division leaders
Team	W	L	Pct.
Tampa Bay Rays	40	20	.667
Oakland Athletics	36	24	.600
Minnesota Twins	36	24	.600

Division 2nd place
Team	W	L	Pct.
Cleveland Indians	35	25	.583
New York Yankees	33	27	.550
Houston Astros	29	31	.483

Wild Card teams (Top 2 teams qualify for postseason)
Team	W	L	Pct.	GB
Chicago White Sox	35	25	.583	+3
Toronto Blue Jays	32	28	.533	—
Seattle Mariners	27	33	.450	5
Los Angeles Angels	26	34	.433	6
Kansas City Royals	26	34	.433	6
Baltimore Orioles	25	35	.417	7
Boston Red Sox	24	36	.400	8
Detroit Tigers	23	35	.397	8
Texas Rangers	22	38	.367	10

=== Record against opponents ===
2020 American League record Source: MLB Standings Grid – 2020
Team	CWS	CLE	DET	KC	MIN	NL
Chicago	—	2–8	9–1	9–1	5–5	10–10
Cleveland	8–2	—	7–3	5–5	3–7	12–8
Detroit	1–9	3–7	—	4–6	4–6	11–7
Kansas City	1–9	5–5	6–4	—	5–5	9–11
Minnesota	5–5	7–3	6–4	5–5	—	13–7

== Game log ==
2020 game log: 26–34 (Home: 15–15; Away: 11–19)
July: 3–5 (Home: 0–1; Away: 3–4)

#	Date	Opponent	Score	Win	Loss	Save	Record	Streak
1	July 24	@ Indians	0–2	Bieber (1–0)	**Duffy** (0–1)	Hand (1)	0–1	L1
2	July 25	@ Indians	3–2 (10)	**Barlow** (1–0)	Karinchak (0–1)	**Holland** (1)	1–1	W1
3	July 26	@ Indians	2–9	Carrasco (1–0)	**Bolaños** (0–1)	—	1–2	L1
4	July 27	@ Tigers	14–6	**Griffin** (1–0)	Funkhouser (0–1)	—	2–2	W1
5	July 28	@ Tigers	3–4	Alexander (1–0)	**Zuber** (0–1)	Jiménez (3)	2–3	L1
6	July 29	@ Tigers	4–5	Garcia (1–0)	**Kennedy** (0–1)	Jiménez (4)	2–4	L2
7	July 30	@ Tigers	5–3	**Holland** (1–0)	Cisnero (1–1)	**Rosenthal** (1)	3–4	W1
8	July 31	White Sox	2–3	Keuchel (2–0)	**Bubic** (0–1)	Colomé (1)	3–5	L1

August: 11–16 (Home: 7–6; Away: 4–10)

#	Date	Opponent	Score	Win	Loss	Save	Record	Streak
9	August 1	White Sox	5–11	Foster (1–0)	**Bolaños** (0–2)	Heuer (1)	3–6	L2
10	August 2	White Sox	2–9	Cease (1–1)	**Barlow** (1–1)	—	3–7	L3
11	August 3	@ Cubs	0–2	Mills (2–0)	**Duffy** (0–2)	Wick (2)	3–8	L4
12	August 4	@ Cubs	4–5	Hendricks (2–1)	**Singer** (0–1)	Ryan (1)	3–9	L5
13	August 5	Cubs	1–6	Darvish (2–1)	**Bubic** (0–2)	—	3–10	L6
14	August 6	Cubs	13–2	**Keller** (1–0)	Chatwood (2–1)	—	4–10	W1
15	August 7	Twins	3–2	**Holland** (2–0)	Wisler (0–1)	**Rosenthal** (2)	5–10	W2
16	August 8	Twins	9–6	**Zuber** (1–1)	Thorpe (0–1)	**Rosenthal** (3)	6–10	W3
17	August 9	Twins	4–2	**Singer** (1–1)	Berríos (1–2)	**Barlow** (1)	7–10	W4
18	August 11	@ Reds	5–6 (10)	Sims (1–0)	**Staumont** (0–1)	—	7–11	L1
19	August 12	@ Reds	5–4	**Keller** (2–0)	Miley (0–2)	**Rosenthal** (4)	8–11	W1
—	August 14	@ Twins	Postponed (inclement weather). Rescheduled to August 15.					
20	August 15 (1)	@ Twins	2–4 (7)	Duffey (1–0)	**Speier** (0–1)	Rogers (5)	8–12	L1
21	August 15 (2)	@ Twins	4–2 (7)	**Duffy** (1–2)	Berríos (1–3)	**Rosenthal** (5)	9–12	W1
22	August 16	@ Twins	2–4	Dobnak (4–1)	**Singer** (1–2)	Romo (3)	9–13	L1
23	August 17	@ Twins	1–4	Smeltzer (2–0)	**Bubic** (0–3)	—	9–14	L2
—	August 18	Reds	Postponed (COVID-19). Rescheduled to August 19.					
24	August 19 (1)	Reds	4–0 (7)	**Keller** (3–0)	Castillo (0–3)	**Rosenthal** (6)	10–14	W1
25	August 19 (2)	Reds	0–5 (7)	Bauer (3–0)	**Harvey** (0–1)	—	10–15	L1
26	August 21	Twins	7–2	**Duffy** (2–2)	Odorizzi (0–1)	—	11–15	W1
27	August 22	Twins	2–7	Dobnak (5–1)	**Singer** (1–3)	—	11–16	L1
28	August 23	Twins	4–5	Clippard (1–0	**Bubic** (0–4)	Rogers (6)	11–17	L2
29	August 24	@ Cardinals	3–9	Flaherty (2–0)	**Keller** (3–1)	—	11–18	L3
30	August 25	@ Cardinals	5–4	**Staumont** (1–1)	Gant (0–1)	**Rosenthal** (7)	12–18	W1
31	August 26	@ Cardinals	5–6	Reyes (1–0)	**Rosario** (0–1)	—	12–19	L1
32	August 28	@ White Sox	5–6	Colomé (1–0)	**Kennedy** (0–2)	—	12–20	L2
33	August 29	@ White Sox	9–6	**Newberry** (1–0)	Burdi (0–1)	**Hahn** (1)	13–20	W1
34	August 30	@ White Sox	2–5 (10)	Foster (3–0)	**Zuber** (1–2)	—	13–21	L1
35	August 31	Indians	2–1	**Barlow** (2–1)	Karinchak (0–2)	**Holland** (2)	14–21	W1

September: 12–13 (Home: 8–8; Away: 4–5)

#	Date	Opponent	Score	Win	Loss	Save	Record	Streak
36	September 1	Indians	1–10	Plesac (2–1)	**Harvey** (0–2)	—	14–22	L1
37	September 2	Indians	0–5	McKenzie (2–0)	**Junis** (0–1)	—	14–23	L2
38	September 3	White Sox	6–11	Cease (5–2)	**Duffy** (2–3)	—	14–24	L3
39	September 4	White Sox	4–7	Heuer (2–0)	**Singer** (1–4)	Colomé (8)	14–25	L4
40	September 5	White Sox	3–5	Giolito (4–2)	**Bubic** (0–5)	Colomé (9)	14–26	L5
41	September 6	White Sox	2–8	Keuchel (6–2)	**Harvey** (0–3)	—	14–27	L6
42	September 7	@ Indians	2–5	Plesac (3–1)	**Keller** (3–2)	Hand (12)	14–28	L7
43	September 8	@ Indians	8–5	**Holland** (3–0)	Cimber (0–1)	**Barlow** (2)	15–28	W1
44	September 9	@ Indians	3–0	**Duffy** (3–3)	Carrasco (2–4)	**Holland** (3)	16–28	W2
45	September 10	@ Indians	11–1	**Singer** (2–4)	Civale (3–5)	—	17–28	W3
46	September 11	Pirates	4–3	**Bubic** (1–5)	Brault (0–3)	**Holland** (4)	18–28	W4
47	September 12	Pirates	7–4	**Zimmer** (1–0)	Williams (1–7)	**Holland** (5)	19–28	W5
48	September 13	Pirates	11–0	**Keller** (4–2)	Kuhl (1–2)	—	20–28	W6
49	September 15	@ Tigers	0–6	Boyd (2–6)	**Junis** (0–2)	—	20–29	L1
50	September 16	@ Tigers	4–0	**Singer** (3–4)	Skubal (1–3)	—	21–29	W1
51	September 18	@ Brewers	5–9	Rasmussen (1–0)	**Duffy** (3–4)	—	21–30	L1
52	September 19	@ Brewers	0–5	Burnes (4–0)	**Bubic** (1–6)	—	21–31	L2
53	September 20	@ Brewers	3–5	Lindblom (2–3)	**Keller** (4–3)	Hader (10)	21–32	L3
54	September 21	Cardinals	4–1	**Staumont** (2–1)	Wainwright (5–2)	**Holland** (6)	22–32	W1
55	September 22	Cardinals	0–5	Gomber (1–1)	**Singer** (3–5)	—	22–33	L1
56	September 23	Cardinals	12–3	**Duffy** (4–4)	Martínez (0–3)	—	23–33	W1
57	September 24	Tigers	8–7	**Hahn** (1–0)	Alexander (2–3)	**Newberry** (1)	24–33	W2
58	September 25	Tigers	3–2	**Keller** (5–3)	Turnbull (4–4)	**Hahn** (2)	25–33	W3
59	September 26	Tigers	3–4	Boyd (3–7)	**Hernández** (0–1)	Garcia (4)	25–34	L1
60	September 27	Tigers	3–1	**Singer** (4–5)	Skubal (1–4)	**Hahn** (3)	26–34	W1

Legend: = Win = Loss = Postponement
Bold = Royals team member

== Roster ==
2020 Kansas City Royals
Roster
Pitchers: 48 Chance Adams; 58 Scott Barlow; 64 Scott Blewett; 54 Ronald Bolaños; 50 Kris Bubic; 41 Danny Duffy; 60 Foster Griffin; 32 Jesse Hahn; 33 Matt Harvey; 71 Carlos Hernández; 35 Greg Holland; 65 Jake Junis; 56 Brad Keller; 31 Ian Kennedy; 28 Jorge López; 55 Richard Lovelady; 61 Kevin McCarthy; 21 Mike Montgomery; 68 Jake Newberry; 43 Randy Rosario; 40 Trevor Rosenthal; 51 Brady Singer; 57 Glenn Sparkman; 67 Gabe Speier; 63 Josh Staumont; 45 Kyle Zimmer; 53 Tyler Zuber	Catchers: 36 Cam Gallagher; 18 Oscar Hernández; 13 Salvador Pérez; 72 Meibrys Viloria; Infielders: 17 Hunter Dozier; 7 Maikel Franco; 16 Kelvin Gutiérrez; 1 Nicky Lopez; 9 Ryan McBroom; 26 Erick Mejia; 27 Adalberto Mondesí; 66 Ryan O'Hearn; 46 Matt Reynolds	Outfielders: 19 Franchy Cordero; 4 Alex Gordon; 0 Nick Heath; 15 Whit Merrifield; 14 Edward Olivares; 14 Brett Phillips; 12 Jorge Soler; 11 Bubba Starling	Manager: 22 Mike Matheny; Coaches: 8 Rafael Belliard (infield); 44 Terry Bradshaw (hitting); 34 Larry Carter (bullpen); 80 Ryan Eigsti (bullpen catcher); 23 Cal Eldred (pitching); 6 Pedro Grifol (bench); 39 Damon Hollins (first base); 47 John Mabry (coach); 25 Vance Wilson (third base)

== Player stats ==
=== Batting ===
Note: G = Games played; AB = At bats; R = Runs; H = Hits; 2B = Doubles; 3B = Triples; HR = Home runs; RBI = Runs batted in; SB = Stolen bases; BB = Walks; AVG = Batting average; SLG = Slugging average

Player	G	AB	R	H	2B	3B	HR	RBI	SB	BB	AVG	SLG
Whit Merrifield	60	248	38	70	12	0	9	30	12	12	.282	.440
Maikel Franco	60	223	23	62	16	0	8	38	1	16	.278	.457
Adalberto Mondesí	59	219	33	56	11	3	6	22	24	11	.256	.416
Nicky Lopez	56	169	15	34	8	0	1	13	0	18	.201	.266
Alex Gordon	50	163	15	34	4	0	4	11	0	18	.209	.307
Hunter Dozier	44	158	29	36	4	2	6	12	4	27	.228	.392
Salvador Pérez	37	150	22	50	12	0	11	32	1	3	.333	.633
Jorge Soler	43	149	17	34	8	0	8	24	0	19	.228	.443
Ryan O'Hearn	42	113	7	22	6	0	2	18	0	18	.195	.301
Ryan McBroom	36	81	8	20	3	0	6	10	0	4	.247	.506
Edward Olivares	18	62	5	17	1	1	2	7	0	2	.274	.419
Bubba Starling	35	59	5	10	1	0	1	5	0	4	.169	.237
Cam Gallagher	25	53	10	15	5	0	1	3	0	6	.283	.434
Franchy Cordero	16	38	7	8	3	0	2	7	1	4	.211	.447
Brett Phillips	18	31	8	7	0	1	1	2	3	3	.226	.387
Meibrys Viloria	15	21	1	4	1	0	0	0	0	2	.190	.238
Erick Mejia	8	14	1	1	1	0	0	0	1	0	.071	.143
Nick Heath	15	13	2	2	1	0	0	3	2	2	.154	.231
Matt Reynolds	3	11	1	0	0	0	0	0	0	0	.000	.000
Kelvin Gutiérrez	4	9	0	1	0	0	0	0	0	3	.111	.111
Oscar Hernández	4	4	1	2	0	0	0	0	0	0	.500	.500
Team totals	60	1988	248	485	97	7	68	237	49	172	.244	.402

=== Pitching ===
Note: W = Wins; L = Losses; ERA = Earned run average; G = Games pitched; GS = Games started; SV = Saves; IP = Innings pitched; H = Hits allowed; R = Runs allowed; ER = Earned runs allowed; BB = Walks allowed; SO = Strikeouts

Player	W	L	ERA	G	GS	SV	IP	H	R	ER	BB	SO
Brady Singer	4	5	4.06	12	12	0	64.1	52	29	29	23	61
Danny Duffy	4	4	4.95	12	11	0	56.1	53	33	31	22	57
Brad Keller	5	3	2.47	9	9	0	54.2	39	16	15	17	35
Kris Bubic	1	6	4.32	10	10	0	50.0	52	29	24	22	49
Scott Barlow	2	1	4.20	32	0	2	30.0	27	14	14	9	39
Greg Holland	3	0	1.91	28	0	6	28.1	20	8	6	7	31
Josh Staumont	2	1	2.45	26	0	0	25.2	20	8	7	16	37
Jakob Junis	0	2	6.39	8	6	0	25.1	35	18	18	6	19
Kyle Zimmer	1	0	1.57	16	1	0	23.0	14	4	4	10	26
Tyler Zuber	1	2	4.09	23	0	0	22.0	15	11	10	20	30
Jake Newberry	1	0	4.09	20	0	1	22.0	20	12	10	12	24
Jesse Hahn	1	0	0.52	18	0	3	17.1	4	1	1	8	19
Carlos Hernández	0	1	4.91	5	3	0	14.2	19	9	8	6	13
Ian Kennedy	0	2	9.00	15	1	0	14.0	20	17	14	5	15
Trevor Rosenthal	0	0	3.29	14	0	7	13.2	9	5	5	7	21
Matt Harvey	0	3	11.57	7	4	0	11.2	27	15	15	5	10
Chance Adams	0	0	9.35	6	0	0	8.2	15	9	9	0	6
Kevin McCarthy	0	0	4.50	5	0	0	6.0	10	3	3	2	2
Gabe Speier	0	1	7.94	8	0	0	5.2	9	5	5	4	6
Mike Montgomery	0	0	5.06	3	1	0	5.1	6	5	3	1	4
Glen Sparkman	0	0	5.40	4	0	0	5.0	9	6	3	1	2
Ronald Bolaños	0	2	12.27	2	2	0	3.2	8	7	5	3	2
Randy Rosario	0	1	8.10	4	0	0	3.1	7	3	3	3	4
Scott Blewett	0	0	6.00	2	0	0	3.0	6	2	2	1	4
Foster Griffin	1	0	0.00	1	0	0	1.2	0	0	0	0	1
Richard Lovelady	0	0	9.00	1	0	0	1.0	1	1	1	1	0
Jorge López	0	0	27.00	1	0	0	0.2	3	2	2	0	0
Team totals	26	34	4.30	60	60	19	517.0	500	272	247	211	517

== Farm system ==
On June 30, 2020, Minor League Baseball announced that the 2020 season would not be played due to the COVID-19 pandemic.

Level	Team	League	Manager
AAA	Omaha Storm Chasers	Pacific Coast League	
AA	Northwest Arkansas Naturals	Texas League	
A-Advanced	Wilmington Blue Rocks	Carolina League	
A	Lexington Legends	South Atlantic League	
Rookie	Burlington Royals	Appalachian League	
Rookie	Idaho Falls Chukars	Pioneer League	
Rookie	AZL Royals	Arizona League	
Rookie	DSL Royals	Dominican Summer League	
