= Cam Gallagher =

American baseball player (born 1992)

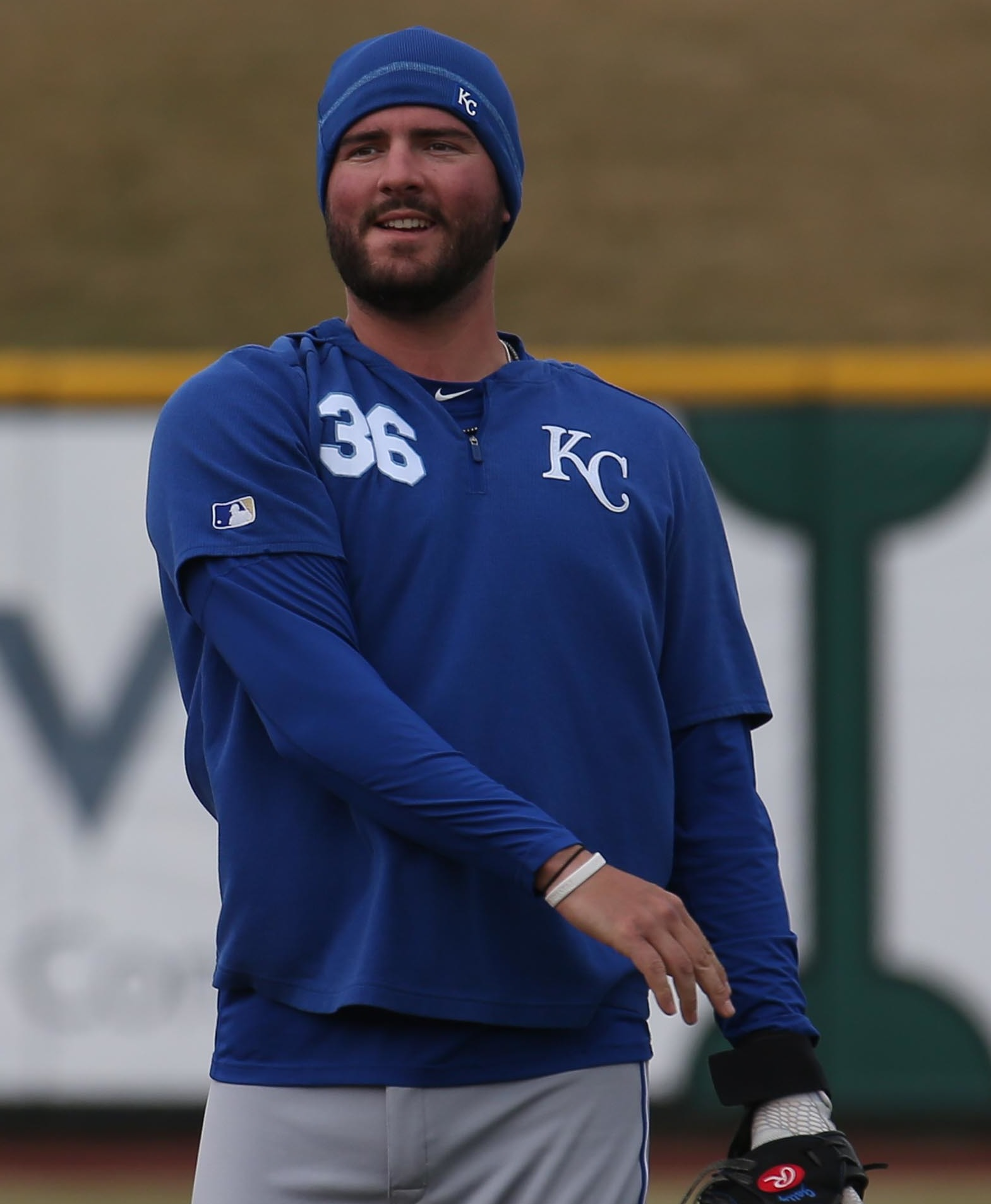
- Gallagher with the Kansas City Royals in 2019
- Catcher
- Born: December 6, 1992 (age 33); Lancaster, Pennsylvania, U.S.
- Batted: Right Threw: Right

MLB debut
- August 6, 2017, for the Kansas City Royals

Last MLB appearance
- September 30, 2023, for the Cleveland Guardians

MLB statistics
- Batting average: .211
- Home runs: 7
- Runs batted in: 46
- Stats at Baseball Reference

Teams
- Kansas City Royals (2017–2022); Cleveland Guardians (2023)
Medals
Men's baseball
Representing United States
Pan American Games
Silver medal – second place	2015 Toronto	Team

Cameron Joseph Gallagher (born December 6, 1992) is an American former professional baseball catcher. He played in Major League Baseball (MLB) for the Kansas City Royals and Cleveland Guardians from 2017 to 2023.

== Professional career ==
=== Kansas City Royals ===
Gallagher was drafted by the Kansas City Royals in the second round of the 2011 MLB draft out of Manheim Township High School in Lancaster, Pennsylvania. The Royals added him to their 40-man roster after the 2016 season.

The Royals promoted Gallagher to the 25-man roster to replace the injured Salvador Pérez on August 6, 2017. He made his MLB debut the same day in the second game of a doubleheader against the Seattle Mariners, collecting his first MLB hit. He hit his first MLB home run on August 14, 2017 against the Oakland Athletics, a grand slam.

In 2018, Gallagher batted .206/.250/.302 for the Royals with 1 home run and 7 RBI in 63 at bats. Gallagher played in 45 contests in 2019, slashing .238/.312/.365 with career-highs in home runs (3) and RBI (12).

On July 11, 2020, it was announced that Gallagher had tested positive for COVID-19. Overall with the 2020 Kansas City Royals, Gallagher batted .283 with one home run and 3 RBIs in 25 games. In 2021, he batted .250/.298/.330 with one home run and 7 RBIs in 112 at bats.

=== San Diego Padres ===
On August 2, 2022, Gallagher was traded to the San Diego Padres in exchange for Brent Rooker. In 16 games for the Triple–A El Paso Chihuahuas, he batted .255/.318/.382 with one home run and 10 RBI. On September 9, Gallagher was designated for assignment by San Diego.

=== Baltimore Orioles ===
On September 11, 2022, Gallagher was claimed off waivers by the Baltimore Orioles. He appeared in 5 games for the Triple-A Norfolk Tides, going 1-for-17 (.059) with 3 RBI and 3 walks. On November 8, Gallagher was removed from the 40-man roster and sent outright to Triple-A, however he rejected the assignment and elected free agency.

=== Cleveland Guardians ===
On January 4, 2023, Gallagher signed a minor league contract with the Cleveland Guardians. The deal included an invitation to the Guardians' 2023 major league spring training camp.

The Guardians selected Gallagher's contract on March 30, 2023 after it was announced that he had made the Opening Day roster. In 56 games for Cleveland, he batted .126/.154/.168 with no home runs and 7 RBI. Following the season on November 6, Gallagher was designated for assignment following the waiver claim of Christian Bethancourt. He elected free agency on November 10.

=== Philadelphia Phillies ===
On February 25, 2024, Gallagher signed a minor league contract with the Philadelphia Phillies. He did not appear in a game for the organization after being placed on the restricted list to begin the season. Gallagher was released by the Phillies organization on June 1.
