= Nicky Lopez =

American baseball player (born 1995)

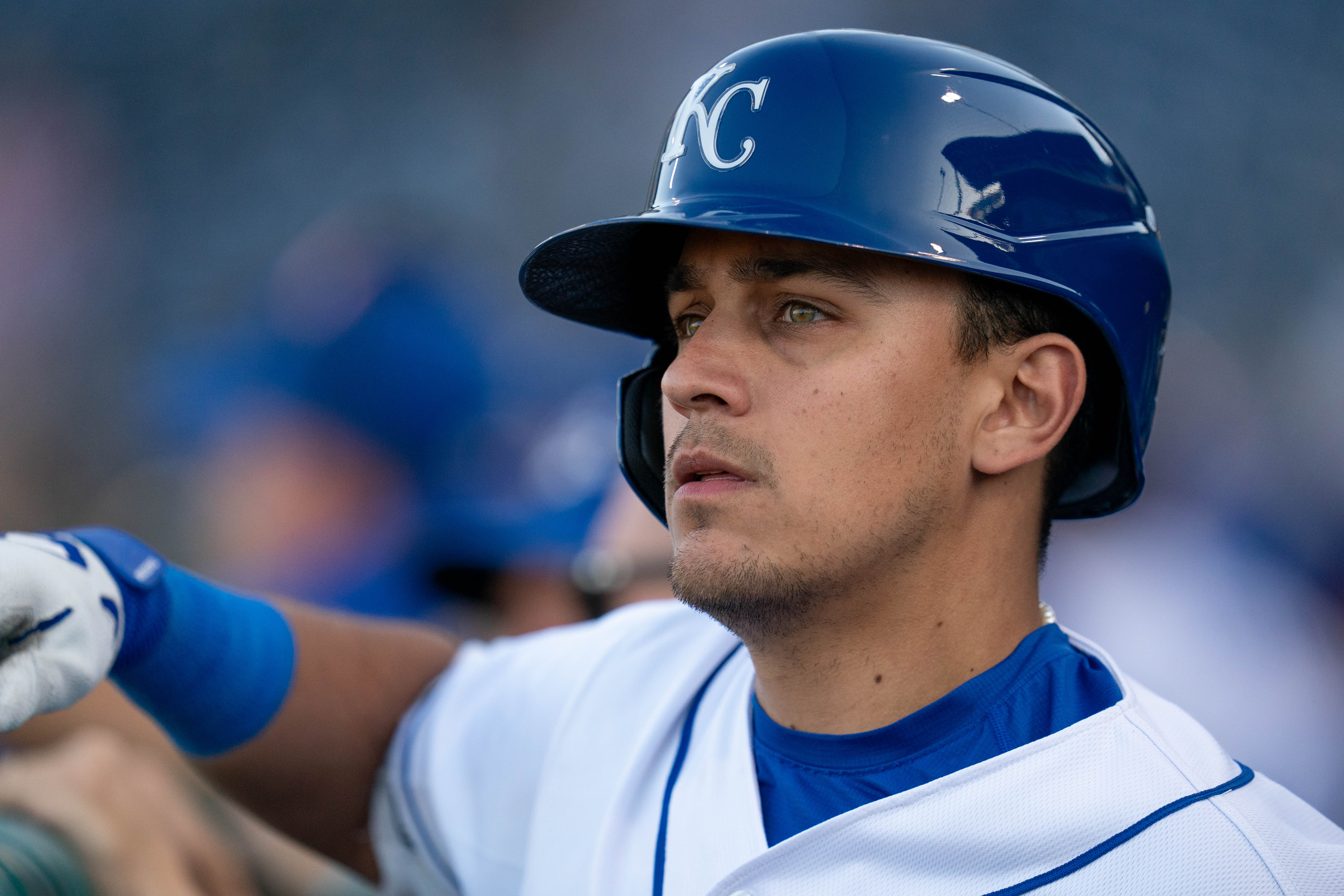
- Lopez with the Kansas City Royals in 2023

Free agent
- Shortstop / Second baseman
- Born: March 13, 1995 (age 31); Naperville, Illinois, U.S.
- Bats: Left Throws: Right

MLB debut
- May 14, 2019, for the Kansas City Royals

MLB statistics (through 2026 season)
- Batting average: .248
- Home runs: 8
- Runs batted in: 177
- Stats at Baseball Reference

Teams
- Kansas City Royals (2019–2023); Atlanta Braves (2023); Chicago White Sox (2024); Los Angeles Angels (2025); Chicago Cubs (2025–2026); Texas Rangers (2026)

Nicholas Lopez (born March 13, 1995) is an American professional baseball shortstop and second baseman who is a free agent. He has played in Major League Baseball (MLB) for the Kansas City Royals, Atlanta Braves, Chicago White Sox, Los Angeles Angels, Chicago Cubs, and Texas Rangers. He was drafted by the Royals in the fifth round of the 2016 MLB draft, and made his MLB debut with them in 2019.

== Amateur career ==
Lopez attended Naperville Central High School in Naperville, Illinois. In 2013, as a senior, he batted .398. Naperville Central High School inducted Lopez into the school’s Athletic Hall of Fame on Friday, January 26, 2024. After high school, he enrolled and played college baseball at Creighton University. In 2016, his junior season, he hit .306 with two home runs and 22 RBIs in 55 games. After the season, he was drafted by the Kansas City Royals in the fifth round of the 2016 Major League Baseball draft.

== Professional career ==
=== Kansas City Royals ===
Lopez made his professional debut with the Burlington Royals and spent the whole 2016 season there, posting a .281 batting average with six home runs, 29 RBIs and 24 stolen bases in 62 games. In 2017, he spent time with both the Wilmington Blue Rocks and the Northwest Arkansas Naturals, batting a combined .279 with two home runs, 38 RBIs, 24 stolen bases and a .704 OPS in 129 games. After the season, the Royals assigned Lopez to the Surprise Saguaros of the Arizona Fall League. He began 2018 with Northwest Arkansas and was promoted to the Omaha Storm Chasers in June. In 130 total games between the two clubs, Lopez batted .308/.382/.417 with nine home runs and 53 RBIs.

Lopez began 2019 back with Omaha. On May 14, his contract was selected and he was called up to the major leagues for the first time. He made his debut that night versus the Texas Rangers.

Overall with the 2020 Kansas City Royals, Lopez batted .201 with one home run and 13 RBIs in 56 games. He had the lowest slugging percentage of all qualified hitters in the AL, at .266. Lopez was nominated for the Gold Glove at second base, having erroneously been omitted from the initial list of finalists. He eventually lost out on the award to César Hernández of Cleveland.

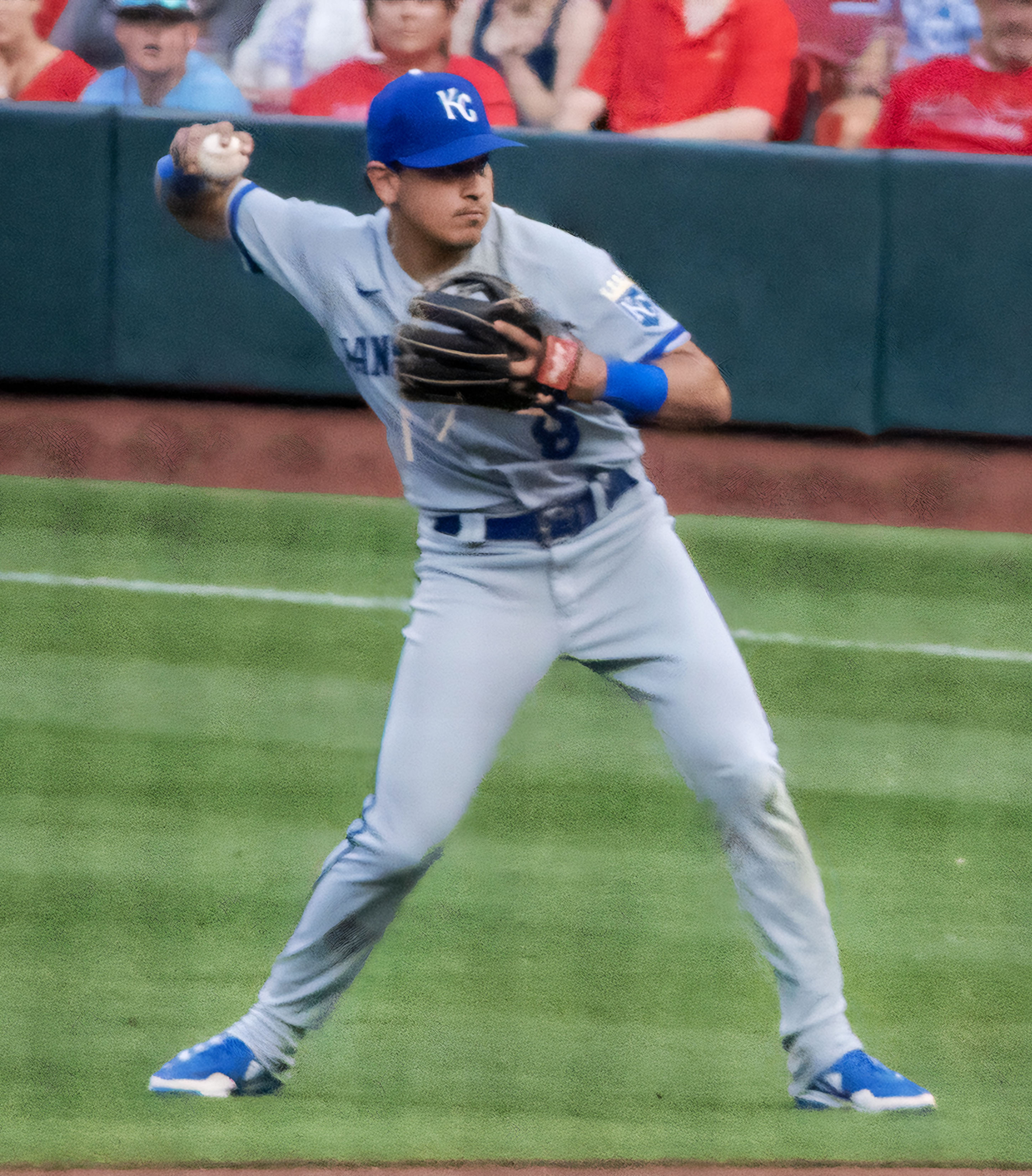
Lopez in 2023

During spring training in 2021, Lopez switched his uniform number from No. 1 to No 8 to allow Jarrod Dyson to wear No 1. Having hit .118 in 34 at-bats in Spring Training, Lopez was optioned to Triple-A Omaha, with Whit Merrifield expected to assume the starting second baseman role. However, an injury to shortstop Adalberto Mondesí in the final game of Spring Training forced him onto the injured list, and Lopez began the regular season as the Royals shortstop. Mondesí was activated and made his season debut on May 25, but returned to the injured list with a separate injury on June 6. Lopez was listed on the Royals All-Star ballot at the designated hitter position, despite not having played a game there during the season, as the team put Mondesí on the ballot at shortstop and Merrifield at second base. On August 19, Lopez hit his first home run of the season in a 3–6 loss against the Houston Astros. Lopez ended 2021 with 78 runs, 43 RBIs, 22 stolen bases and a .300 batting average, becoming the first regular Royals shortstop to bat .300 or better in a season. Defensively, he led all qualifying AL shortstops with a .987 fielding percentage.

=== Atlanta Braves ===
On July 30, 2023, the Royals traded Lopez to the Atlanta Braves in exchange for Taylor Hearn. In his first start for the Braves on August 12, Lopez recorded four hits, including a 3-run home run, at the plate and finished the game on the mound, pitching a scoreless ninth inning in a 21–3 victory against the New York Mets.

=== Chicago White Sox ===
On November 16, 2023, the Braves traded Lopez to the Chicago White Sox, along with Michael Soroka, Jared Shuster, Braden Shewmake, and Riley Gowens for Aaron Bummer. He played in 124 games for the White Sox in 2024, slashing .241/.312/.294 with one home run, 21 RBI, and five stolen bases. On November 12, 2024, Lopez was removed from the 40–man roster and sent outright to the Triple–A Charlotte Knights, but he rejected the assignment and elected free agency.

=== Los Angeles Angels ===
On February 2, 2025, Lopez signed a minor league contract with the Chicago Cubs. He was released prior to the start of the season on March 21.

On March 25, 2025, Lopez signed a major league contract with the Los Angeles Angels. Lopez made his Angels debut on Opening Day in an unusual manner, as a relief pitcher, during a blowout game versus the Chicago White Sox. In four games for the Angels, he went 0-for-6. Lopez was designated for assignment by Los Angeles on April 18. He cleared waivers and elected free agency the next day.

=== Chicago Cubs ===
On April 23, 2025, Lopez signed with the Chicago Cubs on a major league contract. In 14 appearances for Chicago, he went 1-for-18 (.056) with one RBI and four walks. Lopez was designated for assignment by Chicago on May 19. He cleared waivers and elected free agency on May 21.

=== Arizona Diamondbacks ===
On May 27, 2025, Lopez signed a minor league contract with the Arizona Diamondbacks. In 24 appearances for the Triple-A Reno Aces, he batted .267/.303/.317 with seven RBI and one stolen base. On July 1, Lopez triggered an opt-out clause in his contract and was released by Arizona.

=== New York Yankees ===
On July 3, 2025, Lopez signed a minor league contract with the New York Yankees. In 17 appearances for the Triple-A Scranton/Wilkes-Barre RailRiders, he batted .263/.338/.333 with six RBI and four stolen bases. On August 2, Lopez opted out of his contract and elected free agency.

=== Chicago Cubs (second stint) ===
On August 9, 2025, Lopez signed a minor league contract with the Chicago Cubs organization. He made 29 appearances for the Triple-A Iowa Cubs, batting .270/.402/.350 with seven RBI and two stolen bases. Lopez elected free agency following the season on November 6.

=== Colorado Rockies ===
On December 1, 2025, Lopez signed a minor league contract with the Colorado Rockies that included an invitation to spring training. Lopez played in 15 games for the Triple-A Albuquerque Isotopes, batting .333/.387/.519 with one home run, eight RBI, and two stolen bases.

=== Chicago Cubs (third stint) ===
On April 23, 2026, Lopez was traded back to the Chicago Cubs organization. The following day, the Cubs selected Lopez's contract, adding him to their active roster. He made four appearances for Chicago, going 0-for-5. Lopez was designated for assignment by the Cubs on May 23; he cleared waivers and was sent outright to the Triple-A Iowa Cubs on May 25. However, Lopez rejected the assignment and subsequently elected free agency.

=== Texas Rangers ===
On May 27, 2026, Lopez signed a major league contract with the Texas Rangers.

== International career ==
Lopez played for the Italy national baseball team at the 2023 World Baseball Classic.
