= Ronald Bolaños =

Cuban baseball player (born 1996)

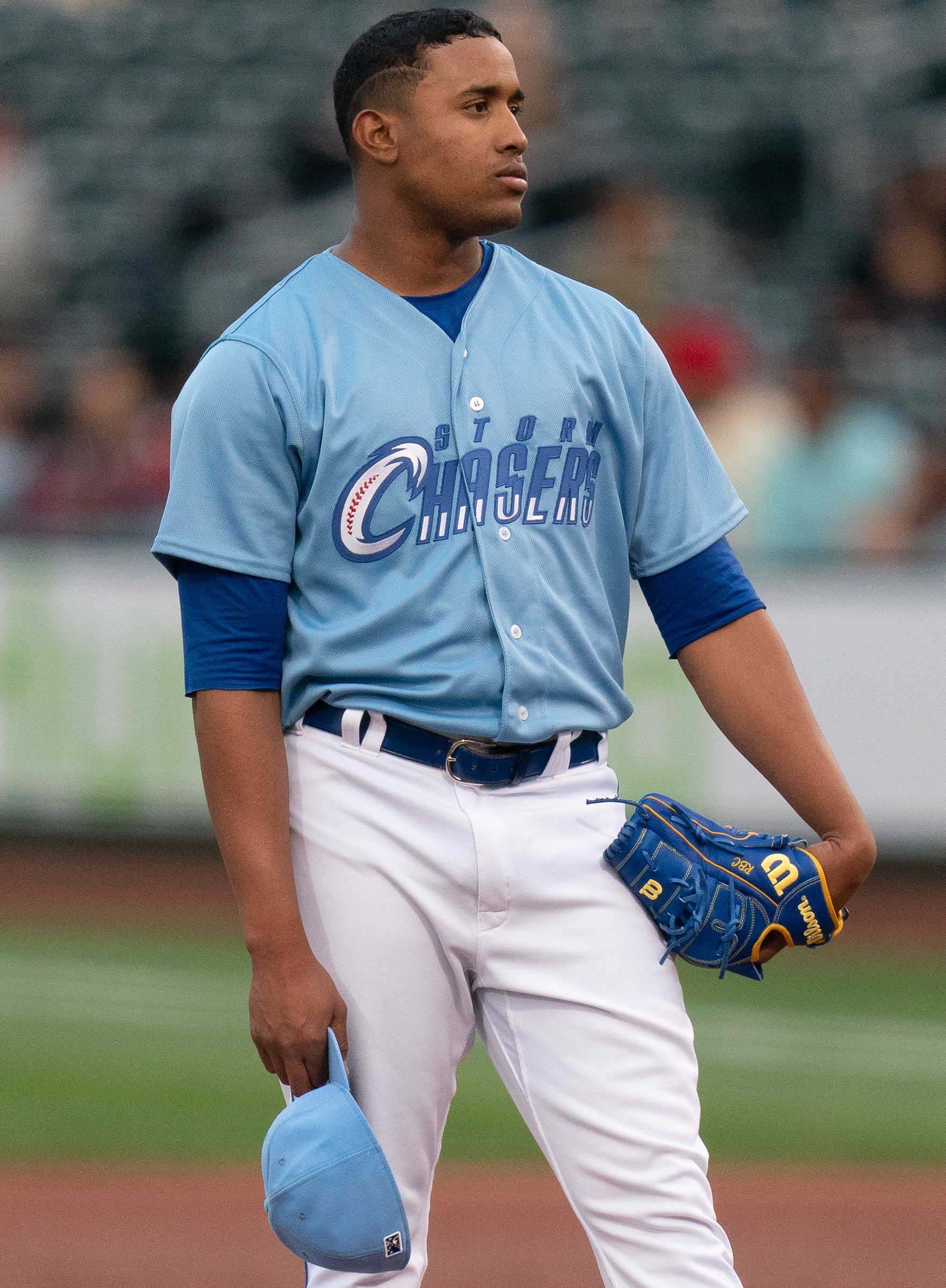
- Bolaños with the Omaha Storm Chasers in 2021

Free agent
- Pitcher
- Born: August 23, 1996 (age 30); Jaruco, Mayabeque Province, Cuba
- Bats: Right Throws: Right

MLB debut
- September 3, 2019, for the San Diego Padres

MLB statistics (through 2022 season)
- Win–loss record: 0–4
- Earned run average: 5.25
- Strikeouts: 43
- Stats at Baseball Reference

Teams
- San Diego Padres (2019); Kansas City Royals (2020–2022)

Ronald Bolaños (born August 23, 1996) is a Cuban professional baseball pitcher who is a free agent. He has previously played in Major League Baseball (MLB) for the San Diego Padres and Kansas City Royals.

== Career ==
=== San Diego Padres ===
Before coming to the United States, Bolaños played for Mayabeque of the Cuban National Series. He signed with the San Diego Padres as an international free agent on August 11, 2016.

Bolaños played for the Fort Wayne TinCaps in 2017, going 5–2 with a 4.42 ERA in 69 innings. He spent the 2018 season with the Lake Elsinore Storm, going 6–9 with a 5.11 ERA in 125 innings. Bolaños split the 2019 minor league season between Lake Elsinore and the Amarillo Sod Poodles, combining to go 13–7 with a 3.66 ERA over 129 innings.

The Padres selected Bolaños' contract and promoted him to the major leagues for the first time on September 2, 2019. He made his major league debut on September 3 versus the Arizona Diamondbacks, allowing two runs over six innings pitched. Bolaños made three starts and two relief appearances for the Padres in 2019 and ended the season with a 5.95 ERA and 19 strikeouts in 19 2/3 innings.

=== Kansas City Royals ===
On July 16, 2020, Bolaños and Franchy Cordero were traded to the Kansas City Royals in exchange for Tim Hill. With the 2020 Kansas City Royals, Bolaños appeared in two games, compiling an 0–2 record with 12.27 ERA and two strikeouts in 3 2/3 innings pitched.

On June 18, 2021, Bolaños was placed on the 60-day injured list with a right forearm strain. Bolaños was activated from the injured list on September 12. In only 3 appearances for Kansas City in 2021, he recorded a 1.42 ERA with 10 strikeouts.

Bolaños made 8 appearances for Kansas City in 2022, working to a 4.42 ERA with 12 strikeouts in 18 1/3 innings pitched. On June 27, 2022, he was designated for assignment following the promotion of Vinnie Pasquantino. He cleared waivers and was sent outright to the Triple-A Omaha Storm Chasers on July 4. In 28 appearances for Omaha to close out the year, he struggled to a 6.26 ERA with 34 strikeouts in 41 2/3 innings pitched.

Bolaños was released by the Royals organization on March 24, 2023.

=== Miami Marlins ===
On April 16, 2023, Bolaños signed a minor league deal with the Miami Marlins. In 16 games (15 starts) for the Triple–A Jacksonville Jumbo Shrimp, he struggled to a 3–10 record and 8.63 ERA with 48 strikeouts in 65 2/3 innings pitched. On August 3, Bolaños was released by the Marlins organization.

=== Diablos Rojos del México ===
On February 8, 2024, Bolaños signed with the Diablos Rojos del México of the Mexican League. He made two appearances for México, logging a 4.15 ERA with two strikeouts across 4 1/3 innings of work.

=== Guerreros de Oaxaca ===
On April 21, 2024, Bolaños was traded to the Guerreros de Oaxaca of the Mexican League. He made two starts for Oaxaca, but struggled immensely to a 15.19 ERA with 6 strikeouts across 5 1/3 innings.

=== Algodoneros de Unión Laguna ===
On May 9, 2024, Bolaños was traded to the Algodoneros de Unión Laguna of the Mexican League. He made five starts for Laguna, posting a 1–2 record with a 7.71 ERA and seven strikeouts across 16 1/3 innings. Bolaños was released by the Algodoneros on June 14.

=== Conspiradores de Querétaro ===
On March 5, 2025, Bolaños signed with the Guerreros de Oaxaca of the Mexican League. He was released prior to the start of the season on March 28.

On April 22, 2025, Bolaños signed with the Conspiradores de Querétaro of the Mexican League. In 10 appearances (nine starts) for Querétaro, he struggled to a 1-4 record and 10.50 ERA with 22 strikeouts over 36 innings of work. Bolaños was released by the Conspiradores on June 19.

=== Charleston Dirty Birds ===
On May 7, 2026, Bolaños signed with the Charleston Dirty Birds of the Atlantic League of Professional Baseball. He was released on May 19. In 2 games (1 start) he threw 5 innings struggling mightily going 0-1 with a 12.60 ERA with more walks (3) than strikeouts (1).
