= Nick Heath (baseball) =

American baseball player (born 1993)

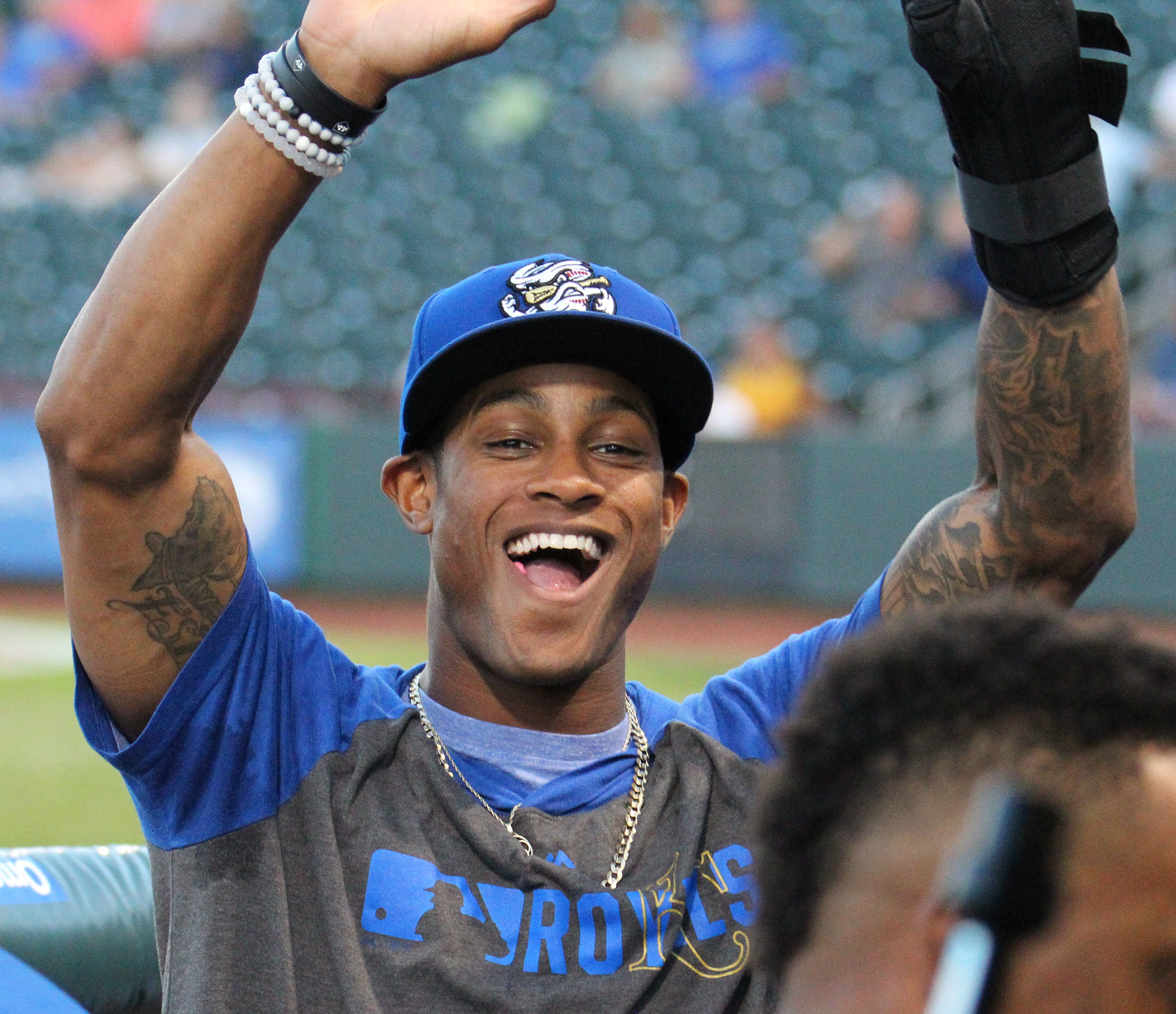
- Heath with the Omaha Storm Chasers in 2019
- Outfielder
- Born: November 27, 1993 (age 32); Decatur, Georgia, U.S.
- Batted: Left Threw: Left

MLB debut
- July 30, 2020, for the Kansas City Royals

Last MLB appearance
- July 3, 2021, for the Arizona Diamondbacks

MLB statistics
- Batting average: .146
- Home runs: 0
- Runs batted in: 4
- Stats at Baseball Reference

Teams
- Kansas City Royals (2020); Arizona Diamondbacks (2021)

Nicholas James Heath (born November 27, 1993) is an American former professional baseball outfielder. He played in Major League Baseball (MLB) for the Kansas City Royals and Arizona Diamondbacks.

== Career ==
Heath attended Junction City High School in Junction City, Kansas. Undrafted out of high school, Heath attended Northwestern State University. He redshirted his freshman year and played the following three seasons of college baseball for the Demons (2014-2016). Heath was drafted by the Kansas City Royals in the 16th round, with the 493rd overall selection, of the 2016 MLB draft.

=== Kansas City Royals ===
Heath played for the Idaho Falls Chukars in 2016, hitting .291/.350/.387/.737 with 2 home runs, 28 RBI, and 36 stolen bases. He split the 2017 season between the Arizona Royals, Lexington Legends, and Wilmington Blue Rocks, hitting a combined .253/.316/.298/.614 with 1 home run, 16 RBI, and 25 stolen bases. Heath split the 2018 season between Wilmington and the Northwest Arkansas Naturals, hitting a combined .274/.376/.358/.734 with 2 home runs, 27 RBI, and 39 stolen bases. He played for the Surprise Saguaros of the Arizona Fall League following the 2018 season. He split the 2019 season between Northwest Arkansas and the Omaha Storm Chasers, hitting a combined .255/.345/.387/.732 with 8 home runs, 36 RBI, and 60 stolen bases.

Heath was added to the Royals 40–man roster following the 2019 season. He made his MLB debut on July 30, 2020, against the Detroit Tigers. Overall with the 2020 Kansas City Royals, Heath batted .154 with no home runs and 3 RBIs in 15 games.

On April 14, 2021, Heath was designated for assignment by the Royals.

=== Arizona Diamondbacks ===
On April 17, 2021, Heath was traded to the Arizona Diamondbacks in exchange for right-hander Eduardo Herrera. Heath hit .143/.231/.171 with no home runs and 1 RBI in 20 games for Arizona before he was designated for assignment on July 10. On July 14, Heath was assigned outright to the Triple-A Reno Aces. He was released on April 30, 2022.

=== Charleston Dirty Birds ===
On June 19, 2022, Heath signed with the Charleston Dirty Birds of the Atlantic League of Professional Baseball. Heath appeared in 77 games for Charleston, slashing .238/.358/.349 with 4 home runs, 33 RBI, and 42 stolen bases. He became a free agent following the season.

=== Chicago Dogs ===
On March 16, 2023, Heath signed with the Chicago Dogs of the American Association of Professional Baseball. In 68 games for Chicago, he batted .241/.373/.361 with four home runs, 34 RBI, and 30 stolen bases. Heath would become a free agent after the 2023 season.

=== Long Island Ducks ===
On March 28, 2024, Heath signed with the Long Island Ducks of the Atlantic League of Professional Baseball. In 58 games for the Ducks, he batted .264/.390/.445 with eight home runs, 36 RBI, and 27 stolen bases. Heath became a free agent following the season.

== Personal life ==
Heath's mother, Kimberly Milleson, ran track at Kansas State University and was a U.S. Olympic trials participant.

In June 2020, Northwestern State created the Nick Heath Minority Scholarship which it announced would be awarded to three minority baseball players between ages 5 and 13 to cover the cost of enrollment at a school-sponsored youth baseball camp. Heath also announced that he would be donating a bat and custom glove to each recipient of the scholarship.
