= Chance Adams =

American baseball player (born 1994)

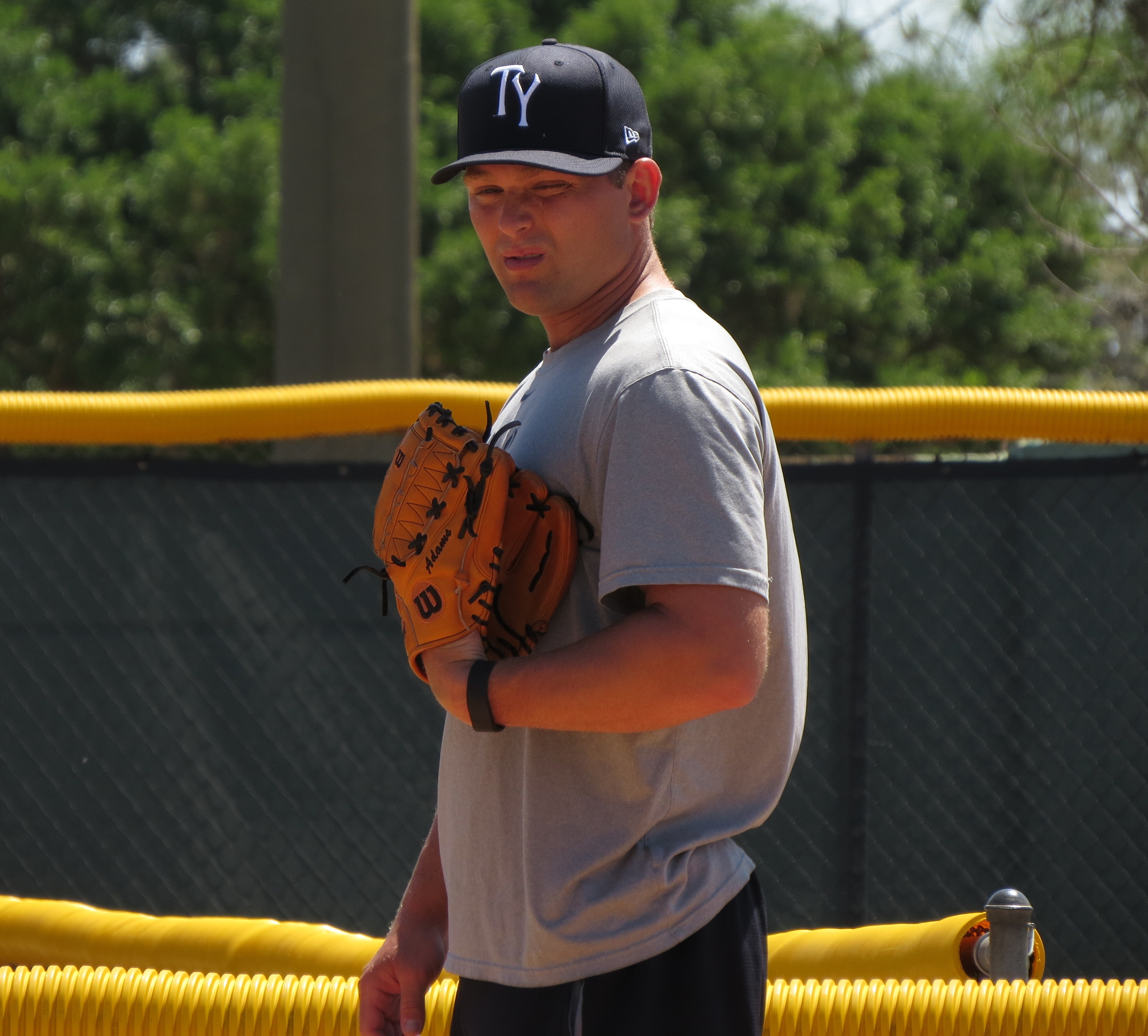
- Adams with the Tampa Yankees in 2016
- Pitcher
- Born: August 10, 1994 (age 32); Scottsdale, Arizona, U.S.
- Batted: Right Threw: Right

MLB debut
- August 4, 2018, for the New York Yankees

Last MLB appearance
- September 22, 2020, for the Kansas City Royals

MLB statistics
- Win–loss record: 1–2
- Earned run average: 8.42
- Strikeouts: 33
- Stats at Baseball Reference

Teams
- New York Yankees (2018–2019); Kansas City Royals (2020)

Chance Adams (born August 10, 1994) is an American former professional baseball pitcher. He played in Major League Baseball (MLB) for the New York Yankees and Kansas City Royals.

== Career ==
Adams attended Chaparral High School in Scottsdale, Arizona. He played college baseball at Yavapai College for two years before transferring to Dallas Baptist University. After one year at Dallas Baptist, Adams was drafted by the New York Yankees in the fifth round of the 2015 Major League Baseball draft.

=== New York Yankees ===
Adams made his professional debut with the Staten Island Yankees of the Low-A New York-Penn League and was later promoted to the Charleston RiverDogs of the Single-A South Atlantic League and Tampa Yankees of the High-A Florida State League. He posted a combined 3–1 win–loss record, 1.78 earned run average (ERA) and 0.93 walks plus hits per inning pitched in 35 1/3 combined innings between the three teams. Adams was converted into a starting pitcher in 2016 and started the year with Tampa, and after pitching to a 5–0 record and 2.65 ERA in 12 games, was promoted to the Trenton Thunder of the Double-A Eastern League in June, where he finished the season with an 8–1 record and 2.07 ERA. In 2017, Adams pitched for Trenton and the Scranton/Wilkes-Barre RailRiders of the Triple-A International League, posting a combined 15–5 record and 2.45 ERA in 150 1/3 total innings pitched between both teams.

Adams began the 2018 season with Scranton/Wilkes-Barre. Ok August 4, 2018, Adams was promoted to the major leagues for the first time to start against the Boston Red Sox. He would make three total appearances in his rookie campaign. In 2019, Adams pitched in 13 games out of the Yankees' bullpen, but struggled to an 8.53 ERA with 23 strikeouts and 1 save in 25 1/3 innings of work. Adams was designated for assignment by New York on December 18, 2019, after the signing of Gerrit Cole was made official.

=== Kansas City Royals ===
On December 23, 2019, the Yankees traded Adams to the Kansas City Royals for minor league prospect infielder Cristian Perez. He was not immediately assigned to an affiliate due to the cancellation of the minor league season because of the COVID-19 pandemic. He made his Royals debut on August 24, 2020, against the St. Louis Cardinals, allowing 3 runs on 4 hits across 1.2 innings of work. Adams appeared in 6 games with the Royals, compiling a 0–0 record with a 9.35 ERA and 6 strikeouts in 8.2 innings pitched. Adams underwent Tommy John surgery in October 2020. On November 20, 2020, Adams was removed from the 40-man roster.

In 2021, Adams made 6 rehab appearances split between the rookie-level Arizona Complex League Royals and Triple-A Omaha Storm Chasers, struggling to an 8.53 ERA with 9 strikeouts in 6.1 innings pitched. He elected free agency following the season on November 7, 2021.

=== Colorado Rockies ===
On May 23, 2023, Adams signed a minor league contract with the Colorado Rockies organization. In 31 appearances for the Triple–A Albuquerque Isotopes, he registered a 3.86 ERA with 21 strikeouts across 32 2/3 innings of work. Adams elected free agency following the season on November 6.

On December 18, 2023, Adams re-signed with Colorado on a new minor league contract. On November 6, he elected free agency.
