= Franchy Cordero =

Dominican baseball player (born 1994)

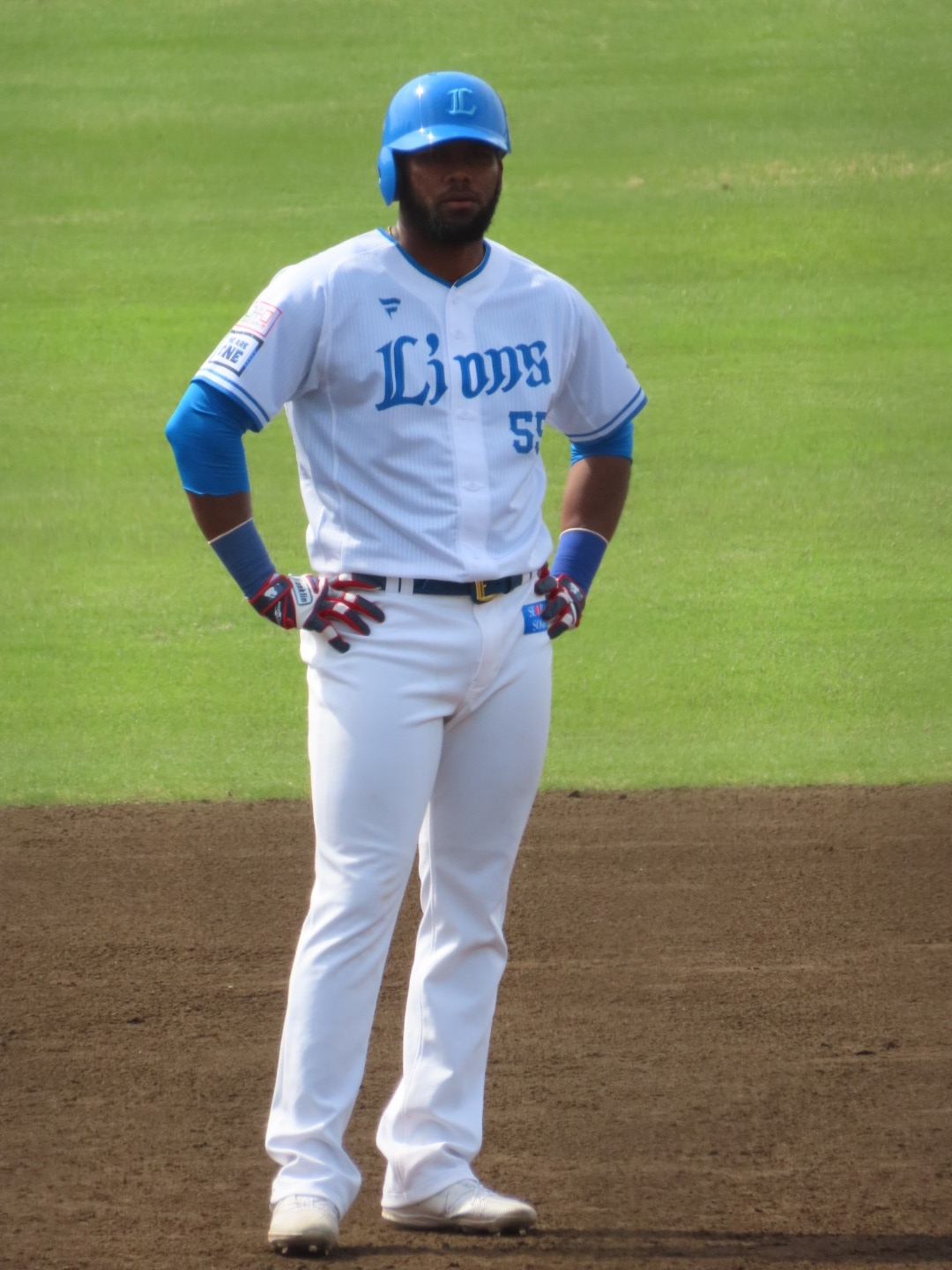
- Cordero with the Saitama Seibu Lions in 2024

Leones del Escogido – No. 38
- Outfielder / First baseman
- Born: September 2, 1994 (age 32); Azua, Dominican Republic
- Bats: Left Throws: Right

Professional debut
- MLB: May 27, 2017, for the San Diego Padres
- NPB: March 29, 2024, for the Saitama Seibu Lions

MLB statistics (through 2023 season)
- Batting average: .217
- Home runs: 27
- Runs batted in: 87

NPB statistics (through 2024 season)
- Batting average: .129
- Home runs: 1
- Runs batted in: 4
- Stats at Baseball Reference

Teams
- San Diego Padres (2017–2019); Kansas City Royals (2020); Boston Red Sox (2021–2022); New York Yankees (2023); Saitama Seibu Lions (2024)

Franchy Cordero Vargas (born September 2, 1994) is a Dominican professional baseball outfielder and first baseman for the Toros de Tijuana of the Mexican League. He has previously played in Major League Baseball (MLB) for the San Diego Padres, Kansas City Royals, Boston Red Sox and New York Yankees, and in Nippon Professional Baseball (NPB) for the Saitama Seibu Lions.

== Career ==
=== San Diego Padres ===
Cordero signed with the San Diego Padres as an international free agent in November 2011. He made his professional debut in 2012 with the Dominican Summer League Padres, batting .270 with one home run and 38 runs batted in (RBIs) in 61 games played. In 2013, he played for the Arizona League Padres where he slashed .333/.381/.511 with three home runs and 17 RBIs in 35 games. Cordero started 2014 with the Fort Wayne TinCaps and was demoted to the Eugene Emeralds during the season. In 83 games between the two teams, he batted .255 with nine home runs and 44 RBIs.

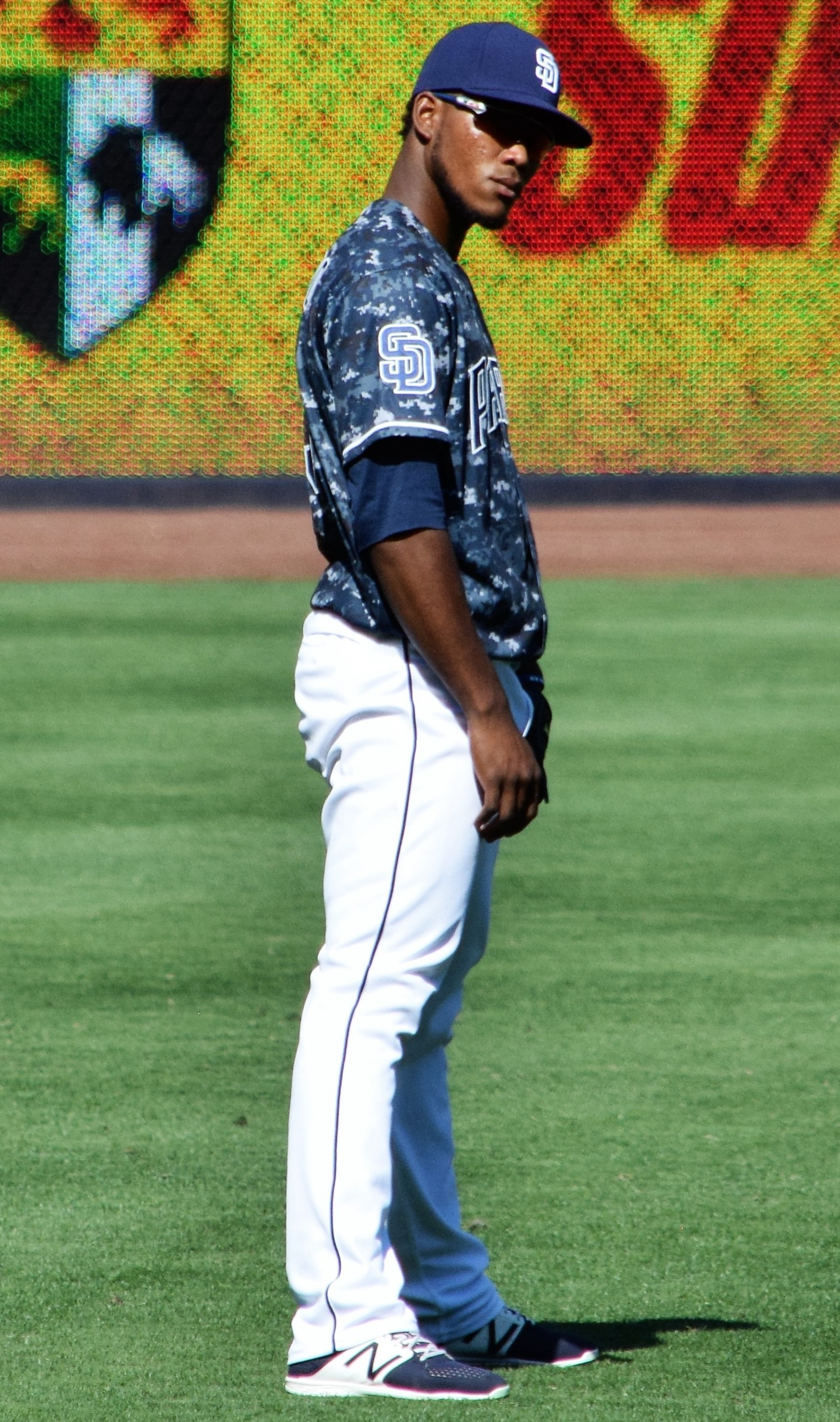
Cordero with the Padres in 2017

Cordero returned to Fort Wayne in 2015, and he compiled a .243 batting average with five home runs and 34 RBIs in 126 games. Cordero opened the 2016 season with the Lake Elsinore Storm. In July, he was promoted to the San Antonio Missions. He also played four games for the Triple-A El Paso Chihuahuas at the end of the season. In 137 games between the three clubs, he batted .290/.344/.450 with 11 home runs and 54 RBIs. The Padres added him to their 40-man roster after the 2016 season.

Cordero began the 2017 season with El Paso. The Padres promoted Cordero to the Major Leagues on May 27, 2017, as regular center fielder Manuel Margot went to the disabled list with a strained calf. Cordero made his major league debut that day, striking out against Stephen Strasburg as a pinch hitter. Cordero started hot, collecting 19 hits in his first 17 games, but then only had one hit in his final 10 games before he was sent back to El Paso upon Margot's return. Cordero returned to the Padres for 3 more games in July when Margot was on the paternity list but finished the season with El Paso. In 93 games for El Paso, Cordero slashed .326/.369/.603 with 17 home runs and 64 RBIs, and in 30 games for the Padres he batted .228/.276/.424 with three home runs and nine RBIs, making 22 starts in center field and one in left field.

Cordero began 2018 on the disabled list with a groin injury and joined the Padres after he was activated in early April. He was the Padres everyday starter in left field before he was sent to the disabled list on May 28 with forearm soreness. Cordero began a rehab assignment in El Paso in June, but pain in his right elbow led to the diagnosis of a bone spur. Surgery on the elbow ended Cordero's Padres season, but he played in the Dominican Winter League. He finished the regular season hitting .237/.307/.439 with 9 home runs, making 22 starts in left field, 10 in center, and 4 in right. On April 20, he hit the second-longest home run in MLB in 2018, at 489 feet (149 m).

=== Kansas City Royals ===
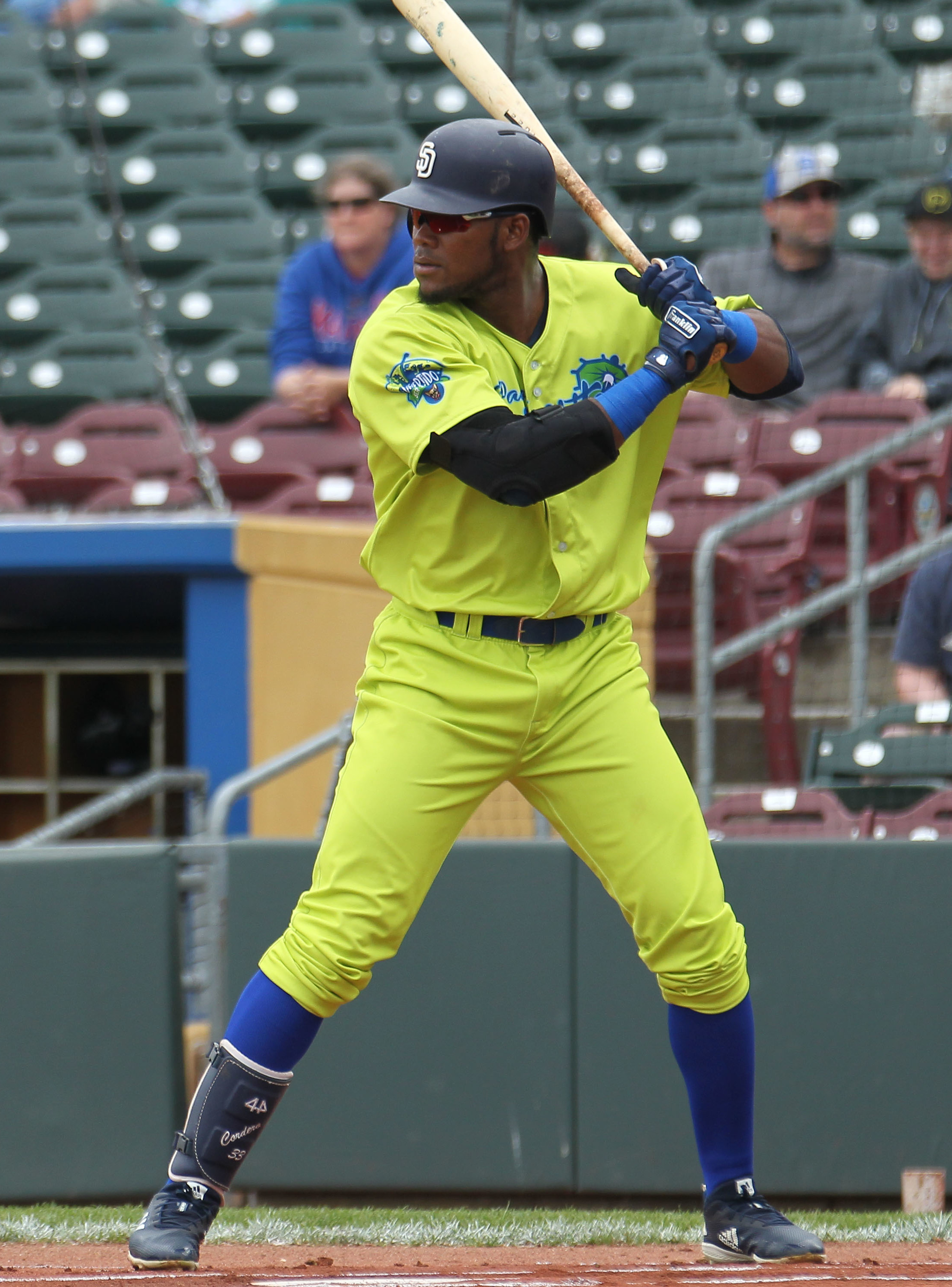
Cordero with El Paso Chihuahuas in 2019

On July 16, 2020, the Padres traded Cordero and Ronald Bolaños to the Kansas City Royals in exchange for Tim Hill. On August 9, 2020, he was placed on the 10-day injured list, but was then transferred to the 45-day injured list on August 10, after suffering a wrist injury. Overall with the 2020 Kansas City Royals, Cordero batted .211 with two home runs and seven RBIs in 16 games.

=== Boston Red Sox ===
On February 10, 2021, the Royals traded Cordero to the Boston Red Sox as part of a three-team trade in which the Royals acquired Andrew Benintendi and cash considerations. The Red Sox also acquired Josh Winckowski and three players to be named later, and the New York Mets acquired Khalil Lee. During spring training, Cordero was on the COVID-19 related injured list from February 22 until March 30. After batting .179 in 34 games with Boston, Cordero was optioned to the Triple-A Worcester Red Sox on May 27. After hitting .329 in 44 games in Triple-A, Cordero was recalled to Boston on July 22. He was optioned back to Worcester on August 16, and recalled briefly in early September. Overall during the regular season, Cordero appeared in 48 games for Boston, batting .189, and 78 games for Worcester, where he had a .300 average. On October 21, Cordero was designated for assignment by the Red Sox; he cleared waivers and was assigned outright to Triple-A four days later.

In spring training in 2022, Cordero competed with Travis Shaw, Rob Refsnyder, Christin Stewart, Jonathan Araúz, and Yolmer Sánchez for one of two available spots on Boston's Opening Day roster. He began the season with Worcester, then was added to Boston's active roster on April 29. Cordero was optioned back to Triple-A on August 2, when the team made several trade deadline moves. Cordero was activated for Boston's neutral-site game of August 21, the MLB Little League Classic, then remained with the team, as Eric Hosmer was placed on the injured list prior to Boston's next game. Cordero was placed on the 60-day injured list on September 7, ending his season, due to a right ankle sprain sustained in a game two days prior. For the season, he appeared in 84 games for Boston and batted .219 with eight home runs and 29 RBIs while playing defensively at first base and in all three outfield positions. He was non-tendered and became a free agent on November 18, 2022.

On December 2, 2022, Cordero signed a minor league contract with the Baltimore Orioles organization. Cordero hit .413 with two home runs in 46 spring training at-bats for Baltimore, but was released by the team on March 27, 2023.

=== New York Yankees ===
On March 30, 2023, Cordero signed a split contract with the New York Yankees that would pay him $1 million in the major leagues and $180,000 in the minor leagues. On April 7, he hit a three-run homer at Camden Yards as his first home run for the Yankees. He went on to become the first player in Yankees history to record four or more homers and 11 or more RBIs in his first seven games with the team. In 24 games for the Yankees, he hit .188/.211/.478 with 6 home runs and 13 RBI. Following the season on November 2, Cordero was removed from the 40–man roster and sent outright to the Triple–A Scranton/Wilkes-Barre RailRiders. He elected free agency on November 6.

=== Saitama Seibu Lions ===
On December 6, 2023, Cordero signed with the Saitama Seibu Lions of Nippon Professional Baseball. In 23 games for the Lions in 2024, he slashed .129/.151/.200 with one home run and four RBI. On October 14, 2024, the Lions announced they would not be renewing Cordero's contract for the 2025 season, thus making him a free agent.

=== Washington Nationals ===
On January 15, 2025, the Washington Nationals signed Cordero to a minor league contract. In 44 appearances for the Triple-A Rochester Red Wings, he batted .213/.289/.333 with four home runs and 17 RBI. Cordero was released by the Nationals organization on June 10.

=== Toros de Tijuana ===
On June 15, 2025, Cordero signed with the Toros de Tijuana of the Mexican League. In 35 games he hit .314/.447/.579 with 8 home runs, 23 RBIs and 4 stolen bases.

== Scouting report ==
Cordero was once considered to have elite speed, leading all the minor leagues in triples in 2016 and 2017, and ranking in the top 3 percent of qualified major league players in sprint speed in 2017. However, his sprint speed in his most recent MLB season (2023) was only in the 53rd percentile. He has also shown elite power, ranking 35th in average batted ball exit velocity in 2017, and 20 percent of his batted balls exiting at or above 105 mph (169 km/h).

== Personal life ==
Cordero is a second cousin to Socrates Brito, who has played in MLB and the KBO League.
