= Tim Hill (baseball) =

American baseball player (born 1990)

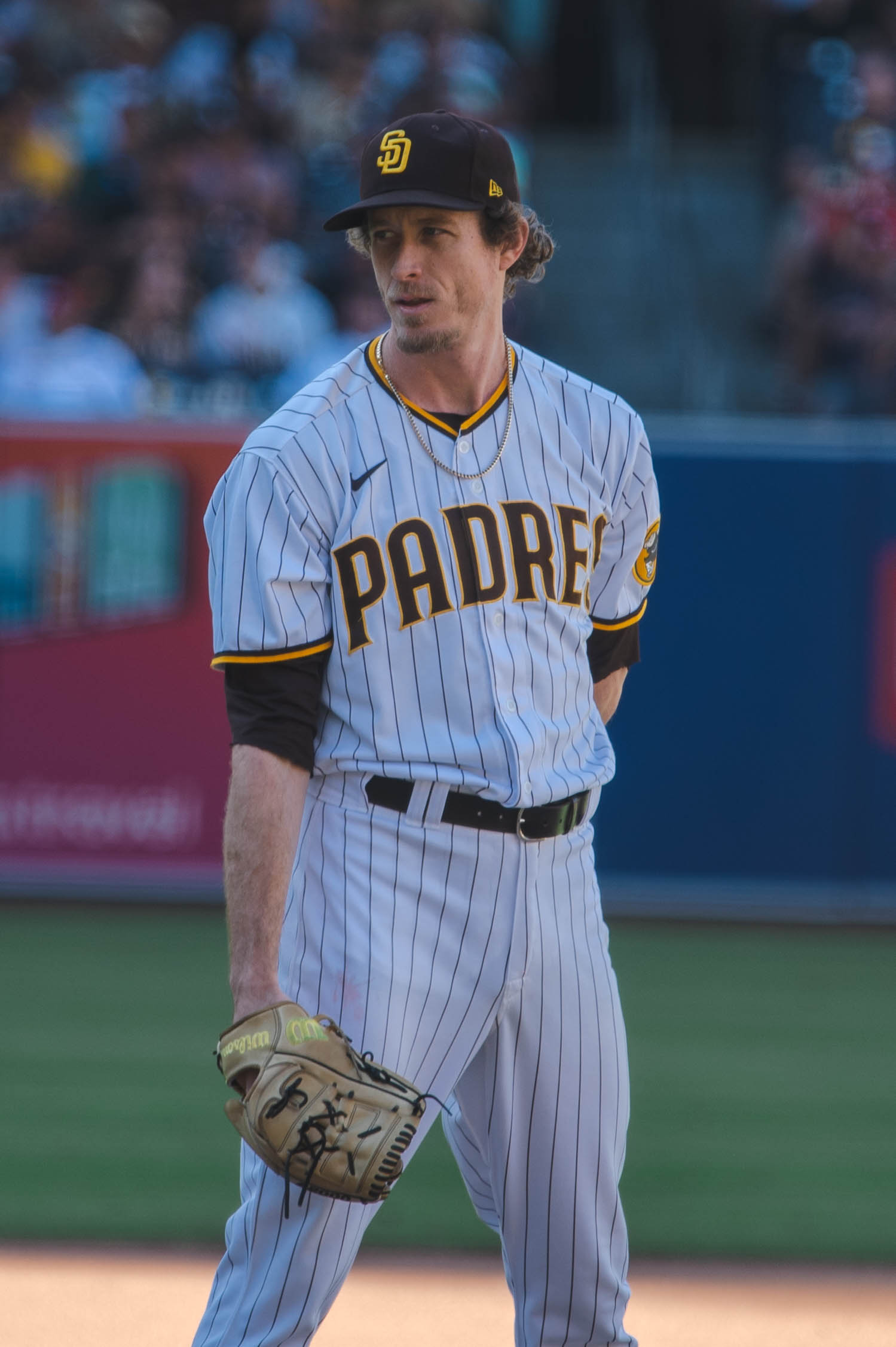
- Hill with the San Diego Padres in 2022

Free agent
- Pitcher
- Born: February 10, 1990 (age 36); Mission Hills, California, U.S.
- Bats: Right Throws: Left

MLB debut
- March 29, 2018, for the Kansas City Royals

MLB statistics (through 2026 season)
- Win–loss record: 29–20
- Earned run average: 3.94
- Strikeouts: 301
- Stats at Baseball Reference

Teams
- Kansas City Royals (2018–2019); San Diego Padres (2020–2023); Chicago White Sox (2024); New York Yankees (2024–2026)

Timothy Hill (born February 10, 1990) is an American professional baseball pitcher who is a free agent. He has played in Major League Baseball (MLB) for the Kansas City Royals, San Diego Padres, Chicago White Sox, and New York Yankees. Hill was selected by the Royals in the 32nd round of the 2014 MLB draft, and made his MLB debut in 2018.

== Amateur career ==
Hill attended Granada Hills Charter High School in Los Angeles, California. Undrafted out of high school, Hill attended junior college at Palomar College his freshman year. He then moved on to four-year Bacone College, an NAIA school. In his senior year at Bacone, he had a 10–2 win–loss record and a 1.89 earned run average (ERA).

== Professional career ==
=== Kansas City Royals ===
The Kansas City Royals selected Hill in the 32nd round of the 2014 Major League Baseball draft. Hill signed and spent 2014 with both the Idaho Falls Chukars and Lexington Legends, posting a combined 3–1 win–loss record and 1.64 ERA in 22 innings pitched. He missed all of 2015 while undergoing treatment for stage 3 Colon cancer. In 2016, he played for the Wilmington Blue Rocks and Northwest Arkansas Naturals, compiling a combined 2–4 record and 3.43 ERA with 62 strikeouts in 63 total innings pitched between both teams, and in 2017, he once again played for both Wilmington and Northwest Arkansas, going 1–2 with a 4.26 ERA in 40 total games between the two clubs. The Royals added him to their 40-man roster after the 2017 season.

Hill made the 25-man roster for the 2018 Royals, and had his MLB debut on Opening Day, March 29, pitching 1/3 of an inning in relief against the Chicago White Sox; he hit the first batter he faced, Leury García. He finished the 2018 season going 1–4 with a 4.53 ERA over 45 2/3 innings. Hill produced a 2–0 record with a 3.61 ERA over 39 2/3 innings for the Royals in 2019.

=== San Diego Padres ===
On July 16, 2020, the Royals traded Hill to the San Diego Padres in exchange for Franchy Cordero and Ronald Bolaños. In the pandemic shortened 2020 season, Hill pitched to a 3–0 record and 4.50 ERA with 20 strikeouts and 6 walks in 18 innings across 23 appearances for the Padres.

Hill made 78 appearances for the Padres in 2021, compiling a 6–6 record and 3.62 ERA with 56 strikeouts across 59 2/3 innings pitched. In 2022, he accumulated a 3.56 ERA with 25 strikeouts across 55 contests.

On January 13, 2023, Hill agreed to a one-year, $1.85 million contract with the Padres, avoiding salary arbitration. In 48 games for San Diego, he recorded a 5.48 ERA with 26 strikeouts in 44 1/3 innings pitched. After missing a month with a sprained left ring finger, Hill returned to the injured list with the same injury on September 11. On September 20, Hill underwent season–ending surgery to clean up scar tissue in the finger. He was non-tendered and became a free agent on November 17.

=== Chicago White Sox ===
Hill signed a one-year, $1.8 million contract with the Chicago White Sox on December 28, 2023. In 27 appearances for Chicago, he struggled to a 5.87 ERA with 13 strikeouts across 23 innings pitched. On June 12, 2024, Hill was designated for assignment by the White Sox. He was released by the organization on June 18.

=== New York Yankees ===
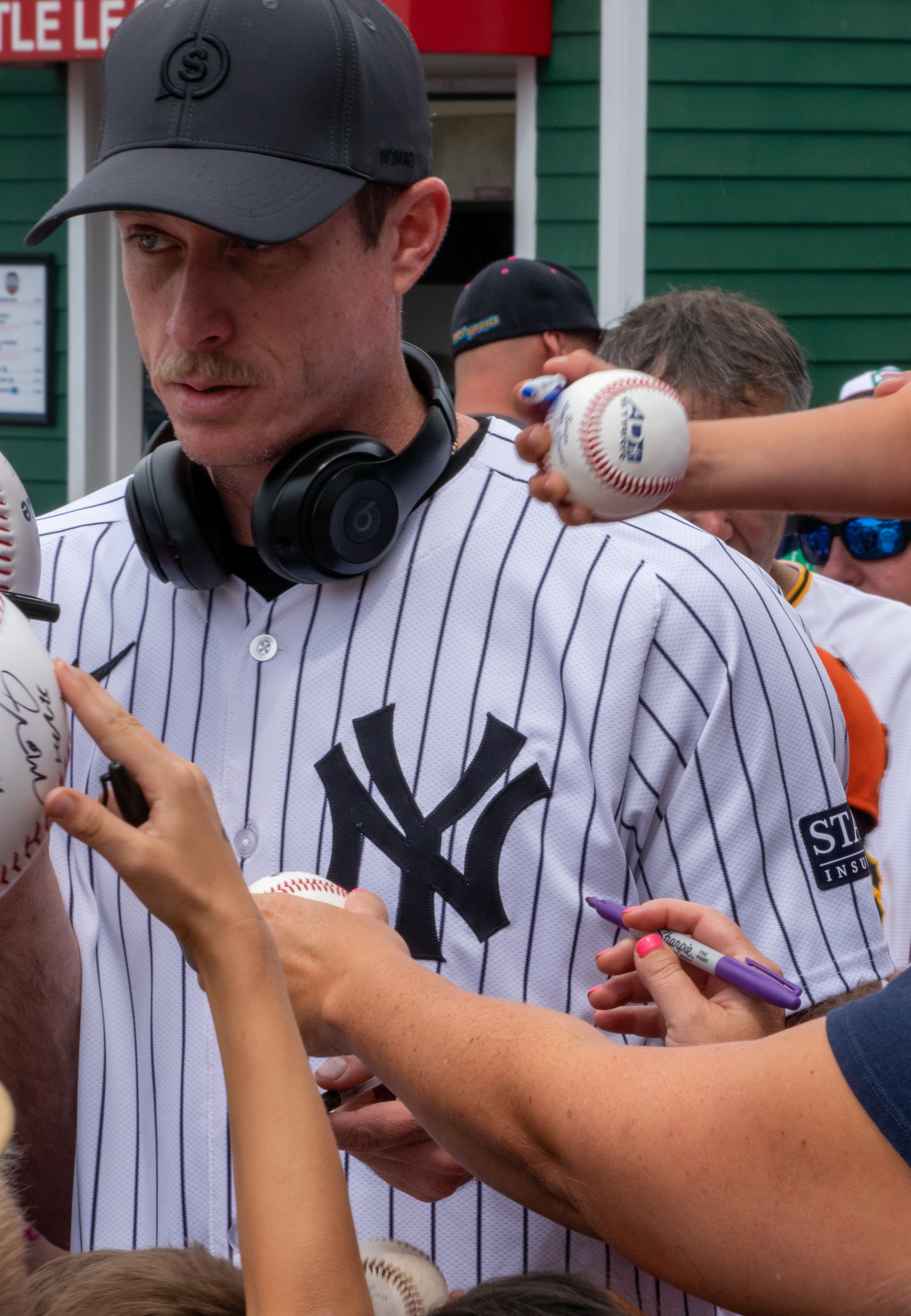
Hill in 2024 with the Yankees

On June 20, 2024, Hill signed a one-year, major league contract with the New York Yankees. In 35 appearances for the Yankees in 2024, he had a career-low 2.05 ERA with 18 strikeouts across 44 innings pitched. He finished the 2024 season going 4–0 with a 3.36 ERA over 67 innings pitched. Hill became a free agent following the season.

On February 8, 2025, Hill re-signed with the Yankees on a one-year, $2.85 million contract with a $3 million club option for 2026. He had a 3.09 ERA and led all Yankees pitchers with 70 appearances. Hill won the Tony Conigliaro Award after the season.

Following the 2025 season, the Yankees exercised their $3 million option on Hill's contract for the 2026 season.

== International career ==
On March 12, 2026, Hill was added to the United States national baseball team for the World Baseball Classic as a substitute for Ryan Yarbrough.

== Personal life ==
Hill's father died of colon cancer in 2006. Hill was diagnosed with colon cancer during spring training of 2015. Half of his colon was removed and he underwent eight months of chemotherapy before being cleared by his doctor in January 2016. Hill has Lynch syndrome.
