= Hunter Dozier =

American baseball player (born 1991)

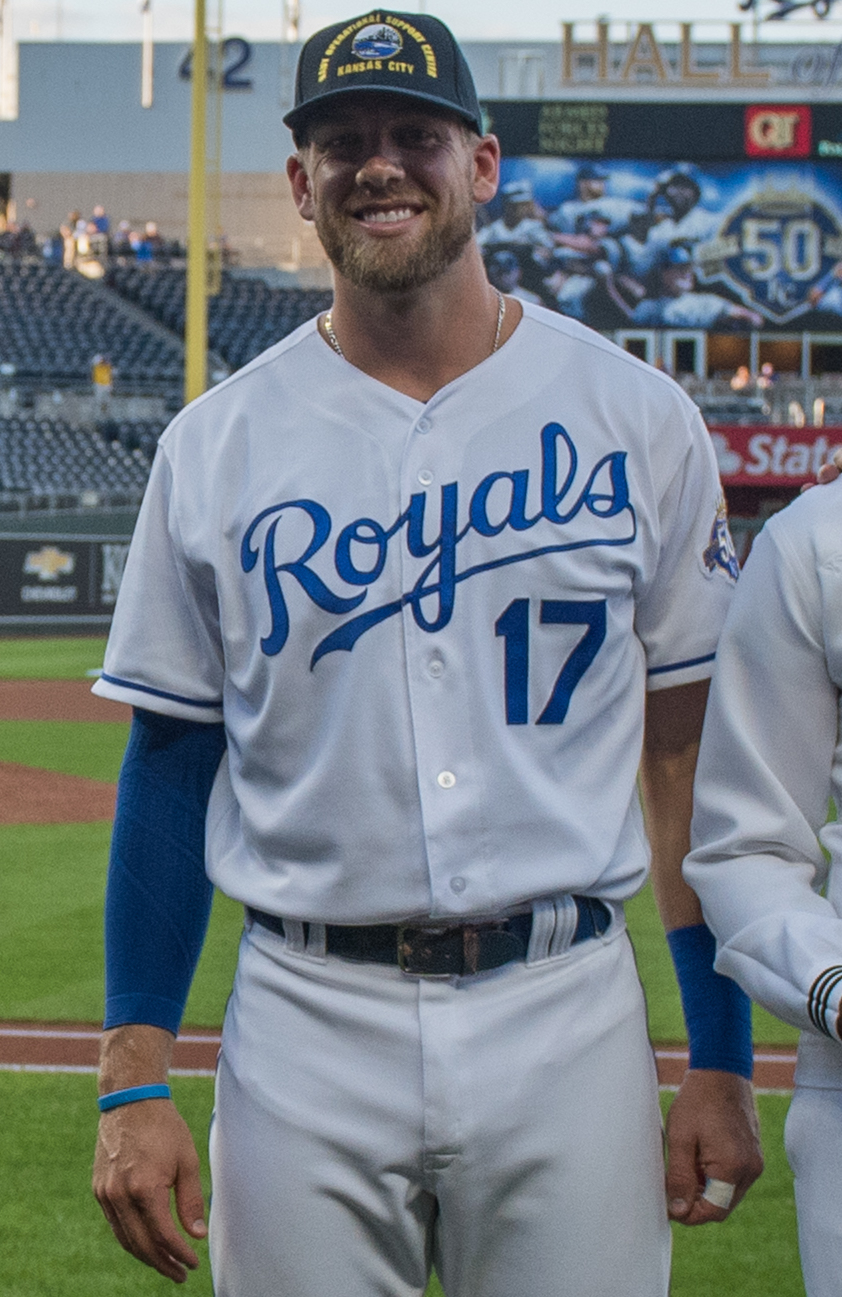
- Dozier with the Kansas City Royals in 2018
- Third baseman / First baseman / Outfielder
- Born: August 22, 1991 (age 34); Wichita Falls, Texas, U.S.
- Batted: Right Threw: Right

MLB debut
- September 12, 2016, for the Kansas City Royals

Last MLB appearance
- May 19, 2023, for the Kansas City Royals

MLB statistics
- Batting average: .238
- Home runs: 73
- Runs batted in: 235
- Stats at Baseball Reference

Teams
- Kansas City Royals (2016, 2018–2023)

Hunter William Dozier (born August 22, 1991) is an American former professional baseball third baseman, outfielder and first baseman. He has previously played in Major League Baseball (MLB) for the Kansas City Royals. The Royals selected Dozier eighth overall in the first round of the 2013 MLB draft after he played college baseball for the Stephen F. Austin Lumberjacks. He made his MLB debut in 2016.

== Amateur career ==
Dozier attended Denton High School in Denton, Texas, where he played for the school's baseball and American football teams; Dozier played shortstop for the baseball team and quarterback in football. His football career was hampered by a broken collarbone in his junior year. He focused on baseball in his senior year of high school having intention to play college baseball.

Dozier went on to Stephen F. Austin State University, where he played college baseball for the Stephen F. Austin Lumberjacks baseball team. In 2013, he was named the Southland Conference Player of the Year and a finalist for the Brooks Wallace Award, given annually to the best shortstop in college baseball.

== Professional career ==
=== Kansas City Royals ===
The Royals selected Dozier with the eighth overall selection in the 2013 Major League Baseball draft. Dozier signed with the Royals for a $2.2 million signing bonus, below the slot value of $3,117,800 allotted for the pick. He reported to the Royals' Arizona League complex before joining the Idaho Falls Chukars of the Rookie-level Pioneer League. He was promoted to the Lexington Legends of the Single-A South Atlantic League in August. In 69 games between Idaho Falls and Lexington, he batted .308 with seven home runs and 52 RBIs.

Dozier began the 2014 season with the Wilmington Blue Rocks of the High-A Carolina League. On June 18, the Royals promoted him to the Northwest Arkansas Naturals of the Double-A Texas League. In 130 games between the two clubs he hit .251 with eight home runs and 60 RBIs. Dozier spent the 2015 season with Northwest Arkansas, compiling a .213 batting average with 12 home runs and 53 RBIs in 128 games.. He returned there to begin the 2016 season before receiving a promotion to the Omaha Storm Chasers of the Triple-A Pacific Coast League in May. Dozier appeared in the 2016 All-Star Futures Game. In 129 games between Northwest Arkansas and Omaha, he slashed .296/.366/.533 with 23 home runs and 75 RBIs.

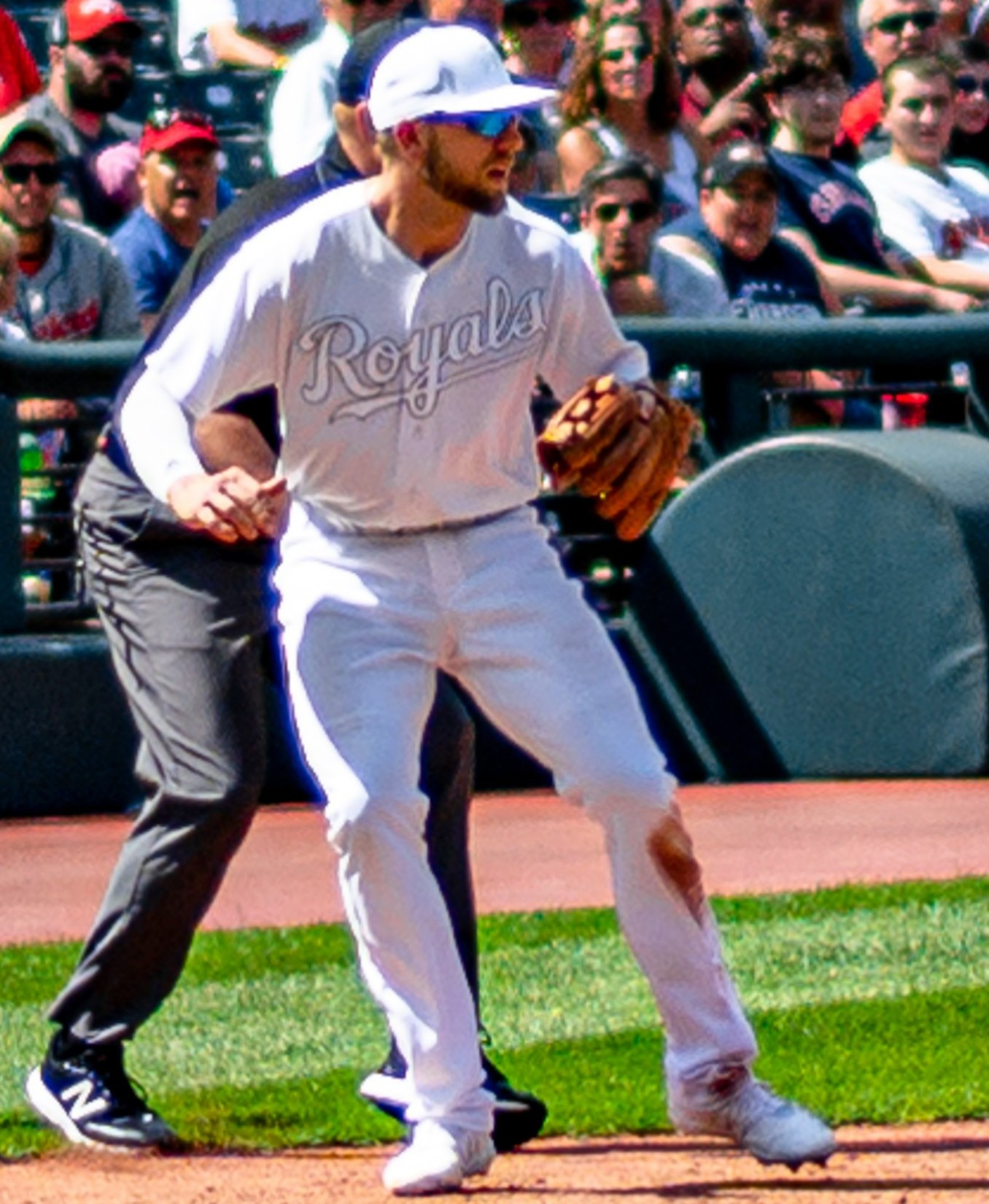
Dozier with the Royals in 2019

The Royals promoted Dozier to the major leagues on September 2, 2016. He made his major league debut on September 12. He recorded his first major league hit on September 16. Dozier began the 2017 season with Omaha. He missed the beginning of the season with a strained oblique muscle, and after playing in ten games, broke the hamate bone in his wrist in June. He played a total of 33 games in the minor league regular season, and was not called up to the major leagues as a part of their September call-ups. After the regular season, he played for the Naranjeros de Hermosillo in the Mexican Pacific League. Dozier began 2018 with Omaha and was recalled by Kansas City on May 14. In 2019, Dozier hit .279 with 26 home runs and 84 RBIs in 139 games. On July 22, 2020, it was announced that Dozier had tested positive for COVID-19. Overall with the 2020 Kansas City Royals, Dozier batted .228 with six home runs and 12 RBIs in 44 games.

On February 28, 2021, Dozier and the Royals agreed to a four-year, $25 million contract extension with a $10 million option for the 2025 season. On May 14, 2021, Dozier was involved in a collision with Chicago White Sox first basemen José Abreu after Dozier hit a popup and collided with Abreu along the first base line. Both Dozier and Abreu left the game, and while Abreu returned to play the next day, Dozier was placed on the seven-day injured list. Playing in a career-high 144 games, Dozier underwhelmed, hitting .216/.285/.394 with 16 home runs and 54 RBIs.

Dozier was one of ten Royals placed on the restricted list prior to a four-day road trip to play the Toronto Blue Jays in July 2022 because he was not vaccinated against COVID-19. Dozier said, "me personally, I don’t do any vaccines. I live a healthy lifestyle. I eat healthy, I work out. I want my body to naturally fight stuff off. I’m not against vaccines, so it’s just a personal preference. I’m not judging anyone who wanted to get it or who didn’t want to get it." Dozier played in 128 games for the Royals in 2022, hitting .236/.292/.387 with 12 home runs and 41 RBIs.

In 2023, Dozier played in 29 games, batting .183/.253/.305 with two home runs and nine RBIs. On May 22, 2023, the Royals designated Dozier for assignment. On May 27, Dozier was released by Kansas City, with the Royals still owing him over $16 million from his 2021 extension.

=== Los Angeles Angels ===
On January 18, 2024, Dozier signed a minor league contract with the Los Angeles Angels. In 48 games for the Triple-A Salt Lake Bees, he hit .222/.268/.394 with seven home runs and 38 RBI. On June 2, Dozier was released by the Angels organization.

== Personal life ==
Dozier and his wife, Amanda, have four children.
