= 2019 Oakland Athletics season =

2019 Oakland Athletics
- American League Wild Card winners
- League: American League
- Division: West
- Ballpark: Oakland Coliseum
- City: Oakland, California
- Record: 97–65 (.599)
- Divisional place: 2nd
- Owners: John Fisher
- General managers: David Forst
- Managers: Bob Melvin
- Television: NBC Sports California (Glen Kuiper, Ken Korach, Vince Cotroneo, Ray Fosse, Mark Mulder, Eric Chavez, Shooty Babitt, Dallas Braden)
- Radio: KTRB; Oakland Athletics Radio Network (Ken Korach, Vince Cotroneo, Ray Fosse, Coco Crisp)

The 2019 Oakland Athletics season was the 119th season for the Oakland Athletics franchise, all as members of the American League, and their 52nd season in Oakland. The A's clinched a spot in the ALWC Game on September 27; however, they lost to the Tampa Bay Rays in that game 5–1. The 2019 season was the final season the team shared the Coliseum with the Oakland Raiders. The Raiders relocated to Las Vegas prior to the following season leaving the Coliseum as a baseball-only facility for the first time since 1994.

== Standings ==
=== American League West ===
AL West
| Team | W | L | Pct. | GB | Home | Road |
|---|---|---|---|---|---|---|
| Houston Astros | 107 | 55 | .660 | — | 60‍–‍21 | 47‍–‍34 |
| Oakland Athletics | 97 | 65 | .599 | 10 | 52‍–‍29 | 45‍–‍36 |
| Texas Rangers | 78 | 84 | .481 | 29 | 45‍–‍36 | 33‍–‍48 |
| Los Angeles Angels | 72 | 90 | .444 | 35 | 38‍–‍43 | 34‍–‍47 |
| Seattle Mariners | 68 | 94 | .420 | 39 | 35‍–‍46 | 33‍–‍48 |

=== American League Wild Card ===
Division leaders
| Team | W | L | Pct. |
|---|---|---|---|
| Houston Astros | 107 | 55 | .660 |
| New York Yankees | 103 | 59 | .636 |
| Minnesota Twins | 101 | 61 | .623 |

Wild Card teams (Top 2 teams qualify for postseason)
| Team | W | L | Pct. | GB |
|---|---|---|---|---|
| Oakland Athletics | 97 | 65 | .599 | +1 |
| Tampa Bay Rays | 96 | 66 | .593 | — |
| Cleveland Indians | 93 | 69 | .574 | 3 |
| Boston Red Sox | 84 | 78 | .519 | 12 |
| Texas Rangers | 78 | 84 | .481 | 18 |
| Chicago White Sox | 72 | 89 | .447 | 23½ |
| Los Angeles Angels | 72 | 90 | .444 | 24 |
| Seattle Mariners | 68 | 94 | .420 | 28 |
| Toronto Blue Jays | 67 | 95 | .414 | 29 |
| Kansas City Royals | 59 | 103 | .364 | 37 |
| Baltimore Orioles | 54 | 108 | .333 | 42 |
| Detroit Tigers | 47 | 114 | .292 | 48½ |

=== Record against opponents ===
2019 American League record Source: MLB Standings Grid – 2019
| Team | BAL | BOS | CWS | CLE | DET | HOU | KC | LAA | MIN | NYY | OAK | SEA | TB | TEX | TOR | NL |
|---|---|---|---|---|---|---|---|---|---|---|---|---|---|---|---|---|
| Baltimore | — | 7–12 | 3–3 | 3–4 | 3–4 | 2–4 | 3–3 | 4–3 | 0–6 | 2–17 | 1–6 | 3–4 | 7–12 | 1–6 | 8–11 | 7–13 |
| Boston | 12–7 | — | 5–2 | 3–3 | 5–2 | 2–4 | 5–1 | 4–3 | 3–3 | 5–14 | 4–3 | 4–3 | 7–12 | 4–3 | 11–8 | 10–10 |
| Chicago | 3–3 | 2–5 | — | 11–8 | 12–6 | 4–3 | 9–10 | 2–5 | 6–13 | 4–3 | 1–5 | 2–4 | 2–4 | 4–3 | 4–3 | 6–14 |
| Cleveland | 4–3 | 3–3 | 8–11 | — | 18–1 | 3–4 | 12–7 | 6–0 | 10–9 | 4–3 | 1–5 | 5–1 | 1–6 | 4–3 | 6–1 | 8–12 |
| Detroit | 4–3 | 2–5 | 6–12 | 1–18 | — | 1–6 | 10–9 | 3–3 | 5–14 | 3–3 | 1–6 | 1–6 | 2–4 | 0–6 | 3–4 | 5–15 |
| Houston | 4–2 | 4–2 | 3–4 | 4–3 | 6–1 | — | 5–1 | 14–5 | 3–4 | 4–3 | 11–8 | 18–1 | 3–4 | 13–6 | 4–2 | 11–9 |
| Kansas City | 3–3 | 1–5 | 10–9 | 7–12 | 9–10 | 1–5 | — | 2–4 | 5–14 | 2–5 | 2–5 | 2–5 | 3–4 | 2–5 | 1–6 | 9–11 |
| Los Angeles | 3–4 | 3–4 | 5–2 | 0–6 | 3–3 | 5–14 | 4–2 | — | 1–5 | 2–5 | 6–13 | 10–9 | 3–4 | 9–10 | 6–1 | 12–8 |
| Minnesota | 6–0 | 3–3 | 13–6 | 9–10 | 14–5 | 4–3 | 14–5 | 5–1 | — | 2–4 | 3–4 | 5–2 | 5–2 | 6–1 | 4–3 | 8–12 |
| New York | 17–2 | 14–5 | 3–4 | 3–4 | 3–3 | 3–4 | 5–2 | 5–2 | 4–2 | — | 2–4 | 6–1 | 12–7 | 3–3 | 11–8 | 12–8 |
| Oakland | 6–1 | 3–4 | 5–1 | 5–1 | 6–1 | 8–11 | 5–2 | 13–6 | 4–3 | 4–2 | — | 10–9 | 4–3 | 13–6 | 0–6 | 11–9 |
| Seattle | 4–3 | 3–4 | 4–2 | 1–5 | 6–1 | 1–18 | 5–2 | 9–10 | 2–5 | 1–6 | 9–10 | — | 2–4 | 8–11 | 4–2 | 9–11 |
| Tampa Bay | 12–7 | 12–7 | 4–2 | 6–1 | 4–2 | 4–3 | 4–3 | 4–3 | 2–5 | 7–12 | 3–4 | 4–2 | — | 3–3 | 13–6 | 14–6 |
| Texas | 6–1 | 3–4 | 3–4 | 3–4 | 6–0 | 6–13 | 5–2 | 10–9 | 1–6 | 3–3 | 6–13 | 11–8 | 3–3 | — | 3–3 | 9–11 |
| Toronto | 11–8 | 8–11 | 3–4 | 1–6 | 4–3 | 2–4 | 6–1 | 1–6 | 3–4 | 8–11 | 6–0 | 2–4 | 6–13 | 3–3 | — | 3–17 |

== Game log ==
2019 Game Log
Total: 97–65 (Home: 52–29; Away: 45–36)
March: 3–3 (Home: 3–3; Away: 0–0)

| # | Date | Opponent | Score | Win | Loss | Save | Attendance | Record | Streak |
|---|---|---|---|---|---|---|---|---|---|
| 1 | March 20 | Mariners (Game played in Tokyo) | 7–9 | Gonzales (1–0) | **Fiers** (0–1) | Strickland (1) | 45,787 | 0–1 | L1 |
| 2 | March 21 | Mariners (Game played in Tokyo) | 4–5 (12) | Rosscup (1–0) | **Buchter** (0–1) | Strickland (2) | 46,451 | 0–2 | L2 |
| 3 | March 28 | Angels | 4–0 | **Fiers** (1–1) | Cahill (0–1) | — | 22,691 | 1–2 | W1 |
| 4 | March 29 | Angels | 2–6 | Robles (1–0) | **Soria** (0–1) | — | 22,585 | 1–3 | L1 |
| 5 | March 30 | Angels | 4–2 | **Anderson** (1–0) | Peña (0–1) | **Treinen** (1) | 16,051 | 2–3 | W1 |
| 6 | March 31 | Angels | 2–1 | **Montas** (1–0) | Skaggs (0–1) | **Treinen** (2) | 23,265 | 3–3 | W2 |

April: 11–15 (Home: 7–5; Away: 4–10)

| # | Date | Opponent | Score | Win | Loss | Save | Attendance | Record | Streak |
|---|---|---|---|---|---|---|---|---|---|
| 7 | April 1 | Red Sox | 7–0 | **Brooks** (1–0) | Price (0–1) | — | 12,417 | 4–3 | W3 |
| 8 | April 2 | Red Sox | 1–0 | **Fiers** (2–1) | Sale (0–2) | **Treinen** (3) | 12,721 | 5–3 | W4 |
| 9 | April 3 | Red Sox | 3–6 | Barnes (1–0) | **Rodney** (0–1) | Brasier (1) | 14,207 | 5–4 | L1 |
| 10 | April 4 | Red Sox | 7–3 | **Anderson** (2–0) | Rodríguez (0–2) | — | 15,095 | 6–4 | W1 |
| 11 | April 5 | @ Astros | 2–3 | McHugh (1–1) | **Montas** (1–1) | Osuna (2) | 43,165 | 6–5 | L1 |
| 12 | April 6 | @ Astros | 0–6 | Miley (1–1) | **Brooks** (1–1) | — | 34,487 | 6–6 | L2 |
| 13 | April 7 | @ Astros | 8–9 | Osuna (1–0) | **Treinen** (0–1) | — | 34,902 | 6–7 | L3 |
| 14 | April 8 | @ Orioles | 4–12 | Cashner (2–1) | **Estrada** (0–1) | — | 6,585 | 6–8 | L4 |
| 15 | April 9 | @ Orioles | 13–2 | **Anderson** (3–0) | Means (1–1) | — | 7,738 | 7–8 | W1 |
| 16 | April 10 | @ Orioles | 10–3 | **Montas** (2–1) | Straily (0–1) | — | 7,974 | 8–8 | W2 |
| 17 | April 11 | @ Orioles | 8–5 | **Brooks** (2–1) | Bundy (0–1) | **Treinen** (4) | 8,374 | 9–8 | W3 |
| 18 | April 12 | @ Rangers | 8–6 | **Trivino** (1–0) | Martin (0–1) | **Treinen** (5) | 24,817 | 10–8 | W4 |
| – | April 13 | @ Rangers | Postponed (rain); Rescheduled for June 8 as part of a doubleheader. | | | | | | |
| 19 | April 14 | @ Rangers | 7–8 | Springs (2–0) | **Soria** (0–2) | Leclerc (3) | 26,350 | 10–9 | L1 |
| 20 | April 16 | Astros | 1–9 | McHugh (3–1) | **Estrada** (0–2) | — | 12,270 | 10–10 | L2 |
| 21 | April 17 | Astros | 2–1 | **Montas** (3–1) | Miley (1–2) | **Treinen** (6) | 11,323 | 11–10 | W1 |
| 22 | April 19 | Blue Jays | 1–5 | Stroman (1–3) | **Brooks** (2–2) | — | 15,128 | 11–11 | L1 |
| 23 | April 20 | Blue Jays | 1–10 | Gaviglio (2–0) | **Fiers** (2–2) | — | 31,140 | 11–12 | L2 |
| 24 | April 21 | Blue Jays | 4–5 | Hudson (1–1 | **Anderson** (3–1) | Giles (7) | 16,015 | 11–13 | L3 |
| 25 | April 22 | Rangers | 6–1 | **Bassitt** (1–0) | Minor (2–2) | — | 8,073 | 12–13 | W1 |
| 26 | April 23 | Rangers | 11–5 | **Montas** (4–1) | Lynn (2–2) | — | 10,496 | 13–13 | W2 |
| 27 | April 24 | Rangers | 6–5 | **Treinen** (1–1) | Martin (0–2) | — | 18,610 | 14–13 | W3 |
| 28 | April 26 | @ Blue Jays | 2–4 | Giles (1–1) | **Petit** (0–1) | — | 28,688 | 14–14 | L1 |
| 29 | April 27 | @ Blue Jays | 1–7 | Sanchez (3–1) | **Anderson** (3–2) | — | 22,254 | 14–15 | L2 |
| 30 | April 28 | @ Blue Jays | 4–5 (11) | Luciano (1–0) | **Treinen** (1–2) | — | 18,557 | 14–16 | L3 |
| 31 | April 29 | @ Red Sox | 4–9 | Brasier (1–0) | **Montas** (4–2) | Barnes (2) | 30,866 | 14–17 | L4 |
| 32 | April 30 | @ Red Sox | 1–5 | Porcello (2–3) | **Brooks** (2–3) | — | 31,754 | 14–18 | L5 |

May: 16–10 (Home: 8–5; Away: 8–5)

| # | Date | Opponent | Score | Win | Loss | Save | Attendance | Record | Streak |
|---|---|---|---|---|---|---|---|---|---|
| 33 | May 1 | @ Red Sox | 3–7 | Walden (4–0) | **Fiers** (2–3) | — | 33,708 | 14–19 | L6 |
| 34 | May 3 | @ Pirates | 14–1 | **Anderson** (4–2) | Musgrove (1–3) | — | 16,428 | 15–19 | W1 |
| 35 | May 4 | @ Pirates | 4–6 | Feliz (1–0) | **Wendelken** (0–1) | Vázquez (9) | 26,447 | 15–20 | L1 |
| 36 | May 5 | @ Pirates | 3–5 (13) | Lyons (1–0) | **Rodney** (0–2) | — | 18,517 | 15–21 | L2 |
| 37 | May 7 | Reds | 2–0 | **Fiers** (3–3) | Mahle (0–5) | — | 11,794 | 16–21 | W1 |
| 38 | May 8 | Reds | 5–4 (13) | **Hendriks** (1–0) | Stephenson (2–1) | — | 9,096 | 17–21 | W2 |
| 39 | May 9 | Reds | 0–3 | Roark (3–1) | **Bassitt** (1–1) | Iglesias (7) | 19,694 | 17–22 | L1 |
| 40 | May 10 | Indians | 4–3 (12) | **Soria** (1–2) | Hand (2–2) | — | 36,913 | 18–22 | W1 |
| 41 | May 11 | Indians | 3–2 | **Treinen** (2–2) | Cole (0–1) | — | 18,278 | 19–22 | W2 |
| 42 | May 12 | Indians | 3–5 | Rodríguez (1–2) | **Mengden** (0–1) | Hand (11) | 18,891 | 19–23 | L1 |
| 43 | May 13 | @ Mariners | 5–6 (10) | Brennan (2–2) | **Soria** (1–3) | — | 12,520 | 19–24 | L2 |
| 44 | May 14 | @ Mariners | 3–4 | Leake (3–4) | **Anderson** (4–3) | Elías (5) | 11,365 | 19–25 | L3 |
| 45 | May 16 | @ Tigers | 17–3 | **Bassitt** (2–1) | Turnbull (2–3) | — | 18,527 | 20–25 | W1 |
| 46 | May 17 | @ Tigers | 7–2 | **Montas** (5–2) | Norris (2–2) | — | 18,746 | 21–25 | W2 |
| 47 | May 18 | @ Tigers | 4–1 | **Mengden** (1–1) | Boyd (4–4) | **Treinen** (7) | 22,913 | 22–25 | W3 |
| – | May 19 | @ Tigers | Suspended (inclement weather). Continuation scheduled for September 6 in Oakland.^{[a]} | | | | | | |
| 49 | May 20 | @ Indians | 6–4 | **Anderson** (5–3) | Carrasco (4–4) | **Treinen** (8) | 12,563 | 23–25 | W5 |
| 50 | May 21 | @ Indians | 5–3 | **Hendriks** (2–0) | Bauer (4–3) | **Treinen** (9) | 13,705 | 24–25 | W6 |
| 51 | May 22 | @ Indians | 7–2 | **Montas** (6–2) | Rodríguez (1–4) | — | 17,010 | 25–25 | W7 |
| 52 | May 24 | Mariners | 6–2 | **Trivino** (2–0) | LeBlanc (2–2) | — | 12,902 | 26–25 | W8 |
| 53 | May 25 | Mariners | 6–5 | **Fiers** (4–3) | Kikuchi (3–2) | **Treinen** (10) | 18,975 | 27–25 | W9 |
| 54 | May 26 | Mariners | 7–1 | **Anderson** (6–3) | Leake (3–6) | — | 14,664 | 28–25 | W10 |
| 55 | May 27 | Angels | 8–5 | **Bassitt** (3–1) | Cahill (2–5) | **Treinen** (11) | 20,409 | 29–25 | W11 |
| 56 | May 28 | Angels | 4–6 | Buttrey (3–2) | **Soria** (1–4) | Robles (6) | 13,060 | 29–26 | L1 |
| 57 | May 29 | Angels | 7–12 (11) | Ramirez (2–0) | **Trivino** (2–1) | — | 21,185 | 29–27 | L2 |
| 58 | May 31 | Astros | 2–3 | Rondón (3–1) | **Trivino** (2–2) | Osuna (16) | 14,519 | 29–28 | L3 |

June: 17–11 (Home: 6–6; Away: 11–5)

| # | Date | Opponent | Score | Win | Loss | Save | Attendance | Record | Streak |
|---|---|---|---|---|---|---|---|---|---|
| 59 | June 1 | Astros | 1–5 | Verlander (9–2) | **Anderson** (6–4) | — | 20,425 | 29–29 | L4 |
| 60 | June 2 | Astros | 4–6 (12) | James (3–0) | **Trivino** (2–3) | — | 23,144 | 29–30 | L5 |
| 61 | June 4 | @ Angels | 4–2 | **Montas** (7–2) | Canning (2–2) | **Treinen** (12) | 36,009 | 30–30 | W1 |
| 62 | June 5 | @ Angels | 9–10 | Robles (3–0) | **Trivino** (2–4) | — | 36,065 | 30–31 | L1 |
| 63 | June 6 | @ Angels | 7–4 | **Fiers** (5–3) | Skaggs (4–6) | — | 34,109 | 31–31 | W1 |
| 64 | June 7 | @ Rangers | 5–3 | **Petit** (1–1) | Leclerc (1–2) | **Treinen** (13) | 25,120 | 32–31 | W2 |
| 65 | June 8 (1) | @ Rangers | 5–10 | Springs (4–1) | **Blackburn** (0–1) | — | 22,327 | 32–32 | L1 |
| 66 | June 8 (2) | @ Rangers | 1–3 | Sampson (5–3) | **Bassitt** (3–2) | — | 39,514 | 32–33 | L2 |
| 67 | June 9 | @ Rangers | 9–8 | **Montas** (8–2) | Smyly (1–5) | **Treinen** (14) | 20,358 | 33–33 | W1 |
| 68 | June 10 | @ Rays | 2–6 | Morton (8–0) | **Anderson** (0–1) | — | 16,091 | 33–34 | L1 |
| 69 | June 11 | @ Rays | 4–3 | **Fiers** (6–3) | Pagán (1–1) | **Treinen** (15) | 11,132 | 34–34 | W1 |
| 70 | June 12 | @ Rays | 6–2 | **Hendriks** (3–0) | Kolarek (2–2) | — | 17,946 | 35–34 | W2 |
| 71 | June 14 | Mariners | 2–9 | Gonzales (7–6) | **Bassitt** (3–3) | — | 21,387 | 35–35 | L1 |
| 72 | June 15 | Mariners | 11–2 | **Montas** (9–2) | Bautista (0–1) | — | 14,846 | 36–35 | W1 |
| 73 | June 16 | Mariners | 3–6 | Leake (6–6) | **Trivino** (2–5) | Elías (7) | 30,242 | 36–36 | L1 |
| 74 | June 17 | Orioles | 3–2 | **Fiers** (7–3) | Cashner (6–3) | **Treinen** (16) | 12,345 | 37–36 | W1 |
| 75 | June 18 | Orioles | 16–2 | **Anderson** (7–4) | Ynoa (0–4) | — | 14,310 | 38–36 | W2 |
| 76 | June 19 | Orioles | 8–3 | **Bassitt** (4–3) | Rogers (0–1) | — | 15,341 | 39–36 | W3 |
| 77 | June 20 | Rays | 5–4 | **Trivino** (3–5) | Castillo (1–5) | — | 12,351 | 40–36 | W4 |
| 78 | June 21 | Rays | 3–5 | Pruitt (1–0) | **Anderson** (0–2) | Pagán (4) | 16,126 | 40–37 | L1 |
| 79 | June 22 | Rays | 4–2 | **Petit** (2–1) | Castillo (1–6) | **Hendriks** (1) | 26,623 | 41–37 | W1 |
| 80 | June 23 | Rays | 2–8 | Yarbrough (6–3) | **Anderson** (7–5) | — | 17,006 | 41–38 | L1 |
| 81 | June 25 | @ Cardinals | 7–3 | **Wendelken** (1–1) | Flaherty (4–5) | — | 40,556 | 42–38 | W1 |
| 82 | June 26 | @ Cardinals | 2–0 | **Mengden** (2–1) | Wainwright (5–7) | **Hendriks** (2) | 44,871 | 43–38 | W2 |
| 83 | June 27 | @ Angels | 3–8 | Canning (3–4) | **Anderson** (0–3) | — | 40,231 | 43–39 | L1 |
| 84 | June 28 | @ Angels | 7–2 | **Fiers** (8–3) | Ramirez (3–1) | — | 41,913 | 44–39 | W1 |
| 85 | June 29 | @ Angels | 4–0 | **Anderson** (8–5) | Skaggs (7–7) | — | 41,447 | 45–39 | W2 |
| 86 | June 30 | @ Angels | 12–3 | **Bassitt** (5–3) | Heaney (1–2) | — | 37,668 | 46–39 | W3 |

July: 15–9 (Home: 10–4; Away: 5–5)

| # | Date | Opponent | Score | Win | Loss | Save | Attendance | Record | Streak |
|---|---|---|---|---|---|---|---|---|---|
| 87 | July 2 | Twins | 8–6 | **Mengden** (3–1) | Odorizzi (10–4) | **Hendriks** (3) | 13,926 | 47–39 | W4 |
| 88 | July 3 | Twins | 3–4 (12) | Parker (1–2) | **Treinen** (2–3) | Rogers (11) | 31,570 | 47–40 | L1 |
| 89 | July 4 | Twins | 7–2 | **Wang** (1–0) | Berríos (8–5) | — | 20,836 | 48–40 | W1 |
| 90 | July 5 | @ Mariners | 5–2 | **Anderson** (9–5) | Kikuchi (4–6) | **Hendriks** (4) | 19,712 | 49–40 | W2 |
| 91 | July 6 | @ Mariners | 3–6 | Gonzales (10–7) | **Bassitt** (5–4) | — | 24,298 | 49–41 | L1 |
| 92 | July 7 | @ Mariners | 7–4 | **Mengden** (4–1) | Carasiti (0–1) | **Hendriks** (5) | 25,816 | 50–41 | W1 |
| - | July 9 | **90th All-Star Game in Cleveland, OH** | | | | | | | |
| 93 | July 12 | White Sox | 5–1 | **Fiers** (9–3) | Nova (4–8) | **Hendriks** (6) | 18,504 | 51–41 | W2 |
| 94 | July 13 | White Sox | 13–2 | **Bassitt** (6–4) | Covey (1–5) | — | 22,222 | 52–41 | W3 |
| 95 | July 14 | White Sox | 3–2 | **Hendriks** (4–0) | Fry (1–4) | — | 20,350 | 53–41 | W4 |
| 96 | July 16 | Mariners | 9–2 | **Mengden** (5–1) | Gonzales (10–8) | — | 18,718 | 54–41 | W5 |
| 97 | July 17 | Mariners | 10–2 | **Bailey** (8–6) | Milone (1–4) | — | 19,161 | 55–41 | W6 |
| 98 | July 18 | @ Twins | 3–6 | Gibson (9–4) | **Petit** (2–2) | Rogers (14) | 28,432 | 55–42 | L1 |
| 99 | July 19 | @ Twins | 5–3 | **Bassitt** (7–4) | Harper (3–2) | **Hendriks** (7) | 31,082 | 56–42 | W1 |
| 100 | July 20 | @ Twins | 5–4 | **Treinen** (3–3) | Rogers (2–2) | **Hendriks** (8) | 32,720 | 57–42 | W2 |
| 101 | July 21 | @ Twins | 6–7 | Stewart (2–1) | **Hendriks** (4–1) | — | 34,070 | 57–43 | L1 |
| 102 | July 22 | @ Astros | 1–11 | Cole (11–5) | **Bailey** (8–7) | — | 41,534 | 57–44 | L2 |
| 103 | July 23 | @ Astros | 4–3 (11) | **Petit** (3–2) | McHugh (3–5) | — | 39,204 | 58–44 | W1 |
| 104 | July 24 | @ Astros | 2–4 | Verlander (13–4) | **Bassitt** (7–5) | Osuna (23) | 41,838 | 58–45 | L1 |
| 105 | July 25 | Rangers | 3–11 | Jurado (6–6) | **Anderson** (9–6) | — | 11,854 | 58–46 | L2 |
| 106 | July 26 | Rangers | 2–5 | Lynn (13–6) | **Mengden** (5–2) | Martin (4) | 14,952 | 58–47 | L3 |
| 107 | July 27 | Rangers | 5–4 | **Bailey** (9–7) | Sampson (6–8) | **Hendriks** (9) | 36,468 | 59–47 | W1 |
| 108 | July 28 | Rangers | 6–5 | **Treinen** (4–3) | Leclerc (1–3) | — | 18,906 | 60–47 | W2 |
| 109 | July 30 | Brewers | 3–2 (10) | **Treinen** (5–3) | Hader (1–4) | — | 17,291 | 61–47 | W3 |
| 110 | July 31 | Brewers | 2–4 | Lyles (6–7) | **Anderson** (9–7) | Hader (24) | 14,864 | 61–48 | L1 |

August: 17–9 (Home: 9–3; Away: 8–6)

| # | Date | Opponent | Score | Win | Loss | Save | Attendance | Record | Streak |
|---|---|---|---|---|---|---|---|---|---|
| 111 | August 1 | Brewers | 5–3 | **Treinen** (6–3) | Hader (1–5) | **Hendriks** (10) | 17,029 | 62–48 | W1 |
| 112 | August 3 | Cardinals | 8–3 | **Fiers** (10–3) | Hudson (10–6) | — | 24,851 | 63–48 | W2 |
| 113 | August 4 | Cardinals | 4–2 | **Roark** (7–7) | Wainwright (7–8) | **Hendriks** (11) | 24,603 | 64–48 | W3 |
| 114 | August 5 | @ Cubs | 5–6 | Wick (2–0) | **Treinen** (6–4) | Phelps (1) | 40,721 | 64–49 | L1 |
| 115 | August 6 | @ Cubs | 11–4 | **Anderson** (10–7) | Lester (9–8) | — | 40,627 | 65–49 | W1 |
| 116 | August 7 | @ Cubs | 1–10 | Quintana (10–7) | **Bailey** (9–8) | — | 41,179 | 65–50 | L1 |
| 117 | August 9 | @ White Sox | 7–0 | **Fiers** (11–3) | Detwiler (1–3) | — | 18,318 | 66–50 | W1 |
| 118 | August 10 | @ White Sox | 2–3 | López (7–9) | **Roark** (7–8) | Colomé (23) | 27,026 | 66–51 | L1 |
| 119 | August 11 | @ White Sox | 2–0 | **Bassitt** (8–5) | Giolito (12–6) | **Hendriks** (12) | 30,951 | 67–51 | W1 |
| 120 | August 13 | @ Giants | 2–3 | Bumgarner (8–7) | **Anderson** (10–8) | Smith (29) | 36,663 | 67–52 | L1 |
| 121 | August 14 | @ Giants | 9–5 | **Bailey** (10–8) | Beede (3–7) | **Hendriks** (13) | 39,511 | 68–52 | W1 |
| 122 | August 15 | Astros | 7–6 | **Diekman** (1–6) | Devenski (2–2) | **Hendriks** (14) | 15,323 | 69–52 | W2 |
| 123 | August 16 | Astros | 3–2 (13) | **Trivino** (4–5) | Sneed (0–1) | — | 22,768 | 70–52 | W3 |
| 124 | August 17 | Astros | 8–4 | **Bassitt** (9–5) | Armenteros (1–1) | — | 21,428 | 71–52 | W4 |
| 125 | August 18 | Astros | 1–4 | Greinke (13–4) | **Anderson** (10–9) | Osuna (27) | 22,372 | 71–53 | L1 |
| 126 | August 20 | Yankees | 6–2 | **Bailey** (11–8) | Germán (16–3) | — | 21,471 | 72–53 | W1 |
| 127 | August 21 | Yankees | 6–4 | **Fiers** (12–3) | Happ (10–8) | **Hendriks** (15) | 22,017 | 73–53 | W2 |
| 128 | August 22 | Yankees | 5–3 | **Roark** (8–8) | Tanaka (9–7) | **Soria** (1) | 24,758 | 74–53 | W3 |
| 129 | August 24 | Giants | 5–10 | Coonrod (3–0) | **Petit** (3–3) | — | 53,367 | 74–54 | L1 |
| 130 | August 25 | Giants | 4–5 | Coonrod (4–0) | **Diekman** (1–7) | Smith (30) | 47,321 | 74–55 | L2 |
| 131 | August 26 | @ Royals | 19–4 | **Bailey** (12–8) | Keller (7–14) | — | 13,595 | 75–55 | W1 |
| 132 | August 27 | @ Royals | 2–1 | **Fiers** (13–3) | Montgomery (3–7) | **Hendriks** (16) | 13,669 | 76–55 | W2 |
| 133 | August 28 | @ Royals | 4–6 | Hill (2–0) | **Treinen** (6–5) | Kennedy (23) | 15,049 | 76–56 | L1 |
| 134 | August 29 | @ Royals | 9–8 | **Petit** (4–3) | Sparkman (3–10) | **Hendriks** (17) | 13,844 | 77–56 | W1 |
| 135 | August 30 | @ Yankees | 8–2 | **Anderson** (11–9) | Kahnle (3–1) | — | 47,265 | 78–56 | W2 |
| 136 | August 31 | @ Yankees | 3–4 (11) | Gearrin (1–2) | **Trivino** (4–6) | — | 44,462 | 78–57 | L1 |

September: 18–8 (Home: 9–3; Away: 9–5)

| # | Date | Opponent | Score | Win | Loss | Save | Attendance | Record | Streak |
|---|---|---|---|---|---|---|---|---|---|
| 137 | September 1 | @ Yankees | 4–5 | Ottavino (6–4) | **Hendriks** (4–2) | — | 42,860 | 78–58 | L2 |
| 138 | September 3 | Angels | 7–5 | **Petit** (5–3) | Ramirez (4–3) | **Hendriks** (18) | 14,031 | 79–58 | W1 |
| 139 | September 4 | Angels | 4–0 | **Roark** (9–8) | Sandoval (0–2) | — | 12,597 | 80–58 | W2 |
| 140 | September 5 | Angels | 10–6 | **Puk** (1–0) | Buttrey (6–7) | — | 14,013 | 81–58 | W3 |
| 48 | September 6 | @ Tigers ^{[a]} | 7–3 | **Fiers** (14–3) | Reininger (0–2) | — | 15,680 | 82–58 | W4 |
| 141 | September 6 | Tigers | 4–5 (11) | Schreiber (1–0) | **Blackburn** (0–2) | Jiménez (6) | 16,080 | 82–59 | L1 |
| 142 | September 7 | Tigers | 10–2 | **Bassitt** (10–5) | Zimmermann (1–10) | — | 32,623 | 83–59 | W1 |
| 143 | September 8 | Tigers | 3–1 | **Manaea** (1–0) | Norris (3–12) | **Hendriks** (19) | 24,550 | 84–59 | W2 |
| 144 | September 9 | @ Astros | 0–15 | Greinke (15–5) | **Fiers** (14–4) | — | 38,289 | 84–60 | L1 |
| 145 | September 10 | @ Astros | 21–7 | **Roark** (10–8) | Miley (13–5) | **Mengden** (1) | 32,100 | 85–60 | W1 |
| 146 | September 11 | @ Astros | 5–3 | **Anderson** (12–9) | James (5–1) | **Hendriks** (20) | 32,938 | 86–60 | W2 |
| 147 | September 12 | @ Astros | 3–2 | **Bailey** (13–8) | Verlander (18–6) | **Hendriks** (21) | 34,024 | 87–60 | W3 |
| 148 | September 13 | @ Rangers | 14–9 | **Wendelken** (2–1) | Gibaut (1–1) | — | 27,813 | 88–60 | W4 |
| 149 | September 14 | @ Rangers | 8–6 | **Buchter** (1–1) | Minor (13–9) | **Hendriks** (22) | 31,928 | 89–60 | W5 |
| 150 | September 15 | @ Rangers | 6–1 | **Manaea** (2–0) | Hernández (1–1) | **Luzardo** (1) | 26,064 | 90–60 | W6 |
| 151 | September 16 | Royals | 5–6 | McCarthy (4–2) | **Hendriks** (4–3) | Kennedy (30) | 12,902 | 90–61 | L1 |
| 152 | September 17 | Royals | 2–1 | **Puk** (2–0) | López (4–8) | **Hendriks** (23) | 14,992 | 91–61 | W1 |
| 153 | September 18 | Royals | 1–0 (11) | **Wendelken** (3–1) | Hahn (0–1) | — | 16,714 | 92–61 | W2 |
| 154 | September 20 | Rangers | 8–0 | **Fiers** (15–4) | Minor (13–10) | — | 29,579 | 93–61 | W3 |
| 155 | September 21 | Rangers | 12–3 | **Manaea** (3–0) | Burke (0–2) | — | 29,896 | 94–61 | W4 |
| 156 | September 22 | Rangers | 3–8 | Lynn (15–11) | **Roark** (10–9) | — | 38,453 | 94–62 | L1 |
| 157 | September 24 | @ Angels | 2–3 | Peters (4–3) | **Bailey** (13–9) | Robles (23) | 34,505 | 94–63 | L2 |
| 158 | September 25 | @ Angels | 3–2 | **Soria** (2–4) | Robles (5–1) | **Hendriks** (24) | 36,865 | 95–63 | W1 |
| 159 | September 26 | @ Mariners | 3–1 | **Manaea** (4–0) | Hernández (1–8) | **Hendriks** (25) | 20,921 | 96–63 | W2 |
| 160 | September 27 | @ Mariners | 3–4 | Warren (1–0) | **Hendriks** (4–4) | — | 24,092 | 96–64 | L1 |
| 161 | September 28 | @ Mariners | 1–0 | **Anderson** (13–9) | Gonzales (16–13) | **Luzardo** (2) | 26,401 | 97–64 | W1 |
| 162 | September 29 | @ Mariners | 1–3 | McClain (1–1) | **Roark** (10–10) | Bass (5) | 16,851 | 97–65 | L1 |

Legend: = Win = Loss = Postponement
Bold = Athletics team member

Notes:

- **^{a}** The game was suspended due to rain in the bottom of seventh inning with the score 5–3 in favor of the Athletics. It was completed on September 6 prior to the regularly scheduled September 6 game in Oakland with the Tigers batting as the "home" team. The win in the completed game extended Oakland's winning streak they had established from May 16 through May 27.

== Player stats ==
=== Batting ===
Note: G = Games played; AB = At bats; R = Runs; H = Hits; 2B = Doubles; 3B = Triples; HR = Home runs; RBI = Runs batted in; SB = Stolen bases; BB = Walks; AVG = Batting average; SLG = Slugging average

| Player | G | AB | R | H | 2B | 3B | HR | RBI | SB | BB | AVG | SLG |
|---|---|---|---|---|---|---|---|---|---|---|---|---|
| Marcus Semien | 162 | 657 | 123 | 187 | 43 | 7 | 33 | 92 | 10 | 87 | .285 | .522 |
| Matt Chapman | 156 | 583 | 102 | 145 | 36 | 3 | 36 | 91 | 1 | 73 | .249 | .506 |
| Matt Olson | 127 | 483 | 73 | 129 | 26 | 0 | 36 | 91 | 0 | 51 | .267 | .545 |
| Khris Davis | 133 | 481 | 61 | 106 | 11 | 0 | 23 | 73 | 0 | 47 | .220 | .387 |
| Jurickson Profar | 139 | 459 | 65 | 100 | 24 | 2 | 20 | 67 | 9 | 48 | .218 | .410 |
| Ramón Laureano | 123 | 434 | 79 | 125 | 29 | 0 | 24 | 67 | 13 | 27 | .288 | .521 |
| Robbie Grossman | 138 | 420 | 57 | 101 | 21 | 3 | 6 | 38 | 9 | 59 | .240 | .348 |
| Mark Canha | 126 | 410 | 80 | 112 | 16 | 3 | 26 | 58 | 3 | 67 | .273 | .517 |
| Stephen Piscotty | 93 | 357 | 46 | 89 | 17 | 1 | 13 | 44 | 2 | 29 | .249 | .412 |
| Chad Pinder | 124 | 341 | 45 | 82 | 21 | 0 | 13 | 47 | 0 | 20 | .240 | .416 |
| Josh Phegley | 106 | 314 | 44 | 75 | 18 | 0 | 12 | 62 | 0 | 15 | .239 | .411 |
| Kendrys Morales | 34 | 108 | 9 | 22 | 1 | 1 | 1 | 7 | 0 | 14 | .204 | .259 |
| Chris Herrmann | 30 | 84 | 9 | 17 | 3 | 0 | 1 | 8 | 0 | 9 | .202 | .274 |
| Seth Brown | 26 | 75 | 11 | 22 | 8 | 2 | 0 | 13 | 1 | 7 | .293 | .453 |
| Nick Hundley | 31 | 70 | 5 | 14 | 3 | 1 | 2 | 5 | 0 | 2 | .200 | .357 |
| Franklin Barreto | 23 | 57 | 6 | 7 | 2 | 0 | 2 | 5 | 1 | 1 | .123 | .263 |
| Sheldon Neuse | 25 | 56 | 3 | 14 | 3 | 0 | 0 | 7 | 0 | 4 | .250 | .304 |
| Sean Murphy | 20 | 53 | 14 | 13 | 5 | 0 | 4 | 8 | 0 | 6 | .245 | .566 |
| Corban Joseph | 11 | 37 | 4 | 7 | 2 | 0 | 1 | 5 | 0 | 2 | .189 | .324 |
| Beau Taylor | 10 | 23 | 3 | 4 | 0 | 0 | 2 | 2 | 0 | 4 | .174 | .435 |
| Dustin Garneau | 7 | 17 | 3 | 5 | 2 | 0 | 1 | 7 | 0 | 2 | .294 | .588 |
| Nick Martini | 6 | 11 | 1 | 1 | 0 | 0 | 1 | 2 | 0 | 2 | .091 | .364 |
| Skye Bolt | 5 | 10 | 1 | 1 | 1 | 0 | 0 | 0 | 0 | 1 | .100 | .200 |
| Pitcher totals | 162 | 21 | 1 | 6 | 0 | 0 | 0 | 1 | 0 | 1 | .286 | .286 |
| Team totals | 162 | 5561 | 845 | 1384 | 292 | 23 | 257 | 800 | 49 | 578 | .249 | .448 |

=== Pitching ===
Note: W = Wins; L = Losses; ERA = Earned run average; G = Games pitched; GS = Games started; SV = Saves; IP = Innings pitched; H = Hits allowed; R = Runs allowed; ER = Earned runs allowed; BB = Walks allowed; SO = Strikeouts

| Player | W | L | ERA | G | GS | SV | IP | H | R | ER | BB | SO |
|---|---|---|---|---|---|---|---|---|---|---|---|---|
| Mike Fiers | 15 | 4 | 3.90 | 33 | 33 | 0 | 184.2 | 166 | 82 | 80 | 53 | 126 |
| Brett Anderson | 13 | 9 | 3.89 | 31 | 31 | 0 | 176.0 | 181 | 80 | 76 | 49 | 90 |
| Chris Bassitt | 10 | 5 | 3.81 | 28 | 25 | 0 | 144.0 | 125 | 66 | 61 | 47 | 141 |
| Frankie Montas | 9 | 2 | 2.63 | 16 | 16 | 0 | 96.0 | 84 | 35 | 28 | 23 | 103 |
| Liam Hendriks | 4 | 4 | 1.80 | 75 | 2 | 25 | 85.0 | 61 | 18 | 17 | 21 | 124 |
| Yusmeiro Petit | 5 | 3 | 2.71 | 80 | 0 | 0 | 83.0 | 57 | 25 | 25 | 10 | 71 |
| Homer Bailey | 6 | 3 | 4.30 | 13 | 13 | 0 | 73.1 | 73 | 35 | 35 | 15 | 68 |
| Joakim Soria | 2 | 4 | 4.30 | 71 | 1 | 1 | 69.0 | 51 | 33 | 33 | 20 | 79 |
| Lou Trivino | 4 | 6 | 5.25 | 61 | 0 | 0 | 60.0 | 61 | 40 | 35 | 31 | 57 |
| Daniel Mengden | 5 | 2 | 4.83 | 13 | 9 | 1 | 59.2 | 59 | 32 | 32 | 27 | 42 |
| Blake Treinen | 6 | 5 | 4.91 | 57 | 0 | 16 | 58.2 | 58 | 33 | 32 | 37 | 59 |
| Tanner Roark | 4 | 3 | 4.58 | 10 | 10 | 0 | 55.0 | 61 | 29 | 28 | 13 | 50 |
| Aaron Brooks | 2 | 3 | 5.01 | 15 | 6 | 0 | 50.1 | 49 | 29 | 28 | 14 | 43 |
| Ryan Buchter | 1 | 1 | 2.98 | 64 | 0 | 0 | 45.1 | 42 | 16 | 15 | 23 | 50 |
| J. B. Wendelken | 3 | 1 | 3.58 | 27 | 0 | 0 | 32.2 | 21 | 14 | 13 | 9 | 34 |
| Sean Manaea | 4 | 0 | 1.21 | 5 | 5 | 0 | 29.2 | 16 | 4 | 4 | 7 | 30 |
| Wei-Chung Wang | 1 | 0 | 3.33 | 20 | 0 | 0 | 27.0 | 22 | 10 | 10 | 11 | 16 |
| Marco Estrada | 0 | 2 | 6.85 | 5 | 5 | 0 | 23.2 | 23 | 19 | 18 | 8 | 11 |
| Tanner Anderson | 0 | 3 | 6.04 | 5 | 5 | 0 | 22.1 | 30 | 16 | 15 | 7 | 18 |
| Jake Diekman | 1 | 1 | 4.43 | 28 | 0 | 0 | 20.1 | 16 | 11 | 10 | 16 | 21 |
| Fernando Rodney | 0 | 2 | 9.42 | 17 | 0 | 0 | 14.1 | 20 | 15 | 15 | 12 | 14 |
| Jesús Luzardo | 0 | 0 | 1.50 | 6 | 0 | 2 | 12.0 | 5 | 2 | 2 | 3 | 16 |
| A. J. Puk | 2 | 0 | 3.18 | 10 | 0 | 0 | 11.1 | 10 | 4 | 4 | 5 | 13 |
| Paul Blackburn | 0 | 2 | 10.64 | 4 | 1 | 0 | 11.0 | 19 | 14 | 13 | 4 | 8 |
| Brian Schlitter | 0 | 0 | 3.72 | 6 | 0 | 0 | 9.2 | 12 | 4 | 4 | 4 | 6 |
| Ryan Dull | 0 | 0 | 12.00 | 7 | 0 | 0 | 9.0 | 19 | 13 | 12 | 4 | 8 |
| Kendrys Morales | 0 | 0 | 9.00 | 1 | 0 | 0 | 1.0 | 1 | 1 | 1 | 2 | 0 |
| Nick Martini | 0 | 0 | 0.00 | 1 | 0 | 0 | 1.0 | 0 | 0 | 0 | 2 | 1 |
| Team totals | 97 | 65 | 3.97 | 162 | 162 | 45 | 1465.0 | 1342 | 680 | 646 | 477 | 1299 |

== Postseason ==
=== Postseason game log ===
2019 Postseason Game Log: 0–1
American League Wild Card Game: 0–1

| Date | Opponent | Score | Win | Loss | Save | Stadium | Attendance | Series | Recap |
|---|---|---|---|---|---|---|---|---|---|
| October 2 | Rays | 1–5 | Morton (1–0) | Manaea (0–1) | — | RingCentral Coliseum | 54,005 | 0–1 | L1 |

=== Postseason rosters ===
Playoff rosters
American League Wild Card Game

- Pitchers: 16 Liam Hendriks 31 A. J. Puk 35 Jake Diekman 36 Yusmeiro Petit 40 Chris Bassitt 44 Jesús Luzardo 48 Joakim Soria 50 Mike Fiers 52 Ryan Buchter 55 Sean Manaea 57 J. B. Wendelken
- Catchers: 12 Sean Murphy 19 Josh Phegley
- Infielders: 1 Franklin Barreto 10 Marcus Semien 18 Chad Pinder 23 Jurickson Profar 26 Matt Chapman 28 Matt Olson 64 Sheldon Neuse
- Outfielders: 8 Robbie Grossman 20 Mark Canha 22 Ramón Laureano 65 Seth Brown
- Designated hitters: 2 Khris Davis

== Roster ==
2019 Oakland Athletics
Roster
| Pitchers: 30 Brett Anderson; 53 Tanner Anderson; 15 Homer Bailey; 40 Chris Bassitt; 58 Paul Blackburn; 35 Aaron Brooks; 52 Ryan Buchter; 35 Jake Diekman; 66 Ryan Dull; 21 Marco Estrada; 50 Mike Fiers; 16 Liam Hendriks; 44 Jesús Luzardo; 55 Sean Manaea; 33 Daniel Mengden; 47 Frankie Montas; 36 Yusmeiro Petit; 31 A. J. Puk; 60 Tanner Roark; 56 Fernando Rodney; 54 Brian Schlitter; 48 Joakim Soria; 39 Blake Treinen; 62 Lou Trivino; 61 Wei-Chung Wang; 57 J. B. Wendelken | Catchers: 3 Dustin Garneau; 5 Chris Herrmann; 3 Nick Hundley; 12 Sean Murphy; 19 Josh Phegley; 46 Beau Taylor; Infielders: 1 Franklin Barreto; 26 Matt Chapman; 56 Corban Joseph; 12 Kendrys Morales; 64 Sheldon Neuse; 28 Matt Olson; 23 Jurickson Profar; 10 Marcus Semien | Outfielders: 49 Skye Bolt; 65 Seth Brown; 20 Mark Canha; 2 Khris Davis; 6 Robbie Grossman; 22 Ramón Laureano; 38 Nick Martini; 18 Chad Pinder; 25 Stephen Piscotty | Manager: 6 Bob Melvin; Coaches: 17 Mike Aldrete (assistant hitting); 51 Darren Bush (hitting); 29 Ryan Christenson (bench); 90 Jeremy Dowdy (bullpen catcher); 14 Scott Emerson (pitching); 59 Marcus Jensen (bullpen/catching); 7 Mark Kotsay (quality control); 41 Al Pedrique (first base); 88 Philip Pohl (bullpen catcher); 4 Matt Williams (third base) |

== Farm system ==
| Level | Team | League | Manager |
|---|---|---|---|
| AAA | Las Vegas Aviators | Pacific Coast League | |
| AA | Midland RockHounds | Texas League | |
| A-Advanced | Stockton Ports | California League | |
| A | Beloit Snappers | Midwest League | |
| A-Short Season | Vermont Lake Monsters | New York–Penn League | |
| Rookie | AZL Athletics | Arizona League | |
| Rookie | DSL Athletics | Dominican Summer League | |
