= 2019 American League Division Series =

Teams
Team (Wins)		Manager	Season
Houston Astros (3)		A. J. Hinch	107–55 (.660), GA: 10
Tampa Bay Rays (2)		Kevin Cash	96–66 (.593), GB: 7
- Dates: October 4–10
- Television: FS1 (Games 1–2, 4–5); MLB Network (Game 3)
- TV announcers: Kenny Albert, Joe Girardi, A. J. Pierzynski and Jon Paul Morosi (FS1); Bob Costas, Joe Girardi, Jim Kaat and Tom Verducci (MLBN)
- Radio: ESPN
- Radio announcers: Dave Flemming and Jim Bowden
- Umpires: Bruce Dreckman, James Hoye, Jerry Meals, D. J. Reyburn, John Tumpane, Mark Wegner (crew chief)

Teams
Team (Wins)		Manager	Season
New York Yankees (3)		Aaron Boone	103–59 (.636), GA: 7
Minnesota Twins (0)		Rocco Baldelli	101–61 (.623), GA: 8
- Dates: October 4–7
- Television: MLB Network (Game 1); FS1 (Games 2–3)
- TV announcers: Bob Costas (Game 1), Joe Davis (Games 2–3), John Smoltz, Tom Verducci (Games 1, 3), and Ken Rosenthal (Games 2–3)
- Radio: ESPN
- Radio announcers: Dan Shulman and Chris Singleton
- Umpires: Lance Barksdale, Gary Cederstrom (crew chief), Eric Cooper, Manny Gonzalez, Adrian Johnson, Todd Tichenor
- ALWC: Tampa Bay Rays defeated Oakland Athletics, 5–1

The 2019 American League Division Series were two best-of-five playoff series in Major League Baseball's (MLB) 2019 postseason to determine the participating teams of the 2019 American League Championship Series. The three divisional winners, seeded first through third, and a fourth team—determined by the AL Wild Card Game—played in two series. These matchups were:

- (1) Houston Astros (AL West champions) vs. (5) Tampa Bay Rays (Wild Card Game winner): Astros won the series, 3–2.
- (2) New York Yankees (AL East champions) vs. (3) Minnesota Twins (AL Central champions): Yankees won the series, 3–0.

The team with the better regular season record (higher-seed) of each series hosted Games 1, 2, and (if necessary) 5, while the other team hosted Game 3 and (if necessary) 4.

For the third straight year, Major League Baseball sold presenting sponsorships to all of its postseason series. This ALDS was sponsored by Doosan and officially known as the 2019 American League Division Series presented by Doosan. The Yankees and Astros won their series to advance to the American League Championship Series.

The Astros defeated the Yankees in the ALCS, then lost the 2019 World Series to the National League champion Washington Nationals.

== Background ==
Seeds 1–3 were determined by regular season winning percentages among division-winning teams, having locked in as of the completion of games of September 27. The final seed was the winner of the American League Wild Card Game.

The Houston Astros, the American League West champion, 1 seed in AL, and had the best record, giving them home-field advantage throughout the playoffs, had home advantage against the fifth-seeded Tampa Bay Rays, who defeated the Oakland Athletics in the Wild Card Game. In the regular season, Tampa Bay won the season series against Houston 4–3, with three of their four wins coming at home to open the season.

The New York Yankees, winner of the American League East and 2 seed, had home advantage against the Minnesota Twins, the American League Central champions and 3 seed. The Yankees won four of six games against the Twins in the regular season. In a three-game series in Minneapolis in July, the teams combined for 57 total runs and 20 home runs.

The Yankees and Astros both appeared in the ALDS the prior season, while the Twins made their first ALDS appearance since 2010, and the Rays made their first ALDS appearance since 2013. Overall, this was the Yankees' 21st ALDS appearance, the Twins' seventh, the Rays' fifth, and the fourth for the Astros (who had seven NLDS appearances during their time in the National League). This was the second straight year the ALDS featured three 100-win teams.

== Matchups ==
=== Houston Astros vs. Tampa Bay Rays ===
Houston won the series, 3–2.

Game	Date	Score	Location	Time	Attendance
1	October 4	Tampa Bay Rays – 2, Houston Astros – 6	Minute Maid Park	3:24	43,360
2	October 5	Tampa Bay Rays – 1, Houston Astros – 3	Minute Maid Park	3:46	43,378
3	October 7	Houston Astros – 3, Tampa Bay Rays – 10	Tropicana Field	3:37	32,251
4	October 8	Houston Astros – 1, Tampa Bay Rays – 4	Tropicana Field	3:49	32,178
5	October 10	Tampa Bay Rays – 1, Houston Astros – 6	Minute Maid Park	3:12	43,418

=== New York Yankees vs. Minnesota Twins ===
New York won the series, 3–0.

Game	Date	Score	Location	Time	Attendance
1	October 4	Minnesota Twins – 4, New York Yankees – 10	Yankee Stadium	4:15	49,233
2	October 5	Minnesota Twins – 2, New York Yankees – 8	Yankee Stadium	3:34	49,277
3	October 7	New York Yankees – 5, Minnesota Twins – 1	Target Field	4:02	41,121

== Houston vs. Tampa Bay ==
This was the first time that the Astros and Rays had met in the postseason.

=== Game 1 ===
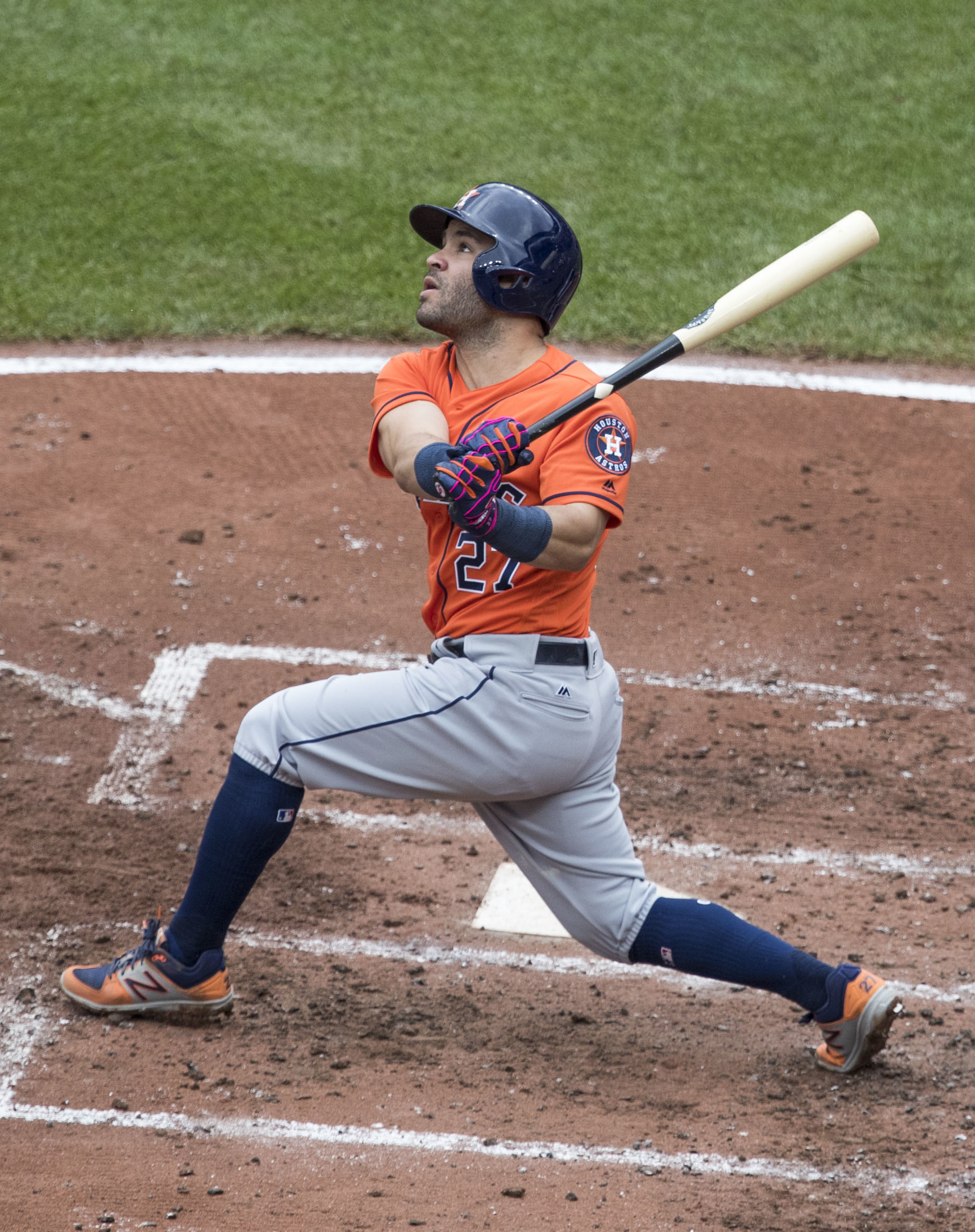
Jose Altuve hit the only home run of Game 1

Friday, October 4, 2019 1:05 pm (CDT) at Minute Maid Park in Houston, Texas, 73 °F (23 °C), roof closed
Team	1	2	3	4	5	6	7	8	9	R	H	E
Tampa Bay	0	0	0	0	0	0	0	2	0	2	5	1
Houston	0	0	0	0	4	0	2	0	X	6	9	0
WP: Justin Verlander (1–0) LP: Tyler Glasnow (0–1); Home runs: TB: None; HOU: Jose Altuve (1); Attendance: 43,360; Boxscore

Justin Verlander and Tyler Glasnow traded scoreless frames for the first four innings before Jose Altuve broke the tie with a two-run home run in the bottom of the fifth inning. It was Altuve's fifth home run in an ALDS Game 1 in the last three seasons. He hit three in Game 1 of the 2017 ALDS and one in Game 1 of the 2018 ALDS. Two more runs would score in the inning on a dropped pop-up error on Rays' second baseman Brandon Lowe. Verlander would keep the Rays bats silent for the next two innings, striking out the side in the top of the seventh to put the finishing touches on seven innings of one-hit baseball with eight strikeouts. The Astros would tack on two more runs in the bottom of the seventh on back-to-back doubles by Yordan Alvarez and Yuli Gurriel. Ryan Pressly would relieve Verlander in the eighth but would surrender two runs on consecutive hits by Eric Sogard and Austin Meadows before Will Harris got Ji-man Choi to ground out to end the inning. Roberto Osuna pitched a perfect ninth inning to seal the Game 1 win for Houston.

=== Game 2 ===
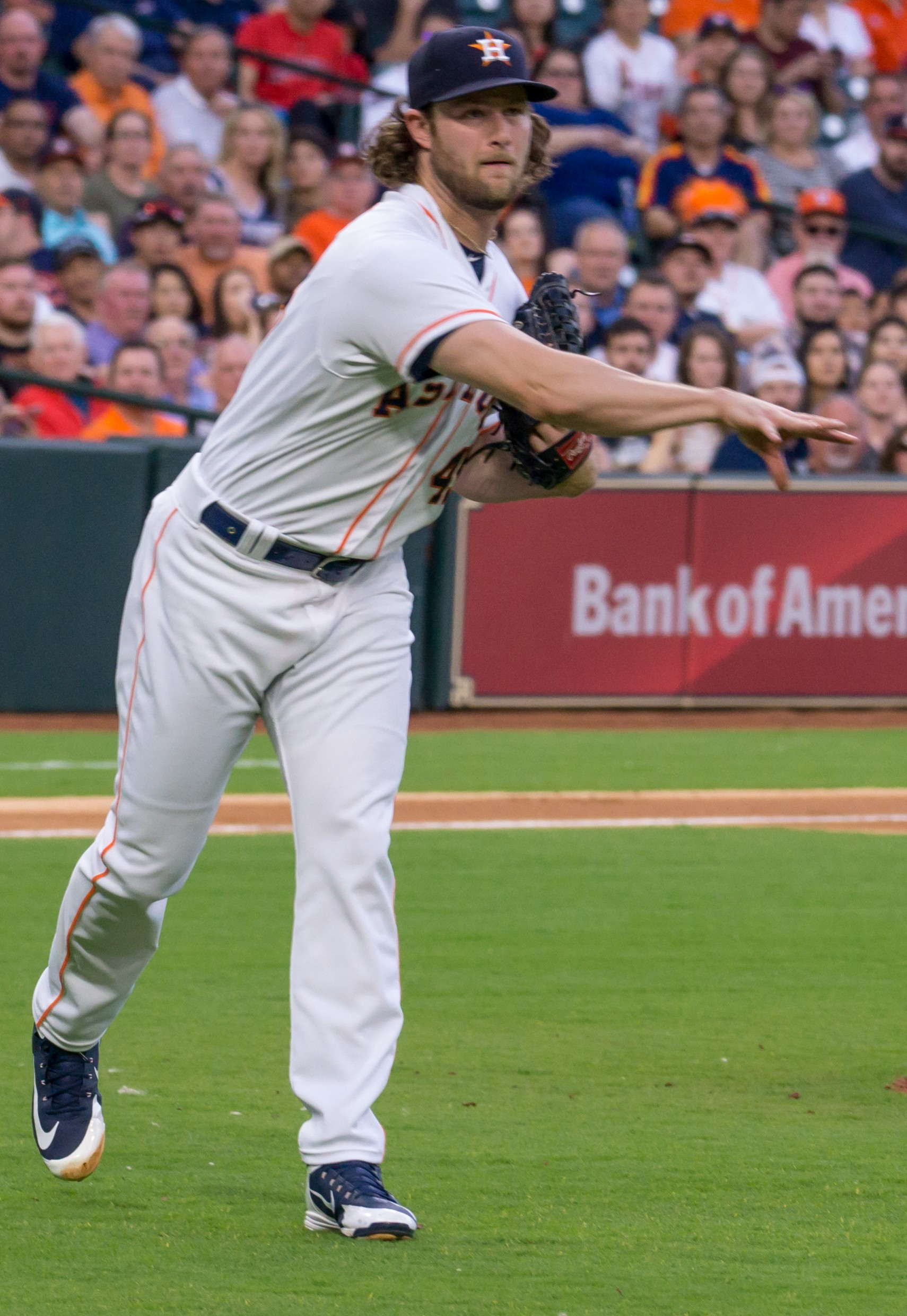
Gerrit Cole struck out 15 batters in Game 2.

Saturday, October 5, 2019 8:07 pm (CDT) at Minute Maid Park in Houston, Texas, 73 °F (23 °C), roof closed
Team	1	2	3	4	5	6	7	8	9	R	H	E
Tampa Bay	0	0	0	0	0	0	0	0	1	1	6	1
Houston	0	0	0	1	0	0	1	1	X	3	10	0
WP: Gerrit Cole (1–0) LP: Blake Snell (0–1) Sv: Will Harris (1); Home runs: TB: None; HOU: Alex Bregman (1); Attendance: 43,378; Boxscore

Gerrit Cole and Blake Snell, like Justin Verlander and Tyler Glasnow in Game 1, traded scoreless innings for the first three innings before Alex Bregman broke the tie with a solo home run in the bottom of the fourth inning. Cole kept the Rays bats silent for 7 2/3 innings and struck out 15 batters, the most in a postseason game since Roger Clemens in the 2000 ALCS. Meanwhile, the Astros tacked on another run in the seventh inning on a bloop single from Martín Maldonado and then scored their final run on a Carlos Correa single. Roberto Osuna relieved Gerrit Cole with two outs in the eighth and retired Yandy Díaz. Osuna started the ninth inning and ran into trouble immediately. He gave up back to back singles to Austin Meadows and Tommy Pham to start the inning and walked Ji-man Choi to load the bases. Osuna got Avisaíl García to ground into a forceout that scored Meadows from third. He then walked Brandon Lowe to load the bases again and was subsequently relieved by Will Harris with one out in the ninth inning. Harris then retired Travis d'Arnaud and Kevin Kiermaier to end the game and seal the Game 2 victory for Houston.

=== Game 3 ===
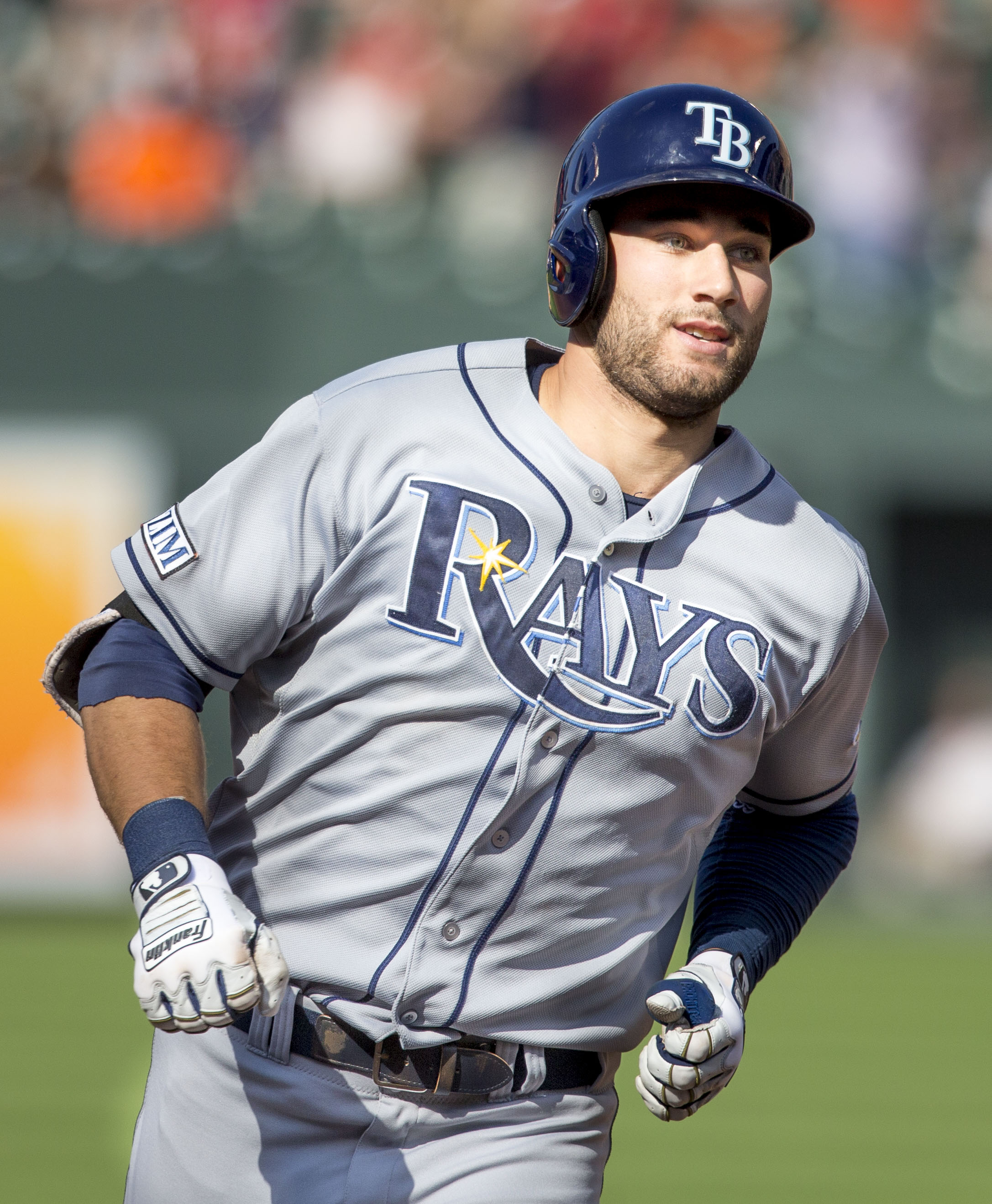
Kevin Kiermaier hit a three-run home run in Game 3

Monday, October 7, 2019 1:05 pm (EDT) at Tropicana Field in St. Petersburg, Florida, 72 °F (22 °C), dome
Team	1	2	3	4	5	6	7	8	9	R	H	E
Houston	1	0	0	0	0	2	0	0	0	3	7	1
Tampa Bay	0	3	1	4	0	1	1	0	X	10	12	1
WP: Charlie Morton (1–0) LP: Zack Greinke (0–1); Home runs: HOU: Jose Altuve (2); TB: Kevin Kiermaier (1), Ji-man Choi (1), Brandon Lowe (1), Willy Adames (1); Attendance: 32,251; Boxscore

Zack Greinke was given the ball to try and help the Astros sweep the Rays. Charlie Morton was his mound opponent. The Astros got to work early on Morton, with Jose Altuve hitting a solo homer to get the Astros on the board. Greinke retired the Rays in order to begin his outing, but in the second inning, it went sour for Greinke. He retired Ji-man Choi to start the second, allowed a single to Avisaíl García, got Brandon Lowe to ground out, hit Travis d'Arnaud with a pitch and Kevin Kiermaier hit a three-run home run that gave the Rays their first lead in the series. Morton settled into his outing after the first, throwing five innings of one-run baseball. Meanwhile, the Rays kept scoring runs, adding a run in the third inning with a Choi home run, and they broke the game in the 4th inning, getting a home run from Lowe, an Austin Meadows two-run double and a Tommy Pham single to put the Rays up 8–1 and chased Greinke from the game. The Astros would chip away at the deficit with a Yuli Gurriel two-run single that made it 8–3. That would end the scoring for the Astros. Meanwhile, the Rays added to their lead, with a Willy Adames solo home run and a d'Arnaud sacrifice fly to capped the scoring for the Rays. Colin Poche retired the Astros in order and allowed the Rays to play a Game 4.

=== Game 4 ===
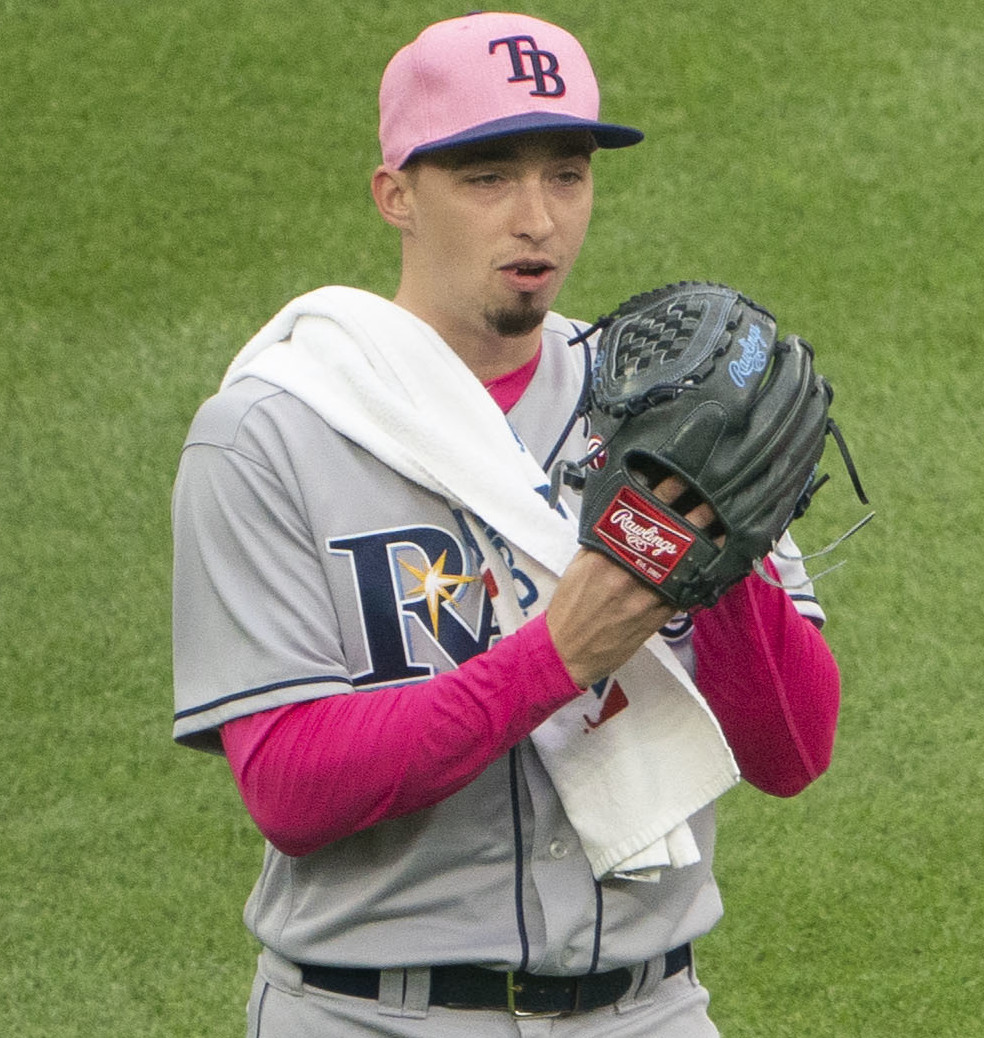
Game 2 starter Blake Snell earned a save in Game 4.

Tuesday, October 8, 2019 7:07 pm (EDT) at Tropicana Field in St. Petersburg, Florida, 72 °F (22 °C), dome
Team	1	2	3	4	5	6	7	8	9	R	H	E
Houston	0	0	0	0	0	0	0	1	0	1	6	0
Tampa Bay	3	0	0	1	0	0	0	0	X	4	13	0
WP: Ryan Yarbrough (1–0) LP: Justin Verlander (1–1) Sv: Blake Snell (1); Home runs: HOU: Robinson Chirinos (1); TB: Tommy Pham (1), Willy Adames (2); Attendance: 32,178; Boxscore

The Rays struck first against Justin Verlander who was pitching on three days rest. Tommy Pham hit a home run with Travis d'Arnaud and Joey Wendle adding RBI base hits all in the first inning. Willy Adames added another solo shot off Verlander, ending his night in the fourth. Robinson Chirinos spoiled the Rays' shutout with a home run of his own. With the tying run at the plate in the top of the ninth and one out, Blake Snell struck out Yordan Alvarez and induced a ground ball out from Yuli Gurriel to force the decisive Game 5.

=== Game 5 ===
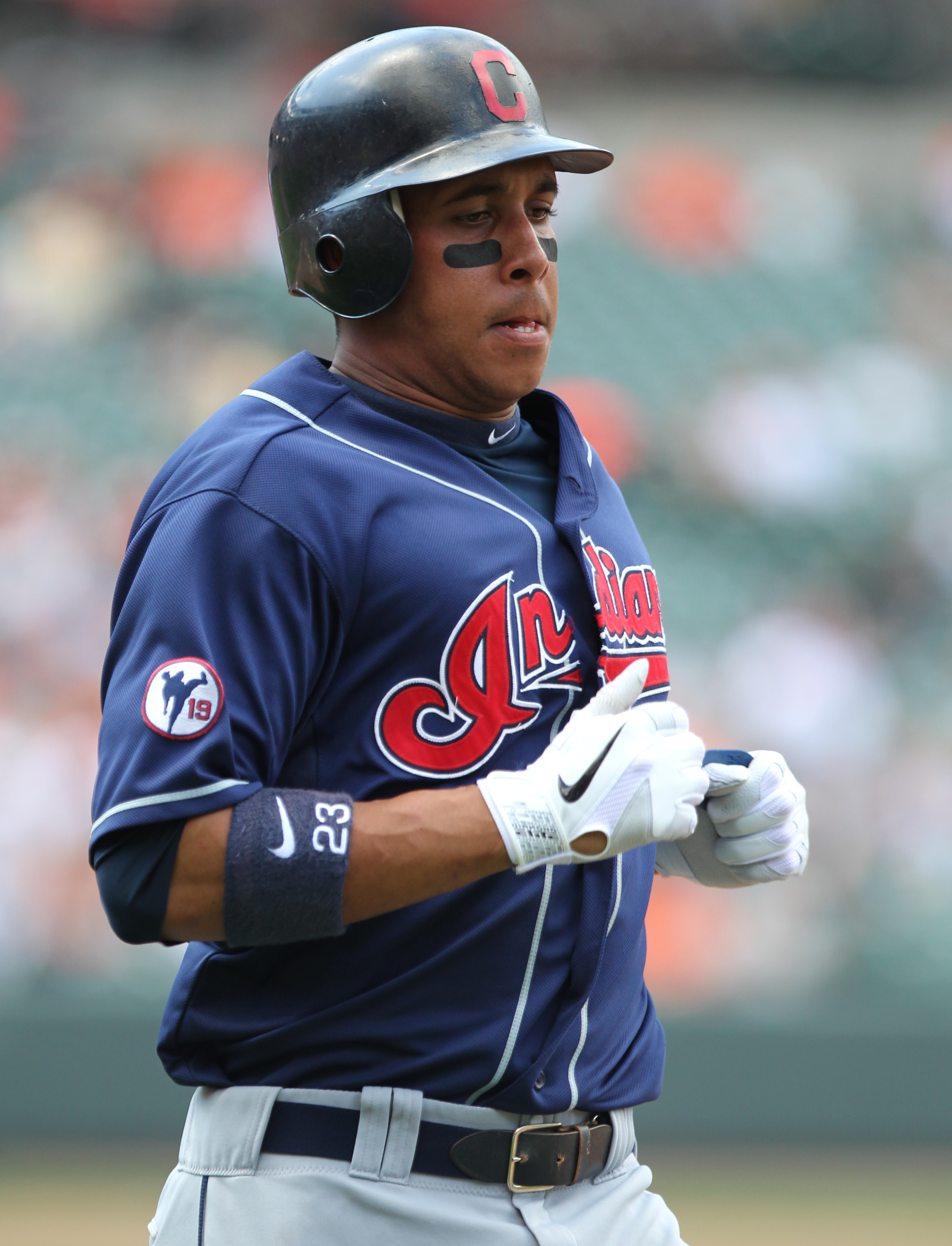
Michael Brantley was 2-for-3, including a home run, in Game 5.

Thursday, October 10, 2019 6:07 pm (CDT) at Minute Maid Park in Houston, Texas, 73 °F (23 °C), roof closed
Team	1	2	3	4	5	6	7	8	9	R	H	E
Tampa Bay	0	1	0	0	0	0	0	0	0	1	2	0
Houston	4	0	0	0	0	0	0	2	X	6	8	0
WP: Gerrit Cole (2–0) LP: Tyler Glasnow (0–2); Home runs: TB: Eric Sogard (1); HOU: Michael Brantley (1), Jose Altuve (3); Attendance: 43,418; Boxscore

With the series tied at two games apiece, this was the second ALDS Game 5 for both teams; Tampa Bay lost their prior Game 5 appearance in 2010, and Houston lost their Game 5 appearance in 2015. Houston had only one NLDS Game 5 appearance when they competed in the National League, a win in 2004. The Astros struck early on an RBI single by Altuve, a two-run double by Bregman, and an RBI single by Yuli Gurriel in the span of five batters. Eric Sogard would lead off the next inning with a solo home run and would be the final time the Rays had an extra base hit in the game. Cole would pitch eight innings while striking out ten. It was his 11th consecutive game with 10+ strikeouts including the regular season. Michael Brantley and Jose Altuve went back-to-back in the bottom of the 8th inning to bring the lead to 6–1. Altuve's home run was the 11th in his postseason career, the most by any second baseman in baseball history. Roberto Osuna came on to close out the game in the ninth, striking out Ji-man Choi swinging to end the series. The 6–1 win sent Houston on to the ALCS to face the New York Yankees. The Astros became the first team since the 2011–13 Detroit Tigers to appear in the ALCS in three consecutive seasons.

Combined with his Game 2 start, Cole struck out 25 hitters during the series, setting a new Major League Division Series record.

=== Composite line score ===
2019 ALDS (3–2): Houston Astros beat Tampa Bay Rays

Team	1	2	3	4	5	6	7	8	9	R	H	E
Tampa Bay Rays	3	4	1	5	0	1	1	2	1	18	38	3
Houston Astros	5	0	0	1	4	2	3	4	0	19	40	1
Total attendance: 194,585 Average attendance: 38,917

== New York vs. Minnesota ==
This was the sixth postseason match-up between Minnesota and New York. The previous five meetings were the 2003 ALDS, 2004 ALDS, 2009 ALDS, 2010 ALDS, and the 2017 AL Wild Card Game—with the Yankees winning each of those prior meetings. This was just the second time the ALDS featured a match-up of two 100-win teams, following the Boston Red Sox and Yankees meeting during the 2018 ALDS.

=== Game 1 ===
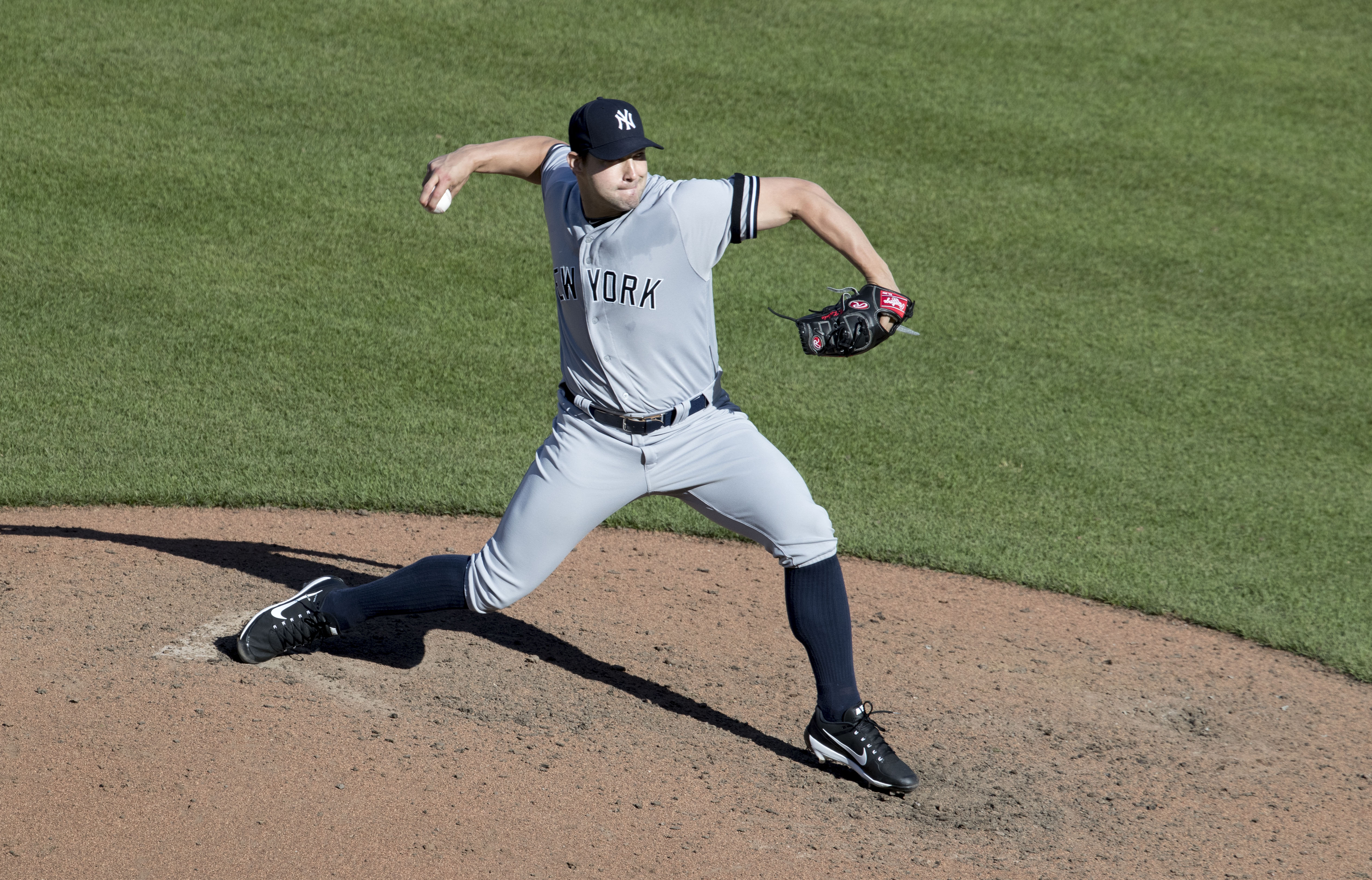
Game 1 winning pitcher Tommy Kahnle

Friday, October 4, 2019 7:07 pm (EDT) at Yankee Stadium in Bronx, New York, 58 °F (14 °C), cloudy
Team	1	2	3	4	5	6	7	8	9	R	H	E
Minnesota	1	0	1	0	1	1	0	0	0	4	7	1
New York	0	0	3	0	2	2	3	0	X	10	8	1
WP: Tommy Kahnle (1–0) LP: Zack Littell (0–1); Home runs: MIN: Jorge Polanco (1), Nelson Cruz (1), Miguel Sanó (1); NYY: DJ LeMahieu (1), Brett Gardner (1); Attendance: 49,233; Boxscore

This match-up featured two of the best home run hitting teams in major league baseball history. With 307 home runs by their hitters, the Twins set a new major league record for most home runs by a team in a season, edging out the Yankees, who hit 306 this season themselves.

With their loss to the Yankees in Game 1, the Twins took sole possession of the record for the longest postseason losing streak in MLB history, at 14 games.

=== Game 2 ===
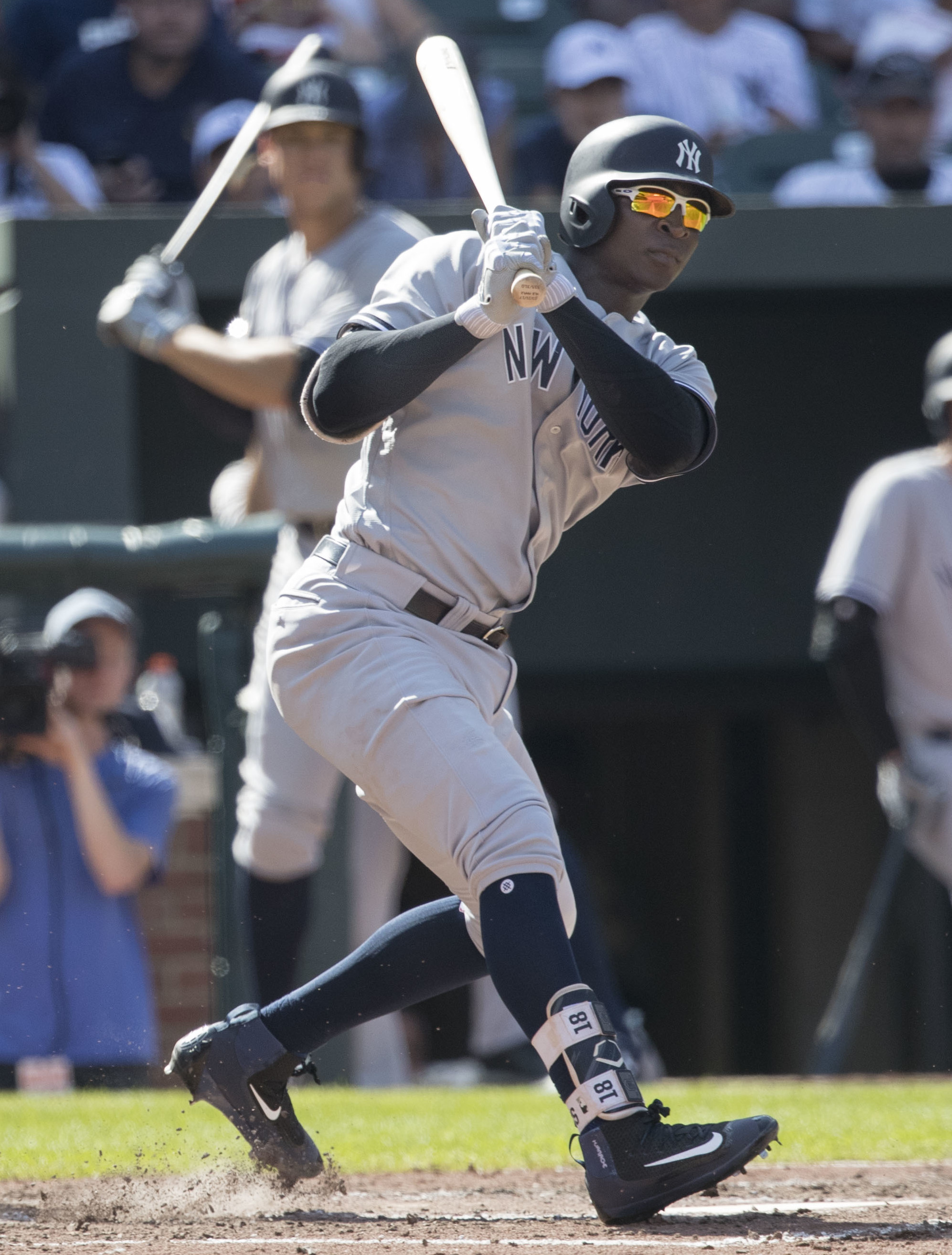
Didi Gregorius hit a grand slam in Game 2.

Saturday, October 5, 2019 5:07 pm (EDT) at Yankee Stadium in Bronx, New York, 59 °F (15 °C), clear
Team	1	2	3	4	5	6	7	8	9	R	H	E
Minnesota	0	0	0	1	0	0	0	0	1	2	6	0
New York	1	0	7	0	0	0	0	0	X	8	11	0
WP: Masahiro Tanaka (1–0) LP: Randy Dobnak (0–1); Home runs: MIN: None; NYY: Didi Gregorius (1); Attendance: 49,277; Boxscore

Randy Dobnak, making his postseason debut, allowed an opening double to DJ LeMahieu and a walk to Aaron Judge. He got Brett Gardner to fly out but gave up a single to Edwin Encarnación to give the Yankees a 1–0 lead. Things would go very wrong for the Twins in the bottom of the third, as Dobnak allowed a single to Judge, a walk to Gardner, a single to Encarnacion to load the bases and was relieved by Tyler Duffey. Giancarlo Stanton hit a sacrifice fly to give the Yankees a 2–0 lead. Duffey then gave a single to Gleyber Torres to make it 3–0 Yankees. Duffey proceeded to hit Gary Sánchez with a pitch to load the bases again and then gave up a grand slam to Didi Gregorius to blow the game open. Masahiro Tanaka went five innings and gave up one run. Jonathan Loáisiga gave up the second Twins run and struck out Miguel Sanó to end the game and send the Yankees to Minneapolis with a 2–0 series lead.

=== Game 3 ===
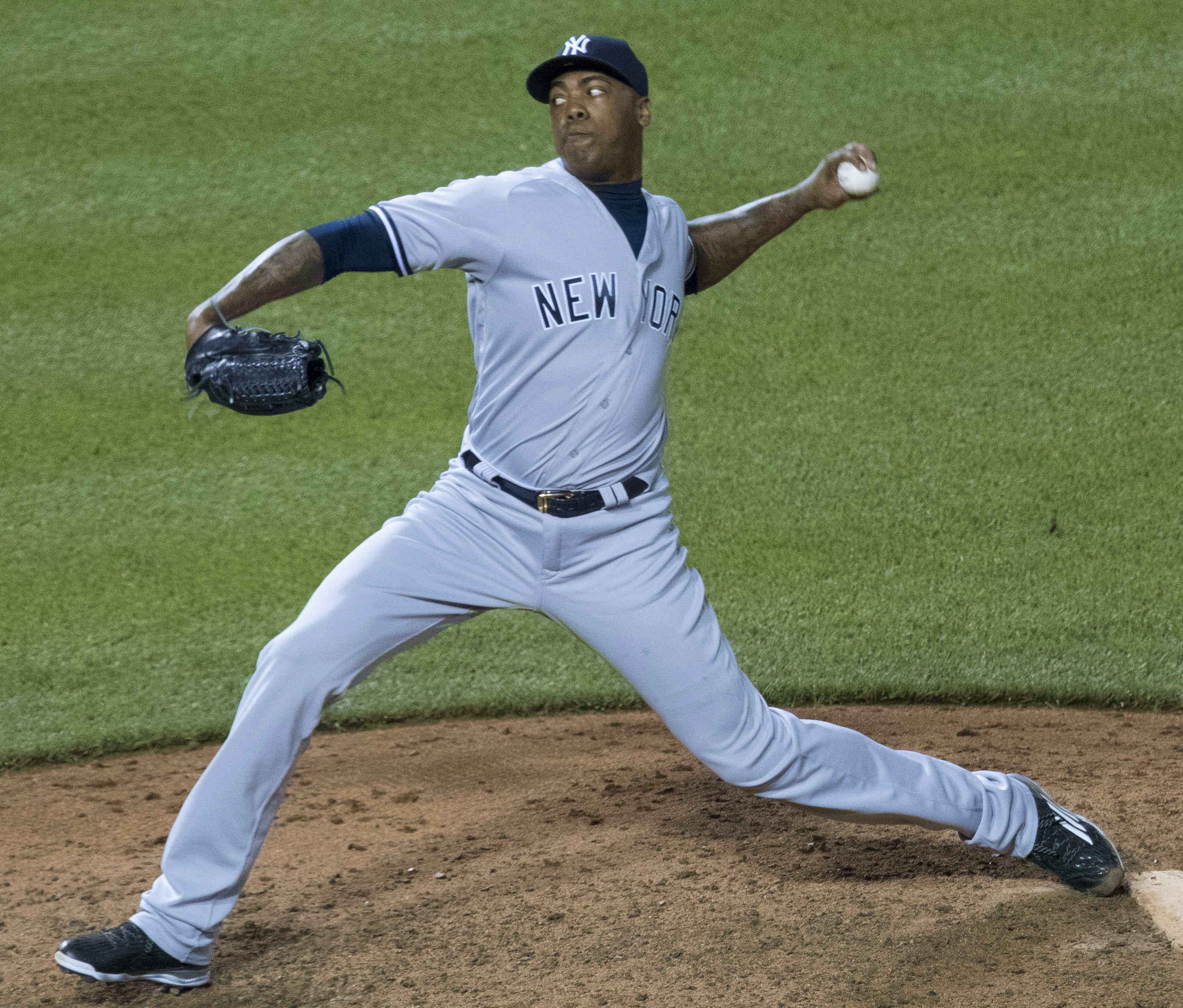
Aroldis Chapman earned a save in Game 3, as the Yankees advanced.

Monday, October 7, 2019 7:40 pm (CDT) at Target Field in Minneapolis, Minnesota, 62 °F (17 °C), clear
Team	1	2	3	4	5	6	7	8	9	R	H	E
New York	0	1	1	0	0	0	1	0	2	5	10	0
Minnesota	0	0	0	0	0	0	0	1	0	1	9	1
WP: Chad Green (1–0) LP: Jake Odorizzi (0–1) Sv: Aroldis Chapman (1); Home runs: NYY: Gleyber Torres (1), Cameron Maybin (1); MIN: Eddie Rosario (1); Attendance: 41,121; Boxscore

Gleyber Torres opened the scoring with a solo home run to left in the second, followed by a Brett Gardner single in the next frame which drove in Gio Urshela. Didi Gregorius continued to haunt the Twins with another RBI single, making the score 3–0 in the seventh. Eddie Rosario homered off Zach Britton to pull the Twins within two, but the Yankees added two insurance runs in the ninth on a Cameron Maybin homer and Gregorius scoring Torres on another hit. Luis Severino labored through four scoreless innings, getting out of a bases loaded no out jam in the second, before giving way to the bullpen. Aroldis Chapman, who entered in the eighth, got the save. Chapman was aided by Gregorius leaping to catch a Jorge Polanco line drive for the second out of the ninth before Nelson Cruz struck out looking to end the series and send the Yankees to their 17th ALCS. The loss gave Minnesota its 16th straight postseason defeat, 13 of those in games against the Yankees; and their 28th straight year without winning the title. The Twins became the first 100+ win team since the 1990 Oakland Athletics to be swept in the postseason.

=== Composite line score ===
2019 ALDS (3–0): New York Yankees beat Minnesota Twins

Team	1	2	3	4	5	6	7	8	9	R	H	E
Minnesota Twins	1	0	1	1	1	1	0	1	1	7	22	2
New York Yankees	1	1	11	0	2	2	4	0	2	23	29	1
Total attendance: 139,631 Average attendance: 46,544

== See also ==
- 2019 National League Division Series
