= 2019 American League Wild Card Game =

| | 1 | 2 | 3 | 4 | 5 | 6 | 7 | 8 | 9 | R | H | E |
|---|---|---|---|---|---|---|---|---|---|---|---|---|
| Tampa Bay Rays | 1 | 2 | 1 | 0 | 1 | 0 | 0 | 0 | 0 | 5 | 7 | 1 |
| Oakland Athletics | 0 | 0 | 1 | 0 | 0 | 0 | 0 | 0 | 0 | 1 | 8 | 0 |
- Date: October 2, 2019
- Venue: RingCentral Coliseum
- City: Oakland, California
- Managers: Kevin Cash (Tampa Bay Rays); Bob Melvin (Oakland Athletics)
- Umpires: HP: Chad Fairchild; 1B: Fieldin Culbreth; 2B: Bill Miller (crew chief); 3B: Chris Guccione; LF: Lance Barrett; RF: Adam Hamari
- Attendance: 54,005
- Ceremonial first pitch: MC Hammer
- Television: ESPN; ESPN2 (Statcast Edition)
- TV announcers: Matt Vasgersian, Jessica Mendoza, Alex Rodriguez, and Buster Olney (ESPN); Jason Benetti, Eduardo Pérez, and Mike Petriello (ESPN2)
- Radio: ESPN
- Radio announcers: Dan Shulman and Chris Singleton

The 2019 American League Wild Card Game was a playoff game during Major League Baseball's (MLB) 2019 postseason contested between the American League's two wild card teams, the Oakland Athletics and Tampa Bay Rays. It was played on October 2, with Tampa Bay advancing to the American League Division Series to face the Houston Astros.

The game was televised nationally by ESPN. An alternate telecast, featuring Statcast analytics and sponsored by Amazon Web Services, aired on ESPN2. The game set the record for the highest attendance at a wild card game with an attendance of 54,005. Tyler Glasnow of the visiting Rays later said that the raucous Oakland Coliseum was the loudest environment he had ever been in.

== Background ==
Oakland entered the game with a 97–65 record, while Tampa Bay was 96–66. They met seven times during the regular season, with Oakland winning the season series 4–3.

The Oakland Athletics secured their third postseason appearance as a wild card team on September 27, finishing second in the American League West, behind the Houston Astros. Oakland secured home field advantage on September 28. They previously appeared in the 2014 and 2018 Wild Card Games, losing both.

The Tampa Bay Rays also secured their third postseason appearance as a wild card team on September 27, finishing second in the American League East, behind the New York Yankees. They previously appeared in one Wild Card Game, a win in 2013.

== Game results ==
=== Line score ===
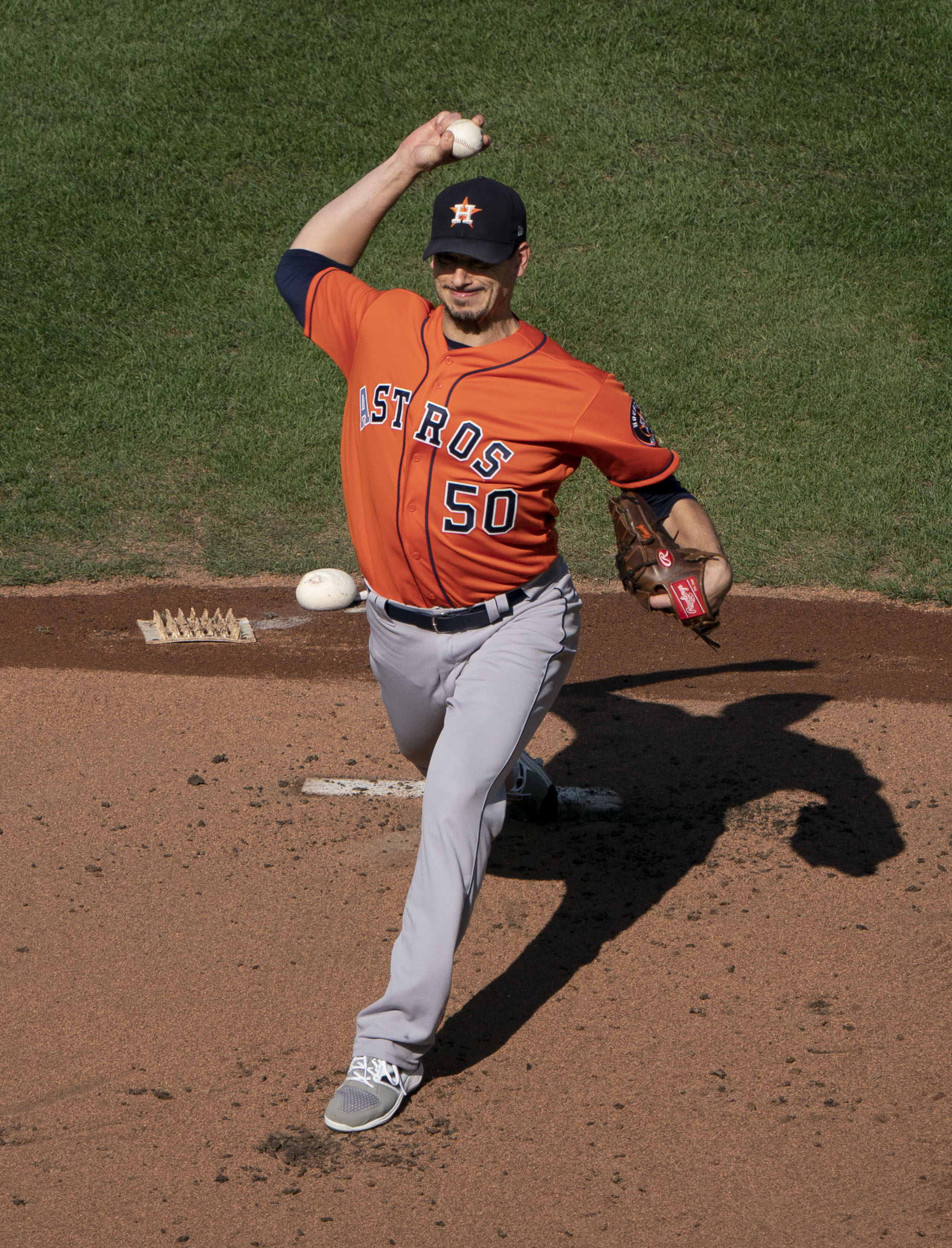
Winning pitcher Charlie Morton, with the 2018 Astros

Wednesday, October 2, 2019 5:09 pm (PDT) at RingCentral Coliseum in Oakland, California, 70 °F (21 °C), partly cloudy
| Team | 1 | 2 | 3 | 4 | 5 | 6 | 7 | 8 | 9 | R | H | E |
|---|---|---|---|---|---|---|---|---|---|---|---|---|
| Tampa Bay | 1 | 2 | 1 | 0 | 1 | 0 | 0 | 0 | 0 | 5 | 7 | 1 |
| Oakland | 0 | 0 | 1 | 0 | 0 | 0 | 0 | 0 | 0 | 1 | 8 | 0 |
WP: Charlie Morton (1–0) LP: Sean Manaea (0–1); Home runs: TB: Yandy Díaz 2 (2), Avisaíl García (1), Tommy Pham (1); OAK: None; Attendance: 54,005; Boxscore

The Rays took an early lead in the first inning courtesy of a leadoff home run by Yandy Díaz off Oakland starter Sean Manaea. Manaea gave up a single to Matt Duffy to begin the second inning, and Avisaíl García promptly homered to extend Tampa Bay's lead to 3–0. When Manaea gave up another home run to Díaz in the third inning, he was lifted in favor of Yusmeiro Petit. The Athletics scored their lone run of the game in the bottom of the third, when a throwing error by Mike Brosseau allowed Marcus Semien to reach third base and Ramón Laureano drove him in with a sacrifice fly. However, Tommy Pham's fifth inning home run off Petit again gave the Rays a four-run lead. Charlie Morton was relieved after the bottom of the fifth by Diego Castillo, Nick Anderson, and Emilio Pagán, who combined for four scoreless innings to seal the victory for Tampa Bay. For Oakland, it was their 30th straight year without a title. It was the ninth time from 2000 to 2019 that the Athletics competed in a winner-take-all postseason game, for which they lost all nine. This would be the final MLB playoff game in Oakland with fans in attendance as the Athletics would relocate after the 2024 season (while the Athletics did qualify for the 2020 postseason, all games that season were played without fans due to the COVID-19 pandemic).

== See also ==
- 2019 National League Wild Card Game
