= Tanner Anderson =

American baseball player (born 1993)

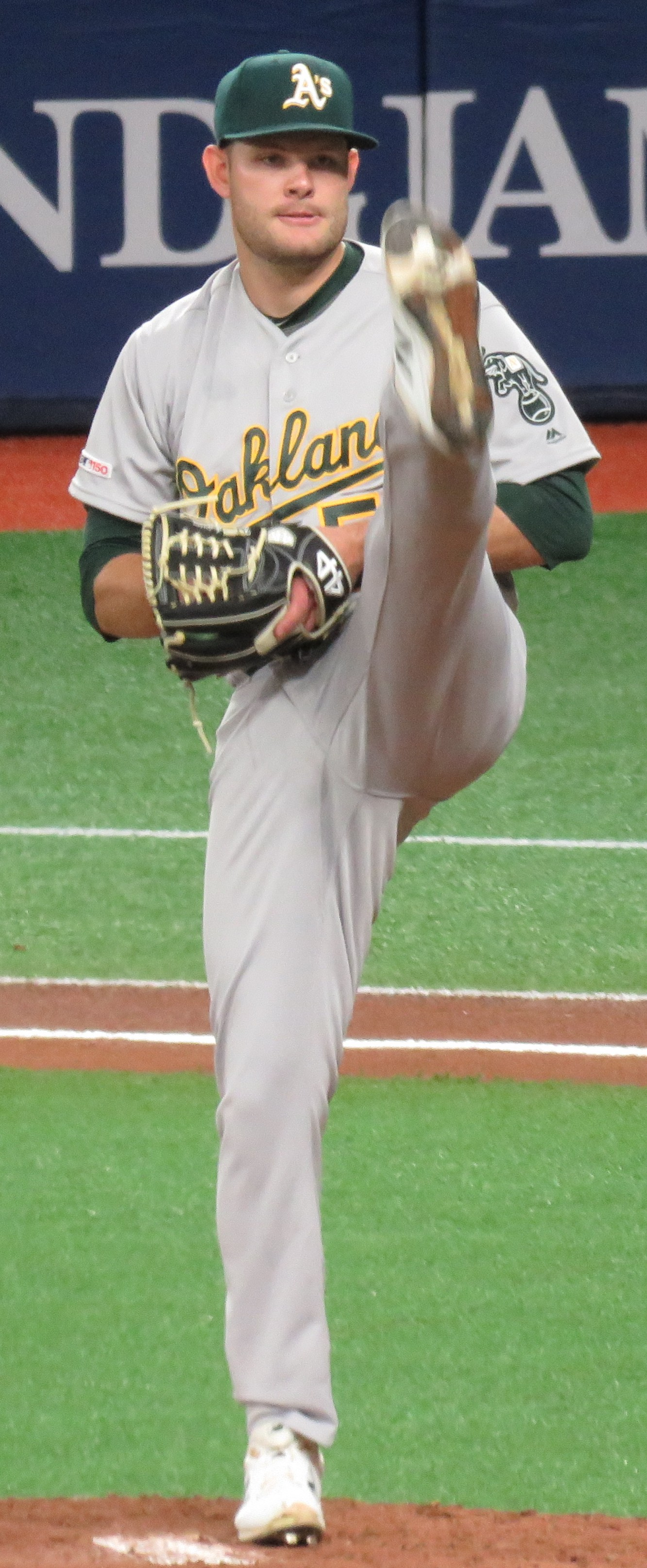
- Anderson with the Oakland Athletics in 2019
- Pitcher
- Born: May 27, 1993 (age 33); Boynton Beach, Florida, U.S.
- Batted: Right Threw: Right

Professional debut
- MLB: July 2, 2018, for the Pittsburgh Pirates
- CPBL: September 15, 2022, for the Fubon Guardians

Last appearance
- MLB: September 30, 2021, for the Pittsburgh Pirates
- CPBL: August 15, 2023, for the Fubon Guardians

MLB statistics
- Win–loss record: 1–3
- Earned run average: 5.82
- Strikeouts: 25

CPBL statistics
- Win–loss record: 4–2
- Earned run average: 2.82
- Strikeouts: 50
- Stats at Baseball Reference

Teams
- Pittsburgh Pirates (2018); Oakland Athletics (2019); Pittsburgh Pirates (2021); Fubon Guardians (2022–2023)

Tanner Ackley Anderson (born May 27, 1993) is an American former professional baseball pitcher. He played in Major League Baseball (MLB) for the Pittsburgh Pirates and Oakland Athletics, and in the Chinese Professional Baseball League (CPBL) for the Fubon Guardians.

== Early life and amateur career ==
Tyler Anderson's parents are Lee and Lisa Anderson. As a child, he played the violin. After graduating from Plant High School in Tampa, Florida, Anderson enrolled at Harvard University where he played college baseball for the Harvard Crimson. As a senior at Harvard he pitched to a 0–4 record with a 4.08 ERA in 13 games (six starts). He studied biomedical engineering before switching majors to history of science.

== Professional career ==
=== Pittsburgh Pirates ===
After his senior year, he was drafted by the Pittsburgh Pirates in the 20th round of the 2015 MLB draft, and he signed.

After signing, Anderson was assigned to the Bristol Pirates where he was 4–0 with a 2.38 ERA in 12 relief appearances. At the end of the season, he was promoted and pitched six relief innings for the West Virginia Black Bears in which he was 1–0 with a 4.50 ERA. In 2016, he pitched for the West Virginia Power and the Bradenton Marauders where he posted a combined 3–3 record and 3.58 ERA in 36 games pitched between both clubs. Anderson moved into the starting rotation for the Altoona Curve in 2017, going 10–8 with a 3.38 ERA in 30 games (19 starts). He began 2018 with the Indianapolis Indians.

Anderson was called up to the major leagues by the Pirates on June 27, 2018. In 24 relief appearances for Indianapolis prior to his promotion he was 1–1 with a 2.34 ERA.

=== Oakland Athletics ===
On November 20, 2018, Anderson was traded to the Oakland Athletics in exchange for a player to be named later, pitcher Wilkin Ramos. Anderson spent the majority of the 2019 season with the Triple-A Las Vegas Aviators. On September 1, 2019, Anderson was designated for assignment after recording an 0–3 record and 6.04 ERA in 5 major league games.

=== Sioux Falls Canaries ===
On August 26, 2020, Anderson signed with the Sioux Falls Canaries of the American Association. Anderson recorded a 1–2 record and 10.64 ERA in 4 appearances with the Canaries.

=== Oakland Athletics (second stint) ===
After the conclusion of the season on September 18, 2020, Anderson was returned to the Athletics organization. He began the 2021 season with Triple-A Las Vegas, pitching to a 3–0 record and 3.60 ERA in 12 appearances before being released on June 17, 2021.

=== Pittsburgh Pirates (second stint) ===
On July 5, 2021, Anderson signed a minor league contract with the Pittsburgh Pirates organization. On September 30, Anderson was selected to the 40-man roster. Anderson made a single appearance for the Pirates, yielding two earned runs in five innings, and recording one strikeout. Anderson was released following the season on November 16.

=== Toros de Tijuana ===
On February 23, 2022, Anderson signed with the Toros de Tijuana of the Mexican League. In 9 starts, he posted a 2–5 record with a 3.78 ERA and 25 strikeouts in 47 2/3 innings. Anderson was waived on June 20, 2022.

=== Bravos de León ===
On June 21, 2022, Anderson was claimed off waivers by the Bravos de León of the Mexican League. He did not appear in a game with León.

=== Fubon Guardians ===
On June 28, 2022, Anderson had his contract purchased by the Fubon Guardians of the Chinese Professional Baseball League. In 6 starts, he posted a 1.72 ERA with 11 strikeouts in 31 1/3 innings pitched.

Anderson pitched in 16 games (9 starts) for the Guardians in 2023, recording a 3.38 ERA with 39 strikeouts in 61 1/3 innings of work. On August 16, 2023, Anderson requested and was granted his release.

=== Sultanes de Monterrey ===
On March 1, 2024, Anderson signed with the Sultanes de Monterrey of the Mexican League. In 18 starts for Monterrey, he posted a 6–4 record and 5.58 ERA with 63 strikeouts across 90 1/3 innings pitched. Anderson was released by the Sultanes on April 15, 2025, prior to the start of the season.
