= Seth Brown (baseball) =

American baseball player (born 1992)

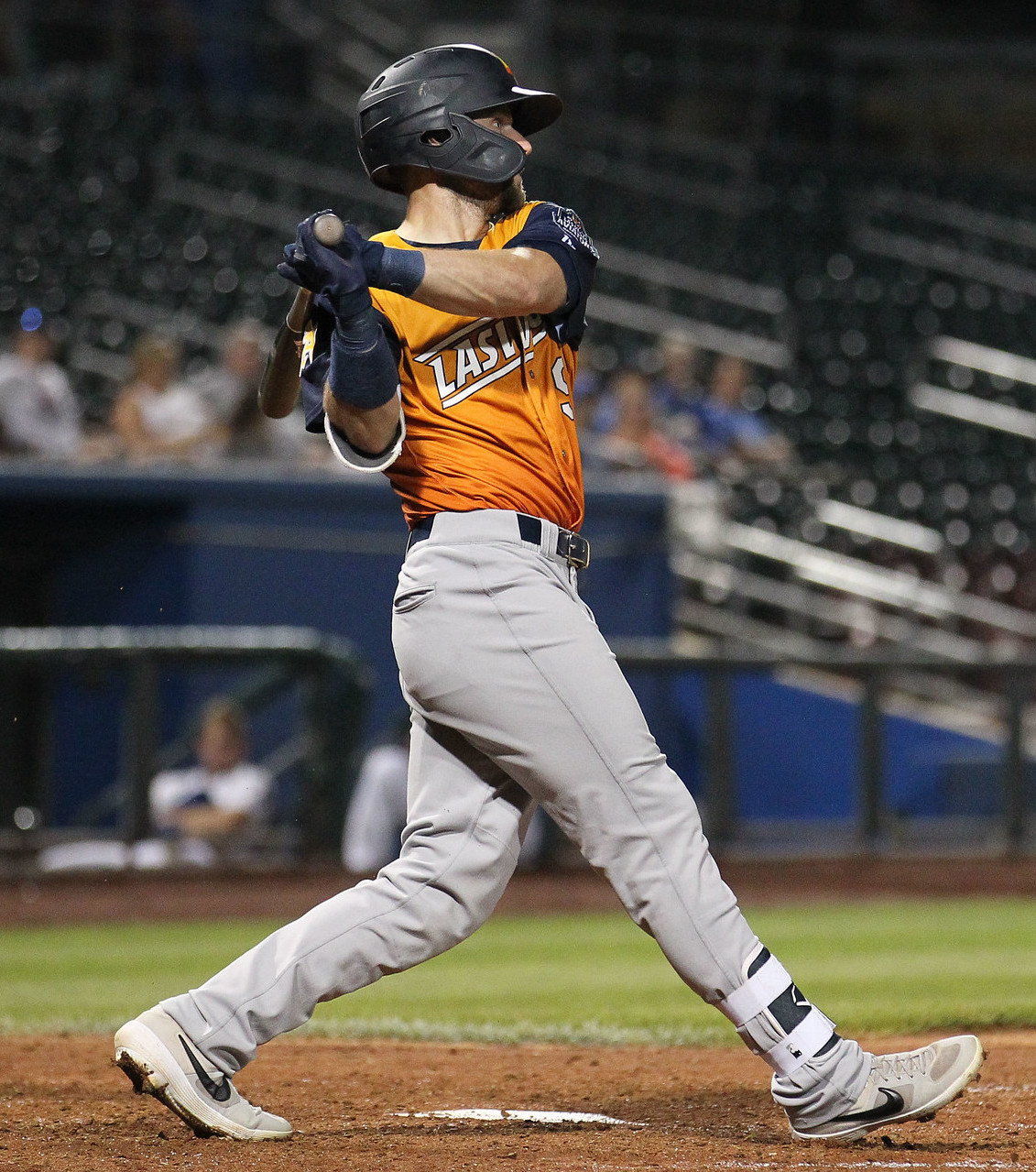
- Brown with the Las Vegas Aviators in 2019

Free agent
- Outfielder / First baseman
- Born: July 13, 1992 (age 34); Klamath Falls, Oregon, U.S.
- Bats: Left Throws: Left

MLB debut
- August 26, 2019, for the Oakland Athletics

MLB statistics (through 2025 season)
- Batting average: .226
- Home runs: 74
- Runs batted in: 233
- Stats at Baseball Reference

Teams
- Oakland Athletics / Athletics (2019–2025)

Seth William Brown (born July 13, 1992) is an American professional baseball outfielder and first baseman who is a free agent. He has previously played in Major League Baseball (MLB) for the Oakland Athletics / Athletics. He made his MLB debut in 2019.

== Early life and amateur career ==
Brown was born in and grew up in Klamath Falls, Oregon, and initially attended Klamath Union High School. His family moved to Medford, Oregon, going into his senior year in order to shorten his mother's commute to work. Following the move, Brown attended North Medford High School and was named first team All-Southwest Conference and second team OSAA Class 6A All-State as a senior. Both at North Medford and for the Medford Mustangs in American Legion, Brown was a teammate of Major League pitcher Braden Shipley.

Brown began his college career at Linn–Benton Community College, playing for two seasons and was named first team All- Southern Region by the Northwest Athletic Association of Community Colleges as a sophomore. He transferred to Lewis–Clark State College, an NAIA school, after his sophomore year at the recommendation of LBCC's head coach, Greg Hawk. He was forced to redshirt his junior season due academic issues. In his only season playing for the Warriors, Brown was named a second team NAIA All-American after posting a .386 average in while leading the NAIA with 23 home runs and driving in 82 RBIs (2nd in the NAIA) and scoring 78 runs (3rd) as the Warriors went on to win the 2015 NAIA World Series.

== Professional career ==
=== Oakland Athletics / Athletics ===
The Oakland Athletics selected Brown in the 19th round, with the 578th overall selection, of the 2015 Major League Baseball draft. After signing with the team, he was assigned to the rookie–level Arizona League Athletics before being promoted to the Vermont Lake Monsters of the Low–A New York–Penn League after six games. He batted .289 with 19 doubles, three home runs, 35 RBI and 32 runs scored and was selected to play in the New York–Penn League All-Star Game and was named the Lake Monsters' team MVP. Brown skipped Single–A and began the 2016 season with the High–A Stockton Ports, where he hit .241 with eight home runs and 53 RBI. He was reassigned to the Ports again the next season and increased his offensive production dramatically. Brown was named a California League All-Star and the Player of the Month for August by Minor League Baseball and finished the season with a .270 average while leading the California League with 30 home runs and 109 RBI. Brown spent the 2018 season with the Double–A Midland RockHounds, where he batted .283 with 14 home runs and 90 RBI. He began the 2019 season with the Triple–A Las Vegas Aviators and was batting .297 with 37 home runs, second in the Pacific Coast League, at the time of his promotion to the Major Leagues.

The Athletics selected Brown's contract on August 26, 2019. He made his debut that night against the Kansas City Royals and recorded his first career hit, a single off Jorge López, in his first career at bat went 2-for-6 overall with an RBI and two runs scored in the A's 19-4 win. Brown batted .293 with eight doubles, two triples, 13 RBI and 11 runs scored in 26 games played (75 at bats) in his first Major League season. In 2020, Brown only appeared in 7 games, going hitless in five plate appearances for the club. He had his proper rookie season in 2021, when he hit .214/.274/.480 with 20 home runs and 48 RBI in 111 games.

On June 11, 2022, Brown hit a go-ahead grand slam off of Eli Morgan of the Cleveland Guardians to help lead the Athletics to a 10-5 victory. In 2022 he batted .229/.295/.436. 39.2% of the pitches to him were fastballs, the lowest percentage of those to any major leaguer.

On January 11, 2024, Brown avoided arbitration by signing a one-year, $2.6 million contract with Oakland. This was the second highest contract on the team for a position player. In 63 games for the A's, he hit .189/.251/.306 with five home runs, 15 RBI, and four stolen bases. On June 18, Brown was removed from the 40–man roster and sent outright to Triple–A Las Vegas. On July 11, the Athletics purchased Brown's contract, adding him back to the major league roster. In 124 total appearances for Oakland, he slashed .231/.283/.379 with 14 home runs and 44 RBI.

Brown made 33 appearances for the Athletics in 2025, hitting .192/.311/.288 with one home run, three RBI, and one stolen base. On May 23, 2025, Brown was designated for assignment by the team. He cleared waivers and was sent outright to Triple-A Las Vegas on May 25. On June 6, Brown was added back to the Athletics' active roster. He recorded one hit in five games for the team before suffering a left elbow injury. Brown was released by the Athletics on June 26.

=== Arizona Diamondbacks ===
On July 2, 2025, Brown signed a minor league contract with the Arizona Diamondbacks organization. In 26 appearances for the Triple-A Reno Aces, he batted .291/.381/.544 with six home runs and 21 RBI. Brown was released by Arizona on August 10, after triggering an upward mobility clause in his contract.

=== New York Yankees ===
On January 19, 2026, Brown signed a minor league contract with the New York Yankees. He made 53 appearances for the Triple-A Scranton/Wilkes-Barre Railriders, batting .235/.327/.426 with nine home runs, 21 RBI, and three stolen bases. Brown was released by the Yankees on June 14, after exercising the opt-out clause in his contract.

== Personal life ==
Brown is one of seven siblings. His younger brother, Micah, also played baseball at Lewis–Clark and was a drafted by the Miami Marlins in the 2017 MLB draft. Brown married Brittaney Niebergall, a former Lewis–Clark basketball player who was named the NAIA Freshman Player of the Year and is currently a middle school teacher and basketball coach.

Brown graduated from Lewis–Clark with a degree in criminal justice and has worked for the Idaho Department of Fish and Game during his offseasons.
