= Skye Bolt =

American baseball player (born 1994)

- Outfielder
- Born: January 15, 1994 (age 32); Atlanta, Georgia, U.S.
- Batted: Switch Threw: Right

MLB debut
- May 3, 2019, for the Oakland Athletics

Last MLB appearance
- August 25, 2022, for the Oakland Athletics

MLB statistics
- Batting average: .156
- Home runs: 5
- Runs batted in: 17
- Stats at Baseball Reference

Teams
- Oakland Athletics (2019); San Francisco Giants (2021); Oakland Athletics (2021–2022)

Skye Michael Bolt (born January 15, 1994) is an American former professional baseball outfielder. The Oakland Athletics selected Bolt in the fourth round of the 2015 MLB draft, and he made his MLB debut with them in 2019. He has also played in Major League Baseball (MLB) for the San Francisco Giants. In August 2026, it was announced that he was hired as an Assistant Baseball Coach at University of North Carolina Greensboro.

== Early life ==
Skye Bolt was born in Atlanta, Georgia. He got his name because his father wanted him to have a name that "popped".

== Career ==
=== Amateur career ===
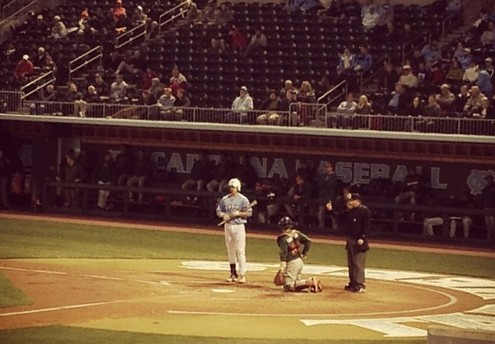
Bolt batting for North Carolina in 2013

Bolt attended Holy Innocents' Episcopal School in Atlanta, Georgia. He played center field for the school's baseball team, and had a .430 batting average in his senior year.

The Washington Nationals selected Bolt in the 26th round of the 2012 MLB draft. He did not sign, and enrolled at the University of North Carolina at Chapel Hill, where he played college baseball for the North Carolina Tar Heels. As a freshman, he was named Second Team All-Atlantic Coast Conference and a Freshman All-American. He also made USA Baseball's collegiate national baseball team. In 2014, Bolt played collegiate summer baseball with the Harwich Mariners of the Cape Cod Baseball League.

=== Oakland Athletics ===
The Oakland Athletics selected Bolt in the fourth round, with the 128th overall selection, of the 2015 Major League Baseball draft. He made his professional debut in 2015 with the Vermont Lake Monsters, hitting .238/.325/.381 with four home runs and 19 RBI.

In 2016, he played for the Beloit Snappers, hitting .231/.318/.345 with 5 home runs and 37 RBI, and was a mid-season All Star. In 2017, he played for the Stockton Ports of the High–A California League, hitting .243/.327/.435 with 76 runs (10th in the league), 7 triples (7th), 15 home runs, 53 walks (6th), and 66 RBI, and was a mid-season All Star.

In 2018, he began the season with the Midland RockHounds of the Double–A Texas League, but struggled and was sent down to Stockton, with whom he was a mid-season All Star. He was promoted back to Midland in June. For the week of July 30 through August 5, Bolt was the Texas League's Player of the Week. He hit a combined .260/.347/.474 with 19 home runs, 19 stolen bases, and 69 RBI during the 2018 season, and was an MiLB Organization All Star. After the season, the Athletics assigned him to the Mesa Solar Sox of the Arizona Fall League, with whom in 73 at bats he hit .247/.353/.493. Also, the Athletics added Bolt to their 40-man roster, protecting him from the Rule 5 draft.

In 2019, he began the season with the Las Vegas Aviators of the Triple–A Pacific Coast League, for whom that season he batted .269/.350/.459 with 11 home runs and 61 RBI. The Athletics promoted him to the major leagues for the first time on May 3, 2019, and he made his MLB debut that night. He had 10 MLB at-bats in 2019.

Bolt did not appear in a game for the Athletics in the pandemic-shortened 2020 season. On April 1, 2021, Bolt was designated for assignment by Oakland.

=== San Francisco Giants ===
On April 5, 2021, Bolt was claimed off waivers by the San Francisco Giants. On April 30, Bolt was designated for assignment by the Giants following the promotion of Zack Littell. Bolt only appeared in 2 games for the Giants, registering a single plate appearance.

=== Oakland Athletics (second stint) ===
On May 5, 2021, Bolt was traded back to the Oakland Athletics in exchange for cash considerations and was assigned to the Triple-A Las Vegas Aviators. On June 1, Bolt was called up by the Athletics. On June 12, Bolt recorded his first career home run, against Kansas City Royals reliever Wade Davis. With Oakland, he batted .089/.105/.161 in 56 at-bats. However, his 2021 Triple-A Las Vegas Aviators performance was the polar opposite -- crushing a .387/.492/.650 with a minor league career high 16.1% BB rate and lowered his K rate to 21.6%.

On May 29, 2022, Bolt was placed on the 60-day injured list with a strained left hamstring. He was activated from the injured list on June 30. Bolt performed well in Triple-A again in 2022, slashing .326/.385/.526 with 4 home runs and 23 RBI in 24 games. In the majors, he appeared a career-high 42 games, hitting .198/.259/.330 with career-bests in home runs (4) and RBI (13). After a brief stint on the injured list with a right knee patella subluxation, Bolt was activated on September 14. He was subsequently removed from the 40-man roster and sent outright to Triple–A Las Vegas. He elected free agency following the season on November 10.

=== Milwaukee Brewers ===
On January 27, 2023, Bolt signed a minor league contract with the Milwaukee Brewers organization. In 64 games for the Triple-A Nashville Sounds, he batted .257/.359/.367 with 3 home runs and 23 RBI. On September 24, Bolt was released by Milwaukee.

=== Atlanta Braves ===
On February 23, 2024, Bolt signed a minor league contract with the Atlanta Braves. In 41 games split between the rookie–level Florida Complex League Braves and Triple–A Gwinnett Stripers, he batted .227/.343/.336 with two home runs and 18 RBI. Bolt was released by the Braves organization on August 6.
