= Ramón Laureano =

Dominican baseball player (born 1994)

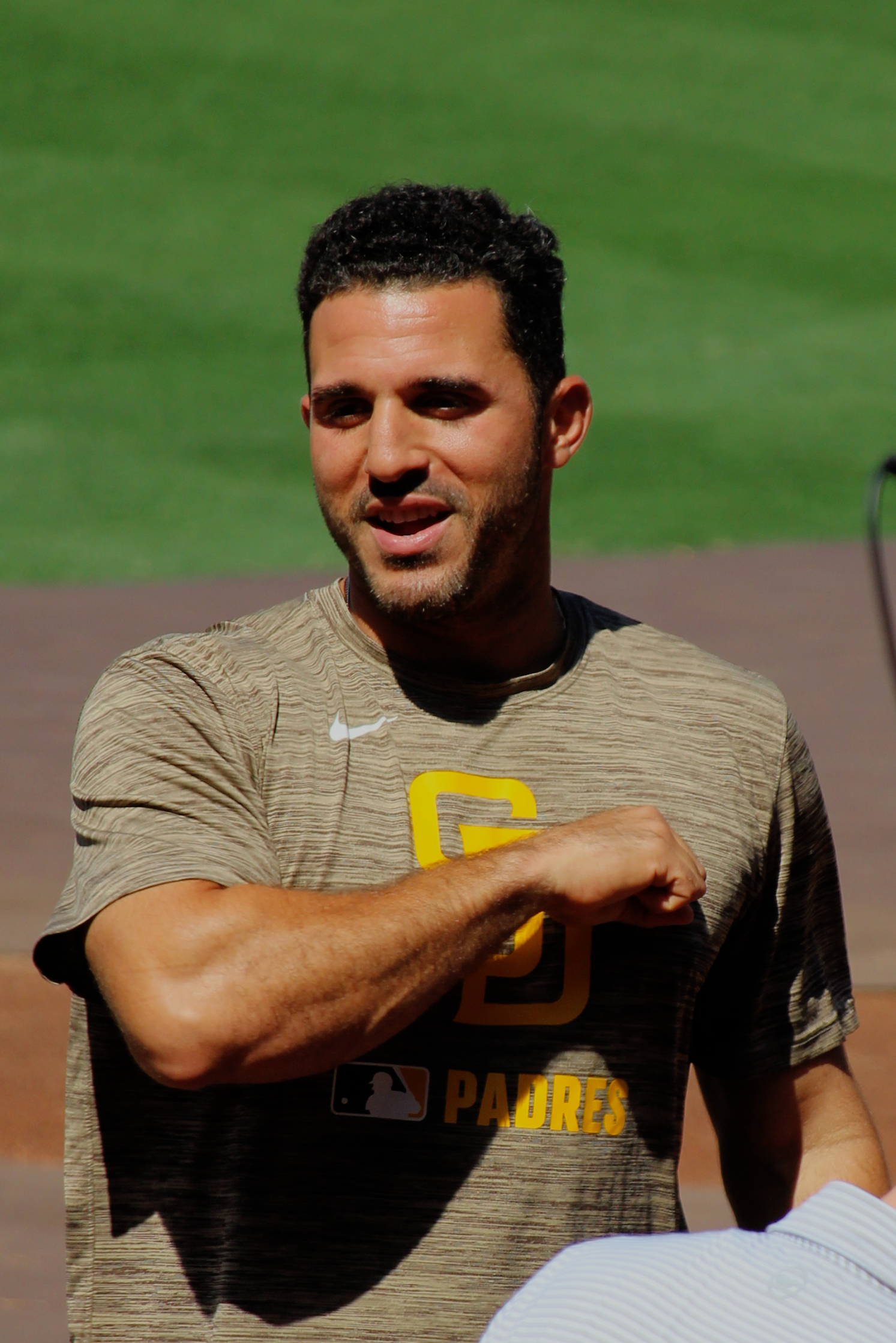
- Laureano with the Padres in 2025

Leones del Escogido
- Outfielder
- Born: July 15, 1994 (age 32); Santo Domingo, Dominican Republic
- Bats: Right Throws: Right

MLB debut
- August 3, 2018, for the Oakland Athletics

MLB statistics (through 2026 season)
- Batting average: .250
- Home runs: 113
- Runs batted in: 349
- Stats at Baseball Reference

Teams
- Oakland Athletics (2018–2023); Cleveland Guardians (2023–2024); Atlanta Braves (2024); Baltimore Orioles (2025); San Diego Padres (2025–2026)

Ramón Emilio Laureano Jr. (born July 15, 1994) is a Dominican professional baseball outfielder who is a free agent. He has played in Major League Baseball (MLB) for the Oakland Athletics, Cleveland Guardians, Atlanta Braves, Baltimore Orioles, and San Diego Padres. He made his MLB debut in 2018 with the Athletics.

== Early life ==
Ramón Laureano is the only son of Nina and Ramón Laureano. He was raised in Santo Domingo, Dominican Republic.

== Career ==
=== Houston Astros ===
Laureano played college baseball at Northeastern Oklahoma A&M College and was drafted by the Houston Astros in the 16th round of the 2014 Major League Baseball draft. He made his professional debut with the Greeneville Astros in 2014. He batted .189 with one home run and two RBIs in 16 games, and played 2015 with the Quad Cities River Bandits, batting .265 with four home runs, 34 RBIs and 18 stolen bases. Laureano started 2016 with the Lancaster JetHawks and was promoted to the Corpus Christi Hooks in July. Laureano finished 2016 with a combined .319 batting average along with 15 home runs, 73 RBIs and a .955 OPS in 116 total games between both teams. He returned to Corpus Christi in 2017 where he posted a .227 batting average with 11 home runs, 55 RBIs and 24 stolen bases.

=== Oakland Athletics ===
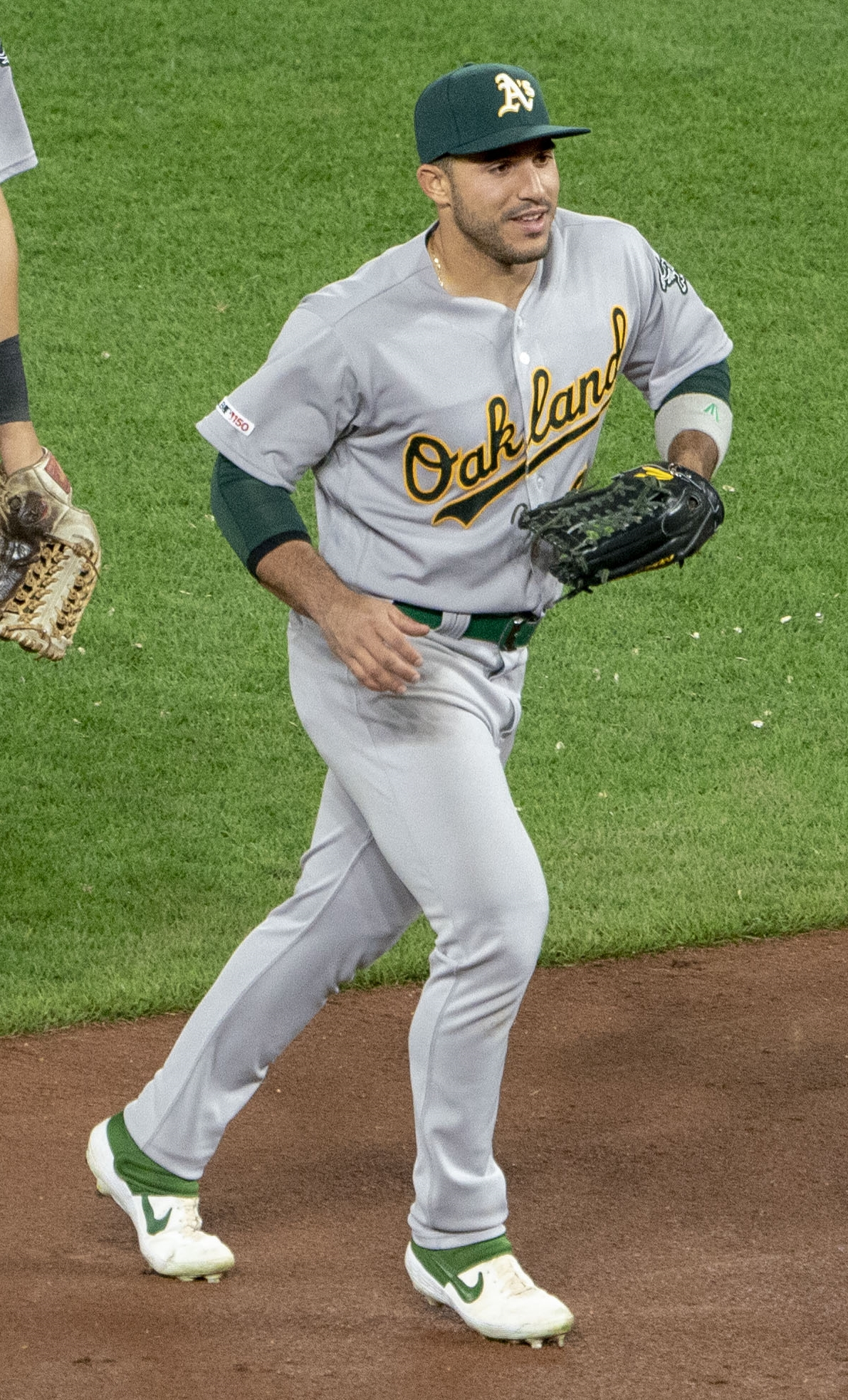
Laureano in 2019

After the 2017 season, Laureano was eligible to be selected during the Rule 5 draft. Instead of placing him on the 40-man roster to prevent his selection, the Astros traded Laureano to the Oakland Athletics in exchange for pitcher Brandon Bailey on November 20, 2017.

On August 3, 2018, the Athletics called up Laureano, and he made his major league debut. His first major league hit that night was a walk-off single to break a scoreless tie in the 13th inning against the Detroit Tigers. Since the RBI became a stat in 1920, Laureano is the first Athletic to hit a walk-off RBI hit as their first major league hit. On August 20, 2018, he hit his first two major league home runs off Bartolo Colón in a 9–0 shutout victory over the Texas Rangers. On September 7, 2018, he hit two more home runs in an 8–4 win over the Rangers, becoming the first player in A's franchise history to have two multi-homer games in his first 30 career games, achieving the feat in 29 games played.

On May 7, 2019, Laureano robbed Joey Votto of a home run in the sixth inning against the Cincinnati Reds, which would aid Mike Fiers's second career no-hitter. In 2019, Laureano batted .288 with 24 home runs and 67 RBIs. On defense he led all major league center fielders in errors, with 7, and had the lowest fielding percentage of all major center fielders (.974). In the Wild Card Game, Laureano drove in the Athletics' only run with a sacrifice fly. The Athletics were defeated 5–1 by the Tampa Bay Rays.

On August 9, 2020, Laureano was ejected for the first time in his career for charging at the Houston Astros bench to go after Astros hitting coach Alex Cintrón, causing the benches to empty. He was suspended six games on August 11 due to the incident, while Cintron was suspended for 20. On appeal, Laureano's suspension was reduced to four games, beginning on August 14.

In 2020, he batted .213, with 6 home runs, 25 RBIs, posted a .338 on-base percentage and a .366 slugging percentage. He had an AL-leading 12 hit by pitches.

On August 6, 2021, Laureano was suspended by MLB for 80 games for testing positive for the performance-enhancing drug nandrolone. On October 1, Laureano underwent core surgery. His suspension continued through the first 27 games of the 2022 season.

On May 8, 2022, Laureano played his first game after his suspension.

On January 13, 2023, Laureano signed a one-year, $3.55 million contract with the Athletics, avoiding salary arbitration. In 64 games for Oakland, he batted .213/.280/.364 with 6 home runs, 21 RBI, and 8 stolen bases. Despite having the third highest rWAR on the Athletics, he was designated for assignment on August 5.

=== Cleveland Guardians ===
On August 7, 2023, Laureano was claimed off waivers by the Cleveland Guardians. He played in 41 games for Cleveland down the stretch, hitting .243/.342/.382 with three home runs and 14 RBI.

Laureano struggled for Cleveland in 2024, batting .143/.265/.229 with one home run and four RBI across 31 contests. The Guardians designated Laureano for assignment on May 20, 2024. After clearing waivers, Laureano was released by the Guardians on May 25, 2024, while being owed $5.15 million by the team.

=== Atlanta Braves ===
On May 29, 2024, Laureano signed a minor league contract with the Atlanta Braves organization. He made 14 appearances with the Triple–A Gwinnett Stripers, posting a .362 batting average with three home runs and 12 RBI. On June 15, the Braves selected Laureano's contract, adding him to their active roster, after incumbent center fielder Michael Harris II suffered a hamstring strain. In 67 games for Atlanta, he slashed .296/.327/.505 with 10 home runs, 29 RBI, and five stolen bases. On November 22, the Braves non–tendered Laureano, making him a free agent.

Following the 2024 season, Laureano signed with the Leones del Escogido to play winter league baseball in the Dominican Professional Baseball League.

=== Baltimore Orioles ===
On February 4, 2025, Laureano signed a one-year, $4 million contract with the Baltimore Orioles. In 82 appearances for the Orioles, Laureano batted .290/.355/.529 with 15 home runs, 46 RBI, and four stolen bases.

=== San Diego Padres ===
On July 31, 2025, the Orioles traded Laureano and Ryan O'Hearn to the San Diego Padres in exchange for Boston Bateman, Tyson Neighbors, Tanner Smith, Brandon Butterworth, Cobb Hightower, and Victor Figueroa. He finished the season with a .281 batting average, 24 home runs, and 76 runs batted in. On September 24, Laureano sprained his finger while against the Milwaukee Brewers and would miss at least the first round of the postseason. However, the Padres lost the series to the Chicago Cubs 2–1, officially ending his and the Padres' season.

In 2026, Laureano made the Padres' Opening Day roster as their left fielder. He made 53 appearances for San Diego, batting .203/.286/.374 with seven home runs, 21 RBI, and seven stolen bases. On June 2, 2026, Laureano was placed on the 10-day injured list due to right hip inflammation. On June 5, it was announced that he had undergone labrum surgery on his hip, ruling him out for 4-to-5 months and likely ending his season. Laureano was transferred to the 60-day injured list the same day.

== Skills profile ==
Laureano has drawn attention for the strength and accuracy of his arm.
