= A. J. Cole =

American baseball player (born 1992)

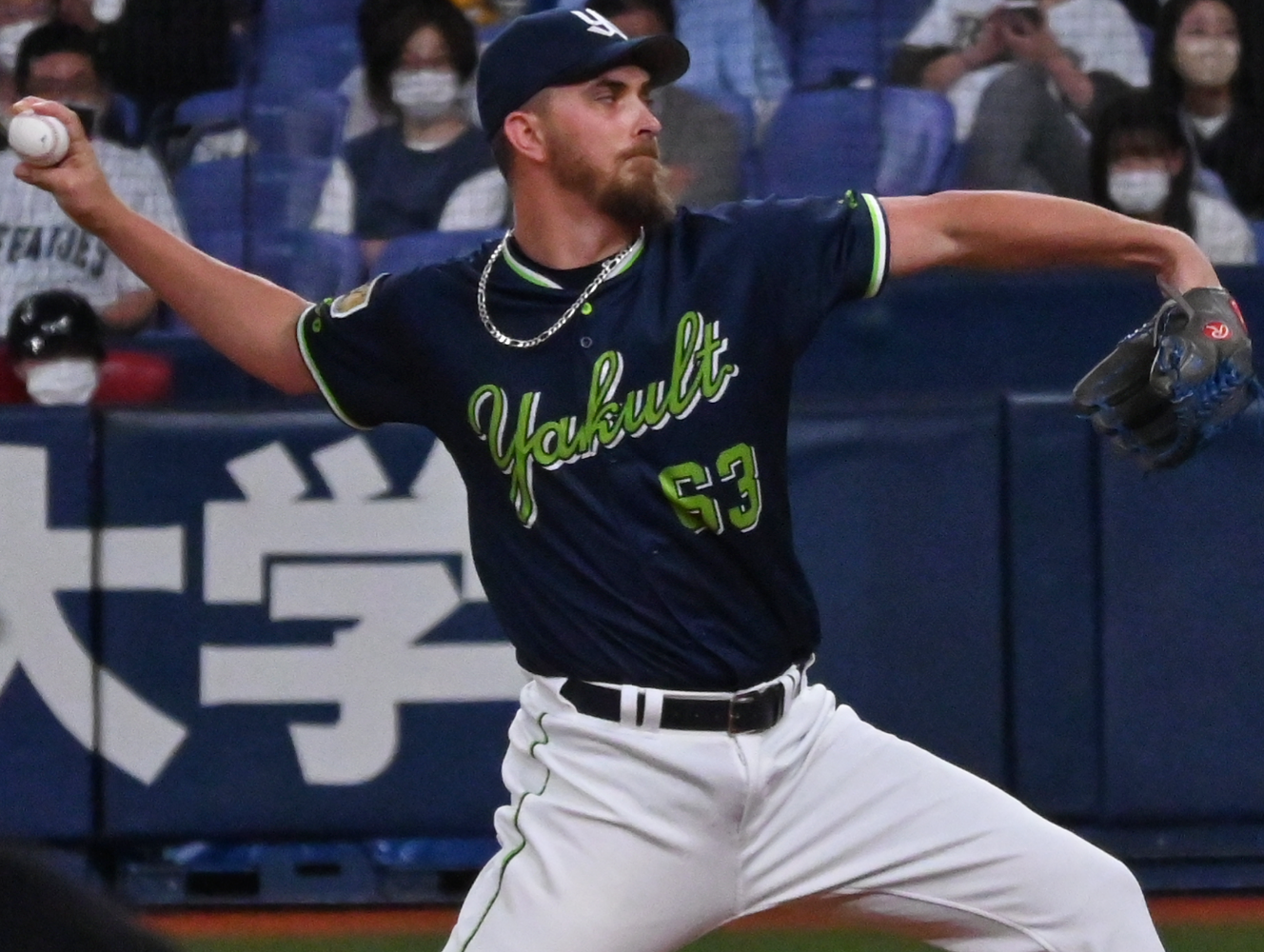
- Cole with the Tokyo Yakult Swallows
- Pitcher
- Born: January 5, 1992 (age 34); Winter Springs, Florida, U.S.
- Batted: Right Threw: Right

Professional debut
- MLB: April 28, 2015, for the Washington Nationals
- NPB: April 22, 2022, for the Tokyo Yakult Swallows

Last appearance
- MLB: May 27, 2021, for the Toronto Blue Jays
- NPB: October 6, 2022, for the Tokyo Yakult Swallows

MLB statistics
- Win–loss record: 14–10
- Earned run average: 4.51
- Strikeouts: 208

NPB statistics
- Win–loss record: 2–0
- Earned run average: 2.75
- Strikeouts: 32
- Stats at Baseball Reference

Teams
- Washington Nationals (2015–2018); New York Yankees (2018); Cleveland Indians (2019); Toronto Blue Jays (2020–2021); Tokyo Yakult Swallows (2022)

Andrew Jordan Cole (born January 5, 1992) is an American former professional baseball pitcher. He played in Major League Baseball (MLB) for the Washington Nationals, New York Yankees, Cleveland Indians, and Toronto Blue Jays, and in Nippon Professional Baseball (NPB) for the Tokyo Yakult Swallows.

== Amateur career ==
Cole attended Oviedo High School in Oviedo, Florida. He played for the school's baseball team, and committed to attend the University of Miami on a college baseball scholarship. Considered a potential first-round pick in the 2010 Major League Baseball draft, Cole fell in the draft due to his commitment to Miami and reportedly due to a high signing bonus demand. The Washington Nationals selected Cole in the fourth round of the draft. He received a $2 million signing bonus to forgo his commitment to Miami, a record bonus for a fourth-round pick.

== Professional career ==
=== Washington Nationals ===
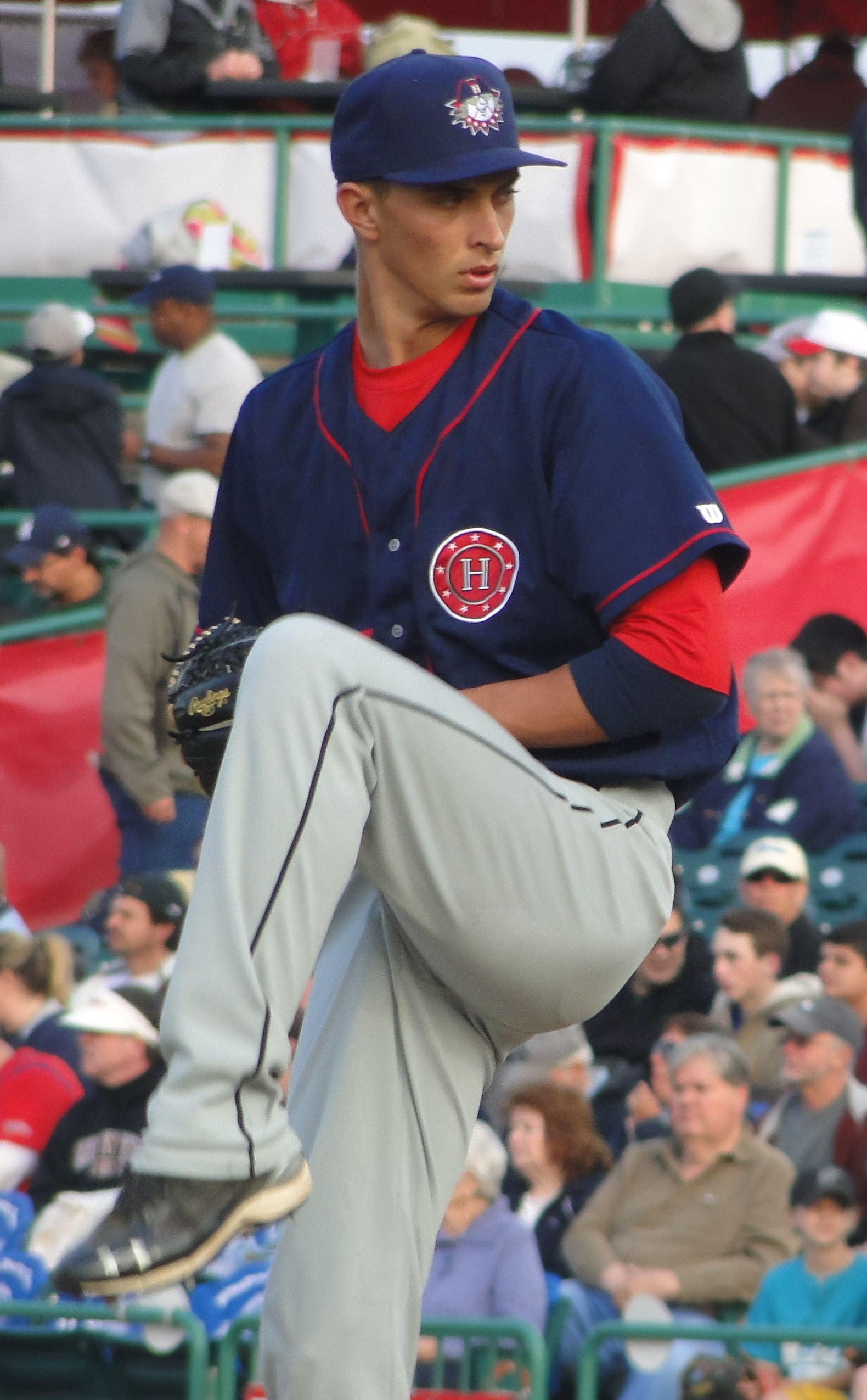
Cole pitching for the Hagerstown Suns in 2011

Cole pitched for the Vermont Lake Monsters of the Class A-Short Season New York–Penn League after he signed with the Nationals in 2010, and for the Hagerstown Suns of the Class A South Atlantic League in 2011. In those two seasons, Cole recorded 109 strikeouts in 90 innings pitched.

=== Oakland Athletics ===
On December 23, 2011, Cole was traded with Derek Norris, Tommy Milone, and Brad Peacock to the Oakland Athletics for Gio González and Robert Gilliam. Assigned to the Stockton Ports of the Class A-Advanced California League to start the 2012 season, Cole struggled, pitching to a 0–7 win–loss record with a 7.82 earned run average, allowing a batting average against of .364 in eight games. The Athletics demoted him to the Burlington Bees of the Class A Midwest League, where he made 19 starts, pitching to a 2.07 ERA and recording 102 strikeouts compared to 19 walks in 95 2/3 innings.

=== Washington Nationals (second stint) ===
On January 16, 2013, Cole was traded back to Washington along with Blake Treinen and a player to be named later (later identified as Ian Krol) in a three-team trade that sent Michael Morse to the Seattle Mariners and John Jaso to Oakland. Cole pitched for the Potomac Nationals of the Class A-Advanced Carolina League, and was named to appear in the 2013 All-Star Futures Game. He was promoted to the Harrisburg Senators of the Class AA Eastern League during the season. In 2014, Cole began the year with Harrisburg, and received a promotion to the Syracuse Chiefs of the Class AAA International League. After the 2014 season, the Nationals added Cole to their 40-man roster.

Cole opened the 2015 season as the Opening Day starting pitcher for Syracuse. The Nationals promoted Cole to the major leagues to make a start in place of Max Scherzer on April 28.; while Cole had a miserable outing, giving up nine runs in only two innings, he would get a no-decision after the Nationals, who had lost six straight, would come back to win the game 13–12, starting a span where they won 20 of 25 games and jumped from last to first in the NL East. Cole only appeared in two more games for the Nationals, both out of the bullpen, in 2015. He continued to make starts after being optioned back to Syracuse. While he was called up after rosters expanded in September, he did not pitch in another major league game before the end of the season.

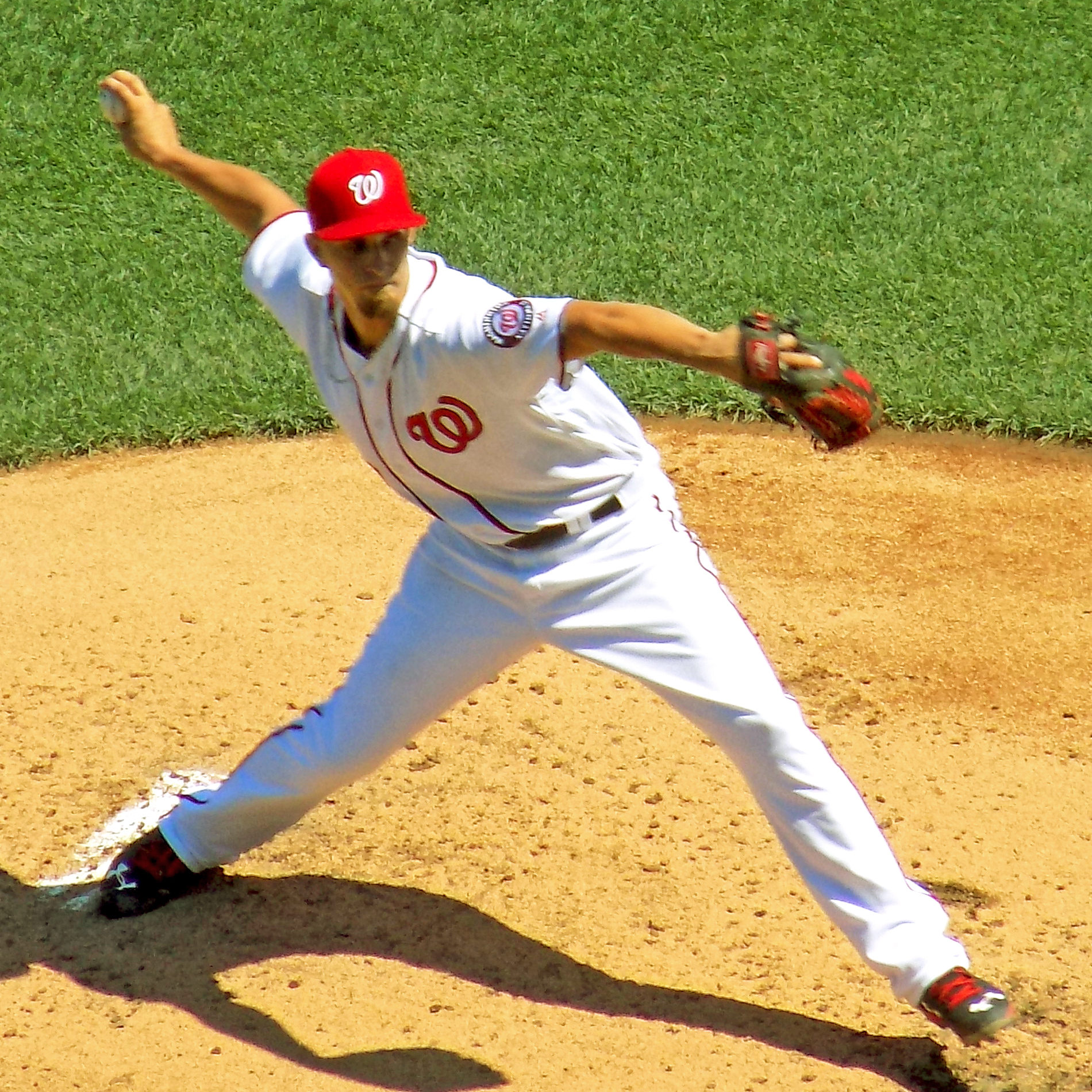
Cole with the Nationals in 2016

Cole spent the 2016 season again pitching in Syracuse's rotation. Working exclusively as a starter, he pitched to a 4.26 ERA (up by more than a full run from 2015) over 22 games, including two complete-game performances, before he was called up by the Nationals on August 18, 2016, to fill in as a reliever. Due to the Nationals' acquisition of closer Mark Melancon in July, who wears the number #43 as a Washington player, Cole exchanged his number #43 for #22 upon being called up. Cole was placed in the Nationals' rotation later in the month after Stephen Strasburg went on the disabled list. He notched his first career win on September 2, 2016, against the New York Mets, giving up just one earned run on three hits and two walks over six innings on the road. On September 26, Cole was ejected for the first time in his Major League career after throwing a pitch behind Jung-ho Kang. Thereafter, tempers flared with the benches clearing, but the Nationals nonetheless won 10–7 over the Pirates.

Cole began the 2017 season with the Class AAA Syracuse Chiefs. The Nationals called him up on May 1 and he posted his first win of the year when the Nationals beat the Philadelphia Phillies on May 6, but the team optioned him back to Syracuse on May 12. The Nationals called him up again on June 18, but he did not appear in any games before the Nationals optioned him back to Syracuse on June 22. He was called up again on August 2 for a spot start against the Miami Marlins in a game the Marlins won 7–0 to clinch a series win; he took two more losses – to the Marlins again on August 8 and to the San Francisco Giants in the first game of a doubleheader on August 13 – and returned to Syracuse on August 15. The Nationals called him up for another spot start on August 25, this time against the New York Mets; although he gave up only one run in six innings and had a personal-best eight strikeouts, the Mets won the game 4–2, and he returned to Syracuse on August 27. The Nationals recalled him on September 4 to start against the Marlins that day, and he earned the win in a 7–2 Nationals victory. He finished out the regular season with the Nationals, appearing both as a starter and a reliever. He took the loss in a game against the Los Angeles Dodgers at Nationals Park on September 16, but on September 25 he started against the Phillies and outdueled Phillies pitcher Aaron Nola for the win, also notching his first career major-league hit when he singled up the middle off Nola. On September 30, Cole came into a game in long relief against the Pittsburgh Pirates and pitched 3 2/3 no-hit innings, although the Nationals eventually lost despite his efforts. Cole completed the season with a 3–5 record and a 3.81 ERA across 52 innings, starting eight games and appearing in relief in three others, giving up 22 earned runs on 51 hits, eight of them home runs, and with 44 strikeouts and 27 walks.

Cole made the Nationals′ Opening Day roster for the first time in 2018, beginning the season as the Nationals' fifth starter. In his first start of the season, on April 3 against the Atlanta Braves, he hit the first major-league home run of his career, a 395-foot (120-meter) solo shot to left off Braves starter Julio Teherán that tied the game in the second inning, but he gave up 10 earned runs to the Braves – tying Jeremy Guthrie for the Montreal-Washington franchise record for earned runs given up in a game by a starter – on 10 hits, three walks, and four strikeouts in 3 2/3 innings in a near-redux of his 2015 debut. Following an abbreviated – but much more effective – second start on April 11 in which he gave up two runs in 5 1/3 innings against the Braves, he was reassigned to the bullpen to make room in the rotation for veteran Jeremy Hellickson. He was charged with one earned run each in two appearances out of the bullpen against the New York Mets, giving him a 13.06 ERA in 10 1/3 innings of work in 2018, and although he got the win in his first appearance against the Mets, both of his outings against them saw him surrender a multi-run home run, including a grand slam on April 18. The Nationals designated him for assignment on April 20, 2018, ending a three-and-a-half-year stint on the Nationals' 40-man roster. During his overall Nationals career, he had made 19 starts and appeared in relief seven times, pitching to a 5.32 ERA in 110 innings of work.

=== New York Yankees ===
The Nationals traded Cole to the New York Yankees for cash considerations on April 23. Cole made his debut for the Yankees in relief in a game against the Los Angeles Angels on April 28. Pitching exclusively out of the bullpen for the Yankees, Cole pitched to a 4.26 ERA in 38 innings.

On January 4, 2019, AJ Cole was designated for assignment by the Yankees to make room for newly signed Troy Tulowitzki.

=== Cleveland Indians ===
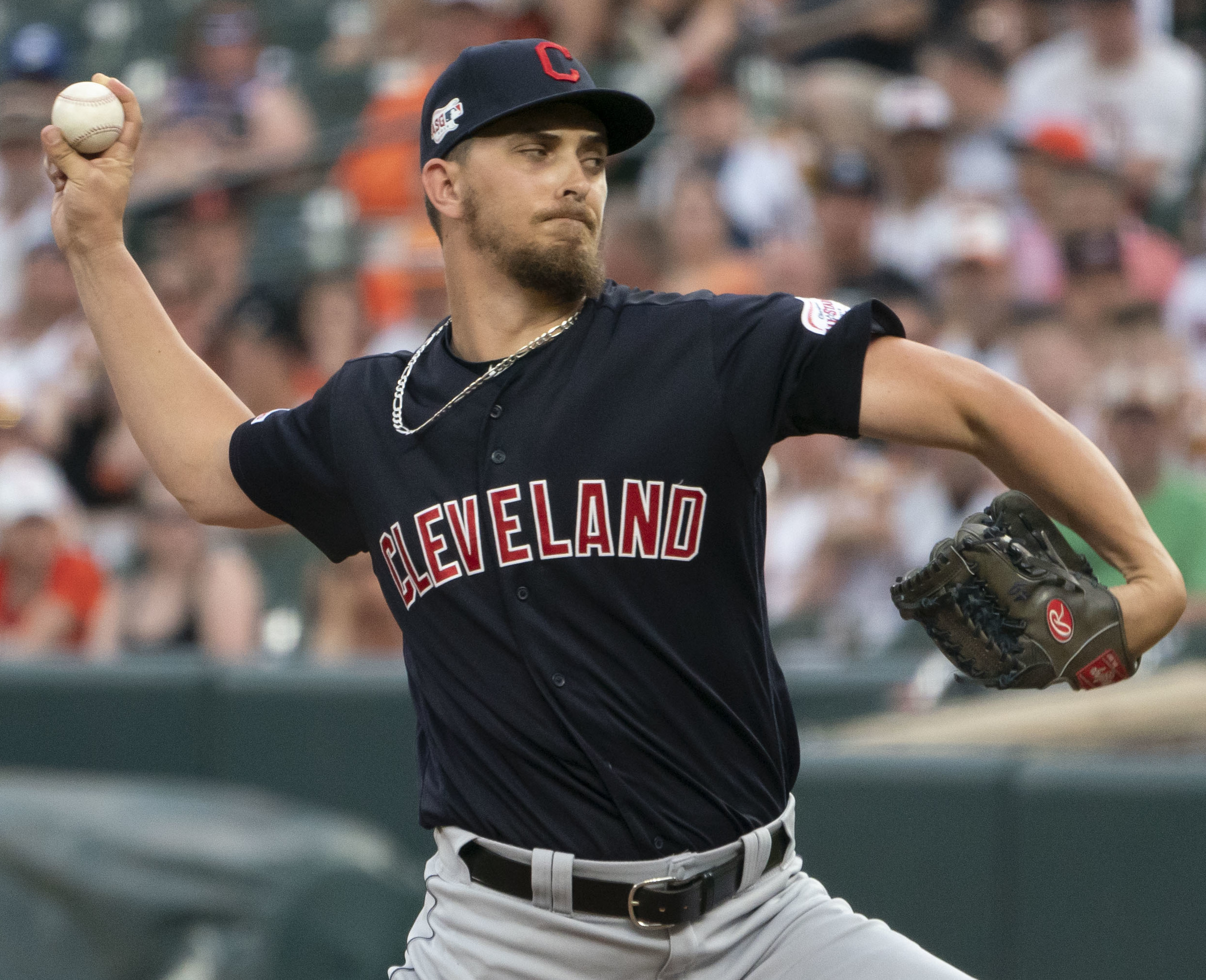
Cole with the Cleveland Indians in 2019

On January 11, 2019, Cole was claimed off waivers by the Cleveland Indians. Cole was designated for assignment on February 4, 2019, following the acquisition of Nick Wittgren. After clearing waivers, Cole was outrighted to the minor leagues on February 11, 2019; the same day, he was extended a non-roster invitation to the Indians' major league spring training camp. He opened the 2019 season with the Columbus Clippers. On May 11, his contract was selected. Following the 2019 season, Cole was outrighted off the Indians roster and became a free agent.

=== Toronto Blue Jays ===
On December 2, 2019, Cole signed with the Toronto Blue Jays on a minor-league deal with an invitation to spring training. Cole made the Opening Day roster for the Blue Jays in 2020, and was selected to the roster on July 23, 2020. With the 2020 Toronto Blue Jays, Cole appeared in 24 games, compiling a 3–0 record with 3.09 ERA and 20 strikeouts in 23.1 innings pitched. On December 2, 2020, Cole was nontendered by the Blue Jays.

On January 8, 2021, Cole re-signed with Toronto on a minor league contract. On May 8, 2021, Cole was selected to the active roster. On June 12, he was placed on the 60-day injured list with a left oblique strain. In 6 appearances for the Blue Jays in 2021, Cole posted a 1.13 ERA with 7 strikeouts. On September 8, Cole was outrighted off of the 40-man roster and assigned to the Triple-A Buffalo Bisons. On October 5, Cole elected free agency.

=== Tokyo Yakult Swallows ===
On December 7, 2021, Cole signed with the Tokyo Yakult Swallows of Nippon Professional Baseball. He made 34 appearances for Yakult in 2022, posting a 2.75 ERA with 32 strikeouts in 36.0 innings pitched. Cole and the Swallows parted ways following the season on November 1, 2022.

=== High Point Rockers ===
On April 28, 2023, Cole signed with the High Point Rockers of the Atlantic League of Professional Baseball. In 24 starts for High Point, he registered a 3–2 record and 3.91 ERA with 36 strikeouts in 25 1/3 innings pitched. On July 16, Cole was released by the Rockers.

== Personal life ==
Cole married his wife, Christine Pulliam Cole, in 2015.
