= 2019 Cleveland Indians season =

2019 Cleveland Indians
- League: American League
- Division: Central
- Ballpark: Progressive Field
- City: Cleveland, Ohio
- Record: 93–69 (.574)
- Divisional place: 2nd
- Owners: Larry Dolan
- President of baseball operations: Chris Antonetti
- General managers: Mike Chernoff
- Managers: Terry Francona
- Television: SportsTime Ohio · WKYC (Matt Underwood, Rick Manning)
- Radio: WTAM · WMMS; Cleveland Indians Radio Network (Tom Hamilton, Jim Rosenhaus, Rick Manning)

The 2019 Cleveland Indians season was the 119th season for the franchise. It was the seventh season under the leadership of manager Terry Francona and fourth under general manager Mike Chernoff. The Indians played their home games at Progressive Field in Cleveland, Ohio. In April 2019, the Indians extended Francona's contract for two more years. Although they improved upon their 91–71 campaign from the previous season, they failed to win the American League Central (due to the Minnesota Twins going 101–61) and failed to qualify for the playoffs for the first time since 2015.

== Season standings ==
=== American League Central ===
AL Central
Team	W	L	Pct.	GB	Home	Road
Minnesota Twins	101	61	.623	—	46‍–‍35	55‍–‍26
Cleveland Indians	93	69	.574	8	49‍–‍32	44‍–‍37
Chicago White Sox	72	89	.447	28½	39‍–‍41	33‍–‍48
Kansas City Royals	59	103	.364	42	31‍–‍50	28‍–‍53
Detroit Tigers	47	114	.292	53½	22‍–‍59	25‍–‍55

=== American League Wild Card ===
Division leaders
Team	W	L	Pct.
Houston Astros	107	55	.660
New York Yankees	103	59	.636
Minnesota Twins	101	61	.623

Wild Card teams (Top 2 teams qualify for postseason)
Team	W	L	Pct.	GB
Oakland Athletics	97	65	.599	+1
Tampa Bay Rays	96	66	.593	—
Cleveland Indians	93	69	.574	3
Boston Red Sox	84	78	.519	12
Texas Rangers	78	84	.481	18
Chicago White Sox	72	89	.447	23½
Los Angeles Angels	72	90	.444	24
Seattle Mariners	68	94	.420	28
Toronto Blue Jays	67	95	.414	29
Kansas City Royals	59	103	.364	37
Baltimore Orioles	54	108	.333	42
Detroit Tigers	47	114	.292	48½

=== Record against opponents ===
2019 American League record Source: MLB Standings Grid – 2019
Team	BAL	BOS	CWS	CLE	DET	HOU	KC	LAA	MIN	NYY	OAK	SEA	TB	TEX	TOR	NL
Baltimore	—	7–12	3–3	3–4	3–4	2–4	3–3	4–3	0–6	2–17	1–6	3–4	7–12	1–6	8–11	7–13
Boston	12–7	—	5–2	3–3	5–2	2–4	5–1	4–3	3–3	5–14	4–3	4–3	7–12	4–3	11–8	10–10
Chicago	3–3	2–5	—	11–8	12–6	4–3	9–10	2–5	6–13	4–3	1–5	2–4	2–4	4–3	4–3	6–14
Cleveland	4–3	3–3	8–11	—	18–1	3–4	12–7	6–0	10–9	4–3	1–5	5–1	1–6	4–3	6–1	8–12
Detroit	4–3	2–5	6–12	1–18	—	1–6	10–9	3–3	5–14	3–3	1–6	1–6	2–4	0–6	3–4	5–15
Houston	4–2	4–2	3–4	4–3	6–1	—	5–1	14–5	3–4	4–3	11–8	18–1	3–4	13–6	4–2	11–9
Kansas City	3–3	1–5	10–9	7–12	9–10	1–5	—	2–4	5–14	2–5	2–5	2–5	3–4	2–5	1–6	9–11
Los Angeles	3–4	3–4	5–2	0–6	3–3	5–14	4–2	—	1–5	2–5	6–13	10–9	3–4	9–10	6–1	12–8
Minnesota	6–0	3–3	13–6	9–10	14–5	4–3	14–5	5–1	—	2–4	3–4	5–2	5–2	6–1	4–3	8–12
New York	17–2	14–5	3–4	3–4	3–3	3–4	5–2	5–2	4–2	—	2–4	6–1	12–7	3–3	11–8	12–8
Oakland	6–1	3–4	5–1	5–1	6–1	8–11	5–2	13–6	4–3	4–2	—	10–9	4–3	13–6	0–6	11–9
Seattle	4–3	3–4	4–2	1–5	6–1	1–18	5–2	9–10	2–5	1–6	9–10	—	2–4	8–11	4–2	9–11
Tampa Bay	12–7	12–7	4–2	6–1	4–2	4–3	4–3	4–3	2–5	7–12	3–4	4–2	—	3–3	13–6	14–6
Texas	6–1	3–4	3–4	3–4	6–0	6–13	5–2	10–9	1–6	3–3	6–13	11–8	3–3	—	3–3	9–11
Toronto	11–8	8–11	3–4	1–6	4–3	2–4	6–1	1–6	3–4	8–11	6–0	2–4	6–13	3–3	—	3–17

== Roster ==
2019 Cleveland Indians
Roster
Pitchers: 53 Logan Allen; 56 Cody Anderson; 47 Trevor Bauer; 57 Shane Bieber; 59 Carlos Carrasco; 90 Adam Cimber; 66,67 Aaron Civale; 52 Mike Clevinger; 36 Tyler Clippard; 34 A. J. Cole; 46 Jon Edwards; 44 Nick Goody; 33 Brad Hand; 50 James Hoyt; 70 James Karinchak; 28 Corey Kluber; 88 Phil Maton; 49 Tyler Olson; 61 Dan Otero; 39 Óliver Pérez; 65 Zach Plesac; 45 Adam Plutko; 58 Neil Ramírez; 68 Jefry Rodríguez; 31 Danny Salazar; 63 Josh Smith; 62 Nick Wittgren; 54 Hunter Wood	Catchers: 38 Eric Haase; 55 Roberto Pérez; 27 Kevin Plawecki; Infielders: 40 Bobby Bradley; 2 Yu Chang; 7 Ryan Flaherty; 6 Mike Freeman; 22 Jason Kipnis; 12 Francisco Lindor; 17 Brad Miller; 26 Max Moroff; 11 José Ramírez; 41 Carlos Santana; 7 Eric Stamets; 17 Andrew Velazquez	Outfielders: 1 Greg Allen; 10 Jake Bauers; 24 Carlos Gonzalez; 8 Jordan Luplow; 2 Leonys Martín; 35 Oscar Mercado; 30 Tyler Naquin; 66 Yasiel Puig; 32 Franmil Reyes; 4 Bradley Zimmer; Other batters: 13 Hanley Ramírez	Manager: 77 Terry Francona; Coaches: 15 Sandy Alomar Jr. (first base/catchers); 88 Scott Atchison (bullpen); 87 Mike Barnett (replay coordinator); 64 Armando Camacaro (bullpen catcher); 00 Brad Mills (bench/outfield); 82 Ricky Pacione (bullpen catcher); 60 Victor Rodriguez (assistant hitting); 16 Mike Sarbaugh (third base/infield); 85 Brian Sweeney (coach); 29 Ty Van Burkleo (hitting); 51 Carl Willis (pitching)

== Game log ==
2019 Game Log: 93–69 (Home: 49–32; Away: 44–37)
March/April: 16–12 (Home: 7–4; Away: 9–8)

#	Date	Opponent	Score	Win	Loss	Save	Attendance	Record	Streak
1	March 28	@ Twins	0–2	Berríos (1–0)	**Kluber** (0–1)	Rogers (1)	39,519	0–1	L1
2	March 30	@ Twins	2–1	**Edwards** (1–0)	Parker (0–1)	**Hand** (1)	15,271	1–1	W1
3	March 31	@ Twins	3–9	Pérez (1–0)	**Carrasco** (0–1)	—	15,613	1–2	L1
4	April 1	White Sox	5–3	**Edwards** (2–0)	Covey (0–1)	**Hand** (2)	34,519	2–2	W1
5	April 3	White Sox	3–8	Rodón (1–1)	**Kluber** (0–2)	—	10,689	2–3	L1
6	April 4	Blue Jays	4–1	**Bauer** (1–0)	Sanchez (1–1)	**Hand** (3)	10,375	3–3	W1
7	April 5	Blue Jays	3–2	**Cimber** (1–0)	Biagini (0–1)	—	12,881	4–3	W2
8	April 6	Blue Jays	7–2	**Carrasco** (1–1)	Pannone (0–2)	—	18,429	5–3	W3
9	April 7	Blue Jays	3–1	**Clevinger** (1–0)	Stroman (0–2)	**Hand** (4)	17,264	6–3	W4
10	April 9	@ Tigers	8–2	**Kluber** (1–2)	Zimmermann (0–1)	—	12,114	7–3	W5
11	April 10	@ Tigers	1–4	Boyd (1–1)	**Bauer** (1–1)	Greene (8)	11,128	7–4	L1
12	April 11	@ Tigers	4–0	**Bieber** (1–0)	Turnbull (0–2)	—	13,910	8–4	W1
13	April 12	@ Royals	1–8	Keller (2–1)	**Carrasco** (1–2)	—	11,950	8–5	L1
14	April 13	@ Royals	0–3	Bailey (1–1)	**Rodríguez** (0–1)	Peralta (1)	15,188	8–6	L2
15	April 14	@ Royals	8–9	Peralta (1–1)	**Hand** (0–1)	—	14,303	8–7	L3
16	April 15	@ Mariners	6–4	**Bauer** (2–1)	Kikuchi (0–1)	**Hand** (5)	11,214	9–7	W1
17	April 16	@ Mariners	4–2	**Bieber** (2–0)	Leake (2–1)	**Hand** (6)	11,826	10–7	W2
18	April 17	@ Mariners	1–0	**Carrasco** (2–2)	Swanson (0–1)	**Wittgren** (1)	13,325	11–7	W3
—	April 19	Braves	Postponed (rain). Makeup date: April 20.						
19	April 20	Braves	8–4	**Kluber** (2–2)	Teherán (2–2)	—	23,035	12–7	W4
20	April 20	Braves	7–8	Jackson (2–0)	**Cimber** (1–1)	Minter (2)	23,035	12–8	L1
21	April 21	Braves	5–11	Fried (3–0)	**Bieber** (2–1)	—	16,039	12–9	L2
22	April 23	Marlins	1–3	López (2–3)	**Ramírez** (0–1)	Romo (3)	12,963	12–10	L3
23	April 24	Marlins	6–4	**Wittgren** (1–0)	Conley (0–3)	—	13,046	13–10	W1
24	April 25	@ Astros	2–1	**Bauer** (3–1)	Cole (1–4)	**Hand** (7)	24,948	14–10	W2
25	April 26	@ Astros	6–3	**Cimber** (2–1)	Rondón (2–1)	**Hand** (8)	38,084	15–10	W3
26	April 27	@ Astros	3–4 (10)	Osuna (2–0)	**Cimber** (2–2)	—	38,667	15–11	L1
27	April 28	@ Astros	1–4	Valdez (1–1)	**Carrasco** (2–3)	Pressly (2)	31,025	15–12	L2
28	April 30	@ Marlins	7–4	**Bauer** (4–1)	Alcántara (1–3)	**Hand** (9)	7,247	16–12	W1

May: 12–17 (Home: 8–10; Away: 4–7)

#	Date	Opponent	Score	Win	Loss	Save	Attendance	Record	Streak
29	May 1	@ Marlins	2–4	Smith (3–0)	**Kluber** (2–3)	Romo (5)	7,262	16–13	L1
30	May 3	Mariners	2–1	**Hand** (1–1)	Swarzak (2–1)	—	16,334	17–13	W1
31	May 4	Mariners	5–4	**Olson** (1–0)	Sadzeck (0–1)	**Hand** (10)	18,420	18–13	W2
32	May 5	Mariners	0–10	Swanson (1–3)	**Anderson** (0–1)	—	19,665	18–14	L1
33	May 6	White Sox	1–9	Nova (1–3)	**Bauer** (4–2)	—	12,745	18–15	L2
34	May 7	White Sox	0–2	Giolito (3–1)	**Rodríguez** (0–2)	Colomé (7)	12,961	18–16	L3
35	May 8	White Sox	5–3	**Hand** (2–1)	Fry (1–1)	—	12,519	19–16	W1
36	May 9	White Sox	5–0 (5)	**Carrasco** (3–3)	Bañuelos (2–2)	—	13,247	20–16	W2
37	May 10	@ Athletics	3–4	Soria (1–2)	**Hand** (2–2)	—	36,913	20–17	L1
38	May 11	@ Athletics	2–3	Treinen (2–2)	Cole (0–1)	—	18,278	20–18	L2
39	May 12	@ Athletics	5–3	**Rodríguez** (1–2)	Mengden (0–1)	**Hand** (11)	18,891	21–18	W1
40	May 13	@ White Sox	2–5	López (3–4)	**Bieber** (2–2)	Colomé (8)	16,471	21–19	L1
41	May 14	@ White Sox	9–0	**Carrasco** (4–3)	Bañuelos (2–3)	—	18,823	22–19	W1
42	May 16	Orioles	14–7	**Cole** (1–1)	Ynoa (0–1)	—	16,324	23–19	W2
43	May 17	Orioles	1–5	Bundy (2–5)	**Rodríguez** (1–3)	—	22,999	23–20	L1
44	May 18	Orioles	4–1	**Plutko** (1–0)	Means (5–4)	**Hand** (12)	25,652	24–20	W1
45	May 19	Orioles	10–0	**Bieber** (3–2)	Ramírez (0–2)	—	21,377	25–20	W2
46	May 20	Athletics	4–6	Anderson (5–3)	**Carrasco** (4–4)	Treinen (8)	12,563	25–21	L1
47	May 21	Athletics	3–5	Hendriks (2–0)	**Bauer** (4–3)	Treinen (9)	13,705	25–22	L2
48	May 22	Athletics	2–7	Montas (6–2)	**Rodríguez** (1–4)	—	17,010	25–23	L3
49	May 23	Rays	2–7	Yarbrough (3–1)	**Plutko** (1–1)	—	18,884	25–24	L4
50	May 24	Rays	3–1	**A. J. Cole** (2–1)	Alvarado (0–4)	**Hand** (13)	24,084	26–24	W1
51	May 25	Rays	2–6	Morton (5–0)	**Carrasco** (4–5)	—	25,882	26–25	L1
52	May 26	Rays	3–6	Beeks (4–0)	**Bauer** (4–4)	Alvarado (6)	20,288	26–26	L2
53	May 27	@ Red Sox	5–12	Porcello (4–4)	**Rodríguez** (1–5)	—	37,113	26–27	L3
54	May 28	@ Red Sox	7–5	**Wittgren** (2–0)	Lakins (0–1)	**Hand** (14)	32,984	27–27	W1
55	May 29	@ Red Sox	14–9	**Bieber** (4–2)	Weber (1–1)	**Hand** (15)	34,824	28–27	W2
56	May 30	@ White Sox	4–10	Bañuelos (3–4)	**Carrasco** (4–6)	—	22,182	28–28	L1
57	May 31	@ White Sox	1–6	Covey (1–4)	**Bauer** (4–5)	—	21,652	28–29	L2

June: 17–9 (Home: 10–4; Away: 7–5)

#	Date	Opponent	Score	Win	Loss	Save	Attendance	Record	Streak
58	June 1	@ White Sox	5–2	**Pérez** (1–0)	Nova (3–5)	**Hand** (16)	25,873	29–29	W1
59	June 2	@ White Sox	0–2	Giolito (8–1)	**Plesac** (0–1)	Colomé (12)	26,453	29–30	L1
60	June 4	Twins	5–2	**Bieber** (5–2)	Smeltzer (0–1)	**Hand** (17)	15,814	30–30	W1
61	June 5	Twins	9–7	**Wittgren** (3–0)	Parker (0–2)	**Hand** (18)	16,962	31–30	W2
62	June 6	Twins	4–5	Berríos (8–2)	**Bauer** (4–6)	Rogers (6)	15,350	31–31	L1
63	June 7	Yankees	5–2	**Plesac** (1–1)	Germán (9–2)	**Hand** (19)	31,531	32–31	W1
64	June 8	Yankees	8–4	**Plutko** (2–1)	Sabathia (3–3)	—	32,239	33–31	W2
65	June 9	Yankees	6–7 (10)	Chapman (1–1)	**Pérez** (1–1)	Tarpley (1)	29,028	33–32	L1
66	June 11	Reds	2–1 (10)	**Hand** (3–2)	Iglesias (1–6)	—	24,101	34–32	W1
67	June 12	Reds	2–7	DeSclafani (3–3)	**Plesac** (1–2)	—	24,045	34–33	L1
68	June 14	@ Tigers	13–4	**Plutko** (3–1)	Carpenter (1–4)	—	22,362	35–33	W1
69	June 15	@ Tigers	4–2	**Bieber** (6–2)	Ramirez (3–1)	**Hand** (20)	25,523	36–33	W2
70	June 16	@ Tigers	8–0	**Bauer** (5–6)	Turnbull (3–6)	—	26,705	37–33	W3
71	June 17	@ Rangers	2–7	Lynn (8–4)	**Clevinger** (1–1)	—	20,860	37–34	L1
72	June 18	@ Rangers	10–3	**Plesac** (2–2)	Sampson (5–4)	—	19,223	38–34	W1
73	June 19	@ Rangers	10–4	**Pérez** (2–1)	Palumbo (0–1)	—	22,906	39–34	W2
74	June 20	@ Rangers	2–4	Minor (7–4)	**Bieber** (6–3)	Kelley (9)	18,531	39–35	L1
75	June 21	Tigers	7–6	**Cimber** (3–2)	Jiménez (2–5)	**Hand** (21)	30,717	40–35	W1
76	June 22	Tigers	2–0	**Civale** (1–0)	Turnbull (3–7)	**Hand** (22)	30,103	41–35	W2
77	June 23	Tigers	8–3	**Plesac** (3–2)	Norris (2–6)	—	25,790	42–35	W3
78	June 24	Royals	3–2 (10)	**Hand** (4–2)	Peralta (2–4)	—	15,413	43–35	W4
79	June 25	Royals	6–8	McCarthy (2–1)	**Hand** (4–3)	Kennedy (10)	21,766	43–36	L1
80	June 26	Royals	5–3	**Bauer** (6–6)	Junis (4–7)	—	22,246	44–36	W1
81	June 28	@ Orioles	0–13	Means (7–4)	**Clevinger** (1–2)	—	21,248	44–37	L1
82	June 29	@ Orioles	0–13	Cashner (8–3)	**Plesac** (3–3)	—	26,998	44–38	L2
83	June 30	@ Orioles	2–0	**Bieber** (7–3)	Ynoa (0–6)	**Hand** (23)	20,048	45–38	W1

July: 18–6 (Home: 8–4; Away: 10–2)

#	Date	Opponent	Score	Win	Loss	Save	Attendance	Record	Streak
84	July 2	@ Royals	9–5	**Bauer** (7–6)	Junis (4–8)	—	18,934	46–38	W2
85	July 3	@ Royals	4–0	**Clevinger** (2–2)	Duffy (3–5)	—	25,049	47–38	W3
86	July 4	@ Royals	8–4	**Cimber** (4–2)	López (1–7)	—	18,076	48–38	W4
87	July 6	@ Reds	7–2	**Bieber** (8–3)	Lorenzen (0–2)	—	36,504	49–38	W5
88	July 7	@ Reds	11–1	**Bauer** (8–6)	Mahle (2–9)	—	27,041	50–38	W6
**90th All-Star Game: Cleveland, OH**
89	July 12	Twins	3–5	Littell (2–0)	**Pérez** (2–2)	Rogers (13)	30,857	50–39	L1
90	July 13	Twins	2–6	Odorizzi (11–4)	**Bauer** (8–7)	—	32,277	50–40	L2
91	July 14	Twins	4–3	**Cimber** (5–2)	May (3–2)	**Hand** (24)	25,194	51–40	W1
92	July 15	Tigers	8–6	**Wittgren** (4–0)	Alcántara (3–2)	**Hand** (25)	15,735	52–40	W2
93	July 16	Tigers	8–0	**Goody** (1–0)	Carpenter (1–6)	—	16,769	53–40	W3
94	July 17	Tigers	7–2	**Clevinger** (3–2)	Turnbull (3–9)	**Wittgren** (2)	18,894	54–40	W4
95	July 18	Tigers	6–3	**Bauer** (9–7)	Boyd (6–8)	**Hand** (26)	17,500	55–40	W5
96	July 19	Royals	10–5	**Bieber** (9–3)	Montgomery (1–3)	—	26,640	56–40	W6
97	July 20	Royals	0–1	Junis (6–8)	**Plutko** (3–2)	Kennedy (17)	31,958	56–41	L1
98	July 21	Royals	5–4	**Plesac** (4–3)	Sparkman (3–6)	**Hand** (27)	23,564	57–41	W1
99	July 22	@ Blue Jays	7–3	**Clevinger** (4–2)	Borucki (0–1)	—	22,295	58–41	W2
100	July 23	@ Blue Jays	1–2 (10)	Giles (2–2)	**Olson** (1–1)	—	22,186	58–42	L1
101	July 24	@ Blue Jays	4–0	**Bieber** (10–3)	Stroman (6–11)	—	25,385	59–42	W1
102	July 25	@ Royals	5–4 (14)	**Goody** (2–0)	Flynn (2–2)	**Cole** (1)	15,244	60–42	W2
103	July 26	@ Royals	8–3	**Plesac** (5–3)	Junis (6–9)	—	26,609	61–42	W3
104	July 27	@ Royals	9–1	**Clevinger** (5–2)	Sparkman (3–7)	—	31,181	62–42	W4
105	July 28	@ Royals	6–9	Duffy (5–5)	**Bauer** (9–8)	Kennedy (20)	14,380	62–43	L1
106	July 30	Astros	0–2	Verlander (14–4)	**Bieber** (10–4)	**Osuna** (24)	21,589	62–44	L2
107	July 31	Astros	10–4	**Plesac** (6–3)	Urquidy (1–1)	—	23,961	63–44	W1

August: 16–13 (Home: 8–5; Away: 8–8)

#	Date	Opponent	Score	Win	Loss	Save	Attendance	Record	Streak
108	August 1	Astros	1–7	Cole (13–5)	**Salazar** (0–1)	—	21,536	63–45	L1
109	August 2	Angels	7–3	**Clevinger** (6–2)	Cole (1–2)	—	28,386	64–45	W1
110	August 3	Angels	7–2	**Plutko** (4–2)	Cahill (3–7)	—	31,222	65–45	W2
111	August 4	Angels	6–2	**Bieber** (11–4)	Barría (4–5)	—	26,099	66–45	W3
112	August 5	Rangers	0–1	Minor (10–6)	**Civale** (1–1)	Leclerc (7)	17,690	66–46	L1
—	August 6	Rangers	Postponed (rain). Makeup date: August 7.						
113	August 7	Rangers	2–0	**Goody** (3–0)	Jurado (6–7)	**Hand** (28)	35,041	67–46	W1
114	August 7	Rangers	5–1	**Clippard** (1–0)	Lynn (14–7)	**Wittgren** (3)	24,888	68–46	W2
115	August 8	@ Twins	7–5	**Clevinger** (7–2)	Gibson (11–5)	**Hand** (29)	32,517	69–46	W3
116	August 9	@ Twins	6–2	**Bieber** (12–4)	Smeltzer (1–2)	—	36,641	70–46	W4
117	August 10	@ Twins	1–4	Odorizzi (13–5)	**Plutko** (4–3)	Rogers (18)	35,268	70–47	L1
118	August 11	@ Twins	7–3 (10)	**Hand** (5–3)	Rogers (2–3)	—	37,849	71–47	W1
119	August 12	Red Sox	6–5	**Hand** (6–3)	Walden (7–2)	—	24,770	72–47	W2
120	August 13	Red Sox	6–7 (10)	Workman (8–1)	**Wittgren** (4–1)	Cashner (1)	26,662	72–48	L1
121	August 14	Red Sox	1–5	Eovaldi (1–0)	**Bieber** (12–5)	—	29,535	72–49	L2
122	August 15	@ Yankees	19–5	**Plutko** (5–3)	Green (2–4)	—	44,654	73–49	W1
123	August 16	@ Yankees	2–3	Tanaka (9–6)	**Civale** (1–2)	Chapman (34)	45,015	73–50	L1
124	August 17	@ Yankees	5–6	Paxton (9–6)	**Plesac** (6–4)	Chapman (35)	47,347	73–51	L2
125	August 18	@ Yankees	8–4	**Clevinger** (8–2)	Sabathia (5–7)	—	45,682	74–51	W1
126	August 20	@ Mets	2–9	Matz (8–7)	**Bieber** (12–6)	—	33,800	74–52	L1
127	August 21	@ Mets	3–4 (10)	Avilán (4–0)	**Hand** (6–4)	—	28,349	74–53	L2
128	August 22	@ Mets	0–2 (8)	Syndergaard (9–6)	**Civale** (1–3)	Sewald (1)	30,998	74–54	L3
129	August 23	Royals	4–1	**Plesac** (7–4)	Junis (8–12)	**Hand** (30)	31,946	75–54	W1
130	August 24	Royals	4–2	**Clevinger** (9–2)	Sparkman (3–9)	**Hand** (31)	33,349	76–54	W2
131	August 25	Royals	8–9 (10)	Kennedy (1–2)	**Goody** (3–1)	López (1)	29,360	76–55	L1
132	August 27	@ Tigers	10–1	**Plutko** (6–3)	Turnbull (3–13)	—	15,715	77–55	W1
133	August 28	@ Tigers	4–2	**Civale** (2–3)	Farmer (5–5)	**Hand** (32)	15,834	78–55	W2
134	August 29	@ Tigers	2–0	**Clevinger** (10–2)	Norris (3–11)	**Hand** (33)	16,855	79–55	W3
135	August 30	@ Rays	0–4	Drake (3–1)	**Bieber** (12–7)	—	15,294	79–56	L1
136	August 31	@ Rays	6–9	Beeks (6–3)	**Plesac** (7–5)	Pagán (16)	13,327	79–57	L2

September: 14–12 (Home: 8–5; Away: 6–7)

#	Date	Opponent	Score	Win	Loss	Save	Attendance	Record	Streak
137	September 1	@ Rays	2–8	Morton (14–6)	**Plutko** (6–4)	—	14,922	79–58	L3
138	September 2	White Sox	11–3	**Civale** (3–3)	Detwiler (2–5)	—	16,149	80–58	W1
139	September 3	White Sox	5–6	Marshall (4–2)	**Carrasco** (4–7)	Colomé (26)	17,397	80–59	L1
140	September 4	White Sox	8–6	**Bieber** (13–7)	Nova (9–12)	**Wittgren** (4)	25,488	81–59	W1
141	September 5	White Sox	1–7	López (9–12)	Plesac (7–6)	—	18,913	81–60	L1
142	September 6	@ Twins	6–2 (11)	**Clippard** (1–0)	Thorpe (2–2)	—	35,418	82–60	W1
143	September 7	@ Twins	3–5	Littell (4–0)	**Cimber** (5–3)	Rogers (25)	39,573	82–61	L1
144	September 8	@ Twins	5–2	**Clevinger** (11–2)	Dobnak (0–1)	**Hand** (34)	31,380	83–61	W1
145	September 9	@ Angels	6–2	**Bieber** (14–7)	Sandoval (0–3)	—	35,753	84–61	W2
146	September 10	@ Angels	8–0	**Plesac** (8–6)	Suárez (2–6)	—	35,508	85–61	W3
147	September 11	@ Angels	4–3	**Carrasco** (5–7)	Peters (3–3)	Cimber (1)	33,952	86–61	W4
—	September 13	Twins	Postponed (rain). Makeup date: September 14.						
148	September 14	Twins	0–2	Littell (5–0)	**Clevinger** (11–3)	Rogers (26)	24,258	86–62	L1
149	September 14	Twins	5–9	Graterol (1–0)	**Pérez** (2–3)	—	31,841	86–63	L2
150	September 15	Twins	7–5	**Wittgren** (5–1)	Romero (0–1)	**Pérez** (1)	26,414	87–63	W1
151	September 17	Tigers	7–2	**Plutko** (7–4)	Reininger (0–3)	—	19,108	88–63	W2
152	September 18	Tigers	2–1 (10)	**Cimber** (6–3)	Cisnero (0–4)	—	15,828	89–63	W3
153	September 19	Tigers	7–0	**Clevinger** (12–3)	Norris (3–13)	—	19,432	90–63	W4
154	September 20	Phillies	5–2	**Bieber** (15–7)	Smyly (4–7)	**Carrasco** (1)	26,329	91–63	W5
155	September 21	Phillies	4–9	Vargas (7–8)	**Pérez** (2–4)	—	32,791	91–64	L1
156	September 22	Phillies	10–1	**Carrasco** (6–7)	Velasquez (7–8)	—	25,309	92–64	W1
157	September 24	@ White Sox	11–0	**Clevinger** (13–3)	Fulmer (1–2)	—	13,940	93–64	W2
158	September 25	@ White Sox	3–8	Detwiler (3–5)	**Bieber** (15–8)	Colomé (30)	15,980	93–65	L1
159	September 26	@ White Sox	0–8	Osich (4–0)	**Civale** (3–4)	—	16,273	93–66	L2
160	September 27	@ Nationals	2–8	Voth (2–1)	**Goody** (3–2)	—	27,434	93–67	L3
161	September 28	@ Nationals	7–10	Corbin (15–7)	**Plutko** (7–5)	—	38,435	93–68	L4
162	September 29	@ Nationals	2–8	Ross (4-4)	**Clevinger** (13–4)	—	36,764	93–69	L5

Legend: = Win = Loss = Postponement
Bold = Indians team member

== Player stats ==
=== Batting ===
Note: G = Games played; AB = At bats; R = Runs scored; H = Hits; 2B = Doubles; 3B = Triples; HR = Home runs; RBI = Runs batted in; AVG = Batting average; SB = Stolen bases

Player	G	AB	R	H	2B	3B	HR	RBI	AVG	SB
Greg Allen	89	231	30	53	9	3	4	27	.229	8
Trevor Bauer	2	5	0	1	0	0	0	0	.200	0
Jake Bauers	117	372	46	84	16	1	12	43	.226	3
Shane Bieber	2	5	0	0	0	0	0	0	.000	0
Bobby Bradley	15	45	4	8	5	0	1	4	.178	0
Carlos Carrasco	1	0	0	0	0	0	0	0	—	0
Yu Chang	28	73	8	13	2	1	1	6	.178	0
Adam Cimber	5	0	0	0	0	0	0	0	—	0
Aaron Civale	1	2	0	0	0	0	0	0	.000	0
Mike Clevinger	1	2	0	0	0	0	0	0	.000	0
Tyler Clippard	2	0	0	0	0	0	0	0	—	0
Ryan Flaherty	14	21	4	3	2	0	0	1	.143	0
Mike Freeman	75	177	27	49	8	0	4	24	.277	1
Carlos Gonzalez	30	105	13	22	1	0	2	7	.210	0
Nick Goody	3	0	0	0	0	0	0	0	—	0
Eric Haase	10	16	1	1	0	0	1	3	.063	0
Brad Hand	2	0	0	0	0	0	0	0	—	0
James Hoyt	1	0	0	0	0	0	0	0	—	0
James Karinchak	1	0	0	0	0	0	0	0	—	0
Jason Kipnis	121	458	52	112	23	1	17	65	.245	7
Corey Kluber	1	1	0	0	0	0	0	0	.000	0
Francisco Lindor	143	598	101	170	40	2	32	74	.284	22
Jordan Luplow	85	225	42	62	15	1	15	38	.276	3
Leonys Martin	65	236	32	47	7	0	9	19	.199	4
Phil Maton	2	0	0	0	0	0	0	0	—	0
Oscar Mercado	115	438	70	118	25	3	15	54	.269	15
Brad Miller	13	36	4	9	3	0	1	4	.250	1
Max Moroff	20	32	3	4	1	0	1	4	.125	1
Tyler Naquin	89	274	34	79	19	0	10	34	.288	4
Tyler Olson	1	0	0	0	0	0	0	0	—	0
Dan Otero	3	0	0	0	0	0	0	0	—	0
Óliver Pérez	1	0	0	0	0	0	0	0	—	0
Roberto Perez	119	389	46	93	9	1	24	63	.239	0
Kevin Plawecki	59	158	13	35	10	0	3	17	.222	0
Zach Plesac	1	0	0	0	0	0	0	0	—	0
Adam Plutko	2	2	0	0	0	0	0	0	.000	0
Yasiel Puig	49	182	25	54	15	1	2	23	.297	5
Hanley Ramirez	16	49	4	9	1	0	2	8	.184	0
José Ramírez	129	482	68	123	33	3	23	83	.255	24
Neil Ramirez	1	0	0	0	0	0	0	0	—	0
Franmil Reyes	51	173	26	41	10	0	10	35	.237	0
Jefry Rodriguez	1	0	0	0	0	0	0	0	—	0
Carlos Santana	158	573	110	161	30	1	34	93	.281	4
Eric Stamets	15	41	4	2	1	0	0	2	.049	0
Andrew Velazquez	5	11	1	1	1	0	0	0	.091	1
Nick Wittgren	4	0	0	0	0	0	0	0	—	0
Hunter Wood	3	0	0	0	0	0	0	0	—	0
Bradley Zimmer	9	13	1	0	0	0	0	0	.000	0
Team totals	162	5425	769	1354	286	18	223	731	.250	103

=== Pitching ===
Note: W = Wins; L = Losses; ERA = Earned run average; G = Games pitched; GS = Games started; SV = Saves; IP = Innings pitched; H = Hits allowed; R = Total runs allowed; ER = Earned runs allowed; BB = Walks allowed; K = Strikeouts

Player	W	L	ERA	G	GS	SV	IP	H	R	ER	BB	SO
Logan Allen	0	0	0.00	1	0	0	2.1	3	0	0	0	3
Cody Anderson	0	1	9.35	5	2	0	8.2	12	9	9	8	9
Trevor Bauer	9	8	3.79	24	24	0	156.2	127	76	66	63	185
Shane Bieber	15	8	3.28	34	33	0	214.1	186	86	78	40	259
Carlos Carrasco	6	7	5.29	23	12	1	80.0	92	48	47	16	96
Adam Cimber	6	3	4.45	68	0	1	56.2	56	29	28	19	41
Aaron Civale	3	4	2.34	10	10	0	57.2	44	18	15	16	46
Mike Clevinger	13	4	2.71	21	21	0	126.0	96	38	38	37	169
Tyler Clippard	1	0	2.90	53	3	0	62.0	38	20	20	15	64
A.J. Cole	3	1	3.81	25	0	1	26.0	31	16	11	8	30
Jon Edwards	2	0	2.25	9	0	0	8.0	5	2	2	6	5
Mike Freeman	0	0	9.00	1	0	0	2.0	2	2	2	0	0
Nick Goody	3	2	3.54	39	0	0	40.2	30	18	16	22	50
Brad Hand	6	4	3.30	60	0	34	57.1	53	21	21	18	84
James Hoyt	0	0	2.16	8	0	0	8.1	6	2	2	2	10
James Karinchak	0	0	1.69	5	0	0	5.1	3	1	1	1	8
Corey Kluber	2	3	5.80	7	7	0	35.2	44	26	23	15	38
Phil Maton	0	0	2.92	9	0	0	12.1	4	5	4	6	13
Tyler Olson	1	1	4.40	39	0	0	30.2	34	15	15	16	28
Dan Otero	0	0	4.85	25	0	0	29.2	42	17	16	3	16
Óliver Pérez	2	4	3.98	67	0	1	40.2	38	20	18	12	48
Kevin Plawecki	0	0	0.00	2	0	0	2.0	0	0	0	0	0
Zach Plesac	8	6	3.81	21	21	0	115.2	102	52	49	40	88
Adam Plutko	7	5	4.86	21	20	0	109.1	115	61	59	26	78
Neil Ramírez	0	1	5.40	16	0	0	16.2	18	11	10	9	18
Jefry Rodríguez	1	5	4.63	10	8	0	46.2	48	26	24	21	33
Danny Salazar	0	1	4.50	1	1	0	4.0	4	2	2	3	2
Josh Smith	0	0	5.40	8	0	0	8.1	8	5	5	8	12
Nick Wittgren	5	1	2.81	55	0	4	57.2	47	22	18	15	60
Hunter Wood	0	0	3.86	17	0	0	16.1	20	9	7	5	15
Team totals	93	69	3.76	162	162	42	1437.2	1308	657	601	450	1508

== Awards and honors ==
All-Star Game

- Carlos Santana, First Base, Starter
- Francisco Lindor, SS, Reserve
- Shane Bieber, Pitcher, Reserve

== Farm system ==
Level	Team	League	Manager
AAA	Columbus Clippers	International League	Tony Mansolino
AA	Akron RubberDucks	Eastern League	
A-Advanced	Lynchburg Hillcats	Carolina League	
A	Lake County Captains	Midwest League	
A-Short Season	Mahoning Valley Scrappers	New York–Penn League	
Rookie	AZL Indians	Arizona League	
Rookie	DSL Indians	Dominican Summer League	
Rookie	DSL Indians / Brewers	Dominican Summer League	

== See also ==
- List of Cleveland Indians team records
