= Jordan Milbrath =

American baseball player (born 1991)

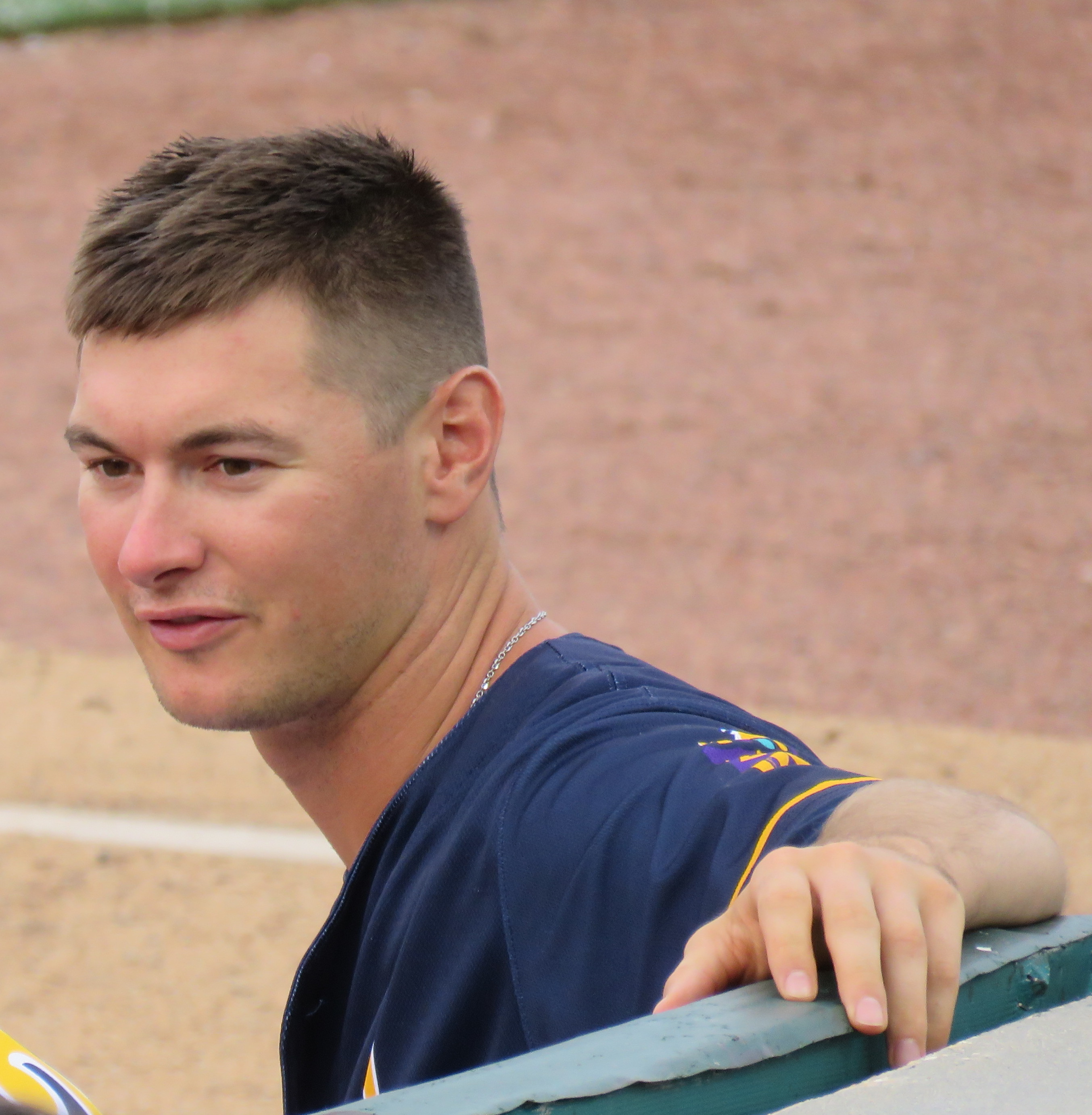
- Pitcher
- Born: August 1, 1991 (age 34); Springfield, Minnesota, U.S.
- Bats: Right Throws: Right
- Stats at Baseball Reference

Jordan Milbrath (born August 1, 1991) is an American former professional baseball pitcher.

== Career ==
Milbrath graduated from Springfield High School in Springfield, Minnesota. He attended Augustana University, where he played college baseball for the Augustana Vikings, and he played collegiate summer baseball for the Rochester Honkers of the Northwoods League.

=== Cleveland Indians ===
The Cleveland Indians selected Milbrath in the 35th round, with the 1,041st selection, of the 2013 MLB draft. He signed and made his professional debut that year with the Rookie-league Arizona League Indians where he was 1–1 with a 4.87 ERA in 20 1/3 relief innings pitched. He also pitched in one game for the Lake County Captains of the Single–A Midwest League at the end of the season.

Milbrath pitched for Lake County in both 2014, where he was 3–12 with a 3.95 ERA in 26 games (23 starts), and in 2015, where he compiled a 7–11 record and a 4.54 ERA in 27 games (26 starts). He also pitched in the Arizona Fall League.

Milbrath spent the 2016 season with the Lynchburg Hillcats of the High–A Carolina League where he pitched to a 3–5 record with a 5.43 ERA in 41 relief appearances. He also pitched one game with the Akron RubberDucks of the Double–A Eastern League at the end of the season. He began the 2017 season with Lynchburg, where he was taught to pitch sidearm, before receiving a midseason promotion to Akron. He made 15 relief appearances for both teams. Pitching sidearm, Milbrath's earned run average decreased from 5.43 in 2016 to 3.02 in 2017, and he also decreased his walks per nine innings pitched from 5.3 to 3.3.

On December 14, 2017, the Pittsburgh Pirates selected Milbrath from the Indians organization in the Rule 5 draft. He competed for a spot on Pittsburgh's 2018 Opening Day 25-man roster, but was waived and returned to Cleveland before the start of the regular season. He began the season with Akron.

=== Miami Marlins ===
On February 4, 2019, Milbrath was traded to the Miami Marlins in exchange for Nick Wittgren. Milbrath split the season between the Triple-A New Orleans Baby Cakes and the Double-A Jacksonville Jumbo Shrimp, pitching to a 2–3 record and 3.84 ERA with 72 strikeouts in 65 2/3 innings pitched across 36 cumulative appearances. He elected free agency following the season on November 4.

=== Arizona Diamondbacks ===
On January 20, 2020, Milbrath signed a minor league contract with the Arizona Diamondbacks. He did not play in a game in 2020 due to the cancellation of the minor league season because of the COVID-19 pandemic. On May 22, Milbrath was released by the Diamondbacks organization.

=== Minnesota Twins ===
On May 14, 2021, Milbrath signed a minor league contract with the Minnesota Twins. He appeared in six games for the Double-A Wichita Wind Surge, but struggled to a 10.00 ERA with 12 strikeouts in nine innings pitched. Milbrath was released by the Twins organization on July 14.

== Personal life ==
Milbrath worked a temp job for NFL Films at Super Bowl LII.

== See also ==
- Rule 5 draft results
