= Jefry Rodríguez =

Dominican baseball player (born 1993)

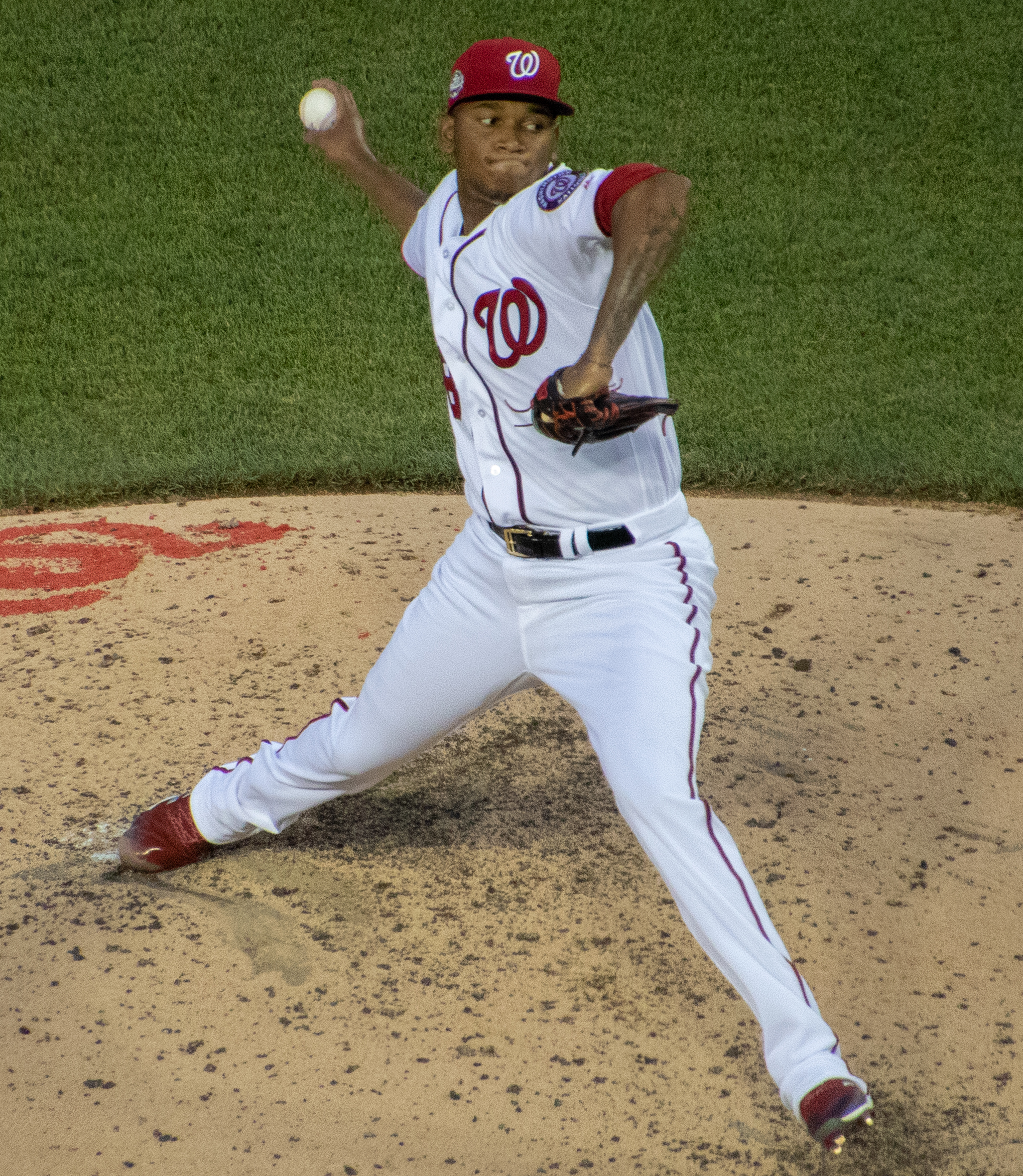
- Rodríguez with the Nationals 2018
- Pitcher
- Born: July 26, 1993 (age 33); Haina, Dominican Republic
- Batted: Right Threw: Right

MLB debut
- June 3, 2018, for the Washington Nationals

Last MLB appearance
- August 22, 2021, for the Washington Nationals

MLB statistics
- Win–loss record: 4–8
- Earned run average: 5.34
- Strikeouts: 92
- Stats at Baseball Reference

Teams
- Washington Nationals (2018); Cleveland Indians (2019); Washington Nationals (2021)

Jefry Osvaldo Rodríguez (born July 26, 1993) is a Dominican former professional baseball pitcher. He played in Major League Baseball (MLB) for the Washington Nationals and Cleveland Indians.

== Career ==
=== Washington Nationals ===
Rodríguez grew up in the Dominican Republic playing shortstop, but he became a pitcher at age 18, shortly before the Nationals signed him in 2012. He began his professional career in 2012 with 10 games for the Dominican Summer League Nationals in the rookie-league-level Dominican Summer League, starting nine of them and posting a record of 0–2 and an earned run average (ERA) of 2.93 with 35 strikeouts and 33 walks in 43 innings pitched.

Rodríguez spent 2013 in the rookie-league-level Gulf Coast League with the Gulf Coast League Nationals, who that year finished their regular season with a record of 49–9, giving them the highest winning percentage (.845) for a full regular season ever achieved by a minor-league baseball team based in the United States. The team then won all three of its playoff games, defeating the Gulf Coast League Pirates in a single-game semifinal playoff and sweeping the Gulf Coast League Red Sox in the best-of-three league championship series, to become the 2013 Gulf Coast League champions. During the season, Rodríguez made 12 appearances, all starts, and went 3–0 with an ERA of 2.45, 43 strikeouts, and 20 walks in 47 2/3 innings of work.

Rodríguez began the 2014 season with a promotion to the Hagerstown Suns in the Single-A South Atlantic League. He appeared in four games for the Suns, starting all four of them, and posted an ERA of 6.88 and a record of 0–2 with 11 strikeouts and five walks in 17 innings. Demoted to play for the Auburn Doubledays in the Low-A New York-Penn League in mid-June, Rodríguez had more success at the lower level, going 1–0 with an ERA of 2.76 in three games, all of which he started, with nine strikeouts and four walks over the 17 1/3 innings he pitched. Overall, he went 1–2 in seven games in 2014, with an ERA of 4.86, 20 walks, and nine strikeouts over 33 1/3 innings.

In 2015, Rodríguez again was promoted to Hagerstown, but later was sent back down to Auburn again for remedial work. In mid-July 2015, while he pitched for Auburn, the New York–Penn League honored him as its Pitcher of the Week. He returned to Hagerstown near the end of the season. All his appearances in 2015 were starts. He finished 2015 having gone 3–5 with a 4.59 ERA, 67 strikeouts, and 33 walks over 68 2/3 innings in 13 games for Auburn, 1–5 with a 6.75 ERA, 27 strikeouts, and 25 walks over 42 2/3 innings in 10 games for Hagerstown, and 4–10 with a 5.42 ERA, 94 strikeouts, and 58 walks over 111 1/3 innings in 23 games overall. Rodríguez spent the entire 2016 season with Hagerstown. He appeared in 25 games, starting all of them, and had one complete game, the first of his professional career. He finished the year with a record of 7–11, a 4.96 ERA, 96 strikeouts, and 52 walks over 123 1/3 innings pitched.

Rodríguez played for the Potomac Nationals in the High-A Carolina League in 2017, and the Carolina League named him its Pitcher of the Week for the first week of May. He began the season by posting a 3–2 record and a 3.51 ERA, with a strikeout-to-walk ratio of almost four-to-one, and he held opposing batters to a .228 batting average. On May 16, 2017, however, he received an 80-game suspension after testing positive for a metabolite of Clomiphene, classified by the league as a prohibited performance-enhancing drug. The Washington Post noted the rarity of the suspension for the Nationals, reporting that he was the team's only "prominent" minor-league player to be suspended for performance-enhancing drugs over the previous five years. He returned to action with Potomac after serving his suspension, and in 2017 overall he made 12 appearances, 10 of them starts, posted a record of 4–3 and an ERA of 3.32, struck out 51, and walked 19 in the 57 innings pitched. During the 2017 National League Division Series, Rodríguez was among a few pitching prospects the Nationals brought up to provide live pitching in a simulated game for the team's major-league hitters.

The Nationals added Rodríguez to their 40-man roster after the 2017 season. In a preseason listing before the start of the 2018 season, MLB Pipeline ranked Rodríguez as the Nationals' 17th-best prospect and suggested he could end up in a late-inning bullpen role. He began the 2018 season with a promotion to the Harrisburg Senators of the Double-A Eastern League. The Nationals called him up to the major leagues for the first time on May 19, placing him on their roster as their 26th man on the day of a doubleheader with the Los Angeles Dodgers at Nationals Park in Washington, D.C. He saw no action, and the Nationals optioned him back to Harrisburg on May 20.

Rodríguez had appeared in 11 games for Harrisburg, all of them starts, in 2018, posting a record of 4–3 with a 3.88 ERA, 60 strikeouts, and 23 walks in 58 innings, when the Nationals called him up again on June 3. He made his major-league debut that day, entering in relief against the Atlanta Braves at Suntrust Park in Atlanta, Georgia, after Nationals starter Jeremy Hellickson exited the game with a leg injury in the bottom of the first inning after pitching only one-third of an inning. He threw his first major-league warm-up pitches on the mound in front of the Atlanta crowd, then faced Braves star first baseman Freddie Freeman as his first major-league opponent and got Freeman to foul out to third baseman Anthony Rendon on his first pitch. On his next pitch, he gave up a single to Braves right fielder Nick Markakis which allowed a runner he inherited from Hellickson to score an unearned run, but he went on to pitch 4 2/3 innings, giving up no other runs and scattering four hits while striking out three Braves and walking two. The first strikeout victim of his career was Braves catcher Kurt Suzuki, whom he struck out twice during the game. The Nationals optioned Rodríguez back to Harrisburg on June 4 before he could make another major-league appearance.

Rodríguez had made 13 starts and pitched 68 innings for Harrisburg during the season, posting a 3.31 ERA for the Senators with 72 strikeouts and 28 walks, when on June 19 the Nationals recalled him to make his second career MLB appearance, first MLB start, and first appearance at Nationals Park in Washington, D.C., in that evening's Beltway Series game against the Baltimore Orioles.

=== Cleveland Indians ===
On November 30, 2018, Rodríguez was traded to the Cleveland Indians, along with minor leaguer Daniel Johnson and a player to be named later (revealed to be Andruw Monasterio), for Yan Gomes.

With the 2019 Cleveland Indians, Rodríguez appeared in 10 games, compiling a 1–5 record with 4.63 ERA and 46.2 strikeouts in 33.0 innings pitched. Rodríguez did not appear for the Indians in the 2020 season.

The Indians declined to tender Rodríguez a contract for the 2021 season on December 2, 2020, making him a free agent.

=== Washington Nationals (second stint) ===
On December 22, 2020, Rodríguez signed a minor league contract with his former team, the Washington Nationals, that included an invitation to 2021 spring training. He was assigned to the Triple-A Rochester Red Wings to being the 2021 season, posting a 7.56 ERA in 6 appearances. On June 12, 2021, Rodríguez was selected to the active roster. He appeared in 14 games for the Nationals. Posting a 5.92 ERA with 20 strikeouts. On August 24, Rodríguez was designated for assignment by the Nationals. On August 26, Rodríguez cleared waivers and was assigned outright to Triple-A Rochester. Rodríguez became a free agent following the season, but re-signed with the Nationals on a minor league deal on November 8, 2021.

Rodríguez spent the 2022 season with Triple-A Rochester. Pitching in 24 games (11 starts), he struggled to a 7.49 ERA with 67 strikeouts in 63 2/3 innings pitched. He elected free agency following the season on November 10, 2022.
