= Nick Goody =

American baseball player (born 1991)

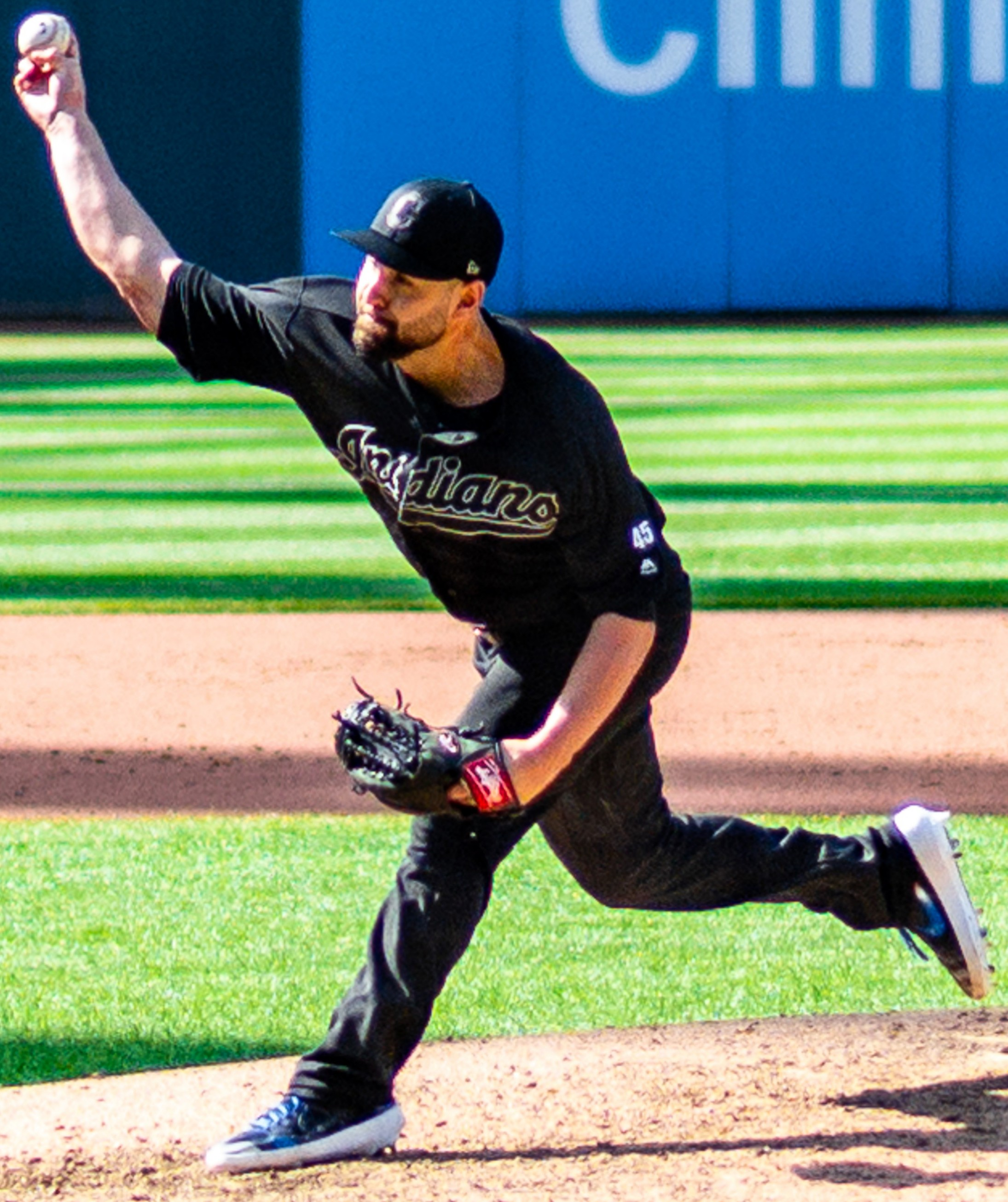
- Goody with the Cleveland Indians in 2019
- Pitcher
- Born: July 6, 1991 (age 34); Orlando, Florida, U.S.
- Batted: Right Threw: Right

MLB debut
- July 30, 2015, for the New York Yankees

Last MLB appearance
- September 23, 2020, for the Texas Rangers

MLB statistics
- Win–loss record: 4–8
- Earned run average: 4.19
- Strikeouts: 184
- Stats at Baseball Reference

Teams
- New York Yankees (2015–2016); Cleveland Indians (2017–2019); Texas Rangers (2020)

Nicholas Gunnar Goody (born July 6, 1991) is an American former professional baseball pitcher. He played in Major League Baseball (MLB) for the New York Yankees, Cleveland Indians, and Texas Rangers.

== Amateur career ==
Goody attended University High School in Orlando, Florida. He played for the school's baseball team as a shortstop. He enrolled at State College of Florida, Manatee–Sarasota to play college baseball, and the team's head coach suggested he become a pitcher. As a freshman, he served as the team's closer. That summer, Goody pitched for the Winter Park Diamond Dawgs of the Florida Collegiate Summer League, and was named most valuable player of the league's championship game. As a sophomore, Goody played as a starting pitcher, and had a 6–2 win–loss record, 1.29 earned run average (ERA), and struck out 114 batters in 84 innings pitched, including 19 strikeouts in one game. He was named the Suncoast Conference Pitcher of the Year as a sophomore.

The New York Yankees selected Goody in the 22nd round of the 2011 Major League Baseball (MLB) draft, but Goody opted not to sign. He played collegiate summer baseball in the Northwoods League for the Mankato Moondogs to focus on the mentality of closing. In 2012, Goody transferred to Louisiana State University (LSU) in order to play for the LSU Tigers baseball team. Nick Rumbelow began the season as LSU's closer, but Goody assumed the role during the season, finishing with 11 saves, third most in the Southeastern Conference.

== Professional career ==
=== New York Yankees ===
The Yankees selected Goody with their sixth round pick, the 217th overall selection, of the 2012 MLB draft. That same year, he pitched for the Staten Island Yankees of the Low–A New York–Penn League, the Charleston RiverDogs of the Single–A South Atlantic League, and the Tampa Yankees of the High–A Florida State League. He had a 1.12 ERA and seven saves in 23 games.

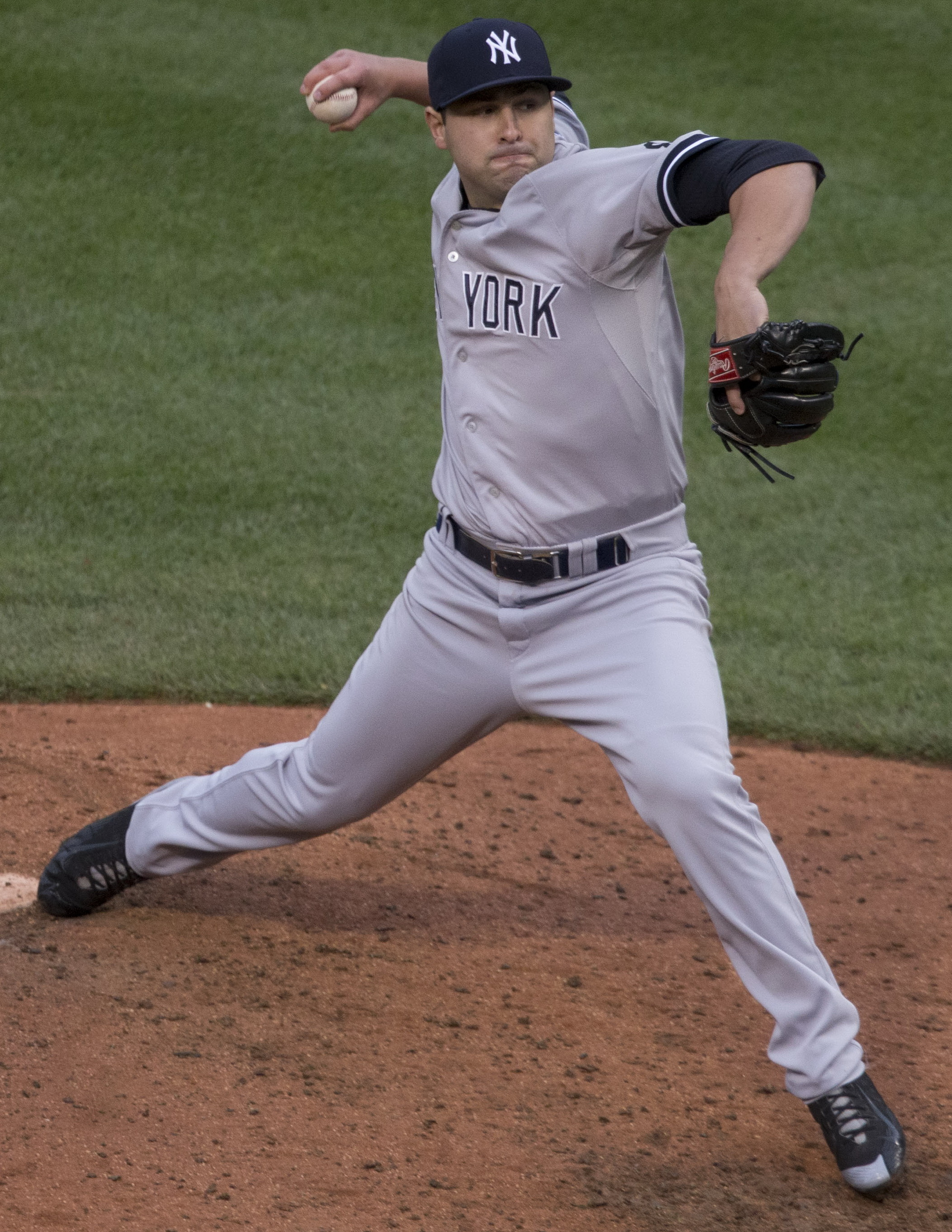
Goody with the New York Yankees in 2015

In 2013, the Yankees invited Goody to spring training. Goody suffered a sprained ankle when he was involved in a multi-vehicle car accident. He began the season with Tampa, but underwent Tommy John surgery to repair the ulnar collateral ligament of the elbow in his pitching arm, which he injured in his second appearance of the season. He returned to Tampa on May 6, 2014, and was promoted to the Trenton Thunder of the Double–A Eastern League in June. The Yankees invited Goody to spring training in 2015, but reassigned him to minor league camp in mid-March. Goody began the 2015 season with Trenton, and was named to the Eastern League All-Star Game. He was promoted to the Scranton/Wilkes-Barre RailRiders of the Triple–A International League in July, and Brady Lail replaced him in the All-Star Game.

On July 25, the Yankees promoted Goody to the major leagues. He was optioned back to Scranton/Wilkes-Barre on July 28, without having made any major league appearances. The Yankees recalled him on July 30 due to an injury to Michael Pineda. He made his major league debut that day. Goody spent the season moving between Triple-A and the majors. He pitched to a 4.75 ERA in seven games that year.

Goody started the 2016 season in the RailRiders' bullpen. He was first called up on April 22 and was optioned on June 26, then spent the remainder of the season moving between Triple-A and the majors. On December 15, 2016, Goody was designated for assignment by the Yankees.

=== Cleveland Indians ===
The Yankees subsequently traded Goody to the Cleveland Indians on December 20, 2016, in exchange for either a player to be named later or cash considerations. Goody learned about the trade while he was on his honeymoon in St. Lucia.

After pitching 4.2 innings at Triple-A to start the 2017 season, Goody was promoted to the big leagues on April 14. He became a reliable reliever in Cleveland's bullpen by logging a 2.80 ERA with 72 strikeouts in 54 2/3 innings. On October 3, it was announced that he would not be included on the Indians' 25-man roster for the ALDS. Goody made the Indians opening day roster in 2018. He appeared in 12 games for Cleveland, posting a 6.94 ERA before being placed on the disabled list with an elbow injury on May 3. He ultimately missed the rest of the season after suffering a setback in August.

Goody began the 2019 season with the Columbus Clippers of the International League. He was promoted on June 5 and pitched to a 3.45 ERA with 50 strikeouts in 40 2/3 innings over 39 games. He did not allow a run between June 25 and August 11. Goody was designated for assignment by the Indians on November 20, 2019.

=== Texas Rangers ===
On November 26, 2019, Goody was claimed off of release waivers by the Texas Rangers. As Goody had more than three years of service time, he had the option to accept the assignment or refuse and become a free agent. On December 2, Goody accepted the Rangers claim and was added to their roster.

He was included in the Rangers' 60-man player pool for the COVID-19 shortened 2020 season and made the opening day roster. In 2020, Goody recorded a 9.00 ERA, issuing eight walks and allowing 11 runs in as many innings. He missed time in August to back spasms. On September 24, 2020, Goody was designated for assignment, and was outrighted to the Rangers alternate training site on September 28. He elected free agency the following day.

=== New York Yankees (second stint) ===
On February 13, 2021, Goody signed a minor league contract with the New York Yankees for the 2021 season, receiving a non-roster invitation to spring training. He started the season with the Scranton/Wilkes-Barre RailRiders. After posting a 2.86 ERA in 17 games, Goody was released by the Yankees on July 4.

=== Washington Nationals ===
On July 6, 2021, Goody signed a minor league contract with the Washington Nationals organization and was assigned to the Triple-A Rochester Red Wings. After pitching to a 5.14 ERA in 14 innings, the Nationals released Goody on August 15.

=== New York Yankees (third stint) ===
On August 17, 2021, Goody once again signed a minor league contract with the New York Yankees. In 28 total appearances for the Triple-A Scranton/Wilkes-Barre RailRiders, he compiled a 4-3 record and 4.28 ERA with 46 strikeouts across 33 2/3 innings pitched. Goody elected free agency following the season on November 7.

=== Acereros de Monclova ===
On April 20, 2022, Goody signed with the Acereros de Monclova of the Mexican League. In 14 games for Monclova, he posted a 2-1 record and 2.40 ERA with 24 strikeouts and 2 saves across 15 innings of relief. Goody was released by the Acereros on June 5.

=== Long Island Ducks ===
On June 6, 2022, Goody signed with the Long Island Ducks of the Atlantic League of Professional Baseball. In 15 appearances for the Ducks, he logged an 0-2 record and 4.20 ERA with 24 strikeouts and 5 saves over 15 innings of work. Goody became a free agent following the season.
