= Nick Wittgren =

American baseball player (born 1991)

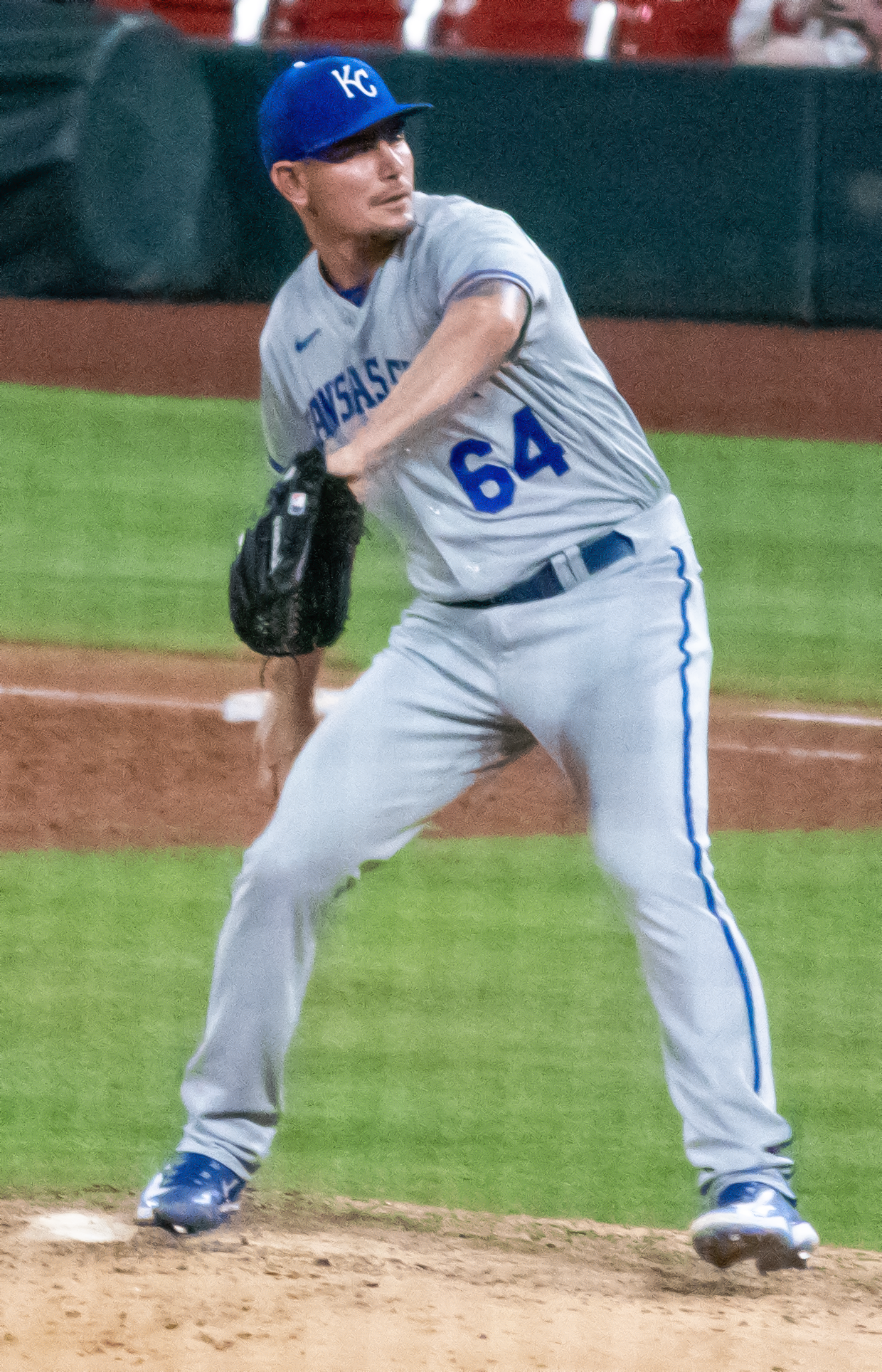
- Wittgren with the Kansas City Royals
- Pitcher
- Born: May 29, 1991 (age 35); Torrance, California, U.S.
- Batted: Right Threw: Right

MLB debut
- April 19, 2016, for the Miami Marlins

Last MLB appearance
- August 14, 2023, for the Kansas City Royals

MLB statistics
- Win–loss record: 20–15
- Earned run average: 4.04
- Strikeouts: 300
- Stats at Baseball Reference

Teams
- Miami Marlins (2016–2018); Cleveland Indians (2019–2021); St. Louis Cardinals (2022); Kansas City Royals (2023)

Nicholas James Wittgren (born May 29, 1991) is an American former professional baseball pitcher. He played in Major League Baseball (MLB) for the Miami Marlins, Cleveland Indians, St. Louis Cardinals, and Kansas City Royals.

== Amateur career ==
Wittgren was born in Torrance, California, but grew up in Lafayette, Indiana where he attended McCutcheon High School and played for the school's baseball, basketball, and tennis teams. Wittgren played college baseball at Parkland College for a year before transferring to Purdue University where he played from 2011 to 2012. He served as the closer for Purdue during his two years, finishing with a 2.54 earned run average (ERA), 22 saves and 94 strikeouts over 92 innings pitched. In 2011, he played collegiate summer baseball with the Hyannis Harbor Hawks of the Cape Cod Baseball League.

== Professional career ==
=== Miami Marlins ===
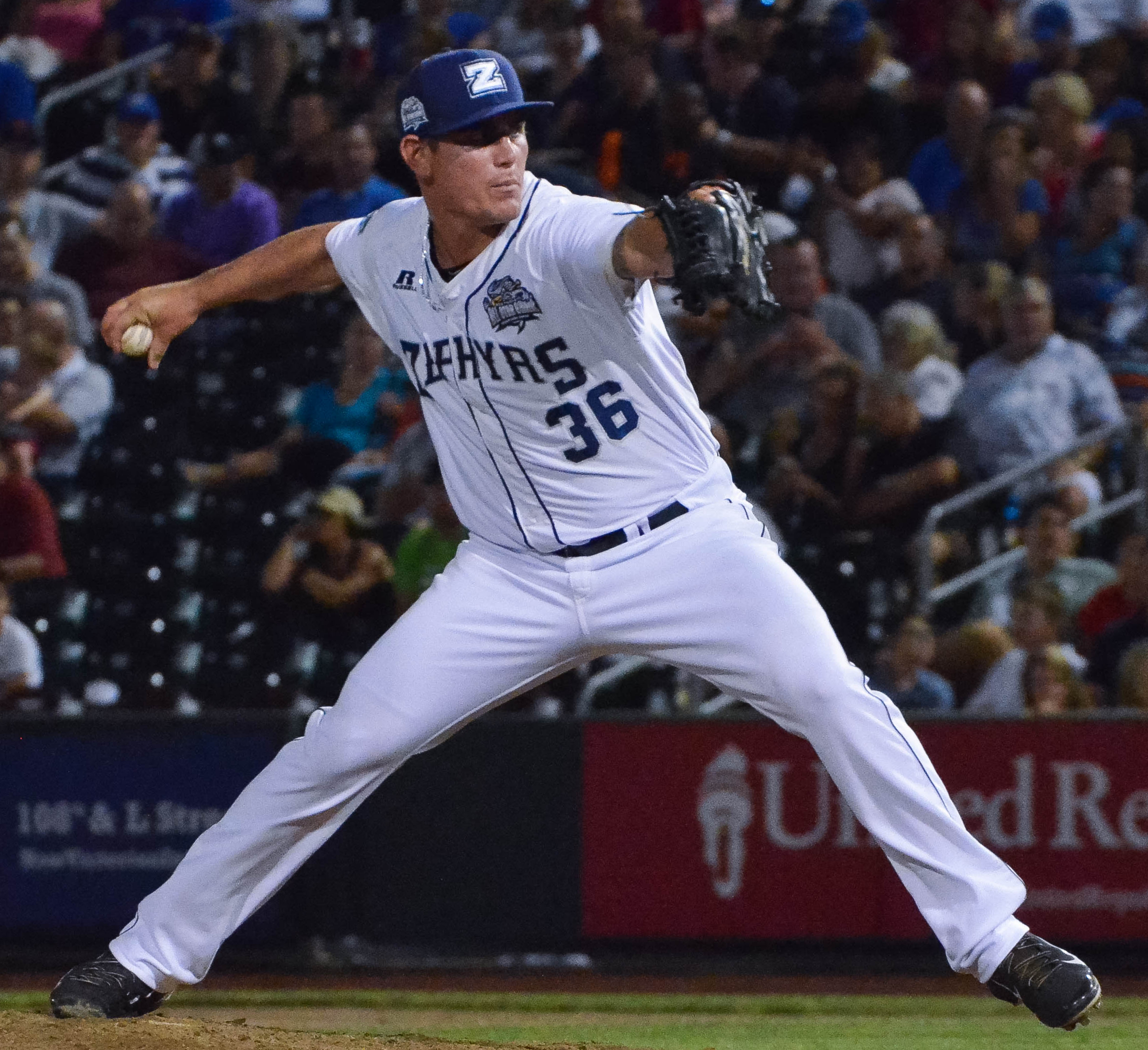
Wittgren with the Zephyrs in 2015

Wittgren was drafted by the Miami Marlins in the ninth round of the 2012 Major League Baseball draft. During his first professional season he had a 1.17 ERA, 13 saves and 47 strikeouts over 30 2/3 innings while playing for the Jamestown Jammers and Greensboro Grasshoppers. He started the 2013 season with the Jupiter Hammerheads and was promoted to the Double-A Jacksonville Suns. For the season he posted a 0.77 ERA with 26 saves and 63 strikeouts over 58 1/3. At the end of the season he was named the Minor League Relief Pitcher of the Year by the staff of MiLB.com. Wittgren returned to Jacksonville in 2014. He appeared in 52 games and had a 3.55 ERA, 20 saves and 56 strikeouts over 66 innings. He again returned to Jacksonville to start 2015, but was promoted to the Triple-A New Orleans Zephyrs after two games.

The Marlins promoted Wittgren to the major leagues on April 19, 2016. In his first Major League appearance, he walked the only batter he faced, Anthony Rendon. Rendon later scored on Bryce Harper's grand slam. He spent most of the season in the Marlins bullpen, appearing in 48 games. He had a 3.14 ERA in 51 2/3 innings. The next season he spent time between the Triple–A level and the Marlins bullpen, appearing in 38 games with a 4.68 ERA in 42 1/3 innings. Wittgren was designated for assignment on January 29, 2019, following the signing of Neil Walker.

=== Cleveland Indians ===
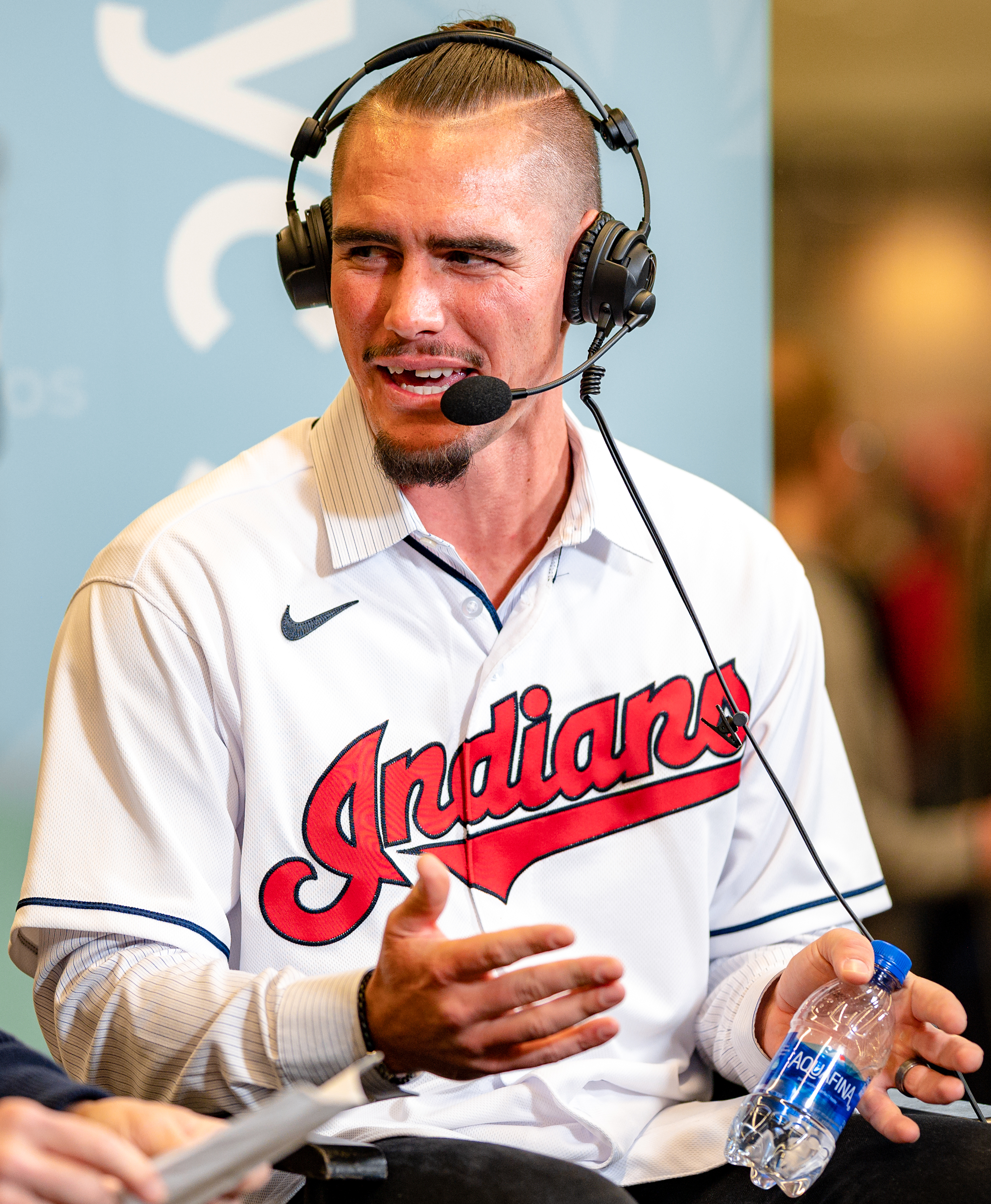
Wittgren with the Cleveland Indians

On February 4, 2019, Wittgren was traded to the Cleveland Indians in exchange for Jordan Milbrath. On March 24, 2019, Wittgren was optioned to the Triple–A Columbus Clippers. On April 9, 2019, he was called up to the Indians after Mike Clevinger went to the 10-day IL.

With the 2020 Cleveland Indians, Wittgren appeared in 25 games, compiling a 2–0 record with 3.42 ERA and 28 strikeouts in 23.2 innings pitched.

Wittgren made 60 appearances in 2021, posting a 5.05 ERA and 61 strikeouts.

On November 5, 2021, the Indians outrighted Wittgren off their 40-man roster; Wittgren subsequently elected free agency.

=== St. Louis Cardinals ===
On March 13, 2022, Wittgren signed a one-year contract with the St. Louis Cardinals. After recording a 5.90 ERA in a team-leading 29 appearances for the Cardinals, Wittgren was designated for assignment on July 2. Wittgren was released on July 9.

=== Kansas City Royals ===
On December 23, 2022, Wittgren signed a minor league contract with the Kansas City Royals. He was assigned to the Triple-A Omaha Storm Chasers to begin the 2023 season, making 17 appearances and registering a 1.25 ERA with 19 strikeouts and five saves in 21 2/3 innings pitched. On May 23, Wittgren's contract was selected to the active roster. In 27 games for the Royals, he logged a 4.97 ERA with 18 strikeouts in 29.0 innings of work. On August 16, he was optioned to Triple–A Omaha following the promotion of John McMillon. Rather than accepting the assignment, Wittgren instead elected free agency.

=== Seattle Mariners ===
On August 19, 2023, Wittgren signed a minor league contract with the Seattle Mariners. In 12 appearances out of the bullpen for the Triple–A Tacoma Rainiers, he struggled to a 7.90 ERA with 10 strikeouts across 13 2/3 innings pitched. Wittgren elected free agency following the season on November 6.

=== Minnesota Twins ===
On April 26, 2024, Wittgren signed a minor league contract with the Minnesota Twins. In 40 appearance split between the Double–A Wichita Wind Surge and Triple–A St. Paul Saints, he posted a combined 2–3 record and 5.58 ERA with 52 strikeouts across 59 2/3 innings pitched. Wittgren was released by the Twins organization on September 16.

Wittgren officially announced his retirement from baseball on March 22, 2025.

== International career ==
Wittgren was selected to represent Germany at the 2023 World Baseball Classic qualification.

== Coaching career ==
On February 4, 2026, Wittgren was hired to serve as the pitching coach for the Columbus Clippers, the Triple-A affiliate of the Cleveland Guardians.

== Personal life ==
Wittgren and his wife, Ashley, have two sons together. They met in 2011 while Wittgren was playing in the Cape Cod Baseball League, where Ashley worked. She has a master's degree in strength and conditioning, and is Wittgren's personal trainer during the off-season.
