= 2018 Minnesota Twins season =

2018 Minnesota Twins
- League: American League
- Division: Central
- Ballpark: Target Field
- City: Minneapolis, Minnesota
- Record: 78–84 (.481)
- Divisional place: 2nd
- Owners: Jim Pohlad
- President of baseball operations: Derek Falvey
- General managers: Thad Levine
- Managers: Paul Molitor
- Television: Fox Sports North (Dick Bremer, Bert Blyleven, Torii Hunter)
- Radio: WCCO (Cory Provus, Dan Gladden)
- Stats: ESPN.com; Baseball Reference

The 2018 Minnesota Twins season was the 58th season for the Minnesota Twins franchise in the Twin Cities of Minnesota, their ninth season at Target Field and the 118th overall in the American League. The Twins began the season on March 29 on the road against the Baltimore Orioles and ended the season at home against the Chicago White Sox. The Twins finished the 2018 season at 78–84, 13 games out of first place in a weak American League Central. The record led to the firing of manager Paul Molitor the day after the season ended. Also, this season would prove to be the 15th and final season for career Twin Joe Mauer, who retired following the season.

== Regular season ==
=== Season standings ===
AL Central
Team	W	L	Pct.	GB	Home	Road
Cleveland Indians	91	71	.562	—	49‍–‍32	42‍–‍39
Minnesota Twins	78	84	.481	13	49‍–‍32	29‍–‍52
Detroit Tigers	64	98	.395	27	38‍–‍43	26‍–‍55
Chicago White Sox	62	100	.383	29	30‍–‍51	32‍–‍49
Kansas City Royals	58	104	.358	33	32‍–‍49	26‍–‍55

Division leaders
Team	W	L	Pct.
Boston Red Sox	108	54	.667
Houston Astros	103	59	.636
Cleveland Indians	91	71	.562

Wild Card teams (Top 2 teams qualify for postseason)
Team	W	L	Pct.	GB
New York Yankees	100	62	.617	+3
Oakland Athletics	97	65	.599	—
Tampa Bay Rays	90	72	.556	7
Seattle Mariners	89	73	.549	8
Los Angeles Angels	80	82	.494	17
Minnesota Twins	78	84	.481	19
Toronto Blue Jays	73	89	.451	24
Texas Rangers	67	95	.414	30
Detroit Tigers	64	98	.395	33
Chicago White Sox	62	100	.383	35
Kansas City Royals	58	104	.358	39
Baltimore Orioles	47	115	.290	50

=== Record vs. opponents ===
2018 American League record Source: MLB Standings Grid – 2018
Team	BAL	BOS	CWS	CLE	DET	HOU	KC	LAA	MIN	NYY	OAK	SEA	TB	TEX	TOR	NL
Baltimore	—	3–16	3–4	2–5	2–4	1–6	2–4	1–5	1–6	7–12	1–5	1–6	8–11	3–4	5–14	7–13
Boston	16–3	—	3–4	3–4	4–2	3–4	5–1	6–0	4–3	10–9	2–4	4–3	11–8	6–1	15–4	16–4
Chicago	4–3	4–3	—	5–14	7–12	0–7	11–8	2–5	7–12	2–4	2–5	2–4	4–2	4–3	2–4	6–14
Cleveland	5–2	4–3	14–5	—	13–6	3–4	12–7	3–3	10–9	2–5	2–4	2–5	2–4	4–2	3–4	12–8
Detroit	4–2	2–4	12–7	6–13	—	1–5	8–11	3–4	7–12	3–4	0–7	3–4	2–4	3–4	4–3	6–14
Houston	6–1	4–3	7–0	4–3	5–1	—	5–1	13–6	4–2	2–5	12–7	9–10	3–4	12–7	4–2	13–7
Kansas City	4–2	1–5	8–11	7–12	11–8	1–5	—	1–6	10–9	2–5	2–5	1–5	0–7	2–5	2–5	6–14
Los Angeles	5–1	0–6	5–2	3–3	4–3	6–13	6–1	—	4–3	1–5	10–9	8–11	1–6	13–6	4–3	10–10
Minnesota	6–1	3–4	12–7	9–10	12–7	2–4	9–10	3–4	—	2–5	2–5	1–5	3–4	2–4	4–2	8–12
New York	12–7	9–10	4–2	5–2	4–3	5–2	5–2	5–1	5–2	—	3–3	5–1	10–9	4–3	13–6	11–9
Oakland	5–1	4–2	5–2	4–2	7–0	7–12	5–2	9–10	5–2	3–3	—	9–10	2–5	13–6	7–0	12–8
Seattle	6–1	3–4	4–2	5–2	4–3	10–9	5–1	11–8	5–1	1–5	10–9	—	6–1	10–9	3–4	6–14
Tampa Bay	11–8	8–11	2–4	4–2	4–2	4–3	7–0	6–1	4–3	9–10	5–2	1–6	—	5–1	13–6	7–13
Texas	4–3	1–6	3–4	2–4	4–3	7–12	5–2	6–13	4–2	3–4	6–13	9–10	1–5	—	3–3	9–11
Toronto	14–5	4–15	4–2	4–3	3–4	2–4	5–2	3–4	2–4	6–13	0–7	4–3	6–13	3–3	—	13–7

== Roster ==
2018 Minnesota Twins
Roster
Pitchers: 38 Matt Belisle; 17 José Berríos; 67 Alan Busenitz; 27 John Curtiss; 61 Chase De Jong; 32 Oliver Drake; 21 Tyler Duffey; 32 Zach Duke; 44 Kyle Gibson; 59 Stephen Gonsalves; 53 David Hale; 39 Trevor Hildenberger; 45 Phil Hughes; 61 Tyler Kinley; 52 Zack Littell; 31 Lance Lynn; 68 Matt Magill; 65 Trevor May; 49 Adalberto Mejía; 58 Gabriel Moya; 12 Jake Odorizzi; 57 Ryan Pressly; 43 Addison Reed; 56 Fernando Rodney; 55 Taylor Rogers; 77 Fernando Romero; 54 Ervin Santana; 50 Aaron Slegers; 53 Kohl Stewart; 62 Andrew Vasquez	Catchers: 64 Willians Astudillo; 15 Jason Castro; 43 Mitch Garver; 46 Chris Gimenez; 66 Juan Graterol; 46 Bobby Wilson; Infielders: 16 Ehire Adrianza; 31 Tyler Austin; 2 Brian Dozier; 5 Eduardo Escobar; 24 Logan Forsythe; 7 Joe Mauer; 99 Logan Morrison; 40 Gregorio Petit; 11 Jorge Polanco; 22 Miguel Sanó	Outfielders: 25 Byron Buxton; 60 Jake Cave; 51 Johnny Field; 36 Robbie Grossman; 26 Max Kepler; 24 Ryan LaMarre; 45 Taylor Motter; 20 Eddie Rosario	Manager: 4 Paul Molitor; Coaches: 41 Garvin Alston (pitching); 75 Nate Dammann (bullpen catcher); 13 Gene Glynn (third base); 18 Eddie Guardado (bullpen); 63 Rudy Hernandez (assistant hitting); 30 Jeff Pickler (major league coach); 76 Ben Richardson (bullpen catcher); 33 James Rowson (hitting); 37 Jeff Smith (first base); 9 Derek Shelton (bench)

== Player stats ==
=== Batting ===
Note: G = Games played; AB = At bats; R = Runs; H = Hits; 2B = Doubles; 3B = Triples; HR = Home runs; RBI = Runs batted in; SB = Stolen bases; BB = Walks; AVG = Batting average; SLG = Slugging average

Player	G	AB	R	H	2B	3B	HR	RBI	SB	BB	AVG	SLG
Eddie Rosario	138	559	87	161	31	2	24	77	8	30	.288	.479
Max Kepler	156	532	80	119	30	4	20	58	4	71	.224	.408
Joe Mauer	127	486	64	137	27	1	6	48	0	51	.282	.379
Brian Dozier	104	410	65	93	21	2	16	52	8	46	.227	.405
Robbie Grossman	129	396	50	108	27	1	5	48	0	60	.273	.384
Eduardo Escobar	97	368	45	101	37	3	15	63	1	34	.274	.514
Ehire Adrianza	114	335	42	84	23	1	6	39	5	24	.251	.379
Logan Morrison	95	318	41	59	13	0	15	39	1	34	.186	.368
Mitch Garver	102	302	38	81	19	2	7	45	0	29	.268	.414
Jorge Polanco	77	302	38	87	18	3	6	42	7	25	.288	.427
Jake Cave	91	283	54	75	16	2	13	45	2	18	.265	.473
Miguel Sanó	71	266	32	53	14	0	13	41	0	31	.199	.398
Logan Forsythe	50	178	19	46	6	0	0	14	1	24	.258	.292
Bobby Wilson	47	135	12	24	8	0	2	16	0	12	.178	.281
Tyler Austin	35	123	18	29	4	0	9	24	0	11	.236	.488
Ryan LaMarre	43	99	7	26	5	0	0	8	1	8	.263	.313
Willians Astudillo	29	93	9	33	4	1	3	21	0	2	.355	.516
Byron Buxton	28	90	8	14	4	0	0	4	5	3	.156	.200
Jason Castro	19	63	4	9	3	0	1	3	0	9	.143	.238
Gregorio Petit	26	61	7	15	2	0	0	3	3	6	.246	.279
Johnny Field	21	52	8	13	4	0	3	7	0	0	.250	.500
Chris Gimenez	13	29	6	8	1	0	2	6	0	3	.276	.517
Taylor Motter	9	19	0	1	0	0	0	1	1	2	.053	.053
Juan Graterol	3	7	2	1	0	0	0	0	0	1	.143	.143
Pitcher totals	162	20	2	2	0	0	0	0	0	0	.100	.100
Team totals	162	5526	738	1379	317	22	166	704	47	534	.250	.405

=== Pitching ===
Note: W = Wins; L = Losses; ERA = Earned run average; G = Games pitched; GS = Games started; SV = Saves; IP = Innings pitched; H = Hits allowed; R = Runs allowed; ER = Earned runs allowed; BB = Walks allowed; SO = Strikeouts

Player	W	L	ERA	G	GS	SV	IP	H	R	ER	BB	SO
Kyle Gibson	10	13	3.62	32	32	0	196.2	177	88	79	79	179
José Berríos	12	11	3.84	32	32	0	192.1	159	83	82	61	202
Jake Odorizzi	7	10	4.49	32	32	0	164.1	151	89	82	70	162
Lance Lynn	7	8	5.10	20	20	0	102.1	105	61	58	62	100
Trevor Hildenberger	4	6	5.42	73	0	7	73.0	75	46	44	26	70
Taylor Rogers	1	2	2.63	72	0	2	68.1	49	20	20	16	75
Matt Magill	3	3	3.81	40	0	0	56.2	58	24	24	23	56
Addison Reed	1	6	4.50	55	0	0	56.0	65	30	28	15	44
Fernando Romero	3	3	4.69	11	11	0	55.2	60	31	29	19	45
Ryan Pressly	1	1	3.40	51	0	0	47.2	46	19	18	19	69
Fernando Rodney	3	2	3.09	46	0	25	43.2	42	18	15	19	50
Zach Duke	3	4	3.62	45	0	0	37.1	44	19	15	15	39
Kohl Stewart	2	1	3.68	8	4	0	36.2	34	16	15	18	24
Gabriel Moya	3	1	4.71	35	6	0	36.1	35	19	19	13	31
Alan Busenitz	4	1	7.82	23	0	0	25.1	37	25	22	14	26
Trevor May	4	1	3.20	24	1	3	25.1	21	9	9	5	36
Tyler Duffey	2	2	7.20	19	1	0	25.0	26	22	20	4	19
Ervin Santana	0	1	8.03	5	5	0	24.2	31	22	22	9	16
Stephen Gonsalves	2	2	6.57	7	4	0	24.2	28	22	18	22	16
Matt Belisle	1	1	9.13	25	0	0	23.2	40	26	24	10	21
Adalberto Mejía	2	0	2.01	5	4	0	22.1	17	5	5	9	13
Zack Littell	0	2	6.20	8	2	0	20.1	25	17	14	11	14
Oliver Drake	0	0	2.21	19	0	0	20.1	12	6	5	7	22
Chase De Jong	1	1	3.57	4	4	0	17.2	18	9	7	6	13
Aaron Slegers	1	1	5.27	4	2	0	13.2	17	8	8	2	6
Phil Hughes	0	0	6.75	7	2	0	12.0	14	9	9	5	8
John Curtiss	0	1	5.68	8	0	0	6.1	8	4	4	4	7
Andrew Vasquez	1	0	5.40	9	0	0	5.0	5	4	3	2	7
Tyler Kinley	0	0	24.30	4	0	0	3.1	9	9	9	4	4
David Hale	0	0	12.00	1	0	0	3.0	4	4	4	4	2
Willians Astudillo	0	0	45.00	1	0	0	1.0	5	5	5	0	0
Mitch Garver	0	0	0.00	1	0	0	1.0	1	0	0	0	0
Chris Gimenez	0	0	45.00	1	0	0	1.0	6	5	5	0	1
Ryan LaMarre	0	0	13.50	1	0	0	0.2	1	1	1	0	0
Team totals	78	84	4.50	162	162	37	1443.1	1425	775	721	573	1377

== Game log ==
The Twins played two games against the Cleveland Indians on April 17 and 18 at Hiram Bithorn Stadium in San Juan, Puerto Rico. The games were considered home games for the Twins. An island-wide power outage occurred on April 18, but the game scheduled for that day was still played.

2018 game log: 78–84 (Home: 49–32; Away: 29–52)
March: 1–1 (Home: 0–0; Away: 1–1)

#	Date	Opponent	Score	Win	Loss	Save	Attendance	Record	Streak
1	March 29	@ Orioles	2–3	Bleier (1–0)	**Rodney** (0–1)	—	45,469	0–1	L1
2	March 30	@ Orioles	6–2	**Gibson** (1–0)	Cashner (0–1)	—	17,763	1–1	W1

April: 8–14 (Home: 6–6; Away: 2–8)

#	Date	Opponent	Score	Win	Loss	Save	Attendance	Record	Streak
3	April 1	@ Orioles	7–0	**Berríos** (1–0)	Gausman (0–1)	—	17,212	2–1	W2
4	April 2	@ Pirates	4–5	Taillon (1–0)	**Lynn** (0–1)	Kontos (1)	30,186	2–2	L1
5	April 4	@ Pirates	7–3	**Rogers** (1–0)	Nova	—	20,690	3–2	W1
6	April 5	Mariners	4–2	**Duke** (1–0)	Altavilla (0–1)	**Rodney** (1)	39,214	4–2	W2
7	April 7	Mariners	4–11	Leake (2–0)	**Berríos** (1–1)	—	18,416	4–3	L1
–	April 8	Mariners	**Postponed (snow)** (Makeup date: May 14.)						
8	April 9	Astros	2–0	Verlander (2–0)	**Rogers** (1–1)	Giles	15,521	4–4	L2
9	April 10	Astros	4–1	**Odorizzi** (1–0)	Keuchel (0–2)	**Rodney** (2)	15,500	5–4	W1
10	April 11	Astros	9–8	**Rodney** (1–1)	Peacock (1–1)	—	15,438	6–4	W2
11	April 12	White Sox	4–0	**Berríos** (2–1)	Giolito (0–2)	—	15,474	7–4	W3
–	April 13	White Sox	**Postponed (snow)** (Makeup date: June 5)						
–	April 14	White Sox	**Postponed (snow)** (Makeup date: September 28)						
–	April 15	White Sox	**Postponed (snow)** (Makeup date: August 20)						
12	April 17	Indians	1–6	Kluber (2–1)	**Odorizzi** (1–1)	—	19,519	7–5	L1
13	April 18	Indians	2–1 (16)	**Busenitz** (1–0)	Tomlin (0–2)	—	19,537	8–5	W1
14	April 20	@ Rays	7–8 (10)	Colomé (1–2)	**Duke** (1–1)	—	9,786	8–6	L1
15	April 21	@ Rays	1–10	Snell (3–1)	**Gibson** (1–1)	—	10,106	8–7	L2
16	April 22	@ Rays	6–8	Colomé (2–2)	**Reed** (0–1)	—	12,515	8–8	L3
17	April 23	@ Yankees	1–14	Tanaka (3–2)	**Odorizzi** (1–2)	—	39,249	8–9	L4
18	April 24	@ Yankees	3–8	Sabathia (1–0)	**Berríos** (2–2)	—	39,025	8–10	L5
19	April 25	@ Yankees	4–7	Green (2–0)	**Lynn** (0–2)	Chapman (4)	39,243	8–11	L6
20	April 26	@ Yankees	3–4	Betances (1–1)	**Rodney** (1–2)	—	40,758	8–12	L7
21	April 27	Reds	9–15	Hernandez (1–0)	**Duffey** (0–1)	—	25,002	8–13	L8
22	April 28	Reds	3–1	**Odorizzi** (2–2)	Romano (1–3)	**Rodney** (3)	27,115	9–13	W1
23	April 29	Reds	2–8	Mahle (2–3)	**Berríos** (2–3)	—	25,677	9–14	L1
24	April 30	Blue Jays	5–7	Sanchez (2–2)	**Lynn** (0–3)	Osuna (7)	16,456	9–15	L2

May: 13–15 (Home: 5–7; Away: 8–8)

#	Date	Opponent	Score	Win	Loss	Save	Attendance	Record	Streak
25	May 1	Blue Jays	4–7 (10)	Clippard (4–0)	**Curtiss** (0–1)	Osuna (8)	16,245	9–16	L3
26	May 2	Blue Jays	4–0	**Romero** (1–0)	Stroman (0–4)	—	16,420	10–16	W1
27	May 3	@ White Sox	5–6	Jones (2–0)	**Reed** (0–2)	—	13,260	10–17	L1
28	May 4	@ White Sox	6–4	**Berríos** (3–3)	Fulmer (2–2)	**Rodney** (4)	15,936	11–17	W1
29	May 5	@ White Sox	8–4	**Lynn** (1–3)	Santiago (0–1)	—	23,765	12–17	W2
30	May 6	@ White Sox	5–3	**Duke** (2–1)	Rondón (1–2)	**Rodney** (5)	17,424	13–17	W3
31	May 7	@ Cardinals	6–0	**Romero** (2–0)	Gant (1–1)	—	40,182	14–17	W4
32	May 8	@ Cardinals	7–1	**Odorizzi** (3–2)	Martínez (3–2)	—	39,253	15–17	W5
33	May 10	@ Angels	4–7	Álvarez (2–0)	**Berríos** (3–4)	Johnson (1)	30,127	15–18	L1
34	May 11	@ Angels	5–4	**Magill** (1–0)	Anderson (0–1)	**Rodney** (6)	43,521	16–18	W1
35	May 12	@ Angels	5–3 (12)	**Hildenberger** (1–0)	Ramirez (1–2)	**Rodney** (7)	40,117	17–18	W2
36	May 13	@ Angels	1–2	Parker (1–1)	**Duke** (2–2)	—	38,029	17–19	L1
37	May 14	Mariners	0–1	Pazos (1–0)	**Hildenberger** (1–1)	Diaz (14)	16,581	17–20	L2
38	May 15	Cardinals	4–1	**Berríos** (4–4)	Cecil (0–1)	**Rodney** (8)	24,259	18–20	W1
39	May 16	Cardinals	5–7	Hicks (2–1)	**Lynn** (1–4)	Norris (9)	25,180	18–21	L1
40	May 18	Brewers	3–8	Suter (3–3)	**Gibson** (1–2)	—	29,349	18–22	L2
41	May 19	Brewers	4–5	Hader (2–0)	**Reed** (0–3)	—	30,182	18–23	L3
42	May 20	Brewers	3–1	**Reed** (1–3)	Guerra (0–2)	**Rodney** (9)	28,577	19–23	W1
43	May 21	Tigers	4–2	**Berríos** (5–4)	Stumpf (1–3)	**Rodney** (10)	17,161	20–23	W2
44	May 22	Tigers	6–0	**Lynn** (2–4)	Boyd (2–4)	—	25,559	21–23	W3
45	May 23	Tigers	1–4	Fulmer (2–3)	**Gibson** (1–3)	Greene (11)	23,891	21–24	L1
46	May 25	@ Mariners	1–2	Paxton (4–1)	**Romero** (2–1)	Díaz (18)	19,924	21–25	L2
47	May 26	@ Mariners	3–4 (12)	Bradford (4–0)	**Magill** (1–1)	—	23,986	21–26	L3
48	May 27	@ Mariners	1–3	Leake (5–3)	**Berríos (5–5)**	Colomé (12)	31,340	21–27	L4
49	May 28	@ Royals	8–5	**Lynn** (3–4)	Junis (5–4)	**Rodney** (11)	18,572	22–27	W1
50	May 29	@ Royals	1–2 (10)	Barlow (1–0)	**Rogers** (1–2)	—	20,533	22–28	L1
51	May 30	@ Royals	8–11	McCarthy (4–2)	**Romero** (2–2)	Herrera (12)	21,343	22–29	L2
52	May 31	Indians	8–9	Olson (1–1)	**Reed** (1–4)	Allen (9)	19,148	22–30	L3

June: 13–14 (Home: 9–7; Away: 4–7)

#	Date	Opponent	Score	Win	Loss	Save	Attendance	Record	Streak
53	June 1	Indians	7–4	**Berríos** (6–5)	Carrasco (6–4)	**Rodney** (12)	30,171	23–30	W1
54	June 2	Indians	7–1	**Lynn** (4–4)	Bauer (4–4)	—	23,476	24–30	W2
55	June 3	Indians	7–5	**Rodney** (2–2)	Allen (2–2)	—	26,096	25–30	W3
56	June 5	White Sox	4–2	**Duffey** (1–1)	Jones (2–2)	**Rodney** (13)	26,261	26–30	W4
57	June 5	White Sox	3–6	Giolito (4–6)	**Littell** (0–1)	Soria (5)	26,261	26–31	L1
58	June 6	White Sox	2–5	Santiago (2–2)	**Odorizzi** (3–3)	Soria (6)	20,393	26–32	L2
59	June 7	White Sox	7–2	**Berríos** (7–5)	Shields (1–7)	—	21,469	27–32	W1
60	June 8	Angels	2–4	Ramirez (2–2)	**Pressly** (0–1)	Parker (6)	28,383	27–33	L1
61	June 9	Angels	1–2	Skaggs (5–4)	**Gibson** (1–4)	Parker (7)	24,061	27–34	L2
62	June 10	Angels	7–5	**Romero** (3–2)	Tropeano (3–4)	—	28,656	28–34	W1
63	June 12	@ Tigers	6–4	**Pressly** (1–1)	Coleman (3–1)	**Rodney** (14)	20,340	29–34	W2
64	June 13	@ Tigers	2–5	Jiménez (3–0)	**Reed** (1–5)	Greene (16)	19,206	29–35	L1
65	June 14	@ Tigers	1–3	Fulmer (3–5)	**Lynn** (4–5)	Greene (17)	27,573	29–36	L2
66	June 15	@ Indians	6–3	**Gibson** (2–4)	Kluber (10–3)	**Rodney** (15)	32,637	30–36	W1
67	June 16	@ Indians	9–3	**Magill** (2–1)	Carrasco (8–5)	—	30,282	31–36	W2
68	June 17	@ Indians	1–4	Bieber (1–0)	**Odorizzi (3–4)**	Allen (14)	27,128	31–37	L1
69	June 19	Red Sox	6–2	**Duke** (3–2)	Scott (0–1)	—	28,550	32–37	W1
70	June 20	Red Sox	4–1	**Lynn** (5–5)	Price (8–5)	**Rodney** (16)	33,153	33–37	W2
71	June 21	Red Sox	2–9	Porcello (9–3)	**Gibson** (2–5)	—	32,631	33–38	L1
72	June 22	Rangers	1–8	Minor (5–4)	**Romero** (3–3)	Chavez (1)	28,004	33–39	L2
73	June 23	Rangers	6–9	Gallardo (1–0)	**Odorizzi** (3–5)	Kela (18)	23,230	33–40	L3
74	June 24	Rangers	2–0	**Berríos** (8–5)	Colón (4–5)	**Rodney** (17)	23,633	34–40	W1
75	June 26	@ White Sox	4–8	**Lopez** (3–5)	Lynn (5–6)	—	16, 276	34–41	L1
76	June 27	@ White Sox	1–6	Shields (3–9)	**Gibson** (2–6)	—	19,466	34–42	L3
77	June 28	@ White Sox	2–1 (13)	**Busenitz** (2–0)	Santiago (2–3)	—	21,610	35–42	W1
78	June 29	@ Cubs	6–10	Montgomery (3–2)	**Berríos** (8–6)	Morrow (17)	41,492	35–43	L1
79	June 30	@ Cubs	9–14	Wilson (2–2)	**Hildenberger** (1–2)	—	40,950	35–44	L2

July: 14–13 (Home: 10–3; Away: 4–10)

#	Date	Opponent	Score	Win	Loss	Save	Attendance	Record	Streak
80	July 1	@ Cubs	10–11	Lester (11–2)	**Lynn** (5–7)	Morrow (18)	40,051	35–45	L3
81	July 2	@ Brewers	5–6 (10)	Knebel (2–0)	**Littell** (0–2)	—	31,353	35–46	L4
82	July 3	@ Brewers	0–2	Guerra (5–5)	**Odorizzi** (3–6)	Knebel (9)	32,375	35–47	L5
83	July 4	@ Brewers	2–3	Jeffress (6–1)	**Berríos** (8–7)	Knebel (10)	36,700	35–48	L6
84	July 5	Orioles	5–2	**Slegers** (1–0)	Cashner (2–9)	**Rodney** (18)	23,895	36–48	W1
85	July 6	Orioles	6–2	**Lynn** (6–7)	Bundy (6–8)	—	27,570	37–48	W2
86	July 7	Orioles	5–4	**Gibson** (3–6)	Castro (2–5)	**Rodney** (19)	25,974	38–48	W3
87	July 8	Orioles	10–1	**Odorizzi** (4–6)	Cobb (2–11)	—	22,557	39–48	W4
88	July 9	Royals	3–1	**Berríos** (9–7)	Hill (1–3)	**Rodney** (20)	20,199	40–48	W5
89	July 10	Royals	4–9	Flynn (1–1)	**Slegers** (1–1)	—	27,551	40–49	L1
90	July 11	Royals	8–5	**Lynn** (7–7)	Sparkman (0–1)	—	26,708	41–49	W1
91	July 12	Rays	5–1	**Gibson** (4–6)	Snell (12–5)	**Rodney** (21)	25,281	42–49	W2
92	July 13	Rays	11–8	**Hildenberger** (2–2)	Eovaldi (3–4)	—	28,756	43–49	W3
93	July 14	Rays	6–19	Schultz (1–0)	**Duke** (3–3)	—	25,094	43–50	L1
94	July 15	Rays	11–7 (10)	**Busenitz** (3–0)	Andriese (2–4)	—	25,561	44–50	W1
**89th All-Star Game in Washington, D.C.**
95	July 20	@ Royals	5–6	Duffy (6–8)	**Gibson** (4–7)	Maurer (1)	27,719	44–51	L1
96	July 21	@ Royals	2–4	Flynn (2–1)	**Lynn** (7–8)	Peralta (3)	22,159	44–52	L2
97	July 22	@ Royals	3–4	Keller (3–4)	**Duke** (3–4)	Peralta (4)	18,107	44–53	L3
98	July 23	@ Blue Jays	8–3	**Mejia** (1–0)	Santos (0–1)	—	25,405	45–53	W1
99	July 24	@ Blue Jays	5–0	**Berríos** (10–7)	Borucki (0–2)	—	31,933	46–53	W2
100	July 25	@ Blue Jays	12–6 (11)	**Belisle** (1–0)	Petricka (1-1)	—	32,686	47–53	W3
101	July 26	@ Red Sox	2–1	**Gibson** (5–7)	Barnes (3-3)	**Rodney** (22)	37,439	48–53	W4
102	July 27	@ Red Sox	3–4	Thornburg (1–0)	**Belisle** (1–1)	—	37,273	48–54	L1
103	July 28	@ Red Sox	4–10	Porcello (13–4)	**Odorizzi** (4–7)	—	36,798	48–55	L2
104	July 29	@ Red Sox	0–3	Eovaldi (4–4)	**Berríos** (10–8)	Kimbrel (33)	36,785	48–56	L3
105	July 30	Indians	5–4	**Rodney** (3–2)	Ramirez (0–1)	—	26,256	49–56	W1
106	July 31	Indians	2–6	Bauer (10–6)	**Gibson** (5–8)	Allen (21)	25,407	49–57	L1

August: 14–14 (Home: 9–6; Away: 5–8)

#	Date	Opponent	Score	Win	Loss	Save	Attendance	Record	Streak
107	August 1	Indians	0–2	Carrasco (13–5)	**Magill** (2–2)	Hand (26)	29,261	49–58	L2
108	August 3	Royals	6–4	**Moya** (1–0)	Flynn (2–3)	**Rodney** (23)	22,236	50–58	W1
109	August 4	Royals	8–2	**Berríos** (11–8)	Smith (1–3)	—	27,909	51–58	W2
110	August 5	Royals	6–5	**Moya** (2–0)	Duffy (7–10)	**Rodney** (24)	25,390	52–58	W3
111	August 6	@ Indians	0–10	Bauer (11–6)	**Gibson** (5–9)	—	18,620	52–59	L1
112	August 7	@ Indians	3–2	**Mejia** (2–0)	Carrasco (13–6)	Rodney (25)	19,921	53–59	W1
113	August 8	@ Indians	2–5	Allen (4-4)	**Hildenberger** (2–3)	—	25,476	53–60	L1
114	August 9	@ Indians	4–5	Miller (2–3)	**Reed** (1–6)	—	25,942	53–61	L2
115	August 10	@ Tigers	3–5	Zimmermann (5–4)	**Santana** (0–1)	Greene (24)	24,849	53–62	W1
116	August 11	@ Tigers	4–3	**Gibson** (6–9)	Liriano (3–7)	**Hildenberger** (1)	26,991	54–62	W1
117	August 12	@ Tigers	2–4	Boyd (7–10)	**Stewart** (0–1)	Greene (25)	30,105	54–63	L1
118	August 14	Pirates	5–2	**Odorizzi** (5–7)	Taillon (9–9)	**Hildenberger** (2)	28,515	55–63	W1
119	August 15	Pirates	6–4	**Moya** (3–0)	Santana (2–2)	**Hildenberger** (3)	26,191	56–63	W2
120	August 16	Tigers	15–8	**May** (1–0)	Liriano (3–8)	—	25,108	57–63	W3
121	August 17	Tigers	5–4	**Gibson** (7–9)	Boyd (7–11)	**Rogers** (1)	26,605	58–63	W4
122	August 18	Tigers	5–7	Carpenter (1–1)	**Duffey** (1–2)	Greene (26)	31,904	58–64	L1
123	August 19	Tigers	5–4	**Hildenberger** (3–3)	Wilson (1–4)	—	27,917	59–64	W1
124	August 20	White Sox	5–8	Giolito (9–9)	Gonsalves (0–1)	—	23,431	59–65	L1
125	August 21	@ White Sox	5–2	**May** (2–0)	Covey (4–11)	**Rogers** (2)	23,133	60–65	W1
126	August 22	@ White Sox	3–7	Rodón (5–3)	**Gibson** (7–10)	—	15,160	60–66	L1
127	August 23	A's	6–4	**Busenitz** (4–0)	Cahill (5–3)	**Hildenberger** (4)	24,171	61–66	W1
128	August 24	A's	1–7	Manaea (12–9)	**Odorizzi** (5–8)	—	22,568	61–67	L1
129	August 25	A's	2–6	Fiers (10–6)	**Gonsalves** (0–2)	—	28,772	61–68	L2
130	August 26	A's	2–6	Buchter (3–0)	**Berríos** (11–9)	—	23,318	61–69	L3
131	August 28	@ Indians	1–8	Carrasco (16–7)	**Gibson** (7–11)	—	19,194	61–70	L4
132	August 29	@ Indians	4–3	**May** (3–0)	Allen (4–6)	**Hildenberger** (5)	20,398	62–70	W1
133	August 30	@ Indians	3–5	Clevinger (10–7)	**Odorizzi** (5–9)	Hand (30)	20,244	62–71	L1
134	August 31	@ Rangers	10–7	**Magill** (3–2)	Moore (3–7)	—	22,808	63–71	W1

September: 15–13 (Home: 10–3; Away: 5–10)

#	Date	Opponent	Score	Win	Loss	Save	Attendance	Record	Streak
135	September 1	@ Rangers	4–7	Gallardo (8–5)	Berríos (11–10)	Leclerc (8)	32,175	63–72	L1
136	September 2	@ Rangers	4–18	Méndez (1–1)	**Moya** (3–1)	Butler (2)	23,423	63–73	L2
137	September 3	@ Astros	1–4	Keuchel (11–10)	**Gibson** (7–12)	Peacock (3)	39,559	63–74	L3
138	September 4	@ Astros	2–5	Verlander (14–9)	**May** (3–1)	Osuna (13)	31,315	63–75	L4
139	September 5	@ Astros	1–9	Valdez (3–1)	**Odorizzi** (5–10)	—	31,011	63–76	L5
140	September 7	Royals	10–6	**May** (4–1)	Sparkman (0–3)	—	19,944	64–76	W1
141	September 8	Royals	1–4	López (2–4)	**Berríos** (11–11)	Peralta (9)	25,814	64–77	L1
142	September 9	Royals	3–1	**Hildenberger** (4–3)	Hammel (2–13)	—	20,903	65–77	W1
143	September 10	Yankees	2–7	Happ (16–6)	**Gibson** (7–13)	—	21,565	65–78	L1
144	September 11	Yankees	10–5	**Stewart** (1–1)	Gray (10–9)	—	20,343	66–78	W1
145	September 12	Yankees	3–1	**Odorizzi** (6–10)	Severino (17–8)	**Hildenberger** (4)	24,134	67–78	W2
146	September 13	@ Royals	4–6	Fillmyer (3–1)	**Busenitz** (4–1)	Peralta (11)	18,745	67–79	L1
147	September 14	@ Royals	4–8	Hammel (3–13)	**Hildenberger** (4–4)	—	18,389	67–80	L2
148	September 15	@ Royals	3–10	Kennedy (2–8)	**De Jong** (0–1)	—	19,505	67–81	L3
149	September 16	@ Royals	9–6	**Gibson** (8–13)	Vasto (0–1)	—	20,286	68–81	W1
150	September 17	@ Tigers	6–1	**Stewart** (2–1)	Zimmermann (7–8)	—	19,004	69–81	W2
151	September 18	@ Tigers	5–3	**Odorizzi** (7–10)	Norris (0–5)	**Hildenberger** (7)	19,740	70–81	W3
152	September 19	@ Tigers	8–2	**Gonsalves** (1–2)	Turnbull (0–1)	—	19,296	71–81	W4
153	September 21	@ A's	6–7 (11)	Treinen (8–2)	**Magill** (3–3)	—	27,558	71–82	L1
154	September 22	@ A's	2–3	Treinen (9–2)	**Hildenberger** (4–5)	—	36,731	71–83	L2
155	September 23	@ A's	5–1	**Gibson** (9–13)	Cahill (6–4)	**May** (1)	35,754	72–83	W1
156	September 25	Tigers	2–4	Alcántara (1–0)	**Hildenberger** (4–6)	Greene (32)	23,849	72–84	L1
157	September 26	Tigers	11–4	**Duffey** (2–2)	Boyd (9–13)	—	21,316	73–84	W1
158	September 27	Tigers	9–3	**Gonsalves** (2–2)	Liriano (5–12)	—	22,342	74–84	W2
159	September 28	White Sox	2–1	**Berríos** (12–11)	López (7–10)	**May** (2)	20,245	75–84	W3
160	September 28	White Sox	12–4	**Jong** (1–1)	Giolito (10–13)	—	28,191	76–84	W4
161	September 29	White Sox	8–3	**Gibson** (10–13)	Rodón (6–8)	—	32,717	77–84	W5
162	September 30	White Sox	5–4	**Vasquez** (1–0)	Covey (5–14)	**May** (3)	30,144	78–84	W6

Legend: = Win = Loss = Postponement
Bold = Twins team member

== Farm system ==
Level	Team	League	Manager
AAA	Rochester Red Wings	International League	Joel Skinner
AA	Chattanooga Lookouts	Southern League	Tommy Watkins
A-Advanced	Fort Myers Miracle	Florida State League	Ramon Borrego
A	Cedar Rapids Kernels	Midwest League	Toby Gardenhire
Rookie	Elizabethton Twins	Appalachian League	Ray Smith
Rookie	GCL Twins	Arizona League	Dan Ramsay
Rookie	DSL Twins	Dominican Summer League	Robbie Robinson
