= 2012 18U Baseball World Championship =

Tournament details
- Country: South Korea
- Dates: August 30 - September 8
- Teams: 12
- Defending champions: Chinese Taipei

Final positions
- Champions: United States (6th title)
- Runners-up: Canada
- Third place: Chinese Taipei
- Fourth place: Colombia

Tournament statistics
- Games played: 43
- Attendance: 15,640 (364 per game)
- Best BA: (Netherlands) Marciano Phillippi (.500)
- Most HRs: Four tied (1)
- Most SBs: (United States) Ryan Boldt (12)
- Most Ks (as pitcher): (Japan) Shintaro Fujinami (26)

Awards
- MVP: (United States) Christian Arroyo

The 2012 IBAF 18U Baseball World Championship was an international baseball competition held in Seoul, South Korea from August 30 to September 8, 2012.

== Medalists ==
Event	Gold	Silver	Bronze
Tournament	United States; Willie Abreu; Christian Arroyo; Cavan Biggio; Ryan Boldt; Bryson Brigman; Ian Clarkin; Kevin Davis; Stephen Gonsalves; Connor Heady; John Kilichowski; Jeremy Martinez; Reese McGuire; Andy McGuire; Dom Núñez; Chris Okey; Ryan Olson; Carson Sands; Dominic Taccolini; Keegan Thompson; Garrett Williams	Canada; Christian Botnick; Dayton Dawe; Nathan DeSouza; Brock Dykxhoorn; Kyle Hann; Jesse Hodges; Ryan Kellogg; Jake Marks; Gareth Morgan; Josh Naylor; Daniel Pinero; Cal Quantrill; Jacob Robson; Travis Seabrooke; Logan Seifrit; Christopher Shaw; Brett Siddall; Owen Spiwak; Mitchell Triolo; Myles Vincent	Chinese Taipei; Chan Chun-Hsiang; Chen Yu-Ming; Chen Yueh-Se; Huang Tzu-Peng; Hung Hsin-Chi; Lee Tsung-Hsien; Tzu-Wei Lin; Lin Yi-Che; Lin Cheng-Hsien; Liu Chia-Kai; Liu Sheng-Hung; Sen Yu-Pin; Sen Jung-Hung; Su Chih-Chieh; Tsai I-Hsuan; Tsao Yu-Ning; Jen-Ho Tseng; Wang Cheng-Tang; Yang Chia-Wei; Yang Hsiang-Hao

== Teams ==
The following 12 teams qualified for the tournament.

Pool A	Pool B
Australia	Canada
Colombia	Chinese Taipei^{1}
Netherlands	Czech Republic
South Korea	Italy
United States	Japan
Venezuela	Panama

^1 Chinese Taipei is the official IBAF designation for the team representing the state officially referred to as the Republic of China, more commonly known as Taiwan. (See also political status of Taiwan for details.)

== Round 1 ==
=== Group A ===
==== Standings ====
Teams	W	L	Pct.	GB	R	RA
United States	4	1	.800	–	39	13
South Korea	3	1	.750	½	18	7
Colombia	3	2	.600	1	24	27
Venezuela	2	3	.400	2	19	18
Australia	2	3	.400	2	21	24
Netherlands	0	4	.000	3½	10	42

==== Schedule ====
August 31, 2012	Colombia	4 – 7	Australia	Jamsil Baseball Stadium, Seoul; Attendance: 100
August 31, 2012		Boxscore		Jamsil Baseball Stadium, Seoul; Attendance: 100

August 31, 2012	South Korea	2 – 1	Venezuela	Jamsil Baseball Stadium, Seoul; Attendance: 230
August 31, 2012		Boxscore		Jamsil Baseball Stadium, Seoul; Attendance: 230

August 31, 2012	Netherlands	0 – 17 (F/7)	United States	Mokdong Baseball Stadium, Seoul; Attendance: 145
August 31, 2012		Boxscore		Mokdong Baseball Stadium, Seoul; Attendance: 145

September 1, 2012	Australia	3 – 6 (F/10)	Venezuela	Jamsil Baseball Stadium, Seoul; Attendance: 100
September 1, 2012		Boxscore		Jamsil Baseball Stadium, Seoul; Attendance: 100

September 1, 2012	Colombia	9 – 6	Netherlands	Mokdong Baseball Stadium, Seoul; Attendance: 100
September 1, 2012		Boxscore		Mokdong Baseball Stadium, Seoul; Attendance: 100

September 1, 2012	South Korea	8 – 2	United States	Jamsil Baseball Stadium, Seoul; Attendance: 4,000
September 1, 2012		Boxscore		Jamsil Baseball Stadium, Seoul; Attendance: 4,000

September 2, 2012	United States	11 – 1 (F/7)	Colombia	Mokdong Baseball Stadium, Seoul; Attendance: 50
September 2, 2012		Boxscore		Mokdong Baseball Stadium, Seoul; Attendance: 50

September 2, 2012	Venezuela	8 – 3	Netherlands	Jamsil Baseball Stadium, Seoul; Attendance: 85
September 2, 2012		Boxscore		Jamsil Baseball Stadium, Seoul; Attendance: 85

September 2, 2012	Australia	1 – 7	South Korea	Mokdong Baseball Stadium, Seoul; Attendance: 1,000
September 2, 2012		Boxscore		Mokdong Baseball Stadium, Seoul; Attendance: 1,000

September 3, 2012	Netherlands	1 – 8	Australia	Mokdong Baseball Stadium, Seoul; Attendance: 65
September 3, 2012		Boxscore		Mokdong Baseball Stadium, Seoul; Attendance: 65

September 3, 2012	South Korea	1 – 3	Colombia	Mokdong Baseball Stadium, Seoul; Attendance: 800
September 3, 2012		Boxscore		Mokdong Baseball Stadium, Seoul; Attendance: 800

September 3, 2012	United States	3 – 2	Venezuela	Jamsil Baseball Stadium, Seoul; Attendance: 143
September 3, 2012		Boxscore		Jamsil Baseball Stadium, Seoul; Attendance: 143

September 4, 2012	Venezuela	2 – 7	Colombia	Mokdong Baseball Stadium, Seoul; Attendance: 50
September 4, 2012		Boxscore		Mokdong Baseball Stadium, Seoul; Attendance: 50

September 4, 2012	Netherlands	Rainout	South Korea	Jamsil Baseball Stadium, Seoul

September 5, 2012	United States	6 – 2	Australia	Jamsil Baseball Stadium, Seoul; Attendance: 150
September 5, 2012		Boxscore		Jamsil Baseball Stadium, Seoul; Attendance: 150

=== Group B ===
==== Standings ====
Teams	W	L	Pct.	GB	R	RA
Canada	4	1	.800	–	28	17
Japan	4	1	.800	–	29	7
Chinese Taipei	3	1	.750	½	16	10
Panama	2	3	.400	2	12	24
Italy	1	3	.250	2½	16	14
Czech Republic	0	5	.000	4	5	34

==== Schedule ====
August 31, 2012	Panama	2 – 0	Italy	Mokdong Baseball Stadium, Seoul; Attendance: 70
August 31, 2012		Boxscore		Mokdong Baseball Stadium, Seoul; Attendance: 70

August 31, 2012	Canada	6 – 5 (F/10)	Japan	Mokdong Baseball Stadium, Seoul; Attendance: 125
August 31, 2012		Boxscore		Mokdong Baseball Stadium, Seoul; Attendance: 125

August 31, 2012	Czech Republic	0 – 6	Chinese Taipei	Jamsil Baseball Stadium, Seoul; Attendance: 100
August 31, 2012		Boxscore		Jamsil Baseball Stadium, Seoul; Attendance: 100

September 1, 2012	Canada	4 – 3	Italy	Mokdong Baseball Stadium, Seoul; Attendance: 85
September 1, 2012		Boxscore		Mokdong Baseball Stadium, Seoul; Attendance: 85

September 1, 2012	Chinese Taipei	0 – 2	Japan	Jamsil Baseball Stadium, Seoul; Attendance: 500
September 1, 2012		Boxscore		Jamsil Baseball Stadium, Seoul; Attendance: 500

September 1, 2012	Czech Republic	2 – 6	Panama	Mokdong Baseball Stadium, Seoul; Attendance: 95
September 1, 2012		Boxscore		Mokdong Baseball Stadium, Seoul; Attendance: 95

September 2, 2012	Italy	12 – 1 (F/7)	Czech Republic	Jamsil Baseball Stadium, Seoul; Attendance: 72
September 2, 2012		Boxscore		Jamsil Baseball Stadium, Seoul; Attendance: 72

September 2, 2012	Chinese Taipei	6 – 5	Canada	Mokdong Baseball Stadium, Seoul; Attendance: 200
September 2, 2012		Boxscore		Mokdong Baseball Stadium, Seoul; Attendance: 200

September 2, 2012	Japan	8 – 0	Panama	Jamsil Baseball Stadium, Seoul; Attendance: 224
September 2, 2012		Boxscore		Jamsil Baseball Stadium, Seoul; Attendance: 224

September 3, 2012	Canada	3 – 2	Czech Republic	Jamsil Baseball Stadium, Seoul; Attendance: 73
September 3, 2012		Boxscore		Jamsil Baseball Stadium, Seoul; Attendance: 73

September 3, 2012	Chinese Taipei	4 – 3	Panama	Jamsil Baseball Stadium, Seoul; Attendance: 103
September 3, 2012		Boxscore		Jamsil Baseball Stadium, Seoul; Attendance: 103

September 3, 2012	Japan	7 – 1	Italy	Mokdong Baseball Stadium, Seoul; Attendance: 85
September 3, 2012		Boxscore		Mokdong Baseball Stadium, Seoul; Attendance: 85

September 4, 2012	Japan	7 – 0 (F/5)	Czech Republic	Jamsil Baseball Stadium, Seoul; Attendance: 45
September 4, 2012		Boxscore		Jamsil Baseball Stadium, Seoul; Attendance: 45

September 4, 2012	Italy	Rainout	Chinese Taipei	Mokdong Baseball Stadium, Seoul

September 5, 2012	Panama	1 – 10	Canada	Mokdong Baseball Stadium, Seoul; Attendance: 78
September 5, 2012		Boxscore		Mokdong Baseball Stadium, Seoul; Attendance: 78

== Round 2 ==
=== Group C ===
==== Standings ====
Teams	W	L	Pct.	GB	R	RA	Tiebreaker
United States	3	2	.600	–	28	16	1–1, 0.173 TQB
Canada	3	2	.600	–	25	26	1–1, -0.006 TQB
Chinese Taipei	3	2	.600	–	17	16	1–1, -0.192 TQB
Colombia	2	3	.400	1	14	25	2–0
Japan	2	3	.400	1	16	21	1–1
South Korea	2	3	.400	1	23	19	0–2

==== Schedule ====
September 5, 2012	South Korea	3 – 7 (F/10)	Chinese Taipei	Jamsil Baseball Stadium, Seoul; Attendance: 520
September 5, 2012		Boxscore		Jamsil Baseball Stadium, Seoul; Attendance: 520

September 5, 2012	Japan	0 – 3	Colombia	Mokdong Baseball Stadium, Seoul; Attendance: 118
September 5, 2012		Boxscore		Mokdong Baseball Stadium, Seoul; Attendance: 118

September 5, 2012	United States	0 – 1 (F/10)	Canada	Jamsil Baseball Stadium, Seoul; Attendance: 120
September 5, 2012		Boxscore		Jamsil Baseball Stadium, Seoul; Attendance: 120

September 6, 2012	Canada	10 – 6	Colombia	Mokdong Baseball Stadium, Seoul; Attendance: 84
September 6, 2012		Boxscore		Mokdong Baseball Stadium, Seoul; Attendance: 84

September 6, 2012	United States	5 – 1	Chinese Taipei	Mokdong Baseball Stadium, Seoul; Attendance: 113
September 6, 2012		Boxscore		Mokdong Baseball Stadium, Seoul; Attendance: 113

September 6, 2012	South Korea	2 – 4	Japan	Mokdong Baseball Stadium, Seoul; Attendance: 3,500
September 6, 2012		Boxscore		Mokdong Baseball Stadium, Seoul; Attendance: 3,500

September 7, 2012	Chinese Taipei	3 – 1	Colombia	Mokdong Baseball Stadium, Seoul; Attendance: 85
September 7, 2012		Boxscore		Mokdong Baseball Stadium, Seoul; Attendance: 85

September 7, 2012	Canada	3 – 9	South Korea	Mokdong Baseball Stadium, Seoul; Attendance: 210
September 7, 2012		Boxscore		Mokdong Baseball Stadium, Seoul; Attendance: 210

September 7, 2012	United States	10 – 5	Japan	Mokdong Baseball Stadium, Seoul; Attendance: 200
September 7, 2012		Boxscore		Mokdong Baseball Stadium, Seoul; Attendance: 200

== Round 3 ==
=== 11th place game ===
September 5, 2012	Czech Republic	4 – 7	Netherlands	Mokdong Baseball Stadium, Seoul; Attendance: 87
September 5, 2012		Boxscore		Mokdong Baseball Stadium, Seoul; Attendance: 87

=== 9th place game ===
September 6, 2012	Australia	11 – 2	Italy	Guei Ballpark, Seoul; Attendance: 45
September 6, 2012		Boxscore		Guei Ballpark, Seoul; Attendance: 45

=== 7th place game ===
September 6, 2012	Panama	5 – 4	Venezuela	Guei Ballpark, Seoul; Attendance: 65
September 6, 2012		Boxscore		Guei Ballpark, Seoul; Attendance: 65

=== 5th place game ===
September 8, 2012	Japan	0 – 3	South Korea	Mokdong Baseball Stadium, Seoul; Attendance: 1,100
September 8, 2012		Boxscore		Mokdong Baseball Stadium, Seoul; Attendance: 1,100

=== Bronze medal game ===
September 8, 2012	Chinese Taipei	4 – 1	Colombia	Mokdong Baseball Stadium, Seoul; Attendance: 120
September 8, 2012		Boxscore		Mokdong Baseball Stadium, Seoul; Attendance: 120

=== Gold medal game ===
September 8, 2012	United States	6 – 2	Canada	Mokdong Baseball Stadium, Seoul; Attendance: 400
September 8, 2012		Boxscore		Mokdong Baseball Stadium, Seoul; Attendance: 400

== Final standings ==
Rk	Team	W	L
1st place, gold medalist(s)	United States	7	2
Lost in gold medal game
2nd place, silver medalist(s)	Canada	6	3
Failed to qualify for gold medal game
3rd place, bronze medalist(s)	Chinese Taipei	6	2
4	Colombia	4	5
Failed to qualify for bronze medal game
5	South Korea	5	3
6	Japan	5	4
Failed to qualify for Round 2
7	Panama	3	3
8	Venezuela	2	4
Failed to qualify for the 7th place game
9	Australia	3	3
10	Italy	1	4
Failed to qualify for the 9th place game
11	Netherlands	1	4
12	Czech Republic	0	6

2012 18U Baseball World champions

United States
6th title

== Awards ==
Awards	Player
Most Valuable Player	(United States) Christian Arroyo
Outstanding Defensive Player	(Chinese Taipei) Tzu-Wei Lin

All-Tournament Team
Position	Player
Starting Pitcher	(Japan) Shintaro Fujinami
Relief Pitcher	(Chinese Taipei) Jen-Ho Tseng
Catcher	(Japan) Tomoya Mori
First Base	(Chinese Taipei) Chih-Chieh Su
Second Base	(Canada) Kyle Hann
Third Base	(Canada) Jesse Hodges
Shortstop	(United States) Christian Arroyo
Outfield	(South Korea) Jun-suk Song
Outfield	(Australia) Elliot Hargreaves
Outfield	(Colombia) Cristian Cano
Designated Hitter	(United States) Jeremy Martinez

== Officials ==
=== Technical Commissioners ===
Chairman:

Jim Baba (CAN)

Members:

- Brett Pickett (AUS)
- Koji Aso (JPN)
- Lin, Hua Wei (TPE)
- George Santiago (PUR)
- Lee, Kyu-Seok (KOR)
- Kang, Moon-Kil (KOR)
- Kim, Byung-Il (KOR)
- Park, Ro-Jun (KOR)
- Son, Hyuk (KOR)

=== Umpires ===
Umpire Director:

Gustavo Rodriguez (USA)

Members:

- Gregory Howard (AUS)
- Jon Oko (CAN)
- Bin Shun Chen (TPE)
- David Kulhanek (CZE)
- Marco Taurelli (ITA)
- Tomohisa Yamaguchi (JPN)
- Hi Young Park (KOR)
- Osmel Pimentel (VEN)
- Kou Wakabayashi (JPN)
- David Condon (USA)
- Kevin Sweeney (USA)
- Batista Fermin (PAN)
- Do Hyung Kim (KOR)
- Yang, Jae Man (KOR)
- Jae Hoon Lim (KOR)
- Seong Jun Park (KOR)
- Suk Man Hwang (KOR)
- Won Jung Park (KOR)

=== Scorers ===
Scoring Director:

Marco Battistella (ITA)

Members:

- Takuya Sumi (JPN)
- Feiko Drost (NED)
- Jennie Moloney (AUS)
- An, Woo Jun (KOR)
- Oh, Ik Hwan (KOR)
- Hwang, Sung Jun (KOR)
- Han, In Hii (KOR)
- Kim Young Sung (KOR)

=== Jury of Appeal ===
Chairman:

Gustavo Rodriguez (USA)

Members:

- Sang Hyung Lee (KOR)
- Gianni Fabrizi (ITA)
