= Gabriel Moya =

Gabriel Moya may refer to:

- Gabriel Moya (footballer)
- Gabriel Moya (baseball)
