= Ryan Boldt =

American baseball player (born 1994)

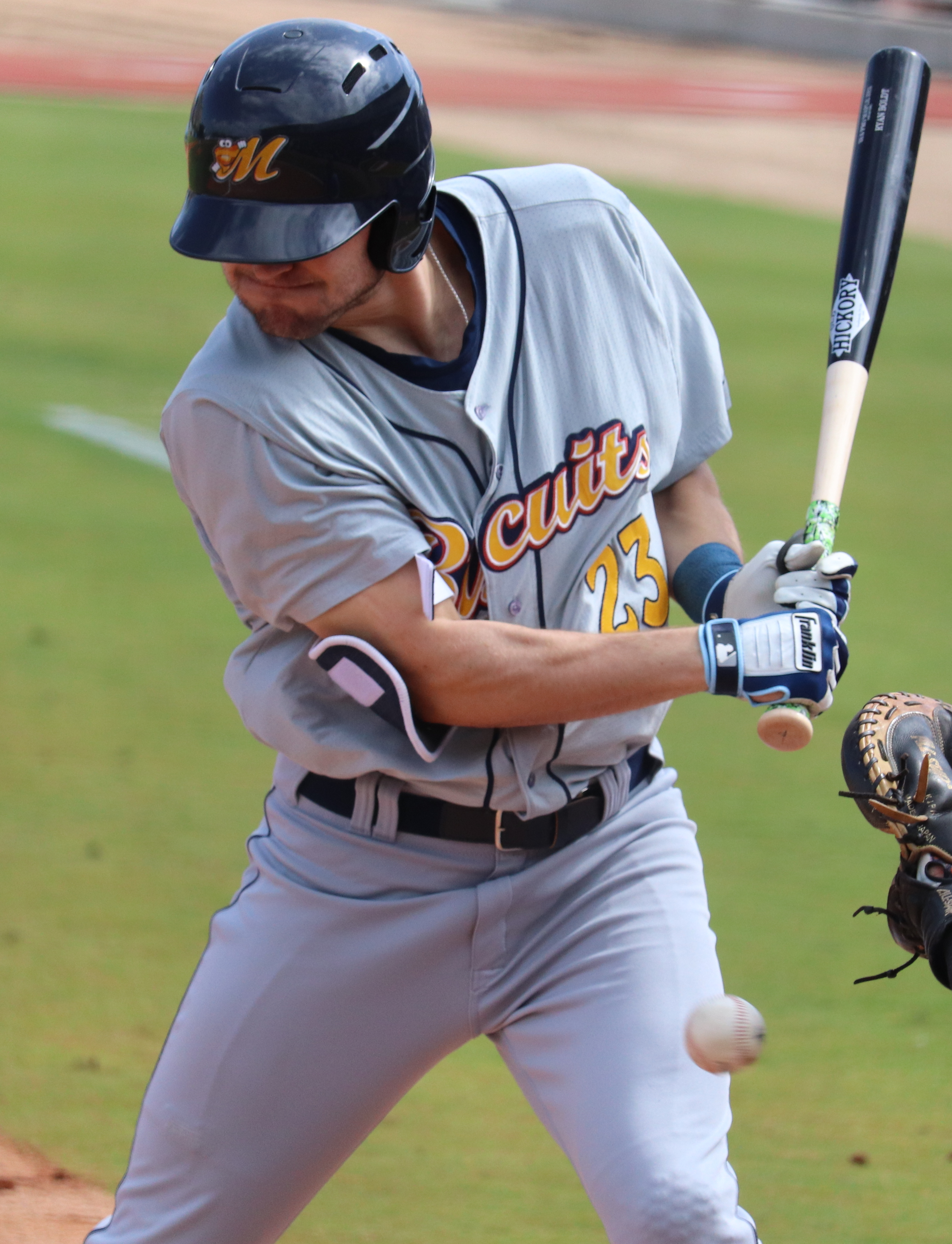
- Boldt with the Montgomery Biscuits in 2018
- Outfielder
- Born: November 22, 1994 (age 30); Red Wing, Minnesota, U.S.
- Bats: Left Throws: Right
Medals
Men's baseball
Representing United States
18U Baseball World Championship
Gold medal – first place	2012 Seoul	Team

Ryan Andrew Boldt (born November 22, 1994) is an American former professional baseball outfielder. He played college baseball for the Nebraska Cornhuskers of the University of Nebraska–Lincoln and played professionally for the Tampa Bay Rays organization.

== Amateur career ==
Boldt is naturally left-handed, but taught himself to throw with his right arm after having surgery to repair a broken radial head in his left elbow at the age of 10. He attended Red Wing High School in Red Wing, Minnesota, where he played for the school's baseball team. He joined the varsity team in his sophomore season but required further surgeries on his arm. In the fall of 2012, Boldt was named the most valuable player of the Perfect Game High School All-American Classic, and competed on the United States national team in the 2012 18U Baseball World Championship, winning the gold medal. He suffered a partial tear in the meniscus of his right knee in the first game of his senior season, causing him to miss the remainder of the year. The Boston Red Sox selected him in the 22nd round, with the 653rd selection, of the 2013 Major League Baseball draft. Though the Red Sox flew Boldt to Boston in an attempt to sign him, Boldt opted not to sign and instead enrolled at the University of Nebraska to play college baseball for the Nebraska Cornhuskers.

Boldt was the leadoff hitter for the Cornhuskers. In 2015, his sophomore year, he was named to the All-Big Ten Conference second team. After the 2015 season, he played collegiate summer baseball with the Bourne Braves of the Cape Cod Baseball League, and was named a league all-star. In 2016, Boldt was named to the Golden Spikes Award watchlist, and ranked as one of the best prospects available in the 2016 Major League Baseball draft. However, he slumped in the 2016 season, batting .208 over his last 25 games.

== Professional career ==
The Tampa Bay Rays selected Boldt in the second round of the 2016 draft. Boldt signed with the Rays and spent his first professional season with the Hudson Valley Renegades of the Low-A New York-Penn League, where he posted a .218 batting average with one home run and 15 RBIs in 43 games. Boldt spent 2017 with the Charlotte Stone Crabs of the High-A Florida State League, batting .295 with five home runs and 62 RBIs in 120 games. In 2018, he played for the Montgomery Biscuits of the Double-A Southern League.

Boldt missed the 2019 season due to Tommy John surgery, and the minor league season was cancelled in 2020 due to the COVID-19 pandemic. In 2021 and 2022, he played for the Durham Bulls. He was released from the Bulls on August 22, 2022.

== Personal life ==
Boldt has three older siblings. His cousin, Pat Kelly, played and coached baseball for the Cornhuskers and played one season in the Minnesota Twins minor league system.

Boldt earned his bachelor’s degree in nutrition and health sciences from Nebraska in May 2024.
