= Gareth Morgan (baseball) =

Canadian baseball player (born 1996)

- Outfielder
- Born: April 12, 1996 (age 29); Toronto, Ontario, Canada
- Bats: Right Throws: Right
- Stats at Baseball Reference
Medals
Men's baseball
Representing Canada
18U Baseball World Championship
Silver medal – second place	2012 Seoul	Team

Gareth Broderick Morgan (born April 12, 1996) is a Canadian former professional baseball outfielder.

== Career ==
=== Amateur ===
Born and raised in Toronto, Ontario, Morgan has also played on the Canadian junior national team, becoming the youngest player to do so, as he joined the team at age 14.

Morgan became the youngest player to participate in the Under Armour All-American Game powered by Baseball Factory in 2011 and the first Canadian to play in the Perfect Game All-American Game. The 2013 game was played at Petco Park in San Diego, California.

Morgan began training with former Olympic sprinter Ben Johnson in 2013.

=== Seattle Mariners ===
Morgan was drafted by the Seattle Mariners with the 74th overall pick in the 2014 Major League Baseball draft. He signed with Seattle and was assigned to the rookie-level Arizona League Mariners where he batted .148 with two home runs and 12 RBI in 45 games. Morgan returned to the Mariners in 2015 and posted a .225 batting average with five home runs and 30 RBI in 55 games.

In 2016, Morgan played in 38 total games between the AZL Mariners and the Bakersfield Blaze, posting a combined .232 average with one home run and 15 RBI. He spent all of 2017 with the Clinton LumberKings where he batted .230 with a career high 17 home runs and 61 RBI along with a .743 OPS. He was released by the Mariners organization on April 19, 2019.

=== Los Angeles Angels ===
On April 29, 2019, Morgan signed a minor league contract with the Los Angeles Angels. In 44 appearances for the High-A Inland Empire 66ers, he batted .290 with 20 home runs and 49 RBI; after being promoted to the Double-A Mobile BayBears, he hit .206 with one home run and 10 RBI. Morgan did not play in a game in 2020 due to the cancellation of the minor league season because of the COVID-19 pandemic.

In 2021, Morgan played in 38 games for the High-A Tri-City Dust Devils, but batted a paltry .181/.229/.292 with four home runs, 15 RBI, and three stolen bases. He was released by the Angels organization on August 5.

== International career ==
Morgan was selected for the Canada national baseball team at the 2015 WBSC Premier12 and 2019 WBSC Premier12.
