= Willians Astudillo =

Venezuelan baseball player (born 1991)

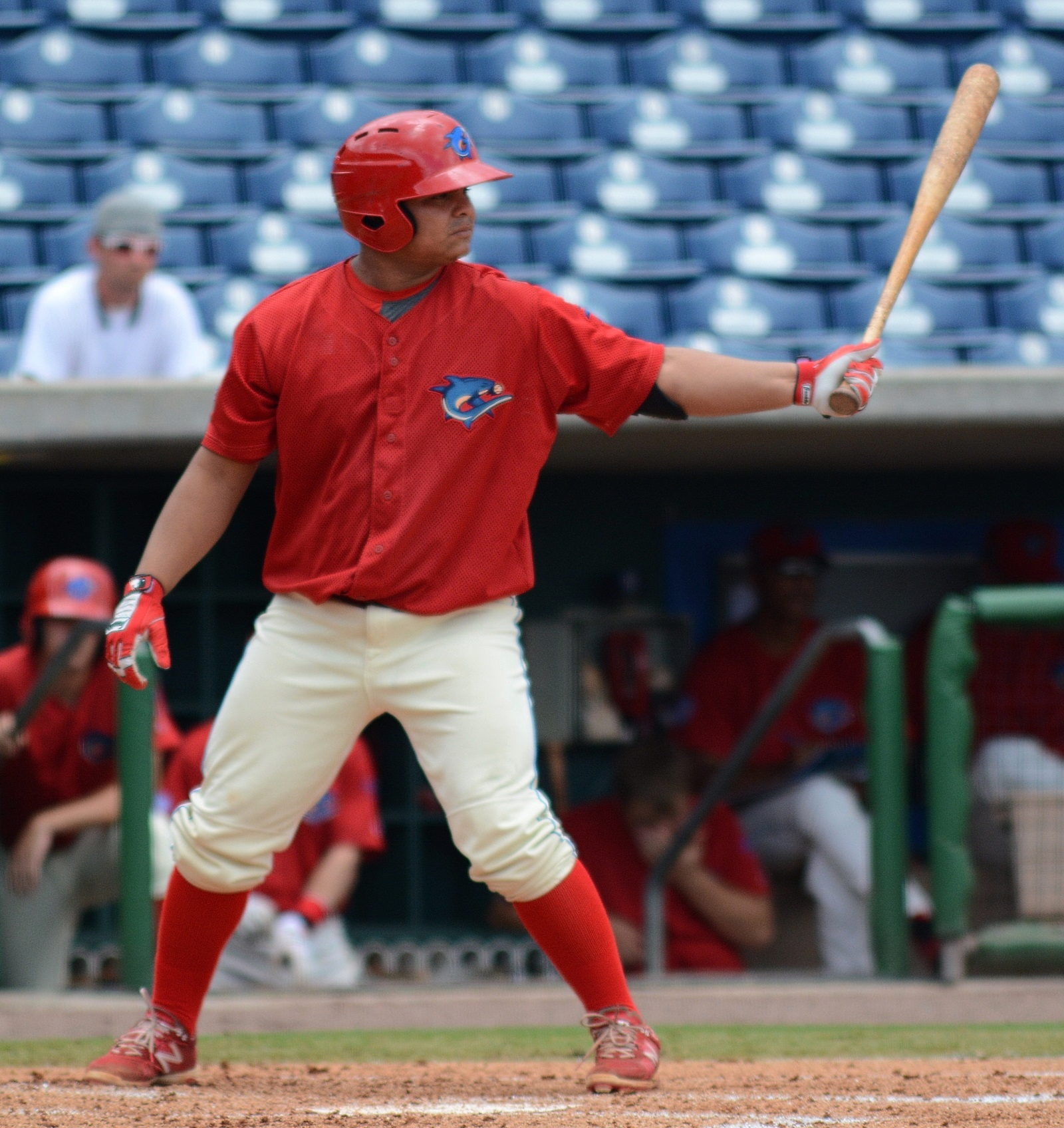
- Astudillo with the Clearwater Threshers in 2015

Centauros de La Guaira – No. 64
- Utility player
- Born: October 14, 1991 (age 34); Barcelona, Venezuela
- Bats: Right Throws: Right

Professional debut
- MLB: June 30, 2018, for the Minnesota Twins
- NPB: March 31, 2023, for the Fukuoka SoftBank Hawks

MLB statistics (through 2022 season)
- Batting average: .267
- Home runs: 16
- Runs batted in: 70

NPB statistics (through 2023 season)
- Batting average: .136
- Home runs: 1
- Runs batted in: 3
- Stats at Baseball Reference

Teams
- Minnesota Twins (2018–2021); Miami Marlins (2022); Fukuoka SoftBank Hawks (2023)

Willians Astudillo (born October 14, 1991), nicknamed "La Tortuga", is a Venezuelan professional baseball utility player for the Centauros de La Guaira of the Venezuelan Major League. He has previously played in Major League Baseball (MLB) for the Minnesota Twins and Miami Marlins, and in Nippon Professional Baseball (NPB) for the Fukuoka SoftBank Hawks. He made his MLB debut with the Twins in 2018 and has appeared at every position except shortstop in a major league game.

== Early life ==
Willians Astudillo was born in Barcelona, Venezuela, located on the country's Caribbean coast. Astudillo's father, a professional baseball player in Venezuela, and his grandfather taught him from an early age how to play baseball. Drills included flicking corn kernel projectiles for the young Astudillo to hit with a broomstick.

== Career ==
=== Philadelphia Phillies ===
Astudillo signed with the Philadelphia Phillies as an amateur free agent on December 15, 2008. In 2009, Astudillo made his professional debut for the VSL Phillies and spent the 2010 season with the team as well, hitting .250 and .312, respectively. He improved his performance for the team in 2011, slashing .361/.424/.449 in 52 games. He spent the 2012 season with the rookie-level Gulf Coast League Phillies, hitting .318/.327/.419 in 45 contests. After not playing in 2013, Astudillo spent the 2014 season with the Single-A Lakewood BlueClaws, posting a slash line of .333/.366/.434 in 117 games. In 2015, he played for the High-A Clearwater Threshers, slashing .314/.348/.384 with 3 home runs and 49 RBI in 107 games. He elected free agency following the season on November 6, 2015.

=== Atlanta Braves ===
On November 19, 2015, Astudillo signed a minor league contract with the Atlanta Braves. He spent the 2016 season with the Double-A Mississippi Braves, batting .267/.293/.332 with 4 home runs and 30 RBI in 89 games. Astudillo elected free agency following the year on November 7, 2016.

=== Arizona Diamondbacks ===
On April 4, 2017, Astudillo signed a minor league contract with the Arizona Diamondbacks, and was assigned to the Triple-A Reno Aces. He spent the year with the Aces, posting a slash of .342/.370/.558 with 4 home runs and 22 RBI in 36 games. He elected free agency following the season on November 6.

=== Minnesota Twins ===
On November 30, 2017, Astudillo signed a minor league deal with the Minnesota Twins and was assigned to the Triple-A Rochester Red Wings. Astudillo was called up to the majors for the first time on June 29, 2018. He made his major league debut at Wrigley Field the following afternoon against the Chicago Cubs as a defensive replacement in left field in the fifth inning, later switching to center field. In the sixth inning, he singled on a ground ball to second base to score Robbie Grossman for his first major league hit. On July 14, he made his major league pitching debut, completing the final inning of a 19–6 loss to the Tampa Bay Rays. He allowed five runs on five hits and two home runs in his lone pitching appearance of the season. Defensively, Astudillo played primarily at catcher and third base, also making appearances at second base. He appeared in 30 games total for the Twins in 2018, batting .355/.371/.516 with three home runs, 21 RBI, 2 walks and 3 strikeouts over 93 plate appearances.

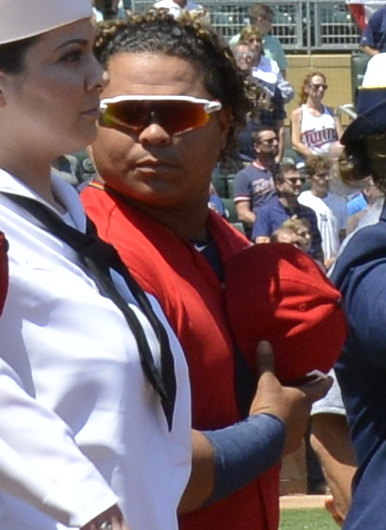
Astudillo with the Twins at Target Field in 2018

The Twins announced that Astudillo made their Opening Day roster on March 27, 2019, as one of five bench players. One month later, he was placed on the injured list with a left hamstring strain. He was batting .327 with two home runs. He ended the season hitting .268 in 58 games.

He has also played for the Caribes de Anzoátegui in the Venezuelan Professional Baseball League annually since the 2015–16 season.

On July 3, 2020, it was announced that Astudillo had tested positive for COVID-19. He appeared in just 8 games in 2020, gathering only 16 at-bats and batting .250/.250/.500 with 1 home run and 3 RBI. After the 2020 season, he returned to Caribes de Anzoátegui of the Liga Venezolana de Béisbol Profesional (LVMP). He also played for Venezuela in the 2021 Caribbean Series.

He pitched four times for the Twins in 2021. On April 17, he retired the Los Angeles Angels in the 8th inning three up, three down on seven pitches, with his slowest tracked strike thrown at 46 mph. Two other of his seven pitches were so slow that Statcast failed to track them. On May 17 against the Chicago White Sox, he gave up a controversial home run to Yermin Mercedes, who swung at a 3-0 pitch while up by 11 runs. He again pitched in relief on August 26, when he pitched a scoreless 8th inning against the Boston Red Sox. Astudillo ended the year hitting .236/.259/.375 with a career-high 7 home runs and 21 RBI in 72 games. On November 19, the Twins designated Astudillo for assignment. He cleared waivers and was released on November 24.

=== Miami Marlins ===
On March 13, 2022, Astudillo signed a minor league contract with the Miami Marlins. He began the 2022 season with the Triple-A Jacksonville Jumbo Shrimp. On May 25, Astudillo was selected to the active roster. He made his Marlins debut that day against the Tampa Bay Rays. Astudillo scored the winning run for the Marlins against the Washington Nationals on June 8, scoring from second base in the bottom of the 10th inning. He was designated for assignment on June 26 and was sent outright to Triple-A. On July 24, the Marlins selected his contract and he was promoted back to the major leagues. After four starts in the infield, he was designated for assignment on July 29. Astudillo cleared waivers and was sent outright to Jacksonville on August 1. He elected free agency on October 6.

=== Fukuoka SoftBank Hawks ===
On November 11, 2022, Japanese media reported that Astudillo would sign with the Fukuoka SoftBank Hawks of Nippon Professional Baseball. In 20 games for the Hawks in 2023, he batted .136/.220/.227 with one home run and 3 RBI. On December 1, SoftBank announced that Astudillo would not return, making him a free agent.

=== Saraperos de Saltillo ===
On February 8, 2024, Astudillo signed with the Saraperos de Saltillo of the Mexican League. In 29 games for Saltillo, he batted .252/.304/.311 with no home runs and 10 RBI. On June 4, Astudillo was released by the Saraperos.

=== Rieleros de Aguascalientes ===
On June 11, 2024, Astudillo signed with the Rieleros de Aguascalientes of the Mexican League. In 40 games for Aguascalientes, he slashed .319/.385/.438 with three home runs and 19 RBI. Astudillo was released by the Rieleros on October 22.

=== Centauros de La Guaira ===
Astudillo played for the Centauros de La Guaira of the Venezuelan Major League for the 2025 season. He batted .277/.357/.377 in 130 regular season at bats.

He returned for a second season in 2026. In 45 games he batted .276/.354/.399 with 4 home runs and 31 RBIs.

== Playing style ==
Astudillo became popular with fans for several reasons: his non-athletic build, multi-positional flexibility, and a highly aggressive batting style that yields few strikeouts or walks. At 5 feet 9 inches (1.75 m) tall and 225 pounds (102 kg), his determination helped propel him to the major leagues. “All my minor league career I heard I was not going to be a big leaguer because I did not 'look' like one. I was too short. I was too stocky. I did not have the physical traits customary associated with a Major League player,” he noted on Instagram. “Well here I am.”

Combining his professional careers in both the American minor leagues and Venezuela, Astudillo has played at every position. He then played every position, except shortstop, within his first two major league seasons. Twins chief baseball officer Derek Falvey commented that team scouts were perplexed by Astudillo, as projection systems failed to find any closely comparable hitters and were also amused when he informed them that he could play center field. To prove it, Astudillo played footage of himself robbing a home run in a Venezuelan winter league game.

In an era notable for its rising strikeout rates and where high walk rates are prized, Astudillo's aggressive batting approach yields an unusually low number of both. In his minor league career through the 2018 season, he had put the ball in play in 2,400 of 2,571 plate appearances. Astudillo produced eight of the 30 lowest strikeout rates with a minimum of 100 plate appearances according to Baseball Prospectus' database of over 42,000 individual seasons from 2005–2018. He produced the lowest of all at 0.9% in Venezuela in 2011, second-lowest at 1.8% in Venezuela in 2010, and fourth-lowest at 2.4% in the Florida State League in 2015.

== Personal life ==
Astudillo's brother, Wilfred, is also a professional baseball player, playing in affiliated Minor League Baseball from 2017 to 2022.

Astudillo's mother threw a ceremonial first pitch to Astudillo before a Mother's Day Twins game in 2019.

== See also ==
- List of Major League Baseball players from Venezuela
- Willians Astudillo on Instagram
