= Jen-Ho Tseng =

Taiwanese baseball player (born 1994)

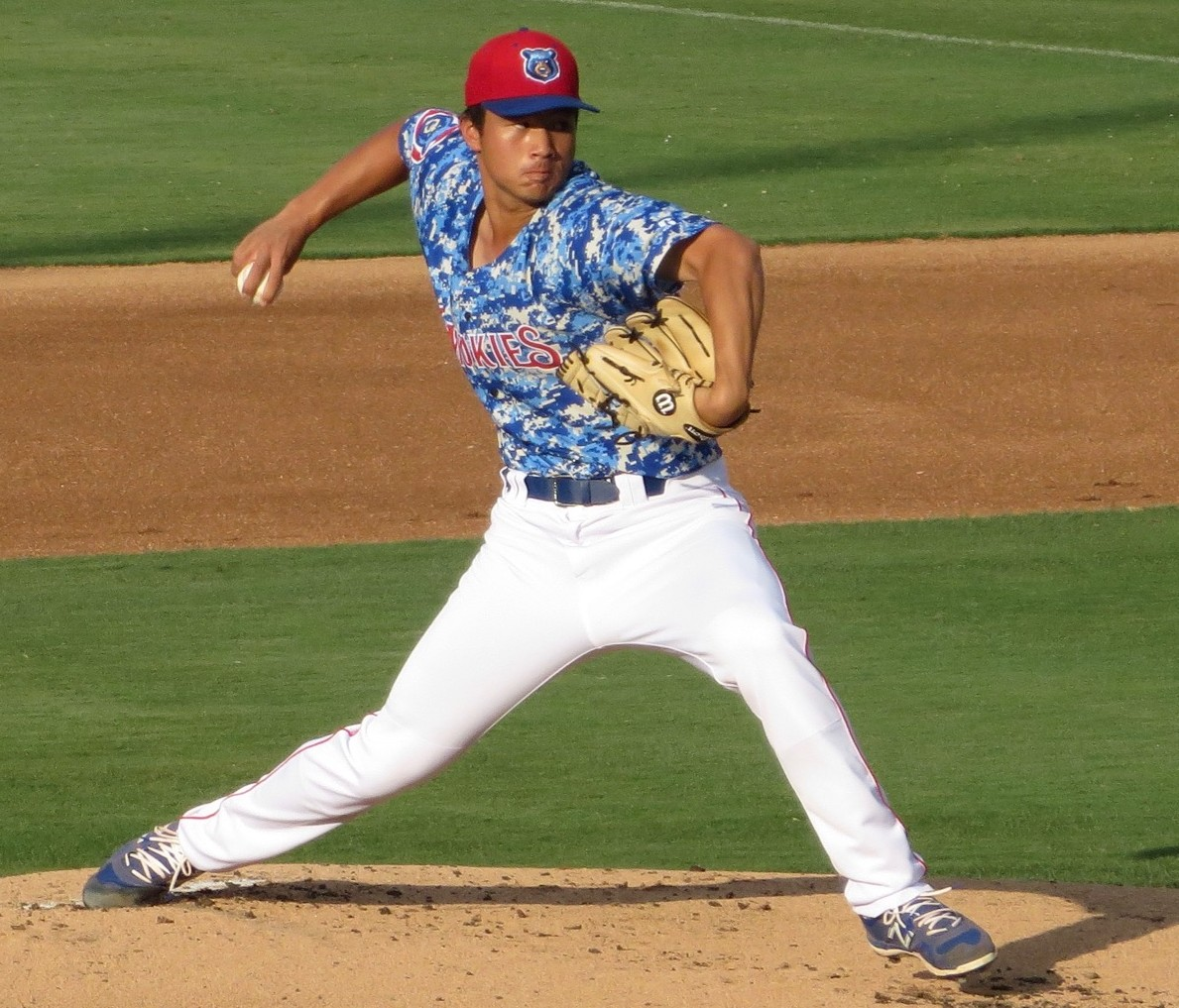
- Tseng pitching for the Tennessee Smokies in 2016

Wei Chuan Dragons – No. 55
- Pitcher
- Born: October 3, 1994 (age 31); Kaohsiung City, Taiwan
- Bats: Left Throws: Right

Professional debut
- MLB: September 14, 2017, for the Chicago Cubs
- CPBL: September 16, 2021, for the Rakuten Monkeys

MLB statistics (through 2018 season)
- Win–loss record: 1–0
- Earned run average: 9.00
- Strikeouts: 11

CPBL statistics (through 2025 season)
- Win–loss record: 15–14
- Earned run average: 4.41
- Strikeouts: 177
- Stats at Baseball Reference

Teams
- Chicago Cubs (2017–2018); Rakuten Monkeys (2021–2025); Wei Chuan Dragons (2026–present)

Career highlights and awards
- Taiwan Series champion (2025)
Medals
Men's baseball
Representing Chinese Taipei
18U Baseball World Championship
Bronze medal – third place	2012 Seoul	Team

Jen-Ho Tseng (Chinese: 曾仁和; born October 3, 1994) is a Taiwanese professional baseball pitcher for the Rakuten Monkeys of the Chinese Professional Baseball League (CPBL). He has previously played in Major League Baseball (MLB) for the Chicago Cubs.

== Career ==
=== Chicago Cubs ===
Tseng was signed by the Chicago Cubs as a non-drafted free agent on July 25, 2013. Tseng spent 2014 with the Single-A Kane County Cougars where he posted a 6–1 record with a 2.40 ERA. In 2015, Tseng pitched for the High-A Myrtle Beach Pelicans where he posted a 3.55 ERA, and in 2016, he pitched for the Double-A Tennessee Smokies, where he posted a 4.26 ERA.

In 2017, he started the season with Tennessee and was elevated to the Triple-A Iowa Cubs, where his combined record was 13–4 with a 2.54 ERA. On September 13, 2017, he was named the Cubs minor league pitcher of the year. He was called to the majors to make his Major League debut with the Cubs on September 14, 2017 against the New York Mets. Tseng's first career strikeout was against Travis d'Arnaud of the New York Mets on September 14, 2017. Tseng had a rough start, however, dropping a relay throw from Anthony Rizzo to field a ground ball. Tseng allowed five runs, including back-to-back homers from d'Arnaud and Dominic Smith. However, the Cubs stormed back to win 14-6.

MLB.com ranked Tseng as Chicago's twelfth best prospect going into the 2018 season. Tseng spent the majority of the season in Iowa, where he struggled to a 2-15 record and 6.27 ERA in 26 starts. In his only appearance for the Cubs, Tseng allowed 3 runs in 2.0 innings of work. On April 6, 2019, Tseng was designated for assignment by Chicago. Tseng was released by the Cubs organization on April 11.

=== Texas Rangers ===
On April 17, 2019, Tseng signed a minor league contract with the Texas Rangers organization. Tseng pitched one game apiece for the Low-A Spokane Indians and the rookie-level Arizona League Rangers, but spent most of the year on the disabled list with a shoulder injury. On November 4, he elected free agency.

=== Rakuten Monkeys ===
On July 1, 2021, Tseng announced that he would enter the mid-season draft in the Chinese Professional Baseball League (CPBL). On July 11, Tseng was selected by the Rakuten Monkeys with the team's third pick in the draft. In 12 appearances (five starts) for the team, he posted a 1-3 record and 3.06 ERA with 26 strikeouts across 35 1/3 innings pitched.

Tseng made nine appearances for Rakuten in 2025, but struggled to an 0-1 record and 10.00 ERA with eight strikeouts over 18 innings of work. With the Monkeys, Tseng won the 2025 Taiwan Series. He was non-tendered following the season.

=== Wei Chuan Dragons ===
On December 16, 2025, Tseng signed with the Wei Chuan Dragons of the Chinese Professional Baseball League.

== International career ==
Tseng represented Chinese Taipei national baseball team at the 2011 Asian Junior Championship, 2012 World Junior Baseball Championship, 2012 Asian Baseball Championship, 2013 World Baseball Classic Qualifiers and 2013 World Baseball Classic.

He debuted for the national team when he was just 18 years old. His sister also pitched for Taiwan's women national team.

Tseng was 0–1 with a 1.80 ERA in the 2011 Asian Junior Championship.

In the 2012 World Junior Baseball Championship, he was superb at 3–0, 0.84 with a save. In 21 1/3 innings, he fanned 22 and allowed only 12 hits and 2 walks. He beat Canada, South Korea and Colombia. He was second in the event in strikeouts (four behind Shintaro Fujinami), led in wins and tied Jae-min Shim for the most appearances (6). He was named the tourney's All-Star relief pitcher.

Jen-Ho then was the only high schooler picked for Taiwan's squad in the 2013 World Baseball Classic Qualifiers, 3 1/2 years younger than Yao-Lin Wang, the next-youngest). He made his lone appearance in their 9–0 win over New Zealand in the finale. Relieving Kai-Wen Cheng with a 7–0 lead in the 7th, he retired Moko Moanaroa then walked Beau Bishop. Tseng recovered to fan two players with minor league experience in the Alan Schoenberger and Tim Auty, to end the inning. He was replaced by Yen-Feng Lin in the 8th. He remained with Taiwan for the 2012 Asian Baseball Championship, going 1–0 and tossing six shutout innings; he beat rival South Korea to help ensure Taiwan getting a Silver Medal and Korea the Bronze.

== Pitching style ==
Tseng is a 6 ft 1 in, 210 lb right-handed pitcher. He throws a fastball around 90 mph (tops out at 95), knuckle-curve, sinker, changeup, and a cutter.

== Personal life ==
Jen-Ho Tseng's older sister Tseng Chi is also a professional baseball player.

== See also ==
- List of Major League Baseball players from Taiwan
