= Keegan Thompson =

American baseball player (born 1995)

Free agent
- Pitcher
- Born: March 13, 1995 (age 31); Cullman, Alabama, U.S.
- Bats: Right Throws: Right

MLB debut
- May 2, 2021, for the Chicago Cubs

MLB statistics (through 2026 season)
- Win–loss record: 17–11
- Earned run average: 3.87
- Strikeouts: 236
- Stats at Baseball Reference

Teams
- Chicago Cubs (2021–2024); Colorado Rockies (2026)
Medals
Men's baseball
Representing United States
World Youth Baseball Championship
Gold medal – first place	2011 Mexico	Team
18U Baseball World Championship
Gold medal – first place	2012 Seoul	Team

Keegan Cole Thompson (born March 13, 1995) is an American professional baseball pitcher who is a free agent. He has previously played in Major League Baseball (MLB) for the Chicago Cubs.

== Amateur career ==
Thompson attended Cullman High School in Cullman, Alabama. As a sophomore in 2011, he was named Alabama's Gatorade Player of the Year after finishing the season with a 9–2 record and a 1.70 ERA along with batting .433 with 17 home runs and 66 RBI. He won the award once again as a senior in 2013 after going 9–2 with a 1.25 ERA, striking out 124 batters in 72 2/3 innings pitched, along with hitting .420 with nine home runs and 43 RBI. Undrafted out of high school, he enrolled at Auburn University where he played college baseball for the Auburn Tigers.

In 2014, as a freshman for the Tigers, Thompson appeared in 14 games (with 12 being starts) in which he compiled a 5–3 record with a 2.01 ERA, earning him a spot on the SEC All-Freshman Team. As a sophomore in 2015, he pitched to a 7–3 record with a 3.10 ERA in 12 games (11 starts) in a season that was shortened due to elbow issues.

Thompson underwent Tommy John surgery in June 2015, and was forced to miss the whole 2016 season. Despite not pitching in 2016, he was still drafted by the Detroit Tigers in the 33rd round of the 2016 MLB draft, but did not sign. He returned to Auburn in 2017 as a redshirt junior, compiling a 7–4 record and a 2.41 ERA in 15 starts.

== Professional career ==
=== Chicago Cubs ===
Thompson was selected by the Chicago Cubs in the third round of the 2017 Major League Baseball draft. He signed with the Cubs for $511,900. After signing, Thompson made his professional debut with the Eugene Emeralds where he was 1–2 with a 2.37 ERA in 19 innings pitched. He began 2018 with the Myrtle Beach Pelicans, with whom he was named the Carolina League Pitcher of the Week twice. After compiling a 3–3 record with a 3.19 ERA in 12 starts, he was promoted to the Tennessee Smokies in June. He spent the remainder of the season with the Smokies, going 6–3 with a 4.06 ERA in 13 starts.

Thompson returned to Tennessee to begin the 2019 season. He experienced elbow soreness. He was placed on the injured list in April with an elbow injury, and only made two rehab appearances during the remaining months of the season. He was selected to play in the Arizona Fall League for the Mesa Solar Sox following the season. There, he was 1–1 with a 4.62 ERA in seven starts.

Thompson did not play a minor league game in 2020 due to the cancellation of the minor league season caused by the COVID-19 pandemic. On November 20, 2020, the Cubs added him to their 40-man roster to protect him from the Rule 5 draft.

On May 1, 2021, Thompson was promoted to the major leagues for the first time. He made his MLB debut the next day, pitching a shutout inning of relief against the Cincinnati Reds. On May 8, he recorded his first win after pitching three innings of relief against the Pittsburgh Pirates. He was put on the 10-day injured list at the end of the season with right shoulder inflammation and soreness. For his 2021 rookie year with the Cubs, he went 3–3 with a 3.38 ERA, 55 strikeouts, and 31 walks over 53 1/3 innings.

On April 9, 2022, Thompson was ejected for throwing at Andrew McCutchen of the Milwaukee Brewers. Thompson was also fined and suspended for three games. On September 29, Thompson earned his second career save after tossing three scoreless innings of relief against the Philadelphia Phillies. In 29 games (17 starts), he posted a 10–5 record and 3.76 ERA with 108 strikeouts across 115 innings pitched.

In 2023, Thompson made 19 appearances out of the bullpen for Chicago, recording a 4.71 ERA with 26 strikeouts across 28 2/3 innings of work. He was optioned to the Triple–A Iowa Cubs to begin the 2024 season. In 24 appearances for Chicago, Thompson compiled a 2–1 record and 2.67 ERA with 36 strikeouts and 2 saves across 30 1/3 innings pitched.

Thompson was designated for assignment by the Cubs on March 17, 2025. He cleared waivers and was sent outright to Triple-A Iowa on March 25. Thompson made 33 appearances (five starts) for Iowa, compiling a 6–2 record and 4.50 ERA with 83 strikeouts over 64 innings of work. He elected free agency on October 14.

=== Colorado Rockies ===
On November 4, 2025, Thompson signed a one-year, major league contract with the Cincinnati Reds. He was designated for assignment following the signing of JJ Bleday on December 27.

On January 7, 2026, Thompson was claimed off waivers by the Colorado Rockies. On March 25, Thompson was designated for assignment by Colorado after failing to make the team's Opening Day roster. He cleared waivers and was sent outright to the Triple-A Albuquerque Isotopes the same day. Thompson made 11 appearances (five starts) for Albuquerque, tallying a 1–3 record and 3.34 ERA with 19 strikeouts across 32 1/3 innings pitched. On May 20, the Rockies selected Thompson's contract, adding him to their active roster. In five appearances for Colorado, he struggled to an 8.25 ERA with 11 strikeouts over 12 innings of work. Thompson was designated for assignment by the Rockies following the promotion of Cole Carrigg on June 9. He cleared waivers and was sent outright to Albuquerque the following day. He elected free agency on November 2.
