= Ryan Kellogg =

Canadian baseball player (born 1994)

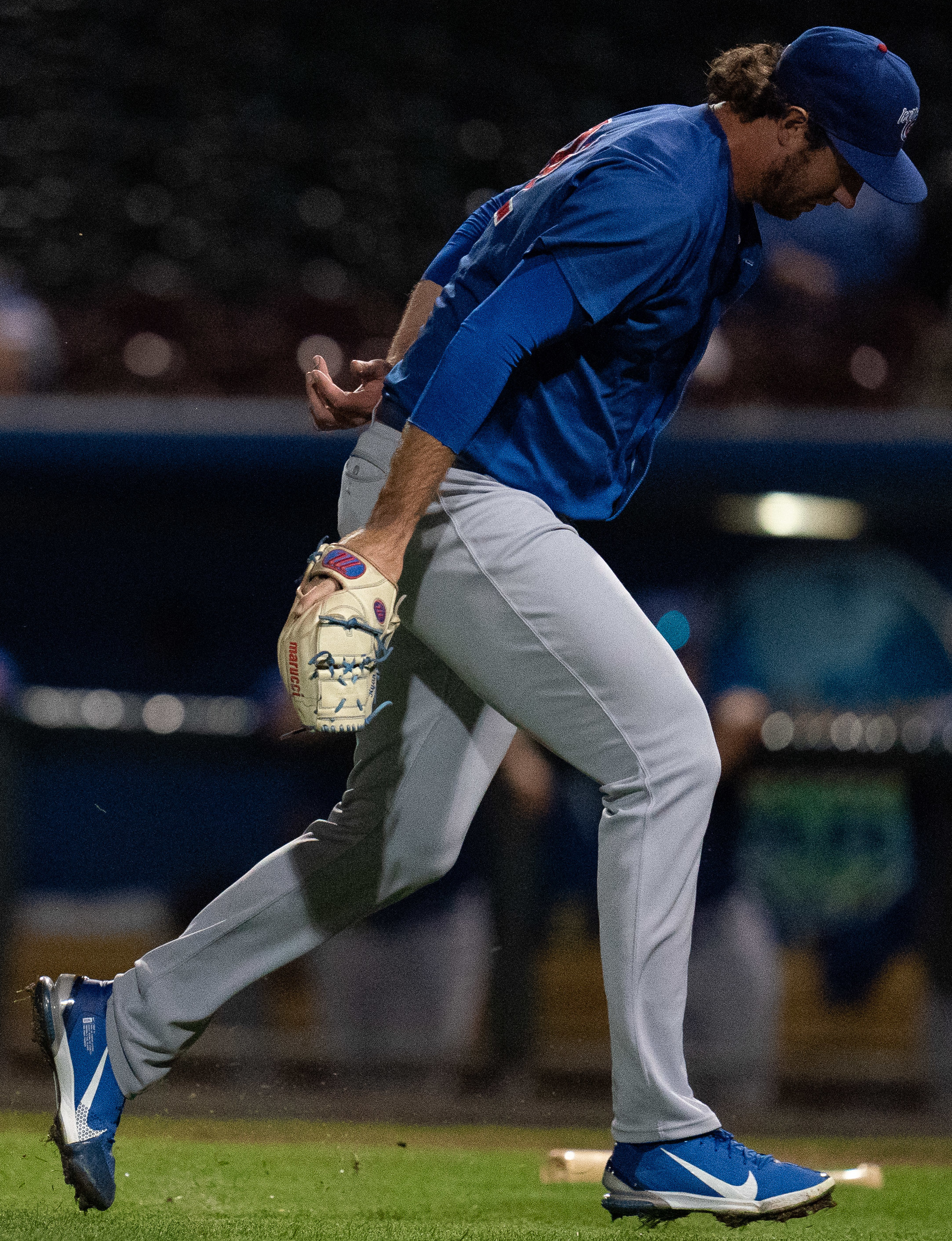
- Kellogg with the Iowa Cubs in 2021

Savannah Bananas – No. 49
- Pitcher / Coach
- Born: February 4, 1994 (age 32); Whitby, Ontario, Canada
- Bats: Right Throws: Left
- Stats at Baseball Reference
Medals
Men's baseball
Representing Canada
18U Baseball World Championship
Silver medal – second place	2012 Seoul	Team
Pan American Games
Silver medal – second place	2019 Lima	National team

Ryan Andrew Kellogg (born February 4, 1994) is a Canadian professional baseball coach and former pitcher who is the pitching coach of the Savannah Bananas.

== Professional career ==
Kellogg was drafted by the Toronto Blue Jays in the 12th round of the 2012 MLB draft out of Henry Street High School in Whitby, Ontario but did not sign. He attended Arizona State University, and in 2013 he played collegiate summer baseball for the Bourne Braves of the Cape Cod Baseball League, where he was named a league all-star.

=== Chicago Cubs ===
Kellogg was drafted by the Chicago Cubs in the 5th round of the 2015 MLB draft. Kellogg signed with Chicago and was assigned to the Low-A Eugene Emeralds, where he spent the whole season, posting an 0–1 record with a 4.98 ERA in 21.1 innings pitched. In 2016, he pitched for the Single-A South Bend Cubs where he pitched to a 9–7 record with a 3.03 ERA and a 1.08 WHIP in 24 games (23 starts).

In 2017, Kellogg spent the season with the High-A Myrtle Beach Pelicans where he struggled, going 5–7 with a 5.12 ERA in 23 games (twenty starts). In 2018, Kellogg returned to Myrtle Beach, where he moved to the bullpen, compiling a 3–1 record with a 3.58 ERA in 37 relief appearances. In 2019, Kellogg remained in Myrtle Beach for a third straight season, registering a 2–8 record and 4.54 ERA with 48 strikeouts in 23 appearances.

He did not play in a game in 2020 due to the cancellation of the Minor League Baseball season because of the COVID-19 pandemic. On April 20, 2021, Kellogg was released by the Cubs. On May 3, Kellogg re-signed with the Cubs on a minor league contract. In 2021, Kellogg played in 20 games between the Double-A Tennessee Smokies and the Triple-A Iowa Cubs, recording a 4.62 ERA with 42 strikeouts in 64 innings of work. Kellogg elected free agency following the season on November 7, 2021.

=== Wild Health Genomes ===
On March 30, 2022, Kellogg signed with the Wild Health Genomes of the Atlantic League of Professional Baseball. In 20 appearances (16 starts) for the Genomes, he compiled an 8–5 record and 5.99 ERA with 83 strikeouts across 91 2/3 innings pitched. Kellogg became a free agent after the season.

== International career ==
Kellogg was selected as a member of the Canada national baseball team at the 2011 Pan American Games, 2012 18U Baseball World Championship, 2017 World Baseball Classic, 2019 Pan American Games Qualifier, and 2019 Pan American Games.
