= Chris Okey =

American baseball player (born 1994)

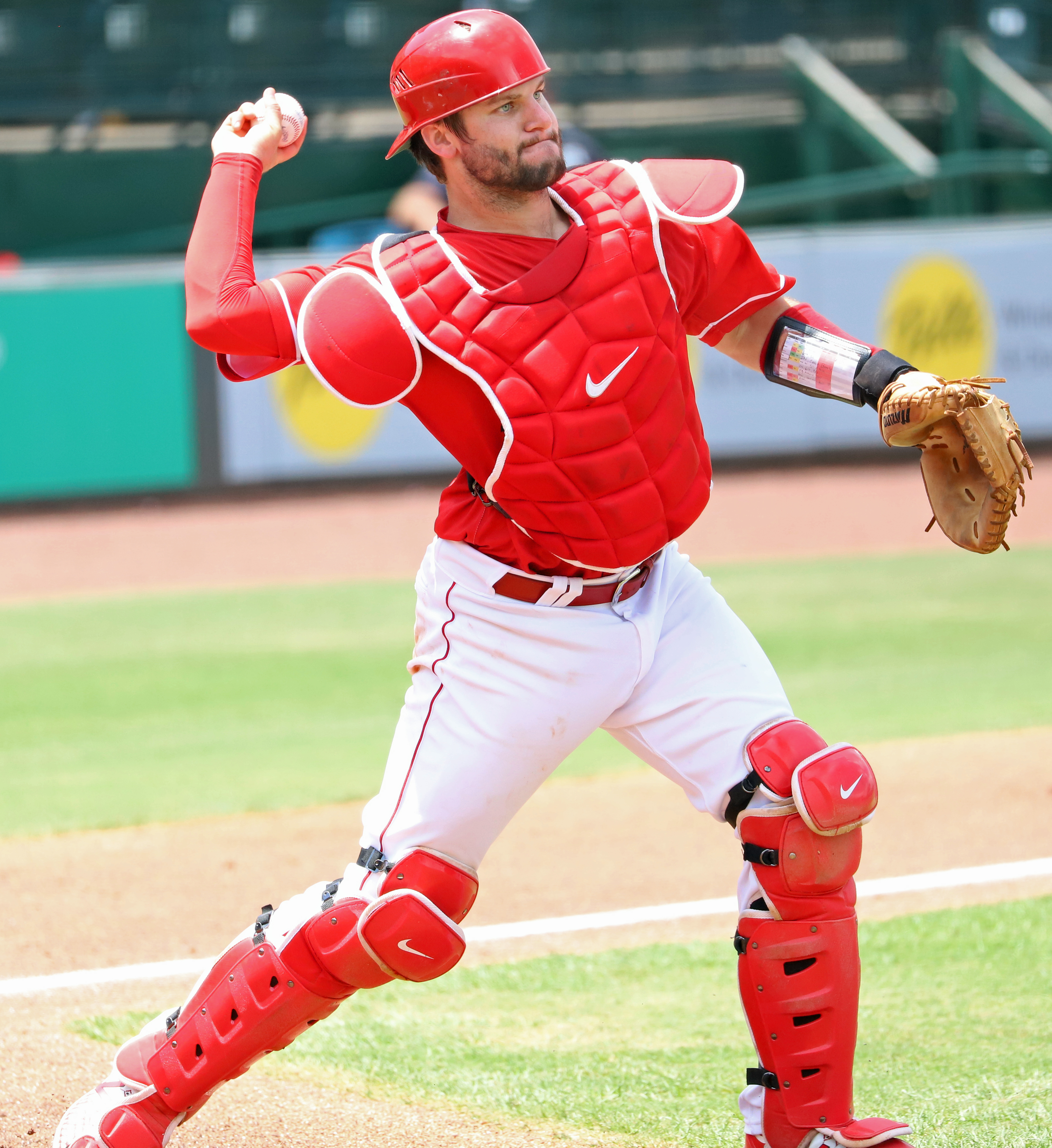
- Okey with the Louisville Bats in 2021

Free agent
- Catcher
- Born: December 29, 1994 (age 31); Altamonte Springs, Florida, U.S.
- Bats: Right Throws: Right

MLB debut
- June 10, 2022, for the Cincinnati Reds

MLB statistics (through 2023 season)
- Batting average: .143
- Home runs: 0
- Runs batted in: 0
- Stats at Baseball Reference

Teams
- Cincinnati Reds (2022); Los Angeles Angels (2023)
Medals
Men's baseball
Representing United States
WBSC Premier12
Bronze medal – third place	2024 Tokyo	Team
U-18 World Cup
Gold medal – first place	2012 Seoul	Team

Christopher Campbell Okey (born December 29, 1994) is an American professional baseball catcher who is a free agent. He has previously played in Major League Baseball (MLB) for the Cincinnati Reds and Los Angeles Angels. He played college baseball for the Clemson Tigers of Clemson University.

== Amateur career ==
Okey attended Eustis High School in Eustis, Florida. Playing for the school's baseball team, Okey was a four-year letterman. He also played for the United States national youth baseball team. In his senior year, Okey had a .411 batting average with four home runs and 29 runs batted in (RBIs). The San Diego Padres selected Okey in the 31st round of the 2013 Major League Baseball draft, but he did not sign.

Okey enrolled at Clemson University in order to play college baseball for the Clemson Tigers. He split time during his freshman year between catcher and designated hitter. As a freshman, Okey batted .248 with four home runs, and 41 RBIs in 61 games played. In 2015, his sophomore year, Okey started at catcher in all of the Tigers' 61 games, and had a .315 batting average and led the team with 12 home runs and 57 RBIs. He was named to the All-Atlantic Coast Conference team, an All-American, and a semifinalist for the Johnny Bench Award. In 2016, Baseball America rated Okey as the 25th-best college prospect available in the 2016 Major League Baseball draft. He was named a Preseason All-American before the 2016 season.

== Professional career ==
=== Cincinnati Reds ===
The Cincinnati Reds selected Okey in the second round, with the 43rd overall selection, of the 2016 draft. Okey signed with the Reds, receiving a reported $2 million signing bonus, and made his professional debut with the Billings Mustangs of the Rookie-level Pioneer League. After playing in nine games for Billings, he was promoted to the Dayton Dragons of the Single-A Midwest League. Okey finished the 2016 season with a .227 batting average, six home runs and 22 RBIs in 51 games.

Okey spent the 2017 season with the Daytona Tortugas of the High-A Florida State League, posting a .185 batting average with three home runs, 28 RBIs, and a .514 OPS in 93 games. He began 2018 with Daytona before being promoted to the Pensacola Blue Wahoos of the Double-A Southern League. In 86 games between the two clubs, Okey slashed .199/.259/.315 with seven home runs and 29 RBIs. He split the 2019 with the Chattanooga Lookouts of the Double-A Southern League and the Louisville Bats of the Triple-A International League, batting .209 with seven home runs and 28 RBIs over 58 games. The Reds invited Okey to spring training as a non-roster player in 2020. After the cancellation of the 2020 season, Okey played for Louisville in 2021 and returned there in 2022. On June 4, 2022, while playing for Louisville, Okey hit for the cycle in an 11–3 victory over the Gwinnett Stripers. He became the 7th player in Bats history to do so.

The Reds promoted Okey to the major leagues on June 10, 2022, following an injury to regular catcher Tyler Stephenson. He made his major league debut that same day as a defensive substitute for Aramis Garcia in a 2–0 loss to the St. Louis Cardinals. On June 13, Okey collected his first career hit, slapping a single up the middle off of Arizona Diamondbacks starter Merrill Kelly.

The Reds optioned Okey back to Louisville on June 29 and designated him for assignment on July 5. Okey cleared waivers and was sent outright to Triple-A on July 6. He was released on August 13.

=== Los Angeles Angels ===
On March 30, 2023, Okey signed a minor league contract with the Los Angeles Angels. He played in 13 games for the Triple-A Salt Lake Bees, hitting .125/.205/.225. On May 9, Okey had his contract selected to the active roster after Chad Wallach was placed on the concussion injured list. He was subsequently slotted into the starting lineup in that day's game against the Houston Astros. He went hitless in two games for the Angels before he was designated for assignment on June 24. On June 26, Okey cleared waivers and was sent outright to Triple–A. On October 10, he elected free agency.

=== Los Angeles Dodgers ===
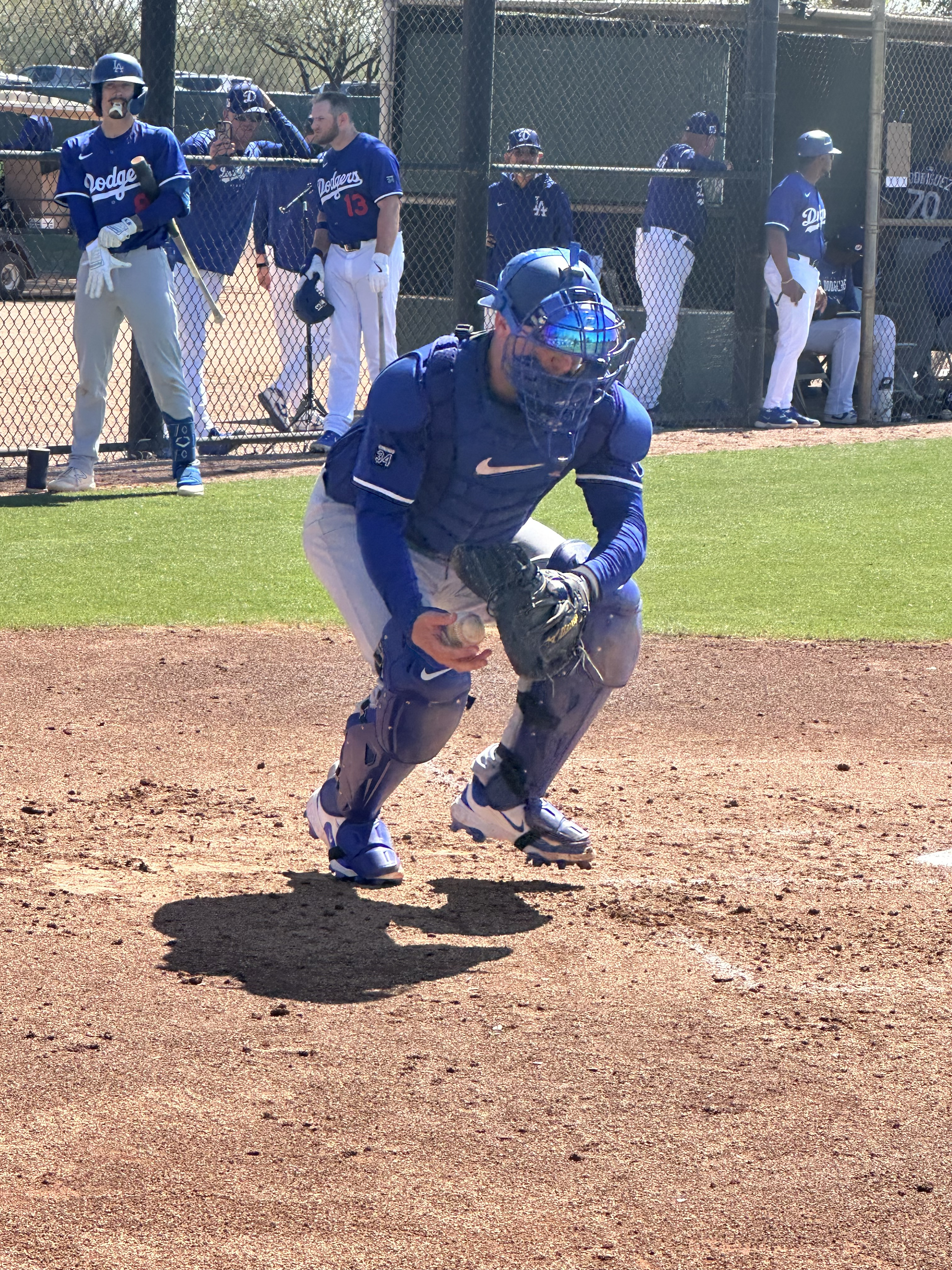
Chris Okey with the Los Angeles Dodgers in 2025 spring training

On January 3, 2024, Okey signed a minor league contract with the Los Angeles Dodgers and he was assigned to the Triple–A Oklahoma City Baseball Club to start the season. He played in 45 games, batting .236/.283/.327 with two home runs, 13 RBI, and four stolen bases. Okey elected free agency following the season on November 4.

On January 24, 2025, Okey re-signed with the Dodgers organization on a new minor league contract. He returned to Oklahoma City, newly rebranded as the Comets, and batted .228/.280/.336 with three home runs and 23 RBI in 42 games. Okey elected free agency following the season on November 6.

== Personal life ==
Okey's father, Chuck, played college football at Presbyterian College. His mother, Kim, was a cheerleader for Clemson. He has two older brothers, Chase and Mitch.
