= Ian Clarkin =

American baseball player (born 1995)

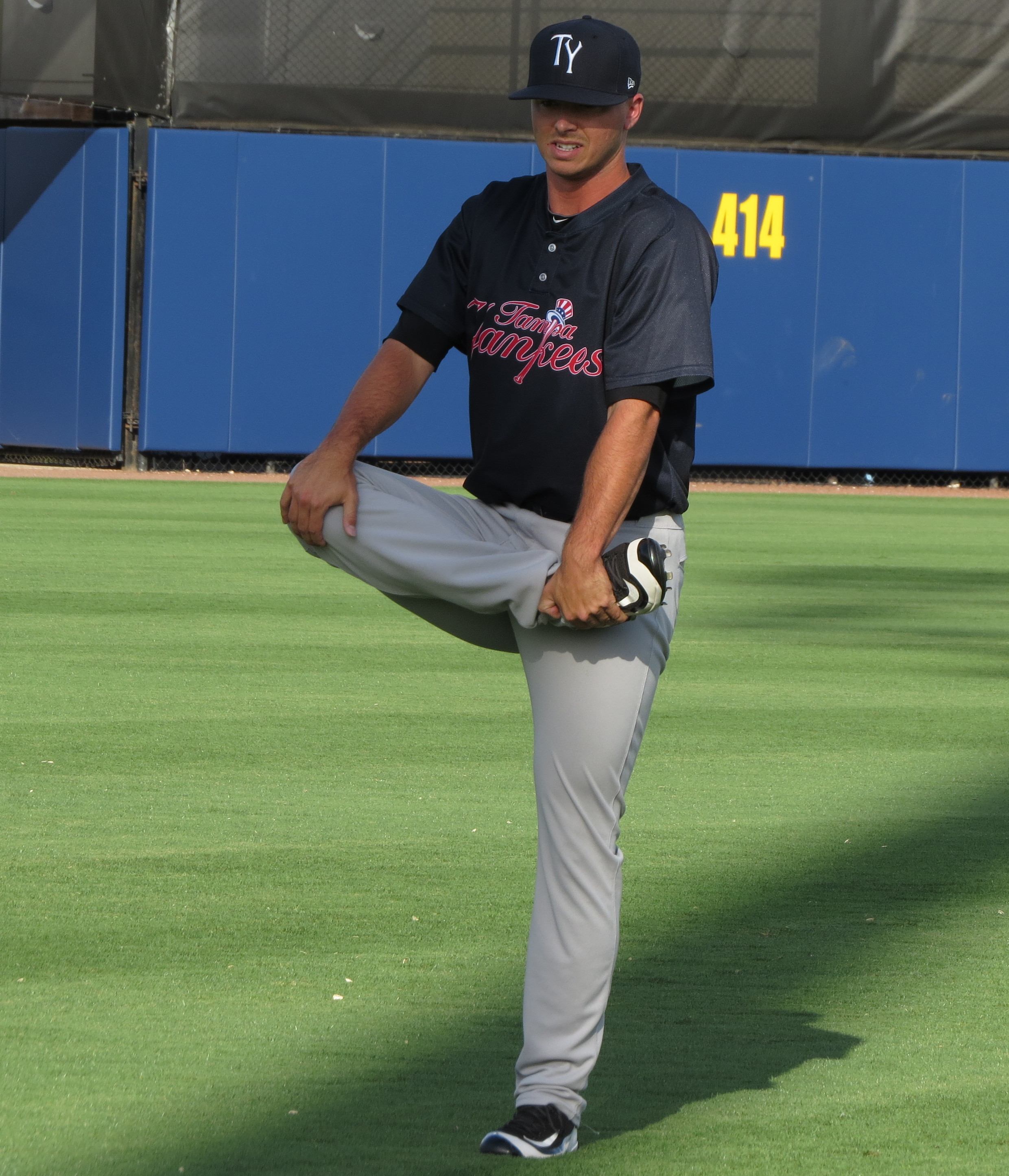
- Clarkin with the Tampa Yankees
- Pitcher
- Born: February 14, 1995 (age 31); San Diego, California, U.S.
- Bats: Left Throws: Left
- Stats at Baseball Reference
Medals
Men's baseball
Representing United States
18U Baseball World Championship
Gold medal – first place	2012 Seoul	Team

Ian Richard Clarkin (born February 14, 1995) is an American former professional baseball pitcher. He was drafted by the New York Yankees with the 33rd overall pick in the 2013 MLB draft. Despite spending time on the 40-man roster of the Chicago White Sox, he never played in Major League Baseball (MLB).

== Career ==
=== New York Yankees ===
Clarkin was drafted by the New York Yankees 33rd overall in the 2013 MLB draft out of James Madison High School in San Diego, California. On June 17, 2013, the Yankees signed him with a slot-money deal worth $1,650,100. He made his professional debut that season with the Gulf Coast League Yankees where he pitched to a 10.80 ERA in five innings. In 2014, he was considered the team's 8th best prospect, according to MLB.com. Clarkin played for the Charleston RiverDogs where he pitched to a 3–3 record and 3.21 ERA in 16 games (15 starts) along with playing one game for the Tampa Yankees at the end of the season. He missed the entire 2015 season due to an elbow injury. He returned in 2016 and pitched for Tampa, posting a 6–9 record, 3.31 ERA, and 1.33 WHIP in 18 starts. He suffered a meniscus tear in his knee that required surgery, ending his season in July. Clarkin began 2017 back with Tampa, missing three weeks to shoulder soreness.

=== Chicago White Sox ===
Clarkin was traded on July 18, 2017, along with Tyler Clippard and Blake Rutherford in exchange for Todd Frazier, David Robertson, and Tommy Kahnle. Chicago assigned him to the Winston-Salem Dash and he finished the season there. After one start, he suffered an oblique strain. When he returned, Clarkin introduced a cutter in order to generate more ground balls. In 18 games (17 starts) between Tampa and Winston-Salem, he was 4–5 with a 2.60 ERA.

On November 20, 2017, the White Sox added Clarkin to their 40-man roster to protect him from the Rule 5 draft. He pitched the majority of the 2018 season with the Double-A Birmingham Barons, making 18 appearances (10 starts) and finishing with a 4–5 record and 5.64 ERA over 68 2/3 innings pitched. He missed a month of playing time to a groin strain and was briefly demoted to High-A.

=== Chicago Cubs ===
On November 20, 2018, Clarkin was claimed off waivers by the Chicago Cubs. On November 26, he was claimed back off waivers by the White Sox. The White Sox designated Clarkin for assignment again on January 8, 2019, following the signing of Kelvin Herrera. The Cubs claimed Clarkin back off waivers on January 16. On February 1, he cleared waivers and was outrighted off the 40-man roster. Clarkin attended big league spring training as a non-roster invitee. He appeared in 10 games for the Double-A Tennessee Smokies, posting a 0–0 record and 3.38 ERA. After missing time to two separate injuries, he was released on June 21, 2019.

=== San Diego Padres ===
On March 4, 2020, Clarkin signed a minor league contract with the San Diego Padres. He did not play in a game in 2020 due to the cancellation of the minor league season because of the COVID-19 pandemic. Clarkin was released by the organization on May 27.

=== Team Texas ===
In July 2020, Clarkin signed on to play for Team Texas of the Constellation Energy League (a makeshift 4-team independent league created as a result of the COVID-19 pandemic) for the 2020 season.

=== Colorado Rockies ===
On November 24, 2020, Clarkin signed a minor league contract with the Colorado Rockies organization. He split the 2021 season between the Double-A Hartford Yard Goats and the Triple-A Albuquerque Isotopes, struggling immensely to a 3-7 record and 7.86 ERA with 32 strikeouts in 68 2/3 innings pitched. He elected free agency following the season on November 7, 2021.

=== Long Island Ducks ===
On February 3, 2023, Clarkin signed a minor league contract with the Seattle Mariners organization after a year of inactivity. He was released by the Mariners on March 31.

On April 18, 2023, Clarkin signed with the Long Island Ducks of the Atlantic League of Professional Baseball. In 16 starts for Long Island, Clarkin posted a 3–5 record and 5.56 ERA with 84 strikeouts across 79 1/3 innings of work.

=== Charros de Jalisco ===
On April 10, 2024, Clarkin signed with the Charros de Jalisco of the Mexican League. In 6 appearances for Jalisco, Clarkin logged a 5.40 ERA with 6 strikeouts across 5 innings pitched.

=== Arizona Diamondbacks ===
On April 28, 2024, Clarkin signed a minor league contract with the Arizona Diamondbacks. In 6 games for the Triple–A Reno Aces, he struggled to a 10.00 ERA with 12 strikeouts across 9 innings pitched. On May 30, Clarkin was released by the Diamondbacks organization.

=== Charros de Jalisco (second stint) ===
On June 13, 2024, Clarkin re–signed with the Charros de Jalisco of the Mexican League. In 12 total games for Jalisco in 2024, Clarkin struggled to a 9.88 ERA with 21 strikeouts across 13 2/3 innings pitched.

=== Cleburne Railroaders ===
On August 15, 2024, Clarkin signed with the Cleburne Railroaders of the American Association of Professional Baseball. In 3 games (2 starts) for the Railroaders, he recorded a 1.00 ERA with 10 strikeouts over 9 innings of work. He became a free agent following the season.
