= Colombia national under-18 baseball team =

Colombia Baseball U-18

Information
- Country: Colombia
- Confederation: WBSC Americas

WBSC ranking
- Current: 14 ▼1 (26 October 2026)

The Colombia National Under-18 Baseball Team is the national under-18 team representing Colombia in international baseball competitions. The organization is currently ranked 11th in the world by the World Baseball Softball Confederation. They compete in the bi-annual U-18 Baseball World Cup.

== See also ==
- Colombia national baseball team
- U-18 Baseball World Cup
