= Fernando Romero (baseball) =

Dominican baseball player (born 1994)

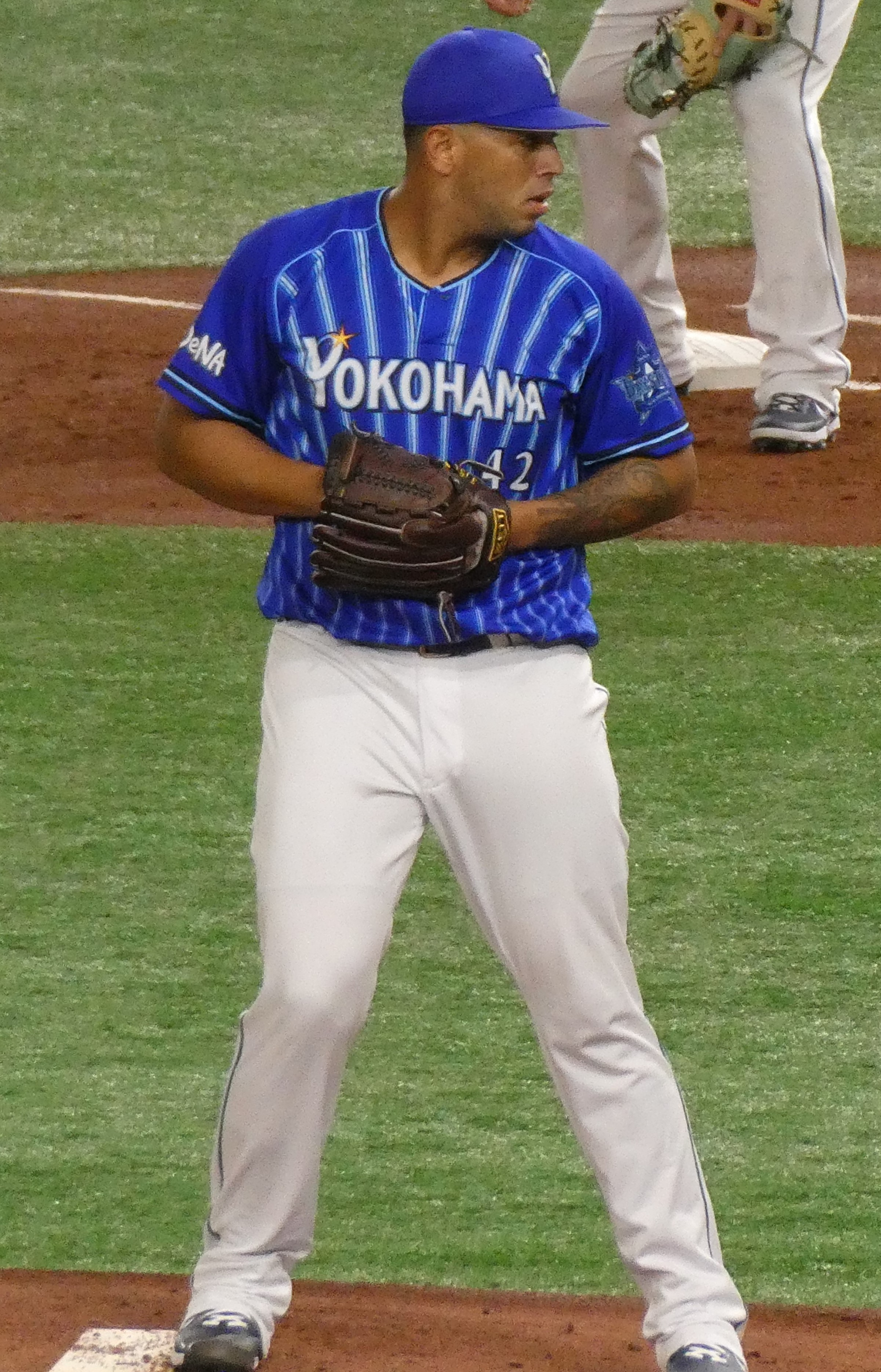
- Romero with the Yokohama DeNA Baystars
- Pitcher
- Born: December 24, 1994 (age 31); San Juan de la Maguana, Dominican Republic
- Batted: Right Threw: Right

Professional debut
- MLB: May 2, 2018, for the Minnesota Twins
- NPB: May 8, 2021, for the Yokohama DeNA BayStars

Last appearance
- MLB: September 29, 2019, for the Minnesota Twins
- NPB: October 2, 2022, for the Yokohama DeNA BayStars

MLB statistics
- Win–loss record: 3–4
- Earned run average: 5.17
- Strikeouts: 63

NPB statistics
- Win–loss record: 11-11
- Earned run average: 4.01
- Strikeouts: 98
- Stats at Baseball Reference

Teams
- Minnesota Twins (2018–2019); Yokohama DeNA BayStars (2021–2022)

Fernando Ernesto Romero Peralta (born December 24, 1994) is a Dominican former professional baseball pitcher. He has previously played in Major League Baseball (MLB) for the Minnesota Twins, and in Nippon Professional Baseball (NPB) for the Yokohama DeNA BayStars.

== Career ==
=== Minnesota Twins ===
Romero signed with the Minnesota Twins as an international free agent in November 2011. He made his professional debut in 2012 with the Dominican Summer League Twins and spent the whole season there, going 1–4 with a 4.65 ERA in 31 innings. He pitched 2013 with the Gulf Coast Twins where he was 2–0 with a 1.60 ERA in 45 innings. Romero began 2014 with the Cedar Rapids Kernels but suffered a partially torn ulnar collateral ligament after only three games which required Tommy John Surgery. The injury ended his 2014 season and caused him to miss the entire 2015 season.

Romero returned from the injury in 2016 and started the year with Cedar Rapids, and after five starts was promoted to the Fort Myers Miracle. Romero ended 2016 with a combined 9–3 record and 1.89 ERA in 16 games started between both clubs.

The Twins added him to their 40-man roster after the 2016 season. He spent 2017 with the Chattanooga Lookouts where he compiled an 11–9 record and 3.53 ERA in 24 games (23 starts). He began 2018 with the Rochester Red Wings.

On May 2, 2018, Romero was called up by the Twins. He made his MLB debut that day as the starting pitcher against the Toronto Blue Jays, pitching 5.2 innings, with zero runs allowed, three walks, and five strikeouts, while earning his first Major League win.

Romero was sent back to the Rochester Red Wings on July 15, following a game in which he was relieved in the fifth inning. He was recalled towards the end of the season, ending the season with a 3–3 record in 55 2/3 innings.

In 2019, Romero logged a 7.07 ERA in 15 appearances with Minnesota. In 2020 Spring Training, Romero was placed on the restricted list with visa issues, and did not play in a game that year. On December 17, 2020, Romero was released by the Twins.

=== Yokohama DeNA BayStars ===
On December 18, 2020, a day after his release from Minnesota, Romero signed a one-year, $724K contract with the Yokohama DeNA BayStars of Nippon Professional Baseball. He became a free agent following the 2022 season.

=== Los Angeles Angels ===
On December 21, 2022, Romero signed a minor league deal with the Los Angeles Angels. He made only four appearances on the year, posting a 10.13 ERA in 8 innings pitched for the rookie–level Arizona Complex League Angels, Double–A Rocket City Trash Pandas, and Triple–A Salt Lake Bees. Romero elected free agency following the season on November 6, 2023.
