= Mokdong Baseball Stadium =

Baseball stadium in Seoul, South Korea

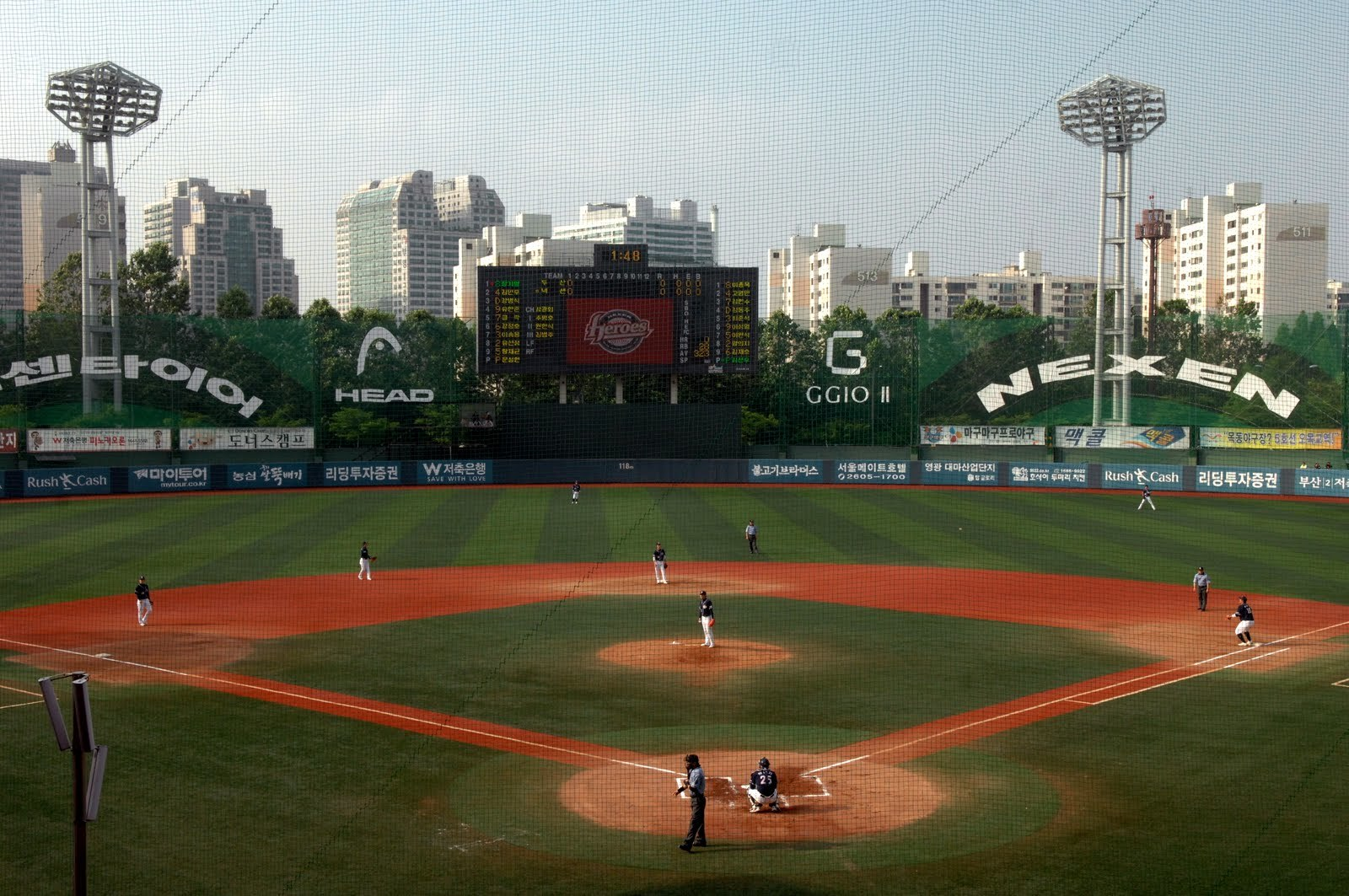
- Interactive map of Mokdong Baseball Stadium
- Location: Yangcheon District, Seoul, South Korea
- Coordinates: 37°31′50.54″N 126°52′51.52″E
- Owner: City of Seoul
- Operator: Seoul Metropolitan Facilities Management Corporation
- Capacity: 10,500
- Surface: Natural grass (1989–2007); FieldTurf (2008–present)
- Field size: Left Field – 98 metres (322 ft); Left-Center – 113 metres (371 ft); Center Field – 118 metres (387 ft); Right-Center – 113 metres (371 ft); Right Field – 98 metres (322 ft); Outfield Wall Height – 2 metres (7 ft)

Construction
- Groundbreaking: June 17, 1987
- Opened: November 14, 1989
- Cost: 7.9 billion won
- Architect: Sungwon Corporation

Tenants
- Nexen Heroes (2008–2015); Seoul Journeyman (2017–present); 2014 Asian Games

Mok-dong Baseball Stadium is a stadium located in Seoul, South Korea. The stadium was the home of the Nexen Heroes of the Korea Baseball Organization between 2008 and 2015. The stadium is part of the Mokdong Sports Complex.

== See also ==
- Mokdong Stadium
- Dongdaemun Baseball Stadium
- Jamsil Baseball Stadium
- Gocheok Sky Dome
