= Stephen Gonsalves =

American baseball player (born 1994)

Conspiradores de Querétaro – No. 59
- Pitcher
- Born: July 8, 1994 (age 31); San Diego, California, U.S.
- Bats: Left Throws: Left

MLB debut
- August 20, 2018, for the Minnesota Twins

MLB statistics (through 2021 season)
- Win–loss record: 2–2
- Earned run average: 6.21
- Strikeouts: 20
- Stats at Baseball Reference

Teams
- Minnesota Twins (2018); Boston Red Sox (2021)
Medals
Men's baseball
Representing United States
18U Baseball World Championship
| Gold medal – first place | 2012 Seoul | Team |

Stephen William Gonsalves (born July 8, 1994) is an American professional baseball pitcher for the Conspiradores de Querétaro of the Mexican League. He has previously played in Major League Baseball (MLB) for the Minnesota Twins and Boston Red Sox. Listed at 6 feet 5 inches (1.96 m) and 218 pounds (99 kg), the throws and bats left-handed.

== Career ==
Gonsalves attended Cathedral Catholic High School in San Diego, California. He was drafted by the Minnesota Twins in the fourth round of the 2013 Major League Baseball draft. He was expected to be selected earlier in the draft, but was suspended from his senior season for nearly a month after lying to his dean to cover for his roommate smoking marijuana. Gonsalves had committed to play college baseball for San Diego.

=== Minnesota Twins ===
Gonsalves signed with the Twins and made his professional debut with the Gulf Coast Twins. He was later promoted to the Elizabethton Twins. He posted a combined 2–1 win–loss record with a 0.95 earned run average (ERA) in eight games between both clubs. In 2014, he pitched for Elizabeton and the Cedar Rapids Kernels where he went 4–3 with a 3.02 ERA in 14 games between both teams. He spent 2015 with Cedar Rapids and the Fort Myers Miracle, where he pitched to a combined 13–3 record with a 2.01 ERA in 24 games.

Pitching for the High-A Fort Myers Miracle and Double-A Chattanooga Lookouts in 2016, Gonsalves was named the Twins Minor league Pitcher of the Year in 2016 after posting a 13–5 record, 2.06 ERA, and 155 strikeouts over his 140 innings in 24 starts. After the season he played in the Arizona Fall League but only appeared in 4 games due to a shoulder strain.

The same injury caused him to miss the start of the 2017 season. He returned to pitch for the Double-A Chattanooga Lookouts and the Triple-A Rochester Red Wings where he went 9–5 with a 3.27 ERA in 20 games. The Twins added him to their 40-man roster after the season. Gonsalves began the 2018 season with Rochester and made his major league debut on August 20, 2018. He lasted for 1.1 innings gave up 6 hits, 4 runs, 2 walks, he also had 3 strikeouts, and ended that game with an ERA of 27.00. He finished the season winning 2 games and losing 2. He played in 7 games and had an ERA of 6.57.

Gonsalves was slated to begin the 2019 season pitching for Triple-A Rochester but was placed on the injured list with an arm injury before the season began. After one start, he was returned to the injured list on May 25, 2019. Gonsalves began a rehab assignment in the Gulf Coast League on August 10, 2019.

=== New York Mets ===
On November 4, 2019, Gonsalves was claimed off waivers by the New York Mets. He was designated for assignment on July 23, 2020.

=== Boston Red Sox ===
Gonsalves was claimed off waivers by the Boston Red Sox on July 25, 2020. The Red Sox designated Gonsalves for assignment on August 19; he was sent outright to the team's alternate training site on August 26. In early November 2020, he was re-signed by the Red Sox to a minor-league deal. He began the 2021 season in Triple-A with the Worcester Red Sox. On August 31, Gonsalves was promoted to Boston's major-league roster, pitching in relief that evening against the Tampa Bay Rays. He was returned to Triple-A on September 13 and removed from the 40-man roster.

=== Chicago Cubs ===
On December 3, 2021, Gonsalves signed a minor league contract with the Chicago Cubs. In 2022, he made 8 appearances for the Triple–A Iowa Cubs, logging a 4.26 ERA. In 2023, Gonsalves split the season between Iowa, the High–A South Bend Cubs, Single–A Myrtle Beach Pelicans, and rookie–level Arizona Complex League Cubs, accumulating a 5.72 ERA with 44 strikeouts across 22 games. He elected free agency following the season on November 6, 2023.

=== Los Angeles Dodgers ===
On January 17, 2024, Gonsalves signed a minor league contract with the Los Angeles Dodgers and was assigned to the Triple-A Oklahoma City Baseball Club to start the season. In 15 appearances for Oklahoma city, he struggled to a 6.00 ERA with 23 strikeouts across 18 innings of work. On May 24, Gonsalves was released by the Dodgers organization.

=== Colorado Rockies ===
On May 28, 2024, Gonsalves signed a minor league contract with the Colorado Rockies. In 17 appearances for the Triple–A Albuquerque Isotopes, he struggled to a 7.41 ERA with 23 strikeouts over 17 innings of work. Gonsalves was released by the Rockies organization on August 6.

=== Charros de Jalisco ===
On April 19, 2025, Gonsalves signed with the Charros de Jalisco of the Mexican League. In 37 appearances (two starts), he posted a 6–0 record with a 2.61 ERA, 42 strikeouts, and 26 walks across 38 innings pitched.

Gonsalves made 14 relief appearances for Jalisco in 2026, posting a 1–0 record with a 3.55 ERA, 20 strikeouts, and 10 walks in 12 2/3 innings pitched.

=== Conspiradores de Querétaro ===
On June 8, 2026, Gonsalves and Aaron McGarity were traded to the Conspiradores de Querétaro of the Mexican League in exchange for Reymin Guduan.
