= Gabriel Moya (baseball) =

Venezuelan baseball player (born 1995)

- Pitcher
- Born: January 9, 1995 (age 30); Cabimas, Venezuela
- Batted: Left Threw: Left

MLB debut
- September 12, 2017, for the Minnesota Twins

Last MLB appearance
- September 29, 2018, for the Minnesota Twins

MLB statistics
- Win–loss record: 3–1
- Earned run average: 4.64
- Strikeouts: 36
- Stats at Baseball Reference

Teams
- Minnesota Twins (2017–2018)

Gabriel Jose Moya (born January 9, 1995) is a Venezuelan former professional baseball pitcher. He has previously played in Major League Baseball (MLB) for the Minnesota Twins. He signed with the Arizona Diamondbacks as an international free agent in 2012.

== Career ==
=== Arizona Diamondbacks ===
Moya signed with the Arizona Diamondbacks as an international free agent on March 27, 2012. He made his professional debut with the Dominican Summer League Diamondbacks, pitching to a 2.55 ERA in 15 appearances. He returned to the DSL Diamondbacks the following year, pitching in 19 games and recording a 1.50 ERA with 33 strikeouts in 30.0 innings. In 2014, Moya played for the rookie ball Missoula Osprey, registering a 5-4 record and 6.00 ERA in 15 games. He returned to Missoula for the 2015 season, and recorded a 1.93 ERA with 36 strikeouts in 25 appearances. In 2016, Moya split the year between the High-A Visalia Rawhide and the Single-A Kane County Cougars, posting a 6-1 record and 1.55 ERA in 52 appearances between the two teams. He began the 2017 season with the Double-A Jackson Generals.

=== Minnesota Twins ===
On July 27, 2017, Moya was traded from the Diamondbacks to the Minnesota Twins in exchange for John Ryan Murphy. He was assigned to the Double-A Chattanooga Lookouts, and posted an 0.61 ERA in 13 appearances for the team. On September 12, 2017, Moya was selected to the 40-man roster and promoted to the major leagues for the first time. He made his MLB debut that day, pitching a shutout inning against the San Diego Padres. In 7 appearances in 2017, Moya logged a 4.26 ERA with 5 strikeouts. The next season, he split time between the Triple-A Rochester Red Wings and the Twins, appearing in 35 games, 6 of them starts, posting a 4.71 ERA. He was 3-1 in 36 1/3 innings. He began the 2019 season with Rochester, but on June 25, 2019, Moya was designated for assignment by Minnesota. He spent the remainder of the year in Triple-A and elected free agency on November 4, 2019.

=== Lancaster Barnstormers ===
On May 31, 2021, Moya signed with the Lancaster Barnstormers of the Atlantic League of Professional Baseball. He made 44 appearances for Lancaster, compiling a 3-1 record and 2.36 ERA with 51 strikeouts across 45 2/3 innings pitched. Moya became a free agent following the season.

=== Wild Health Genomes ===
On July 1, 2022, Moya signed with the Wild Health Genomes of the Atlantic League of Professional Baseball. He was released on August 29, after struggling through 16 games, going 0-2 with a 10.34 ERA and 18 strikeouts in 15 2/3 innings.
