= 2018 Kansas City Royals season =

2018 Kansas City Royals
- League: American League
- Division: Central
- Ballpark: Kauffman Stadium
- City: Kansas City, Missouri
- Record: 58–104 (.358)
- Divisional place: 5th
- Owners: David Glass
- General managers: Dayton Moore
- Managers: Ned Yost
- Television: Fox Sports Kansas City (Ryan Lefebvre, Jeff Montgomery, Rex Hudler, Steve Physioc)
- Radio: KCSP 610 AM (Denny Matthews, Steve Stewart, Rex Hudler, Ryan Lefebvre, Steve Physioc, Jeff Montgomery)

The 2018 Kansas City Royals season was their 50th season for the franchise, and their 46th at Kauffman Stadium. They significantly failed to improve upon their 80–82 record the previous year, reaching 100+ losses for the first time since 2006 and finishing 58–104, the second-worst record in the 2018 MLB season, ahead of only the Baltimore Orioles, who finished 47–115.

== Offseason ==
=== Transactions ===
- November 2, 2017: 1B Eric Hosmer, 3B Mike Moustakas, RHP Peter Moylan, LHP Jason Vargas, RHP Trevor Cahill, RF Melky Cabrera, CF Lorenzo Cain, and SS Alcides Escobar elected free agency. Activated RHP Nate Karns, LHP Brian Flynn, CF Bubba Starling, and RHP Miguel Almonte from the 60-day disabled list.
- November 3, 2017: LHP Mike Minor elected free agency.
- November 20, 2017: Selected the contract of C Meibrys Viloria from Lexington Legends. Selected the contract of LHP Tim Hill from Northwest Arkansas Naturals. Selected the contract of LHP Eric Stout from Omaha Storm Chasers.
- December 1, 2017: LF Terrance Gore elected free agency.
- December 2, 2017: Signed free agent LF Terrance Gore to a minor league contract and invited him to spring training.
- December 5, 2017: Signed free agent RHP Wily Peralta.
- December 7, 2017: Signed free agent RHP Scott Barlow.
- December 8, 2017: Seattle Mariners claim Mike Morin off waivers.
- December 14, 2017: New York Mets traded RHP Burch Smith for Future Considerations. Cincinnati Reds traded RHP Brad Keller for Future Considerations.
- December 15, 2017: Signed free agent RHP Mike Broadway to a minor league contract. Signed free agent DH Cody Asche to a minor league contract and invited him to spring training.
- January 4, 2018: Chicago White Sox traded 2B Jake Peter to Los Angeles Dodgers; Dodgers traded cash, RHP Joakim Soria and LHP Luis Avilan to White Sox; Dodgers traded SS Erick Mejia and RHP Trevor Oaks to Royals; Royals traded RHP Joakim Soria and LHP Scott Alexander to Dodgers.
- January 12, 2018: Signed free agent SS Guillermo Fernandez to a minor league contract.
- January 13, 2018: Signed free agent RHP Luis Barroso to a minor league contract.
- January 16, 2018: Signed free agent RHP Clayton Mortensen and OF Tyler Collins to minor league contracts. Collins invited to spring training.
- January 25, 2018: Signed free agent SS Ryan Goins to a minor league contract and invited him to spring training.

== Regular season ==
=== Game log ===
2018 game log: 58–104 (Home: 32–49; Away: 26–55)
March: 0–2 (Home: 0–2; Away: none)

#	Date	Opponent	Score	Win	Loss	Save	Attendance	Record	Streak
1	March 29	White Sox	7–14	Shields (1–0)	**Duffy** (0–1)	—	36,517	0–1	L1
2	March 31	White Sox	3–4	Farquhar (1–0)	**Maurer** (0–1)	Soria (1)	37,093	0–2	L2

April: 7–19 (Home: 3–10; Away: 4–9)

#	Date	Opponent	Score	Win	Loss	Save	Attendance	Record	Streak
—	April 1	White Sox	**Postponed (snow)** (Rescheduled for April 28)						
3	April 2	@ Tigers	1–6	Liriano (1–0)	**Hammel** (0–1)	—	15,476	0–3	L3
4	April 3	@ Tigers	1–0	**Junis** (1–0)	Boyd (0–1)	**Herrera** (1)	15,083	1–3	W1
—	April 4	@ Tigers	**Postponed (weather)** (Rescheduled for April 20)						
5	April 6	@ Indians	2–3	Carrasco (2–0)	**Duffy** (0–2)	Allen (2)	34,720	1–4	L1
6	April 7	@ Indians	1–0	**Kennedy** (1–0)	Bauer (0–1)	**Herrera** (2)	17,362	2–4	W1
7	April 8	@ Indians	1–3	Allen (1–0)	**Maurer** (0–2)	—	14,240	2–5	L1
8	April 9	Mariners	10–0	**Junis** (2–0)	Gonzales (1–1)	—	12,324	3–5	W1
9	April 10	Mariners	3–8	Hernández (2–1)	**Skoglund** (0–1)	—	14,850	3–6	L1
10	April 11	Mariners	2–4	Vincent (1–0)	**Grimm** (0–1)	Díaz (4)	14,314	3–7	L2
11	April 12	Angels	1–7	Tropeano (1–0)	**Kennedy** (1–1)	—	14,714	3–8	L3
12	April 13	Angels	4–5	Wood (1–0)	**Grimm** (0–2)	Middleton (3)	15,011	3–9	L4
13	April 14	Angels	3–5	Richards (2–0)	**Junis** (2–1)	Middleton (4)	15,876	3–10	L5
—	April 15	Angels	**Postponed (cold)** (Rescheduled for June 25)						
—	April 16	@ Blue Jays	**Postponed (Weather related damage to Rogers Centre roof)** (Rescheduled for April 17)						
14	April 17	@ Blue Jays	3–11	García (2–0)	**Skoglund** (0–2)	—	N/A	3–11	L6
15	April 17	@ Blue Jays	4–5(10)	Clippard (2–0)	**Flynn** (0–1)	—	18,645	3–12	L7
16	April 18	@ Blue Jays	5–15	Happ (3–1)	**Kennedy** (1–2)	—	28,803	3–13	L8
17	April 20	@ Tigers	2–3(10)	Jiménez (2–0)	**Keller** (0–1)	—	15,406	3–14	L9
18	April 20	@ Tigers	3–2	**Junis** (3–1)	Greene (1–1)	**Herrera** (3)	17,194	4–14	W1
19	April 21	@ Tigers	4–12	Fiers (2–1)	**Duffy** (0–3)	Saupold (1)	19,302	4–15	L1
20	April 22	@ Tigers	8–5	**McCarthy** (1–0)	VerHagen (0–1)	**Herrera** (4)	19,034	5–15	W1
21	April 24	Brewers	2–5	Davies (2–2)	**Kennedy** (1–3)	—	16,555	5–16	L1
22	April 25	Brewers	2–6	Chacín (2–1)	**Hammel** (0–2)	—	13,389	5–17	L2
23	April 26	White Sox	3–6	Giolito (1–3)	**Junis** (3–2)	Soria (3)	18,315	5–18	L3
24	April 27	White Sox	4–7(11)	Infante (1–3)	**Hill** (0–1)	Soria (4)	15,395	5–19	L4
25	April 28	White Sox	0–8	Fulmer (2–1)	**Oaks** (0–1)	—	16,971	5–20	L5
26	April 28	White Sox	5–2	**Skoglund** (1–2)	Covey (0–1)	**Herrera** (5)	16,070	6–20	W1
27	April 29	White Sox	5–4	**McCarthy** (2–0)	Rondón (1–1)	**Boyer** (1)	23,892	7–20	W2
28	April 30	@ Red Sox	6–10	Velázquez (4–0)	**Hammel** (0–3)	—	31,314	7–21	L1

May: 13–15 (Home: 6–7; Away: 7–8)

#	Date	Opponent	Score	Win	Loss	Save	Attendance	Record	Streak
29	May 1	@ Red Sox	7–6 (13)	**Herrera** (1–0)	Johnson (1–1)	**Flynn** (1)	34,466	8–21	W1
30	May 2	@ Red Sox	4–5	Pomeranz (1–1)	**Duffy** (0–4)	Kimbrel (8)	32,267	8–22	L1
31	May 3	Tigers	10–6	**McCarthy** (3–0)	Bell (0–1)	—	28,866	9–22	W1
32	May 4	Tigers	4–2	**Boyer** (1–0)	Stumpf (1–1)	**Herrera** (6)	24,648	10–22	W2
33	May 5	Tigers	2–3	Zimmermann (2–0)	**Hammel** (0–4)	Greene (6)	20,708	10–23	L1
34	May 6	Tigers	4–2	**Junis** (4–2)	Boyd (1–3)	**Herrera** (7)	18,424	11–23	W1
35	May 8	@ Orioles	15–7	**Duffy** (1–4)	Bundy (1–5)	—	10,863	12–23	W2
36	May 9	@ Orioles	3–5	Bleier (3–0)	**McCarthy** (3–1)	Brach (4)	14,375	12–24	L1
37	May 10	@ Orioles	6–11	Castro (1–1)	**Kennedy** (1–4)	—	17,842	12–25	L2
38	May 11	@ Indians	10–9	**Keller** (1–1)	Miller (1–1)	**Herrera** (8)	24,408	13–25	W1
39	May 12	@ Indians	2–6	Clevinger (3–0)	**Junis** (4–3)	—	24,587	13–26	L1
40	May 13	@ Indians	2–11	Kluber (6–2)	**Duffy** (1–5)	—	22,105	13–27	L2
41	May 14	Rays	1–2	Yarbrough (3–2)	**Skoglund** (1–3)	Colomé (7)	14,174	13–28	L3
42	May 15	Rays	5–6	Venters (1–0)	**Herrera** (1–1)	Colomé (8)	21,500	13–29	L4
43	May 16	Rays	3–5	Andriese (1–1)	**Hammel** (0–5)	Colomé (9)	19,611	13–30	L5
44	May 18	Yankees	5–2	**Junis** (5–3)	Sabathia (2–1)	**Herrera** (9)	26,433	14–30	W1
45	May 19	Yankees	3–8	Severino (7–1)	**Duffy** (1–6)	—	33,684	14–31	L1
46	May 20	Yankees	1–10	Gray (3–3)	**Skoglund** (1–4)	—	24,121	14–32	L2
47	May 21	@ Cardinals	0–6	Mikolas (6–0)	**Kennedy** (1–5)	—	42,140	14–33	L3
48	May 22	@ Cardinals	5–1	**Hammel** (1–5)	Weaver (3–4)	—	39,545	15–33	W1
49	May 23	@ Cardinals	5–2 (10)	**Boyer** (2–0)	Norris (1–1)	**Herrera** (10)	41,984	16–33	W2
50	May 24	@ Rangers	8–2	**Duffy** (2–6)	Bibens-Dirkx (0–1)	—	23,230	17–33	W3
51	May 25	@ Rangers	4–8	Minor (4–3)	**Skoglund** (1–5)	Kela (11)	35,105	17–34	L1
52	May 26	@ Rangers	3–4 (10)	Claudio (3–2)	**McCarthy** (3–2)	—	29,644	17–35	L2
53	May 27	@ Rangers	5–3	**Hammel** (2–5)	Hamels (3–5)	**Herrera** (11)	31,898	18–35	W1
54	May 28	Twins	5–8	Lynn (3–4)	**Junis** (5–4)	Rodney (11)	18,572	18–36	L1
55	May 29	Twins	2–1 (14)	**Barlow** (1–0)	Rogers (1–2)	—	20,533	19–36	W1
56	May 30	Twins	11–8	**McCarthy** (4–2)	Romero (2–2)	**Herrera** (12)	21,343	20–36	W2

June: 5–21 (Home: 2–10; Away: 3–11)

#	Date	Opponent	Score	Win	Loss	Save	Attendance	Record	Streak
57	June 1	A's	0–16	Montas (2–0)	**Kennedy** (1–6)	—	23,413	20–37	L1
58	June 2	A's	5–4	**Hill** (1–1)	Petit (2–2)	**Herrera** (13)	24,553	21–37	W1
59	June 3	A's	1–5	Trivino (3–0)	**Junis** (5–5)	—	19,424	21–38	L1
60	June 4	@ Angels	6–9	Bedrosian (2–1)	**Hill** (1–2)	Parker (4)	32,553	21–39	L2
61	June 5	@ Angels	0–1	Heaney (3–4)	**Keller** (1–2)	—	31,514	21–40	L3
62	June 6	@ Angels	3–4	Bedrosian (3–1)	**Barlow** (1–1)	Parker (5)	36,512	21–41	L4
63	June 7	@ A's	1–4	Blackburn (1–0)	**Hammel** (2–6)	Treinen (14)	7,963	21–42	L5
64	June 8	@ A's	2–7	Montas (3–0)	**Junis** (5–6)	Trivino (1)	10,132	21–43	L6
65	June 9	@ A's	2–0	**Duffy** (3–6)	Bassitt (0–1)	**Herrera** (14)	16,208	22–43	W1
66	June 10	@ A's	2–3	Treinen (3–1)	**Adam** (0–1)	—	15,548	22–44	L1
67	June 12	Reds	1–5 (10)	Hernandez (2–0)	**McCarthy** (4–3)	—	20,476	22–45	L2
68	June 13	Reds	0–7	Mahle (5–6)	**Hammel** (2–7)	—	24,899	22–46	L3
69	June 15	Astros	3–7	Morton (8–1)	**Junis** (5–7)	—	27,603	22–47	L4
70	June 16	Astros	2–10	Keuchel (4–8)	**Duffy** (3–7)	—	20,637	22–48	L5
71	June 17	Astros	4–7	Sipp (2–0)	**Maurer** (0–3)	Rondón (4)	22,236	22–49	L6
72	June 18	Rangers	3–6	Colón (4–4)	**Kennedy** (1–7)	Kela (16)	18,319	22–50	L7
73	June 19	Rangers	1–4	Hamels (4–6)	**Hammel** (2–8)	Kela (17)	17,789	22–51	L8
74	June 20	Rangers	2–3	Bibens-Dirkx (1–1)	**Junis** (5–8)	Diekman (2)	19,489	22–52	L9
75	June 22	@ Astros	1–0	**Grimm** (1–2)	Giles (0–2)	**Hill** (1)	39,357	23–52	W1
76	June 23	@ Astros	3–4(12)	McHugh (3–0)	**Grimm** (1–3)	—	40,028	23–53	L1
77	June 24	@ Astros	3–11	Cole (9–1)	**Hammel** (2–9)	—	41,823	23–54	L2
78	June 25	Angels	2–0	**Keller** (2–2)	Skaggs (6–5)	**Peralta** (1)	19,535	24–54	W1
79	June 26	@ Brewers	1–5	Peralta (3–0)	**Junis** (5–9)	Hader (7)	34,412	24–55	L1
80	June 27	@ Brewers	5–4	**Duffy** (4–7)	Suter (8–5)	**Peralta** (2)	38,436	25–55	W1
81	June 29	@ Mariners	1–4	Gonzales (8–5)	**Kennedy** (1–8)	—	25,558	25–56	L1
82	June 30	@ Mariners	4–6	Hernández (8–6)	**Hammel** (2–10)	Díaz (31)	33,395	25–57	L2

July: 8–16 (Home: 4–8; Away: 4–8)

#	Date	Opponent	Score	Win	Loss	Save	Attendance	Record	Streak
83	July 1	@ Mariners	0–1	Paxton (8–2)	**Keller** (2–3)	Díaz (32)	38,344	25–58	L3
84	July 2	Indians	3–9	Kluber (12–4)	**Junis** (5–10)	—	18,285	25–59	L4
85	July 3	Indians	4–6	Bieber (4–0)	**Duffy** (4–8)	Allen (17)	19,005	25–60	L5
86	July 4	Indians	2–3	Bauer (8–6)	**Oaks** (0–2)	Allen (18)	22,001	25–61	L6
87	July 6	Red Sox	5–10	Sale (9–4)	**Hammel** (2–11)	—	24,673	25–62	L7
88	July 7	Red Sox	4–15	Hembree (4–1)	**Adam** (0–2)	—	30,347	25–63	L8
89	July 8	Red Sox	4–7	Porcello (11–3)	**Fillmyer** (0–1)	Kimbrel (27)	28,443	25–64	L9
90	July 9	@ Twins	1–3	Berríos (9–7)	**Hill** (1–3)	Rodney (20)	20,199	25–65	L10
91	July 10	@ Twins	9–4	**Flynn** (1–1)	Slegers (1–1)	—	27,551	26–65	W1
92	July 11	@ Twins	5–8	Lynn (7–7)	**Sparkman** (0–1)	—	26,708	26–66	L1
93	July 13	@ White Sox	6–9	Shields (4–10)	**Keller** (2–4)	Soria (14)	19,361	26–67	L2
94	July 14	@ White Sox	5–0	**Duffy** (5–8)	López (4–7)	—	20,159	27–67	W1
95	July 15	@ White Sox	1–10	Giolito (6–8)	**Smith** (0–1)	—	23,434	27–68	L1
**89th All-Star Game in Washington, D.C.**
96	July 20	Twins	6–5	**Duffy** (6–8)	Gibson (4–7)	**Maurer** (1)	27,719	28–68	W1
97	July 21	Twins	4–2	**Flynn** (2–1)	Lynn (7–8)	**Peralta** (3)	22,159	29–68	W2
98	July 22	Twins	5–3	**Keller** (3–4)	Duke (3–4)	**Peralta** (4)	18,107	30–68	W3
99	July 23	Tigers	4–5	Wilson (1–3)	**Maurer** (0–4)	Greene (20)	18,370	30–69	L1
100	July 24	Tigers	5–4	**Smith** (1–1)	Zimmermann (4–2)	**Peralta** (5)	25,957	31–69	W1
101	July 25	Tigers	4–8	Boyd (5–9)	**Duffy** (6–9)	—	17,382	31–70	L1
102	July 26	@ Yankees	2–7	Gray (8–7)	**Junis** (5–11)	—	46,965	31–71	L2
—	July 27	@ Yankees	**Postponed (weather)** (Rescheduled for July 28)						
103	July 28	@ Yankees	10–5	**Keller** (4–4)	Severino (14–4)	—	46,571	32–71	W1
104	July 28	@ Yankees	4–5	Betances (2–3)	**Flynn** (2–2)	Chapman (27)	45,043	32–72	L1
105	July 29	@ Yankees	3–6	Happ (11–6)	**Smith** (1–2)	Chapman (28)	46,192	32–73	L2
106	July 31	@ White Sox	4–2	**Duffy** (7–9)	Shields (4–13)	**Peralta** (6)	15,250	33–73	W1

August: 10–18 (Home: 8–8; Away: 2–10)

#	Date	Opponent	Score	Win	Loss	Save	Attendance	Record	Streak
107	August 1	@ White Sox	10–5	**Junis** (6–11)	Covey (4–7)	—	18,019	34–73	W2
108	August 2	@ White Sox	4–6	Cedeño (1–0)	**Adam** (0–3)	Avilán (1)	19,682	34–74	L1
109	August 3	@ Twins	4–6	Moya (1–0)	**Flynn** (2–3)	Rodney (23)	22,236	34–75	L2
110	August 4	@ Twins	2–8	Berríos (11–8)	**Smith** (1–3)	—	27,909	34–76	L3
111	August 5	@ Twins	5–6	Moya (2–0)	**Duffy** (7–10)	Rodney (24)	25,390	34–77	L4
112	August 6	Cubs	1–3	Hamels (2–0)	**McCarthy** (4–4)	Strop (8)	32,339	34–78	L5
113	August 7	Cubs	0–5	Montgomery (4–4)	**Keller** (4–5)	—	27,883	34–79	L6
114	August 8	Cubs	9–0	**Fillmyer** (1–1)	Quintana (10–8)	—	24,294	35–79	W1
115	August 10	Cardinals	0–7	Gomber (2–0)	**Smith** (1–4)	Poncedeleon (1)	29,414	35–80	L1
116	August 11	Cardinals	3–8	Flaherty (6–6)	**Duffy** (7–11)	Hicks (3)	38,427	35–81	L2
117	August 12	Cardinals	2–8	Ross (7–9)	**Hammel** (2–12)	—	23.409	35–82	L3
118	August 13	Blue Jays	3–1	**Keller** (5–5)	Reid-Foley (0–1)	**Peralta** (7)	14,721	36–82	W1
119	August 14	Blue Jays	5–6	Petricka (2–1)	**Boyer** (2–1)	Giles (14)	13,680	36–83	L1
120	August 15	Blue Jays	5–6	Estrada (6–9)	**López** (0–1)	Giles (15)	14,391	36–84	L2
121	August 16	Blue Jays	6–2	**Flynn** (3–3)	Gaviglio (2–6)	—	14,894	37–84	W1
122	August 17	@ White Sox	3–9	Shields (5–14)	**Hill** (1–4)	—	24,556	37–85	L1
123	August 18	@ White Sox	3–1	**Keller** (6–5)	Covey (4–10)	**Peralta** (8)	19,018	38–85	W1
124	August 19	@ White Sox	6–7	Santiago (5–3)	**Flynn** (3–4)	Fry (2)	22,033	38–86	L1
125	August 20	@ Rays	0–1	Yarbrough (12–5)	**López** (0–2)	Alvarado (5)	10,036	38–87	L2
126	August 21	@ Rays	1–4	Snell (15–5)	**Sparkman** (0–2)	Romo (17)	9,402	38–88	L3
127	August 22	@ Rays	3–6	Chirinos (2–5)	**Junis** (6–12)	Romo (18)	8,638	38–89	L4
128	August 23	@ Rays	3–4	Romo (3–3)	**Flynn** (3–5)	—	9,088	38–90	L5
129	August 24	Indians	5–4	**Peralta** (1–0)	Allen (4–5)	—	19,304	39–90	W1
130	August 25	Indians	7–1	**Fillmyer** (2–1)	Kluber (16–7)	—	16,894	40–90	W2
131	August 26	Indians	5–12	Bieber (8–2)	**López** (0–3)	—	18,575	40–91	L1
132	August 28	Tigers	6–2	**Junis** (7–12)	Boyd (8–12)	—	16,888	41–91	W1
133	August 29	Tigers	9–2	**Duffy** (8–11)	Fulmer (3–10)	—	17,091	42–91	W2
134	August 31	Orioles	9–2	**Keller** (7–5)	Cashner (4–13)	—	15,394	43–91	W3

September: 15–13 (Home: 9–4; Away: 6–9)

#	Date	Opponent	Score	Win	Loss	Save	Attendance	Record	Streak
135	September 1	Orioles	5–4	**Newberry** (1–0)	Givens (0–7)	—	15,358	44–91	W4
136	September 2	Orioles	9–1	**López** (1–3)	Hess (3–9)	—	18,463	45–91	W5
137	September 3	@ Indians	5–1	**Junis** (8–12)	Plutko (4–5)	**Hill** (2)	20,536	46–91	W6
138	September 4	@ Indians	3–9	Clevinger (11–7)	**Duffy** (8–12)	—	17,041	46–92	L1
139	September 5	@ Indians	1–3	Kluber (18–7)	**Keller** (7–6)	Hand (8)	18,435	46–93	L2
140	September 7	@ Twins	6–10	May (4–1)	**Sparkman** (0–3)	—	19,944	46–94	L3
141	September 8	@ Twins	4–1	**López** (2–3)	Berríos (11–11)	**Peralta** (9)	25,814	47–94	W1
142	September 9	@ Twins	1–3	Hildenberger (4–3)	**Hammel** (2–13)	—	20,903	47–95	L1
143	September 10	White Sox	4–3 (10)	**Newberry** (2–0)	Gómez (0–2)	—	17,809	48–95	W1
144	September 11	White Sox	6–3	**Keller** (8–6)	Covey (5–13)	**Peralta** (10)	17,613	49–95	W2
145	September 12	White Sox	2–4 (12)	Minaya (2–2)	**Smith** (1–5)	Santiago (2)	17,840	49–96	L1
146	September 13	Twins	6–4	**Fillmyer** (3–1)	Busenitz (4–1)	**Peralta** (11)	18,745	50–96	W1
147	September 14	Twins	8–4	**Hammel** (3–13)	Hildenberger (4–4)	—	18,389	51–96	W2
148	September 15	Twins	10–3	**Kennedy** (2–8)	De Jong (0–1)	—	19,505	52–96	W3
149	September 16	Twins	6–9	Gibson (8–13)	**Vasto** (0–1)	—	20,286	52–97	L1
150	September 17	@ Pirates	6–7	Santana (3–3)	**Lively** (0–1)	—	10,316	52–98	L2
151	September 18	@ Pirates	1–2 (11)	Crick (3–2)	**Smith** (1–5)	—	11,566	52–99	L3
152	September 19	@ Pirates	1–2	Archer (5–8)	**Fillmyer** (3–2)	Vázquez (35)	13,073	52–100	L4
153	September 20	@ Tigers	8–11	Reininger (1–0)	**López** (2–4)	—	20,282	52–101	L5
154	September 21	@ Tigers	4–3	**Kennedy** (3–8)	Liriano (5–11)	**Peralta** (12)	22,001	53–101	W1
155	September 22	@ Tigers	4–5	Jiménez (5–4)	**Hammel** (3–14)	Greene (31)	24,815	53–102	L1
156	September 23	@ Tigers	3–2	**Keller** (9–6)	VerHagen (3–3)	**Peralta** (13)	24,230	54–102	W1
157	September 25	@ Reds	4–3	**McCarthy** (5–4)	Iglesias (2–5)	**Peralta** (14)	13,172	55–102	W2
158	September 26	@ Reds	6-1	**Fillmyer** (4–2)	Reed (1–3)	—	12,549	56–102	W3
159	September 27	Indians	2–1 (10)	**Hammel** (4–14)	Ramírez (0–3)	—	19,262	57–102	W4
160	September 28	Indians	6–14	Clevinger (13–8)	**Kennedy** (3–9)	—	15,920	57–103	L1
161	September 29	Indians	9–4	**Junis** (9–12)	Miller (2–4)	—	23,324	58–103	W1
162	September 30	Indians	1–2	Carrasco (17–10)	**Skoglund** (1–6)	Bauer (1)	19,690	58–104	L1

Legend: = Win = Loss = Postponement
Bold = Royals team member

== Season standings ==
=== American League Central ===
AL Central
Team	W	L	Pct.	GB	Home	Road
Cleveland Indians	91	71	.562	—	49‍–‍32	42‍–‍39
Minnesota Twins	78	84	.481	13	49‍–‍32	29‍–‍52
Detroit Tigers	64	98	.395	27	38‍–‍43	26‍–‍55
Chicago White Sox	62	100	.383	29	30‍–‍51	32‍–‍49
Kansas City Royals	58	104	.358	33	32‍–‍49	26‍–‍55

=== American League Wild Card ===
Division leaders
Team	W	L	Pct.
Boston Red Sox	108	54	.667
Houston Astros	103	59	.636
Cleveland Indians	91	71	.562

Wild Card teams (Top 2 teams qualify for postseason)
Team	W	L	Pct.	GB
New York Yankees	100	62	.617	+3
Oakland Athletics	97	65	.599	—
Tampa Bay Rays	90	72	.556	7
Seattle Mariners	89	73	.549	8
Los Angeles Angels	80	82	.494	17
Minnesota Twins	78	84	.481	19
Toronto Blue Jays	73	89	.451	24
Texas Rangers	67	95	.414	30
Detroit Tigers	64	98	.395	33
Chicago White Sox	62	100	.383	35
Kansas City Royals	58	104	.358	39
Baltimore Orioles	47	115	.290	50

=== Record against opponents ===
2018 American League record Source: MLB Standings Grid – 2018
Team	BAL	BOS	CWS	CLE	DET	HOU	KC	LAA	MIN	NYY	OAK	SEA	TB	TEX	TOR	NL
Baltimore	—	3–16	3–4	2–5	2–4	1–6	2–4	1–5	1–6	7–12	1–5	1–6	8–11	3–4	5–14	7–13
Boston	16–3	—	3–4	3–4	4–2	3–4	5–1	6–0	4–3	10–9	2–4	4–3	11–8	6–1	15–4	16–4
Chicago	4–3	4–3	—	5–14	7–12	0–7	11–8	2–5	7–12	2–4	2–5	2–4	4–2	4–3	2–4	6–14
Cleveland	5–2	4–3	14–5	—	13–6	3–4	12–7	3–3	10–9	2–5	2–4	2–5	2–4	4–2	3–4	12–8
Detroit	4–2	2–4	12–7	6–13	—	1–5	8–11	3–4	7–12	3–4	0–7	3–4	2–4	3–4	4–3	6–14
Houston	6–1	4–3	7–0	4–3	5–1	—	5–1	13–6	4–2	2–5	12–7	9–10	3–4	12–7	4–2	13–7
Kansas City	4–2	1–5	8–11	7–12	11–8	1–5	—	1–6	10–9	2–5	2–5	1–5	0–7	2–5	2–5	6–14
Los Angeles	5–1	0–6	5–2	3–3	4–3	6–13	6–1	—	4–3	1–5	10–9	8–11	1–6	13–6	4–3	10–10
Minnesota	6–1	3–4	12–7	9–10	12–7	2–4	9–10	3–4	—	2–5	2–5	1–5	3–4	2–4	4–2	8–12
New York	12–7	9–10	4–2	5–2	4–3	5–2	5–2	5–1	5–2	—	3–3	5–1	10–9	4–3	13–6	11–9
Oakland	5–1	4–2	5–2	4–2	7–0	7–12	5–2	9–10	5–2	3–3	—	9–10	2–5	13–6	7–0	12–8
Seattle	6–1	3–4	4–2	5–2	4–3	10–9	5–1	11–8	5–1	1–5	10–9	—	6–1	10–9	3–4	6–14
Tampa Bay	11–8	8–11	2–4	4–2	4–2	4–3	7–0	6–1	4–3	9–10	5–2	1–6	—	5–1	13–6	7–13
Texas	4–3	1–6	3–4	2–4	4–3	7–12	5–2	6–13	4–2	3–4	6–13	9–10	1–5	—	3–3	9–11
Toronto	14–5	4–15	4–2	4–3	3–4	2–4	5–2	3–4	2–4	6–13	0–7	4–3	6–13	3–3	—	13–7

== Roster ==
2018 Kansas City Royals
Roster
Pitchers: 50 Jason Adam; 58 Scott Barlow; 51 Blaine Boyer; 41 Danny Duffy; 49 Heath Fillmyer; 33 Brian Flynn; 52 Justin Grimm; 39 Jason Hammel; 40 Kelvin Herrera; 54 Tim Hill; 65 Jake Junis; 56 Brad Keller; 31 Ian Kennedy; 48 Ben Lively; 52 Jorge López; 37 Brandon Maurer; 61 Kevin McCarthy; 68 Jake Newberry; 34 Trevor Oaks; 43 Wily Peralta; 72 Enny Romero; 53 Eric Skoglund; 64 Burch Smith; 57 Glenn Sparkman; 62 Eric Stout; 51 Jerry Vasto	Catchers: 9 Drew Butera; 36 Cam Gallagher; 13 Salvador Perez; 72 Meibrys Viloria; Infielders: 19 Cheslor Cuthbert; 17 Hunter Dozier; 21 Lucas Duda; 2 Alcides Escobar; 1 Ryan Goins; 15 Whit Merrifield; 27 Adalberto Mondesí; 8 Mike Moustakas; 66 Ryan O'Hearn; 46 Ramón Torres	Outfielders: 45 Abraham Almonte; 38 Jorge Bonifacio; 25 Brian Goodwin; 4 Alex Gordon; 7 Rosell Herrera; 25 Jon Jay; 16 Paulo Orlando; 14 Brett Phillips; 12 Jorge Soler	Manager: 3 Ned Yost; Coaches: 44 Terry Bradshaw (hitting); 80 Ryan Eigsti (bullpen catcher); 22 Cal Eldred (pitching); 28 Pedro Grifol (quality control / catching); 23 Mike Jirschele (third base); 24 Mitch Maier (first base); 26 Dale Sveum (bench); 18 Vance Wilson (bullpen)

== Player stats ==
=== Batting ===
Note: G = Games played; AB = At bats; R = Runs; H = Hits; 2B = Doubles; 3B = Triples; HR = Home runs; RBI = Runs batted in; SB = Stolen bases; BB = Walks; AVG = Batting average; SLG = Slugging average

Player	G	AB	R	H	2B	3B	HR	RBI	SB	BB	AVG	SLG
Whit Merrifield	158	632	88	192	43	3	12	60	45	61	.304	.438
Salvador Pérez	129	510	52	120	23	0	27	80	1	17	.235	.439
Alex Gordon	141	506	56	124	24	0	13	54	12	50	.245	.370
Alcides Escobar	140	485	54	112	22	3	4	34	8	29	.231	.313
Mike Moustakas	98	378	46	94	21	1	20	62	3	30	.249	.468
Hunter Dozier	102	362	36	83	19	4	11	34	2	24	.229	.395
Lucas Duda	87	310	34	75	12	1	13	48	1	24	.242	.413
Adalberto Mondesí	75	275	47	76	13	3	14	37	32	11	.276	.498
Rosell Herrera	75	265	25	63	14	3	1	20	3	19	.238	.325
Jon Jay	59	238	28	73	9	2	1	18	3	19	.307	.374
Jorge Bonifacio	69	236	31	53	16	2	4	23	0	29	.225	.360
Jorge Soler	61	223	27	59	18	0	9	28	3	28	.265	.466
Drew Butera	51	149	11	28	9	0	2	18	0	13	.188	.289
Ryan O'Hearn	44	149	23	39	10	2	12	30	0	20	.262	.597
Abraham Almonte	50	134	15	24	1	2	3	9	2	15	.179	.284
Ryan Goins	41	115	10	26	8	1	0	6	0	4	.226	.313
Brett Phillips	36	112	13	21	4	2	2	7	1	9	.188	.313
Cheslor Cuthbert	30	103	11	20	2	0	3	7	0	11	.194	.301
Brian Goodwin	27	94	11	25	5	0	3	13	1	6	.266	.415
Paulo Orlando	25	90	6	15	3	0	0	5	0	3	.167	.200
Cam Gallagher	22	63	5	13	3	0	1	7	0	3	.206	.302
Ramón Torres	9	28	4	5	1	0	0	1	0	1	.179	.214
Meibrys Viloria	10	27	4	7	2	0	0	4	0	1	.259	.333
Pitcher totals	162	21	1	3	1	0	0	1	0	0	.143	.190
Team totals	162	5505	638	1350	283	29	155	606	117	427	.245	.392

=== Pitching ===
Note: W = Wins; L = Losses; ERA = Earned run average; G = Games pitched; GS = Games started; SV = Saves; IP = Innings pitched; H = Hits allowed; R = Runs allowed; ER = Earned runs allowed; BB = Walks allowed; SO = Strikeouts

Player	W	L	ERA	G	GS	SV	IP	H	R	ER	BB	SO
Jakob Junis	9	12	4.37	30	30	0	177.0	182	94	86	43	164
Danny Duffy	8	12	4.88	28	28	0	155.0	161	86	84	70	141
Brad Keller	9	6	3.08	41	20	0	140.1	133	50	48	50	96
Jason Hammel	4	14	6.02	39	18	0	127.0	168	91	85	39	92
Ian Kennedy	3	9	4.66	22	22	0	119.2	125	66	62	40	105
Heath Fillmyer	4	2	4.26	17	13	0	82.1	78	41	39	32	57
Burch Smith	1	6	6.92	38	6	0	78.0	90	60	60	40	77
Brian Flynn	3	5	4.04	48	0	1	75.2	87	37	34	35	47
Kevin McCarthy	5	4	3.25	65	0	0	72.0	70	28	26	20	46
Eric Skoglund	1	6	5.14	14	13	0	70.0	66	41	40	19	49
Tim Hill	1	4	4.53	70	0	2	45.2	46	28	23	14	42
Glenn Sparkman	0	3	4.46	15	3	0	38.1	47	20	19	15	27
Wily Peralta	1	0	3.67	37	0	14	34.1	28	14	14	23	35
Jorge López	2	4	6.35	7	7	0	34.0	41	24	24	9	23
Jason Adam	0	3	6.12	31	0	0	32.1	30	22	22	15	37
Brandon Maurer	0	4	7.76	37	0	1	31.1	42	29	27	25	31
Kelvin Herrera	1	1	1.05	27	0	14	25.2	19	3	3	2	22
Blaine Boyer	2	1	12.05	21	0	1	21.2	32	33	29	13	9
Scott Barlow	1	1	3.60	6	0	0	15.0	16	7	6	3	15
Trevor Oaks	0	2	7.24	4	2	0	13.2	21	11	11	6	10
Jake Newberry	2	0	4.73	14	0	0	13.1	13	8	7	9	11
Justin Grimm	1	3	13.50	16	0	0	12.2	17	19	19	14	8
Ben Lively	0	1	1.35	5	0	0	6.2	7	1	1	5	5
Enny Romero	0	0	20.25	4	0	0	4.0	11	9	9	2	3
Jerry Vasto	0	1	2.45	5	0	0	3.2	3	2	1	1	3
Eric Stout	0	0	23.14	3	0	0	2.1	7	7	6	2	2
Drew Butera	0	0	54.00	1	0	0	0.1	2	2	2	3	0
Team totals	58	104	4.94	162	162	33	1432.0	1542	833	786	549	1157

== Farm system ==
Level	Team	League	Manager
AAA	Omaha Storm Chasers	Pacific Coast League	Brian Poldberg
AA	Northwest Arkansas Naturals	Texas League	Mike Rojas
A-Advanced	Wilmington Blue Rocks	Carolina League	Darryl Kennedy
A	Lexington Legends	South Atlantic League	Scott Thorman
Rookie	Burlington Royals	Appalachian League	Brooks Conrad
Rookie	Idaho Falls Chukars	Pioneer League	Omar Ramírez
Rookie	AZL Royals	Arizona League	Tony Peña Jr.
Rookie	DSL Royals	Dominican Summer League	
