= 2018 Cleveland Indians season =

2018 Cleveland Indians
- American League Central champions
- League: American League
- Division: Central
- Ballpark: Progressive Field
- City: Cleveland, Ohio
- Record: 91–71 (.562)
- Divisional place: 1st
- Owners: Larry Dolan
- President of baseball operations: Chris Antonetti
- General managers: Mike Chernoff
- Managers: Terry Francona
- Television: SportsTime Ohio · WKYC (Matt Underwood, Rick Manning)
- Radio: WTAM · WMMS; Cleveland Indians Radio Network (Tom Hamilton, Jim Rosenhaus, Rick Manning)

The 2018 Cleveland Indians season was the 118th season for the franchise. It was the sixth season under the leadership of manager Terry Francona and third under general manager Mike Chernoff. The Indians played all of their home games at Progressive Field in Cleveland, Ohio. This was the last season in which the Indians logo Chief Wahoo was used on uniforms or on stadium signs. They won their third straight American League Central title before being swept by the defending World Series champion Houston Astros in the ALDS. Due to the Indians losing to the Astros, the Indians became the fifth team in MLB history to have a 70-year title drought.

== Season standings ==
=== American League Central ===
AL Central
Team	W	L	Pct.	GB	Home	Road
Cleveland Indians	91	71	.562	—	49‍–‍32	42‍–‍39
Minnesota Twins	78	84	.481	13	49‍–‍32	29‍–‍52
Detroit Tigers	64	98	.395	27	38‍–‍43	26‍–‍55
Chicago White Sox	62	100	.383	29	30‍–‍51	32‍–‍49
Kansas City Royals	58	104	.358	33	32‍–‍49	26‍–‍55

=== American League Wild Card ===
Division leaders
Team	W	L	Pct.
Boston Red Sox	108	54	.667
Houston Astros	103	59	.636
Cleveland Indians	91	71	.562

Wild Card teams (Top 2 teams qualify for postseason)
Team	W	L	Pct.	GB
New York Yankees	100	62	.617	+3
Oakland Athletics	97	65	.599	—
Tampa Bay Rays	90	72	.556	7
Seattle Mariners	89	73	.549	8
Los Angeles Angels	80	82	.494	17
Minnesota Twins	78	84	.481	19
Toronto Blue Jays	73	89	.451	24
Texas Rangers	67	95	.414	30
Detroit Tigers	64	98	.395	33
Chicago White Sox	62	100	.383	35
Kansas City Royals	58	104	.358	39
Baltimore Orioles	47	115	.290	50

=== Record against opponents ===
2018 American League record Source: MLB Standings Grid – 2018
Team	BAL	BOS	CWS	CLE	DET	HOU	KC	LAA	MIN	NYY	OAK	SEA	TB	TEX	TOR	NL
Baltimore	—	3–16	3–4	2–5	2–4	1–6	2–4	1–5	1–6	7–12	1–5	1–6	8–11	3–4	5–14	7–13
Boston	16–3	—	3–4	3–4	4–2	3–4	5–1	6–0	4–3	10–9	2–4	4–3	11–8	6–1	15–4	16–4
Chicago	4–3	4–3	—	5–14	7–12	0–7	11–8	2–5	7–12	2–4	2–5	2–4	4–2	4–3	2–4	6–14
Cleveland	5–2	4–3	14–5	—	13–6	3–4	12–7	3–3	10–9	2–5	2–4	2–5	2–4	4–2	3–4	12–8
Detroit	4–2	2–4	12–7	6–13	—	1–5	8–11	3–4	7–12	3–4	0–7	3–4	2–4	3–4	4–3	6–14
Houston	6–1	4–3	7–0	4–3	5–1	—	5–1	13–6	4–2	2–5	12–7	9–10	3–4	12–7	4–2	13–7
Kansas City	4–2	1–5	8–11	7–12	11–8	1–5	—	1–6	10–9	2–5	2–5	1–5	0–7	2–5	2–5	6–14
Los Angeles	5–1	0–6	5–2	3–3	4–3	6–13	6–1	—	4–3	1–5	10–9	8–11	1–6	13–6	4–3	10–10
Minnesota	6–1	3–4	12–7	9–10	12–7	2–4	9–10	3–4	—	2–5	2–5	1–5	3–4	2–4	4–2	8–12
New York	12–7	9–10	4–2	5–2	4–3	5–2	5–2	5–1	5–2	—	3–3	5–1	10–9	4–3	13–6	11–9
Oakland	5–1	4–2	5–2	4–2	7–0	7–12	5–2	9–10	5–2	3–3	—	9–10	2–5	13–6	7–0	12–8
Seattle	6–1	3–4	4–2	5–2	4–3	10–9	5–1	11–8	5–1	1–5	10–9	—	6–1	10–9	3–4	6–14
Tampa Bay	11–8	8–11	2–4	4–2	4–2	4–3	7–0	6–1	4–3	9–10	5–2	1–6	—	5–1	13–6	7–13
Texas	4–3	1–6	3–4	2–4	4–3	7–12	5–2	6–13	4–2	3–4	6–13	9–10	1–5	—	3–3	9–11
Toronto	14–5	4–15	4–2	4–3	3–4	2–4	5–2	3–4	2–4	6–13	0–7	4–3	6–13	3–3	—	13–7

== Roster ==
2018 Cleveland Indians
Roster
Pitchers: 37 Cody Allen; 47 Trevor Bauer; 46 Matt Belisle; 38 Jeff Beliveau; 57 Shane Bieber; 59 Carlos Carrasco; 90 Adam Cimber; 52 Mike Clevinger; 46 Oliver Drake; 46 Jon Edwards; 44 Nick Goody; 33 Brad Hand; 28 Corey Kluber; 70 George Kontos; 50 Evan Marshall; 34,50 Zach McAllister; 24 Andrew Miller; 40 Alexi Ogando; 49 Tyler Olson; 61 Dan Otero; 39 Óliver Pérez; 45 Adam Plutko; 58 Neil Ramírez; 33 Marc Rzepczynski; 35 Ben Taylor; 43 Josh Tomlin	Catchers: 7 Yan Gomes; 38 Eric Haase; 55 Roberto Pérez; Infielders: 17 Yonder Alonso; 36 Yandy Díaz; 27 Josh Donaldson; 10 Edwin Encarnación; 9 Erik González; 22 Jason Kipnis; 12 Francisco Lindor; 11 José Ramírez; 32 Adam Rosales	Outfielders: 53,1 Greg Allen; 0 Brandon Barnes; 23 Michael Brantley; 53 Melky Cabrera; 8 Lonnie Chisenhall; 28,26 Rajai Davis; 6 Brandon Guyer; 13 Leonys Martín; 30 Tyler Naquin; 4 Bradley Zimmer; Other batters: 27 Francisco Mejía	Manager: 77 Terry Francona; Coaches: 15 Sandy Alomar Jr. (first base/catchers); 48 Scott Atchison (bullpen); 87 Mike Barnett (replay coordinator); 86 Mark Budzinski (coach); 64 Armando Camacaro (bullpen catcher); 2 Brad Mills (bench/outfield); 82 Ricky Pacione (bullpen catcher); 60 Victor Rodriguez (assistant hitting); 16 Mike Sarbaugh (third base/infield); 85 Brian Sweeney (coach); 29 Ty Van Burkleo (hitting); 51 Carl Willis (pitching)

== Game log ==
2018 Game Log: 91–71 (Home: 49–32; Away: 42–39)
March/April: 15–12 (Home: 9–6; Away: 6–6)

#	Date	Opponent	Score	Win	Loss	Save	Attendance	Record	Streak
1	March 29	@ Mariners	1–2	Hernández (1–0)	**Kluber** (0–1)	Díaz (1)	47,149	0–1	L1
2	March 31	@ Mariners	6–5	**Carrasco** (1–0)	Paxton (0–1)	**Allen** (1)	35,881	1–1	W1
3	April 1	@ Mariners	4–5	Leake (1–0)	**Otero** (0–1)	Díaz (2)	24,506	1–2	L1
4	April 2	@ Angels	6–0	**Clevinger** (1–0)	Ramírez (0–1)	—	43,904	2–2	W1
5	April 3	@ Angels	2–13	Richards (1–0)	**Tomlin** (0–1)	—	35,007	2–3	L1
6	April 4	@ Angels	2–3 (13)	Ramirez (1–1)	**McAllister** (0–1)	—	32,412	2–4	L2
7	April 6	Royals	3–2	**Carrasco** (2–0)	Duffy (0–2)	**Allen** (2)	34,720	3–4	W1
8	April 7	Royals	0–1	Kennedy (1–0)	**Bauer** (0–1)	Herrera (2)	17,362	3–5	L1
9	April 8	Royals	3–1	**Allen** (1–0)	Maurer (0–2)	—	14,240	4–5	W1
10	April 9	Tigers	2–0	**Kluber** (1–1)	Liriano (1–1)	**Miller** (1)	9,843	5–5	W2
11	April 10	Tigers	2–1	**Miller** (1–0)	Wilson (0–2)	**Allen** (3)	10,078	6–5	W3
12	April 11	Tigers	5–1	**Carrasco** (3–0)	Norris (0–1)	—	10,872	7–5	W4
13	April 12	Tigers	9–3	**Bauer** (1–1)	Fulmer (1–2)	—	12,901	8–5	W5
14	April 13	Blue Jays	4–8	Barnes (1–0)	**McAllister** (0–2)	—	25,592	8–6	L1
—	April 14	Blue Jays	Postponed (rain). Makeup date: May 3 (Game 1).						
—	April 15	Blue Jays	Postponed (rain). Makeup date: May 3 (Game 2).						
15	April 17	@ Twins *	6–1	**Kluber** (2–1)	Odorizzi (1–1)	—	19,516	9–6	W1
16	April 18	@ Twins *	1–2 (16)	Busenitz (1–0)	**Tomlin** (0–2)	—	19,537	9–7	L1
17	April 20	@ Orioles	1–3	Bundy (1–2)	**Bauer** (1–2)	O'Day (1)	20,004	9–8	L2
18	April 21	@ Orioles	4–0	**Clevinger** (2–0)	Tillman (0–4)	—	29,187	10–8	W1
19	April 22	@ Orioles	7–3	**Kluber** (3–1)	Cashner (1–3)	—	27,394	11–8	W2
20	April 23	@ Orioles	2–1	**Carrasco** (4–0)	Gausman (1–2)	**Allen** (4)	10,614	12–8	W3
21	April 24	Cubs	3–10	Chatwood (1–3)	**Tomlin** (0–3)	—	16,408	12–9	L1
22	April 25	Cubs	4–1	**Bauer** (2–2)	Lester (2–1)	**Allen** (5)	15,712	13–9	W1
23	April 26	Mariners	4–5	Altavilla (2–2)	**Goody** (0–1)	Díaz (11)	12,133	13–10	L1
24	April 27	Mariners	6–5	**Kluber** (4–1)	Ramírez (0–2)	—	16,335	14–10	W1
25	April 28	Mariners	4–12	Leake (3–2)	**Carrasco** (4–1)	—	19,172	14–11	L1
26	April 29	Mariners	4–10	Gonzales (3–2)	**Tomlin** (0–4)	—	17,878	14–12	L2
27	April 30	Rangers	7–5	**Allen** (2–0)	Martin (0–1)	**Beliveau** (1)	12,851	15–12	W1
*April 17 and 18 games played in San Juan, Puerto Rico

May: 15–13 (Home: 9–5; Away: 6–8)

#	Date	Opponent	Score	Win	Loss	Save	Attendance	Record	Streak
28	May 1	Rangers	6–8 (12)	**Claudio** (1–1)	Goody (0–2)	—	16,356	15–13	L1
29	May 2	Rangers	12–4	**Kluber** (5–1)	Moore (1–4)	—	15,637	16–13	W1
30	May 3	Blue Jays	11–13 (11)	Mayza (1–0)	**Olson** (0–1)	—	19,007	16–14	L1
31	May 3	Blue Jays	13–4	**Plutko** (1–0)	Biagini (0–1)	—	19,007	17–14	W1
32	May 4	@ Yankees	6–7	Chapman (1–0)	**Ogando** (0–1)	—	46,869	17–15	L1
33	May 5	@ Yankees	2–5	Gray (2–2)	**Bauer** (2–3)	Robertson (1)	43,075	17–16	L2
34	May 6	@ Yankees	4–7	Shreve (2–0)	**Allen** (2–1)	—	40,107	17–17	L3
35	May 8	@ Brewers	2–3	Suter (2–2)	**Kluber** (5–2)	Hader (5)	35,314	17–18	L4
36	May 9	@ Brewers	6–2	**Carrasco** (5–1)	Guerra (2–3)	—	26,345	18–18	W1
37	May 11	Royals	9–10	Keller (1–1)	**Miller** (1–1)	Herrera (8)	24,408	18–19	L1
38	May 12	Royals	6–2	**Clevinger** (3–0)	Junis (4–3)	—	24,587	19–19	W1
39	May 13	Royals	11–2	**Kluber** (6–2)	Duffy (1–5)	—	22,105	20–19	W2
40	May 14	@ Tigers	3–6	Fiers (4–2)	**Carrasco** (5–2)	—	17,775	20–20	L1
41	May 15	@ Tigers	8–9	Coleman (1–0)	**Miller** (1–2)	Greene (9)	20,997	20–21	L2
42	May 16	@ Tigers	6–0	**Bauer** (3–3)	Carpenter (0–1)	—	24,771	21–21	W1
43	May 18	@ Astros	1–4	Morton (6–0)	**Clevinger** (3–1)	Giles (7)	35,959	21–22	L1
44	May 19	@ Astros	5–4	**Kluber** (7–2)	Keuchel (3–6)	**Allen** (6)	39,926	22–22	W1
45	May 20	@ Astros	1–3	McCullers Jr. (6–2)	**Carrasco** (5–3)	Giles (8)	30,770	22–23	L1
46	May 22	@ Cubs	10–1	**Bauer** (4–3)	Chatwood (3–4)	—	37,168	23–23	W1
47	May 23	@ Cubs	1–0	**Plutko** (2–0)	Lester (4–2)	**Allen** (7)	39,004	24–23	W2
48	May 24	Astros	2–8	Morton (7–0)	**Clevinger** (3–2)	—	19,660	24–24	L1
49	May 25	Astros	2–11	Smith (2–1)	**Miller** (1–3)	—	29,431	24–25	L2
50	May 26	Astros	8–6	**Carrasco** (6–3)	McCullers Jr. (6–3)	**Allen** (8)	30,639	25–25	W1
51	May 27	Astros	10–9 (14)	**Otero** (1–1)	Peacock (1–2)	—	27,765	26–25	W2
52	May 28	White Sox	9–6	**Plutko** (3–0)	Volstad (0–3)	—	23,729	27–25	W3
53	May 29	White Sox	7–3	**Clevinger** (4–2)	Giolito (3–6)	—	30,441	28–25	W4
54	May 30	White Sox	9–1	**Kluber** (8–2)	López (1–4)	—	17,930	29–25	W5
55	May 31	@ Twins	9–8	**Olson** (1–1)	Reed (1–4)	**Allen** (9)	19,148	30–25	W6

June: 14–12 (Home: 9–2; Away: 5–10)

#	Date	Opponent	Score	Win	Loss	Save	Attendance	Record	Streak
56	June 1	@ Twins	4–7	Berríos (6–5)	**Carrasco** (6–4)	Rodney (12)	30,171	30-26	L1
57	June 2	@ Twins	1–7	Lynn (4–4)	**Bauer** (4–4)	—	23,476	30-27	L2
58	June 3	@ Twins	5–7	Rodney (2–2)	**Allen** (2–2)	—	26,096	30-28	L3
59	June 5	Brewers	3–2	**Kluber** (9–2)	Guerra (3–4)	**Allen** (10)	22,330	31-28	W1
60	June 6	Brewers	3–1	**Carrasco** (7–4)	Anderson (4–5)	**Allen** (11)	21,315	32-28	W2
61	June 8	@ Tigers	4–1	**Bauer** (5–4)	Greene (2–3)	**Allen** (12)	21,766	33-28	W3
62	June 9	@ Tigers	2–4 (12)	Saupold (4–1)	**Allen** (2–3)	—	27,038	33-29	L1
63	June 10	@ Tigers	9–2	**Kluber** (10–2)	Lewicki (0–2)	—	22,862	34-29	W1
64	June 11	@ White Sox	4–0	**Carrasco** (8–4)	Giolito (4–7)	—	13,125	35-29	W2
65	June 12	@ White Sox	1–5	Shields (2–7)	**Plutko** (3–1)	Soria (9)	12,357	35-30	L1
66	June 13	@ White Sox	2–3	Covey (3–1)	**Bauer** (5–5)	Soria (10)	19,390	35-31	L2
67	June 14	@ White Sox	5–2	**Clevinger** (5–2)	Volstad (1–4)	**Allen** (13)	17,183	36-31	W1
68	June 15	Twins	3–6	Gibson (2–4)	**Kluber** (10–3)	Rodney (13)	32,637	36-32	L1
69	June 16	Twins	3–9	Magill (2–1)	**Carrasco** (8–5)	—	30,282	36-33	L2
70	June 17	Twins	4–1	**Bieber** (1–0)	Odorizzi (3–4)	**Allen** (14)	27,128	37-33	W1
71	June 18	White Sox	6–2	**Bauer** (6–5)	Covey (3–2)	—	17,271	38-33	W2
72	June 19	White Sox	6–3	**Clevinger** (6–2)	Rodon (0–2)	**Allen** (15)	20,394	39-33	W3
73	June 20	White Sox	12–0	**Kluber** (11–3)	Lopez (2–5)	—	23,101	40-33	W4
74	June 22	Tigers	10–0	**Bieber** (2–0)	Fiers (5–4)	—	30,926	41-33	W5
75	June 23	Tigers	4–1	**Bauer** (7–5)	Liriano (3–3)	**Allen** (16)	34,435	42–33	W6
76	June 24	Tigers	12–2	**Plutko** (4–1)	Boyd (4–6)	—	31,208	43-33	W7
77	June 25	@ Cardinals	0–4	Gant (2–2)	**Clevinger** (6–3)	Norris (15)	42,007	43–34	L1
78	June 26	@ Cardinals	2–11	Martinez (4–4)	**Kluber** (11–4)	—	40,288	43–35	L2
79	June 27	@ Cardinals	5–1	**Bieber** (3–0)	Flaherty (3–3)	—	43,598	44–35	W1
80	June 29	@ Athletics	1–3	Blackburn (2–2)	**Bauer** (7–6)	Trienen (21)	14,823	44–36	L1
81	June 30	@ Athletics	2–7	Jackson (1–0)	**Plutko** (4–2)	Trivino (3)	17,748	44–37	L2

July: 14–11 (Home: 5–8; Away: 9–3)

#	Date	Opponent	Score	Win	Loss	Save	Attendance	Record	Streak
82	July 1	@ Athletics	15–3	**Clevinger** (7–3)	Montas (4–2)	—	16,164	45–37	W1
83	July 2	@ Royals	9–3	**Kluber** (12–4)	Junis (5–10)	—	18,285	46–37	W2
84	July 3	@ Royals	6–4	**Bieber** (4–0)	Duffy (4–8)	**Allen** (17)	19,005	47–37	W3
85	July 4	@ Royals	3–2	**Bauer** (8–6)	Oaks (0–2)	**Allen** (18)	22,001	48–37	W4
86	July 6	Athletics	10–4	**Carrasco** (9–5)	Blackburn (2–3)	—	34,633	49–37	W5
87	July 7	Athletics	3–6 (11)	Trienen (5–1)	**Tomlin** (0–5)	—	33,195	49–38	L1
88	July 8	Athletics	0–6	Anderson (1–2)	**Bieber** (4–1)	—	27,125	49–39	L2
89	July 9	Reds	5–7	DeSclafani (4–1)	**Clevinger** (7–4)	Iglesias (18)	22,561	49–40	L3
90	July 10	Reds	4–7	Crockett (1–0)	**Allen** (2–4)	Iglesias (19)	21,908	49–41	L4
91	July 11	Reds	19–4	**Carrasco** (10–5)	Mahle (7–7)	**Plutko** (1)	22,215	50–41	W1
92	July 12	Yankees	4–7	Robertson (6–3)	**Kluber** (12–5)	Chapman (25)	31,267	50–42	L1
93	July 13	Yankees	6–5	**Bieber** (5–1)	German (2–5)	**Allen** (19)	35,078	51–42	W1
94	July 14	Yankees	4–5	Robertson (7–3)	**Clevinger** (7–5)	Chapman (26)	35,353	51–43	L1
95	July 15	Yankees	5–2	**Carrasco** (11–5)	Green (5–2)	**Allen** (20)	32,664	52–43	W1
**89th All-Star Game**
96	July 20	@ Rangers	9–8 (11)	**McAllister** (1–2)	Moore (1–6)	**Otero** (1)	28,253	53–43	W2
97	July 21	@ Rangers	16–3	**Carrasco** (12–5)	Colón (5–8)	—	31,532	54-43	W3
98	July 22	@ Rangers	0–5	Gallardo (4–1)	**Clevinger** (7–6)	—	21,829	54–44	L1
99	July 23	Pirates	0–7 (6)	Williams (8–7)	**Kluber** (12–6)	—	24,925	54–45	L2
100	July 24	Pirates	4–9	Musgrove (4–4)	**Bieber** (5–2)	—	26,414	54–46	L3
101	July 25	Pirates	4–0	**Bauer** (9–6)	Taillon (7–8)	**Hand** (25)	31,682	55–46	W1
102	July 27	@ Tigers	8–3	**Allen** (3–4)	Jimenez (4–2)	—	26,962	56–46	W2
103	July 28	@ Tigers	1–2	Hardy (4–3)	**Clevinger** (7–7)	Greene (21)	29,097	56–47	L1
104	July 29	@ Tigers	8–1	**Kluber** (13–6)	Zimmermann (4–3)	—	26,498	57–47	W1
105	July 30	@ Twins	4–5	Rodney (3–2)	**Ramirez** (0–1)	—	26,256	57–48	L1
106	July 31	@ Twins	6–2	**Bauer** (10–6)	Gibson (5–8)	**Allen** (21)	25,407	58–48	W1

August: 19–9 (Home: 10–4; Away: 9–5)

#	Date	Opponent	Score	Win	Loss	Save	Attendance	Record	Streak
107	August 1	@ Twins	2–0	**Carrasco** (13–5)	Magill (2–2)	**Hand** (26)	29,261	59–48	W2
108	August 3	Angels	4–7	Anderson (3–2)	**Pérez** (0–1)	—	35,242	59–49	L1
109	August 4	Angels	3–0	**Kluber** (14–6)	Pena (1–3)	—	34,814	60–49	W1
110	August 5	Angels	4–3	**Bieber** (6–2)	McGuire (0–2)	**Hand** (27)	28,993	61–49	W2
111	August 6	Twins	10–0	**Bauer** (11–6)	Gibson (5–9)	—	18,620	62–49	W3
112	August 7	Twins	2–3	Mejia (2–0)	**Carrasco** (13–6)	Rodney (25)	19,921	62–50	L1
113	August 8	Twins	5–2	**Allen** (4–4)	Hildenberger (2–3)	—	25,476	63–50	W1
114	August 9	Twins	5–4	**Miller** (2–3)	Reed (1–6)	—	25,942	64–50	W2
115	August 10	@ White Sox	0–1	Fry (1–2)	**Ramirez** (0–2)	—	18,772	64–51	L1
116	August 11	@ White Sox	3–1	**Bauer** (12–6)	Shields (4–14)	**Allen** (22)	28,061	65–51	W1
117	August 12	@ White Sox	9–7	**Carrasco** (14–6)	Covey (4–9)	**Allen** (23)	23,853	66–51	W2
118	August 13	@ Reds	10–3	**Clevinger** (8–7)	Bailey (1v10)	—	20,607	67–51	W3
119	August 14	@ Reds	8–1	**Kluber** (15–6)	Romano (7–10)	—	19,034	68–51	W4
120	August 15	@ Reds	4–3	**Otero** (2–1)	Reed (0–1)	**Hand** (28)	17,275	69–51	W5
121	August 17	Orioles	2–1	**Carrasco** (15–6)	Hess (2–7)	**Allen** (24)	28,264	70–51	W6
122	August 18	Orioles	2–4	Cobb (4–15)	**Plutko** (4–3)	—	35,007	70–52	L1
123	August 19	Orioles	8–0	**Clevinger** (9–7)	Ramirez (1–5)	—	30,555	71–52	W1
124	August 20	@ Red Sox	5–4	**Kluber** (16–6)	Porcello (15–6)	**Allen** (25)	37,274	72–52	W2
125	August 21	@ Red Sox	6–3	**Bieber** (7–2)	Eovaldi (5–5)	**Hand** (29)	37,188	73–52	W3
126	August 22	@ Red Sox	4–10	Barnes (5–3)	**Carrasco** (15–7)	—	37,107	73–53	L1
127	August 23	@ Red Sox	0–7	Price (14–6)	**Plutko** (4–4)	—	37,396	73–54	L2
128	August 24	@ Royals	4–5	Peralta (1–0)	**Allen** (4–5)	—	19,304	73–55	L3
129	August 25	@ Royals	1–7	Fillmyer (2–1)	**Kluber** (16–7)	—	16,894	73–56	L4
130	August 26	@ Royals	12–5	**Bieber** (8–2)	López (0–4)	—	18,575	74–56	W1
131	August 28	Twins	8–1	**Carrasco** (16–7)	Gibson (7–11)	—	19,194	75–56	W2
132	August 29	Twins	3–4	May (3–0)	**Allen** (4–6)	Hildenberger (5)	20,398	75–57	L1
133	August 30	Twins	5–3	**Clevinger** (10–7)	Odorizzi (5–9)	**Hand** (30)	20,244	76–57	W1
134	August 31	Rays	3–0	**Kluber** (17–7)	Glasnow (1–4)	**Hand** (31)	25,639	77–57	W1

September: 14–14 (Home: 7–7; Away: 7–7)

#	Date	Opponent	Score	Win	Loss	Save	Attendance	Record	Streak
135	September 1	Rays	3–5	Snell (17–5)	**Bieber** (8–3)	Kolarek (2)	31,816	77–58	L1
136	September 2	Rays	4–6	Yarbrough (13–5)	**Carrasco** (16–8)	Alvarado (7)	26,535	77–59	L2
137	September 3	Royals	1–5	Junis (8–12)	**Plutko** (4–5)	Hill (2)	20,536	77–60	L3
138	September 4	Royals	9–3	**Clevinger** (11–7)	Duffy (8–12)	—	17,041	78–60	W1
139	September 5	Royals	3–1	**Kluber** (18–7)	Keller (7–6)	**Hand** (32)	18,435	79–60	W2
140	September 6	@ Blue Jays	9–4	**Bieber** (9–3)	Gaviglio (3–8)	—	20,618	80–60	W3
141	September 7	@ Blue Jays	2–3 (11)	Barnes (3–2)	**Cimber** (3–6)	—	26,830	80–61	L1
142	September 8	@ Blue Jays	9–8	**Tomlin** (1–5)	Reid-Foley (1–3)	**Allen** (26)	35,353	81–61	W1
143	September 9	@ Blue Jays	2–6	Pannone (2–1)	**Clevinger** (11–8)	Giles (20)	31,184	81–62	L1
144	September 10	@ Rays	5–6	Schultz (2–0)	**Hand** (2–5)	—	12,724	81–63	L2
145	September 11	@ Rays	2-0	**Bieber** (10–3)	Glasnow (1–6)	**Allen** (27)	10,599	82–63	W1
146	September 12	@ Rays	1–3	Snell (19–5)	**Carrasco** (16–9)	Alvarado (8)	10,654	82–64	L1
147	September 14	Tigers	4–5	VerHagen (3–2)	**Cimber** (3–7)	Greene (29)	26,952	82–65	L2
148	September 15	Tigers	15–0	**Clevinger** (12–8)	Fulmer (3–12)	—	26,532	83–65	W1
149	September 16	Tigers	4–6	Liriano (5–10)	**Bieber** (10–4)	Greene (30)	24,862	83–66	L1
150	September 18	White Sox	5–3	**Kluber** (19–7)	Rodon (6–6)	**Miller** (2)	19,277	84–66	W1
151	September 19	White Sox	4–1	**Pérez** (1–1)	Frare (0–1)	—	18,263	85–66	W2
152	September 20	White Sox	4–5 (11)	Santiago (6–3)	**Cimber** (3–8)	—	19,457	85–67	L1
153	September 21	Red Sox	5–7	Barnes (6–3)	**Bieber** (10–5)	Kimbrel (42)	27,892	85–68	L2
154	September 22	Red Sox	5–4 (11)	**Olson** (2–1)	Pomeranz (2–6)	—	35,095	86–68	W1
155	September 23	Red Sox	4–3 (11)	**Tomlin** (2–5)	Cuevas (0–2)	—	27,879	87–68	W2
156	September 24	@ White Sox	4–0	**Kluber** (20–7)	Hamilton (0–2)	—	18,217	88–68	W3
157	September 25	@ White Sox	4–5	Hamilton (1–2)	**Carrasco** (16–10)	—	17,040	88–69	L1
158	September 26	@ White Sox	10–2	**Bieber** (11–5)	Fry (2–3)	—	25,598	89–69	W1
159	September 27	@ Royals	1–2 (10)	Hammel (4–14)	**Ramírez** (0–3)	—	19,262	89–70	L1
160	September 28	@ Royals	14–6	**Clevinger** (13–8)	Kennedy (3–9)	—	15,920	90–70	W1
161	September 29	@ Royals	4–9	Junis (9–12)	**Miller** (2–4)	—	23,324	90–71	L1
162	September 30	@ Royals	2–1	**Carrasco** (17–10)	Skoglund (1–6)	**Bauer** (1)	19,690	91– 71	W1

Legend: = Win = Loss = Postponement
Bold = Indians team member

== Postseason ==
=== Game log ===
2018 Postseason: 0−3 (Home 0−1; Away 0−2)
American League Division Series: 0−3 (Home 0–1; Away 0–2)

#	Date	Opponent	Score	Win	Loss	Save	Attendance	Record
1	October 5	@ Astros	2–7	Verlander (1-0)	**Kluber** (0-1)	-	43,514	0–1
2	October 6	@ Astros	1–3	Cole (1-0)	**Carrasco** (0-1)	Osuna (1)	43,520	0–2
3	October 8	Astros	3–11	McHugh (1-0)	**Bauer** (1-0)	-	37,252	0–3

Legend: = Win = Loss = Postponement
Bold = Indians team member

=== Postseason rosters ===
Playoff rosters
American League Division Series

- Pitchers: 24 Andrew Miller 28 Corey Kluber 33 Brad Hand 37 Cody Allen 39 Óliver Pérez 47 Trevor Bauer 52 Mike Clevinger 57 Shane Bieber 59 Carlos Carrasco 61 Dan Otero 90 Adam Cimber
- Catchers: 7 Yan Gomes 55 Roberto Pérez
- Infielders: 11 José Ramírez 12 Francisco Lindor 17 Yonder Alonso 27 Josh Donaldson 36 Yandy Díaz
- Outfielders: 1 Greg Allen 6 Brandon Guyer 22 Jason Kipnis 23 Michael Brantley 26 Rajai Davis 53 Melky Cabrera
- Designated hitters: 10 Edwin Encarnación

== Player stats ==
Note: Team batting and pitching leaders in each category are in bold.

Note: * = League leader in category.

=== Batting ===
Note: G = Games played; AB = At bats; R = Runs scored; H = Hits; 2B = Doubles; 3B = Triples; HR = Home runs; RBI = Runs batted in; BB = Walks; AVG = Batting average; SB = Stolen bases

Player	G	AB	R	H	2B	3B	HR	RBI	BB	AVG	SB
Greg Allen	91	265	36	68	11	3	2	20	14	.257	21
Yonder Alonso	145	516	64	129	19	0	23	83	51	.250	0
Brandon Barnes	19	19	2	5	0	0	1	2	2	.263	0
Michael Brantley	143	570	89	176	36	2	17	76	48	**.309**	12
Melky Cabrera	78	250	28	70	17	0	6	39	20	.280	1
Lonnie Chisenhall	29	84	11	27	6	1	1	9	8	.321	1
Rajai Davis	101	196	33	44	6	1	1	6	11	.224	21
Yandy Díaz	39	109	15	34	5	2	1	15	11	.312	0
Josh Donaldson	16	50	8	14	3	0	3	7	10	.280	0
Edwin Encarnación	137	500	74	123	16	1	32	**107**	63	.246	3
Yan Gomes	112	403	52	107	26	0	16	48	21	.266	0
Erik González	81	136	17	36	10	1	1	16	5	.265	3
Brandon Guyer	103	194	25	40	11	0	7	27	15	.206	1
Eric Haase	9	16	0	2	0	0	0	1	0	.125	0
Jason Kipnis	147	530	65	122	28	1	18	75	60	.230	7
Francisco Lindor	**158**	**661***	**129***	**183**	**42**	2	38	92	70	.277	**25**
Leonys Martín	6	15	3	5	0	0	2	4	1	.333	0
Francisco Mejía	1	2	0	0	0	0	0	0	2	.000	0
Tyler Naquin	61	174	22	46	7	0	3	23	6	.264	1
Roberto Pérez	62	179	16	30	9	1	2	19	21	.168	1
José Ramírez	157	578	110	156	38	**4**	**39**	105	**106**	.270	34
Adam Rosales	13	19	4	4	1	0	1	2	1	.211	0
Bradley Zimmer	34	106	14	24	5	0	2	9	7	.226	4
Pitcher totals	162	23	1	2	1	0	0	1	1	.087	0
**Team totals**	**162**	**5595**	**818**	**1447**	**297**	**19**	**216**	**786**	**554**	**.259**	**135**

=== Pitching ===
Note: W = Wins; L = Losses; ERA = Earned run average; G = Games pitched; GS = Games started; SV = Saves; IP = Innings pitched; H = Hits allowed; R = Total runs allowed; ER = Earned runs allowed; BB = Walks allowed; K = Strikeouts

Player	W	L	ERA	G	GS	SV	IP	H	R	ER	BB	K
Cody Allen	4	6	4.70	**70**	0	**27**	67.0	58	35	35	33	80
Trevor Bauer	12	6	**2.21**	28	27	1	175.1	134	51	43	57	221
Matt Belisle	0	0	5.06	8	0	0	10.2	9	6	6	1	4
Jeff Beliveau	0	0	11.57	9	0	1	4.2	7	6	6	5	2
Shane Bieber	11	5	4.55	20	19	0	114.2	130	60	58	23	118
Carlos Carrasco	17	**10**	3.38	32	30	0	192.0	173	**78**	**72**	43	**231**
Adam Cimber	0	3	4.05	28	0	0	20.0	26	9	9	7	7
Mike Clevinger	13	8	3.02	32	32	0	200.0	164	71	67	**67**	207
Oliver Drake	0	0	12.46	4	0	0	4.1	7	6	6	1	4
Jon Edwards	0	0	3.12	9	0	0	8.2	6	4	3	4	10
Nick Goody	0	2	6.94	12	0	0	11.2	15	9	9	5	12
Brandon Guyer	0	0	0.00	1	0	0	1.0	0	0	0	0	0
Brad Hand	0	1	2.28	28	0	8	27.2	19	7	7	13	41
Corey Kluber	**20**	7	2.89	33	**33**	0	**215.0**	**179**	75	69	34	22
George Kontos	0	0	3.38	6	0	0	5.1	3	2	2	2	4
Evan Marshall	0	0	7.71	10	0	0	7.0	12	6	6	4	9
Zach McAllister	1	2	4.97	41	0	0	41.2	47	25	23	10	34
Andrew Miller	2	4	4.24	37	0	2	34.0	31	16	16	16	45
Alexi Ogando	0	1	18.00	1	0	0	1.0	2	2	2	3	1
Tyler Olson	2	1	4.94	43	0	0	27.1	26	16	15	12	40
Dan Otero	2	1	5.22	61	0	1	58.2	69	36	34	5	43
Óliver Pérez	1	1	1.37	51	0	0	32.1	17	6	5	7	43
Adam Plutko	4	5	5.28	17	12	1	76.2	78	45	45	23	60
Neil Ramírez	0	3	4.54	47	0	0	41.2	36	21	21	18	51
Marc Rzepczynski	0	0	0.00	5	0	0	2.2	3	0	0	1	1
Ben Taylor	0	0	6.00	6	0	0	6.0	6	4	4	1	8
Josh Tomlin	2	5	6.14	32	9	0	70.1	92	52	48	12	46
**Team totals**	**91**	**71**	**3.77**	**162**	**162**	**41**	**1457.1**	**1349**	**648**	**611**	**407**	**1544**

== Farm system ==
Level	Team	League	Manager
AAA	Columbus Clippers	International League	Chris Tremie
AA	Akron RubberDucks	Eastern League	Tony Mansolino
A-Advanced	Lynchburg Hillcats	Carolina League	Rouglas Odor
A	Lake County Captains	Midwest League	Luke Carlin
A-Short Season	Mahoning Valley Scrappers	New York–Penn League	Jim Pankovits
Rookie	AZL Indians	Arizona League	Larry Day
Rookie	DSL Indians	Dominican Summer League	Jose Mejia
Rookie	DSL Indians / Brewers	Dominican Summer League	

== See also ==
- List of Cleveland Indians team records
