= Luis Avilán =

Venezuelan baseball player (born 1989)

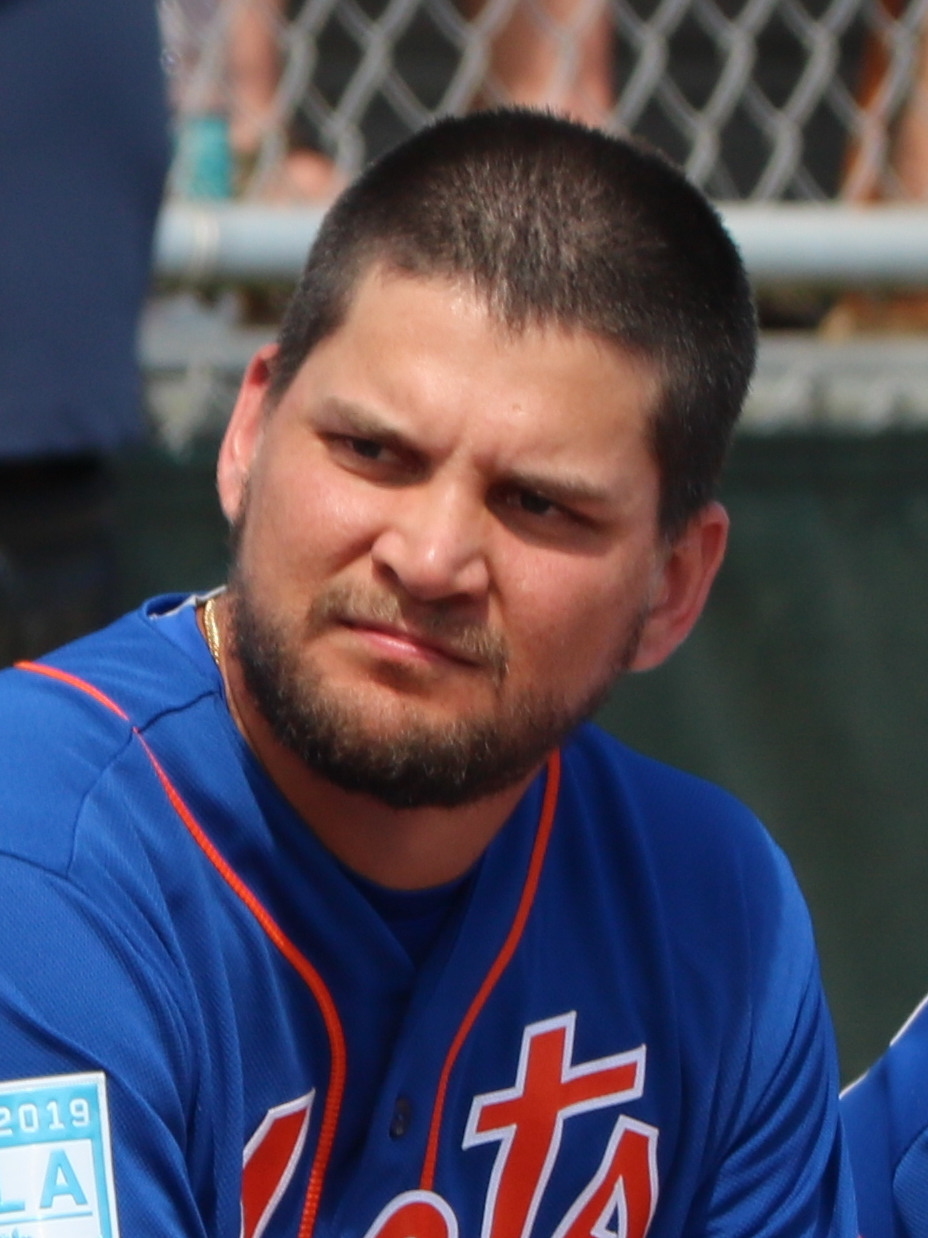
- Avilán with the Mets in 2019
- Pitcher
- Born: July 19, 1989 (age 37); Caracas, Venezuela
- Batted: Left Threw: Left

MLB debut
- July 14, 2012, for the Atlanta Braves

Last MLB appearance
- April 15, 2021, for the Washington Nationals

MLB statistics
- Win–loss record: 23–11
- Earned run average: 3.43
- Strikeouts: 319
- Stats at Baseball Reference

Teams
- Atlanta Braves (2012–2015); Los Angeles Dodgers (2015–2017); Chicago White Sox (2018); Philadelphia Phillies (2018); New York Mets (2019); New York Yankees (2020); Washington Nationals (2021)

Luis Armando Avilán (born July 19, 1989) is a Venezuelan former professional baseball pitcher. He played in Major League Baseball (MLB) for the Atlanta Braves, Los Angeles Dodgers, Chicago White Sox, Philadelphia Phillies, New York Mets, New York Yankees, and Washington Nationals.

== Professional career ==
=== Atlanta Braves ===
Avilán signed with the Atlanta Braves as an international free agent in 2005 and he began his professional career the following year with the Braves affiliate in the Dominican Summer League. In 2008, he joined the Gulf Coast Braves, his first assignment to a domestic team. He was the GCL Braves pitcher of the month for August when he had a 2.93 ERA in three starts. In 2009, he was promoted to the Danville Braves of the Appalachian League, where he made 14 appearances, including three starts and had a 3.05 ERA with two saves. In 2010, he made 41 appearances between the Rome Braves of the South Atlantic League and the Myrtle Beach Pelicans of the Carolina League and was a combined 6–4 with a 4.33 ERA in 41 games. He also saved nine games that season as the closer for Myrtle Beach. In 2011, with the Mississippi Braves of the Southern League, he was 4–8 with a 4.57 ERA in 36 appearances, including 13 starts.

The Braves added him to their 40-man roster after the 2011 season to protect him from the Rule 5 draft. He began the 2012 season in Mississippi, where he was 3–6 with a 3.23 ERA 16 games (12 starts). He was promoted to the Triple-A Gwinnett Braves of the International League on July 4, 2012, but did not make an appearance for them.

On July 5, 2012, Avilán was called up by the Braves to replace the injured Jonny Venters. He made his first appearance on July 14 against the New York Mets, striking out the only batter he faced (Ike Davis). His first career win came on October 3 against the Pittsburgh Pirates on the final day of the season. In 31 appearances that season for the Braves, he had an ERA of 2.00.

Avilán made 75 appearances in 2013 (4th in the NL), posting a 1.52 earned run average with a .144 batting average against and .219 on base percentage. In addition, he made appearances in all four games of the 2013 NLDS against the Los Angeles Dodgers, allowing three hits and no runs in 2 2/3 innings.

However, he struggled through the first half of the 2014 season, recording a 4.85 ERA in 47 games. Avilán was demoted to Triple A Gwinnett on July 19, 2014, and replaced by Chasen Shreve. He would finish the 2014 season with a 4.57 ERA in 62 games. 2015 was kinder to Avilán in a Braves uniform, as in 50 appearances, he posted a 3.58 ERA with a 1.20 WHIP. During his time with the Braves, Radio Announcer Don Sutton would often sing Avilan's name in a sing-song manner to the tune of Feliz Navidad.

=== Los Angeles Dodgers ===
On July 30, 2015, in a three-team trade, the Los Angeles Dodgers acquired Avilán, Mat Latos, Michael Morse, Bronson Arroyo, Alex Wood, Jim Johnson, and José Peraza, while the Miami Marlins acquired minor league pitchers Victor Araujo, Jeff Brigham, and Kevin Guzman, and the Braves received Héctor Olivera, Paco Rodriguez, minor league pitcher Zachary Bird and a competitive balance draft pick for the 2016 MLB draft. He pitched in 23 games for the Dodgers with a 5.17 ERA.

At the conclusion of the season, the Dodgers signed him to a one-year, $1.39 million, contract to avoid salary arbitration though he began the season with the Triple-A Oklahoma City Dodgers after experiencing control problems in spring training. He split the season between the minors and the majors, appearing in 33 games for Oklahoma City, with a 4.24 ERA and 27 games for Los Angeles, with a 3.20 ERA. He also pitched in 3 2/3 innings in the playoffs between the 2016 National League Division Series and the 2016 National League Championship Series, without allowing any earned runs. He signed a $1.5 million contract for 2017, avoiding salary arbitration.

Avilán spent the entire 2017 season in the Dodgers bullpen. In 61 games, he had a 2–3 record and 2.93 ERA. He felt some pain in his shoulder in September, leading to a diagnosis of "shoulder inflammation." As a result, he was left off the Dodgers playoff roster.

=== Chicago White Sox ===
On January 4, 2018, Avilán was traded to the Chicago White Sox in a three-team trade that also sent Jake Peter and Scott Alexander to the Dodgers, Joakim Soria to the White Sox, and Trevor Oaks and Erick Mejia to the Kansas City Royals.

=== Philadelphia Phillies ===
On August 22, 2018, Avilán was traded to the Philadelphia Phillies in exchange for minor league pitcher Felix Paulino. Between the two teams, in 2018 he was 2–1 with two saves and a 3.77 ERA. He threw a change-up 48.1% of the time, tops in MLB. He elected free agency on November 30. In his career through 2018 he had held left-handed batters to a batting average of .213, and right-handed batters to a batting average of .244.

=== New York Mets ===
On January 10, 2019, Avilán signed a minor league deal with the New York Mets that included an invitation to spring training. He made the team and had his contract purchased for opening day. On April 15, 2019, Avilán earned his first victory as a Met in a game against the Philadelphia Phillies. On the season, he registered an 5.06 ERA with 30 strikeouts in 32.0 innings of work. He elected free agency on October 31, 2019.

=== New York Yankees ===
On February 3, 2020, Avilán signed a minor league contract with the New York Yankees. On July 21, Avilán had his contract selected to the 40-man roster. On August 28, Avilán was released by the Yankees two days after being placed on the injured list due to shoulder inflammation. He had pitched to a 4.32 ERA across 8 1/3 innings in 2020.

=== Washington Nationals ===
On December 14, 2020, Avilán signed a minor league contract with the Washington Nationals organization. On March 28, 2021, Avilán was selected to the 40-man roster. On April 17, it was announced that Avilán had suffered a tear in his left UCL, requiring Tommy John surgery and ending his season early. He was placed on the 60-day injured list on April 30. In 4 games for the Nationals in 2021, Avilán registered a 12.60 ERA with 4 strikeouts. Avilán became a free agent following the season and re-signed with the Nationals on a minor league contract on November 29, 2021.

In 2022, Avilán spent the season in the Nationals' minor league system. Playing in 36 games split between the High–A Wilmington Blue Rocks and Triple–A Rochester Red Wings, he recorded a cumulative 4.84 ERA with 39 strikeouts in 35 1/3 innings pitched. Avilán elected free agency following the season on November 10, 2022.

On October 20, 2023, Avilán retired from professional baseball.

== Coaching career ==
On February 18, 2024, Avilán was hired to serve as the assistant pitching coach for the Florida Complex League Phillies, the rookie-level affiliate of the Philadelphia Phillies.

== See also ==
- List of Major League Baseball players from Venezuela
