= Scott Alexander (baseball) =

American baseball player (born 1989)

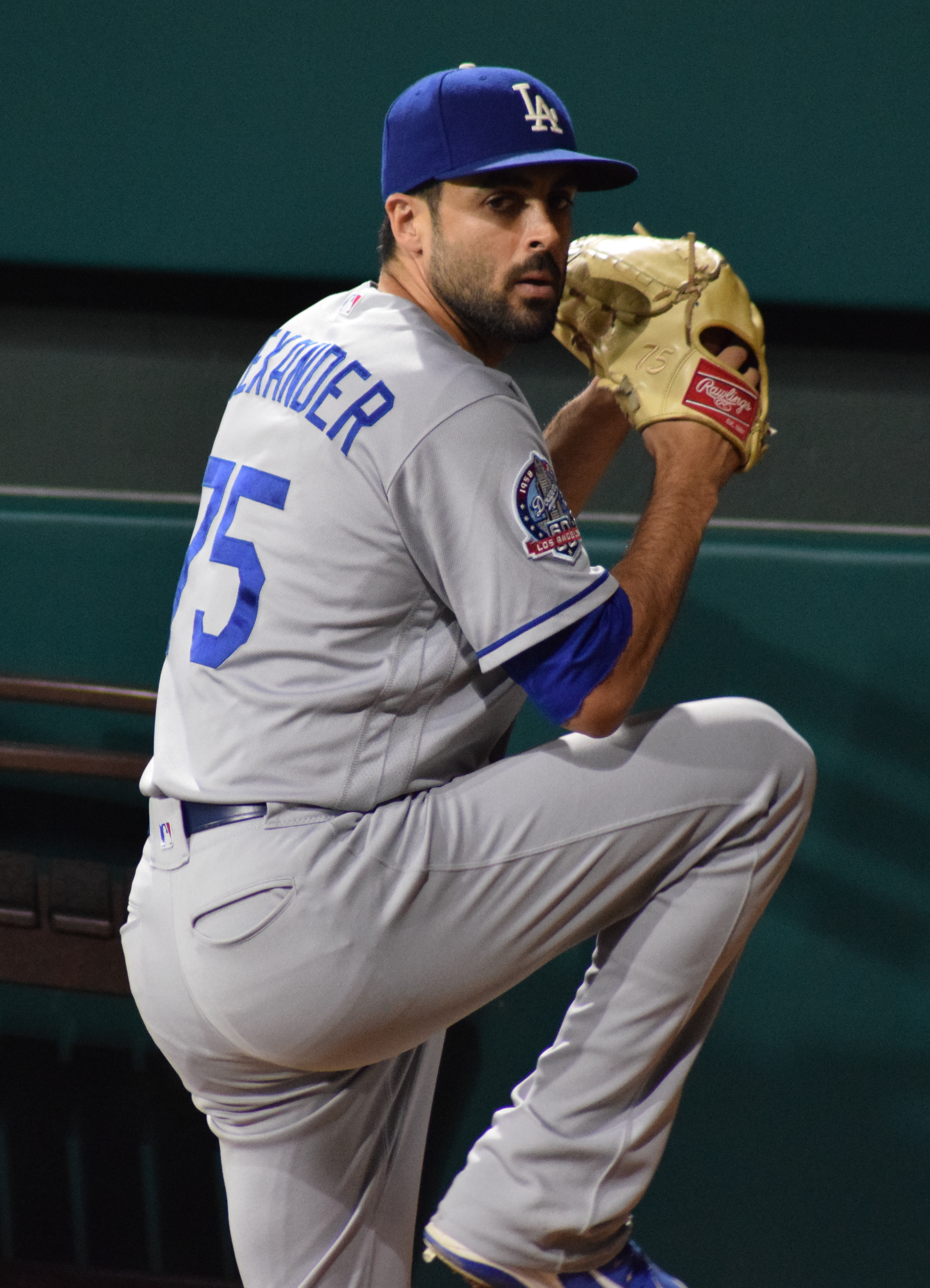
- Alexander with the Los Angeles Dodgers in 2018

Free agent
- Pitcher
- Born: July 10, 1989 (age 37); Santa Rosa, California, U.S.
- Bats: Left Throws: Left

MLB debut
- September 2, 2015, for the Kansas City Royals

MLB statistics (through 2025 season)
- Win–loss record: 21–16
- Earned run average: 3.36
- Strikeouts: 240
- Stats at Baseball Reference

Teams
- Kansas City Royals (2015–2017); Los Angeles Dodgers (2018–2021); San Francisco Giants (2022–2023); Oakland Athletics (2024); Colorado Rockies (2025); San Francisco Giants (2025)

Scott Alain Alexander (born July 10, 1989) is an American professional baseball pitcher who is a free agent. He has previously played in Major League Baseball (MLB) for the Kansas City Royals, Los Angeles Dodgers, San Francisco Giants, Oakland Athletics, and Colorado Rockies. Alexander played college baseball for Pepperdine University and Sonoma State University. He was selected by the Royals in the sixth round of the 2010 MLB draft, and made his MLB debut in 2015 with them.

== Career ==
=== Amateur career ===
Alexander played Little League Baseball and attended Cardinal Newman High School in Santa Rosa, California, where he was named the North Bay League player of the year as a senior. He set the school records for strikeouts in a season and a career and led them to the league championship in 2007.

He was drafted by the Cincinnati Reds in the 37th round of the 2007 Major League Baseball draft, but he did not sign and instead attended to play college baseball for the Pepperdine Waves. He was selected to the All-West Coast Conference freshman team in 2008 when he had a 7–4 win–loss record with a 4.95 earned run average (ERA) and struck out 106 batters. He was 4–5 with a 4.11 ERA as a sophomore, when he was used as both a starter and a reliever. Between his two seasons at Pepperdine, he played collegiate summer baseball for the La Crosse Loggers of the Northwoods League. After the 2009 season, he played with the Brewster Whitecaps of the Cape Cod Baseball League.

Despite describing his time at Pepperdine as a "great experience," he chose to transfer to Sonoma State University for his junior season in order to be closer to home and his ill grandmother. With the Seawolves, he was 3–6 with a 4.50 ERA in 13 starts with 70 strikeouts and was named the fourth-best NCAA Division II prospect by PGCrosschecker.com.

=== Kansas City Royals ===
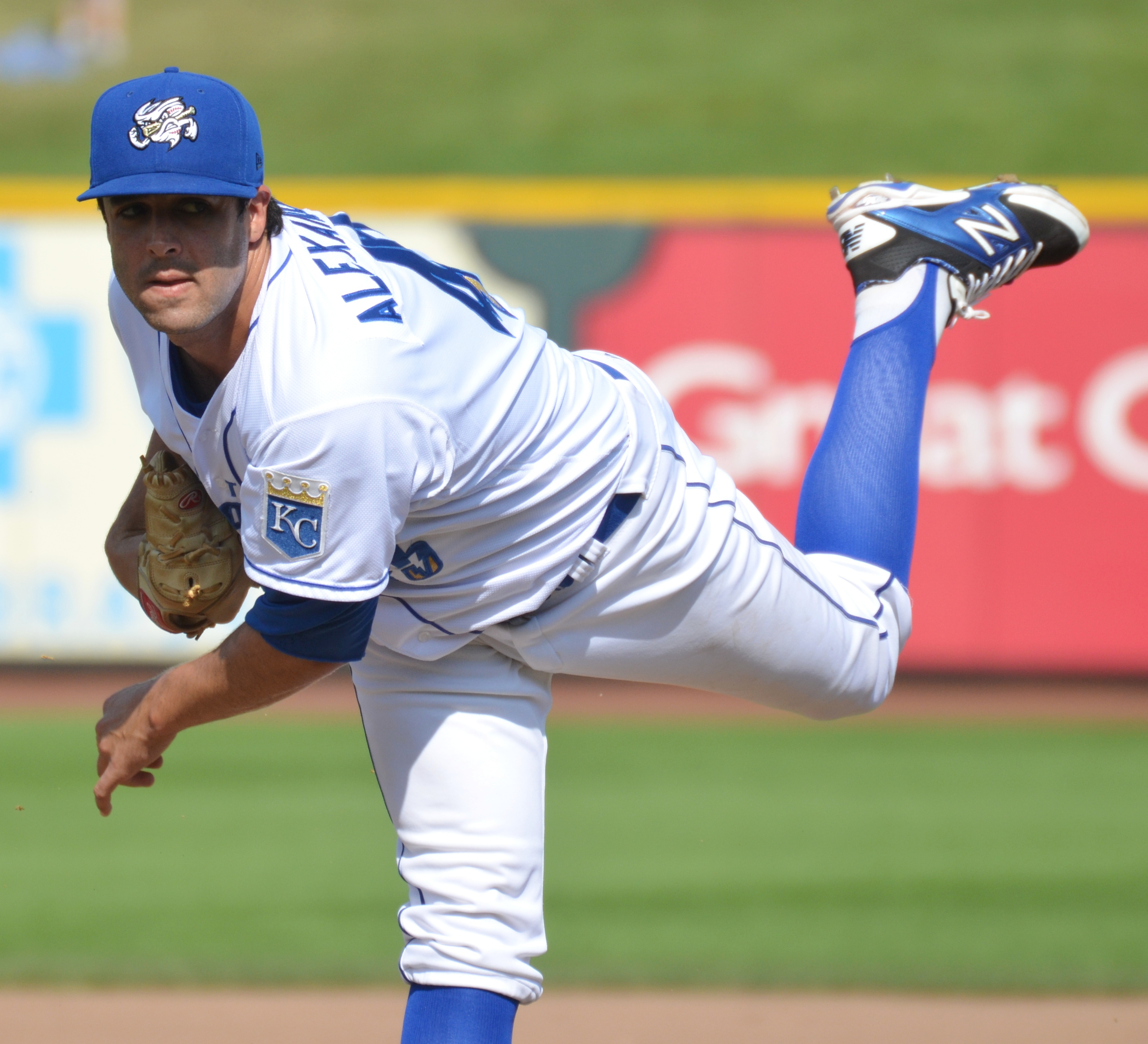
Alexander pitching for the Omaha Storm Chasers in 2014

The Kansas City Royals selected Alexander in the sixth round of the 2010 Major League Baseball draft, and he signed with the team on June 11 for a $130,000 signing bonus. He made his professional debut that season with the Idaho Falls Chukars of the Pioneer Baseball League, where he was 1–6 with a 5.73 ERA in 12 games (11 starts). He subsequently missed the entire 2011 season due to left shoulder surgery, and returned in 2012 to pitch in 10 games (six starts) for the Kane County Cougars of the Midwest League, where he had a 2.55 ERA.

Alexander moved between three levels in the Royals farm system in 2013, with five games for the Lexington Legends of the South Atlantic League, 12 for the Wilmington Blue Rocks of the Carolina League, and 24 for the Northwest Arkansas Naturals of the Texas League. Overall, he was 5–1 with a 3.00 ERA and appeared exclusively out of the bullpen. He did not allow a home run all season and had the second-most innings pitched in the minor leagues (75) without a homer.

In 2015, he pitched in 35 games for the Naturals and 11 for the Omaha Storm Chasers of the Pacific Coast League. He finished 2–4 with a 4.52 ERA in 67 2/3 innings. He pitched for the Gigantes del Cibao of the Dominican Winter League after the season and then returned to Omaha for 2015, where he was 2–3 with a 2.56 ERA in 63 1/3 innings over 41 games. The Royals selected him as their Triple-A Pitcher of the Year.

Alexander was called up to the majors for the first time on September 1, 2015, and he made his MLB debut the following day against the Detroit Tigers. He pitched a scoreless ninth inning, retiring two batters on groundouts and then striking out Nick Castellanos to end the game. He pitched in six innings over four games for the Royals that season, allowing three runs on five hits with three strikeouts.

In 2016, he pitched in 22 games for Omaha and 17 for the Royals. In the minors, he was 2–0 with a 3.00 ERA in 30 innings, and in the majors he had a 3.32 ERA in 19 innings.

He made seven more appearances in the minors in 2017 but spent most of the year with the Royals, where he was 5–4 with a 2.48 ERA in 69 innings over 58 games. He picked up his first MLB win on July 2 when he pitched two scoreless innings against the Minnesota Twins and his first save on August 22 against the Colorado Rockies.

=== Los Angeles Dodgers ===
On January 4, 2018, Alexander was traded to the Los Angeles Dodgers in a three-team trade that also sent Jake Peters to the Dodgers, Luis Avilán and Joakim Soria to the Chicago White Sox, and Trevor Oaks and Erick Mejia to the Royals. The Dodgers used Alexander as an opener on June 1 due to an injury to Clayton Kershaw. In his first season in L.A, Alexander was 2–1 with three saves as he appeared in 73 games (8th-most in the NL), allowing 27 earned runs in 66 innings for a 3.68 ERA. He appeared in four games in the postseason for the Dodgers, one in the NLDS, and three in the World Series, allowing two runs to score on one hit and two walks in 2 1/3 innings pitched.

In 2019, he pitched in 28 games for the Dodgers, with a 3–2 record and 3.63 ERA in 17 1/3innings. Alexander went on the injured list (IL) on June 12 as a result of left forearm inflammation, which turned out to be a nerve issue. He underwent season-ending surgery to address the issue in September. Despite the injuries, the Dodgers inked him to a one-year, $875,000, contract following the season, to avoid arbitration.

Alexander appeared in 13 games for the Dodgers in 2020, going 2–0 while allowing nine hits and four earned runs for a 2.92 ERA in 12 1/3 innings. He was optioned off the active roster on September 2 and spent the remainder of the pandemic-shortened season at the Dodgers alternate training site.

Alexander had a 2.31 ERA in 13 appearances for the Dodgers in 2021 before he was placed on the 60-day IL on June 9, with left shoulder inflammation. The Dodgers outrighted him to the minors and removed him from the 40-man roster on November 5. Alexander rejected the outright assignment and elected free agency.

=== San Francisco Giants ===
On May 4, 2022, Alexander signed a minor league deal with the San Francisco Giants. Pitching for three Giants’ minor league teams, he was 3–0 with a 0.66 ERA in 13 2/3 innings. He was selected to the major league roster on August 26 and was 0–0 with two saves and a 1.04 ERA in 17 1/3 innings with one walk over 17 games. In November, he signed a one-year deal with the Giants for $1.15 million.

Alexander won a career-high six consecutive decisions from April 11 to July 18, 2023. During that stretch, he went on the IL for almost a month with a strained left hamstring. His season ended on September 22 when he went back on the IL with the same injury. He was 7–3 with a 4.66 ERA in 48 1/3 innings. All his losses came as a starter.

=== Oakland Athletics ===
On February 14, 2024, Alexander signed a one-year, $2.25 million contract with the Oakland Athletics. Injured during spring training, Alexander began the 2024 season on the 15-day IL with a left-rib contusion. In 45 appearances for Oakland, he had a 1–3 record and 2.56 ERA with 31 strikeouts across 38 2/3 innings pitched.

=== Colorado Rockies ===
On February 19, 2025, Alexander signed a one-year, $2 million contract with the Colorado Rockies. In 19 appearances for Colorado, he had a 1–1 record and 6.06 ERA with six strikeouts across 16 1/3 innings pitched. On May 23, Alexander was designated for assignment by the Rockies. He was released by the team on May 26.

=== San Francisco Giants (second stint) ===
On June 10, 2025, Alexander signed a minor league contract with the San Francisco Giants. In seven appearances for the Triple-A Sacramento River Cats, he struggled to a 13.50 ERA with three strikeouts over 5 1/3 innings pitched. On July 5, the Giants selected Alexander's contract, adding him to their active roster. He made two appearances for San Francisco, recording a 6.75 ERA with two strikeouts over 1 1/3 innings pitched. On July 18, Alexander sent outright to the minors. However, he rejected the assignment and elected free agency.

=== Long Island Ducks ===
On May 4, 2026, Alexander signed with the Long Island Ducks of the Atlantic League of Professional Baseball. Alexander made 23 appearances for Long Island, recording a 2.49 ERA with 25 strikeouts across 21 2/3 innings pitched.

=== Kansas City Royals (second stint) ===
On July 14, 2026, Alexander signed a minor league contract with the Kansas City Royals. In 15 games (1 start) between Triple-A and Rookie ball he threw 14 innings going 0-2 with a 1.93 ERA and 14 strikeouts. He elected free agency on November 2.

== Personal life ==
Alexander has Type 1 diabetes, a condition that was diagnosed during the 2016 season. He has three brothers, all of whom played baseball. His older brother, Stu was drafted by the Florida Marlins in the 29th round of the 2003 Major League Baseball draft and played in their minor league system until 2009. His younger brother, Jason, currently pitches for the Houston Astros.
