= Erick Mejia =

Dominican baseball player (born 1994)

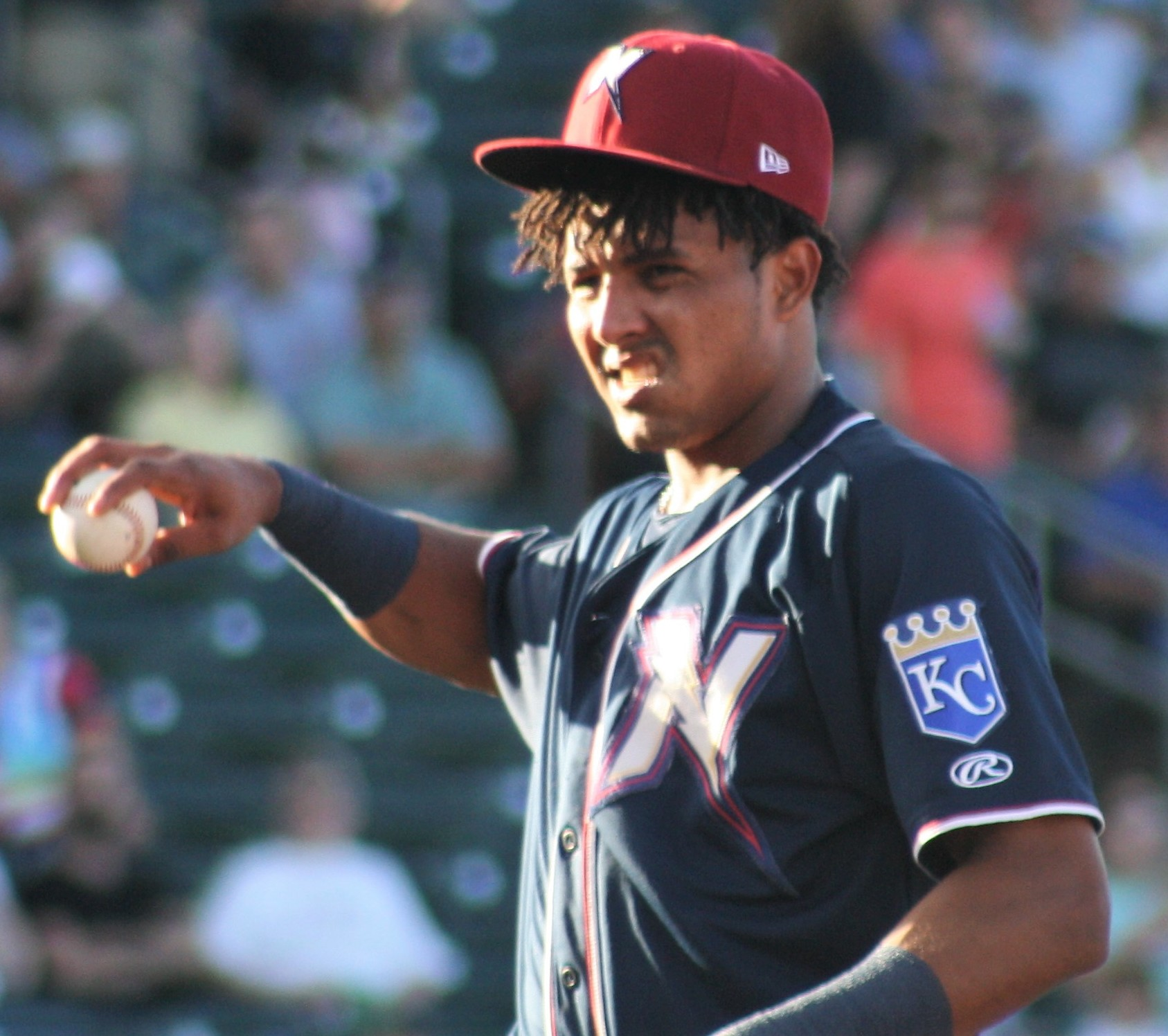
- Mejia in 2018

Free agent
- Pitcher / Infielder / Outfielder
- Born: November 9, 1994 (age 31); Villa Mella, Dominican Republic
- Bats: Switch Throws: Right

MLB debut
- September 5, 2019, for the Kansas City Royals

MLB statistics (through 2020 season)
- Batting average: .167
- Home runs: 0
- Runs batted in: 4
- Stats at Baseball Reference

Teams
- Kansas City Royals (2019–2020)

Career highlights and awards
- Tokyo 2020 All-Olympic Baseball Team (2021)
Medals
Men's baseball
Representing Dominican Republic
Olympic Games
Bronze medal – third place	2020 Tokyo	Team

Erick Augusto Mejia (born November 9, 1994) is a Dominican professional baseball pitcher and former infielder and outfielder who is a free agent. He has previously played in Major League Baseball (MLB) for the Kansas City Royals.

== Career ==
=== Seattle Mariners ===
Mejia was signed as an international free agent by the Seattle Mariners on June 30, 2012. Mejia played in the Seattle organization from 2013 through 2015. During his time with them, he played for the DSL Mariners, AZL Mariners, Everett AquaSox, Clinton LumberKings, and the Tacoma Rainiers.

=== Los Angeles Dodgers ===
Mejia was traded to the Los Angeles Dodgers in exchange for Joe Wieland on January 12, 2016. He was a post-season all-star with the Rancho Cucamonga Quakes in 2016 when he hit .287 in 124 games. He split the 2017 season between Rancho Cucamonga and the Tulsa Drillers.

=== Kansas City Royals ===
On January 4, 2018, Mejia was traded to the Kansas City Royals in a three team trade that also sent Jake Peter and Scott Alexander to the Dodgers, Joakim Soria, Luis Avilán, and cash considerations to the Chicago White Sox and Trevor Oaks to the Royals. Mejia spent the 2018 season with the Northwest Arkansas Naturals, hitting .263/.318/.367/.685 with 5 home runs and 59 RBI. He spent the 2019 minor league season with the Omaha Storm Chasers, hitting .271/.338/.382/.720 with 7 home runs and 63 RBI.

On September 3, 2019, the Royals selected Mejia's contract and promoted him to the major leagues. He made his major league debut on September 5 versus the Detroit Tigers. On December 2, 2019, Mejia was non-tendered and became a free agent, but re-signed with the Royals on a minor league contract on December 17.

Overall with the 2020 Kansas City Royals, Mejia batted .071 with no home runs and 0 RBIs in 8 games. On December 2, Mejia was nontendered by the Royals. On December 21, 2020, Mejia re-signed with the Royals on a minor league contract. Mejia spent the 2021 season with Triple-A Omaha. He played in 55 games, hitting .246 with 7 home runs and 30 RBI's. He became a free agent following the season on November 7, 2021.

=== Seattle Mariners (second stint) ===
On February 12, 2022, Mejia signed a minor league contract with the Seattle Mariners. In 120 games for the Triple–A Tacoma Rainiers, he batted .261/.330/.433 with a career–high 15 home runs, 58 RBI, and 19 stolen bases. He elected free agency following the season on November 10.

=== Washington Nationals ===
On November 19, 2022, Mejia signed a minor league contract with the Washington Nationals organization. He split the 2023 campaign between the High-A Wilmington Blue Rocks and Triple-A Rochester Red Wings, playing in 79 total games and hitting .238/.326/.399 with nine home runs, 34 RBI, and eight stolen bases. Mejia returned to Rochester in 2024, playing in 66 games and hitting .192/.292/.314 with five home runs, 25 RBI, and 13 stolen bases.

On March 8, 2025, it was announced that Mejia would be converting into a pitcher. He made 45 appearances out of the bullpen for Rochester, the Double-A Harrisburg Senators, and the Single-A Fredericksburg Nationals, accumulating a 1–0 record and 4.59 ERA with 58 strikeouts and two saves over 49 innings of work. Mejia elected free agency following the season on November 6.

On November 8, 2025, Mejia re-signed with the Nationals organization on a minor league contract. In 30 games across 3 levels of the minors he threw 33 innings of relief going 4-0 with a 1.09 ERA with 42 strikeouts and 6 saves. He elected free agency on November 2.
