= Kevin McCarthy (baseball) =

American baseball player (born 1992)

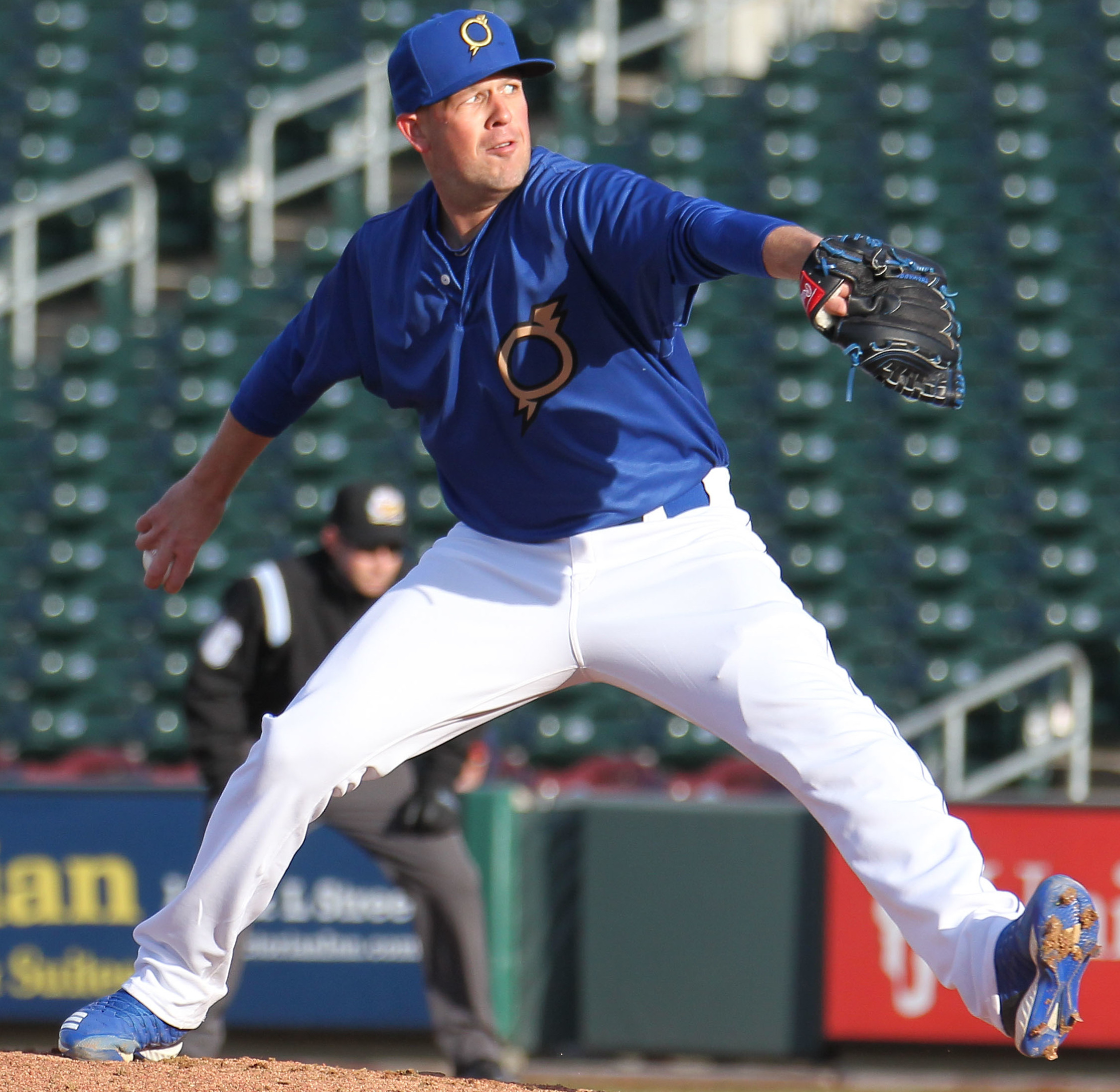
- McCarthy with the Omaha Storm Chasers in 2019
- Pitcher
- Born: February 22, 1992 (age 34); Rockville Centre, New York, U.S.
- Batted: Right Threw: Right

MLB debut
- September 9, 2016, for the Kansas City Royals

Last MLB appearance
- August 6, 2020, for the Kansas City Royals

MLB statistics
- Win–loss record: 11–6
- Earned run average: 3.80
- Strikeouts: 120
- Stats at Baseball Reference

Teams
- Kansas City Royals (2016–2020)

Kevin Edward McCarthy (born February 22, 1992) is an American former professional baseball pitcher. He played in Major League Baseball (MLB) for the Kansas City Royals. Listed at 6 feet 3 inches (1.91 m) and 210 pounds (95 kg), he throws and bats right-handed.

== Early years ==
McCarthy attended Kellenberg Memorial High School in Uniondale, New York, and played college baseball at Marist College. He was drafted by the Kansas City Royals in the 16th round of the 2013 Major League Baseball draft.

== Professional career ==
=== Kansas City Royals ===
McCarthy signed with the Royals and spent 2013 with the Burlington Royals where he was 4–2 with a 3.40 earned run average (ERA) in 42 1/3 innings pitched. He pitched in only two games in 2014 due to an injury. In 2015, he played for the Lexington Legends, Wilmington Blue Rocks, and Northwest Arkansas Naturals where he posted a 5–4 record and 2.74 ERA in 33 relief appearances. In 2016, he pitched with Northwest Arkansas and the Omaha Storm Chasers where he compiled a 5–6 record, 3.04 ERA, and 1.15 WHIP in 47 appearances out of the bullpen.

McCarthy was called up to the majors for the first time on September 6, 2016. He made his major league debut on September 9, appearing in the eighth inning during the Royals' 7–2 loss to the Chicago White Sox; he retired the only batter he faced. He made a total of 10 appearances with the 2016 Royals, accruing a 6.48 ERA with a 1–0 record and 7 strikeouts in 8 1/3 innings pitched.

In 2017, McCarthy split time between the minors and the Royals bullpen. In 33 games for the Royals, he again posted a 1–0 record, recording 27 strikeouts in 45 innings with a 3.20 ERA. In 2018, McCarthy appeared in 65 games, all in relief; he pitched to a 3.25 ERA and a 5–4 record, with 46 strikeouts in 72 innings pitched. McCarthy made the Royals' 2019 Opening Day roster. For the season, he compiled a 4–2 record and 4.48 ERA in 56 games, and 38 strikeouts in 60 1/3 innings pitched. With the 2020 Royals, McCarthy appeared in five games, registering no decisions with a 4.50 ERA and two strikeouts in six innings pitched.

On October 30, 2020, McCarthy was outrighted off the Royals roster; he became a free agent instead of accepting a Triple-A assignment. Overall, in parts of five seasons with Kansas City, he appeared in 169 games (all in relief) while striking out 120 batters in 191 2/3 innings pitched with a record of 11–6 and a 3.80 ERA.

=== Boston Red Sox ===
On November 16, 2020, McCarthy signed a minor league contract with the Boston Red Sox. McCarthy did not make the club out of Spring Training but chose not to trigger the opt-out clause in his contract.

McCarthy appeared in 28 games in 2021 for the Triple-A Worcester Red Sox, posting a 7.13 ERA with 35 strikeouts. On August 23, 2021, McCarthy was released by the Red Sox.

=== Chicago White Sox ===
On September 7, 2021, McCarthy signed a minor league deal with the Chicago White Sox. He was assigned to the Triple-A Charlotte Knights. He appeared in 7 games for Charlotte, struggling to a 7.04 ERA in 7.2 innings of work.

=== Chicago Cubs ===
On March 1, 2022, McCarthy signed a minor league deal with the Chicago Cubs organization. McCarthy logged 3 appearances for the Triple-A Iowa Cubs, struggling to a 9.00 ERA with 4 strikeouts in 4.0 innings pitched before he was released on May 3.

=== Cleburne Railroaders ===
On May 26, 2022, McCarthy signed with the Cleburne Railroaders of the American Association. McCarthy appeared in 45 contests for Cleburne, recording a 3-2 record and 4.80 ERA with 50 strikeouts and 2 saves in 60.0 innings pitched. McCarthy was released by the Railroaders on March 24, 2023.

=== Tecolotes de los Dos Laredos ===
On April 20, 2023, McCarthy signed with the Tecolotes de los Dos Laredos of the Mexican League. In 17 starts for Dos Laredos, he compiled a 6–7 record and 4.18 ERA with 47 strikeouts across 84 innings pitched.

McCarthy appeared in 18 games (15 starts) for the Tecolotes in 2024, registering a 3–4 record and 4.52 ERA with 31 strikeouts over 71 2/3 innings pitched.

=== Conspiradores de Querétaro ===
On November 13, 2024, McCarthy was loaned to the Conspiradores de Querétaro of the Mexican League. However he was released prior to the start of the season.
