= Trevor Oaks =

American baseball player (born 1993)

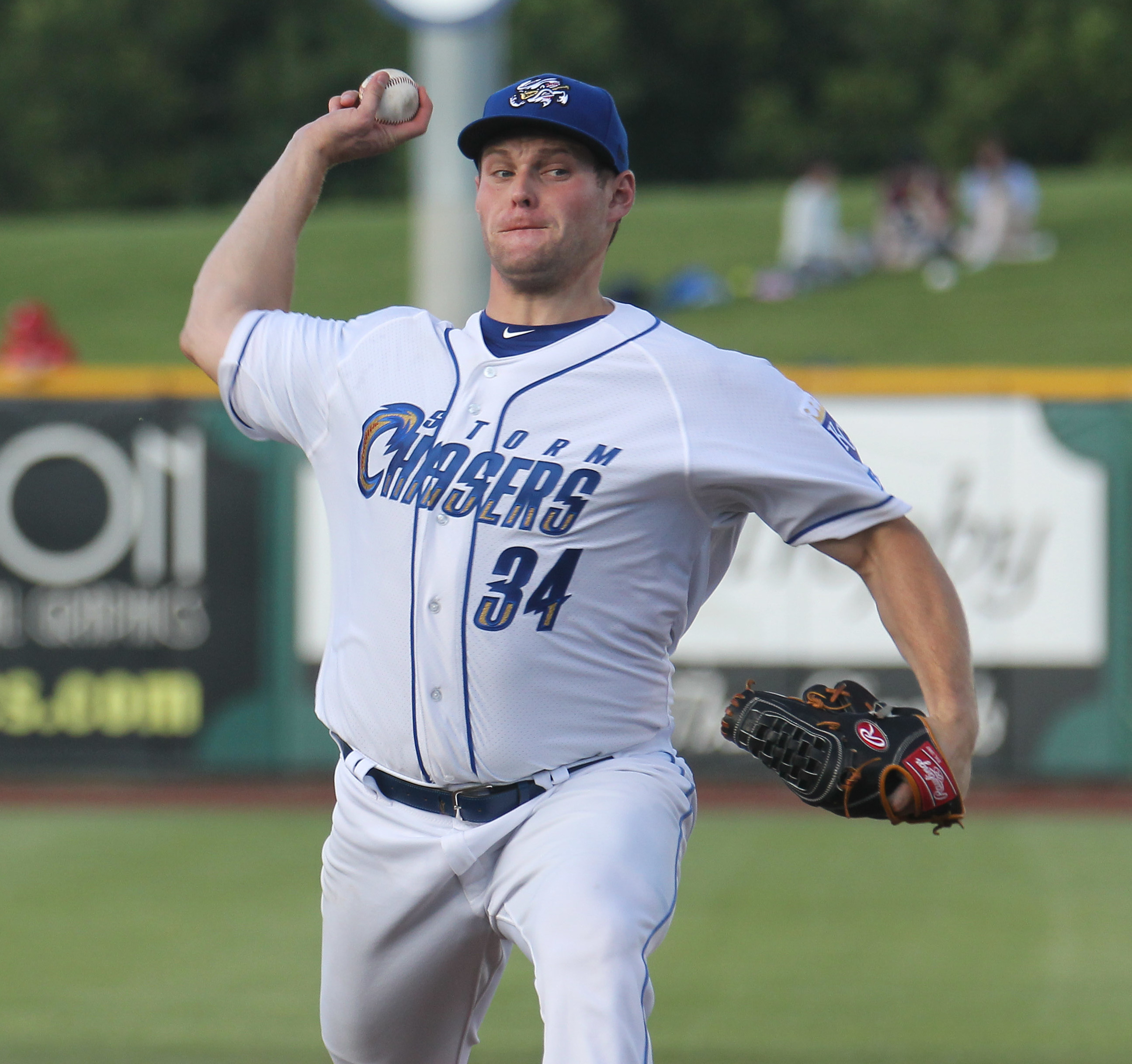
- Oaks with the Omaha Storm Chasers in 2018
- Pitcher
- Born: March 26, 1993 (age 33); Riverside, California, U.S.
- Batted: Right Threw: Right

MLB debut
- April 28, 2018, for the Kansas City Royals

Last MLB appearance
- July 4, 2018, for the Kansas City Royals

MLB statistics
- Win–loss record: 0–2
- Earned run average: 7.24
- Strikeouts: 10
- Stats at Baseball Reference

Teams
- Kansas City Royals (2018)

Trevor Scott Oaks (born March 26, 1993) is an American former professional baseball pitcher. He was drafted by the Los Angeles Dodgers in the 7th round of the 2014 MLB draft. He played one season in Major League Baseball (MLB) for the Kansas City Royals in 2018.

== Career ==
Oaks attended Woodcrest Christian High School in Riverside, California. He played one season of college baseball at Biola University. He then transferred to California Baptist University where he played for one season, with a 10-0 record and 1.68 ERA in 15 starts.

=== Los Angeles Dodgers ===
Oaks was drafted by the Los Angeles Dodgers in the 7th round, with the 219th overall selection, of the 2014 MLB draft, and signed for a signing bonus of $161,600.

Oaks began his professional career with the rookie-level Ogden Raptors in 2014, where he was 5–2 with a 6.81 ERA with 29 strikeouts in 14 games. In 2015, he pitched in 23 games (21 starts) between the Single-A Great Lakes Loons and High-A Rancho Cucamonga Quakes, and logged a cumulative 8–5 record and 2.65 ERA with 74 strikeouts across 125 2/3 innings pitched.

For the 2016 season, Oaks pitched in four games for the Quakes, and 10 each for the Double-A Tulsa Drillers and Triple-A Oklahoma City Dodgers, accumulating an aggregate 14–3 record and 2.74 ERA with 108 strikeouts over 152 innings of work. In 2017, he made 15 starts (and one relief appearance) for Oklahoma City and was 4–3 with a 3.64 ERA an 72 strikeouts. His season was cut short by an oblique injury suffered in July. The Dodgers added Oaks to the 40-man roster on November 20, 2017, in order to protect him from the Rule 5 draft.

=== Kansas City Royals ===
On January 4, 2018, Oaks was traded to the Kansas City Royals in a three-team trade that also sent Jake Peter and Scott Alexander to the Dodgers, Joakim Soria and Luis Avilán to the Chicago White Sox, and Erick Mejia to the Royals. He was recalled by the Royals on April 28, 2018, to make his major league debut as the starting pitcher against the White Sox. With the Triple-A [[Omaha Storm Chasers]], he was 8-8 with a 3.23 ERA and 70 strikeouts in 128 1/3 innings pitched over 22 starts. In four appearances (two starts) for the Royals during his rookie campaign, Oaks compiled an 0-2 record and 7.24 ERA with 10 strikeouts over 13 2/3 innings.

Oaks missed the 2019 season after undergoing surgery to repair the labrum in his right hip. On October 29, 2019, Oaks was activated from the injured list and subsequently designated for assignment.

=== San Francisco Giants ===
On November 5, 2019, Oaks was claimed off waivers by the San Francisco Giants. On January 16, 2020, Oaks was designated for assignment following the signing of Drew Smyly. He cleared waivers and was sent outright to the Triple-A Sacramento River Cats on January 24. Oaks did not play in a game in 2020 due to the cancellation of the minor league season because of the COVID-19 pandemic. On December 20, Oaks was released by the Giants organization.

In an interview on January 31, 2022, Oaks acknowledged that he had retired from professional baseball since his release from the Giants organization.
