= Joakim Soria =

Mexican baseball player (born 1984)

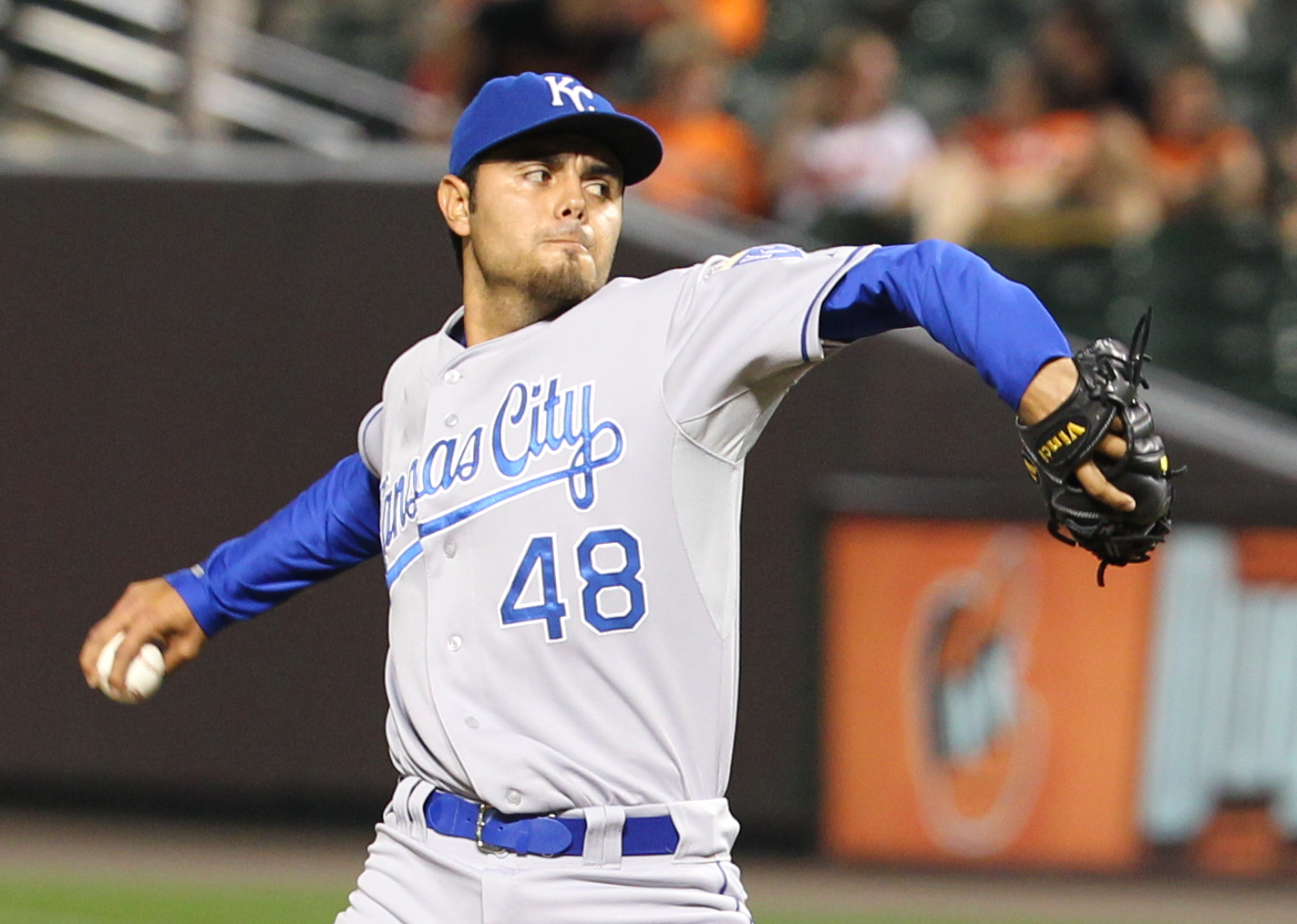
- Soria with the Kansas City Royals in 2011
- Pitcher
- Born: May 18, 1984 (age 42); Monclova, Coahuila, Mexico
- Batted: Right Threw: Right

MLB debut
- April 4, 2007, for the Kansas City Royals

Last MLB appearance
- September 15, 2021, for the Toronto Blue Jays

MLB statistics
- Win–loss record: 36–45
- Earned run average: 3.11
- Strikeouts: 831
- Saves: 229
- Stats at Baseball Reference

Teams
- Kansas City Royals (2007–2011); Texas Rangers (2013–2014); Detroit Tigers (2014–2015); Pittsburgh Pirates (2015); Kansas City Royals (2016–2017); Chicago White Sox (2018); Milwaukee Brewers (2018); Oakland Athletics (2019–2020); Arizona Diamondbacks (2021); Toronto Blue Jays (2021)

Career highlights and awards
- 2× All-Star (2008, 2010)
Medals
Men's baseball
Representing Mexico
Central American and Caribbean Games
Bronze medal – third place	2006 Cartagena	Team

Joakim Agustín Soria Ramos (born May 18, 1984) is a Mexican former professional baseball pitcher. He played in Major League Baseball (MLB) for the Kansas City Royals, Texas Rangers, Detroit Tigers, Pittsburgh Pirates, Chicago White Sox, Milwaukee Brewers, Oakland Athletics, Arizona Diamondbacks, and Toronto Blue Jays from 2007 to 2021.

Soria began his professional career in the Mexican League, before briefly playing in minor league baseball for the Los Angeles Dodgers and San Diego Padres organizations. The Royals selected Soria from the Padres in the Rule 5 draft after the 2006 season, and he debuted with the Royals in 2007. Soria is a two-time MLB All-Star.

== Career ==
=== Early career ===
Soria has played for his country's Diablos Rojos del México (in the Mexican Baseball League) and Yaquis de Obregón in the Winter League. He played for the Class-A Fort Wayne Wizards as well. On December 9, 2006, in the Mexican Winter League, Soria threw a perfect game against the Naranjeros de Hermosillo at the Estadio Tomás Oroz Gaytán.

=== Kansas City Royals ===
In 2006, Soria was drafted at the age of 22 by the Kansas City Royals in the Rule 5 draft out of the San Diego Padres organization in 2006. He debuted for the Royals in the 2007 season, and had a win–loss record of 2–3 with 17 saves and an earned run average (ERA) of 2.48.

Soria opened the 2008 season with 13 straight saves, breaking Al Hrabosky's club record of 11. He was scored on in just two of 35 outings. He went 16 1/3 innings before giving up a run and in one stretch retired 24 straight batters.

On May 17, 2008, Soria signed a three-year, $8.75 million extension to his contract with the Royals, following his impressive performance as the team's closer in the first quarter of the season.

Soria's fantastic start led to him being selected to play in the 2008 Major League Baseball All-Star Game. Soria was the Royals' lone representative in the All-Star Game. He was the first Royals closing pitcher to be named an All-Star since Mike MacDougal in 2003. He pitched 1 2/3 innings, striking out the Florida Marlins' Dan Uggla and New York Mets' David Wright.

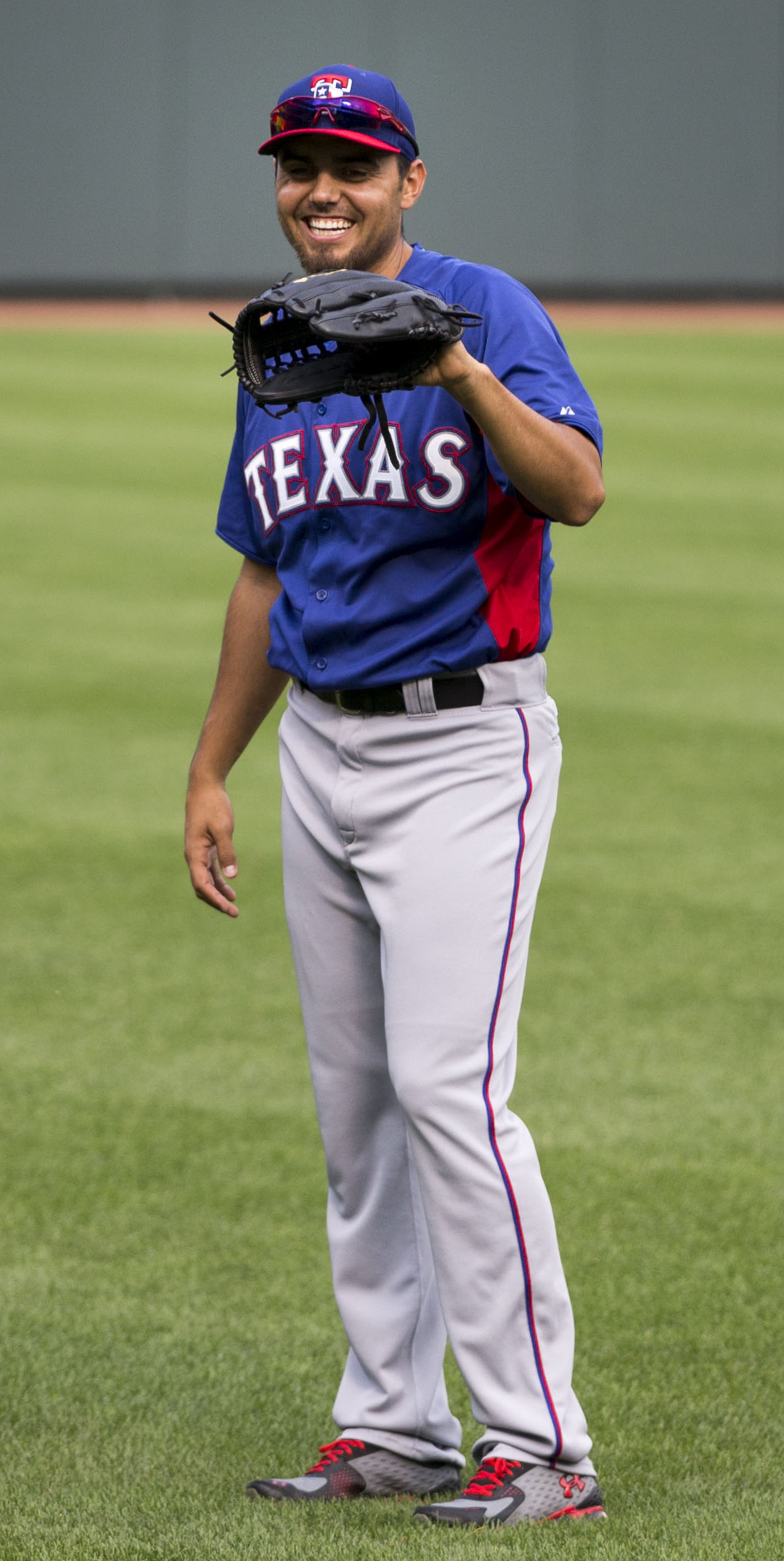
Soria pitching for the Texas Rangers

Soria had injuries but he finished the 2009 year strong with a 3–2 record with 30 saves out of 33 chances.

On May 26, 2010, Soria got his 100th save against the Texas Rangers. Soria was picked for the 2010 All-Star Game, the second of his career. He finished the season with a 1.78 ERA and 43 saves in 46 opportunities.

Soria struggled out of the gate in the 2011 season, blowing five of his first twelve save opportunities. After blowing saves on back to back days, Soria was replaced as closer by Aaron Crow on May 30. After a couple of good relief appearances in a non-closer role, Yost announced on June 6 that Soria had earned the position back.

On April 3, 2012, Soria underwent Tommy John surgery to repair a damaged ulnar collateral ligament in his right elbow, causing him to miss the entire 2012 season. The Royals declined his 2013 option on October 31, making him a free agent.

=== Texas Rangers ===
On December 4, 2012, Soria signed a two-year contract worth $8 million with the Texas Rangers with a club option for the 2015 season. He started the season on the 60-day disabled list as he was still recovering from surgery. He made his first appearance for Texas on July 7, 2013. After former closer Joe Nathan signed with the Detroit Tigers in the offseason, Soria was named the new Rangers closer for the 2014 season.

=== Detroit Tigers ===
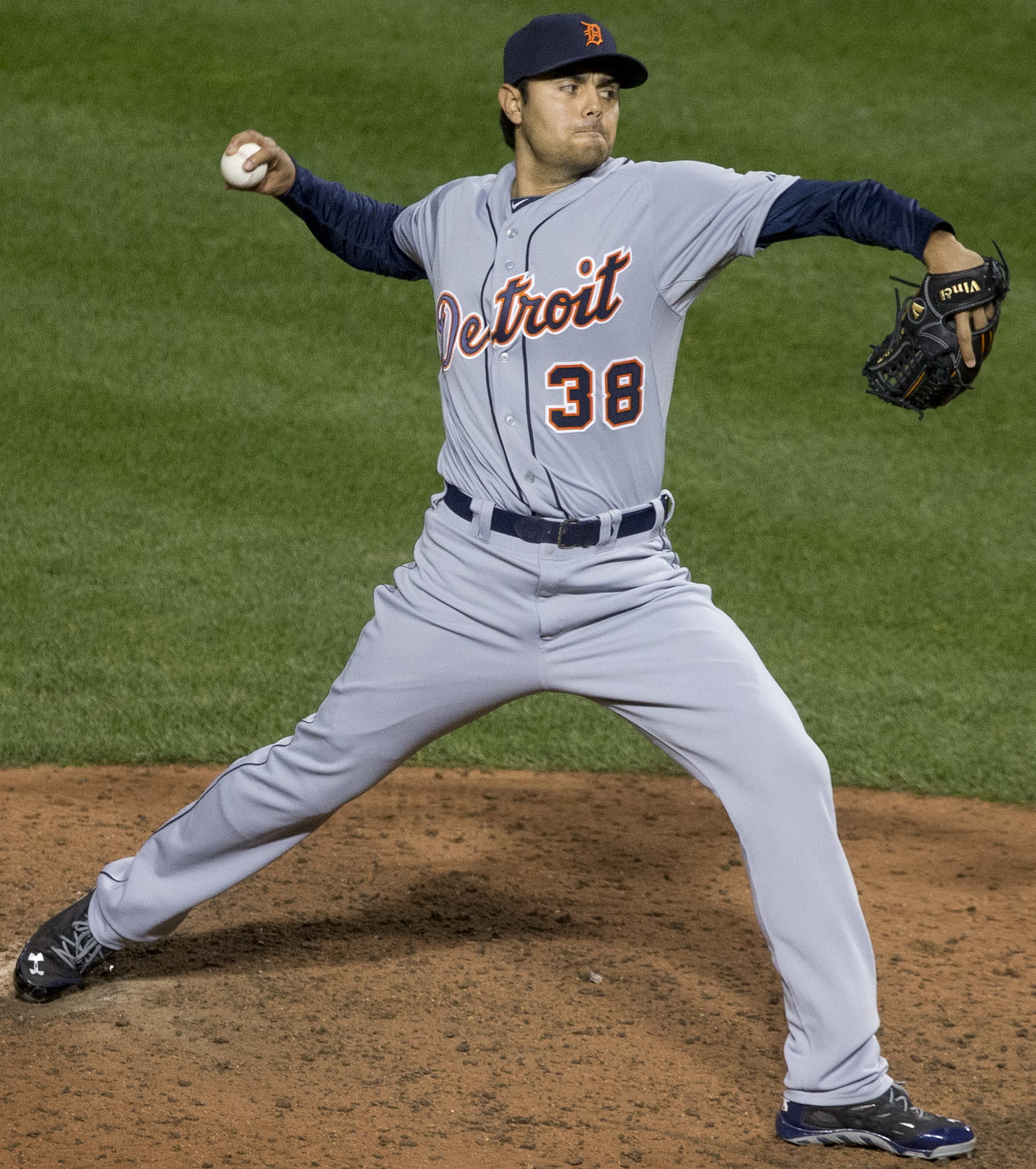
Soria pitching for the Detroit Tigers

On July 23, 2014, the Texas Rangers traded Soria to the Detroit Tigers in exchange for pitchers Jake Thompson and Corey Knebel. Soria recorded his 200th career save on July 22, 2015.

=== Pittsburgh Pirates ===
On July 30, 2015, the Tigers traded Soria to the Pittsburgh Pirates in exchange for JaCoby Jones.

=== Second stint with the Royals ===
On December 10, 2015, Soria signed a three-year, $25 million contract to return to the Royals.

=== Chicago White Sox ===
On January 4, 2018, Soria was traded to the Chicago White Sox in a three team trade that also sent Jake Peter and Scott Alexander to the Los Angeles Dodgers, Luis Avilán to the White Sox and Trevor Oaks and Erick Mejia to the Royals.

=== Milwaukee Brewers ===
On July 26, 2018, Soria was traded to the Milwaukee Brewers in exchange for Kodi Medeiros and Wilber Pérez. Soria declined his half of a mutual option for the 2019 season and became a free agent, on October 30, 2018.

=== Oakland Athletics ===
On December 21, 2018, Soria signed a two-year contract with the Oakland Athletics. On June 25, 2019, Soria pitched in his 674th major league game, passing Dennys Reyes for the most by a Mexican-born pitcher. In 2019 for the Athletics, Soria pitched to a 4.30 ERA over 69 innings pitched in 71 appearances, to go along with 79 strikeouts. In 2020 for Oakland, Soria made 22 appearances, pitching 22 1/3 innings with a 2.82 ERA and 24 strikeouts.

=== Arizona Diamondbacks ===
On February 6, 2021, Soria officially signed with the Arizona Diamondbacks on a one-year, $3.5 million contract.

=== Toronto Blue Jays ===
On July 30, 2021, Soria was traded to the Toronto Blue Jays in exchange for minor leaguers J.J. D'Orazio and Yaifer Perdomo. After the 2021 season, Soria announced his retirement.

== Pitch selection ==
Soria throws five pitches. He relies primarily on his fastball and cut fastball. Both pitches average about 90 miles per hour (140 km/h), with the fastball topping out near 94 miles per hour (151 km/h) and the cutter topping out around 93 miles per hour (150 km/h). He mixes in a slider in the low 80s, a slow curveball around 70 miles per hour (110 km/h), and an occasional changeup in the low- to mid-80s.

== Personal life ==
Soria and his wife, Karla, have three children. Soria is a Christian.

Soria is a supporter of the charity Water Mission.

Soria has been nicknamed The Mexicutioner, although in February 2011, he stated that he no longer wanted to be associated with that nickname due to violence in his home country.

== See also ==
- Rule 5 draft results
