= 2018 Cincinnati Reds season =

2018 Cincinnati Reds
- League: National League
- Division: Central
- Ballpark: Great American Ball Park
- City: Cincinnati, Ohio
- Record: 67–95 (.414)
- Divisional place: 5th
- Owners: Bob Castellini
- General managers: Dick Williams, Nick Krall
- Managers: Bryan Price (through April 18); Jim Riggleman (starting April 19)
- Television: Fox Sports Ohio (Thom Brennaman, Chris Welsh, George Grande, Jeff Brantley, Jim Day, Jeff Piecoro)
- Radio: WLW (700 AM); Reds Radio Network (Marty Brennaman, Jeff Brantley, Jim Day, Thom Brennaman, Doug Flynn, Chris Welsh)
- Stats: ESPN.com; Baseball Reference

The 2018 Cincinnati Reds season was the 149th season for the franchise in Major League Baseball, and their 16th at Great American Ball Park in Cincinnati.

== Offseason ==
=== Transactions ===
November 2, 2017	SS Zack Cozart elected free agency. Cozart signed a three-year, $38 million contract with the Los Angeles Angels on December 15, 2017.
December 27, 2017	Signed RHP Jared Hughes to a two-year, $4.5 million contract.
January 12, 2018	Signed OF Billy Hamilton to a one-year, $4.6 million contract, avoiding arbitration.
January 12, 2018	Signed RHP Anthony DeSclafani to a one-year, $860,000 contract, avoiding arbitration.
January 12, 2018	Signed RHP Michael Lorenzen to a one-year, $1.31 million contract, avoiding arbitration.
January 30, 2018	Signed RHP David Hernandez to a two-year, $5 million contract.
February 6, 2018	Signed 3B Eugenio Suárez to a one-year, $3.75 million contract, settling in arbitration.
February 17, 2018	Signed 2B Scooter Gennett to a one-year, $5.7 million contract, settling in arbitration.
March 16, 2018	Signed 3B Eugenio Suárez to a six-year, $66 million contract extension, including a club option for 2025.

== Standings ==
=== National League Central ===
NL Central
Team	W	L	Pct.	GB	Home	Road
Milwaukee Brewers	96	67	.589	—	51‍–‍30	45‍–‍37
Chicago Cubs	95	68	.583	1	51‍–‍31	44‍–‍37
St. Louis Cardinals	88	74	.543	7½	43‍–‍38	45‍–‍36
Pittsburgh Pirates	82	79	.509	13	44‍–‍36	38‍–‍43
Cincinnati Reds	67	95	.414	28½	37‍–‍44	30‍–‍51

=== National League Wildcard ===
Division leaders
Team	W	L	Pct.
Milwaukee Brewers	96	67	.589
Los Angeles Dodgers	92	71	.564
Atlanta Braves	90	72	.556

Wild Card teams (Top 2 teams qualify for postseason)
Team	W	L	Pct.	GB
Chicago Cubs	95	68	.583	+4
Colorado Rockies	91	72	.558	—
St. Louis Cardinals	88	74	.543	2½
Pittsburgh Pirates	82	79	.509	8
Arizona Diamondbacks	82	80	.506	8½
Washington Nationals	82	80	.506	8½
Philadelphia Phillies	80	82	.494	10½
New York Mets	77	85	.475	13½
San Francisco Giants	73	89	.451	17½
Cincinnati Reds	67	95	.414	23½
San Diego Padres	66	96	.407	24½
Miami Marlins	63	98	.391	27

=== Record vs. opponents ===
2018 National League record Source: MLB Standings Grid – 2018
Team	AZ	ATL	CHC	CIN	COL	LAD	MIA	MIL	NYM	PHI	PIT	SD	SF	STL	WSH	AL
Arizona	—	3–4	3–4	3–3	8–11	11–8	6–1	1–5	2–5	4–2	6–1	12–7	8–11	3–3	2–5	10–10
Atlanta	4–3	—	3–3	3–4	2–5	2–5	14–5	3–4	13–6	12–7	5–1	4–3	3–3	4–2	10–9	8–12
Chicago	4–3	3–3	—	11–8	3–3	4–3	5–2	11–9	6–1	4–2	10–9	5–2	3–3	9–10	4–3	13–7
Cincinnati	3–3	4–3	8–11	—	2–4	6–1	2–5	6–13	3–3	3–4	5–14	3–4	4–2	7–12	1–6	10–10
Colorado	11–8	5–2	3–3	4–2	—	7–13	2–4	2–5	6–1	5–2	3–3	11–8	12–7	2–5	5–2	13–7
Los Angeles	8–11	5–2	3–4	1–6	13–7	—	2–4	4–3	4–2	3–4	5–1	14–5	10–9	3–4	5–1	12–8
Miami	1–6	5–14	2–5	5–2	4–2	4–2	—	2–5	7–12	8–11	1–4	2–5	4–3	3–3	6–13	9–11
Milwaukee	5–1	4–3	9–11	13–6	5–2	3–4	5–2	—	4–3	3–3	7–12	4–2	6–1	11–8	4–2	13–7
New York	5–2	6–13	1–6	3–3	1–6	2–4	12–7	3–4	—	11–8	3–4	4–2	4–3	3–3	11–8	8–12
Philadelphia	2–4	7–12	2–4	4–3	2–5	4–3	11–8	3–3	8–11	—	6–1	3–3	4–3	4–3	8–11	12–8
Pittsburgh	1–6	1–5	9–10	14–5	3–3	1–5	4–1	12–7	4–3	1–6	—	3–4	4–3	8–11	2–5	15–5
San Diego	7–12	3–4	2–5	4–3	8–11	5–14	5–2	2–4	2–4	3–3	4–3	—	8–11	4–3	2–4	7–13
San Francisco	11–8	3–3	3–3	2–4	7–12	9–10	3–4	1–6	3–4	3–4	3–4	11–8	—	2–5	4–2	8–12
St. Louis	3–3	2–4	10–9	12–7	5–2	4–3	3–3	8–11	3–3	3–4	11–8	3–4	5–2	—	5–2	11–9
Washington	5–2	9–10	3–4	6–1	2–5	1–5	13–6	2–4	8–11	11–8	5–2	4–2	2–4	2–5	—	9–11

The October 1 tiebreaker games were regular-season games that are included here.

== Regular Season Summary ==
=== Opening Day starting lineup ===
Position	Name
LF	Jesse Winker
3B	Eugenio Suárez
1B	Joey Votto
2B	Scooter Gennett
RF	Scott Schebler
C	Tucker Barnhart
SS	José Peraza
P	Homer Bailey
CF	Billy Hamilton

=== April ===
- April 19: The Reds fired manager Bryan Price after a 3–15 start to the season, along with pitching coach Mack Jenkins. Price managed in Cincinnati for five seasons and finished with a record of 279 wins and 387 losses. Bench coach Jim Riggleman was named interim manager, with Double-A Pensacola pitching coach Danny Darwin joining the coaching staff. Pat Kelly, who was the manager of Triple-A Louisville, will be the bench coach.
- April 23 – April 29: Joey Votto was named N.L. Player of the Week as he slashed .360/.543/.880 with 7 runs scored, 4 HR and 8 RBI, while drawing 9 walks.

=== May ===
- May 7 – May 13: Scooter Gennett was named N.L. Player of the Week with a slash line of .591/.591/1.227, 4 HR, 10 RBI, 7 runs and 2 doubles.
- May 8: The Reds acquired starting pitcher Matt Harvey from the New York Mets in exchange for catcher Devin Mesoraco.
- May 10 – May 13: The Reds swept the Dodgers in a four-game series for the first time since August 1976.
- May 21 – May 27: Scooter Gennett was named N.L. Player of the Week for the second time in the 2018 season. Gennett batted .500 (12–for-24) with 6 runs scored, 2 doubles, 3 HR and 10 RBI over six games played. Among his NL counterparts during the period, Scooter finished first in hits, slugging percentage (.958) and total bases (23); tied for first in home runs, extra–base hits (5) and RBI; second in batting average; tied for third in runs scored; and seventh in on–base percentage (.519).

=== June ===
- June 2: Scooter Gennett was named N.L. Player of the Month for the month of May. Gennett batted .398 (37–for–93) with 16 runs scored, 6 doubles, 8 HR and 24 RBI over 26 games played.
- June 21–24: The Reds swept the Cubs in a four-game series for the first time since April 1983, outscoring them 31–13 in the four games. In game 3, Anthony DeSclafani hit a grand slam, the first pitcher to do this for the Reds since Bob Purkey in 1959. In the 4th game, the Reds trailed 6–1, but managed to come back by scoring 7 runs in the 7th inning.
- June 30: Michael Lorenzen became the second Reds pitcher to hit a grand slam this season following Anthony DeSclafani's grand slam a week earlier. The home run was Lorenzen's third in as many at-bats making him the first pitcher to homer in three-straight at-bats since Mike Hampton in 2001.

=== July ===
- July 1: José Peraza hit a grand slam, allowing the Reds to match their record of 9 set in 2002.
- July 8: Joey Votto, Scooter Gennett and Eugenio Suárez were named reserves on the National League squad for the 2018 MLB All-Star Game in Washington, D.C. This is Votto's sixth All-Star selection and the first for both Gennett and Suarez.
- July 10: The Reds rallied from a four run deficit and scored seven runs in the 9th inning to defeat the Cleveland Indians, 7–4. The four-run comeback was the Reds' first since June 30, 2006 when Adam Dunn hit a walk-off grand slam, also against the Indians.
- July 17: Scooter Gennett and Joey Votto both hit home runs in a 6–8 loss to the American League in the All-Star game. Gennett's home run was the first for a Red in an All-Star game since July 13, 1982 when Dave Concepción hit one.
- July 23: The Reds were no-hit for seven innings by Cardinals rookie pitcher Daniel Poncedeleon. Poncedelon was taken out of the game in the 8th inning where Phillip Ervin broke up the no-hitter with a single off reliever Jordan Hicks. Eugenio Suárez tied the game in the 9th with a solo home run and Dilson Herrera hit a walk-off single later in the inning to give the Reds the 2–1 win.
- July 30: The Reds acquired pitchers Lucas Sims and Matt Wisler along with outfielder Preston Tucker from the Atlanta Braves in exchange for outfielder Adam Duvall.

=== August ===
- August 10: Joey Votto collected his 1,700th career hit with a single in the sixth-inning. Votto is the ninth player in franchise history to reach that level.
- August 29: Eugenio Suárez hit his 30th home run of the season, becoming the fourth player in Reds history to hit that many home runs while primarily playing third base. He joins Tony Pérez, Todd Frazier and Deron Johnson. Pitcher Michael Lorenzen also had a pinch-hit three-run home run, his fourth home run and his third against the Brewers this season.

=== September ===
- September 8: Scott Schebler hit the 10th grand slam by a Reds player this season, setting a club record.
- September 9: Joey Votto hit his second grand slam and the 11th overall for the Reds this season, one shy of the N.L. record. The 1997 Braves and 2000 Cardinals share the N.L. record of 12. Nine different Reds players have hit grand slams this season, Scott Schebler, Adam Duvall (2), Scooter Gennett, Eugenio Suárez, Joey Votto (2), Jesse Winker, starting pitcher Anthony DeSclafani, reliever Michael Lorenzen, and José Peraza. According to STATS, the Reds are only the second team to have nine different players hit a grand slam in a season, the 2000 Cardinals had 10 players connect on a grand slam.
- September 12: Scooter Gennett went 1–4 to bring his season average against the Dodgers to .654 with 17 hits, 2 HR and 10 RBI.

== Game log ==
2018 regular season game log: 67–95 (Home: 37–44; Away: 30–51)
March/April: 7–22 (Home:3–10; Away: 4–12)

#	Date	Opponent	Score	Win	Loss	Save	Attendance	Record	Box/Streak
—	March 29	Nationals	**Postponed (rain)** (Makeup date: March 30)						
1	March 30	Nationals	0–2	Scherzer (1–0)	**Bailey** (0–1)	Doolittle (1)	43,878	0–1	L1
2	March 31	Nationals	7–13	Strasburg (1–0)	**Castillo** (0–1)	—	27,341	0–2	L2
3	April 1	Nationals	5–6	González (1–0)	**Romano** (0–1)	Doolittle (2)	10,335	0–3	L3
4	April 2	Cubs	1–0	**Mahle** (1–0)	Chatwood (0–1)	**Iglesias** (1)	18,963	1–3	W1
—	April 3	Cubs	**Postponed (rain)** (Makeup date: May 19)						
5	April 5	@ Pirates	2–5	Brault (2–0)	**Bailey** (0–2)	Rivero (3)	9,227	1–4	L1
6	April 6	@ Pirates	3–14	Williams (2–0)	**Castillo** (0–2)	—	11,115	1–5	L2
7	April 7	@ Pirates	7–4	**Peralta** (1–0)	Kontos (0–1)	**Iglesias** (2)	14,336	2–5	W1
8	April 8	@ Pirates	0–5	Taillon (2–0)	**Mahle** (1–1)	—	11,261	2–6	L1
9	April 9	@ Phillies	5–6	García (1–1)	**Quackenbush** (0–1)	Neris (1)	18,127	2–7	L2
10	April 10	@ Phillies	1–6	Nola (1–0)	**Hughes** (0–1)	—	20,895	2–8	L3
11	April 11	@ Phillies	3–4 (12)	Ríos (1–0)	**Brice** (0–1)	—	19,099	2–9	L4
12	April 12	Cardinals	4–13	Wacha (2–1)	**Brice** (0–2)	Mayers (1)	11,128	2–10	L5
13	April 13	Cardinals	3–5	Weaver (2–0)	**Mahle** (1–2)	Norris (2)	19,561	2–11	L6
14	April 14	Cardinals	1–6	Mikolas (2–0)	**Finnegan** (0–1)	—	19,213	2–12	L7
15	April 15	Cardinals	2–3	Martinez (2–1)	**Bailey** (0–3)	Norris (3)	15,557	2–13	L8
16	April 16	@ Brewers	10–4	**Castillo** (1–2)	Suter (1–2)	—	28,677	3–13	W1
17	April 17	@ Brewers	0–2	Jennings (2–0)	**Romano** (0–2)	Hader (2)	31,345	3–14	L1
18	April 18	@ Brewers	0–2	Davies (1–2)	**Mahle** (1–3)	Barnes (2)	37,343	3–15	L2
19	April 20	@ Cardinals	2–4	Wacha (3–1)	**Finnegan** (0–2)	Norris (5)	43,303	3–16	L3
20	April 21	@ Cardinals	3–4	Hicks (1–0)	**Hughes** (0–2)	—	42,382	3–17	L4
21	April 22	@ Cardinals	2–9	Mikolas (3–0)	**Castillo** (1–3)	—	44,430	3–18	L5
22	April 23	Braves	10–4	**Romano** (1–2)	Freeman (0–1)	**Iglesias** (3)	9,463	4–18	W1
23	April 24	Braves	9–7 (12)	**Hughes** (1–2)	Fried (0–1)	—	14,139	5–18	W2
24	April 25	Braves	3–4	Winkler (1–0)	**Shackelford** (0–1)	Minter (1)	13,113	5–19	L1
25	April 26	Braves	4–7	Freeman (1–1)	**Peralta** (1–1)	Vizcaíno (2)	11,919	5–20	L2
26	April 27	@ Twins	15–9	**Hernandez** (1–0)	Duffey (0–1)	—	25,002	6–20	W1
27	April 28	@ Twins	1–3	Odorizzi (2–2)	**Romano** (1–3)	Rodney (3)	27,115	6–21	L1
28	April 29	@ Twins	8–2	**Mahle** (2–3)	Berríos (2–3)	—	25,677	7–21	W1
29	April 30	Brewers	5–6	Woodruff (1–0)	**Peralta** (1–2)	Hader (4)	9,536	7–22	L1

May: 13–15 (Home: 6–9; Away: 7–6)

#	Date	Opponent	Score	Win	Loss	Save	Attendance	Record	Box/Streak
30	May 1	Brewers	6–7	Anderson (3–2)	**Bailey** (0–4)	Jeffress (1)	12,933	7–23	L2
31	May 2	Brewers	1–3	Miley (1–0)	**Castillo** (1–4)	Jeffress (2)	10,346	7–24	L3
32	May 4	Marlins	4–1	**Romano** (2–3)	Chen (1–1)	**Iglesias** (4)	22,610	8–24	W1
33	May 5	Marlins	0–6	Smith (2–3)	**Mahle** (2–4)	—	19,609	8–25	L1
34	May 6	Marlins	5–8	Straily (1–0)	**Finnegan** (0–3)	Ziegler (4)	19,800	8–26	L2
35	May 7	Mets	6–7	Gsellman (4–0)	**Bailey** (0–5)	Familia (10)	15,187	8–27	L3
36	May 8	Mets	7–2	**Castillo** (2–4)	Vargas (0–3)	—	14,804	9–27	W1
37	May 9	Mets	2–1 (10)	**Iglesias** (1–0)	Ramos (1–2)	—	16,452	10–27	W2
38	May 10	@ Dodgers	4–1	**Mahle** (3–4)	Buehler (2–1)	**Iglesias** (5)	47,383	11–27	W3
39	May 11	@ Dodgers	6–2	**Brice** (1–2)	Maeda (2–3)	**Iglesias** (6)	46,979	12–27	W4
40	May 12	@ Dodgers	5–3	**Bailey** (1–5)	Chargois (1–1)	**Hughes** (1)	49,911	13–27	W5
41	May 13	@ Dodgers	5–3	**Castillo** (3–4)	Hill (1–2)	**Iglesias** (7)	44,787	14–27	W6
42	May 14	@ Giants	7–10	Stratton (4–3)	**Romano** (2–4)		36,156	14–28	L1
43	May 15	@ Giants	3–5	Johnson (2–1)	**Mahle** (3–5)	Strickland (9)	37,809	14–29	L2
44	May 16	@ Giants	6–3	**Hughes** (2–2)	Suarez (1–3)	**Iglesias** (8)	38,662	15–29	W1
45	May 18	Cubs	1–8	Lester (4–1)	**Bailey** (1–6)	—	22,060	15–30	L1
46	May 19 (1)	Cubs	5–4 (11)	**Floro** (1–0)	Wilson (1–1)	—	19,046	16–30	W1
47	May 19 (2)	Cubs	0–10	Quintana (5–3)	**Romano** (2–5)	—	26,082	16–31	L1
48	May 20	Cubs	1–6	Darvish (1–3)	**Mahle** (3–6)	—	26,988	16–32	L2
49	May 22	Pirates	7–2	**Harvey** (1–2)	Taillon (2–4)	—	16,144	17–32	W1
50	May 23	Pirates	4–5 (12)	Brault (4–1)	**Floro** (1–1)	Crick (1)	18,659	17–33	L1
51	May 24	Pirates	5–4	**Castillo** (4–4)	Nova (2–5)	**Hughes** (2)	14,853	18–33	W1
52	May 25	@ Rockies	4–5	Gray (5–6)	**Romano** (2–6)	Davis (18)	33,193	18–34	L1
53	May 26	@ Rockies	6–5	**Lorenzen** (1–0)	Rusin (0–1)	**Hughes** (3)	42,844	19–34	W1
54	May 27	@ Rockies	2–8	Marquez (4–5)	**Harvey** (1–3)	—	36,387	19–35	L1
55	May 28	@ Diamondbacks	5–12	Koch (3–3)	**Bailey** (1–7)	—	29,924	19–36	L2
56	May 29	@ Diamondbacks	2–5	Godley (5–4)	**Castillo** (4–5)	Boxberger (13)	20,046	19–37	L3
57	May 30	@ Diamondbacks	7–4	**Romano** (3–6)	Corbin (5–2)	**Iglesias** (9)	18,340	20–37	W1

June: 15–11 (Home: 9–6; Away: 6–5)

#	Date	Opponent	Score	Win	Loss	Save	Attendance	Record	Box/Streak
58	June 1	@ Padres	7–2	**Mahle** (4–6)	Lockett (0–1)	**Lorenzen** (1)	25,729	21–37	W2
59	June 2	@ Padres	2–8	Lauer (2–3)	**Harvey** (1–4)	—	31,710	21–38	L1
60	June 3	@ Padres	3–6	Ross (5–3)	**Castillo** (4–6)	Yates (1)	25,377	21–39	L2
61	June 5	Rockies	6–9	Freeland (6–5)	**DeSclafani** (0–1)	Davis (19)	21,944	21–40	L3
62	June 6	Rockies	3–6	Gray (6–6)	**Romano** (3–7)	Davis (20)	19,762	21–41	L4
63	June 7	Rockies	7–5 (13)	**Floro** (2–1)	Rusin (0–2)	—	15,957	22–41	W1
64	June 8	Cardinals	6–7 (10)	Norris (3–1)	**Iglesias** (1–1)	Brebbia (2)	26,144	22–42	L1
65	June 9	Cardinals	4–6	Wacha (8–1)	**Castillo** (4–7)	Hicks (1)	34,469	22–43	L2
66	June 10	Cardinals	6–3	**DeSclafani** (1–1)	Martinez (3–3)	**Hughes** (4)	19,344	23–43	W1
67	June 12	@ Royals	5–1 (10)	**Hernandez** (2–0)	McCarthy (4–3)	—	20,476	24–43	W2
68	June 13	@ Royals	7–0	**Mahle** (5–6)	Hammel (2–7)	—	24,899	25–43	W3
69	June 15	@ Pirates	2–3	Kuhl (5–4)	**Harvey** (1–5)	Vázquez (13)	23,007	25–44	L1
70	June 16	@ Pirates	2–6	Nova (4–5)	**Castillo** (4–8)	—	27,479	25–45	L2
71	June 17	@ Pirates	8–6	**DeSclafani** (2–1)	Musgrove (2–2)	**Iglesias** (10)	23,042	26–45	W1
72	June 19	Tigers	9–5	**Romano** (4–7)	Boyd (4–5)	—	31,085	27–45	W2
73	June 20	Tigers	5–3	**Mahle** (6–6)	Fulmer (3–6)	**Iglesias** (11)	19,177	28–45	W3
74	June 21	Cubs	6–2	**Harvey** (2–5)	Hendricks (5–7)	**Hughes** (5)	19,581	29–45	W4
75	June 22	Cubs	6–3	**Castillo** (5–8)	Quintana (6–6)	**Iglesias** (12)	25,885	30–45	W5
76	June 23	Cubs	11–2	**DeSclafani** (3–1)	Farrell (2–3)	—	36,818	31–45	W6
77	June 24	Cubs	8–6	**Stephens** (1–0)	Strop (3–1)	**Iglesias** (13)	30,508	32–45	W7
78	June 25	@ Braves	4–5 (11)	Jackson (1–0)	**Floro** (2–2)	—	27,851	32–46	L1
79	June 26	@ Braves	5–3	**Harvey** (3–5)	Sánchez (3–2)	**Iglesias** (14)	28,356	33–46	W1
80	June 27	@ Braves	6–5	**Stephens** (2–0)	Freeman (2–4)	**Iglesias** (15)	30,207	34–46	W2
81	June 28	Brewers	4–6	Guerra (4–5)	**Garrett** (0–1)	Knebel (8)	20,347	34–47	L1
82	June 29	Brewers	2–8	Anderson (6–6)	**Romano** (4–8)	—	26,130	34–48	L2
83	June 30	Brewers	12–3	**Hernandez** (3–0)	Zagurski (0–1)	—	24,640	35–48	W1

July: 13–11 (Home: 8–6; Away: 5–5)

#	Date	Opponent	Score	Win	Loss	Save	Attendance	Record	Box/Streak
84	July 1	Brewers	8–2	**Harvey** (4–5)	Peralta (1–3)	—	18,483	36–48	W2
85	July 2	White Sox	5–3	**Floro** (3–2)	Volstad (1–5)	**Iglesias** (16)	16,727	37–48	W3
86	July 3	White Sox	8–12 (12)	Santiago (3–3)	**Stephens** (2–1)	—	22,742	37–49	L1
87	July 4	White Sox	7–4	**Romano** (5–8)	Covey (3–4)	**Hughes** (6)	24,442	38–49	W1
88	July 6	@ Cubs	3–2	**Mahle** (7–6)	Montgomery (3–3)	**Iglesias** (17)	41,434	39–49	W2
89	July 7	@ Cubs	7–8	Rosario (4–0)	**Hughes** (2–3)	Morrow (20)	41,538	39–50	L1
90	July 8	@ Cubs	5–6 (10)	Farrell (3–3)	**Stephens** (2–2)	—	38,655	39–51	L2
91	July 9	@ Indians	7–5	**DeSclafani** (4–1)	Clevinger (7–4)	**Iglesias** (18)	22,561	40–51	W1
92	July 10	@ Indians	7–4	**Crockett** (1–0)	Allen (2–4)	**Iglesias** (19)	21,908	41–51	W2
93	July 11	@ Indians	4–19	Carrasco (10–5)	**Mahle** (7–7)	Plutko (1)	22,215	41–52	L1
94	July 13	@ Cardinals	9–1	**Harvey** (5–5)	Martinez (6–5)	—	45,891	42–52	W1
95	July 14	@ Cardinals	8–2	**Brice** (2–2)	Hicks (3–2)	—	44,668	43–52	W2
96	July 15	@ Cardinals	4–6	Gant (3–3)	**DeSclafani** (4–2)	Hicks (2)	45,808	43–53	L1
**2018 Major League Baseball All-Star Game: Washington, DC at Nationals Park**
97	July 20	Pirates	1–12	Taillon (7–7)	**Mahle** (7–8)	—	20,726	43–54	L2
98	July 21	Pirates	2–6	Kingham (5–4)	**DeSclafani** (4–3)	—	23,244	43–55	L3
99	July 22	Pirates	2–9	Nova (6–6)	**Harvey** (5–6)	—	23,615	43–56	L4
100	July 23	Cardinals	2–1	**Hughes** (3–3)	Norris (3–3)	—	17,518	44–56	W1
101	July 24	Cardinals	2–4 (11)	Tuivailala(3–3)	**Garrett** (0–2)	Norris (19)	18,379	44–57	L1
102	July 25	Cardinals	7–3	**Romano** (6–8)	Flaherty (4–5)	—	20,940	45–57	W1
103	July 26	Phillies	4–9	Suárez (1–0)	**Lorenzen** (1–1)	—	17,031	45–58	L1
104	July 27	Phillies	6–4	**Hernandez** (4–0)	Pivetta (6–9)	**Iglesias** (20)	24,776	46–58	W1
105	July 28	Phillies	6–2	**Peralta** (2–2)	Hunter (2–1)	**Hughes** (7)	35,249	47–58	W2
106	July 29	Phillies	4–0	**Castillo** (6–8)	Eflin (7–3)	**Iglesias** (21)	21,649	48–58	W3
107	July 31	@ Tigers	1–2	Boyd (6–9)	**Bailey** (1–8)	Greene (22)	24,929	48–59	L1

August: 9–19 (Home: 6–6; Away: 3–13)

#	Date	Opponent	Score	Win	Loss	Save	Attendance	Record	Box/Streak
108	August 1	@ Tigers	4–7	VerHagen (2–2)	**Romano** (6–9)	Greene (23)	24,952	48–60	L2
109	August 2	@ Nationals	4–10	Scherzer (15–5)	**Mahle** (7–9)	—	28,845	48–61	L3
—	August 3	@ Nationals	**Postponed (rain)** (Makeup date: August 4)						
110	August 4 (1)	@ Nationals	7–1	**DeSclafani** (5–3)	González (6–8)	—	32,687	49–61	W1
111	August 4 (2)	@ Nationals	2–6	Hellickson (5–2)	**Harvey** (5–7)	—	36,149	49–62	L1
112	August 5	@ Nationals	1–2	Roark (6–12)	**Castillo** (6–9)	Herrera (17)	33,486	49–63	L2
113	August 6	@ Mets	4–6	Syndergaard (7–2)	**Bailey** (1–9)	Blevins (1)	21,644	49–64	L3
114	August 7	@ Mets	6–1	**Romano** (7–9)	Vargas (2–8)	—	22,207	50–64	W1
115	August 8	@ Mets	0–8	deGrom (6–7)	**Stephenson** (0–1)	—	24,287	50–65	L1
116	August 10	Diamondbacks	3–0	**DeSclafani** (6–3)	Buchholz (5–2)	**Iglesias** (22)	19,089	51–65	W1
117	August 11	Diamondbacks	6–3	**Garrett** (1–2)	Bradley (3–4)	**Iglesias** (23)	29,348	52–65	W2
118	August 12	Diamondbacks	2–9	Godley (13–6)	**Castillo** (6–10)	—	17,909	52–66	L1
119	August 13	Indians	3–10	Clevenger (8–7)	**Bailey** (1–10)	—	20,607	52–67	L2
120	August 14	Indians	1–8	Kluber (15–6)	**Romano** (7–10)	—	19,034	52–68	L3
121	August 15	Indians	3–4	Otero (2–1)	**Reed** (0–1)	Hand (28)	17,275	52–69	L4
122	August 17	Giants	2–1 (11)	**Hernandez** (5–0)	Black (2–2)	—	19,540	53–69	W1
123	August 18	Giants	7–1	**Harvey** (6–7)	Bumgarner (4–5)	–	23,878	54–69	W2
124	August 19	Giants	11–4	**Castillo** (7–10)	Suarez (4–9)	–	22,756	55–69	W3
125	August 20	@ Brewers	2–5	Anderson (8–7)	**Bailey** (1–11)	Jeffress (5)	27,590	55–70	L1
126	August 21	@ Brewers	9–7	**Iglesias** (2–1)	Jennings (4–5)	—	29,467	56–70	W1
127	August 22	@ Brewers	0–4	Peralta (6–4)	**Stephenson** (0–2)	Jeffress (6)	33,058	56–71	L1
128	August 23	@ Cubs	1–7	Hamels (9–9)	**DeSclafani** (6–4)	—	41,130	56–72	L2
129	August 24	@ Cubs	2–3 (10)	Chavez (4–2)	**Iglesias** (2–2)	—	37,760	56–73	L3
130	August 25	@ Cubs	6–10	Quintana (11–9)	**Castillo** (7–11)	—	41,205	56–74	L4
131	August 26	@ Cubs	0–9	Hendricks (10–10)	**Bailey** (1–12)	—	40,331	56–75	L5
132	August 28	Brewers	9–7	**DeSclafani** (7–4)	Guerra (6–9)	**Iglesias** (24)	13,242	57–75	W1
133	August 29	Brewers	12–13 (10)	Jeffress (7–1)	**Iglesias** (2–3)	—	11,777	57–76	L1
134	August 30	Brewers	1–2	Soria (1–0)	**Brice** (2–3)	Hader (11)	13,403	57–77	L2
135	August 31	@ Cardinals	5–12	Gomber (5–0)	**Bailey** (1–13)	—	42,365	57–78	L3

September: 9–15 (Home: 4–6; Away: 5–9)

#	Date	Opponent	Score	Win	Loss	Save	Attendance	Record	Box/Streak
136	September 1	@ Cardinals	4–0	**Castillo** (8–11)	Poncedeleon (0–1)	—	46,368	58–78	W1
137	September 2	@ Cardinals	6–4 (10)	**Lorenzen** (2–1)	Norris (3–4)	**Iglesias** (25)	45,743	59–78	W2
138	September 3	@ Pirates	1–5	Williams (12–9)	**Harvey** (6–8)	—	13,843	59–79	L1
139	September 4	@ Pirates	3–7	Musgrove (6–8)	**Reed** (0–2)	—	8,855	59–80	L2
140	September 5	@ Pirates	2–3	Taillon (12–9)	**Bailey** (1–14)	Vázquez (30)	9,560	59–81	L3
141	September 6	Padres	2–6	J. Castillo (2–2)	**L. Castillo** (8–12)	—	14,303	59–82	L4
142	September 7	Padres	12–6	**Lorenzen** (3–1)	Strahm (3–4)	—	14,854	60–82	W1
143	September 8	Padres	7–2 (7)	**Harvey** (7–8)	Erlin (3–6)	—	20,977	61–82	W2
144	September 9	Padres	6–7	Stammen (7–2)	**Iglesias** (2–4)	Yates (7)	18,424	61–83	L1
145	September 10	Dodgers	10–6	**Hughes** (4–3)	Wood (8–7)	—	12,161	62–83	W1
146	September 11	Dodgers	3–1	**Castillo** (9–12)	Ryu (4–3)	**Iglesias** (26)	14,964	63–83	W2
147	September 12	Dodgers	1–8	Ferguson (6–2)	**DeSclafani** (7–5)	–	15,633	63–84	L1
148	September 14	@ Cubs	2–3	Maples (1–0)	**Hernandez** (5–1)	De La Rosa (1)	36,468	63–85	L2
149	September 15	@ Cubs	0–1	Lester (16–6)	**Romano** (7–11)	Cishek (4)	41,196	63–86	L3
150	September 16	@ Cubs	2–1	**Castillo** (10–12)	Quintana (13–10)	**Iglesias** (27)	41,314	64–86	W1
151	September 17	@ Brewers	0–8	Miley (5–2)	**DeSclafani** (7–6)	Woodruff (1)	32,145	64–87	L1
152	September 18	@ Brewers	3–1	**Romano** (8–11)	Anderson (9–8)	**Iglesias** (28)	30,366	65–87	W1
153	September 19	@ Brewers	0–7	González (9–11)	**Harvey** (7–9)	—	33,443	65–88	L1
154	September 20	@ Marlins	4–2	**Reed** (1–2)	Brigham (0–3)	**Iglesias** (29)	9,863	66–88	W1
155	September 21	@ Marlins	0–1 (10)	Barraclough (1–6)	**Hernandez** (5–2)	—	11,471	66–89	L1
156	September 22	@ Marlins	1–5	Ureña (8–12)	**DeSclafani** (7–7)	Steckenrider (5)	12,559	66–90	L2
157	September 23	@ Marlins	0–6	Richards (4–9)	**Lorenzen** (3–2)	—	13,595	66–91	L3
158	September 25	Royals	3–4	McCarthy (5–4)	**Iglesias** (2–5)	Peralta (14)	13,172	66–92	L4
159	September 26	Royals	1–6	Fillmyer (4–2)	**Reed** (1–3)	—	12,549	66–93	L5
160	September 28	Pirates	4–8	Brault (6–3)	**DeSclafani** (7–8)	—	19,689	66–94	L6
161	September 29	Pirates	3–0	**Lorenzen** (4–2)	Taillon (14–10)	**Iglesias** (30)	42,630	67–94	W1
162	September 30	Pirates	5–6 (10)	Feliz (1–2)	**Stephens** (2–3)	Vázquez (37)	25,091	67–95	L1

Legend: = Win = Loss = Postponement
Bold = Reds team member

== Player stats ==
=== Batting ===
Note: G = Games played; AB = At bats; R = Runs; H = Hits; 2B = Doubles; 3B = Triples; HR = Home runs; RBI = Runs batted in; SB = Stolen bases; BB = Walks; AVG = Batting average; SLG = Slugging average

Player	G	AB	R	H	2B	3B	HR	RBI	SB	BB	AVG	SLG
José Peraza	157	632	85	182	31	4	14	58	23	29	.288	.416
Scooter Gennett	154	584	86	181	30	3	23	92	4	42	.310	.490
Eugenio Suárez	143	527	79	149	22	2	34	104	1	64	.283	.526
Billy Hamilton	153	504	74	119	16	9	4	29	34	46	.236	.327
Joey Votto	145	503	67	143	28	2	12	67	2	108	.284	.419
Tucker Barnhart	138	460	50	114	21	3	10	46	0	54	.248	.372
Scott Schebler	107	380	55	97	19	0	17	49	4	39	.255	.439
Adam Duvall	105	331	40	68	19	0	15	61	2	34	.205	.399
Jesse Winker	89	281	38	84	16	0	7	43	0	49	.299	.431
Phillip Ervin	78	218	27	55	10	1	7	31	6	20	.252	.404
Curt Casali	52	140	15	41	10	0	4	16	0	12	.293	.450
Alex Blandino	69	128	14	30	4	0	1	8	0	13	.234	.289
Mason Williams	51	123	10	36	5	1	2	6	1	7	.293	.398
Brandon Dixon	74	118	14	21	6	0	5	10	0	6	.178	.356
Dilson Herrera	53	87	11	16	5	0	5	11	0	8	.184	.414
Devin Mesoraco	18	41	1	9	2	0	1	3	0	2	.220	.341
Preston Tucker	17	37	4	7	1	0	2	5	0	4	.189	.378
Cliff Pennington	16	29	1	4	0	0	0	0	0	5	.138	.138
Tony Cruz	9	26	2	4	1	0	1	2	0	0	.154	.308
Phil Gosselin	20	24	5	3	0	0	1	2	0	4	.125	.250
Gabriel Guerrero	14	18	1	3	0	0	1	1	0	0	.167	.333
Blake Trahan	11	14	2	3	0	0	0	0	0	0	.214	.214
Rosell Herrera	11	13	0	2	0	0	0	0	0	0	.154	.154
Tim Federowicz	5	6	1	2	1	0	1	2	0	1	.333	1.000
Aristides Aquino	1	1	0	0	0	0	0	0	0	0	.000	.000
Pitcher totals	162	307	14	31	4	0	5	19	0	12	.101	.163
Team totals	162	5532	696	1404	251	25	172	665	77	559	.254	.401

=== Pitching ===
Note: W = Wins; L = Losses; ERA = Earned run average; G = Games pitched; GS = Games started; SV = Saves; IP = Innings pitched; H = Hits allowed; R = Runs allowed; ER = Earned runs allowed; BB = Walks allowed; SO = Strikeouts

Player	W	L	ERA	G	GS	SV	IP	H	R	ER	BB	SO
Luis Castillo	10	12	4.30	31	31	0	169.2	158	89	81	49	165
Sal Romano	8	11	5.31	39	25	0	145.2	155	92	86	53	105
Matt Harvey	7	7	4.50	24	24	0	128.0	132	66	64	28	111
Anthony DeSclafani	7	8	4.93	21	21	0	115.0	118	68	63	30	108
Tyler Mahle	7	9	4.98	23	23	0	112.0	125	68	62	53	110
Homer Bailey	1	14	6.09	20	20	0	106.1	141	82	72	33	75
Michael Lorenzen	4	2	3.11	45	3	1	81.0	78	32	28	34	54
Jared Hughes	4	3	1.94	72	0	7	78.2	57	17	17	23	59
Raisel Iglesias	2	5	2.38	66	0	30	72.0	52	22	19	25	80
David Hernandez	5	2	2.53	57	0	0	64.0	46	20	18	17	65
Amir Garrett	1	2	4.29	66	0	0	63.0	56	30	30	25	71
Wandy Peralta	2	2	5.36	59	0	0	45.1	58	32	27	31	31
Cody Reed	1	3	3.98	17	7	0	43.0	45	21	19	15	42
Jackson Stephens	2	3	4.93	29	0	0	38.1	50	30	21	15	33
Austin Brice	2	3	5.79	33	0	0	37.1	39	26	24	13	32
Dylan Floro	3	2	2.72	25	0	0	36.1	39	12	11	12	27
Brandon Finnegan	0	3	7.40	5	5	0	20.2	27	20	17	15	14
Matt Wisler	0	0	2.03	11	0	0	13.1	11	4	3	2	11
Robert Stephenson	0	2	9.26	4	3	0	11.2	17	12	12	12	11
Kyle Crockett	1	0	5.79	15	0	0	9.1	16	8	6	2	11
Keury Mella	0	0	8.68	4	0	0	9.1	13	9	9	8	8
Kevin Quackenbush	0	1	11.00	10	0	0	9.0	13	11	11	6	7
Kevin Shackelford	0	1	7.88	5	0	0	8.0	13	8	7	4	7
Tanner Rainey	0	0	24.43	8	0	0	7.0	13	19	19	12	7
Jesús Reyes	0	0	3.18	5	0	0	5.2	4	4	2	2	2
Lucas Sims	0	0	6.75	3	0	0	5.1	3	4	4	5	6
Yovani Gallardo	0	0	30.86	3	0	0	2.1	8	8	8	4	2
Brandon Dixon	0	0	0.00	2	0	0	1.1	0	0	0	0	1
Alex Blandino	0	0	0.00	1	0	0	1.0	1	0	0	0	2
Cliff Pennington	0	0	9.00	1	0	0	1.0	1	1	1	2	1
Phil Ervin	0	0	0.00	1	0	0	0.1	0	0	0	0	0
Zack Weiss	0	0	inf	1	0	0	0.0	2	4	4	2	0
Team totals	67	95	4.63	162	162	38	1441.0	1491	819	741	532	1258

== Roster ==
2018 Cincinnati Reds
Roster
Pitchers: 34 Homer Bailey; 40 Austin Brice; 58 Luis Castillo; 51 Kyle Crockett; 28 Anthony DeSclafani; 29 Brandon Finnegan; 63 Dylan Floro; 31 Yovani Gallardo; 50 Amir Garrett; 32 Matt Harvey; 37 David Hernandez; 48 Jared Hughes; 26 Raisel Iglesias; 21 Michael Lorenzen; 30 Tyler Mahle; 36 Keury Mella; 53 Wandy Peralta; 61 Kevin Quackenbush; 44 Tanner Rainey; 25 Cody Reed; 57 Jesús Reyes; 47 Sal Romano; 41 Kevin Shackelford; 39 Lucas Sims; 62 Jackson Stephens; 55 Robert Stephenson; 49 Zack Weiss; 41 Matt Wisler	Catchers: 16 Tucker Barnhart; 38 Curt Casali; 17 Tony Cruz; 17 Tim Federowicz; 39 Devin Mesoraco; Infielders: 2 Alex Blandino; 4 Brandon Dixon; 3 Scooter Gennett; 46 Philip Gosselin; 15 Dilson Herrera; 4 Cliff Pennington; 9 José Peraza; 7 Eugenio Suárez; 51 Blake Trahan; 19 Joey Votto	Outfielders: 63 Aristides Aquino; 23 Adam Duvall; 27 Phil Ervin; 61 Gabriel Guerrero; 6 Billy Hamilton; 12 Rosell Herrera; 43 Scott Schebler; 12 Preston Tucker; 46 Mason Williams; 33 Jesse Winker	Manager: 38 Bryan Price; 35 Jim Riggleman; Coaches: 45 Freddie Benavides (first base/infield); 52 Danny Darwin (pitching); 88 Derrin Ebert (coach); 22 Billy Hatcher (third base/outfield); 87 Dustin Hughes (bullpen catcher); 64 Tony Jaramillo (assistant hitting); 57 Mack Jenkins (pitching); 60 Pat Kelly (bench); 59 Don Long (hitting); 56 Ted Power (assistant pitching/bullpen); 35 Jim Riggleman (bench); 72 Mike Stefanski (catching)

== Farm system ==
Level	Team	League	Manager
AAA	Louisville Bats	International League	Pat Kelly
AA	Pensacola Blue Wahoos	Southern League	Jody Davis
A	Daytona Tortugas	Florida State League	Ricky Gutierrez
A	Dayton Dragons	Midwest League	Luis Bolivar
A-Rookie Advanced	Billings Mustangs	Pioneer League	Ray Martinez
A-Rookie Advanced	Greeneville Reds	Appalachian League	Gookie Dawkins
Rookie	AZL Reds	Arizona League	Jose Nieves
Rookie	DSL Reds	Dominican Summer League	Cristobal Rodriguez
