= Bryan Price =

American baseball player, coach, and manager (born 1962)

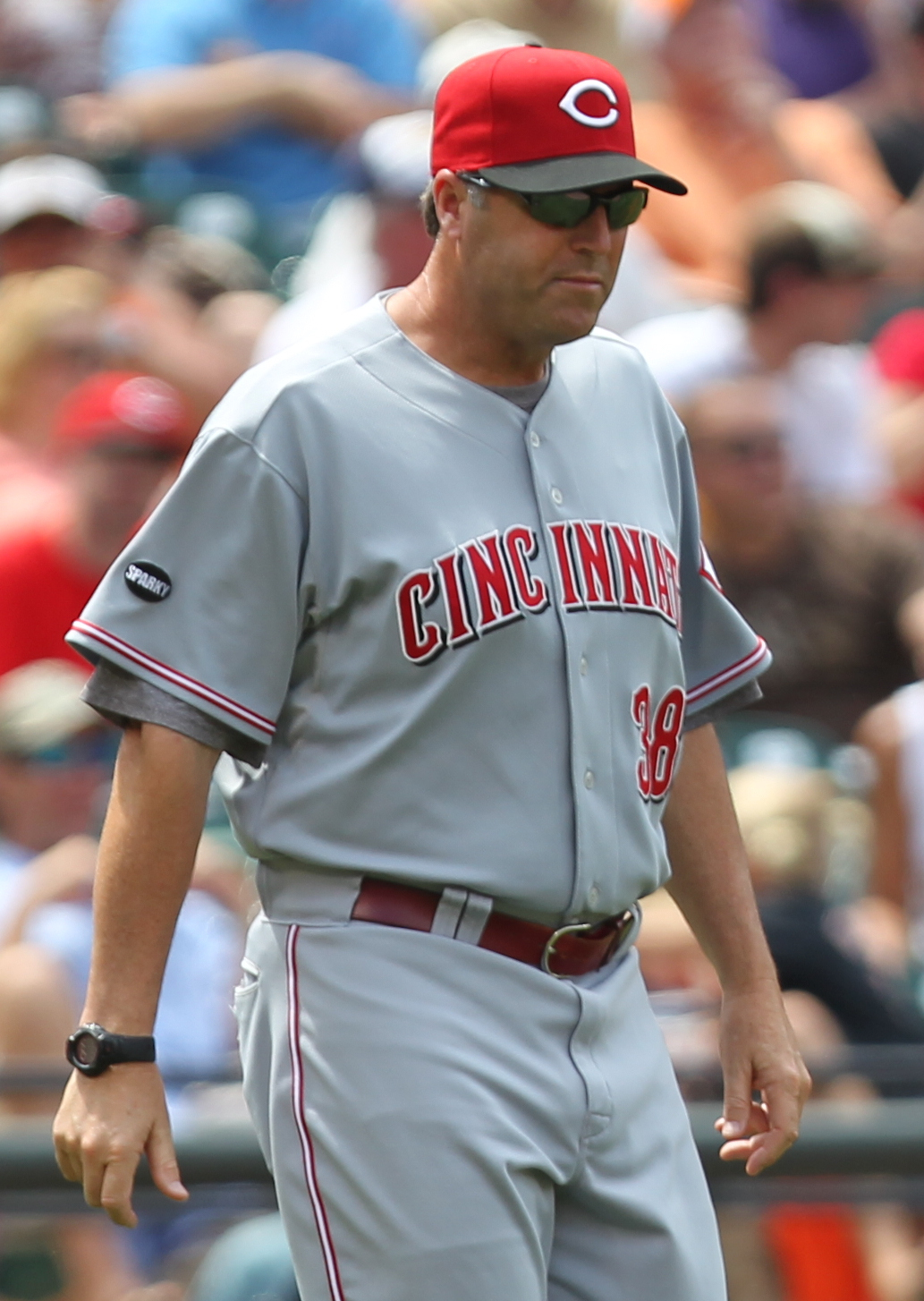
- Price as the Reds' pitching coach, 2011
- Coach
- Born: June 22, 1962 (age 64); San Francisco, California, U.S.
- Bats: Left Throws: Left

MLB statistics
- Managerial record: 279–387
- Winning %: .419
- Stats at Baseball Reference
- Managerial record at Baseball Reference

Teams
- As coach: Seattle Mariners (2000–2005); Arizona Diamondbacks (2006–2009); Cincinnati Reds (2010–2013); Philadelphia Phillies (2020); San Diego Padres (2022–2023); San Francisco Giants (2024); As manager: Cincinnati Reds (2014–2018)

Bryan Roberts Price (born June 22, 1962) is an American professional baseball coach and manager. Price was the manager of the Cincinnati Reds of Major League Baseball (MLB), from 2014 through 2018. He most recently served as the pitching coach for the San Francisco Giants.

After pitching in the minor leagues, Price has served as the pitching coach for the Seattle Mariners, Arizona Diamondbacks, and Cincinnati Reds before being named manager of the Reds. The Reds named Price the 61st manager in club history on October 22, 2013, replacing Dusty Baker. However, after 4 consecutive losing seasons, and a 3–15 start to the season in 2018, he was fired by the Reds, along with his pitching coach at the time, Mack Jenkins, and replaced by Jim Riggleman.

== Playing career ==
Price attended Tamalpais High School in Mill Valley, California, and the University of California, Berkeley, where he played college baseball for the California Golden Bears baseball team. He was drafted by the California Angels in the eighth round of the 1984 Major League Baseball draft (190th overall). Price began his Minor League Baseball (MiLB) career in 1984, advancing to the Class AA Midland Angels over 3 seasons in the Angels farm system; he was released following the 1986 season.

Price then took 1987 off and signed with the Seattle Mariners organization. He split two seasons between AA and the AAA Calgary Cannons. Over the course of Price's five-year MiLB career, he compiled a record of 31–19 with a 3.74 earned run average (ERA) in 90 games, 75 of which were starts.

== Coaching career ==
=== Seattle Mariners ===
Price was the Seattle Mariners pitching coach from 2001 to 2006. Price earned USA Today Baseball Weekly's Pitching Coach of the Year Award in 2001 after leading that staff to the American League ERA title with a 3.54 mark, an improvement of almost one run per game from the previous season.

=== Arizona Diamondbacks ===
Price was the Arizona Diamondbacks pitching coach until May 7, 2009, when he resigned after manager Bob Melvin was replaced by A. J. Hinch. Price was named Major League Coach of the Year by Baseball America in 2007 after his Diamondbacks staff posted a 4.13 ERA, fourth best in the National League, on the way to the National League Championship Series. He also worked for the Philadelphia Phillies in 2009 as a minor league consultant.

=== Cincinnati Reds ===
On October 17, 2009, Price was hired as the pitching coach of the Cincinnati Reds.

=== Philadelphia Phillies ===
On October 31, 2019, Price was named the Philadelphia Phillies pitching coach. Following the 2020 season, Price announced his retirement from full time coaching.

=== San Diego Padres ===
On December 20, 2021, Price was hired by the San Diego Padres to serve as a senior advisor to the Major League coaching staff.

=== San Francisco Giants ===
On November 14, 2023, Price was hired by the San Francisco Giants to serve as their pitching coach. On October 15, 2024, Price stepped down from his role.

== Managerial career ==
=== Cincinnati Reds ===
Price was hired as manager of the Cincinnati Reds on October 21, 2013, replacing Dusty Baker, and was publicly announced at a news conference on October 22. On September 26, 2014, the team announced that Price and Walt Jocketty would return for the 2015 season.

On April 20, 2015, Price went on an angry, expletive-filled rant to a gathering of the Cincinnati media before a 6–1 win over the Milwaukee Brewers over reporters leaking undisclosed developments about players that he believed would put his team at a competitive disadvantage. In particular, he was upset that a Cincinnati Enquirer reporter saw catcher Devin Mesoraco on his flight, and then tweeted the catcher wasn't available to play during a game in St. Louis because of injury. In the rant, Price used the variations of the f-word 77 times and 11 other profanities. The Cincinnati Enquirer's official website posted an edited audio version of the rant, but later removed it. The audio was later uploaded independently to the internet and re-posted by Deadspin.

On May 23, 2015, Price was ejected before a baseball game against the Cleveland Indians began. He got into a dispute with the umpiring crew while delivering the lineup card, and was tossed.

On October 3, 2015, it was announced that Price would remain as manager of the Reds for 2016. On September 2, 2017, despite a mixed season, it was announced that Price would be returning as manager of the Reds for the 2018 season.

After a 3–15 start to begin 2018, the Reds released Price on April 19, 2018. He was temporarily replaced by bench coach Jim Riggleman. Price finished with a record of 279 wins and 387 losses.

In August 2019, he became a United States national baseball team coach for the 2019 WBSC Premier12 tournament. The team finished fourth in the tournament, and failed to qualify for the 2020 Olympics as it finished behind Mexico, but will have another opportunity to qualify.

=== Managerial record ===
As of games played on April 18, 2018

Team	From	To	Regular season record			Post–season record		
Team	From	To	W	L	Win %	W	L	Win %
Cincinnati Reds	2014	2018	279	387	.419	DNQ		
Total			279	387	.419	0	0	–
Ref.:
