= Micah Johnson (baseball) =

American baseball player (born 1990)

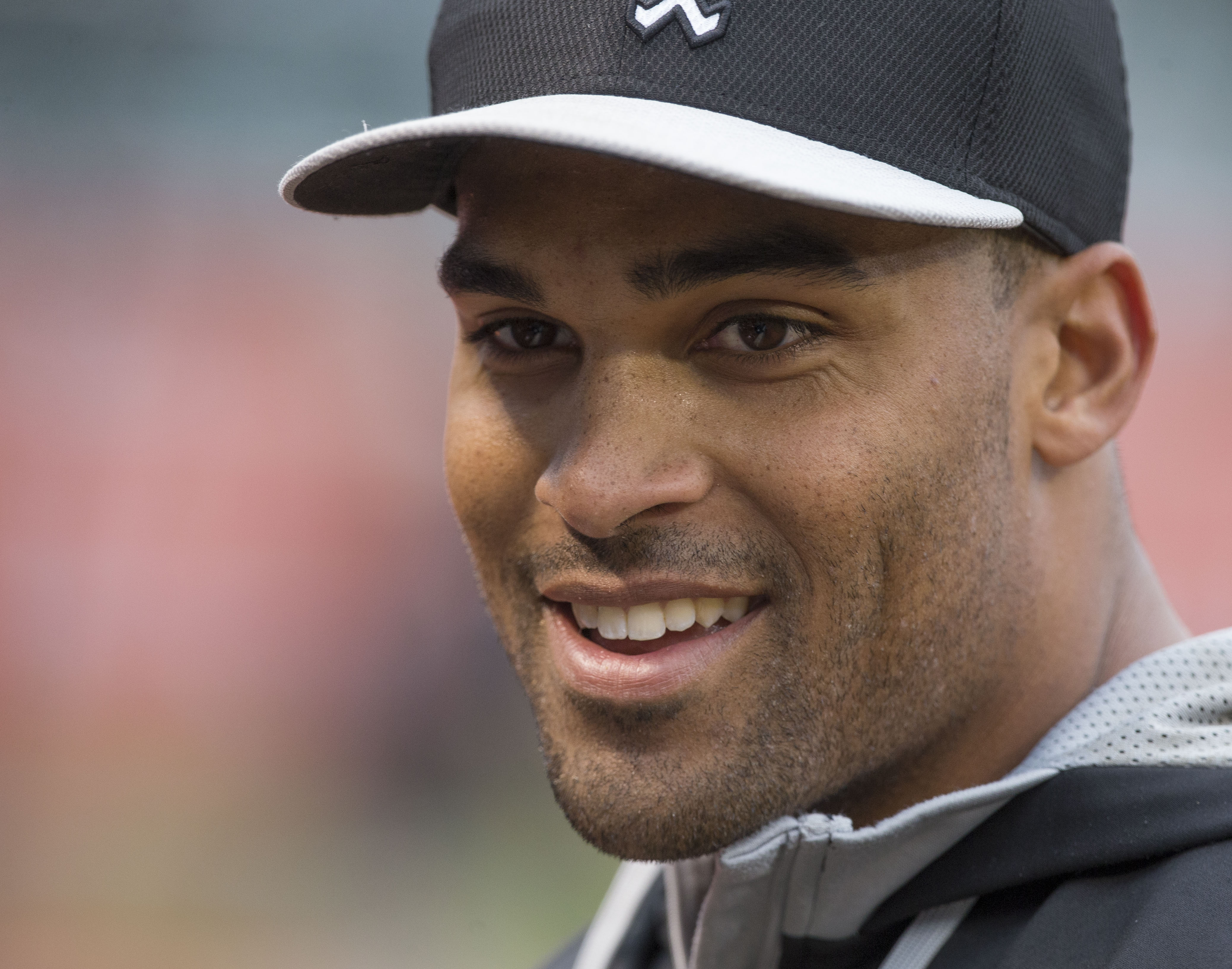
- Johnson with the Chicago White Sox in 2015
- Second baseman
- Born: December 18, 1990 (age 35); Indianapolis, Indiana, U.S.
- Batted: Left Threw: Right

MLB debut
- April 6, 2015, for the Chicago White Sox

Last MLB appearance
- October 1, 2017, for the Atlanta Braves

MLB statistics
- Batting average: .224
- Home runs: 0
- Runs batted in: 4
- Stats at Baseball Reference

Teams
- Chicago White Sox (2015); Los Angeles Dodgers (2016); Atlanta Braves (2017)

Micah Drew Johnson (born December 18, 1990) is an American former professional baseball second baseman. He played in Major League Baseball (MLB) for the Chicago White Sox, Los Angeles Dodgers, and Atlanta Braves.

== Amateur baseball career ==
Johnson attended Park Tudor School in Indianapolis, Indiana, and Indiana University Bloomington, where he played college baseball for the Indiana Hoosiers baseball team. In 2011, he played collegiate summer baseball with the Cotuit Kettleers of the Cape Cod Baseball League.

== Professional baseball career ==
=== Chicago White Sox ===
The Chicago White Sox selected Johnson in the ninth round of the 2012 MLB draft. He started his career in 2012 with the rookie level Great Falls Voyagers. He finished the 2012 season hitting .273 in 271 at-bats with, 10 doubles, five triples, four home runs, 25 runs batted in (RBIs), and 19 stolen bases. Johnson was promoted to the Kannapolis Intimidators of the Single-A South Atlantic League for the start of the 2013 season. There, he hit .342 in 304 at-bats with 17 doubles, 11 triples, six home runs, 42 RBI, and 61 stolen bases. Due to his stellar play in the first half of the 2013 season, Johnson was promoted to the Winston-Salem Dash of the High-A Carolina League and then the Birmingham Barons of the Double-A Southern League for the final week of the season. Johnson finished the 2013 season hitting a combined .312 in 536 at bats, 24 doubles, 15 triples, seven home runs, 58 RBI, 50 walks, 98 strikeouts and 84 stolen bases.

Johnson began the 2014 season with Birmingham, and was promoted to the Charlotte Knights of the Triple-A International League in May. His season ended in August due to an injury to his left hamstring.

Johnson earned a spot on the White Sox 2015 Opening Day roster, batting ninth and played second base. He record his first major league hit, a single, in his second plate appearance.

=== Los Angeles Dodgers ===
On December 16, 2015, Johnson was traded to the Los Angeles Dodgers (with Frankie Montas and Trayce Thompson) as part of a three team trade that sent Todd Frazier to the White Sox and José Peraza, Brandon Dixon and Scott Schebler to the Cincinnati Reds. He was assigned to the Triple-A Oklahoma City Dodgers to begin the season. He appeared in seven games in the majors, with one hit in six at-bats and 120 games in Oklahoma City, where he had a .261 batting average. Johnson was designated for assignment by the Dodgers on January 10, 2017.

=== Atlanta Braves ===
On January 13, 2017, Johnson was traded to the Atlanta Braves in exchange for a player to be named later or cash considerations. Johnson fractured his wrist while making a diving catch in a spring training game on March 14. After surgery and rehabilitation, Johnson played eleven games for the Gwinnett Braves and was promoted to Atlanta on July 28.

=== Tampa Bay Rays ===
On October 26, 2017, Johnson was claimed off waivers by the Cincinnati Reds. However, on October 30, Johnson was claimed off waivers by the San Francisco Giants. He was designated for assignment on November 20 after multiple prospects were added to the roster. Johnson was claimed off waivers once more on November 27, this time by the Tampa Bay Rays. On February 13, 2018, Johnson was outrighted to the minors by the Rays and removed from their 40-man roster. He played in 74 games for the Triple–A Durham Bulls, hitting .198/.250/.345 with five home runs and 31 RBI. Johnson elected free agency following the season on November 2.

== Art career ==
Retiring from baseball after the 2018 season, Johnson shifted his focus to creating artwork, a hobby he had only started 3 years before. He opened an art studio in New Hampshire where he created physical artwork on canvas. Johnson also ventured into the new and fast-growing medium of NFTs. He sold multiple pieces in early 2020, selling one NFT in April for six Ethereum or approximately $940. His works frequently depicted black children in an inspirational or encouraging light.

In partnership with a blockchain-based art platform, Johnson unveiled a new piece called 'sä-v(ə-)rən-tē: on October 28, 2020. The inspiration stems from overhearing his then 4-year-old nephew ask his mother, "Can astronauts be Black?" Johnson's stated mission was to take two black youths who faced adversity and give them "sovereignty" or in other words empower them. The scene features two boys on one side of a door with an astronaut on the other. Every year on the boys’ birthdays, a QR code will pop up over the original artwork asking for Bitcoin donation. The door that is standing between them will open more each year, for eleven years, until they are face to face. This will happen on the boys 18th birthday. The boys becoming face-to-face with the astronaut is meant to symbolize them becoming adults and finally able to pursue their dreams while having options, due to the donations of the viewers.

'sä-v(ə-)rən-tē: was made available to purchase on October 29, 2020. After a period of bidding, it was sold for $117,278. At the time it was the second highest sale price for an NFT art piece, right behind Block 21 which sold at Christie's for $130K.

== Personal life ==
During the 2014 season, Johnson took online classes through Indiana University to finish his degree. Along with his baseball career, he is also an artist and posts many of his works on his Instagram page. He intends to go to law school after his playing career, with the goal of becoming an MLB general manager.
