= Brandon Dixon (baseball) =

American baseball player (born 1992)

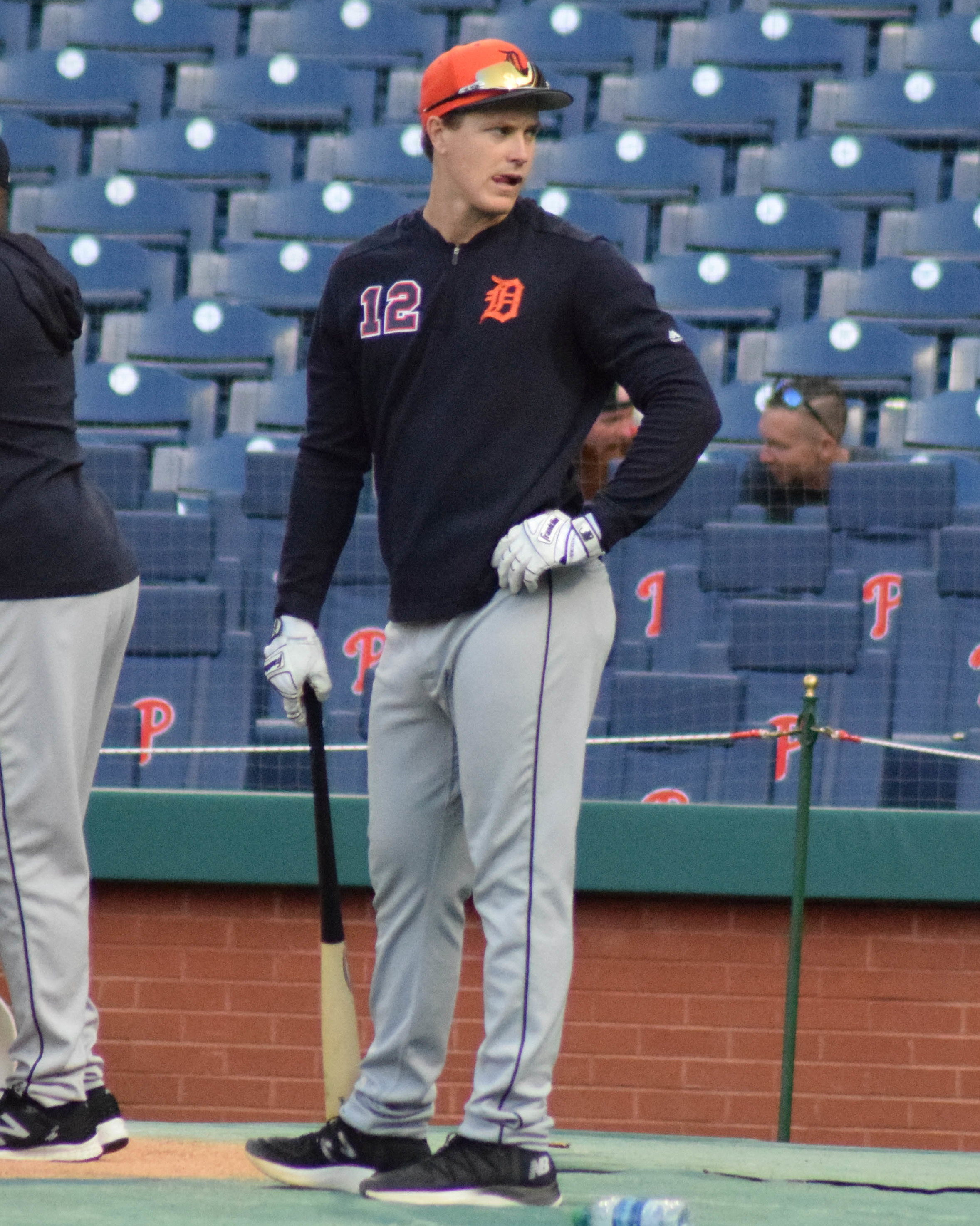
- Dixon with the Detroit Tigers in 2019
- Infielder / Outfielder
- Born: January 29, 1992 (age 34); La Jolla, California, U.S.
- Batted: Right Threw: Right

Professional debut
- MLB: May 22, 2018, for the Cincinnati Reds
- NPB: April 23, 2021, for the Tohoku Rakuten Golden Eagles

Last appearance
- MLB: July 16, 2023, for the San Diego Padres
- NPB: October 2, 2021, for the Tohoku Rakuten Golden Eagles

MLB statistics
- Batting average: .224
- Home runs: 22
- Runs batted in: 74

NPB statistics
- Batting average: .167
- Home runs: 4
- Runs batted in: 15
- Stats at Baseball Reference

Teams
- Cincinnati Reds (2018); Detroit Tigers (2019–2020); Tohoku Rakuten Golden Eagles (2021); San Diego Padres (2022–2023)

Brandon Allen Dixon (born January 29, 1992) is an American former professional baseball infielder and outfielder. He played in Major League Baseball (MLB) for the Detroit Tigers, Cincinnati Reds, and San Diego Padres, and in Nippon Professional Baseball (NPB) for the Tohoku Rakuten Golden Eagles.

== Career ==
=== Amateur career ===
Dixon attended Murrieta Valley High School in Murrieta, California where he played high-school baseball alongside Patrick Wisdom, before enrolling at the University of Arizona and playing college baseball for the Arizona Wildcats in the Pac-12 Conference. After playing sparingly as a freshman, Dixon appeared in 62 games during the 2012 season during which the team won the College World Series. In his junior season, Dixon led the Pac-12 Conference both with a .369 batting average and 30 stolen bases and was named a third-team Louisville Slugger All-American.

=== Los Angeles Dodgers ===
After his junior season at Arizona, Dixon was drafted by the Los Angeles Dodgers in the third round of the 2013 MLB draft. He signed and spent 2013 with the Single–A Great Lakes Loons where he slashed .185/.227/.261 with one home run and 17 RBIs in 59 games. In 2014, he played for the High–A Rancho Cucamonga Quakes compiling a .262 batting average with nine home runs and 46 RBIs in 94 games, and in 2015, he played for both the Quakes and Double-A Tulsa Drillers, batting .263 with 19 home runs, 68 RBIs, and 26 stolen bases in 128 games between the two teams.

=== Cincinnati Reds ===
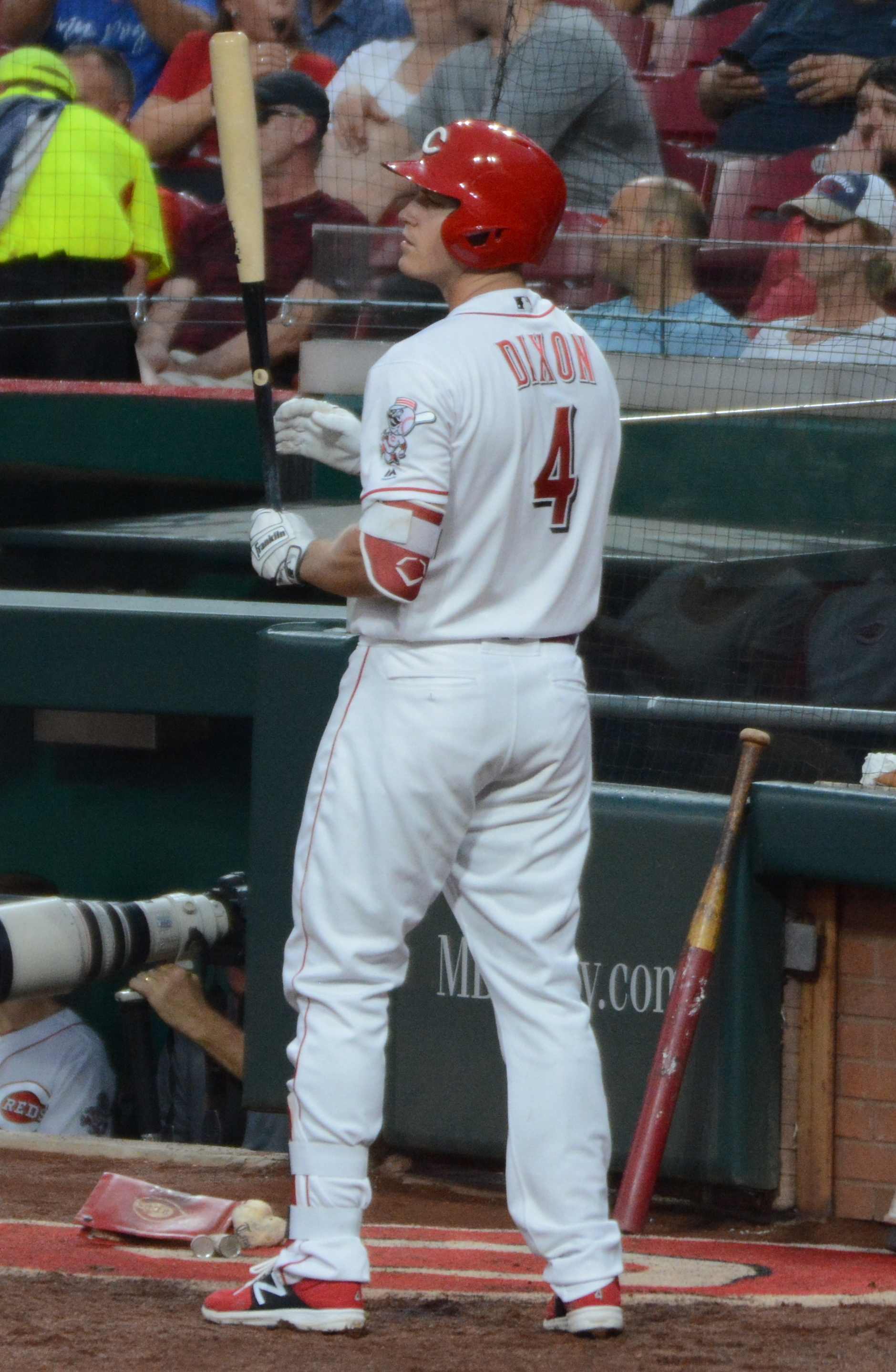
Dixon on deck for the Cincinnati Reds in 2018

On December 16, 2015, Dixon was traded to the Cincinnati Reds (with José Peraza and Scott Schebler) in a three team trade that sent Frankie Montas, Micah Johnson and Trayce Thompson to the Dodgers and Todd Frazier to the Chicago White Sox. He spent 2016 with the Double-A Pensacola Blue Wahoos where he slashed .260/.315/.434 with 16 home runs and 65 RBIs in 118 games, and 2017 with the Triple-A Louisville Bats where he collected a .264 batting average with 16 home runs, 64 RBIs, and a .783 OPS in 124 games.

Dixon was called up to the majors for the first time on May 22, 2018. On May 24 he collected his first three major league hits, going on to play in 74 games for the Reds during the 2018 season at six different defensive positions, in addition to two appearances as a pitcher. He batted .178/.218/.356 in 118 at bats and was recorded as having the fastest base-running sprint speed of all major league first basemen, at 28.9 feet/second.

=== Detroit Tigers ===
Dixon was claimed off waivers by the Detroit Tigers on November 2, 2018. He began the 2019 season with the Triple-A Toledo Mud Hens before being promoted to the major leagues on April 18. In a May 5 game against the Kansas City Royals, Dixon hit a tenth-inning, walk-off three-run homer to give the Tigers a 5–2 victory. Dixon finished 2019 with a .248 average, 52 RBI and a team-leading 15 home runs in 391 major league at-bats. He had the fastest sprint speed of all major league first basemen, at 28.5 feet/second. On December 21, 2019, Dixon was designated for assignment by the Tigers to make room on the 40-man roster for two free agent signings. He cleared waivers and was outrighted to the Toledo Mud Hens on January 8. On September 22, 2020, Dixon was selected to the Tigers 40-man and active rosters. Dixon appeared in only 5 games for the Tigers in 2020, going 1-for-13.

He was released by the Tigers on November 19, 2020, with the intention that he would be heading to a team in Nippon Professional Baseball.

=== Tohoku Rakuten Golden Eagles ===
Days after his release from Detroit, Dixon signed with the Tohoku Rakuten Golden Eagles of Nippon Professional Baseball. On April 23, 2021, Dixon made his NPB debut. Dixon played in 38 games for the Golden Eagles, hitting .167 with 4 home runs and 35 RBIs. He became a free agent following the season.

=== San Diego Padres ===
On March 26, 2022, Dixon signed a minor league contract with the San Diego Padres. In the minor leagues in 2022 he led the minors in slugging percentage (.823) in 198 at bats while batting .374 with a .442 on base percentage and 23 home runs. His contract was selected on September 27. In 5 games for San Diego, Dixon went 3-for-14 with no home runs and one RBI.

Dixon was optioned to the Triple-A El Paso Chihuahuas to begin the 2023 season. In 33 games for San Diego, he batted .203/.244/.329 with 2 home runs and 9 RBI. On August 2, 2023, Dixon was designated for assignment following the acquisition of Scott Barlow. He cleared waivers and was sent outright to Triple–A El Paso on August 5. On October 2, Dixon elected free agency.

On February 29, 2024, Dixon announced his retirement from professional baseball.
