= José Peraza =

Venezuelan baseball player (born 1994)

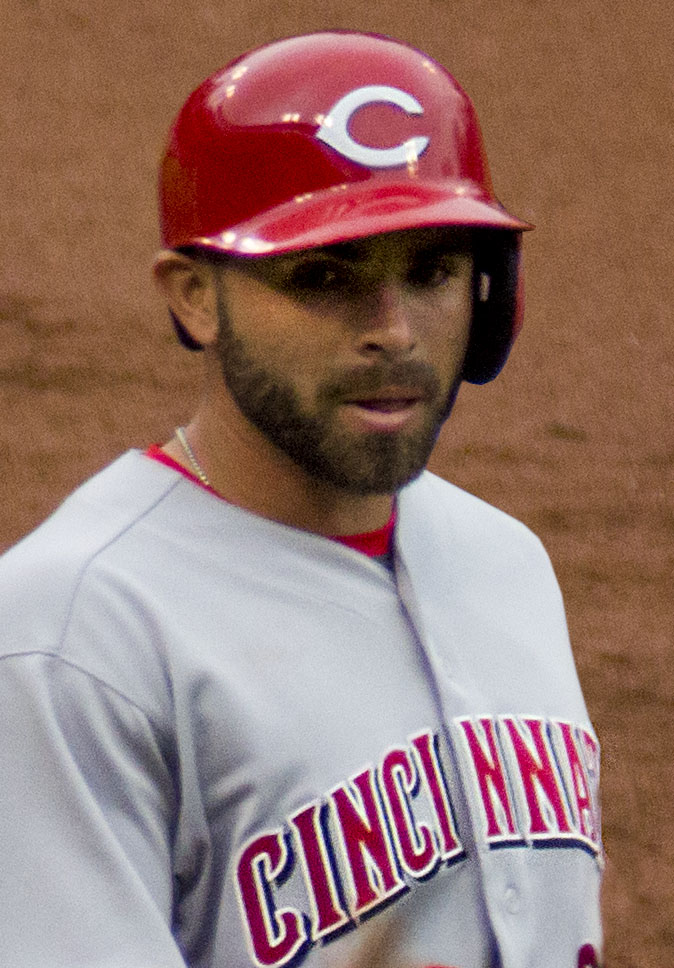
- Peraza with the Cincinnati Reds

Free agent
- Shortstop / Second baseman
- Born: April 30, 1994 (age 32); Barinas, Barinas, Venezuela
- Bats: Right Throws: Right

MLB debut
- August 10, 2015, for the Los Angeles Dodgers

MLB statistics (through 2021 season)
- Batting average: .266
- Home runs: 35
- Runs batted in: 182
- Stats at Baseball Reference

Teams
- Los Angeles Dodgers (2015); Cincinnati Reds (2016–2019); Boston Red Sox (2020); New York Mets (2021)

José Francisco Peraza Polo (born April 30, 1994) is a Venezuelan professional baseball second baseman and shortstop who is a free agent. He has previously played in Major League Baseball (MLB) for the Los Angeles Dodgers, Cincinnati Reds, Boston Red Sox, and New York Mets. Listed at 6 feet 0 inches (1.83 m) and 185 pounds (84 kg), he bats and throws right-handed.

== Career ==
=== Atlanta Braves ===
Peraza signed with the Atlanta Braves for $350,000 as an international free agent on July 2, 2010. He made his professional debut in 2011 for the Dominican Summer League Braves. Peraza split the 2012 season between the Gulf Coast League Braves and the Danville Braves. He was promoted to the Rome Braves in 2013, where he spent the whole season. He started 2014 with the Lynchburg Hillcats of the High–A Carolina League. In 66 games with Lynchburg, Peraza batted .342 and stole 35 bases. He was promoted to the Mississippi Braves of the Double–A Southern League in June, and selected to play in the All-Star Futures Game in July. Peraza was also named the Braves top prospect and #58 on MLB.com's Top 100 list. He hit .339/364/.441 with 60 stolen bases between the two levels. At the end of the season, Peraza was named the Braves Minor League Player of the Year.

The Braves added Peraza to their 40-man roster on November 19, 2014, to protect him from being selected in the Rule 5 draft. He was invited to spring training in 2015, and sent down on March 16 to begin the season with the Gwinnett Braves of the Triple–A International League. With the emergence of Jace Peterson at second base, the Braves decided to begin starting Peraza at center field to increase his experience in the outfield and overall versatility. When outfielder Mallex Smith was promoted to Triple-A in June 2015, Peraza returned to man second base.

=== Los Angeles Dodgers ===
On July 30, 2015, in a three-team trade, the Los Angeles Dodgers acquired Peraza, Mat Latos, Michael Morse, Bronson Arroyo, Alex Wood, Jim Johnson, and Luis Avilán, while the Miami Marlins acquired minor league pitchers Victor Araujo, Jeff Brigham, and Kevin Guzman, and the Braves received Héctor Olivera, Paco Rodriguez, minor league pitcher Zachary Bird and a competitive balance draft pick for the 2016 MLB draft. He was initially assigned to the Oklahoma City Dodgers of the Triple–A Pacific Coast League, however, he was promoted to the major league roster on August 10 and made his debut that night as the starting second baseman against the Washington Nationals. His first major league hit was a triple off of Nationals starter Gio González. He was the third Los Angeles Dodger to hit a triple in his first major league game, joining Doug Rau in 1972 and Gary Moore in 1970. He wound up battling hamstring injuries during his time with the club and only played in seven games before he was shut down for good. In those games, he had four hits (including one double and one triple) in 22 at-bats for a .182 average and also stole three bases.

=== Cincinnati Reds ===
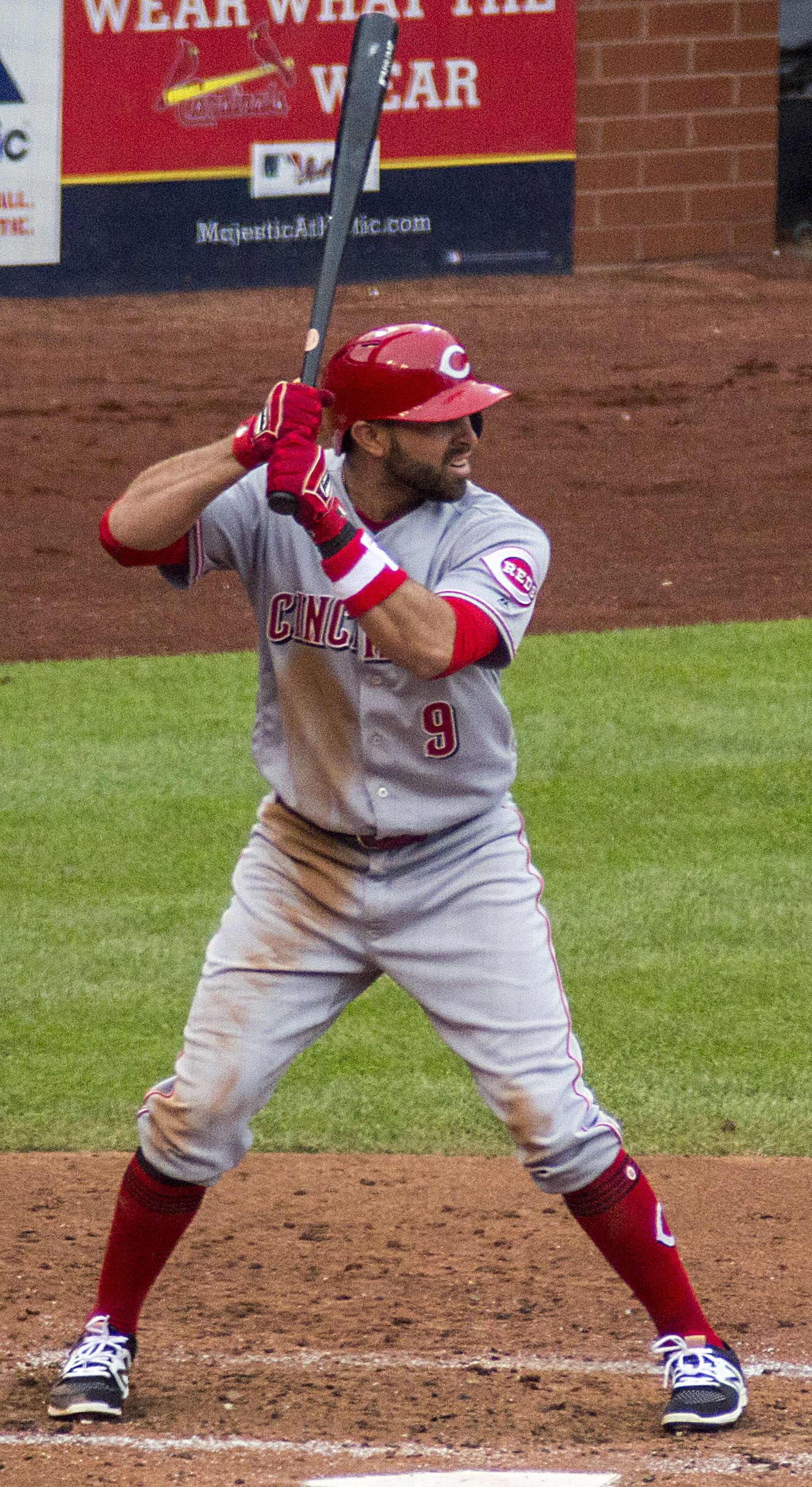
Peraza with Cincinnati, batting in St. Louis in 2017

On December 16, 2015, Peraza, along with Scott Schebler and Brandon Dixon, were traded to the Cincinnati Reds in a three team trade that sent Frankie Montas, Micah Johnson and Trayce Thompson to the Dodgers and Todd Frazier to the Chicago White Sox. Peraza opened the 2016 season with the Louisville Bats of the International League, playing as a shortstop. He had spent time with the major league team in spring training, but was sent to the minors so he could get regular playing time. Peraza was recalled for the first time in 2016 on May 13, and returned to Louisville five days later. On June 14, Peraza was recalled for the second time, and expected to play a utility role. He was optioned to the minors on August 2, as the Reds wanted him to play regularly at shortstop. On August 21, he returned to the Reds, starting at shortstop in place of the injured Zack Cozart. In 2016 in the majors he batted .324/.352/.411 with 3 home runs.

During the 2016–17 offseason, Brandon Phillips was traded to the Atlanta Braves, a move that was expected to give Peraza a chance to become the Reds' starting second baseman. Just after the All-Star break, Peraza had lost his starting position to Scooter Gennett. He played in 143 games, getting 487 at bats for the Reds, hitting .257 with 5 home runs, 37 RBIs, and 23 stolen bases, while leading the majors in percentage of soft-hit batted balls (26.6%). He had the lowest ISO (Isolated Power) of all MLB players in 2017, at .066.

Peraza was named the Reds' starting shortstop prior to the start of the 2018 season. He batted .288/.326/.416 with 14 home runs. He had the lowest fielding percentage among major league shortstops, at .963. Peraza made 141 appearances for Cincinnati in 2019, slashing .239/.285/.346 with six home runs, 33 RBI, and seven stolen bases. Peraza was non-tendered on December 2, 2019, and became a free agent.

=== Boston Red Sox ===
Peraza signed a major league deal with the Boston Red Sox on December 13, 2019. He made his Red Sox debut against the Baltimore Orioles on July 24, 2020, getting his first hit, a double, in the third inning. The Red Sox optioned Peraza to the team's alternate training site on September 9; he had appeared at multiple positions for Boston: second base, third base, shortstop, left field, designated hitter, and pitcher. Overall with the 2020 Red Sox, Peraza appeared in 34 games, batting .225 with one home run and eight RBIs. On October 28, Peraza was outrighted off of the 40-man roster and elected free agency.

=== New York Mets ===
On November 4, 2020, Peraza signed a minor league deal with the New York Mets. On April 10, 2021, Peraza was selected to the active roster when J. D. Davis was placed on the injured list. He was sent back down without appearing in a game. He was activated again on April 27 after Stephen Tarpley was sent down. On April 30, he was deactivated again but was called up later that same day when Luis Guillorme was placed on the injured list. He had a clutch pinch hit in his first plate appearance of the season on Sunday Night Baseball on May 2. Peraza played in 64 games for the Mets, hitting .204 with 6 home runs and 20 RBI. On October 29, Peraza elected free agency.

=== New York Yankees ===
On November 28, 2021, Peraza signed a minor league contract with the New York Yankees. In 63 games with the Scranton/Wilkes-Barre RailRiders, he batted .239 with five home runs and 29 RBI. He was released on July 15, 2022.

=== Boston Red Sox (second stint) ===
On July 29, 2022, Peraza signed a minor-league contract with the Boston Red Sox. He played in 8 games for the Triple–A Worcester Red Sox, going 6–for–28 (.214) with no home runs and two RBI. Peraza elected free agency on November 10.

=== New York Mets (second stint) ===
On December 15, 2022, Peraza signed a minor league contract with the New York Mets organization. He split the 2023 season between the Triple–A Syracuse Mets, Single–A St. Lucie Mets, and rookie–level Florida Complex League Mets. In 49 combined appearances, Peraza registered a .258/.324/.359 with two home runs and 11 RBI. He elected free agency following the season on November 6, 2023.

=== Leones de Yucatán ===
On February 21, 2024, Peraza signed with the Leones de Yucatán of the Mexican League. In 79 appearances for Yucatán, he batted .302/.345/.403 with seven home runs and 41 RBI. Peraza was released by the Leones on February 21, 2025.

=== Saraperos de Saltillo ===
On April 14, 2025, Peraza signed with the Saraperos de Saltillo of the Mexican League. In 31 appearances for Saltillo, Peraza batted .331/.362/.496 with three home runs, 24 RBI, and one stolen base.

=== Acereros de Monclova ===
On June 3, 2025, Peraza was traded to the Acereros de Monclova of the Mexican League in exchange for Cameron Gann. He played in 44 games for Monclova, batting .351/.369/.508 with five home runs, 33 RBI, and three stolen bases.

Peraza made 30 appearances for Monclova during the 2026 season, in which he batted .232/.278/.259 with no home runs, 13 RBI, and three stolen bases. He was released by the Acereros on July 22.

== See also ==
- List of Major League Baseball players from Venezuela
