= Jesús Reyes (baseball) =

Dominican baseball player (born 1993)

Free agent
- Pitcher
- Born: February 21, 1993 (age 33); Santo Domingo, Dominican Republic
- Bats: Right Throws: Right

MLB debut
- August 4, 2018, for the Cincinnati Reds

MLB statistics (through 2018 season)
- Win–loss record: 0–0
- Earned run average: 3.18
- Strikeouts: 2
- Stats at Baseball Reference

Teams
- Cincinnati Reds (2018)

Jesús Emmanuel Reyes (born February 21, 1993) is a Dominican professional baseball pitcher who is a free agent. He has previously played in Major League Baseball (MLB) for the Cincinnati Reds.

== Amateur career ==
Reyes enrolled at ASA College and joined their baseball team where he pitched during his freshman season. He quickly became one of ASA's best pitchers, so the team moved Reyes into their starting rotation after his first outing of the season. In addition to a fastball, Reyes learned to throw a changeup and a slider. He made 9 starts for the Avengers, pitching to a 3–3 win–loss record with a 4.32 earned run average.

== Professional career ==
=== Cincinnati Reds ===
==== Minor leagues ====
Reyes signed with the Cincinnati Reds as an undrafted free agent on August 28, 2014. He made his professional debut in 2015 with the Arizona League Reds and spent the whole season there, collecting a 5–4 record and 3.40 ERA in 13 games (five starts). In 2016, he played for the Dayton Dragons where he went 5–5 with a 2.40 ERA and 1.17 WHIP in 30 games (20 relief appearances), and in 2017, he played for both the Daytona Tortugas and the Pensacola Blue Wahoos, pitching to a combined 8–9 record and 3.60 ERA in 25 total starts between the two teams.

On November 20, 2017, the Reds added Reyes to their 40-man roster to protect him from the Rule 5 draft.

==== Major leagues ====
On August 3, 2018, Reyes was promoted to the major leagues for the first time. The following day, Reyes made his debut, hitting Spencer Kieboom before throwing two scoreless innings. Reyes pitched in 5 games (5 2/3 innings) out of the Reds bullpen, giving up 2 earned runs for an ERA of 3.18.

On July 18, 2019, Reyes was designated for assignment following the signing of Ryan Lavarnway. He cleared waivers and was sent outright to the Triple–A Louisville Bats on July 23. In 43 games for Louisville, Reyes compiled a 5.03 ERA with 64 strikeouts across 77 innings pitched. He did not play in a game in 2020 due to the cancellation of the minor league season because of the COVID-19 pandemic.

=== New York Mets ===
On December 10, 2020, Reyes was claimed by the New York Mets in the minor league portion of the Rule 5 draft. In 25 games (19 starts) for the Triple–A Syracuse Mets, he registered a 4–9 record and 5.34 ERA with 105 strikeouts across 118 innings pitched. Reyes elected free agency following the season on November 7, 2021.

=== Acereros de Monclova ===
On May 27, 2022, Reyes signed with the Acereros de Monclova of the Mexican League. He appeared in 15 games and made 8 starts, going 4–1 with a 5.23 ERA and 38 strikeouts in 43 innings. Reyes was released on January 19, 2023.

=== Guerreros de Oaxaca ===
On June 11, 2023, Reyes signed with the Guerreros de Oaxaca of the Mexican League. In 18 games for Oaxaca, he logged a 4.45 ERA with 19 strikeouts and 4 saves across 28 1/3 innings pitched. On April 8, 2024, Reyes was released by the Guerreros.

=== Dorados de Chihuahua ===
On April 10, 2024, Reyes signed with the Dorados de Chihuahua of the Mexican League. In 23 games for Chihuahua, Reyes struggled to an 8.55 ERA with 19 strikeouts across 20 innings pitched. He was released on June 8.

=== Algodoneros de Unión Laguna ===
On June 12, 2024, Reyes signed with the Algodoneros de Unión Laguna of the Mexican League. In 19 games for the Algodoneros, he posted a 3.45 ERA with 10 strikeouts across 15 2/3 innings pitched.

Reyes made 40 relief appearances for Laguna in 2025, posting a 2–2 record with a 4.31 ERA, 25 walks, and 19 strikeouts across 39 2/3 innings of work.

In 2026, Reyes struggled to a 15.88 ERA, giving up 11 earned runs over just 5 2/3 innings for the Algodoneros. On May 4, 2026, Reyes was released by the team.

=== Saraperos de Saltillo ===
On May 15, 2026, Reyes signed with the Saraperos de Saltillo of the Mexican League. In 13 relief appearances for the Saraperos, he registered a 1–1 record with a 7.11 ERA, 10 strikeouts, and eight walks over 12 2/3 innings. On June 30, Reyes was released by Saltillo.
