= Mack Jenkins =

Baseball player (born 1965)

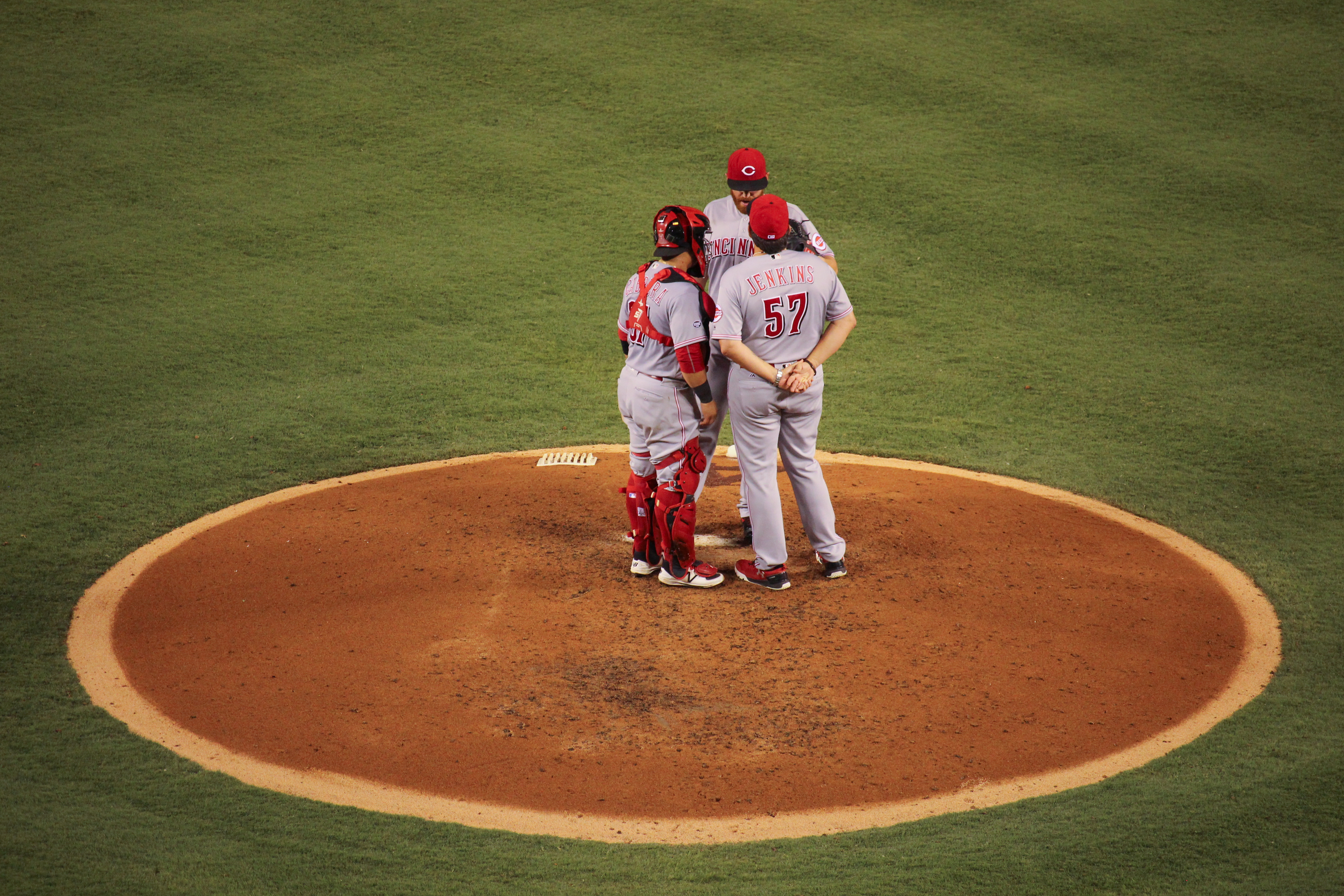
- Mack Jenkins with jersey number 57
- Pitching coach
- Born: April 22, 1965 (age 61)
- Bats: Right Throws: Right
- Stats at Baseball Reference

Mack Donald Jenkins (born April 22, 1965) is an American former professional baseball coach who last coached for the Cincinnati Reds.

== Career ==
Jenkins was a minor league baseball pitcher in the Reds organization from 1986 through 1988. He was the winning pitcher in the game that ended the longest winning streak in the history of professional baseball.

Jenkins served as pitching coach for the Louisville Bats of the Triple-A International League. He was named assistant pitching coach of the Reds in 2012.

On July 4, 2016, Jenkins was named pitching coach for the Cincinnati Reds, replacing Mark Riggins. He was fired on April 19, 2018, along with manager Bryan Price, due to poor pitching.
