= Scott Schebler =

American baseball player (born 1990)

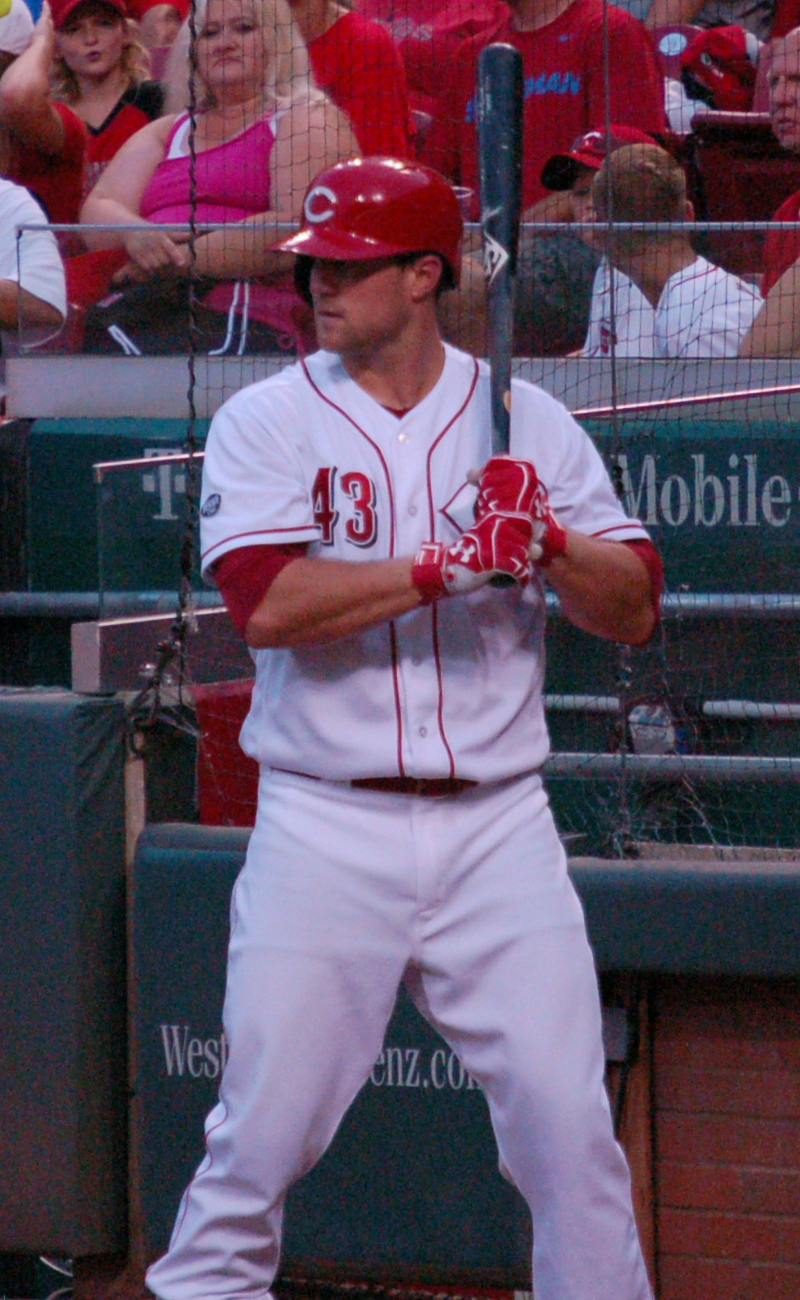
- Schebler with the Cincinnati Reds in 2016
- Outfielder
- Born: October 6, 1990 (age 36); Cedar Rapids, Iowa, U.S.
- Batted: Left Threw: Right

MLB debut
- June 5, 2015, for the Los Angeles Dodgers

Last MLB appearance
- June 30, 2021, for the Los Angeles Angels

MLB statistics
- Batting average: .237
- Home runs: 61
- Runs batted in: 167
- Stats at Baseball Reference

Teams
- Los Angeles Dodgers (2015); Cincinnati Reds (2016–2019); Atlanta Braves (2020); Los Angeles Angels (2021)

Scott Anthony Schebler (born October 6, 1990) is an American former professional baseball outfielder. He played in Major League Baseball (MLB) for the Los Angeles Dodgers, Cincinnati Reds, Atlanta Braves, and Los Angeles Angels.

== Amateur career ==
Raised in Shueyville, Iowa, Schebler attended Prairie High School in Cedar Rapids. Growing up, Schebler was a fan of the St. Louis Cardinals. In high school, Schebler was a five-sport athlete, playing baseball, football, basketball, soccer, and track & field. Schebler later attended Des Moines Area Community College in Boone, Iowa.

== Professional career ==
=== Los Angeles Dodgers ===
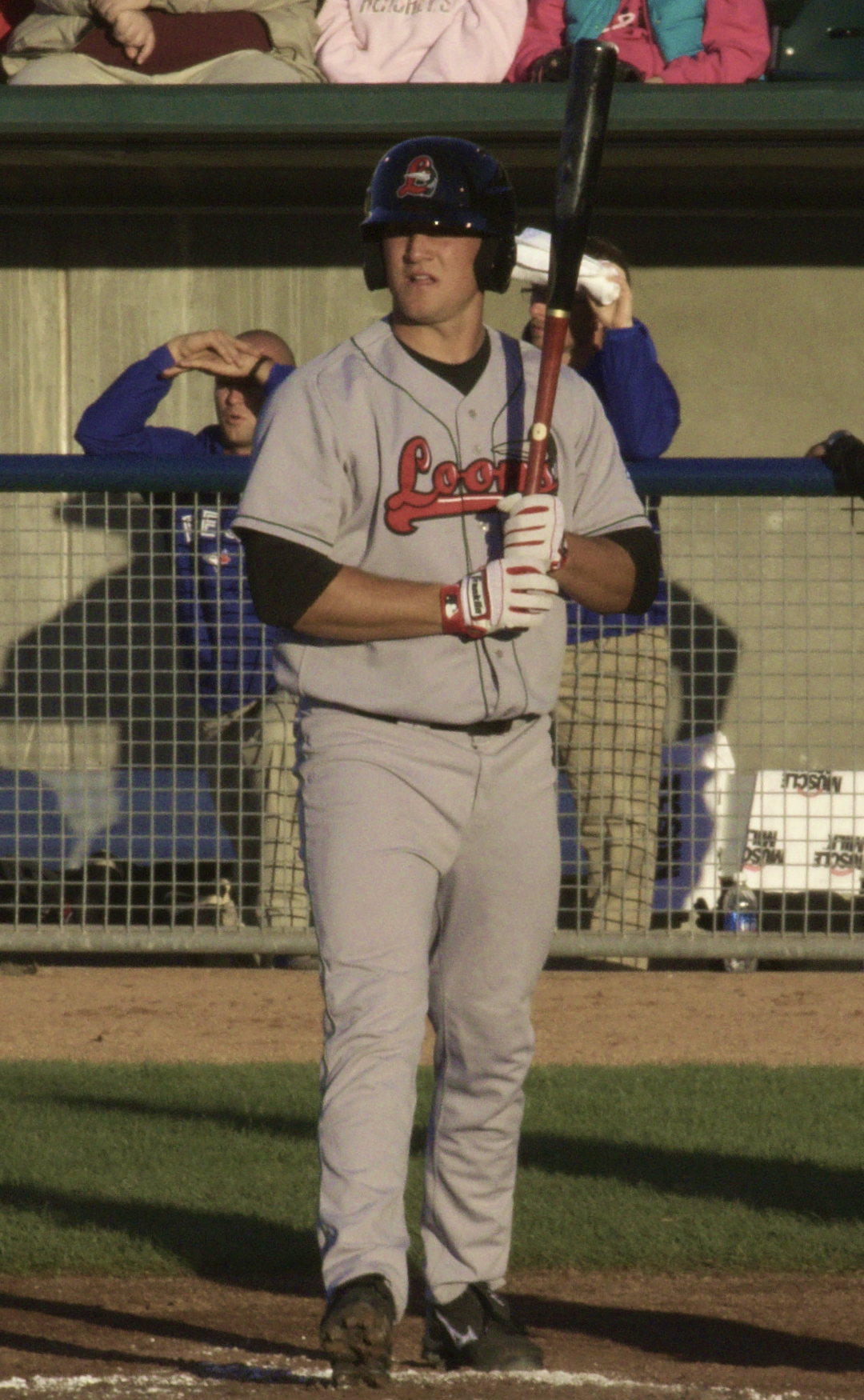
Schebler during his tenure with the Great Lakes Loons, single-A affiliates of the Dodgers, in 2012

Schebler was drafted by the Los Angeles Dodgers in the 26th round of the 2010 MLB draft out of Des Moines Area Community College. He began his career with five games for the Arizona League Dodgers in 2010. In 2011 with the Ogden Raptors of the Pioneer Baseball League, he hit .285 in 70 games with 12 home runs and 58 RBI, and in 2012 with the Great Lakes Loons of the Midwest League, he hit .312 with 6 homers and 67 RBI in 137 games.

Schebler had a breakthrough season in 2013 with the Rancho Cucamonga Quakes of the California League. In 125 games, he hit .296 with 27 home runs and 91 RBI to lead the entire Dodgers farm system in both homers and RBI. He was selected as a post-season California League All-Star and the Dodgers minor league player of the year. He was promoted to the Double-A Chattanooga Lookouts for 2014 and was selected to the mid-season Southern League All-Star Game. He was also selected as a post-season All-Star as he hit .280 with 28 homers and 73 RBI in 135 games. After the season, he played with the Glendale Desert Dogs in the Arizona Fall League and was selected to the AFL Top Prospects List.

On November 20, 2014, Schebler was added to the Dodgers 40-man roster to protect him from the Rule 5 Draft, and he was assigned to the AAA Oklahoma City Dodgers to start the 2015 season.

Schebler was called up to the majors by the Dodgers on June 5, 2015. He recorded his first big league hit on a single to left field on the first pitch he saw from Carlos Martínez of the St. Louis Cardinals. He was optioned back to Oklahoma City the next day. He completed the minor league season by hitting .241 in 121 games with 13 homers and 51 RBI for Oklahoma City and rejoined the Dodgers when rosters were expanded in September. He hit his first major league home run off of James Shields of the San Diego Padres on September 4, 2015. In 19 games with the Dodgers, he hit .250 with three homers and four RBI.

=== Cincinnati Reds ===
On December 16, 2015, Schebler, José Peraza, and Brandon Dixon, were traded to the Cincinnati Reds in a three-team trade that sent Frankie Montas, Micah Johnson, and Trayce Thompson to the Dodgers and Todd Frazier to the Chicago White Sox.

Making his first opening day roster with Cincinnati, Schebler opened the 2016 season as the left-handed side of a platoon in left field with Adam Duvall, but struggled offensively in the opening month. Schebler hit .188 in his first 69 plate appearances, while only making 13 starts in Cincinnati's 31 games. With Duvall having seized the left field job, Schebler was optioned to Triple-A Louisville on May 8 to gain more playing time.

On August 1, the Reds traded outfielder Jay Bruce to the Mets, and Schebler, hitting well in Louisville, got the first opportunity to replace Bruce. In 75 games with the Bats, Schebler hit .311 with 13 HR and 43 RBI, including a game where he hit for the cycle, while also winning the International League's Player of the Month honors for July. On August 2, Schebler was recalled to Cincinnati. That night, he hit a 3-run walk off home run against the St. Louis Cardinals. Following his return to Cincinnati, in the team's final 58 games, Schebler made 51 starts, hitting .290 with 8 home runs and 32 RBI, and ended the 2016 season as a potential starting right fielder going forward. He finished his first season with the Reds hitting .265 with 9 home runs and 40 RBI.

In 2017, Schebler played the majority of the season with the Reds, hitting 30 home runs with 67 RBIs. Those totals, along with 141 games played, 25 doubles, and 125 strikeouts were career highs for him. Schebler hit his first major league grand slam against Chris Flexen of the New York Mets on August 29, 2017. Schebler struggled mightily in 2019, albeit in limited time in the majors as he hit .123 in 95 plate appearances. On April 10, he and teammates Matt Kemp and Eugenio Suarez hit consecutive home runs.

On July 19, 2020, Schebler was designated for assignment by the Reds, prior to the start of the shortened 2020 season.

=== Atlanta Braves ===
On July 24, 2020, Schebler was traded to the Atlanta Braves in exchange for cash considerations. Schebler was added to Atlanta's active roster five days later. He was designated for assignment on August 6 after receiving only one at-bat for the team, a pinch-hit groundout. Schebler accepted an assignment to the team's alternate training site on August 13. Schebler became a free agent on November 2.

=== Los Angeles Angels ===
On November 21, 2020, Schebler signed a minor league contract with the Los Angeles Angels organization. On April 16, 2021, Schebler was selected to the 40-man roster to take the roster spot of Jon Jay. On May 4, Schebler was designated for assignment after notching just four hits in 27 plate appearances. On May 8, Schebler was sent outright to the Salt Lake Bees. On June 28, Schebler's contract was selected by the Angels. Schebler went 1-for-7 in 3 games before he was designated for assignment again on July 3. He was again outrighted to Salt Lake on July 6. In total, Schebler played 14 games for the Angels, batting .147 with three doubles being his only extra base hits. On October 6, 2021, Schebler elected free agency.

=== Colorado Rockies ===
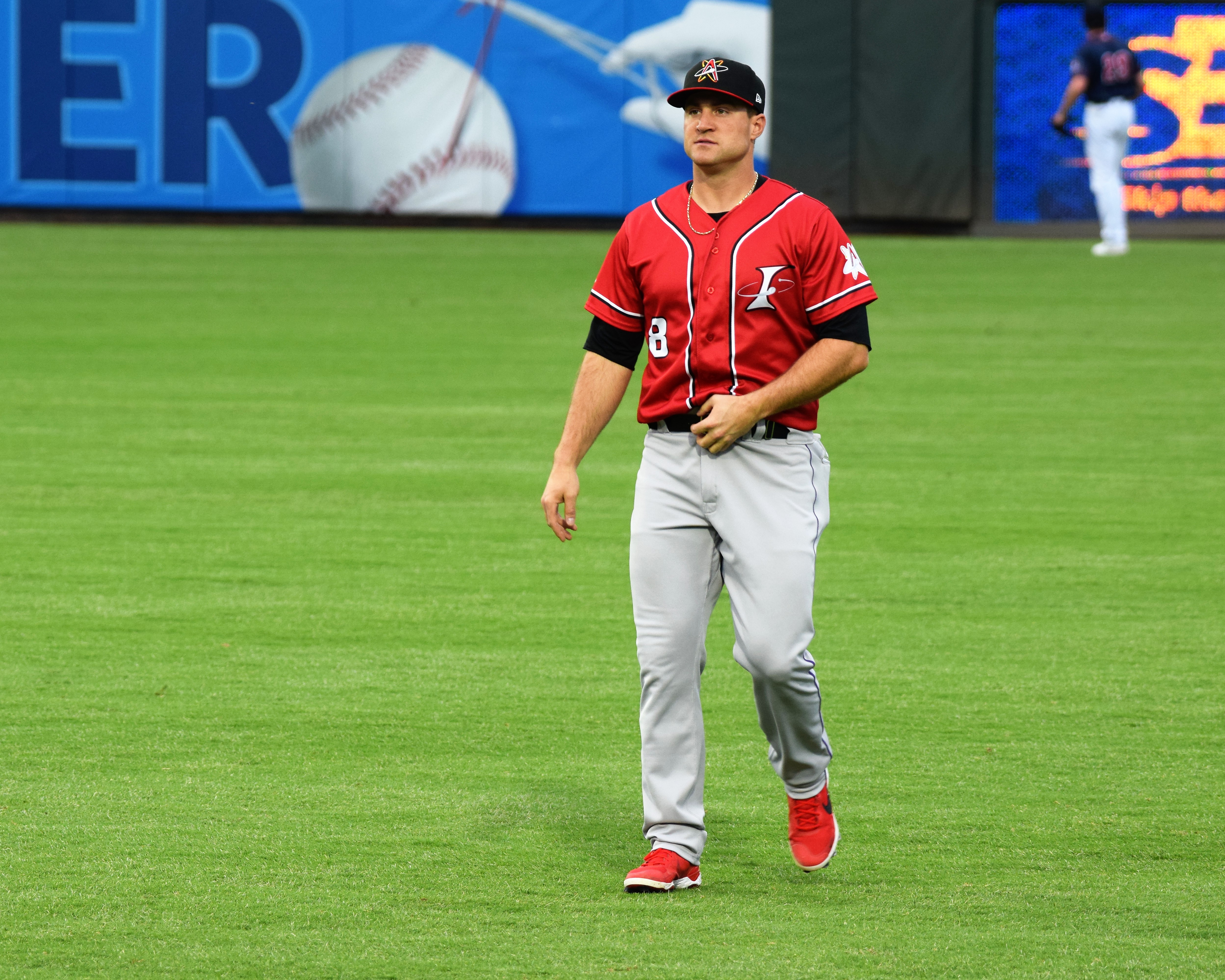
Schebler with the Albuquerque Isotopes in 2022

On March 12, 2022, Schebler signed a minor league contract with the Colorado Rockies. In 57 games for the Triple–A Albuquerque Isotopes, he hit .243/.307/.411 with 7 home runs and 28 RBI. Schebler was released by the Rockies on July 4.

Schebler retired from professional baseball in 2023. In August 2023, he joined the OnBase Group as the Director of Partnerships.
