= Alex Blandino =

American baseball player (born 1992)

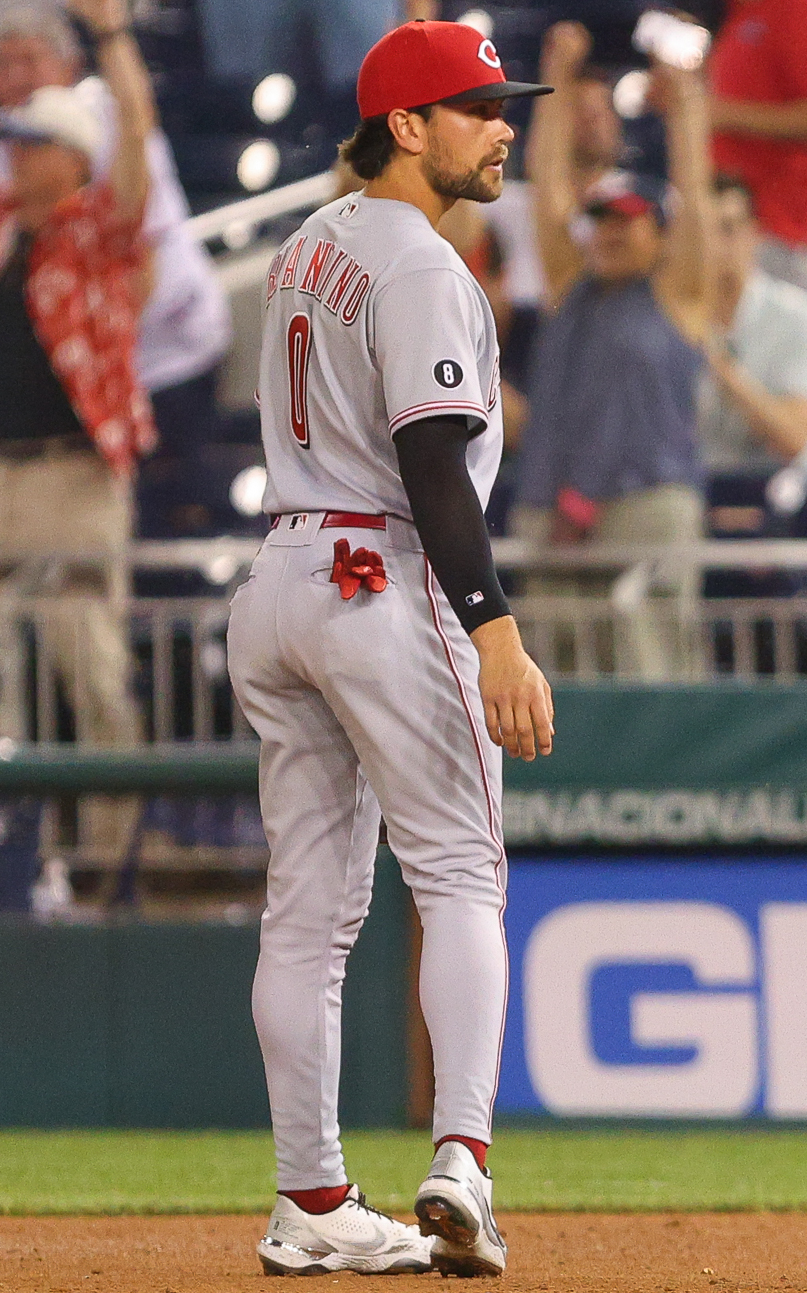
- Blandino with the Reds in 2021
- Utility player / Pitcher
- Born: November 6, 1992 (age 33); Palo Alto, California, U.S.
- Batted: Right Threw: Right

MLB debut
- April 10, 2018, for the Cincinnati Reds

Last MLB appearance
- June 4, 2021, for the Cincinnati Reds

MLB statistics
- Batting average: .226
- Home runs: 2
- Runs batted in: 16
- Stats at Baseball Reference

Teams
- Cincinnati Reds (2018–2019, 2021)

Alessandre Blandino (born November 6, 1992) is an American former professional baseball pitcher and infielder. He played college baseball at Stanford and was drafted by the Cincinnati Reds in the first round of the 2014 Major League Baseball draft. He has played for the Nicaragua national baseball team.

== Amateur career ==
Blandino was drafted by the Oakland Athletics in the 38th round of the 2011 Major League Baseball draft out of St. Francis High School in Mountain View, California. He did not sign and attended Stanford University. He played college baseball for the Stanford Cardinal from 2012 to 2014, hitting .292/.372/.504 with 27 home runs in 157 games. After his freshman and sophomore seasons, he played collegiate summer baseball for the Yarmouth–Dennis Red Sox of the Cape Cod Baseball League, batting .323 in 2012 and .319 in 2013, and in both seasons was named the starting third baseman for the East Division All-Star team.

== Professional career ==
=== Cincinnati Reds (first stint) ===
The Cincinnati Reds drafted Blandino in the first round, with the 29th overall selection, of the 2014 Major League Baseball draft. He signed and was assigned to the Billings Mustangs, and after batting .309 with four home runs, 16 RBIs, and a .939 OPS in 29 games, was promoted to the Dayton Dragons, where he finished the season, batting .261 with four home runs and 16 RBIs in 34 games. In 2015, he played for both the Daytona Tortugas and the Pensacola Blue Wahoos, posting a combined .278 batting average with ten home runs and 53 RBIs, and 2016 with Pensacola, batting .232 with eight home runs and 37 RBIs. Blandino spent 2017 with Pensacola and the Louisville Bats, slashing a combined .265/.382/.453 with 12 home runs and 51 RBIs in 125 total games between both teams. Blandino played for the Nicaraguan national baseball team in the 2017 World Baseball Classic Qualifier. On November 20, 2017, the Reds added Blandino to their 40-man roster to protect him from the Rule 5 draft.

Blandino made his major league debut with the Reds on April 10, 2018, and hit his first major league home run on May 1, off Milwaukee Brewers pitcher Jacob Barnes. On July 11, he appeared as a pitcher in the 8th inning of a blowout loss against the Cleveland Indians. He struck out two of the four batters he faced, throwing a 90-mile-per-hour (140 km/h) fastball and a 67 miles per hour (108 km/h) knuckleball. Blandino tore his anterior cruciate ligament on July 20, and required surgery to repair it that ended his season.

In 2019 for Cincinnati, Blandino appeared in 23 games, slashing .250/.420/.361 with one home run and three RBIs, and did not appear in a major league game in the 2020 season, spending the season at the alternate training site.

Blandino pitched again for Cincinnati on April 28, 2021, in the bottom of the eighth inning against the Los Angeles Dodgers, retiring the one batter he faced on a flyout. The Reds had previously given up 6 runs in the inning, putting them behind, 8–0, when Blandino appeared to close out the inning. On July 17, Blandino was placed on the 60-day injured list with a fractured right hand. He was activated off of the injured list in mid-August and optioned to Triple-A Louisville. Blandino was outrighted off of the 40-man roster on November 4. He elected free agency on November 8.

=== San Francisco Giants ===
On December 10, 2021, Blandino signed a minor league contract with the San Francisco Giants. In 24 games for the Triple–A Sacramento River Cats, he hit .183/.309/.281 with one home run and 9 RBI.

=== Seattle Mariners ===
On May 14, 2022, Blandino was traded by the Giants to the Seattle Mariners in exchange for Stuart Fairchild. He played in 47 games for the Triple–A Tacoma Rainiers, batting .203/.399/.341 with 3 home runs, 22 RBI, and 7 stolen bases. Blandino was released by the Mariners organization on August 1.

=== Cincinnati Reds (second stint) ===
On November 22, 2023, Blandino signed a minor league contract with the Reds. After signing, it was revealed that Blandino was converting to a knuckleball pitcher. On November 6, 2024, he elected free agency.

== International career ==
Born in the United States, Blandino is of Nicaraguan descent through his father. He played for the Nicaragua national baseball team at the 2023 World Baseball Classic.
