= Curt Casali =

American baseball player (born 1988)

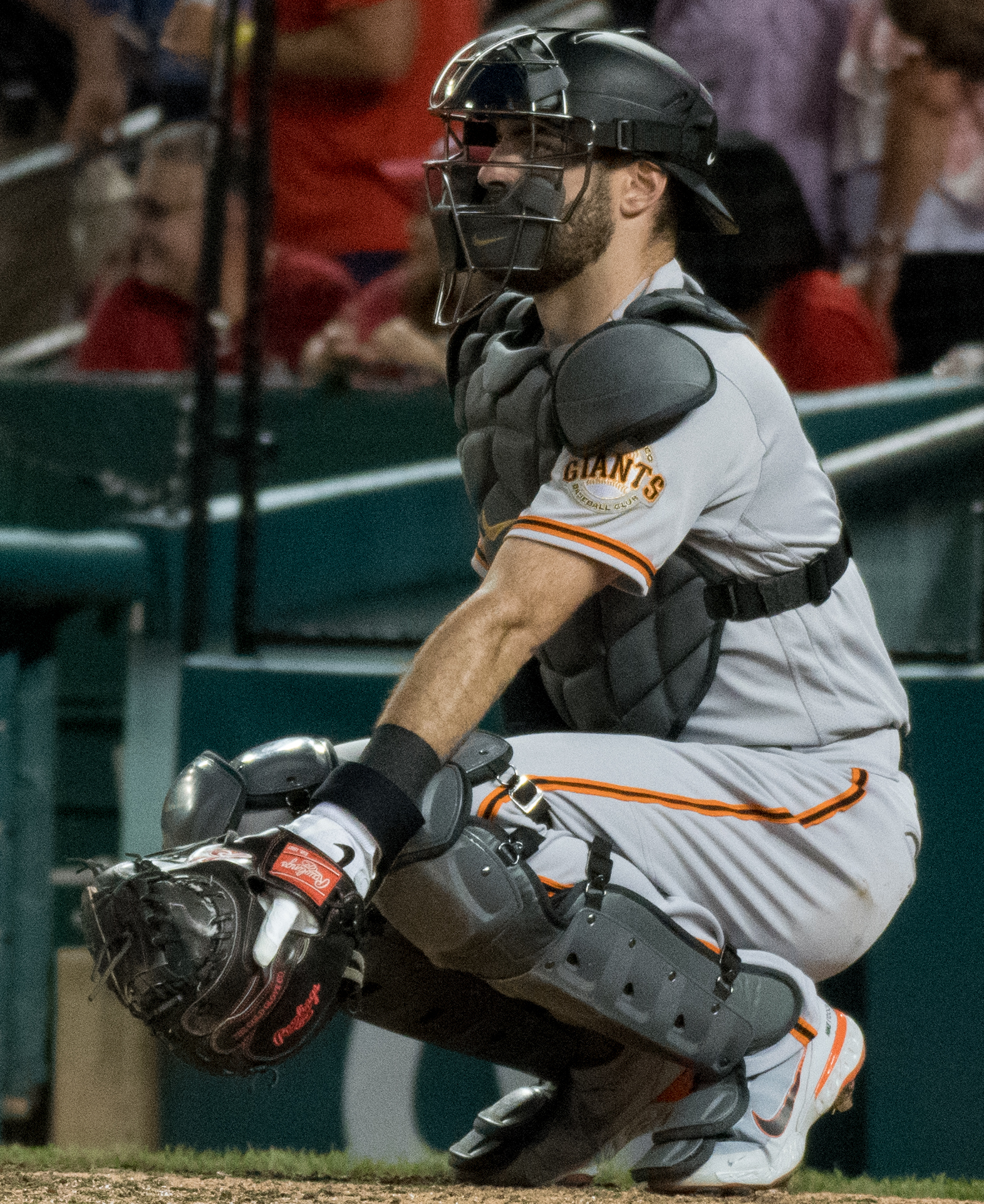
- Casali with the San Francisco Giants in 2021
- Catcher
- Born: November 9, 1988 (age 38); Walnut Creek, California, U.S.
- Batted: Right Threw: Right

MLB debut
- July 18, 2014, for the Tampa Bay Rays

Last MLB appearance
- September 29, 2024, for the San Francisco Giants

MLB statistics
- Batting average: .218
- Home runs: 48
- Runs batted in: 162
- Stats at Baseball Reference

Teams
- Tampa Bay Rays (2014–2017); Cincinnati Reds (2018–2020); San Francisco Giants (2021–2022); Seattle Mariners (2022); Cincinnati Reds (2023); San Francisco Giants (2024)

Curtis Michael Casali (born November 9, 1988), is an American former professional baseball catcher. He played in Major League Baseball (MLB) for the Tampa Bay Rays, Cincinnati Reds, San Francisco Giants, and Seattle Mariners. Casali played college baseball at Vanderbilt University, and was selected by the Detroit Tigers in the 10th round of the 2011 MLB draft. He made his MLB debut in 2014 with the Rays.

== Early life ==
Casali was born in Walnut Creek, California, but raised in New Canaan, Connecticut. He attended New Canaan High School. He starred in baseball (batting .427 for the team) as well as basketball, and in football as a quarterback, leading the team to a state championship. Casali earned first-team All-State honors in football and baseball, and was named the second-best prospect from Connecticut/Rhode Island in the June 2007 baseball draft.

== College career ==
Casali played college baseball at Vanderbilt University. During his four years at Vanderbilt, he had a .316 batting average, a .430 on-base percentage, a .502 slugging percentage, 27 home runs, and 167 runs batted in (RBIs). Casali made it to the College World Series semifinals in 2011 with Vanderbilt, but the team was eliminated by Florida. In 2008, he played collegiate summer baseball with the Hyannis Mets of the Cape Cod Baseball League, and he returned to the league in 2010 to play for the Cotuit Kettleers.

== Professional career ==
=== Detroit Tigers (2011–2012) ===
==== Minor leagues ====
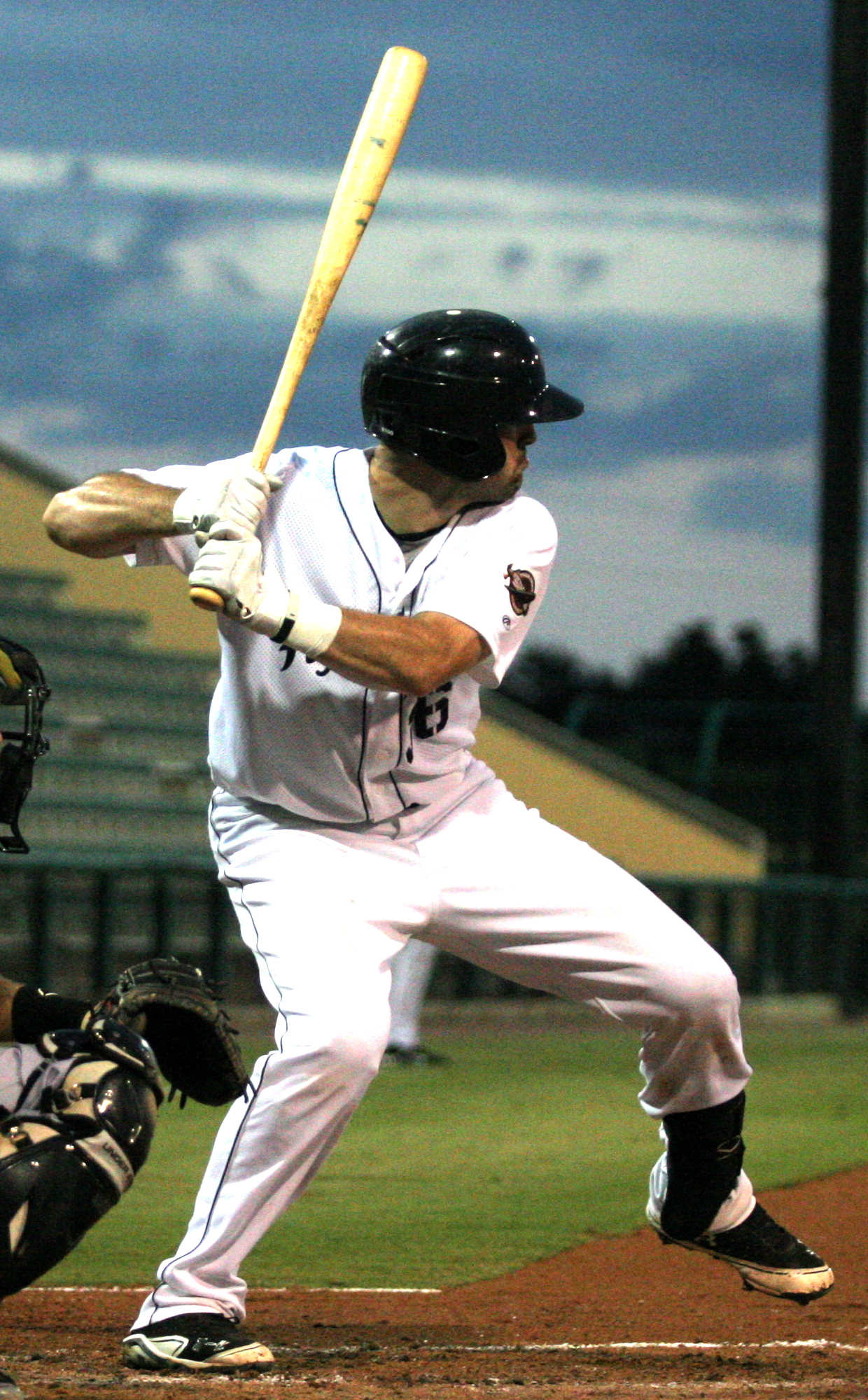
Casali batting for the Lakeland Flying Tigers in 2012

The Detroit Tigers selected Casali in the 10th round of the 2011 Major League Baseball draft, 317th overall, and he signed on July 1, 2011, for a $40,000 signing bonus. Baseball America' wrote that the Tommy John surgery that he had in 2009 while in college reduced his formerly plus arm strength, but that he was still a good defensive catcher with a good approach at the plate. He made his professional debut that season for the short season Low–A Connecticut Tigers of the New York-Pennsylvania League, batting .278/.409/.417 with one home run and two RBI in 26 at bats. He then played for the Single–A West Michigan Whitecaps of the Midwest League, batting .227/.344/.400 with 2 home runs and 14 RBI in 75 at bats. Between the two teams, he had a low strikeout rate, at 10.3%.

In 2012 he played for West Michigan and, starting in late June, the High–A Lakeland Flying Tigers. Casali batted a combined .270/.365/.427 with 9 home runs and 43 RBI in 330 at bats. He helped the Flying Tigers to their first Florida State League title in 20 years. He was a 2012 MiLB Organization All Star. Baseball America ranked him as the organization's 23rd-best prospect.

=== Tampa Bay Rays (2013–2018) ===
On March 25, 2013, the Tigers traded Casali to the Tampa Bay Rays in exchange for pitcher Kyle Lobstein. The Rays assigned him to the High–A Charlotte Stone Crabs, and then promoted him to the Double–A Montgomery Biscuits. With Charlotte, he batted .267/.342/.406 in 165 at bats and was an FSL Mid-Season All-Star. In 35 games with Montgomery, Casali hit .383 with a .483 on-base percentage and .600 slugging percentage, with five home runs. Overall, he hit .317/.405/.489 and 10 home runs. He was a 2013 MiLB Organization All Star.

In 2014, he was invited to spring training by the Rays. Casali returned to Montgomery to start the 2014 season, and batted .314/.500/.429 in 70 at bats. He was promoted to the Triple–A Durham Bulls in May, and for them he batted .237/.335/.359 in 156 at bats.

==== Major leagues ====
On July 18, 2014, Casali played his first major league game against the Minnesota Twins. He recorded a hit in his first at bat and a run later in the inning. He batted .167 in 72 at bats.

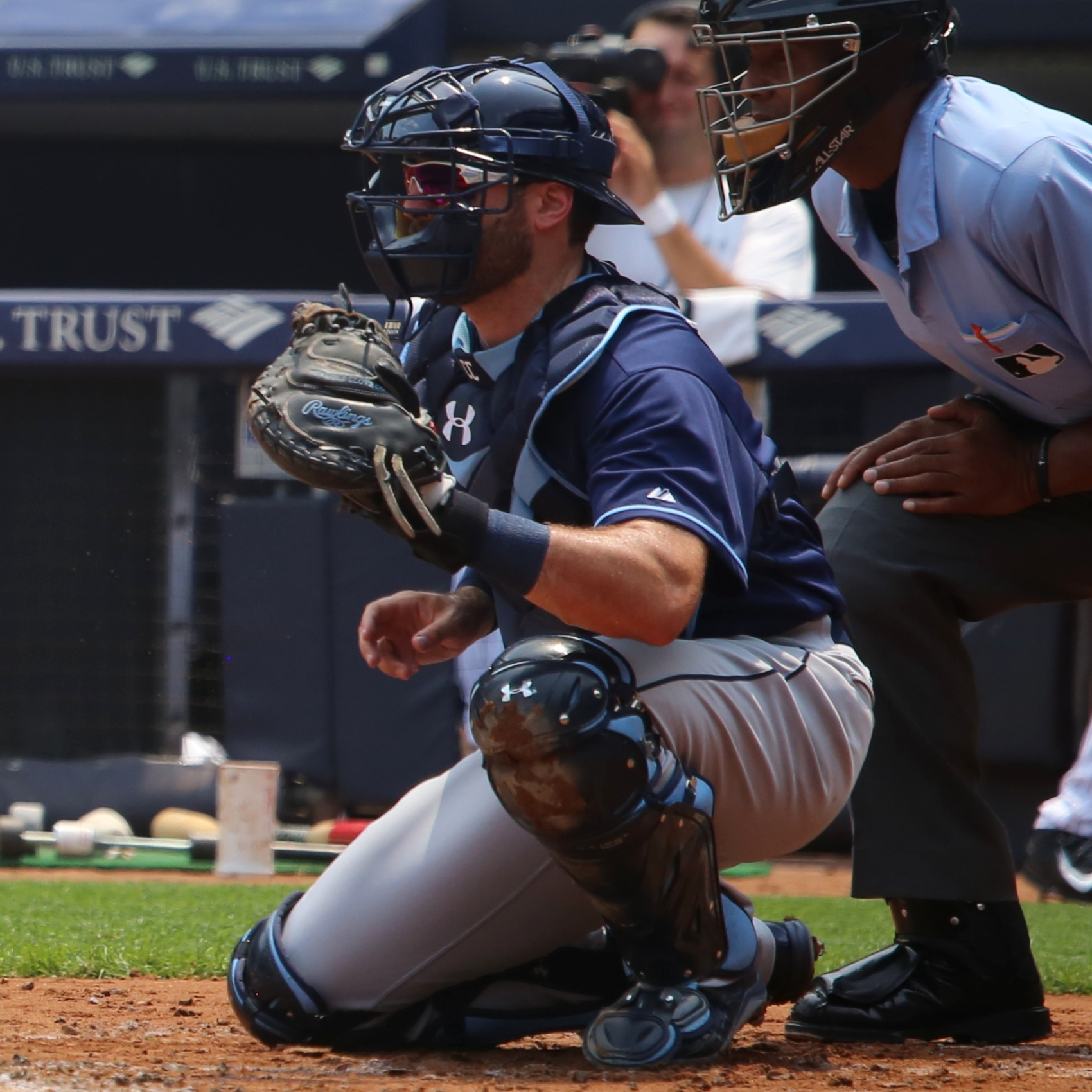
Casali with the Tampa Bay Rays in 2015

On July 28, 2015, Casali hit two home runs in one game against the Detroit Tigers. One night later, Casali repeated the feat by hitting two homers against former teammate and fellow Vanderbilt alum David Price. In 2015 with Tampa Bay he batted .238/.304/.594 with a career-high 10 home runs and 18 RBI in 101 at bats. With Durham, he batted .205/.326/.348 in 112 at bats.

Casali opened the 2016 season in a platoon with Hank Conger. For Tampa Bay, he caught 36% of attempted basestealers, giving up 25 steals and catching 14 baserunners. Casali hit .169 before being optioned to the Durham Bulls on August 4, 2016, for whom he batted .254/.407/.365 in 63 at bats.

He played most of 2017 for Durham, batting .263/.351/.347 in 300 at bats. In nine at bats for Tampa Bay, Casali had three hits, including a home run. He was removed from the 40–man roster and outrighted to Triple-A on November 6, 2017, before elected free agency later that day.

On November 28, 2017, the Los Angeles Angels signed Casali to a minor league contract. However, the Angels released him on January 16, 2018.

Two days later, Casali signed a minor league contract with the Texas Rangers. The Rangers released Casali on March 21, 2018.

On March 21, 2018, Casali signed a minor league contract with the Tampa Bay Rays. Playing for the Triple–A Durham Bulls, he hit .274/.327/.453 in 95 at–bats.

=== Cincinnati Reds (2018–2020) ===
On May 31, 2018, Casali was traded to the Cincinnati Reds for cash. In July he injured his right knee, and was expected to be sidelined for three to four weeks. In 2018, he batted .293/.355/.450 with 4 home runs and 16 RBI in 140 at bats.

In 2019, he batted .251/.331/.411 with 8 home runs and a career-high 32 RBI in 207 at bats. He had the best range factor/9 innings in the National League among catchers (10.76). Casali also had 14 at bats with the Triple–A Louisville Bats.

In 2020, he batted .224/.366/.500 with 6 home runs and 8 RBI in 76 at bats. He had the 3rd-best range factor/9 innings in the National League among catchers (11.30). On December 2, 2020, Casali was nontendered by the Reds.

=== San Francisco Giants (2021–2022) ===
On January 4, 2021, Casali signed a one-year, $1.5 million contract with the San Francisco Giants, to serve as the primary backup to catcher Buster Posey. During April 2021, Casali caught team shutouts in five consecutive starts (non-consecutive games). He became just the fifth catcher since 1900 with at least five straight team shutouts in his starts, and the first to do so with five different starting pitchers. On June 17, in a game against the Arizona Diamondbacks, Casali recorded his first career triple off of D’Backs reliever Riley Smith. In the game, Casali also notched his first Giants homer, a 2-run shot off of D’Backs starter Zac Gallen in a game in which he went 3-for-5 with 4 RBIs.

In the 2021 regular season, Casali batted .210/.313/.350 with 11 doubles and 26 walks (career highs), and 5 home runs and 26 RBI in 200 at bats over 77 games.

On March 22, 2022, Casali signed a $2.6 million contract with the Giants, avoiding salary arbitration.

=== Seattle Mariners (2022) ===
On August 2, 2022, Casali and Matthew Boyd were traded to the Seattle Mariners in exchange for Michael Stryffeler and Andy Thomas. In 16 games for Seattle, he went 5-for-40 (.125) with one home run and three RBI.

=== Second stint with Cincinnati Reds (2023) ===
On December 22, 2022, Casali signed a one-year, $3.25 million contract with the Cincinnati Reds. he played in 40 games for Cincinnati in 2023, batting .175/.290/.200 with no home runs and six RBI. Casali became a free agent following the season.

=== Chicago Cubs (2024) ===
On February 13, 2024, Casali signed a minor league contract with the Miami Marlins. He was released on March 26 before signing with the Chicago Cubs on minor league contract on March 29. In 23 games for the Triple–A Iowa Cubs, Casali batted .362/.489/.551 with two home runs and 11 RBI. On May 14, he was released by the Cubs organization.

=== Second stint with San Francisco Giants (2024) ===
On May 15, 2024, Casali signed a one-year, major league contract with the San Francisco Giants. In 41 games for San Francisco, Casali batted .194/.293/.250 with one home run and eight RBI.

=== Atlanta Braves (2025) ===
On January 17, 2025, Casali signed a minor league contract with the Atlanta Braves. He was released prior to the start of the season on March 17.

== Executive career ==
On October 4, 2025, it was announced that Casali had retired as a player and taken a job in the Cincinnati Reds front office. On December 5, Buster Posey announced the hiring of Casali as an Advisor to Baseball Operations for the San Francisco Giants.

== Records ==
- Giants franchise record for consecutive shutouts caught: 5
- MLB record (tie) for consecutive shutouts caught in the live-ball era: 5
- Second all-time (tie) for MLB modern era consecutive shutouts caught: 5 (record is 6)

== See also ==
- List of baseball players who underwent Tommy John surgery
