= 2018 Chicago White Sox season =

2018 Chicago White Sox
- League: American League
- Division: Central
- Ballpark: Guaranteed Rate Field
- City: Chicago
- Record: 62–100 (.383)
- Divisional place: 4th
- Owners: Jerry Reinsdorf
- General managers: Rick Hahn
- Managers: Rick Renteria
- Television: NBC Sports Chicago; NBC Sports Chicago+ WGN-TV (Jason Benetti, Ken Harrelson, Steve Stone, Tom Paciorek)
- Radio: WGN-AM; Chicago White Sox Radio Network (Ed Farmer, Jason Benetti, Darrin Jackson); WRTO-AM (Spanish) (Hector Molina, Billy Russo)
- Stats: ESPN.com; Baseball Reference

The 2018 Chicago White Sox season was the club's 119th season in Chicago and 118th in the American League. It marked the second season with Rick Renteria as manager of the Sox. The Sox played their home games at Guaranteed Rate Field. After losing to the Red Sox on August 30 they clinched their sixth consecutive losing season and their 11th year without a postseason spot. They began their season on March 29 against the Kansas City Royals and finished the season on September 30 against the Minnesota Twins.

At 62–100, the White Sox finished four games ahead of the last-place Royals, had the third worst record in the league, and 29 games behind the Cleveland Indians; it was their first 100-loss season since 1970.

It was the final season for long time PBP announcer Ken Harrelson who retired before the end of the season, and the second of the last for broadcasts on long time FTA broadcaster WGN-TV, the 2018–19 offseason was when it was announced that NBC Sports Chicago, the team's cable partner, will become the de facto official station of the team effective Opening Day 2020 with more game broadcasts there. No plans are yet to be made regarding the team's future free-to-air television broadcasts, through.

== Offseason ==
=== Transactions ===
- October 2, 2017, Cody Asche and Jean Machi granted free agency.
- October 6, 2017, Rob Brantly granted free agency.
- October 7, 2017, David Holmberg granted free agency.
- October 9, 2017, Rymer Liriano and Chris Volstad granted free agency.
- November 2, 2017, Mike Pelfrey and Geovany Soto granted free agency.
- November 3, 2017, White Sox acquired outfielder Daniel Palka off waivers from the Minnesota Twins.
- November 6, 2017. Jason Bourgeois, Steve Johnson, Tyler Ladendorf, Matt Purke and Scott Snodgress granted free agency.
- November 16, 2017, White Sox traded international bonus slot money to the Seattle Mariners for pitcher Thyago Vieira.
- November 18, 2017, White Sox signed pitcher Dustin Antolin as a free agent.
- December 1, 2017, White Sox signed free agent catcher Welington Castillo to a two-year, $15 million contract, including a club option for 2020. Al Alburquerque, Alen Hanson, Jake Petricka and Zach Putnam granted free agency.
- December 22, 2017, White Sox selected pitcher José Ruiz off of waivers from the San Diego Padres.
- January 4, 2018, as part of a 3-team trade, White Sox traded infielder Jake Peter (minors) to the Los Angeles Dodgers. The Sox received relief pitcher Luis Avilán and cash from the Los Angeles Dodgers and relief pitcher Joakim Soria and cash from the Kansas City Royals. In addition, the Los Angeles Dodgers sent infielder Erick Mejia (minors) and pitcher Trevor Oaks (minors) to the Kansas City Royals; and the Kansas City Royals sent pitcher Scott Alexander to the Los Angeles Dodgers.
- January 10, 2018, White Sox acquire minor league infielder José Rondón via trade from the San Diego Padres for cash.
- January 11, 2018, White Sox re-acquired pitcher Miguel González via free agency for a one-year deal.
  Outfielder Jacob May was designated for assignment.
- January 16, 2018, White Sox signed pitcher Gonzalez Germen to a minor league contract.
- January 22, 2018, White Sox signed pitchers TJ House, Rob Scahill and Chris Volstad as free agents.
- January 24, 2018, pitcher Donn Roach was signed as a free agent.
- January 25, 2018, White Sox signed pitcher Xavier Cedeño to a minor league contract.
- January 29, 2018, infielder Dean Anna was signed as a free agent.
- January 31, 2018, pitcher Jeanmar Gómez was signed as a free agent.
- February 8, 2018, signed infielder Jake Elmore and pitcher Bruce Rondón as free agents.
- February 14, 2018, pitcher Hector Santiago was signed as a free agent to a minor league contract.

== Spring training ==
=== Transactions ===
- March 4, 2018, White Sox signed pitcher Robbie Ross Jr. as a free agent.
- March 9, 2018, White Sox released Willy García.

=== Spring training game log ===
2018 White Sox Spring Training Game Log: 17–12 (Home: 9–5; Away: 8–7)
February 4–2 (Home: 3–0; Road 1–2)

#	Date	Opponent	Time (CT)	Score	Win	Loss	Save	Record	Attendance	Streak/ Box
1	February 23	@ Dodgers	2:05 pm	5–13	Lee (1–0)	**Danish** (0–1)	–	0–1	6,813	L1
2	February 24	@ Mariners #	2:10 pm	5–3	**Gómez** (1–0)	Morin (0–1)	**Volstad** (1)	1–1	5,107	W1
3	February 25	Reds (SS)	2:05 pm	8–5	**Scahill** (1–0)	Worley (0–1)	**Walsh** (1)	2–1	2,703	W2
4	February 26	Athletics	2:05 pm	7–6	**Kopech** (1–0)	Graveman (0–1)	**Danish** (1)	3–1	2,826	W3
5	February 27	@ Cubs	2:05 pm	5–6	Lester (1–0)	**Fulmer** (0–1)	De La Cruz (1)	3–2	10,769	L1
6	February 28	Rangers	2:05 pm	5–4	**Cease** (1–0)	Sampson (0–1)	–	4–2	2,360	W1

March: 13–10 (Home: 6–5; Away: 7–5)

#	Date	Opponent	Time (CT)	Score	Win	Loss	Save	Record	Attendance	Streak/ Box
7	March 1	@ Reds	2:05 pm	7–8	Worley (1–1)	**Ruiz** (0–1)	–	4–3	2,271	L1
8	March 2	Dodgers #	2:05 pm	6–7	Copping (1–0)	**Walsh** (0–1)	Istler (1)	4–4	7,423	L2
9	March 3	@ Royals #	2:05 pm	9–5	**Scahill** (2–0)	Flynn (1–1)	**Stephens** (1)	5–4	5,793	W1
10	March 4	Padres (SS)	2:05 pm	6–7	Lucchesi (1–0)	**Fulmer** (0–2)	Aro (1)	5–5	3,777	L1
11	March 5	@ Athletics #	2:05 pm	9–9	–	–	–	5–5	4,302	T1
12	March 6	Brewers	2:05 pm	6–4	**Dunning** (1–0)	Williams (0–1)	**Clark** (1)	6–5	3,954	W1
13	March 7	Reds	2:05 pm	14–12	**Jones** (1–0)	Stephens (0–1)	**Goldberg** (1)	7–5	3,586	W2
14	March 8	@ Rangers	2:05 pm	4–5	Barnette (2–0)	**Stephens** (0–1)	Scott (1)	7–6	3,739	L1
15	March 8	Royals	2:05 pm	0–12	Duffy (1–0)	**Kopech** (1–1)	–	7–7	3,419	L2
16	March 9	@ Padres	2:10 pm	0–2	Richard (1–1)	**Fulmer** (0–3)	Makita (1)	7–8	5,331	L3
17	March 10	@ Cubs (SS)	2:05 pm	4–4	–	–	–	7–8	15,508	T1
18	March 11	Diamondbacks	3:05 pm	6–5	**López** (1–0)	Corbin (0–1)	**Clark** (2)	8–8	7,289	W1
19	March 12	@ Mariners	8:40 pm	4–2	**Cease** (2–0)	Gonzales (0–1)	**Clarkin** (1)	9–8	7,287	W2
20	March 14	@ Brewers	3:05 pm	3–11	Chacín (2–1)	**Fulmer** (0–4)	–	9–9	5,497	L1
21	March 15	@ Angels (SS) #	8:10 pm	7–2	**Giolito** (1–0)	Bridwell (0–1)	–	10–9	6,083	W1
22	March 16	Cubs	3:05 pm	3–6	Darvish (2–0)	**López** (1–1)	Hancock (2)	10–10	13,044	L1
23	March 17	Dodgers #	3:05 pm	5–2	**González** (1–0)	Ryu (1–1)	**Scahill** (1)	11–10	13,199	W1
24	March 18	@ Athletics #	3:05 pm	0–14	Luzardo (1–0)	**Shields** (0–1)	–	11–11	6,227	L1
25	March 19	@ Diamondbacks	3:10 pm	15–2	**Fulmer** (1–4)	Suárez (1–1)	–	12–11	10,299	W1
26	March 20	Rangers	3:05 pm	10–0	**Giolito** (2–0)	Fister (0–1)	–	13–11	4,561	W2
27	March 21	Padres	3:05 pm	3–4	Perdomo (1–2)	**López** (1–2)	Maton (2)	13–12	4,727	L1
28	March 22	@ Diamondbacks	8:40 pm	3–1	**González** (2–0)	Walker (1–1)	**Ross Jr.** (1)	14–12	8,576	W1
29	March 23	Mariners #	3:05 pm	5–5	–	–	–	14–12	6,173	T1
30	March 24	@ Dodgers #	2:05 pm	7–3	**Santiago** (1–0)	Wood (2–1)	–	15–12	13,160	W1
31	March 25	Brewers	2:05 pm	16–1	**Volstad** (1–0)	Ramirez (0–1)	–	16–12	7,437	W2
32	March 26	@ Knights	5:05 pm	9–5	**López** (2–2)	Roach (0–1)	–	17–12	7,237	W3

Legend: = Win = Loss = Cancelled/Tie
Bold = White Sox team member, SS=Spilt Squad #=Game Was Not Televised In the Chicago Market

== Regular season ==
=== Highlights ===
- March 28, 2018: White Sox trade international bonus slot money to the Philadelphia Phillies for pitcher Ricardo Pinto. Sold Dean Anna to the Philadelphia Phillies.
- April 9, 2018: A reported 947 people attended the White Sox home game against the Tampa Bay Rays, which was played in cold weather, although the paid attendance announced during the game was 10,377.
- April 19, 2018: White Sox sold Tyler Saladino to the Milwaukee Brewers and traded a player to be named or cash to the Oakland Athletics for Trayce Thompson.
- April 27, 2018: The Sox traded a player to be named to the Pittsburgh Pirates and received Todd Cunningham.
- May 10, 2018: Sox Release Jorge Rondón.
- May 12, 2018: White Sox sign Johnny Giavotella as a free agent.
- May 15, 2018: Sox release Todd Cunningham.
- May 20, 2018: White Sox sign Michael Saunders as a free agent.
- May 23, 2018: White Sox sign Alex Presley as a free agent.
- May 24, 2018: Sox catcher Welington Castillo was suspended for 80 games for violating the league's performance-enhancing drug policy. White Sox select Dustin Garneau off waivers from the Oakland Athletics.
- May 28, 2018: Sox sign Jairo Labourt as a free agent.
- June 3, 2018: White Sox sell Brad Goldberg to the Arizona Diamondbacks.
- June 9. 2018: Sox release Robbie Ross Jr.
- June 12, 2018: White Sox release TJ House.
- June 13, 2018: Chris Beck was claimed off waivers by the New York Mets.
- June 21, 2018: Sox release Michael Saunders.
- June 22, 2018: Sox release Johnny Giavotella.
- June 29, 2018: Sox release Alex Presley.
- June 30, 2018: Sox release Jairo Labourt.
- July 5, 2018: Sox release Donn Roach.
- July 9, 2018: White Sox claim Ryan LaMarre off waivers from the Minnesota Twins.
- July 17, 2018: Bruce Rondón is granted free agency.
- July 20, 2018: Sox sign Mauricio Cabrera as a free agent.
- July 25, 2018: Sox sign Asher Wojciechowski as a free agent.
- July 26, 2018: White Sox trade Joakim Soria and cash to the Milwaukee Brewers for Kodi Medeiros (minors) and Wilber Perez (minors).
- July 28, 2018: Sox release Jacob May.
- July 31, 2018: Sox release Chris Volstad.

=== Season standings ===
==== American League Central ====
AL Central
Team	W	L	Pct.	GB	Home	Road
Cleveland Indians	91	71	.562	—	49‍–‍32	42‍–‍39
Minnesota Twins	78	84	.481	13	49‍–‍32	29‍–‍52
Detroit Tigers	64	98	.395	27	38‍–‍43	26‍–‍55
Chicago White Sox	62	100	.383	29	30‍–‍51	32‍–‍49
Kansas City Royals	58	104	.358	33	32‍–‍49	26‍–‍55

==== American League Wild Card ====
Division leaders
Team	W	L	Pct.
Boston Red Sox	108	54	.667
Houston Astros	103	59	.636
Cleveland Indians	91	71	.562

Wild Card teams (Top 2 teams qualify for postseason)
Team	W	L	Pct.	GB
New York Yankees	100	62	.617	+3
Oakland Athletics	97	65	.599	—
Tampa Bay Rays	90	72	.556	7
Seattle Mariners	89	73	.549	8
Los Angeles Angels	80	82	.494	17
Minnesota Twins	78	84	.481	19
Toronto Blue Jays	73	89	.451	24
Texas Rangers	67	95	.414	30
Detroit Tigers	64	98	.395	33
Chicago White Sox	62	100	.383	35
Kansas City Royals	58	104	.358	39
Baltimore Orioles	47	115	.290	50

==== Record against opponents ====
2018 American League record Source: MLB Standings Grid – 2018
Team	BAL	BOS	CWS	CLE	DET	HOU	KC	LAA	MIN	NYY	OAK	SEA	TB	TEX	TOR	NL
Baltimore	—	3–16	3–4	2–5	2–4	1–6	2–4	1–5	1–6	7–12	1–5	1–6	8–11	3–4	5–14	7–13
Boston	16–3	—	3–4	3–4	4–2	3–4	5–1	6–0	4–3	10–9	2–4	4–3	11–8	6–1	15–4	16–4
Chicago	4–3	4–3	—	5–14	7–12	0–7	11–8	2–5	7–12	2–4	2–5	2–4	4–2	4–3	2–4	6–14
Cleveland	5–2	4–3	14–5	—	13–6	3–4	12–7	3–3	10–9	2–5	2–4	2–5	2–4	4–2	3–4	12–8
Detroit	4–2	2–4	12–7	6–13	—	1–5	8–11	3–4	7–12	3–4	0–7	3–4	2–4	3–4	4–3	6–14
Houston	6–1	4–3	7–0	4–3	5–1	—	5–1	13–6	4–2	2–5	12–7	9–10	3–4	12–7	4–2	13–7
Kansas City	4–2	1–5	8–11	7–12	11–8	1–5	—	1–6	10–9	2–5	2–5	1–5	0–7	2–5	2–5	6–14
Los Angeles	5–1	0–6	5–2	3–3	4–3	6–13	6–1	—	4–3	1–5	10–9	8–11	1–6	13–6	4–3	10–10
Minnesota	6–1	3–4	12–7	9–10	12–7	2–4	9–10	3–4	—	2–5	2–5	1–5	3–4	2–4	4–2	8–12
New York	12–7	9–10	4–2	5–2	4–3	5–2	5–2	5–1	5–2	—	3–3	5–1	10–9	4–3	13–6	11–9
Oakland	5–1	4–2	5–2	4–2	7–0	7–12	5–2	9–10	5–2	3–3	—	9–10	2–5	13–6	7–0	12–8
Seattle	6–1	3–4	4–2	5–2	4–3	10–9	5–1	11–8	5–1	1–5	10–9	—	6–1	10–9	3–4	6–14
Tampa Bay	11–8	8–11	2–4	4–2	4–2	4–3	7–0	6–1	4–3	9–10	5–2	1–6	—	5–1	13–6	7–13
Texas	4–3	1–6	3–4	2–4	4–3	7–12	5–2	6–13	4–2	3–4	6–13	9–10	1–5	—	3–3	9–11
Toronto	14–5	4–15	4–2	4–3	3–4	2–4	5–2	3–4	2–4	6–13	0–7	4–3	6–13	3–3	—	13–7

=== Game log ===
2018 White Sox Game Log: 62–100 (Home: 30–51; Away: 32–49)
March 2–0 (Home: 0–0; Road 2–0)

#	Date	Opponent	Time (CT)	Score	Win	Loss	Save	Record	Attendance	Streak/ Box
1	March 29	@ Royals	3:15 pm	14–7	**Shields** (1–0)	Duffy (0–1)	—	1–0	36,517	W1
2	March 31	@ Royals	6:15 pm	4–3	**Farquhar** (1–0)	Maurer (0–1)	**Soria** (1)	2–0	17,564	W2

April 6–18 (Home: 2–10; Road 4–8)

#	Date	Opponent	Time (CT)	Score	Win	Loss	Save	Record	Attendance	Streak/ Box
–	April 1	@ Royals	1:15 pm	**Postponed (cold)** (Rescheduled for April 28)						
3	April 2	@ Blue Jays	6:07 pm	2–4	Oh (1–0)	**Farquhar** (0–1)	Osuna (2)	2–1	16,629	L1
4	April 3	@ Blue Jays	6:07 pm	5–14	Happ (1–1)	**González** (0–1)	—	2–2	17,451	L2
5	April 4	@ Blue Jays	6:07 pm	4–3	**Jones** (1–0)	Tepera (1–1)	**Soria** (2)	3–2	17,268	W1
6	April 5	Tigers	3:10 pm	7–9 (10)	Jiménez (1–0)	**Infante** (0–1)	Greene (1)	3–3	33,318	L1
7	April 7	Tigers	1:10 pm	1–6	Fulmer (1–1)	**Giolito** (0–1)	—	3–4	16,625	L2
8	April 8	Tigers	1:10 pm	0–1	Fiers (1–0)	**López** (0–1)	Greene (2)	3–5	11,131	L3
9	April 9	Rays	1:10 pm	4–5	Archer (1–0)	**González** (0–2)	Colomé (2)	3–6	10,377	L4
10	April 10	Rays	1:10 pm	5–6	Snell (1–1)	**Fulmer** (0–1)	Colomé (3)	3–7	10,069	L5
11	April 11	Rays	1:10 pm	2–1	**Rondón** (1–0)	Pruitt (1–1)	**Jones** (1)	4–7	10,431	W1
12	April 12	@ Twins	7:10 pm	0–4	Berríos (2–1)	**Giolito** (0–2)	—	4–8	15,474	L1
–	April 13	@ Twins	7:10 pm	**Postponed (inclement weather)** (rescheduled for June 5)						
–	April 14	@ Twins	1:10 pm	**Postponed (snow)** (rescheduled for September 28)						
–	April 15	@ Twins	1:10 pm	**Postponed (snow)** (rescheduled for August 20)						
13	April 16	@ Athletics	9:05 pm	1–8	Mengden (2–2)	**López** (0–2)	—	4–9	7,479	L2
14	April 17	@ Athletics	9:05 pm	2–10	Cahill (1–0)	**González** (0–3)	—	4–10	46,028	L3
15	April 18	@ Athletics	2:35 pm	11–12 (14)	Trivino (1–0)	**Shields** (1–1)	—	4–11	13,321	L4
16	April 20	Astros	7:10 pm	0–10	Verlander (3–0)	**Shields** (1–2)	—	4–12	14,211	L5
17	April 21	Astros	6:10 pm	1–10	Keuchel (1–3)	**Giolito** (0–3)	—	4–13	23,902	L6
18	April 22	Astros	1:10 pm	1–7	McCullers Jr. (3–1)	**Bummer** (0–1)	—	4–14	17,167	L7
19	April 23	Mariners	7:10 pm	10–4	**Fulmer** (1–1)	Leake (2–2)	**Beck** (1)	5–14	13,614	W1
20	April 24	Mariners	4:10 pm	0–1	Gonzales (2–2)	**Volstad** (0–1)	Díaz (9)	5–15	10,761	L1
21	April 25	Mariners	1:10 pm	3–4	Hernández (3–2)	**Shields** (1–3)	Díaz (10)	5–16	11,417	L2
22	April 26	@ Royals	7:15 pm	6–3	**Giolito** (1–3)	Junis (3–2)	**Soria** (3)	6–16	18,315	W1
23	April 27	@ Royals	7:15 pm	7–4 (11)	**Infante** (1–1)	Hill (0–1)	**Soria** (4)	7–16	15,395	W2
24	April 28	@ Royals	1:15 pm	8–0	**Fulmer** (2–1)	Oaks (0–1)	—	8–16	16,971	W3
25	April 28	@ Royals	7:15 pm	2–5	Skoglund (1–2)	**Covey** (0–1)	Herrera (5)	8–17	16,070	L1
26	April 29	@ Royals	1:15 pm	4–5	McCarthy (2–0)	**Rondón** (1–1)	Boyer (1)	8–18	23,892	L2

May 8–19 (Home: 6–8; Road: 2–11)

#	Date	Opponent	Time (CT)	Score	Win	Loss	Save	Record	Attendance	Streak/ Box
27	May 1	@ Cardinals	7:15 pm	2–3	Norris (1–0)	**Soria** (0–1)	—	8–19	38,800	L3
28	May 2	@ Cardinals	12:15 pm	2–3	Martínez (3–1)	**Giolito** (1–4)	Norris (6)	8–20	37,298	L4
29	May 3	Twins	7:10 pm	6–5	**Jones** (2–0)	Reed (0–2)	—	9–20	13,260	W1
30	May 4	Twins	7:10 pm	4–6	Berrios (3-3)	**Fulmer** (2-2)	Rodney (4)	9–21	15,935	L1
31	May 5	Twins	6:10 pm	4–8	Lynn (1–3)	**Santiago** (0–1)	—	9–22	23,765	L2
32	May 6	Twins	1:10 pm	3–5	Duke (2–1)	**Rondón** (1–2)	Rodney (5)	9–23	17,424	L3
33	May 8	Pirates	7:10 pm	6–10	Glasnow (1-1)	**Volstad** (0–2)	—	9–24	12,871	L4
34	May 9	Pirates	1:10 pm	5–6	Rodriguez (1-1)	**Jones** (2–1)	Vasquez (7)	9–25	12,476	L5
35	May 11	@ Cubs	1:20 pm	2–11	Chatwood (3-3)	**Fulmer** (2–3)	—	9–26	39,585	L6
36	May 12	@ Cubs	1:20 pm	4–8	Lester (3–1)	**Shields** (1–4)	Morrow (9)	9–27	41,099	L7
37	May 13	@ Cubs	1:20 pm	5–3	**Giolito** (2–4)	Hendricks (3–3)	**Rondón** (1)	10–27	40,537	W1
38	May 15	@ Pirates	6:05 pm	0–7	Williams (5–2)	**López** (0–3)	—	10–28	11,847	L1
39	May 16	@ Pirates	11:35 am	2–3	Santana (1–0)	**Soria** (0–2)	Vázquez (8)	10–29	20,286	L2
40	May 17	Rangers	7:10 pm	4–2	**Avilán** (1–0)	Leclerc (1–1)	**Jones** (2)	11–29	17,666	W1
41	May 18	Rangers	7:10 pm	5–12	Chavez (2–0)	**Fulmer** (2–4)	—	11–30	16,373	L1
42	May 19	Rangers	6:10 pm	5–3	**Giolito** (3–4)	Jurado (0–1)	**Jones** (3)	12–30	25,611	W1
43	May 20	Rangers	1:10 pm	3–0	**López** (1–3)	Minor (3–3)	**Fry** (1)	13–30	16,829	W2
44	May 21	Orioles	7:10 pm	2–3	Cashner (2–5)	**Santiago** (0–2)	Brach (7)	13–31	11,628	L1
45	May 22	Orioles	7:10 pm	3–2	**Rondón** (2–2)	Givens (0–1)	**Jones** (4)	14–31	12,590	W1
46	May 23	Orioles	7:10 pm	11–1	**Covey** (1–1)	Cobb (1–6)	—	15–31	17,056	W2
47	May 24	Orioles	1:10 pm	3–9	Bundy (3–6)	**Giolito** (3–5)	—	15–32	19,147	L1
48	May 25	@ Tigers	6:10 pm	4–5	Farmer (1–3)	**Rondón** (2–3)	Greene (12)	15–33	24,648	L2
49	May 26	@ Tigers	3:10 pm	8–4	**Santiago** (1–2)	Liriano (3–2)	—	16–33	27,032	W1
50	May 27	@ Tigers	12:10 pm	2–3	Hardy (1–0)	**Shields** (1–5)	Greene (13)	16–34	23,419	L1
51	May 28	@ Indians	3:10 pm	6–9	Plutko (3–0)	**Volstad** (0–3)	—	16–35	23,729	L2
52	May 29	@ Indians	5:10 pm	3–7	Clevinger (4–2)	**Giolito** (3–6)	—	16–36	30,441	L3
53	May 30	@ Indians	12:10 pm	1–9	Kluber (8–2)	**López** (1–4)	—	16–37	17,930	L4

June 12–17 (Home: 8–9; Road: 4–8)

#	Date	Opponent	Time (CT)	Score	Win	Loss	Save	Record	Attendance	Streak/ Box
54	June 1	Brewers	7:10 pm	8-3	**Avilán** (2–0)	Anderson (4-4)	—	17-37	20,004	W1
55	June 2	Brewers	1:10 pm	0-5	Chacín (4–1)	**Shields** (1–6)	—	17-38	29,281	L1
56	June 3	Brewers	1:10 pm	6-1	**Volstad** (1–3)	Suter (5–4)	—	18-38	25,338	W1
57	June 5	@ Twins	3:10 pm	2-4	Duffey (1-1)	**Jones** (2–2)	Rodney (13)	18-39	26,261	L1
58	June 5	@ Twins	Game 2	6-3	**Giolito** (4–6)	Littell (0–1)	**Soria** (5)	19-39	26,261	W1
59	June 6	@ Twins	7:10 pm	5-2	**Santiago** (2–2)	Odorizzi (3-3)	**Soria** (6)	20-39	20,393	W2
60	June 7	@ Twins	12:10 pm	2-7	Berríos (7–5)	**Shields** (1–7)	—	20-40	21,469	L1
61	June 8	@ Red Sox	6:10 pm	1-0	**Covey** (2–1)	Sale (5–4)	**Soria** (7)	21-40	36,593	W1
62	June 9	@ Red Sox	3:05 pm	2-4	Price (7–4)	**Rodon** (0–1)	Kimbrel (20)	21-41	36,675	L1
63	June 10	@ Red Sox	12:05 pm	5-2	**López** (2–4)	Porcello (8–3)	—	22-41	36,998	W1
64	June 11	Indians	7:10 pm	0-4	Carrasco (8–4)	**Giolito** (4–7)	—	22-42	13,125	L1
65	June 12	Indians	7:10 pm	5-1	**Shields** (2–7)	Plutko (3–1)	**Soria** (9)	23-42	12,357	W1
66	June 13	Indians	7:10 pm	3-2	**Covey** (3-1)	Bauer (5-5)	**Soria** (10)	24-42	19,390	W2
67	June 14	Indians	1:10 pm	2-5	Clevinger (5-2)	**Volstad** (1-4)	Allen (13)	24-43	17,183	L1
68	June 15	Tigers	7:10 pm	3-4	Farmer (2–3)	**Minaya** (0–1)	Greene (18)	24-44	22,813	L2
69	June 16	Tigers	1:10 pm	5-7	Farmer (3–3)	**Fry** (0–1)	Greene (19)	24-45	23,195	L3
70	June 17	Tigers	1:10 pm	3–1	Hardy (3-1)	**Shields** (2–8)	Jiménez (2)	24-46	26,746	L4
71	June 18	@ Indians	6:10 pm	2–6	Bauer (6-5)	**Covey** (3-2)	—	24-47	17,271	L5
72	June 19	@ Indians	6:10 pm	3–6	Clevinger (6-2)	**Rodon** (0-2)	Allen (15)	24-48	20,394	L6
73	June 20	@ Indians	12:10 pm	0–12	Kluber (11-3)	**López** (2-5)	—	24-49	23,101	L7
–	June 21	Athletics	7:10 pm	**Postponed (rain)** (Rescheduled for June 22 as part of a doubleheader)						
74	June 22	Athletics	3:10 pm	2–11	Manaea (7–6)	**Shields** (2–9)	—	24-50	18,323	L8
75	June 22	Athletics	Game 2	6–4	**Giolito** (5–7)	Bassitt (0–3)	**Soria** (11)	25-50	18,323	W1
76	June 23	Athletics	1:10 pm	6–7	Trivino (5–1)	**Minaya**	Treinen (17)	25-51	20,457	L1
77	June 24	Athletics	1:10 pm	10–3	**Rodon** (1–2)	Blackburn	—	26-51	21,908	W1
78	June 26	Twins	7:10 pm	8–4	**López** (3–5)	Lynn (5–6)	—	27–51	16,276	W2
79	June 27	Twins	7:10 pm	6–1	**Shields** (3–9)	Gibson (2–6)	—	28–51	19,466	W3
80	June 28	Twins	1:10 pm	1–2 (13)	Busenitz (2–0)	**Santiago** (2–3)	—	28–52	21,610	L1
81	June 29	@ Rangers	7:05 pm	3–11	Gallardo (2–0)	**Covey** (3–3)	—	28–53	28,156	L2
82	June 30	@ Rangers	8:05 pm	4–13	Colón (5–5)	**Rodon** (1–3)	—	28–54	28,138	L3

July 9–15 (Home: 4–5; Road: 5–10)

#	Date	Opponent	Time (CT)	Score	Win	Loss	Save	Record	Attendance	Streak/ Box
83	July 1	@ Rangers	2:05 pm	10–5	**López** (4–5)	Hamels (4–7)	**Soria** (12)	29–54	22,684	W1
84	July 2	@ Reds	6:10 pm	3–5	Floro (3–2)	**Volstad** (1–5)	Iglesias (16)	29–55	16,727	L1
85	July 3	@ Reds	6:10 pm	12–8 (12)	**Santiago** (3–3)	Stephens (2–1)	—	30–55	22,742	W1
86	July 4	@ Reds	6:10 pm	4–7	Romano (5–8)	**Covey** (3–4)	Hughes (6)	30–56	24,442	L1
87	July 5	@ Astros	7:10 pm	3–4	Smith (3–1)	**Soria** (0–3)	—	30–57	34,955	L2
88	July 6	@ Astros	7:10 pm	4–11	McCullers Jr. (10–3)	**López** (4–6)	Peacock (2)	30–58	38,153	L3
89	July 7	@ Astros	3:10 pm	6–12	Morton (11–2)	**Shields** (3–10)	—	30–59	39,568	L4
90	July 8	@ Astros	1:10 pm	1–2	Keuchel (6–8)	**Giolito** (5–8)	Rondón (7)	30–60	41,654	L5
91	July 10	Cardinals	7:10 pm	2–14	Mikolas (10–3)	**Covey** (3–5)	—	30–61	23,245	L6
92	July 11	Cardinals	7:10 pm	4–0	**Rodon** (2–3)	Weaver (5–8)	**Soria** (13)	31–61	26,319	W1
93	July 13	Royals	7:10 pm	9–6	**Shields** (4–10)	Keller (2–4)	**Soria** (14)	32–61	19,361	W2
94	July 14	Royals	1:10 pm	0–5	Duffy (5–8)	**López** (4–7)	—	32–62	20,159	L1
95	July 15	Royals	1:10 pm	10–1	**Giolito** (6–8)	Smith (0–1)	—	33–62	23,434	W1
**89th All-Star Game in Washington, D.C.**
96	July 20	@ Mariners	9:10 pm	1–3	LeBlanc (6–1)	**Shields** (4–11)	Díaz (37)	33–63	43,331	L1
97	July 21	@ Mariners	9:10 pm	5–0	**Covey** (4–5)	Hernández (8–8)	—	34–63	38,186	W1
98	July 22	@ Mariners	3:10 pm	2–8	Gonzales (11–5)	**López** (4–8)	—	34–64	38,207	L1
99	July 23	@ Angels	9:07 pm	5–3	**Giolito** (7–8)	Barría (5–7)	**Soria** (15)	35–64	35,285	W1
100	July 24	@ Angels	9:07 pm	4–2	**Rodon** (3–3)	Pena (1–1)	**Soria** (16)	36–64	39,937	W2
101	July 25	@ Angels	9:07 pm	3–11	Skaggs (8–6)	**Shields** (4–12)	—	36–65	34,321	L1
102	July 26	@ Angels	3:07 pm	8–12	Tropeano (4–5)	Covey (4–6)	—	36–66	33,826	L2
103	July 27	Blue Jays	7:10 pm	5-10	Stroman (4–7)	**López** (4–9)	—	36–67	20,524	L3
104	July 28	Blue Jays	6:10 pm	9-5	**Minaya** (1–2)	Tepera (5–4)	—	37-67	29,442	W1
105	July 29	Blue Jays	1:10 pm	4-7	Santos (1-1)	**Fry** (0–2)	—	37–68	23,836	L1
106	July 31	Royals	7:10 pm	2-4	Duffy (7–9)	**Shields** (4–13)	Peralta (6)	37–69	15,250	L2

August 17–12 (Home: 6–9; Road: 11–3)

#	Date	Opponent	Time (CT)	Score	Win	Loss	Save	Record	Attendance	Streak/ Box
107	August 1	Royals	7:10 pm	5–10	Junis (6–11)	**Covey** (4–7)	—	37–70	18,019	L3
108	August 2	Royals	1:10 pm	6–4	**Cedeño** (1–0)	Adam (0–3)	**Avilán** (1)	38–70	19,682	W1
109	August 3	@ Rays	6:10 pm	3–2 (10)	**Danish** (1–0)	Alvarado (1–4)	**Santiago** (1)	39–70	16,144	W2
110	August 4	@ Rays	5:10 pm	2–1	**Cedeño** (2–0)	Chirinos (0–4)	**Vieira** (1)	40–70	21,214	W3
111	August 5	@ Rays	12:10 pm	8–7	**Santiago** (4–3)	Castillo (2–2)	—	41–70	14,379	W4
112	August 6	Yankees	7:10 pm	0–7	Lynn (8–8)	**Covey** (4–8)	—	41–71	22,084	L1
113	August 7	Yankees	7:10 pm	3–4 (13)	Gray (9–8)	**Avilán** (2–1)	—	41–72	19,643	L2
114	August 8	Yankees	7:10 pm	3–7	Severino (15–5)	**Giolito** (7–9)	—	41–73	27,038	L3
115	August 10	Indians	7:10 pm	1–0	**Fry** (1–2)	Ramirez (0–2)	—	42–73	18,772	W1
116	August 11	Indians	6:10 pm	1–3	Bauer (12–6)	**Shields** (4–14)	Allen (22)	42–74	28,061	L1
117	August 12	Indians	1:10 pm	7–9	Carrasco (14–6)	**Covey** (4–9)	Allen (23)	42–75	23,853	L2
118	August 13	@ Tigers	6:10 pm	5–9	Coleman (4–1)	**Gómez** (0–1)	—	42–76	20,964	L3
119	August 14	@ Tigers	6:10 pm	6–3	**Giolito** (8–9)	Hardy (4–5)	**Cedeño** (1)	43–76	20,661	W1
120	August 15	@ Tigers	12:10 pm	6–5	**Rodón** (4–3)	Zimmermann (5–5)	**Avilán** (2)	44–76	23,784	W2
121	August 17	Royals	7:10 pm	9–3	**Shields** (5–14)	Hill (1–4)	—	45–76	24,556	W3
122	August 18	Royals	6:10 pm	1–3	Keller (6–5)	**Covey** (4–10)	Peralta (8)	45–77	19,018	L1
123	August 19	Royals	1:10 pm	7–6	**Santiago** (5–3)	Flynn (3–4)	**Fry** (2)	46–77	22,033	W1
124	August 20	@ Twins	6:10 pm	8–5	**Giolito** (9–9)	Gonsalves (0–1)	—	47–77	23,431	W2
125	August 21	Twins	7:10 pm	2–5	May (2–0)	**Covey** (4–11)	Rogers (2)	47–78	23,133	L1
126	August 22	Twins	1:10 pm	7–3	**Rodón** (5–3)	Gibson (7–10)	—	48–78	15,160	W1
127	August 23	@ Tigers	12:10 pm	2–7	Boyd (8–11)	**Shields** (5–15)	—	48–79	22,247	L1
128	August 24	@ Tigers	6:10 pm	6–3	**Vieira** (1–0)	Jiménez (4–3)	—	49–79	23,191	W1
129	August 25	@ Tigers	5:10 pm	6–1	**Giolito** (10–9)	Carpenter (1–2)	—	50–79	26,183	W2
130	August 26	@ Tigers	12:10 pm	7–2	**Kopech** (1–0)	Zimmermann (6–6)	**Fry** (3)	51–79	34,036	W3
131	August 27	@ Yankees	6:05 pm	6–2	**Rodón** (6–3)	Tanaka (9–5)	—	52–79	41,456	W4
132	August 28	@ Yankees	6:05 pm	4–5	Betances (3–4)	**Covey** (4–12)	—	52–80	40,015	L1
133	August 29	@ Yankees	6:05 pm	4–1	**López** (5–9)	Sabathia (7–5)	**Fry** (4)	53–80	40,887	W1
134	August 30	Red Sox	7:10 pm	4–9	Brasier (1–0)	**Vieira** (1–1)	—	53–81	18,015	L1
135	August 31	Red Sox	7:10 pm	6–1	**Covey** (5–12)	Eovaldi (5–7)	—	54–81	23,625	W1

September 8–19 (Home: 4–10; Road: 4–9)

#	Date	Opponent	Time (CT)	Score	Win	Loss	Save	Record	Attendance	Streak/ Box
136	September 1	Red Sox	6:10 pm	1–6	Rodríguez (12–3)	**Rodón** (6–4)	—	54–82	22,639	L1
137	September 2	Red Sox	1:10 pm	8–0	**Shields** (6–15)	Johnson (4–4)	—	55–82	30,745	W1
138	September 3	Tigers	1:10 pm	4–2	**Fry** (2–2)	Greene (2–6)	—	56–82	15,540	W2
139	September 4	Tigers	7:10 pm	3–8	Liriano (4–9)	**Giolito** (10–10)	—	56–83	13,012	L1
140	September 5	Tigers	7:10 pm	2–10	Zimmermann (7–6)	**Kopech** (1–1)	—	56–84	16,036	L2
141	September 7	Angels	7:10 pm	2–5	Peña (2–4)	**Rodón** (6–5)	Buttrey (1)	56–85	18,236	L3
142	September 8	Angels	6:10 pm	3–12	Shoemaker (2–0)	**Shields** (6–16)	—	56–86	27,146	L4
143	September 9	Angels	1:10 pm	0–1	Heaney (9–9)	**Hamilton** (0–1)	Álvarez (1)	56–87	24,020	L5
144	September 10	@ Royals	7:15 pm	3–4 (10)	Newberry (2–0)	**Gómez** (0–2)	—	56–88	17,809	L6
145	September 11	@ Royals	7:15 pm	3–6	Keller (8–6)	**Covey** (5–13)	Peralta (10)	56–89	17,613	L7
146	September 12	@ Royals	7:15 pm	4–2 (12)	**Minaya** (2–2)	Smith (1–5)	**Santiago** (2)	57–89	17,840	W1
147	September 14	@ Orioles	6:05 pm	8–6	**Shields** (7–16)	Ortiz (0–1)	**Jones** (5)	58–89	18,265	W2
148	September 15	@ Orioles	6:05 pm	2–0	**López** (6–9)	Ramirez (1–6)	**Minaya** (1)	59–89	23,266	W3
149	September 16	@ Orioles	12:05 pm	4–8	Meisinger (1–0)	**Giolito** (10–11)	Fry (1)	59–90	19,104	L1
150	September 18	@ Indians	6:10 pm	3–5	Kluber (19–7)	**Rodon** (6–6)	Miller (2)	59–91	19,277	L2
151	September 19	@ Indians	6:10 pm	1–4	Pérez (1–1)	**Frare** (0–1)	—	59–92	18,263	L3
152	September 20	@ Indians	6:10 pm	5–4 (11)	**Santiago** (6–3)	Cimber (3–8)	—	60–92	19,457	W1
153	September 21	Cubs	3:10 pm	10–4	**López** (7–9)	Quintana (13–11)	—	61–92	34,027	W2
154	September 22	Cubs	6:10 pm	3–8	Lester (17–6)	**Giolito** (10–12)	—	61–93	39,724	L1
155	September 23	Cubs	1:10 pm	1–6	Hendricks (13–11)	**Rodon** (6–7)	—	61–94	39,449	L2
156	September 24	Indians	7:10 pm	0–4	Kluber (20–7)	**Hamilton** (0–2)	—	61–95	18,217	L3
157	September 25	Indians	7:10 pm	5–4	**Hamilton** (1–2)	Carrasco (16–10)	—	62–95	17,040	W1
158	September 26	Indians	7:10 pm	2–10	Bieber (11–5)	**Fry** (2–3)	—	62–96	25,598	L1
159	September 28	@ Twins	1:10 pm	1–2	Berríos (12–11)	**López** (7–10)	May (2)	62–97	20,245	L2
160	September 28	@ Twins	7:10 pm	4–12	Jong (1–1)	**Giolito** (10–13)	—	62–98	28,191	L3
161	September 29	@ Twins	6:10 pm	3–8	Gibson (10–13)	**Rodón** (6–8)	—	62–99	32,717	L4
162	September 30	@ Twins	2:10 pm	4–5	Vasquez (1–0)	**Covey** (5–14)	May (3)	62–100	30,144	L5

Legend: = Win = Loss = Postponement
Bold = White Sox team member

== Roster ==
2018 Chicago White Sox
Roster
Pitchers: 70 Luis Avilán; 54 Chris Beck; 39 Aaron Bummer; 61 Ryan Burr; 52 Xavier Cedeño; 68 Dylan Covey; 60 Tyler Danish; 43 Danny Farquhar; 67 Caleb Frare; 57 Jace Fry; 51 Carson Fulmer; 27 Lucas Giolito; 54 Jeanmar Gómez; 58 Miguel Gonzalez; 63 Ian Hamilton; 45 Greg Infante; 65 Nate Jones; 34 Michael Kopech; 40 Reynaldo López; 37 Juan Minaya; 55 Carlos Rodon; 44 Bruce Rondón; 66 José Ruiz; 53 Hector Santiago; 52 Rob Scahill; 33 James Shields; 48 Joakim Soria; 50 Thyago Vieira; 66 Chris Volstad	Catchers: 21 Welington Castillo; 62 Dustin Garneau; 60 Alfredo González; 38 Omar Narváez; 36 Kevan Smith; Infielders: 79 José Abreu; 7 Tim Anderson; 24 Matt Davidson; 10 Yoan Moncada; 20 José Rondón; 20 Tyler Saladino; 5 Yolmer Sánchez; 41 Matt Skole	Outfielders: 49 Ryan Cordell; 30 Nick Delmonico; 15 Adam Engel; 26 Avisaíl García; 28 Leury García; 25 Ryan LaMarre; 18 Daniel Palka; 32 Trayce Thompson; 22 Charlie Tilson	Manager: 17 Rick Renteria; Coaches: 8 Daryl Boston (first base); 12 Nick Capra (third base); 99 Don Cooper (pitching); 29 Curt Hasler (bullpen); 47 Joe McEwing (bench/infield); 59 Mark Salas (bullpen catcher/catching); 46 Greg Sparks (assistant hitting); 31 Todd Steverson (hitting)

== Statistics ==
=== Batting ===
Final Stats
Players in bold are on the active roster as of the 2022 season.

Note: G = Games played; AB = At bats; R = Runs; H = Hits; 2B = Doubles; 3B = Triples; HR = Home runs; RBI = Runs batted in; SB = Stolen bases; BB = Walks; K = Strikeouts; AVG = Batting average; OBP = On-base percentage; SLG = Slugging percentage;

Player	G	AB	R	H	2B	3B	HR	RBI	SB	BB	K	AVG	OBP	SLG
**José Abreu**	128	499	68	132	36	1	22	78	2	37	109	.265	.325	.473
**Tim Anderson**	153	567	77	136	28	3	20	64	26	30	149	.240	.281	.406
Welington Castillo	49	170	17	44	7	0	6	15	1	9	46	.259	.304	.406
Ryan Cordell	19	37	3	4	1	0	1	4	0	0	15	.108	.125	.216
**Matt Davidson**	123	434	51	99	23	0	20	62	0	52	165	.228	.319	419
Nick Delmonico	88	284	31	61	11	5	8	25	1	27	80	.215	.296	.373
**Adam Engel**	143	429	49	101	17	4	6	29	16	18	129	.235	.279	.336
**Avisaíl García**	93	356	47	84	11	2	19	49	3	20	102	.236	.281	.438
**Leury García**	82	255	23	70	7	4	4	32	12	9	69	.271	.303	.376
**Dustin Garneau**	1	2	0	1	0	0	0	1	0	1	0	.500	.667	.500
Alfredo González	3	9	0	1	0	0	0	1	0	0	4	.111	.111	.111
Ryan LaMarre	33	66	8	20	6	0	2	10	1	2	20	.303	.324	.485
**Yoán Moncada**	149	578	73	136	32	6	17	61	12	67	217	.235	.315	.400
Omar Narváez	97	280	30	77	14	1	9	30	0	38	65	.275	.366	.429
Daniel Palka	124	417	56	100	15	3	27	67	2	30	153	.240	.294	.484
José Rondón	42	100	15	23	6	0	6	14	2	7	30	.230	.280	.470
Tyler Saladino	6	8	2	2	1	0	0	0	0	0	3	.250	.250	.375
**Yolmer Sánchez**	155	600	62	145	34	10	8	55	14	49	138	.242	.306	.372
Matt Skole	4	11	2	3	0	0	1	1	0	2	3	.273	.385	.545
Kevan Smith	52	171	21	50	6	0	3	21	1	10	18	.292	.348	.380
**Trayce Thompson**	48	121	14	14	3	0	3	9	3	7	46	.116	.163	.215
Charlie Tilson	41	106	7	28	1	1	0	11	2	10	20	.264	.331	.292
Pitcher totals	162	20	0	1	0	0	0	0	0	0	13	.050	.050	.050
**Team totals**	**162**	**5523**	**656**	**1332**	**259**	**40**	**182**	**639**	**98**	**425**	**1594**	**.241**	**.302**	**.401**

=== Pitching ===
Final stats
Players in bold are on the active roster as of the 2022 season.

Note: W = Wins; L = Losses; ERA = Earned run average; G = Games pitched; GS = Games started; SV = Saves; IP = Innings pitched; H = Hits allowed; R = Runs allowed; ER = Earned runs allowed; BB = Walks allowed; K = Strikeouts

Player	W	L	ERA	G	GS	SV	IP	H	R	ER	BB	K
Luis Avilán	2	1	3.86	58	0	2	39.2	40	20	17	14	46
Chris Beck	0	0	4.18	14	0	1	23.2	24	11	11	11	16
**Aaron Bummer**	0	1	4.26	37	0	0	31.2	40	19	15	10	35
**Ryan Burr**	0	0	7.45	8	0	0	9.2	12	8	8	6	6
Xavier Cedeño	2	0	2.84	33	0	1	25.1	19	9	8	6	6
Dylan Covey	5	14	5.18	27	21	0	121.2	129	81	70	52	91
**Tyler Danish**	1	0	7.11	7	0	0	6.1	8	5	5	4	5
**Matt Davidson**	0	0	0.00	3	0	0	3.0	1	0	0	1	2
Danny Farquhar	1	1	5.63	8	0	0	8.0	6	5	5	0	9
Caleb Frare	0	1	5.14	11	0	0	7.0	6	4	4	4	9
Jace Fry	2	3	4.38	59	1	4	51.1	37	28	25	20	70
Carson Fulmer	2	4	8.07	9	8	0	32.1	37	32	29	24	29
**Lucas Giolito**	10	13	6.13	32	32	0	173.1	166	123	118	90	125
Jeanmar Gómez	0	2	4.68	26	0	0	25.0	29	15	13	10	27
Miguel González	0	3	12.41	3	3	0	12.1	24	18	17	6	5
**Ian Hamilton**	1	2	4.50	10	0	0	8.0	6	5	4	2	5
Greg Infante	1	1	8.00	10	0	0	9.0	12	8	8	8	6
Nate Jones	2	2	3.00	33	0	5	30.0	28	14	10	15	32
**Michael Kopech**	1	1	5.02	4	4	0	14.1	20	8	8	2	15
**Reynaldo López**	7	10	3.91	32	32	0	188.2	165	88	82	75	151
**Juan Minaya**	2	2	3.28	52	0	1	46.2	39	19	17	29	58
**Carlos Rodón**	6	8	4.18	20	20	0	120.2	97	61	56	55	90
Bruce Rondón	2	3	8.49	35	0	1	29.2	37	30	28	27	40
**José Ruiz**	0	0	4.15	6	0	0	4.1	5	2	2	3	6
Hector Santiago	6	3	4.41	49	7	2	102.0	101	54	50	60	103
Rob Scahill	0	0	5.40	6	0	0	5.0	5	4	3	3	3
James Shields	7	16	4.53	34	33	0	204.2	190	115	103	78	154
Joakim Soria	0	3	2.56	40	0	16	38.2	35	13	11	10	49
Thyago Vieira	1	1	7.13	16	0	1	17.2	21	14	14	9	15
Chris Volstad	1	5	6.27	33	1	0	47.1	65	35	33	12	29
**Team totals**	**62**	**100**	**4.83**	**162**	**162**	**34**	**1437.0**	**1404**	**848**	**771**	**653**	**1259**

== Farm system ==
Level	Team	League	Manager
AAA	Charlotte Knights	International League	Mark Grudzielanek
AA	Birmingham Barons	Southern League	Ryan Newman
A-Advanced	Winston-Salem Dash	Carolina League	Omar Vizquel
A	Kannapolis Intimidators	South Atlantic League	Justin Jirschele
Rookie	Great Falls Voyagers	Pioneer League	Tim Esmay
Rookie	AZL White Sox	Arizona League	
Rookie	DSL White Sox	Dominican Summer League	Julio Valdez
