= 2006 Little League World Series results =

Children's baseball competition results

All times shown are US EDT.

Pool play
Pool A	(New York (state)) MA 2 (F/7) (Georgia (U.S. state)) SE 3 ◄ linescore	(Arizona) W 1 ◄ (Illinois) GL 0 linescore	(Georgia (U.S. state)) SE 4 ◄ (Arizona) W 1 linescore	(New York (state)) MA 0 (Illinois) GL 1 ◄ linescore	(Arizona) W 4 ◄ (New York (state)) MA 1 linescore	(Georgia (U.S. state)) SE 0 (Illinois) GL 2 ◄ linescore
Pool B	(New Hampshire) NE 6 ◄ (Oregon) NW 1 linescore	(Louisiana) SW 1 ◄ (Missouri) MW 0 (F/9) linescore	(New Hampshire) NE 5 (Missouri) MW 14 ◄ linescore	(Louisiana) SW 1 (Oregon) NW 9 ◄ linescore	(Louisiana) SW 0 (New Hampshire) NE 5 ◄ linescore	(Oregon) NW 2 ◄ (Missouri) MW 1 linescore
Pool C	(Saudi Arabia) TRA 5 ◄ (Canada) CAN 0 linescore	(Northern Mariana Islands) PAC 1 (Saudi Arabia) TRA 9 ◄ linescore	(Northern Mariana Islands) PAC 0 (F/8) (Venezuela) LA 1 ◄ linescore	(Canada) CAN 2 (Venezuela) LA 3 ◄ linescore	(Canada) CAN 2 ◄ (Northern Mariana Islands) PAC 1 linescore	(Saudi Arabia) TRA 0 (F/8) (Venezuela) LA 1 ◄ linescore
Pool D	(Russia) EMEA 0 (F/5) (Japan) ASIA 11 ◄ linescore	(Curaçao) CAR 2 (Mexico) MEX 3 ◄ linescore	(Russia) EMEA 1 (F/5) (Mexico) MEX 11 ◄ linescore	(Russia) EMEA 0 (Curaçao) CAR 8 ◄ linescore	(Japan) ASIA 6 ◄ (Mexico) MEX 1 linescore	(Japan) ASIA 7 ◄ (Curaçao) CAR 2 linescore
Elimination round
Semifinals	(Japan) ASIA 4 ◄ (Saudi Arabia) TRA 1 linescore			(Illinois) GL 3 (Oregon) NW 4 ◄ linescore		
Semifinals	(Venezuela) LA 0 (F/4) (Mexico) MEX 11 ◄ linescore			(Georgia (U.S. state)) SE 8 ◄ (New Hampshire) NE 0 linescore		
Finals	(Georgia (U.S. state)) SE 7 ◄ (Oregon) NW 3 linescore			(Japan) ASIA 3 ◄ (Mexico) MEX 0 linescore		
Championship Game
	(Japan) ASIA 1 (Georgia (U.S. state)) SE 2 ◄ linescore					

== Pool play ==
=== Pool A ===
Rank	Region	Record	Runs Allowed	Run Ratio
1	Great Lakes	2–1	1	0.056
2	Southeast	2–1	5	0.263
3	West	2–1	5	0.278
4	Mid-Atlantic	0–3	8	0.421

==== Southeast 3, Mid-Atlantic 2 ====
- Game time: August 19 13:00 US EDT

Team	1	2	3	4	5	6	7	8	9	R	H	E
(New York (state)) Mid-Atlantic	0	0	1	0	1	0	0	x	x	2	5	0
(Georgia (U.S. state)) Southeast ◄	1	0	1	0	0	0	1	x	x	3	7	1
WP: Kyle Carter (1–0) LP: Joe Calabrese (0–1) Sv: None; Home runs: MA: None; SE: Cody Walker

==== West 1, Great Lakes 0 ====
- Game time: August 19 15:10 US EDT

Team	1	2	3	4	5	6	R	H	E
(Arizona) West ◄	1	0	0	0	0	0	1	2	0
(Illinois) Great Lakes	0	0	0	0	0	0	0	1	0
WP: Shaun Chase (1–0) LP: Josh Ferry (0–1) Sv: None; Home runs: W: Shaun Chase; GL: None

==== Southeast 4, West 1 ====
- Game time: August 20 13:10 US EDT

Team	1	2	3	4	5	6	R	H	E
(Georgia (U.S. state)) Southeast ◄	0	0	1	1	0	2	4	6	2
(Arizona) West	0	0	1	0	0	0	1	1	1
WP: Kyle Carter (2–0) LP: Chase Knox (0–1) Sv: None; Home runs: SE: Kyle Carter, J.T. Phillips; W: None

==== Great Lakes 1, Mid-Atlantic 0 ====
- Game time: August 20 20:10 US EDT

Team	1	2	3	4	5	6	R	H	E
(Illinois) Great Lakes ◄	0	1	0	0	0	0	1	2	0
(New York (state)) Mid-Atlantic	0	0	0	0	0	0	0	1	1
WP: David Hearne (1–0) LP: Joe Calabrese (0–2) Sv: None

==== West 4, Mid-Atlantic 1 ====
- Game time: August 22 15:10 US EDT

Team	1	2	3	4	5	6	R	H	E
(Arizona) West ◄	1	2	1	0	0	0	4	10	0
(New York (state)) Mid-Atlantic	0	0	0	0	1	0	1	2	0
WP: Shaun Chase (2–0) LP: Frank Smith (0–1) Sv: None; Home runs: W: Shaun Chase; MA: None

==== Great Lakes 2, Southeast 0 ====
- Game time: August 22 20:16 US EDT

Team	1	2	3	4	5	6	R	H	E
(Georgia (U.S. state)) Southeast	0	0	0	0	0	0	0	1	1
(Illinois) Great Lakes ◄	0	2	0	0	0	x	2	2	0
WP: Josh Ferry (1–0) LP: Kyle Rovig (0–1) Sv: None

=== Pool B ===
Rank	Region	Record	Runs Allowed	Run Ratio
1	New England	2–1	15	0.833
2	Northwest	2–1	8	0.444
3	Midwest	1–2	6	0.381
4	Southwest	1–2	14	0.737

==== New England 6, Northwest 1 ====
- Game time: August 18 16:00 US EDT

Team	1	2	3	4	5	6	R	H	E
(New Hampshire) New England ◄	5	1	0	0	0	0	6	5	0
(Oregon) Northwest	0	1	0	0	0	0	1	2	0
WP: Jordan Bean (1–0) LP: Devon DeJardin (0–1) Sv: None; Home runs: NE: Billy Hartmann; NW: Devon DeJardin

==== Southwest 1, Midwest 0 ====
- Game time: August 18 20:00 US EDT

Team	1	2	3	4	5	6	7	8	9	R	H	E
(Louisiana) Southwest ◄	0	0	0	0	0	0	0	0	1	1	8	0
(Missouri) Midwest	0	0	0	0	0	0	0	0	0	0	5	1
WP: Nick Zaunbrecher (1–0) LP: Ryan Schmidt (0–1)

==== Midwest 14, New England 5 ====
- Game time: August 20 11:00 US EDT: moved from August 19 at 20:00 due to rain

Team	1	2	3	4	5	6	R	H	E
(New Hampshire) New England	2	1	1	1	0	0	5	11	7
(Missouri) Midwest ◄	0	3	3	5	3	X	14	13	2
WP: Landon Clapp (1–0) LP: Keegan Taylor (0–1) Sv: None

==== New England 5, Southwest 0 ====
- Game time: August 20 15:00 US EDT
  Team	1	2	3	4	5	6	R	H	E
  (Louisiana) Southeast	0	0	0	0	0	0	0	2	2
  (New Hampshire) New England ◄	0	0	0	0	5	X	5	5	1
  WP: Jordan Bean (2–0) LP: Nick Zaunbrecher (1–1) Sv: None

==== Northwest 2, Midwest 1 ====
- Game time: August 21 20:13 US EDT

Team	1	2	3	4	5	6	R	H	E
(Oregon) Northwest ◄	0	0	0	0	1	1	2	8	0
(Illinois) Midwest	0	1	0	0	0	0	1	3	0
WP: Jace Fry (1–0) LP: Ryan Phillips (0–1) Sv: None

=== Pool C ===
Rank	Region	Record	Runs Allowed	Run Ratio
1	Latin America	3–0	2	0.136
2	Transatlantic	2–1	2	0.100
3	Canada	1–2	9	0.500
4	Pacific	0–3	12	0.600

==== Transatlantic 5, Canada 0 ====
- Game time: August 18 18:00 US EDT

Team	1	2	3	4	5	6	R	H	E
(Saudi Arabia) Transatlantic ◄	0	0	0	2	0	3	5	6	0
Canada	0	0	0	0	0	0	0	5	2
WP: Andrew Holden (1–0) LP: Justin Atkinson (0–1) Sv: None; Home runs: TRA: Matt Timoney, Andrew Holden; CAN: None

==== Transatlantic 9, Pacific 1 ====
- Game time: August 20 18:00 US EDT

Team	1	2	3	4	5	6	R	H	E
(Saudi Arabia) Transatlantic ◄	3	1	3	2	0	0	9	10	0
(Northern Mariana Islands) Pacific	0	0	0	0	1	0	1	3	0
WP: Matt Timoney (1–0) LP: Brian Camacho (0–1) Sv: None; Home runs: TRA: Andrew Holden, George Luo; PAC: none

==== Latin America 1, Pacific 0 ====
- Game time: August 19 18:00 US EDT: Game resumed on August 21 at 10:00 US EDT.

Team	1	2	3	4	5	6	7	8	9	R	H	E
(Northern Mariana Islands) Pacific	0	0	0	0	0	0	0	0	x	0	4	0
(Venezuela) Latin America ◄	0	0	0	0	0	0	0	1	x	1	3	0
WP: Alexander D. Ramirez (1–0) LP: Joseph Palacios (0–1) Sv: None

==== Latin America 3, Canada 2 ====
- Game time: August 21 18:00 US EDT

Team	1	2	3	4	5	6	R	H	E
(Venezuela) Latin America ◄	2	0	1	0	0	0	3	7	2
Canada	0	0	1	0	0	1	2	7	1
WP: Andrew Holden (1–0) LP: Harry Nakamura (0–1) Sv: None; Home runs: LA: Roberto Valera; CAN: None

==== Canada 2, Pacific 1 ====
- Game time: August 22 13:12 US EDT

Team	1	2	3	4	5	6	R	H	E
(Northern Mariana Islands) Pacific	0	0	1	0	0	0	1	7	5
Canada ◄	0	0	0	0	0	2	2	7	1
WP: Jeff Bouchard (1–0) LP: Justin Atkinson (0–1) Sv: None; Home runs: PAC: None; CAN: None

==== Latin America 1, Transatlantic 0 ====
- Game time: August 22 18:10 US EDT

Team	1	2	3	4	5	6	7	8	9	R	H	E
(Saudi Arabia) Transatlantic	0	0	0	0	0	0	0	0	x	0	3	1
(Venezuela) Latin America ◄	0	0	0	0	0	0	0	1	x	1	5	0
WP: Alexander D. Ramirez (2–0) LP: Nate Barnett (0–1) Sv: None

=== Pool D ===
Rank	Region	Record	Runs Allowed	Run Ratio
1	Asia	3–0	3	0.176
2	Mexico	2–1	9	0.529
3	Caribbean	1–2	10	0.556
4	EMEA	0–3	30	1.875

==== Asia 11, EMEA 0 ====
- Game time: August 19 11:00 US EDT

Team	1	2	3	4	5	6	R	H	E
(Japan) Asia ◄	1	0	4	1	5	x	11	17	0
(Russia) EMEA	0	0	0	0	0	x	0	0	1
WP: Ryoya Sato (1–0) LP: Dmitriy Semenov (0–1) Sv: None; Home runs: ASIA: Jin Ohkuma, Takehiro Imai, Seigo Yada; EMEA: None

Completed early due to mercy rule

==== Mexico 3, Caribbean 2 ====
- Game time: August 19 16:00 US EDT

Team	1	2	3	4	5	6	R	H	E
(Curaçao) Caribbean	0	0	2	0	0	0	2	3	0
Mexico ◄	0	0	0	0	1	2	3	8	2
WP: Omar Zamora (1–0) LP: Mirangelo Muller (0–1) Sv: None; Home runs: CAR: None; MEX: Jorge Villafranca

==== Mexico 11, EMEA 1 ====
- Game time: August 20 19:00 US EDT

Team	1	2	3	4	5	6	R	H	E
Mexico ◄	2	2	2	2	3	x	11	9	2
(Russia) EMEA	0	0	0	1	0	x	1	2	7
WP: Josue Barron (1–0) LP: Andrey Vesenev (0–1) Sv: None; Home runs: MEX: Jose Ortiz; EMEA: None

Completed early due to mercy rule

==== Caribbean 8, EMEA 0 ====
- Game time: August 21 11:00 US EDT

Team	1	2	3	4	5	6	R	H	E
(Curaçao) Caribbean ◄	0	1	3	1	2	1	8	9	0
(Russia) EMEA	0	0	0	0	0	0	0	2	2
WP: Diënston Manuela (1–0) LP: Denis Leonov (0–1) Sv: None

==== Asia 6, Mexico 1 ====
- Game time: August 21 13:00 US EDT

Team	1	2	3	4	5	6	R	H	E
(Japan) Asia ◄	0	1	5	0	0	0	6	3	0
Mexico	1	0	0	0	0	0	1	8	2
WP: Seigo Yada (1–0) LP: Jose Segoviano (0–1) Sv: None; Home runs: ASIA: Ryota Kioke, Seigo Yada, Naruto Fukuyama; MEX: Jose Segoviano

==== Asia 7, Caribbean 2 ====
- Game time: August 22 11:11 US EDT

Team	1	2	3	4	5	6	R	H	E
(Japan) Asia ◄	1	0	2	0	0	4	7	6	1
(Curaçao) Caribbean	0	0	0	0	1	1	2	4	2
WP: Go Masumoto (1–0) LP: Sherman Lacrus (0–1) Sv: None; Home runs: ASIA: Seigo Yada, Go Masumoto; CAR: Ingemar Haime

== Elimination round ==
Quarter-finals
August 24 – 3:00 pm – Lamade
(Saudi Arabia) Transatlantic	1
(Japan) Asia	4
August 23 – 3:00 pm – Lamade (F/4)
(Venezuela) Latin America	0
Mexico	11
August 24 – 7:30 pm – Lamade
(Georgia (U.S. state)) Southeast	8
(New Hampshire) New England	0
August 23 – 7:30 pm – Lamade
(Illinois) Great Lakes	3
(Oregon) Northwest	4

Semi-finals
August 26 – 7:30 pm – Lamade
(Japan) Asia	3
Mexico	0
August 27 – 3:30 pm – Lamade
(Georgia (U.S. state)) Southeast	7
(Oregon) Northwest	3

Final
August 28 – 5:00 pm – Lamade
(Japan) Asia	1
(United States) (Georgia (U.S. state)) Southeast	2

=== Semifinals ===
==== Mexico 11, Latin America 0 ====
- Game time: August 23 15:12 US EDT

Team	1	2	3	4	5	6	R	H	E
Mexico ◄	3	4	4	0	x	x	11	11	0
(Venezuela) Latin America	0	0	0	0	x	x	0	3	2
WP: Omar Zamora (1–0) LP: Manuel A. Barrios (0–1) Sv: None; Home runs: MEX: Jose Segoviano, Josue Barron, Roberto Guajardo; LA: None

==== Northwest 4, Great Lakes 3 ====
- Game time: August 23 19:40 US EDT

Team	1	2	3	4	5	6	R	H	E
(Oregon) Northwest ◄	0	0	0	2	0	2	4	5	0
(Illinois) Great Lakes	0	0	2	0	0	1	3	0	3
WP: Devon DeJardin (2–1) LP: David Hearne (0–1) Sv: None

==== Asia 4, Transatlantic 1 ====
- Game time: August 24 18:00 US EDT

Team	1	2	3	4	5	6	R	H	E
(Japan) Asia ◄	0	0	0	2	0	2	4	4	1
(Saudi Arabia) Transatlantic	0	0	0	0	1	0	1	4	2
WP: Ryoyo Sato (2–0) LP: Matt Timoney (1–1) Sv: None; Home runs: ASIA: Ryoyo Sato; TRA: None

==== Southeast 8, New England 0 ====
- Game time: August 24 19:41 US EDT

Team	1	2	3	4	5	6	R	H	E
(New Hampshire) New England	0	0	0	0	0	0	0	3	1
(Georgia (U.S. state)) Southeast ◄	0	4	0	2	2	x	8	6	0
WP: Kyle Carter (3–0) LP: Keegan Taylor (0–2) Sv: None; Home runs: NE: None; SE: Kyle Carter

=== Finals ===
==== Southeast 7, Northwest 3 ====
- Game time: August 26 15:43 US EDT

Team	1	2	3	4	5	6	R	H	E
(Georgia (U.S. state)) Southeast ◄	3	0	0	0	1	3	7	8	1
(Oregon) Northwest	0	0	0	3	0	0	3	6	2
WP: J.T. Phillips (1–0) LP: Jace Fry (1–1) Sv: None; Home runs: SE: None; NW: Trevor Nix

==== Asia 3, Mexico 0 ====
- Game time: August 26 19:30 US EDT

Team	1	2	3	4	5	6	R	H	E
(Japan) Asia ◄	0	0	0	3	0	0	3	5	1
Mexico	0	0	0	0	0	0	0	3	0
WP: Seigo Yada (2–0) LP: Josue Barron (1–1) Sv: None; Home runs: ASIA: Seigo Yada, Go Matsumoto; MEX: None

=== Consolation Game ===
- Game cancelled due to rain; both Matamoros, Mexico and Beaverton, Oregon shared third place.

=== Championship Game ===
==== Southeast 2, Asia 1 ====
- Game time: August 28 20:00 US EDT

Team	1	2	3	4	5	6	R	H	E
(Japan) Asia	0	0	1	0	0	0	1	3	0
(Georgia (U.S. state)) Southeast ◄	0	0	2	0	0	X	2	3	0
WP: Kyle Carter (4–0) LP: Go Matsumoto (1–1) Sv: None; Home runs: ASIA: None; SE: Cody Walker

- Game was postponed due to rain.
