= Xavier Cedeño =

Puerto Rican baseball player (born 1986)

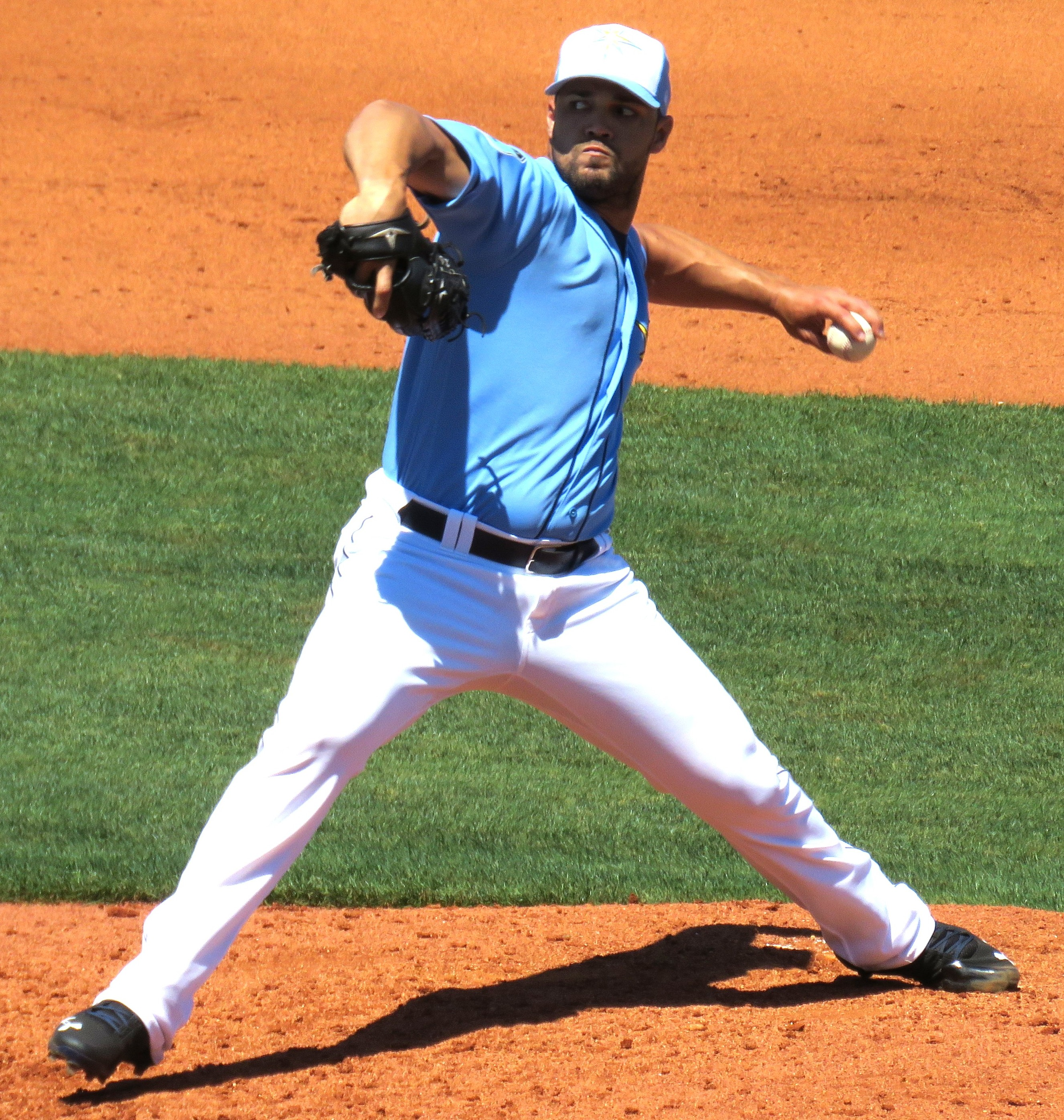
- Cedeño with the Tampa Bay Rays in 2017
- Pitcher
- Born: August 26, 1986 (age 40); Guayanilla, Puerto Rico
- Batted: Left Threw: Left

MLB debut
- September 16, 2011, for the Houston Astros

Last MLB appearance
- May 21, 2019, for the Chicago Cubs

MLB statistics
- Win–loss record: 10–7
- Earned run average: 3.65
- Strikeouts: 175
- Stats at Baseball Reference

Teams
- Houston Astros (2011–2013); Washington Nationals (2013–2015); Tampa Bay Rays (2015–2017); Chicago White Sox (2018); Milwaukee Brewers (2018); Chicago Cubs (2019)
Medals
Men's baseball
Representing Puerto Rico
World Baseball Classic
Silver medal – second place	2013 San Francisco	Team

Xavier Cedeño Quiñones (born August 26, 1986) is a Puerto Rican former professional baseball relief pitcher. He played in Major League Baseball (MLB) for the Houston Astros, Washington Nationals, Tampa Bay Rays, Chicago White Sox, Milwaukee Brewers, and Chicago Cubs.

== Career ==
=== Colorado Rockies ===
Cedeño attended Asuncíon Rodriguez De Sala School in Guayanilla, Puerto Rico, and Miami-Dade College. The Colorado Rockies selected Cedeño in the 31st round of the 2004 Major League Baseball draft. He played in the Rockies' minor league system from 2005 to 2009. He played for the Casper Rockies, Asheville Tourists, Modesto Nuts and Tulsa Drillers. He was released at the end of spring training in 2010 and he did not play that year.

=== Houston Astros ===
Cedeño was signed to a minor league contract by the Houston Astros on December 22, 2010. With the Double-A Corpus Christi Hooks of the Texas League, he was 5–6 with a 3.95 ERA in 23 games with 19 starts. On June 22 against the Frisco RoughRiders he struck out the first nine batters he faced in a record-setting 14 strikeout game. He was subsequently promoted to the Triple-A Oklahoma City RedHawks.

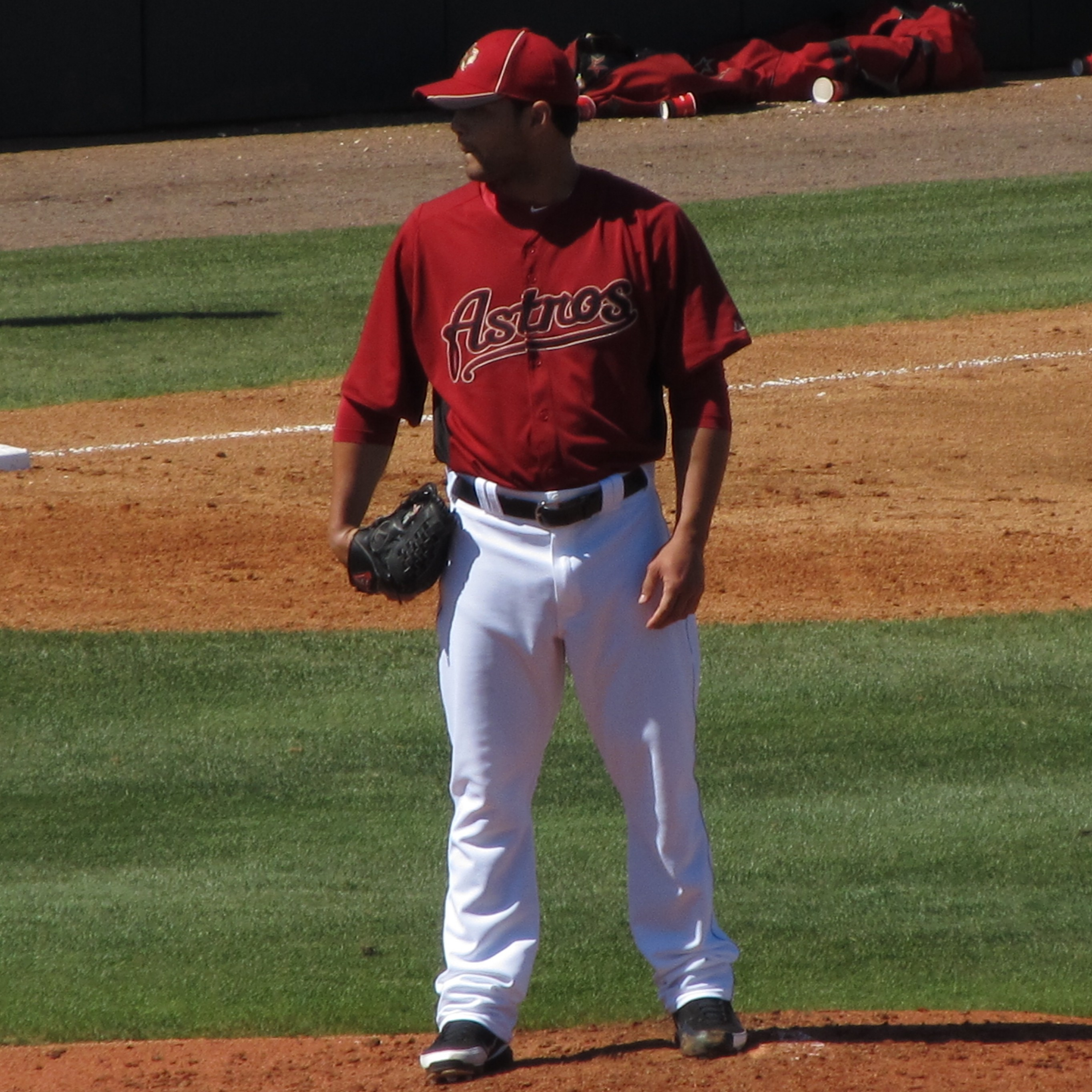
Cedeño pitching for the Houston Astros in 2012 Spring Training

The Astros promoted Cedeño to the major leagues on September 11, 2011, and he made his Major League debut on September 16 against the Chicago Cubs. He faced two batters, the first one flew out to right field and the second one singled. He appeared in two more games that season, allowing five runs in one inning in his last appearance. He was outrighted off the 40 man roster on October 5.

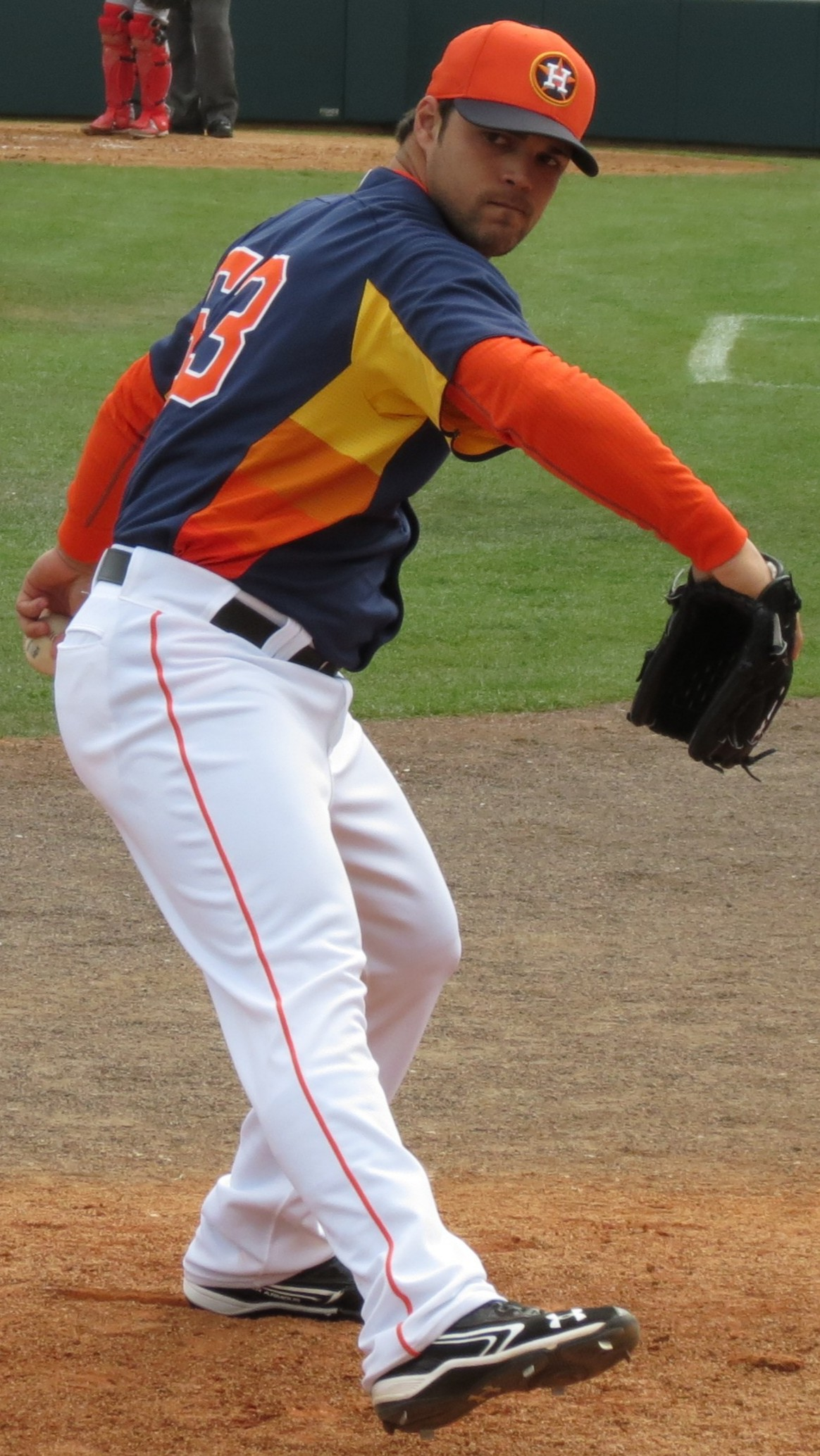
Cedeño pitching for the Houston Astros in 2013 Spring Training

Cedeño signed a new minor league contract with the Astros on October 24. Cedeño began the 2012 season with the RedHawks, where he had a 2–0 win–loss record with a 0.42 earned run average in 17 games before being promoted to Houston when Fernando Abad was placed on the 15-day disabled list. In 44 games with the Astros, he had a 3.77 ERA.

Cedeño played for the Puerto Rican national baseball team in the 2013 World Baseball Classic. He had one save and a 2.08 ERA in seven appearances. In five games for the Astros at the start of the 2013 season he allowed 11 runs in only 6 1/3 innings.

=== Washington Nationals ===
Cedeño was claimed on waivers by the Washington Nationals on April 23, 2013, and assigned to the Syracuse Chiefs of the Triple-A International League. In 25 games for the Nationals over parts of three seasons, he had a 3.38 ERA with 15 strikeouts.

Cedeño was designated for assignment by the Nationals on April 14, 2015.

=== Tampa Bay Rays ===
Cedeño was traded to the Los Angeles Dodgers on April 22, 2015, in exchange for cash considerations. The Dodgers designated him for assignment on April 24 and then traded him to the Tampa Bay Rays for cash considerations on April 27. Cedeño made 61 appearances for Tampa Bay during the regular season, compiling a 4–1 record and 2.09 ERA with 43 strikeouts and one save over 43 innings of work.

Cedeño made 54 appearances out of the bullpen for the Rays in the 2016 season, registering a 3–4 record and 3.70 ERA with 43 strikeouts across 41 1/3 innings pitched. He pitched in nine games for Tampa Bay in 2017, but struggled to a 12.00 ERA with no strikeouts over three innings of work. On December 1, 2017, Cedeño was non-tendered by Tampa Bay, making him a free agent.

=== Chicago White Sox ===
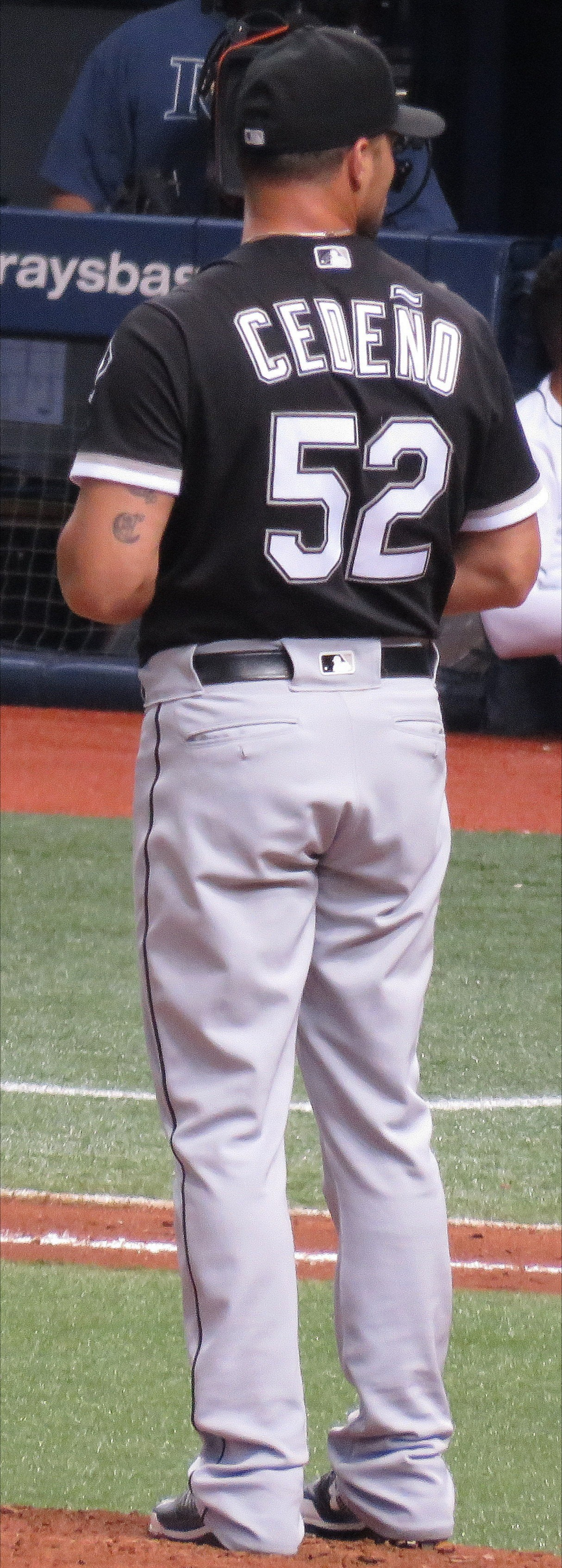
Cedeño pitching for the Chicago White Sox in 2018

Cedeño signed a contract with the Chicago White Sox on January 26, 2018. He was activated from the disabled list on June 7. In 33 relief outings for the White Sox, Cedeño compiled a 2–0 record and 2.84 ERA with 28 strikeouts and one save across 25 1/3 innings pitched.

=== Milwaukee Brewers ===
On August 31, 2018, Cedeño was traded to the Milwaukee Brewers in exchange for minor league prospects Bryan Connell and Johan Dominguez. He made 15 appearances for Milwaukee down the stretch, recording a 1.13 ERA with six strikeouts over eight innings of work.

=== Chicago Cubs ===
On February 14, 2019, Cedeño signed a one-year contract with the Chicago Cubs. The deal is worth $900,000 plus incentives. After a stint on the injured list for left wrist inflammation and a rehab assignment with the Triple-A Iowa Cubs and Double-A Tennessee Smokies, the Cubs activated Cedeño on May 11. He was placed on the disabled list on May 22. In five appearances for the Cubs, Cedeño tossed two scoreless innings, with one strikeout and three walks. Cedeño became a free agent after the season.

== See also ==
- List of Major League Baseball players from Puerto Rico
