= Charlie Tilson =

American baseball player (born 1992)

- Center fielder
- Born: December 2, 1992 (age 33); Wilmette, Illinois, U.S.
- Batted: Left Threw: Left

MLB debut
- August 2, 2016, for the Chicago White Sox

Last MLB appearance
- July 16, 2019, for the Chicago White Sox

MLB statistics
- Batting average: .246
- Home runs: 1
- Runs batted in: 23
- Stats at Baseball Reference

Teams
- Chicago White Sox (2016, 2018–2019)

Charles Everett Tilson (born December 2, 1992) is an American former professional baseball center fielder. He played in Major League Baseball (MLB) for the Chicago White Sox from 2016 to 2019. Coming up in the St. Louis Cardinals organization, Tilson was rated as the Best Defensive Outfielder in 2012 and Fastest Baserunner in 2013 of the organization by Baseball America, while also ranking as high as ninth best prospect in the organization, in 2014.

== Playing career ==
Tilson attended New Trier High School in Winnetka, Illinois. He played both baseball and football. As a senior, he was the Illinois Gatorade Baseball Player of the Year.

=== St. Louis Cardinals ===
The St. Louis Cardinals selected Tilson in the second round of the 2011 Major League Baseball draft. He signed with the Cardinals rather than play college baseball at the University of Illinois. Tilson made his professional debut that season with the Gulf Coast Cardinals and also played for the Johnson City Cardinals. Tilson was supposed to play for the Batavia Muckdogs in 2012, using the time before the season began to develop his power behind the plate while at extended spring training. However, on May 11, Tilson suffered a separated right shoulder while attempting a diving catch, an injury which required season-ending surgery.

Tilson spent most of 2013 with Single-A Peoria, playing in 100 games before receiving a late season promotion to High-A Palm Beach. With the Chiefs, Tilson hit .303/.349/.388 with 4 HR, 30 RBI, 15 SB and 49 runs. Tilson returned to Palm Beach in 2014, where he made the mid-season Florida State League All-Start team after hitting .298 with 17 RBI in the first half. In July, Tilson was promoted to Double-A Springfield, where he finished out the season. Tilson was also slated to appear in the Arizona Fall League after the season, but missed out with a stress fracture in his foot. In 120 games between the two teams, Tilson hit .289/.333/.389 with 7 HR, 53 RBI, and 73 runs. He stole 12 bases, but was caught stealing 10 times as well.

Tilson started the 2015 season with the Springfield Cardinals of the Texas League. He was a mid-season All-Star selection with a .288 average, seven doubles, four triples with 11 RBI and 36 run scored. In 134 games with Springfield, Tilson hit .295/.351/.388 with 4 HR, 32 RBI, and 85 runs, but vastly improved his stolen base numbers, stealing a Texas League high 46 bases while being caught 19 times. After the season, Tilson got a chance to play in the Arizona Fall League with Surprise, while also being added to the Cardinals 40-man roster, thereby protecting him from the Rule V Draft. Tilson began 2016 with Triple-A Memphis, where in 100 games, he hit .282/.345/.407 with 4 HR, 34 RBI, 53 runs, and 15 stolen bases to just 3 times being caught. Tilson made 55 starts in center field, as well as 72 starts in the leadoff position.

=== Chicago White Sox ===
On July 31, 2016, the Cardinals traded Tilson to the Chicago White Sox, the team he grew up rooting for, for relief pitcher Zach Duke. Tilson was recalled to the major league roster, taking the place of incumbent center fielder J. B. Shuck, and was expected to immediately contribute as a regular outfielder.

[He's a] high character kid, plus speed, solid defense, very good bat-to-ball skills. We think he has a chance to potentially be an everyday guy out there in center.

— Rick Hahn, White Sox general manager

He made his debut against the Detroit Tigers on August 2, and got his first major league hit, a single, in his first at bat, against Aníbal Sánchez. Unfortunately, Tilson strained his left hamstring during the game attempting to make a diving catch, and was placed on the disabled list, curiously becoming the fourth White Sox member in 2016 to become injured on or before their debut. On August 4, Tilson underwent season-ending surgery.

Following the offseason trade of Adam Eaton, Tilson was among the favorites to land the center field job out of spring training in 2017, receiving the endorsement of general manager Rick Hahn. However, Tilson suffered a stress reaction in the same foot he previously had a stress fracture and missed all of the 2017 season.

Fully healthy, Tilson began 2018 with the Charlotte Knights. He was recalled by the White Sox on May 24. In 2018 with Chicago, Tilson batted .264/.331/.292 with 11 RBI. The White Sox designated Tilson for assignment after the 2018 season. Tilson was outrighted on January 17, 2019. On May 6, 2019, Tilson was selected to the active roster. On May 22, Tilson hit a grand slam for his first major league home run off of Astros reliever Josh James. On October 3, 2019, Tilson was outrighted to AAA and elected free agency.

=== Pittsburgh Pirates ===
On January 31, 2020, Tilson signed a minor league deal with the Pittsburgh Pirates. Tilson was released by the Pirates organization on June 9, 2020.

=== Acereros de Monclova ===
On May 20, 2021, Tilson signed with the Acereros de Monclova of the Mexican Baseball League. He hit .100 in 7 games before being released on May 29.

=== Long Island Ducks ===
On June 8, 2021, Tilson signed with the Long Island Ducks of the Atlantic League of Professional Baseball. In 8 games with Long Island, Tilson slashed .296/.355/.370 with 7 RBI.

=== Philadelphia Phillies ===
On June 19, 2021, Tilson's contract was purchased by the Philadelphia Phillies organization. He elected free agency following the season.

=== Chicago Dogs ===
On February 14, 2022, Tilson signed with the Chicago Dogs of the American Association. Tilson appeared in 92 games for Chicago in 2022, slashing .286/.354/.382 with 5 home runs, 32 RBI, and 20 stolen bases. On February 3, 2023, Tilson was released by the Dogs.

Following his release from the Dogs, Tilson enrolled in DePaul University to pursue a psychology major.

== Coaching career ==
Tilson was hired as a volunteer assistant at Northwestern University's baseball program in late 2020.
