= Bruce Rondón =

Venezuelan baseball player (born 1990)

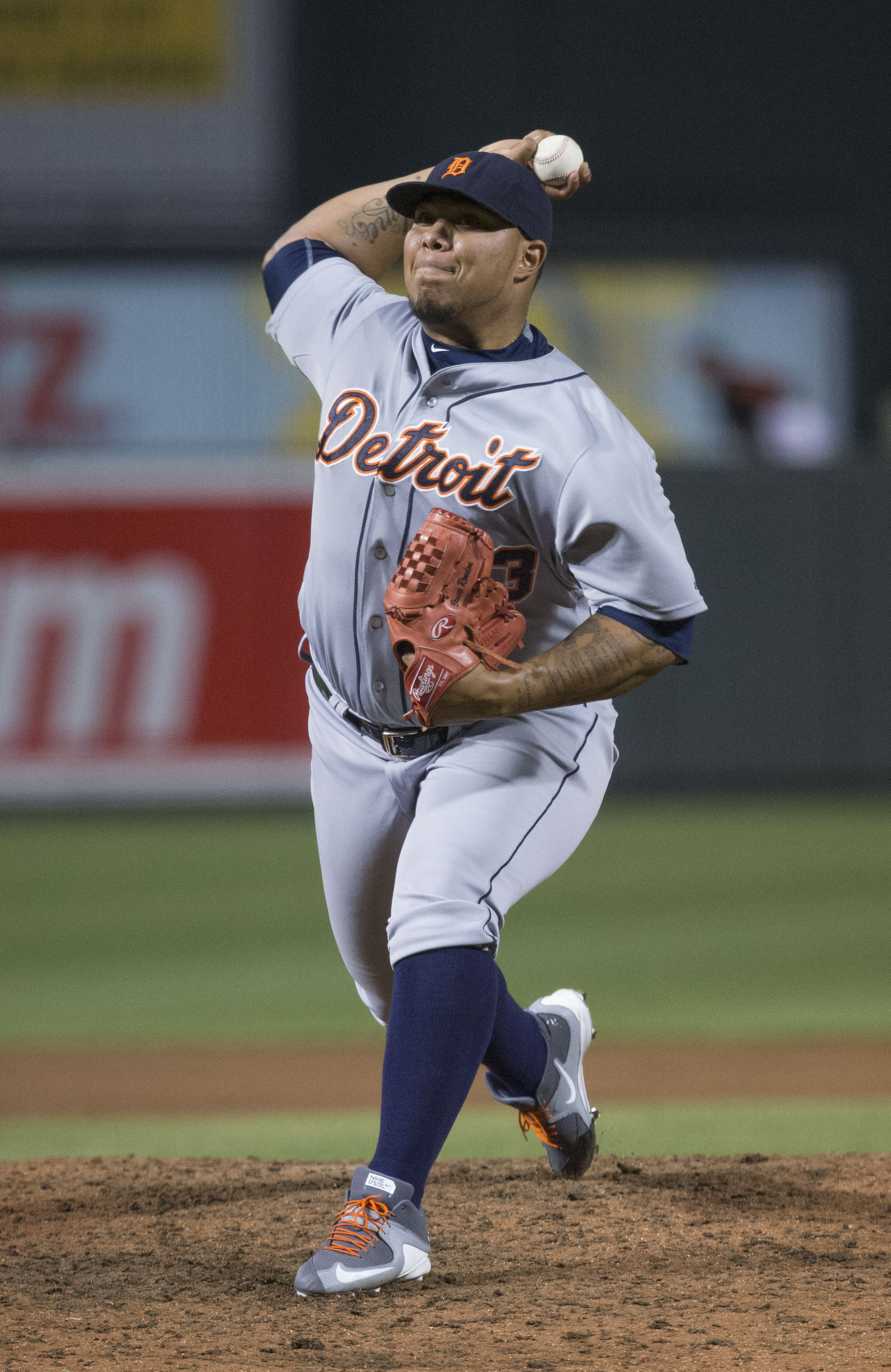
- Rondón pitching for the Detroit Tigers
- Pitcher
- Born: December 9, 1990 (age 35); Valencia, Venezuela
- Batted: Right Threw: Right

MLB debut
- April 25, 2013, for the Detroit Tigers

Last MLB appearance
- July 10, 2018, for the Chicago White Sox

MLB statistics
- Win–loss record: 10–10
- Earned run average: 5.73
- Strikeouts: 173
- Stats at Baseball Reference

Teams
- Detroit Tigers (2013, 2015–2017); Chicago White Sox (2018)

Bruce Rondón (born December 9, 1990) is a Venezuelan former professional baseball pitcher. He has previously played in Major League Baseball (MLB) for the Detroit Tigers in 2013 and from 2015 through 2017 and for the Chicago White Sox in 2018. Rondón's fastball has exceeded 100 miles per hour (160 km/h).

== Playing career ==
=== Early minor league career (2007–2012) ===
Rondón signed with the Detroit Tigers organization as an international free agent on September 12, 2007. He first played with the organization in 2008 as a member of the Venezuelan Summer League Tigers (VSL). He started 13 games, compiling a 2–6 win–loss record and a 3.58 earned run average (ERA). In 2009, Rondón appeared in six games, starting the year with the Gulf Coast League Tigers (GCL). He made three starts, registering an 0–1 record and a 4.76 ERA. On July 10, he rejoined the VSL Tigers and made three relief appearances, posting an ERA of 13.50.

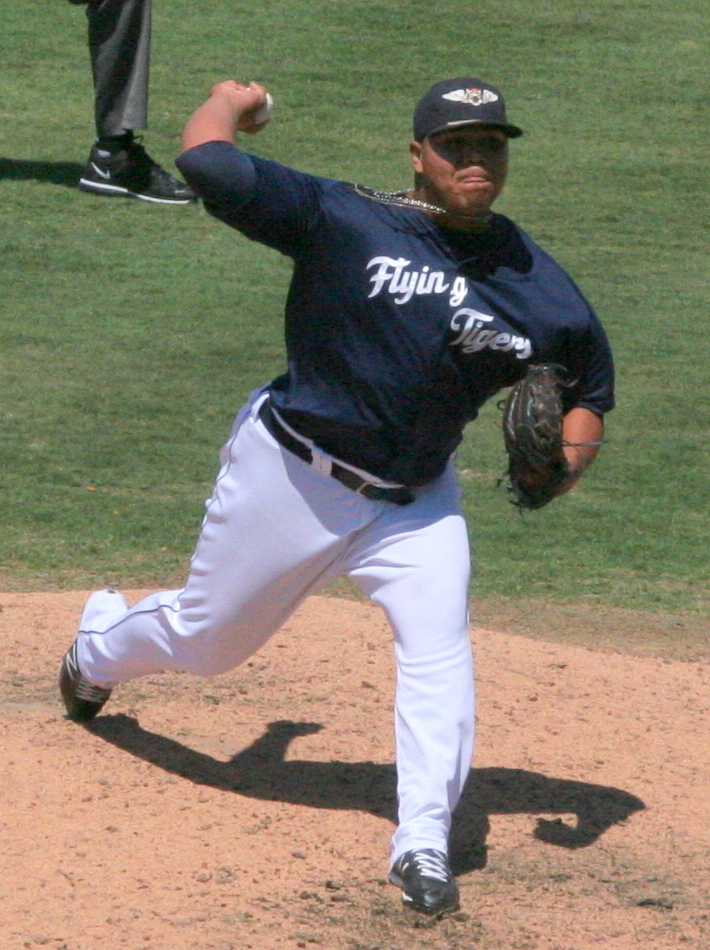
Rondón pitching for the Lakeland Flying Tigers in 2012

Rondón split the 2010 season between the GCL Tigers and the Lakeland Flying Tigers of the Class A-Advanced Florida State League (FSL), appearing in a combined total of 28 games, all of them as a reliever. He made 24 appearances in the GCL, leading the league with 15 saves. Rondón ended the season in the GCL with 20 consecutive scoreless outings and during that stretch, which covered 21 2/3 innings, he struck out 23 opponents. GCL hitters had a .133 batting average against Rondón, the best mark for all GCL relief pitchers in 2010. He was named a GCL all–star in 2010. Rondón finished the minor league season with four appearances for Lakeland, after he joined the Flying Tigers on August 24. Rondón spent all of 2011 with the West Michigan Whitecaps of the Class A Midwest League, appearing in 41 games before trouble with his right shoulder ended his season in August. He gathered 19 saves and posted a 2.03 ERA with the Whitecaps, and was named to appear in the 2011 Midwest League All-Star game Late in the year, Baseball America ranked Rondón as Detroit's 12th-highest prospect. The previous year, he had been rated 13th.

Rondón started the 2012 season on Lakeland's roster, but he was promoted to the Erie SeaWolves of the Class AA Eastern League on June 20 and then to the Toledo Mud Hens of the Class AAA International League on August 7. Between the three teams, Rondón saved 29 games and posted an ERA of 1.53 while striking out 66 opponents. His save total was the third-highest for a minor leaguer. He was named to appear in the 2012 All-Star Futures Game. He retired two hitters on four fastballs, with one fastball registering 102 miles per hour (164 km/h) on the Kaufman Stadium radar gun.

Rondón was recognized as Detroit's Minor League Pitcher of the Year and in June, he was the organization's Minor League Pitcher of the Month. Baseball America picked Rondón as the top reliever in both the Eastern League and the FSL.

=== Detroit Tigers (2013–2017) ===
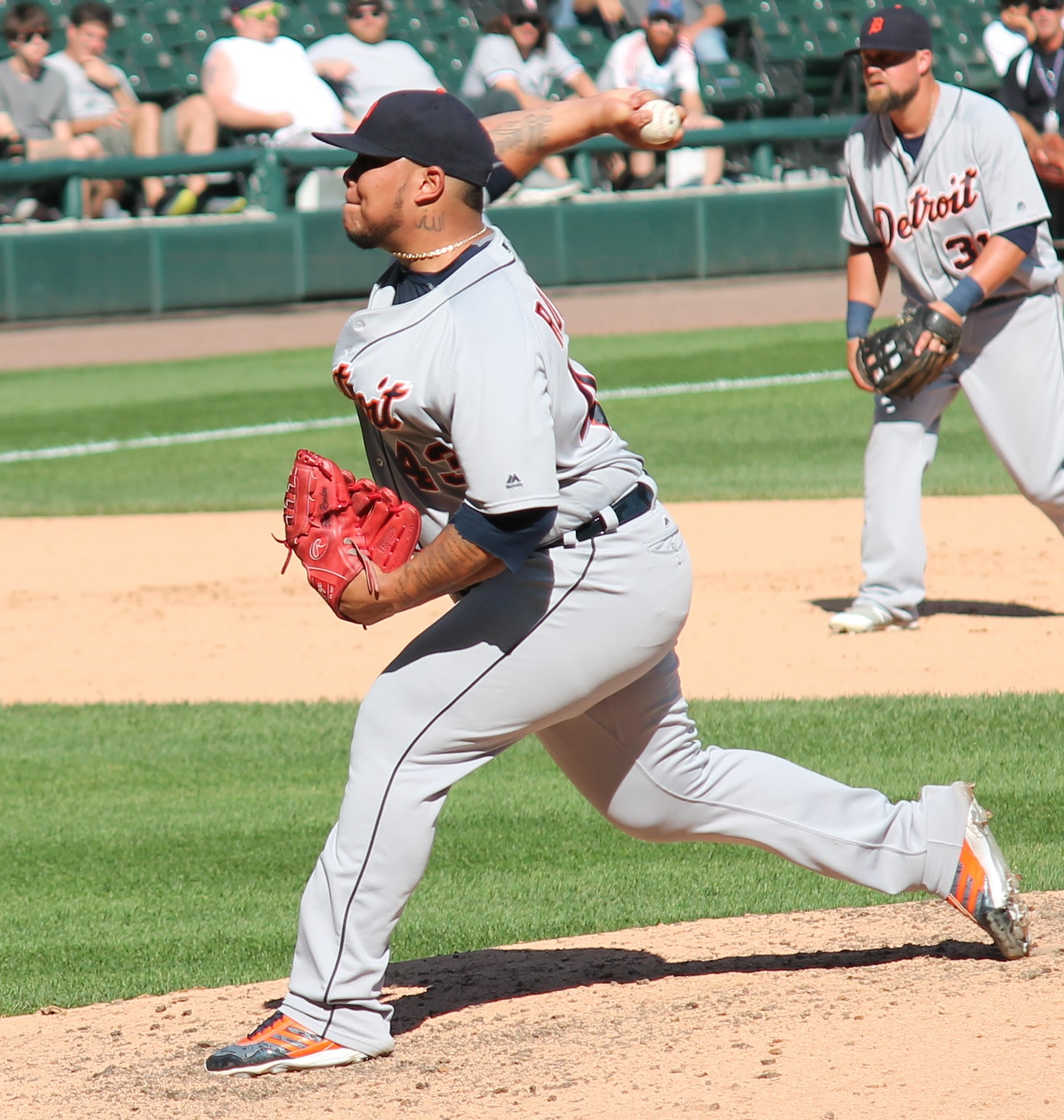
Bruce Rondón, September 2016.

Tigers general manager Dave Dombrowski referred to Rondón as a "rare talent" after the 2012 season, and indicated that he could become the Tigers closer in 2013. Rondón struggled early in spring training, but began to improve with mechanical changes. The Tigers optioned Rondón to Toledo for the start of the 2013 season. They promoted him to the major leagues on April 23, but did not use him as their closer. He made his Major League debut on April 25, 2013 against the Kansas City Royals. He entered the game in relief in the eighth inning. His first batter faced was Billy Butler, who singled to right field. His pitching line for this first inning was two hits, one run scored.

Bruce returned to Toledo in early May, where he posted 14 saves and a 1.52 ERA, with 40 strikeouts and 13 walks in 29 2/3 innings. The Tigers recalled him to the major league club on June 28, 2013. He earned his first major league save on August 30, 2013 against the Cleveland Indians. He posted a 3.45 ERA in his first major league season, striking out 30 batters in 28 2/3 innings.

Expected to be one of the Tigers' primary setup men for 2014, Rondón underwent Tommy John surgery to repair a torn ligament in his right elbow during spring training. After the procedure, Rondón missed the entire 2014 season. He returned to pitch for the Tigers midway through the 2015 season. On September 22, 2015, Rondón was sent home by the Tigers due to their displeasure with his effort level. In 35 appearances this season, he posted a 1–0 record, with five saves in nine opportunities, a 5.81 ERA, a 1.61 WHIP, and 36 strikeouts. In 31 innings, he allowed 31 hits and 19 walks, while issuing a team-high 5.5 walks per nine innings.

Preparing for the 2016 season, Rondón lost 15 pounds (6.8 kg) and made mechanical changes to his delivery. The Tigers optioned Rondón to the Mud Hens on March 28, 2016. Rondón was recalled to the Tigers on June 19, 2016, and he pitched two scoreless innings of relief against the Kansas City Royals. Rondón made 37 relief appearances in the 2016 season, compiling a 5–2 record with a 2.97 ERA and 45 strikeouts in 36 1/3 innings.

On January 13, 2017, the Tigers avoided arbitration with Rondón, agreeing on a one-year, $850,000 contract. He appeared in the 2017 World Baseball Classic for the Venezuelan national baseball team. During the 2017 season, Rondón pitched 15 2/3, allowing 19 runs on 21 hits, before he was demoted to Toledo. The Tigers did not include Rondón in their September call-ups. He was non-tendered and became a free agent on December 1. His major league career with the Tigers ended with a 5.00 ERA and seven saves in 123 relief appearances.

=== Chicago White Sox ===
On February 1, 2018, Rondón signed a minor league contract with the Chicago White Sox. He had his contract purchased on April 8, 2018. He entered the game that same day against the Tigers striking out all four batters he faced. He was designated for assignment on July 12 after posting an ERA of 8.49 in 29 2/3 innings. He elected free agency on July 15, 2018.

=== Mexican League ===
On April 20, 2020, Rondón signed with the Rieleros de Aguascalientes of the Mexican League. Rondón did not play in a game in 2020 due to the cancellation of the Mexican League season because of the COVID-19 pandemic.

On March 10, 2021, Rondón signed with the Sultanes de Monterrey. However, he was released prior to the season on May 5, 2021, due to an injury to his throwing arm. Rondón signed with Aguascalientes for the 2022 season on March 21, 2022. On June 21, 2022, he was traded to the Diablos Rojos del México. He was released on January 19, 2023.

=== Southern Maryland Blue Crabs ===
On July 10, 2023, Rondón signed with the Southern Maryland Blue Crabs of the Atlantic League of Professional Baseball. In 25 games, he went 2–2 with a 2.77 ERA and 31 strikeouts across 26 innings pitched. Rondón became a free agent following the season.

=== Dorados de Chihuahua ===
On June 7, 2024, Rondón signed with the Dorados de Chihuahua of the Mexican League. In nine games for Chihuahua, he struggled to a 9.00 ERA with four strikeouts across eight innings pitched. Rondón was released by the Dorados on June 26.

== Pitching style ==
Rondón relies heavily on a hard four-seam fastball in the 97 to 100 miles per hour (156 to 161 km/h) range, which he frequently throws at or above 100 miles per hour (160 km/h). His other pitches include a slider in the 86 to 89 miles per hour (138 to 143 km/h) range, a changeup in the 89 to 91 miles per hour (143 to 146 km/h) range, and an occasional sinker in the upper 90s, which he is still developing.

== Personal life ==
Rondón is named after Bruce Lee.

== See also ==
- List of Major League Baseball players from Venezuela
