= Jordan Stephens (baseball) =

American baseball player (born 1992)

- Pitcher
- Born: September 12, 1992 (age 34); Houston, Texas, U.S.
- Bats: Right Throws: Right

Jordan Shane Stephens (born September 12, 1992) is an American former professional baseball pitcher. He was drafted by the Chicago White Sox in the 2015 Major League Baseball draft.

== Career ==
Stephens attended Alvin High School in Alvin, Texas and played college baseball at Rice University. In 2014, he underwent Tommy John Surgery and missed most of his junior year. He returned from the injury in 2015 and after the season was drafted by the Chicago White Sox in the fifth round of the 2015 Major League Baseball draft.

=== Chicago White Sox ===
Stephens pitched his first professional season with both the Arizona League White Sox and Great Falls Voyagers, posting a combined 0.51 ERA in 17 2/3 innings pitched between both teams. In 2016, he pitched for the Winston-Salem Dash, pitching to a 7–10 record and 3.45 ERA in 27 games started. He spent 2017 with the Birmingham Barons, posting a 3–7 record with a 3.14 ERA in only 16 starts due to missing the first two months of the season because of tendinitis in his right elbow.

On November 20, 2018, the White Sox added Stephens to their 40-man roster to protect him from the Rule 5 draft. He began 2019 with the Triple-A Charlotte Knights and also played in one game with Winston-Salem.

=== Cleveland Indians ===
Stephens was claimed off waivers by the Cleveland Indians on June 15, 2019. He was subsequently assigned to the Double-A Akron RubberDucks. On August 30, Stephens was designated for assignment by the Indians. He cleared waivers and was sent outright to the Triple-A Columbus Clippers on September 3.

Stephens did not play in a game in 2020 due to the cancellation of the minor league season because of the COVID-19 pandemic. He returned to action in 2021 with the Triple-A Columbus Clippers, compiling a 3-0 record and 4.72 ERA with 48 strikeouts and six saves across 47 2/3 innings pitched. Stephens elected free agency following the season on November 7, 2021.

=== Charleston Dirty Birds ===
On February 17, 2022, Stephens signed with the Charleston Dirty Birds of the Atlantic League of Professional Baseball. He made 13 starts for Charleston, posting a 1-5 record and 5.37 ERA with 52 strikeouts across 67 innings of work. Stephens became a free agent following the season.
