= Carson Fulmer =

American baseball player (born 1993)

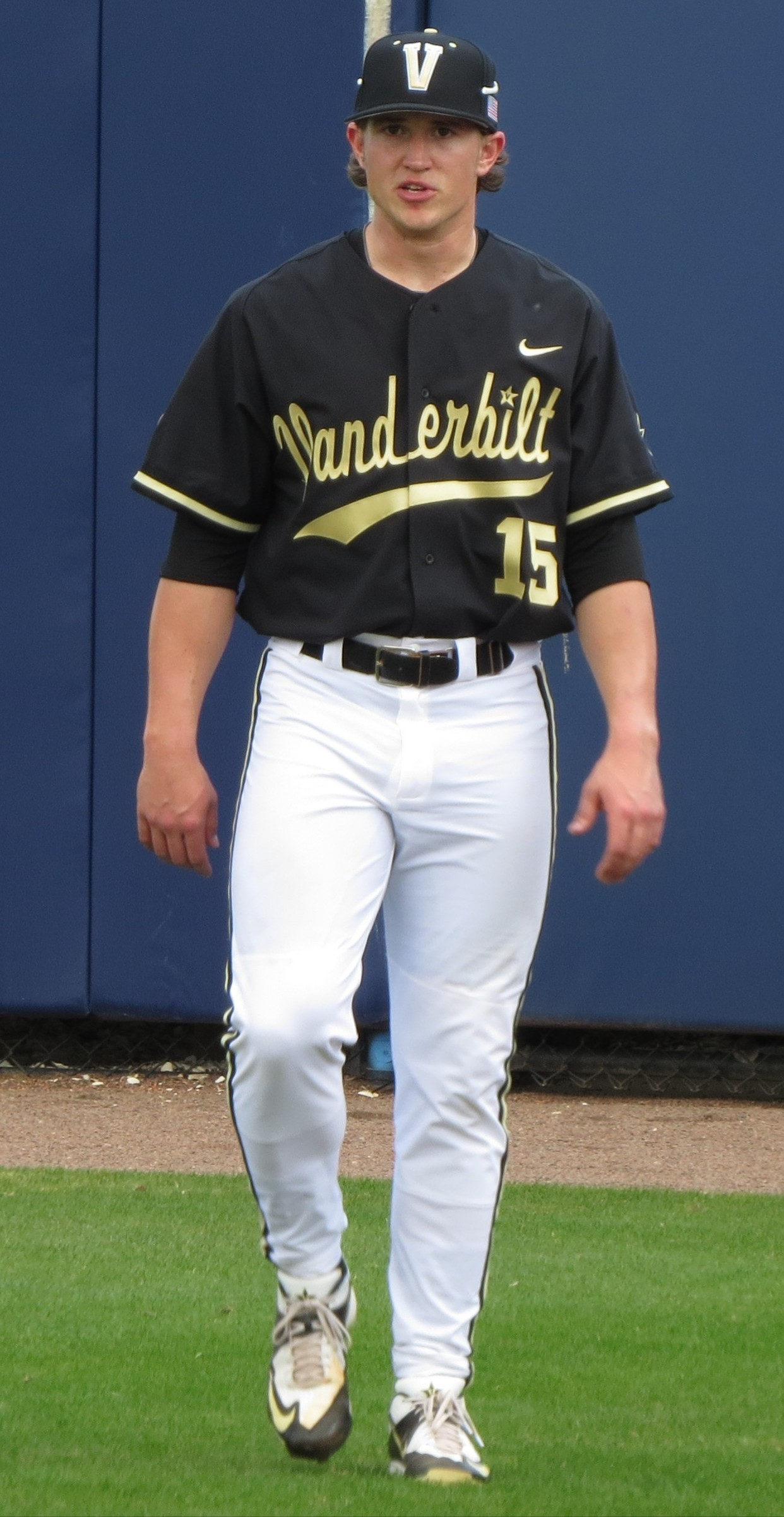
- Fulmer with Vanderbilt

Free agent
- Pitcher
- Born: December 13, 1993 (age 32); Lakeland, Florida, U.S.
- Bats: Right Throws: Right

MLB debut
- July 17, 2016, for the Chicago White Sox

MLB statistics (through 2025 season)
- Win–loss record: 7–15
- Earned run average: 5.44
- Strikeouts: 231
- Stats at Baseball Reference

Teams
- Chicago White Sox (2016–2019); Detroit Tigers (2020); Baltimore Orioles (2020); Cincinnati Reds (2021); Los Angeles Angels (2023–2025)

Carson Springer Fulmer (born December 13, 1993) is an American professional baseball pitcher who is a free agent. He has previously played in Major League Baseball (MLB) for the Chicago White Sox, Detroit Tigers, Baltimore Orioles, Cincinnati Reds, and Los Angeles Angels. He played college baseball for the Vanderbilt Commodores. He was drafted by the White Sox in the first round of the 2015 MLB draft, and he made his MLB debut in 2016.

== Amateur career ==
Fulmer attended All Saints' Academy in Winter Haven, Florida and was drafted by the Boston Red Sox in the 15th round of the 2012 Major League Baseball draft. He did not sign and attended Vanderbilt University.

As a freshman in 2013, Fulmer, appeared in 26 games as a relief pitcher, going 3–0 with a 2.39 earned run average (ERA), four saves and 51 strikeouts in 52 2/3 innings. Fulmer started his sophomore season in 2014 as a relief pitcher, but was moved to the starting rotation in April. After becoming a starter, he had a 28 innings scoreless streak. In June, he helped the Commodores win the 2014 College World Series against the Virginia Cavaliers after allowing only one earned run in 5 1/3 innings of the third game. He finished the season 7–1 in 26 games (10 starts) with a 1.98 ERA, 10 saves and 95 strikeouts in 91 innings, earning the SEC Pitcher of the Year Award. After the season, he played for the United States collegiate national team during the summer.

As a junior in 2015, Fulmer won the National Pitcher of the Year Award after going 14–2 with a 1.83 ERA with 167 strikeouts over 127 2/3 innings. He was a finalist for the 2015 Golden Spikes Award, presented annually to the nation's top college player.

== Professional career ==
=== Chicago White Sox ===
The Chicago White Sox selected Fulmer in the first round, with the eighth overall selection, of the 2015 MLB draft. Fulmer signed with the White Sox, receiving a $3,470,600 signing bonus.

After signing, Fulmer was assigned to the rookie-level Arizona League White Sox, and after one scoreless appearances, he was promoted to the Winston-Salem Dash where he finished the season, posting a 2.05 ERA in eight starts. He began 2016 with the Birmingham Barons.

Fulmer was called up to the major leagues on July 15, 2016. He made his debut on July 17. He was demoted to the Charlotte Knights on August 17 and spent the remainder of the season there. In 21 starts between Birmingham and Charlotte, Fulmer was 6–10 with a 4.63 ERA, and in eight appearances out of the bullpen for the White Sox, he compiled a 0–2 record and 8.49 ERA.

Fulmer began the 2017 season with Charlotte and was recalled to the White Sox for the first time that season on August 21 to make his first major league start. He gave up six earned runs on four hits and three walks in 1 1/3 innings pitched against the Minnesota Twins, and he was sent back to Charlotte the next day. Fulmer was recalled to Chicago once again in September. In 25 starts for Charlotte he was 7–9 with a 5.79 ERA and in seven games (five starts) for Chicago, he pitched to a 3–1 record and 3.86 ERA.

Fulmer began 2018 in Chicago's starting rotation. However, after going 2–4 with an 8.07 ERA and 1.89 WHIP in nine games, he was optioned to Charlotte on May 18. In 2019, Fulmer was 1–2 in 20 games (2 starts). He had an ERA of 6.26 in 27 1/3 innings. On July 23, 2020, Fulmer was designated for assignment by the White Sox.

=== Detroit Tigers ===
On July 25, 2020, Fulmer was claimed off waivers by the Detroit Tigers. He was designated for assignment by the Tigers on August 20, 2020. In his brief time with the Tigers, Fulmer pitched to a 6.75 ERA over 6 2/3 innings and allowed five runs including one home run.

=== Baltimore Orioles ===
On August 24, 2020, Fulmer was claimed off waivers by the Pittsburgh Pirates. Fulmer was designated for assignment by the Pirates on September 2 without appearing in a game. On September 5, Fulmer was claimed off waivers by the Baltimore Orioles. Fulmer did not allow a run over 3 2/3 innings pitched for the Orioles.

On September 21, 2020, Fulmer was again claimed off waivers by the Pittsburgh Pirates. On March 7, 2021, Fulmer was designated for assignment following the acquisition of Duane Underwood Jr.

=== Cincinnati Reds ===
On March 14, 2021, Fulmer was claimed off waivers by the Cincinnati Reds. Fulmer recorded a 6.66 ERA in 20 appearances before being designated for assignment on May 21. He was outrighted to the Triple-A Louisville Bats on May 24.

=== Los Angeles Dodgers ===
On December 8, 2021, the Los Angeles Dodgers selected Fulmer from the Reds in the minor league phase of the Rule 5 draft. The Dodgers added him to the 40-man roster and called him up to the majors on April 30, 2022. He was designated for assignment two days later, without appearing in a major league game for the Dodgers. On May 13, Fulmer was released by the Dodgers. However, the next day, Fulmer re-signed with the Dodgers on a minor league contract.

He returned to Oklahoma City, where on the season he appeared in 49 games with a 6–6 record, a 2.86 ERA and 12 saves. He elected free agency on October 14, 2022.

=== Los Angeles Angels ===
On February 10, 2023, Fulmer signed a minor league contract with the Seattle Mariners organization. Fulmer was released by the Mariners on March 29.

On May 29, 2023, Fulmer signed a minor league contract with the Los Angeles Angels organization. In 12 games (11 starts) for the Triple–A Salt Lake Bees, he recorded a 5.27 ERA with 33 strikeouts in 41.0 innings of work. On September 24, the Angels selected Fulmer's contract, adding him to the major league roster. In three appearances for the team, he logged a 2.70 ERA with 6 strikeouts in 10.0 innings of work. Following the season on October 16, Fulmer was removed from the 40–man roster and sent outright to Triple–A Salt Lake. He elected free agency the following day.

Fulmer rejoined the Angels on a new minor league contract on February 9, 2024. On April 8, after one start for Salt Lake, he was selected to the major league roster. In 37 appearances for the Angels, he logged an 0–5 record and 4.15 ERA with 81 strikeouts across 86 2/3 innings pitched. On October 24, Fulmer was removed from the 40–man roster and sent outright to Salt Lake. He elected free agency on October 28.

=== Pittsburgh Pirates ===
On December 13, 2024, Fulmer signed a minor league contract with the Pittsburgh Pirates. He made 13 appearances (six starts) for the Triple-A Indianapolis Indians, posting a 1-3 record and 4.64 ERA with 38 strikeouts across 42 2/3 innings pitched. Fulmer was released by the Pirates organization on June 2.

=== Los Angeles Angels (second stint) ===
On June 4, 2025, Fulmer signed a minor league contract with the Los Angeles Angels. In nine appearances for the Triple-A Salt Lake Bees, he logged a 1-0 record and 1.54 with ERA with 12 strikeouts across 11 2/3 innings pitched. On July 9, the Angels selected Fulmer's contract, adding him to their active roster. In 13 appearances for Los Angeles, he recorded a 5.83 ERA with 26 strikeouts across 29 1/3 innings pitched. On August 24, Fulmer was placed on the injured list due to right elbow inflammation. He was transferred to the 60-day injured list on September 1, officially ending his season. On October 22, Fulmer was removed from the 40-man roster and sent outright to Salt Lake; he subsequently rejected the assignment and elected free agency.

=== Pittsburgh Pirates (second stint) ===
On February 23, 2026, Fulmer returned to the Pittsburgh Pirates organization on a minor league contract. He was assigned to the Triple-A Indianapolis Indians to begin the season, where he posted a 2-2 record and 6.35 ERA with 27 strikeouts over 34 innings of work.

=== Seattle Mariners ===
On June 9, 2026, Fulmer was traded to the Seattle Mariners organization. In 18 starts with Triple-A Tacoma Rainiers he threw 93.2 innings going 5-3 with a 4.71 ERA and 72 strikeouts. He elected free agency on November 2.

== Personal ==
Fulmer married his high school sweetheart, Sabina Vargas, in November 2017 in Malibu, California.

== See also ==
- Rule 5 draft results
