= Caleb Frare =

American baseball player (born 1993)

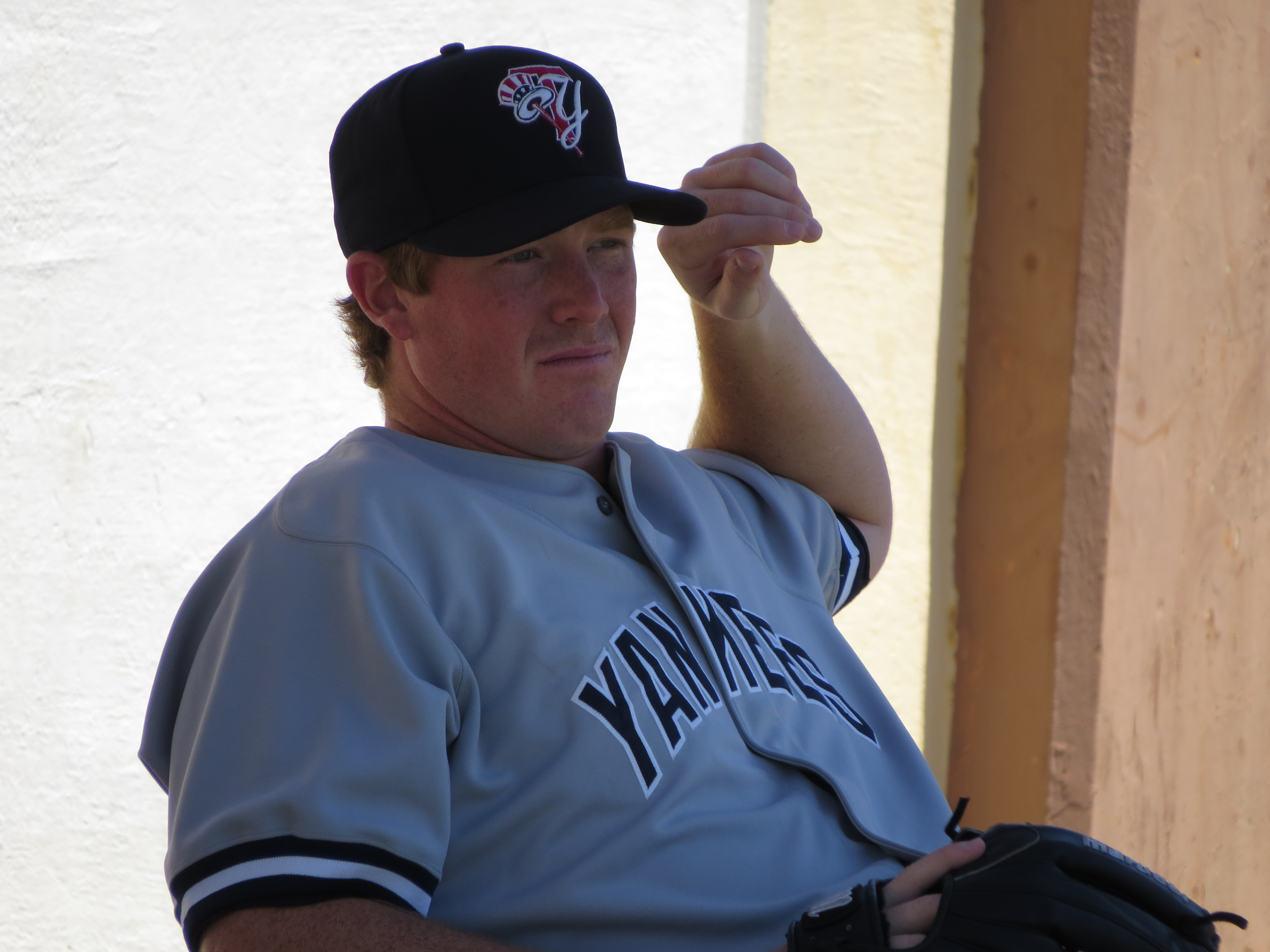
- Frare with the Tampa Yankees
- Pitcher
- Born: July 8, 1993 (age 33); Miles City, Montana, U.S.
- Batted: Left Threw: Left

MLB debut
- September 2, 2018, for the Chicago White Sox

Last MLB appearance
- May 5, 2019, for the Chicago White Sox

MLB statistics
- Win–loss record: 0–1
- Earned run average: 6.52
- Strikeouts: 12
- Stats at Baseball Reference

Teams
- Chicago White Sox (2018–2019)

Caleb Michael Frare (born July 8, 1993) is an American former professional baseball pitcher. He played in Major League Baseball (MLB) for the Chicago White Sox.

== Career ==
Frare attended Custer County High School in Miles City, Montana. Since his high school did not offer baseball, he played for the Outlaws Baseball Club.

=== New York Yankees ===
He was drafted by the New York Yankees in the 11th round of the 2012 Major League Baseball draft, and he signed, forgoing his commitment to play college baseball at the University of Utah.

Frare made his professional debut with the Gulf Coast Yankees, posting a 2-1 record with a 2.74 ERA in 23 innings. He did not pitch in 2013 and 2014 while rehabbing from Tommy John Surgery and a quadriceps tear. He returned from the injury in 2015 to pitch for both the Charleston RiverDogs and Tampa Yankees, pitching to a combined 6-3 record and 2.91 ERA in 55.2 total relief innings pitched. He pitched 2016 with Tampa, going 3-3 with a 0.92 ERA in 32 relief appearances, and played 2017 with Tampa and the Trenton Thunder, compiling a 3-4 record and 4.02 ERA in 62.2 total relief innings pitched between the two clubs. Frare started 2018 with Trenton.

=== Chicago White Sox ===
On July 29, 2018, the Yankees traded Frare to the White Sox for $1.5 million of international signing bonus pool space. The White Sox assigned him to the Charlotte Knights of the Class AAA International League, and promoted him to the major leagues on September 1.

Frare was non-tendered by Chicago on December 2, 2019, and became a free agent. On December 3, he re-signed with Chicago on a minor league contract. Frare was released by the White Sox organization on June 26, 2020. At the time of his release, Frare had appeared in 16 games in the major leagues, with an 11.2 K/9 and a 6.52 ERA with 12 strikeouts in 9.2 relief innings.

=== Sioux Falls Canaries ===
On March 30, 2021, Frare signed with the Sioux Falls Canaries of the American Association of Professional Baseball. In 27 games 27.2 innings of relief he struggled mightily going 0-5 with a 7.48 ERA with 39 strikeouts. He was released on January 27, 2022.
