= Ryan Cordell =

American baseball player (born 1992)

- Outfielder
- Born: March 31, 1992 (age 34); Sacramento, California, U.S.
- Batted: Right Threw: Right

MLB debut
- September 3, 2018, for the Chicago White Sox

Last MLB appearance
- September 27, 2020, for the New York Mets

MLB statistics
- Batting average: .202
- Home runs: 8
- Runs batted in: 28
- Stats at Baseball Reference

Teams
- Chicago White Sox (2018–2019); New York Mets (2020)

Ryan Thomas Cordell (born March 31, 1992) is an American former professional baseball outfielder. He played in Major League Baseball (MLB) for the Chicago White Sox and New York Mets.

== Professional career ==
Cordell attended Valley Christian Academy in Roseville, California, graduating in 2010. He attended Liberty University and played college baseball for the Liberty Flames.

=== Texas Rangers ===
The Texas Rangers drafted Cordell in the 11th round, with the 340th overall selection, of the 2013 Major League Baseball draft. He made his professional debut with the Low–A Spokane Indians, posting a .248 batting average in 64 games.

In 2014, Cordell started the baseball season with the Hickory Crawdads of the Single–A South Atlantic League and was later promoted to the Myrtle Beach Pelicans of the High–A Carolina League in late August of that year. In 89 games between the two teams he batted .318 with 13 home runs and 59 RBI. Prior to the 2015 season, he was converted from an outfielder to shortstop. He started the 2015 season with the High Desert Mavericks of the High–A California League and was moved midseason to finish with the Frisco RoughRiders of the Double–A Texas League, transferring back to outfield and utility player status. In 124 games, he slashed .270/.327/.444 with 18 home runs and 75 RBI. After the 2015 season, Cordell was brought up as a reserve batter for the Round Rock Express of the Triple–A Pacific Coast League (PCL) in their championship series in September 2015.

In 2016, Cordell began the season with Frisco, where he posted two grand slams in the first 13 games of the season, to join Bryce Harper of the Washington Nationals as one of only two players in professional baseball to net two grand slams in the first three weeks of the 2016 season, a feat which garnered him Texas League Player of the Month for April 2016.

=== Milwaukee Brewers ===
The Milwaukee Brewers acquired Cordell on September 5, 2016, as the player to be named later from the August 1 trade for Jonathan Lucroy and Jeremy Jeffress. Cordell finished 2016 with a .264 batting average with 19 home runs and 70 RBI. The Brewers added him to their 40-man roster after the season, in order to protect him from the Rule 5 draft. He began the 2017 season with the Colorado Springs Sky Sox of the PCL, batting .284 with ten home runs and 45 RBI in 68 games.

=== Chicago White Sox ===
On July 25, 2017, Cordell was traded to the Chicago White Sox in exchange for pitcher Anthony Swarzak. He did not play the rest of the season after being acquired by Chicago due to injury.

Cordell began 2018 with the Charlotte Knights of the Triple–A International League. The White Sox promoted Cordell to the major leagues on September 3, 2018, and he made his major league debut that day as a pinch runner. In 19 games during his rookie campaign, he batted .108/.125/.216 with one home run and four RBI.

Cordell made 97 appearances for the White Sox in 2019, slashing .221/.290/.355 with seven home runs, 24 RBI, and three stolen bases. On October 28, 2019, Cordell was removed from the 40–man roster and sent outright to Triple–A Charlotte. He elected free agency following the season on November 4.

=== New York Mets ===
On January 3, 2020, Cordell signed a minor league contract with the New York Mets. Cordell had his contract selected to the 40-man roster on July 29. Cordell was designated for assignment on August 5. On September 26, Cordell was selected back to the active roster. On October 26, Cordell was designated for assignment by the Mets following the acquisition of Robel García. He elected free agency on October 28.

=== Philadelphia Phillies ===
On April 26, 2021, Cordell signed a minor league contract with the Philadelphia Phillies organization. Cordell played in 57 games for the Triple-A Lehigh Valley IronPigs, slashing .198/.292/.411 with 12 home runs and 28 RBI. On July 22, Cordell was released by the Phillies.

=== Gastonia Honey Hunters ===
On August 10, 2021, Cordell signed with the Gastonia Honey Hunters of the Atlantic League of Professional Baseball. In 39 games, he slashed .231/.359/.471 with 7 home runs and 23 RBI. Cordell became a free agent after the season.

== Coaching career ==
In January 2022, Cordell was hired to serve as an assistant baseball coach at Liberty University.
