= Jace Fry =

American baseball player (born 1993)

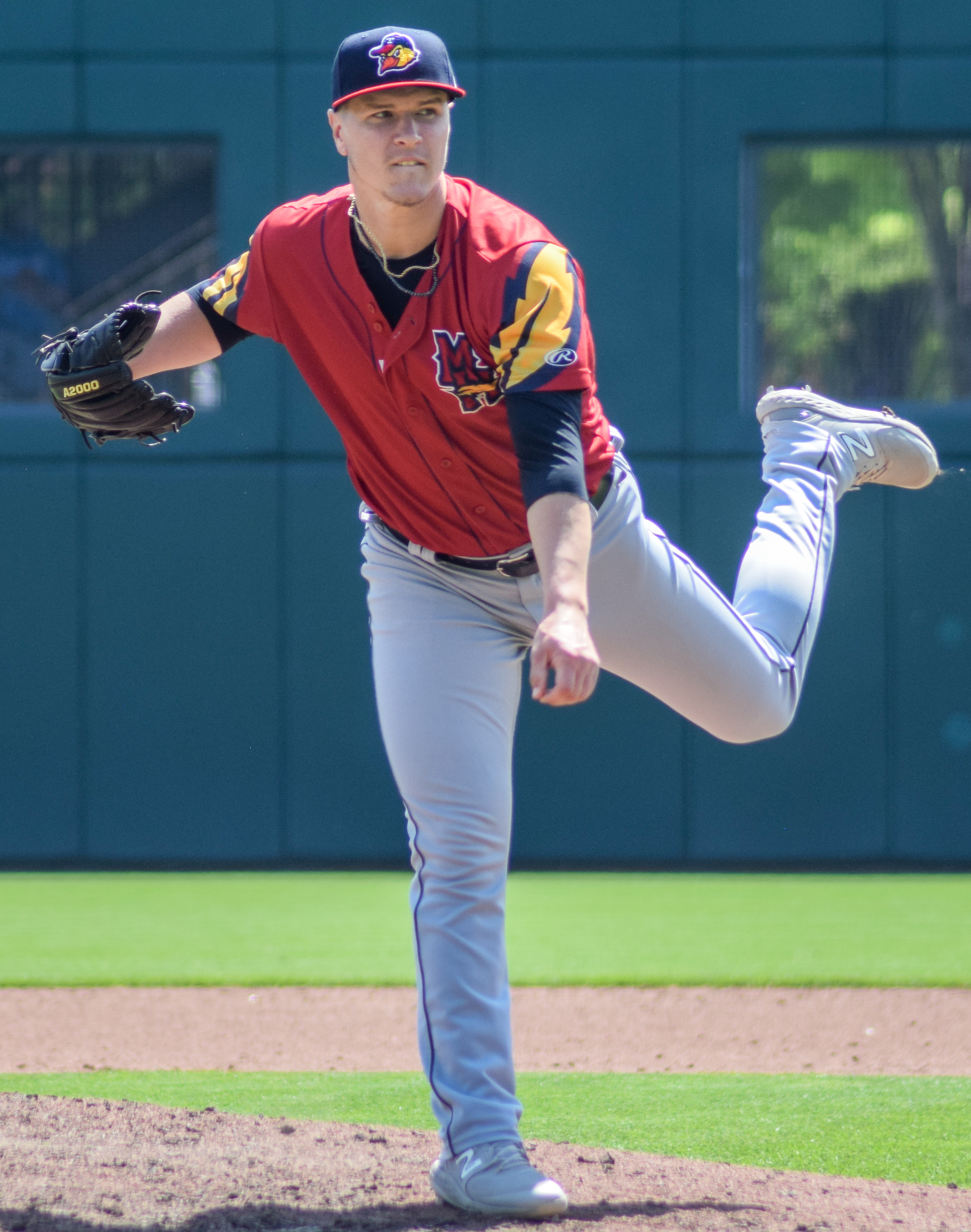
- Fry with the Toledo Mud Hens in 2023
- Pitcher
- Born: July 9, 1993 (age 33); Beaverton, Oregon, U.S.
- Batted: Left Threw: Left

MLB debut
- September 5, 2017, for the Chicago White Sox

Last MLB appearance
- September 21, 2021, for the Chicago White Sox

MLB statistics
- Win–loss record: 5–9
- Earned run average: 5.04
- Strikeouts: 168
- Stats at Baseball Reference

Teams
- Chicago White Sox (2017–2021)

Jace Hayden Fry (born July 9, 1993) is an American former professional baseball pitcher. He played in Major League Baseball (MLB) for the Chicago White Sox. Prior to his professional career, he played college baseball for the Oregon State Beavers.

== Amateur career ==
Growing up in Beaverton, Oregon, Fry played Little League Baseball. His team, Murrayhill Little League, represented the Northwest in the 2006 Little League World Series, where the team made it to the U.S. championship game.

Fry graduated from Southridge High School in Beaverton, and committed to enroll at Oregon State University on a college baseball scholarship. The Oakland Athletics selected Fry in the ninth round of the 2011 Major League Baseball (MLB) draft, but Oakland did not offer Fry a sufficient signing bonus to convince him to forego college. Over the summer of 2011, Fry pitched in collegiate summer baseball for the Corvallis Knights of the West Coast League (WCL). Fry injured his back in the WCL championship game, and required surgery.

In his freshman year with the Oregon State Beavers baseball team, he had a 5–3 win–loss record and a 2.45 earned run average (ERA) in 13 games started. In June 2012, he underwent Tommy John surgery after a 75% tear of the ulnar collateral ligament of the elbow. Baseball America named Fry a Second Team Freshman All-American. After recovering from surgery, Fry pitched to a 0–1 record with a 4.70 ERA in six appearances in 2013. During the 2014 season, he pitched a no-hitter on March 8 against the Northern Illinois Huskies. He finished the season with a record of 11–2 and a 1.80 ERA. He was named the Pac-12 Conference Baseball Pitcher of the Year. Collegiate Baseball named Fry a First Team All-American.

== Professional career ==
=== Chicago White Sox ===
The Chicago White Sox selected Fry in the third round, with the 77th overall selection, of the 2014 MLB draft. He signed with the White Sox, receiving a $760,000 signing bonus, and assigned him to make his professional debut with the Great Falls Voyagers of the Rookie-level Pioneer League and spent the whole season there, posting a 1–0 record and 2.79 ERA in 9 2/3 innings. Fry began the 2015 season with the Winston-Salem Dash of the High-A Carolina League. In June 2015, he underwent his second Tommy John surgery. Prior to his surgery, he was 1–8 with a 3.63 ERA in ten starts. He missed the 2016 season while rehabilitating from the surgery. The White Sox invited Fry to spring training in 2017. In 2017, he pitched for the Birmingham Barons of the Double-A Southern League where he went 2–1 with a 2.78 ERA with 52 strikeouts in 45 1/3 relief innings pitched.

On September 5, 2017, Fry was selected to the 40-man roster and promoted to the major leagues for the first time. He made 11 appearances for Chicago during his rookie campaign, struggling to a 10.80 ERA with three strikeouts across 6 2/3 innings pitched. In 2018, his first full season with the team, Fry recorded a 4.38 ERA with 70 strikeouts and 20 walks in 51 1/3 innings. The following season, Fry's ERA regressed to 4.75 as he walked 43 batters in 55 innings; he also logged a 3-4 record and 68 strikeouts.

With the 2020 Chicago White Sox, Fry appeared in 18 games, compiling a 0–1 record with 3.66 ERA and 24 strikeouts in 19 2/3 innings pitched.

In January 2021, Fry underwent a microdiscectomy, making him likely to miss the first month of the season. On April 8, Fry was placed on the 60-day injured list. He was activated on June 26, and optioned to the Triple-A Charlotte Knights. Fry posted a 10.80 ERA in 6 appearances with Chicago in 2021. On November 5, Fry was outrighted off of the 40-man roster and elected free agency.

=== Washington Nationals ===
On March 19, 2022, Fry signed a minor league contract with the Washington Nationals. Fry made 15 appearances for the Triple-A Rochester Red Wings, working to a 3–0 record and 3.77 ERA with 20 strikeouts in 14 1/3 innings pitched. He was released by the Nationals organization on June 22.

=== Philadelphia Phillies ===
On June 29, 2022, Fry signed a minor league contract with the Philadelphia Phillies organization. Fry pitched in 18 games for the Triple-A Lehigh Valley IronPigs, but struggled to a 1–2 record and 6.75 ERA with 20 strikeouts in 16 innings of work. He elected free agency following the season on November 10.

=== Detroit Tigers ===
On February 15, 2023, Fry signed a minor league contract with the Detroit Tigers organization. Fry made 7 appearances for the Triple–A Toledo Mud Hens before he was placed on the injured list with left elbow inflammation on April 27. On June 8, Fry was released by the Tigers organization.
