= Rick Hahn =

American baseball executive

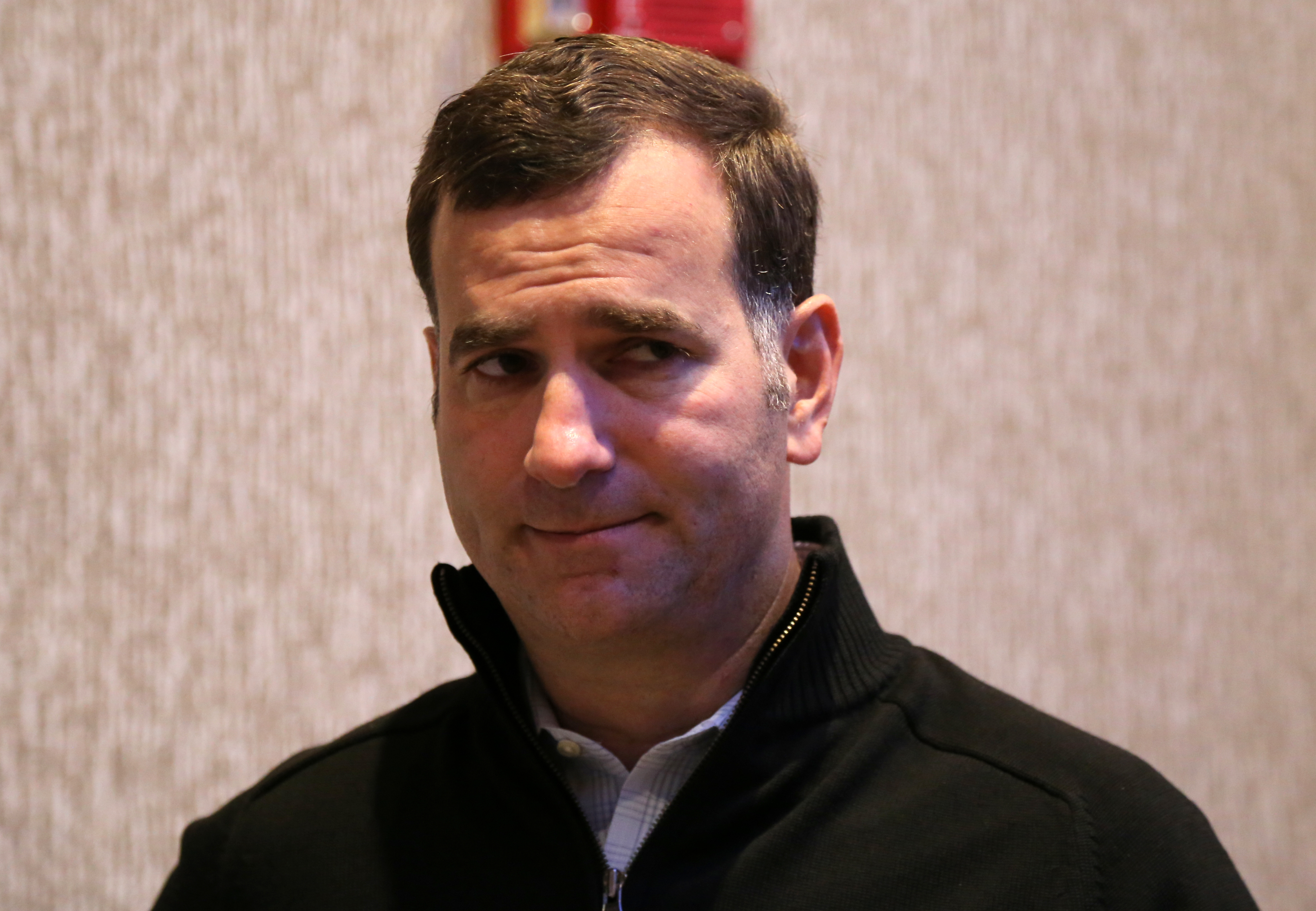
- Hahn at the 2015 Baseball Winter Meetings
- Born: March 20, 1971 (age 55); Winnetka, Illinois, U.S.
- Education: University of Michigan (BA); Harvard Law School (JD); Kellogg School of Management (MBA)
- Awards: Sporting News Executive of the Year (2020)

Rick Hahn (born March 20, 1971) is an American former baseball executive who most recently served as the Senior Vice President/General Manager of the Chicago White Sox of Major League Baseball.

== Early life ==
Hahn was raised in Winnetka, Illinois, and graduated from New Trier High School. He then went on to receive his undergraduate degree from the University of Michigan, his Juris Doctor from Harvard Law School and his Master of Business Administration from the Kellogg School of Management.

His aspirations of becoming a baseball executive were spurred on early in life at age eleven when he wrote a letter to Dallas Green, the Chicago Cubs Vice President and General Manager at the time, suggesting possible trades, and Green responded to him in the form of a letter.

== Career ==
Hahn began his professional career as an agent at Steinberg, Moorad and Dunn in 2000. He worked there for two years before joining the White Sox in 2002.

Following the 2007 season, Hahn withdrew his name from consideration for the General Manager's job of the St. Louis Cardinals, who eventually named John Mozeliak to the position, and he also declined the opportunity to interview for the Pittsburgh Pirates GM job prior to Neal Huntington being named to that post. Additionally, the White Sox declined Hahn permission to interview for the Seattle Mariners GM job following the 2008 season.

During the 2008 season, Baseball Prospectus had named Hahn one of the top-ten GM candidates in the game. In July 2011, SportsIllustrated.com ranked Hahn as the No. 1 General Manager Candidate in Major League Baseball. Similarly, in March 2010, Baseball America named Hahn the No. 1 General Manager prospect in baseball.

On October 26, 2012, the White Sox promoted Kenny Williams from general manager to executive vice president, and promoted Hahn from assistant general manager to general manager.

Following the 2020 season, in which the White Sox made their first post-season appearance since 2008, Hahn was voted winner of the Sporting News Executive of the Year Award by a panel of his peers. Hahn joined Roland Hemond (1972) and Bill Veeck (1977) to become only the third White Sox executive to win the honor in the 85-year history of the award. During Hahn's tenure, the White Sox made the post-season in back-to-back seasons for the first time in the franchise's 121-year history when they won the 2021 American League Central Division, with a record of 86–66.

The White Sox fired Hahn and Williams on August 22, 2023. This was amidst a season in which the White Sox would go on to lose 101 games.

== Personal life ==
Hahn resides in Glencoe, Illinois with his wife Jean and their two sons. Hahn is Jewish.
