= 2017 Detroit Tigers season =

Major League Baseball season

2017 Detroit Tigers
- League: American League
- Division: Central
- Ballpark: Comerica Park
- City: Detroit, Michigan
- Record: 64–98 (.395)
- Divisional place: 5th
- Owners: Christopher Ilitch; Ilitch family trust
- General managers: Al Avila
- Managers: Brad Ausmus
- Television: Fox Sports Detroit (Mario Impemba, Rod Allen, Kirk Gibson)
- Radio: Detroit Tigers Radio Network (Dan Dickerson, Jim Price)
- Stats: ESPN.com; Baseball Reference

The 2017 Detroit Tigers season was the team's 117th season. This was the team's fourth and final year under manager Brad Ausmus. This was the first season without owner Mike Ilitch, who bought the team in 1992 and died on February 10, 2017. The Tigers 2017 uniform features a "Mr. I" patch to honor him, the grounds crew wrote "Mr. I" in the outfield of Comerica Park, and he was also honored during a ceremony at the Tigers home opener on April 7.

On September 12, the Tigers were eliminated from playoff contention for the third consecutive season. On September 22, the Tigers announced manager Brad Ausmus will not return in 2018. The team finished last in the AL Central, last in the league and tied with the San Francisco Giants for the worst record in MLB at 64–98, the team's lowest win total since 2003. Because the Tigers held a tiebreaker over the Giants, they received the first pick in the 2018 MLB draft.

This was ace pitcher Justin Verlander's last season with his initial stint with the Tigers, having been with the team since 2005. He was traded to the Houston Astros on August 31. Verlander was the last remaining member of the 2006 American League Champion team, but would later return to the team in 2026.

== Roster moves ==
=== Coaching staff ===
- On October 5, the Tigers announced that they will exercise their 2017 option on manager Brad Ausmus.
- On October 8, it was announced hitting coach Wally Joyner will not return for 2017.
- On October 20, the Tigers named Lloyd McClendon hitting coach. McClendon is in his second stint on the Tigers coaching staff, after serving as the Tigers' hitting coach from 2007 to 2013. The Tigers also named longtime hitting coach of the Toledo Mud Hens, Leon Durham, assistant hitting coach, succeeding David Newhan.

=== Signings ===
- On December 8, the Tigers selected relief pitcher Daniel Stumpf in the major league round of the Rule 5 draft.
- On December 9, the Tigers signed second baseman Omar Infante to a minor league contract.
- On December 23, the Tigers signed catcher Alex Avila to a one-year, $2 million contract.
- On January 13, the Tigers avoided arbitration when they reached one-year deals with third baseman Nick Castellanos, utility player Andrew Romine, shortstop José Iglesias, and pitchers Bruce Rondón, Alex Wilson and Justin Wilson.

=== Releases ===
- On December 26, free agent pitcher Bobby Parnell left the Tigers and signed a minor-league contract with the Kansas City Royals.
- On January 24, free agent catcher Jarrod Saltalamacchia left the Tigers and signed a one-year, $1.25 million contract with the Toronto Blue Jays.
- On February 7, free agent shortstop Erick Aybar left the Tigers and signed a one-year, $1.75 million contract with the San Diego Padres.
- On March 26, the Tigers released pitcher Mark Lowe with $5.5 million still owed on his contract.
- On March 30, the Tigers released pitcher Mike Pelfrey with $8 million still owed on his contract.
- On June 23, the Tigers released pitcher Francisco Rodríguez.

=== Trades ===
- On November 3, the Tigers traded outfielder Cameron Maybin to the Los Angeles Angels in exchange for minor league pitcher Victor Alcántara.
- On January 18, the Tigers acquired outfielder Mikie Mahtook from the Tampa Bay Rays in exchange for a player to be named later or cash considerations. On April 28, it was announced the Tigers traded minor-league pitcher Drew Smith to complete the trade.
- On July 18, the Tigers traded outfielder J. D. Martinez to the Arizona Diamondbacks in exchange for third baseman Dawel Lugo, and shortstops Sergio Alcantara and Jose King.
- On July 31, the Tigers traded catcher Alex Avila and pitcher Justin Wilson to the Chicago Cubs in exchange for infielders Jeimer Candelario and Isaac Paredes, and a player to be named later or cash considerations.
- On August 31, the Tigers traded outfielder Justin Upton to the Los Angeles Angels in exchange for minor league pitcher Grayson Long and a player to be named later. On September 15, the Tigers acquired pitcher Elvin Rodriguez to complete the trade.
- On August 31, the Tigers traded pitcher Justin Verlander, along with a player to be named later or cash considerations, to the Houston Astros in exchange for pitcher Franklin Pérez, outfielder Daz Cameron, and catcher Jake Rogers. On October 13, the Astros acquired outfielder Juan Ramirez to complete the trade.

== Spring training ==
The Tigers ended spring training with a 14–21 win–loss record, excluding two tie games that did not count toward the standings. Their .400 winning percentage was the joint-worst (along with Toronto) among American League teams in pre-season.

== Season standings ==
=== American League Central ===
AL Central
Team	W	L	Pct.	GB	Home	Road
Cleveland Indians	102	60	.630	—	49‍–‍32	53‍–‍28
Minnesota Twins	85	77	.525	17	41‍–‍40	44‍–‍37
Kansas City Royals	80	82	.494	22	43‍–‍38	37‍–‍44
Chicago White Sox	67	95	.414	35	39‍–‍42	28‍–‍53
Detroit Tigers	64	98	.395	38	34‍–‍47	30‍–‍51

=== Record against opponents ===
2017 American League record Source: MLB Standings Grid – 2017
Team	BAL	BOS	CWS	CLE	DET	HOU	KC	LAA	MIN	NYY	OAK	SEA	TB	TEX	TOR	NL
Baltimore	—	10–9	4–3	1–6	3–4	1–5	3–3	2–4	2–5	7–12	4–3	4–2	8–11	6–1	12–7	8–12
Boston	9–10	—	6–1	4–3	3–4	3–4	2–4	2–4	5–2	8–11	3–4	3–3	11–8	5–1	13–6	16–4
Chicago	3–4	1–6	—	6–13	10–9	4–2	10–9	3–4	7–12	3–4	1–5	3–4	3–3	4–3	3–3	6–14
Cleveland	6–1	3–4	13–6	—	13–6	5–1	12–7	6–0	12–7	5–2	3–4	4–2	4–3	6–1	4–2	6–14
Detroit	4–3	4–3	9–10	6–13	—	3–4	8–11	3–4	8–11	3–3	1–5	1–6	2–5	1–5	3–3	8–12
Houston	5–1	4–3	2–4	1–5	4–3	—	3–4	12–7	5–1	5–2	12–7	14–5	3–4	12–7	4–3	15–5
Kansas City	3–3	4–2	9–10	7–12	11–8	4–3	—	6–1	8–11	2–5	3–3	5–2	4–3	1–6	3–3	9–11
Los Angeles	4–2	4–2	4–3	0–6	4–3	7–12	1–6	—	2–5	4–2	12–7	12–7	3–4	8–11	4–3	11–9
Minnesota	5–2	2–5	12–7	7–12	11–8	1–5	11–8	5–2	—	2–4	3–3	3–4	2–4	4–3	4–3	13–7
New York	12–7	11–8	4–3	2–5	3–3	2–5	5–2	2–4	4–2	—	2–5	5–2	12–7	3–3	9–10	15–5
Oakland	3–4	4–3	5–1	4–3	5–1	7–12	3–3	7–12	3–3	5–2	—	7–12	2–5	10–9	2–5	7–13
Seattle	2–4	3–3	4–3	2–4	6–1	5–14	2–5	7–12	4–3	2–5	12–7	—	5–1	11–8	1–6	12–8
Tampa Bay	11–8	8–11	3–3	3–4	5–2	4–3	3–4	4–3	4–2	7–12	5–2	1–5	—	2–4	9–10	11–9
Texas	1–6	1–5	3–4	1–6	5–1	7–12	6–1	11–8	3–4	3–3	9–10	8–11	4–2	—	3–4	14–6
Toronto	7–12	6–13	3–3	2–4	3–3	3–4	3–3	3–4	3–4	10–9	5–2	6–1	10–9	4–3	—	9–11

Division leaders
Team	W	L	Pct.
Cleveland Indians	102	60	.630
Houston Astros	101	61	.623
Boston Red Sox	93	69	.574

Wild Card teams (Top 2 teams qualify for postseason)
Team	W	L	Pct.	GB
New York Yankees	91	71	.562	+6
Minnesota Twins	85	77	.525	—
Kansas City Royals	80	82	.494	5
Los Angeles Angels	80	82	.494	5
Tampa Bay Rays	80	82	.494	5
Seattle Mariners	78	84	.481	7
Texas Rangers	78	84	.481	7
Toronto Blue Jays	76	86	.469	9
Baltimore Orioles	75	87	.463	10
Oakland Athletics	75	87	.463	10
Chicago White Sox	67	95	.414	18
Detroit Tigers	64	98	.395	21

== Season highlights ==
=== Team accomplishments ===
- On April 16, the Tigers established a franchise record by hitting at least one home run in each of the team's first 12 games of the season. The streak was extended to 13 games on April 18, before the Tigers went homerless on April 19. It was the second-longest streak in Major League history, one shy of the record set by the 2002 Cleveland Indians at 14 games.
- On April 25, the Tigers scored 19 runs in the game, it marked the first time the team has scored 13 or more runs in consecutive games since 1993. The Tigers' 19 runs, including nine-runs in the fifth inning, were the most in a game since 2008. The Tigers recorded 24 hits, while the Seattle Mariners recorded 16 hits, as the 40 combined hits broke the Comerica Park record for most hits in a nine-inning game. The Tigers were two runs shy of its franchise record, and four hits shy of its most hits in a game.
- On May 20, the Tigers hit three consecutive home runs in an inning for the first time since 2013.
- On September 8, the Tigers turned their first triple play since 2001.

=== Individual accomplishments ===
==== Hitting ====
- On April 4, JaCoby Jones became the first Tigers rookie to hit a home run on Opening Day since Kirk Gibson in 1980, and the first Tiger to record his first Major League home run on Opening Day since John Sullivan in 1965.
- On April 11, James McCann hit his third home run of the season, becoming the first Tigers catcher in franchise history to hit three home runs in the first seven games of the season.
- On April 19, Nicholas Castellanos hit two triples in the game, becoming the first Tigers player to do so since Austin Jackson in 2012.
- On May 18, J. D. Martinez became the first Major League player since 1999 to record eight or more hits and eight or more walks in his first 24 plate appearances in a season.
- On June 2, Miguel Cabrera recorded his 1,000th career extra-base hit, becoming the 39th player in Major League history to reach the milestone.
- On July 7, Víctor Martínez recorded his 2,000th career hit, becoming the ninth active player to reach the milestone.
- On July 18, Nicholas Castellanos hit a single, triple and two home runs in the game, becoming the fourth Tigers player to do since 1913, and the first Tigers player to do so since Dmitri Young in 2003.
- On July 20, Miguel Cabrera recorded his 1,600th career RBI, becoming the 36th player in Major League history to reach the milestone.
- On August 6, Nicholas Castellanos recorded his 500th career hit.
- On September 29, Nicholas Castellanos recorded his 100th RBI of the season. He became the sixth player in Tigers history to record 10 or more triples, 25 or more home runs and 100 or more RBIs in a season, and the first player to do so since Al Kaline in 1956.

==== Pitching ====
- On April 4, Justin Verlander tied a franchise record for the most strikeouts on Opening Day with 10, becoming the first Tigers player to do so since Mickey Lolich in 1970.
- On June 21 against the Seattle Mariners, Justin Verlander retired the first 16 batters he faced, before a bunt hit by Jarrod Dyson in the sixth inning ruined the perfect game bid.
- On July 17 against the Kansas City Royals, Jordan Zimmermann threw 79 strikes out of 97 pitches, an 81 percent strike rate that ranks as the best by a Tigers starter with 80 pitches or more since at least 1988, and was the best by a Major League starter since 2008.
- On August 9 against the Pittsburgh Pirates, Justin Verlander took a no-hitter into the sixth inning, before a two-out double by Josh Bell ruined the no-hit bid.
- On September 17 against the Chicago White Sox, Matthew Boyd took a no-hitter into the ninth inning, before a two-out double by Tim Anderson ruined the no-hit bid.

==== Defensive ====
- On September 8, the team converted its first triple play since the 2001 season. The play was converted by Jeimer Candelario at third base, Ian Kinsler at second base, and Efren Navarro at first base off a ball hit by Kevin Pillar of the Toronto Blue Jays.
- On September 30, Andrew Romine became the fifth player in Major League history to play all nine positions in a single game, and the first player to do so since Shane Halter in 2000.

=== All-Stars ===
The Tigers sent two players to the 2017 Major League Baseball All-Star Game. Starting pitcher Michael Fulmer was named to the All-Star Game, but did not participate due to pitching on Sunday, so his teammate outfielder Justin Upton took his place on the American League roster.

== Game log ==
2017 Game Log: 64–98 (Home: 34–47; Away: 30–51)
April: 12–12 (Home: 7–6; Away: 5–6)

#	Date	Opponent	Score	Win	Loss	Save	Attendance	Record	Streak
—	April 3	@ White Sox	Postponed (inclement weather). Rescheduled to April 4.						
1	April 4	@ White Sox	6–3	**Verlander** (1–0)	Quintana (0–1)	**Rodríguez** (1)	36,534	1–0	W1
—	April 5	@ White Sox	Postponed (inclement weather). Rescheduled to May 26.						
2	April 6	@ White Sox	2–11	Shields (1–0)	**Boyd** (0–1)	—	10,842	1–1	L1
3	April 7	Red Sox	6–5	**Rodríguez** (1–0)	Hembree (0–1)	—	45,013	2–1	W1
4	April 8	Red Sox	4–1	**Zimmermann** (1–0)	Rodríguez (0–1)	**J. Wilson** (1)	32,622	3–1	W2
5	April 9	Red Sox	5–7	Barnes (1–0)	**Rondón** (0–1)	Kimbrel (2)	33,662	3–2	L1
6	April 10	Red Sox	2–1	**J. Wilson** (1–0)	Sale (0–1)	**Rodríguez** (2)	24,672	4–2	W1
7	April 11	Twins	2–1	**Boyd** (1–1)	Santiago (1–1)	**Rodríguez** (3)	21,237	5–2	W2
8	April 12	Twins	5–3	**Fulmer** (1–0)	Gibson (0–1)	**A. Wilson** (1)	23,738	6–2	W3
9	April 13	Twins	5–11	Hughes (2–0)	**Zimmermann** (1–1)	Haley (1)	22,573	6–3	L1
10	April 14	@ Indians	7–6	**Norris** (1–0)	Bauer (0–2)	**Rodríguez** (4)	25,423	7–3	W1
11	April 15	@ Indians	6–13	Kluber (1–1)	**Verlander** (1–1)	—	26,691	7–4	L1
12	April 16	@ Indians	4–1	**Boyd** (2–1)	Carrasco (1–1)	**Rodríguez** (5)	17,739	8–4	W1
13	April 18	@ Rays	1–5	Andriese (1–0)	**Fulmer** (1–1)	—	16,265	8–5	L1
14	April 19	@ Rays	7–8	Pruitt (1–0)	**Rodríguez** (1–1)	—	12,281	8–6	L2
15	April 20	@ Rays	1–8	Ramírez (2–0)	**Norris** (1–1)	—	13,267	8–7	L3
16	April 21	@ Twins	3–6	Santiago (2–1)	**Verlander** (1–2)	Kintzler (4)	22,647	8–8	L4
17	April 22	@ Twins	5–4	**Hardy** (1–0)	Tonkin (0–1)	**Rodríguez** (6)	25,719	9–8	W1
18	April 23	@ Twins	13–4	**Fulmer** (2–1)	Gibson (0–3)	—	26,713	10–8	W2
19	April 25	Mariners	19–9	**Zimmermann** (2–1)	Hernández (2–2)	—	22,728	11–8	W3
20	April 26	Mariners	0–8	Paxton (3–0)	**Norris** (1–2)	—	23,327	11–9	L1
21	April 27	Mariners	1–2	Zych (1–0)	**Rodríguez** (1–2)	Díaz (3)	25,325	11–10	L2
22	April 28	White Sox	3–7	Swarzak (2–0)	**A. Wilson** (0–1)	—	26,049	11–11	L3
23	April 29	White Sox	4–6 (10)	Robertson (1–0)	**J. Wilson** (1–1)	—	36,217	11–12	L4
24	April 30	White Sox	7–3	**Zimmermann** (3–1)	González (3–1)	—	26,045	12–12	W1

May: 13–16 (Home: 5–4; Away: 8–12)

#	Date	Opponent	Score	Win	Loss	Save	Attendance	Record	Streak
25	May 1	Indians	7–1	**Norris** (2–2)	Bauer (2–3)	—	22,045	13–12	W2
26	May 2	Indians	5–2	**Verlander** (2–2)	Kluber (3–2)	**Rodríguez** (7)	21,799	14–12	W3
27	May 3	Indians	2–3	Carrasco (3–2)	**Boyd** (2–2)	Allen (7)	22,663	14–13	L1
—	May 4	Indians	Postponed (inclement weather). Rescheduled to July 1.						
28	May 5	@ Athletics	7–2	**Fulmer** (3–1)	Triggs (4–2)	—	17,519	15–13	W1
29	May 6	@ Athletics	5–6	Montas (1–0)	**Rodríguez** (1–3)	—	16,651	15–14	L1
30	May 7	@ Athletics	6–8	Casilla (1–1)	**Rodríguez** (1–4)	—	23,227	15–15	L2
31	May 9	@ Diamondbacks	7–3	**Verlander** (3–2)	Ray (2–3)	—	20,445	16–15	W1
32	May 10	@ Diamondbacks	1–7	Godley (1–0)	**Boyd** (2–3)	—	18,897	16–16	L1
33	May 11	@ Angels	7–1	**Fulmer** (4–1)	Ramírez (3–3)	—	30,207	17–16	W1
34	May 12	@ Angels	0–7	Shoemaker (2–2)	**Zimmermann** (3–2)	—	44,311	17–17	L1
35	May 13	@ Angels	4–3	**A. Wilson** (1–1)	Norris (2–1)	**J. Wilson** (2)	40,251	18–17	W1
36	May 14	@ Angels	1–4	Meyer (2–1)	**Verlander** (3–3)	Norris (7)	36,215	18–18	L1
37	May 16	Orioles	11–13 (13)	Bleier (1–1)	**Rodríguez** (1–5)	—	25,109	18–19	L2
38	May 17	Orioles	5–4	**Fulmer** (5–1)	Jiménez (1–2)	**J. Wilson** (3)	29,722	19–19	W1
39	May 18	Orioles	6–5	**Zimmermann** (4–2)	Bundy (5–2)	**A. Wilson** (2)	32,455	20–19	W2
40	May 19	Rangers	3–5	Martinez (1–2)	**Norris** (2–3)	Bush (5)	33,122	20–20	L1
41	May 20	Rangers	9–3	**Verlander** (4–3)	Griffin (4–1)	—	35,166	21–20	W1
42	May 21	Rangers	2–5	Darvish (5–2)	**Boyd** (2–4)	Kela (1)	24,080	21–21	L1
43	May 22	@ Astros	0–1	Devenski (3–2)	**Fulmer** (5–2)	Giles (12)	22,146	21–22	L2
44	May 23	@ Astros	2–6	McCullers (5–1)	**Zimmermann** (4–3)	—	23,179	21–23	L3
45	May 24	@ Astros	6–3	**Greene** (1–0)	Devenski (3–3)	—	26,481	22–23	W1
46	May 25	@ Astros	6–7	Gregerson (2–1)	**A. Wilson** (1–2)	Giles (13)	25,046	22–24	L1
—	May 26	@ White Sox	Postponed (rain). Rescheduled to May 27.						
47	May 26	@ White Sox	2–8	Pelfrey (2–4)	**Boyd** (2–5)	—	17,842	22–25	L2
48	May 27	@ White Sox	0–3	Danish (1–0)	**Fulmer** (5–3)	Robertson (6)	26,327	22–26	L3
49	May 27	@ White Sox	4–3	**Farmer** (1–0)	Holland (4–4)	—	26,327	23–26	W1
50	May 28	@ White Sox	3–7	González (4–5)	**Zimmermann** (4–4)	Robertson (7)	27,578	23–27	L1
51	May 29	@ Royals	10–7	**Rodríguez** (2–5)	Soria (2–2)	**J. Wilson** (4)	28,419	24–27	W1
52	May 30	@ Royals	0–1	Skoglund (1–0)	**Verlander** (4–4)	Herrera (12)	21,864	24–28	L1
53	May 31	@ Royals	6–5	**Saupold** (1–0)	Kennedy (0–5)	**J. Wilson** (5)	24,347	25–28	W1

June: 10–15 (Home: 8–7; Away: 2–8)

#	Date	Opponent	Score	Win	Loss	Save	Attendance	Record	Streak
54	June 2	White Sox	15–5	**Fulmer** (6–3)	Holland (4–5)	—	28,619	26–28	W2
55	June 3	White Sox	10–1	**Zimmermann** (5–4)	González (4–6)	—	33,188	27–28	W3
56	June 4	White Sox	7–4	**J. Wilson** (2–1)	Robertson (3–2)	—	30,208	28–28	W4
57	June 6	Angels	3–5	Chavez (5–6)	**D. Norris** (2–4)	B. Norris (11)	24,175	28–29	L1
58	June 7	Angels	4–0	**Farmer** (2–0)	Meyer (2–3)	—	24,958	29–29	W1
59	June 8	Angels	4–11	Ramírez (6–4)	**Fulmer** (6–4)	—	34,810	29–30	L1
60	June 9	@ Red Sox	3–5	Barnes (4–2)	**A. Wilson** (1–3)	Kimbrel (18)	36,853	29–31	L2
61	June 10	@ Red Sox	3–11	Sale (8–2)	**Saupold** (1–1)	—	37,162	29–32	L3
62	June 11	@ Red Sox	8–3	**Norris** (3–4)	Pomeranz (6–4)	—	35,457	30–32	W1
63	June 13	Diamondbacks	6–7	Bradley (2–1)	**J. Wilson** (2–2)	Rodney (17)	25,119	30–33	L1
64	June 14	Diamondbacks	1–2	Walker (5–3)	**Zimmermann** (5–5)	Rodney (18)	26,134	30–34	L2
65	June 15	Rays	5–3	**J. Wilson** (3–2)	Hunter (0–2)	—	24,056	31–34	W1
66	June 16	Rays	13–4	**Norris** (4–4)	Ramírez (3–2)	—	29,674	32–34	W2
67	June 17	Rays	2–3	Archer (5–4)	**Fulmer** (6–5)	Colomé (19)	33,478	32–35	L1
68	June 18	Rays	1–9	Faria (3–0)	**Farmer** (2–1)	—	36,442	32–36	L2
69	June 19	@ Mariners	2–6	Pazos (2–1)	**A. Wilson** (1–4)	—	21,517	32–37	L3
70	June 20	@ Mariners	4–5 (10)	Cishek (1–1)	**J. Wilson** (3–3)	—	15,063	32–38	L4
71	June 21	@ Mariners	5–7	Zych (3–2)	**Greene** (1–1)	Díaz (12)	18,526	32–39	L5
72	June 22	@ Mariners	6–9	Moore (1–0)	**Norris** (4–5)	Cishek (1)	18,736	32–40	L6
73	June 23	@ Padres	0–1	Perdomo (2–4)	**Fulmer** (6–6)	Maurer (14)	25,477	32–41	L7
74	June 24	@ Padres	3–7	Yates (2–1)	**Greene** (1–2)	—	31,749	32–42	L8
75	June 25	@ Padres	7–5	**Rondón** (1–1)	Maurer (0–4)	**J. Wilson** (6)	29,595	33–42	W1
76	June 27	Royals	5–3	**Verlander** (5–4)	Strahm (2–5)	**J. Wilson** (7)	29,488	34–42	W2
77	June 28	Royals	2–8	Kennedy (2–6)	**Norris** (4–6)	—	29,614	34–43	L1
78	June 29	Royals	7–3	**Fulmer** (7–6)	Junis (2–2)	—	33,681	35–43	W1
—	June 30	Indians	Postponed (rain). Rescheduled to September 1.						

July: 12–14 (Home: 7–8; Away: 5–6)

#	Date	Opponent	Score	Win	Loss	Save	Attendance	Record	Streak
79	July 1	Indians	7–4	**Greene** (2–2)	Shaw (2–3)	**J. Wilson** (8)	28,719	36–43	W2
80	July 1	Indians	1–4	Carrasco (9–3)	**Zimmermann** (5–6)	Miller (2)	27,016	36–44	L1
81	July 2	Indians	8–11	Clevinger (4–3)	**Verlander** (5–5)	Allen (16)	30,429	36–45	L2
82	July 4	Giants	5–3	**Fulmer** (8–6)	Cain (3–8)	**J. Wilson** (9)	32,514	37–45	W1
83	July 5	Giants	4–5	Blach (6–5)	**Norris** (4–7)	Dyson (3)	26,631	37–46	L1
84	July 6	Giants	6–2	**Sánchez** (1–0)	Stratton (0–2)	—	27,210	38–46	W1
85	July 7	@ Indians	2–11	Carrasco (10–3)	**Zimmermann** (5–7)	—	32,307	38–47	L1
86	July 8	@ Indians	0–4	Clevinger (5–3)	**Verlander** (5–6)	—	34,726	38–48	L2
87	July 9	@ Indians	5–3	**Fulmer** (9–6)	Goody (1–1)	**J. Wilson** (10)	24,519	39–48	W1
88	July 14	Blue Jays	2–7	Sanchez (1–2)	**Verlander** (5–7)	—	37,879	39–49	L1
89	July 15	Blue Jays	11–1	**Fulmer** (10–6)	Liriano (5–5)	—	40,056	40–49	W1
90	July 16	Blue Jays	6–5 (11)	**Saupold** (2–1)	Beliveau (1–1)	—	37,173	41–49	W2
91	July 17	@ Royals	10–2	**Zimmermann** (6–7)	Vargas (12–4)	—	26,359	42–49	W3
92	July 18	@ Royals	9–3	**Boyd** (3–5)	Wood (1–3)	—	22,908	43–49	W4
93	July 19	@ Royals	3–4	McCarthy (1–0)	**J. Wilson** (3–4)	—	30,105	43–50	L1
94	July 20	@ Royals	4–16	Duffy (6–6)	**Fulmer** (10–7)	—	29,018	43–51	L2
95	July 21	@ Twins	6–3	**Sánchez** (2–0)	Santana (11–7)	**J. Wilson** (11)	22,369	44–51	W1
96	July 22	@ Twins	5–6	Gibson (6–8)	**Zimmermann** (6–8)	Kintzler (27)	33,700	44–52	L1
97	July 23	@ Twins	9–6	**Boyd** (4–5)	Hildenberger (1–1)	**J. Wilson** (12)	28,373	45–52	W1
98	July 24	Royals	3–5 (12)	Junis (3–2)	**VerHagen** (0–1)	Herrera (20)	26,415	45–53	L1
99	July 25	Royals	1–3	Duffy (7–6)	**Fulmer** (10–8)	Herrera (21)	27,259	45–54	L2
100	July 26	Royals	2–16	Kennedy (4–6)	**Sánchez** (2–1)	—	29,073	45–55	L3
101	July 28	Astros	5–6	Peacock (9–1)	**Rondón** (1–2)	Giles (22)	30,358	45–56	L4
102	July 29	Astros	5–3	**Boyd** (5–5)	Martes (3–1)	**J. Wilson** (13)	33,766	46–56	W1
103	July 30	Astros	13–1	**Verlander** (6–7)	McCullers (7–3)	—	31,970	47–56	W2
104	July 31	@ Yankees	3–7	Severino (8–4)	**Fulmer** (10–9)	Chapman (13)	39,904	47–57	L1

August: 11–17 (Home: 4–7; Away: 7–10)

#	Date	Opponent	Score	Win	Loss	Save	Attendance	Record	Streak
105	August 1	@ Yankees	4–3	**Sánchez** (3–1)	Sabathia (9–4)	**Greene** (1)	43,238	48–57	W1
106	August 2	@ Yankees	2–0	**Zimmermann** (7–8)	Tanaka (8–10)	**Greene** (2)	43,379	49–57	W2
107	August 3	@ Orioles	7–5	**Saupold** (3–1)	Tillman (1–7)	**Greene** (3)	17,157	50–57	W3
108	August 4	@ Orioles	5–2	**Verlander** (7–7)	Givens (7–1)	**Rondón** (1)	22,882	51–57	W4
109	August 5	@ Orioles	2–5	Brach (3–2)	**Jiménez** (0–1)	Britton (9)	33,911	51–58	L1
110	August 6	@ Orioles	3–12	Jiménez (5–7)	**Sánchez** (3–2)	—	30,144	51–59	L2
111	August 7	@ Pirates	0–3	Williams (5–4)	**Zimmermann** (7–9)	Nicasio (2)	21,651	51–60	L3
112	August 8	@ Pirates	3–6	Kuhl (5–7)	**Boyd** (5–6)	Rivero (10)	25,112	51–61	L4
113	August 9	Pirates	10–0	**Verlander** (8–7)	Nova (10–9)	—	28,902	52–61	W1
114	August 10	Pirates	5–7	Cole (10–8)	**VerHagen** (0–2)	Rivero (11)	33,490	52–62	L1
115	August 11	Twins	4–9	Pressly (2–2)	**Sánchez** (3–3)	—	29,733	52–63	L2
116	August 12	Twins	12–11	**Greene** (3–2)	Belisle (0–2)	—	33,006	53–63	W1
117	August 13	Twins	4–6	Duffey (2–3)	**Rondón** (1–3)	Hildenberger (1)	30,582	53–64	L1
118	August 14	@ Rangers	2–6	Pérez (7–10)	**Fulmer** (10–10)	—	21,041	53–65	L2
119	August 15	@ Rangers	4–10	Griffin (6–3)	**Verlander** (8–8)	—	20,636	53–66	L3
120	August 16	@ Rangers	6–12	Hamels (8–1)	**Bell** (0–1)	—	22,713	53–67	L4
121	August 18	Dodgers	5–8	Hill (9–4)	**Zimmermann** (7–10)	—	32,801	53–68	L5
122	August 19	Dodgers	0–3	Stripling (3–4)	**Fulmer** (10–11)	Jansen (33)	37,182	53–69	L6
123	August 20	Dodgers	6–1	**Verlander** (9–8)	Maeda (11–5)	—	30,901	54–69	W1
124	August 22	Yankees	4–13	Tanaka (9–10)	**Boyd** (5–7)	—	27,818	54–70	L1
125	August 23	Yankees	2–10	Severino (11–5)	**Zimmermann** (7–11)	—	29,695	54–71	L2
126	August 24	Yankees	10–6	**A. Wilson** (2–4)	Betances (3–5)	**Greene** (4)	32,622	55–71	W1
127	August 25	@ White Sox	2–3	Minaya (2–1)	**Jiménez** (0–2)	—	23,171	55–72	L1
128	August 26	@ White Sox	6–3	**Farmer** (3–1)	Rodon (2–5)	**Greene** (5)	29,489	56–72	W1
129	August 27	@ White Sox	1–7	Giolito (1–1)	**Boyd** (5–8)	—	22,532	56–73	L1
130	August 28	@ Rockies	4–3	**Zimmermann** (8–11)	Senzatela (10–5)	**Greene** (6)	30,754	57–73	W1
131	August 29	@ Rockies	3–7	Neshek (5–3)	**Fulmer** (10–12)	—	30,721	57–74	L1
132	August 30	@ Rockies	6–2	**Verlander** (10–8)	Bettis (0–2)	—	29,281	58–74	W1

September/October: 6–24 (Home: 3–15; Away: 3–9)

#	Date	Opponent	Score	Win	Loss	Save	Attendance	Record	Streak
133	September 1	Indians	2–3	Allen (2–6)	**Greene** (3–3)	Smith (1)	26,093	58–75	L1
134	September 1	Indians	0–10	Clevinger (8–5)	**Farmer** (3–2)	—	24,342	58–76	L2
135	September 2	Indians	2–5	Kluber (14–4)	**Zimmermann** (8–12)	Allen (23)	25,272	58–77	L3
136	September 3	Indians	1–11	Tomlin (8–9)	**Bell** (0–2)	—	25,244	58–78	L4
137	September 4	Royals	6–7	Junis (7–2)	**Lewicki** (0–1)	Alexander (3)	24,804	58–79	L5
138	September 5	Royals	13–2	**Jaye** (1–0)	Vargas (14–10)	—	22,547	59–79	W1
139	September 6	Royals	2–13	Hammel (8–10)	**Boyd** (5–9)	—	23,755	59–80	L1
140	September 8	@ Blue Jays	5–4	**Farmer** (4–2)	Stroman (11–7)	**Greene** (7)	31,961	60–80	W1
141	September 9	@ Blue Jays	4–5	Anderson (3–3)	**Saupold** (3–2)	Tepera (2)	44,218	60–81	L1
142	September 10	@ Blue Jays	2–8	Happ (8–10)	**Sánchez** (3–4)	Santos (1)	39,797	60–82	L2
143	September 11	@ Indians	0–11	Carrasco (15–6)	**Jaye** (1–1)	—	18,521	60–83	L3
144	September 12	@ Indians	0–2	Kluber (16–4)	**Boyd** (5–10)	—	24,654	60–84	L4
145	September 13	@ Indians	3–5	Clevinger (10–5)	**Farmer** (4–3)	Allen (27)	29,346	60–85	L5
146	September 14	White Sox	7–17	Shields (4–6)	**Bell** (0–3)	—	26,743	60–86	L6
147	September 15	White Sox	3–2	**Greene** (4–3)	Alburquerque (0–2)	—	25,298	61–86	W1
148	September 16	White Sox	4–10	López (2–3)	**Jaye** (1–2)	—	29,846	61–87	L1
149	September 17	White Sox	12–0	**Boyd** (6–10)	Covey (0–6)	—	25,663	62–87	W1
150	September 18	Athletics	3–8	Hendriks (4–2)	**Farmer** (4–4)	—	23,895	62–88	L1
151	September 19	Athletics	8–9	Casilla (4–5)	**A. Wilson** (2–5)	Treinen (9)	23,460	62–89	L2
152	September 20	Athletics	2–3	Mengden (2–1)	**Sánchez** (3–5)	Hendriks (1)	26,913	62–90	L3
153	September 21	Twins	1–12	Gee (3–2)	**Zimmermann** (8–13)	—	25,437	62–91	L4
154	September 22	Twins	3–7	Gibson (12–10)	**Norris** (4–8)	—	25,390	62–92	L5
155	September 23	Twins	4–10	Santana (16–8)	**Stumpf** (0–1)	—	26,800	62–93	L6
156	September 24	Twins	4–10	Berríos (13–8)	**Farmer** (4–5)	—	23,882	62–94	L7
157	September 26	@ Royals	1–2	Vargas (18–10)	**Sánchez** (3–6)	Minor (3)	20,613	62–95	L8
158	September 27	@ Royals	4–7	Alexander (5–4)	**VerHagen** (0–3)	Minor (4)	21,319	62–96	L9
159	September 28	@ Royals	4–1	**Norris** (5–8)	Duffy (9–10)	**Greene** (8)	21,650	63–96	W1
160	September 29	@ Twins	3–6	Berríos (14–8)	**Boyd** (6–11)	Belisle (9)	34,580	63–97	L1
161	September 30	@ Twins	3–2	**Farmer** (5–5)	Slegers (0–1)	**Greene** (9)	35,515	64–97	W1
162	October 1	@ Twins	1–5	Colón (5–6)	**Sánchez** (3–7)	Moya (1)	28,148	64–98	L1

Legend: = Win = Loss = Postponement
Bold = Tigers team member

== Roster ==
2017 Detroit Tigers
Roster
Pitchers: 58 Victor Alcántara; 64 Chad Bell; 48 Matthew Boyd; 63 William Cuevas; 45 Buck Farmer; 66 Jeff Ferrell; 32 Michael Fulmer; 61 Shane Greene; 65 Blaine Hardy; 65 Myles Jaye; 77 Joe Jiménez; 63 Jairo Labourt; 66 Arcenio León; 57 Artie Lewicki; 39 Edward Mujica; 44 Daniel Norris; 26 Zac Reininger; 57 Francisco Rodríguez; 43 Bruce Rondón; 56 Kyle Ryan; 19 Aníbal Sánchez; 53 Warwick Saupold; 68 Daniel Stumpf; 54 Drew VerHagen; 35 Justin Verlander; 30 Alex Wilson; 38 Justin Wilson; 27 Jordan Zimmermann	Catchers: 31 Alex Avila; 50 Bryan Holaday; 34 James McCann; Infielders: 24 Miguel Cabrera; 46 Jeimer Candelario; 9 Nicholas Castellanos; 55 John Hicks; 1 José Iglesias; 3 Ian Kinsler; 49 Dixon Machado; 41 Víctor Martínez; 74 Efren Navarro; 17 Andrew Romine; Outfielders: 37 Jim Adduci; 18 Tyler Collins; 21 Matt den Dekker; 40 JaCoby Jones; 15 Mikie Mahtook; 28 J. D. Martinez; 14 Alex Presley; 8 Justin Upton	Manager: 7 Brad Ausmus; Coaches: 29 Mick Billmeyer (bullpen/catching); 25 Dave Clark (third base/outfield); 52 Rich Dubee (pitching); 59 Leon Durham (assistant hitting); 22 Gene Lamont (bench); 88 Matt Martin (defense coordinator); 20 Lloyd McClendon (hitting); 98 John Murrian (bullpen catcher); 99 Sam Palace (bullpen catcher); 13 Omar Vizquel (first base/infield/baserunning)

=== Player stats ===
==== Batting ====
Note: G = Games played; AB = At bats; R = Runs scored; H = Hits; 2B = Doubles; 3B = Triples; HR = Home runs; RBI = Runs batted in; AVG = Batting average; SB = Stolen bases

Player	G	AB	R	H	2B	3B	HR	RBI	AVG	SB
Jim Adduci	29	83	14	20	6	2	1	10	.241	1
Alex Avila+	77	219	30	60	11	0	11	32	.274	0
Miguel Cabrera	130	469	50	117	22	0	16	60	.249	0
Jeimer Candelario+	27	94	16	31	7	0	2	13	.330	0
Nicholas Castellanos	157	614	73	167	36	10	26	101	.272	4
Tyler Collins	49	150	18	29	4	1	5	14	.193	0
Matt den Dekker	4	7	1	1	0	0	0	0	.143	0
John Hicks	60	173	25	46	10	0	6	22	.266	2
Bryan Holaday	13	29	1	7	2	0	0	2	.241	0
José Iglesias	130	463	56	118	33	1	6	54	.255	7
JaCoby Jones	56	141	14	24	3	1	3	13	.170	6
Ian Kinsler	139	551	90	130	25	3	22	52	.236	14
Dixon Machado	73	166	17	43	5	1	1	11	.259	1
Mikie Mahtook	109	348	50	96	15	6	12	38	.276	6
J. D. Martinez+	57	200	38	61	13	2	16	39	.305	2
Víctor Martínez	107	392	38	100	16	0	10	47	.255	0
James McCann	106	352	39	89	14	2	13	49	.253	1
Efren Navarro	23	61	9	14	1	1	2	2	.230	0
Alex Presley	71	245	30	77	10	3	3	20	.314	5
Andrew Romine	124	318	45	74	17	2	4	25	.233	6
Justin Upton+	125	459	81	128	37	0	28	94	.279	10
Pitcher totals	162	22	0	3	0	0	0	1	.136	0
Team totals	162	5556	735	1435	289	35	187	699	.258	65

+Totals with Tigers only.

==== Starters and other pitchers ====
Note: W = Wins; L = Losses; ERA = Earned run average; G = Games pitched; GS = Games started; SV = Saves; IP = Innings pitched; R = Runs allowed; ER = Earned runs allowed; BB = Walks allowed; K = Strikeouts

Player	W	L	ERA	G	GS	SV	IP	R	ER	BB	K
Chad Bell	0	3	6.93	28	4	0	62 1/3	49	48	31	57
Matthew Boyd	6	11	5.27	26	25	0	135	84	79	53	110
Buck Farmer	5	5	6.75	11	11	0	48	38	36	20	49
Michael Fulmer	10	12	3.83	25	25	0	164 2/3	80	70	40	114
Myles Jaye	1	2	12.08	5	2	0	12 2/3	18	17	10	4
Artie Lewicki	0	1	6.10	4	1	0	10 1/3	8	7	4	6
Daniel Norris	5	8	5.31	22	18	0	101 2/3	64	60	44	86
Aníbal Sánchez	3	7	6.41	28	17	0	105 1/3	81	75	29	104
Justin Verlander+	10	8	3.82	28	28	0	172	76	73	67	176
Jordan Zimmermann	8	13	6.08	29	29	0	160	111	108	44	103

+Totals with Tigers only.

==== Bullpen ====
Note: W = Wins; L = Losses; ERA = Earned run average; G = Games pitched; GS = Games started; SV = Saves; IP = Innings pitched; R = Runs allowed; ER = Earned runs allowed; BB = Walks allowed; K = Strikeouts

Player	W	L	ERA	G	GS	SV	IP	R	ER	BB	K
Victor Alcántara	0	0	8.59	6	0	0	7 1/3	7	7	4	5
William Cuevas	0	0	108.00	1	0	0	1/3	4	4	0	1
Jeff Ferrell	0	0	6.75	11	0	0	9 1/3	7	7	5	6
Shane Greene	4	3	2.66	71	0	9	67 2/3	21	20	34	73
Blaine Hardy	1	0	5.94	35	0	0	33 1/3	24	22	13	28
Joe Jiménez	0	2	12.32	24	0	0	19	28	26	9	17
Jairo Labourt	0	0	4.50	6	0	0	6	3	3	7	4
Arcenio León	0	0	12.15	6	0	0	6 2/3	9	9	6	2
Edward Mujica	0	0	9.95	5	0	0	6 1/3	7	7	0	7
Zac Reininger	0	0	7.45	10	0	0	9 2/3	8	8	3	5
Francisco Rodríguez	2	5	7.82	28	0	7	25 1/3	23	22	11	23
Andrew Romine	0	0	0.00	2	0	0	1	0	0	1	0
Bruce Rondón	1	3	10.91	21	0	1	15 2/3	19	19	10	22
Kyle Ryan	0	0	7.94	8	0	0	5 2/3	5	5	7	1
Warwick Saupold	3	2	4.88	45	0	0	62 2/3	36	34	31	44
Daniel Stumpf	0	1	3.82	55	0	0	37 2/3	16	16	15	33
Drew VerHagen	0	3	5.77	24	2	0	34 1/3	22	22	9	25
Alex Wilson	2	5	4.50	66	0	2	66	34	30	15	42
Justin Wilson+	3	4	2.68	42	0	13	40 1/3	12	12	16	55
Team Pitching Totals	64	98	5.36	162	162	32	1420 1/3	894	846	538	1202

+Totals with Tigers only.

== Farm system ==
Level	Team	League	Manager
AAA	Toledo Mud Hens	International League	Mike Rojas
AA	Erie SeaWolves	Eastern League	Lance Parrish
A-Advanced	Lakeland Flying Tigers	Florida State League	Andrew Graham
A	West Michigan Whitecaps	Midwest League	Mike Rabelo
A-Short Season	Connecticut Tigers	New York–Penn League	Gerald Laird
Rookie	GCL Tigers East	Gulf Coast League	Jesus Garces
Rookie	GCL Tigers West	Gulf Coast League	Rafael Gil
