= Mikie Mahtook =

American baseball player (born 1989)

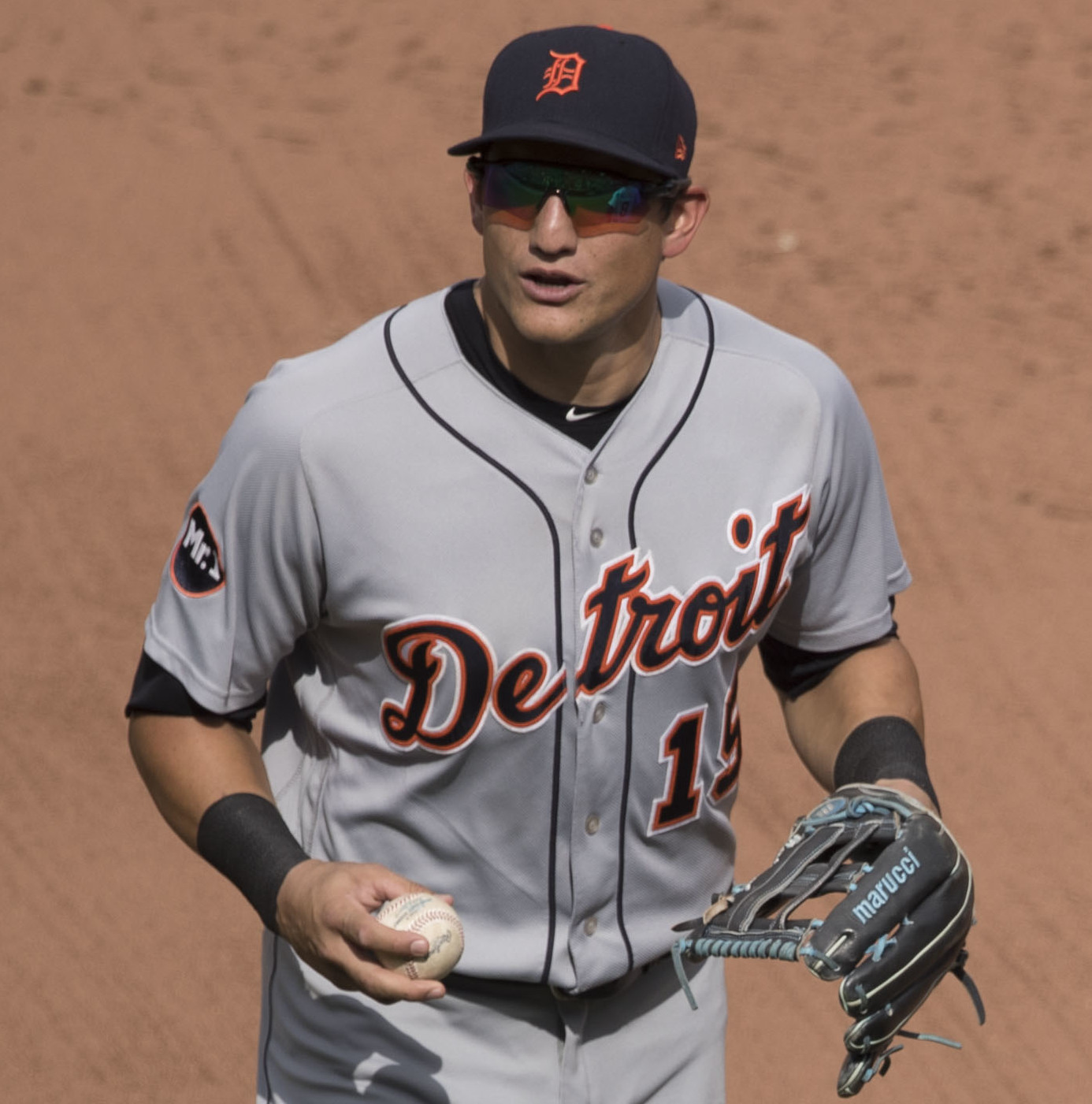
- Mahtook with Detroit in 2017
- Outfielder
- Born: November 30, 1989 (age 36); Lafayette, Louisiana, U.S.
- Batted: Right Threw: Right

MLB debut
- April 10, 2015, for the Tampa Bay Rays

Last MLB appearance
- April 10, 2019, for the Detroit Tigers

MLB statistics
- Batting average: .235
- Home runs: 33
- Runs batted in: 97
- Stats at Baseball Reference

Teams
- Tampa Bay Rays (2015–2016); Detroit Tigers (2017–2019)

Michael Anthony Mahtook (/ˈmɑːtʊk/; born November 30, 1989) is an American former professional baseball outfielder. He played in Major League Baseball (MLB) for the Tampa Bay Rays and Detroit Tigers. Prior to beginning his professional career, Mahtook played college baseball at Louisiana State University.

== Early life and education ==
Mahtook attended St. Thomas More High School in Lafayette, Louisiana and is of Lebanese descent. He played baseball and football in high school. Mahtook enrolled at Louisiana State University (LSU), where he played college baseball for the LSU Tigers baseball team in the Southeastern Conference (SEC).

He was drafted by the Florida Marlins in the 39th round of the 2008 MLB draft, but did not sign to attend LSU. In 2009, Mahtook was a part of the 2009 College World Series championship team. As a junior at LSU, Mahtook led the SEC in batting in league play with a .425 average. He also led the league in on-base percentage (OBP) in league play with .538. He hit 14 home runs, drove in 56 runs and stole 29 bases. He was named a first team All-American by Baseball America. In 2010, he played collegiate summer baseball with the Harwich Mariners of the Cape Cod Baseball League.

== Career ==
=== Tampa Bay Rays ===
The Tampa Bay Rays selected Mahtook in the first round, with the 31st overall selection, of the 2011 MLB draft with a compensation pick from the New York Yankees gained when the Yankees signed Rafael Soriano. Before the 2012 season, MLB.com rated Mahtook as the 96th best prospect in baseball. He began the 2012 season with the Charlotte Stone Crabs of the High–A Florida State League and was promoted to the Montgomery Biscuits of the Double–A Southern League. He spent the 2013 season with the Montgomery Biscuits.

Mahtook began the 2015 season with the Durham Bulls of the Triple–A International League. On April 10, the Rays promoted Mahtook to the major leagues to replace the injured John Jaso on the roster. He made his major league debut the same day, in a pinch hit at bat. He was recalled to Tampa Bay again from the Durham Bulls on June 2. At the major league level, Mahtook hit .295 for the 2015 season, with 9 home runs in only 105 at-bats.

Due to injuries, Mahtook played just 96 games in 2016, including 65 with the Rays. He took a step backward at the major league level, hitting .195 with 3 home runs in 185 at-bats.

=== Detroit Tigers ===
On January 18, 2017, the Rays traded Mahtook to the Detroit Tigers for a player to be named later or cash considerations. On April 28, the Tigers sent minor league pitcher Drew Smith to the Rays to complete the trade for Mahtook. Mahtook appeared in 109 games for the 2017 Tigers, hitting .276 with 12 home runs.

Mahtook opened the 2018 season as the Tigers' starting left fielder. After batting 4-for-31 (.129) in 11 games, the Tigers optioned him to the Triple–A Toledo Mud Hens of the International League. He was recalled on May 8, following an injury to center fielder Leonys Martín. He was recalled on July 2, again to replace an injured Martín, and again on August 13 to replace an injured JaCoby Jones. Mahtook finished the 2018 season hitting .202 with 9 home runs in 223 at-bats.

After a strong showing at spring training, Mahtook made the Tigers' Opening Day roster in 2019. After starting the season 0-for-23 with 11 strikeouts, he was designated for assignment on April 11. He was outrighted to Toledo after clearing waivers two days later. He became a minor league free agent on November 4.

=== Philadelphia Phillies ===
On December 18, 2019, Mahtook signed a minor league contract with the Philadelphia Phillies that included an invitation to spring training. He did not play in a game in 2020 due to the cancellation of the minor league season because of the COVID-19 pandemic. Mahtook became a free agent on November 2, 2020.

=== Chicago White Sox ===
On February 26, 2021, Mahtook signed a minor league contract with the Chicago White Sox organization. On November 7, 2021, Mahtook became a free agent.

== Personal life ==
Mahtook's father, Michael Mahtook, played college football at LSU. He died of a heart attack at the age of 32, when Mikie was four years old. Mahtook's mother, Mary Ann, had breast cancer during his first year at LSU. He has younger twin sisters, Catherine and Christina. In 2020, Mahtook tested positive for COVID-19 during intake testing during the start of summer training.
