= Jim Adduci (baseball, born 1985) =

Canadian-American baseball player

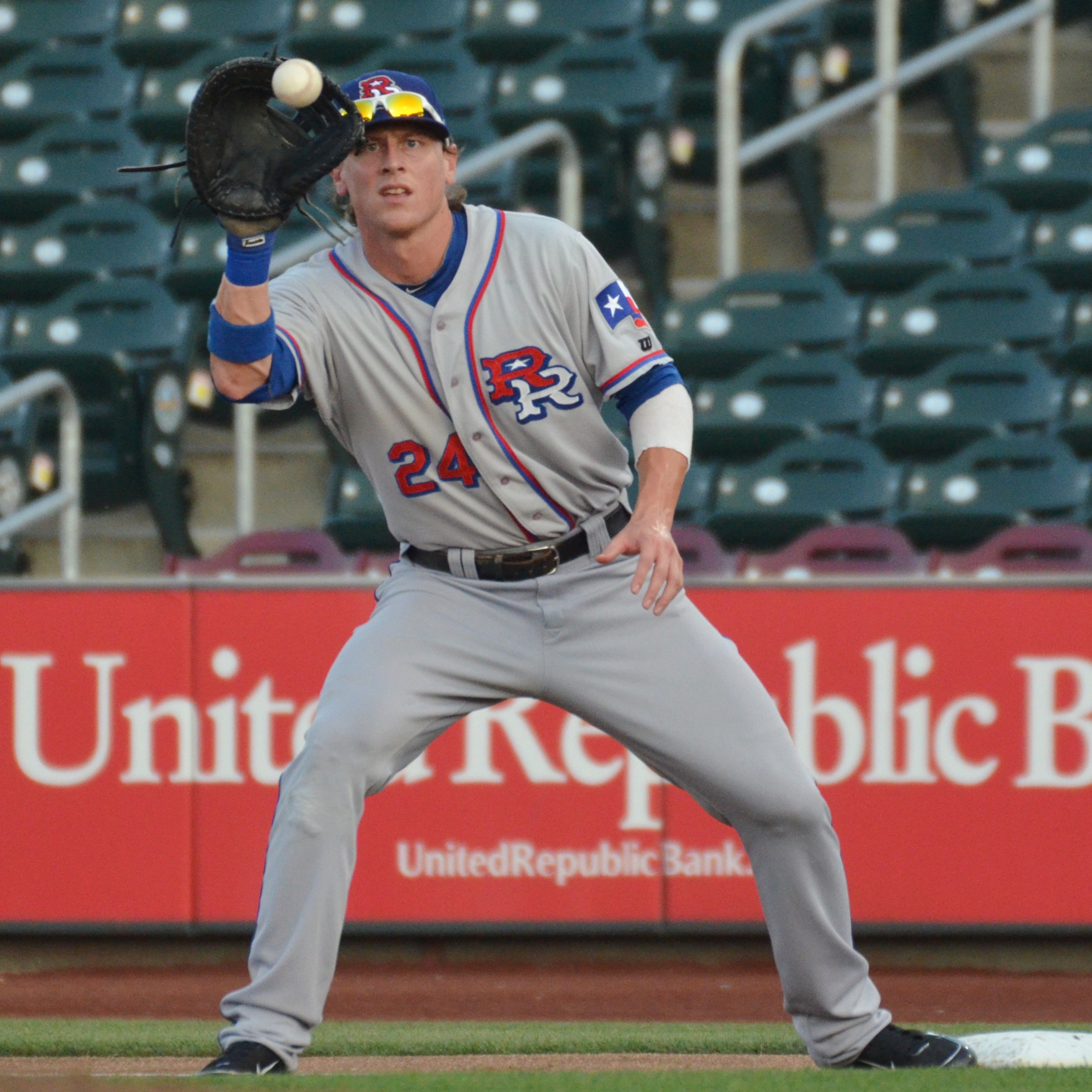
- Adduci playing for the Round Rock Express, triple-A affiliates of the Texas Rangers, in 2013
- Outfielder / First baseman / Coach
- Born: May 15, 1985 (age 41); Burnaby, British Columbia, Canada
- Batted: Left Threw: Left

Professional debut
- MLB: September 1, 2013, for the Texas Rangers
- KBO: March 28, 2015, for the Lotte Giants

Last appearance
- KBO: June 23, 2016, for the Lotte Giants
- MLB: June 1, 2019, for the Chicago Cubs

MLB statistics
- Batting average: .235
- Home runs: 5
- Runs batted in: 39

KBO statistics
- Batting average: .307
- Home runs: 35
- Runs batted in: 147
- Stats at Baseball Reference

Teams
- As player: Texas Rangers (2013–2014); Lotte Giants (2015–2016); Detroit Tigers (2017–2018); Chicago Cubs (2019); As coach: Chicago Cubs (2023–2024)

James Charles Adduci (born May 15, 1985) is a Canadian–born American former professional baseball outfielder and first baseman. He played in Major League Baseball (MLB) for the Texas Rangers, Detroit Tigers, and Chicago Cubs, and in the KBO League for the Lotte Giants. He has also served as a coach for the Cubs.

== Early life ==
Adduci was the only son born to Major League Baseball player Jim Adduci in British Columbia when the latter was playing in the Milwaukee Brewers farm system for the Vancouver Canadians. Adduci spent the first two months of his life in Canada and, as of 2013, had never been back. However, he holds dual American and Canadian citizenship.

Adduci grew up in Evergreen Park, Illinois. He attended Evergreen Park Community High School, where he was a two sport star in baseball and basketball. Adduci batted over .500 his junior season and .550 his senior season. He earned team MVP, all conference, and all area in his junior and senior seasons. Adduci was named an all state honourable mention by both the Chicago Sun-Times and Chicago Tribune following his senior season.

Adduci committed to play college baseball for Northern Illinois during his senior year of high school.

== Professional career ==
=== Florida Marlins ===
The Florida Marlins drafted Adduci in the 42nd round of the 2003 Major League Baseball draft. He made his professional debut in 2004 with the Rookie–level Gulf Coast Marlins, batting .207 in 49 games. Adduci remained with the Gulf Coast team during the 2005 season, batting .378 in only 11 games.

Adduci again saw limited action during the 2006 season, appearing in 12 games for the Gulf Coast Marlins and only two games for the Single–A Greensboro Grasshoppers. In September, he was acquired by the Chicago Cubs.

=== Chicago Cubs ===
Now in Chicago's minor league system, Adduci split the 2007 season between the Peoria Chiefs and the Daytona Cubs. He spent the majority of the season with Peoria, batting .292 over 107 games, and tallying two home runs, 48 runs batted in, and 20 stolen bases. In 12 games with Daytona, Adduci batted .121. He spent the 2008 season in the Florida State League with Daytona, appearing in 123 games. He posted a .290 batting average, hit three home runs, drove in 48 runs, and stole 26 bases.

Adduci was promoted to the Class AA Tennessee Smokies for the 2009 season. He batted .300 over 131 games, with four home runs, 51 RBI, and 35 steals. He also appeared in 20 games for Naranjeros de Hermosillo of the Mexican Pacific Winter League, where he hit for a .224 average.

=== Texas Rangers ===
On November 12, 2012, Adduci signed a minor league deal with the Texas Rangers. He spent the 2013 season with the Triple-A Round Rock Express, and made his major league debut on September 1, 2013. On November 20, 2014, Adduci was designated for assignment by the Rangers. On November 24, he was released.

=== Lotte Giants ===
On November 25, 2014, Adduci signed with the Lotte Giants of the KBO League for $650,000. He played in 132 games for Lotte in 2015, batting an excellent .314/.385/.557 with 28 home runs, 106 RBI, and 24 stolen bases.

In 2016, Adduci played in 64 games for the Giants, hitting .292/.336/.474 with 7 home runs, 41 RBI, and 15 stolen bases. On July 1, 2016, the Giants put Adduci on waivers after he tested positive for a banned substance, the pain medication oxycodone. Adduci was banned for 36 games, resulting in him leaving the KBO League. The Giants were later fined 10 million won (US$8,730) for inadequate player management as a result.

=== Detroit Tigers ===
On January 10, 2017, Adduci signed a minor-league contract with the Detroit Tigers. On April 23, the Tigers recalled him from the Triple–A Toledo Mud Hens to replace the injured JaCoby Jones. Adduci was placed on the 10–day disabled list on May 12. Following a rehab assignment in Toledo and the trade of Tiger outfielder J. D. Martinez on July 18, Adduci was recalled to the Tigers and joined them for a July 19 game against the Kansas City Royals. He elected free agency on November 6, and signed a new minor league contract with the Tigers on December 5.

After starting the 2018 season in Triple–A Toledo, Adduci was called up to the Tigers on July 2. With both Miguel Cabrera and John Hicks having been placed on the disabled list during the year, Adduci played the majority of his games as the Tigers' first baseman. He finished the 2018 season hitting .267 with 3 home runs and 21 RBI in 176 at-bats. On October 24, Adduci was removed from the 40-man roster and sent outright to Triple-A Toledo. He subsequently rejected the assignment and elected free agency.

=== Chicago Cubs (second stint) ===
On December 18, 2018, Adduci signed a minor league deal with the Chicago Cubs. His contract was selected by the Cubs on May 27, 2019, and he was added to the 40 man MLB roster. On June 3, 2019, the Cubs designated Adduci for assignment in order to open up a roster spot for former Cleveland outfielder Carlos González. He elected free agency on October 1.

=== Texas Rangers (second stint) ===
On March 14, 2020, Adduci signed a minor league contract with the Texas Rangers organization. Adduci did not play in a game in 2020 due to the cancellation of the minor league season because of the COVID-19 pandemic. He became a free agent on November 2.

== Coaching career ==
=== Chicago Cubs ===
On December 10, 2020, Adduci was hired as the run production coordinator for the Chicago Cubs. On October 1, 2024, it was announced that the Cubs were parting ways with Adduci.

=== Arizona Diamondbacks ===
On January 15, 2025, the Arizona Diamondbacks hired Adduci to serve as the assistant hitting coach for their High-A affiliate, the Hillsboro Hops. He assumed the role of the team's primary hitting coach entering the 2026 season.
