= Myles Jaye =

American baseball player (born 1991)

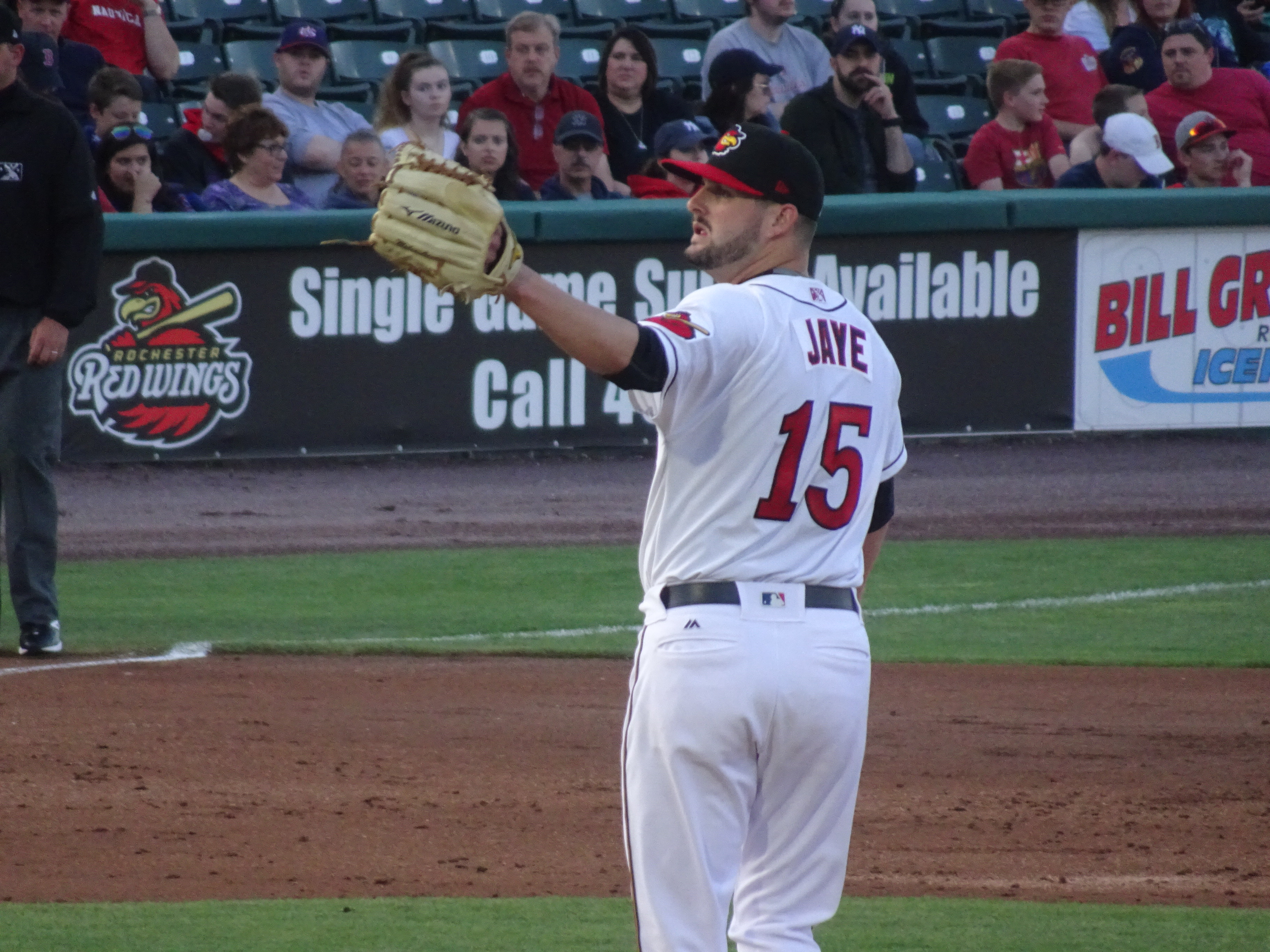
- Jaye with Rochester Red Wings in 2018
- Pitcher
- Born: December 28, 1991 (age 34); Fayetteville, Georgia, U.S.
- Batted: Switch Threw: Right

MLB debut
- September 2, 2017, for the Detroit Tigers

Last MLB appearance
- September 21, 2017, for the Detroit Tigers

MLB statistics
- Win–loss record: 1–2
- Earned run average: 12.08
- Strikeouts: 4
- Stats at Baseball Reference

Teams
- Detroit Tigers (2017)

Myles Joseph Jaye (born December 28, 1991) is an American former professional baseball pitcher who played in Major League Baseball (MLB) for the Detroit Tigers in 2017.

== Career ==
=== Toronto Blue Jays ===
Jaye attended Starr's Mill High School in Fayetteville, Georgia, and was drafted by the Toronto Blue Jays in the 17th round of the 2010 Major League Baseball draft.

=== Chicago White Sox ===
On January 1, 2012, Jaye, along with Daniel Webb, was traded to the Chicago White Sox for Jason Frasor.

=== Texas Rangers ===
In December 2015, he was traded to the Texas Rangers for Will Lamb.

=== Detroit Tigers ===
On March 29, 2016, the Rangers traded Jaye alongside Bobby Wilson to the Detroit Tigers in exchange for Bryan Holaday.

The Tigers added Jaye to their 40-man roster after the 2016 season. On September 2, 2017, Jaye was called up to the Tigers and made his Major League debut. Jaye earned his first major league win in a September 5 game against the Kansas City Royals, pitching 2 1/3 scoreless innings in relief of starter Aníbal Sánchez. He was outrighted to Triple-A on November 2, 2017, and elected free agency on November 6.

=== Minnesota Twins ===
Jaye signed a minor league contract with the Minnesota Twins on November 30, 2017.

=== Cleveland Indians ===
On May 29, 2018, the Cleveland Indians acquired Jaye from the Twins in exchange for cash considerations. In 9 games (5 starts) for the Triple–A Columbus Clippers, he struggled to a 2–5 record and 9.62 ERA with 16 strikeouts across 29 innings. Jaye elected free agency following the season on November 2.
