= John Hicks (baseball) =

American baseball player (born 1989)

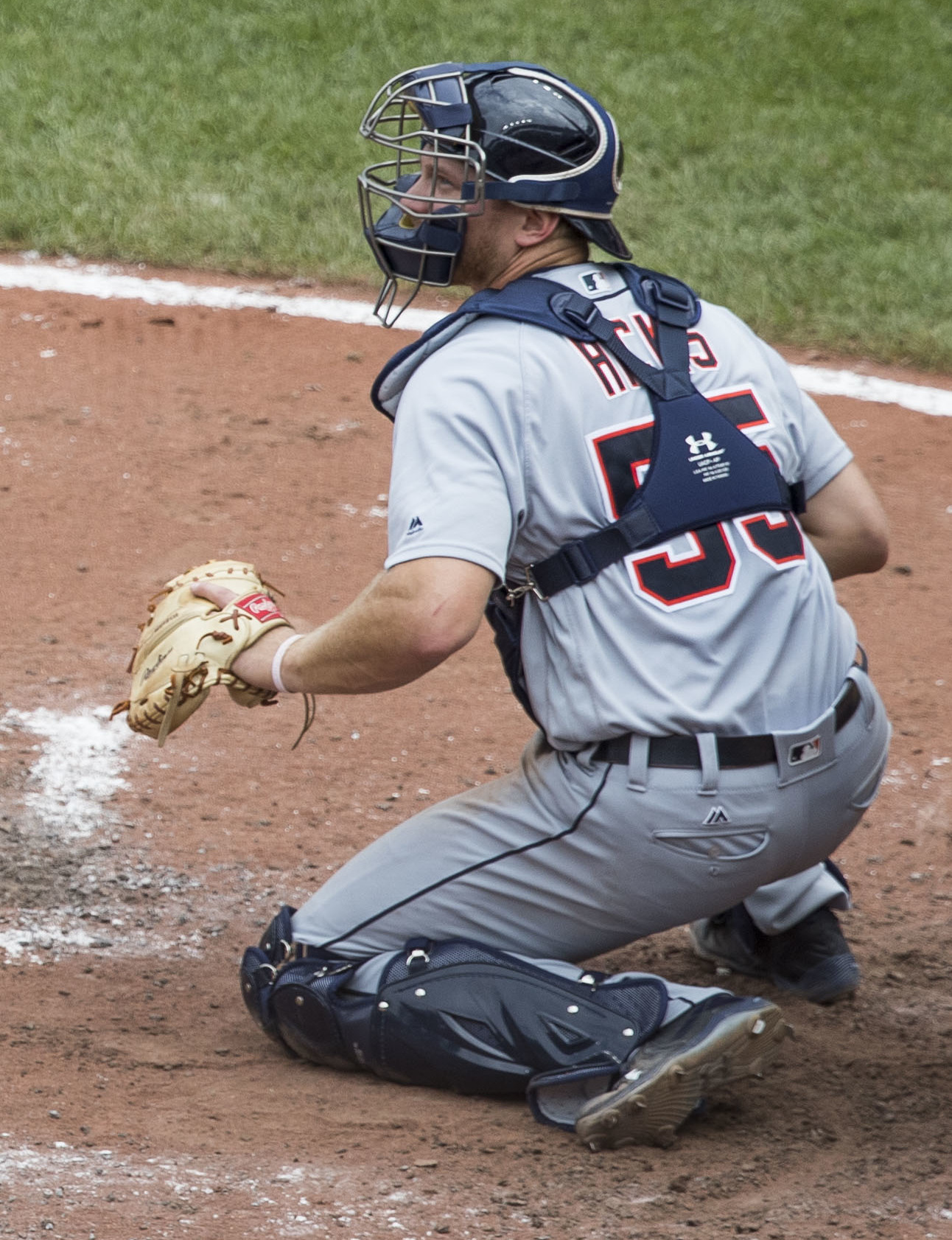
- Hicks with the Tigers in 2017
- Catcher / First baseman
- Born: August 31, 1989 (age 36); Richmond, Virginia, U.S.
- Batted: Right Threw: Right

MLB debut
- August 29, 2015, for the Seattle Mariners

Last MLB appearance
- July 21, 2021, for the Texas Rangers

MLB statistics
- Batting average: .236
- Home runs: 32
- Runs batted in: 97
- Stats at Baseball Reference

Teams
- Seattle Mariners (2015); Detroit Tigers (2016–2019); Texas Rangers (2021)

John Austin Hicks (born August 31, 1989) is an American former professional baseball catcher and first baseman. He played in Major League Baseball (MLB) for the Seattle Mariners, Detroit Tigers, and Texas Rangers.

== Playing career ==
=== Amateur ===
Hicks was drafted by the Los Angeles Angels of Anaheim in the 31st round of the 2008 Major League Baseball draft out of Goochland High School in Goochland, Virginia. He did not sign and played college baseball at the University of Virginia for the Cavaliers from 2009 to 2011. In 2010, he played collegiate summer baseball with the Harwich Mariners of the Cape Cod Baseball League.

=== Seattle Mariners ===
He was drafted by the Seattle Mariners in the fourth round of the 2011 Major League Baseball draft. He signed with the Mariners and made his professional debut that season with the Clinton LumberKings. He played 2012 with the High Desert Mavericks and 2013 with the Double-A Jackson Generals. Hicks started 2014 with Jackson and was promoted to the Triple-A Tacoma Rainiers.

The Mariners placed Hicks on their 40–man roster on November 20, 2014. He made his MLB debut with the Mariners on August 29, 2015. He was designated for assignment on November 23, 2015.

=== Minnesota Twins ===
The Minnesota Twins claimed Hicks off of waivers in December, 2015. He did not play a major league game with the Twins.

=== Detroit Tigers ===
==== 2016 ====
Hicks was claimed off waivers by the Detroit Tigers on April 23, 2016. He split time in the 2016 season between the Double-A Erie SeaWolves and the Triple-A Toledo Mud Hens. He was called up on September 1, 2016, when the rosters expanded and made his Tigers debut on September 10.

==== 2017 ====
Hicks began the 2017 season with the Mud Hens, where he batted .424 with 12 RBI in his first 10 games. On April 22, 2017, he was recalled by the Tigers and inserted into the starting lineup. In the next game, on April 23 against the Minnesota Twins, Hicks hit his first major league home run and had 5 RBI in a 3-for-5 game. After being optioned back to Toledo in June, Hicks was called back up on July 31, 2017, to replace Alex Avila, who had been traded. Hicks had two home runs in a September 5 game against the Kansas City Royals, the first multi-homer game of his career. In 173 at-bats during the 2017 season, Hicks hit .266 with 6 home runs.

==== 2018 ====
Hicks alternated between catcher and first base for the 2018 Tigers, playing the latter much more after the season-ending injury to Miguel Cabrera on June 12. On August 15, 2018, after being placed on the disabled list a week earlier for a groin strain, the Tigers announced that Hicks would need surgery to repair a core muscle defect which ended his season. He finished 2018 hitting .260 with 9 home runs and 32 RBI in 81 games.

==== 2019 ====
Hicks made the 2019 Tigers roster out of spring training. He split time at catcher with Grayson Greiner, Bobby Wilson and Jake Rogers while occasionally playing first base. Hicks finished 2019 hitting .210 with 13 home runs and 35 RBI in 319 at-bats. Hicks hit four game-winning home runs during the season, including a walk-off grand slam to beat the Baltimore Orioles in extra innings on September 14. Hicks was outrighted off the Tigers roster and elected free agency on October 24, 2019.

=== Arizona Diamondbacks ===
On January 27, 2020, Hicks signed to a minor league contract with the Arizona Diamondbacks organization. Hicks did not play in a game in 2020 due to the cancellation of the minor league season because of the COVID-19 pandemic. Hicks was released by the Diamondbacks organization on September 19.

=== Texas Rangers ===
On February 12, 2021, Hicks signed a minor league contract with the Texas Rangers organization that included an invitation to Spring Training. On June 29, Hicks was selected to the active roster, with catcher Jose Trevino out with an injury that would eventually force him to the injured list. Hicks hit four home runs in his first four games, the first player in franchise history to do so. On July 23, Hicks was designated for assignment by the Rangers upon Trevino's return from the injured list. In 10 games, he hit 8-31 with 4 HR and 7 RBI.

=== Chicago Cubs ===
On February 5, 2022, Hicks signed a minor league contract with the Chicago Cubs organization. In 95 games for the Triple-A Iowa Cubs, he batted .261/.313/.510 with 20 home runs, 56 RBI, and 10 stolen bases. Hicks elected free agency following the season on November 10.

=== Philadelphia Phillies ===
On November 18, 2022, Hicks signed a minor league deal with the Philadelphia Phillies organization. In 54 games for the Triple–A Lehigh Valley IronPigs, he hit .211/.288/.328 with 3 home runs, 23 RBI, and 11 stolen bases. Hicks was released by the Phillies on July 8, 2023.

== Coaching career ==
On June 11, 2024, it was announced that Hicks had returned to his alma mater, the University of Virginia, and joined the baseball program as a student assistant.

== Personal life ==
Hicks played youth baseball with Seattle Seahawks quarterback Russell Wilson. He is married. Hicks attended Goochland High School, which was where ace pitcher Justin Verlander had also attended a few years before him. The two later ended up being teammates on the Tigers together in 2017. Hicks caught 5 games for Verlander that year.
