= Efrén Navarro =

American baseball player (born 1986)

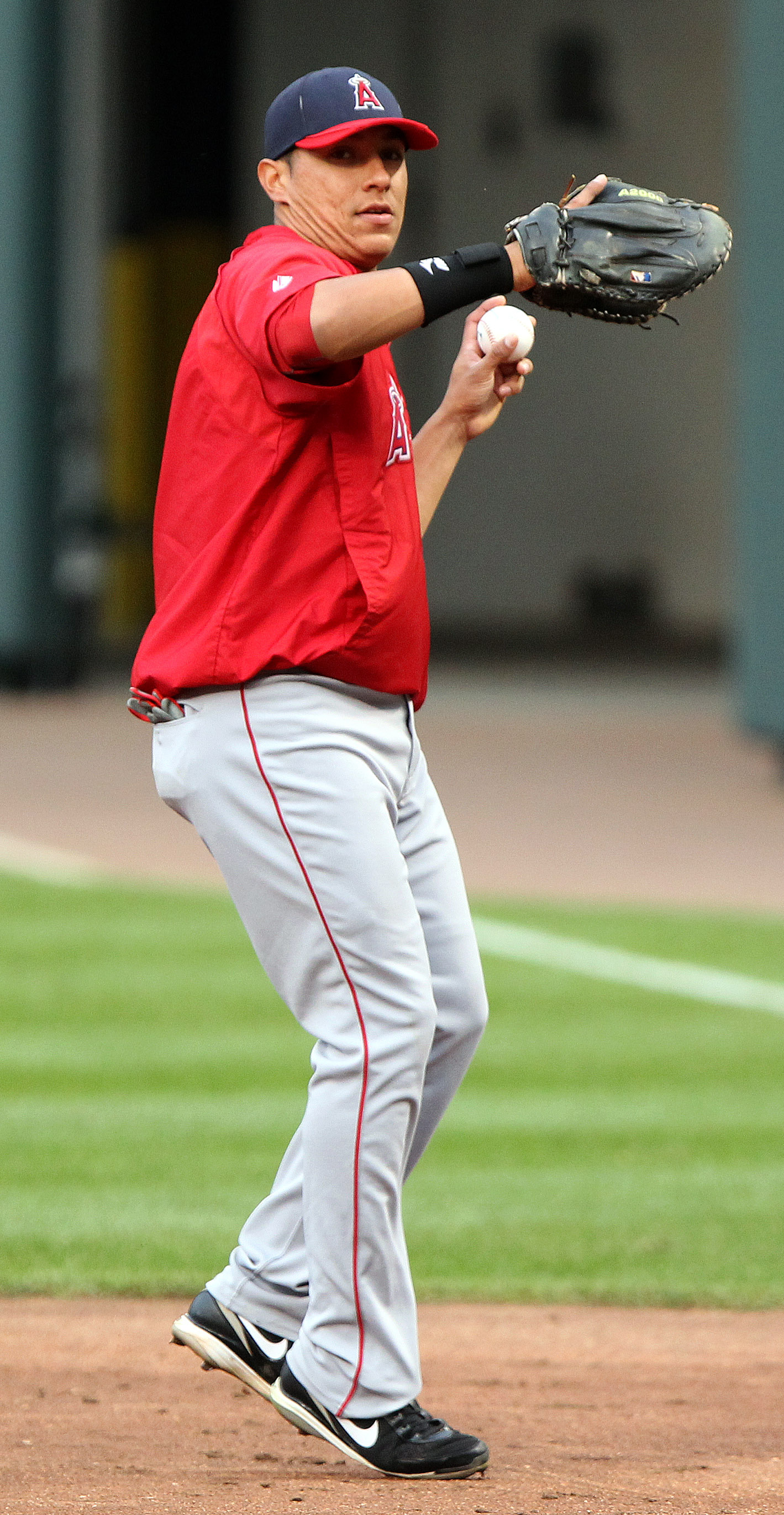
- Navarro with the Los Angeles Angels in 2011
- First baseman / Left fielder
- Born: May 14, 1986 (age 40); Lynwood, California, U.S.
- Batted: Left Threw: Left

Professional debut
- MLB: September 2, 2011, for the Los Angeles Angels of Anaheim
- NPB: June 29, 2018, for the Hanshin Tigers

Last appearance
- MLB: April 14, 2018, for the Chicago Cubs
- NPB: October 2, 2019, for the Hanshin Tigers

MLB statistics
- Batting average: .241
- Home runs: 3
- Runs batted in: 22

NPB statistics
- Batting average: .264
- Home runs: 3
- Runs batted in: 27
- Stats at Baseball Reference

Teams
- Los Angeles Angels of Anaheim (2011, 2013–2015); Detroit Tigers (2017); Chicago Cubs (2018); Hanshin Tigers (2018–2019)
Medals
Men's baseball
Representing Mexico
WBSC Premier12
Bronze medal – third place	2019 Tokyo	National team

Efrén Navarro (born May 14, 1986) is a Mexican-American former professional baseball first baseman and left fielder. He has previously played in Major League Baseball (MLB) for the Los Angeles Angels of Anaheim, Detroit Tigers and Chicago Cubs, and in Nippon Professional Baseball (NPB) for the Hanshin Tigers. He also plays on the Mexico national baseball team.

== Early life ==
Navarro was born in Lynwood, California. He graduated from Lynwood High School in Lynwood, California. His family is from San Lorenzo, Michoacán, México. He played college baseball at University of Nevada, Las Vegas.

== Professional career ==
=== Los Angeles Angels of Anaheim ===
Navarro was drafted by the Los Angeles Angels of Anaheim in the 50th round of the 2007 Major League Baseball draft.

He was a 2011 recipient of the Rawlings Gold Glove Award with the Salt Lake Bees. Navarro joined the Angels during September call-ups on September 1, 2011. Navarro spent the whole 2012 season in the minors, batting .294/.336/.403 for Salt Lake. Navarro played in 64 games for the Angels in 2013, hitting .245/.302/.340 in 159 at bats.

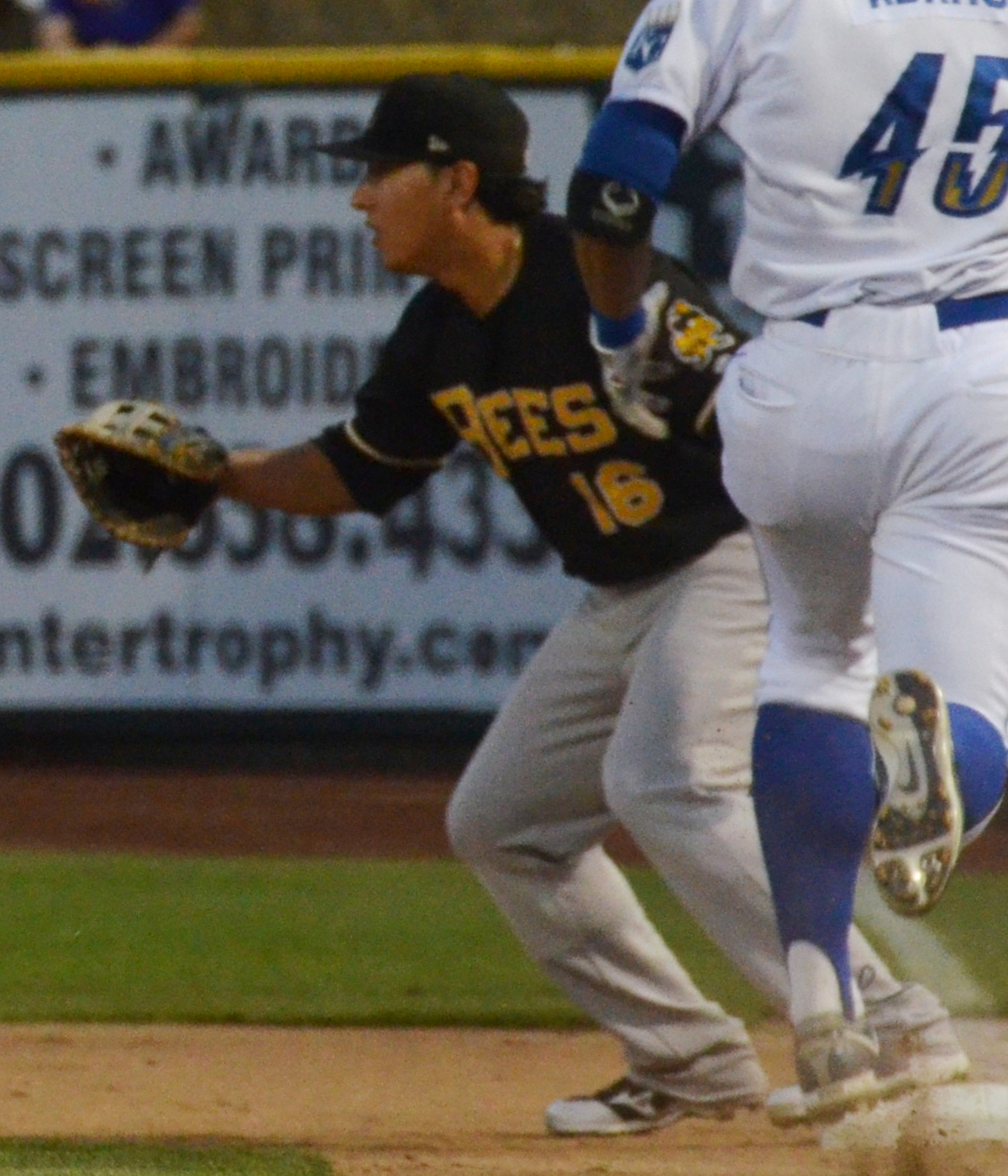
Navarro playing for the Salt Lake Bees in 2013.

Against the Seattle Mariners on July 18, 2014, Navarro came in to pinch-hit for John McDonald in the bottom of the 16th inning. He ripped the first pitch through to centerfield, driving in the winning run represented by Mike Trout who was on second base after hitting his 100th career double. It was Navarro's first career walk-off RBI and the first pinch-hit walk-off by an Angel since September 7, 2012. It was just the second pinch-hit walk-off in the 16th inning or later in Angels franchise history. Efren hit his first career home run off Justin Verlander on July 26.

Navarro was designated for assignment by the Angels on January 19, 2016.

=== Baltimore Orioles ===
On January 26, 2016, Navarro was traded to the Baltimore Orioles for cash considerations. He was designated for assignment on February 25, and elected free agency rather than accept a minor league assignment.

=== Seattle Mariners ===
On March 2, 2016, Navarro signed a minor league deal with the Seattle Mariners. He batted .243/.316/.362 for the Triple–A Tacoma Rainiers. He was released on July 4.

=== Toros de Tijuana ===
On July 5, 2016, Navarro signed with the Toros de Tijuana of the Mexican Baseball League. He appeared in one game for the team, going 1–for–2 (.500) with two walks. Navarro was released by Tijuana on July 7.

=== St. Louis Cardinals ===
On July 9, 2016, Navarro signed a minor league contract with the St. Louis Cardinals. In 54 games for the Triple–A Memphis Redbirds, he batted .320/.366/.376 with 2 home runs and 17 RBI. Navarro elected free agency following the season on November 7.

=== Detroit Tigers ===
On January 10, 2017, Navarro signed a minor league contract with the Detroit Tigers that included an invitation to spring training. On September 1, the Tigers purchased the contract of Navarro and that same day was selected in the starting lineup. He batted .276/.370/.395 with 10 home runs and 61 RBIs in 479 at bats for the Triple-A Toledo Mud Hens, and .230/.319/.377 in 61 at bats for the Tigers. Navarro was removed from the 40–man roster and sent outright to Triple–A on November 3. He elected free agency on November 6.

=== Chicago Cubs ===
On January 28, 2018, Navarro signed a minor league deal with the Chicago Cubs. The Cubs promoted him to the major leagues, where he had one hit in six at bats, on April 10 following Anthony Rizzo being placed on the DL. He was outrighted to the Triple–A Iowa Cubs on May 29, 2018, with whom he batted .310/.386/.440 with 4 home runs and 29 RBIs in 184 at bats. He was placed on the temporarily inactive list on June 8 following his decision to play in Japan, and later released on June 14.

=== Hanshin Tigers ===
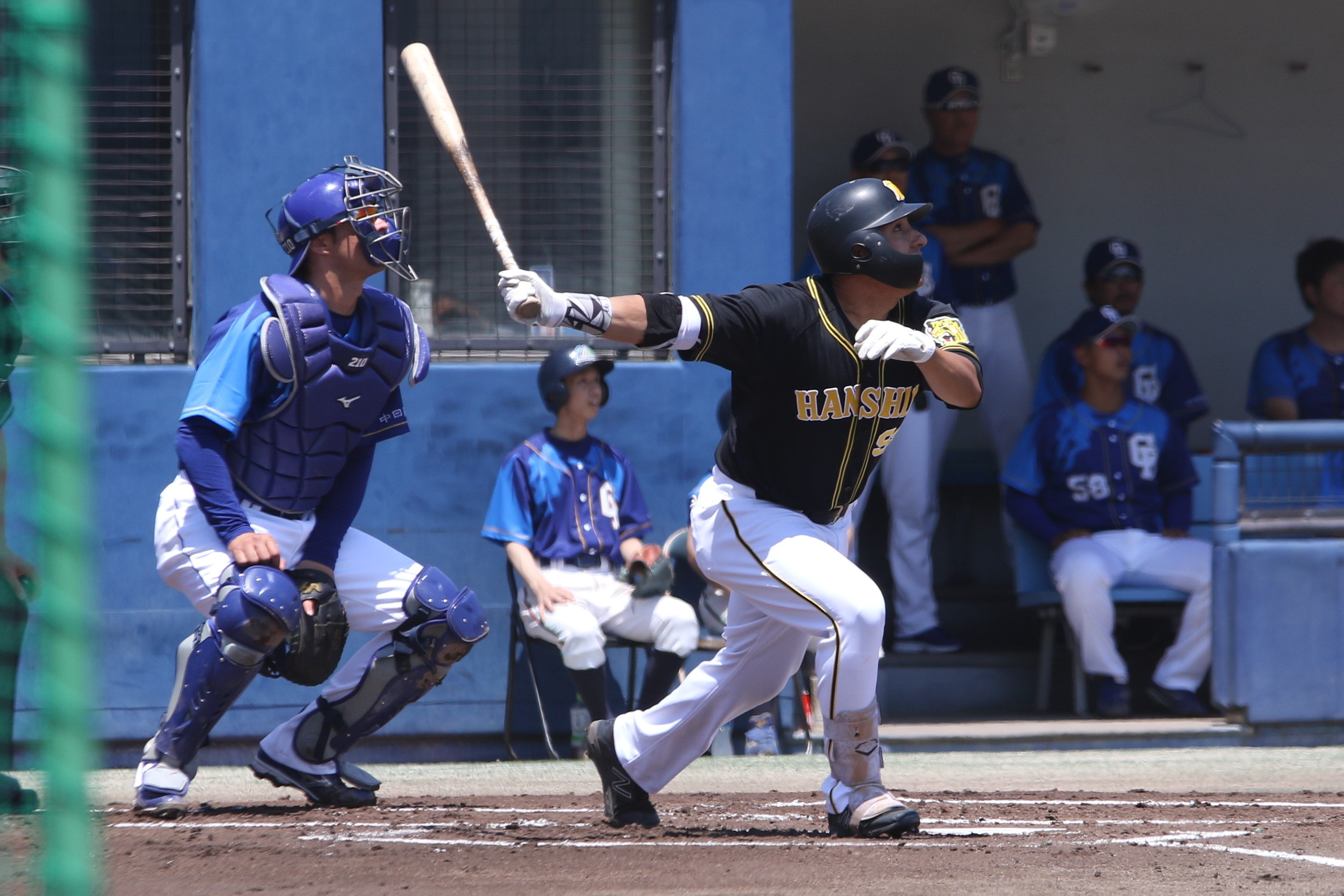
Navarro with the Hanshin Tigers in 2019

On June 15, 2018, Navarro signed with the Hanshin Tigers of Nippon Professional Baseball (NPB). On December 2, 2019, he became a free agent. After the 2019 season, he played for Tomateros de Culiacán of the Mexican Pacific League(LVMP).

=== Toros de Tijuana (second stint) ===
On February 10, 2020, Navarro signed with the Toros de Tijuana of the Mexican League. In 2020, he did not play a game because of the cancellation of the Mexican League season due to the COVID-19 pandemic. After the 2020 season, he played for Tomateros of the LVMP. He has also played for Mexico in the 2021 Caribbean Series.

Navarro played in 44 games for Tijuana in 2021, slashing .345/.472/.444 with 1 home run and 24 RBI. In 2022, Navarro played in 77 games for the Toros, hitting .300/.417/.466 with 10 home runs and 42 RBI. He began the 2023 season with the team, hitting .192 in 9 games.

=== Acereros de Monclova ===
On May 3, 2023, Navarro was traded to the Acereros de Monclova of the Mexican League in exchange for IF Noah Perio. In 59 games for Monclova, he hit .224/.359/.333 with three home runs and 29 RBI. On February 26, 2024, Navarro was released by the Acereros.

=== Piratas de Campeche ===
On April 10, 2024, Navarro signed with the Piratas de Campeche of the Mexican League. In 14 games for Campeche, he hit .256/.319/.395 with one home run and three RBI. Navarro was released by the Piratas on May 3.

== International career ==
Navarro was selected to the Mexico national baseball team at the 2013 World Baseball Classic, 2017 World Baseball Classic Qualification, 2017 World Baseball Classic, 2019 WBSC Premier12, and 2020 Summer Olympics.
