= Alex Wilson (baseball) =

American baseball player (born 1986)

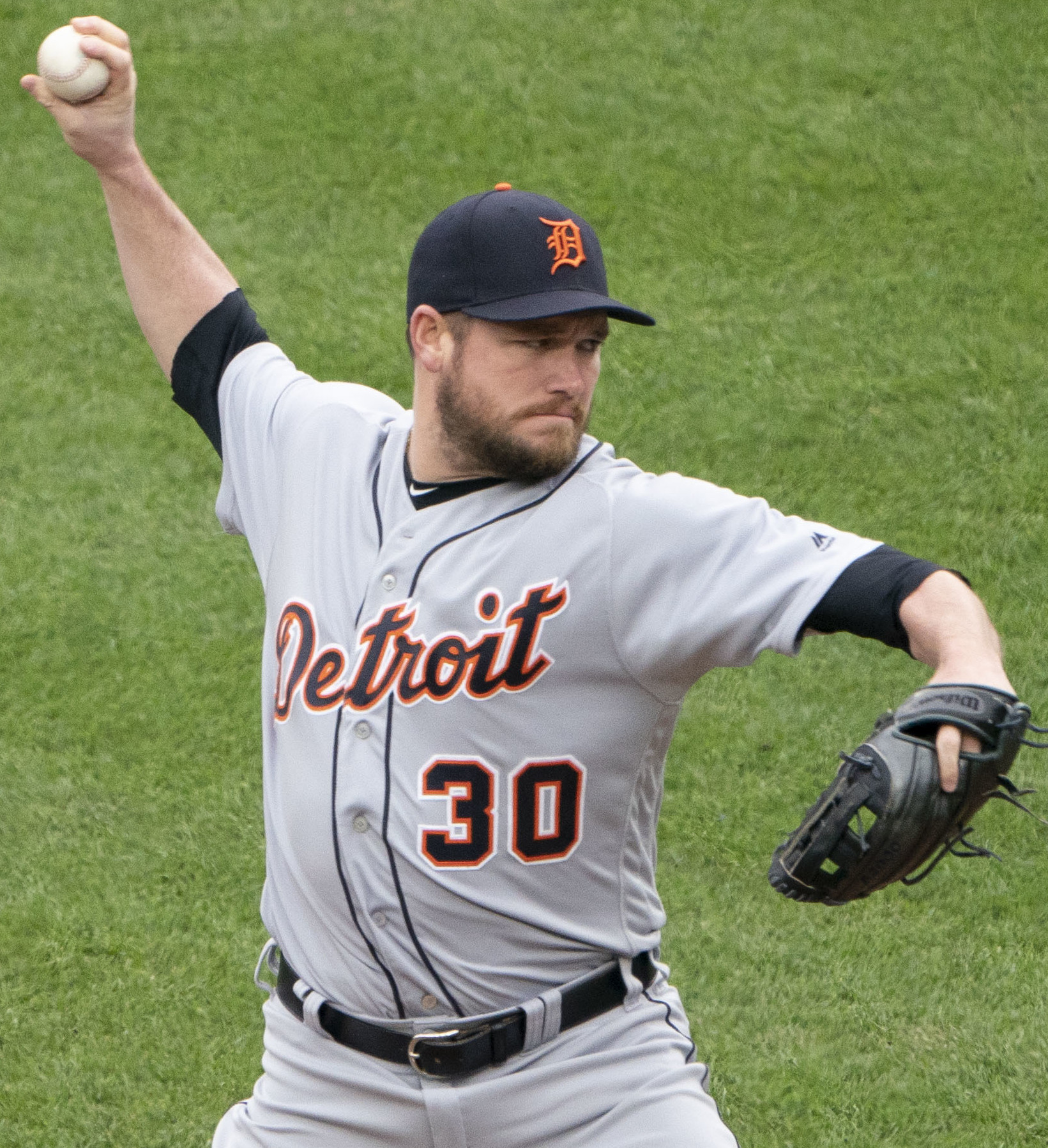
- Wilson with the Detroit Tigers in 2018
- Relief pitcher
- Born: November 3, 1986 (age 40); Dhahran, Saudi Arabia
- Batted: Right Threw: Right

MLB debut
- April 11, 2013, for the Boston Red Sox

Last MLB appearance
- April 27, 2019, for the Milwaukee Brewers

MLB statistics
- Win–loss record: 14–14
- Earned run average: 3.44
- Strikeouts: 226
- Stats at Baseball Reference

Teams
- Boston Red Sox (2013–2014); Detroit Tigers (2015–2018); Milwaukee Brewers (2019)
Medals
Men's baseball
Representing United States
World Baseball Classic
Gold medal – first place	2017 Los Angeles	Team

William Alexander Wilson (born November 3, 1986) is an American former professional baseball pitcher. He played in Major League Baseball (MLB) for the Boston Red Sox, Detroit Tigers and Milwaukee Brewers.

== Early life ==
Wilson was born in Dhahran, Saudi Arabia where his father, Jim Wilson, worked as a geologist for Aramco. Jim played college football in the NAIA at Hanover College before being cut by the Cincinnati Bengals, declining an offer from the Green Bay Packers and returning to graduate school.

The family moved to New Orleans when Wilson was two years old and then moved to Kingsport, Tennessee, where Wilson spent the majority of his youth. Wilson grew up as a Boston Red Sox fan.

== Career ==
=== College ===
Wilson attended Hurricane High School in Hurricane, West Virginia, then attended Winthrop University. Collegiate Baseball named him the National Freshman Pitcher of the Year in 2006. After the 2007 and 2008 seasons, he played collegiate summer baseball with the Falmouth Commodores of the Cape Cod Baseball League. In the summer of 2007, he had Tommy John surgery. He transferred to Texas A&M University in January 2008. He was drafted by the Chicago Cubs in the 10th Round of the 2008 Major League Baseball draft, but did not sign.

=== Boston Red Sox ===
Wilson was drafted by the Boston Red Sox in the 2nd round, with the 77th overall selection, of the 2009 Major League Baseball draft. On November 20, 2012, the Red Sox added Wilson to their 40-man roster to protect him from the Rule 5 Draft.

On March 16, 2013, Wilson was optioned to the Triple-A Pawtucket Red Sox to begin the season. He was called up to the Red Sox on April 7 when John Lackey went on the disabled list, and made his Major League debut on April 11. He was optioned to Pawtucket on May 29, and recalled on June 13 when Alfredo Aceves was optioned to Pawtucket.

Wilson pitched in the Major Leagues for parts of the 2013 and 2014 seasons. He threw 27 2/3 innings for the Red Sox in 2013 and posted a 4.88 ERA. He performed much better in his 28 1/3 Major League innings in 2014, recording a 1.91 ERA.

=== Detroit Tigers ===
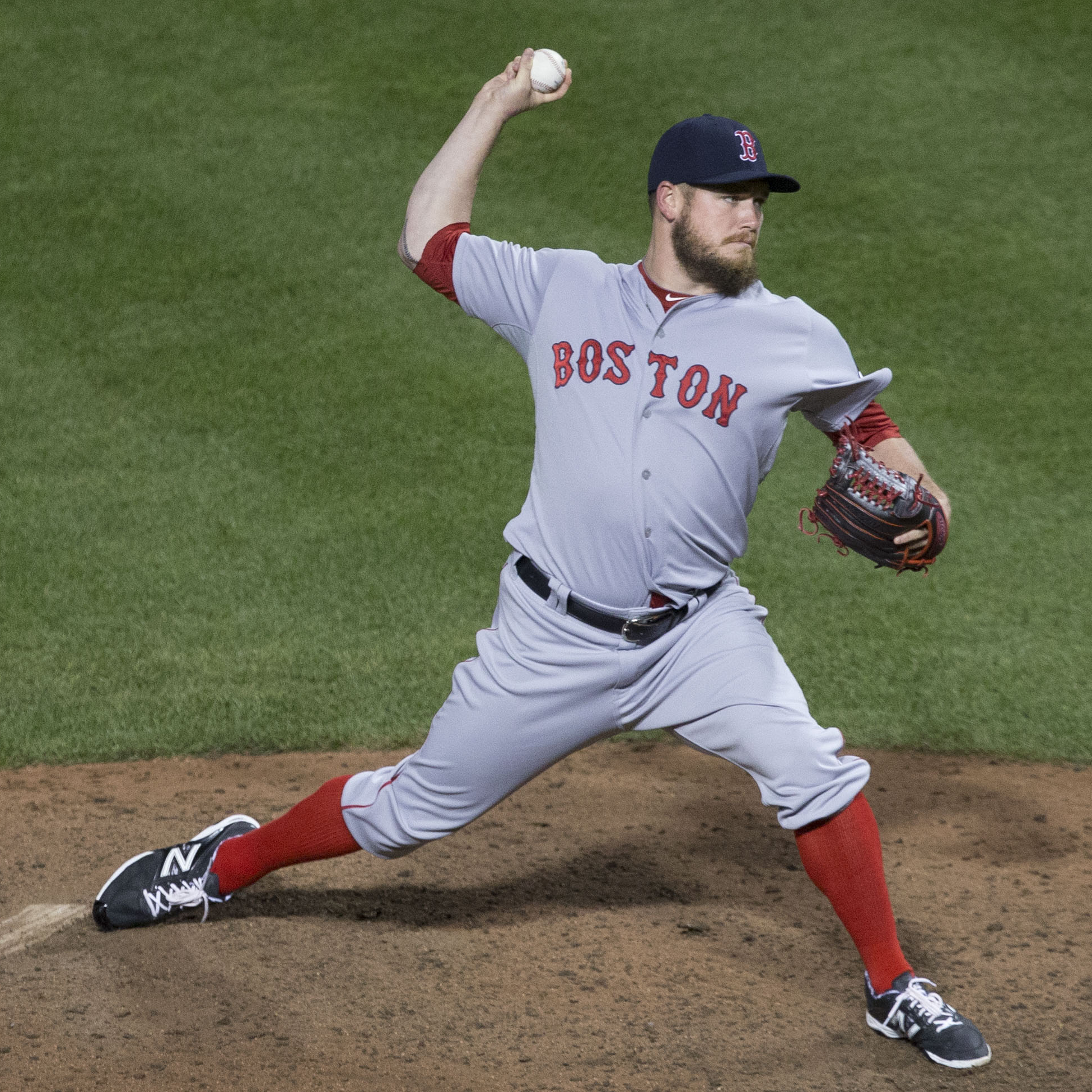
Wilson pitching for the Boston Red Sox in 2014

On December 11, 2014, the Red Sox traded Wilson along with Gabe Speier and Yoenis Céspedes to the Detroit Tigers for Rick Porcello.

On May 27, 2015, Alex Wilson made his first career major league start for the Detroit Tigers, against the Oakland Athletics, throwing 52 pitches in 3 scoreless innings. Detroit went on to win 3–2.

On July 30, 2015, Wilson earned his first major league save, getting the final five outs in a 9–8 Tigers win over the Baltimore Orioles. For the season, he pitched 70 innings (including a team-high 67 in relief), with 16 games finished, 2 saves, a 2.19 ERA and a 1.03 WHIP.

During the 2016 season, Wilson set career highs with 62 appearances and 73 innings, while posting a 4–0 record with a 2.96 ERA, with 49 strikeouts and 21 walks.

On January 13, 2017, the Tigers avoided arbitration with Wilson, agreeing on a one-year, $1.175 million contract. On August 25, Wilson was ejected for the first time in his Major League career after hitting Todd Frazier with a pitch. This followed after Miguel Cabrera and Austin Romine were ejected for triggering a bench-clearing brawl and after Dellin Betances was also ejected for the first time in his Major League career after hitting James McCann with a pitch. The next day, August 25, Wilson was suspended for four games. He appealed, and had the suspension reduced to three games, which he sat out beginning on September 2.

On September 23, 2017, Wilson sustained a non-displaced fractured right fibula after he was hit by a line drive off the bat of Joe Mauer, ending his season. During the 2017 season, Wilson posted a 2–5 record, 4.35 ERA, and 42 strikeouts in 60 innings pitched.

On January 17, 2018, the Tigers avoided arbitration with Wilson, agreeing on a one-year, $1.925 million contract. In a game on May 7, 2018, Wilson hurt his foot covering first base, and was later diagnosed with a plantar fascia strain. He was placed on the 10-day disabled list the next day. He returned to action for the Tigers on June 7. For the 2018 season, Wilson pitched 61 2/3 innings, posting a 3.36 ERA and 43 strikeouts. On November 30, 2018, the Tigers non-tendered Wilson and he elected free agency.

=== Cleveland Indians ===
On February 9, 2019, Wilson signed a minor league contract with the Cleveland Indians. The deal included an invitation to the Indians' major league spring training camp. He opted out of his contract with the Indians on March 21, 2019, after being informed he would not make the opening day major league roster.

=== Milwaukee Brewers ===
On March 24, 2019, Wilson signed with the Milwaukee Brewers on March 24. He was designated for assignment on April 29, 2019, and outrighted on May 1. He was released by the organization on August 3, 2019.

=== Chicago Cubs ===
On August 7, 2019, Wilson signed a minor league contract with the Chicago Cubs. In 10 games for the Triple–A Iowa Cubs, he posted a 1–2 record and 5.11 ERA with 11 strikeouts over 12 1/3 innings pitched. Wilson became a free agent following the season on November 4.

=== Detroit Tigers (second stint) ===
On January 4, 2020, Wilson signed a minor league contract with the Detroit Tigers that included an invitation to spring training. He did not play in a game in 2020 due to the cancellation of the minor league season because of the COVID-19 pandemic. Wilson was released by the Tigers organization on June 25.

Wilson announced his retirement from professional baseball on July 28, 2020, and joined the Ballengee Group as an advisor.

== Pitch selection ==
Wilson throws three primary pitches. He has a four-seam fastball that averages 92 mph (tops out at 97 mph), a two-seam fastball at 88-92 mph (tops out at 96 mph), and a slider in the 86-89 mph range (tops out at 91 mph). The two-seam fastball is used as both a cutter and a sinker. He throws the cutter more than any other pitch. Wilson also throws an occasional curveball and changeup.

== Personal life ==
Wilson is the second Saudi-born player in MLB history, after Craig Stansberry.

Wilson and his wife Kristin have three daughters and one son.
