= Chad Bell =

American baseball player (born 1989)

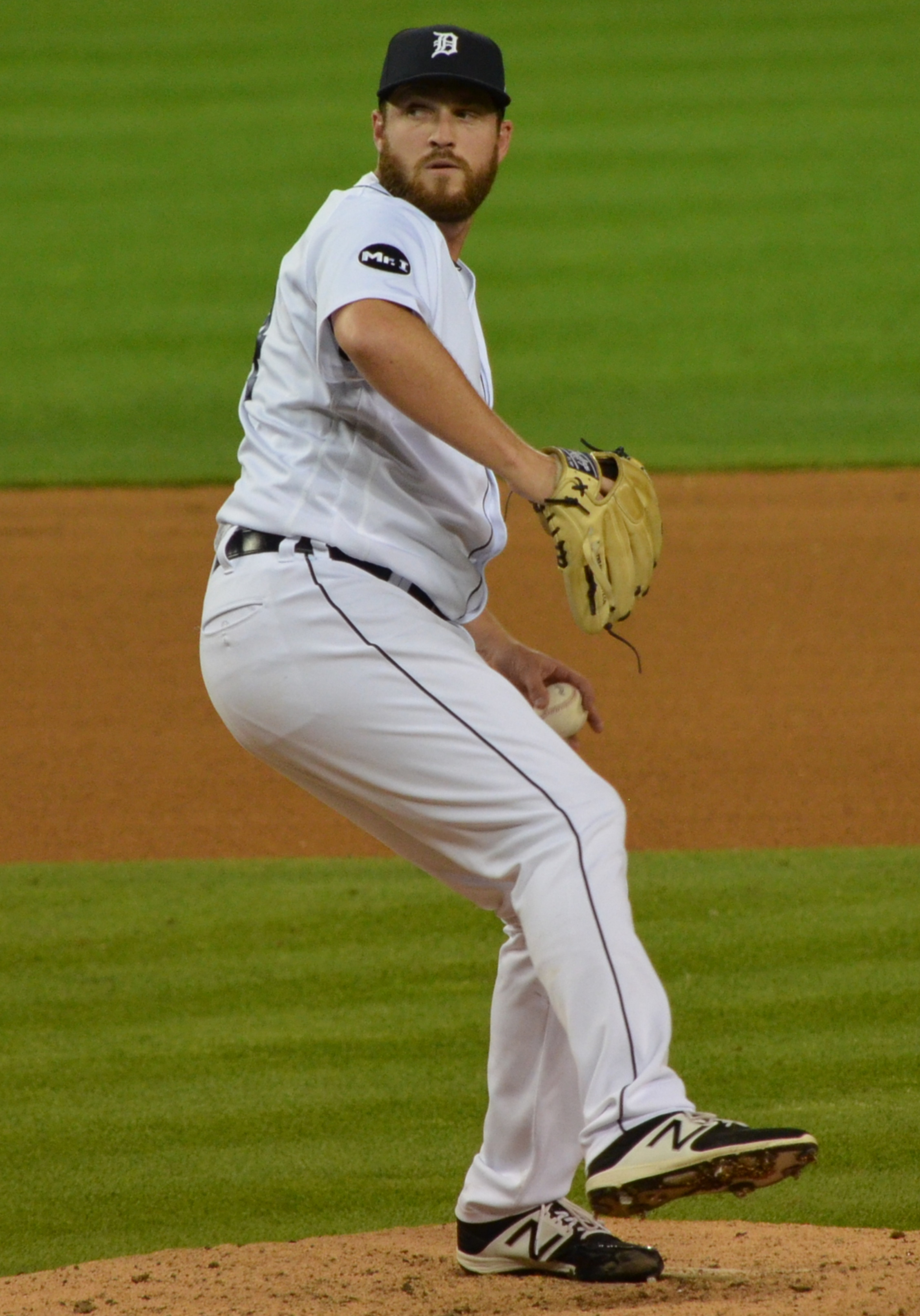
- Bell with the Detroit Tigers in 2017

Georgia State Panthers
- Pitcher / Coach
- Born: February 28, 1989 (age 37); Knoxville, Tennessee, U.S.
- Batted: Right Threw: Left

Professional debut
- MLB: May 10, 2017, for the Detroit Tigers
- KBO: March 24, 2019, for the Hanwha Eagles

Last appearance
- MLB: May 3, 2018, for the Detroit Tigers
- KBO: September 13, 2020, for the Hanwha Eagles

MLB statistics
- Win–loss record: 0–4
- Earned run average: 7.11
- Strikeouts: 64

KBO statistics
- Win–loss record: 13-18
- Earned run average: 4.25
- Strikeouts: 195
- Stats at Baseball Reference

Teams
- Detroit Tigers (2017–2018); Hanwha Eagles (2019–2020)

Chadwick Micah Bell (born February 28, 1989) is an American baseball coach and former professional baseball pitcher. He played in Major League Baseball (MLB) for the Detroit Tigers and in the KBO League for the Hanwha Eagles.

== Playing career ==
=== Texas Rangers ===
Bell attended South-Doyle High School in Knoxville, Tennessee and was drafted by the Milwaukee Brewers in the 25th round of the 2007 Major League Baseball draft. He did not sign and attended Walters State Community College. He was drafted by the Cleveland Indians in the 37th round of the 2008 MLB draft but again did not sign and returned to Walters State. He was then drafted by the Texas Rangers in the 14th round of the 2009 MLB draft and signed. After the 2009 season, he played collegiate summer baseball with the Cotuit Kettleers of the Cape Cod Baseball League.

=== Detroit Tigers ===
In May 2016, Bell was traded to the Detroit Tigers for Bobby Wilson. The Tigers added him to their 40-man roster after the season.

Bell was called up to the Tigers on May 1, 2017. Bell would end up pitching in 28 games after being called up two more times in 2017.

On April 12, 2018, the Tigers called up Bell to help in the bullpen. He was optioned back to Toledo eight days later. He was called up again on April 30, 2018, but sent down four days later after giving up five runs in his lone appearance out of the bullpen. On May 12, 2018, the Tigers designated Bell for assignment, removing him from the 40-man roster.

=== Atlanta Braves ===
Bell was claimed off waivers by the Atlanta Braves on May 15, 2018. On August 10, 2018, the Braves called up Bell but sent him back down the next day without using him in a game. On August 21, he was sent outright to the Triple-A Gwinnett Stripers. He elected free agency following the season on November 2.

=== Hanwha Eagles ===
On November 13, 2018, Bell signed with the Hanwha Eagles of the KBO League. He posted a 11–10 record with a 3.50 ERA and 134 strikeouts over 177 1/3 innings in 2019. Bell re–signed with Hanwha for the 2020 season. In 2020, Bell experienced forearm, shoulder, and elbow problems, and only pitched in 77 innings, pitching to a 5.96 ERA before he was released on October 6, 2020.

== Coaching career ==
On July 15, 2022, he was announced as the pitching coach of the Georgia State Panthers baseball team.
