= Bryan Holaday =

American baseball player (born 1987)

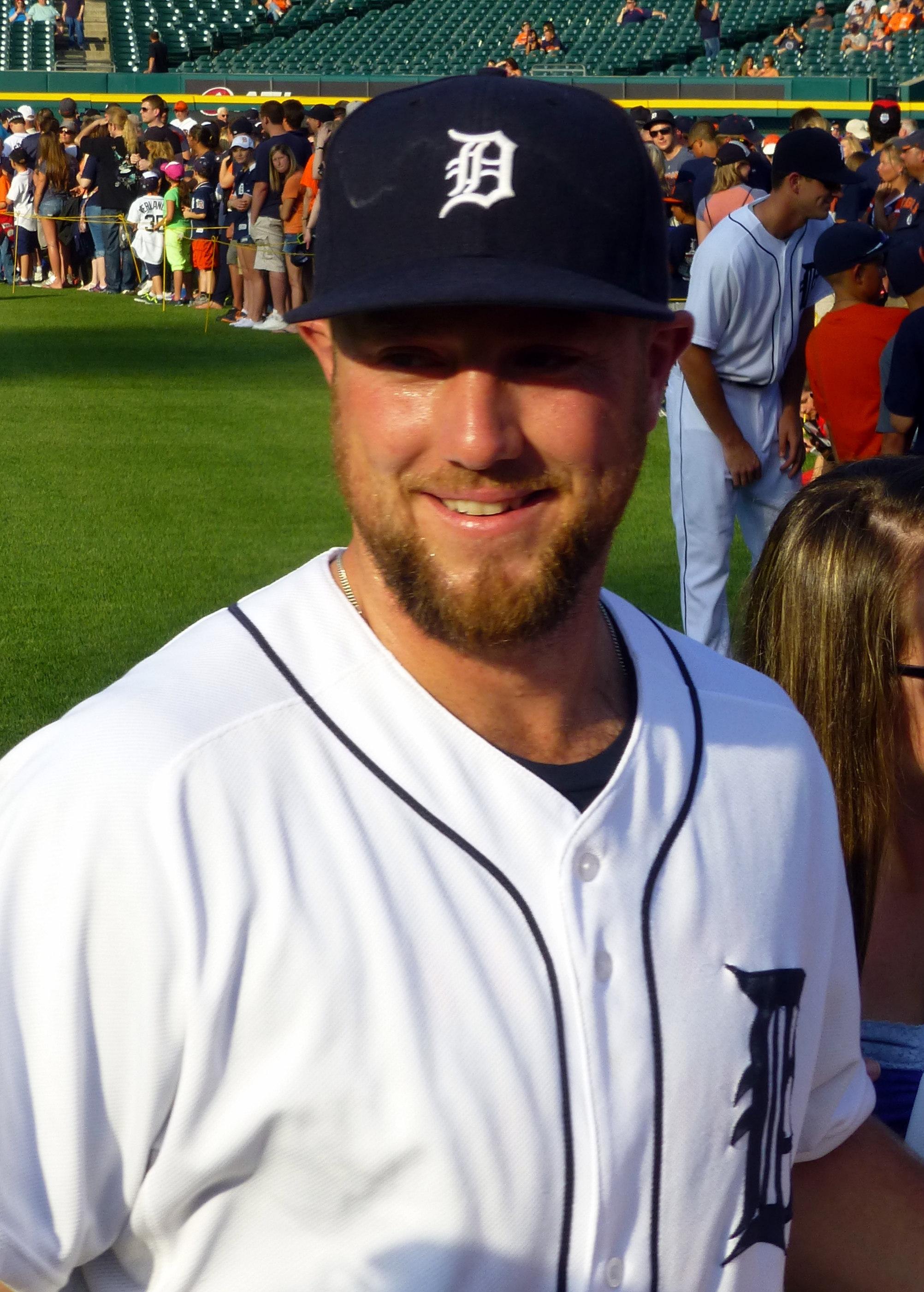
- Holaday with the Detroit Tigers in 2014
- Catcher
- Born: November 19, 1987 (age 38); Dallas, Texas, U.S.
- Batted: Right Threw: Right

MLB debut
- June 6, 2012, for the Detroit Tigers

Last MLB appearance
- August 28, 2021, for the Arizona Diamondbacks

MLB statistics
- Batting average: .236
- Home runs: 10
- Runs batted in: 79
- Stats at Baseball Reference

Teams
- Detroit Tigers (2012–2015); Texas Rangers (2016); Boston Red Sox (2016); Detroit Tigers (2017); Miami Marlins (2018–2019); Baltimore Orioles (2020); Arizona Diamondbacks (2021)

Career highlights and awards
- Johnny Bench Award (2010)

John Bryan Holaday (born November 19, 1987) is an American former professional baseball catcher. He made his Major League Baseball (MLB) debut on June 6, 2012, with the Detroit Tigers. He also played in MLB for the Texas Rangers, Boston Red Sox, Miami Marlins, Baltimore Orioles, and Arizona Diamondbacks. Prior to his professional career, Holaday played college baseball at Texas Christian University (TCU) for the TCU Horned Frogs. In his senior season at TCU, Holaday won the Johnny Bench Award, given to the best collegiate catcher for the season.

== Amateur career ==
Holaday attended W. T. White High School in Dallas, Texas, where he played for the school's baseball team. Holaday was a two-way player, appearing as both a pitcher and shortstop. In 2006, he was named to the Class 5A All-State Third Team by the Texas Sports Writers Association. Opposing teams began to consistently walk Holaday, leading the team's head coach to use him as the team's leadoff hitter. He competed in the Connie Mack World Series after the 2006 season.

After graduating in 2006, he enrolled at North Central Texas College, where he was initially a third baseman. During the season, he transitioned into a catcher. During the summer of 2007, he played collegiate summer baseball for the McKinney Marshals of the Texas Collegiate League.

Holaday transferred to Texas Christian University (TCU) before his sophomore season, becoming the starting catcher for the TCU Horned Frogs baseball team. After the 2009 season, he played collegiate summer baseball with the Brewster Whitecaps of the Cape Cod Baseball League. In 2010, his senior season, he batted .355 17 home runs, 53 runs batted in (RBIs), and 72 runs scored in 68 games played. He was credited for his work with the Horned Frogs' pitching staff, especially freshman Matt Purke. He led the Horned Frogs to the Mountain West Conference (MWC) tournament, winning the tournament Most Valuable Player award. He was also named the Most Outstanding Player of the Houston College Classic. Holaday was named to the All-MWC first team, though TCU coach Jim Schlossnagle indicated that he felt Holaday should have won the player of the year award over C. J. Cron, due to his contributions as a batter and as a fielder. TCU reached the 2010 College World Series (CWS), the school's first CWS appearance. Holaday was named to the CWS All-Tournament Team. He was also named a Second Team All-American and won the Johnny Bench Award as the top collegiate catcher for the season.

== Professional career ==
=== Detroit Tigers ===
The Detroit Tigers selected Holaday in the sixth round of the 2010 Major League Baseball draft. He signed, and played for the Lakeland Tigers of the High-A Florida State League that season. Holaday attended Tigers' spring training as a non-roster invitee in 2011. He played for the Erie SeaWolves of the Eastern League, the Tigers Double-A affiliate, during the 2011 season. Holaday was again invited to spring training as a non-roster invitee in 2012, and started the season with the Toledo Mud Hens of the Triple-A International League, where he batted .248 with no home runs and ten RBI.

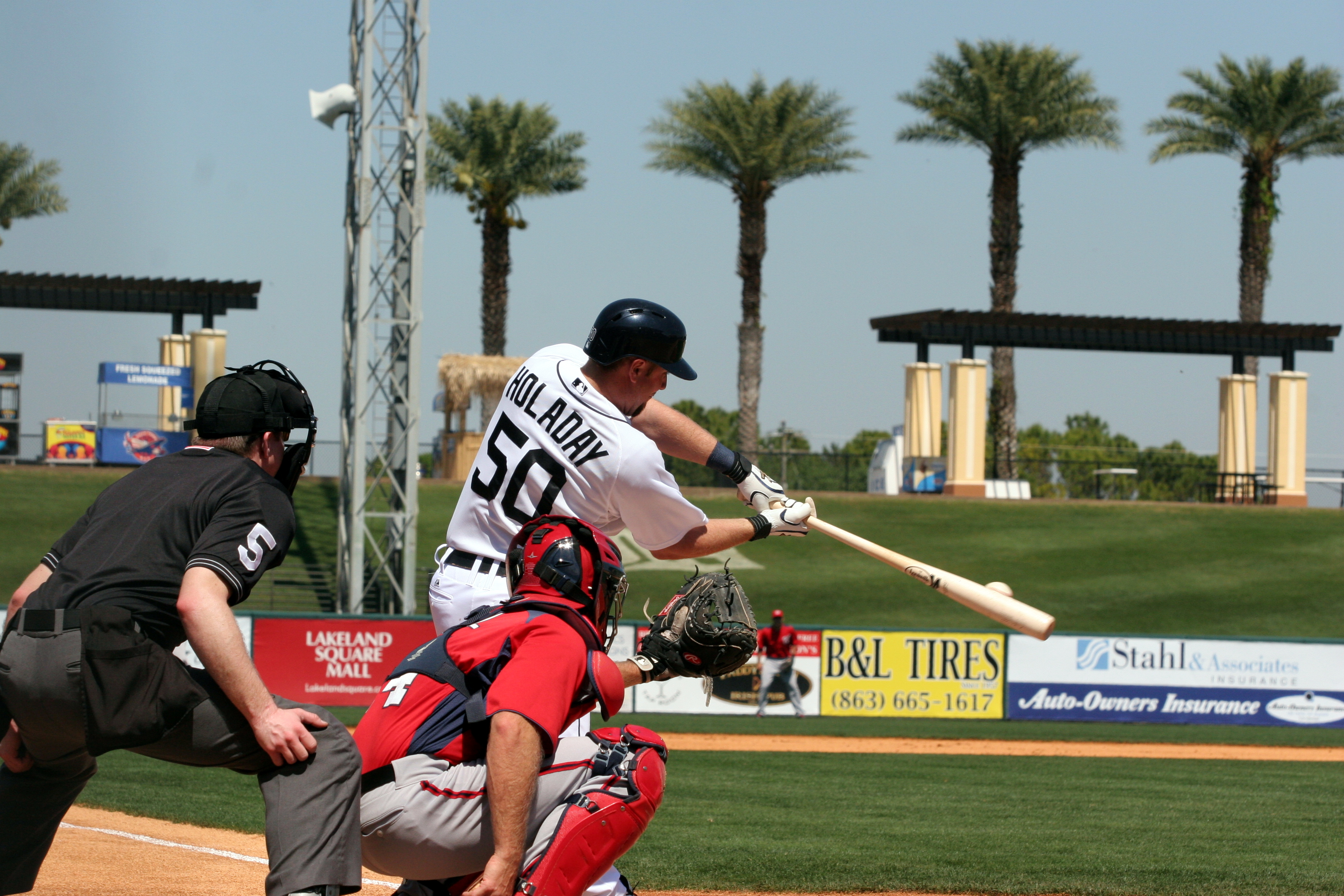
Holaday batting during spring training in 2013

The Tigers promoted Holaday to the major leagues for the first time on June 6, 2012, as the team added him to their 40-man roster due to injuries to starting catcher Alex Avila. He became the third position player selected in the 2010 draft to reach the majors, following Bryce Harper and Kole Calhoun. Holaday made his MLB debut that day. He had one hit against Jeanmar Gomez in four at bats during his debut.

Holaday was recalled June 17, 2013, when catcher Alex Avila was placed on the disabled list. For the season he batted .296/.367/.444. After the 2013 season, the Tigers informed backup catcher Brayan Peña they would not re-sign him, giving Holaday the opportunity to become the backup to Avila. Holaday competed with James McCann to be the backup catcher behind Avila during spring training in 2015. McCann won the competition, and Holaday began the season in the minor leagues. For the season in the majors, he batted .281/.292/.453.

Once again, Holaday entered spring training in 2016 competing for a backup role, this time with Jarrod Saltalamacchia. Despite losing the job, Holaday attracted large amounts of trade interest due to hitting .438/.455/.969 in 16 games and his lack of minor league options remaining. In 4 seasons with the Tigers, Holaday hit .251/.283/.340 with 3 HR and 30 RBI in 108 games.

=== Texas Rangers ===
On March 29, 2016, the Tigers traded Holaday to the Texas Rangers in exchange for Bobby Wilson and Myles Jaye. Holaday began 2016 sharing catching duties with Robinson Chirinos. Following the acquisition of Jonathan Lucroy, Holaday was designated for assignment.

=== Boston Red Sox ===
The Boston Red Sox claimed Holaday off of waivers on August 5, 2016. In 14 appearances for Boston, he went 7-for-33 (.212) with no home runs and one RBI. On December 2, the Red Sox non-tendered Holaday, making him a free agent.

=== Philadelphia Phillies ===
On December 20, 2016, Holaday signed a minor league deal with the Philadelphia Phillies. After being informed that he would not make Philadelphia's roster to begin the season, Holaday opted out of his contract.

=== Detroit Tigers (second stint) ===
On March 31, 2017, the Tigers signed Holaday to a minor league contract and assigned him to the Toledo Mud Hens. On September 1, the Tigers purchased Holaday's contract. At the time of his call-up, Holaday was hitting .269 with 12 home runs and 50 RBI in 93 games for Toledo. He was outrighted to Triple-A on November 3, and elected free agency on November 7.

=== Miami Marlins ===
On December 1, 2017, Holaday signed a minor league contract with the Miami Marlins. Holaday's contract was purchased by the Marlins on March 28, 2018, after he made the team's Opening Day roster. In 61 appearances for Miami, he slashed .205/.261/.258 with one home run and 16 RBI. On October 27, Holaday was removed from the 40-man roster and sent outright to the Triple-A New Orleans Baby Cakes. He subsequently rejected the assignment and elected free agency.

On November 26, 2018, Holaday re-signed with the Marlins on a minor league contract. He was released on March 23, 2019, after opting out of his contract. However, Holaday re-signed with Miami on another minor league contract on March 26. On May 24, he was selected to the active roster after Chad Wallach suffered a concussion. In 43 games for the Marlins, Holaday slashed .278/.344/.435 with four home runs and 12 RBI. On October 18, he was removed from the 40-man roster and sent outright to Triple-A, but elected free agency in lieu of the assignment.

=== Baltimore Orioles ===
On January 13, 2020, Holaday signed a minor league deal with the Baltimore Orioles that included an invitation to spring training. On August 1, Holaday was selected to the active roster. In 2020 for the Orioles, Holaday slashed .161/.212/.194 with no home runs and four RBI.

=== Arizona Diamondbacks ===
On January 11, 2021, Holaday signed a minor league contract with the Arizona Diamondbacks organization. On March 26, 2021, Holaday was released by the Diamondbacks, but re-signed with the club on a new minor league contract the next day. On July 3, Holaday was selected to the active roster. Holaday appeared in 13 games for Arizona, hitting .194 with no home runs and one RBI. On August 29, Holaday was released by the Diamondbacks.

On March 6, 2022, Holaday announced his retirement from professional baseball via Instagram.

== Personal life ==
Holaday's older brother, Bobby, also played for the baseball team at Warren Travis White High School.
