= John Sullivan (catcher) =

American baseball player (1941–2023)

- Catcher
- Born: January 3, 1941; Somerville, New Jersey, U.S.
- Died: June 1, 2023 (aged 82); Wayland, New York, U.S.
- Batted: Left Threw: Right

MLB debut
- September 20, 1963, for the Detroit Tigers

Last MLB appearance
- August 7, 1968, for the Philadelphia Phillies

MLB statistics
- Batting average: .228
- Home runs: 2
- Runs batted in: 18

Teams
- Detroit Tigers (1963–1965); New York Mets (1967); Philadelphia Phillies (1968); As coach: Kansas City Royals (1979); Atlanta Braves (1980–1981); Toronto Blue Jays (1982–1993)

Career highlights and awards
- 2× World Series champion (1992, 1993)

John Peter Sullivan (January 3, 1941 – June 1, 2023) was an American Major League Baseball catcher and coach. A left-handed batter who threw right-handed, Sullivan stood 6 feet (180 cm) tall and weighed 195 pounds (88 kg) as an active player.

== Playing career ==
After graduating from Bernards High School near his hometown of Somerville, New Jersey, Sullivan signed with the Detroit Tigers in 1959 and made his debut with them in the waning days of the 1963 season. He played in five major league seasons with Detroit (1963–65), the New York Mets (1967), and Philadelphia Phillies (1968), appearing in 116 games, with 59 hits in 259 at bats, batting .228 with two home runs and 18 runs batted in. His only substantial terms of MLB service were as a reserve catcher for the 1965 Tigers and 1967 Mets, for whom he played his only full season in MLB. He played eight years at the Triple-A level, including Rochester Red Wings, which was close to his wife's family in the Finger Lakes area.

== Coaching career ==
Sullivan managed in minor league baseball in the Kansas City Royals' farm system. During six seasons, he rose from Rookie ball to Triple-A, winning four league championships and compiling a stellar .601 winning percentage (434 victories and 288 defeats). His only under .500 club, the 1978 Omaha Royals, who finished 66–69, nevertheless topped their division and defeated the Indianapolis Indians for the American Association championship.

In 1979, Sullivan began a 15-year run as a Major League coach, serving with the Royals (1979), Atlanta Braves (1980–81), and Toronto Blue Jays (1982–93). He was brought to Toronto by Bobby Cox after Cox's first term as Braves' manager, and remained with the club under Cox's successors Jimy Williams and Cito Gaston, coaching on the Blue Jays' 1992 and 1993 World Series championship teams. His final game was Game 6 of the 1993 World Series, during which he caught Joe Carter's game-winning home run in the bullpen. Sullivan's retirement was announced at the Blue Jays' championship celebration, and he was asked to unveil the 1993 World Series Championship banner at the end of festivities.

Sullivan's family called Dansville, New York, home from 1973 on. He died in nearby Wayland, New York, on June 1, 2023, at the age of 82.
