= Bobby Wilson (baseball) =

American baseball player & coach (born 1983)

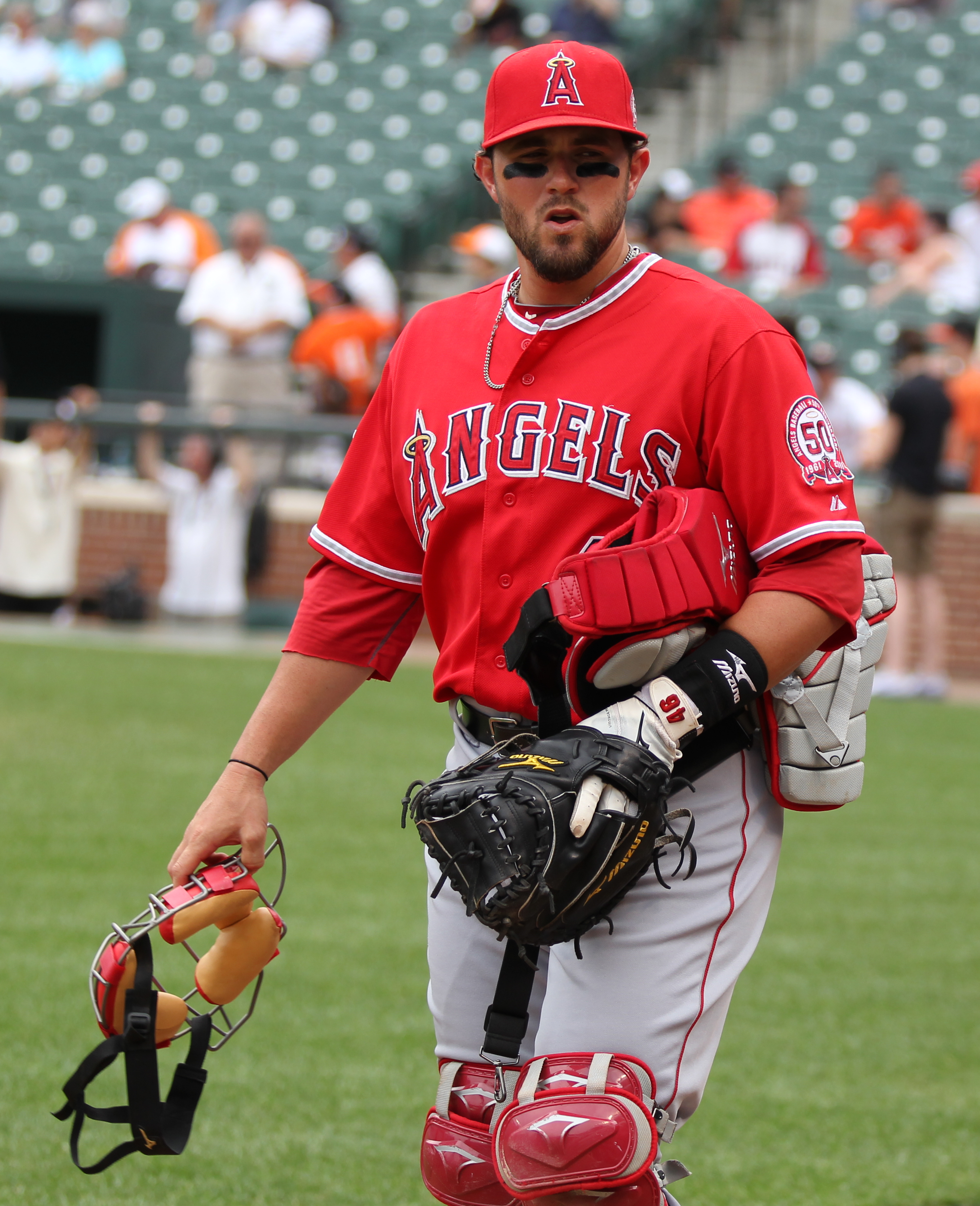
- Wilson with the Angels in 2011

Washington Nationals – No. 88
- Catcher
- Born: April 8, 1983 (age 43); Dunedin, Florida, U.S.
- Batted: Right Threw: Right

MLB debut
- April 28, 2008, for the Los Angeles Angels of Anaheim

Last MLB appearance
- July 27, 2019, for the Detroit Tigers

MLB statistics
- Batting average: .203
- Home runs: 18
- Runs batted in: 102
- Stats at Baseball Reference

Teams
- As player: Los Angeles Angels of Anaheim (2008–2012); Arizona Diamondbacks (2014); Tampa Bay Rays (2015); Texas Rangers (2015); Detroit Tigers (2016); Texas Rangers (2016); Tampa Bay Rays (2016); Minnesota Twins (2018); Detroit Tigers (2019); As coach: Texas Rangers (2021–2025); Washington Nationals (2026–present)

Career highlights and awards
- World Series champion (2023)

Robert Louis Wilson (born April 8, 1983) is an American former professional baseball catcher and current coach for the Washington Nationals of Major League Baseball (MLB). He played in MLB for the Los Angeles Angels of Anaheim, Arizona Diamondbacks, Tampa Bay Rays, Texas Rangers, Minnesota Twins, and Detroit Tigers. He has also previously coached in MLB for the Texas Rangers.

== Amateur career ==
Originally from Dunedin, Florida, Wilson attended Seminole High School. At Seminole High, Wilson was part of a team that won the state and national championship and finished an undefeated 31–0. Wilson then attended St. Petersburg College in St. Petersburg, Florida.

== Professional career ==
=== Los Angeles Angeles of Anaheim ===
Wilson began the 2008 season for the Salt Lake Bees, the Angels' Triple-A affiliate. He began the season hitting .339 in 16 games with no home runs and 12 RBI. On April 28, 2008, Wilson was recalled by the major league club and made his major league debut on that same day against the Oakland Athletics. He came in as a defensive replacement for Mike Napoli and in his first at-bat, hit a single off Dallas Braden.

On April 23, 2010, while playing catcher for the Angels against the New York Yankees, Wilson was involved in a head-on collision with Mark Teixeira, who was attempting to slide into home. Wilson was knocked away, injuring his head and ankle. Mike Napoli then came in and caught the remainder of the game.

On July 27, 2011, Wilson caught Ervin Santana's no-hitter against the Cleveland Indians, nearly two years after catching Sean O'Sullivan's no-hitter with Triple-A Salt Lake Bees on July 28, 2009.

=== Toronto Blue Jays ===
On October 22, 2012, Wilson was claimed off waivers by the Toronto Blue Jays. Pitcher Chad Beck was designated for assignment to make room on the 40-man roster for Wilson. On November 30, the Blue Jays announced that they were not offering Wilson a contract for 2013, and he became a free agent.

=== New York Yankees ===
On December 13, 2012, the Yankees signed Wilson to a minor league contract with an invitation to spring training.

=== Arizona Diamondbacks ===
Wilson signed a minor league contract with an invite to Spring Training with the Arizona Diamondbacks in October 2013. He declined a minor league assignment on October 12, becoming a free agent.

=== Tampa Bay Rays ===
On December 12, 2014, he signed a minor league deal with the Tampa Bay Rays.

On April 5, 2015, the Rays selected his contract from their Triple-A affiliate, the Durham Bulls. On June 14, the Rays sent him outright to Triple-A. He was called back up on July 29.

=== Texas Rangers ===
On July 31, 2015, Wilson was claimed off waivers by the Texas Rangers. In his debut with the Rangers, Wilson went 2–4 with 2 RBI against the San Francisco Giants.

=== Detroit Tigers ===
On March 29, 2016, the Texas Rangers traded Wilson and Myles Jaye to the Detroit Tigers in exchange for Bryan Holaday. Wilson was called up from the Toledo Mud Hens on April 12, 2016, when James McCann was placed on the disabled list.

=== Return to Texas ===
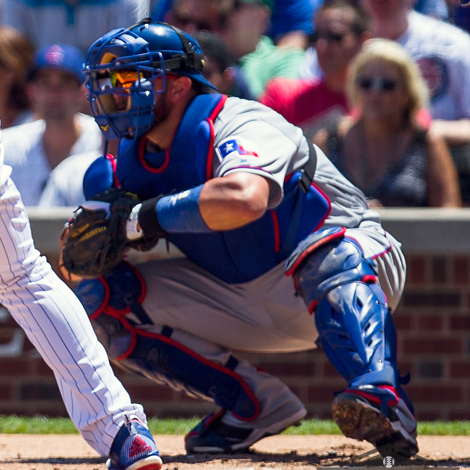
Wilson's second stint with the Texas Rangers in 2016

On May 3, 2016, the Tigers traded Wilson back to Texas in exchange for pitcher Chad Bell. Wilson was effective in his return, hitting .250 with two grand slams. Wilson was designated for assignment after the Texas Rangers acquired all star catcher Jonathan Lucroy from the Milwaukee Brewers.

=== Tampa Bay Rays (second stint) ===
On August 4, 2016, the Tampa Bay Rays claimed Wilson off waivers from the Rangers. He was activated on the 25-man roster on August 5. Wilson finished his 2016 with a .230 batting average. On November 14, Wilson elected free agency after clearing outright waivers.

=== Los Angeles Dodgers ===
On January 3, 2017, Wilson signed a minor league contract with the Los Angeles Dodgers organization. He was assigned to the Triple-A Oklahoma City Dodgers to begin the season. In 75 games, he hit .243 with 11 homers and 45 RBI. Wilson elected free agency following the season on November 6.

=== Minnesota Twins ===
On November 30, 2017, Wilson signed a minor league contract with the Minnesota Twins. Wilson became the backup catcher to Mitch Garver after Jason Castro was ruled out for the rest of the 2018 season after suffering a torn meniscus.

=== Chicago Cubs ===
On August 30, 2018, Wilson was traded to the Chicago Cubs in exchange for Chris Gimenez and cash.

=== Detroit Tigers (second stint) ===
On December 4, 2018, Wilson signed a minor league deal with the Detroit Tigers. He was released on March 22, 2019. He re-signed a minor league deal with the Tigers on March 24. The Tigers selected his contract on June 14, and he was promoted to the major league club. On July 28, the Tigers placed Wilson on outright waivers. He hit .091 in 15 games. He elected free agency on October 1.

== Coaching career ==
On December 9, 2019, Wilson was hired by the Texas Rangers organization to serve as the manager of the Frisco RoughRiders. On October 26, 2020, Wilson was named the Rangers catching coordinator and went on to be part of the 2023 World Series Champions.

Ahead of the 2026 season, Wilson departed Texas and took a job as catching coach of the Washington Nationals, under first-year manager Blake Butera.
