= JaCoby Jones =

American baseball player (born 1992)

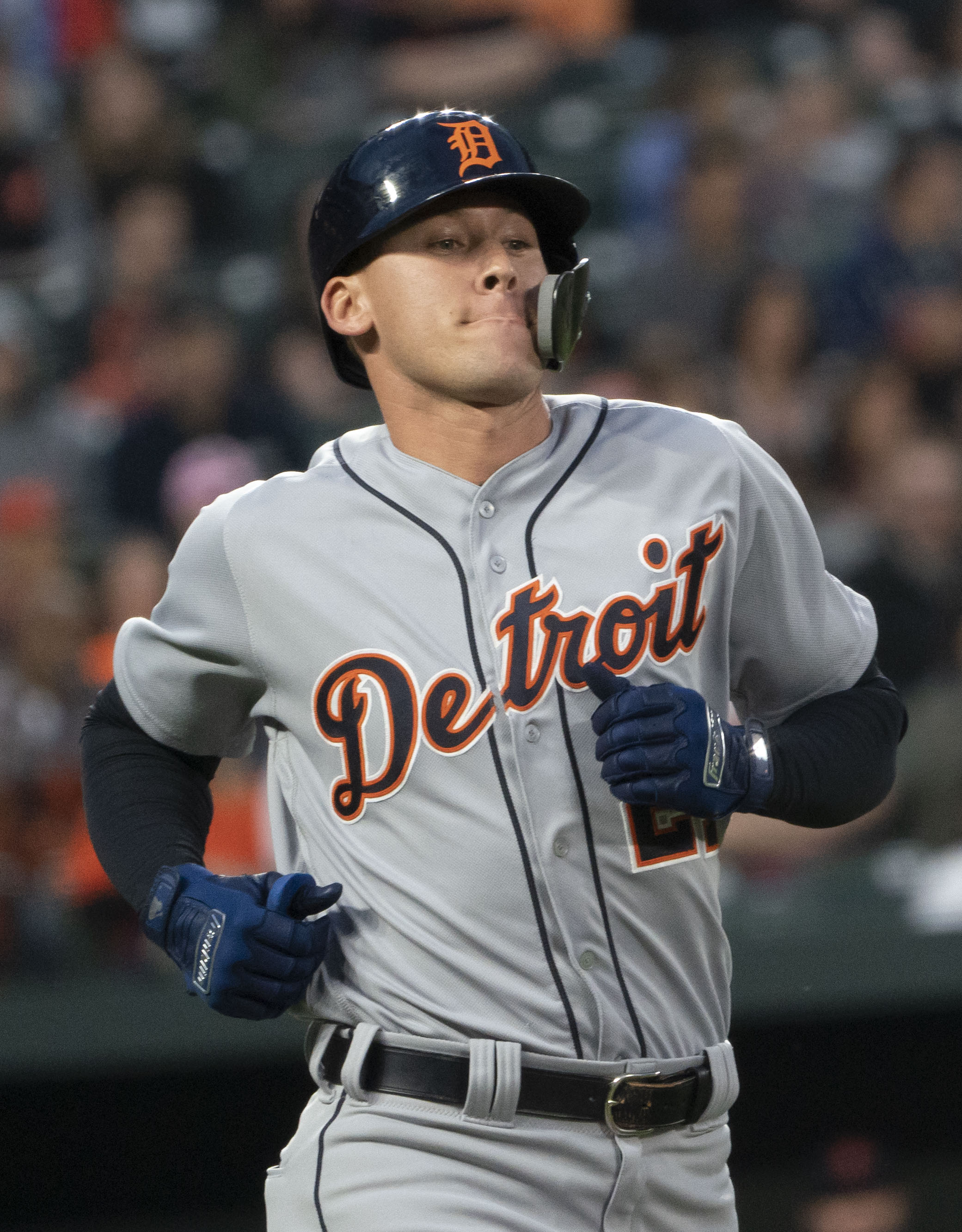
- Jones with the Detroit Tigers in 2018
- Center fielder
- Born: May 10, 1992 (age 34); Chickasha, Oklahoma, U.S.
- Batted: Right Threw: Right

MLB debut
- August 30, 2016, for the Detroit Tigers

Last MLB appearance
- May 23, 2021, for the Detroit Tigers

MLB statistics
- Batting average: .212
- Home runs: 32
- Runs batted in: 98
- Stats at Baseball Reference

Teams
- Detroit Tigers (2016–2021)

JaCoby Mylon Jones (born May 10, 1992) is an American former professional baseball center fielder. He played in Major League Baseball (MLB) for the Detroit Tigers from 2016 to 2021. Prior to playing professionally, Jones attended Louisiana State University (LSU) and played college baseball for the LSU Tigers.

== Amateur career ==
Jones grew up in Richton, Mississippi. He attended Richton High School, where he starred for his school's baseball team. In 2009, he was an Aflac All American and an Under Armour All American. During his senior year in 2010, he was named Mississippi High School Player of the Year. He was also named the Louisville Slugger Mississippi Player of the Year. Jones was also a 2nd Team All American in 2010. Jones is the all-time career hit leader in the state of Mississippi. Jones was a four time All-state selection in high school and was also a 1st Team All-District. He was a Wendy’s High School Heisman in Mississippi recipient. Jones was then drafted in the 19th round of the 2010 MLB draft straight out of high school, but chose to go to LSU. He then enrolled at Louisiana State University (LSU), and played college baseball for the LSU Tigers baseball team as a second baseman. As a freshman with the Tigers, Jones had a .338 batting average, four home runs and 32 runs batted in. He was named to the All-Southeastern Conference (SEC)'s freshman team and a freshman All-American.

As a sophomore, the Tigers tried to play Jones in center field, but moved him back to second base. He batted .252 on the season. In 2012, he played collegiate summer baseball with the Harwich Mariners of the Cape Cod Baseball League, where he was champion of the Home Run Derby. As a junior, Jones batted .294 with six home runs in 59 games, and was named to the All-SEC second team.

== Professional career ==
=== Pittsburgh Pirates ===
The Pittsburgh Pirates selected Jones in the third round of the 2013 MLB draft as an outfielder. He signed with Pittsburgh and reported to the Jamestown Jammers of the Low–A New York–Penn League. After playing 15 games for Jamestown, he suffered a knee injury that ended his season. He began the 2014 season with the West Virginia Power of the Single–A South Atlantic League as a shortstop. He hit 23 home runs for West Virginia. He began the 2015 season with the Bradenton Marauders of the High–A Florida State League. The Pirates promoted him to the Altoona Curve of the Double–A Eastern League in July.

=== Detroit Tigers ===
==== 2015–2018 ====
On July 30, 2015, the Pirates traded Jones to the Detroit Tigers in exchange for Joakim Soria. He was assigned to the Erie SeaWolves of the Eastern League. In his third game with the SeaWolves, Jones went three-for-four with three home runs and five RBIs. He finished with a .250 average, six home runs and 20 RBIs in 37 games for the SeaWolves.

Following the 2015 season, Jones went on to play for the Scottsdale Scorpions of the Arizona Fall League (AFL). Jones was named the AFL Co-Player of the Week for the week ending October 20, and was named to the AFL's Fall Stars Game. On November 5, 2015, while playing in the AFL, Jones was suspended 50 games for his second violation of MLB's joint drug prevention and treatment program.

Jones began the 2016 season with the Toledo Mud Hens of the Triple–A International League. The Tigers promoted Jones to the major leagues on August 30, 2016. In his first two games, he hit 4 for 8, including three doubles. His first major league hit on August 30 was an RBI double against the Chicago White Sox, and on August 31, he scored the game-winning run in the bottom of the ninth inning on a shallow sacrifice fly.

Jones again participated in the Arizona Fall League in 2016, playing mostly center field for the Scottsdale Scorpions in hopes of becoming the Tigers everyday center fielder in 2017.

During a Spring Training broadcast on March 26, 2017, Tiger great Al Kaline described Jones as "the best outfielder we have...(as a) runner, thrower, getting a jump on the ball." On March 31, Jones was named as the Tigers opening day center fielder by manager Brad Ausmus.

Jones hit his first career Major League home run in his first at-bat of the season on April 4, 2017, a three-run shot against José Quintana of the Chicago White Sox. Jones became the first Tigers rookie to hit a home run on opening day since Kirk Gibson in 1980, and the first Tiger to record his first Major League home run on opening day since John Sullivan in 1965.

On April 22, 2017, Jones was hit in the face by a pitch from Justin Haley. With blood coming from Jones' lips, he left the game. Later tests revealed no structural damage to his jaw or teeth, but he did receive stitches on the outside and inside of his lower lip. Jones was placed on the 10-day disabled list the next day. After the DL stint, Jones was assigned to Triple-A Toledo. He was recalled to the Tigers on August 18. Jones had two home runs in a September 5 game against the Kansas City Royals.

==== 2018–2021 ====
Jones made the Tigers' 2018 opening day roster as an outfielder. On April 20, he hit a walk-off home run in the bottom of the tenth inning to win a game against the Kansas City Royals. On August 13, Jones was placed on the 10-day disabled list after suffering a strained right hamstring. While struggling at the plate in 2018 with a .207 batting average and 11 home runs, Jones was superb on defense. His Defensive Runs Saved rating of 24 (meaning 24 better than league average) was among the major league leaders for outfielders, and he finished second to Mookie Betts in Ultimate zone rating.

Jones started the 2019 season on the 10-day injured list, after sustaining a left shoulder sprain running into an outfield wall in a March 23 spring training game. He was recalled on April 11, and made his 2019 debut with the Tigers that afternoon against the Cleveland Indians. Jones ended up back on the IL on July 4 with a lower back strain. Jones returned from the IL on July 19. On August 8 Jones had to come out of the game after being hit on the wrist by a pitch; he was initially diagnosed with a wrist contusion when X-rays came back negative. On August 10 a CT scan revealed that Jones had suffered a fractured wrist and would be out 6 weeks, likely ending his season. He finished the season playing in 88 games, hitting .235 with 11 home runs.

On January 10, 2020, the Tigers avoided arbitration with Jones, agreeing on a one-year, $1.575 million contract. On August 10, 2020, Jones hit his first career inside-the-park home run against the Chicago White Sox. On September 1, Jones suffered a fractured left hand after being hit by a pitch, ending his season. Overall with the 2020 Detroit Tigers, Jones batted .268 with five home runs and 14 RBIs in 30 games.

On January 15, 2021, the Tigers and Jones agreed to a one-year, $2.65 million contract, avoiding arbitration. After hitting .170 in his first 100 at-bats, Jones was optioned to Triple-A Toledo on May 23. Jones was later designated for assignment on June 6. He was outrighted to the Triple-A Toledo Mud Hens on June 10. He continued to struggle offensively with Toledo, hitting .230 with 103 strikeouts in 301 plate appearances.

On October 6, 2021, Jones elected free agency.

=== Kansas City Royals ===
On December 1, 2021, Jones signed a minor league contract with the Kansas City Royals. Jones played in 38 games for the Triple-A Omaha Storm Chasers, hitting .214 with 4 home runs and 13 RBI. On June 15, 2022, Jones was released by the Royals.
