= 2018 Detroit Tigers season =

Major League Baseball season

2018 Detroit Tigers
- League: American League
- Division: Central
- Ballpark: Comerica Park
- City: Detroit, Michigan
- Record: 64–98 (.395)
- Divisional place: 3rd
- Owners: Christopher Ilitch; Ilitch family trust
- General managers: Al Avila
- Managers: Ron Gardenhire
- Television: Fox Sports Detroit (Mario Impemba, Matt Shepard, Rod Allen, Kirk Gibson)
- Radio: Detroit Tigers Radio Network (Dan Dickerson, Jim Price)
- Stats: ESPN.com; Baseball Reference

The 2018 Detroit Tigers season was the team's 118th season. It was the team's first year under a mostly new coaching staff led by new Manager Ron Gardenhire. It was the fourth consecutive season they missed the playoffs, finishing with the same record as the previous season, 64–98, but good for third place in the American League Central division.

It was the last season for television announcers Mario Impemba and Rod Allen, who had been together since 2003. Their contracts were not renewed due to an alleged physical altercation after the game on September 4.

== Uniform changes ==
Starting this season, the Tigers changed the classic curved Old English D logo on their home uniforms to match that of the sharp cornered hat logo, which is now larger.

== Roster moves ==
=== Coaching staff ===
- On October 20, the Tigers announced Ron Gardenhire was named the successor to Brad Ausmus as the Tigers' manager, and signed to a three-year contract.
- On November 2, the Tigers named Chris Bosio as pitching coach, Ramón Santiago as first-base coach, Phil Clark as assistant hitting coach, Rick Anderson as bullpen coach, Steve Liddle as bench coach, and Joe Vavra as quality control coach. Also on November 2, the Tigers announced Lloyd McClendon would return as hitting coach and Dave Clark would return as third-base coach.
- On June 27, 2018, the Tigers terminated pitching coach Chris Bosio's contract due to "insensitive comments that violated Club policy and his Uniform Employee Contract." Bullpen coach Rick Anderson was then promoted to pitching coach.

=== Releases ===
- On November 2, utility player Andrew Romine was claimed off waivers by the Seattle Mariners. Also on November 2, the Tigers announced they declined the team option on pitcher Aníbal Sánchez, making him a free agent. On March 16, Sánchez signed a minor-league contract with the Atlanta Braves.
- On December 1, the Tigers announced they would not tender a contract to relief pitcher Bruce Rondón, making him a free agent. On February 1, Rondón signed a minor-league contract with the Chicago White Sox.
- On December 28, free agent pitcher Kyle Ryan left the Tigers and signed a minor league contract with the Chicago Cubs.
- On May 15, pitcher Chad Bell was claimed off waivers by the Atlanta Braves.
- On May 22, the Tigers released pitcher Jairo Labourt. On May 29, Labourt signed a minor-league contract with the Chicago White Sox.

=== Signings ===
- On November 25, the Tigers agreed to a one-year, $795,000 deal with relief pitcher Blaine Hardy, avoiding arbitration.
- On December 5, the Tigers signed outfielder Leonys Martín to a one-year, $1.75 million contract.
- On December 8, the Tigers signed pitcher Mike Fiers to a one-year, $6 million contract.
- On December 14, the Tigers selected outfielder Víctor Reyes in the Rule 5 draft.
- On January 9, the Tigers signed catcher Brayan Peña to a minor league contract. Peña retired as a player on June 18, 2018, and went on to manage the Tigers' rookie league team in the Gulf Coast League.
- On January 11, the Tigers claimed pitcher Johnny Barbato off waivers from the Pittsburgh Pirates. Also on January 11, the Tigers signed catcher James McCann to a one-year, $2.375 million contract, avoiding arbitration.
- On January 17, the Tigers avoided arbitration when they reached one-year deals with right fielder Nicholas Castellanos, shortstop José Iglesias, and pitchers Shane Greene and Alex Wilson.
- On February 23, the Tigers signed pitcher Francisco Liriano to a one-year, $4 million contract.
- On August 10, the Tigers signed relief pitcher Zach McAllister to a major league contract. He pitched in just three games for the Tigers before being designated for assignment and electing free agency on August 22.

=== Trades ===
- On December 13, the Tigers traded second baseman Ian Kinsler to the Los Angeles Angels in exchange for 18-year old pitching prospect Wilkel Hernandez and minor league outfielder Troy Montgomery.
- On July 31, the Tigers traded outfielder Leonys Martín and pitching prospect Kyle Dowdy to the Cleveland Indians in exchange for shortstop Willi Castro.
- On August 6, the Tigers traded pitcher Mike Fiers to the Oakland Athletics in exchange for two players to be named later or cash considerations. On August 18, the Athletics sent pitcher Nolan Blackwood to the Tigers as one of the players to be named later. On September 19, 2018, the Athletics sent pitcher Logan Shore to the Tigers to complete the trade.

== Number retirements ==
- The Tigers retired Jack Morris' #47 on August 12 and Alan Trammell's #3 on August 26, both members of the 1984 World Champion team. They were inducted into the National Baseball Hall of Fame on the weekend of July 27–29.

== Season standings ==
=== American League Central ===
AL Central
Team	W	L	Pct.	GB	Home	Road
Cleveland Indians	91	71	.562	—	49‍–‍32	42‍–‍39
Minnesota Twins	78	84	.481	13	49‍–‍32	29‍–‍52
Detroit Tigers	64	98	.395	27	38‍–‍43	26‍–‍55
Chicago White Sox	62	100	.383	29	30‍–‍51	32‍–‍49
Kansas City Royals	58	104	.358	33	32‍–‍49	26‍–‍55

=== American League Wild Card ===
Division leaders
Team	W	L	Pct.
Boston Red Sox	108	54	.667
Houston Astros	103	59	.636
Cleveland Indians	91	71	.562

Wild Card teams (Top 2 teams qualify for postseason)
Team	W	L	Pct.	GB
New York Yankees	100	62	.617	+3
Oakland Athletics	97	65	.599	—
Tampa Bay Rays	90	72	.556	7
Seattle Mariners	89	73	.549	8
Los Angeles Angels	80	82	.494	17
Minnesota Twins	78	84	.481	19
Toronto Blue Jays	73	89	.451	24
Texas Rangers	67	95	.414	30
Detroit Tigers	64	98	.395	33
Chicago White Sox	62	100	.383	35
Kansas City Royals	58	104	.358	39
Baltimore Orioles	47	115	.290	50

=== Record against opponents ===
2018 American League record Source: MLB Standings Grid – 2018
Team	BAL	BOS	CWS	CLE	DET	HOU	KC	LAA	MIN	NYY	OAK	SEA	TB	TEX	TOR	NL
Baltimore	—	3–16	3–4	2–5	2–4	1–6	2–4	1–5	1–6	7–12	1–5	1–6	8–11	3–4	5–14	7–13
Boston	16–3	—	3–4	3–4	4–2	3–4	5–1	6–0	4–3	10–9	2–4	4–3	11–8	6–1	15–4	16–4
Chicago	4–3	4–3	—	5–14	7–12	0–7	11–8	2–5	7–12	2–4	2–5	2–4	4–2	4–3	2–4	6–14
Cleveland	5–2	4–3	14–5	—	13–6	3–4	12–7	3–3	10–9	2–5	2–4	2–5	2–4	4–2	3–4	12–8
Detroit	4–2	2–4	12–7	6–13	—	1–5	8–11	3–4	7–12	3–4	0–7	3–4	2–4	3–4	4–3	6–14
Houston	6–1	4–3	7–0	4–3	5–1	—	5–1	13–6	4–2	2–5	12–7	9–10	3–4	12–7	4–2	13–7
Kansas City	4–2	1–5	8–11	7–12	11–8	1–5	—	1–6	10–9	2–5	2–5	1–5	0–7	2–5	2–5	6–14
Los Angeles	5–1	0–6	5–2	3–3	4–3	6–13	6–1	—	4–3	1–5	10–9	8–11	1–6	13–6	4–3	10–10
Minnesota	6–1	3–4	12–7	9–10	12–7	2–4	9–10	3–4	—	2–5	2–5	1–5	3–4	2–4	4–2	8–12
New York	12–7	9–10	4–2	5–2	4–3	5–2	5–2	5–1	5–2	—	3–3	5–1	10–9	4–3	13–6	11–9
Oakland	5–1	4–2	5–2	4–2	7–0	7–12	5–2	9–10	5–2	3–3	—	9–10	2–5	13–6	7–0	12–8
Seattle	6–1	3–4	4–2	5–2	4–3	10–9	5–1	11–8	5–1	1–5	10–9	—	6–1	10–9	3–4	6–14
Tampa Bay	11–8	8–11	2–4	4–2	4–2	4–3	7–0	6–1	4–3	9–10	5–2	1–6	—	5–1	13–6	7–13
Texas	4–3	1–6	3–4	2–4	4–3	7–12	5–2	6–13	4–2	3–4	6–13	9–10	1–5	—	3–3	9–11
Toronto	14–5	4–15	4–2	4–3	3–4	2–4	5–2	3–4	2–4	6–13	0–7	4–3	6–13	3–3	—	13–7

== Season highlights ==
=== Team accomplishments ===
- On April 8, the Tigers won a game with two or fewer hits for the first time since July 11, 2004 against the Minnesota Twins.
- On May 28, the Tigers established a franchise record by hitting at least one double in 44 consecutive games, breaking the previous team record set in 1924. JaCoby Jones hit the record-breaking double in the fourth inning against the Los Angeles Angels. The streak was extended to 53 consecutive games before ending on June 6 against the Boston Red Sox. This was the third-longest streak in Major League history since at least 1908.
- On July 15, the Tigers faced starter Justin Verlander for the first time since he was traded to the Houston Astros from the Tigers on August 31, 2017. Detroit won the game 6–3, while tagging Verlander for four home runs. It was only the third time in Verlander's career that he gave up four home runs in a game.

=== Individual accomplishments ===
==== Pitching ====
- On April 21 against the Kansas City Royals, Mike Fiers became just the second Tigers player since 1908 to give up 10 or more hits in fewer than six innings, strike out nobody and earn a victory, and the first Tigers player to do since Dan Petry in 1984.
- On April 22 against the Kansas City Royals, Francisco Liriano took a no-hitter into the sixth inning, before a home run by Whit Merrifield ruined the no-hit bid.
- On May 20 against the Seattle Mariners, Francisco Liriano took a no-hitter into the seventh inning, before a one-out single by Mitch Haniger ruined the no-hit bid.
- On August 3 against the Oakland Athletics, Blaine Hardy took a no-hitter into the seventh inning, before an infield single by Jed Lowrie ruined the no-hit bid.
- On August 31 against the New York Yankees, Jordan Zimmermann took a no-hitter into the sixth inning, before a two-run home run by Brett Gardner ruined the no-hit bid.
- On September 9 against the St. Louis Cardinals, Michael Fulmer took a perfect game into the sixth inning, before allowing a walk to Yairo Muñoz to start the inning.

==== Hitting ====
- On April 25, Jeimer Candelario fell a triple shy of the cycle, hitting a single, double, and home run, to help the Tigers defeat the Pittsburgh Pirates, 13–10.
- On August 13 against the Chicago White Sox, Nicholas Castellanos went 5-for-5 with 5 RBIs. He became the first Tigers player with five hits in a game since Ian Kinsler in 2015, and the first with 10 total bases in a game since Justin Upton in 2017.
- On September 20 against the Kansas City Royals, Christin Stewart hit his first two major league home runs in his first two at-bats, and had six RBIs in the game. It was the first time a Tiger player hit his first two major league home runs in the same game since Brent Clevlen in 2006, the first time a Tiger rookie had a six-RBI game since Ryan Raburn had a seven-RBI game in 2007, and the first time since 1908 that a Tiger player had a six-RBI game within his first 11 career contests.

==== Defense ====
- JaCoby Jones' Defensive Runs Saved rating of 24 (meaning 24 better than league average) was the best among all major league outfielders, and he finished second to Mookie Betts in Ultimate Zone Rating.

== Game log ==
2018 Game Log: 64–98 (Home: 38–43; Away: 26–55)
March/April: 11–16 (Home: 6–8; Away: 5–8)

#	Date	Opponent	Score	Win	Loss	Save	Attendance	Record	Streak
—	March 29	Pirates	Postponed (inclement weather). Rescheduled to March 30.						
1	March 30	Pirates	10–13 (13)	Brault (1–0)	**Wilson** (0–1)	—	42,516	0–1	L1
—	March 31	Pirates	Postponed (inclement weather). Rescheduled to April 1.						
2	April 1	Pirates	0–1	Williams (1–0)	**Fulmer** (0–1)	Rivero (1)	14,858	0–2	L2
3	April 1	Pirates	6–8	Kuhl (1–0)	**Farmer** (0–1)	Rivero (2)	18,438	0–3	L3
4	April 2	Royals	6–1	**Liriano** (1–0)	Hammel (0–1)	—	15,476	1–3	W1
5	April 3	Royals	0–1	Junis (1–0)	**Boyd** (0–1)	Herrera (1)	15,083	1–4	L1
—	April 4	Royals	Postponed (inclement weather). Rescheduled to April 20.						
6	April 5	@ White Sox	9–7 (10)	**Jiménez** (1–0)	Infante (0–1)	**Greene** (1)	33,318	2–4	W1
7	April 7	@ White Sox	6–1	**Fulmer** (1–1)	Giolito (0–1)	—	16,625	3–4	W2
8	April 8	@ White Sox	1–0	**Fiers** (1–0)	López (0–1)	**Greene** (2)	11,131	4–4	W3
9	April 9	@ Indians	0–2	Kluber (1–1)	**Liriano** (1–1)	Miller (1)	9,843	4–5	L1
10	April 10	@ Indians	1–2	Miller (1–0)	**Wilson** (0–2)	Allen (3)	10,078	4–6	L2
11	April 11	@ Indians	1–5	Carrasco (3–0)	**Norris** (0–1)	—	10,872	4–7	L3
12	April 12	@ Indians	3–9	Bauer (1–1)	**Fulmer** (1–2)	—	12,901	4–8	L4
13	April 13	Yankees	6–8	Montgomery (1–0)	**Fiers** (1–1)	Chapman (2)	21,363	4–9	L5
—	April 14	Yankees	Postponed (inclement weather). Rescheduled to April 15.						
—	April 15	Yankees	Postponed (inclement weather). Rescheduled to June 4.						
—	April 15	Yankees	Postponed (inclement weather). Rescheduled to June 4.						
14	April 17	Orioles	4–2	**Liriano** (2–1)	Cashner (1–2)	**Greene** (3)	15,530	5–9	W1
15	April 18	Orioles	6–5	**Greene** (1–0)	Araújo (1–2)	—	15,178	6–9	W2
16	April 19	Orioles	13–8	**Zimmermann** (1–0)	Cobb (0–2)	—	15,916	7–9	W3
17	April 20	Royals	3–2 (10)	**Jiménez** (2–0)	Keller (0–1)	—	15,406	8–9	W4
18	April 20	Royals	2–3	Junis (3–1)	**Greene** (1–1)	Herrera (3)	17,194	8–10	L1
19	April 21	Royals	12–4	**Fiers** (2–1)	Duffy (0–3)	**Saupold** (1)	19,302	9–10	W1
20	April 22	Royals	5–8	McCarthy (1–0)	**VerHagen** (0–1)	Herrera (4)	19,034	9–11	L1
—	April 24	@ Pirates	Postponed (inclement weather). Rescheduled to April 25.						
21	April 25	@ Pirates	13–10	**Stumpf** (1–0)	Taillon (2–2)	**Greene** (4)	9,396	10–11	W1
22	April 25	@ Pirates	3–8	Kuhl (3–1)	**Boyd** (0–2)	—	9,396	10–12	L1
23	April 26	@ Pirates	0–1	Vázquez (1–0)	**Wilson** (0–3)	—	12,049	10–13	L2
24	April 27	@ Orioles	0–6	Tillman (1–4)	**Fiers** (2–2)	—	14,223	10–14	L3
25	April 28	@ Orioles	9–5	**Liriano** (3–1)	Cashner (1–4)	—	20,896	11–14	W1
26	April 29	@ Orioles	3–5	Gausman (2–2)	**Norris** (0–2)	O'Day (2)	28,089	11–15	L1
27	April 30	Rays	2–3	Faria (2–1)	**Greene** (1–2)	Alvarado (1)	19,398	11–16	L2

May: 15–14 (Home: 11–4; Away: 4–10)

#	Date	Opponent	Score	Win	Loss	Save	Attendance	Record	Streak
28	May 1	Rays	2–1	**Boyd** (1–2)	Archer (2–2)	**Greene** (5)	17,255	12–16	W1
29	May 2	Rays	3–2 (12)	**Saupold** (1–0)	Andriese (0–1)	—	20,866	13–16	W2
30	May 3	@ Royals	6–10	McCarthy (3–0)	**Bell** (0–1)	—	28,866	13–17	L1
31	May 4	@ Royals	2–4	Boyer (1–0)	**Stumpf** (1–1)	Herrera (6)	24,648	13–18	L2
32	May 5	@ Royals	3–2	**Zimmermann** (2–0)	Hammel (0–4)	**Greene** (6)	20,708	14–18	W1
33	May 6	@ Royals	2–4	Junis (4–2)	**Boyd** (1–3)	Herrera (7)	18,424	14–19	L1
34	May 7	@ Rangers	6–7	Leclerc (1–0)	**Stumpf** (1–2)	Kela (7)	20,057	14–20	L2
35	May 8	@ Rangers	7–4	**Fiers** (3–2)	Minor (3–2)	**Greene** (7)	18,634	15–20	W1
36	May 9	@ Rangers	4–5 (10)	Kela (3–2)	**Saupold** (1–1)	—	30,387	15–21	L1
—	May 11	Mariners	Postponed (inclement weather). Rescheduled to May 12.						
37	May 12	Mariners	4–3	**Boyd** (2–3)	Gonzales (3–3)	**Greene** (8)	25,506	16–21	W1
38	May 12	Mariners	5–9	Hernández (5–3)	**Fulmer** (1–3)	—	25,506	16–22	L1
39	May 13	Mariners	5–4	**Greene** (2–2)	Nicasio (1–2)	—	24,718	17–22	W1
40	May 14	Indians	6–3	**Fiers** (4–2)	Carrasco (5–2)	—	17,775	18–22	W2
41	May 15	Indians	9–8	**Coleman** (1–0)	Miller (1–2)	**Greene** (9)	20,997	19–22	W3
42	May 16	Indians	0–6	Bauer (3–3)	**Carpenter** (0–1)	—	24,771	19–23	L1
43	May 17	@ Mariners	3–2	**Saupold** (2–1)	Vincent (1–1)	**Greene** (10)	15,169	20–23	W1
44	May 18	@ Mariners	4–5	Altavilla (3–2)	**Farmer** (0–2)	Díaz (15)	34,932	20–24	L1
45	May 19	@ Mariners	2–7	Paxton (3–1)	**Fiers** (4–3)	—	35,739	20–25	L2
46	May 20	@ Mariners	2–3 (11)	Vincent (2–1)	**Farmer** (0–3)	—	34,252	20–26	L3
47	May 21	@ Twins	2–4	Berríos (5–4)	**Stumpf** (1–3)	Rodney (10)	17,161	20–27	L4
48	May 22	@ Twins	0–6	Lynn (2–4)	**Boyd** (2–4)	—	25,559	20–28	L5
49	May 23	@ Twins	4–1	**Fulmer** (2–3)	Gibson (1–3)	**Greene** (11)	23,891	21–28	W1
50	May 25	White Sox	5–4	**Farmer** (1–3)	Rondón (2–3)	**Greene** (12)	24,648	22–28	W2
51	May 26	White Sox	4–8	Santiago (1–2)	**Liriano** (3–2)	—	27,032	22–29	L1
52	May 27	White Sox	3–2	**Hardy** (1–0)	Shields (1–5)	**Greene** (13)	23,419	23–29	W1
53	May 28	Angels	9–3	**Boyd** (3–4)	Skaggs (3–4)	—	20,857	24–29	W2
54	May 29	Angels	2–9	Tropeano (3–3)	**Fulmer** (2–4)	—	17,397	24–30	L1
55	May 30	Angels	6–1	**Coleman** (2–0)	Bedrosian (1–1)	—	19,494	25–30	W1
56	May 31	Angels	6–2	**Saupold** (3–1)	Heaney (2–4)	—	24,696	26–30	W2

June: 10–18 (Home: 6–9; Away: 4–9)

#	Date	Opponent	Score	Win	Loss	Save	Attendance	Record	Streak
57	June 1	Blue Jays	5–2	**Hardy** (2–0)	García (2–4)	**Greene** (14)	22,192	27–30	W3
58	June 2	Blue Jays	7–4	**Coleman** (3–0)	Oh (1–1)	**Jiménez** (1)	34,674	28–30	W4
59	June 3	Blue Jays	4–8	Sanchez (3–5)	**Fulmer** (2–5)	—	24,658	28–31	L1
60	June 4	Yankees	4–7	Severino (9–1)	**VerHagen** (0–2)	Chapman (14)	28,016	28–32	L2
61	June 4	Yankees	4–2	**Fiers** (5–3)	Germán (0–4)	**Greene** (15)	24,165	29–32	W1
62	June 5	@ Red Sox	0–6	Wright (2–0)	**Lewicki** (0–1)	—	34,762	29–33	L1
63	June 6	@ Red Sox	1–7	Rodríguez (7–1)	**Hardy** (2–1)	—	35,182	29–34	L2
64	June 7	@ Red Sox	7–2	**Boyd** (4–4)	Beeks (0–1)	—	36,556	30–34	W1
65	June 8	Indians	1–4	Bauer (5–4)	**Greene** (2–3)	Allen (12)	21,766	30–35	L1
66	June 9	Indians	4–2 (12)	**Saupold** (4–1)	Allen (2–3)	—	27,038	31–35	W1
67	June 10	Indians	2–9	Kluber (10–2)	**Lewicki** (0–2)	—	22,862	31–36	L1
68	June 12	Twins	4–6	Pressly (1–1)	**Coleman** (3–1)	Rodney (14)	20,340	31–37	L2
69	June 13	Twins	5–2	**Jiménez** (3–0)	Reed (1–5)	**Greene** (16)	19,206	32–37	W1
70	June 14	Twins	3–1	**Fulmer** (3–5)	Lynn (4–5)	**Greene** (17)	27,573	33–37	W2
71	June 15	@ White Sox	4–3	**Farmer** (2–3)	Minaya (0–1)	**Greene** (18)	22,813	34–37	W3
72	June 16	@ White Sox	7–5	**Farmer** (3–3)	Fry (0–1)	**Greene** (19)	23,195	35–37	W4
73	June 17	@ White Sox	3–1	**Hardy** (3–1)	Shields (2–8)	**Jiménez** (2)	26,746	36–37	W5
74	June 19	@ Reds	5–9	Romano (4–7)	**Boyd** (4–5)	—	31,085	36–38	L1
75	June 20	@ Reds	3–5	Mahle (6–6)	**Fulmer** (3–6)	Iglesias (11)	19,177	36–39	L2
76	June 22	@ Indians	0–10	Bieber (2–0)	**Fiers** (5–4)	—	30,926	36–40	L3
77	June 23	@ Indians	1–4	Bauer (7–5)	**Liriano** (3–3)	Allen (16)	34,435	36–41	L4
78	June 24	@ Indians	2–12	Plutko (4–1)	**Boyd** (4–6)	—	31,208	36–42	L5
79	June 25	Athletics	4–5	Trivino (6–1)	**Greene** (2–4)	Treinen (18)	19,127	36–43	L6
80	June 26	Athletics	7–9	Buchter (2–0)	**Greene** (2–5)	Treinen (19)	22,809	36–44	L7
81	June 27	Athletics	0–3	Bassitt (1–3)	**Fiers** (5–5)	Trivino (2)	23,961	36–45	L8
82	June 28	Athletics	2–4	Manaea (8–6)	**Fulmer** (3–7)	Treinen (20)	28,866	36–46	L9
83	June 29	@ Blue Jays	2–3	Stroman (1–5)	**Liriano** (3–4)	Clippard (5)	24,068	36–47	L10
84	June 30	@ Blue Jays	3–4	Oh (4–2)	**Jiménez** (3–1)	—	27,066	36–48	L11

July: 10–14 (Home: 5–6; Away: 5–8)

#	Date	Opponent	Score	Win	Loss	Save	Attendance	Record	Streak
85	July 1	@ Blue Jays	9–1	**Zimmermann** (3–0)	Happ (10–4)	—	37,445	37–48	W1
86	July 2	@ Blue Jays	3–2 (10)	**Jiménez** (4–1)	Oh (4–3)	**Hardy** (1)	29,575	38–48	W2
87	July 3	@ Cubs	3–5	Wilson (3–2)	**Stumpf** (1–4)	Strop (2)	38,424	38–49	L1
88	July 4	@ Cubs	2–5	Quintana (7–6)	**Liriano** (3–5)	Morrow (19)	40,510	38–50	L2
89	July 5	Rangers	5–7	Gallardo (3–0)	**Boyd** (4–7)	Kela (21)	21,248	38–51	L3
90	July 6	Rangers	3–1	**Zimmermann** (4–0)	Colón (5–6)	**Jiménez** (3)	27,316	39–51	W1
91	July 7	Rangers	7–2	**Fiers** (6–5)	Hamels (4–8)	—	29,174	40–51	W2
92	July 8	Rangers	0–3	Bibens-Dirkx (2–2)	**Fulmer** (3–8)	Kela (22)	22,047	40–52	L1
93	July 9	@ Rays	9–10 (10)	Andriese (2–3)	**Hardy** (3–2)	—	14,229	40–53	L2
94	July 10	@ Rays	2–5	Alvarado (1–3)	**Boyd** (4–8)	Romo (10)	13,478	40–54	L3
95	July 11	@ Rays	2–4	Yarbrough (8–4)	**Zimmermann** (4–1)	Romo (11)	13,922	40–55	L4
96	July 13	@ Astros	0–3	Keuchel (7–8)	**Fiers** (6–6)	Rondón (8)	38,843	40–56	L5
97	July 14	@ Astros	1–9	Cole (10–2)	**Fulmer** (3–9)	—	40,405	40–57	L6
98	July 15	@ Astros	6–3	**VerHagen** (1–2)	Verlander (9–5)	—	39,455	41–57	W1
**2018 Major League Baseball All-Star Game**
99	July 20	Red Sox	0–1	Price (11–6)	**Boyd** (4–9)	Kimbrel (31)	33,817	41–58	L1
100	July 21	Red Sox	5–0	**Fiers** (7–6)	Johnson (1–3)	—	31,682	42–58	W1
101	July 22	Red Sox	1–9	Sale (11–4)	**Hardy** (3–3)	—	25,012	42–59	L1
102	July 23	@ Royals	5–4	**Wilson** (1–3)	Maurer (0–4)	**Greene** (20)	18,370	43–59	W1
103	July 24	@ Royals	4–5	Smith (1–1)	**Zimmermann** (4–2)	Peralta (5)	29,957	43–60	L1
104	July 25	@ Royals	8–4	**Boyd** (5–9)	Duffy (6–9)	—	17,382	44–60	W1
105	July 27	Indians	3–8	Allen (3–4)	**Jiménez** (4–2)	—	26,962	44–61	L1
106	July 28	Indians	2–1	**Hardy** (4–3)	Clevinger (7–7)	**Greene** (21)	29,097	45–61	W1
107	July 29	Indians	1–8	Kluber (13–6)	**Zimmermann** (4–3)	—	26,498	45–62	L1
108	July 31	Reds	2–1	**Boyd** (6–9)	Bailey (1–8)	**Greene** (22)	24,929	46–62	W1

August: 8–19 (Home: 6–7; Away: 2–12)

#	Date	Opponent	Score	Win	Loss	Save	Attendance	Record	Streak
109	August 1	Reds	7–4	**VerHagen** (2–2)	Romano (6–9)	**Greene** (23)	24,952	47–62	W2
110	August 3	@ Athletics	0–1 (13)	Pagan (3–0)	**Farmer** (3–4)	—	14,766	47–63	L1
111	August 4	@ Athletics	1–2	Jackson (3–2)	**Zimmermann** (4–4)	Treinen (28)	33,668	47–64	L2
112	August 5	@ Athletics	0–6	Cahill (4–2)	**Liriano** (3–6)	—	19,559	47–65	L3
113	August 6	@ Angels	2–6	Tropeano (5–6)	**Boyd** (6–10)	—	34,073	47–66	L4
114	August 7	@ Angels	5–11	Heaney (7–7)	**Turner** (0–1)	—	35,824	47–67	L5
115	August 8	@ Angels	0–6	Barría (7–7)	**Hardy** (4–4)	—	38,832	47–68	L6
116	August 10	Twins	5–3	**Zimmermann** (5–4)	Santana (0–1)	**Greene** (24)	24,849	48–68	W1
117	August 11	Twins	3–4	Gibson (6–9)	**Liriano** (3–7)	Hildenberger (1)	26,991	48–69	L1
118	August 12	Twins	4–2	**Boyd** (7–10)	Stewart (0–1)	**Greene** (25)	30,105	49–69	W1
119	August 13	White Sox	9–5	**Coleman** (4–1)	Gómez (0–1)	—	20,964	50–69	W2
120	August 14	White Sox	3–6	Giolito (8–9)	**Hardy** (4–5)	Cedeño (1)	20,661	50–70	L1
121	August 15	White Sox	5–6	Rodón (4–3)	**Zimmermann** (5–5)	Avilán (2)	23,784	50–71	L2
122	August 16	@ Twins	8–15	May (1–0)	**Liriano** (3–8)	—	25,108	50–72	L3
123	August 17	@ Twins	4–5	Gibson (7–9)	**Boyd** (7–11)	Rogers (1)	26,605	50–73	L4
124	August 18	@ Twins	7–5	**Carpenter** (1–1)	Duffey (1–2)	**Greene** (26)	31,904	51–73	W1
125	August 19	@ Twins	4–5	Hildenberger (3–3)	**Wilson** (1–4)	—	27,917	51–74	L1
126	August 21	Cubs	2–1	**Zimmermann** (6–5)	Hendricks (9–10)	**Greene** (27)	26,638	52–74	W1
127	August 22	Cubs	2–8	Lester (14–5)	**Liriano** (3–9)	—	28,286	52–75	L1
128	August 23	White Sox	7–2	**Boyd** (8–11)	Shields (5–15)	—	22,247	53–75	W1
129	August 24	White Sox	3–6	Vieira (1–0)	**Jiménez** (4–3)	—	23,191	53–76	L1
130	August 25	White Sox	1–6	Giolito (10–9)	**Carpenter** (1–2)	—	26,183	53–77	L2
131	August 26	White Sox	2–7	Kopech (1–0)	**Zimmermann** (6–6)	Fry (3)	34,036	53–78	L3
132	August 28	@ Royals	2–6	Junis (7–12)	**Boyd** (8–12)	—	16,888	53–79	L4
133	August 29	@ Royals	2–9	Duffy (8–11)	**Fulmer** (3–10)	—	17,091	53–80	L5
134	August 30	@ Yankees	8–7	**Wilson** (2–4)	Betances (4–4)	**Greene** (28)	37,195	54–80	W1
135	August 31	@ Yankees	5–7	Britton (2–0)	**Jiménez** (4–4)	Robertson (5)	41,026	54–81	L1

September: 10–17 (Home: 4–9; Away: 6–8)

#	Date	Opponent	Score	Win	Loss	Save	Attendance	Record	Streak
136	September 1	@ Yankees	1–2	Tanaka (10–5)	**Norris** (0–3)	Betances (2)	42,816	54–82	L2
137	September 2	@ Yankees	11–7	**Boyd** (9–12)	Lynn (8–10)	—	43,721	55–82	W1
138	September 3	@ White Sox	2–4	Fry (2–2)	**Greene** (2–6)	—	15,540	55–83	L1
139	September 4	@ White Sox	8–3	**Liriano** (4–9)	Giolito (10–10)	—	13,012	56–83	W1
140	September 5	@ White Sox	10–2	**Zimmermann** (7–6)	Kopech (1–1)	—	16,036	57–83	W2
141	September 7	Cardinals	5–3	**Greene** (3–6)	Hicks (3–4)	—	21,268	58–83	W3
142	September 8	Cardinals	4–3	**Greene** (4–6)	Norris (3–5)	—	30,268	59–83	W4
143	September 9	Cardinals	2–5	Gant (7–5)	**Fulmer** (3–11)	Martínez (2)	22,212	59–84	L1
144	September 10	Astros	2–3	Verlander (15–9)	**Liriano** (4–10)	Osuna (16)	19,711	59–85	L2
145	September 11	Astros	4–5	Harris (4–3)	**Zimmermann** (7–7)	Osuna (17)	19,432	59–86	L3
146	September 12	Astros	4–5	Cole (14–5)	**Norris** (0–4)	Pressly (1)	22,666	59–87	L4
147	September 14	@ Indians	5–4	**VerHagen** (3–2)	Cimber (3–7)	**Greene** (29)	26,952	60–87	W1
148	September 15	@ Indians	0–15	Clevinger (12–8)	**Fulmer** (3–12)	—	26,532	60–88	L1
149	September 16	@ Indians	6–4	**Liriano** (5–10)	Bieber (10–4)	**Greene** (30)	24,862	61–88	W1
150	September 17	Twins	1–6	Stewart (2–1)	**Zimmermann** (7–8)	—	19,004	61–89	L1
151	September 18	Twins	3–5	Odorizzi (7–10)	**Norris** (0–5)	Hildenberger (7)	19,740	61–90	L2
152	September 19	Twins	2–8	Gonsalves (1–2)	**Turnbull** (0–1)	—	19,296	61–91	L3
153	September 20	Royals	11–8	**Reininger** (1–0)	López (2–4)	—	20,282	62–91	W1
154	September 21	Royals	3–4	Kennedy (3–8)	**Liriano** (5–11)	Peralta (12)	22,001	62–92	L1
155	September 22	Royals	5–4	**Jiménez** (5–4)	Hammel (3–14)	**Greene** (31)	24,815	63–92	W1
156	September 23	Royals	2–3	Keller (9–6)	**VerHagen** (3–3)	Peralta (13)	24,230	63–93	L1
157	September 25	@ Twins	4–2	**Alcántara** (1–0)	Hildenberger (4–6)	**Greene** (32)	23,849	64–93	W1
158	September 26	@ Twins	4–11	Duffey (2–2)	**Boyd** (9–13)	—	21,316	64–94	L1
159	September 27	@ Twins	3–9	Gonsalves (2–2)	**Liriano** (5–12)	—	22,342	64–95	L2
160	September 28	@ Brewers	5–6	Soria (2–1)	**Alcántara** (1–1)	Jeffress (14)	44,770	64–96	L3
161	September 29	@ Brewers	5–6	Soria (3–1)	**Stumpf** (1–5)	Jeffress (15)	45,520	64–97	L4
162	September 30	@ Brewers	0–11	González (10–11)	**Turnbull** (0–2)	—	41,848	64–98	L5

Legend: = Win = Loss = Postponement
Bold = Tigers team member

== Roster ==
2018 Detroit Tigers
Roster
Pitchers: 58 Victor Alcántara; 62 Sandy Báez; 51 Johnny Barbato; 64 Chad Bell; 48 Matthew Boyd; 31 Ryan Carpenter; 19 Louis Coleman; 45 Buck Farmer; 50 Mike Fiers; 32 Michael Fulmer; 61 Shane Greene; 64 Matt Hall; 36 Blaine Hardy; 77 Joe Jiménez; 57 Artie Lewicki; 38 Francisco Liriano; 29 Zach McAllister; 44 Daniel Norris; 26 Zac Reininger; 53 Warwick Saupold; 29,58 Josh Smoker; 68 Daniel Stumpf; 56 Spencer Turnbull; 50 Jacob Turner; 54 Drew VerHagen; 30 Alex Wilson; 27 Jordan Zimmermann	Catchers: 17 Grayson Greiner; 34 James McCann; Infielders: 37 Jim Adduci; 24 Miguel Cabrera; 46 Jeimer Candelario; 70 Harold Castro; 28 Niko Goodrum; 55 John Hicks; 1 José Iglesias; 33 Pete Kozma; 18 Dawel Lugo; 49 Dixon Machado; 41 Víctor Martínez; 60 Ronny Rodríguez; 12 Jarrod Saltalamacchia; Outfielders: 9 Nicholas Castellanos; 13 Mike Gerber; 21 JaCoby Jones; 8 Mikie Mahtook; 12 Leonys Martín; 22 Víctor Reyes; 14 Christin Stewart	Manager: 15 Ron Gardenhire; Coaches: 4 Rick Anderson (bullpen, pitching) (BUP: BOS-June 26, PC: June 27-); 29 Chris Bosio (pitching) (BOS-June 26); 25 Dave Clark (third base); 59 Phil Clark (assistant hitting); 43 Steve Liddle (bench); 20 Lloyd McClendon (hitting); 98 John Murrian (bullpen catcher); 99 Sam Palace (bullpen catcher); 83 A. J. Sager (bullpen) (June 27-); 39 Ramón Santiago (first base); 52 Joe Vavra (quality control)

== Player stats ==
=== Batting ===
Note: G = Games played; AB = At bats; R = Runs; H = Hits; 2B = Doubles; 3B = Triples; HR = Home runs; RBI = Runs batted in; SB = Stolen bases; BB = Walks; AVG = Batting average; SB = Stolen bases

Player	G	AB	R	H	2B	3B	HR	RBI	SB	BB	AVG	SLG
Nick Castellanos	157	620	88	185	46	5	23	89	2	49	.298	.500
Jeimer Candelario	144	539	78	121	28	3	19	54	3	66	.224	.393
Víctor Martínez	133	467	32	117	21	0	9	54	0	32	.251	.353
Niko Goodrum	131	444	55	109	29	3	16	53	12	42	.245	.432
José Iglesias	125	432	43	116	31	3	5	48	15	19	.269	.389
JaCoby Jones	129	429	54	89	22	6	11	34	13	24	.207	.364
James McCann	118	427	31	94	16	0	8	39	0	26	.220	.314
Leonys Martín	78	303	45	76	15	3	9	29	7	29	.251	.409
John Hicks	81	288	35	75	12	1	9	32	0	22	.260	.403
Mikie Mahtook	67	223	24	45	4	2	9	29	4	21	.202	.359
Dixon Machado	67	214	20	44	13	1	1	21	1	14	.206	.290
Victor Reyes	100	212	35	47	5	3	1	12	9	5	.222	.288
Ronny Rodríguez	62	191	17	42	7	0	5	20	2	10	.220	.335
Jim Adduci	59	176	19	47	8	2	3	21	1	6	.267	.386
Miguel Cabrera	38	134	17	40	11	0	3	22	0	22	.299	.448
Grayson Greiner	30	96	9	21	6	0	0	12	0	17	.219	.281
Dawel Lugo	27	94	10	20	4	1	1	8	0	7	.213	.309
Pete Kozma	27	69	7	15	4	1	1	8	0	2	.217	.348
Christin Stewart	17	60	7	16	1	1	2	10	0	10	.267	.417
Mike Gerber	18	42	2	4	1	0	0	2	0	4	.095	.119
Harold Castro	6	10	2	3	0	0	0	0	1	0	.300	.300
Jarrod Saltalamacchia	5	7	0	0	0	0	0	0	0	1	.000	.000
Pitcher totals	162	17	0	0	0	0	0	0	0	0	.000	.000
Team totals	162	5494	630	1326	284	35	135	597	70	428	.241	.380

=== Pitching ===
Note: W = Wins; L = Losses; ERA = Earned run average; G = Games pitched; GS = Games started; SV = Saves; IP = Innings pitched; H = Hits allowed; R = Runs allowed; ER = Earned runs allowed; BB = Walks allowed; SO = Strikeouts

Player	W	L	ERA	G	GS	SV	IP	H	R	ER	BB	SO
Matthew Boyd	9	13	4.39	31	31	0	170.1	146	87	83	51	159
Francisco Liriano	5	12	4.58	27	26	0	133.2	127	84	68	73	110
Michael Fulmer	3	12	4.69	24	24	0	132.1	128	75	69	46	110
Jordan Zimmerman	7	8	4.52	25	25	0	131.1	140	76	66	26	111
Mike Fiers	7	6	3.48	21	21	0	119.0	121	49	46	26	87
Blaine Hardy	4	5	3.56	30	13	1	86.0	79	37	34	22	66
Buck Farmer	3	4	4.15	66	1	0	69.1	67	34	32	41	57
Shane Greene	4	6	5.12	66	0	32	63.1	68	39	36	19	65
Joe Jiménez	5	4	4.31	68	0	3	62.2	53	34	30	22	78
Alex Wilson	2	4	3.36	59	0	0	61.2	50	24	23	15	43
Drew VerHagen	3	3	4.63	41	1	0	56.1	46	29	29	19	53
Louis Coleman	4	1	3.51	51	0	0	51.1	43	21	20	24	41
Daniel Norris	0	5	5.68	11	8	0	44.1	46	28	28	19	51
Artie Lewicki	0	2	4.89	13	3	0	38.2	48	24	21	14	30
Daniel Stumpf	1	5	4.93	56	0	0	38.1	44	23	21	16	37
Warwick Saupold	4	1	4.46	31	0	1	34.1	41	17	17	13	16
Victor Alcántara	1	1	2.40	27	0	0	30.0	25	8	8	6	21
Ryan Carpenter	1	2	7.25	6	5	0	22.1	34	19	18	4	15
Zac Reininger	1	0	7.59	18	0	0	21.1	28	18	18	9	18
Spencer Turnbull	0	2	6.06	4	3	0	16.1	17	11	11	4	15
Sandy Báez	0	0	5.02	9	0	0	14.1	12	12	8	9	10
Matt Hall	0	0	14.63	5	0	0	8.0	19	16	13	3	5
Chad Bell	0	1	8.59	3	0	0	7.1	14	7	7	2	7
Johnny Barbato	0	0	12.15	7	0	0	6.2	11	9	9	5	2
Zach McAllister	0	0	21.60	3	0	0	3.1	10	8	8	0	5
Josh Smoker	0	0	0.00	1	0	0	1.2	0	0	0	2	2
Jacob Turner	0	1	45.00	1	1	0	1.0	6	7	5	1	1
Team totals	64	98	4.58	162	162	37	1425.1	1423	796	726	491	1215

== Farm system ==
Level	Team	League	Manager
AAA	Toledo Mud Hens	International League	Doug Mientkiewicz
AA	Erie SeaWolves	Eastern League	Andrew Graham
A-Advanced	Lakeland Flying Tigers	Florida State League	Mike Rabelo
A	West Michigan Whitecaps	Midwest League	Lance Parrish
A-Short Season	Connecticut Tigers	New York–Penn League	Gerald Laird
Rookie	GCL Tigers East	Gulf Coast League	Jesus Garces
Rookie	GCL Tigers West	Gulf Coast League	Gary Cathcart
Rookie	DSL Tigers 1	Dominican Summer League	Ramon Zapata
Rookie	DSL Tigers 2	Dominican Summer League	Jesus Garces
