= Mario Impemba =

American sportscaster

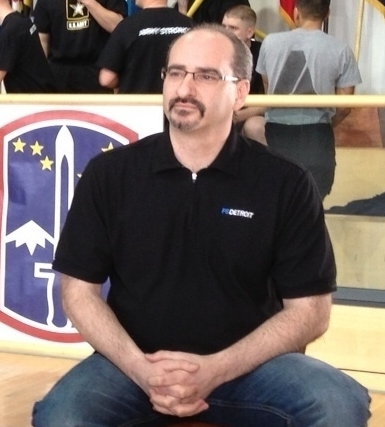
- Impemba in 2013
- Born: 1962 or 1963 (age 62–63); Detroit, Michigan, U.S.
- Education: Michigan State University
- Occupation: Sportscaster
- Years active: 1987–2019
- Sports commentary career
- Teams: Anaheim Angels (1995–2001); Detroit Tigers (2002–2018); Boston Red Sox (2019)
- Genre: Play-by-play
- Sport: Major League Baseball
- Website: www.marioimpemba.com

Mario Impemba (born 1962 or 1963) is an American former sportscaster, best known as the television play-by-play announcer for the Detroit Tigers from 2002 to 2018. Before working for the Tigers, he announced for the Los Angeles Angels on both television and radio and several minor league teams.

== Early life and education ==
Impemba was born in Detroit, Michigan, and grew up in nearby Sterling Heights, where he attended Stevenson High School. Impemba graduated from Michigan State University in 1985, where he was the sports director at the campus radio station and provided play-by-play for MSU baseball, basketball and hockey games.

== Career ==
=== Early career ===
Impemba began his professional career announcing games for the Peoria Chiefs single-A baseball club in 1987. He also served as the sports director at WXCL radio and the play-by-play voice of the Peoria Rivermen of the International Hockey League during the 1987–88 season. From 1989 to 1990, he served as the voice of the Quad City Angels single-A team in Davenport, Iowa. In 1991, Impemba began calling games for the Tucson Toros of the Pacific Coast League.

Impemba moved to Major League Baseball in 1995, serving as the radio (KLAA) and fill-in television (Fox Sports West and KCOP-TV) play-by-play voice of the Los Angeles Angels, a position he held until 2001.

=== Detroit Tigers ===
Beginning in 2002, Impemba joined the Tigers television team alongside color commentator Kirk Gibson, replacing play-by-play commentator Josh Lewin. In 2003, Gibson was named the Tigers' bench coach and was replaced in the broadcast booth by Rod Allen. The Impemba–Allen tandem would last from 2003 to 2018. In the last few years of his tenure, Impemba occasionally worked alongside Gibson and Jack Morris in Allen's absence.

On September 4, 2018, Impemba and Allen were involved in an off-air physical altercation immediately after broadcasting the Tigers' road game against the Chicago White Sox. Fox Sports Detroit sent the men home on different planes after the game, and the following night's telecast was covered by Matt Shepard and Kirk Gibson. While one source claimed that there was an argument over a chair, followed by Allen putting Impemba in a choke hold, Allen's agent denied that his client choked Impemba. On September 7, Fox Sports Detroit suspended both men from calling any Tigers games for the remainder of the 2018 season. Impemba and Allen's contracts were not renewed for future seasons, ending their 16-year partnership. Their longstanding tension may have stemmed from Allen's perceived lack of preparation for broadcasts. "Though non-friendly," wrote the Detroit Free Press, "the relationship between Impemba and Allen produced years of quality broadcasts on FSD and earned themselves—together—a spot in Tigers' lore."

=== Boston Red Sox ===
On February 13, 2019, Impemba was named a part-time play-by-play announcer for the Boston Red Sox Radio Network, but his contract was not renewed after the season. In 2023, The Detroit News wrote that Impemba considers himself "pretty much retired" from broadcasting.

=== Awards and other works ===
Impemba's book If These Walls Could Talk: Detroit Tigers was published in 2014. He won a Michigan Emmy Award in June 2006 in the sports play-by-play category.

== Personal life ==
Impemba and his wife Cathy are parents of two sons, Brett and Daniel. Brett was drafted in the 49th round of the 2011 Major League Baseball draft by the Detroit Tigers. The Impembas live in Macomb Township, Michigan.
