= Ryan Carpenter (baseball) =

American baseball player (born 1990)

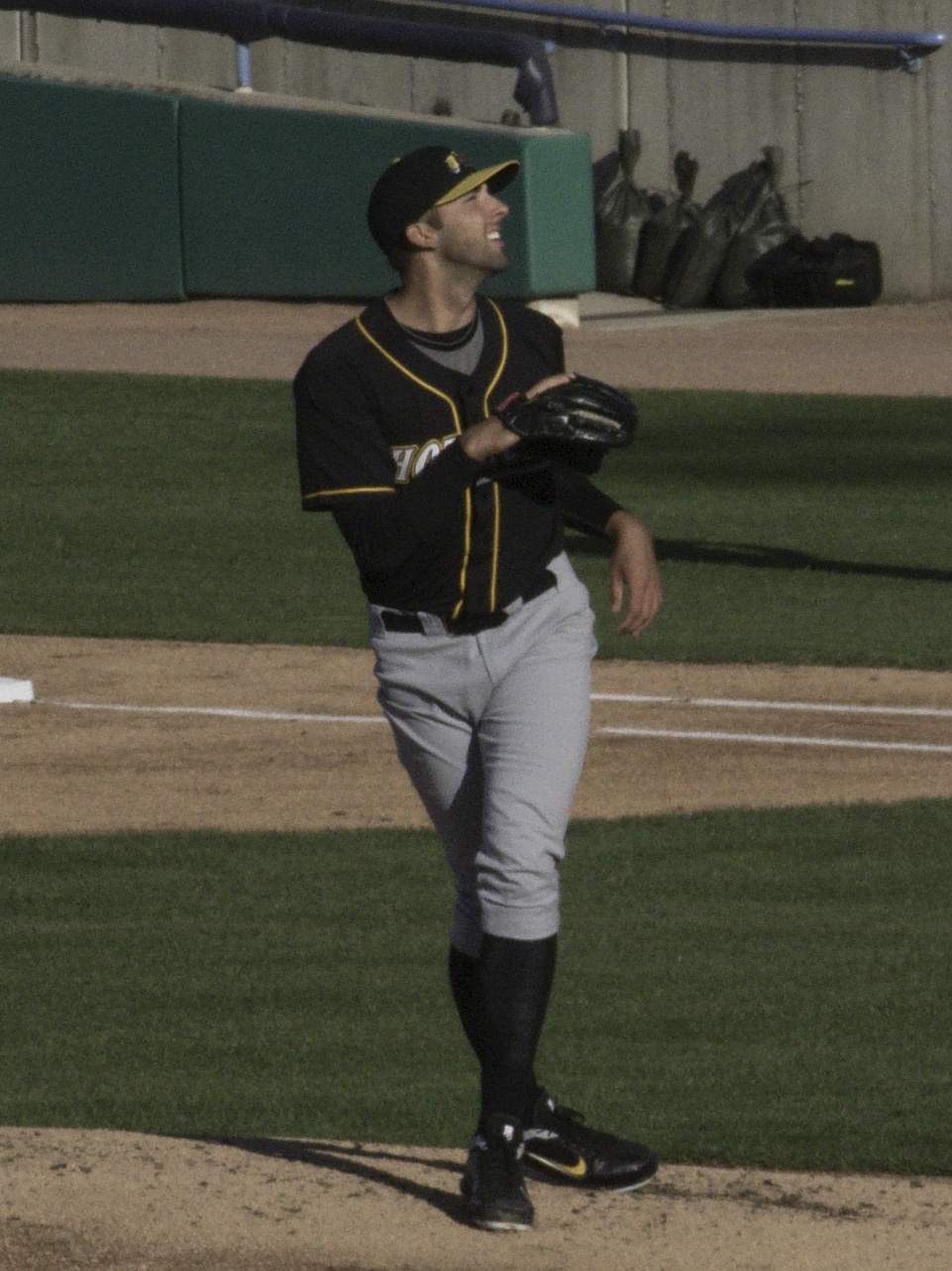
- Carpenter pitching for the Bowling Green Hot Rods in 2012
- Pitcher
- Born: August 22, 1990 (age 36); Glendale, Arizona, U.S.
- Batted: Left Threw: Left

Professional debut
- MLB: April 1, 2018, for the Detroit Tigers
- CPBL: April 15, 2020, for the Rakuten Monkeys
- KBO: April 6, 2021, for the Hanwha Eagles

Last appearance
- MLB: July 16, 2019, for the Detroit Tigers
- CPBL: October 14, 2020, for the Rakuten Monkeys
- KBO: May 25, 2022, for the Hanwha Eagles

MLB statistics
- Win–loss record: 2–8
- Earned run average: 8.57
- Strikeouts: 40

CPBL statistics
- Win–loss record: 10–7
- Earned run average: 4.00
- Strikeouts: 150

KBO statistics
- Win–loss record: 5–13
- Earned run average: 3.83
- Strikeouts: 194
- Stats at Baseball Reference

Teams
- Detroit Tigers (2018–2019); Rakuten Monkeys (2020); Hanwha Eagles (2021–2022)

Career highlights and awards
- CPBL Gold Glove award (2020)

Ryan Nicholas Carpenter (born August 22, 1990) is an American former professional baseball pitcher. He played in Major League Baseball (MLB) for the Detroit Tigers. He has also played in the Chinese Professional Baseball League (CPBL) for the Rakuten Monkeys as well as in the KBO League for the Hanwha Eagles.

== Career ==
Carpenter was drafted by the Tampa Bay Rays in the 21st round of the 2008 Major League Baseball draft out of Cactus High School in Glendale, Arizona. He did not sign and played college baseball at Gonzaga University. In 2010 and 2011, he played collegiate summer baseball with the Orleans Firebirds of the Cape Cod Baseball League.

Carpenter was again drafted by the Rays, this time in the seventh round of the 2011 MLB draft and signed. He was released by the Rays on March 21, 2014, and signed by the Colorado Rockies to a minor league contract on May 7. Carpenter remained in the Rockies minor league system until November 6, 2017, when he elected free agency.

=== Detroit Tigers ===
The Detroit Tigers signed Carpenter to a major league deal in November 2017. On April 1, 2018, Carpenter made his Major League debut with the Tigers when he was called up to start the second game of a double-header against the Pittsburgh Pirates as the 26th man. He pitched three innings in which he gave up five hits and three earned runs while striking out three and walking one; he did not earn a decision as the Pirates defeated the Tigers 8–6. Carpenter was again called up as the 26th man in a double-header on May 12, 2018. He came out of the bullpen in the fifth inning of the second game. Carpenter was called up to make another spot start six days later where he earned his first career loss after giving up five earned runs. He stayed on the 25 man roster for two days this time before being sent back down to Toledo. Ryan was next called up on May 30, the fourth time of the season, to start in place of an injured player. During his start the next day, Carpenter himself suffered an injury when he strained his right oblique, which landed him on the 10-day disabled list.

Recalled again on August 17, 2018, due to an injury to Tiger starter Blaine Hardy, Carpenter earned his first major league win over the Minnesota Twins the next night, surrendering three runs over 5 1/3 innings. The following season, Carpenter pitched in 9 starts for Detroit, going 1-6 before being designated for assignment.

Carpenter was released by the Tigers on September 3, 2019.

=== Rakuten Monkeys ===
On January 11, 2020, Carpenter signed with the Rakuten Monkeys of the Chinese Professional Baseball League. Carpenter won a Gold Glove award as a pitcher in the 2020 season.

=== Hanwha Eagles ===
On November 28, 2020, Carpenter signed a one-year, $500,000 contract with the Hanwha Eagles of the KBO League. He made 31 appearances (30 starts) for Hanwha in 2021, compiling a 5-12 record and 3.97 ERA with 179 strikeouts over 170 innings of work.

On December 28, 2021, Carpenter re-signed with the Eagles on a one-year, $750,000 contract. In four starts for Hanwha in 2022, he logged an 0-1 record and 2.50 ERA with 15 strikeouts across 18 innings pitched. Carpenter was released by the Eagles on May 31, 2022, due to an elbow injury, and was replaced on the roster by Yefry Ramírez.

=== San Diego Padres ===
On October 31, 2023, Carpenter signed a minor league contract with the San Diego Padres organization. He made 14 starts for the Triple-A El Paso Chihuahuas, struggling to a 2-6 record and 8.85 ERA with 44 strikeouts over 59 innings of work. Carpenter elected free agency following the season on November 4, 2024.

On February 16, 2025, Carpenter announced his retirement from professional baseball.
