= Dixon Machado =

Venezuelan baseball player (born 1992)

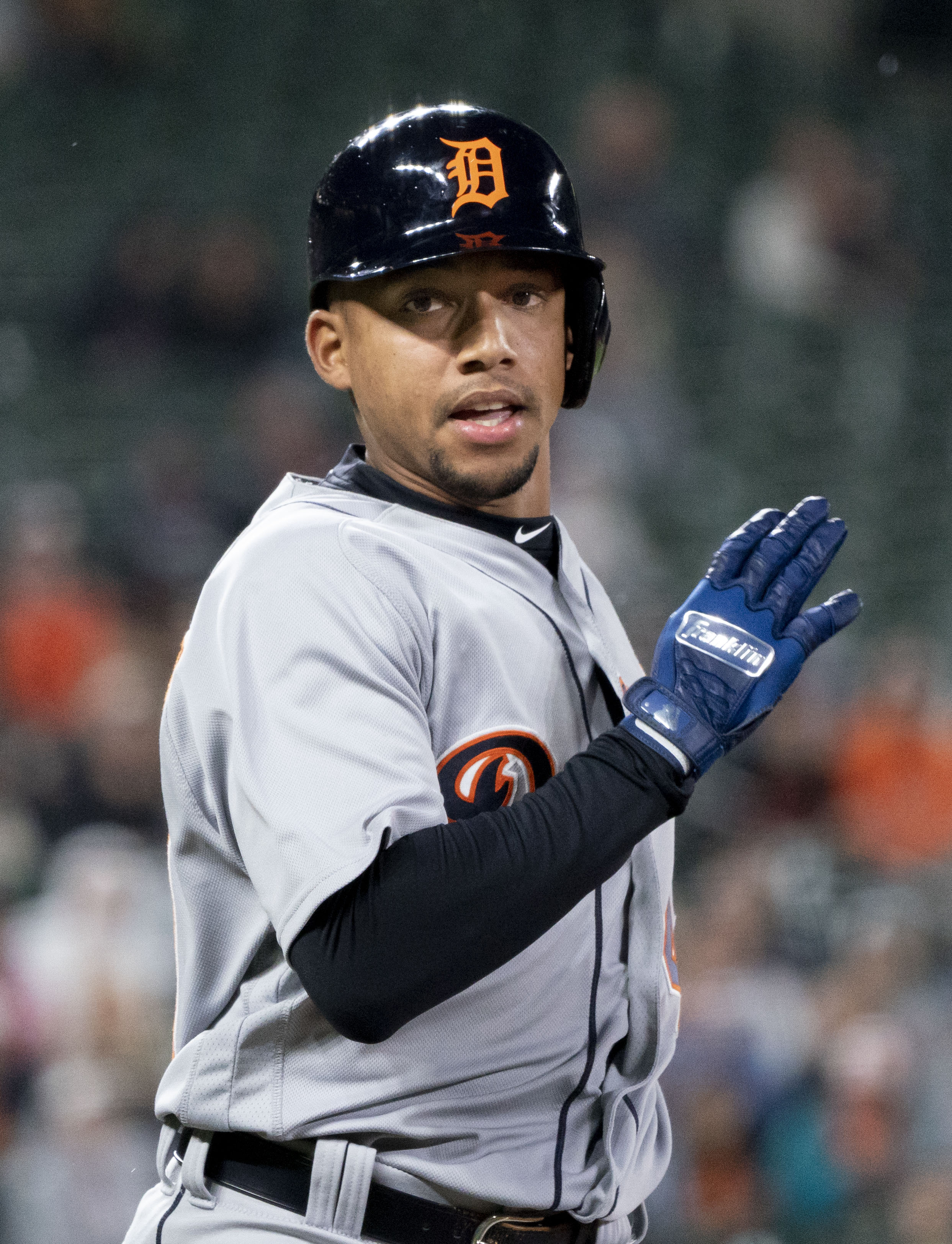
- Machado with the Detroit Tigers in 2018
- Shortstop
- Born: February 22, 1992 (age 34); San Cristóbal, Táchira, Venezuela
- Batted: Right Threw: Right

Professional debut
- MLB: May 25, 2015, for the Detroit Tigers
- KBO: May 5, 2020, for the Lotte Giants

Last appearance
- MLB: August 4, 2022, for the San Francisco Giants
- KBO: October 30, 2021, for the Lotte Giants

MLB statistics
- Batting average: .226
- Home run: 2
- Runs batted in: 37

KBO statistics
- Batting average: .279
- Home runs: 17
- Runs batted in: 125
- Stats at Baseball Reference

Teams
- Detroit Tigers (2015–2018); Lotte Giants (2020–2021); San Francisco Giants (2022)

Dixon Javier Machado Moreno (born February 22, 1992) is a Venezuelan former professional baseball shortstop. He played in Major League Baseball (MLB) for the Detroit Tigers and San Francisco Giants, and in the KBO League for the Lotte Giants.

== Playing career ==
=== Detroit Tigers ===
==== Minor leagues ====
The Detroit Tigers signed Machado as an international amateur free agent in 2008. The Tigers purchased Machado's contract after the 2012 season, adding him to their 40-man roster to protect him from the Rule 5 draft. He was designated for assignment on December 4, 2013, to make room on the 40-man roster for Joe Nathan. He was added to the 40-man roster again on November 20, 2014.

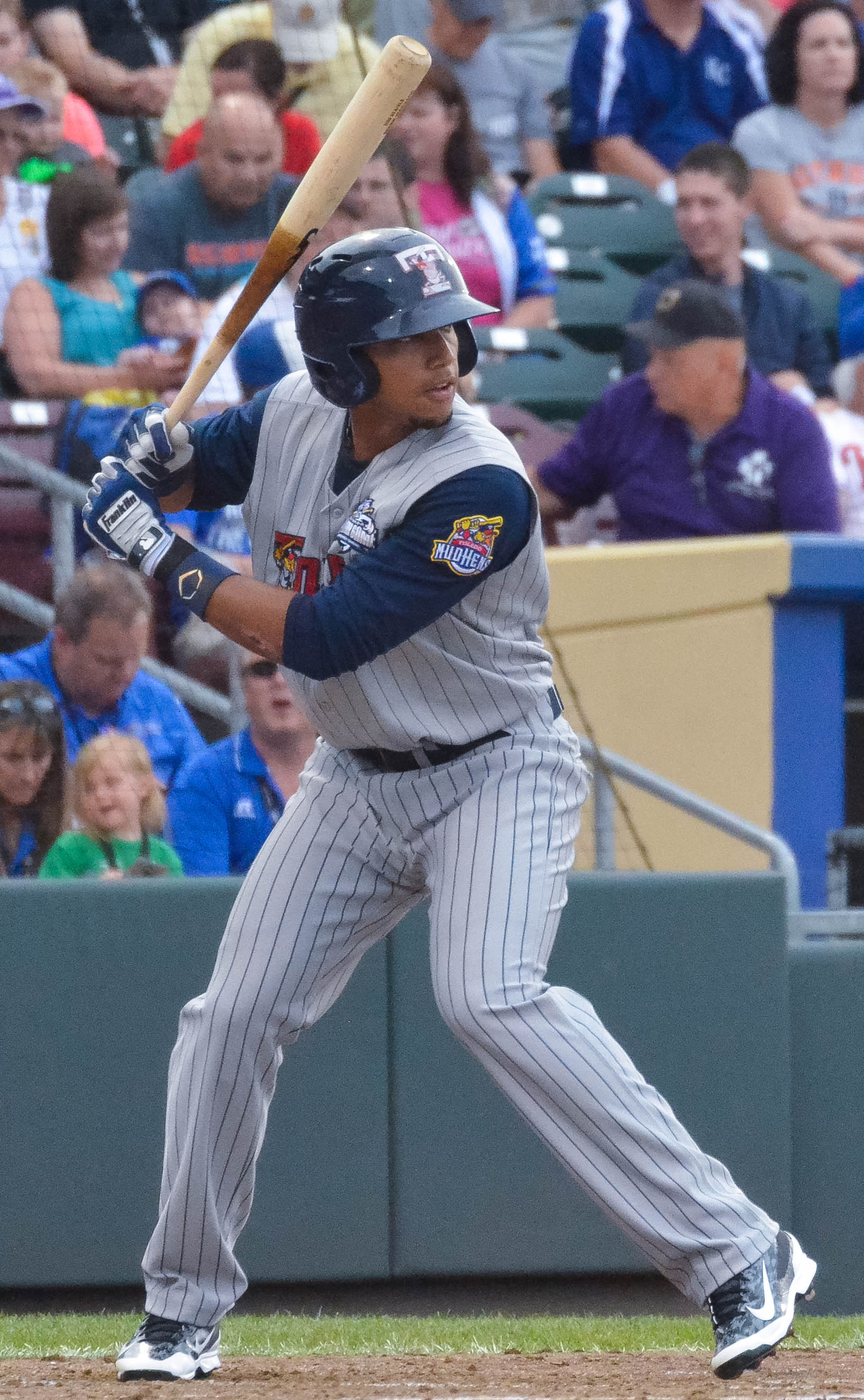
Machado at the 2015 Triple-A All-Star Game

During the 2014 season, he hit .305/.391/.442 with five home runs and 32 RBI, with a .965 fielding percentage in 90 games with the Double-A Erie SeaWolves. He also appeared in 41 games with the Class-A Advanced Lakeland Flying Tigers, hitting .252 with one home run and eight RBI, with a .972 fielding percentage. Machado was named the Eastern League Player of the Month for the month of August 2014. He hit .410 (34-for-83) with six doubles, three home runs, 17 runs scored, 15 RBI, five stolen bases, a .515 on-base percentage and a .590 slugging percentage in 25 games during the month. He ranked first among all Eastern League hitters in batting average (.410), on-base percentage (.590), and OPS (1.105), tied for second in hits (34), third in slugging percentage (.590) and walks (18).

==== Major leagues ====
The Tigers promoted Machado to the major leagues from the Triple-A Toledo Mud Hens on May 24, 2015. He made his major league debut the next day in a game against the Oakland Athletics. Prior to being called up, Machado was hitting .274 with one home run and 16 RBI in 40 games with the Mud Hens. On May 27, Machado got his first career major league hit, a single off of Sean Doolittle of the Oakland Athletics in the sixth inning.

Machado was named to the International League's all-star team in 2015, and played in the Triple-A All-Star Game. On September 1, 2015, Machado was named to the International League post-season All-Star game. Machado was hitting .259 with 47 RBI, 15 steals, and a .640 OPS in 124 games with the Mud Hens. His .976 fielding percentage ranked among the best for International League shortstops.

Machado was named the Venezuelan Winter League Player of Week for the week ending October 26, 2015. While playing for Leones del Caracas, Machado batted 22-for-57 (.386) with seven doubles, three home runs and 11 RBIs.

Machado spent most of 2016 with the Toledo Mud Hens, batting .266/.349/.356, receiving a promotion to Detroit in mid-August. He played in eight games for the Tigers after he was promoted.

Machado made the 2017 Opening Day roster for the Tigers. On July 6, he hit his first major league home run off Chris Stratton of the San Francisco Giants. Machado hit .259/.302/.319 in 166 at bats for the 2017 Tigers.

Machado again made the Tigers' Opening Day roster in 2018. He hit a ninth-inning walk-off home run on April 18, lifting the Tigers to a win over the Baltimore Orioles, but was designated for assignment on July 4 after batting .206/.263/.290 in 67 games with only that one home run. After clearing waivers unclaimed by any other major league team, Machado could have elected free agency but chose to accept the assignment to AAA Toledo on July 8, for whom he batted .225/.321/.279. He declared free agency on October 3, 2018.

=== Chicago Cubs ===
On November 29, 2018, Machado signed a minor league contract with the Miami Marlins. He was released prior to the start of the season on March 26, 2019.

On March 29, 2019, Machado signed a minor league contract with the Chicago Cubs, and was assigned to Triple–A Iowa Cubs. With Iowa he batted .261/.371/.480 with 17 home runs and 65 RBI, and a .978 fielding percentage at shortstop. Machado elected free agency following the season on November 4.

=== Lotte Giants ===
On November 22, 2019, Machado signed a one-year contract with the Lotte Giants of the KBO League. On November 6, 2020, Machado re-signed with the Giants on a one-year, $650,000 deal with an option for the 2022 season. Over Machado's two years with the Lotte Giants, he played in 277 games, hitting .280/.359/.393 with 17 home runs, 125 RBIs, and 23 steals in 949 at bats, with a .982 fielding percentage at shortstop. He became a free agent following the 2021 season.

=== Chicago Cubs (second stint) ===
On December 17, 2021, Machado signed a minor league contract with the Chicago Cubs. He began the 2022 season with the Triple-A Iowa Cubs. In 2022 with Iowa, he batted .312/.402/.394 with 10 steals in 340 at bats, with a .990 fielding percentage at shortstop. He requested a trade from the organization on July 31, 2022.

=== San Francisco Giants ===
The Cubs traded Machado to the San Francisco Giants in exchange for Raynel Espinal on July 31, 2022, and the Giants promoted Machado to the major leagues to fill in for injured shortstops Brandon Crawford and Thairo Estrada. On August 6, the Giants designated Machado for assignment. He cleared waivers and was sent outright to the Triple-A Sacramento River Cats on August 9. Machado elected free agency following the season on October 6.

=== Houston Astros ===
On November 22, 2022, Machado signed a minor league contract with the Houston Astros that included an invitation to Major League Spring Training. In 2023, he played in 81 games split between the Triple–A Sugar Land Space Cowboys and rookie–level Florida Complex League Astros, batting a combined .231/.380/.356 with seven home runs and 34 RBI.

Machado played in 49 games for Sugar Land and the FCL Astros in 2024, slashing .228/.335/.305 with three home runs and 23 RBI. He was released by the Astros organization on August 31, 2024.

=== Chicago Cubs (third stint) ===
On February 12, 2025, Machado signed a minor league contract with the Chicago Cubs. He made 84 appearances for the Triple-A Iowa Cubs, batting .221/.345/.301 with four home runs, 34 RBI, and four stolen bases. Machado elected free agency following the season on November 6.

== Coaching career ==
On February 18, 2026, Machado was announced as the manager for the Arizona Complex League Cubs, the rookie-level affiliate of the Chicago Cubs.

== See also ==
- List of Major League Baseball players from Venezuela
