= Rod Allen =

American baseball player and broadcaster (born 1959)

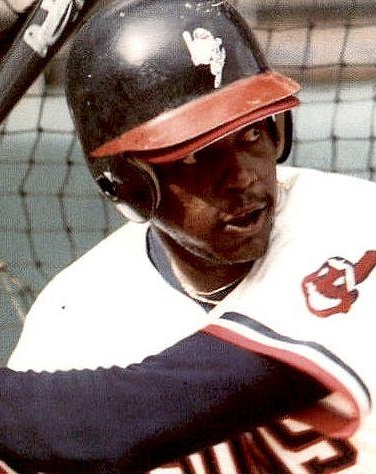
- Outfielder
- Born: October 5, 1959 (age 67); Los Angeles, California, U.S.
- Batted: Right Threw: Right

Professional debut
- MLB: April 7, 1983, for the Seattle Mariners
- NPB: April 8, 1989, for the Hiroshima Toyo Carp

Last appearance
- MLB: October 2, 1988, for the Cleveland Indians
- NPB: October 28, 1991, for the Hiroshima Toyo Carp

MLB statistics
- Batting average: .220
- Home runs: 0
- Runs batted in: 3

NPB statistics
- Batting average: .288
- Home runs: 45
- Runs batted in: 133
- Stats at Baseball Reference

Teams
- Seattle Mariners (1983); Detroit Tigers (1984); Cleveland Indians (1988); Hiroshima Toyo Carp (1989–1991)

Roderick Bernet Allen (born October 5, 1959) is an American former professional baseball outfielder and current game analyst for the Miami Marlins on Fan Duel Sports Network Florida.

He played for the Seattle Mariners, Tigers, and Cleveland Indians of the Major League Baseball (MLB), and also the Hiroshima Toyo Carp of Nippon Professional Baseball (NPB).

He formerly worked as a broadcaster for the Detroit Tigers and Arizona Diamondbacks.

== Baseball ==
=== Playing career ===
Allen was selected by the Chicago White Sox in the sixth round of the 1977 Major League Baseball draft. He played a brief stint with the Seattle Mariners in 1983. He was 23 years old when he made his major league debut on April 7, 1983. He hit .296 in 27 at-bats during a 15-game stint as an outfielder and designated hitter with the World Series champion Detroit Tigers in 1984 but was not on the team during the postseason. He enjoyed another brief stint in the majors with the Cleveland Indians in 1988. Allen spent the last three years of his playing career with the Hiroshima Toyo Carp of the NPB. He hit a pair of home runs against Seibu Lions in the 1991 Japan Series and set a Japanese regular season record with four home runs in four consecutive at bats during his time in the league. He is infamous for charging the mound after Yokohama Taiyo Whales pitcher Kazuhiko Daimon hit him in the back with a pitch, subsequently chasing Daimon across the entire field with both teams' benches in tow.

=== Coaching career ===
Prior to his work as a broadcaster, Allen spent four seasons as a hitting instructor in the Florida Marlins organization from 1992 through 1995. In 1994 and 1995, he was the hitting coach for the Kane County Cougars, the Marlins Single-A affiliate in the Midwest League. Some of the notable batters he coached include Mike Redmond, Kevin Millar, and Luis Castillo. During his time in the organization, Allen worked under Marlins GM Dave Dombrowski, who would later become the Tigers president, CEO, and general manager.

=== Broadcasting ===
==== Arizona Diamondbacks ====
From 1998 to 2002 he spent five seasons with the Arizona Diamondbacks as a television (Fox Sports Arizona) and radio (KTAR) analyst. He served as the color commentator on the Diamondbacks radio broadcasts during the 2001 postseason, including the World Series win against the New York Yankees. Allen was replaced as Diamondbacks television analyst by former major leaguer Mark Grace.

==== Detroit Tigers ====
Allen was the regular color commentator on Detroit Tigers telecasts for Fox Sports Detroit, joined by play-by-play man Mario Impemba. Allen won Michigan Emmys in 2006 and 2007 for his analysis of Detroit Tigers baseball.

Allen is a longtime member of the Detroit Sports Broadcasters Association founded in 1948 by Tigers broadcaster Ty Tyson.

On September 21, 2016, Tigers catcher James McCann hit a three-run home run against the Minnesota Twins that put the Tigers up 6–0 in the sixth inning. Allen excitedly shouted "Second Deck!", but when heard, it sounded like "suck a dick." This was picked up by Detroit radio station WXYT-FM and it became their most popular drop.

On September 4, 2018, Allen and Impemba were allegedly involved in a physical altercation off the air after broadcasting the Tigers game against the Chicago White Sox. Fox Sports Detroit sent the men home on different planes after the game, and the next night's telecast was covered by Kirk Gibson and field-level reporter Matt Shepard. One source claimed that there was an argument over a chair, followed by Allen using a choke hold on Impemba, but Allen's agent denied that his client choked Impemba. On September 7, Fox Sports Detroit suspended both men from calling any Tigers games for the remainder of the 2018 season. It was later announced the contracts of both Impemba and Allen were not renewed for future seasons, ending their 16-year partnership.

==== Fox Saturday Baseball ====
In addition to his work for the Diamondbacks and Tigers, Allen did color commentary for Fox Saturday Baseball, including games involving the Tigers until 2018.

==== Miami Marlins ====
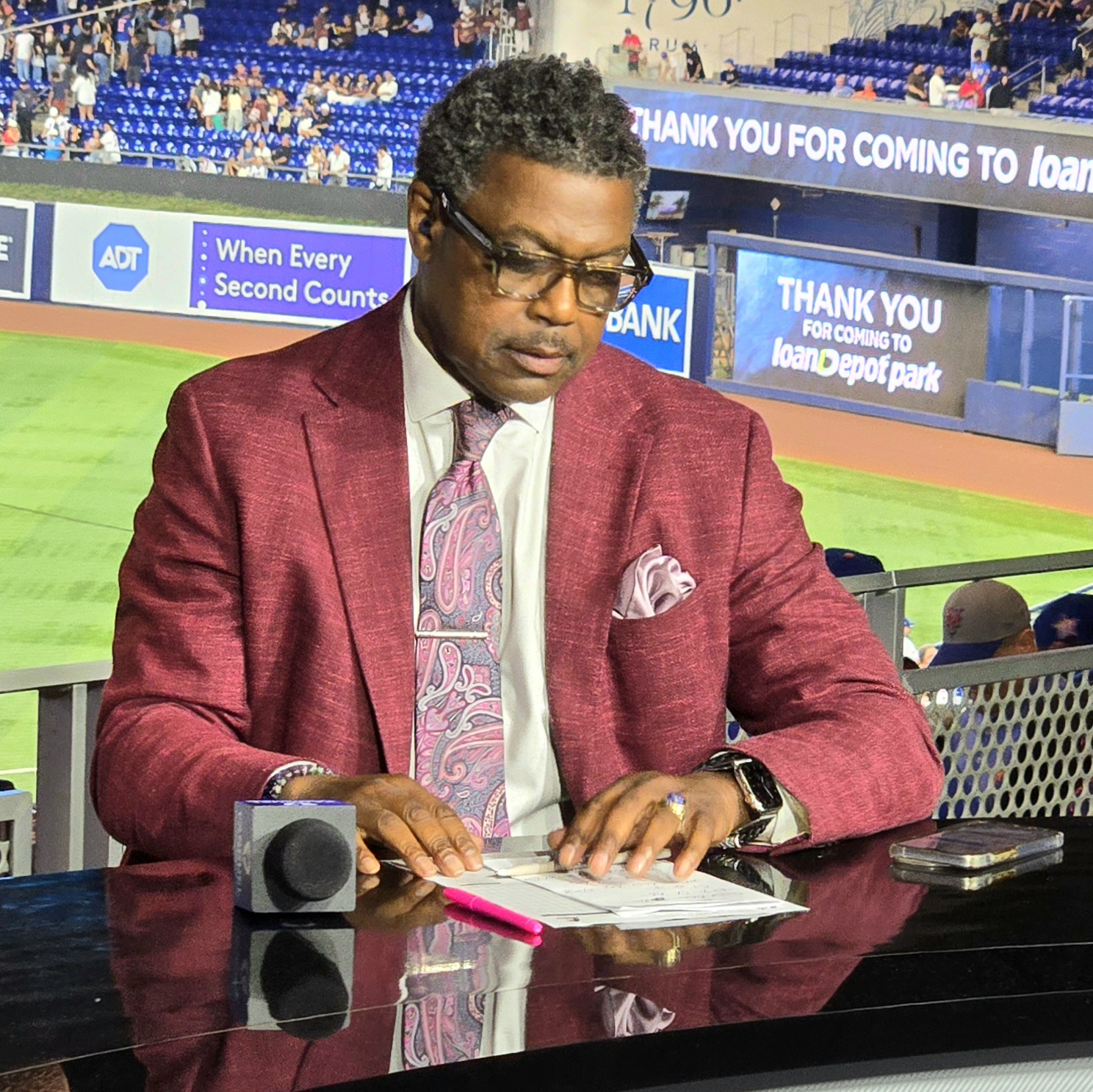
Allen at loanDepot Park for a Marlins game in 2025

In March 2022 it was announced Allen would be joining Bally Sports Florida as an analyst for Miami Marlins telecasts.

== Personal life ==
Allen and his wife have four children. The Allens live in the Phoenix, Arizona area. Their son Rod Jr. was selected by the New York Yankees in the 12th round of the 2004 Major League Baseball draft after a collegiate career at Arizona State University. He played the 2004 season with the Staten Island Yankees in the New York–Penn League, and played for the Class A Winston-Salem Warthogs in 2006 and 2007. His most recent professional stint was in 2011 with the White Sands Pupfish in the Pecos League. Their son Andrew was selected by the Arizona Diamondbacks in the 43rd round of the 2007 MLB draft. He attended Desert Vista High School in Phoenix, Arizona.
