= Matthew Boyd (baseball) =

American baseball player (born 1991)

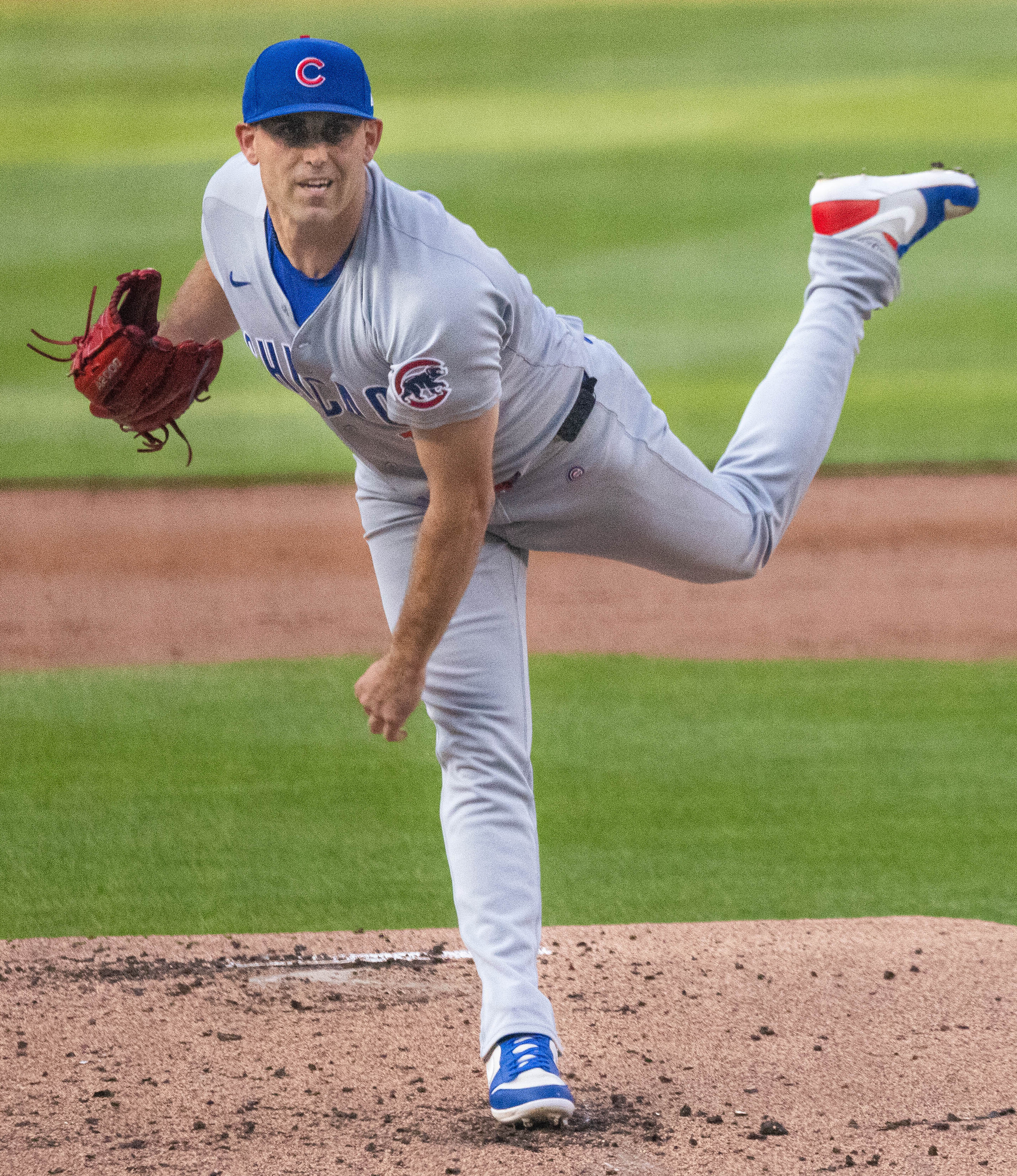
- Boyd with the Chicago Cubs in 2025

Free agent
- Pitcher
- Born: February 2, 1991 (age 35); Mercer Island, Washington, U.S.
- Bats: Left Throws: Left

MLB debut
- June 27, 2015, for the Toronto Blue Jays

MLB statistics (through 2026 season)
- Win–loss record: 70–82
- Earned run average: 4.50
- Strikeouts: 1,141
- Stats at Baseball Reference

Teams
- Toronto Blue Jays (2015); Detroit Tigers (2015–2021); Seattle Mariners (2022); Detroit Tigers (2023); Cleveland Guardians (2024); Chicago Cubs (2025–2026)

Career highlights and awards
- All-Star (2025)
Medals
Men's baseball
Representing United States
World Baseball Classic
Silver medal – second place	2026 Miami	Team

Matthew Robert Boyd (born February 2, 1991) is an American professional baseball pitcher who is a free agent. He has previously played in Major League Baseball (MLB) for the Toronto Blue Jays, Seattle Mariners, Detroit Tigers, Cleveland Guardians, and Chicago Cubs.

Boyd played college baseball for Oregon State University. In the 2013 MLB draft, the Blue Jays selected Boyd in the sixth round. He made his MLB debut with the Blue Jays in 2015 and was traded to Detroit during the season. He played for the Tigers through the 2021 season and played for Seattle in 2022. Boyd joined the Tigers again in 2023 before playing for the Guardians in 2024 and signing with the Cubs in 2025. In 2025, Boyd was named to his first All-Star team.

== Amateur career ==
A native of Mercer Island, Washington, Boyd played his freshman high school season at Mercer Island High School before transferring to Eastside Catholic School in Sammamish, Washington. He graduated from Oregon State University, where he played college baseball for the Oregon State Beavers for four years. In 2011 and 2012, he played collegiate summer baseball with the Orleans Firebirds of the Cape Cod Baseball League, and was named a league all-star in 2012. In the 2012 Major League Baseball draft, the Cincinnati Reds selected Boyd in the 13th round, but he did not sign.

== Professional career ==
=== Early and minor league career ===
In the 2013 Major League Baseball draft, the Toronto Blue Jays selected Boyd in the sixth round. He signed, receiving a $75,000 signing bonus.

Boyd was initially assigned to the Class-A Lansing Lugnuts, where he recorded a 0.64 earned run average in 14 innings before being promoted to the Advanced-A Dunedin Blue Jays, where he spent the remainder of the 2013 season. He posted an 0–2 record in Dunedin with a 5.40 ERA in 10 innings pitched. In 2014, Boyd pitched 90 2/3 innings with Dunedin, earning a 5–3 record, 1.39 ERA, and 103 strikeouts before earning a promotion to the Double-A New Hampshire Fisher Cats. He struggled in his first trip to New Hampshire, pitching to a 1–4 record, 6.96 ERA, and 44 strikeouts in 42 2/3 innings. Through his first nine starts with the Fisher Cats in 2015, Boyd led the league in both ERA (1.05) and strikeouts (56). He was promoted to the Triple-A Buffalo Bisons in June 2015 and made his first start on June 14 against the Charlotte Knights. Boyd took the loss, yielding two runs (one earned) with eight strikeouts and no walks in seven innings pitched for the Bisons. At the time of his call-up, he was considered the No. 19 prospect in the Blue Jays organization by MLB.

=== Toronto Blue Jays ===
On June 26, 2015, Boyd was called up by the Blue Jays to start against the Texas Rangers the following day. He pitched 6 2/3 innings against the Rangers and took the loss, yielding 4 runs while striking out 7. Boyd's 7 strikeouts tied the Blue Jays franchise record for strikeouts in a debut.

Despite having pitched 6.2 innings for the Blue Jays in 2015, the Blue Jays (who made the 2015 ALDS playoffs) elected to not award Boyd any money from the available pool of playoff share funds. This money is distributed amongst the team and staff; typically, players who were traded or released through the year are awarded partial shares or grants from the playoff pool. Although Boyd was shut out, monetary grants were awarded to several other Blue Jays players whose contributions were minimal, including Phil Coke (2.2 innings pitched), Colt Hynes (3.0 innings pitched), and Chad Jenkins (3.2 innings pitched).

=== Detroit Tigers ===
==== 2015 ====
On July 30, 2015, the Blue Jays traded Boyd, Daniel Norris and Jairo Labourt to the Detroit Tigers in exchange for David Price. He was assigned to the Triple-A Toledo Mud Hens. Boyd was recalled by the Tigers on August 5. Before being recalled, Boyd posted a 9–2 record and a 1.65 ERA in 19 starts between Double-A New Hampshire, Triple-A Buffalo and Toledo. In his debut for the Tigers on August 5, Boyd pitched seven innings, allowing seven hits, and one earned run, with two strikeouts, and no walks, earning his first career major league win, in a 2–1 Tigers victory over the Kansas City Royals.

==== 2016 ====
On March 30, 2016, Boyd was optioned to the Triple-A Toledo Mud Hens. Boyd was recalled from Toledo on April 24 and made one relief appearance against the Cleveland Indians, but was sent back to Triple-A shortly after. Following the news that Jordan Zimmermann would miss a start, Boyd was recalled to the Tigers again on May 27. He was later placed in the starting rotation when Aníbal Sánchez was demoted to the Tiger bullpen on May 31. Following an ineffective start on June 18, Boyd was optioned to Triple-A Toledo for the third time this season. Boyd was back up with the Tigers by July 9, after both Jordan Zimmermann and Daniel Norris were placed on the disabled list within 24 hours of each other. He made the best start of his young career on July 18, allowing no runs and only three hits in six innings against the Minnesota Twins, earning the win in a 1–0 decision. On August 13, Boyd had his longest start of the season to date, allowing just two hits and two walks over seven innings of a 2–0 win against the Texas Rangers. In a September 20 victory over the Twins, Boyd pitched a career-high eight innings, giving up just three hits and a run, while striking out seven. Boyd had an improved season in 2016, posting a 6–5 record and a 4.53 ERA in 18 starts, while striking out 82 batters in 97 1/3 innings.

==== 2017 ====
Boyd began the 2017 season in the Tigers starting rotation. On June 2, 2017, Boyd was optioned to the Triple-A Toledo Mud Hens. Prior to being optioned to Toledo, Boyd posted a 2–5 record with a 5.69 ERA. Boyd was recalled to the Tigers on July 17 to make a July 18 start for the injured Daniel Norris against the Kansas City Royals. After Boyd earned the win in a 9–3 Tigers victory, the team announced they were optioning Blaine Hardy to Toledo and keeping Boyd on the major league roster. On September 17 against the Chicago White Sox, Boyd took a no-hitter into the ninth inning, until a two-out double by Tim Anderson ended the chance. Boyd retired the next batter for his first career complete game and shutout in the Tigers 12–0 win. For the 2017 season, Boyd started 25 games, going 6–11 with a 5.27 ERA and striking out 110 batters in 135 innings.

==== 2018 ====
Boyd set career highs in 2018 with 31 starts and 170 1/3 innings pitched, posting a 9–13 record with a 4.39 ERA and 159 strikeouts. He allowed only 146 hits during the season, his 7.714 hits per nine innings ranked 10th among qualified American League starters.

==== 2019 ====
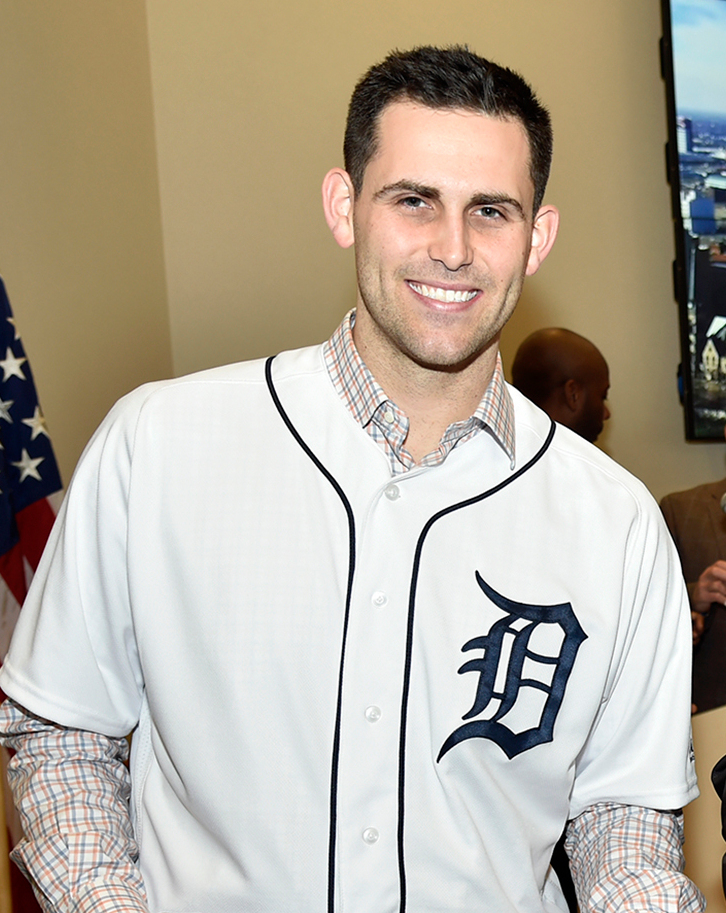
Boyd in 2019

On January 11, 2019, the Tigers avoided arbitration with Boyd, agreeing on a one-year, $2.6 million contract. Boyd posted 10 strikeouts in his first start of the season. In his next start on April 3 against the New York Yankees, Boyd recorded a career-high 13 strikeouts, becoming the first Tigers pitcher since 1908 to start the season with consecutive double-digit strikeout games. Boyd also set a record for the most strikeouts by a visiting pitcher at the current Yankee Stadium. His 13 strikeouts were the most by any Tigers pitcher since Max Scherzer recorded 14 in August 2014. On July 4 against the Chicago White Sox, Boyd became the first pitcher in the live-ball era to record 13 strikeouts and zero walks in an appearance of six innings or fewer. He finished the first half of the season with 142 strikeouts, the most strikeouts by a Tigers left-handed pitcher prior to the All-Star break since Mickey Lolich struck out 156 in 1972. On August 18, Boyd became the first Tiger pitcher to top 200 strikeouts since Justin Verlander in 2016, and the first left-handed Tiger to do so since Mickey Lolich in 1974. In 2019, he struck out 238 batters in 185 1/3 innings for a stellar 11.6/9 IP strikeout rate, but he also had the worst home runs/9 IP ratio among major league starters, at 1.89. His 39 home runs allowed led the American League. Boyd finished the season 9–12 with a 4.56 ERA.

==== 2020 ====
On January 10, 2020, the Tigers avoided arbitration with Boyd, agreeing on a one-year, $5.3 million contract.

In 2020 he was 3–7 with a league-worst 6.71 ERA. He had the American League's highest totals of losses, home runs allowed (15), home runs allowed per nine innings (2.2), and slugging percentage against (.552), and tied for the AL's highest totals of earned runs allowed (45) and hits allowed per nine innings (10.0).

==== 2021 ====
On January 15, 2021, the Tigers and Boyd agreed to a one-year, $6.5 million contract, avoiding arbitration. On March 22, Tigers manager A. J. Hinch announced that Boyd would be the Tigers opening day starter. Boyd earned the opening day win on April 1, pitching six shutout innings in the Tigers 3–2 win over the Cleveland Indians. Boyd was placed on the 10-day injured list on June 15 due to a triceps strain, and was moved to the 60-day injured list on August 12. He returned to the Tigers on August 29 to make his first start since the injury, only to suffer a forearm issue in early September that ended his season. He made just 15 starts for the 2021 Tigers, posting a 3–8 record with a 3.89 ERA.

On November 30, 2021, the Tigers non-tendered Boyd, making him a free agent.

=== San Francisco Giants ===
On March 20, 2022, Boyd signed a deal with the San Francisco Giants on a one-year contract worth $5.2 million. The deal included up to $2.3 million in incentive bonuses, based on the number of starts Boyd made in 2022. However, Boyd did not appear for the Giants due to recovering from forearm flexor tendon surgery.

=== Seattle Mariners ===
On August 2, 2022, Boyd and Curt Casali were traded to the Seattle Mariners in exchange for Michael Stryffeler and Andy Thomas. He made his Mariners debut against his former team, the Detroit Tigers, on September 1, pitching a scoreless 8th inning. On September 4, Boyd recorded his first win of the season and with the Mariners. He pitched a scoreless 10th inning in a road game against the Cleveland Guardians, giving up no hits, and leading the Mariners to a 6–3 win in 11 innings.

He made his postseason debut with the Mariners, getting one out in Game 3 of the AL Division Series.

=== Detroit Tigers (second stint) ===
On December 14, 2022, Boyd signed a one-year contract to return to the Detroit Tigers. The contract has a base salary of $10 million, with an additional $1 million in performance-based bonuses. Boyd made 15 starts for the Tigers in 2023, registering a 5–5 record and 5.45 ERA with 73 strikeouts in 71 innings pitched. On June 26, he left a start against the Texas Rangers after allowing one run on one hit and two strikeouts in 2/3 of an inning. It was later revealed that he had been pulled due to left elbow discomfort. The following day, it was announced that Boyd had been diagnosed with a partial sprain of his UCL and would undergo Tommy John surgery, ending his season. He became a free agent after the season.

=== Cleveland Guardians ===
On June 29, 2024, Boyd signed a one-year major league contract with the Cleveland Guardians and placed on the 15-day injured list while he recovered from elbow surgery. In 8 starts for Cleveland, Boyd posted a 2–2 record and 2.76 ERA with 46 strikeouts across 39 2/3 innings pitched.

He returned to the postseason, starting three games and posting a 0.77 ERA in 11 2/3 innings.

=== Chicago Cubs ===
On December 7, 2024, Boyd signed a two-year contract with the Chicago Cubs. On June 25, 2025, against the St. Louis Cardinals, Boyd pitched six shutout innings, reaching 1,000 career MLB innings pitched. He allowed three hits and struck out three batters in an 8–0 Cubs win. Boyd was selected to the National League All-Star team, as a reserve on July 6. On that same day, he struck out nine batters and only allowed three hits in an 11–0 win against the Cardinals. On July 28, against the Milwaukee Brewers, Boyd recorded his 1,000th career strikeout when he struck out Jackson Chourio in the third inning.

Boyd injured his left meniscus on May 6, 2026, while playing with his kids. It was subsequently announced that he would miss about six weeks of action after undergoing surgery. On October 30, Boyd declined his half of a mutual contract option and became a free agent.

== Pitching style ==
Boyd throws four primary pitches. He throws a four-seam fastball in the 89–93 MPH range (topping out at 96 MPH), a slider that averages 83 MPH, a curveball at 75 MPH, and a changeup at 80 MPH. The slider has been his most effective offspeed pitch, yielding only a .205 batting average against (through 2020). In 2016, he threw more sinkers than any other offspeed pitch, but it proved to be the most hittable of all his pitches (.321 batting average against). Thus, he threw the pitch less in 2017, and rarely threw it at all in 2018.

== Personal life ==
Boyd is married. The couple has four children. He is a Christian.

Boyd is distantly related to Hall of Fame pitcher Bob Feller as well as former First Lady of the United States Dolley Madison.
