= Víctor Reyes =

Venezuelan baseball player (born 1994)

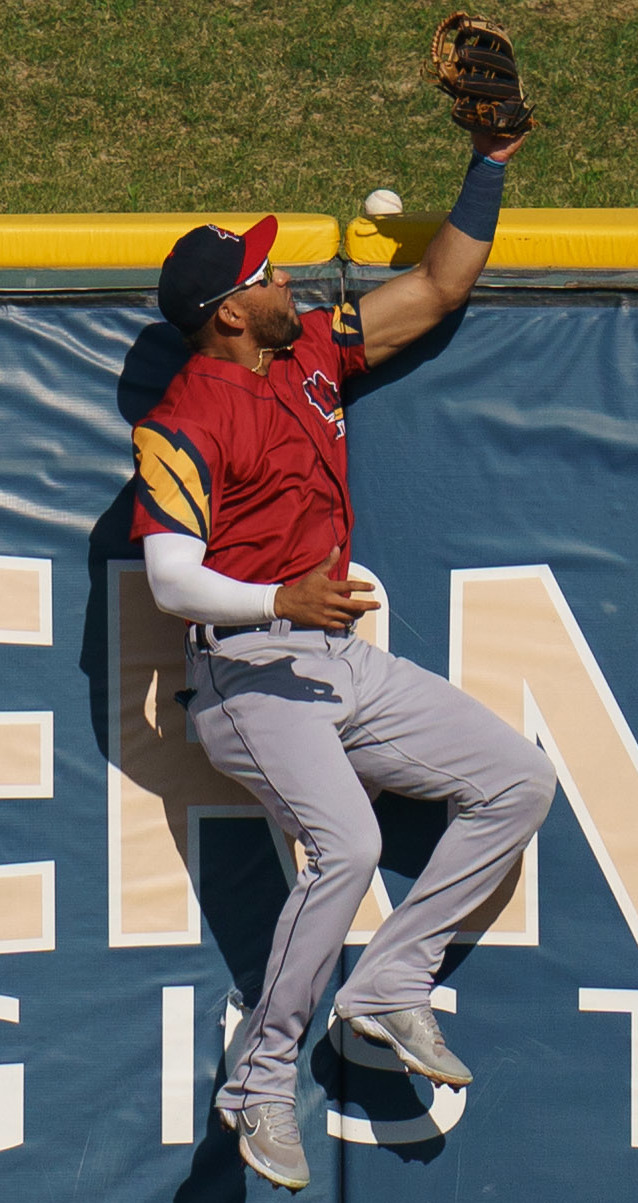
- Reyes with the Toledo Mud Hens in 2021

Lotte Giants – No. 29
- Outfielder
- Born: October 5, 1994 (age 32); Barcelona, Venezuela
- Bats: Switch Throws: Right

Professional debut
- MLB: April 1, 2018, for the Detroit Tigers
- KBO: March 23, 2024, for the Lotte Giants

MLB statistics (through 2022 season)
- Batting average: .264
- Home runs: 16
- Runs batted in: 107

KBO statistics (through August 21, 2026)
- Batting average: .345
- Home runs: 41
- Runs batted in: 297
- Stats at Baseball Reference

Teams
- Detroit Tigers (2018–2022); Lotte Giants (2024–present)

Career highlights and awards
- KBO Awards - Hit Award (2026)

Víctor José Reyes (born October 5, 1994) is a Venezuelan professional baseball outfielder for the Lotte Giants of the KBO League. He has previously played in Major League Baseball (MLB) for the Detroit Tigers. He made his MLB debut in 2018.

== Career ==
=== Atlanta Braves ===
The Atlanta Braves signed Reyes as an international free agent in July 2011. He made his professional debut in 2012 with the DSL Braves where he batted .296 with 33 runs batted in (RBIs) and 12 stolen bases in 52 games. He spent 2013 with both the Gulf Coast League Braves and Danville Braves, slashing .342/.387/.409 with 25 RBIs in 49 games, and 2014 with the Rome Braves where he compiled a .259 batting average with 34 RBIs in 89 games.

=== Arizona Diamondbacks ===
In April 2015, the Braves traded Reyes to the Arizona Diamondbacks for the 75th pick in the 2015 MLB draft. This draft pick was used by the Braves to select pitcher A.J. Minter.

Arizona assigned Reyes to the Kane County Cougars and he spent the whole season there, slashing .311/.343/.389 with two home runs and 59 RBIs in 121 games. In 2016, he played for the Visalia Rawhide where he batted .303 with six home runs and 54 RBIs in 124 games, and in 2017, he played with the Jackson Generals where he hit .292 with four home runs, 51 RBIs, 29 doubles, 59 runs scored, and 18 stolen bases. After the 2017 season, he played for the Salt River Rafters of the Arizona Fall League, where he hit .316 and scored eight runs and was selected to the Arizona Fall League's Rising Stars Team.

=== Detroit Tigers ===
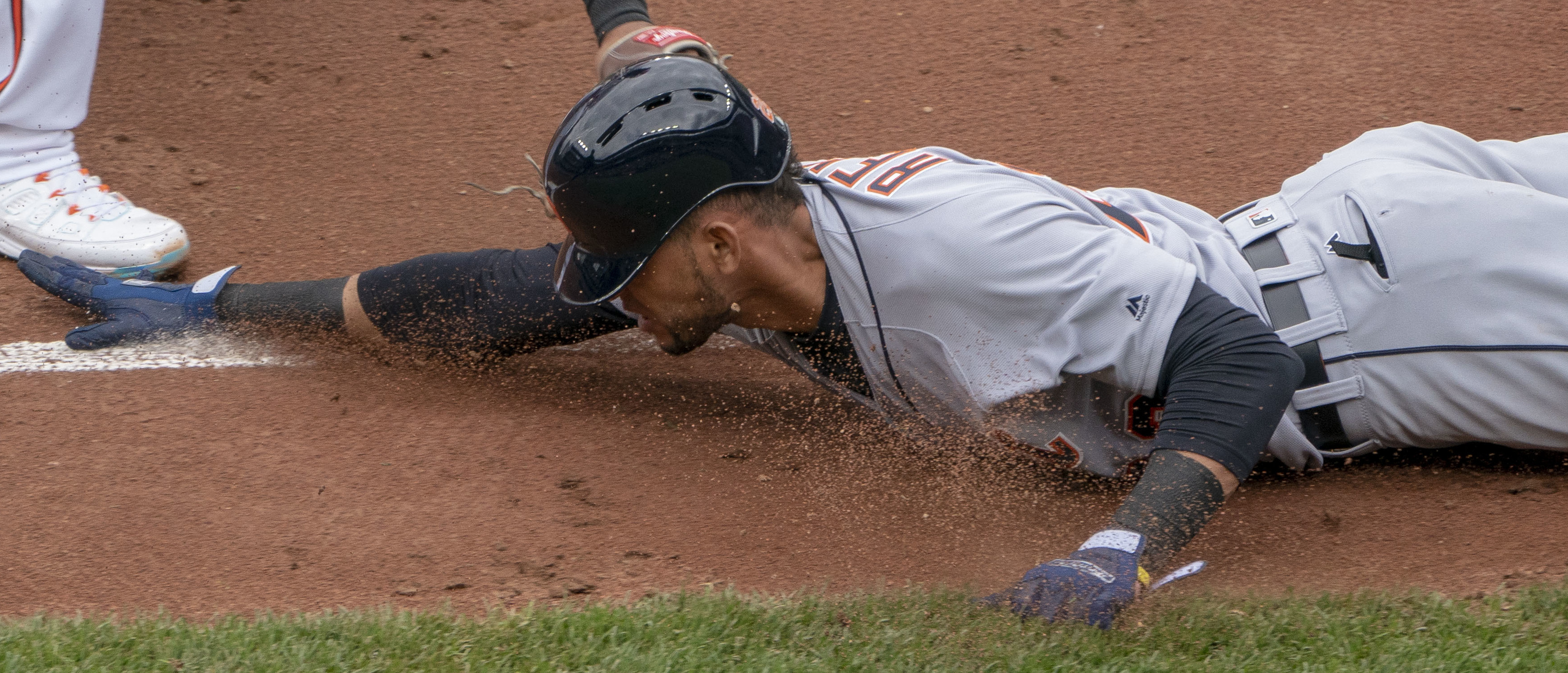
Reyes with the Tigers in 2018

On December 14, 2017, the Detroit Tigers selected Reyes from the Arizona Diamondbacks organization with the first selection of the Rule 5 draft. Reyes made the Tigers' 2018 Opening Day 25-man roster. Reyes made his major league debut with the Tigers on April 1, but left the game early after a spike cut his arm. Through the first half of the season, Reyes played sparingly, primarily serving as a pinch runner for Víctor Martínez or as a late-inning defensive replacement. Through the 2018 All-Star break, Reyes was hitting .221 in only 96 plate appearances. On September 2, Reyes hit his first career major league home run, a solo shot off Sonny Gray of the New York Yankees. Reyes also went 4-for-5 in the contest for his first career four-hit game. He would finish the 2018 season hitting .222 with 1 home run in 212 at-bats. He also stole 9 bases in 10 attempts.

On March 14, 2019, the Tigers optioned Reyes to the Triple-A Toledo Mud Hens to begin the season. After hitting .302 in Toledo with nine home runs and 55 RBI in 65 games, Reyes was recalled to the Tigers on July 4. In 276 at-bats for the Tigers, Reyes hit .304 with three home runs and 25 RBI.

In the shortened 2020 season, Reyes primarily batted leadoff for the Tigers. In 57 games, he hit .277 with four home runs and 14 RBI, while stealing eight bases in 10 attempts.

Reyes made the Tigers' 2021 Opening Day roster. On May 8, 2021, he was optioned to Triple-A Toledo after hitting just .143 in 63 at-bats. Reyes was recalled to the MLB roster on May 24. On August 27, Reyes hit a pinch-hit inside-the-park home run, becoming the first MLB player to do so since Tyler Saladino on May 14, 2018, and the first Tigers player to do since Ben Oglivie on June 2, 1976. In 76 games at the major league level in 2021, Reyes hit .258 with 5 home runs.

On March 22, 2022, the Tigers and Reyes agreed on a one-year contract worth $1.4 million, avoiding arbitration. He made 92 appearances for Detroit, slashing .254/.289/.362 with three home runs, 34 RBI, and two stolen bases. On November 10, the Tigers outrighted Reyes off the 40-man roster and Reyes rejected the outright assignment to the Triple–A Toledo Mud Hens, instead opting for free agency.

=== Chicago White Sox ===
On December 10, 2022, Reyes signed a minor league contract with the Chicago White Sox. He spent the 2023 season with the Triple–A Charlotte Knights, playing in 128 games and batting .279/.330/.462 with career–highs in home runs (20) and RBI (83). Reyes elected free agency following the season on November 6, 2023.

=== Lotte Giants ===
On December 16, 2023, Reyes signed a one–year, $950,000 contract with the Lotte Giants of the KBO League. In 144 games for the Giants, he slashed .352/.394/.511 with 15 home runs and 111 RBI, and set a KBO record with 202 hits.

On November 26, 2024, Reyes re–signed with the Giants on a $1 million contract. He made another 144 appearances for Lotte during the 2025 campaign, batting .326/.386/.475 with 13 home runs and 107 RBI.

On December 11, 2025, Reyes re-signed with the Giants on a one-year, $1.4 million contract.

== See also ==
- List of Major League Baseball players from Venezuela
- Rule 5 draft results
