= Daniel Stumpf =

American baseball player (born 1991)

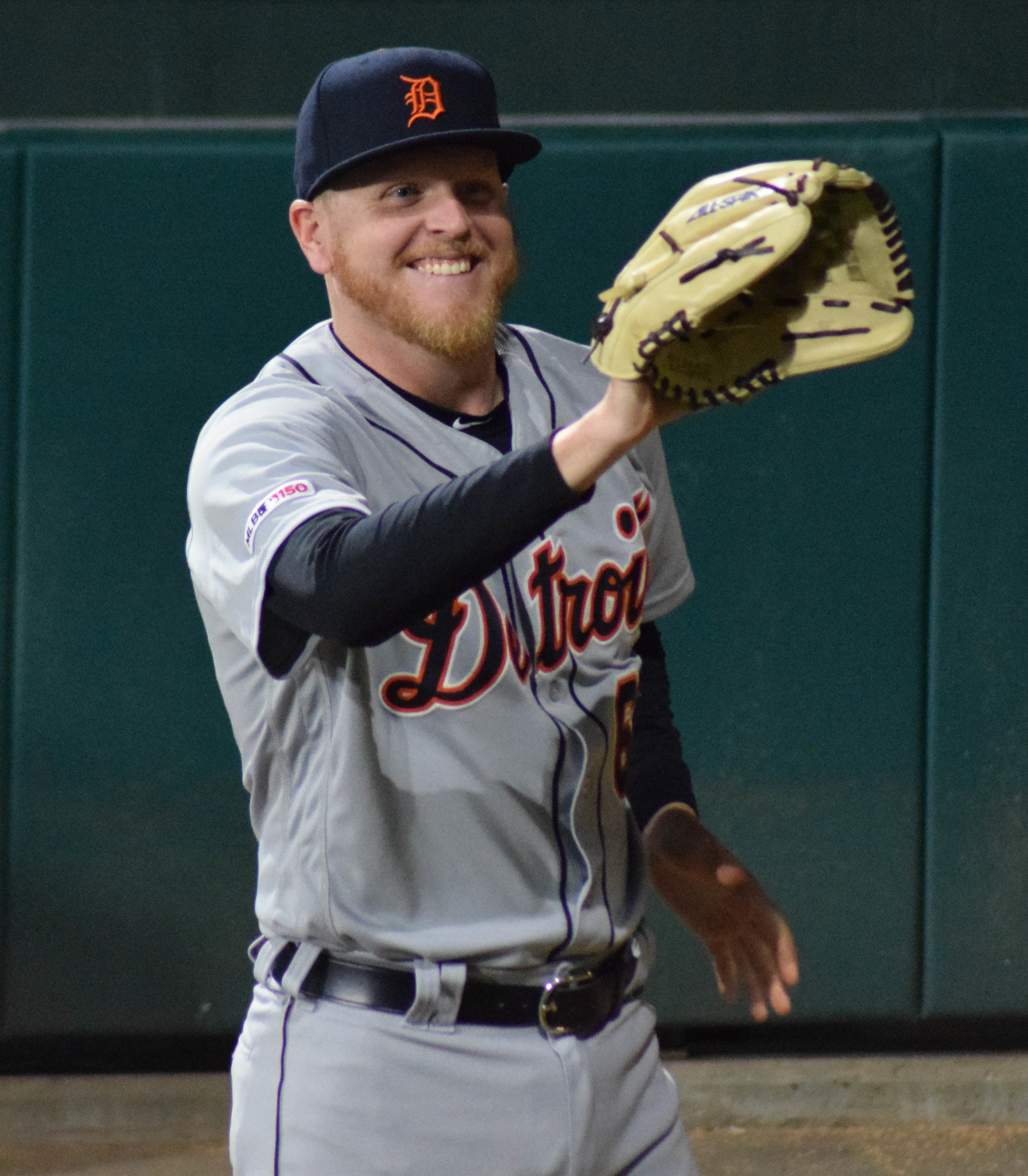
- Stumpf with the Tigers in 2019
- Pitcher
- Born: January 4, 1991 (age 35); Humble, Texas, U.S.
- Batted: Left Threw: Left

MLB debut
- April 7, 2016, for the Philadelphia Phillies

Last MLB appearance
- September 14, 2019, for the Detroit Tigers

MLB statistics
- Win–loss record: 2–7
- Earned run average: 4.66
- Strikeouts: 100
- Stats at Baseball Reference

Teams
- Philadelphia Phillies (2016); Detroit Tigers (2017–2019)

Daniel Arthur Stumpf (born January 4, 1991) is an American former professional baseball pitcher. He played in Major League Baseball (MLB) for the Philadelphia Phillies and Detroit Tigers.

== Career ==
Stumpf played college baseball at San Jacinto College. He was drafted by the Kansas City Royals in the 9th round of the 2012 Major League Baseball draft.

=== Philadelphia Phillies ===
==== 2016 ====
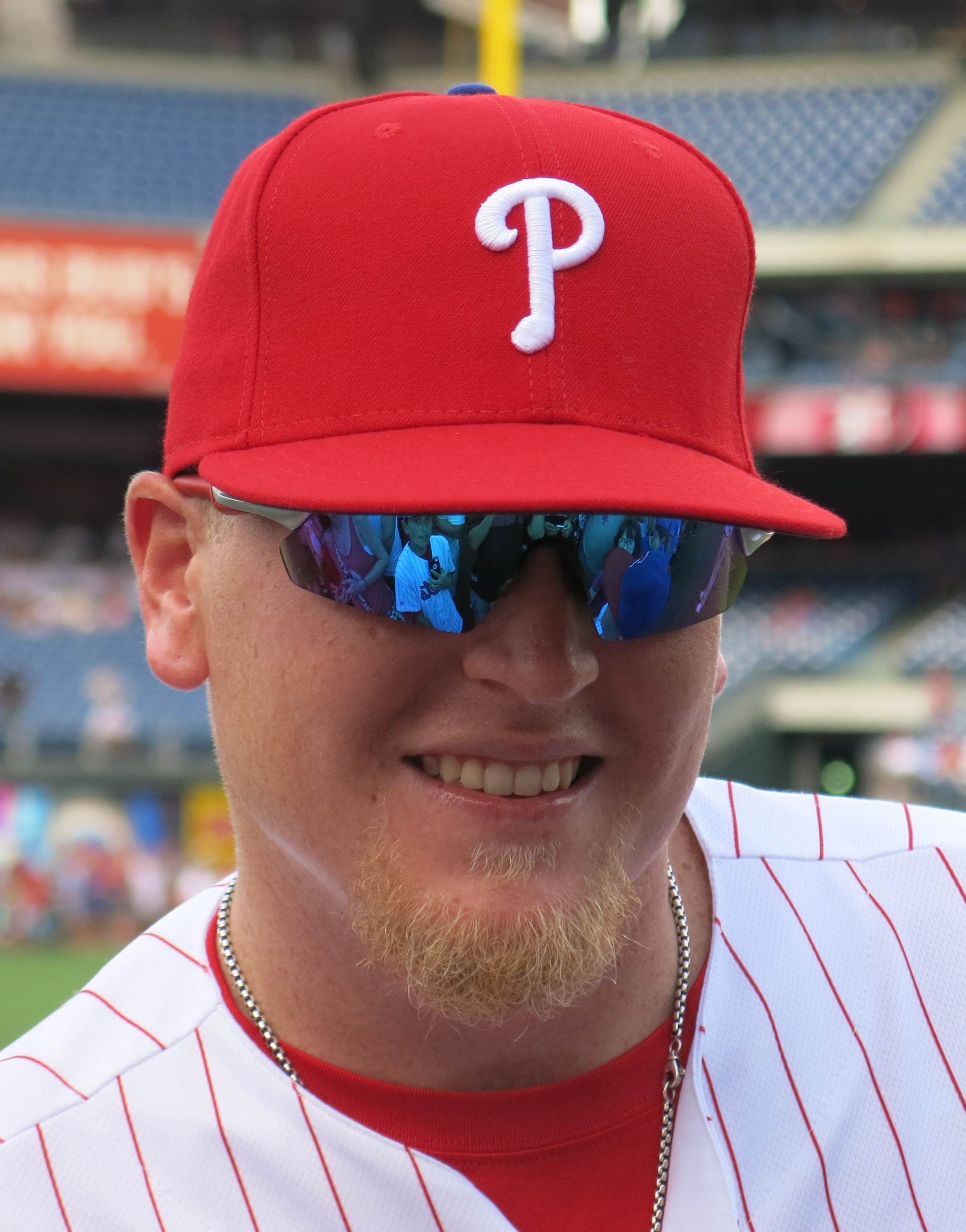
Stumpf with the Phillies in 2016

Stumpf was selected by the Philadelphia Phillies in the 2015 Rule 5 draft. Stumpf made the Phillies' 2016 Opening Day roster, and debuted in the major leagues on April 7. On April 14, 2016, Stumpf received an 80-game suspension from Major League Baseball for testing positive for having used the performance enhancing drug dehydrochlormethyltestosterone. He was designated for assignment by the Phillies on July 22. He was returned to the Royals three days later.

=== Detroit Tigers ===
==== 2017 ====
On December 8, 2016, Stumpf was selected by the Detroit Tigers in the 2016 Rule 5 draft. Because Stumpf had been selected in the Rule 5 draft and returned to the Royals once before, he was able to elect free agency after the Tigers placed him on waivers and he went unclaimed.

On April 1, 2017, Stumpf signed a Major League contract with the Tigers and was added to the 40 man roster. On June 2, 2017, Stumpf was recalled by the Detroit Tigers. Prior to being recalled, he posted a 1–2 record, with a 3.38 ERA and 26 strikeouts in 21 1/3 innings for the Triple-A Toledo Mud Hens. He made his Tiger debut in a June 3 game against the Chicago White Sox, allowing one hit and striking out one batter. Stumpf pitched 37 2/3 innings for the 2017 Tigers, striking out 33 and posting a 3.82 ERA.

==== 2018 ====
Stumpf began the 2018 season in the Tigers bullpen. He earned his first Major League win with a perfect 1 1/3 innings of relief in a victory over the Pittsburgh Pirates on April 25. In 38 1/3 relief innings over the 2018 season, Stumpf pitched to a 4.93 ERA with 37 strikeouts.

==== 2019 ====
Stumpf began the 2019 season in the Tigers bullpen. He was optioned to Triple–A Toledo on July 24 to make room for the recall of Drew VerHagen. Stumpf returned to the Tigers as a September call-up. He was used as a lefty specialist throughout the season, only pitching 29 innings in 48 games. Stumpf was outrighted off the Tigers roster and elected free agency on October 24, 2019.

== Pitching coach controversy ==
On June 27, 2018, Tigers pitching coach Chris Bosio was fired due to racially insensitive comments. Bosio would claim that the offending comment was referring to Stumpf as "Spider Monkey" due to the faces he would make while lifting weights, which was overheard by an African American clubhouse attendant. However, Stumpf would say on the matter, "Spider Monkey is not a nickname I have been called or I'm familiar with," and four additional sources who spoke to The Athletic disputed Bosio's version of events.

== See also ==
- Rule 5 draft results
- List of Major League Baseball players suspended for performance-enhancing drugs
