= Christin Stewart =

American baseball player (born 1993)

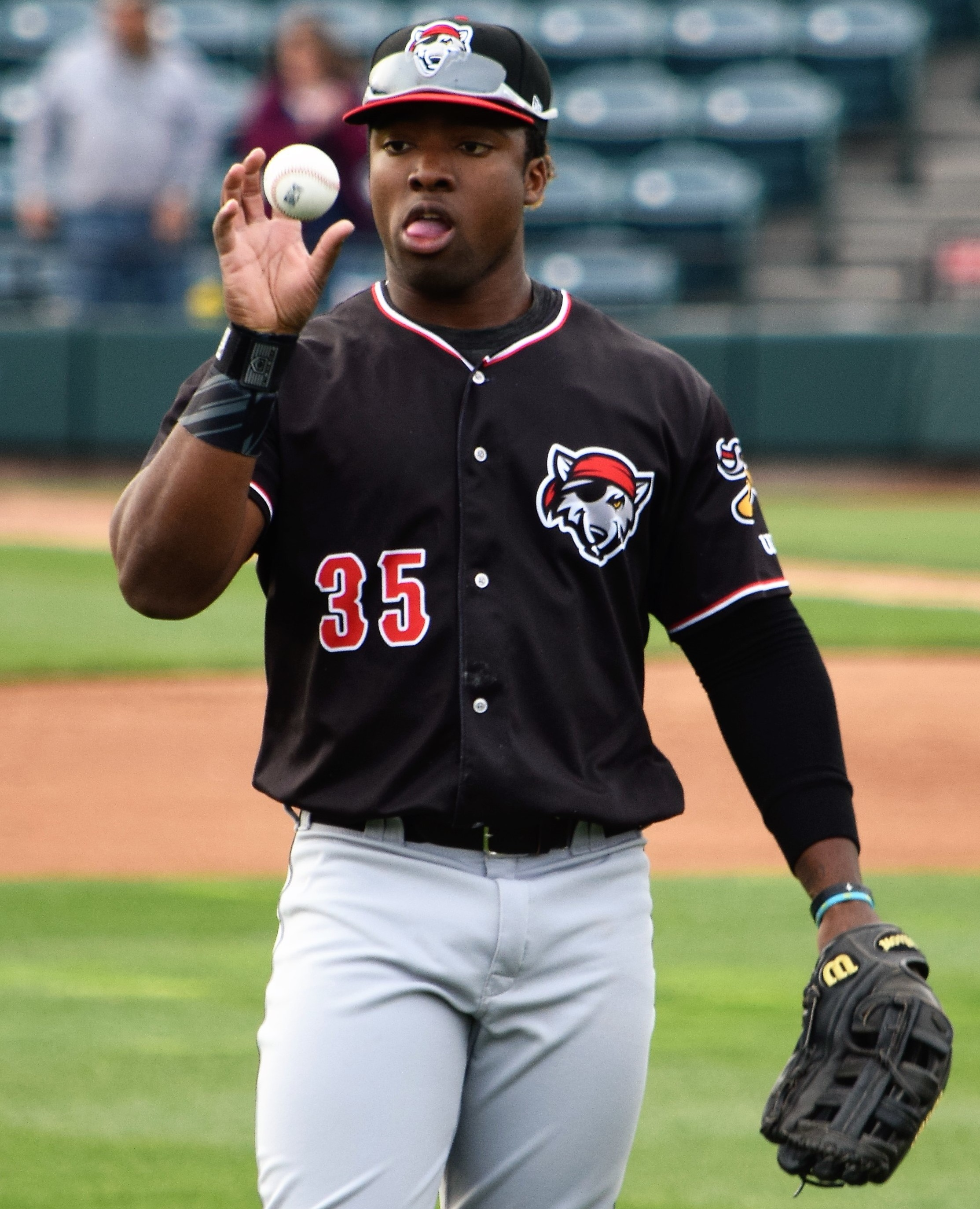
- Stewart with the Erie SeaWolves in 2017
- Outfielder
- Born: December 10, 1993 (age 32); Atlanta, Georgia, U.S.
- Batted: Left Threw: Right

MLB debut
- September 9, 2018, for the Detroit Tigers

Last MLB appearance
- September 27, 2020, for the Detroit Tigers

MLB statistics
- Batting average: .225
- Home runs: 15
- Runs batted in: 59
- Stats at Baseball Reference

Teams
- Detroit Tigers (2018–2020)

Christin Gaylin Harris Stewart (born December 10, 1993) is an American former professional baseball outfielder. He played college baseball for the University of Tennessee, and played in Major League Baseball (MLB) for the Detroit Tigers. The Tigers drafted him in the 34th overall in the first round of the 2015 Major League Baseball draft. Baseball America wrote that he has a "physical frame and produces above-average bat speed (that) combined with the natural leverage in his swing, translates into plus raw power".

== Amateur career ==
Stewart attended Providence Christian Academy in Lilburn, Georgia, where he hit 69 home runs throughout his high school baseball career, which is tied with Micah Owings for most in Georgia history. He hit 26 home runs as a junior, setting a Georgia state single-season record.

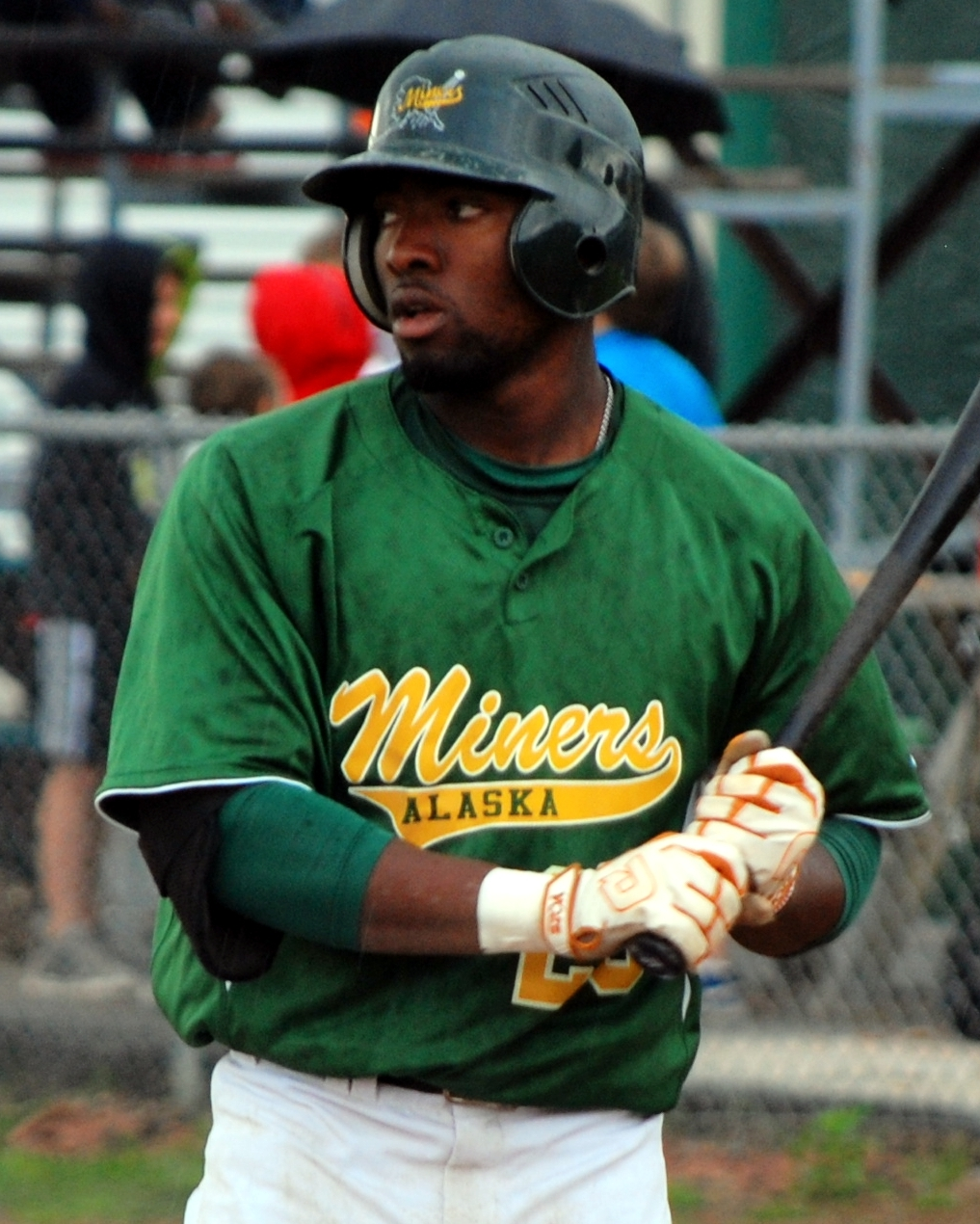
Stewart with the Mat-Su Miners in 2013

Stewart enrolled at the University of Tennessee and played college baseball for the Tennessee Volunteers. During three seasons at Tennessee, Stewart batted .319 with a .962 on-base plus slugging. In 2014, he played collegiate summer baseball with the Orleans Firebirds of the Cape Cod Baseball League. During the 2015 season, he batted .311, hit 15 home runs, and recorded 47 runs batted in (RBIs) in 50 games.

== Professional career ==
=== Detroit Tigers ===
==== Minor leagues (2015–2018) ====
The Detroit Tigers selected Stewart with the 34th overall pick of the 2015 MLB draft as compensatory pick they received after losing Max Scherzer as a free agent during the previous off-season. He was the second player drafted by Tigers in the first round of the draft, after Beau Burrows. Stewart signed with the Tigers, and spent the 2015 season with GCL Tigers, Connecticut Tigers, and West Michigan Whitecaps, posting a combined .285 batting average with ten home runs and 44 RBIs in 71 total games between the three clubs.

Stewart started the 2016 season with the Lakeland Flying Tigers and was later promoted to the Erie SeaWolves; he posted a combined .255 batting average with 30 home runs and 87 RBIs between both teams. During the 2016 season, he played in the All-Star Futures Game. His homer total tied him for fifth among all Minor Leaguers in all organizations, while his 24 home runs, .534 slugging percentage and .924 OPS in 104 games at Lakeland led the Florida State League. He was named the Tigers Minor League Player of the Year.

Stewart returned to Erie in 2017 and spent the whole season there, compiling a .256 batting average with 28 home runs and 86 RBIs in 136 games. He was named the Tigers Minor League Player of the Year for the second year straight.

Stewart started the 2018 season with Tigers' Triple–A affiliate, the Toledo Mud Hens.

==== Major leagues ====
The Tigers promoted Stewart to the major leagues on September 9, 2018, and he made his major league debut that day as a pinch-hitter. On September 10, Stewart got his first major league hit, a single off former Tiger Justin Verlander.

On September 20, Stewart hit his first two major league home runs in his first two at-bats against the Kansas City Royals and had six RBI in the game. It was the first time a Tiger player hit his first two major league home runs in the same game since Brent Clevlen in 2006, the first time a Tiger rookie had a six-RBI game since Ryan Raburn had a seven-RBI game in 2007, and the first time since 1908 that a Tiger player had a six-RBI game within his first 11 contests. With the Tigers for the season he batted .267/.375/.417.

Stewart won the starting left field job for the 2019 Tigers, and hit a game-winning home run on opening day, March 28, against the Toronto Blue Jays. He hit his first career grand slam on April 6 against the Kansas City Royals, which also proved to be the game winner in the Tigers 7–4 victory. Stewart completed his 2019 season hitting .233/.305/.388 with 10 home runs and 40 RBI in 369 at-bats.

Stewart started in left field for the Tigers in 2020. On September 9 he was optioned down to the alternate training site after hitting .171. The training site was created during the COVID-19-shortened 2020 season due to the minor league season being canceled. He batted .167/.225/.300 for the season.

On April 1, 2021, Stewart was designated for assignment by the Tigers after Derek Holland was added to the roster. On April 6, Stewart cleared waivers and was outrighted to the alternate training site. With the Toledo Mud Hens he batted .254/.339/.538. On November 9, Stewart declined his minor league assignment and became a free agent.

=== Boston Red Sox ===
On November 30, 2021, Stewart signed a minor league contract with the Boston Red Sox. He played in 103 games for the Triple–A Worcester Red Sox, hitting .237/.364/.450 with 19 home runs, 55 RBI, and 9 stolen bases. Stewart elected free agency following the season on November 10, 2022.

=== Toros de Tijuana ===
On February 2, 2024, Stewart signed with the Toros de Tijuana of the Mexican League. Stewart was released and became a free agent.
