= Artie Lewicki =

American baseball player (born 1992)

- Pitcher
- Born: April 8, 1992 (age 34); Wyckoff, New Jersey, U.S.
- Batted: Right Threw: Right

Professional debut
- MLB: September 4, 2017, for the Detroit Tigers
- KBO: April 4, 2021, for the SSG Landers

Last appearance
- MLB: September 5, 2020, for the Arizona Diamdondbacks
- KBO: May 29, 2021, for the SSG Landers

MLB statistics
- Win–loss record: 0–3
- Earned run average: 5.16
- Strikeouts: 41

KBO statistics
- Win–loss record: 1-0
- Earned run average: 3.77
- Strikeouts: 9
- Stats at Baseball Reference

Teams
- Detroit Tigers (2017–2018); Arizona Diamondbacks (2020); SSG Landers (2021)

Arthur Michael Lewicki (born April 8, 1992) is an American former professional baseball pitcher. He played in Major League Baseball (MLB) for the Detroit Tigers and Arizona Diamondbacks and in the KBO League for the SSG Landers.

== Career ==
A native of Wyckoff, New Jersey, Lewicki attended Saint Joseph Regional High School. After graduating from high school, Lewicki played college baseball at the University of Virginia. In 2012, Lewicki pitched for the Keene Swamp Bats of the New England Collegiate Baseball League. He also played one season for the Oneonta Outlaws of the NYCBBL.

=== Detroit Tigers ===
Lewicki was drafted by the Detroit Tigers in the eighth round of the 2014 Major League Baseball draft and signed.

After signing, the Tigers assigned him to the GCL Tigers and he was later promoted to the West Michigan Whitecaps. In 12 games (one start) between the two teams, he was 2–2 with a 2.28 ERA. In 2015, he played for West Michigan where he compiled a 3–4 record and 3.52 ERA in 15 starts, and in 2016, he pitched for both the Lakeland Flying Tigers and Erie SeaWolves where he pitched to a combined 3–8 record and 3.44 ERA in 17 games (15 starts). He began 2017 with Erie and was promoted to the Toledo Mud Hens in August.

The Tigers purchased Lewicki's contract on September 3, 2017, and he made his MLB debut the next day in the starting rotation. Prior to being called up, he was 14–4 with a 3.38 ERA and 1.18 WHIP in 25 starts between Erie and Toledo.

Lewicki began 2018 with Toledo. He was again called up on April 25, 2018, ahead of a doubleheader as the 26th man, but was sent back down the next day. He was recalled once again on May 16. Lewicki spent time in the bullpen before returning to the rotation following the DFA of Jacob Turner. Lewicki's second career start, and first of the season, resulted in allowing three earned runs on six hits over four and two-thirds innings, resulting in a no-decision.

The Tigers announced on August 23 that Lewicki would undergo Tommy John surgery during the last week of August, and will miss the entire 2019 season. For the 2018 season, he appeared in 13 games and pitched 38 2/3 innings, striking out 30 and posting a 4.89 ERA.

=== Arizona Diamondbacks ===
On October 24, 2018, Lewicki was claimed off waivers by the Arizona Diamondbacks. He was outrighted off of the roster on November 20. Lewicki had his contract selected to the active roster by the Diamondbacks on September 1, 2020. Lewicki was released by the team on October 21, 2020, to pursue an opportunity in Asia.

=== SK Wyverns/SSG Landers ===
On October 31, 2020, Lewicki signed a one-year, $750,000 deal with the SK Wyverns of the KBO League.
