= Jairo Labourt =

Dominican baseball player (born 1994)

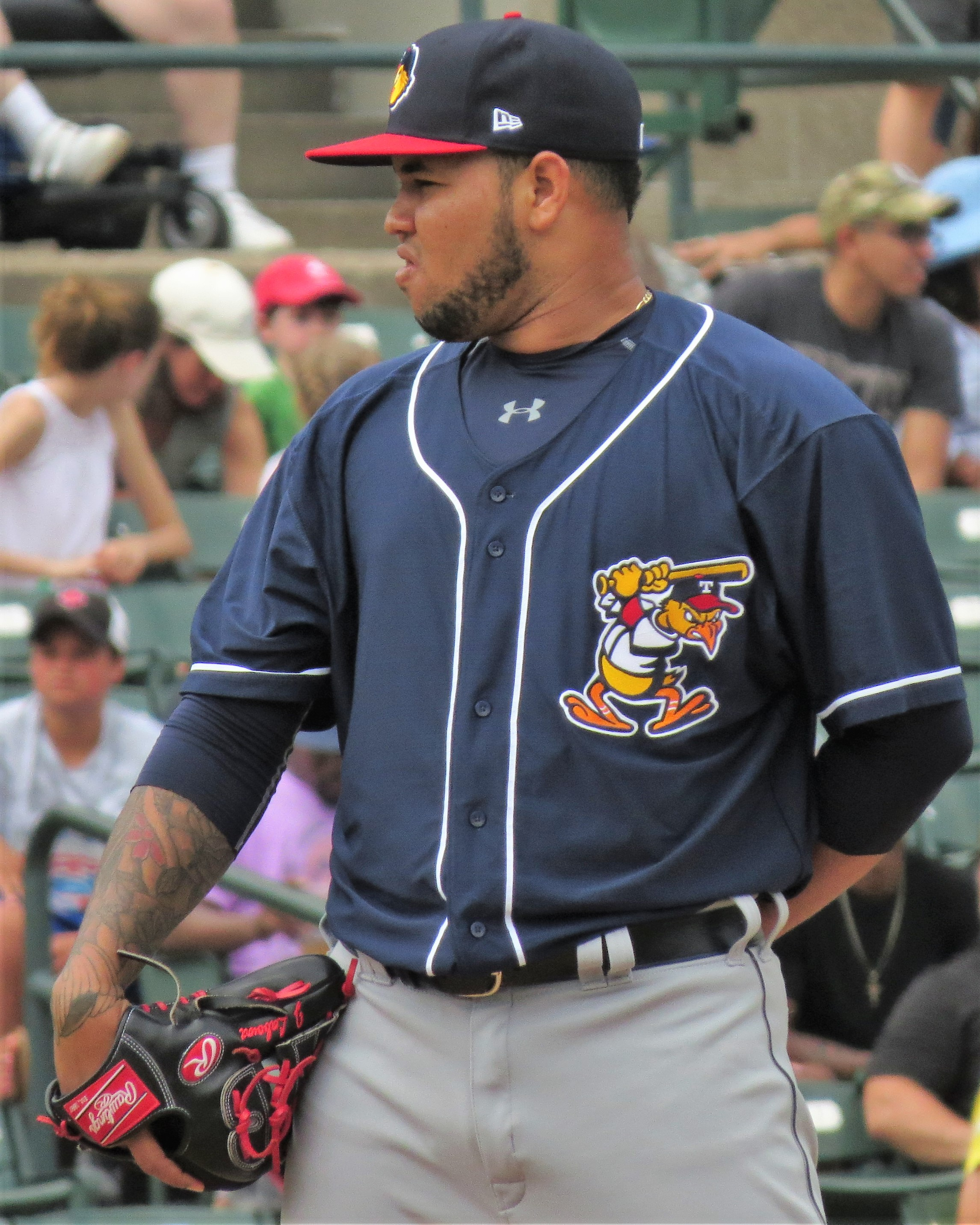
- Labourt with the Toledo Mud Hens in 2017

Free agent
- Pitcher
- Born: March 7, 1994 (age 31); Azua, Azua, Dominican Republic
- Bats: Left Throws: Left

MLB debut
- September 1, 2017, for the Detroit Tigers

MLB statistics (through 2017 season)
- Win–loss record: 0–0
- Earned run average: 4.50
- Strikeouts: 4

Teams
- Detroit Tigers (2017)

Jairo Snaider Labourt (born March 7, 1994) is a Dominican professional baseball pitcher who is a free agent. He has previously played in Major League Baseball (MLB) for the Detroit Tigers.

== Career ==
=== Toronto Blue Jays ===
Labourt signed with the Toronto Blue Jays as an international free agent for $350,000 in August 2011. He made 12 starts for the Dominican Summer League Blue Jays in 2011, and posted a 0–4 record with a 2.23 earned run average in 36 1/3 innings. Labourt played the 2012 season with the Gulf Coast League Blue Jays and went 0–3 with a 3.79 ERA over 12 starts totalling 38 innings. Continuing his rise through the minor league system, he played all of 2013 with the Bluefield Blue Jays and earned his first professional win, finishing the season with a 2–2 record and an impressive 1.92 ERA over 51 2/3 innings. Labourt began the 2014 season with the Class-A Lansing Lugnuts, where he struggled in his 6 appearances (3 starts) and pitched to a 6.43 ERA and 11 strikeouts in 14 innings. He was then reassigned to the Low-A Vancouver Canadians and made 15 starts for the team, posting a 5–3 record with a 1.77 ERA and 82 strikeouts in 71 1/3 innings. His 1.77 ERA was the lowest mark in the Northwest League, earning him the 2014 ERA title. On October 1, Labourt was named the number 3 prospect in the Northwest League by Baseball America.

=== Detroit Tigers ===
On July 30, 2015, the Blue Jays traded Labourt, Daniel Norris, and Matt Boyd to the Detroit Tigers in exchange for David Price. Labourt was assigned to the Dunedin Blue Jays prior to the trade. The Tigers added him to their 40-man roster after the season.

Labourt made his major league debut with the Tigers on September 1, 2017. The Tigers designated him for assignment in February 2018.

On March 2, 2018, Labourt was claimed off waivers by the Cincinnati Reds. Two days later, he was claimed off waivers by the Oakland Athletics before being again designated for assignment on March 12 and then released on March 14. He returned to the Tigers organization when he signed a minor league contract with them on March 28. After being sent to extended spring training, the Tigers released Labourt on May 22, 2018.

=== Chicago White Sox ===
On May 29, 2018, Labourt signed a minor league contract with the Chicago White Sox. He made 5 appearances for the rookie–level Dominican Summer League White Sox, posting a 4.76 ERA with 11 strikeouts across 5 2/3 innings pitched. Labourt was released by the White Sox organization on July 2.

On December 19, 2018, Labourt signed a minor league contract with the Tampa Bay Rays. He was released on March 27, 2019.

=== Sioux City Explorers ===
On February 5, 2020, Labourt signed with the Sioux City Explorers of the American Association. However, the team was not selected by the league to compete in the condensed 2020 season due to the COVID-19 pandemic. Labourt was not chosen by another team in the dispersal draft, and therefore became a free agent. On November 10, 2020, Labourt returned to the Explorers, and signed with them for the 2021 season. Labourt was released by the team following the season on November 11, 2021.

=== Staten Island FerryHawks ===
On February 6, 2024, Labourt signed with the Staten Island FerryHawks of the Atlantic League of Professional Baseball. However, prior to the start of the season on April 24, Labourt was released by Staten Island.
