= Blaine Hardy =

American baseball pitcher (born 1987)

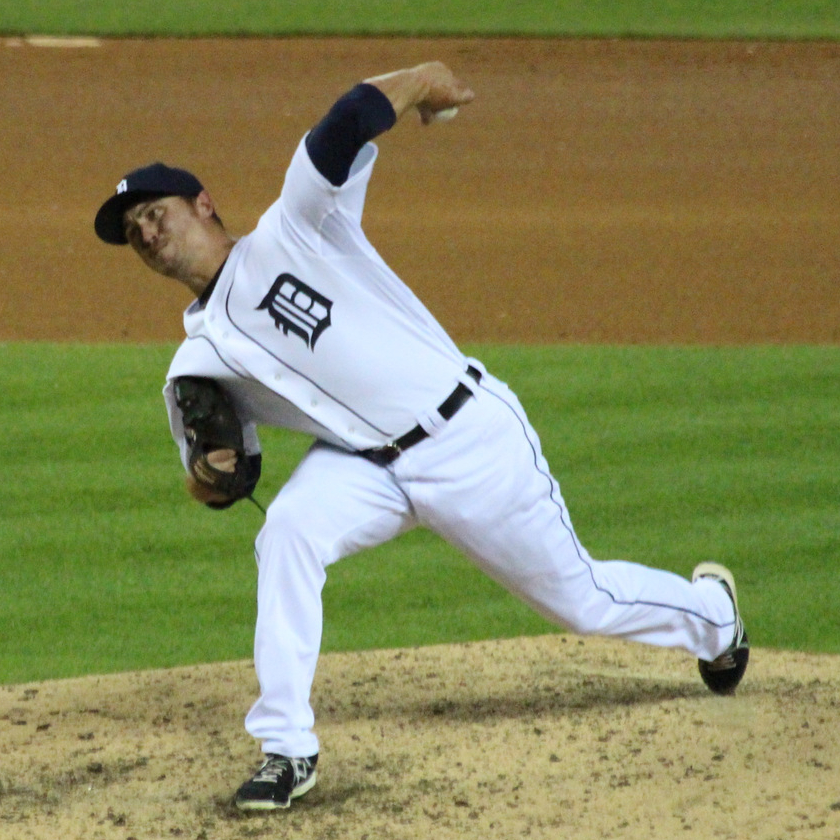
- Hardy with the Detroit Tigers
- Pitcher
- Born: March 14, 1987 (age 39); Seattle, Washington, U.S.
- Batted: Left Threw: Left

MLB debut
- June 16, 2014, for the Detroit Tigers

Last MLB appearance
- August 3, 2021, for the Milwaukee Brewers

MLB statistics
- Win–loss record: 14–11
- Earned run average: 3.78
- Strikeouts: 230
- Stats at Baseball Reference

Teams
- Detroit Tigers (2014–2019); Milwaukee Brewers (2021)

Blaine Patrick Hardy (born March 14, 1987) is an American former professional baseball pitcher. He played in Major League Baseball (MLB) for the Detroit Tigers and Milwaukee Brewers.

== College career ==
Hardy attended Edmonds-Woodway High School in Edmonds, Washington, graduating in 2005. He then enrolled at the University of Portland in 2006 where he played for the school's college baseball team. Hardy then transferred to Bellevue College for the 2007 season, and would go on to play for Lewis–Clark State College in 2008. Hardy was a member of the Lewis–Clark National Association of Intercollegiate Athletics World Series championship team in 2008.

In 2008, Hardy played collegiate summer baseball for the Thunder Bay Border Cats of the Northwoods League.

== Professional career ==
=== Kansas City Royals ===
The Kansas City Royals selected Hardy in the 22nd round of the 2008 MLB draft. In 2009, Hardy appeared with the Double-A Northwest Arkansas Naturals and Triple-A Omaha Royals. In 2011, Hardy was invited to Spring Training, but did not make the club and was assigned to the Triple-A Omaha Storm Chasers, and split the season between Omaha and Northwest Arkansas. In 2012, Hardy split the season again between the Storm Chasers and Naturals before being released during spring training on March 21, 2013.

=== Detroit Tigers ===
Hardy signed with the Detroit Tigers in April 2013, and they assigned him to the Erie SeaWolves of the Class AA Eastern League. Hardy finished with a 2–2 record and a 1.63 earned run average (ERA) as a reliever before he was promoted to the Toledo Mud Hens of the Class AAA International League. He was pressed into duty as a starting pitcher due to a pitching shortage and performed well. He finished the season with an 8–3 record and a 1.67 ERA between Double-A Erie and Triple-A Toledo.

==== 2014 ====
Hardy was a non-roster invitee to spring training in 2014, and impressed as he competed for a role as the team's long reliever. The Tigers reassigned him to minor league camp towards the end of spring training. On June 15, 2014, the Detroit Tigers purchased Hardy's contract from Triple-A Toledo, and he was added to the 25-man roster. Hardy made his major league debut for the Detroit Tigers the next day in a game against the Kansas City Royals, pitching two scoreless innings, allowing one hit, walking two and striking out two. He performed well in his first major league season, posting a 2.54 ERA in 39 innings pitched.

==== 2015 ====
Hardy made the Tiger roster for Opening Day in the 2015 season, but was held back for extended spring training due to a minor injury. On August 23, 2015, Hardy's homerless streak of 84 2/3 innings ended after allowing a home run to Mike Napoli. This was the longest active homerless innings streak in the major leagues. The last time Hardy had allowed a home run was to Jason Castro on June 27, 2014. Hardy holds the franchise record for the most appearances by a left-hander without allowing a home run, at 87, and was two appearances away from tying Bernie Boland's record for 89 homerless appearances. He would finish the season with a 3.08 ERA, while striking out 55 batters in 61 1/3 innings. He appeared in a team-high 70 games in 2015.

==== 2016 ====
On May 12, 2016, Hardy was optioned to the Triple-A Toledo Mud Hens. He made seven appearances between June 6 and 18 before being optioned to Toledo again. He was called up to the Tigers again in August, and pitched three scoreless innings of an August 9 game against the Seattle Mariners. For the 2016 season, Hardy made 21 relief appearances, posting a 1–0 record with a 3.51 ERA in 25 2/3 innings pitched.

==== 2017 ====
Hardy again split time between Toledo and Detroit in 2017. He struggled with the Tigers this season, posting a 5.94 ERA and 1.77 WHIP while striking out 28 batters in 33 1/3 innings. On November 25, 2017, the Tigers avoided arbitration with Hardy, agreeing on a one-year contract.

==== 2018 ====
On March 25, 2018, Hardy was outrighted to Triple-A Toledo by the Tigers. On May 4, 2018, the Tigers purchased Hardy's minor league contract and added him to the roster. Hardy made his first major league start on May 13, giving up two earned runs in 4 1/3 innings against the Seattle Mariners, while throwing a career-high 79 pitches. In his third start on May 27, Hardy went a career-high seven innings and threw 85 pitches, giving up just one run and three hits against the Chicago White Sox to earn his first major league win as a starter. Due to injuries to Francisco Liriano and Jordan Zimmermann, Hardy continued to pitch in the Tigers starting rotation through the month of June. He made seven total starts, going 3–1 with a 3.66 ERA in those games, before returning to the bullpen on July 1. He earned his first major league save on July 2 against the Toronto Blue Jays. Back in the rotation on August 3, Hardy took a no-hitter against the Oakland Athletics into the seventh inning, before an infield single by Jed Lowrie ruined the no-hit bid. He finished the game allowing one hit, with two walks and six strikeouts on a career-high 106 pitches. On August 17, Hardy was placed on the 10-day disabled list due to elbow tendinitis.

For the 2018 season, Hardy appeared in 30 games (13 starts), compiling a 4–5 record, 3.56 ERA, 1.17 WHIP, and 66 strikeouts in 86 innings.

==== 2019 ====
On January 11, 2019, the Tigers avoided arbitration with Hardy, agreeing on a one-year, $1.3 million contract. Despite having pitched in 194 games for the Tigers over five seasons, 2019 marked the first time in his career that Hardy was with the team for an opening day. After putting up a 4.47 ERA in 44 1/3 innings in 2019, mostly with elbow pain, Hardy was optioned to the Toledo Mud Hens on August 9. Hardy opted to receive PRP injections to treat his elbow on August 13 after seeking a second opinion during the 72-hour window to report to Toledo. Hardy was then placed on the 60-day injured list which ended his season. His option was rescinded since he had his elbow treated prior to reporting to his minor league assignment. Hardy was outrighted off the Tigers roster and elected free agency on October 24, 2019.

=== Minnesota Twins ===
On February 2, 2019, Hardy signed a minor league contract with the Minnesota Twins. On March 27, 2020, it was announced that Hardy underwent Tommy John surgery, ending his 2020 season before it began. He became a free agent on November 2.

=== Milwaukee Brewers ===
On January 28, 2021, Hardy signed a minor league contract with the Milwaukee Brewers organization and was invited to Spring Training. He was assigned to the Triple-A Nashville Sounds to begin the season.

On August 1, 2021, Hardy's contract was selected by the Brewers. Hardy was returned to Triple-A Nashville on August 9, after allowing 2 runs in his only inning of work. He elected free agency following the season on November 7.

=== Sioux City Explorers ===
On April 14, 2022, Hardy signed with the Sioux City Explorers of the American Association of Professional Baseball. Hardy made 23 appearances (3 starts) for Sioux City in 2022, recording a 3–2 record and 4.78 ERA with 51 strikeouts in 52 2/3 innings pitched. He was released following the season on October 10.

== Coaching career ==
On February 27, 2023, Hardy was announced as the head baseball coach at Central Lakes College in Brainerd, Minnesota.

== Pitch selection ==
Hardy throws a fastball in the 87–91 mph range that he will occasionally cut for late movement. His most effective pitch is an upper-70s curveball, which has yielded most of his strikeouts to date. He mixes in a changeup at 78–81 mph.
