= Bonifacio (name) =

Notable people named Bonifacio include:

- Bonifacio Angius (born 1982), Italian filmmaker
- Bonifacio Flores Arévalo (1850–1920), Filipino dentist, sculptor and ardent patron of music and theater
- Bonifacio Asioli (1769–1832), Italian composer of classical and church music
- Bonifacio Ávila (1950–2026), Colombian boxer
- Bonifacio Bembo (fl. between 1447 and 1477), Italian painter and miniaturist of the early Renaissance
- Bonifacio de Blas y Muñoz (1827–1880), Spanish politician, lawyer and Minister of State
- Bonifacio or Bonifaci Calvo (fl. 1253–1266), Genoese troubadour
- Bonifacio del Carril (1911–1994), Argentine writer, lawyer, diplomat, Foreign Minister in 1962, and historian
- Bonifacio Custodio, better known as Bonbon Custodio (born 1982), Filipino basketball player
- Bonifacio Ondó Edu (1922–1969), Prime Minister of Equatorial Guinea while it was still under Spanish colonial rule
- Bonifacio Ferrero (1476–1543), Italian Roman Catholic bishop and cardinal
- Bonifacio Herrera (born 1961), Mexican politician
- Bonifacio Pinedo (1888–1954), King of the Afro-Bolivian monarchy
- AC Bonifacio (born 2002), Canadian-Filipino dancer, actress, and singer
- Andrés Bonifacio (1863–1897), Filipino revolutionary leader
- Bruno Bonifacio (born 1994), Brazilian racing driver
- Domingos Bonifácio (born 1984), Angolan basketball player
- Édson Bonifácio (born 1964), Brazilian footballer
- Édson Gomes Bonifácio (born 1956), Brazilian footballer
- Emilio Bonifacio (born 1985), Major League Baseball player
- Francesco Bonifacio (1912–1946), beatified Italian Catholic priest killed by Yugoslav communists
- Francesco Paolo Bonifacio (1923–1989), Italian politician and jurist, Minister of Justice and President of the Constitutional Court of Italy
- José Bonifácio de Andrada (1763–1838), Brazilian statesman, naturalist, professor and poet
- José Bonifácio the Younger (1827–1886), French-born Brazilian poet, teacher and senator, grand-nephew of the above
- Jorge Bonifacio (born 1993), Major League Baseball player in the Kansas City Royals system
- Leonardo Augusto Bonifácio (born 1983), Brazilian footballer
- Natale Bonifacio (1538–1592/1538–1592), maker of engravings and woodcuts in Rome
- Procopio Bonifacio (1873–1897), Filipino revolutionary for independence from Spain; younger brother of Andrés Bonifacio
