= 2020 Detroit Tigers season =

Major League Baseball season

2020 Detroit Tigers
- League: American League
- Division: Central
- Ballpark: Comerica Park
- City: Detroit, Michigan
- Record: 23–35 (.397)
- Divisional place: 5th
- Owners: Christopher Ilitch; Ilitch family trust
- General managers: Al Avila
- Managers: Ron Gardenhire (until September 19); Lloyd McClendon (as of September 19)
- Television: Fox Sports Detroit (Matt Shepard, Kirk Gibson, Jack Morris)
- Radio: Detroit Tigers Radio Network (Dan Dickerson, Jim Price)
- Stats: ESPN.com; Baseball Reference

The 2020 Detroit Tigers season was the team's 120th season. This was the team's third and final year under manager Ron Gardenhire, and their 21st at Comerica Park. The start of season was delayed by four months due to the COVID-19 pandemic. The Tigers finished the season with a 23–35 record, ranking last in their division and third-worst in the major leagues, and missed the playoffs for the sixth consecutive season. For the second straight season, the Tigers pitching staff compiled the MLB's worst team ERA (6.37).

The Tigers franchise experienced a major loss on April 6 when Hall of Famer Al Kaline died at the age of 85. Nicknamed "Mr. Tiger," Kaline had been affiliated with the team for 67 years in various roles: first as a player, then as a broadcaster, and most recently, as an executive. The Tigers wore a No. 6 patch this season to honor him.

On September 19, manager Ron Gardenhire announced his retirement from baseball effective immediately, due to recent health concerns including stress, a bout with prostate cancer, and a stomach virus due to food poisoning. Bench coach Lloyd McClendon was named interim manager for the remainder of the season.

== Impact of the COVID-19 pandemic ==
On March 12, 2020, MLB announced that because of the ongoing COVID-19 pandemic, the start of the regular season would be delayed by at least two weeks in addition to the remainder of spring training being cancelled. Four days later, it was announced that the start of the season would be pushed back indefinitely due to the recommendation made by the CDC to restrict events of more than 50 people for eight weeks.

On June 23, commissioner Rob Manfred unilaterally implemented a 60-game season. Players reported to training camps at their regular season home stadiums on July 1 in order to resume spring training, which included only inter-squad games, and prepare for a July 23 or 24 Opening Day. In an effort to slow the spread of the virus, teams only played their own division and the opposite league's corresponding geographical division, e.g. the Tigers only played American League Central (40 games total) and National League Central (20 games total) opponents. Games were played behind closed doors, with artificial crowd noise played over loud speakers.

On June 24, two members of the Tigers organization (later identified as pitcher Daniel Norris and a coach) tested positive for COVID-19. Norris was later cleared to join the Opening Day roster.

The Tigers' August 3–6 series against the St. Louis Cardinals was postponed several times after 17 of the latter's members tested positive for COVID-19. Two of the games were eventually canceled outright.

== Roster moves ==
=== Coaching staff ===
- On September 30, 2019, the Tigers named Lloyd McClendon as bench coach, Joe Vavra as hitting coach, Dave Clark as first-base coach, and Ramón Santiago as third-base coach.
- On November 12, 2019 Josh Paul was named quality control coach.
- On September 19, 2020, the Tigers named bench coach Lloyd McClendon as interim manager replacing Ron Gardenhire who retired.

=== Releases ===
- On October 24, the Tigers outrighted catcher John Hicks and pitchers Victor Alcántara, Blaine Hardy, and Daniel Stumpf. All four players cleared waivers and elected free agency. On November 26, Hardy signed a minor-league contract with the Minnesota Twins. On January 27, Hicks signed a minor-league contract with the Arizona Diamondbacks.
- On November 4, the Tigers granted outfielder Mikie Mahtook free agency. On December 18, he signed a minor-league contract with the Philadelphia Phillies.
- On November 25, the Tigers released pitcher Drew VerHagen. He signed a one-year contract with the Hokkaido Nippon-Ham Fighters of Nippon Professional Baseball (NPB).
- On December 9, infielder Ronny Rodríguez was claimed off waivers by the Milwaukee Brewers.
- On December 11, pitcher Eduardo Jiménez signed a minor-league contract with the Arizona Diamondbacks.
- On December 26, pitcher Matt Moore signed with the Fukuoka SoftBank Hawks of Nippon Professional Baseball (NPB).
- On January 11, pitcher Ryan Carpenter signed with the Rakuten Monkeys of the Chinese Professional Baseball League (CPBL).
- On January 13, pitcher Tyson Ross signed a minor-league contract with the San Francisco Giants.
- On January 27, pitcher Austin Adams signed a minor-league contract with the Minnesota Twins.
- On February 2, pitcher Edwin Jackson signed a minor-league contract with the Arizona Diamondbacks.
- On February 10, infielder Gordon Beckham signed a minor-league contract with the San Diego Padres.
- On July 13, the Tigers released pitcher Zack Godley.
- On July 21, the Tigers released pitcher Hector Santiago.
- On August 6, the Tigers shortstop Jordy Mercer was designated for assignment, he then elected free agency. On August 17 he signed a minor-league contract with the New York Yankees.

=== Signings ===
- On December 8, the Tigers signed outfielder Jorge Bonifacio to a minor-league contract, with an invitation to spring training.
- On December 12, the Tigers claimed pitcher Rony García from the New York Yankees organization in the Rule 5 draft.
- On December 13, the Tigers signed catcher Austin Romine to a one-year, $4.15 million contract.
- On December 18, the Tigers signed pitcher Shao-Ching Chiang to a minor-league contract.
- On December 20, the Tigers signed pitcher Zack Godley to a minor-league contract.
- On December 21, the Tigers signed first baseman C. J. Cron and second baseman Jonathan Schoop to one-year, $6.1 million contracts.
- On January 4, the Tigers signed pitcher Alex Wilson to a minor-league contract, with an invitation to spring training.
- On January 6, the Tigers signed pitcher Michael Fulmer to a one-year, $2.8 million contract, avoiding arbitration.
- On January 10, the Tigers avoided arbitration when they reached one-year deals with pitchers Matthew Boyd ($5.3 million), Buck Farmer ($1.15 million) and Daniel Norris ($2.962 million), and outfielder JaCoby Jones ($1.575 million).
- On January 13, the Tigers signed pitcher Iván Nova to a one-year, $1.5 million contract.
- On January 22, the Tigers signed pitcher Hector Santiago to a minor-league contract, with an invitation to spring training.
- On January 30, the Tigers signed shortstop Jordy Mercer to a minor-league contract, with an invitation to spring training.
- On February 12, the Tigers signed outfielder Cameron Maybin to a one-year, $1.5 million contract which could increase to $2.8 million with bonuses.
- On August 31, the Tigers claimed pitcher Dereck Rodríguez off waivers from the San Francisco Giants.

=== Trades ===
- On November 25, the Tigers acquired pitcher Darío Agrazal from the Pittsburgh Pirates in exchange for cash considerations. He was designated for assignment by the Tigers on January 8.
- On January 8, the Tigers acquired catcher Eric Haase from the Cleveland Indians in exchange for cash considerations.
- On January 17, the Tigers traded pitcher Matt Hall to the Boston Red Sox in exchange for catcher Jhon Nunez.
- On August 31, the Tigers traded outfielder Cameron Maybin to the Chicago Cubs in exchange for shortstop Zack Short.

== Season standings ==
=== American League Central ===
AL Central
Team	W	L	Pct.	GB	Home	Road
Minnesota Twins	36	24	.600	—	24‍–‍7	12‍–‍17
Cleveland Indians	35	25	.583	1	18‍–‍12	17‍–‍13
Chicago White Sox	35	25	.583	1	18‍–‍12	17‍–‍13
Kansas City Royals	26	34	.433	10	15‍–‍15	11‍–‍19
Detroit Tigers	23	35	.397	12	12‍–‍15	11‍–‍20

=== Record against opponents ===
2020 American League record Source: MLB Standings Grid – 2020
Team	CWS	CLE	DET	KC	MIN	NL
Chicago	—	2–8	9–1	9–1	5–5	10–10
Cleveland	8–2	—	7–3	5–5	3–7	12–8
Detroit	1–9	3–7	—	4–6	4–6	11–7
Kansas City	1–9	5–5	6–4	—	5–5	9–11
Minnesota	5–5	7–3	6–4	5–5	—	13–7

=== American League Wild Card ===
Division leaders
Team	W	L	Pct.
Tampa Bay Rays	40	20	.667
Oakland Athletics	36	24	.600
Minnesota Twins	36	24	.600

Division 2nd place
Team	W	L	Pct.
Cleveland Indians	35	25	.583
New York Yankees	33	27	.550
Houston Astros	29	31	.483

Wild Card teams (Top 2 teams qualify for postseason)
Team	W	L	Pct.	GB
Chicago White Sox	35	25	.583	+3
Toronto Blue Jays	32	28	.533	—
Seattle Mariners	27	33	.450	5
Los Angeles Angels	26	34	.433	6
Kansas City Royals	26	34	.433	6
Baltimore Orioles	25	35	.417	7
Boston Red Sox	24	36	.400	8
Detroit Tigers	23	35	.397	8
Texas Rangers	22	38	.367	10

== Season highlights ==
=== Individual accomplishments ===
==== Pitching ====
- On August 2 against the Cincinnati Reds, Tyler Alexander set an MLB record for a reliever by striking out nine consecutive batters. He also tied the Tigers' and American League record of nine consecutive strikeouts set by Doug Fister on September 27, 2012. He became the first pitcher with 10 or more strikeouts in a relief outing since Randy Johnson set the strikeout record for a relief pitcher with 16 on July 18, 2001.
- On September 11 against the Chicago White Sox, Casey Mize took a no-hitter into the sixth inning, before a double by Yolmer Sánchez ruined the no-hit bid.
- On September 20 against the Cleveland Indians, Matthew Boyd took a perfect game into the fifth inning before Carlos Santana got on base with a single.

==== Hitting ====
- On August 21 against the Cleveland Indians, Isaac Paredes hit a grand slam for his first major league home run, the first Tiger to do so since Brennan Boesch in 2010.
- On August 30 against the Minnesota Twins, Miguel Cabrera recorded his 2,000th hit as a Tiger, becoming the eighth Tiger player to reach the milestone.
- On September 6 against the Minnesota Twins, Sergio Alcántara hit a home run in his first at-bat, becoming the eighth Tiger player to accomplish this feat, and the first position player to do since Reggie Sanders in 1974.

=== Team accomplishments ===
==== Hitting ====
- On August 8 against the Pittsburgh Pirates, the Tigers hit four home runs in the first inning for the first time since 1974, and the first time the Tigers hit four home runs in any inning since 2013. This was the first time an MLB team accomplished this since the Kansas City Royals in 2018. The Tigers hit three consecutive home runs in an inning for the first time since 2017.

==== Other ====
- On August 21, the Tigers ended a franchise-record 20-game losing streak against the Cleveland Indians, winning 10–5. Only one MLB team has had a longer losing streak against another team, that being the Kansas City Royals who lost 23 straight to the Baltimore Orioles between May 10, 1969, and August 2, 1970.

== Game log ==
2020 Game Log: 23–35 (Home 12–16, Road 11–19)
July: 5–3 (Home 3–2, Road 2–1)

#	Date	Opponent	Score	Win	Loss	Save	Record	Streak
1	July 24	@ Reds	1–7	Gray (1–0)	**Boyd** (0–1)	—	0–1	L1
2	July 25	@ Reds	6–4	**Farmer** (1–0)	Iglesias (0–1)	**Jiménez** (1)	1–1	W1
3	July 26	@ Reds	3–2	**Cisnero** (1–0)	Lorenzen (0–1)	**Jiménez** (2)	2–1	W2
4	July 27	Royals	6–14	Griffin (1–0)	**Funkhouser** (0–1)	—	2–2	L1
5	July 28	Royals	4–3	**Alexander** (1–0)	Zuber (0–1)	**Jiménez** (3)	3–2	W1
6	July 29	Royals	5–4	**Garcia** (1–0)	Kennedy (0–1)	**Jiménez** (4)	4–2	W2
7	July 30	Royals	3–5	Holland (1–0)	**Cisnero** (1–1)	Rosenthal (1)	4–3	L1
8	July 31	Reds	7–2	**Turnbull** (1–0)	Castillo (0–1)	—	5–3	W1

August: 11–13 (Home 6–8, Road 5–5)

#	Date	Opponent	Score	Win	Loss	Save	Record	Streak
—	August 1	Reds	Postponed (inclement weather). Rescheduled to August 2.					
9	August 2	Reds	3–4 (7)	Iglesias (1–1)	**Jiménez** (0–1)	—	5–4	L1
10	August 2	Reds	0–4 (7)	Bauer (1–0)	**Norris** (0–1)	—	5–5	L2
—	August 3	Cardinals	Postponed (Cardinals' COVID-19 outbreak). Rescheduled to September 28.					
—	August 4	Cardinals	Postponed (Cardinals' COVID-19 outbreak). Rescheduled to September 28.					
—	August 5	@ Cardinals	Postponed (Cardinals' COVID-19 outbreak). Rescheduled to September 10.					
—	August 6	@ Cardinals	Postponed (Cardinals' COVID-19 outbreak). Rescheduled to September 10.					
11	August 7	@ Pirates	17–13 (11)	**Garcia** (2–0)	Neverauskas (0–2)	—	6–5	W1
12	August 8	@ Pirates	11–5	**Nova** (1–0)	Holland (0–1)	—	7–5	W2
13	August 9	@ Pirates	2–1	**Turnbull** (2–0)	Rodríguez (0–1)	**Jiménez** (5)	8–5	W3
14	August 10	White Sox	5–1	**Norris** (1–1)	Keuchel (2–2)	—	9–5	W4
15	August 11	White Sox	4–8	Foster (2–0)	**Alexander** (1–1)	—	9–6	L1
16	August 12	White Sox	5–7	Cease (3–1)	**Boyd** (0–2)	Colomé (5)	9–7	L2
17	August 14	Indians	5–10	Civale (2–2)	**Nova** (1–1)	—	9–8	L3
18	August 15	Indians	1–3	Bieber (4–0)	**Turnbull** (2–1)	Hand (5)	9–9	L4
19	August 16	Indians	5–8	Pérez (1–0)	**Schreiber** (0–1)	—	9–10	L5
20	August 17	@ White Sox	2–7	Heuer (1–0)	**Boyd** (0–3)	—	9–11	L6
21	August 18	@ White Sox	4–10	Cease (4–1)	**Skubal** (0–1)	—	9–12	L7
22	August 19	@ White Sox	3–5	Marshall (1–1)	**Soto** (0–1)	Colomé (6)	9–13	L8
23	August 20	@ White Sox	0–9	Giolito (2–2)	**Turnbull** (2–2)	—	9–14	L9
24	August 21	@ Indians	10–5	**García** (1–0)	Plutko (1–2)	—	10–14	W1
25	August 22	@ Indians	1–6	McKenzie (1–0)	**Boyd** (0–4)	—	10–15	L1
26	August 23	@ Indians	7–4	**Norris** (2–1)	Carrasco (2–3)	–	11–15	W1
27	August 24	Cubs	3–9	Mills (3–2)	**Mize** (0–1)	—	11–16	L1
28	August 25	Cubs	7–1	**Turnbull** (3–2)	Chatwood (2–2)	—	12–16	W1
29	August 26	Cubs	7–6	**Jiménez** (1–1)	Tepera (0–1)	—	13–16	W2
—	August 27	Twins	Postponed (strikes due to shooting of Jacob Blake); Rescheduled to August 28.					
—	August 28	Twins	Postponed (inclement weather). Rescheduled to August 29.					
—	August 28	Twins	Postponed (inclement weather). Rescheduled to September 4 at Target Field.					
30	August 29	Twins	8–2 (7)	**Boyd** (1–4)	Dobnak (5–2)	—	14–16	W3
31	August 29	Twins	4–2 (7)	**Skubal** (1–1)	Duffey (1–1)	**Soto** (1)	15–16	W4
32	August 30	Twins	3–2	**Alexander** (2–1)	Maeda (4–1)	**Soto** (2)	16–16	W5

September: 7–19 (Home 3–6, Road 4–13)

#	Date	Opponent	Score	Win	Loss	Save	Record	Streak
33	September 1	@ Brewers	12–1	**Norris** (3–1)	Lindblom (1–3)	—	17–16	W6
34	September 2	@ Brewers	5–8	Yardley (2–0)	**Jiménez** (1–2)	Hader (9)	17–17	L1
35	September 4	@ Twins	0–2 (7)	Dobnak (6–2)	**Boyd** (1–5)	Rogers (8)	17–18	L2
36	September 4	@ Twins ^{[a]}	2–3 (8)	Romo (1–1)	**Jiménez** (1–3)	May (2)	17–19	L3
37	September 5	@ Twins	3–4	Alcalá (2–1)	**Cisnero** (1–2)	—	17–20	L4
38	September 6	@ Twins	10–8	**Funkhouser** (1–1)	Romo (1–2)	**Garcia** (1)	18–20	W1
39	September 7	@ Twins	2–6	Pineda (1–0)	**Fulmer** (0–1)	—	18–21	L1
40	September 8	Brewers	8–3	**Turnbull** (4–2)	Houser (1–4)	—	19–21	W1
41	September 9	Brewers	0–19	Burnes (3–0)	**Boyd** (1–6)	—	19–22	L1
42	September 10	@ Cardinals	2–12 (7)	Flaherty (3–1)	**Skubal** (1–2)	—	19–23	L2
43	September 10	@ Cardinals	6–3 (7)	**Cisnero** (2–2)	Gallegos (1–2)	**Garcia** (2)	20–23	W1
44	September 11	@ White Sox	3–4	Marshall (2–1)	**Cisnero** (2–3)	Colomé (10)	20–24	L1
45	September 12	@ White Sox	0–14	López (1–2)	**Fulmer** (0–2)	—	20–25	L2
46	September 13	@ White Sox	2–5	Cordero (1–2)	**Turnbull** (4–3)	Colomé (11)	20–26	L3
47	September 15	Royals	6–0	**Boyd** (2–6)	Junis (0–2)	—	21–26	W1
48	September 16	Royals	0–4	Singer (3–4)	**Skubal** (1–3)	—	21–27	L1
49	September 17	Indians	3–10	Bieber (8–1)	**Mize** (0–2)	—	21–28	L2
50	September 18	Indians	0–1	Plesac (4–2)	**Alexander** (2–2)	Hand (13)	21–29	L3
51	September 19	Indians	5–2	**Cisnero** (3–3)	Maton (2–3)	**Garcia** (3)	22–29	W1
52	September 20	Indians	4–7	Carrasco (3–4)	**Boyd** (2–7)	—	22–30	L1
53	September 22	@ Twins	4–5 (10)	Rogers (2–4)	**Garcia** (2–1)	—	22–31	L2
54	September 23	@ Twins	6–7	Maeda (6–1)	**Mize** (0–3)	Romo (5)	22–32	L3
55	September 24	@ Royals	7–8	Hahn (1–0)	**Alexander** (2–3)	Newberry (1)	22–33	L4
56	September 25	@ Royals	2–3	Keller (5–3)	**Turnbull** (4–4)	Hahn (2)	22–34	L5
57	September 26	@ Royals	4–3	**Boyd** (3–7)	Hernández (0–1)	**Garcia** (4)	23–34	W1
58	September 27	@ Royals	1–3	Singer (4–5)	**Skubal** (1–4)	Hahn (3)	23–35	L1
59	September 28	Cardinals	Cancelled					
60	September 28	Cardinals	Cancelled					

Legend: = Win = Loss = Postponement
Bold = Tigers team member

Notes:

- **^{a}** The Tigers were designated the home team for the makeup game from August 28.

== Roster ==
2020 Detroit Tigers
Roster
Pitchers: 70 Tyler Alexander; 48 Matthew Boyd; 37 Beau Burrows; 38 Anthony Castro; 67 José Cisnero; 45 Buck Farmer; 60 Carson Fulmer; 32 Michael Fulmer; 36 Kyle Funkhouser; 33 Bryan Garcia; 51 Rony García; 21,77 Joe Jiménez; 62 David McKay; 12 Casey Mize; 44 Daniel Norris; 43 Iván Nova; 63 Nick Ramirez; 71 John Schreiber; 29 Tarik Skubal; 65 Gregory Soto; 56 Spencer Turnbull; 27 Jordan Zimmermann	Catchers: 17 Grayson Greiner; 13 Eric Haase; 7 Austin Romine; Infielders: 40 Sergio Alcántara; 46 Jeimer Candelario; 49 Willi Castro; 26 C. J. Cron; 9 Brandon Dixon; 28 Niko Goodrum; 18 Dawel Lugo; 9 Jordy Mercer; 19 Isaac Paredes; 8 Jonathan Schoop	Outfielders: 57 Jorge Bonifacio; 41 Daz Cameron; 30 Harold Castro; 50 Travis Demeritte; 54 Derek Hill; 21 JaCoby Jones; 4 Cameron Maybin; 22 Víctor Reyes; 14 Christin Stewart; Other Batters: 24 Miguel Cabrera	Manager: 15 Ron Gardenhire; 20 Lloyd McClendon; Coaches: 4 Rick Anderson (pitching); 98 Jeremy Carrell (bullpen catcher); 25 Dave Clark (first base); 59 Phil Clark (assistant hitting); 20 Lloyd McClendon (bench); 88 Josh Paul (quality control/bench); 53 Jeff Pico (bullpen); 99 Tim Remes (bullpen catcher); 39 Ramón Santiago (third base); 52 Joe Vavra (hitting)

== Player stats ==
=== Batting ===
Note: G = Games played; AB = At Bats; R = Runs scored; H = Hits; 2B = Doubles; 3B = Triples; HR = Home runs; RBI = Runs batted in; AVG = Batting average; SB = Stolen bases

Player	G	AB	R	H	2B	3B	HR	RBI	AVG	SB
Sergio Alcántara	10	21	2	3	0	1	1	1	.143	0
Jorge Bonifacio	30	86	8	19	3	0	2	17	.221	0
Miguel Cabrera	57	204	28	51	4	0	10	35	.250	1
Daz Cameron	17	57	4	11	2	1	0	3	.193	1
Jeimer Candelario	52	185	30	55	11	3	7	29	.297	1
Harold Castro	22	49	6	17	4	0	0	3	.347	0
Willi Castro	36	129	21	45	4	2	6	24	.349	0
C. J. Cron	13	42	9	8	3	0	4	8	.190	0
Travis Demeritte	18	29	5	5	1	0	0	4	.172	0
Brandon Dixon	5	13	0	1	1	0	0	2	.077	0
Niko Goodrum	43	158	15	29	7	1	5	20	.184	7
Grayson Greiner	18	51	8	6	2	0	3	8	.118	0
Eric Haase	7	17	1	3	0	0	0	2	.176	0
Derek Hill	15	11	3	1	0	0	0	2	.091	0
JaCoby Jones	30	97	19	26	9	0	5	14	.268	1
Dawel Lugo	9	10	3	2	0	0	0	1	.200	0
Cameron Maybin+	14	41	5	10	4	0	1	2	.244	0
Jordy Mercer+	3	9	1	2	0	0	0	1	.222	0
Isaac Paredes	34	100	7	22	4	0	1	6	.220	0
Víctor Reyes	57	202	30	56	7	2	4	14	.277	8
Austin Romine	37	130	12	31	5	0	2	17	.238	0
Jonathan Schoop	44	162	26	45	4	2	8	23	.278	0
Christin Stewart	36	90	6	15	3	0	3	9	.167	0
Team totals	58	1893	249	463	78	12	62	242	.245	19

+Totals with Tigers only.

=== Pitching ===
==== Starters and other pitchers ====
Note: W = Wins; L = Losses; ERA = Earned run average; G = Games pitched; GS = Games started; SV = Saves; IP = Innings pitched; R = Runs allowed; ER = Earned runs allowed; BB = Walks allowed; K = Strikeouts

Player	W	L	ERA	G	GS	SV	IP	R	ER	BB	K
Tyler Alexander	2	3	3.96	14	2	0	36 1/3	16	16	9	34
Matthew Boyd	3	7	6.71	12	12	0	60 1/3	46	45	22	60
Michael Fulmer	0	2	8.78	10	10	0	27 2/3	27	27	12	20
Casey Mize	0	3	6.99	7	7	0	28 1/3	25	22	13	26
Iván Nova	1	1	8.53	4	4	0	19	18	18	9	9
Tarik Skubal	1	4	5.63	8	7	0	32	21	20	11	37
Spencer Turnbull	4	4	3.97	11	11	0	56 2/3	25	25	29	21
Jordan Zimmermann	0	0	7.94	3	2	0	5 2/3	6	5	2	6

==== Bullpen ====
Player	W	L	ERA	G	GS	SV	IP	R	ER	BB	K
Beau Burrows	0	0	5.40	5	0	0	6 2/3	4	4	1	3
Anthony Castro	0	0	18.00	1	0	0	1	2	2	1	1
José Cisnero	3	3	3.03	29	0	0	29 2/3	10	10	10	34
Buck Farmer	1	0	3.80	23	0	0	21 1/3	9	9	5	14
Carson Fulmer	0	0	6.75	7	0	0	6 2/3	5	5	3	7
Kyle Funkhouser	1	1	7.27	13	0	0	17 1/3	14	14	11	12
Bryan Garcia	2	1	1.66	26	0	4	21 2/3	6	4	10	12
Rony García	1	0	8.14	15	2	0	21	20	19	9	14
Joe Jiménez	1	3	7.15	25	0	5	22 2/3	19	18	6	22
David McKay	1	0	54.00	1	0	0	1/3	2	2	1	0
Daniel Norris	3	1	3.25	14	1	0	27 2/3	10	10	7	28
Nick Ramirez	0	0	5.91	5	0	0	10 2/3	7	7	4	11
John Schreiber	0	1	6.32	15	0	0	15 2/3	11	11	4	14
Gregory Soto	0	1	4.30	27	0	2	23	11	11	13	29
Team Pitching Totals	23	35	5.63	58	58	11	492 1/3	318	308	192	444

== Farm system ==
Level	Team	League	Manager
AAA	Toledo Mud Hens	International League	Tom Prince
AA	Erie SeaWolves	Eastern League	Arnie Beyeler
A-Advanced	Lakeland Flying Tigers	Florida State League	Andrew Graham
A	West Michigan Whitecaps	Midwest League	Brayan Peña
A-Short Season	Norwich Sea Unicorns	New York–Penn League	Gary Cathcart
Rookie	GCL Tigers East	Gulf Coast League	Francisco Contreras
Rookie	GCL Tigers West	Gulf Coast League	Ryan Minor
Rookie	DSL Tigers 1	Dominican Summer League	Ramon Zapata
Rookie	DSL Tigers 2	Dominican Summer League	Marcos Yepez

== See also ==
- COVID-19 pandemic in Michigan
- Impact of the COVID-19 pandemic on sports
