= Grayson Greiner =

American baseball player (born 1992)

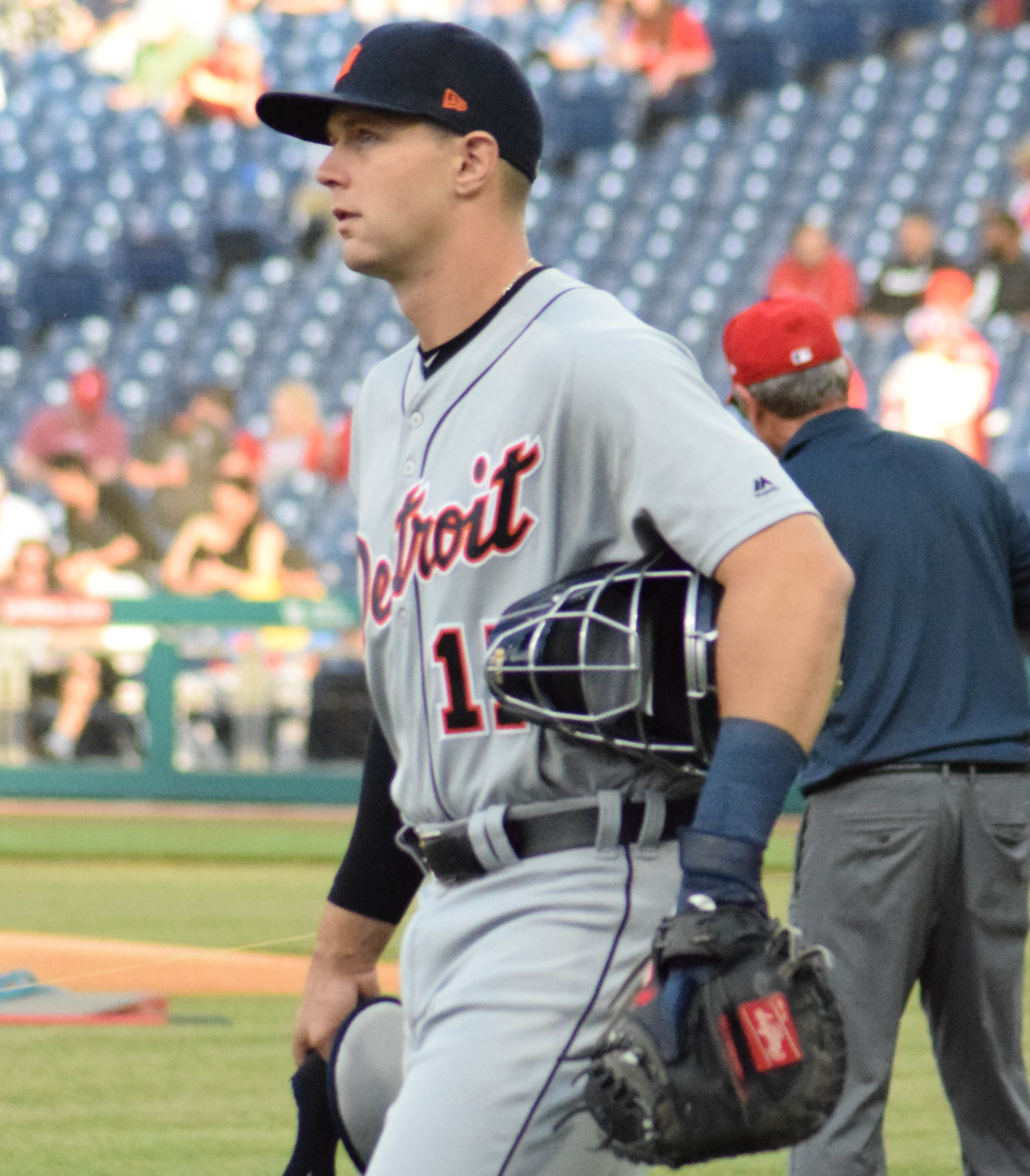
- Greiner with the Tigers in 2019
- Catcher
- Born: October 11, 1992 (age 33); Columbia, South Carolina, U.S.
- Batted: Right Threw: Right

MLB debut
- May 6, 2018, for the Detroit Tigers

Last MLB appearance
- May 23, 2022, for the Arizona Diamondbacks

MLB statistics
- Batting average: .201
- Home runs: 9
- Runs batted in: 46
- Stats at Baseball Reference

Teams
- Detroit Tigers (2018–2021); Arizona Diamondbacks (2022)

Grayson James Greiner (born October 11, 1992) is an American former professional baseball catcher. He played in Major League Baseball (MLB) for the Detroit Tigers and Arizona Diamondbacks from 2018 to 2022.

== Career ==
=== Amateur career ===
Greiner graduated from Blythewood High School in Blythewood, South Carolina. He enrolled at the University of South Carolina to play college baseball for the South Carolina Gamecocks from 2012 to 2014. He played in 179 games during his Gamecocks career, hitting .278/.358/.435 with 18 home runs.

=== Minor leagues ===
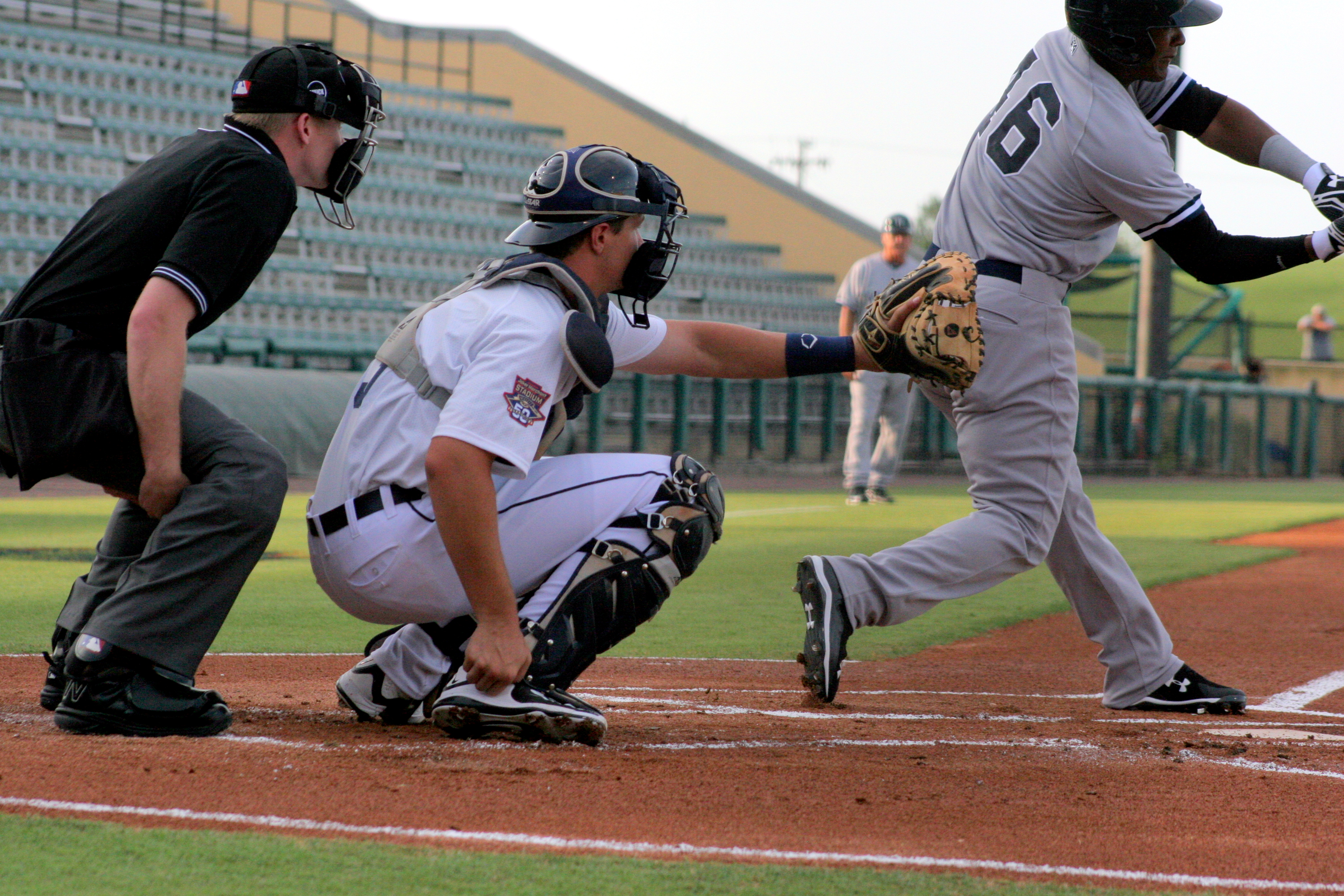
Greiner (center) catching for the Lakeland Flying Tigers in 2015

The Detroit Tigers selected Greiner in the third round of the 2014 Major League Baseball draft. He signed with the Tigers and made his professional debut with the West Michigan Whitecaps. He played in 26 games before a broken hamate bone in his left wrist ended his season. He hit .322/.394/.444 with two home runs. Greiner spent 2015 with the Lakeland Flying Tigers, where he struggled, batting only .183 in 89 games. However, Greiner improved greatly in 2016, where he split time among Lakeland, the Erie SeaWolves, and the Toledo Mud Hens, posting a combined .293 batting average with seven home runs and 42 RBIs between the three clubs. After the season, the Tigers assigned Greiner to the Salt River Rafters of the Arizona Fall League.

In 2017, Greiner played for both Erie and Toledo, batting a combined .237 with 14 home runs and 44 RBIs in 103 total games between the two teams. The Tigers added him to their 40-man roster after the season.

=== Detroit Tigers (2018–2021) ===
On May 4, 2018, the Tigers promoted Greiner to the major leagues. He made his major league debut two days later, and hit a single in his first-ever major league at-bat. Greiner was sent back down to Toledo on May 31. He was recalled by Detroit on June 12.

The Tigers decided not to retain James McCann for the 2019 season which elevated Greiner to the starting catcher position after only playing in 30 games the previous season, his first season in the majors. On June 14, the Tigers placed Greiner on the 10-day Injured List due to a lower back strain. He was later moved to the 60-day IL. He was activated from the IL on August 24 and optioned to triple-A Toledo Mud Hens. Greiner was added to the major league roster as a September call-up. On the season, he hit .202 with 5 home runs and 19 RBI in 208 major league at-bats. Overall with the 2020 Detroit Tigers, Greiner batted .118 with three home runs and 8 RBIs in 18 games.

Greiner made the Tigers Opening Day roster out of 2021 spring training, and was expected to back up newly acquired Wilson Ramos. Greiner was placed on the 10-day injured list on May 12. He was optioned to Toledo after coming off the injured list due to the strong performance of his replacement, Eric Haase. Greiner was recalled to the major league club on July 19 following an injury to Jake Rogers. He played 31 games at the MLB level in 2021, hitting .236 with one home run and seven RBI. On November 29, 2021, Greiner was outrighted off the 40-man roster and elected free agency.

=== Arizona Diamondbacks (2022) ===
On March 15, 2022, Greiner signed a minor league contract with the Arizona Diamondbacks. He was assigned to the Triple-A Reno Aces to begin the year. On May 19, Greiner was selected to the active roster after José Herrera was placed on the injured list. He was returned to the minors on May 22 after going 1–for–6 in two games. In 45 games for Reno, Greiner batted .232/.318/.391 with 6 home runs and 20 RBI. He elected free agency following the season on November 10.

=== Colorado Rockies (2023) ===
On January 13, 2023, Greiner signed a minor league deal with the Minnesota Twins. Greiner was released by the organization on March 24.

On March 28, 2023, Greiner signed a minor league contract with the Colorado Rockies organization and was assigned to the Triple-A Albuquerque Isotopes. He played in 20 games for Albuquerque, hitting .186/.269/.286 with one home run and 8 RBI. On May 7, Greiner retired from professional baseball.

== Personal life ==
Greiner and his wife, Madison, have two sons together.
