= Faccini =

Faccini is an Italian surname, derived from the given name Bonifacio. Notable people with the surname include:

- Andrea Faccini (born 1966), Italian cyclist
- Ben Faccini, English novelist, writer and translator
- Paolo Alberto Faccini (born 1961), Italian footballer
- Piers Faccini (born 1970), English singer, songwriter and painter
- Pietro Faccini (1562–1602), Italian painter, draughtsman and printmaker

== See also ==
- Faccani
- Faccini Dori v Recreb Srl
