= Demeritte =

Demeritte is a surname. Notable people with the surname include:

- Dominic Demeritte (born 1978), Bahamian sprinter
- Travis Demeritte (born 1994), American professional baseball player
