= Sergio Alcántara =

Dominican baseball player (born 1996)

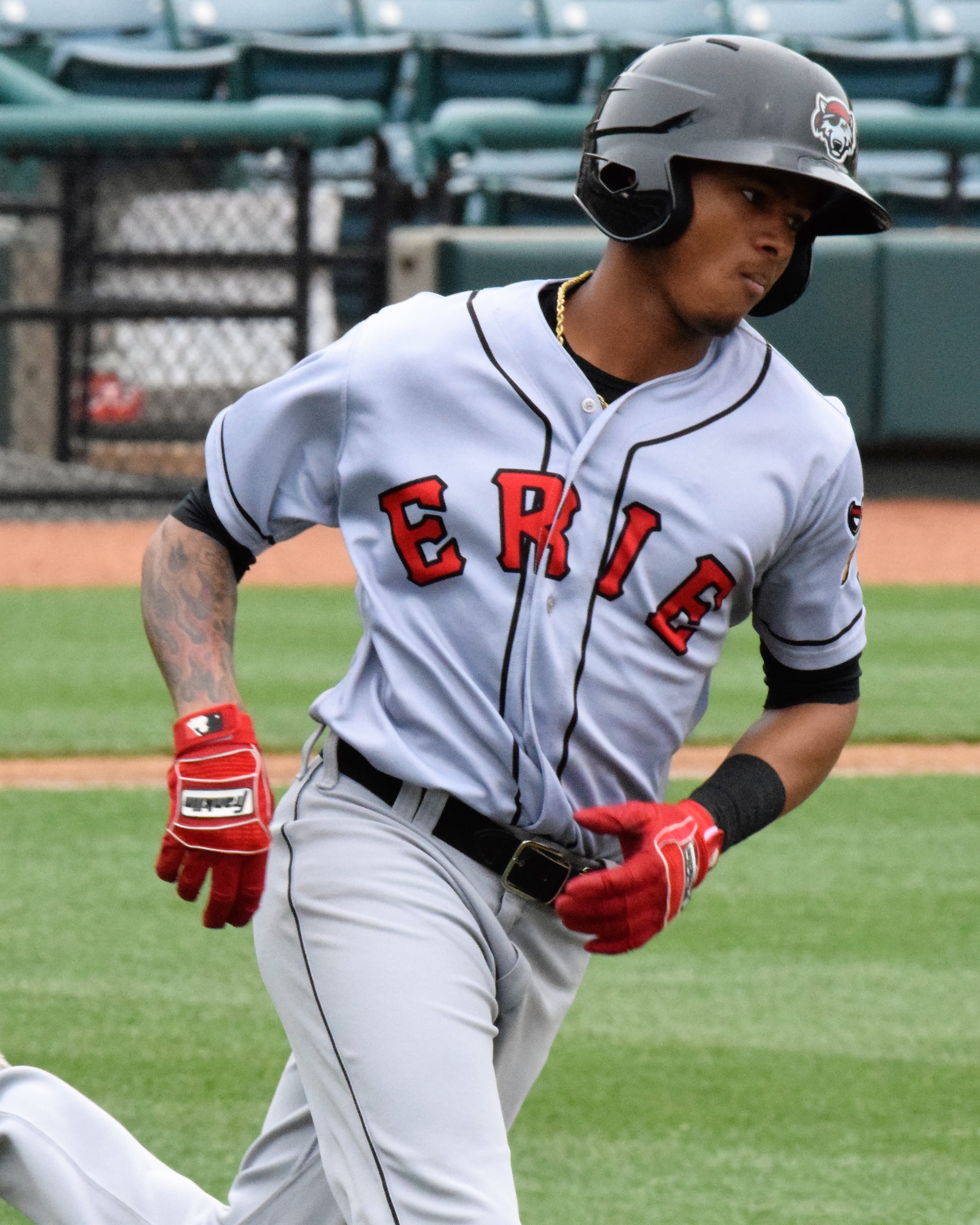
- Alcántara with the Erie SeaWolves in 2018

Pericos de Puebla – No. 2
- Shortstop
- Born: July 10, 1996 (age 30); Santo Domingo, Dominican Republic
- Bats: Switch Throws: Right

MLB debut
- September 6, 2020, for the Detroit Tigers

MLB statistics (through 2025 season)
- Batting average: .207
- Home runs: 12
- Runs batted in: 47
- Stats at Baseball Reference

Teams
- Detroit Tigers (2020); Chicago Cubs (2021); Arizona Diamondbacks (2022); San Diego Padres (2022); Arizona Diamondbacks (2022); San Francisco Giants (2025)

Sergio Junior Alcántara Hernández (born July 10, 1996) is a Dominican professional baseball infielder for the Pericos de Puebla of the Mexican League. He has previously played in Major League Baseball (MLB) for the Detroit Tigers, Chicago Cubs, Arizona Diamondbacks, San Diego Padres, and San Francisco Giants.

== Career ==
=== Arizona Diamondbacks ===
Alcántara signed with the Arizona Diamondbacks as an international free agent on July 10, 2012, for a $700,000 signing bonus. He made his professional debut in 2013 with the rookie-level Arizona League Diamondbacks and spent the whole season there, slashing .243/.398/.320 with 16 RBI in 48 games. In 2014, Alcántara played for the Missoula Osprey where he batted .244 with one home run and 18 RBI in 70 games, and in 2015, he played for the Kane County Cougars and Hillsboro Hops where he posted a combined .223 batting average with one home run and 28 RBI in 91 total games between the two teams. Alcántara spent 2016 with the AZL Diamondbacks, Hillsboro, Kane County, and the Visalia Rawhide, compiling a .284 batting average with one home run and 26 RBI in 76 total games. He began 2017 back with Visalia.

=== Detroit Tigers ===
On July 18, 2017, the Diamondbacks traded Alcántara along with Dawel Lugo and Jose King to the Detroit Tigers in exchange for J. D. Martinez. Detroit assigned him to the High-A Lakeland Flying Tigers and he finished the season there. In 121 total games between Visalia and Lakeland, he slashed .266/.334/.339 with three home runs, 35 RBI, and a .673 OPS.

On November 20, 2017, the Tigers added Alcántara to their 40-man roster to protect him from the Rule 5 draft. In 2018, he spent the full season with the Double-A Erie SeaWolves, where he hit .271 with a home run, 37 RBI, and eighteen doubles. For the second straight season, Alcántara would remain at the Double-A level for the full season during the 2019 season. Playing in 102 games (18 fewer than in 2018) he finished the season with a .247 average and .346 OBP. Alcántara hit two home runs, had 27 RBI, but walked 48 times, six times more than in 2018. Alcántara was invited to spring training for the 2020 season but it was cut short due to the COVID-19 pandemic. When the league started but up in the summer, Alcántara missed the beginning of summer camp when he tested positive for COVID-19.

On September 4, 2020, the Tigers called up Alcántara as the 29th man for a doubleheader against the Minnesota Twins but was sent back down to the alternate training site afterwards without getting a chance to play. He was called up again the next day and made his major league debut on September 6. Alcántara hit a home run in his first at-bat with the Tigers, becoming the eighth Tiger player to accomplish this feat, and the first position player for the Tigers to do since Reggie Sanders in 1974. Overall with the 2020 Detroit Tigers, Alcántara batted .143 with one home run and one RBI in 10 games.

On January 29, 2021, Alcántara was designated for assignment by the Tigers following the signing of Wilson Ramos.

=== Chicago Cubs ===
On February 5, 2021, Alcántara was claimed by the Chicago Cubs off waivers from the Tigers. On February 18, Alcántara was designated for assignment after the signing of Brandon Workman was made official. On February 20, Alcántara was outrighted and invited to spring training as a non-roster invitee. He was assigned to the Triple-A Iowa Cubs to begin the regular season. On May 30, Alcántara was selected to the active roster. In 89 appearances for the Cubs, he batted .205/.303/.327 with five home runs, 17 RBI, and three stolen bases.

Alcántara was designated for assignment by Chicago on March 23, 2022, to make room on the roster for Mychal Givens.

=== Arizona Diamondbacks (second stint) ===
On March 27, 2022, Alcántara was traded to the Arizona Diamondbacks in exchange for cash considerations. He was named to Arizona's opening day roster on April 7. He was designated for assignment on May 6.

=== San Diego Padres ===
On May 9, 2022, the San Diego Padres claimed him off waivers from the Diamondbacks. He was designated for assignment on June 30.

=== Arizona Diamondbacks (third stint) ===
On July 5, 2022, the Arizona Diamondbacks claimed him off waivers from the Padres. On November 15, Alcántara was designated for assignment by the Diamondbacks after they protected multiple prospects from the Rule 5 draft. On November 18, Alcántara was non–tendered by Arizona and became a free agent.

=== Chicago Cubs (second stint) ===
On December 20, 2022, Alcántara signed a minor league deal with the Chicago Cubs. In 64 games for the Triple–A Iowa Cubs, he batted .270/.364/.419 with 6 home runs and 32 RBI. On July 25, 2023, Alcántara was released by the Cubs organization.

=== Arizona Diamondbacks (fourth stint) ===
On August 1, 2023, Alcántara signed a minor league contract with the Arizona Diamondbacks organization. In 34 games for the Triple–A Reno Aces, he hit .265/.392/.372 with 2 home runs and 19 RBI. Alcántara elected free agency following the season on November 6.

=== Pittsburgh Pirates ===
On December 9, 2023, Alcántara signed a minor league contract with the Pittsburgh Pirates. In 11 games for the Triple–A Indianapolis Indians, he went 6–for–33 (.182) with no home runs and one RBI.

=== Arizona Diamondbacks (fifth stint) ===
On April 23, 2024, Alcántara was traded to the Arizona Diamondbacks in exchange for cash considerations. In 112 games for the Triple–A Reno Aces, he slashed .279/.391/.434 with eight home runs, 57 RBI, and eight stolen bases. Alcántara elected free agency following the season on November 4.

=== San Francisco Giants ===
On November 6, 2024, Alcántara signed a minor league contract with the San Francisco Giants. In 68 appearances for the Triple-A Sacramento River Cats, he batted .206/.319/.252 with 14 RBI and two stolen bases. On July 3, 2025, the Giants selected Alcántara's contract, adding him to their active roster. He made one appearance for the team, going hitless in four at-bats, and was designated for assignment on July 5. Alcántara cleared waivers and was sent outright to Sacramento on July 10; however, he elected free agency the same day.

=== Arizona Diamondbacks (sixth stint) ===
On July 18, 2025, Alcántara signed a major league contract with the Arizona Diamondbacks. He went unused over two games for Arizona, and was designated for assignment by the team on July 20. Alcántara cleared waivers and was sent outright to the Triple-A Reno Aces on July 22. He elected free agency on September 29.

=== Philadelphia Phillies ===
On January 28, 2026, Alcántara signed a minor league contract with the Washington Nationals. He was released by the Nationals prior to the start of the regular season on March 24. On March 27, Alcántara signed a minor league contract with the Philadelphia Phillies. He made 35 appearances for the Triple-A Lehigh Valley IronPigs, slashing .223/.389/.348 with two home runs, 13 RBI, and four stolen bases. Alcántara was released by the Phillies organization on May 24.

=== Pericos de Puebla ===
On June 2, 2026, Alcántara signed with the Pericos de Puebla of the Mexican League.
