= Niko Goodrum =

American baseball player (born 1992)

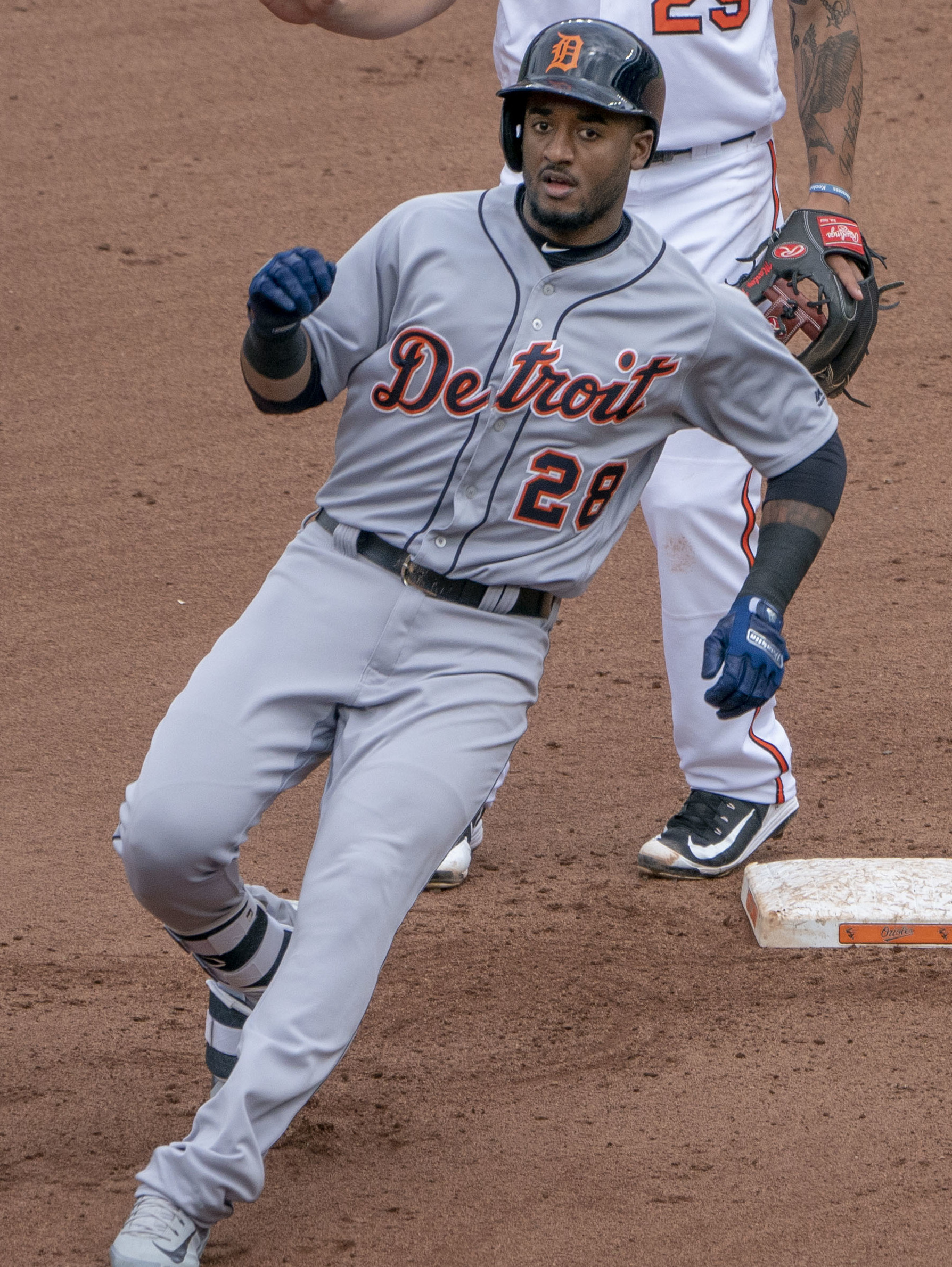
- Goodrum with the Detroit Tigers in 2018
- Utility player
- Born: February 28, 1992 (age 34); Atlanta, Georgia, U.S.
- Batted: Switch Threw: Right

Professional debut
- MLB: September 2, 2017, for the Minnesota Twins
- KBO: July 21, 2023, for the Lotte Giants

Last appearance
- MLB: May 13, 2024, for the Los Angeles Angels
- KBO: October 10, 2023, for the Lotte Giants

MLB statistics
- Batting average: .224
- Home runs: 42
- Runs batted in: 152
- Stolen bases: 47

KBO statistics
- Batting average: .295
- Home runs: 0
- Runs batted in: 28
- Stats at Baseball Reference

Teams
- Minnesota Twins (2017); Detroit Tigers (2018–2021); Houston Astros (2022); Lotte Giants (2023); Tampa Bay Rays (2024); Los Angeles Angels (2024)

Cartier Niko Goodrum (born February 28, 1992) is an American former professional baseball utility player. He played in Major League Baseball (MLB) for the Minnesota Twins, Detroit Tigers, Houston Astros, Tampa Bay Rays, and Los Angeles Angels. He also played in the KBO League for the Lotte Giants. Goodrum played every fielding position in his major league career except pitcher and catcher.

== Career ==
=== Minnesota Twins ===
Goodrum attended Fayette County High School in Fayetteville, Georgia. The Minnesota Twins selected Goodrum in the second round, with the 71st overall selection, of the 2010 Major League Baseball draft. He signed, receiving a $514,800 signing bonus, and made his professional debut with the Gulf Coast Twins of the Rookie-level Gulf Coast League.

With the Elizabethton Twins of the Rookie-level Appalachian League in 2011, Goodrum had a .275 batting average. For the Cedar Rapids Kernals of the Single–A Midwest League in 2013, Goodrum batted .260. In 2014, Goodrum played for the Fort Myers Miracle of the High–A Florida State League, where he batted .249 with 3 home runs and 49 RBI's and he transitioned from shortstop to third base. Goodrum spent 2015 with both Fort Myers and the Chattanooga Lookouts of the Double–A Southern League, where he posted a combined .232 batting average with nine home runs and 38 RBIs.

Goodrum began the 2017 season with the Rochester Red Wings of the Triple–A International League. The Twins promoted him to the major leagues on September 1, 2017. He was removed from the 40–man roster and sent outright to Triple–A on November 3. He elected free agency three days later.

=== Detroit Tigers ===
Goodrum signed a minor league contract with the Detroit Tigers on November 25, 2017. The deal included an invitation to the Tigers' 2018 spring training camp. After a strong spring season, which included hitting four home runs, Goodrum made the Tigers' 25-man opening day roster.

Goodrum hit his first major league home run on April 5, 2018, off Joakim Soria of the Chicago White Sox. On May 14, he hit two home runs while driving in five in a 6–3 Tigers win over the Cleveland Indians.

Goodrum finished the 2018 season with a .245 batting average, 16 home runs, 53 RBI, and 12 stolen bases, while playing six positions in the field (all four infield positions, plus left field and right field). He was awarded the 2018 Detroit Tigers Rookie of the Year Award in voting by members of Detroit Sports Media Association.

In a May 31, 2019, game against the Atlanta Braves, Goodrum went 5-for-5 with a double and two home runs. He became the first Tigers player to go 5-for-5 with at least three extra-base hits and two home runs in a game since Dmitri Young in 2003, and the first Tigers shortstop to collect five hits in a game since Alan Trammell in 1987. He also was the first player to have five hits while playing for the first time in his home state since Ohio-born Pete Susko did so for the Washington Senators at Cleveland in 1934. Goodrum was placed on the 10-day injured list on August 24 due to an adductor strain. He did not return the rest of the season. For the year, Goodrum hit .248 with 12 home runs and 45 RBI in 423 at-bats.

Overall with the 2020 Detroit Tigers, Goodrum batted .184 with five home runs and 20 RBIs in 43 games.

On January 15, 2021, the Tigers and Goodrum agreed to a one-year, $2.1 million contract, avoiding arbitration. Goodrum played 90 games for the 2021 Tigers, batting .214 with 9 home runs, 33 RBI and 14 stolen bases. The Tigers removed Goodrum from the 40-man roster following the 2021 season. On November 19, 2021, Goodrum cleared waivers and elected free agency.

=== Houston Astros ===
On March 15, 2022, Goodrum signed a one-year, $2.1 million contract with the Houston Astros. He batted .116 in 15 games for Houston before they optioned him to the Sugar Land Space Cowboys of the Triple-A Pacific Coast League. On September 1, Goodrum was designated for assignment. He cleared waivers and became a free agent on September 3.

=== Boston Red Sox ===
On December 21, 2022, Goodrum signed a minor-league contract with the Boston Red Sox organization. He began the 2023 season with the Triple–A Worcester Red Sox, playing in 65 games and hitting .280/.448/.440 with 8 home runs, 36 RBI, and 7 stolen bases. On July 3, 2023, Goodrum exercised the opt–out clause in his contract and was released by the Red Sox.

=== Lotte Giants ===
On July 11, 2023, Goodrum signed a $400,000 contract with the Lotte Giants of the KBO League. In 50 games for the Giants, Goodrum hit .295/.373/.387 with no home runs and 28 RBI.

=== Tampa Bay Rays ===
On December 14, 2023, Goodrum signed a minor league contract with the Minnesota Twins. On March 27, 2024, after exercising the upward mobility clause in his contract, he was traded to the Tampa Bay Rays and added to their 40–man roster. In 9 games for the Rays, he went 3–for–16 (.188) with no home runs or RBI. Goodrum was designated for assignment by Tampa Bay on May 6.

=== Los Angeles Angels ===
On May 9, 2024, Goodrum was claimed off waivers by the Los Angeles Angels. In four games for the Angels, Goodrum went 0–for–13 with two walks and one stolen base.

On June 10, 2024, Goodrum was claimed off waivers by the Pittsburgh Pirates. He did not appear in a game for the organization before he was designated for assignment on June 14. Goodrum elected free agency after clearing waivers on June 17.

=== Baltimore Orioles ===
On June 28, 2024, Goodrum signed a minor league contract with the Baltimore Orioles. In 43 games for the Triple-A Norfolk Tides, he batted .291/.369/.466 with four home runs, 28 RBI, and six stolen bases. Goodrum elected free agency following the season on November 4.

=== New York Mets ===
On January 17, 2025, Goodrum signed a minor league contract with the San Diego Padres organization. He was released prior to the start of the season on March 21.

On April 2, 2025, Goodrum signed a minor league contract with the New York Mets. In 12 appearances for the Triple-A Syracuse Mets, he batted .229/.391/.400 with one home run, three RBI, and two stolen bases. On April 23, Goodrum retired from professional baseball.

== Personal life ==
Goodrum's father, Tim, played college football for Fort Valley State University.

On June 11, 2018, during the Flint water crisis, Goodrum donated 1,440 cases of water to support the residents of Flint.
