= José Cisnero =

Dominican American baseball player (born 1989)

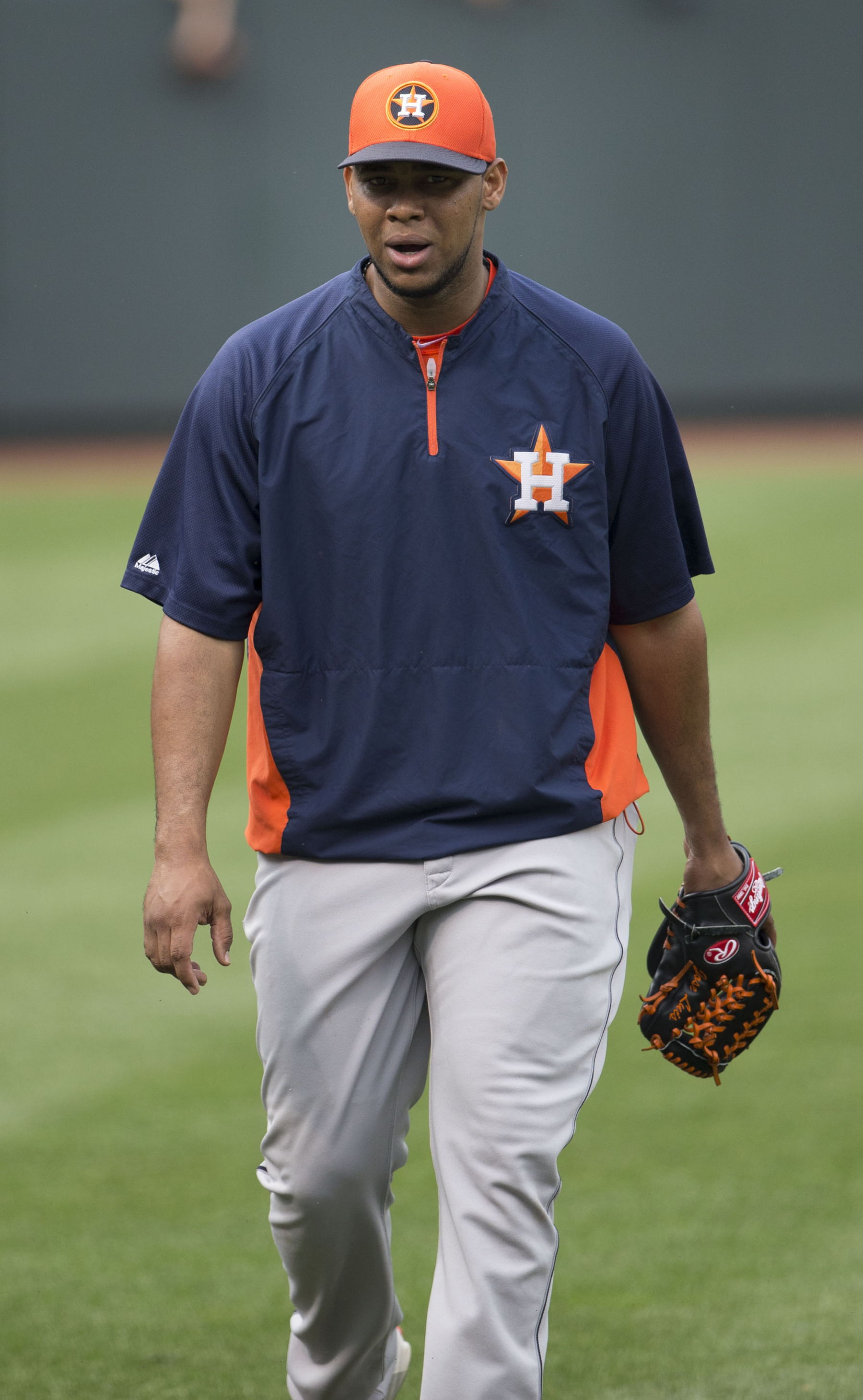
- Cisnero with the Houston Astros
- Pitcher
- Born: April 11, 1989 (age 37); Bajos de Haina, San Cristóbal, Dominican Republic
- Batted: Right Threw: Right

MLB debut
- April 22, 2013, for the Houston Astros

Last MLB appearance
- August 17, 2024, for the Los Angeles Angels

MLB statistics
- Win–loss record: 13–17
- Earned run average: 4.16
- Strikeouts: 292
- Stats at Baseball Reference

Teams
- Houston Astros (2013–2014); Detroit Tigers (2019–2023); Los Angeles Angels (2024)

José Luis Cisnero (born April 11, 1989) is a Dominican-American former professional baseball relief pitcher. He played in Major League Baseball (MLB) for the Houston Astros, Detroit Tigers, and Los Angeles Angels.

== Career ==
=== Houston Astros ===
Cisnero signed with the Houston Astros as an international free agent on December 6, 2007. On November 20, 2012, the Astros added Cisnero to their 40-man roster to protect him from the Rule 5 draft. He made his major league debut on April 22, 2013. In parts of two seasons for the Astros, he made 33 relief appearances, posting a 4.66 ERA with 46 strikeouts in 48 1/3 innings. On May 28, 2014, Cisnero underwent Tommy John surgery, ruling him out for the remainder of the season. He was outrighted off the roster on November 3, 2014, and subsequently became a free agent.

=== Cincinnati Reds ===
On November 18, 2014, Cisnero signed a minor league contract with the Cincinnati Reds organization. He made 4 appearances for the Double–A Pensacola Blue Wahoos in 2015, recording a 3.38 ERA with 6 strikeouts over 5 1/3 innings pitched. Cisnero elected free agency following the season on November 6, 2015.

=== Sultanes de Monterrey ===
On December 21, 2015, Cisnero signed a minor league contract with the Arizona Diamondbacks organization. He was released on March 31, 2016, after failing to make the team in spring training.

On May 3, 2016, Cisnero signed with the Sultanes de Monterrey of the Mexican League. In 13 appearances for the Sultanes, he posted a 5.25 ERA with 16 strikeouts and 1 save over 12 innings pitched. Cisnero was released by Monterrey on May 30.

=== New Jersey Jackals ===
On July 12, 2016, he signed with the New Jersey Jackals of the Can-Am League. He came out of the bullpen in 5 games and posted a 3.86 ERA before his release on July 25.

=== Detroit Tigers ===
On November 9, 2018, the Detroit Tigers signed Cisnero to a minor league contract with an invitation to spring training. He opened the 2019 season with the Toledo Mud Hens. On June 22, 2019, his contract was selected by the Tigers. He made his Tigers debut the next day, marking his first major league appearance in over five years. He finished the season with a 4.33 ERA in 35 games, and struck out 40 batters in 35 1/3 innings.

With the 2020 Detroit Tigers, Cisnero appeared in 29 games, compiling a 3–3 record with a 3.03 ERA and 34 strikeouts in 29 2/3 innings pitched.

On January 15, 2021, the Tigers and Cisnero agreed on a one-year, $970,000 contract, avoiding arbitration. Cisnero pitched mostly in a setup role for the 2021 Tigers, making occasional appearances as a closer. On September 13, he suffered an elbow laceration after slipping on stairs at his residence, requiring eight stitches. The Tigers placed him on the 10-day injured list September 14, and he did not return for the remainder of the season. In 2021, Cisnero made 67 relief appearances, posting a 4–4 record, 4 saves, and a 3.65 ERA, with 62 strikeouts in 61 2/3 innings.

On March 23, 2022, the Tigers and Cisnero agreed on a one-year contract worth $1.9 million, avoiding arbitration. On April 6, the Tigers placed Cisnero on the 60-day injured list with a right shoulder strain. The Tigers activated Cisnero on July 21, and he made his 2022 debut that evening against the Oakland Athletics. Cisnero pitched in 28 games for the 2022 Tigers, all in middle relief, posting a 1.08 ERA and 23 strikeouts in 25 innings.

On January 13, 2023, Cisnero agreed to a one-year, $2.2875 million contract with the Tigers, avoiding salary arbitration. On August 29, Cisnero has been placed on waivers. He ultimately went unclaimed and remained with the Tigers, finishing the season with a 3-4 record and an ERA of 5.31. On November 2, Cisnero elected free agency.

=== Los Angeles Angels ===
On February 3, 2024, Cisnero agreed to a one-year, $1.75 million contract with the Los Angeles Angels. He struggled to a 7.07 ERA across 14 games before he was placed on the injured list with right shoulder inflammation on April 28. Cisnero was transferred to the 60–day injured list on May 29. He was activated from the injured list on August 17, and pitched 1 2/3 innings for the Angels that day. The following day, Cisnero was designated for assignment by Los Angeles. He was released on August 22.

== Pitch selection ==
Cisnero throws both four-seam and sinking two-seam fastballs, each averaging 95 to 97 MPH (topping out at 100 MPH). His main offspeed pitch is a slider that averages 86 to 89 MPH. He also throws an occasional changeup averaging 89 to 90 MPH.
