= Faccani =

Faccani is an Italian surname from Emilia-Romagna. Notable people with the surname include:

- Clemente Faccani (1920–2011), Italian bishop and Vatican diplomat
- Roberta Faccani (born 1968), Italian singer and actress

== See also ==
- Faccini
- Villa Romeo Faccanoni
