= Cliff Pennington (baseball) =

American baseball player (born 1984)

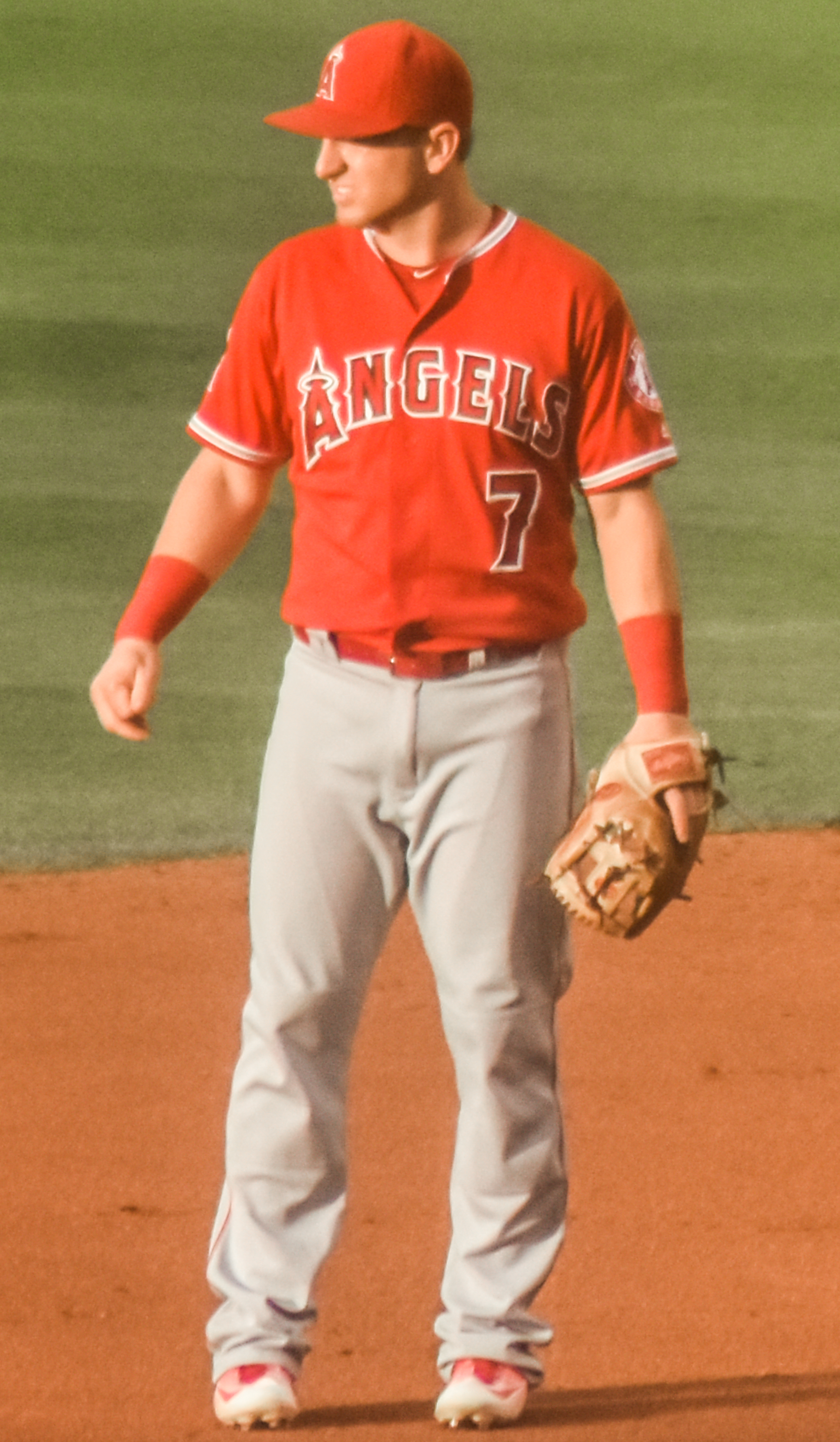
- Pennington with the Los Angeles Angels in 2016
- Shortstop / Second baseman
- Born: June 15, 1984 (age 41); Corpus Christi, Texas, U.S.
- Batted: Switch Threw: Right

MLB debut
- August 12, 2008, for the Oakland Athletics

Last MLB appearance
- April 25, 2018, for the Cincinnati Reds

MLB statistics
- Batting average: .242
- Home runs: 36
- Runs batted in: 242
- Stats at Baseball Reference

Teams
- Oakland Athletics (2008–2012); Arizona Diamondbacks (2013–2015); Toronto Blue Jays (2015); Los Angeles Angels (2016–2017); Cincinnati Reds (2018)

Clifton Randolph Pennington (born June 15, 1984) is an American former professional baseball infielder who played in Major League Baseball (MLB) for the Oakland Athletics, Arizona Diamondbacks, Toronto Blue Jays, Los Angeles Angels, and Cincinnati Reds between 2008 and 2018. In 2021 he was hired as the baseball recruiting coordinator for the Dallas Baptist Patriots.

== Amateur career ==
A native of Corpus Christi, Texas, Pennington played college baseball for the Texas A&M Aggies baseball team under head coach Mark Johnson from 2003 to 2005. In 2004, he played collegiate summer baseball with the Falmouth Commodores of the Cape Cod Baseball League, and was named to the league's Hall of Fame in 2020.

== Professional career ==
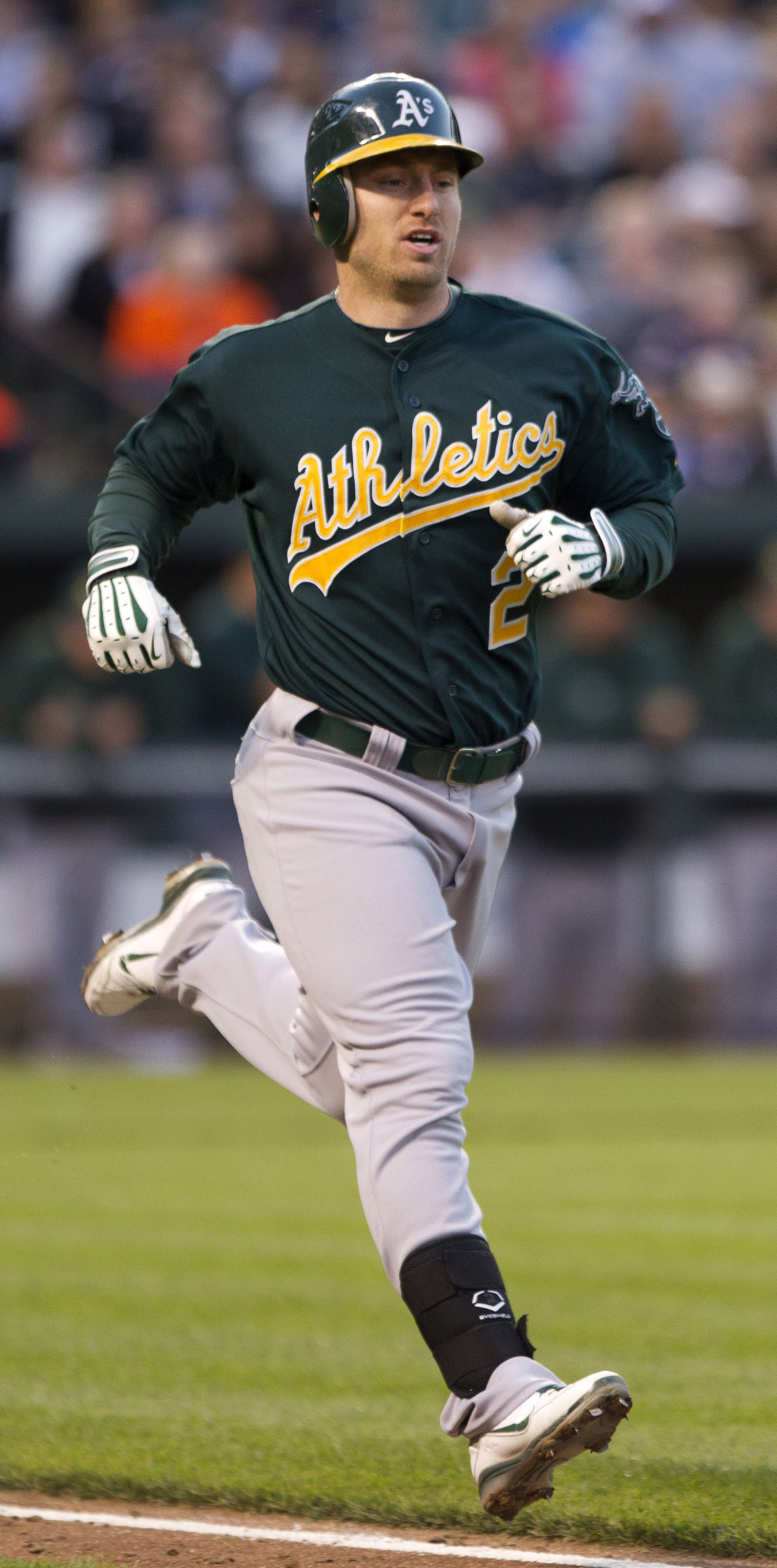
Pennington playing for the Oakland Athletics in 2012

=== Oakland Athletics ===
Pennington was drafted in the first round of the 2005 Major League Baseball draft by the Athletics. On August 12, 2008, he was called up from the Triple-A Sacramento River Cats, and made his Major League debut that day against the Tampa Bay Rays going 0-for-3 in a 2–1 win for the Athletics.

Pennington would end his 2008 season with a .280 batting average.

Following the 2009 spring training camp, he was returned to the River Cats.

On July 31, 2009, Pennington was called back up by the Athletics. He hit his first major league home run on August 5, against the Texas Rangers. He finished the 2009 season with 4 home runs, 21 RBIs, and a .249 batting average. He started the 2010 season in the starting role. He finished the season with 6 home runs and 46 RBI.

Pennington started slow in the 2011 season, averaging .160 in his first 10 games. On August 1, he left during a game against the Seattle Mariners, after having trouble moving his muscles in his face and moving his eyes. Later that day, Pennington was diagnosed with Bell's palsy, which paralyzes one side of the face and prevents him from controlling his muscles. Although Bell's palsy can last for days, weeks, or months, he was listed as day-to-day and only missed two games.

Near the end of the 2012 season, Pennington had started playing second base after the Athletics acquired Stephen Drew from the Arizona Diamondbacks to play every day shortstop, also due to the demotion of second baseman Jemile Weeks. Pennington went to the post season for the first time in his career as the Athletics won the AL West in 2012. They were eliminated in the ALDS by the Detroit Tigers in five games.

=== Arizona Diamondbacks ===
On October 20, 2012, Pennington was traded to the Arizona Diamondbacks with Heath Bell and cash considerations. Oakland received Chris Young and $500K from Arizona, and the Marlins received minor-league infielder Yordy Cabrera from Oakland. Pennington and the Diamondbacks agreed to a two-year contract worth $5 million on January 23, 2013. The contract was finalized on January 30.

On April 13, 2013, Pennington was ejected for the first time in his MLB career for arguing a correctly ruled strike three call made by umpire Jim Reynolds. In an 18 inning game on 24–25 August 2013 at the Philadelphia Phillies, Pennington walked five times, one shy of the Major League record. Teammate Tony Campana also walked five times. The teams drew a combined 28 bases on balls, a National League record. The Diamondbacks' 18 walks tied the National League mark. The game lasted seven hours and six minutes, the longest in franchise history for both clubs.

Pennington signed a one-year, $3.275 million deal in January 2014 and avoided arbitration.

=== Toronto Blue Jays ===
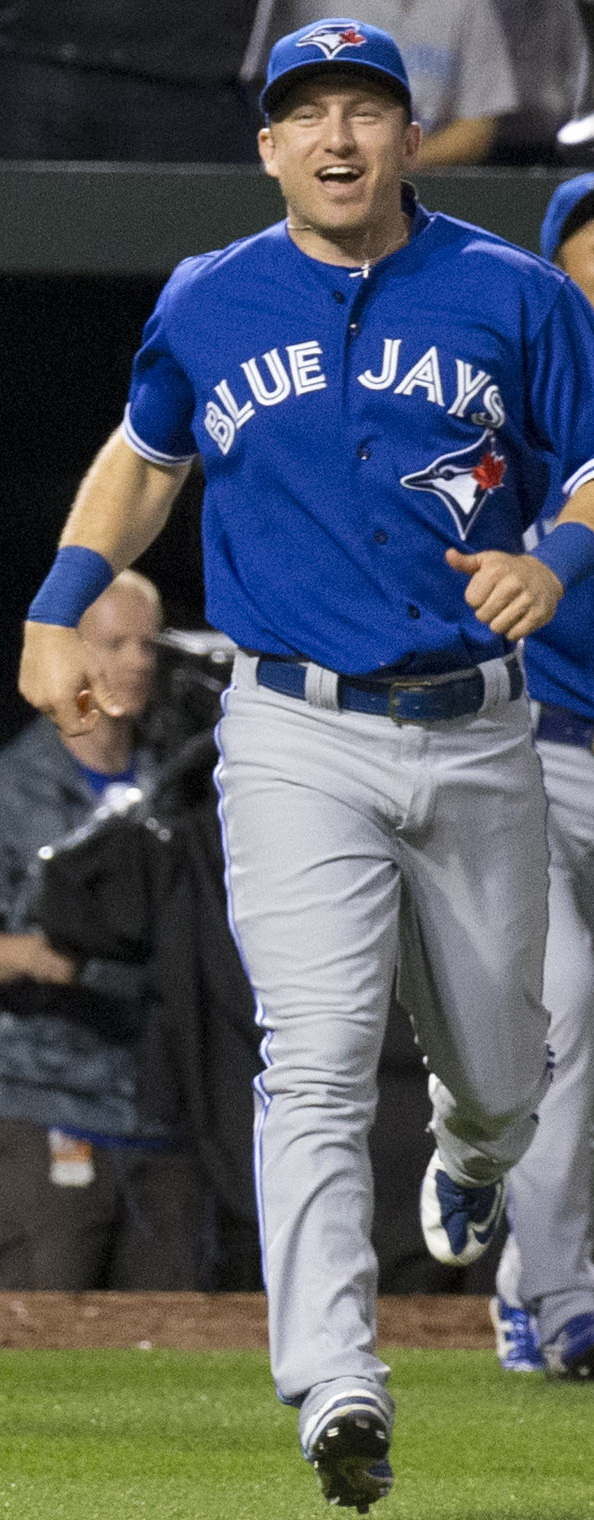
Pennington during his tenure with the Toronto Blue Jays in 2015

On August 8, 2015, Pennington was traded to the Toronto Blue Jays along with cash considerations for minor league shortstop Dawel Lugo. He batted .160 with 2 home runs and 11 RBI in 33 games played for the Blue Jays in 2015. In game 4 of the 2015 American League Championship Series, with two out in the ninth, Pennington became the first position player in Major League Baseball history to pitch in a postseason game, giving up two hits but recording the final out in a 14–2 loss to the Kansas City Royals.

=== Los Angeles Angels ===
On November 17, 2015, Pennington signed a two-year contract with the Los Angeles Angels.

=== Cincinnati Reds ===
On February 15, 2018, Pennington signed a minor league deal with the Cincinnati Reds. Pennington earned a spot on the Reds' Opening Day roster. On May 18, 2018, he asked for and was granted his release from the organization.

=== Texas Rangers ===
On May 19, 2018, Pennington signed a minor league deal with the Texas Rangers. In 61 games for the Triple–A Round Rock Express, hitting .204/.301/.282 with one home run and 13 RBI. Pennington elected free agency following the season on November 2.

=== Oakland Athletics (second stint) ===
On February 15, 2019, Pennington signed a minor league contract with the Oakland Athletics that included an invite to Spring Training. Pennigton was one of 28 Athletics selected to go to Tokyo to play two regular season games against the Seattle Mariners. Pennington was released on March 30, 2019.

=== New York Yankees ===
On April 5, 2019, Pennington signed a minor league contract with the New York Yankees. He was released on June 4, 2019.

== Coaching career ==
On July 17, 2019, he was hired as a student assistant coach by his alma mater, Texas A&M. Following the 2021 season, Pennington joined the coaching staff of the Dallas Baptist Patriots as recruiting coordinator. On June 4, 2025, Pennington was hired back by his alma mater, Texas A&M to coach infield defense as well as coach third base on offense.
