= Joe Jiménez =

Puerto Rican baseball player (born 1995)

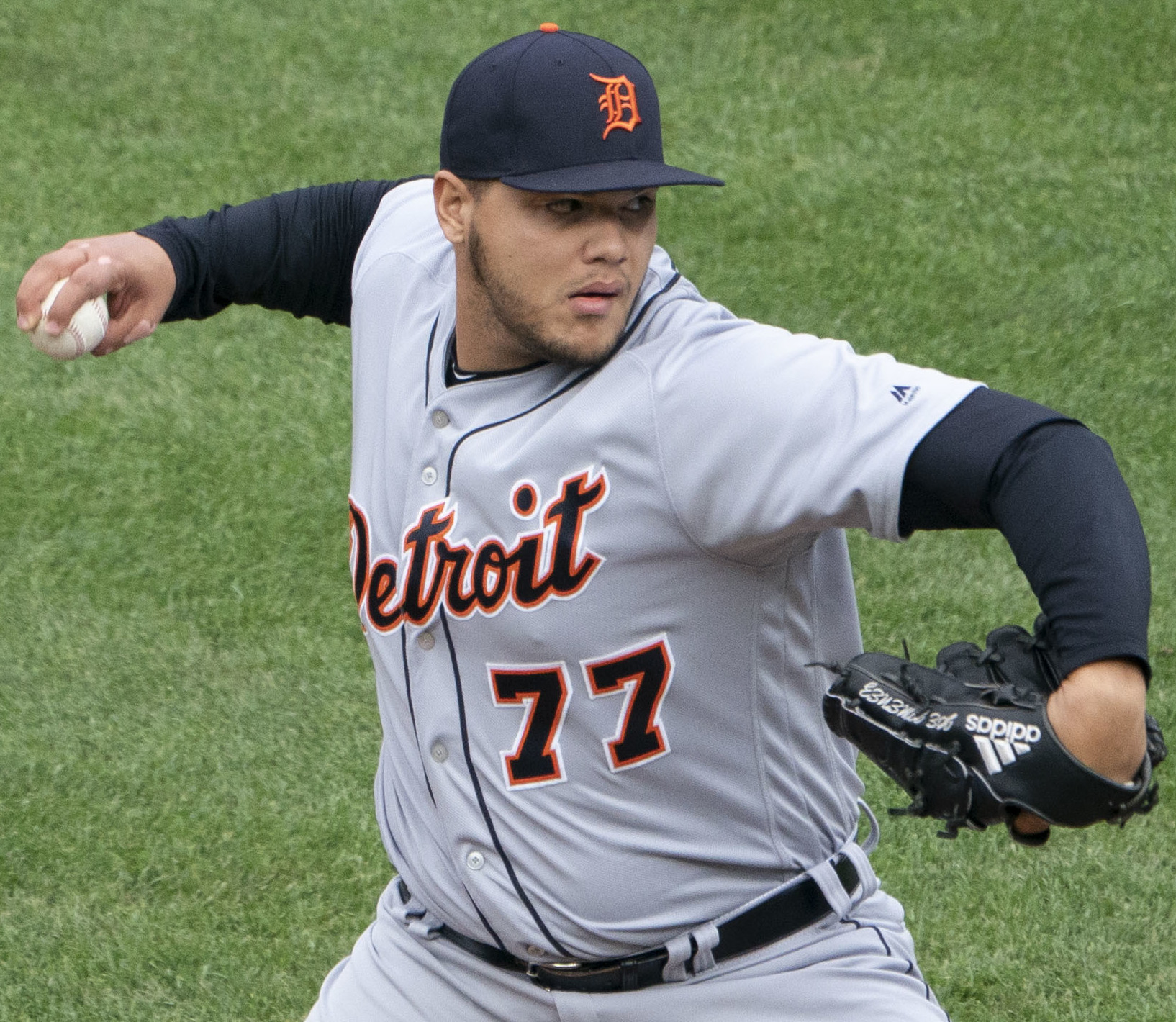
- Jiménez with Detroit Tigers in 2018

Free agent
- Pitcher
- Born: January 17, 1995 (age 31); San Juan, Puerto Rico
- Bats: Right Throws: Right

MLB debut
- April 13, 2017, for the Detroit Tigers

MLB statistics (through 2024 season)
- Win–loss record: 20–27
- Earned run average: 4.47
- Strikeouts: 488
- Saves: 23
- Stats at Baseball Reference

Teams
- Detroit Tigers (2017–2022); Atlanta Braves (2023–2024)

Career highlights and awards
- All-Star (2018)
Medals
Men's baseball
Representing Puerto Rico
World Baseball Classic
Silver medal – second place	2017 Los Angeles	National team

Joe Alexander Jiménez (born January 17, 1995) is a Puerto Rican professional baseball pitcher who is a free agent. He has played in Major League Baseball (MLB) for the Detroit Tigers and Atlanta Braves. He made his MLB debut with the Tigers in 2017 and was an All-Star in 2018.

== Professional career ==
=== Minor leagues (2013–2016) ===
Jiménez signed with the Detroit Tigers as an undrafted free agent out of the Puerto Rico Baseball Academy in June 2013. He made his professional debut that year with the Gulf Coast Tigers. He spent 2014 with the Connecticut Tigers and started 2015 with the West Michigan Whitecaps. During the 2015 season, Jiménez went 5–1 with a 1.47 ERA, a 0.791 WHIP and 17 saves in 40 appearances for West Michigan, and was named the Tigers Minor League Pitcher of the Year.

During the 2016 season, Jiménez pitched for the Lakeland Flying Tigers, Erie SeaWolves and the Toledo Mud Hens. In July, he pitched in the All-Star Futures Game. He had a 3–3 win–loss record with 30 saves, a 1.51 earned run average (ERA), 0.80 walks plus hits per inning pitched (WHIP), and a .144 batting average against with 78 strikeouts over 53 2/3 innings pitched. Jiménez was named the Tigers Minor League Pitcher of the Year. Jiménez began the 2017 season with the Mud Hens.

Jiménez played for the Puerto Rican national team in the 2017 World Baseball Classic prior to the 2017 season, where he won a silver medal.

=== Detroit Tigers (2017–2022) ===
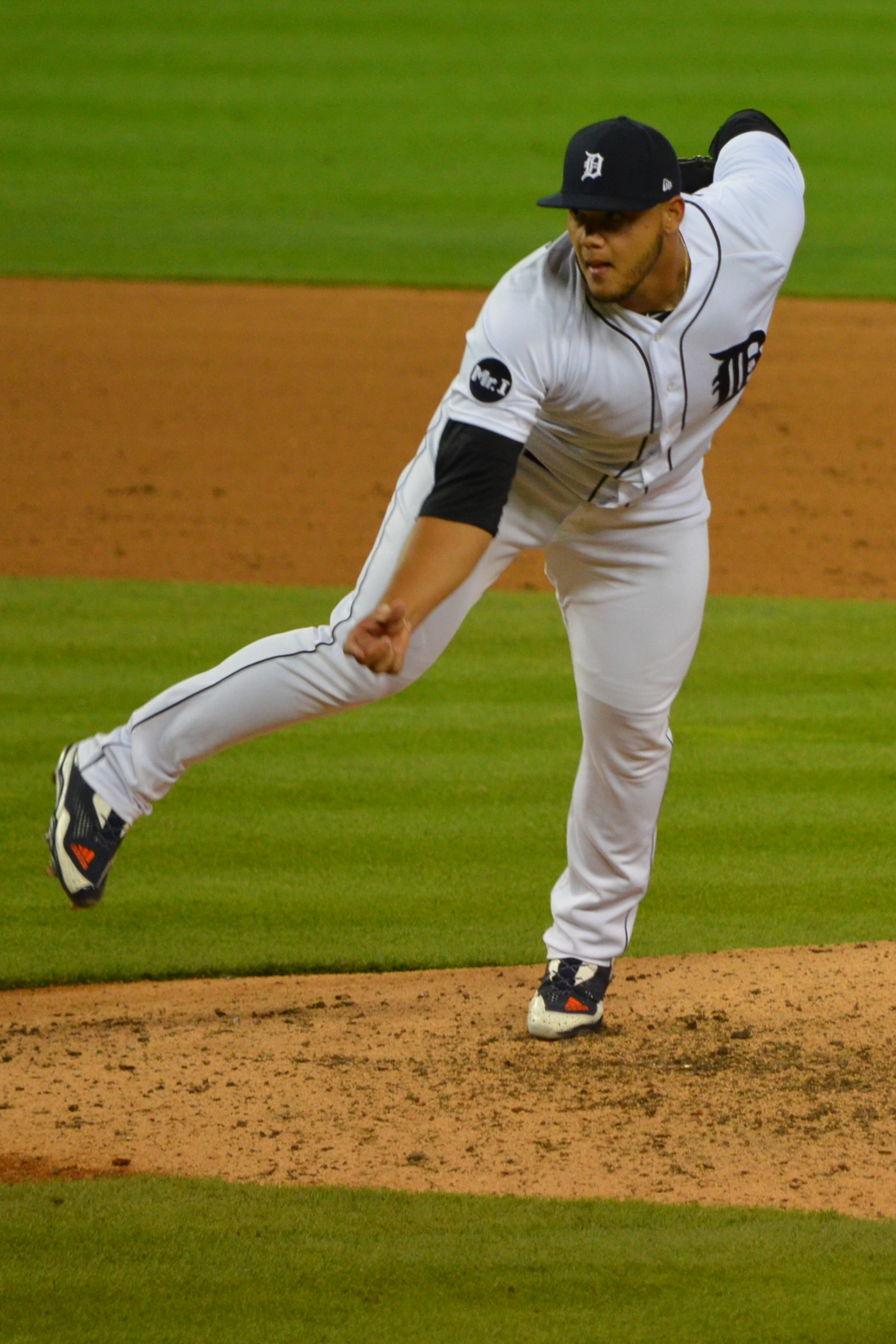
Jiménez in 2017

On April 10, 2017, the Detroit Tigers purchased Jiménez's contract, promoting him to the major league roster. He made his Major League debut for the Tigers on April 13 in a game against the Minnesota Twins, pitching a scoreless ninth inning, while recording one strikeout. He was optioned back to the Mud Hens after the game. Jiménez was called up again on July 31, 2017, after Justin Wilson was traded. In 24 games, he had an ERA of 12.32 in 19 innings.

Jiménez began the 2018 season in the Tigers bullpen, primarily filling a setup role. He earned his first major league save on June 2, pitching a 1-2-3 ninth inning against the Toronto Blue Jays. On July 8, 2018, Jiménez was selected to play in the 2018 All-Star Game, his first All-Star appearance. Through the All-Star break, Jiménez had a 2.72 ERA, 1.09 WHIP, 13 holds, 3 saves, and 48 strikeouts in 43 innings. Following the All-Star break, Jiménez had some struggles, posting a 7.78 ERA over the remainder of the season. He finished the season with a 5–4 record, 4.31 ERA, and 78 strikeouts in 62 2/3 innings, while appearing in a team-high 68 games.

Jiménez began the 2019 season in a setup role, but assumed the closer role for the Tigers following the July 31, 2019, trade of Shane Greene to the Atlanta Braves. He saved 9 games and posted a 4.37 ERA. Jiménez also struck out 82 batters in 59 2/3 innings for a career-high 12.4/9 IP strikeout rate. With the 2020 Detroit Tigers, Jiménez appeared in 25 games, compiling a 1–3 record with 7.15 ERA and 22 strikeouts in 22 2/3 innings pitched.

On January 15, 2021, the Tigers and Jiménez agreed to a one-year, $1.5 million contract, avoiding arbitration. On March 27, 2021, the Tigers optioned Jiménez to the team's alternate training site in Toledo. Before the Toledo Mud Hens season began, Jiménez was recalled to the Tigers on April 15. He was optioned back to Toledo on April 21, then recalled again on May 8. Jiménez made 52 relief appearances for the 2021 Tigers, posting a 6–1 record with a 5.96 ERA while striking out 57 batters in 45 1/3 innings.

On March 22, 2022, the Tigers and Jiménez agreed on a one-year contract worth $1.79 million, avoiding arbitration. He responded with one of his best seasons as a Tiger. Appearing mostly in middle relief, he made 62 appearances, posting a 3–2 record with a 3.49 ERA and 1.09 WHIP, while striking out 77 batters in 56 2/3 innings.

=== Atlanta Braves (2023–2026) ===
On December 7, 2022, the Tigers traded Jiménez to the Atlanta Braves in exchange for Justyn-Henry Malloy and Jake Higginbotham. On January 13, 2023, Jiménez signed a one-year, $2.765 million contract with the Braves, avoiding salary arbitration.

On November 2, 2023, Jiménez signed a three-year contract with the Braves worth $26 million. After a career high in innings pitched (68 2/3), alongside a 2.62 ERA and three saves during the 2024 season, Jiménez underwent surgery on his left knee, and was expected to miss at least eight months of the 2025 season.

On August 14, 2025, the Braves shut down Jiménez for the remainder of the 2025 season, ending his campaign without an appearance for the team. On November 19, it was reported that Jiménez had undergone a "cleanup" surgery on his left knee.

On February 10, 2026, Jiménez was placed on the 60-day injured list due to a left articular cartilage injury.

== Pitch selection ==
Jiménez mixes three primary pitches. He throws a four-seam fastball that averages 94 to 96 miles per hour (151 to 154 km/h), topping out at 99 miles per hour (159 km/h). His offspeed pitches include a slider that averages 84 to 86 miles per hour (135 to 138 km/h) and a changeup averaging 88 to 90 miles per hour (142 to 145 km/h).

== Personal life ==
Joe is the younger brother of former Texas Rangers catcher A. J. Jiménez.

== See also ==
- List of Major League Baseball players from Puerto Rico
