= Travis Demeritte =

American baseball player (born 1994)

Free agent
- Second baseman / Outfielder
- Born: September 30, 1994 (age 31); New York City, New York, U.S.
- Batted: Right Threw: Right

MLB debut
- August 3, 2019, for the Detroit Tigers

Last MLB appearance
- May 27, 2022, for the Atlanta Braves

MLB statistics
- Batting average: .216
- Home runs: 6
- Runs batted in: 20
- Stats at Baseball Reference

Teams
- Detroit Tigers (2019–2020); Atlanta Braves (2022)

Travis Timothy Demeritte (born September 30, 1994) is an American professional baseball second baseman and outfielder who is a free agent. He played in Major League Baseball (MLB) for the Detroit Tigers and Atlanta Braves.

== Career ==
=== Texas Rangers ===
Demeritte was drafted by the Texas Rangers in the first round of the 2013 Major League Baseball draft out of Winder-Barrow High School in Winder, Georgia. Demeritte made his professional debut with the Arizona League Rangers and spent all of 2013 there, batting .285 with four home runs and 20 RBIs in 39 games. In 2014, he played for the Hickory Crawdads where he batted .211 with 25 home runs and 66 RBIs in 118 games, and began playing second base regularly, having moved from his natural position as shortstop. In 2015, Demeritte returned to Hickory. That June, he tested positive for Furosemide, and was suspended for eighty games. While serving the suspension, Demeritte played in the Dominican Republic and for the Adelaide Bite of the Australian Baseball League, setting the league's single season record for games played (56) and strikeouts (60). Upon his return to Minor League Baseball, Demeritte was demoted to the Spokane Indians, where he finished the season. In 53 games between Hickory and Spokane he batted .232 with five home runs and 19 RBIs. Demeritte began 2016 with the High Desert Mavericks. In a June 2016 game, against the Rancho Cucamonga Quakes, Demeritte was hit by a pitch, an action which caused a bench-clearing brawl. The next month, he appeared in the All-Star Futures Game.

=== Atlanta Braves ===
On July 27, 2016, the Rangers traded Demeritte to the Braves for Lucas Harrell and Darío Álvarez. He was assigned to the Carolina Mudcats. In 123 games between High Desert and Carolina he slashed .266/.361/.554 with 28 home runs and 70 RBIs. During the 2016 offseason, Demeritte was assigned to the Salt River Rafters of the Arizona Fall League. He spent 2017 with the Mississippi Braves where he compiled a .231 batting average with 15 home runs and 45 RBIs in 124 games, and he returned to Mississippi in 2018, slashing .222/.316/.416 with 17 home runs and 63 RBIs in 128 games. During the 2018 season, Demeritte began playing the outfield. At the end of the season, Demeritte was named the Mississippi Braves player of the year. He began 2019 with the Gwinnett Stripers. At midseason, Demeritte was selected to the Triple-A All-Star Game.

=== Detroit Tigers ===
On July 31, 2019, Demeritte and pitcher Joey Wentz were traded to the Detroit Tigers in exchange for Shane Greene. At the time of the trade, he was hitting .286 with 24 home runs and 74 RBI for the Triple-A Gwinnett Stripers. On August 1, the Tigers selected Demeritte's contract and promoted him to the major leagues to take the place of outfielder Nicholas Castellanos, who was also traded on July 31.

==== 2019 ====
Demeritte made his major league debut on August 2 versus the Texas Rangers, hitting a triple off Lance Lynn for his first MLB hit. On August 8 against the Kansas City Royals, Demeritte hit his first major league home run off Josh Staumont. In 169 at-bats for the 2019 Tigers, Demeritte hit .225 with 3 home runs and 10 RBI.

==== 2020 ====
Demeritte started the 2020 season in the Tigers’ alternate training site, which replaced the minor leagues in the COVID-19 shortened season. He was called up from the training site on July 31, 2020, to replace an injured player. Overall with the 2020 Detroit Tigers, Demeritte batted .172 with no home runs and 4 RBIs in 18 games.

==== 2021 ====
On February 5, 2021, Demeritte was designated for assignment following the signing of Jonathan Schoop.

=== Atlanta Braves (second stint) ===
On February 12, 2021, Demeritte was claimed off waivers by the Atlanta Braves. On February 21, Demeritte was outrighted off of the 40-man roster and assigned to the Triple-A Gwinnett Stripers. Demeritte hit .282/.363/.575 with 21 home runs and 57 RBI in 81 games for Triple-A Gwinnett.

On November 6, 2021, the Braves selected Demeritte's contract to the 40-man roster, and on April 20, 2022, the Braves called Demeritte up from the minors. On April 29, Demeritte hit an inside-the-park home run against the Texas Rangers, the first inside-the-park home run in Globe Life Field history.

On August 16, 2022, Demeritte was designated for assignment. He cleared waivers and was sent outright to Triple-A Gwinnett on August 19. On October 17, Demeritte elected free agency.

=== Southern Maryland Blue Crabs ===
On July 14, 2024, Demeritte signed with the Southern Maryland Blue Crabs of the Atlantic League of Professional Baseball. In 22 games for the Blue Crabs, he slashed .221/.365/.351 with two home runs, five RBI, and two stolen bases. Demeritte was released by the team on August 25.

=== Charleston Dirty Birds ===
On April 24, 2025, Demeritte signed with the Charleston Dirty Birds of the Atlantic League of Professional Baseball. In 83 appearances for the Dirty Birds, he batted .232/.311/.377 with eight home runs, 33 RBI, and 10 stolen bases. Demeritte was released by Charleston on August 19.

== Personal life ==
Demeritte's parents, Trent Demeritte and Felecia Rodgers, live in Winder, Georgia.
