= Leo Bonfim =

Brazilian footballer (born 1983)

Léo Bonfim
Personal information
- Full name: Leonardo Augusto Bonifácio
- Date of birth: 14 January 1983 (age 43)
- Place of birth: Foz do Iguaçu, Brazil
- Height: 1.86 m (6 ft 1 in)
- Position: Centre back

Team information
- Current team: Salgueiros 08

Youth career
- 1997–1998: Cruzeiro
- 1998–2001: Vila Nova

Senior career*
Years	Team	Apps	(Gls)
2002–2005	Serra FC		
2006	Portuguesa		
2007	Ceará		
2007–2008	Vitória Setúbal	1	(0)
2008–2009	Gondomar	7	(0)
2009–2010	Olimpija Ljubljana	19	(2)
2010–2012	Boavista	31	(1)
2012–2013	Naval	5	(0)
2013–	Salgueiros 08	23	(1)
- * Club domestic league appearances and goals as of 6 July 2014

Leonardo Augusto Bonifácio (born 14 January 1983 in Foz do Iguaçu, Paraná), commonly known as Léo Bonfim, is a Brazilian professional footballer who plays for S.C. Salgueiros 08 in Portugal as central defender.

== Football career ==
After playing youth football for Cruzeiro Esporte Clube and Vila Nova Futebol Clube, Léo Bonfim began his senior career in 2002 with amateurs Sociedade Desportiva Serra Futebol Clube. Four years later, he competed with Associação Portuguesa de Desportos in the Série B, remaining in the same division in the next season, with Ceará Sporting Club.

During the winter transfer window of 2007–08, Portuguese top level team Vitória de Setúbal brought Bonfim to his ranks. After only one league match during the entire campaign, he left for another team in the country, second division's Gondomar SC.

In the 2009 summer, Bonfim signed with NK Olimpija Ljubljana in the Slovenian First League, but after one season, he returned to Portugal, joining Boavista F.C. in level three.
