= Eric Haase =

American baseball player (born 1992)

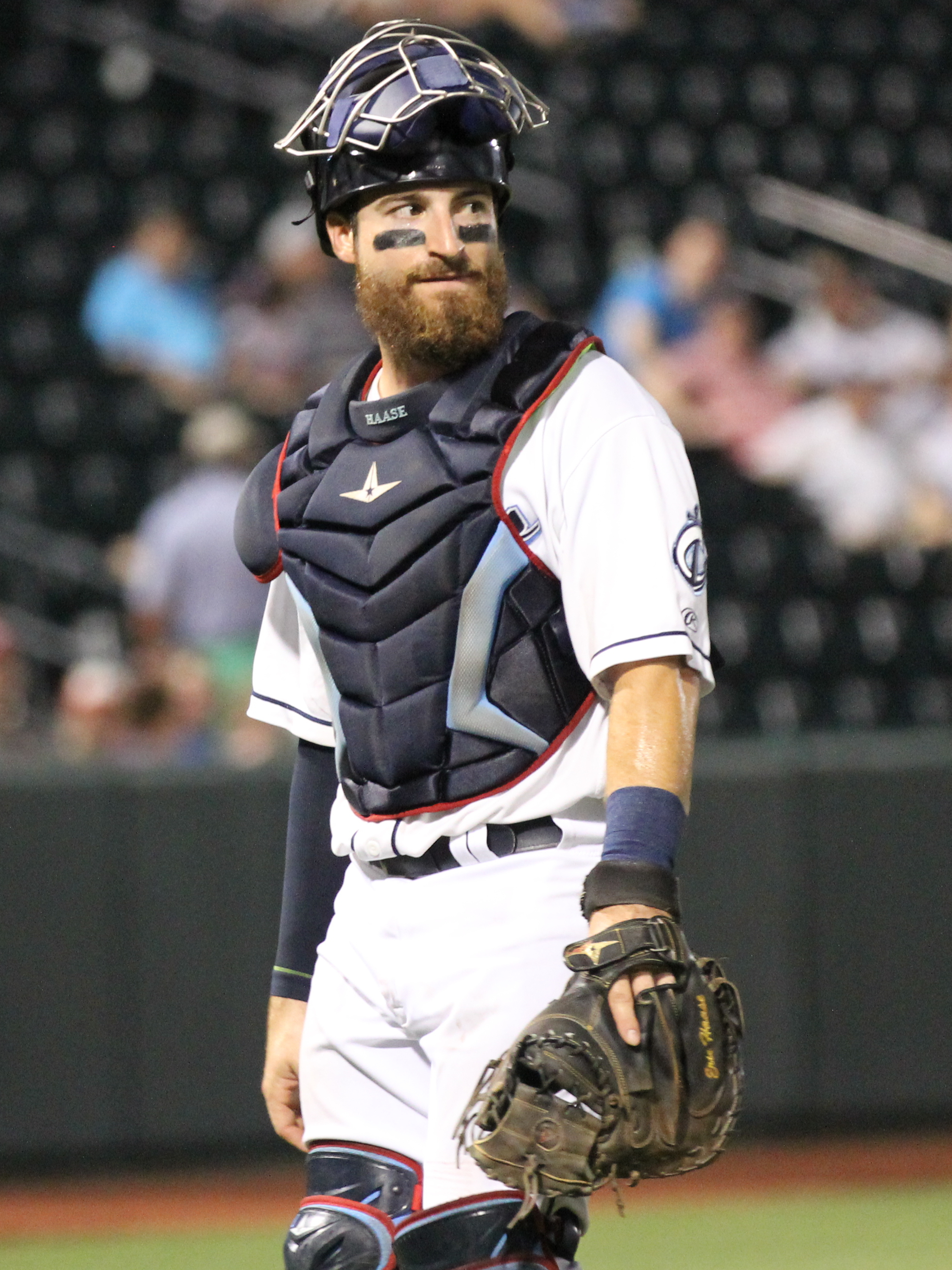
- Haase with the Columbus Clippers in 2018

Free agent
- Catcher
- Born: December 18, 1992 (age 33); Detroit, Michigan, U.S.
- Bats: Right Throws: Right

MLB debut
- September 2, 2018, for the Cleveland Indians

MLB statistics (through 2026 season)
- Batting average: .224
- Home runs: 52
- Runs batted in: 169
- Stats at Baseball Reference

Teams
- Cleveland Indians (2018–2019); Detroit Tigers (2020–2023); Cleveland Guardians (2023); Milwaukee Brewers (2024–2025); San Francisco Giants (2026)

Eric Michael Haase (/hɒs/; born December 18, 1992) is an American professional baseball catcher who is a free agent. He has previously played in Major League Baseball (MLB) for the Cleveland Indians / Guardians, Detroit Tigers, Milwaukee Brewers, and San Francisco Giants.

== Early life ==
Haase was born on December 18, 1992, in Detroit, Michigan, to Don and Lori Haase. He grew up in the Detroit suburb of Westland and practiced baseball in his childhood home. Haase's father converted a 12-car pole barn into a practice batting cage where his son could take batting practice and work on becoming a power hitter. Growing up, Haase and his family supported the Detroit Tigers of Major League Baseball (MLB); Haase's favorite player was catcher Lance Parrish.

In 2008, Haase's freshman year at Divine Child High School in Dearborn, Michigan, he did not originally make the varsity team, but Haase was included on the roster when Divine Child went to the state playoffs. Used mostly as a courtesy runner, Haase saw his first state high school baseball championship that year. He won another state championship with Divine Child as a junior in 2010, this time predominantly playing third base. That year, he batted .454 with eight home runs, 15 doubles, and 47 runs batted in (RBIs). During his senior year, Gatorade named Haase their High School Baseball Player of the Year for the state of Michigan. He was also named Michigan's Mr. Baseball in 2011, after batting .495 with 14 home runs and 54 RBIs.

== Professional career ==
=== Cleveland Indians (2011–2019) ===
==== Minor leagues ====
The Cleveland Indians selected Haase out of high school in the seventh round, 218th overall, of the 2011 MLB draft. He had previously committed to play college baseball for the Ohio State Buckeyes, but chose to forgo that commitment in favor of accepting the Indians' $580,000 signing bonus. Primarily drafted as a catcher, the team was also interested in giving Haase time at third base. He began his professional baseball career with the Rookie-level Arizona Fall League (AZL) Indians, batting .300 with two RBI in four games and 10 at bats.

Haase spent the bulk of the 2012 season in the Arizona League as well, batting .282 with three home runs and 22 RBI in 28 games and 109 plate appearances. He also appeared in three games with the Low–A Mahoning Valley Scrappers, scoring one hit. From there, Haase spent the entire 2013 season with the Single–A Lake County Captains, hitting 14 home runs in 104 games. He spent the 2013-14 offseason working on strength training and his defensive abilities, and when he returned to Lake County for the 2014 season, Haase's coaches praised his ability to block balls and call games from behind the plate.

After starting the 2014 season with Lake County, Haase received a midseason call-up to the Double-A Carolina Mudcats, with whom he hit .185 with four runs, one home run, and six RBI in 16 games. Haase remained in the Carolina League the following year, as Cleveland changed its Double-A affiliate from the Mudcats to the Lynchburg Hillcats. He started the 2015 season there in a slump before hitting a walk-off home run in the 10th inning of a game against the Wilmington Blue Rocks on June 11. In 90 games with Lynchburg in 2015, Haase batted .247 with nine home runs and 55 RBI. Defensively, he started 87 games at catcher and threw out 31 percent of attempted base stealers.

Haase spent the 2016 season with the Double–A Akron RubberDucks, hitting 12 home runs and 33 RBI. He split the 2017 season between Akron and the Triple–A Columbus Clippers, combining to hit 27 home runs and 61 RBI.

On November 6, 2017, the Indians added Haase to their 40-man roster to protect him from the Rule 5 draft.

==== Major leagues ====
Haase spent the 2018 minor league season with Columbus, hitting .236/.288/.443/.731 with 20 home runs and 71 RBI. The Indians promoted Haase to the major leagues for the first time on September 1, 2018. He made his major league debut the next day. He hit .125 in 16 major league at bats.

Haase opened the 2019 season back with Columbus. He hit his first major league home run on September 28, 2019. In 10 appearances for the Indians, Haase went 1-for-16 (.063) with one home run and three RBI. He was designated for assignment by Cleveland following the signing of César Hernández on December 29.

=== Detroit Tigers (2020–2023) ===
On January 8, 2020, the Indians traded Haase to the Detroit Tigers in exchange for cash considerations. For the start of the shortened 2020 MLB season, Haase was chosen to be a part of the Detroit Tigers' taxi squad. On September 15, Haase was recalled by the Tigers. On the year with the Tigers, Haase batted .176 with no home runs and two RBI across seven appearances.

On December 23, 2020, Haase was designated for assignment following the signing of José Ureña. On January 6, 2021, he cleared waivers and was sent outright to Triple-A Toledo Mud Hens. The Tigers selected Haase to their active roster on May 12. He made his season debut on May 13, and went 2-for-4 at the plate. On May 17, Haase had the first multi-homer game of his career, hitting a pair of solo home runs against the Seattle Mariners. The next night (May 18), Haase caught Spencer Turnbull's no-hitter against the Mariners, the eighth in Tigers history. On July 27, Haase hit his first career grand slam home run off Hansel Robles of the Minnesota Twins. The slam tied the game at 5–5 in the ninth inning, and the Tigers went on to win in the eleventh inning. With Minnesota's Mitch Garver also hitting a grand slam earlier in this game, it marked the first time in MLB history that opposing catchers hit grand slams in the same game.

On August 2, 2021, Haase was named American League Rookie of the Month for July. He became the first Tiger to win the award since Brennan Boesch in 2010. In July, Haase posted a .265 average and a .627 slugging percentage, with nine home runs and 29 RBIs. Overall in 2021, Haase had 22 home runs in 98 games played, while batting .231 and driving in 61 runs. Behind the plate, he threw out 31% of potential base stealers, versus a league average of 23%.

In 2022, Haase made the first Opening Day roster of his major league career. On Opening Day, April 8, he hit a game-tying ninth-inning home run against the Chicago White Sox. The Tigers won the game later in the inning on a walk-off single by Javier Báez. On July 25, Haase hit his second career grand slam off of Sean Manaea of the San Diego Padres. On September 7 against the Los Angeles Angels, Haase recorded his first career five-hit game, going 5-for-5 at the plate with two singles, two doubles and a home run.

In 2023, Haase struggled at the plate for Detroit, hitting .201 with four home runs and 26 RBI in 86 games. On August 19, 2023, he was designated for assignment after the team signed Carson Kelly.

=== Cleveland Guardians (2023) ===
On August 21, 2023, the Cleveland Guardians claimed Haase off waivers from Detroit. He went 2–for–10 (.200) in 3 games prior to being designated for assignment on August 31. After clearing waivers, Haase was outrighted to the Triple-A Columbus Clippers on September 3. On October 3, Haase elected free agency.

=== Milwaukee Brewers (2024–2025) ===
On December 20, 2023, Haase signed a one-year contract with the Milwaukee Brewers. Despite a strong spring training, Haase was designated for assignment after failing to make the Opening Day roster on March 28, 2024. He cleared waivers and was sent outright to the Triple–A Nashville Sounds on April 1. On June 26, the Brewers selected Haase's contract, adding him to their active roster. He played in 30 games for Milwaukee on the year, slashing .273/.304/.515 with five home runs and 14 RBI. At the end of the season, the Brewers declined the option on Haase's contract. He elected free agency on October 14.

Haase made 30 appearances for the Brewers in 2025, batting .229/.289/.357 with two home runs and nine RBI. On July 28, 2025, he was designated for assignment after the team traded for Danny Jansen. Haase elected free agency on October 14.

=== San Francisco Giants (2026) ===
On January 9, 2026, Haase signed a minor league contract with the San Francisco Giants. He was released by the Giants organization prior to the start of the regular season on March 25. On April 1, Haase re-signed with the Giants on a minor league contract. He made nine appearances for the Triple-A Sacramento River Cats, batting .250 with two home runs and eight RBI. Following an injury to Daniel Susac, the Giants added Haase to their active roster on April 21. He made 29 appearances for San Francisco, batting .162/.235/.365 with four home runs and nine RBI. Haase was designated for assignment on July 17, following Susac’s return from the IL. He cleared waivers and was released by the team on July 23.

=== Chicago White Sox (2026) ===
On July 28, 2026, Haase signed a minor league contract with the Chicago White Sox. In seven games for the Triple–A Charlotte Knights, Haase hit .360/.467/.560 with one home run and eight RBI. On August 13, Haase was released by the White Sox.

=== Atlanta Braves (2026–present) ===
On September 1, 2026, Haase signed a minor league contract with the Atlanta Braves. He did not make an appearance for the organization prior to the conclusion of the regular season. He elected free agency on November 2.

== Personal life ==
Haase and his wife, Maria, met when they were high school freshmen. They have four children.
