= Jorge Bonifacio =

Dominican-American baseball player (born 1993)

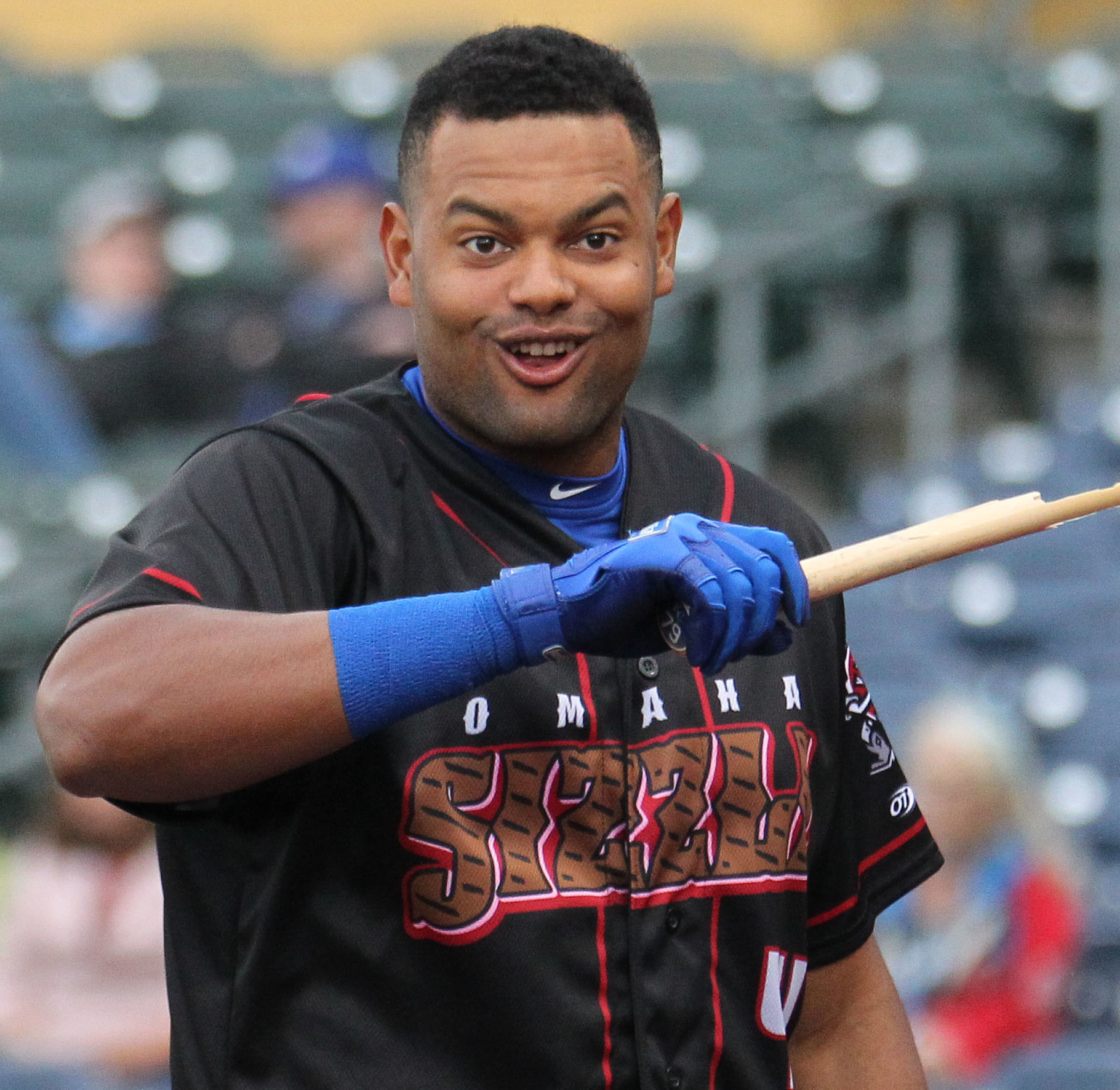
- Bonifacio with the Omaha Storm Chasers

Long Island Ducks – No. 41
- Outfielder
- Born: June 4, 1993 (age 32); Santo Domingo, Dominican Republic
- Bats: Right Throws: Right

MLB debut
- April 21, 2017, for the Kansas City Royals

MLB statistics (through 2021 season)
- Batting average: .241
- Home runs: 23
- Runs batted in: 84
- Stats at Baseball Reference

Teams
- Kansas City Royals (2017–2019); Detroit Tigers (2020); Philadelphia Phillies (2021)

Jorge Luis Bonifacio (born June 4, 1993) is a Dominican-American professional baseball outfielder for the Long Island Ducks of the Atlantic League of Professional Baseball. He has previously played in Major League Baseball (MLB) for the Kansas City Royals, Detroit Tigers, and Philadelphia Phillies.

== Career ==
=== Kansas City Royals ===
The Kansas City Royals signed Bonifacio as an international free agent in 2009. He played for the Kane County Cougars of the Single–A Midwest League, and appeared in the Midwest League All-Star Game. In 2013, Bonifacio began the season with the Wilmington Blue Rocks of the High–A Carolina League. In the final weeks of the season, the Royals promoted Bonifacio to the Northwest Arkansas Naturals of the Double–A Texas League. After the season, they assigned him to the Peoria Javelinas of the Arizona Fall League. He was named to the Fall Stars Game.

The Royals invited Bonifacio to spring training in 2014. He played for the Naturals in 2014 and in 2015. He spent the 2016 season with the Omaha Storm Chasers of the Triple–A Pacific Coast League, and was selected to appear in the 2016 All-Star Futures Game.

Bonifacio began the 2017 season with Omaha. The Royals promoted him to the major leagues on April 21, 2017. He recorded his first major league hit and home run on April 23.

On March 10, 2018, Bonifacio was suspended 80 games without pay after testing positive for boldenone an anabolic steroid derived from testosterone. He returned in the second half of the season but struggled, hitting .225 with four home runs and 23 RBI.

On November 20, 2019, Bonifacio was designated for assignment after multiple prospects were added to the roster. He was released by the organization on November 25.

=== Detroit Tigers ===
On December 7, 2019, the Detroit Tigers signed Bonifacio to a minor league contract that included an invitation to spring training. On August 19, 2020, the Tigers purchased Bonifacio's contract and inserted him into the lineup. Overall with the 2020 Detroit Tigers, Bonifacio batted .221 with two home runs and 17 RBI in 30 games. On October 27, Bonifacio was outrighted off of the 40-man roster. He became a free agent on November 2.

On April 12, 2021, it was reported that Bonifacio had signed with the Mariachis de Guadalajara of the Mexican League. However the next day, Bonifacio's representatives noted that Bonifacio had not signed with the club and was still a free agent.

=== Philadelphia Phillies ===
On May 25, 2021, Bonifacio signed a minor league contract with the Philadelphia Phillies organization and was assigned to the Double-A Reading Fightin Phils. Bonifacio hit .251 with 12 home runs and 41 RBIs in 49 games for Double-A Reading, leading to his promoting to the Triple-A Lehigh Valley IronPigs on July 22. After hitting .321 with three home runs and 13 RBIs for Triple-A Lehigh Valley, the Phillies selected Bonifacio's contract on August 20. After going 0-for-3 for the Phillies, Bonifacio was designated for assignment on August 24. On August 25, Bonifacio cleared waivers and was assigned outright to Triple-A Lehigh Valley. On August 27, after Zach Eflin, Luke Williams, and Andrew Knapp were placed on the COVID-19 list, the Phillies re-selected Bonifacio's contract. On September 3, Bonifacio was returned to Lehigh Valley and removed from the 40-man roster. On October 8, Bonifacio elected free agency.

On March 30, 2022, Bonifacio re-signed with the Phillies on a minor league contract. He played in 112 games for Triple-A Lehigh, slashing .240/.336/.407 with 15 home runs, 57 RBI, and eight stolen bases. Bonifacio elected free agency following the season on November 10.

=== Kansas City Royals (second stint) ===
On March 9, 2023, Bonifacio signed a minor league contract with the Kansas City Royals organization. He played in 118 games for the Double–A Northwest Arkansas Naturals, hitting .267/.354/.483 with 22 home runs and 88 RBI. Bonifacio elected free agency following the season on November 6.

=== Olmecas de Tabasco ===
On February 21, 2024, Bonifacio signed with the Olmecas de Tabasco of the Mexican League. In 34 games for Tabasco, Bonifacio batted .195/.315/.390 with six home runs and 17 RBI.

=== Saraperos de Saltillo ===
On June 12, 2024, Bonifacio was traded to the Saraperos de Saltillo of the Mexican League. In 15 games for the Saraperos, he hit .229/.309/.458 with two home runs and nine RBI. Bonifacio was released by Saltillo on July 3.

=== Kansas City Monarchs ===
On February 25, 2025, Bonifacio signed with the Kansas City Monarchs of the American Association of Professional Baseball. Bonifacio made 96 appearances for the Monarchs, batting .259/.352/.448 with 17 home runs, 52 RBI, and seven stolen bases. He became a free agent following the season.

=== Long Island Ducks ===
On February 13, 2026, Bonifacio signed with El Águila de Veracruz of the Mexican League. However, on March 10, Bonifacio signed with the Cleburne Railroaders of the American Association of Professional Baseball. On April 14, Bonifacio was traded to the Long Island Ducks of the Atlantic League of Professional Baseball in exchange for a player to be named later.

== Personal life ==
Bonifacio is the younger brother of Emilio Bonifacio. Bonifacio became a U.S. citizen in November 2025.
