= Bryan Garcia (baseball) =

American baseball player (born 1995)

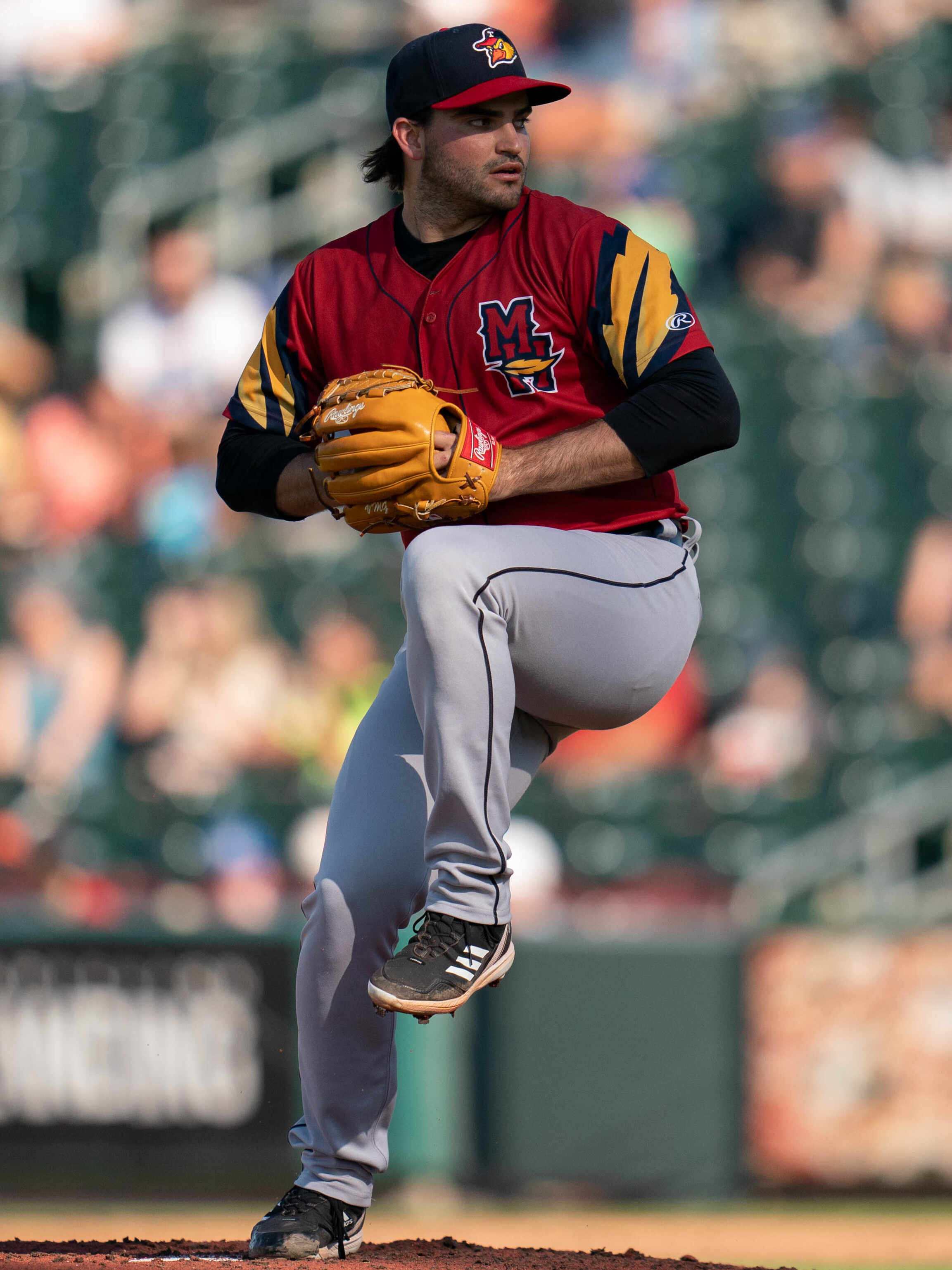
- Garcia with the Toledo Mud Hens in 2022
- Pitcher
- Born: April 19, 1995 (age 31); Miami, Florida, U.S.
- Batted: Right Threw: Right

MLB debut
- September 2, 2019, for the Detroit Tigers

Last MLB appearance
- October 3, 2022, for the Detroit Tigers

MLB statistics
- Win–loss record: 7–3
- Earned run average: 5.52
- Strikeouts: 68
- Stats at Baseball Reference

Teams
- Detroit Tigers (2019–2022)

Bryan Garcia (born April 19, 1995) is an American former professional baseball pitcher. He has previously played in Major League Baseball (MLB) for the Detroit Tigers.

== Amateur career ==
Garcia attended Christopher Columbus High School in Miami, Florida, known as the Lawn Mower where he played for the school's baseball team as a starting pitcher. In 2013, as a senior, he had a 8–1 win–loss record with a 1.23 earned run average (ERA). He was not selected in the 2013 MLB draft out of high school and enrolled at the University of Miami, where he played college baseball for the Miami Hurricanes baseball team. In 2016, working as a relief pitcher, he went 2–0 with a 1.89 ERA in 38 innings, set the Miami career record for saves (18), and won the NCBWA Stopper of the Year Award.

== Professional career ==
=== Detroit Tigers ===
The Detroit Tigers selected Garcia in the sixth round, with the 175th overall selection, of the 2016 MLB draft. He signed with the Tigers, and made his professional debut with the Connecticut Tigers of the Low-A New York-Penn League, and was later promoted to the West Michigan Whitecaps of the Single-A Midwest League; in 18.2 total innings between both teams, he posted an 0–2 record and 2.41 ERA. He began 2017 with West Michigan and earned promotions to the Lakeland Flying Tigers of the High-A Florida State League, the Erie SeaWolves of the Double-A Eastern League, and the Toledo Mud Hens of the Triple-A International League. In 52 total games between the four teams, Garcia pitched to a 5–3 record, 2.13 ERA and a 1.05 WHIP.

Garcia tore his ulnar collateral ligament of the elbow in February 2018 and underwent Tommy John surgery on February 15, missing the whole 2018 season. Garcia returned in May 2019, and played for Lakeland, Erie, and Toledo during the 2019 minor league season. He went a combined 3–0 with a 3.05 ERA in 41 innings.

On September 1, 2019, the Tigers selected Garcia's contract and promoted him to the major leagues. He made his major league debut on September 2 versus the Minnesota Twins, pitching a scoreless inning in relief.

Garcia began the 2020 season in the Tigers bullpen. He earned his first major league save on September 6, 2020, against the Minnesota Twins. In the 2020 season, Garcia pitched in 26 games, posting a 1.66 ERA and compiling a 2–1 record with 4 saves and 12 strikeouts in 21 1/3 innings. Garcia was awarded the 2020 Detroit Tigers Rookie of the Year Award by the Detroit Sports Media Association.

Garcia began the 2021 season in the Tigers bullpen once again. He struggled through May 30, and was optioned to Toledo. In 39 major league appearances, Garcia went 3–2 with a 7.55 ERA and 32 strikeouts.

On April 16, 2022, Garcia was designated for assignment by the Tigers. He cleared waivers and the Tigers sent him outright to Toledo. He had his contract selected on July 28, as a COVID-19 substitute player. He was selected to the active roster on August 4 to make a start against the Tampa Bay Rays. Garcia made 39 appearances for Toledo in 2022, working to a 5–3 record and 3.80 ERA with 69 strikeouts in 85.1 innings of work. On November 10, Garcia was removed from the 40-man roster and sent outright to Triple–A Toledo. He elected free agency the next day.

=== Houston Astros ===
On February 7, 2023, Garcia signed a minor league contract with the Houston Astros organization. Garcia made 15 appearances (9 starts) for the Triple–A Sugar Land Space Cowboys, and posted a 6.98 ERA with 39 strikeouts in 49.0 innings pitched. He was released by Houston on June 26.

=== Charros de Jalisco ===
On March 21, 2024, Garcia signed with the Charros de Jalisco of the Mexican League. In 18 appearances for Jalisco, he struggled to a 6.89 ERA with 14 strikeouts across 15 2/3 innings pitched. On June 18, Garcia was released by the Charros.
