= Dawel Lugo =

Dominican baseball player (born 1994)

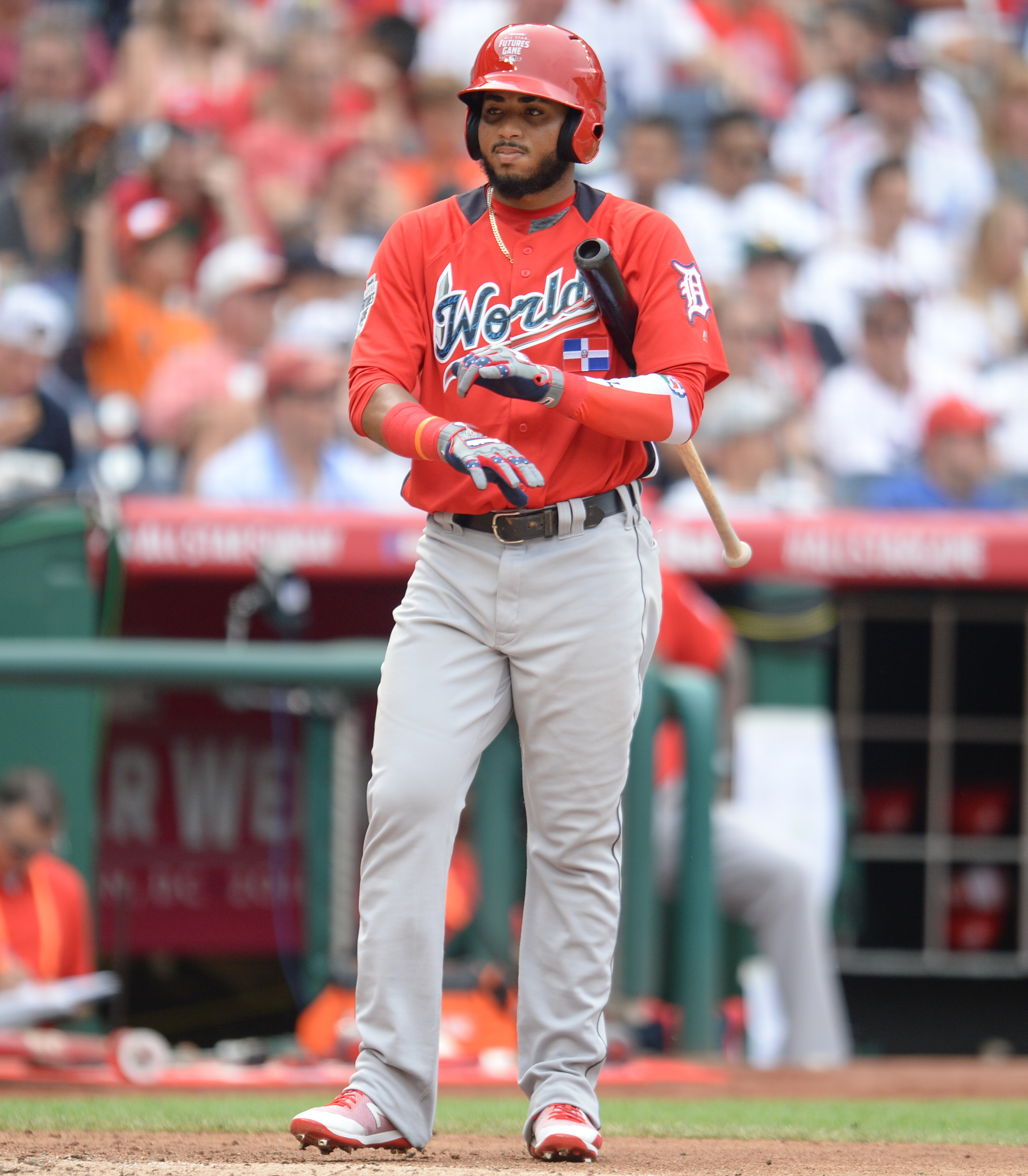
- Lugo at the 2018 All-Star Futures Game

Free agent
- Infielder
- Born: December 31, 1994 (age 31); Baní, Peravia, Dominican Republic
- Bats: Right Throws: Right

MLB debut
- August 30, 2018, for the Detroit Tigers

MLB statistics (through 2020 season)
- Batting average: .236
- Home runs: 7
- Runs batted in: 35
- Stats at Baseball Reference

Teams
- Detroit Tigers (2018–2020)

Dawel Leoner Lugo Baez (born December 31, 1994) is a Dominican professional baseball infielder who is a free agent. He has previously played in Major League Baseball (MLB) for the Detroit Tigers.

== Career ==
=== Toronto Blue Jays ===
Lugo signed with the Toronto Blue Jays as a 16-year-old international free agent in 2011 for $1.3 million, the largest signing bonus paid to a Latin American infielder that year. Ben Badler of Baseball America described Lugo in a scouting report as having "a solid swing, good bat speed and makes consistent contact with natural loft, showing the potential for plus power down the road." He played his first season as a member of the Gulf Coast League Blue Jays in 2012, where he batted .224 in 47 games played. Lugo began the 2013 season playing with the Bluefield Blue Jays, where he posted a .297 batting average with 6 home runs and 36 RBIs in 51 games. He was then promoted to the Vancouver Canadians, and played 16 games in which he batted .246 with one home run and 8 RBIs. Lugo was promoted to the Lansing Lugnuts for the 2014 season. He played in a career-high 117 games, where he batted .259 with 4 home runs and 53 RBI. He began 2015 with the Dunedin Blue Jays and was promoted to Lansing in July.

=== Arizona Diamondbacks ===
On August 8, 2015, Lugo was traded to the Arizona Diamondbacks for Cliff Pennington. Arizona assigned him to the Kane County Cougars. In 120 total games between Dunedin, Lansing and Kane County, he batted .270 with four home runs and 47 RBIs. In 2016, he played for both the Visalia Rawhide and the Mobile BayBears, compiling a combined .311 batting average with 17 home runs and 62 RBIs in 127 total games between both clubs. The Diamondbacks added him to their 40-man roster after the 2016 season. Lugo began 2017 with the Jackson Generals.

=== Detroit Tigers ===
On July 18, 2017, the Diamondbacks traded Lugo, Sergio Alcántara, and Jose King to the Detroit Tigers for J. D. Martinez. The Tigers assigned him to the Erie SeaWolves, where he finished the season. In 131 games between Jackson and Erie, he slashed .277/.321/.424 with 13 home runs and 65 RBI.

On May 14, 2018, the Tigers called up Lugo after placing Jeimer Candelario on the 10-day disabled list. The Tigers sent Lugo back down to Toledo the next day before he could make his major league debut, and he briefly became a phantom ballplayer. He was called up again on August 30, and made his debut that evening against the New York Yankees. Lugo got his first major league hit in his third at-bat, a double off Chad Green. He hit his first major league home run on September 28 off Josh Hader of the Milwaukee Brewers.

Lugo was assigned to the Triple A Toledo Mud Hens to start the 2019 season. He was recalled on May 16, and hit a three-run homer that afternoon. With the Tigers in 2019, Lugo hit .245 with 6 home runs and 26 RBI in 273 at-bats.

In 2020, Lugo made only 11 plate appearances for the Tigers, hitting a meager .200/.273/.200. On August 17, 2020, Lugo was designated for assignment by Detroit; he cleared waivers and was sent outright to the alternate training site on August 22. He became a free agent on November 2.

=== Mariachis de Guadalajara ===
On February 15, 2021, Lugo signed with the Mariachis de Guadalajara of the Mexican League. Lugo played in 15 games for Guadalajara, batting .279/.343/.344 with one home run, 13 RBI, and one stolen base. He did not make an appearance for Guadalajara in 2022.

=== Charleston Dirty Birds ===
On March 21, 2023, Lugo signed with the Charleston Dirty Birds of the Atlantic League of Professional Baseball. In only 7 games for Charleston, Lugo went 4–for–17 (.235) with one RBI.

=== Olmecas de Tabasco ===
On January 26, 2024, Lugo signed with the Olmecas de Tabasco of the Mexican League. In 88 appearances for Tabasco, he slashed .271/.288/.389 with seven home runs and 32 RBI.

Lugo made 12 appearances for Tabasco in 2025, hitting .205/.225/.333 with one home run and two RBI.

=== Caliente de Durango ===
On May 19, 2025, Lugo was traded to the Caliente de Durango in exchange for Leobaldo Cabrera. In 14 appearances for Durango, he slashed .267/.279/.417 with two home runs and 13 RBI. Lugo was released by the Caliente on June 29.
