= Bonifacio Herrera =

Mexican politician

- Born: 14 March 1961 (age 65); Tepehuanes Municipality, Durango, Mexico
- Occupation: Politician
- Political party: PAN

Bonifacio Herrera Rivera (born 14 March 1961) is a Mexican politician from the National Action Party. From 2009 to 2012 he served as Deputy of the LXI Legislature of the Mexican Congress representing Durango.
