= 2019 Detroit Tigers season =

Major League Baseball season

2019 Detroit Tigers
- League: American League
- Division: Central
- Ballpark: Comerica Park
- City: Detroit, Michigan
- Record: 47–114 (.292)
- Divisional place: 5th
- Owners: Christopher Ilitch; Ilitch family trust
- General managers: Al Avila
- Managers: Ron Gardenhire
- Television: Fox Sports Detroit (Matt Shepard, Kirk Gibson, Jack Morris)
- Radio: Detroit Tigers Radio Network (Dan Dickerson, Jim Price)
- Stats: ESPN.com; Baseball Reference

The 2019 Detroit Tigers season was the team's 119th season. This was the team's second year under manager Ron Gardenhire. They finished the season 47–114, their worst since 2003, when they went 43–119. It was their first 100-loss season for the team since said season. It was also the second straight season where any team finished with fewer than 50 wins, after the previous year's Baltimore Orioles, who finished with only 47 wins. The Tigers only played 161 games in 2019 due to a late-season rainout in Chicago which was not made up due to the White Sox also missing the playoffs.

After the Tigers won seven of their first 10 games, the team lost 111 of the next 151 games. The stretch included eight different losing streaks of five or more games, including a season-long nine-game losing streak from May 13–23. They were officially eliminated from playoff contention on August 24.

On September 25, the Tigers secured the first overall pick in the 2020 Major League Baseball draft. With a loss in their final home game to the Minnesota Twins on September 26, the Tigers tied the 1939 St. Louis Browns for the most home losses (59) during a season in the modern era.

== Announcer changes ==
Beginning this season, Fox Sports Detroit television announcers Mario Impemba and Rod Allen, who had been together since 2003, were no longer in the broadcast booth. Their contracts were not renewed due to an alleged physical altercation that occurred after the game on September 4, 2018. On January 14, 2019, veteran sportscaster Matt Shepard was named play-by-play man, former Tigers teammates Kirk Gibson and Jack Morris were named color commentators, and Dan Petry was hired as a second studio analyst. Gibson was also named special assistant to the general manager on January 28. Shepard sat out 17 games, with Morris, Gibson, Petry and field reporter/studio analyst and former Tiger Craig Monroe sharing his duties instead.

== Roster moves ==
=== Releases ===
- On October 3, infielder Dixon Machado elected free agency. On December 3, he first signed a minor league contract with the Miami Marlins with an invitation to spring training. Machado ended up signing a minor league contract with the Chicago Cubs on March 30 after being released by the Marlins at the end of spring training.
- On October 24, outfielder Jim Adduci elected free agency after being dropped from the 40-man roster. On December 19, he signed a minor-league contract with the Chicago Cubs.
- On October 25, pitcher Artie Lewicki was claimed off waivers by the Arizona Diamondbacks.
- On October 29, catcher Jarrod Saltalamacchia elected free agency. On January 28, 2019, he announced his retirement.
- On November 5, shortstop José Iglesias elected free agency. On February 23, Iglesias signed a minor league contract with the Cincinnati Reds with an invitation to spring training.
- On November 14, pitcher Warwick Saupold signed a one-year contract with the Hanwha Eagles of the KBO.
- On November 18, pitcher Jacob Turner signed a one-year contract with the Kia Tigers of the KBO.
- On November 30, the Tigers announced they would not tender contracts to catcher James McCann and relief pitcher Alex Wilson, making them free agents. On December 19, McCann signed a one-year $2.5 million contract with the Chicago White Sox. On February 9, Wilson first signed a minor league contract with the Cleveland Indians but opted out of that contract to sign a major league contract with the Milwaukee Brewers on March 22.
- On December 10, outfielder Mike Gerber was claimed off waivers by the San Francisco Giants.
- On February 4, pitcher Francisco Liriano signed a minor league contract with the Pittsburgh Pirates.
- On August 9, the Tigers released infielder Josh Harrison and pitcher Sandy Báez. The Tigers re-signed Báez to a minor league contract on August 13. Harrison signed a minor league contract with the Philadelphia Phillies on November 26.
- On August 11, pitcher Trevor Rosenthal elected free agency after clearing waivers. He signed a minor league contract with the New York Yankees on August 21.

=== Signings ===
- On September 6, the Tigers claimed outfielder Dustin Peterson off waivers from the Atlanta Braves.
- On November 2, the Tigers claimed relief pitcher José Fernández off waivers from the Toronto Blue Jays and utility player Brandon Dixon from the Cincinnati Reds.
- On December 4, the Tigers signed pitcher Matt Moore to a one-year, $2.5 million contract.
- On December 4, the Tigers signed catcher Bobby Wilson to a minor league deal. He was released on March 22 and re-signed on March 24. His contract was selected on June 14.
- On December 10, the Tigers signed pitcher Tyson Ross to a one-year, $5.75 million contract.
- On December 13, the Tigers selected pitcher Reed Garrett in the Rule 5 draft. He was returned to the Texas Rangers on May 19.
- On December 14, the Tigers signed shortstop Jordy Mercer to a one-year, $5.25 million contract.
- On January 10, the Tigers agreed to a one-year, $4 million contract with relief pitcher Shane Greene, avoiding arbitration.
- On January 11, the Tigers avoided arbitration when they reached one-year deals with right fielder Nicholas Castellanos, and pitchers Matthew Boyd, Blaine Hardy and Daniel Norris.
- On January 22, Gordon Beckham signed a minor league contract. On March 23, 2019, the Tigers added him to their 25-man roster.
- On February 15, the Tigers signed pitcher Michael Fulmer to a one-year, $2.8 million contract following a salary arbitration hearing.
- On February 23, the Tigers signed infielder Josh Harrison to a one-year, $2 million contract.
- On May 26, the Tigers claimed pitcher Austin Adams off waivers from the Minnesota Twins.
- On June 5, the Tigers signed their first-round pick in the 2019 MLB draft, outfielder Riley Greene, to a $6.18 million contract.
- On June 29, the Tigers signed pitcher Trevor Rosenthal to a minor league contract.
- On August 6, the Tigers claimed pitcher David McKay off waivers from the Seattle Mariners.

=== Trades ===
- On July 31, the Tigers traded outfielder Nick Castellanos to the Chicago Cubs in exchange for pitchers Alex Lange and Paul Richan.
- Also on July 31, the Tigers traded relief pitcher Shane Greene to the Atlanta Braves in exchange for pitcher Joey Wentz and outfielder Travis Demeritte.

== Season standings ==
=== American League Central ===
AL Central
| Team | W | L | Pct. | GB | Home | Road |
|---|---|---|---|---|---|---|
| Minnesota Twins | 101 | 61 | .623 | — | 46‍–‍35 | 55‍–‍26 |
| Cleveland Indians | 93 | 69 | .574 | 8 | 49‍–‍32 | 44‍–‍37 |
| Chicago White Sox | 72 | 89 | .447 | 28½ | 39‍–‍41 | 33‍–‍48 |
| Kansas City Royals | 59 | 103 | .364 | 42 | 31‍–‍50 | 28‍–‍53 |
| Detroit Tigers | 47 | 114 | .292 | 53½ | 22‍–‍59 | 25‍–‍55 |

=== American League Wild Card ===
Division leaders
| Team | W | L | Pct. |
|---|---|---|---|
| Houston Astros | 107 | 55 | .660 |
| New York Yankees | 103 | 59 | .636 |
| Minnesota Twins | 101 | 61 | .623 |

Wild Card teams (Top 2 teams qualify for postseason)
| Team | W | L | Pct. | GB |
|---|---|---|---|---|
| Oakland Athletics | 97 | 65 | .599 | +1 |
| Tampa Bay Rays | 96 | 66 | .593 | — |
| Cleveland Indians | 93 | 69 | .574 | 3 |
| Boston Red Sox | 84 | 78 | .519 | 12 |
| Texas Rangers | 78 | 84 | .481 | 18 |
| Chicago White Sox | 72 | 89 | .447 | 23½ |
| Los Angeles Angels | 72 | 90 | .444 | 24 |
| Seattle Mariners | 68 | 94 | .420 | 28 |
| Toronto Blue Jays | 67 | 95 | .414 | 29 |
| Kansas City Royals | 59 | 103 | .364 | 37 |
| Baltimore Orioles | 54 | 108 | .333 | 42 |
| Detroit Tigers | 47 | 114 | .292 | 48½ |

=== Record against opponents ===
2019 American League record Source: MLB Standings Grid – 2019
| Team | BAL | BOS | CWS | CLE | DET | HOU | KC | LAA | MIN | NYY | OAK | SEA | TB | TEX | TOR | NL |
|---|---|---|---|---|---|---|---|---|---|---|---|---|---|---|---|---|
| Baltimore | — | 7–12 | 3–3 | 3–4 | 3–4 | 2–4 | 3–3 | 4–3 | 0–6 | 2–17 | 1–6 | 3–4 | 7–12 | 1–6 | 8–11 | 7–13 |
| Boston | 12–7 | — | 5–2 | 3–3 | 5–2 | 2–4 | 5–1 | 4–3 | 3–3 | 5–14 | 4–3 | 4–3 | 7–12 | 4–3 | 11–8 | 10–10 |
| Chicago | 3–3 | 2–5 | — | 11–8 | 12–6 | 4–3 | 9–10 | 2–5 | 6–13 | 4–3 | 1–5 | 2–4 | 2–4 | 4–3 | 4–3 | 6–14 |
| Cleveland | 4–3 | 3–3 | 8–11 | — | 18–1 | 3–4 | 12–7 | 6–0 | 10–9 | 4–3 | 1–5 | 5–1 | 1–6 | 4–3 | 6–1 | 8–12 |
| Detroit | 4–3 | 2–5 | 6–12 | 1–18 | — | 1–6 | 10–9 | 3–3 | 5–14 | 3–3 | 1–6 | 1–6 | 2–4 | 0–6 | 3–4 | 5–15 |
| Houston | 4–2 | 4–2 | 3–4 | 4–3 | 6–1 | — | 5–1 | 14–5 | 3–4 | 4–3 | 11–8 | 18–1 | 3–4 | 13–6 | 4–2 | 11–9 |
| Kansas City | 3–3 | 1–5 | 10–9 | 7–12 | 9–10 | 1–5 | — | 2–4 | 5–14 | 2–5 | 2–5 | 2–5 | 3–4 | 2–5 | 1–6 | 9–11 |
| Los Angeles | 3–4 | 3–4 | 5–2 | 0–6 | 3–3 | 5–14 | 4–2 | — | 1–5 | 2–5 | 6–13 | 10–9 | 3–4 | 9–10 | 6–1 | 12–8 |
| Minnesota | 6–0 | 3–3 | 13–6 | 9–10 | 14–5 | 4–3 | 14–5 | 5–1 | — | 2–4 | 3–4 | 5–2 | 5–2 | 6–1 | 4–3 | 8–12 |
| New York | 17–2 | 14–5 | 3–4 | 3–4 | 3–3 | 3–4 | 5–2 | 5–2 | 4–2 | — | 2–4 | 6–1 | 12–7 | 3–3 | 11–8 | 12–8 |
| Oakland | 6–1 | 3–4 | 5–1 | 5–1 | 6–1 | 8–11 | 5–2 | 13–6 | 4–3 | 4–2 | — | 10–9 | 4–3 | 13–6 | 0–6 | 11–9 |
| Seattle | 4–3 | 3–4 | 4–2 | 1–5 | 6–1 | 1–18 | 5–2 | 9–10 | 2–5 | 1–6 | 9–10 | — | 2–4 | 8–11 | 4–2 | 9–11 |
| Tampa Bay | 12–7 | 12–7 | 4–2 | 6–1 | 4–2 | 4–3 | 4–3 | 4–3 | 2–5 | 7–12 | 3–4 | 4–2 | — | 3–3 | 13–6 | 14–6 |
| Texas | 6–1 | 3–4 | 3–4 | 3–4 | 6–0 | 6–13 | 5–2 | 10–9 | 1–6 | 3–3 | 6–13 | 11–8 | 3–3 | — | 3–3 | 9–11 |
| Toronto | 11–8 | 8–11 | 3–4 | 1–6 | 4–3 | 2–4 | 6–1 | 1–6 | 3–4 | 8–11 | 6–0 | 2–4 | 6–13 | 3–3 | — | 3–17 |

== Season highlights ==
=== Team accomplishments ===
- On April 3, the Tigers became the third team since 1900 to win at least four of its first seven games when scoring a combined 12-or-fewer runs, joining the 1913 Philadelphia Phillies and the 1971 New York Mets.
- On April 4 against the Kansas City Royals, the Tigers won the game while recording more walks (7) than hits (6). The Tigers scored twice in the seventh inning without recording one hit, as they drew four consecutive walks, followed by a sacrifice fly.
- On August 21 against the Houston Astros, the Tigers closed as +435 underdogs at Caesars Sportsbook, making their 2–1 victory over the Astros the largest upset in MLB in the past 15 seasons. In a statistical oddity, opposing pitcher Justin Verlander never threw a pitch with a runner on base, as the Tigers' only two hits were solo home runs.

=== Individual accomplishments ===
==== Pitching ====
- On March 28 against the Toronto Blue Jays, Jordan Zimmermann took a perfect game into the seventh inning, before allowing a two-out infield single to Teoscar Hernández.
- On March 31 against the Toronto Blue Jays, Matt Moore took a no-hitter into the sixth inning, before a one-out single by Richard Ureña ruined the no-hit bid.
- On April 3 against the New York Yankees, Matthew Boyd recorded a career-high 13 strikeouts. Boyd posted 10 strikeouts in his first start, becoming the first Tigers pitcher since 1908 to start the season with consecutive double-digit strikeout games. Boyd also set a record for the most strikeouts by a visiting pitcher at the current Yankee Stadium. His 13 strikeouts were the most by a Tigers pitcher since Max Scherzer recorded 14 in August 2014.
- On April 4 against the Kansas City Royals, Spencer Turnbull recorded a career-high 10 strikeouts. With Boyd's 13 strikeouts the day before, this marked the first time that Tigers pitchers had double-digit strikeouts in consecutive games since Rick Porcello and Aníbal Sánchez in 2014.
- On April 7 against the Kansas City Royals, Shane Greene became the first pitcher in Major League history to earn seven saves in his team's first 10 games since saves became an official MLB statistic in 1969.
- On April 10 against the Cleveland Indians, Shane Greene extended his saves record, becoming the first pitcher in Major League history to earn eight saves in his team's first 12 games since 1969.
- On July 4 against the Chicago White Sox, Matthew Boyd became the first pitcher in the live-ball era to record 13 strikeouts and zero walks in six innings or fewer in a game.

==== Hitting ====
- On April 6 against the Kansas City Royals, Christin Stewart became the first Tigers rookie player to hit a grand slam since Brennan Boesch in 2010.
- On May 8, Ronny Rodríguez fell a home run shy of the cycle, hitting a single, double, and triple, to help the Tigers defeat the Los Angeles Angels, 10–3.
- On May 31, Niko Goodrum fell a triple shy of the cycle, going 5-for-5, with two singles, a double and two home runs, to help the Tigers defeat the Atlanta Braves, 8–2. He became the first Tigers player to go 5-for-5 with two home runs and three extra-base hits in a game since Dmitri Young in 2003. He also was the first player to have five hits while playing for the first time in his home state since Ohio-born Pete Susko did so for the Washington Senators at Cleveland in 1934.

== Game log ==
2019 Game Log: 47–114 (Home: 22–59; Away: 25–55)
March/April: 13–14 (Home: 6–5; Away: 7–9)

| # | Date | Opponent | Score | Win | Loss | Save | Attendance | Record | Streak |
|---|---|---|---|---|---|---|---|---|---|
| 1 | March 28 | @ Blue Jays | 2–0 (10) | **Alcántara** (1–0) | Hudson (0–1) | **Greene** (1) | 45,048 | 1–0 | W1 |
| 2 | March 29 | @ Blue Jays | 0–6 | Shoemaker (1–0) | **Boyd** (0–1) | — | 18,054 | 1–1 | L1 |
| 3 | March 30 | @ Blue Jays | 0–3 | Sanchez (1–0) | **Turnbull** (0–1) | Giles (1) | 25,429 | 1–2 | L2 |
| 4 | March 31 | @ Blue Jays | 4–3 (11) | **Stumpf** (1–0) | Pannone (0–1) | **Greene** (2) | 16,098 | 2–2 | W1 |
| 5 | April 1 | @ Yankees | 1–3 | Germán (1–0) | **Ross** (0–1) | Chapman (1) | 32,036 | 2–3 | L1 |
| 6 | April 2 | @ Yankees | 3–1 | **Jiménez** (1–0) | Chapman (0–1) | **Greene** (3) | 32,018 | 3–3 | W1 |
| 7 | April 3 | @ Yankees | 2–1 | **Farmer** (1–0) | Green (0–1) | **Greene** (4) | 33,038 | 4–3 | W2 |
| 8 | April 4 | Royals | 5–4 | **Hardy** (1–0) | Zimmer (0–1) | **Greene** (5) | 42,641 | 5–3 | W3 |
| 9 | April 6 | Royals | 7–4 | **Alcántara** (2–0) | McCarthy (0–1) | **Greene** (6) | 22,111 | 6–3 | W4 |
| 10 | April 7 | Royals | 3–1 | **Ross** (1–1) | Keller (1–1) | **Greene** (7) | 15,058 | 7–3 | W5 |
| 11 | April 9 | Indians | 2–8 | Kluber (1–2) | **Zimmermann** (0–1) | — | 12,114 | 7–4 | L1 |
| 12 | April 10 | Indians | 4–1 | **Boyd** (1–1) | Bauer (1–1) | **Greene** (8) | 11,128 | 8–4 | W1 |
| 13 | April 11 | Indians | 0–4 | Bieber (1–0) | **Turnbull** (0–2) | — | 13,910 | 8–5 | L1 |
| — | April 12 | @ Twins | Postponed (inclement weather). Rescheduled to May 11. | | | | | | |
| 14 | April 13 | @ Twins | 3–4 | Pineda (2–0) | **Ross** (1–2) | Parker (3) | 16,484 | 8–6 | L2 |
| 15 | April 14 | @ Twins | 4–6 | Berríos (2–1) | **Zimmermann** (0–2) | Hildenberger (1) | 14,774 | 8–7 | L3 |
| 16 | April 16 | Pirates | 3–5 (10) | Kela (1–0) | **Greene** (0–1) | Kingham (1) | 13,251 | 8–8 | L4 |
| 17 | April 17 | Pirates | 2–3 (10) | Burdi (2–1) | **Farmer** (1–1) | Vázquez (5) | 12,994 | 8–9 | L5 |
| 18 | April 18 | White Sox | 9–7 | **VerHagen** (1–0) | Fulmer (0–1) | **Greene** (9) | 14,320 | 9–9 | W1 |
| 19 | April 19 | White Sox | 3–7 | Rodón (3–2) | **Zimmermann** (0–3) | — | 14,568 | 9–10 | L1 |
| — | April 20 | White Sox | Postponed (inclement weather). Rescheduled to August 6. | | | | | | |
| 20 | April 21 | White Sox | 4–3 | **Norris** (1–0) | López (1–3) | **Greene** (10) | 15,686 | 10–10 | W1 |
| — | April 22 | @ Red Sox | Postponed (inclement weather). Rescheduled to April 23. | | | | | | |
| 21 | April 23 | @ Red Sox | 7–4 | **Boyd** (2–1) | Brewer (0–2) | — | 30,015 | 11–10 | W2 |
| 22 | April 23 | @ Red Sox | 4–2 | **Turnbull** (1–2) | Velázquez (0–2) | **Greene** (11) | 30,578 | 12–10 | W3 |
| 23 | April 24 | @ Red Sox | 4–11 | Rodríguez (2–2) | **Ross** (1–3) | — | 31,763 | 12–11 | L1 |
| 24 | April 25 | @ Red Sox | 3–7 | Porcello (1–3) | **Zimmermann** (0–4) | — | 34,165 | 12–12 | L2 |
| 25 | April 26 | @ White Sox | 11–12 | Colomé (1–0) | **Jiménez** (1–1) | — | 18,016 | 12–13 | L3 |
| — | April 27 | @ White Sox | Postponed (inclement weather). Rescheduled to July 3. | | | | | | |
| 26 | April 28 | @ White Sox | 1–4 | López (2–3) | **Boyd** (2–2) | Colomé (5) | 14,539 | 12–14 | L4 |
| 27 | April 30 | @ Phillies | 3–1 | **Turnbull** (2–2) | Velasquez (1–1) | **Greene** (12) | 31,759 | 13–14 | W1 |

May: 9–18 (Home: 3–12; Away: 6–6)

| # | Date | Opponent | Score | Win | Loss | Save | Attendance | Record | Streak |
|---|---|---|---|---|---|---|---|---|---|
| 28 | May 1 | @ Phillies | 3–7 | Domínguez (2–0) | **Farmer** (1–2) | — | 28,103 | 13–15 | L1 |
| 29 | May 3 | Royals | 4–3 | **Boyd** (3–2) | López (0–3) | **Greene** (13) | 14,020 | 14–15 | W1 |
| 30 | May 4 | Royals | 3–15 | Bailey (3–3) | **Ross** (1–4) | — | 19,500 | 14–16 | L1 |
| 31 | May 5 | Royals | 5–2 (10) | **Farmer** (2–2) | Kennedy (0–1) | — | 16,369 | 15–16 | W1 |
| 32 | May 7 | Angels | 2–5 | Canning (1–0) | **Norris** (1–1) | Robles (3) | 14,169 | 15–17 | L1 |
| 33 | May 8 | Angels | 10–3 | **Boyd** (4–2) | Skaggs (3–3) | — | 13,224 | 16–17 | W1 |
| 34 | May 9 | Angels | 0–13 | Peña (2–1) | **Carpenter** (0–1) | — | 16,404 | 16–18 | L1 |
| 35 | May 10 | @ Twins | 0–6 | Odorizzi (5–2) | **Ross** (1–5) | — | 26,789 | 16–19 | L2 |
| 36 | May 11 | @ Twins | 5–3 | **Jiménez** (2–1) | Hildenberger (2–2) | **Greene** (14) | 28,840 | 17–19 | W1 |
| 37 | May 11 | @ Twins | 3–8 | Stewart (1–1) | **Soto** (0–1) | — | 20,724 | 17–20 | L1 |
| 38 | May 12 | @ Twins | 5–3 | **Norris** (2–1) | Pérez (5–1) | **Greene** (15) | 27,373 | 18–20 | W1 |
| 39 | May 13 | Astros | 1–8 | Peacock (4–2) | **Boyd** (4–3) | — | 15,086 | 18–21 | L1 |
| 40 | May 14 | Astros | 4–11 | Miley (4–2) | **Carpenter** (0–2) | — | 14,261 | 18–22 | L2 |
| 41 | May 15 | Astros | 1–5 | Verlander (7–1) | **Soto** (0–2) | — | 15,940 | 18–23 | L3 |
| 42 | May 16 | Athletics | 3–17 | Bassitt (2–1) | **Turnbull** (2–3) | — | 18,527 | 18–24 | L4 |
| 43 | May 17 | Athletics | 2–7 | Montas (5–2) | **Norris** (2–2) | — | 18,746 | 18–25 | L5 |
| 44 | May 18 | Athletics | 1–4 | Mengden (1–1) | **Boyd** (4–4) | Treinen (7) | 22,913 | 18–26 | L6 |
| — | May 19 | Athletics | Suspended (inclement weather). Continuation scheduled for September 6 in Oakland.^{[a]} | | | | | | |
| 45 | May 21 | Marlins | 4–5 (11) | Anderson (1–1) | **Jiménez** (2–2) | — | 15,565 | 18–27 | L7 |
| 46 | May 22 | Marlins | 3–6 | Ureña (2–6) | **Farmer** (2–3) | Romo (8) | 14,506 | 18–28 | L8 |
| 47 | May 23 | Marlins | 2–5 | Kinley (1–0) | **Greene** (0–2) | Romo (9) | 17,214 | 18–29 | L9 |
| 48 | May 24 | @ Mets | 9–8 | **Farmer** (3–3) | Gagnon (3–1) | **Greene** (16) | 27,082 | 19–29 | W1 |
| 49 | May 25 | @ Mets | 4–5 (13) | Santiago (1–0) | **Farmer** (3–4) | — | 40,691 | 19–30 | L1 |
| 50 | May 26 | @ Mets | 3–4 | Wheeler (4–3) | **Turnbull** (2–4) | Díaz (13) | 31,414 | 19–31 | L2 |
| 51 | May 27 | @ Orioles | 3–5 | Straily (2–4) | **Norris** (2–3) | Armstrong (1) | 18,004 | 19–32 | L3 |
| 52 | May 28 | @ Orioles | 3–0 | **Boyd** (5–4) | Bundy (2–6) | **Greene** (17) | 8,106 | 20–32 | W1 |
| 53 | May 29 | @ Orioles | 4–2 | **Ramirez** (1–0) | Kline (1–2) | **Greene** (18) | 10,614 | 21–32 | W2 |
| 54 | May 31 | @ Braves | 8–2 | **Turnbull** (3–4) | Foltynewicz (1–4) | — | 35,524 | 22–32 | W3 |

June: 5–20 (Home: 3–12; Away: 2–8)

| # | Date | Opponent | Score | Win | Loss | Save | Attendance | Record | Streak |
|---|---|---|---|---|---|---|---|---|---|
| 55 | June 1 | @ Braves | 5–10 | Soroka (6–1) | **Norris** (2–4) | Jackson (8) | 37,108 | 22–33 | L1 |
| 56 | June 2 | @ Braves | 4–7 | Toussaint (3–0) | **Jiménez** (2–3) | — | 28,978 | 22–34 | L2 |
| 57 | June 4 | Rays | 9–6 | **Carpenter** (1–2) | Snell (3–5) | **Greene** (19) | 15,420 | 23–34 | W1 |
| 58 | June 5 | Rays | 0–4 | Morton (7–0) | **Turnbull** (3–5) | — | 14,272 | 23–35 | L1 |
| 59 | June 6 | Rays | 1–6 | Beeks (5–0) | **Norris** (2–5) | — | 21,442 | 23–36 | L2 |
| 60 | June 7 | Twins | 3–6 | Harper (1–0) | **Jiménez** (2–4) | Parker (9) | 21,551 | 23–37 | L3 |
| 61 | June 8 | Twins | 9–3 | **Ramirez** (2–0) | Gibson (6–3) | — | 26,818 | 24–37 | W1 |
| 62 | June 9 | Twins | 2–12 | Odorizzi (9–2) | **Carpenter** (1–3) | — | 20,127 | 24–38 | L1 |
| 63 | June 11 | @ Royals | 2–3 | Barlow (2–2) | **Alcántara** (2–1) | Kennedy (5) | 20,776 | 24–39 | L2 |
| 64 | June 12 | @ Royals | 3–2 | **Ramirez** (3–0) | Diekman (0–3) | **Greene** (20) | 19,870 | 25–39 | W1 |
| 65 | June 13 | @ Royals^{[b]} | 3–7 | Bailey (5–6) | **Boyd** (5–5) | Kennedy (6) | 25,454 | 25–40 | L1 |
| 66 | June 14 | Indians | 4–13 | Plutko (3–1) | **Carpenter** (1–4) | — | 22,362 | 25–41 | L2 |
| 67 | June 15 | Indians | 2–4 | Bieber (6–2) | **Ramirez** (3–1) | Hand (20) | 25,523 | 25–42 | L3 |
| 68 | June 16 | Indians | 0–8 | Bauer (5–6) | **Turnbull** (3–6) | — | 26,705 | 25–43 | L4 |
| 69 | June 18 | @ Pirates | 5–4 | **Farmer** (4–4) | Crick (2–3) | **Greene** (21) | 18,301 | 26–43 | W1 |
| 70 | June 19 | @ Pirates | 7–8 | Rodríguez (2–3) | **Ramirez** (3–2) | Vázquez (17) | 18,088 | 26–44 | L1 |
| 71 | June 21 | @ Indians | 6–7 | Cimber (3–2) | **Jiménez** (2–5) | Hand (21) | 30,717 | 26–45 | L2 |
| 72 | June 22 | @ Indians | 0–2 | Civale (1–0) | **Turnbull** (3–7) | Hand (22) | 30,103 | 26–46 | L3 |
| 73 | June 23 | @ Indians | 3–8 | Plesac (3–2) | **Norris** (2–6) | — | 25,790 | 26–47 | L4 |
| 74 | June 25 | Rangers | 3–5 | Chavez (3–2) | **Zimmermann** (0–5) | — | 18,952 | 26–48 | L5 |
| 75 | June 26 | Rangers | 1–4 | Minor (8–4) | **Boyd** (5–6) | — | 19,732 | 26–49 | L6 |
| 76 | June 27 | Rangers | 1–3 | Jurado (5–3) | **Turnbull** (3–8) | Kelley (11) | 22,925 | 26–50 | L7 |
| 77 | June 28 | Nationals | 1–3 | Sánchez (4–6) | **Norris** (2–7) | Rodney (1) | 20,877 | 26–51 | L8 |
| 78 | June 29 | Nationals | 7–5 | **Alcántara** (3–1) | Rainey (1–3) | **Greene** (22) | 27,716 | 27–51 | W1 |
| 79 | June 30 | Nationals | 1–2 | Scherzer (8–5) | **Jiménez** (2–6) | Doolittle (18) | 21,052 | 27–52 | L1 |

July: 5–20 (Home: 1–7; Away: 4–13)

| # | Date | Opponent | Score | Win | Loss | Save | Attendance | Record | Streak |
|---|---|---|---|---|---|---|---|---|---|
| — | July 2 | @ White Sox | Postponed (inclement weather). Rescheduled to September 27. | | | | | | |
| 80 | July 3 | @ White Sox | 5–7 | Cease (1–0) | **Norris** (2–8) | Colomé (19) | 26,023 | 27–53 | L2 |
| 81 | July 3 | @ White Sox | 6–9 (12) | Ruiz (1–1) | **Ramirez** (3–3) | — | 23,161 | 27–54 | L3 |
| 82 | July 4 | @ White Sox | 11–5 | **Boyd** (6–6) | López (4–8) | — | 25,617 | 28–54 | W1 |
| 83 | July 5 | Red Sox | 6–9 | Rodríguez (9–4) | **Carpenter** (1–5) | — | 27,181 | 28–55 | L1 |
| 84 | July 6 | Red Sox | 6–10 | Porcello (6–7) | **Zimmermann** (0–6) | — | 28,114 | 28–56 | L2 |
| 85 | July 7 | Red Sox | 3–6 | Price (7–2) | **Soto** (0–3) | Hembree (2) | 23,187 | 28–57 | L3 |
**2019 Major League Baseball All-Star Game**
| 86 | July 12 | @ Royals | 5–8 | Newberry (1–0) | **Hardy** (1–1) | Kennedy (12) | 25,059 | 28–58 | L4 |
| 87 | July 13 | @ Royals | 1–4 | Keller (5–9) | **Boyd** (6–7) | Kennedy (13) | 27,551 | 28–59 | L5 |
| 88 | July 14 | @ Royals | 12–8 | **Ramirez** (4–3) | Flynn (2–1) | — | 13,763 | 29–59 | W1 |
| 89 | July 15 | @ Indians | 6–8 | Wittgren (4–0) | **Alcántara** (3–2) | Hand (25) | 15,735 | 29–60 | L1 |
| 90 | July 16 | @ Indians | 0–8 | Goody (1–0) | **Carpenter** (1–6) | — | 16,769 | 29–61 | L2 |
| 91 | July 17 | @ Indians | 2–7 | Clevinger (3–2) | **Turnbull** (3–9) | Wittgren (2) | 18,894 | 29–62 | L3 |
| 92 | July 18 | @ Indians | 3–6 | Bauer (9–7) | **Boyd** (6–8) | Hand (26) | 17,500 | 29–63 | L4 |
| 93 | July 19 | Blue Jays | 1–12 | Stroman (6–10) | **Zimmermann** (0–7) | — | 26,498 | 29–64 | L5 |
| 94 | July 20 | Blue Jays | 5–7 | Font (3–2) | **Soto** (0–4) | Giles (14) | 28,784 | 29–65 | L6 |
| 95 | July 21 | Blue Jays | 4–3 (10) | **Ramirez** (5–3) | Mayza (0–1) | — | 22,562 | 30–65 | W1 |
| 96 | July 23 | Phillies | 2–3 (15) | Álvarez (1–2) | **Stumpf** (1–1) | — | 23,607 | 30–66 | L1 |
| 97 | July 24 | Phillies | 0–4 | Velasquez (3–5) | **Zimmermann** (0–8) | — | 33,735 | 30–67 | L2 |
| 98 | July 25 | @ Mariners | 2–10 | LeBlanc (6–3) | **VerHagen** (1–1) | — | 18,544 | 30–68 | L3 |
| 99 | July 26 | @ Mariners | 2–3 | Elías (3–2) | **Cisnero** (0–1) | — | 26,702 | 30–69 | L4 |
| 100 | July 27 | @ Mariners | 1–8 | Gonzales (12–8) | **Alexander** (0–1) | — | 27,140 | 30–70 | L5 |
| 101 | July 28 | @ Mariners | 2–3 (10) | Elías (4–2) | **Cisnero** (0–2) | — | 20,024 | 30–71 | L6 |
| 102 | July 29 | @ Angels | 7–2 | **Zimmermann** (1–8) | Barría (4–4) | — | 35,457 | 31–71 | W1 |
| 103 | July 30 | @ Angels | 1–6 | Canning (4–6) | **VerHagen** (1–2) | — | 33,907 | 31–72 | L1 |
| 104 | July 31 | @ Angels | 9–1 | **Norris** (3–8) | Suárez (2–2) | — | 37,511 | 32–72 | W1 |

August: 8–21 (Home: 5–11; Away: 3–10)

| # | Date | Opponent | Score | Win | Loss | Save | Attendance | Record | Streak |
|---|---|---|---|---|---|---|---|---|---|
| 105 | August 2 | @ Rangers | 4–5 | Lynn (14–6) | **Alexander** (0–2) | Leclerc (6) | 26,884 | 32–73 | L1 |
| 106 | August 3 | @ Rangers | 4–5 (10) | Leclerc (2–3) | **Ramirez** (5–4) | — | 30,292 | 32–74 | L2 |
| 107 | August 4 | @ Rangers | 4–9 | Montero (1–0) | **Cisnero** (0–3) | — | 18,531 | 32–75 | L3 |
| 108 | August 5 | White Sox | 4–7 | Giolito (12–5) | **Soto** (0–5) | — | 16,942 | 32–76 | L4 |
| 109 | August 6 | White Sox | 3–5 | Cease (2–4) | **Norris** (3–9) | Colomé (22) | 18,455 | 32–77 | L5 |
| 110 | August 6 | White Sox | 10–6 | **VerHagen** (2–2) | Santiago (1–1) | — | 16,367 | 33–77 | W1 |
| 111 | August 7 | White Sox | 1–8 | Nova (7–9) | **Alexander** (0–3) | — | 17,444 | 33–78 | L1 |
| 112 | August 8 | Royals | 10–8 | **Jiménez** (3–6) | Lovelady (0–2) | — | 17,197 | 34–78 | W1 |
| 113 | August 9 | Royals | 5–2 | **Jackson** (2–5) | Keller (7–12) | **Jiménez** (1) | 21,475 | 35–78 | W2 |
| 114 | August 10 | Royals | 0–7 | Montgomery (2–5) | **Turnbull** (3–10) | — | 26,028 | 35–79 | L1 |
| 115 | August 11 | Royals | 2–10 | Junis (8–10) | **Norris** (3–10) | — | 19,790 | 35–80 | L2 |
| 116 | August 13 | Mariners | 6–11 | Grotz (1–0) | **Boyd** (6–9) | — | 16,195 | 35–81 | L3 |
| 117 | August 14 | Mariners | 3–2 | **Jackson** (3–5) | Gonzales (12–10) | **Jiménez** (2) | 17,132 | 36–81 | W1 |
| 118 | August 15 | Mariners | 2–7 | Milone (2–7) | **Turnbull** (3–11) | — | 19,440 | 36–82 | L1 |
| 119 | August 16 | @ Rays | 2–0 | **VerHagen** (3–2) | Morton (13–5) | **Jiménez** (3) | 13,717 | 37–82 | W1 |
| 120 | August 17 | @ Rays | 0–1 (13) | Poche (3–4) | **Hall** (0–1) | — | 17,228 | 37–83 | L1 |
| 121 | August 18 | @ Rays | 4–5 | Alvarado (1–5) | **Jiménez** (3–7) | — | 16,634 | 37–84 | L2 |
| 122 | August 19 | @ Astros | 4–5 | Miley (12–4) | **Jackson** (3–6) | Osuna (28) | 40,499 | 37–85 | L3 |
| 123 | August 20 | @ Astros | 3–6 | Peacock (7–6) | **Turnbull** (3–12) | Osuna (29) | 30,143 | 37–86 | L4 |
| 124 | August 21 | @ Astros | 2–1 | **Farmer** (5–4) | Verlander (15–5) | **Jiménez** (4) | 29,567 | 38–86 | W1 |
| 125 | August 22 | @ Astros | 3–6 | Cole (15–5) | **Zimmermann** (1–9) | Osuna (30) | 27,220 | 38–87 | L1 |
| 126 | August 23 | @ Twins | 9–6 | **VerHagen** (4–2) | Berríos (10–7) | — | 31,238 | 39–87 | W1 |
| 127 | August 24 | @ Twins | 5–8 | Gibson (12–6) | **Jackson** (3–7) | Rogers (20) | 39,429 | 39–88 | L1 |
| 128 | August 25 | @ Twins | 4–7 | Pérez (9–5) | **Boyd** (6–10) | — | 32,892 | 39–89 | L2 |
| 129 | August 27 | Indians | 1–10 | Plutko (6–3) | **Turnbull** (3–13) | — | 15,715 | 39–90 | L3 |
| 130 | August 28 | Indians | 2–4 | Civale (2–3) | **Farmer** (5–5) | Hand (32) | 15,834 | 39–91 | L4 |
| 131 | August 29 | Indians | 0–2 | Clevinger (10–2) | **Norris** (3–11) | Hand (33) | 16,855 | 39–92 | L5 |
| 132 | August 30 | Twins | 5–13 | Gibson (13–6) | **Jackson** (3–8) | — | 17,273 | 39–93 | L6 |
| 133 | August 31 | Twins | 10–7 | **Boyd** (7–10) | Pérez (9–6) | — | 16,713 | 40–93 | W1 |

September: 7–21 (Home: 4–12; Away: 3–9)

| # | Date | Opponent | Score | Win | Loss | Save | Attendance | Record | Streak |
|---|---|---|---|---|---|---|---|---|---|
| 134 | September 1 | Twins | 3–8 | Pineda (11–5) | **Turnbull** (3–14) | — | 13,776 | 40–94 | L1 |
| 135 | September 2 | Twins | 3–4 | Littell (3–0) | **Farmer** (5–6) | Rogers (22) | 14,614 | 40–95 | L2 |
| 136 | September 3 | @ Royals | 5–6 | Kennedy (2–2) | **Reininger** (0–1) | — | 12,644 | 40–96 | L3 |
| 137 | September 4 | @ Royals | 4–5 | Junis (9–12) | **Jackson** (3–9) | Kennedy (26) | 15,308 | 40–97 | L4 |
| 138 | September 5 | @ Royals | 6–4 | **Boyd** (8–10) | Sparkman (3–11) | **Jiménez** (5) | 14,736 | 41–97 | W1 |
| 139 | September 6 | @ Athletics ^{[a]} | 3–7 | Fiers (4–3) | **Reininger** (0–2) | — | 15,680 | 41–98 | L1 |
| 140 | September 6 | @ Athletics | 5–4 (11) | **Schreiber** (1–0) | Blackburn (0–2) | **Jiménez** (6) | 16,080 | 42–98 | W1 |
| 141 | September 7 | @ Athletics | 2–10 | Bassitt (10–5) | **Zimmermann** (1–10) | — | 32,626 | 42–99 | L1 |
| 142 | September 8 | @ Athletics | 1–3 | Manaea (1–0) | **Norris** (3–12) | Hendriks (19) | 24,550 | 42–100 | L2 |
| 143 | September 10 | Yankees | 12–11 | **Jiménez** (4–7) | Adams (1–1) | — | 16,733 | 43–100 | W1 |
| — | September 11 | Yankees | Postponed (inclement weather). Rescheduled to September 12. | | | | | | |
| 144 | September 12 | Yankees | 4–10 | Green (4–4) | **Boyd** (8–11) | — | — | 43–101 | L1 |
| 145 | September 12 | Yankees | 4–6 | Germán (18–4) | **Turnbull** (3–15) | Chapman (37) | 17,807 | 43–102 | L2 |
| 146 | September 13 | Orioles | 2–6 | Brooks (5–8) | **Zimmermann** (1–11) | — | 14,722 | 43–103 | L3 |
| 147 | September 14 | Orioles | 8–4 (12) | **Schreiber** (2–0) | Fry (1–9) | — | 17,760 | 44–103 | W1 |
| 148 | September 15 | Orioles | 2–8 | Wojciechowski (3–8) | **Jackson** (3–10) | — | 15,688 | 44–104 | L1 |
| 149 | September 16 | Orioles | 5–2 | **Alexander** (1–3) | Means (10–11) | **Jiménez** (7) | 14,142 | 45–104 | W1 |
| 150 | September 17 | @ Indians | 2–7 | Plutko (7–4) | **Reininger** (0–3) | — | 19,108 | 45–105 | L1 |
| 151 | September 18 | @ Indians | 1–2 (10) | Cimber (6–3) | **Cisnero** (0–4) | — | 15,828 | 45–106 | L2 |
| 152 | September 19 | @ Indians | 0–7 | Clevinger (12–3) | **Norris** (3–13) | — | 19,432 | 45–107 | L3 |
| 153 | September 20 | White Sox | 1–10 | Cease (4–7) | **Zimmermann** (1–12) | — | 15,265 | 45–108 | L4 |
| 154 | September 21 | White Sox | 3–5 | Nova (11–12) | **Alexander** (1–4) | Colomé (29) | 16,891 | 45–109 | L5 |
| 155 | September 22 | White Sox | 6–3 | **Boyd** (9–11) | López (9–15) | **Jiménez** (8) | 16,157 | 46–109 | W1 |
| 156 | September 24 | Twins | 2–4 | Odorizzi (15–7) | **Turnbull** (3–16) | Rogers (29) | 16,174 | 46–110 | L1 |
| 157 | September 25 | Twins | 1–5 | Dobnak (2–1) | **VerHagen** (4–3) | — | 16,242 | 46–111 | L2 |
| 158 | September 26 | Twins | 4–10 | Smeltzer (2–2) | **Zimmermann** (1–13) | — | 17,557 | 46–112 | L3 |
| — | September 27 | @ White Sox | Postponed (rain). Rescheduled to September 28. | | | | | | |
| — | September 27 | @ White Sox | Cancelled (rain). Due to both teams being eliminated from playoff contention. | | | | | | |
| 159 | September 28 | @ White Sox | 1–7 | López (10–15) | **Boyd** (9–12) | — | — | 46–113 | L4 |
| 160 | September 28 | @ White Sox | 4–3 | **Farmer** (6–6) | Colomé (4–5) | **Jiménez** (9) | 25,552 | 47–113 | W1 |
| 161 | September 29 | @ White Sox | 3–5 | Cordero (1–1) | **Turnbull** (3–17) | Herrera (1) | 19,534 | 47–114 | L1 |

Legend: = Win = Loss = Postponement
Bold = Tigers team member

Notes:

- **^{a}** The May 19 game in Detroit against Oakland was suspended due to rain in the bottom of seventh inning with the score 5–3 in favor of the Athletics. It was completed on September 6 prior to the regularly scheduled game that evening in Oakland. The Tigers were designated the "home" team for the makeup date.
- **^{b}** The game was played at TD Ameritrade Park in Omaha, Nebraska.

== Roster ==
2019 Detroit Tigers
Roster
| Pitchers: 50 Austin Adams; 58 Victor Alcántara; 70 Tyler Alexander; 62 Sandy Báez; 48 Matthew Boyd; 31 Ryan Carpenter; 67 José Cisnero; 45 Buck Farmer; 57 José Fernández; 33 Bryan Garcia; 50 Reed Garrett; 61 Shane Greene; 64 Matt Hall; 36 Blaine Hardy; 19 Edwin Jackson; 66 Eduardo Jiménez; 77 Joe Jiménez; 62 David McKay; 51 Matt Moore; 44 Daniel Norris; 63 Nick Ramirez; 26 Zac Reininger; 19 Trevor Rosenthal; 38 Tyson Ross; 71 John Schreiber; 65 Gregory Soto; 68 Daniel Stumpf; 19 Carlos Torres; 56 Spencer Turnbull; 54 Drew VerHagen; 27 Jordan Zimmermann | Catchers: 17 Grayson Greiner; 55 John Hicks; 34 Jake Rogers; 37 Bobby Wilson; Infielders: 29 Gordon Beckham; 24 Miguel Cabrera; 46 Jeimer Candelario; 30 Harold Castro; 49 Willi Castro; 12 Brandon Dixon; 28 Niko Goodrum; 1 Josh Harrison; 18 Dawel Lugo; 7 Jordy Mercer; 60 Ronny Rodríguez; Outfielders: 9 Nicholas Castellanos; 50 Travis Demeritte; 21 JaCoby Jones; 8 Mikie Mahtook; 13 Dustin Peterson; 22 Víctor Reyes; 14 Christin Stewart | Manager: 15 Ron Gardenhire; Coaches: 4 Rick Anderson (pitching); 98 Jeremy Carrell (bullpen catcher); 25 Dave Clark (third base); 59 Phil Clark (assistant hitting); 43 Steve Liddle (bench); 20 Lloyd McClendon (hitting); 53 Jeff Pico (bullpen); 99 Tim Remes (bullpen catcher); 39 Ramón Santiago (first base); 52 Joe Vavra (quality control) |

=== Player stats ===
==== Batting ====
Note: G = Games played; AB = At bats; R = Runs scored; H = Hits; 2B = Doubles; 3B = Triples; HR = Home runs; RBI = Runs batted in; AVG = Batting average; SB = Stolen bases

| Player | G | AB | R | H | 2B | 3B | HR | RBI | AVG | SB |
|---|---|---|---|---|---|---|---|---|---|---|
| Gordon Beckham | 83 | 223 | 29 | 48 | 13 | 2 | 6 | 15 | .215 | 3 |
| Miguel Cabrera | 136 | 493 | 41 | 139 | 21 | 0 | 12 | 59 | .282 | 0 |
| Jeimer Candelario | 94 | 335 | 33 | 68 | 17 | 2 | 8 | 32 | .203 | 3 |
| Nicholas Castellanos+ | 100 | 403 | 57 | 110 | 37 | 3 | 11 | 37 | .273 | 2 |
| Harold Castro | 97 | 354 | 30 | 103 | 10 | 4 | 5 | 38 | .291 | 4 |
| Willi Castro | 30 | 100 | 10 | 23 | 6 | 1 | 1 | 8 | .230 | 0 |
| Travis Demeritte | 48 | 169 | 24 | 38 | 7 | 2 | 3 | 10 | .225 | 3 |
| Brandon Dixon | 117 | 391 | 41 | 97 | 20 | 4 | 15 | 52 | .248 | 5 |
| Niko Goodrum | 112 | 423 | 61 | 105 | 27 | 5 | 12 | 45 | .248 | 12 |
| Grayson Greiner | 58 | 208 | 18 | 42 | 5 | 1 | 5 | 19 | .202 | 0 |
| Josh Harrison | 36 | 137 | 10 | 24 | 7 | 1 | 1 | 8 | .175 | 4 |
| John Hicks | 95 | 319 | 29 | 67 | 15 | 0 | 13 | 35 | .210 | 1 |
| JaCoby Jones | 88 | 298 | 39 | 70 | 19 | 3 | 11 | 26 | .235 | 7 |
| Dawel Lugo | 77 | 273 | 28 | 67 | 11 | 4 | 6 | 26 | .245 | 0 |
| Mikie Mahtook | 9 | 23 | 0 | 0 | 0 | 0 | 0 | 0 | .000 | 0 |
| Jordy Mercer | 74 | 256 | 24 | 69 | 16 | 0 | 9 | 22 | .270 | 0 |
| Dustin Peterson | 17 | 44 | 3 | 10 | 4 | 0 | 0 | 6 | .227 | 1 |
| Víctor Reyes | 69 | 276 | 29 | 84 | 16 | 5 | 3 | 25 | .304 | 9 |
| Ronny Rodríguez | 84 | 276 | 29 | 61 | 12 | 3 | 14 | 43 | .221 | 3 |
| Jake Rogers | 35 | 112 | 11 | 14 | 3 | 0 | 4 | 8 | .125 | 0 |
| Christin Stewart | 104 | 369 | 32 | 86 | 25 | 1 | 10 | 40 | .233 | 0 |
| Bobby Wilson | 15 | 44 | 2 | 4 | 1 | 0 | 0 | 2 | .091 | 0 |
| Pitcher totals | 161 | 23 | 2 | 4 | 0 | 0 | 0 | 0 | .174 | 0 |
| Team totals | 161 | 5549 | 582 | 1333 | 292 | 41 | 149 | 556 | .240 | 57 |

+Totals with Tigers only.

==== Starters and other pitchers ====
Note: W = Wins; L = Losses; ERA = Earned run average; G = Games pitched; GS = Games started; SV = Saves; IP = Innings pitched; R = Runs allowed; ER = Earned runs allowed; BB = Walks allowed; K = Strikeouts

| Player | W | L | ERA | G | GS | SV | IP | R | ER | BB | K |
|---|---|---|---|---|---|---|---|---|---|---|---|
| Tyler Alexander | 1 | 4 | 4.86 | 13 | 8 | 0 | 53 2/3 | 30 | 29 | 7 | 47 |
| Matthew Boyd | 9 | 12 | 4.56 | 32 | 32 | 0 | 185 1/3 | 101 | 94 | 50 | 238 |
| Ryan Carpenter | 1 | 6 | 9.30 | 9 | 9 | 0 | 40 2/3 | 46 | 42 | 13 | 25 |
| Edwin Jackson+ | 2 | 5 | 8.47 | 10 | 8 | 0 | 39 1/3 | 40 | 37 | 19 | 33 |
| Matt Moore | 0 | 0 | 0.00 | 2 | 2 | 0 | 10 | 0 | 0 | 1 | 9 |
| Daniel Norris | 3 | 13 | 4.49 | 32 | 29 | 0 | 144 1/3 | 75 | 72 | 38 | 125 |
| Tyson Ross | 1 | 5 | 6.11 | 7 | 7 | 0 | 35 1/3 | 28 | 24 | 18 | 25 |
| Gregory Soto | 0 | 5 | 5.77 | 33 | 7 | 0 | 57 2/3 | 39 | 37 | 33 | 45 |
| Spencer Turnbull | 3 | 17 | 4.61 | 30 | 30 | 0 | 148 1/3 | 86 | 76 | 59 | 146 |
| Drew VerHagen | 4 | 3 | 5.90 | 22 | 4 | 0 | 58 | 40 | 38 | 23 | 51 |
| Jordan Zimmermann | 1 | 13 | 6.91 | 23 | 23 | 0 | 112 | 89 | 86 | 25 | 82 |

+Totals with Tigers only.

==== Bullpen ====
Note: W = Wins; L = Losses; ERA = Earned run average; G = Games pitched; GS = Games started; SV = Saves; IP = Innings pitched; R = Runs allowed; ER = Earned runs allowed; BB = Walks allowed; K = Strikeouts

| Player | W | L | ERA | G | GS | SV | IP | R | ER | BB | K |
|---|---|---|---|---|---|---|---|---|---|---|---|
| Austin Adams | 0 | 0 | 5.14 | 13 | 0 | 0 | 14 | 8 | 8 | 10 | 9 |
| Victor Alcántara | 3 | 2 | 4.85 | 46 | 0 | 0 | 42 2/3 | 25 | 23 | 15 | 24 |
| Sandy Báez | 0 | 0 | 9.00 | 1 | 0 | 0 | 1 | 1 | 1 | 0 | 0 |
| José Cisnero | 0 | 4 | 4.33 | 35 | 0 | 0 | 35 1/3 | 21 | 17 | 19 | 40 |
| Brandon Dixon | 0 | 0 | 9.00 | 2 | 0 | 0 | 2 | 2 | 2 | 0 | 1 |
| Buck Farmer | 6 | 6 | 3.72 | 73 | 1 | 0 | 67 2/3 | 32 | 28 | 24 | 73 |
| José Fernández | 0 | 0 | 17.18 | 4 | 0 | 0 | 3 2/3 | 8 | 7 | 5 | 2 |
| Bryan Garcia | 0 | 0 | 12.15 | 7 | 0 | 0 | 6 2/3 | 9 | 9 | 5 | 7 |
| Reed Garrett | 0 | 0 | 8.22 | 13 | 0 | 0 | 15 1/3 | 15 | 14 | 13 | 10 |
| Shane Greene+ | 0 | 2 | 1.18 | 38 | 0 | 22 | 38 | 11 | 5 | 12 | 43 |
| Matt Hall | 0 | 1 | 7.71 | 16 | 0 | 0 | 23 1/3 | 20 | 20 | 15 | 27 |
| Blaine Hardy | 1 | 1 | 4.47 | 39 | 0 | 0 | 44 1/3 | 24 | 22 | 13 | 29 |
| Eduardo Jiménez | 0 | 0 | 5.91 | 8 | 0 | 0 | 10 2/3 | 7 | 7 | 5 | 8 |
| Joe Jiménez | 4 | 7 | 4.37 | 66 | 0 | 9 | 59 2/3 | 33 | 29 | 23 | 82 |
| David McKay | 0 | 0 | 5.59 | 18 | 0 | 0 | 19 1/3 | 12 | 12 | 9 | 29 |
| Nick Ramirez | 5 | 4 | 4.07 | 46 | 0 | 0 | 79 2/3 | 45 | 36 | 35 | 74 |
| Zac Reininger | 0 | 3 | 8.68 | 25 | 1 | 0 | 28 | 28 | 27 | 16 | 17 |
| Trevor Rosenthal | 0 | 0 | 7.00 | 10 | 0 | 0 | 9 | 8 | 7 | 11 | 12 |
| John Schreiber | 2 | 0 | 6.23 | 13 | 0 | 0 | 13 | 9 | 9 | 4 | 19 |
| Daniel Stumpf | 1 | 1 | 4.34 | 48 | 0 | 0 | 29 | 18 | 14 | 15 | 28 |
| Carlos Torres | 0 | 0 | 7.50 | 4 | 0 | 0 | 6 | 5 | 5 | 1 | 8 |
| Team Pitching Totals | 47 | 114 | 5.24 | 161 | 161 | 31 | 1433 | 915 | 835 | 536 | 1368 |

+Totals with Tigers only.

== Farm system ==
| Level | Team | League | Manager |
|---|---|---|---|
| AAA | Toledo Mud Hens | International League | Doug Mientkiewicz |
| AA | Erie SeaWolves | Eastern League | Mike Rabelo |
| A-Advanced | Lakeland Flying Tigers | Florida State League | Andrew Graham |
| A | West Michigan Whitecaps | Midwest League | Lance Parrish |
| A-Short Season | Connecticut Tigers | New York–Penn League | Brayan Peña |
| Rookie | GCL Tigers East | Gulf Coast League | Luis Lopez |
| Rookie | GCL Tigers West | Gulf Coast League | Gary Cathcart |
| Rookie | DSL Tigers 1 | Dominican Summer League | Ramon Zapata |
| Rookie | DSL Tigers 2 | Dominican Summer League | Marcos Yepez |
