= David McKay (baseball) =

American baseball player (born 1995)

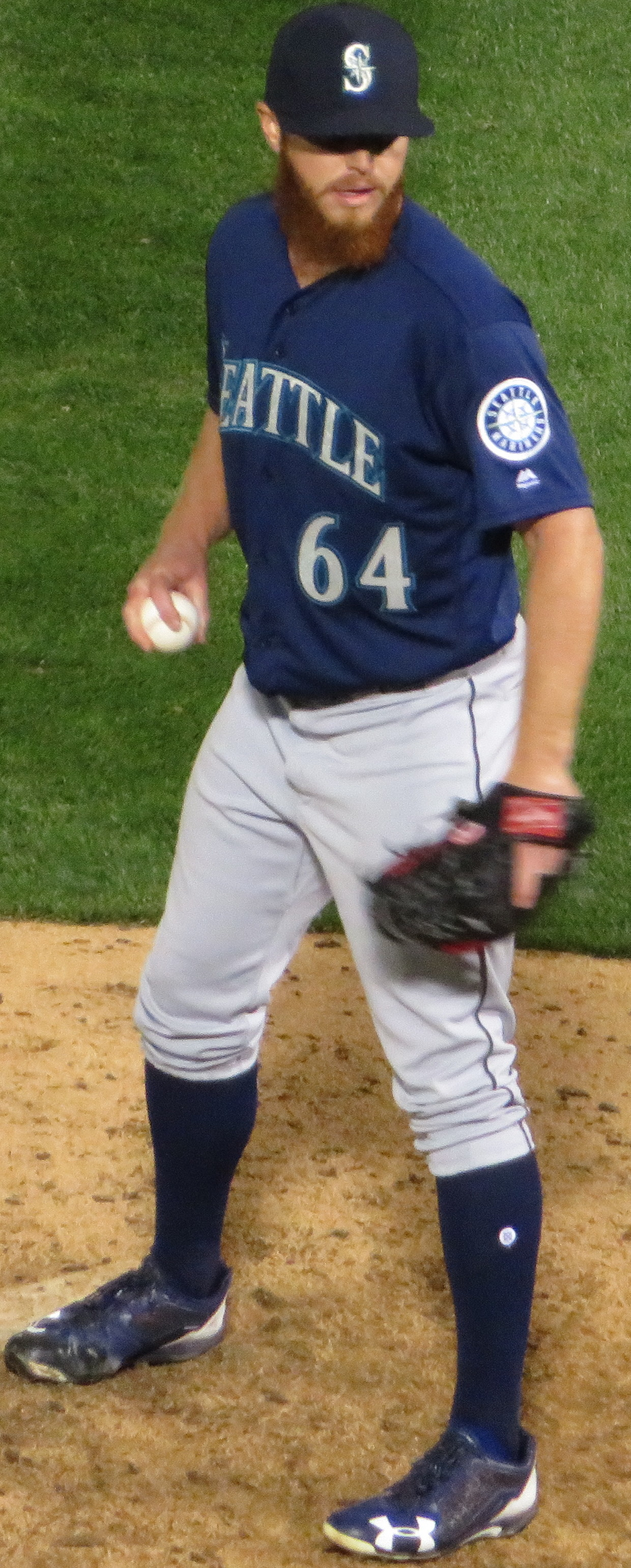
- McKay with the Seattle Mariners in 2019
- Pitcher
- Born: March 31, 1995 (age 31); Melbourne, Florida, U.S.
- Batted: Right Threw: Right

MLB debut
- May 20, 2019, for the Seattle Mariners

Last MLB appearance
- July 24, 2022, for the Oakland athletics

MLB statistics
- Win–loss record: 0–0
- Earned run average: 6.21
- Strikeouts: 37
- Stats at Baseball Reference

Teams
- Seattle Mariners (2019); Detroit Tigers (2019–2020); New York Yankees (2022); Tampa Bay Rays (2022); Oakland Athletics (2022)

David Armstrong McKay (born March 31, 1995) is an American former professional baseball pitcher. He played in Major League Baseball (MLB) for the Seattle Mariners, Detroit Tigers, New York Yankees, Tampa Bay Rays, and Oakland Athletics.

== Early life and college ==
McKay attended and played baseball at Viera High School in Viera, Florida. He was selected by the New York Mets in the 30th round of the 2013 Major League Baseball draft out of high school but opted to attend Florida Atlantic University to play college baseball for the Florida Atlantic Owls instead. McKay played three seasons for the Owls, receiving a medical redshirt as a freshman after an injury cut his season short after two games. As a redshirt sophomore, McKay went 3–6 with 3.74 ERA and a team-leading 66 strikeouts and .222 batting average against in 74.2 innings pitched. In 2015, he pitched in summer college baseball with the Bethesda Big Train, tallying a 2.25 ERA in 20 innings.

== Professional career ==
=== Kansas City Royals ===
McKay was selected by the Kansas City Royals in the 14th round, 433rd overall, of the 2016 MLB draft.

He played for the Burlington Royals in his debut season of 2016, accumulating a 3–3 record with a 2.64 ERA in 44 innings. He split 2017 between the Idaho Falls Chukars and the Lexington Legends, accumulating a 6–5 record with a 7.21 ERA in 88.2 innings.

=== Seattle Mariners ===
On March 20, 2018, McKay was traded to the Seattle Mariners in exchange for $1 in cash considerations. He split the 2018 season between the Modesto Nuts, the Arkansas Travelers, and the Tacoma Rainiers, accumulating a 6–2 record with a 2.58 ERA in 58 innings. McKay played for the Peoria Javelinas of the Arizona Fall League after the 2018 regular season.

On January 24, 2019, McKay was invited to major league spring training with the Mariners. McKay was called up to the majors for the first time on March 30, 2019. He was optioned to the Tacoma Rainiers on April 2, without appearing in a game. He was recalled to the major league roster on May 19, and made his debut on May 20 versus the Texas Rangers. During the 2019 season with Tacoma, McKay posted a 3–1 record, with a 5.15 ERA and 71 strikeouts in 30 appearances.

=== Detroit Tigers ===
On August 6, 2019, McKay was claimed off waivers by the Detroit Tigers. He was called up on August 14 and made his Tigers debut the next day against Seattle, the team he made his MLB debut with earlier in the season. In 19 1/3 innings, he struck out 29. On September 3, 2020, McKay was designated for assignment by the Tigers following the acquisition of Zack Short. He cleared waivers and was sent outright to the Tigers alternate training site on September 6.

=== New York Yankees ===
On March 13, 2022, After not pitching in 2021, McKay signed a minor league contract with the Tampa Bay Rays. On April 4, he was traded to the New York Yankees in exchange for $1. The Yankees added McKay to their 40-man roster and optioned him to the Scranton/Wilkes-Barre RailRiders on April 5. The Yankees promoted McKay to the major leagues on May 22. The Yankees designated McKay for assignment on June 21.

=== Tampa Bay Rays ===
On June 23, 2022, the Yankees traded McKay back to the Tampa Bay Rays for cash considerations. He made only one appearance for the club, allowing four runs on three hits in two innings pitched. McKay was designated for assignment by the Rays following the acquisition of Christian Bethancourt on July 9.

=== Oakland Athletics ===
On July 12, 2022, McKay was claimed off waivers by the Oakland Athletics. He was recalled on July 22, and made one appearance for the club, allowing one run in 2 2/3 innings of work. McKay was designated for assignment by Oakland following the promotion of Ken Waldichuk on September 1. He was released by the organization the following day.

=== High Point Rockers ===
On April 24, 2024, McKay signed with the High Point Rockers of the Atlantic League of Professional Baseball. In 21 games for the Rockers, he compiled a 3–1 record and 4.63 ERA with 20 strikeouts across 23 1/3 innings pitched. McKay was released by High Point on July 1.

On July 16, 2024, McKay announced his retirement from professional baseball via an Instagram post, as he would transition into working as a realtor.
