= Buck Farmer =

American baseball player (born 1991)

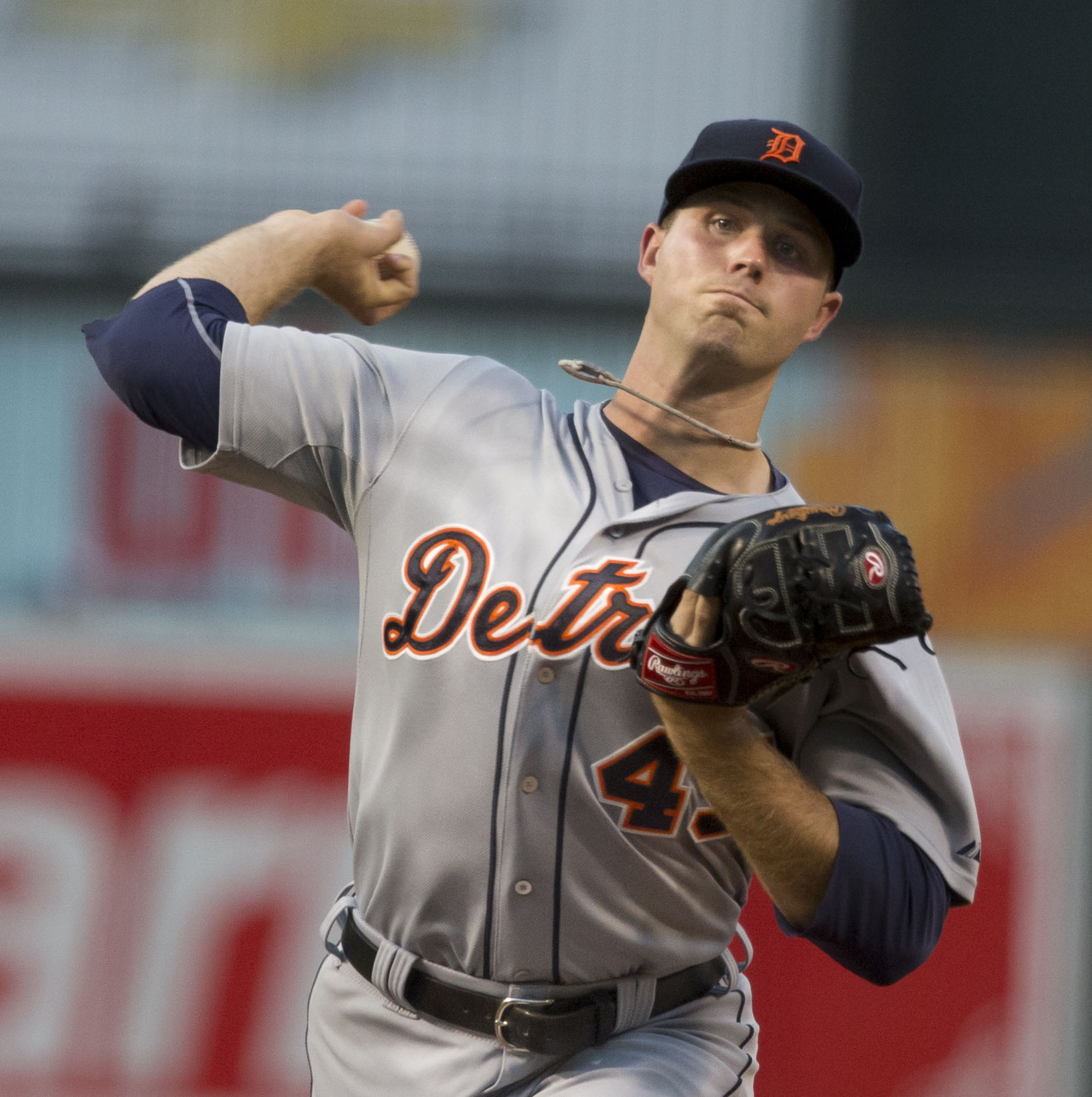
- Farmer with the Detroit Tigers in 2015

Free agent
- Pitcher
- Born: February 20, 1991 (age 35); Conyers, Georgia, U.S.
- Bats: Left Throws: Right

MLB debut
- August 13, 2014, for the Detroit Tigers

MLB statistics (through 2024 season)
- Win–loss record: 24–30
- Earned run average: 4.71
- Strikeouts: 486
- Stats at Baseball Reference

Teams
- Detroit Tigers (2014–2021); Cincinnati Reds (2022–2024)

George Runie "Buck" Farmer (born February 20, 1991) is an American professional baseball pitcher who is a free agent. He has previously played in Major League Baseball (MLB) for the Detroit Tigers and Cincinnati Reds.

== Early life ==
Farmer attended Rockdale County High School where he was a four-year letter winner and three-year captain. During his junior year, he posted a 1.50 earned run average (ERA), with a .443 batting average, while he posted a 2.02 ERA, with a .468 batting average during his senior year. Farmer holds the Rockdale single-game strikeout record with 22 against Dacula High School in 2008. He was named the most valuable player (MVP) of the 2008 Connie Mack World Series, and MVP of the 2008 World Wood Bat Championships. Farmer was drafted by the Atlanta Braves in the 46th round of the 2009 Major League Baseball draft, but did not sign and elected to play college baseball at the Georgia Institute of Technology for the Georgia Tech Yellow Jackets.

== College career ==
Farmer began his collegiate career at Georgia Tech in 2010. During his freshman season, he posted a 5–1 record, and a 3.63 ERA in 19 appearances. He recorded his first career win on March 14, in four innings of relief against Wake Forest, holding the Deacons to no runs on just two hits. During his sophomore season, Farmer posted an 11–3 record, and a 2.82 ERA in 16 starts. He went 8–1 in conference play. The eight conference wins were the most by any pitcher in the league in 2011. After the 2011 season, he played collegiate summer baseball with the Chatham Anglers of the Cape Cod Baseball League.

During his junior season, Farmer pitched a team-high 106 2/3 innings, third in the Atlantic Coast Conference (ACC). He posted a 3.54 ERA, and allowed just 100 hits with 37 walks and 115 strikeouts, third-most in the ACC. He was the ACC's only pitcher to pitch a complete-game shutout with his 1–0 win over Duke, earning him the ACC Pitcher of the Week and College Sports Madness National Pitcher of the Week. After the season, he was drafted by the Milwaukee Brewers in the 15th round of the 2012 Major League Baseball draft, but chose to return to Georgia Tech for his senior season. During his senior season, Farmer posted 9–5 record in 17 starts, and a 2.78 ERA in 113 1/3 innings with 122 strikeouts. He ranked second in the ACC in strikeouts, and finished with a career best in ERA, innings pitched, and strikeouts. He was a semifinalist for the ACC Pitcher of the Year.

== Professional career ==
=== Detroit Tigers ===
==== Minor Leagues ====
Farmer was drafted by the Detroit Tigers in the fifth round, with the 156th overall selection, of the 2013 Major League Baseball draft and signed.

Farmer began the 2014 season with the Single-A West Michigan Whitecaps, where he made 18 starts, before being promoted to the Double-A Erie SeaWolves, where he started two games. Between Single-A and Double-A, Farmer was 11–5, with a 2.65 ERA, allowing 101 hits over 115 2/3 innings with 127 strikeouts and 28 walks. After the season, Farmer was honored as Midwest League Pitcher of the Year.

==== 2014 ====
Farmer made his major league debut on August 13, 2014, in a game against the Pittsburgh Pirates. In his debut, he pitched five innings, allowing four runs on six hits, while striking out four, and earning a no-decision. He was optioned to the Triple-A Toledo Mud Hens following his debut. The Tigers called up Farmer again on August 23, 2014, to start the first game of a doubleheader against the Minnesota Twins. In his second major league start, Farmer pitched 1 1/3 innings, allowing seven runs on five hits, while walking two, and striking out three in a 12–4 loss.

==== 2015 ====
In 2015, Farmer made a spot start for the Tigers on May 28, against the Los Angeles Angels of Anaheim, when he allowed seven runs on nine hits in five innings. He was recalled by the Tigers on June 24, 2015. In 12 starts with the Mud Hens, Farmer posted a 3.56 ERA with 59 strikeouts and 22 walks in 68 1/3 innings.

==== 2016 ====
In 2016, Farmer made the Tigers opening day roster. On April 16, 2016, Farmer was optioned to the Toledo Mud Hens. Farmer was recalled to the Tigers on May 22, after Drew VerHagen was optioned to Toledo that same day. On September 21, 2016, Farmer made his first major league start of the year against the Minnesota Twins, however the game was suspended as a result of rain. In addition to the one start, Farmer made 13 relief appearances for the Tigers in 2016, posting a 4.60 ERA and 27 strikeouts in 29 1/3 innings pitched.

==== 2017 ====
In 2017, Farmer began the season with the Toledo Mud Hens. On May 26, Farmer received his second call-up of the year to Detroit. On May 27, Farmer started against the Chicago White Sox and recorded 11 strikeouts and zero earned runs giving him his first major league win. Farmer made 11 starts for the 2017 Tigers, going 5–5 with a 6.75 ERA and 49 strikeouts in 48 innings.

==== 2018 ====
With the exception of one spot start, Farmer pitched the entire 2018 season out of the Tigers bullpen. He made 66 appearances, posting a 3–4 record with a 4.15 ERA, while striking out 57 batters in 69 1/3 innings.

==== 2019 ====
Farmer again filled a bullpen role in 2019, with the exception of one spot start. He went 6–6 on the season with 73 strikeouts in 67 2/3 innings, while posting career bests in ERA (3.72) and WHIP (1.271).

==== 2020 ====
On January 10, 2020, the Tigers avoided arbitration with Farmer, agreeing on a one-year, $1.15 million contract. In the 2020 season (23 games), Farmer had a 3.80 ERA with 14 strikeouts in 21 1/3 innings.

==== 2021 ====
On January 15, 2021, the Tigers and Farmer agreed to a one-year, $1.85 million contract, avoiding arbitration. After pitching to a 12.66 ERA in 12 games to begin the season, Farmer was designated for assignment by the Tigers on May 7. He was outrighted to Triple-A Toledo on May 11. Farmer would return to the big leagues on June 13, as his contract was selected by the Tigers from Toledo. Between send-down and call-up, Farmer made nine appearances out of the bullpen in Toledo, pitching 11 1/3 innings, and ending with a 3.97 ERA helped greatly by a stretch of four straight scoreless outings immediately preceding his call-up. Farmer struggled to a 6.37 ERA in 35 1/3 innings for the Tigers. On August 14, Farmer was designated for assignment by the Tigers. On August 17, he was released by the Tigers.

=== Texas Rangers ===
On August 21, 2021, Farmer signed a minor league contract with the Texas Rangers organization and was assigned to the Round Rock Express of the Triple-A West. In 15 appearances for Round Rock, he logged a 2-1 record and 3.60 ERA with 15 strikeouts and eight saves over 15 innings of work. Farmer elected free agency following the season on November 7.

=== Cincinnati Reds ===
On March 16, 2022, Farmer signed a minor league contract with the Cincinnati Reds. On April 4, it was announced that Farmer had made Cincinnati's Opening Day roster. He was designated for assignment on May 6. On May 9, Farmer cleared waivers and was sent outright to the Triple-A Louisville Bats. Farmer elected free agency and re-signed with the Reds on a minor league contract the next day.

On July 9, 2022, Farmer was selected back to the active roster by Cincinnati. On August 1, Farmer earned his first career save in a 3-2 victory over the Baltimore Orioles. He finished the year having appeared in 44 games for the Reds, posting a 2-2 record and 3.83 ERA with 54 strikeouts and two saves in 47.0 innings pitched. He became a free agent following the 2023 season.

On December 28, 2023, Farmer re-signed with the Reds on a one-year, $2.25 million deal.

=== Atlanta Braves ===
On February 16, 2025, Farmer signed a minor league contract with the Atlanta Braves. In 5 appearances for the Triple-A Gwinnett Stripers, he struggled to a 1-0 record and 7.71 ERA with 7 strikeouts across 4 2/3 innings pitched. Farmer was released by the Braves organization on April 15.

=== Los Angeles Angels ===
On May 9, 2025, Farmer signed a minor league contract with the Los Angeles Angels. In 12 appearances for the Triple-A Salt Lake Bees, he struggled to a 1-2 record and 9.00 ERA with 11 strikeouts and two saves across 12 innings pitched. Farmer was released by the Angels organization on June 17.

=== Cincinnati Reds (second stint) ===
On July 1, 2025, Farmer signed a minor league contract with the Cincinnati Reds. In 25 appearances for the Triple-A Louisville Bats, he posted a 2-0 record and 1.98 ERA with 25 strikeouts and six saves across 27 1/3 innings pitched. Farmer elected free agency following the season on November 6.

== Scouting report ==
Throughout his career, Farmer relied on three pitches: a 91–95 MPH four-seam fastball (tops out at 97 MPH), a mid-80s MPH slider and a changeup. In 2015, he added a two-seam fastball to his repertoire in order to generate more groundballs, a philosophy taught to him by his AAA pitching coach, Mike Maroth.
