= Daniel Norris =

American baseball player (born 1993)

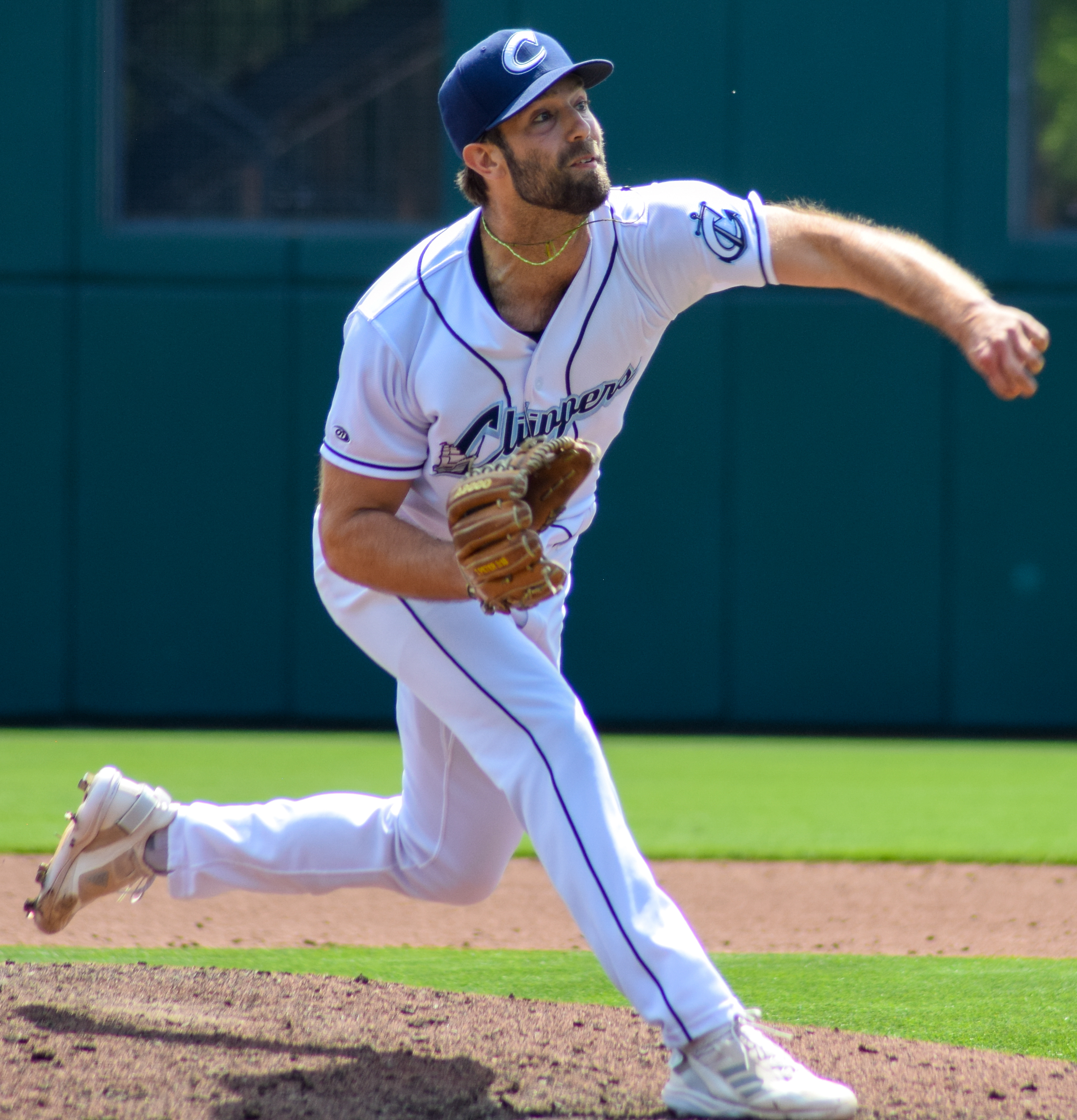
- Norris with the Columbus Clippers in 2023
- Pitcher
- Born: April 25, 1993 (age 33); Johnson City, Tennessee, U.S.
- Batted: Left Threw: Left

MLB debut
- September 5, 2014, for the Toronto Blue Jays

Last MLB appearance
- August 28, 2023, for the Cleveland Guardians

MLB statistics
- Win–loss record: 22–38
- Earned run average: 4.73
- Strikeouts: 545
- Stats at Baseball Reference

Teams
- Toronto Blue Jays (2014–2015); Detroit Tigers (2015–2021); Milwaukee Brewers (2021); Chicago Cubs (2022); Detroit Tigers (2022); Cleveland Guardians (2023)

Daniel David Norris (born April 25, 1993) is an American former professional baseball pitcher. He played in Major League Baseball (MLB) for the Toronto Blue Jays, Detroit Tigers, Milwaukee Brewers, Chicago Cubs, and Cleveland Guardians.

== Minor league career ==
=== 2011–2012 ===
The Blue Jays drafted Norris in the second round (74th overall) of the 2011 MLB draft. Baseball America rated Norris as the 91st best prospect in baseball prior to the 2012 season. He was ranked as the number 4 prospect in the Blue Jays minor league organization on July 26, 2013, when the revised Top 100 Prospects list was released.

Norris began his career with the Rookie-Advanced Bluefield Blue Jays and Low-A Vancouver Canadians in 2012, where he pitched to a combined 2–4 record, an earned run average (ERA) of 8.44, and a 1.78 walks plus hits per inning pitched (WHIP) ratio.

=== 2013–2014 ===
In 2013, Norris split time with the Single-A Lansing Lugnuts and High-A Dunedin Blue Jays, and finished the season with a 2–7 record, but made a major improvement with his ERA, which dropped to 3.97.

Norris began the 2014 season in Dunedin, and earned a 3–0 record with an ERA of 0.80 through his first nine starts. On June 3, 2014, he was announced as the Pipeline Pitching Prospect of the Month of May. He posted a 1–0 record and a 0.68 ERA over five starts to win the award. On June 15, he was called up to the Double-A New Hampshire Fisher Cats after posting a 6–0 record, 1.22 ERA, and 1.025 WHIP in 13 starts with Dunedin. Norris appeared in the 2014 All-Star Futures Game on June 24, 2014.

As of the 2014 midseason update, he was considered the Blue Jays' top prospect, and 25th overall prospect in baseball by Baseball America. With New Hampshire, Norris had a 3–1 win–loss record, 4.54 ERA, and struck out 49 in 35 2/3 innings before he was promoted to the Triple-A Buffalo Bisons on August 7. Making his Triple-A debut pitching in the first game of a double-header on August 10, Norris earned the win, pitching six innings against the Durham Bulls and gave up only two hits while striking out 10, including Wil Myers, on a rehabilitation assignment for the Tampa Bay Rays. In his following start, he struck out a career-high 13 over 5 2/3 innings, making him the first pitcher in Bisons history to have back-to-back starts with at least 10 strikeouts. Norris pitched five innings and earned his third win in three tries on August 21, against the Scranton/Wilkes-Barre RailRiders. He struck out nine, walked three, and gave up one hit, a home run. While speculation circulated that the Blue Jays intended to move Norris to the bullpen following his third Triple-A start, they instead announced on August 22 that he would continue in a starter's role. In total for 2014, he posted a 12–2 record with a 2.53 ERA and 163 strikeouts over 124 2/3 innings. On September 3, Baseball America named him to their First Team All-Stars for 2014. He was named to the MLB All-Prospect Team on September 26.

== Major league career ==
=== Toronto Blue Jays (2014–2015) ===
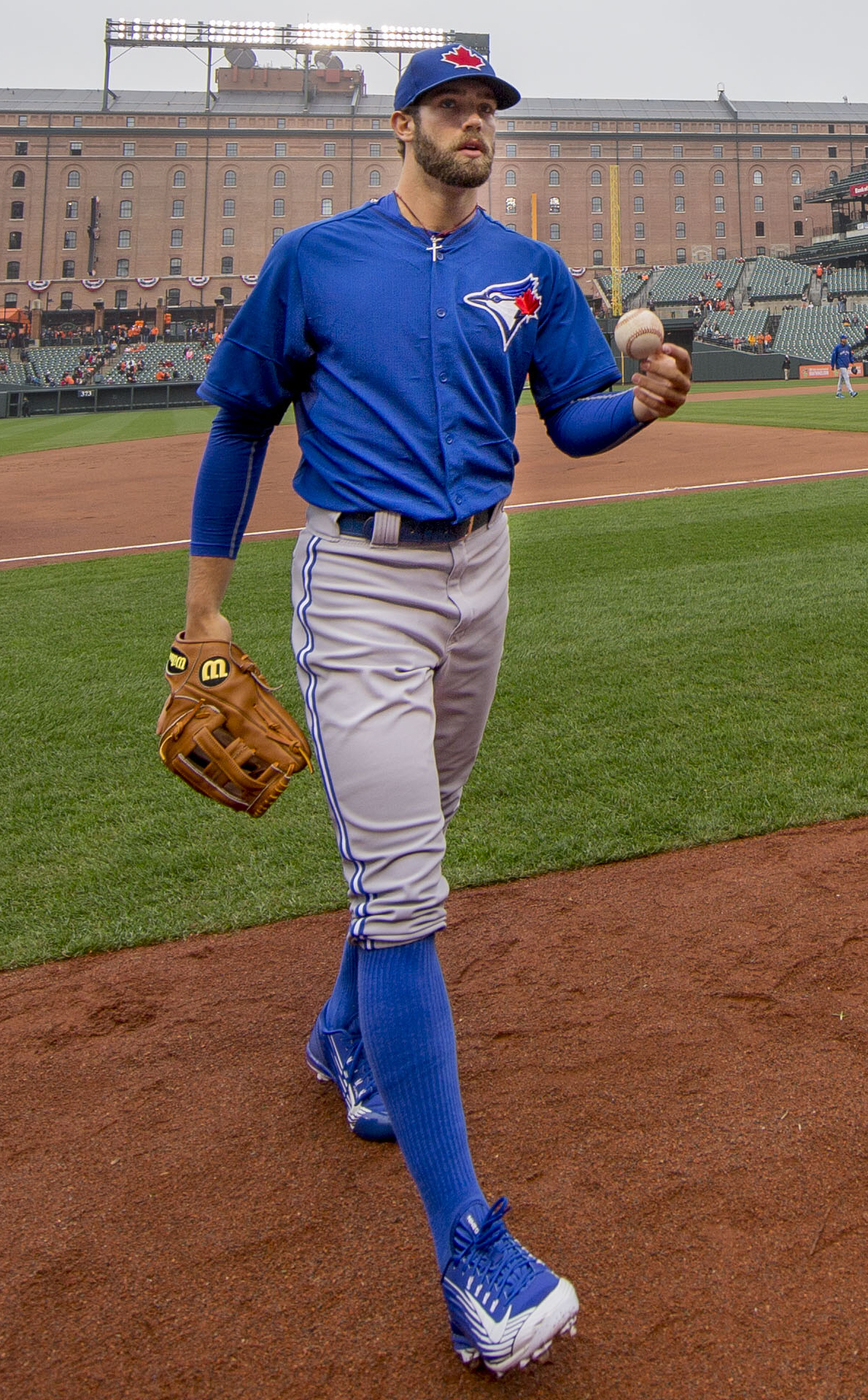
Norris with the Toronto Blue Jays in 2015

On September 1, 2014, Norris was called up to the Blue Jays as part of the September roster expansion. On September 5, he made his MLB debut against the Boston Red Sox, striking out David Ortiz. Blue Jays manager John Gibbons announced on September 23 that Norris would make his first major league start on September 25, and would pitch 2–3 innings. Norris pitched 3 1/3 innings and yielded two earned runs on one hit, two walks, while striking out one. In total for 2014, Norris pitched 6 2/3 innings with the Blue Jays, and post a 5.40 ERA, four strikeouts, and a 1.50 WHIP.

Norris had arthroscopic surgery on October 7, 2014, to remove bone spurs and loose bodies from his left (pitching) elbow.

On January 21, 2015, Norris was named by MLB as the third-best LHP prospect in baseball. In 2015, MLB named Norris as the number 1 Blue Jays' prospect, the number 3 left-handed pitching prospect in baseball, and the 17th best prospect overall. He opened the 2015 season in the starting rotation for the Blue Jays. After his fifth start, Norris was optioned to Triple-A Buffalo on May 1.

=== Detroit Tigers ===
==== 2015 ====
On July 30, 2015, Norris was traded to the Detroit Tigers along with Matt Boyd and Jairo Labourt in exchange for David Price. In his debut for the Tigers on August 2, Norris pitched 7 1/3 innings and struck out five Baltimore Orioles hitters, allowing one walk, four hits, and just one earned run on a solo home run by Chris Davis in the fourth inning. Following the home run to Davis, Norris retired the next 12 batters in a row, earning the win in a 6–1 Tigers victory.

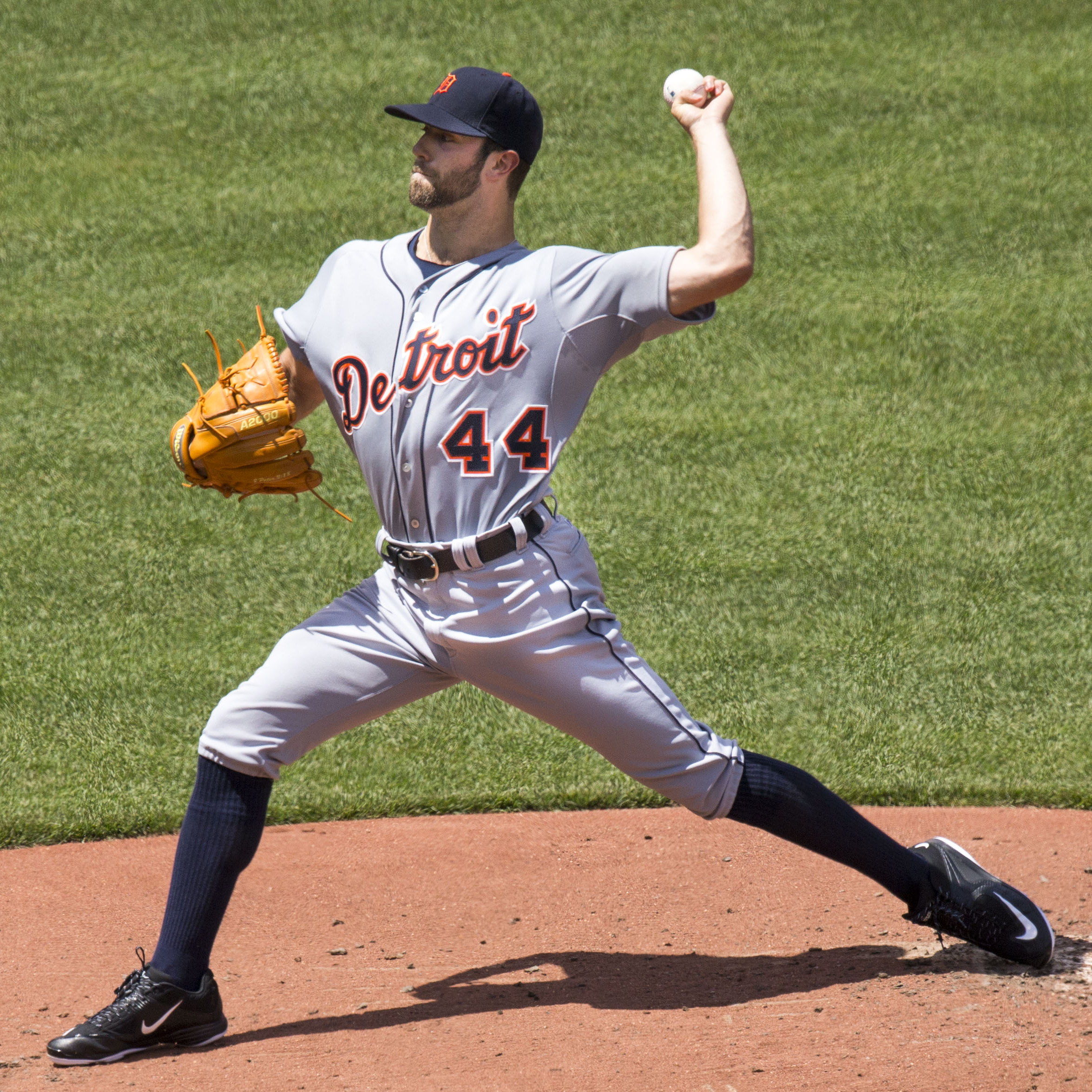
Norris with the Tigers in August 2015

On August 19, 2015, Norris became the first Tigers pitcher to hit a home run in his first career plate appearance, the first pitcher to do so since Tommy Milone in 2011, and the first American League pitcher to do so since Esteban Yan in 2000. He also became the first Tigers pitcher to homer since Jason Johnson did so on June 8, 2005, and the first American League pitcher to ever hit a regular-season home run at Wrigley Field. Norris exited the game in the fifth inning with a right oblique strain, and was placed on the disabled list the following day. Norris is the last Detroit Tiger pitcher to hit a home run in either a regular season or playoff game.

Norris was recalled from the disabled list on September 16. In his second start after returning from the injury, he threw five perfect innings in a September 22 game against the Chicago White Sox, but was pulled from the game after reaching a predetermined pitch count. The Tigers eventually lost the bid for a combined no-hitter with one out in the ninth inning when Neftali Feliz, the fifth pitcher used, surrendered a triple to Tyler Saladino.

Norris finished the 2015 season (combined stats between Toronto and Detroit) with a 3–2 record in 13 starts, while compiling a 3.75 ERA and 45 strikeouts in 60 innings.

==== 2016 ====
On March 24, 2016, the Tigers announced that Norris would start the 2016 season on the disabled list, due to a lower back issue suffered during spring training. He was recalled to the Tigers on May 11, 2016, but made only a one-inning appearance against the Baltimore Orioles on May 12 before being returned to Triple–A Toledo. Norris was recalled again on June 21 following the demotion of Matt Boyd, and made his first start of the 2016 season on June 23. After pitching two innings plus one batter in a July 4 start against the Cleveland Indians, Norris was removed from the game. He was later diagnosed with an oblique strain, the same injury he suffered in late 2015, and was placed on the disabled list for the third time in his career. Norris returned to the mound for the Tigers on August 9 to start a game against the Seattle Mariners. In a September 12 game against the Minnesota Twins, Norris struck out a career-high 11 batters in just 6 1/3 innings. Norris made 13 starts for the Tigers in 2016, finishing the season with a 4–2 record and a 3.38 ERA, while striking out 71 batters in 69 1/3 innings.

==== 2017 ====
Although he logged the most innings of his young career (101 2/3), Norris took a step backward in 2017, posting a 5–8 record and a 5.31 ERA while striking out 86 batters. Norris dealt with hip and quadriceps issues during the season, and admitted he dug a "deeper hole" by trying to come back too soon from a DL stint.

==== 2018 ====
Norris started the season in the bullpen as a long reliever. He made a spot start on April 29 but came out of the game in the third inning with groin tightness, which he has been dealing with since 2017. He was placed on the 10-day disabled list the next day which marked the fourth straight season on the DL since the Tigers acquired him. It was announced a day later that the injury would require surgery and Norris would miss 8 to 12 weeks. He was moved to the 60-day disabled list on May 8. Norris returned from the disabled list on September 1 but came out of the game in the fifth inning with a left leg injury right after giving up a 2-run home run which earned him the loss. The home run was the only hit he gave up that game. During the 2018 season, Norris started eight games and appeared in three relief appearances, going 0–5 with a 5.68 ERA.

==== 2019 ====
On January 11, 2019, the Tigers avoided arbitration with Norris, agreeing on a one-year, $1.275 million contract. Norris ended the season with a 3–13 record despite setting career highs in games (32), starts (29), innings (144 1/3) and strikeouts (125). In the latter part of the season, the Tigers limited Norris to three innings per start in an effort to manage his workload.

==== 2020 ====
On January 10, 2020, the Tigers avoided arbitration with Norris, agreeing on a one-year contract worth $2,962,500. On July 9, 2020, it was announced that Norris had tested positive for COVID-19. Norris was later cleared to join the Opening Day roster. In 14 games during the 2020 season, Norris went 3–1 with a 3.25 ERA and 28 strikeouts in 27 2/3 innings.

==== 2021 ====
On January 15, 2021, the Tigers and Norris agreed on a one-year, $3.475 million contract, avoiding arbitration. On March 26, Tigers manager A. J. Hinch announced that Norris would start the 2021 season in the bullpen. In 38 games for the 2021 Tigers, Norris was 1–3 with a 5.89 ERA and 40 strikeouts in 36 2/3 innings.

=== Milwaukee Brewers ===
On July 30, 2021, Norris was traded to the Milwaukee Brewers in exchange for minor league prospect Reese Olson. Norris appeared in 18 games for the Brewers.

=== Chicago Cubs ===
On March 19, 2022, Norris officially agreed to a one-year contract with the Chicago Cubs. He was designated for assignment on July 17, 2022. He was released on July 23.

=== Detroit Tigers (second stint) ===
On July 26, 2022, Norris signed a minor league contract with the Detroit Tigers. He was assigned to the Triple-A Toledo Mud Hens. Norris was called up from Toledo on August 11. He recorded two wins in 14 games, and became a free agent at the end of the season.

=== Cleveland Guardians ===
On February 15, 2023, Norris signed a minor league contract with the Cincinnati Reds organization. He was released by the Reds on March 20.

On March 24, 2023, Norris signed a minor league contract with the Cleveland Guardians organization. He made 14 appearances (nine starts) for the Triple–A Columbus Clippers, recording a 6.93 ERA with 32 strikeouts in 37 2/3 innings pitched. On June 17, Norris was selected to the major league roster following an injury to Triston McKenzie. He tossed two scoreless innings out of the bullpen in his only appearance before he was designated for assignment following the promotion of Gavin Williams on June 21. On June 23, Norris cleared waivers and was sent outright to Triple–A Columbus. On July 24, the Guardians selected Norris' contract, adding him back to the major league roster. He posted a 4.15 ERA and 1.62 WHIP in 5 games for Cleveland before he was designated for assignment again on August 17. After clearing waivers, Norris elected free agency in lieu of accepting another outright assignment to Columbus. Norris re-signed with the Guardians organization on a minor league contract on August 23. The Guardians selected Norris' contract once again on August 28. Norris was designated for assignment once more on August 29. After clearing waivers, he accepted an outright assignment to Columbus on September 2. Norris elected free agency on October 2.

== International career ==
On October 29, 2018, he was selected MLB All-Stars at 2018 MLB Japan All-Star Series

== Pitching style ==
Norris features four-seam and two-seam fastballs that average about 92 miles per hour (148 km/h) and top out at 96 miles per hour (154 km/h). He also throws a slider and a circle change that both average about 85 miles per hour (137 km/h), and a curveball in the mid 70s. He learned all of the pitches by his senior year of high school. In 2012, he overhauled his pitching mechanics to improve the repetitiveness of his delivery.

== Personal life ==
Norris is a Christian. Norris has said, “I know God has a plan no matter what. No longer do I live and die by my success. I live and die by my faith in God. Everything after that is just an added blessing.”

Norris' family has owned a bicycle shop in Johnson City, Tennessee, for more than 80 years. In the offseason, Norris lives by choice in a 1978 Volkswagen Westfalia van, nicknamed "Shaggy”. His unconventional lifestyle can be described as nonconformist and minimalist, and has raised eyebrows in MLB. Prior to the 2015 season, Tony LaCava, Toronto's assistant general manager said of Norris, "He takes care of himself as well as anybody we've got. He's in great shape. He competes on the mound. If that wasn't the case, maybe we'd be more worried about some of the other stuff. But right now, the van and all that is secondary. He has great values, and they're working for him."

Despite his $2 million signing bonus, Norris lives off just $800 a month. In an interview with ESPN he was asked why he chooses to continue to live so conservatively. He asked back, "Who am I to deserve that? What have I really done?" He has also said, "I'm actually more comfortable being kind of poor," as it helps him maintain a minimalist lifestyle and resist conformity.

On October 19, 2015, Norris announced through his Instagram account that he had been diagnosed with thyroid cancer. He was diagnosed the previous April, and with a doctor's consent, he continued playing and delayed treatment until the end of the season. On October 29, Norris announced he was cancer-free following a successful surgery to remove a malignant growth from his thyroid.

One of Norris' hobbies is photography. During the 2015 season, he acquired professional photographer Ben Moon's Canon EF 85mm portrait lens, and the two became friends. That offseason, the two went on a road trip together, from Norris' home state of Tennessee to Oregon, where Moon is based. Moon has turned footage from the trip into a short film, titled "Offseason".

Norris has been in a relationship with professional surfer Sage Erickson since 2021. The pair married in November 2023.

== See also ==
- List of Major League Baseball players with a home run in their first major league at-bat
