= Zac Reininger =

American baseball pitcher (born 1993)

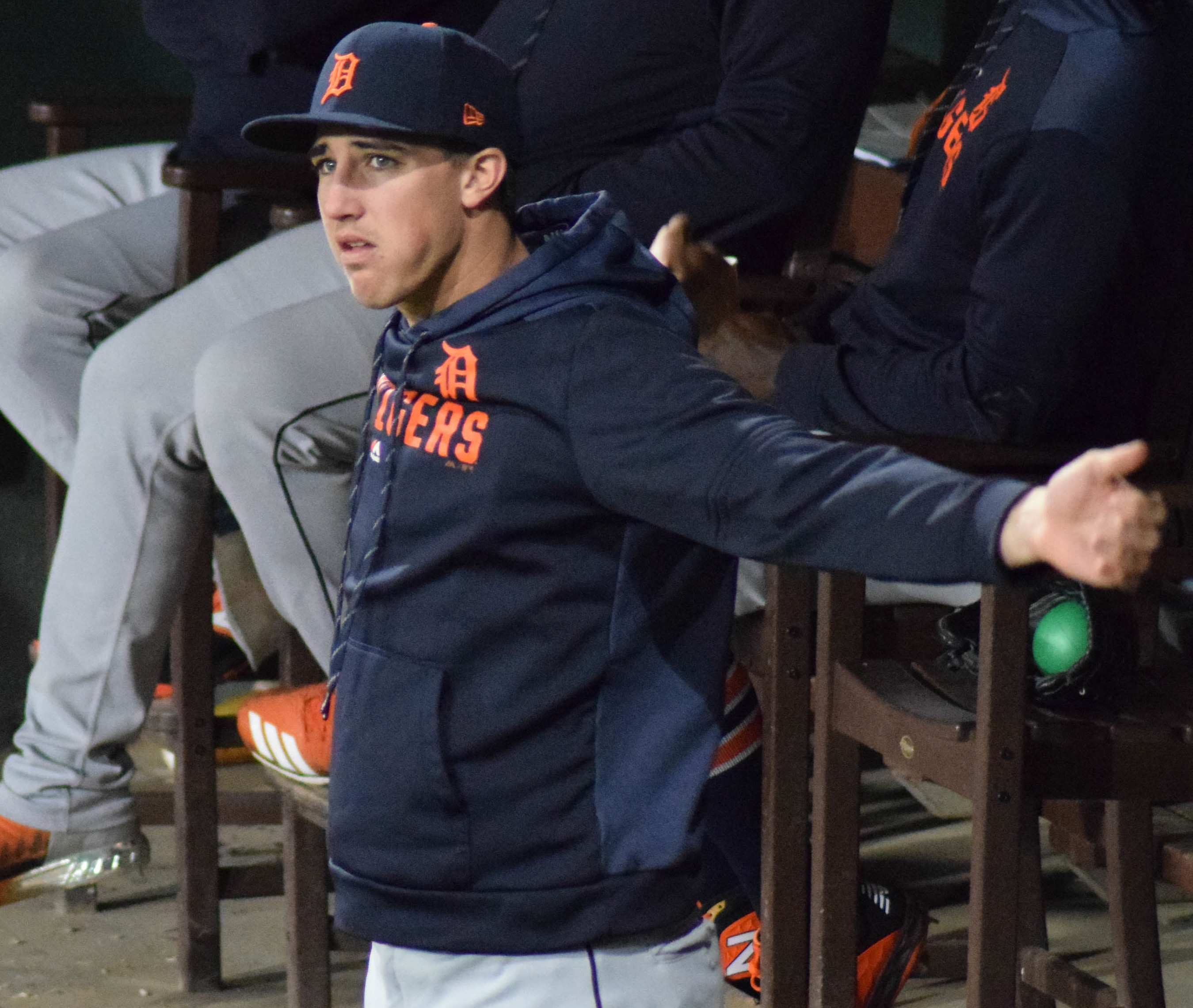
- Reininger with the Tigers in 2019
- Pitcher
- Born: January 28, 1993 (age 33); San Antonio, Texas, U.S.
- Bats: Switch Throws: Right

MLB debut
- August 27, 2017, for the Detroit Tigers

MLB statistics (through 2019 season)
- Win–loss record: 1–3
- Earned run average: 8.08
- Strikeouts: 40
- Stats at Baseball Reference

Teams
- Detroit Tigers (2017–2019)

Zachary Ryan Reininger (born January 28, 1993) is an American professional former baseball pitcher. He played in Major League Baseball (MLB) for the Detroit Tigers.

== Career ==
Reininger attended Smithson Valley High School in Spring Branch, Texas.

=== Detroit Tigers ===
Reininger attended Hill College in Hillsboro, Texas and was drafted by the Detroit Tigers in the 8th round (246th overall) of the 2013 Major League Baseball draft. In 2015, Reininger suffered an elbow injury that required Tommy John surgery. As a result, Reininger missed the second half of the year in 2015 and the vast majority of the entire 2016 season.

On August 23, 2017, the Detroit Tigers announced the addition of Reininger to their 40-man roster and his subsequent call-up to the active roster effective the next day. At the time of his call-up, Reininger was pitching for Tigers' Triple-A affiliate, the Toledo Mud Hens, where he had a 1–0 record, 1.59 ERA, and held opponents to a .179 average in 11 1/3 innings of work. He made his Major League debut on August 27, 2017, where he struck out a man and gave up two runs on three hits and a walk in an inning of work. Reininger was again called up on May 8, 2018, to fill in for injured players. He made 18 appearances for the Tigers 2018, recording an ERA of 7.59 in 21 1/3 innings. At Toledo in 2018, he went 5–1 with a 2.63 ERA in 51 1/3 innings.

Reininger made 25 appearances for Detroit in 2019, struggling to an 8.68 ERA with 17 strikeouts across 28 innings pitched. Reininger was outrighted off the Tigers roster on October 23, 2019. He elected free agency following the season on November 4.

=== Oakland Athletics ===
On April 1, 2020, Reininger signed a minor league deal with the Oakland Athletics. He did not play in a game in 2020 due to the cancellation of the minor league season because of the COVID-19 pandemic.

On November 2, 2020, Reininger re–signed with the Athletics organization on a new minor league contract. He spent the 2021 season with the Double–A Midland RockHounds, making 5 starts and registering a 1–4 record and 4.63 ERA with 23 strikeouts across 23 1/3 innings pitched. Reininger elected free agency following the season on November 7, 2021.

=== Cleburne Railroaders ===
On August 1, 2022, Reininger signed with the Cleburne Railroaders of the American Association of Professional Baseball. In two appearances for Cleburne, he surrendered two runs on three hits in two innings of work. Reininger was released by the Railroaders on October 17.

=== Winnipeg Goldeyes ===
On February 8, 2024, Reininger signed with the Winnipeg Goldeyes of the American Association of Professional Baseball. In 19 starts for Winnipeg, he compiled a 9–5 record and 4.49 ERA with 65 strikeouts across 114 1/3 innings pitched.

Reininger re-signed with the Goldeyes on May 9, 2025. He made one scoreless appearance for the team, and was released on May 11.

=== Kansas City Monarchs ===
On June 19, 2025, Reininger signed with the Kansas City Monarchs of the American Association of Professional Baseball. In two appearances for Kansas City, Reininger recorded a 6.00 ERA with five strikeouts over three innings of work.

On June 24, 2025, Reininger was traded to the Cleburne Railroaders in exchange for a player to be named later. He was released two days later without appearing for the team.
