= Sandy Báez =

Dominican baseball pitcher (born 1993)

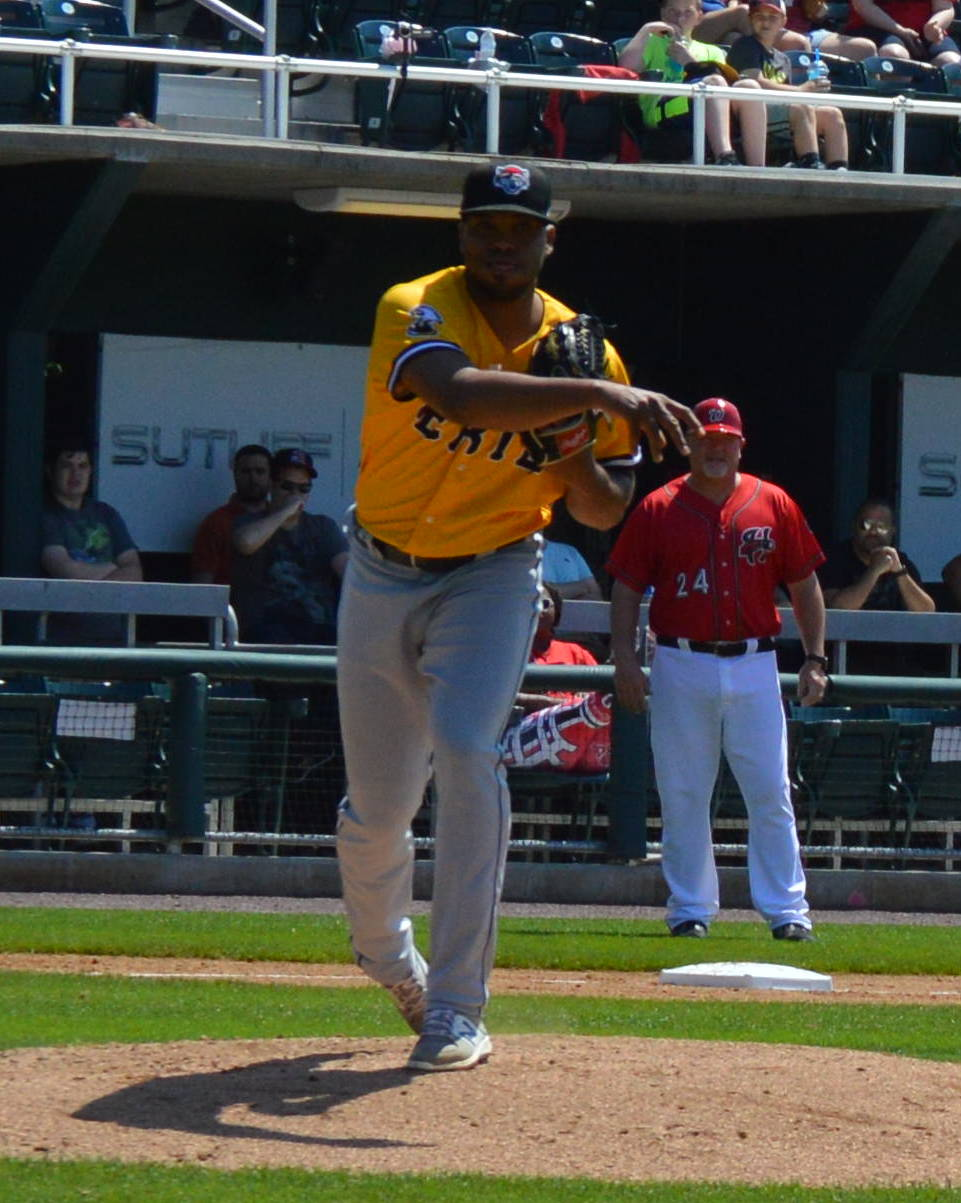
- Báez with the Erie SeaWolves in 2018
- Pitcher
- Born: November 25, 1993 (age 32); Juan Baron, Dominican Republic
- Batted: Right Threw: Right

MLB debut
- June 4, 2018, for the Detroit Tigers

Last MLB appearance
- May 17, 2019, for the Detroit Tigers

MLB statistics
- Win–loss record: 0–0
- Earned run average: 5.28
- Strikeout: 10
- Stats at Baseball Reference

Teams
- Detroit Tigers (2018–2019)

Sandy Báez (born November 25, 1993) is a Dominican former professional baseball pitcher. He played in Major League Baseball (MLB) for the Detroit Tigers.

== Career ==
=== Detroit Tigers ===
Báez signed with the Detroit Tigers as an international free agent on October 6, 2011. He made his professional debut in 2012 for the Dominican Summer League Tigers and spent the whole season there, going 0–3 with a 5.21 ERA in ten games (nine starts). He returned there in 2013, compiling an 8–1 record and 2.05 ERA in 14 games (ten starts). In 2014, he pitched for the Gulf Coast League Tigers where he was 1–2 with a 3.06 ERA and 1.26 WHIP in 12 starts, and in 2015, he played with the Low–A Connecticut Tigers where he pitched to a 3–4 record and 4.13 ERA in 14 games started. He spent 2016 with the Single–A West Michigan Whitecaps where he was 7–9 with a 3.81 ERA in 21 starts.

On November 18, 2016, the Tigers added Báez to their 40-man roster to protect him from the Rule 5 draft. He spent 2017 with both the High–A Lakeland Flying Tigers and the Double–A Erie SeaWolves, compiling a combined 6–8 record and 3.92 ERA in 19 starts between the two teams. The Tigers called up Baez as the 26th man for their doubleheader against the New York Yankees on June 4, 2018. He pitched 4 1/3 scoreless innings with three walks and four strikeouts in the first game of the doubleheader and was sent back down to Erie after the second game. Báez was recalled by the Tigers on September 1, as a September call-up. He played for the Mesa Solar Sox of the Arizona Fall League after the 2018 regular season. In 2019, he was optioned to the Triple–A Toledo Mud Hens to open the season. On August 9, 2019, Baez was released by the Tigers. Baez re-signed with the Tigers on a minor league deal on August 13.

Báez did not play in a game in 2020 due to the cancellation of the minor league season because of the COVID-19 pandemic. He became a free agent on November 2, 2020.

=== Long Island Ducks ===
On March 29, 2022, Báez signed with the Long Island Ducks of the Atlantic League of Professional Baseball for the 2022 season. In 39 appearances, Báez registered a 3.15 ERA with 38 strikeouts and 5 saves in 45 2/3 innings pitched. He became a free agent following the season.

=== Guelph Royals ===
On May 15, 2023, Báez signed with the Guelph Royals of the Intercounty Baseball League. He became a free agent following the 2024 season.
