= Victor Alcántara =

Dominican baseball player (born 1993)

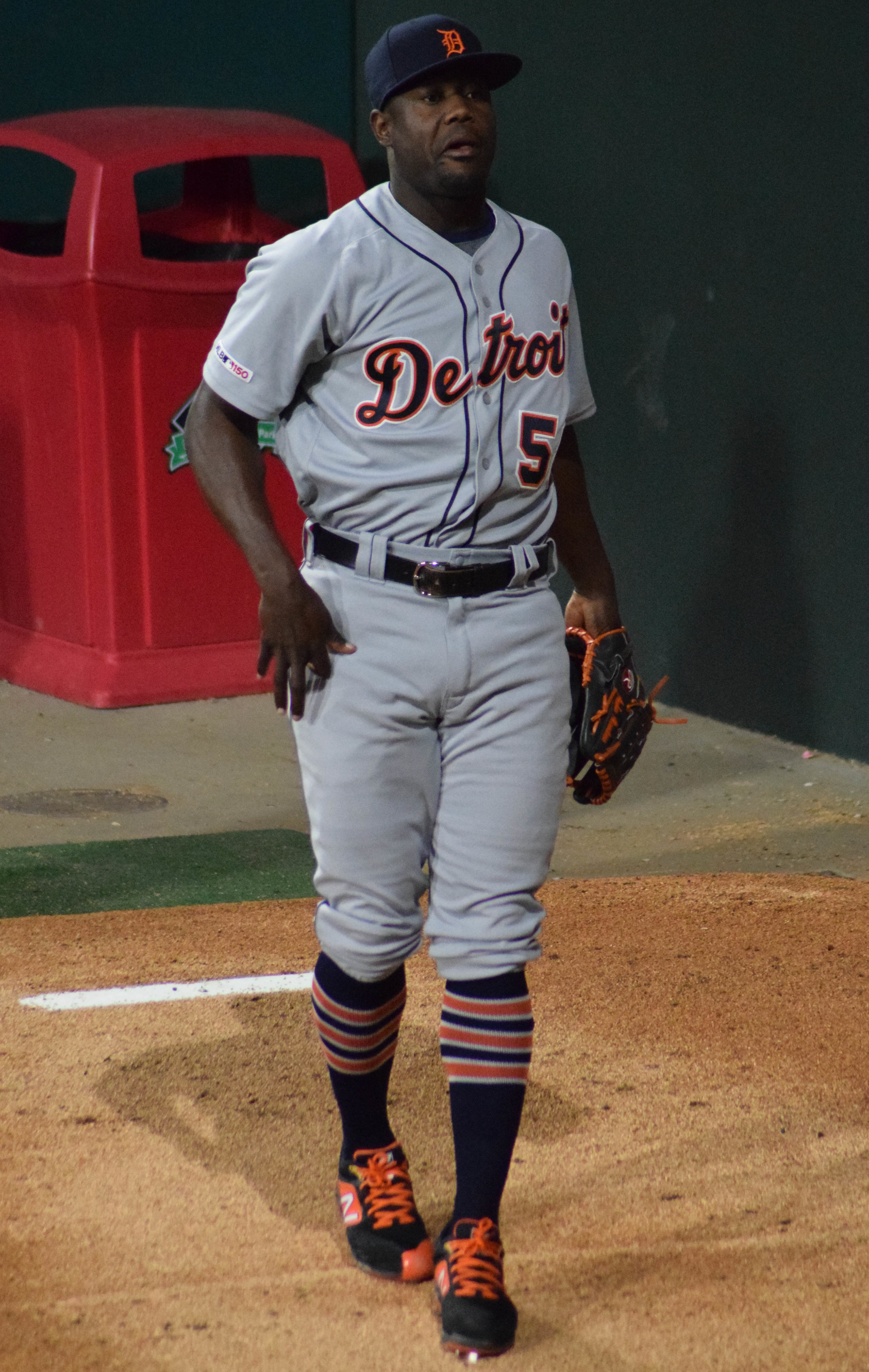
- Alcántara with the Detroit Tigers in 2019
- Pitcher
- Born: April 3, 1993 (age 32); Santo Domingo, Dominican Republic
- Batted: Right Threw: Right

MLB debut
- September 5, 2017, for the Detroit Tigers

Last MLB appearance
- September 29, 2019, for the Detroit Tigers

MLB statistics
- Win–loss record: 4–3
- Earned run average: 4.28
- Strikeouts: 50
- Stats at Baseball Reference

Teams
- Detroit Tigers (2017–2019)

Victor Alfonso Alcántara (born April 3, 1993) is a Dominican former professional baseball pitcher. He has played in Major League Baseball (MLB) for the Detroit Tigers.

== Career ==
=== Los Angeles Angels ===
Alcántara signed with the Los Angeles Angels of Anaheim as an international free agent in May 2012. He made his professional debut with the Dominican Summer League Angels that year. He spent 2013 with the Orem Owlz of the Rookie-level Pioneer League and 2014 with the Burlington Bees of the Class A Midwest League. In 2014, he was selected to represent the Angels at the All-Star Futures Game. Alcántara started 2015 with the Inland Empire 66ers of the Class A-Advanced California League. The Angels added him to their 40-man roster after the season.

=== Detroit Tigers ===
After the 2016 season, the Angels traded Alcántara to the Detroit Tigers in exchange for Cameron Maybin. He pitched for the Erie SeaWolves of the Class AA Eastern League and the Toledo Mud Hens of the Class AAA International League. The Tigers promoted Alcántara to the major leagues on September 5, 2017, and made his major league debut that day. He cleared outright waivers on December 11, 2017.

==== 2018 ====
Alcántara started the 2018 season with the Triple-A Toledo Mud Hens, and the Tigers called him up on July 5, 2018. He pitched 30 innings at the major league level in 2018, posting a 2.40 ERA with 21 strikeouts.

==== 2019 ====
Alcántara made the team out of spring training in 2019 and earned the opening day win out of the bullpen against the Toronto Blue Jays. Alcántara was outrighted off the Tigers roster and elected free agency on October 24.

==== 2020 ====
On February 21, 2020, Alcántara was suspended for 80 games for violating the major league drug program when he tested positive for the performance-enhancing substance Stanozolol.

== See also ==
- List of Major League Baseball players suspended for performance-enhancing drugs
