= Nick Ramirez =

American baseball player (born 1989)

Free agent
- Pitcher
- Born: August 1, 1989 (age 37); Anaheim, California, U.S.
- Bats: Left Throws: Left

MLB debut
- May 11, 2019, for the Detroit Tigers

MLB statistics (through 2024 season)
- Win–loss record: 7–7
- Earned run average: 4.21
- Strikeouts: 132
- Stats at Baseball Reference

Teams
- Detroit Tigers (2019–2020); San Diego Padres (2021); New York Yankees (2023); Los Angeles Dodgers (2024)

Nicholas Randolph Ramirez (born August 1, 1989) is an American professional baseball pitcher who is a free agent. He has previously played in Major League Baseball (MLB) for the Detroit Tigers, San Diego Padres, New York Yankees, and Los Angeles Dodgers.

Ramirez played college baseball for the Cal State Fullerton Titans before the Milwaukee Brewers selected him in the 2011 MLB draft as a first baseman. After converting into a relief pitcher in 2017, Ramirez made his MLB debut with the Tigers in 2019. After pitching for Detroit through the 2020 season, he pitched for the Padres in 2021 and the Yankees in 2023.

== Career ==
=== Amateur career ===
Ramirez attended Katella High School in Anaheim, California. He enrolled at California State University, Fullerton and played college baseball for the Cal State Fullerton Titans as a first baseman and pitcher. As the Titans' closer, Ramirez was 16-for-16 in converting save opportunities. In 2011, he was named the Big West Conference's player of the year.

=== Milwaukee Brewers ===
The Milwaukee Brewers selected Ramirez in the fourth round, with the 131st overall selection, of the 2011 Major League Baseball draft as a first baseman. He split his first professional season between the rookie–level Helena Brewers and Single–A Wisconsin Timber Rattlers, batting a cumulative .271/.305/.496 with 11 home runs and 53 RBI. He returned to Wisconsin in 2012, playing in 96 games and hitting .248/.295/.447 with 16 home runs and 70 RBI. Ramirez spent the 2013 season with the High–A Brevard County Manatees, playing in 134 games and batting .258/.326/.438 with career–highs in home runs (19) and RBI (81). He was promoted to the Double–A in 2014, but repeated the level three times. In parts of six seasons in Double–A (with the Huntsville Stars and Biloxi Shuckers of the Double A Southern League), he batted .229/.324/.405 with 50 home runs and 198 RBI.

Through the 2017 season, Ramirez batted .242 with 96 home runs and 403 runs batted in, but he also struck out 748 times in 2,380 at bats. In 2017, the Brewers converted Ramirez into a pitcher. Returning to Biloxi, Ramirez had a 7–4 win–loss record in 48 relief appearances with a 1.38 earned run average (ERA) while holding opponents to a .199 batting average against. He earned a late-season promotion to the Triple–A Colorado Springs Sky Sox. Ramirez also made 32 plate appearances in 2017 as a first baseman or pinch hitter. He became a free agent after the season, but re-signed with Milwaukee on a minor league contract on January 10, 2018. In 2018, he had an 8–0 record with Biloxi in nineteen relief appearances, and held batters to just .159. However, he went 3–3 with Colorado Springs over twenty appearances, but finished with a 5.73 ERA while opponents hit .297 off him. Ramirez elected free agency following the season on November 2, 2018.

=== Detroit Tigers ===
On December 19, 2018, Ramirez signed a minor league contract with the Detroit Tigers. The Tigers promoted Ramirez to the major leagues for the first time on May 10, 2019. At time of promotion he had pitched in five games, three for Double-A Erie SeaWolves and two for Triple-A Toledo Mud Hens, starting all five. He held a 1–1 record, 2.31 ERA, and 30 strikeouts to only five walks.

On May 11, Ramirez made his major league debut against the Minnesota Twins, pitching four innings of relief in the second game of a doubleheader. He allowed one run on six hits, while striking out five batters, the first of which was Mitch Garver. Ramirez earned his first major league win with three perfect innings of relief in a May 29 game against the Baltimore Orioles. For the season, Ramirez went 5–4 with a 4.07 ERA and 74 strikeouts. He led all Tiger relievers with 79 2/3 innings out of the bullpen but was outrighted off the Tigers roster after the season ended. He was re-signed to a new minor league contract after becoming a free agent on November 7, 2019.

When the 2020 minor league season was cancelled because of the COVID-19 pandemic, Ramirez was assigned to the Tigers alternate training site. He was called up to the active roster on September 9. Ramirez appeared in five games, compiling a 0–0 record with 5.91 ERA and 11 strikeouts in 10 2/3 innings pitched. On October 27, he was outrighted off of the 40-man roster, and elected free agency.

=== San Diego Padres ===
On December 21, 2020, Ramirez signed a minor league contract with the San Diego Padres. On April 17, 2021, he was selected to the active roster to take the place of the injured Dan Altavilla. He made 13 appearances in 2021, going 1–1 with a 5.75 ERA and 14 strikeouts. Ramirez was designated for assignment by the Padres on September 17 and elected free agency on October 6.

=== Seattle Mariners ===
On April 9, 2022, Ramirez signed a minor league contract with the Seattle Mariners organization. He made 53 appearances for the Triple-A Tacoma Rainiers, logging a 3–4 record and 2.93 ERA with 53 strikeouts and 16 saves in 55 1/3 innings pitched and elected free agency following the season on November 10.

=== New York Yankees ===
On December 15, 2022, Ramirez signed a minor league contract with the New York Yankees organization. He began the 2023 season with the Triple-A Scranton/Wilkes-Barre RailRiders, making 8 appearances and registering a 1.74 ERA with 7 strikeouts in 10 1/3 innings of work. On April 25, he was selected to the Yankees active roster. In 32 relief appearances for them, he recorded a 2.66 ERA with 28 strikeouts across 40 2/3 innings pitched. Ramirez was optioned to Scranton to begin the 2024 season. However, he was designated for assignment by the Yankees on March 30, without appearing in any games.

=== Los Angeles Dodgers ===
On April 2, 2024, the Yankees traded Ramirez to the Los Angeles Dodgers in exchange for cash considerations. The Dodgers assigned him to the Triple–A Oklahoma City Baseball Club. After just one appearance in the minors, he was called up to the majors on April 13. He was designated for assignment on July 30, cleared waivers and was outrighted back to Oklahoma City on August 2. On September 8, Ramirez was added back to the major league roster, where he pitched in one more game before he was again designated for assignment on September 10. Ramirez cleared waivers and was again outrighted to Oklahoma City on September 12. On the season, he appeared in eight games for Los Angeles, with nine earned runs allowed in 31 innings and in 28 games in Oklahoma City, he posted a 4.37 ERA with 28 strikeouts across 35 innings. Ramirez elected free agency on October 31.

=== Tecolotes de los Dos Laredos ===
On May 12, 2025, Ramirez signed with the Tecolotes de los Dos Laredos of the Mexican League. In 37 relief appearances, he posted a 3–1 record with a 4.60 ERA, 31 strikeouts, and seven saves across 31 1/3 innings. On April 14, 2026, Ramirez was released by the Tecolotes.

=== Algodoneros de Unión Laguna ===
On April 27, 2026, Ramirez signed with the Algodoneros de Unión Laguna of the Mexican League. In five relief appearances for Laguna, he struggled to a 10.80 ERA in 3 1/3 innings of work. On May 13, Ramirez was released by the Algodoneros.

== Personal life ==
Ramirez and his wife, Tiffany, were married in 2018. They share a son, Reese, and daughter, Cru. His father, Randy, pitched for Long Beach State University and the Seattle Mariners organization, reaching Double-A.
