= Ronny Rodríguez =

Dominican baseball player (born 1992)

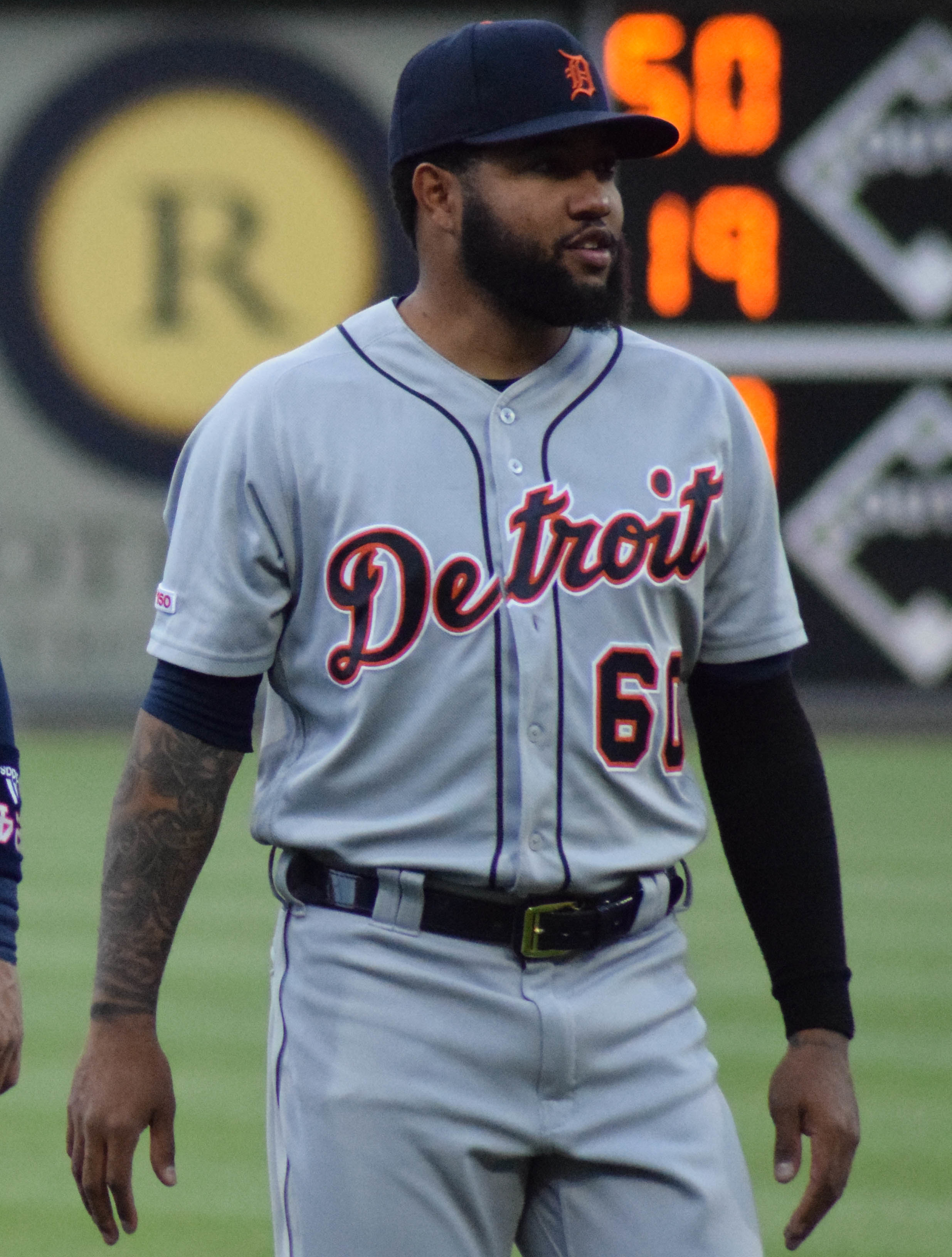
- Rodriguez with the Tigers in 2019

Free agent
- Infielder
- Born: April 17, 1992 (age 34); Santiago de los Caballeros, Dominican Republic
- Bats: Right Throws: Right

Professional debut
- MLB: May 31, 2018, for the Detroit Tigers
- NPB: April 22, 2021, for the Hokkaido Nippon-Ham Fighters
- CPBL: April 29, 2022, for the Wei Chuan Dragons

MLB statistics (through 2019 season)
- Batting average: .221
- Home runs: 19
- Runs batted in: 63

NPB statistics (through 2021 season)
- Batting average: .197
- Home runs: 6
- Runs batted in: 12

CPBL statistics (through 2022 season)
- Batting average: .273
- Home runs: 0
- Runs batted in: 5
- Stats at Baseball Reference

Teams
- Detroit Tigers (2018–2019); Hokkaido Nippon-Ham Fighters (2021); Wei Chuan Dragons (2022)

Ronny Rodríguez Martinez (born April 17, 1992) is a Dominican professional baseball infielder who is a free agent. He has previously played in Major League Baseball (MLB) for the Detroit Tigers, in Nippon Professional Baseball (NPB) for the Hokkaido Nippon-Ham Fighters, and in the Chinese Professional Baseball League (CPBL) for the Wei Chuan Dragons. Rodríguez has also played for the Dominican Republic national baseball team.

== Career ==
Rodríguez grew up in the Dominican Republic, but moved to the United States in 2007. He attended high school in Lawrence, Massachusetts, but when his mother became pregnant, putting a strain on the family due to their small house, he dropped out and returned to the Dominican Republic. He signed as an international free agent with the Chicago Cubs in 2008, but the contract was voided when Major League Baseball (MLB) determined he should have been eligible for the MLB draft. MLB suspended Rodríguez for a year. He began working out at the Kansas City Royals complex, but they decreased the signing bonus they were offering Rodríguez, and he did not sign with them.

=== Cleveland Indians ===
The Cleveland Indians signed Rodríguez as an international free agent in 2010.

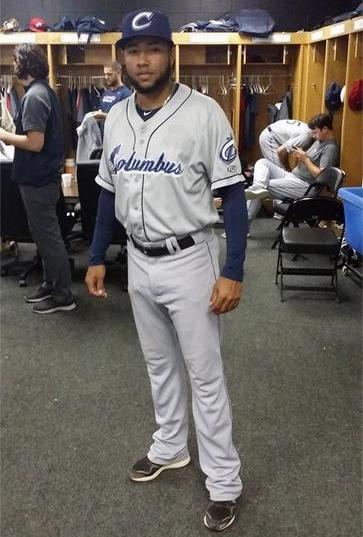
Rodríguez with the Columbus Clippers

In 2012, Rodríguez played for the Carolina Mudcats of the High–A Carolina League. He and Tony Wolters alternated between playing shortstop and second base. He led the team with 19 home runs, and was assigned to the Scottsdale Scorpions of the Arizona Fall League after the regular season. He played for the Akron RubberDucks of the Double–A Eastern League in 2013 and 2014. Rodríguez endured a wrist injury during spring training in 2015, and rejoined RubberDucks in June. During the winters, Rodríguez plays for Águilas Cibaeñas of the Dominican Professional Baseball League.

After the 2015 season, Rodríguez was selected to the roster for the Dominican Republic national baseball team at the 2015 WBSC Premier12. He batted 6-for-15 (.400) during the tournament.

During spring training in 2017, Rodríguez competed for a role on the Cleveland Indians' Opening Day roster. He did not make the team. Rodríguez spent the 2017 season with the Columbus Clippers of the Triple–A International League, and batted .291 with 17 home runs. He became a free agent after the season on November 6, 2017.

=== Detroit Tigers ===
On December 16, 2017, Rodríguez signed a minor league contract with the Detroit Tigers. He began the season with the Toledo Mud Hens of the International League. On May 30, he hit for the cycle. Rodríguez was named the International League's Player of the Month for May 2018, after he led the league with a .383 batting average, .652 slugging percentage, 44 hits, and 24 runs batted in during the month.

On May 31, 2018, the Tigers purchased Rodríguez's contract from the Mud Hens. He had batted .318 with eight home runs in 48 games for Toledo to that point. Rodríguez made his major league debut that day against the Los Angeles Angels as Detroit's second baseman. He hit an infield single off Andrew Heaney in his first major league at bat. Rodríguez batted 2-for-19 (.105) with six strikeouts for the Tigers before they optioned him to Toledo on June 6. He was recalled on July 5. On August 23, Rodríguez hit his first major league home run off James Shields of the Chicago White Sox. Rodríguez compiled 191 at-bats at the major league level in 2018, posting a .220 batting average with five home runs.

In 2019, Rodríguez was optioned to Toledo to open the season. The Tigers promoted him to the major leagues on April 14. In a May 11 game against the Minnesota Twins, Rodríguez hit a pair of upper-deck home runs for his first career multi-homer game. On August 23, also against the Twins, Rodríguez hit his first career grand slam. Rodríguez finished the 2019 season with a .221 average, 14 home runs, and 43 RBI in 276 major league at-bats.

=== Milwaukee Brewers ===
On December 9, 2019, Rodríguez was claimed off waivers by the Milwaukee Brewers from Detroit. On September 14, 2020, Rodríguez was designated for assignment by the Brewers without appearing in a major league game for them. He became a free agent on November 2.

=== Hokkaido Nippon-Ham Fighters ===
On November 27, 2020, Rodríguez signed with the Hokkaido Nippon-Ham Fighters of Nippon Professional Baseball. On April 22, 2021, Rodríguez made his NPB debut. Rodríguez played in 50 games, hitting .197 with 6 home runs and 12 RBI.

=== Wei Chuan Dragons ===
On January 20, 2022, Rodríguez signed with the Wei Chuan Dragons of the Chinese Professional Baseball League. He appeared in 12 games for Wei Chuan, hitting .273/.289/.341 with no home runs and five RBI. He was released on August 17.

=== Sultanes de Monterrey ===
On January 31, 2023, Rodríguez signed with the Sultanes de Monterrey of the Mexican League. In 29 games, he had a .273/.311/.500 slash line with 6 home runs and 18 RBI. He was waived on May 30.

=== Leones de Yucatán ===
On May 31, 2023, Rodríguez was claimed off waivers by the Leones de Yucatán of the Mexican League. In 10 games for Yucatán, he struggled to an .081/.081/.108 batting line with no home runs, four RBI, and one stolen base. Rodríguez became a free agent following the 2023 season. He subsequently played winter league baseball in Puerto Rico and the Dominican Republic during the 2023–24 offseason.

=== Piratas de Campeche ===
On October 12, 2023, Rodríguez signed with the Piratas de Campeche of the Mexican League. In 15 games for the Piratas, he batted .152/.220/.261 with one home run and three RBI. Rodríguez was released by Campeche on May 15, 2024.

=== Charleston Dirty Birds ===
On April 30, 2026, Rodríguez signed with the Charleston Dirty Birds of the Atlantic League of Professional Baseball. He was released by Charleston without making an appearance on May 12.

== Personal life ==
Rodríguez raps under the stage name "El Felino". His first music video was released during the 2017–18 offseason. His uncle, Wilton Chavez, was also a professional baseball player.
