= 2018 Seattle Mariners season =

2018 Seattle Mariners
- League: American League
- Division: West
- Ballpark: Safeco Field
- City: Seattle, Washington
- Record: 89–73 (.549)
- Divisional place: 3rd
- Owners: Baseball Club of Seattle, LP, represented by CEO John Stanton
- General manager: Jerry Dipoto
- Manager: Scott Servais
- Television: Root Sports Northwest (Dave Sims, Aaron Goldsmith, Mike Blowers)
- Radio: ESPN-710; Seattle Mariners Radio Network (Rick Rizzs, Aaron Goldsmith, Dave Sims)

The 2018 Seattle Mariners season was the 42nd season in franchise history. The Mariners played their 19th full season (20th overall) at Safeco Field, their home ballpark. After the Buffalo Bills of the NFL clinched a playoffs spot for the first time since 1999, The Mariners entered this season with the longest active playoff drought in the four major North American professional sports, failing to make their first postseason appearance since 2001. At several points in the season, the Mariners were 10 games ahead of the Oakland Athletics in the American League (AL) Wild Card race, but ended up finishing eight games behind them. The Mariners were eliminated from playoff contention on September 22 with the Athletics win against the Minnesota Twins. The Mariners began the season on March 29 against the Cleveland Indians and finished the season on September 30 against the Texas Rangers.

== Offseason and spring training ==
On December 7, 2017, the Mariners traded three minor leaguers to the Miami Marlins for Dee Gordon and $1 million in international slot money. General manager Jerry Dipoto stated he planned to use Gordon in center field instead of his usual second base.

On March 6, 2018, the Mariners signed free agent Ichiro Suzuki to a $750,000 contract salary with incentives up to $2 million. He returned to Seattle after five years with the New York Yankees and the Miami Marlins.

=== Other notable transactions ===
- November 15: Received Ryon Healy in a trade with the Oakland Athletics for Emilio Pagán and Alexander Campos.
- November 17: Hisashi Iwakuma re-signed on a minor league contract.
- December 17: Juan Nicasio signed a two-year, $17 million contract.

== Regular season ==
=== Standings ===
==== American League West ====
AL West
Team	W	L	Pct.	GB	Home	Road
Houston Astros	103	59	.636	—	46‍–‍35	57‍–‍24
Oakland Athletics	97	65	.599	6	50‍–‍31	47‍–‍34
Seattle Mariners	89	73	.549	14	45‍–‍36	44‍–‍37
Los Angeles Angels	80	82	.494	23	42‍–‍39	38‍–‍43
Texas Rangers	67	95	.414	36	34‍–‍47	33‍–‍48

==== American League Wild Card ====
Division leaders
Team	W	L	Pct.
Boston Red Sox	108	54	.667
Houston Astros	103	59	.636
Cleveland Indians	91	71	.562

Wild Card teams (Top 2 teams qualify for postseason)
Team	W	L	Pct.	GB
New York Yankees	100	62	.617	+3
Oakland Athletics	97	65	.599	—
Tampa Bay Rays	90	72	.556	7
Seattle Mariners	89	73	.549	8
Los Angeles Angels	80	82	.494	17
Minnesota Twins	78	84	.481	19
Toronto Blue Jays	73	89	.451	24
Texas Rangers	67	95	.414	30
Detroit Tigers	64	98	.395	33
Chicago White Sox	62	100	.383	35
Kansas City Royals	58	104	.358	39
Baltimore Orioles	47	115	.290	50

==== Record against opponents ====
2018 American League record Source: MLB Standings Grid – 2018
Team	BAL	BOS	CWS	CLE	DET	HOU	KC	LAA	MIN	NYY	OAK	SEA	TB	TEX	TOR	NL
Baltimore	—	3–16	3–4	2–5	2–4	1–6	2–4	1–5	1–6	7–12	1–5	1–6	8–11	3–4	5–14	7–13
Boston	16–3	—	3–4	3–4	4–2	3–4	5–1	6–0	4–3	10–9	2–4	4–3	11–8	6–1	15–4	16–4
Chicago	4–3	4–3	—	5–14	7–12	0–7	11–8	2–5	7–12	2–4	2–5	2–4	4–2	4–3	2–4	6–14
Cleveland	5–2	4–3	14–5	—	13–6	3–4	12–7	3–3	10–9	2–5	2–4	2–5	2–4	4–2	3–4	12–8
Detroit	4–2	2–4	12–7	6–13	—	1–5	8–11	3–4	7–12	3–4	0–7	3–4	2–4	3–4	4–3	6–14
Houston	6–1	4–3	7–0	4–3	5–1	—	5–1	13–6	4–2	2–5	12–7	9–10	3–4	12–7	4–2	13–7
Kansas City	4–2	1–5	8–11	7–12	11–8	1–5	—	1–6	10–9	2–5	2–5	1–5	0–7	2–5	2–5	6–14
Los Angeles	5–1	0–6	5–2	3–3	4–3	6–13	6–1	—	4–3	1–5	10–9	8–11	1–6	13–6	4–3	10–10
Minnesota	6–1	3–4	12–7	9–10	12–7	2–4	9–10	3–4	—	2–5	2–5	1–5	3–4	2–4	4–2	8–12
New York	12–7	9–10	4–2	5–2	4–3	5–2	5–2	5–1	5–2	—	3–3	5–1	10–9	4–3	13–6	11–9
Oakland	5–1	4–2	5–2	4–2	7–0	7–12	5–2	9–10	5–2	3–3	—	9–10	2–5	13–6	7–0	12–8
Seattle	6–1	3–4	4–2	5–2	4–3	10–9	5–1	11–8	5–1	1–5	10–9	—	6–1	10–9	3–4	6–14
Tampa Bay	11–8	8–11	2–4	4–2	4–2	4–3	7–0	6–1	4–3	9–10	5–2	1–6	—	5–1	13–6	7–13
Texas	4–3	1–6	3–4	2–4	4–3	7–12	5–2	6–13	4–2	3–4	6–13	9–10	1–5	—	3–3	9–11
Toronto	14–5	4–15	4–2	4–3	3–4	2–4	5–2	3–4	2–4	6–13	0–7	4–3	6–13	3–3	—	13–7

=== Season summary ===
Starter James Paxton threw a no-hitter on May 8 against the Toronto Blue Jays, becoming the first Canadian pitcher to throw an MLB no-hitter in Canada. Paxton shared the AL Player of the Week Award following his no-hitter and later won the Tip O'Neill Award, given to the best Canadian baseball player.

Closer Edwin Díaz set a franchise record with 57 saves, tied for second-most in an MLB season. He won the AL Reliever of the Year Award.

Catcher Mike Zunino was named to the Wilson All-Defensive Team.

Díaz, Nelson Cruz, Mitch Haniger, and Jean Segura were named to the All-Star Game, with Segura selected via the Final Vote.

The Mariners' payroll of $162.5 million ranked 9th in MLB.

==== Notable transactions ====
- April 23, 2018: Received Roenis Elías in a trade with the Boston Red Sox. The Mariners sent Eric Filia to Boston on June 12 to complete the trade. However, Filia failed a physical exam, and Seattle sent cash instead.
- May 3: Ichiro Suzuki released. He became the special assistant to the chairman.
- May 25: Traded Andrew Moore and Tommy Romero to the Tampa Bay Rays for Alex Colomé, Denard Span, and cash.
- June 4: Start of 2018 MLB draft. Notable signings include:
  - Logan Gilbert selected in the first round with the 14th overall selection. He signed for $3.883 million
  - Josh Stowers selected in the second round.
  - Cal Raleigh selected in the third round.
- June 6: Marc Rzepczynski released.
- July 2: Noelvi Marte and Jonatan Clase signed as international free agents.
- July 30: Received Adam Warren in a trade with the New York Yankees for international bonus slot money. The Mariners also traded Chase De Jong and Ryan Costello to the Minnesota Twins for Zach Duke and cash.

=== Game log ===
2018 game log: 89–73 (Home: 45–36; Away: 44–37)
March: 1–1 (Home: 1–1; Away: 0–0)

#	Date	Opponent	Score	Win	Loss	Save	Attendance	Record	Streak
1	March 29	Indians	2–1	**Hernández** (1–0)	Kluber (0–1)	**Díaz** (1)	47,149	1–0	W1
2	March 31	Indians	5–6	Carrasco (1–0)	**Paxton** (0–1)	Allen (1)	35,881	1–1	L1

April: 15–10 (Home: 4–4; Away: 11–6)

Date	Opponent	Score	Win	Loss	Save	Attendance	Record	Streak	
3	April 1	Indians	5–4	**Leake** (1–0)	Otero (0–1)	**Díaz** (2)	24,506	2–1	W1
4	April 3	@ Giants	6–4	**Gonzales** (1–0)	Blach (1–1)	**Díaz** (3)	40,901	3–1	W2
5	April 4	@ Giants	1–10	Cueto (1–0)	**Hernández** (1–1)	—	42,582	3–2	L1
6	April 5	@ Twins	2–4	Duke (1–0)	**Altavilla** (0–1)	Rodney (1)	39,214	3–3	L2
7	April 7	@ Twins	11–4	**Leake** (2–0)	Berríos (1–1)	—	18,416	4–3	W1
–	April 8	@ Twins	Postponed (inclement weather); Rescheduled for May 14th.						
8	April 9	@ Royals	0–10	Junis (2–0)	**Gonzales** (1–1)	—	12,324	4–4	L1
9	April 10	@ Royals	8–3	**Hernández** (2–1)	Skoglund (0–1)	—	14,850	5–4	W1
10	April 11	@ Royals	4–2	**Vincent** (1–0)	Grimm (0–1)	**Díaz** (4)	14,314	6–4	W2
11	April 13	A's	7–4	**Altavilla** (1–1)	Coulombe (0–1)	**Díaz** (5)	25,532	7–4	W3
12	April 14	A's	10–8	**Bradford** (1–0)	Graveman (0–3)	**Díaz** (6)	29,013	8–4	W4
13	April 15	A's	1–2	Manaea (2–2)	**Hernández** (2–2)	Treinen (3)	25,882	8–5	L1
14	April 16	Astros	2–1	**Paxton** (1–1)	Keuchel (0–3)	**Díaz** (7)	12,923	9–5	W1
15	April 17	Astros	1–4	McCullers Jr. (2–1)	**Altavilla** (1–2)	Devenski (2)	15,382	9–6	L1
16	April 18	Astros	1–7	Cole (2–0)	**Leake** (2–1)	—	14,643	9–7	L2
17	April 19	Astros	2–9	Morton (3–0)	**Gonzales** (1–2)	—	16,927	9–8	L3
18	April 20	@ Rangers	6–2	**Nicasio** (1–0)	Kela (2–1)	—	27,811	10–8	W1
19	April 21	@ Rangers	9–7	**Bradford** (2–0)	Claudio (0–1)	**Díaz** (8)	39,016	11–8	W2
20	April 22	@ Rangers	4–7	Pérez (2–2)	**Ramírez** (0–1)	Kela (3)	33,661	11–9	L1
21	April 23	@ White Sox	4–10	Fulmer (1–1)	**Leake** (2–2)	—	13,614	11–10	L2
22	April 24	@ White Sox	1–0	**Gonzales** (2–2)	Volstad (0–1)	**Díaz** (9)	10,761	12–10	W1
23	April 25	@ White Sox	4–3	**Hernández** (3–2)	Shields (1–3)	**Díaz** (10)	11,417	13–10	W2
24	April 26	@ Indians	5–4	**Altavilla** (2–2)	Goody (0–1)	**Díaz** (11)	12,133	14–10	W3
25	April 27	@ Indians	5–6	Kluber (4–1)	**Ramírez** (0–2)	—	16,355	14–11	L1
26	April 28	@ Indians	12–4	**Leake** (3–2)	Carrasco (4–1)	—	19,172	15–11	W1
27	April 29	@ Indians	10–4	**Gonzales** (3–2)	Tomlin (0–4)	—	17,878	16–11	W2

May: 18–11 (Home: 12–7; Away: 6–4)

#	Date	Opponent	Score	Win	Loss	Save	Attendance	Record	Streak
28	May 1	A's	6–3	**Hernández** (4–2)	Triggs (2–1)	**Díaz** (12)	12,468	17–11	W3
29	May 2	A's	2–3	Treinen (2–1)	**Díaz** (0–1)	–	11,603	17–12	L1
30	May 3	A's	4–1	**Bradford** (3–0)	Manaea (4–3)	**Díaz** (13)	12,888	18–12	W1
31	May 4	Angels	0–5	Richards (4–1)	**Leake** (3–3)	—	41,705	18–13	L1
32	May 5	Angels	9–8 (11)	**Goeddel** (1–0)	Johnson (2–1)	—	36,977	19–13	W1
33	May 6	Angels	2–8	Ohtani (3–1)	**Hernández** (4–3)	—	40,142	19–14	L1
34	May 8	@ Blue Jays	5–0	**Paxton** (2–1)	Stroman (0–5)	—	20,513	20–14	W1
35	May 9	@ Blue Jays	2–5	Tepera (3–1)	**Nicasio** (1–1)	Clippard (1)	20,290	20–15	L1
36	May 10	@ Blue Jays	9–3	**Leake** (4–3)	Happ (4–3)	—	22,315	21–15	W1
–	May 11	@ Tigers	Postponed (rain); Rescheduled for May 12th.						
37	May 12	@ Tigers	3–4	Boyd (2–3)	**Gonzales** (3–3)	Greene (8)	25,506	21–16	L1
38	May 12	@ Tigers	9–5	**Hernández** (5–3)	Fulmer (1–3)	—	25,506	22–16	W1
39	May 13	@ Tigers	4–5	Greene (2–2)	**Nicasio** (1–2)	—	24,718	22–17	L1
40	May 14	@ Twins	1–0	**Pazos** (1–0)	Hildenberger (1–1)	**Díaz** (14)	16,581	23–17	W1
41	May 15	Rangers	9–8 (11)	**Goeddel** (2–0)	Claudio (1–2)	—	14,670	24–17	W2
42	May 16	Rangers	1–5	Colón (2–1)	**Pazos** (1–1)	—	20,629	24–18	L1
43	May 17	Tigers	2–3	Saupold (2–1)	**Vincent** (1–1)	Greene (10)	15,169	24–19	L2
44	May 18	Tigers	5–4	**Altavilla** (3–2)	Farmer (0–2)	**Díaz** (15)	34,932	25–19	W1
45	May 19	Tigers	7–2	**Paxton** (3–1)	Fiers (4–3)	—	35,759	26–19	W2
46	May 20	Tigers	3–2 (11)	**Vincent** (2–1)	Farmer (0–3)	—	34,252	27–19	W3
47	May 22	@ A's	3–2 (10)	**Vincent** (3–1)	Petit (1–1)	**Díaz** (16)	9,408	28–19	W4
48	May 23	@ A's	1–0	**Gonzales** (4–3)	Gossett (0–2)	**Díaz** (17)	6,991	29–19	W5
49	May 24	@ A's	3–4	Petit (2–1)	**Hernández** (5–4)	Treinen (11)	12,633	29–20	L1
50	May 25	Twins	2–1	**Paxton** (4–1)	Romero (2–1)	**Díaz** (18)	19,924	30–20	W1
51	May 26	Twins	4–3 (12)	**Bradford** (4–0)	Magill (1–1)	—	23,986	31–20	W2
52	May 27	Twins	3–1	**Leake** (5–3)	Berríos (5–5)	**Colomé** (12)	31,340	32–20	W3
53	May 28	Rangers	2–1	**Gonzales** (5–3)	Fister (1–5)	**Díaz** (19)	26,236	33–20	W4
54	May 29	Rangers	5–9	Claudio (4–2)	**Díaz** (0–2)	—	13,259	33–21	L1
55	May 30	Rangers	6–7	Barnette (1–0)	**Rzepczynski** (0–1)	Kela (12)	13,070	33–22	L2
56	May 31	Rangers	6–1	**LeBlanc** (1–0)	Minor (4–4)	—	15,630	34–22	W1

June: 19–9 (Home: 10–2; Away: 9–7)

#	Date	Opponent	Score	Win	Loss	Save	Attendance	Record	Streak
57	June 1	Rays	4–3 (13)	**Elías** (1–0)	Andriese (1–3)	–	22,636	35–22	W2
58	June 2	Rays	3–1	**Gonzales** (6–3)	Archer (3–4)	**Díaz** (20)	28,599	36–22	W3
59	June 3	Rays	2–1	**Hernández** (6–4)	Alvarado (0–2)	**Díaz** (21)	26,567	37–22	W4
60	June 5	@ Astros	7–1	**Paxton** (5–1)	Keuchel (3–8)	—	35,646	38–22	W5
61	June 6	@ Astros	5–7	Devenski (2–1)	**Nicasio** (1–3)	Rondón (1)	30,361	38–23	L1
62	June 7	@ Rays	5–4	**Leake** (6–3)	Pruitt (1–3)	—	10,342	39–23	W1
63	June 8	@ Rays	4–3	**Gonzales** (7–3)	Font (0–3)	**Díaz** (22)	12,435	40–23	W2
64	June 9	@ Rays	3–7	Snell (8–3)	**Hernández** (6–5)	Roe (1)	12,528	40–24	L1
65	June 10	@ Rays	5–4	**Paxton** (6–1)	Alvarado (0–3)	**Díaz** (23)	10,512	41–24	W1
66	June 11	Angels	5–3	**LeBlanc** (2–0)	Heaney (3–5)	**Díaz** (24)	20,116	42–24	W2
67	June 12	Angels	6–3	**Leake** (7–3)	Barría (5–2)	**Díaz** (25)	20,402	43–24	W3
68	June 13	Angels	8–6	**Elías** (2–0)	Drake (1–1)	—	28,236	44–24	W4
69	June 14	Red Sox	1–2	Price (8–4)	**Hernández** (6–6)	Kimbrel (22)	30,479	44–25	L1
70	June 15	Red Sox	7–6	**Cook** (1–0)	Barnes (0–2)	**Díaz** (26)	44,459	45–25	W1
71	June 16	Red Sox	1–0	**LeBlanc** (3–0)	Wright (2–1)	**Díaz** (27)	44,151	46–25	W2
72	June 17	Red Sox	3–9	Rodríguez (9–1)	**Leake** (7–4)	—	46,462	46–26	L1
73	June 19	@ Yankees	2–7	Germán (2–4)	**Gonzales** (7–4)	—	45,122	46–27	L2
74	June 20	@ Yankees	5–7	Chapman (3–0)	**Cook** (1–1)	—	46,047	46–28	L3
75	June 21	@ Yankees	3–4	Severino (11–2)	**Paxton** (6–2)	Chapman (22)	46,658	46–29	L4
76	June 22	@ Red Sox	10–14	Barnes (1–2)	**Nicasio** (1–4)	—	37,342	46–30	L5
77	June 23	@ Red Sox	7–2	**Leake** (8–4)	Rodríguez (9–2)	—	36,051	47–30	W1
78	June 24	@ Red Sox	0–5	Sale (7–4)	**Gonzales** (7–5)	—	36,274	47–31	L1
79	June 25	@ Orioles	5–3	**Hernández** (7–6)	Castro (2–3)	**Díaz** (28)	21,102	48–31	W1
80	June 26	@ Orioles	3–2	**Paxton** (7–2)	O'Day (0–2)	**Díaz** (29)	16,327	49–31	W2
81	June 27	@ Orioles	8–7 (11)	**Bradford** (5–0)	Givens (0–5)	**Díaz** (30)	15,502	50–31	W3
82	June 28	@ Orioles	4–2 (10)	**Pazos** (2–1)	Castro (2–4)	**Nicasio** (1)	14,263	51–31	W4
83	June 29	Royals	4–1	**Gonzales** (8–5)	Kennedy (1–8)	—	25,558	52–31	W5
84	June 30	Royals	6–4	**Hernández** (8–6)	Hammel (2–10)	**Díaz** (31)	33,395	53–31	W6

July: 10–13 (Home: 8–6; Away: 2–7)

#	Date	Opponent	Score	Win	Loss	Save	Attendance	Record	Streak
85	July 1	Royals	1–0	**Paxton** (8–2)	Keller (2–3)	**Díaz** (32)	38,344	54–31	W7
86	July 3	Angels	4–1	**LeBlanc** (4–0)	Heaney (4–6)	**Díaz** (33)	38,624	55–31	W8
87	July 4	Angels	4–7	Richards (5–4)	**Leake** (8–5)	Parker (10)	39,518	55–32	L1
88	July 5	Angels	4–1	**Gonzales** (9–5)	Barría (5–6)	**Díaz** (34)	32,128	56–32	W1
89	July 6	Rockies	1–7	Márquez (7–8)	**Hernández** (8–7)	—	26,554	56–33	L1
90	July 7	Rockies	1–5	Oberg (2–0)	**Paxton** (8–3)	—	36,102	56–34	L2
91	July 8	Rockies	6–4	**LeBlanc** (5–0)	Senzatela (3–2)	**Díaz** (35)	34,440	57–34	W1
92	July 10	@ Angels	3–9	Ramirez (4–3)	**Leake** (8–6)	—	33,092	57–35	L1
93	July 11	@ Angels	3–0	**Gonzales** (10–5)	Barría (5–7)	**Díaz** (36)	35,591	58–35	W1
94	July 12	@ Angels	2–11	Skaggs (7–5)	**Paxton** (8–4)	—	44,027	58–36	L1
95	July 13	@ Rockies	7–10	Musgrave (1–3)	**Bergman** (0–1)	Davis (26)	38,126	58–37	L2
96	July 14	@ Rockies	1–4	Gray (8–7)	**LeBlanc** (5–1)	Davis (27)	47,789	58–38	L3
97	July 15	@ Rockies	3–4	Oberg (4–0)	**Vincent** (3–2)	—	35,630	58–39	L4
**89th All-Star Game in Washington, D.C.**
98	July 20	White Sox	3–1	**LeBlanc** (6–1)	Shields (4–11)	**Díaz** (37)	43,331	59–39	W1
99	July 21	White Sox	0–5	Covey (4–5)	**Hernández** (8–8)	—	38,186	59–40	L1
100	July 22	White Sox	8–2	**Gonzales** (11–5)	López (4–8)	—	38,207	60–40	W1
101	July 24	Giants	3–4	Watson (3–3)	**Díaz** (0–3)	Smith (4)	40,276	60–41	L1
102	July 25	Giants	3–2	**Colomé** (3–5)	Watson (3–4)	**Díaz** (38)	45,548	61–41	W1
103	July 27	@ Angels	3–4 (10)	Johnson (3–2)	**Nicasio** (1–5)	—	42,336	61–42	L1
104	July 28	@ Angels	5–11	Barria (6–7)	**Hernández** (8–9)	—	43,325	61–43	L2
105	July 29	@ Angels	8–5	**Gonzales** (12–5)	Peña (1–2)	**Díaz** (39)	35,396	62–43	W1
106	July 30	Astros	2–0	**Paxton** (9–4)	Cole (10–3)	**Díaz** (40)	35,198	63–43	W2
107	July 31	Astros	2–5	Morton (12–2)	**Leake** (8–7)	Rondón (10)	28,478	63–44	L1

August: 12–16 (Home: 3–8; Away: 9–8)

#	Date	Opponent	Score	Win	Loss	Save	Attendance	Record	Streak
108	August 1	Astros	3–8	Keuchel (9–9)	**LeBlanc** (6–2)	—	34,575	63–45	L2
109	August 2	Blue Jays	3–7	Hauschild (1–0)	**Nicasio** (1–6)	—	26,110	63–46	L3
110	August 3	Blue Jays	2–7	Borucki (1–2)	**Gonzales** (12–6)	—	30,715	63–47	L4
111	August 4	Blue Jays	1–5	Estrada (5–8)	**Paxton** (9–5)	—	41,238	63–48	L5
112	August 5	Blue Jays	6–3	**Duke** (4–4)	Biagini (1–6)	**Díaz** (41)	40,515	64–48	W1
113	August 6	@ Rangers	4–3 (12)	**Tuivailala** (4–3)	Butler (2–2)	**Díaz** (42)	17,759	65–48	W2
114	August 7	@ Rangers	4–11	Colón (6–10)	**Hernández** (8–10)	—	17,575	65–49	L1
115	August 8	@ Rangers	7–11	Gallardo (7–1)	**Gonzales** (12–7)	—	20,116	65–50	L2
116	August 9	@ Astros	8–6	**Paxton** (10–5)	Verlander (11–7)	**Díaz** (43)	34,976	66–50	W1
117	August 10	@ Astros	5–2	**Warren** (1–1)	Cole (10–5)	**Díaz** (44)	41,236	67–50	W2
118	August 11	@ Astros	3–2	**LeBlanc** (7–2)	Morton (12–3)	**Díaz** (45)	38,888	68–50	W3
119	August 12	@ Astros	4–3 (10)	**Duke** (5–4)	Osuna (1–1)	**Díaz** (46)	40,048	69–50	W4
120	August 13	@ A's	6–7	Manaea (11–8)	**Gonzales** (12–8)	Treinen (31)	10,400	69–51	L1
121	August 14	@ A's	2–3	Fiers (8–6)	**Hernández** (8–11)	Treinen (32)	17,419	69–52	L2
122	August 15	@ A's	2–0 (12)	**Pazos** (3–1)	Petit (5–3)	**Díaz** (47)	17,078	70–52	W1
123	August 17	Dodgers	1–11	Buehler (6–4)	**LeBlanc** (7–3)	—	46,796	70–53	L1
124	August 18	Dodgers	5–4 (10)	**Warren** (2–1)	Ferguson (3–2)	—	43,264	71–53	W1
125	August 19	Dodgers	1–12	Kershaw (6–5)	**Elías** (2–1)	—	45,519	71–54	L1
126	August 20	Astros	7–4	**Colomé** (4–5)	McHugh (5–2)	**Díaz** (48)	27,072	72–54	W1
127	August 21	Astros	2–3	Valdez (1–0)	**Detwiler** (0–1)	Rondón (14)	25,415	72–55	L1
128	August 22	Astros	7–10	Morton (13–3)	**Gonzales** (12–9)	Osuna (10)	31,076	72–56	L2
129	August 24	@ Diamondbacks	6–3	**Ramírez** (1–2)	Godley (13–7)	**Díaz** (49)	43,867	73–56	W1
130	August 25	@ Diamondbacks	4–3 (10)	**Colomé** (5–5)	Diekman (1–2)	**Díaz** (50)	34,968	74–56	W2
131	August 26	@ Diamondbacks	2–5	Greinke (13–8)	**Leake** (8–8)	Boxberger (29)	37,175	74–57	L1
132	August 28	@ Padres	1–2	Nix (2–2)	**Hernández** (8–12)	Yates (6)	25,168	74–58	L2
133	August 29	@ Padres	3–8	Lucchesi (7–7)	**Ramírez** (1–3)	—	20,266	74–59	L3
134	August 30	@ A's	7–1	**LeBlanc** (8–3)	Montas (5–4)	—	10,044	75–59	W1
135	August 31	@ A's	5–7	Petit (6–3)	**Leake** (8–9)	Treinen (34)	17,942	75–60	L1

September: 14–13 (Home: 7–8; Away: 7–5)

#	Date	Opponent	Score	Win	Loss	Save	Attendance	Record	Streak
136	September 1	@ A's	8–7	**Paxton** (11–5)	Hendricks (0–1)	**Díaz** (51)	28,760	76–60	W1
137	September 2	@ A's	2–8	Jackson (5–3)	**Hernández** (8–13)	Treinen (35)	21,496	76–61	L1
138	September 3	Orioles	2–1	**Ramírez** (2–3)	Rogers (1–1)	**Díaz** (52)	20,579	77–61	W1
139	September 4	Orioles	3–5	Cobb (5–15)	**Warren** (2–2)	Givens (6)	11,265	77–62	L1
140	September 5	Orioles	5–2	**Leake** (9–9)	Cashner (4–14)	**Díaz** (53)	15,017	78–62	W1
141	September 7	Yankees	0–4	Tanaka (11–5)	**Paxton** (11–6)	—	32,195	78–63	L1
142	September 8	Yankees	2–4	Lynn (9–10)	**Vincent** (3–3)	Betances (3)	38,733	78–64	L2
143	September 9	Yankees	3–2	**Colomé** (6–5)	Betances (4–5)	**Díaz** (54)	34,917	79–64	W1
144	September 11	Padres	1–2	Stammen (8–2)	**Díaz** (0–4)	Yates (8)	13,388	79–65	L1
145	September 12	Padres	4–5	Lucchesi (8–8)	**LeBlanc** (8–4)	Yates (9)	17,164	79–66	L2
146	September 13	@ Angels	8–2	**Leake** (10–9)	Despaigne (2–3)	—	33,328	80–66	W1
147	September 14	@ Angels	5–0	**Warren** (3–2)	Shoemaker (2–1)	—	39,872	81–66	W2
148	September 15	@ Angels	6–5	**Pazos** (4–1)	Álvarez (5–4)	**Díaz** (55)	42,292	82–66	W3
149	September 16	@ Angels	3–4	Cole (2–2)	**Vincent** (3–4)	Buttrey (3)	35,578	82–67	L1
150	September 17	@ Astros	4–1	**Cook** (2–1)	Rondón (2–5)	**Díaz** (56)	43,144	83–67	W1
151	September 18	@ Astros	0–7	James (1–0)	**Leake** (10–10)	—	35,715	83–68	L1
152	September 19	@ Astros	9–0	**Lawrence** (1–0)	Keuchel (11–11)	—	31,229	84–68	W1
153	September 21	@ Rangers	3–8 (7)	Jurado (4–5)	**Ramírez** (2–4)	—	29,420	84–69	L1
154	September 22	@ Rangers	13–0	**Gonzales** (13–9)	Minor (12–8)	—	31,158	85–69	W1
155	September 23	@ Rangers	1–6	Springs (1–1)	**LeBlanc** (8–5)	—	31,269	85–70	L1
156	September 24	A's	3–7	Buchter (5–0)	**Armstrong** (0–1)	—	16,491	85–71	L2
157	September 25	A's	10–8 (11)	**Colomé** (7–5)	Pagan (3–1)	—	12,791	86–71	W1
158	September 26	A's	3–9	Buchter (6–0)	**Hernández** (8–14)	—	13,727	86–72	L1
159	September 27	Rangers	0–2	Jurado (5–5)	**Duke** (5–5)	Leclerc (12)	15,799	86–73	L2
160	September 28	Rangers	12–6	**LeBlanc** (9–5)	Pérez (2–7)	—	23,598	87–73	W1
161	September 29	Rangers	4–1	**Vincent** (4–4)	Sampson (0–3)	**Díaz** (57)	31,780	88–73	W2
162	September 30	Rangers	3–1	**Elías** (3–1)	Gallardo (8–8)	**Armstrong** (1)	21,146	89–73	W3

Legend: = Win = Loss = Postponement
Bold = Mariners team member

== Roster ==
2018 Seattle Mariners
Roster
Pitchers: 53 Dan Altavilla; 37 Shawn Armstrong; 56 Christian Bergman; 60 Chasen Bradford; 48 Álex Colomé; 46 Ryan Cook; 45 Ross Detwiler; 39 Edwin Díaz; 33 Zach Duke; 55 Roenis Elías; 67 Matt Festa; 62 Erik Goeddel; 32 Marco Gonzales; 57 Justin Grimm; 34 Félix Hernández; 61 Casey Lawrence; 8 Mike Leake; 49 Wade LeBlanc; 37 Ariel Miranda; 64 Mike Morin; 12 Juan Nicasio; 65 James Paxton; 47 James Pazos; 31 Erasmo Ramírez; 52 Nick Rumbelow; 25 Marc Rzepczynski; 62 Sam Tuivailala; 50 Nick Vincent; 43 Adam Warren; 63 Robert Whalen	Catchers: 36 David Freitas; 26 Chris Herrmann; 10 Mike Marjama; 3 Mike Zunino; Infielders: 1 Gordon Beckham; 22 Robinson Canó; 9 Dee Gordon; 27 Ryon Healy; 21 Taylor Motter; 45 Kristopher Negrón; 7 Andrew Romine; 15 Kyle Seager; 2 Jean Segura; 6 Zach Vincej; 20 Dan Vogelbach	Outfielders: 57 John Andreoli; 23 Nelson Cruz; 16 Ben Gamel; 17 Mitch Haniger; 5 Guillermo Heredia; 10 Cameron Maybin; 4 Denard Span; 51 Ichiro Suzuki	Manager: 29 Scott Servais; Coaches: 14 Manny Acta (bench); 66 Fleming Baez (bullpen catcher); 28 Scott Brosius (third base); 38 Jim Brower (assistant coach); 40 Brian DeLunas (bullpen); 11 Edgar Martínez (hitting); 13 Chris Prieto (first base); 30 Mel Stottlemyre Jr. (pitching)

=== MLB debuts ===
- John Andreoli (May 23)
- Matt Festa (July 14)

== Statistics ==
=== Batting ===
Players in bold finished the season on the active roster.

Note: G = Games played; AB = At bats; R = Runs; H = Hits; 2B = Doubles; 3B = Triples; HR = Home runs; RBI = Runs batted in; SB = Stolen bases; BB = Walks; K = Strikeouts; Avg. = Batting average; OBP = On-base percentage; SLG = Slugging percentage;

Player	G	AB	R	H	2B	3B	HR	RBI	SB	BB	K	AVG	OBP	SLG	TB
John Andreoli	3	5	0	1	0	0	0	0	0	1	2	.200	.333	.200	1
**Gordon Beckham**	22	44	3	8	1	0	0	1	1	4	11	.182	.250	.205	9
Christian Bergman	1	2	0	1	0	0	0	1	0	0	0	.500	.500	.500	1
**Robinson Canó**	80	310	44	94	22	0	10	50	0	32	47	.303	.374	.471	146
**Nelson Cruz**	144	519	70	133	18	1	37	97	1	55	122	.256	.342	.509	264
**Roenis Elías**	3	2	0	1	0	0	0	0	0	0	1	.500	.500	.500	1
**David Freitas**	36	93	9	20	6	0	1	5	0	8	25	.215	.277	.312	29
**Ben Gamel**	101	257	37	70	14	4	1	19	7	31	61	.272	.358	.370	95
**Marco Gonzales**	1	2	0	0	0	0	0	0	0	0	2	.000	.000	.000	0
**Dee Gordon**	141	556	62	149	17	8	4	36	30	9	80	.268	.288	.349	194
**Mitch Haniger**	157	596	90	170	38	4	26	93	8	70	148	.285	.366	.493	294
**Ryon Healy**	133	493	51	116	15	0	24	73	0	27	113	.235	.277	.412	203
**Guillermo Heredia**	125	292	29	69	14	1	5	19	2	32	52	.236	.318	.342	100
**Félix Hernández**	2	4	0	0	0	0	0	0	0	0	0	.000	.000	.000	0
**Chris Herrmann**	36	76	6	18	4	2	2	7	0	10	24	.237	.322	.421	32
**Mike Leake**	2	4	0	0	0	0	0	0	0	0	4	.000	.000	.000	0
**Wade LeBlanc**	3	3	0	1	0	0	0	0	0	0	2	.333	.333	.333	1
Mike Marjama	10	27	1	3	3	0	0	0	0	2	6	.111	.172	.222	6
**Cameron Maybin**	30	91	12	22	2	1	1	8	2	6	20	.242	.289	.319	29
Taylor Motter	7	15	2	4	0	0	1	1	0	2	5	.267	.353	.467	7
**Kristopher Negrón**	18	29	6	6	0	0	1	3	2	1	9	.207	.233	.310	9
**Erasmo Ramírez**	2	3	0	0	0	0	0	0	0	0	2	.000	.000	.000	0
**Andrew Romine**	72	119	15	25	2	1	0	2	1	7	39	.210	.260	.244	29
**Kyle Seager**	155	583	62	129	36	1	22	78	2	38	138	.221	.273	.312	233
**Jean Segura**	144	586	91	178	29	3	10	63	20	32	69	.304	.341	.415	243
**Denard Span**	94	294	36	80	15	6	7	30	3	23	55	.272	.329	.435	128
Ichiro Suzuki	15	44	5	9	0	0	0	0	0	3	7	.205	.255	.205	9
Zach Vincej	1	4	0	2	0	0	0	1	0	0	1	.500	.500	.500	2
**Daniel Vogelbach**	37	87	9	18	2	0	4	13	0	13	26	.207	.324	.368	32
**Mike Zunino**	113	373	37	75	18	0	20	44	0	24	150	.201	.259	.410	153
**Team totals**	**162**	**5513**	**677**	**1402**	**256**	**32**	**176**	**644**	**79**	**430**	**1221**	**.254**	**.314**	**.408**	**2250**

=== Pitching ===
Players in bold finished the season on the active roster.

Note: W = Wins; L = Losses; ERA = Earned run average; G = Games pitched; GS = Games started; SV = Saves; IP = Innings pitched; H = Hits allowed; R = Runs allowed; ER = Earned runs allowed; BB = Walks allowed; K = Strikeouts

Player	W	L	ERA	G	GS	SV	IP	H	R	ER	BB	K
Dan Altavilla	3	2	2.61	22	0	0	20 2/3	11	7	6	15	23
**Shawn Armstrong**	0	1	1.23	14	0	1	14 2/3	9	2	2	3	15
Christian Bergman	0	1	5.79	3	2	0	14	12	9	9	3	7
**Chasen Bradford**	5	0	3.69	46	0	0	53 2/3	55	23	22	14	38
**Álex Colomé**	5	0	2.53	47	0	1	46 1/3	35	14	13	13	49
**Ryan Cook**	2	1	5.29	19	0	0	17	15	10	10	7	23
Ross Detwiler	0	1	4.50	1	0	0	6	8	3	3	2	2
**Edwin Díaz**	0	4	1.96	73	0	57	73 1/3	41	17	16	17	124
**Zach Duke**	2	1	5.52	27	0	0	14 2/3	13	9	9	6	12
**Roenis Elías**	3	1	2.65	23	4	0	51	46	17	15	16	34
**Matt Festa**	0	0	2.16	8	1	0	8 1/3	13	2	2	2	4
Erik Goeddel	2	0	1.23	5	0	0	7 1/3	4	1	1	5	9
**Marco Gonzales**	13	9	4.00	29	29	0	166 2/3	172	76	74	32	145
**Justin Grimm**	0	0	1.93	5	0	0	4 2/3	2	1	1	0	3
**Félix Hernández**	8	14	5.55	29	28	0	155 2/3	159	107	96	59	125
**Casey Lawrence**	1	0	7.33	11	0	0	23 1/3	28	19	19	10	14
**Mike Leake**	10	10	4.36	31	31	0	185 2/3	207	98	90	34	119
**Wade LeBlanc**	9	5	3.72	32	27	0	162	151	74	67	40	130
Ariel Miranda	0	0	1.80	1	1	0	5	6	1	1	4	5
Mike Morin	0	0	6.75	3	0	0	4	6	3	3	1	6
Taylor Motter	0	0	9.00	1	0	0	1	1	1	1	1	1
Juan Nicasio	1	6	6.00	46	0	1	42	53	35	33	12	33
**James Paxton**	11	6	3.76	28	28	0	160 1/3	134	67	67	42	208
**James Pazos**	4	1	2.88	60	0	0	50	47	19	16	15	45
**Erasmo Ramírez**	2	4	6.50	10	10	0	45 2/3	52	35	33	12	33
**Andrew Romine**	0	0	15.00	3	0	0	3	5	5	5	2	0
**Nick Rumbelow**	0	0	6.11	13	0	0	17 2/3	19	12	12	6	12
Marc Rzepczynski	0	1	9.39	18	0	0	7 2/3	13	11	8	9	10
Sam Tuivailala	1	0	1.69	5	0	0	5 1/3	6	1	1	1	4
**Nick Vincent**	4	4	3.99	62	1	0	56 1/3	50	28	25	15	56
**Adam Warren**	3	1	3.74	23	0	0	21 2/3	22	9	9	8	15
Rob Whalen	0	0	0.00	1	0	0	4	1	0	0	1	0
**Team totals**	**89**	**73**	**4.13**	**162**	**162**	**60**	**1448 2/3**	**1396**	**711**	**664**	**400**	**1328**

== Farm system ==
Level	Team	League	Manager
AAA	Tacoma Rainiers	Pacific Coast League	Pat Listach
AA	Arkansas Travelers	Texas League	Daren Brown
A-Advanced	Modesto Nuts	California League	Mitch Canham
A	Clinton LumberKings	Midwest League	Denny Hocking
A-Short Season	Everett AquaSox	Northwest League	José Moreno
Rookie	AZL Mariners	Arizona League	Zac Livingston
Rookie	DSL Mariners	Dominican Summer League	Cesar Nicolas
