= Zach Vincej =

American baseball player and manager (born 1991)

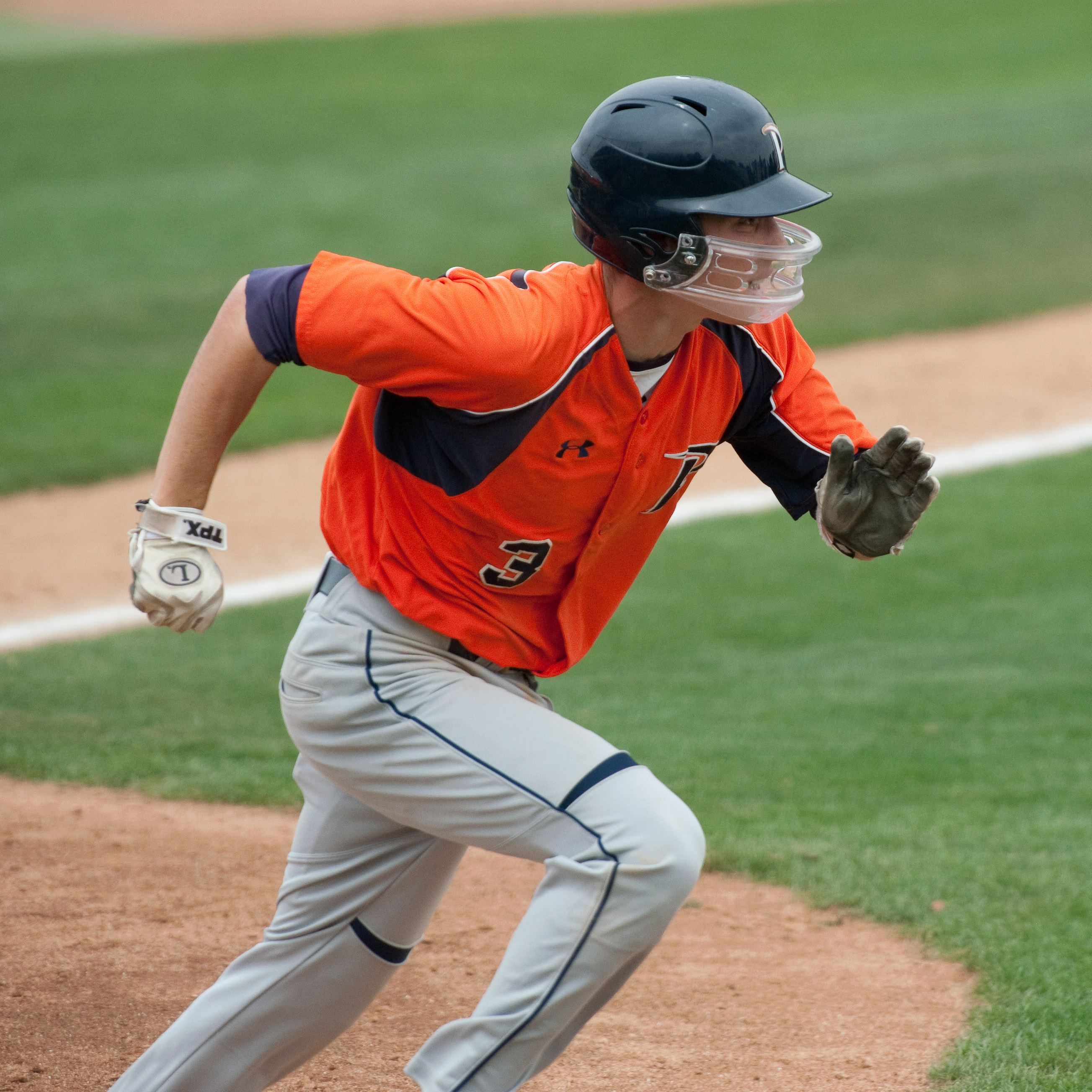
- Vincej with Pepperdine in 2010
- Shortstop / Coach
- Born: May 1, 1991 (age 35); San Diego, California, U.S.
- Batted: Right Threw: Right

MLB debut
- September 1, 2017, for the Cincinnati Reds

Last MLB appearance
- August 1, 2018, for the Seattle Mariners

MLB statistics
- Batting average: .231
- Home runs: 0
- Runs batted in: 1
- Stats at Baseball Reference

Teams
- Cincinnati Reds (2017); Seattle Mariners (2018)

Zachary Laine Vincej (/vinsiː/ VINCE-ee; born May 1, 1991) is an American former professional baseball shortstop and manager who is a minor league coach for the Seattle Mariners. He played in 9 Major League Baseball (MLB) games for the Cincinnati Reds in 2017 and one game for the 2018 Seattle Mariners. Before his professional career, Vincej played college baseball for the Pepperdine Waves, where he won the Brooks Wallace Award in 2012, given to the best collegiate shortstop. After retiring as a player, he became a coach and manager in the Mariners' minor league system, winning three consecutive league championships from 2023 to 2025.

== Amateur career ==
Vincej participated in PONY Baseball in the 14-and-under group. He also competed internationally for the United States national youth baseball team in 2007, winning the 2007 World Youth Baseball Championship. Vincej had a .583 batting average, batting 5-for-12 with 3 doubles and 1 triple, during the tournament.

Vincej attended Saugus High School in Santa Clarita, California and played for the school's baseball team as their starting shortstop. He was a second-team all-league selection as a freshman in 2006, and a first-team selection in his next three seasons. He was named to the all-state team after his sophomore season. He hit .369 with 4 home runs his senior season and was named to the All-Santa Clarita Valley team by The Signal.

Vincej enrolled at Pepperdine University, where he played college baseball for the Waves, starting in 2009. Vincej struggled in 2011, his sophomore season, batting .194 and committing 11 errors in 53 games played. However, he rebounded to hit .339 in 2012, winning the Brooks Wallace Award as the top college baseball shortstop in the nation. With the highest fielding percentage of all shortstops in the West Coast Conference at .981, Vincej was also named the conference's defensive player of the year.

Vincej played collegiate summer baseball for the Anchorage Bucs in the Alaska Baseball League in 2009 and 2010 and for the Hyannis Harbor Hawks of the Cape Cod Baseball League in 2011.

== Professional career ==
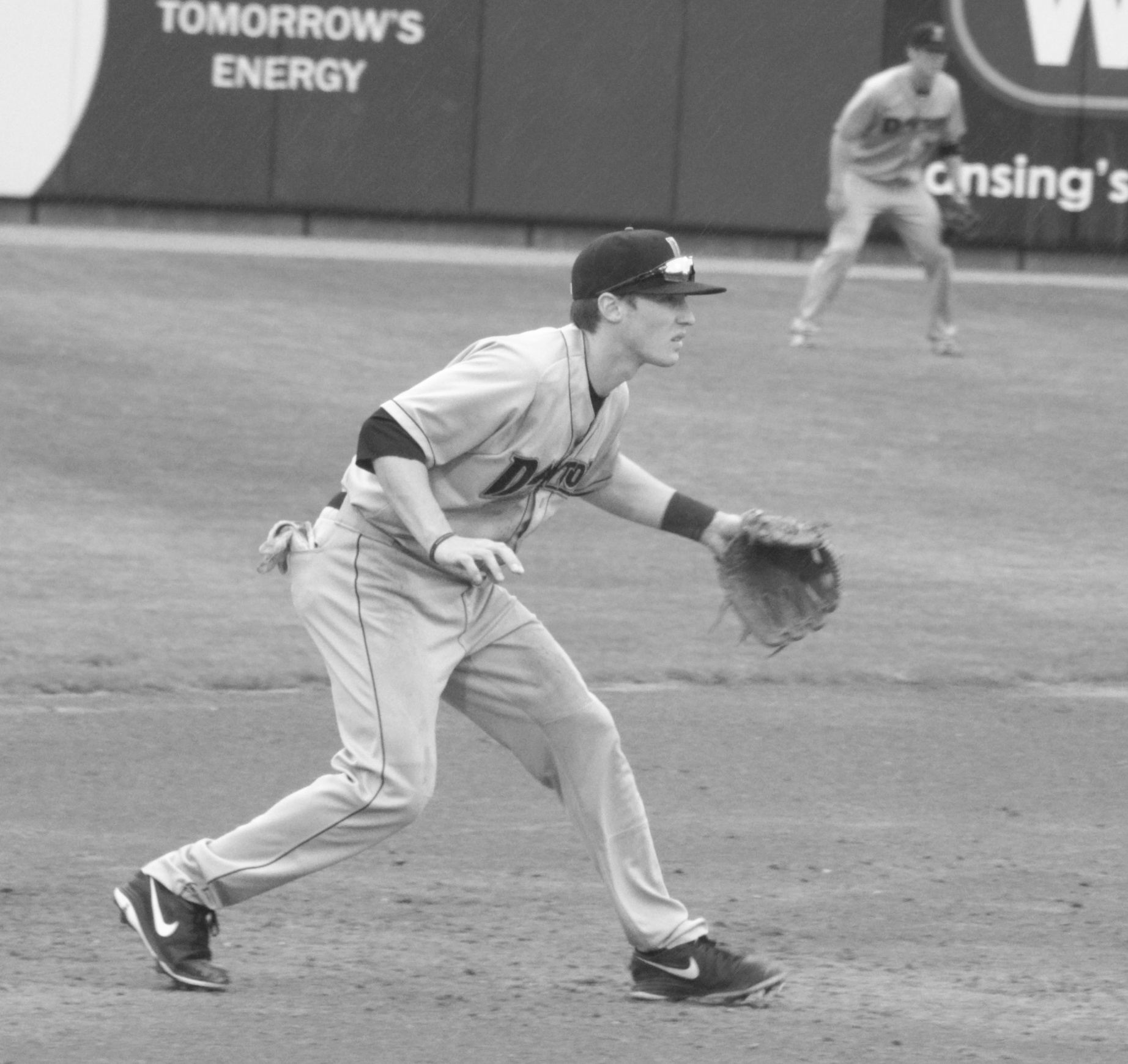
Vincej with Dayton in 2013

=== Cincinnati Reds ===
The Cincinnati Reds drafted Vincej in the 37th round of the 2012 Major League Baseball draft. He signed with the Reds and made his professional debut with the Billings Mustangs of the Rookie-level Pioneer League, slashing .336/.393/.434 with one home run and 17 RBIs in 38 games. Vincej played for the Single-A Dayton Dragons in 2013 and was named to the Midwest League's all-star game. In 104 games, he batted .263 with three home runs and 31 RBIs. Vincej played for the Bakersfield Blaze of the Class A-Advanced California League in 2014, posting a .271 batting average with one home run and 40 RBIs in 115 games, and the Pensacola Blue Wahoos of the Double-A Southern League in 2015, where he batted .241 with five home runs and 22 RBIs in 90 games. He returned to Pensacola in 2016, batting .281 with three home runs and 47 RBIs in 121 games. He won a minor league Gold Glove Award. After the 2016 regular season, Vincej played for the Peoria Javelinas of the Arizona Fall League.

Vincej began the 2017 season with the Louisville Bats of the Triple-A International League. There, he batted .270 with three home runs and 38 RBIs in 110 games. The Reds promoted Vincej to the major leagues on September 1. He made his MLB debut that night as a pinch hitter, grounding out to the shortstop. In nine games in the final month of the season, he batted 1-for-9 and was hit by two pitches.

=== Seattle Mariners ===
On November 3, 2017, the Seattle Mariners claimed Vincej off waivers. The Mariners outrighted Vincej to the Triple-A Tacoma Rainiers on November 7. Vincej was promoted to the major leagues on July 30, 2018. His only game with the Mariners was also the best and last MLB game. On August 1, he went 2-for-4 with 1 RBI in a Mariners loss. He was optioned back to Tacoma the next day. He was designated for assignment on August 21 and outrighted to Tacoma on August 24. He elected free agency on October 2.

=== Baltimore Orioles ===
On November 16, 2018, Vincej signed a minor league contract with the Baltimore Orioles. He spent the year with the Triple-A Norfolk Tides without receiving a call-up to the majors. In 101 games, Vincej batted .271/.317/.396 with 8 home runs and 51 RBI. He elected free agency following the season on November 4, 2019.

=== Seattle Mariners (second stint) ===
On June 3, 2021, Vincej signed a minor league contract with the Seattle Mariners and was added to the AZL Mariners' Development List. He did not play in a game and elected free agency following the season.

== Coaching career ==
On January 31, 2022, Vincej rejoined the Seattle Mariners as a coach for the Triple-A Tacoma Rainiers. He was later named a bench coach alongside former Tacoma teammate Seth Mejias-Brean. On April 20, he made his first appearance on a major league coaching staff, serving as the interim first base coach, while manager Scott Servais was unavailable after testing positive for COVID-19 and Kristopher Negrón served as interim manager. The Mariners beat the Texas Rangers that day under Negrón's management.

On January 26, 2023, the Mariners named Vincej the manager of the Single-A Modesto Nuts. The Nuts won the California League championship in 2023 and 2024. Baseball America named Vincej the minor league manager of the year in 2024. On January 15, 2025, the Mariners named Vincej the manager of the High-A Everett AquaSox. Vincej won his third straight championship as a manager, winning the Northwest League title despite having a losing record. It was Everett's first title since 2010. He became the Mariners' minor league defense and baserunning coordinator in 2026.

Vincej was a coach for the Croatia national team at the 2025 European Baseball Championships in Antwerp, Belgium and Rotterdam, the Netherlands, where the team finished 8th out of 12 teams. He coached alongside three fellow former Pepperdine players.

== Personal life ==
Vincej got engaged in September 2025. He has two siblings.

In college, Vincej said he grew up rooting for the San Diego Padres, that Dustin Pedroia was his favorite MLB player, and that Cal Ripken Jr. was his biggest sports hero.

Vincej earned his degree in public relations from Pepperdine in 2021.
