= Michael Plassmeyer =

American baseball player (born 1996)

Free agent
- Pitcher
- Born: November 5, 1996 (age 29); St. Louis, Missouri, U.S.
- Bats: Left Throws: Left

MLB debut
- August 23, 2022, for the Philadelphia Phillies

MLB statistics (through 2023 season)
- Win–loss record: 0–2
- Earned run average: 9.82
- Strikeouts: 11
- Stats at Baseball Reference

Teams
- Philadelphia Phillies (2022–2023)

Michael Gene Plassmeyer (born November 5, 1996) is an American professional baseball pitcher who is a free agent. He has previously played in Major League Baseball (MLB) for the Philadelphia Phillies.

== Amateur career ==
Plassmeyer attended De Smet Jesuit High School in Creve Coeur, Missouri. He then attended the University of Missouri, where he played college baseball for the Missouri Tigers. During his sophomore year, Plassmeyer was removed from the starting rotation and ended the year with a 4.83 earned run average (ERA) and 54 strikeouts. After the season, he trained with Brian DeLunas, increasing the velocity of his fastball and improving his grip on his curveball. As a junior at Missouri, he pitched to a 5–4 win–loss record with a 3.05 ERA, striking out 103 batters in 91 1/3 innings pitched.

== Professional career ==
=== Seattle Mariners ===
The Seattle Mariners selected Plassmeyer in the fourth round, with the 118th overall selection, of the 2018 Major League Baseball draft. He signed and was assigned to the Low–A Everett AquaSox, going 0–1 with a 2.25 ERA and 44 strikeouts in 24 innings pitched. He was a 2018 NWL mid-season All Star.

=== Tampa Bay Rays ===
On November 8, 2018, the Mariners traded Plassmeyer, Mike Zunino, and Guillermo Heredia to the Tampa Bay Rays in exchange for Mallex Smith and Jake Fraley. He began the 2019 season with the Single–A Bowling Green Hot Rods, for whom he was 2–1 with a 1.23 ERA. He was a 2019 MiLB organization All Star, and finished the year making appearances for the High–A Charlotte Stone Crabs and Triple–A Durham Bulls. In 25 total games (23 starts), he accumulated a 9–3 record and 1.91 ERA with 109 strikeouts in 132 innings of work. Plassmeyer did not play in a game in 2020 due to the cancellation of the minor league season because of the COVID-19 pandemic. He returned to action in 2021 for the Double–A Montgomery Biscuits, for whom he logged a 3.64 ERA across 7 contests.

=== San Francisco Giants ===
On June 11, 2021, the Rays traded Plassmeyer to the San Francisco Giants in exchange for pitcher Matt Wisler. Playing for the Triple–A Sacramento River Cats, Plassmeyer worked with pitching coach Garvin Alston to make mechanical adjustments to his pitching motion.

=== Philadelphia Phillies ===
The Giants traded Plassmeyer to the Philadelphia Phillies in exchange for Austin Wynns on June 8, 2022. Assigned to the Triple–A Lehigh Valley IronPigs, Plassmeyer continued working on his mechanical adjustments with IronPigs pitching coach Cesar Ramos.

The Phillies selected Plassmeyer's contract on August 22, 2022, and he was called up to the majors. On August 23 he made his debut, pitching 1 1/3 perfect innings, striking out Austin Romine on three pitches with the bases loaded.

Plassmeyer was optioned to Triple-A Lehigh Valley to begin the 2023 season. In 11 games (10 starts), he struggled to a 6.95 ERA with 47 strikeouts in 44 innings of work. On June 20, 2023, Plassmeyer was released by the Phillies. Plassmeyer re–signed with the Phillies on a minor league contract on June 23. On September 30, the Phillies selected Plassmeyer's contract, adding him back to the major league roster. That day he made his first MLB start against the New York Mets, surrendering 10 runs (9 earned) on 8 hits with 4 strikeouts across 3 2/3 innings pitched. Following the season on November 6, Plassmeyer was removed from the 40–man roster and sent outright to Triple–A Lehigh Valley. He elected free agency the same day.

=== Pittsburgh Pirates ===
On January 4, 2024, Plassmeyer signed a minor league contract with the Pittsburgh Pirates. In 28 games (11 starts) for the Triple–A Indianapolis Indians, he struggled to a 5–10 record and 7.93 ERA with 70 1/3 innings pitched. Plassmeyer elected free agency following the season on November 4.

=== Texas Rangers ===
On December 10, 2024, Plassmeyer signed a minor league contract with the Texas Rangers. He made 28 appearances (16 starts) for the Triple-A Round Rock Express in 2025, registering a 9-4 record and 4.43 ERA with 99 strikeouts across 105 2/3 innings pitched. Plassmeyer elected free agency following the season on November 6, 2025.

=== Toronto Blue Jays ===
On December 6, 2025, Plassmeyer signed a minor league contract with the Toronto Blue Jays. He began the 2026 season with the Triple-A Buffalo Bisons, posting a 3-1 record and 1.82 ERA with 23 strikeouts across 24 2/3 innings pitched. Plassmeyer was released by the Blue Jays organization on June 9, 2026.

=== Seattle Mariners (second stint) ===
On June 13, 2026, Plassmeyer signed a minor league contract with the Seattle Mariners. He made seven appearances (including four starts) for the Triple–A Tacoma Rainiers, struggling to an 0–3 record and 9.19 ERA with 15 strikeouts across 15 2/3 innings pitched. Plassmeyer was released by the Mariners organization on August 28.

== Personal life ==
Plassmeyer's father, Marty, and older brother, Mitch, both played college baseball as left-handed pitchers. Marty played for Nicholls State University and Mitch played for Bradley University. Mitch is currently the assistant pitching coach for the Baltimore Orioles.
