= Jake Fraley =

American baseball player (born 1995)

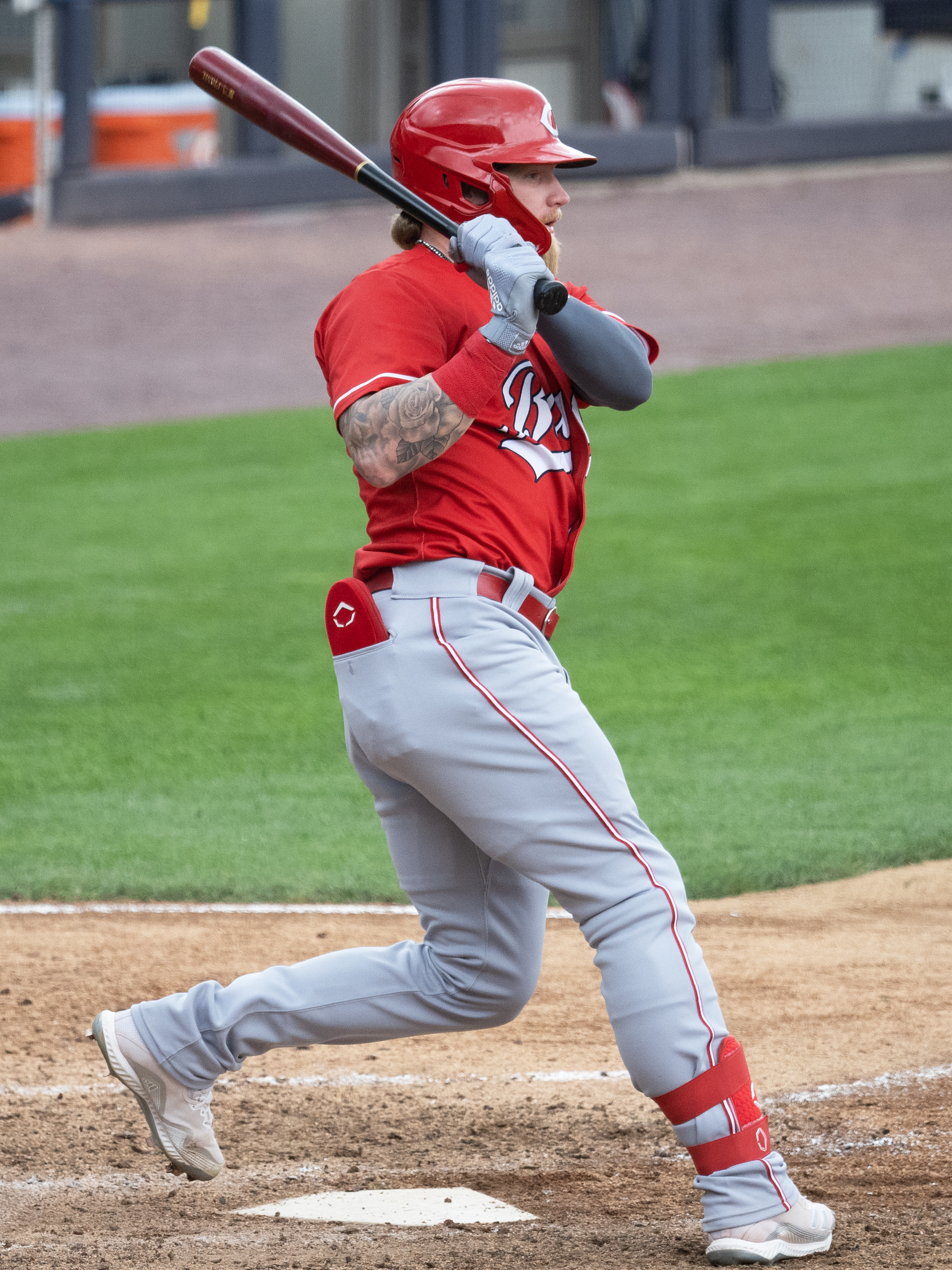
- Fraley with the Louisville Bats in 2022

Free agent
- Outfielder
- Born: May 25, 1995 (age 31); Frederick, Maryland, U.S.
- Bats: Left Throws: Left

MLB debut
- August 21, 2019, for the Seattle Mariners

MLB statistics (through 2026 season)
- Batting average: .246
- Home runs: 49
- Runs batted in: 184
- Stats at Baseball Reference

Teams
- Seattle Mariners (2019–2021); Cincinnati Reds (2022–2025); Atlanta Braves (2025); Tampa Bay Rays (2026)

Jake Arnold Fraley (born May 25, 1995) is an American professional baseball outfielder who is a free agent. He has previously played in Major League Baseball (MLB) for the Seattle Mariners, Cincinnati Reds, Atlanta Braves, and Tampa Bay Rays.

== Amateur career ==
Fraley attended Caravel Academy in Bear, Delaware, where he played for their baseball team. He batted .536 as a junior and .492 as a senior, and in his senior year was named to Louisville Slugger's All-American first team and the All-State first team.

Fraley enrolled at Louisiana State University (LSU) to play college baseball for the LSU Tigers. He batted .372 as a freshman in 2014, and was named a Freshman All-American by the National Collegiate Baseball Writers Association. He played collegiate summer baseball for the Chatham Anglers of the Cape Cod Baseball League after his freshman and sophomore years.

== Professional career ==
=== Tampa Bay Rays ===
The Tampa Bay Rays selected Fraley with the 77th overall selection of the 2016 MLB draft. He spent the 2016 season with the Low-A Hudson Valley Renegades where he batted .238 with one home run, 18 RBI and 33 stolen bases in 55 games. In 2017, Fraley played for the High-A Charlotte Stone Crabs, posting a .170 batting average with one home run and 12 RBI in only 26 games due to injury. In 2018, he returned to the Stone Crabs, batting .347/.415/.547 with four home runs, 41 RBI, and 11 stolen bases in 66 games.

In the subsequent offseason, Fraley played in the 2017–18 Australian Baseball League season for the Perth Heat batting .361/.449/.680 in 40 games, setting the runs (50) and stolen base (39) records.

=== Seattle Mariners ===
On November 8, 2018, Fraley was traded to the Seattle Mariners along with Mallex Smith for Mike Zunino, Guillermo Heredia, and Michael Plassmeyer. He began the 2019 season with the Arkansas Travelers of the Double-A Texas League. The Mariners promoted Fraley to the Tacoma Rainiers of the Triple-A Pacific Coast League on June 20.

On August 20, 2019, the Mariners selected Fraley's contract and promoted him to the major leagues. He made his major league debut on August 21 versus the Tampa Bay Rays. He batted .150 in 12 games. For the abbreviated 2020 season, Fraley appeared in seven games with the Mariners, getting four hits in 23 at-bats.

On June 6, 2021, Fraley hit his first career home run, a three-run shot off Griffin Canning of the Los Angeles Angels. In a June 9 matchup against the Detroit Tigers, Fraley made a leaping catch to rob rookie Isaac Paredes of a walk-off home run, instead sending the game to extras when a quick relay to first base allowed for an inning-ending double play. He notched a go-ahead single in the 11th inning to carry his team to a 9–6 victory. Fraley finished the 2021 season batting .210 with 9 home runs, 36 RBIs and 10 stolen bases in 78 games.

=== Cincinnati Reds ===
On March 14, 2022, the Mariners traded Fraley, Justin Dunn, Brandon Williamson, and a player to be named later (Connor Phillips) to the Cincinnati Reds in exchange for Eugenio Suárez and Jesse Winker. He would make 68 appearances for the team, batting .259/.344/.468 with 12 home runs, 28 RBI, and four stolen bases.

On May 1, 2023, Fraley was placed on the injured list with right knee inflammation, and was shifted to the 60-day injured list on June 13. He was activated on July 29. Fraley made 111 total appearances for the Reds, slashing .256/.339/.443 with 15 home runs, 65 RBI, and 21 stolen bases.

Fraley appeared in 116 contests for the Reds in 2024, hitting .277/.330/.386 with five home runs, 26 RBI, and 20 stolen bases. He made 67 appearances for Cincinnati in 2025, batting .232/.332/.387 with six home runs, 23 RBI, and four stolen bases. Fraley was designated for assignment by the Reds on August 17, 2025.

=== Atlanta Braves ===
On August 19, 2025, Fraley was claimed off waivers by the Atlanta Braves. In nine appearances for Atlanta, he went 7-for-23 (.304) with no home runs or RBI. On September 14, Fraley was placed on the injured list due to a strained right oblique muscle. He was transferred to the 60-day injured list on September 17, officially ending his season.

=== Tampa Bay Rays (second stint) ===
On November 6, 2025, Fraley was claimed off waivers by the Tampa Bay Rays. He was designated for assignment by the Rays on November 18, after multiple prospects were added to the 40-man roster. Fraley was non-tendered by the team on November 21, becoming a free agent. On November 25, Fraley re-signed with the Rays on a one-year contract. On May 18, 2026, it was announced that Fraley would require sports hernia surgery and miss 6-to-8 weeks as a result. He was transferred to the 60-day injured list on August 2. Fraley was activated on September 15. He made 31 total appearances for the Rays, slashing .216/.289/.364 with two home runs, five RBI, and three stolen bases. Fraley was designated for assignment by Tampa Bay on September 20. He elected free agency after clearing waivers on September 22.

== Personal life ==
Fraley was born in Frederick, Maryland on May 25, 1995. He is a Christian. He has an older sister, Lauren, and two younger brothers, Andrew, and Brandon and two younger sisters, Hallie and Megan Myers. His younger brother, Brandon, is also a baseball player who attended Caravel Academy. Fraley married Angelica Caceres on October 21, 2016, in Miami, Florida. They have two children. According to an Ancestry.com test, he is a descendant of Vikings and Anglo-Saxons people, which was a major reason as to why the Reds adopted a dugout celebration for the 2023 season involving a Viking outfit, also involving bullpen pitcher Luis Cessa telling him late in the 2022 season that he "looked like a Viking with the big beard and long blonde hair.".
