= Scott Servais =

American baseball player & manager (born 1967)

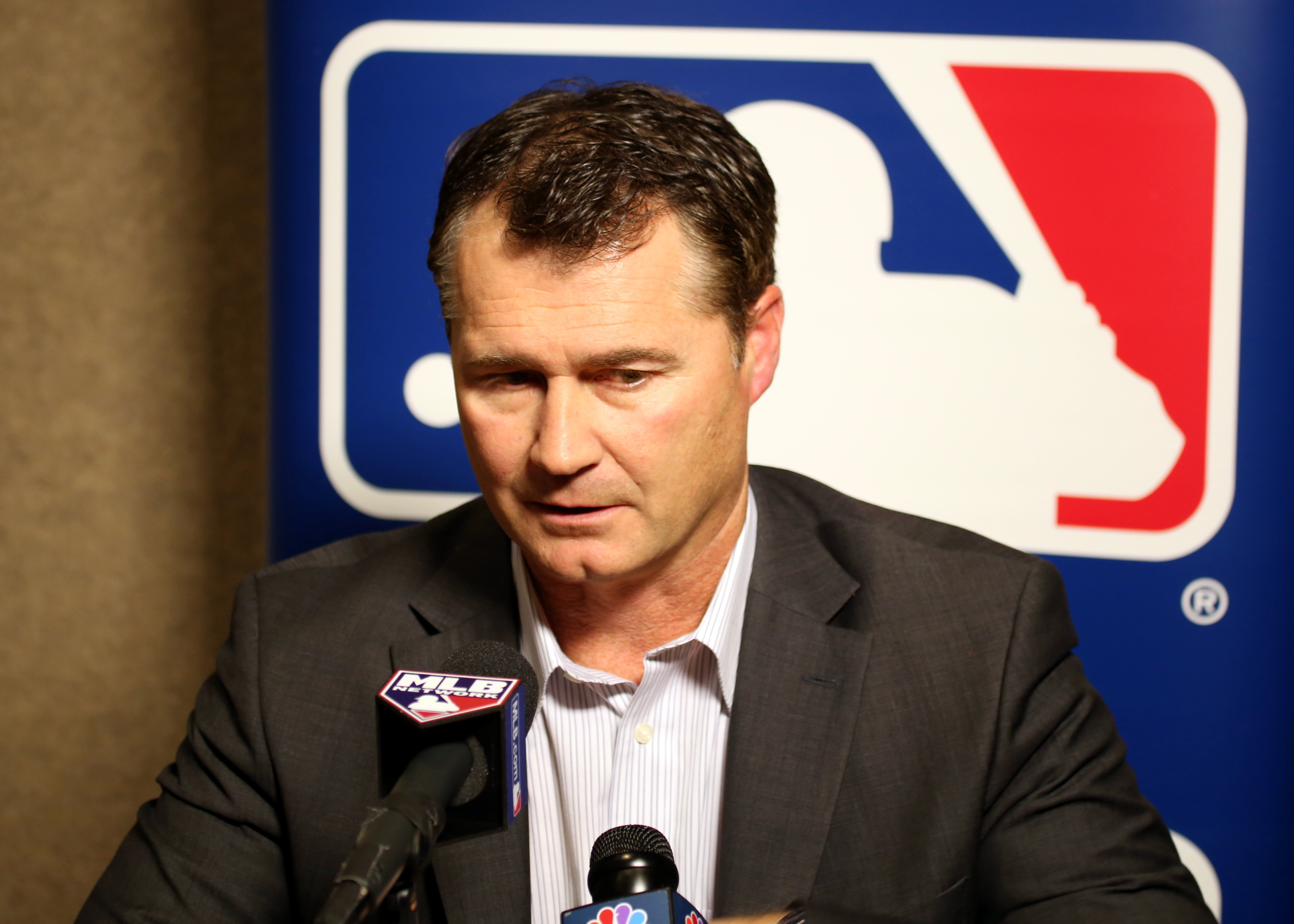
- Servais at the 2015 Winter Meetings

Colorado Rockies
- Catcher / Manager
- Born: June 4, 1967 (age 59); La Crosse, Wisconsin, U.S.
- Batted: Right Threw: Right

MLB debut
- July 12, 1991, for the Houston Astros

Last MLB appearance
- September 21, 2001, for the Houston Astros

MLB statistics
- Batting average: .245
- Home runs: 63
- Runs batted in: 319
- Managerial record: 680–642
- Winning %: .514
- Stats at Baseball Reference
- Managerial record at Baseball Reference

Teams
- As player: Houston Astros (1991–1995); Chicago Cubs (1995–1998); San Francisco Giants (1999); Colorado Rockies (2000); San Francisco Giants (2000); Houston Astros (2001); As manager: Seattle Mariners (2016–2024); As coach: Texas Rangers (2004–2010); San Diego Padres (2025–2026); As executive: Colorado Rockies (2027–present)
Medals
Men's baseball
Representing the United States
Olympic Games
Gold medal – first place	1988 Seoul	Team
Pan American Games
Silver medal – second place	1987 Indianapolis	Team
Baseball World Cup
Silver medal – second place	1988 Rome	Team
Intercontinental Cup
Silver medal – second place	1987 Havana	Team
World Junior Baseball Championship
Silver medal – second place	1985 Albany	Team

Scott Daniel Servais (/ˈsɜːrvɪs/ SUR-vis; born June 4, 1967) is an American professional baseball former manager, catcher, and current senior director of baseball operations for the Colorado Rockies of Major League Baseball (MLB). Servais was the manager of the Seattle Mariners of MLB from 2016 to 2024.

A catcher in MLB for 11 seasons, Servais was previously the assistant general manager for the Los Angeles Angels of Anaheim, the director of player development for the Texas Rangers, and an assistant development coach for the San Diego Padres. He played in the National League for the Houston Astros, Chicago Cubs, San Francisco Giants, and Colorado Rockies.

== Early years ==
A native of Coon Valley, Wisconsin, Servais played high school baseball for the Westby Norsemen and was selected in the second round of the 1985 amateur draft by the New York Mets but did not sign. He opted to attend Creighton University and played college baseball for the Creighton Bluejays. In 1986, he played collegiate summer baseball with the Orleans Cardinals of the Cape Cod Baseball League. After his junior season, Servais was selected in the third round of the 1988 MLB draft by the Houston Astros.

=== National teams ===
Servais was a member of the United States national baseball team while the team competed in the 1986 Amateur World Series. He then played in the 1987 Pan American Games, where they won the silver medal, and the 1987 Intercontinental Cup. Servais was also the backup catcher to Doug Robbins at the 1988 Olympics in Seoul, where the U.S. won the gold medal, although baseball was only a demonstration sport.

== Playing career ==
Servais began his major league career in 1991 with the Houston Astros, staying with them until the middle of the 1995 season when he was traded with Luis Gonzalez to the Chicago Cubs for Rick Wilkins. It was with the Cubs, during the 1998 season, that he played in his only postseason. After the Cubs lost to the Atlanta Braves in the National League Division Series as a wildcard team, he signed as a free agent with the San Francisco Giants.

Servais signed with the Colorado Rockies ahead of the 2000 season. After dealing with injuries, the Giants selected him off waivers in September. Prior to the 2001 season, he signed as a free agent with the Detroit Tigers but was released before the season began. He signed with Houston on March 28. Servais signed with San Francisco again prior to the 2002 season, but he did not make the opening day roster, making the 2001 season his final MLB season. He played in Triple-A for the Giants before being released on April 14. He signed with the Rockies two days later, finishing his playing career that year in Triple-A.

== Post-playing career ==
=== Texas Rangers and Los Angeles Angels of Anaheim ===
Servais served in the Texas Rangers' front office as the senior director of player development from 2004 until 2010. He was hired by Los Angeles Angels of Anaheim general manager Jerry Dipoto as assistant general manager in 2011. Dipoto and Servais are close friends, a relationship formed while playing together for the Colorado Rockies in 2000, when the pair had discussed Servais' dream of one day serving as a manager.

=== Seattle Mariners ===
==== 2016–2021 ====
When Dipoto resigned during the 2015 season, the Angels hired Billy Eppler. Dipoto was soon hired as the general manager of the Seattle Mariners on September 28, and manager Lloyd McClendon was fired on October 9, days after the season's conclusion. On October 23, Servais was hired as the Mariners' manager.

On June 26, 2016, Servais received his first ejection as a manager, asking home plate umpire Carlos Torres why he didn't ask the first or third base umpire to see if Shawn O'Malley went around on his swing or not. Servais finished his first season with a record of 86 wins and 76 losses.

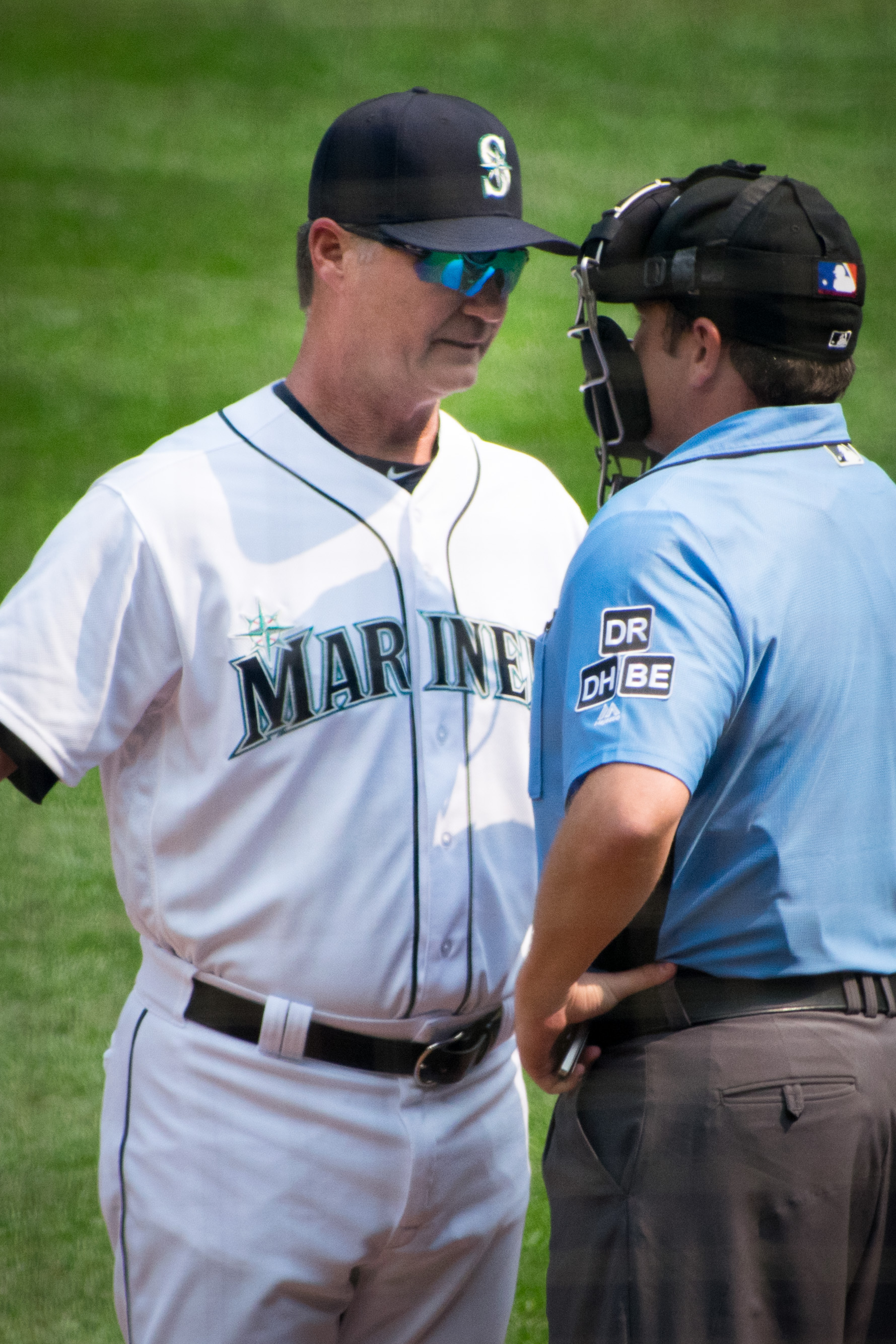
Servais (left) with umpire Jansen Visconti in 2018

Servais received his second ejection as a manager on April 16, 2017, after first base umpire C. B. Bucknor originally called Leonys Martín's grounder a foul ball and changed the ruling after Rangers first baseman Mike Napoli pleaded with Bucknor that it was a fair ball and Rangers manager Jeff Banister was on his way out to plead his case. On May 25, Servais received his third ejection of his managerial career on a questionable called third strike on Guillermo Heredia against the Washington Nationals. His second season concluded six games under .500, a record of 84 losses to 78 wins, third place in the American League (AL) West.

On July 20, 2018, Dipoto announced that Servais' contract would be extended for an undisclosed salary and number of years. This extension came when the 2018 Mariners were playing 58–39, the fourth-best record in the MLB. The team would falter after the All-Star break and finished the season in third place in the AL West, 14 games behind the first-place Houston Astros, and 8 games out of a wild card berth.

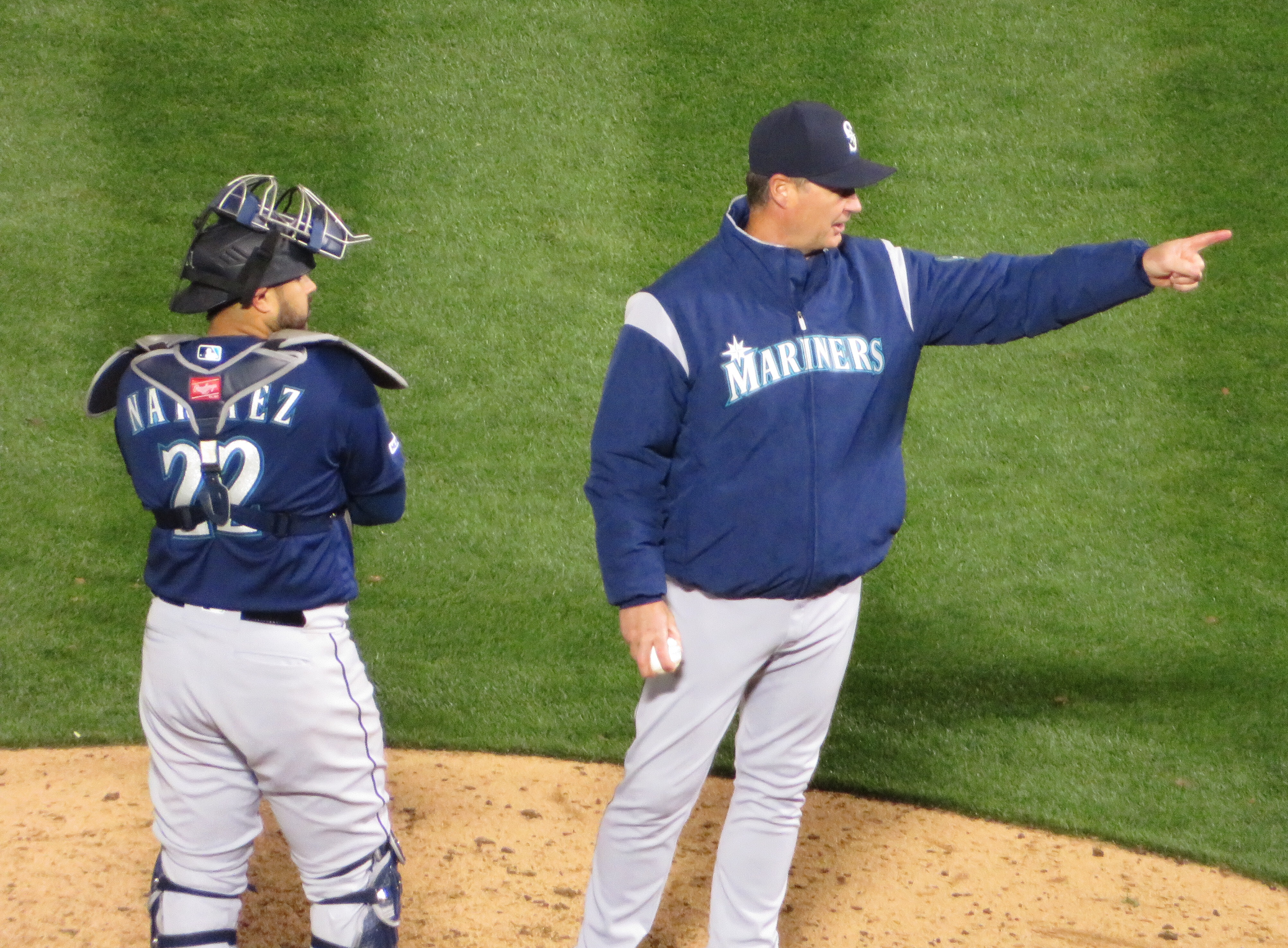
Servais (right) with Omar Narváez in 2019.

Following the 2018 season, Dipoto traded away many of the team's best players in order to rebuild toward the future. As a result, the 2019 Mariners finished 68–94 after a franchise-best 13–2 start. The shortened 2020 season had a better result at 27–33. Through the 2019 and 2020 season, rumors circulated about Servais' long-term career stability with the Mariners, although Dipoto and other front office staff voiced confidence in Servais.

In 2021, Servais led the Mariners to their best season since 2003, finishing with a 90–72 record and two games back in the AL Wild Card race. The Mariners won despite a run differential of -51, the worst ever for a team with at least 90 wins. Servais joked that the team had a positive "fun differential", which led Baseball Reference to add that fictional statistic to the team's page. On the final day of the season, needing a win to possibly force a tie for the Wild Card, the Mariners lost to the Angels. Servais placed second in voting for the AL Manager of the Year Award, behind Kevin Cash of the Tampa Bay Rays. On September 1, the Mariners announced that Servais had agreed to a multi-year extension with the club.

==== 2022–2024 ====
In 2022, Servais' Mariners had high expectations, but stumbled to a 29–39 record in the first 68 games of the season. However, the Mariners recovered and made the MLB playoffs as a wild card team. Servais became only the second manager in Mariners history to lead the team to the playoffs. The Mariners faced the Toronto Blue Jays in the AL Wild Card Series. They won the series in two games, clinching their first playoff series win in 21 years, with the team coming back from an 8–1 deficit in Game 2 after the fifth inning to win 10–9, tied for the second largest comeback in postseason history.

In the AL Division Series, they faced Houston, who had beaten them 12 out of 19 times in regular season. In Game 1, Seattle scored four runs in the first two innings and held the lead to 7–3 going into the eighth inning. However, the bullpen could not hold it, and the lead was only 7–5 going into the 9th; Paul Sewald allowed two baserunners (a hit by pitch and a single by Jeremy Peña) to reach while getting two outs. Servais elected to use Robbie Ray to face Yordan Alvarez to end the game. The move failed, as Alvarez launched Ray's second pitch into deep right field for a walk-off 8–7 win. Two days later, the Mariners held a 2–1 lead going into the 6th inning. Again, with two outs and Peña on base, Alvarez was at the plate, this time facing starter Luis Castillo. Alvarez hit a home run to left field to give Houston a 3–2 lead. In the 8th, Servais intentionally walked Alvarez to get to Alex Bregman with a runner on. Bregman lined a shot to right to make the final score 4–2. Two days later, the Mariners played their first home playoff game in 21 years. 18 innings later, they lost 1–0 on a Peña home run to finish their season. In total, Seattle was outscored 10–2 over the final 29 innings after leading 7–3 in the 8th inning of Game 1.

In 2023, the Mariners were leading the AL West on September 2 with a record of 77–58. They won just 11 of their last 27 games before being eliminated in the penultimate game of the season and finishing third place behind Houston and Texas, although they did finish with a winning season for their third straight year, the first such period for the team since the 2000–2003 teams.

The 2024 season showed promise, with the team leading the division by ten games on June 18. They proceeded to collapse in July and August, going from 13 games above .500 to at .500 while losing the division lead. The Mariners fired Servais on August 22, making him the first MLB manager to have a ten-game lead of a division/league and not finish the season.

In more than 8 seasons, Servais had a managerial record of 680–642 (.514). He ranks second in franchise history in wins, losses, and ejections behind Lou Piniella and is one of only three managers, along with his successor Dan Wilson and Piniella, to pilot Seattle to the playoffs.

=== San Diego Padres ===
On January 11, 2025, Servais was hired by the San Diego Padres as a special assistant for player development. He was considered for open manager jobs with the Minnesota Twins and Baltimore Orioles after the 2025 season but returned to the Padres in 2026.

=== Colorado Rockies ===
On November 22, 2026, Servais was hired by the Colorado Rockies as their senior director of baseball operations.

== Managerial record ==
As of August 22, 2024

Team	Year	Regular season					Postseason			
Team	Year	Games	Won	Lost	Win %	Finish	Won	Lost	Win %	Result
SEA	2016	162	86	76	.531	2nd in AL West	–	–	–	
SEA	2017	162	78	84	.481	3rd in AL West	–	–	–	
SEA	2018	162	89	73	.549	3rd in AL West	–	–	–	
SEA	2019	162	68	94	.420	5th in AL West	–	–	–	
SEA	2020	60	27	33	.450	3rd in AL West	–	–	–	
SEA	2021	162	90	72	.556	2nd in AL West	–	–	–	
SEA	2022	162	90	72	.556	2nd in AL West	2	3	.400	Lost ALDS (HOU)
SEA	2023	162	88	74	.543	3rd in AL West	–	–	–	
SEA	2024	128	64	64	.500	(fired)	–	–	–	
Total		1,322	680	642	.514		2	3	.400	

== Personal life ==
Servais is the nephew of former Creighton head baseball coach Ed Servais. He is married to his high school sweetheart. The couple has three children. Their son, Tyler, played college baseball at Princeton and was drafted by the Rockies in the 2011 MLB draft, then the Tigers in the 2015 MLB draft, playing in the minors in 2015. One of their daughters played college volleyball at UNC Charlotte and interned with several professional sports teams, and their other daughter was a cheerleader at the University of Mississippi.

Servais resided in Renton, Washington, while managing the Mariners, and his family also lived in Larkspur, Colorado.
