= Kristopher Negrón =

American baseball player & coach (born 1986)

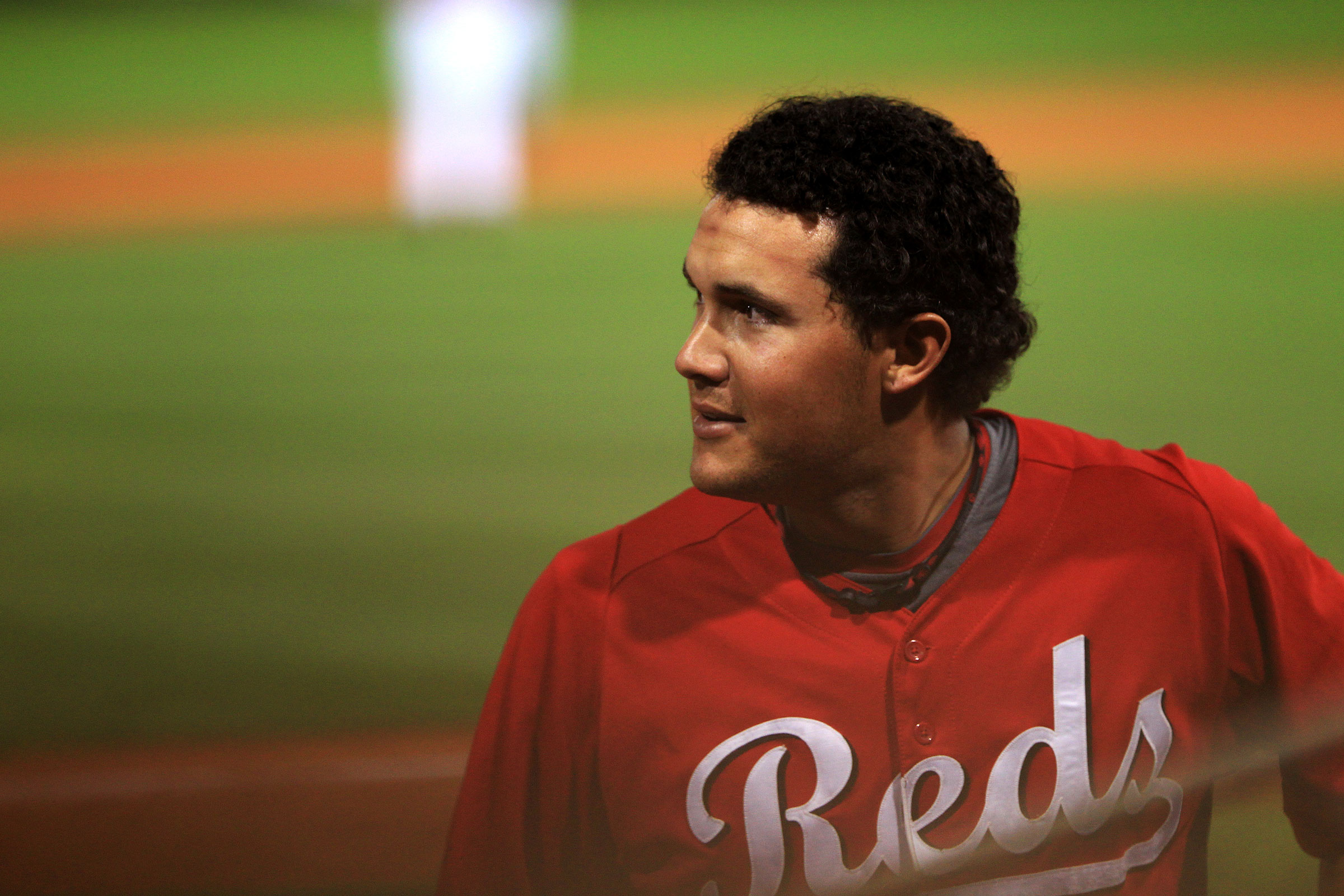
- Negrón with the Cincinnati Reds

Pittsburgh Pirates – No. 41
- Utility player / Coach
- Born: February 1, 1986 (age 40); Willingboro Township, New Jersey, U.S.
- Batted: Right Threw: Right

MLB debut
- June 7, 2012, for the Cincinnati Reds

Last MLB appearance
- September 29, 2019, for the Los Angeles Dodgers

MLB statistics
- Batting average: .221
- Home runs: 9
- Runs batted in: 32
- Stats at Baseball Reference

Teams
- As player: Cincinnati Reds (2012, 2014–2015); Arizona Diamondbacks (2017–2018); Seattle Mariners (2018–2019); Los Angeles Dodgers (2019); As coach: Seattle Mariners (2022–2025); Pittsburgh Pirates (2026–present)

Kristopher David Negrón (born February 1, 1986) is an American former professional baseball utility player and current bench coach for the Pittsburgh Pirates of Major League Baseball (MLB). He played in MLB for the Cincinnati Reds, Arizona Diamondbacks, Seattle Mariners, and Los Angeles Dodgers. He played every defensive position in MLB except pitcher and catcher, spending the most time at third base and second base.

== Early life ==
Negrón was born in New Jersey and later attended Vanden High School in Fairfield, California. He played baseball, football, and track in high school. His mother, Mary, is Dominican, and his father, Dan, is Puerto Rican. He earned a baseball scholarship to UC Davis but lost it after one year due to poor grades. He transferred to Cosumnes River College in Sacramento, California. In 2006, he hit .361 with 78 runs scored and 31 steals. He was selected by the Boston Red Sox in the seventh round, 223rd overall, of the 2006 Major League Baseball draft.

== Playing career ==
=== Boston Red Sox ===
Negrón started his first professional season batting .234 in his first 25 games for the rookie class Gulf Coast League Red Sox. However, over the final 16 games he hit .292 with two home runs and 10 runs batted in. He was promoted to the Low–A Lowell Spinners on August 26, 2006. In 2007, Negron started the season with the Single–A Greenville Drive. He hit .226 with three home runs and 29 RBI. He was promoted to the High–A Lancaster JetHawks on August 31. He stole two bases in three games for the JetHawks.

Back in Greenville for the 2008 season, Negrón hit .244 over 92 games. He showed his speed, stealing 25 bases and hitting five triples while scoring 50 runs. Negrón played three games for the Double-A Portland Sea Dogs during a brief July call-up and finished the season with the Lancaster JetHawks again. In 33 games, he hit .328 with seven home runs and 19 RBI. The JetHawks made the playoffs, and Negrón went 10–for–39 with two homers and seven RBI in nine games, capped off with a 10th inning, three run walk-off homer in game two of the California League semifinal series.

Negrón showed strong numbers against left-handed pitching in 2008, hitting a combined .355 with a .600 slugging percentage. He finished the season with a total combined average of .265. He set career highs with eight home runs, 24 doubles and 46 RBI. Negrón spent the first 111 games of his 2009 season with the Salem Red Sox, the new High–A team of the Red Sox. He hit .264 with three homers and 34 RBI.

=== Cincinnati Reds ===
Negrón was traded to the Cincinnati Reds on August 14, 2009, for shortstop Álex González and cash. After eight games with the Sarasota Reds, he was promoted to the Double-A Carolina Mudcats. He hit .241 in 54 at-bats. In 2010 for the Mudcats, Negrón hit .272 in 470 at-bats. Although his power numbers slightly dropped to six home runs and a .351 slugging percentage, his on-base percentage increased to .344. He was promoted to the Triple-A Louisville Bats late in the season and went 4-for-21. Following the 2010 season, he played for the Peoria Saguaros in the Arizona Fall League and was placed on the Reds 40-man roster. He spent all of 2011 with Louisville, where he hit .216 in 123 games.

Negrón began 2012 with Louisville, but on June 6 he was called up for the first time to the Major Leagues, and made his Reds' debut the next day as a pinch-runner against the Pittsburgh Pirates. On June 14, he got his first Major League hit, a single off Scott Barnes, in the bottom of the fifth inning in Cincinnati. He returned to Louisville after four appearances with the Reds, where he had the one hit in four at-bats. Negrón hit .218 with six homers and 20 RBIs at Louisville until he tore the anterior cruciate ligament and medial meniscus in his right knee on July 5, costing him the rest of the season. On November 30, 2012, he was non-tendered by the Reds and removed from the 40-man roster. However, he agreed to a minor league contract with the Reds for the 2013 season that included an invitation to major league spring training. In 2013, all at Louisville, he hit .225 with five homers and 30 RBIs. He played for Criollos de Caguas in the Puerto Rican Winter League after the season.

Negrón began 2014 Louisville in 2014, batting .269 for the Bats. In early July, he was called up to the big leagues for the second time in his career, replacing the injured Brandon Phillips. On July 13, Negrón, who started at second base, hit his first big-league home run off Francisco Liriano and tallied his first three RBIs against the Pittsburgh Pirates. His playing time was significant for the injury-ravaged Reds; he made the most of it with a three-game stretch against the Cleveland Indians August 5–7, going a combined 7–15 with two doubles, one home run and five RBIs. On August 15, playing against the Colorado Rockies, he had his first four-hit game, going 4–4 with four singles and one RBI. Overall, he hit .271 with six homers and 17 RBI in 49 games for the Reds in 2014. In 2015, he split the season between Louisville and Cincinnati, hitting .216 in 59 games for Louisville and .140 in 43 games for the Reds. His season ended early when he suffered a partially dislocated shoulder, fractured scapula, and torn labrum while making a catch at Great American Ball Park on September 8. He was released by the Reds in October and became a free agent.

=== Chicago Cubs ===
After spending the off-season rehabbing from his shoulder injury, Negrón signed a minor league contract with the Chicago Cubs that included an invitation to spring training on January 14, 2016. He spent the entirety of 2016 season with the Triple–A Iowa Cubs, where he hit .256/.308/.403 with nine home runs, 46 RBI, and 23 stolen bases across 117 games. Negrón elected free agency following the season on November 7.

=== Arizona Diamondbacks ===
On November 21, 2016, Negrón signed a minor league contract with the Arizona Diamondbacks. He was assigned to the Reno Aces of the Pacific Coast League, where he hit .300 in 120 games with 13 homers and 64 RBI. The Diamondbacks called him up to the majors in September He had four hits in 25 at–bats (.160) for the Diamondbacks that season in 14 games. He was added to the Diamondbacks roster for the Wild Card Game and 2017 NLDS but did not play in the postseason. He was outrighted off the roster after the season but re–signed with the team on a new minor league deal and was invited to spring training. He was assigned to Reno to begin the 2018 campaign, but was called up by the Diamondbacks on June 4, 2018 and appeared in two games, on June 4 and June 5 against the San Francisco Giants, with one hit in three at-bats before he was designated for assignment on June 6 and outrighted back to Reno. He hit .283 in 118 games for Reno during the year.

=== Seattle Mariners ===
On August 30, 2018, Negrón was traded to the Seattle Mariners for cash considerations and he was added to the major league roster on September 1. He batted .219/.242/.313 combined for the Mariners and Diamondbacks in 2018. That season, he had the fastest baserunning sprint speed of all MLB third basemen, at 29.5 feet/second. He was outrighted to the Triple–A Tacoma Rainiers on March 13, 2019, when he did not make the roster out of spring training In 82 games for Tacoma, he hit .310 wit 12 homers and 61 RBI. On July 16, the Mariners brought him back to the majors, where he hit .217 in 10 games.

=== Los Angeles Dodgers ===
On July 9, 2019, Negrón was traded to the Los Angeles Dodgers in exchange for minor league infielder Daniel Castro. In his first at bat with the team, Negron hit a home run off Kyle Freeland of the Colorado Rockies. He was placed on the injured list on August 20, returning to the team on August 30. He hit a single in his final MLB at-bat in the Dodgers' final regular season game. He played in 30 games for the Dodgers, hitting .259. He was left of the team's roster for the National League Division Series.

== Coaching career ==
=== Seattle Mariners ===
Negrón announced his retirement from professional baseball on November 12, 2019. On November 19, Negrón was hired by the Seattle Mariners as assistant to the director of player development. On January 27, 2021, Negrón was announced as the manager for the Tacoma Rainiers, the Mariners Triple-A affiliate. The Rainiers were the 2021 Triple-A West Champions and Negrón was named Triple-A West manager of the year.

In 2022, Negrón became the first base coach for the Mariners. On April 20, he made his debut as the interim Mariners manager, while manager Scott Servais was unavailable after testing positive for COVID-19. The Mariners beat the Texas Rangers that day under Negrón's management.

On November 26, 2024, Negrón became the third base coach for the Mariners.

=== Pittsburgh Pirates ===
On November 15, 2025, Negrón was hired by the Pittsburgh Pirates as their bench coach.

== Personal ==
Negrón and his wife, Allison, met in 2005 as students at UC Davis and married in 2010. They have twin sons, Gianni and Lorenzo, who were born in June 2021. They live in Napa, California.
