= Mike Zunino =

American baseball player (born 1991)

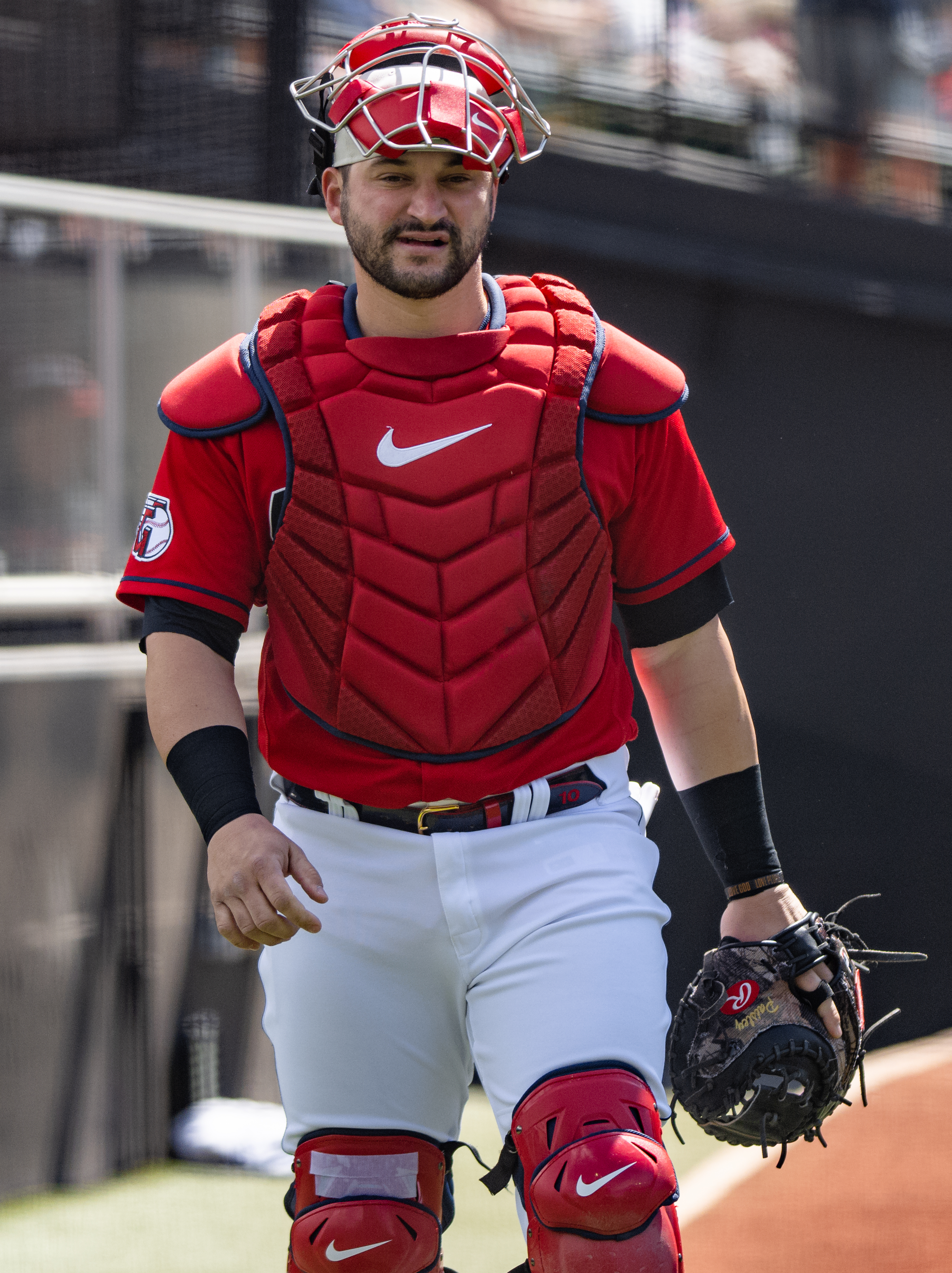
- Zunino with the Cleveland Guardians in 2023
- Catcher
- Born: March 25, 1991 (age 35); Cape Coral, Florida, U.S.
- Batted: Right Threw: Right

MLB debut
- June 12, 2013, for the Seattle Mariners

Last MLB appearance
- June 14, 2023, for the Cleveland Guardians

MLB statistics
- Batting average: .199
- Home runs: 149
- Runs batted in: 372
- Stats at Baseball Reference

Teams
- Seattle Mariners (2013–2018); Tampa Bay Rays (2019–2022); Cleveland Guardians (2023)

Career highlights and awards
- All-Star (2021); Golden Spikes Award (2012); Dick Howser Trophy (2012)

Michael Accorsi Zunino (born March 25, 1991) is an American former professional baseball catcher. He played in Major League Baseball (MLB) for the Seattle Mariners, Tampa Bay Rays, and Cleveland Guardians.

Before beginning his professional career, Zunino played college baseball at the University of Florida, where he won the Dick Howser Trophy, Golden Spikes Award, and Johnny Bench Award in his junior year. The Mariners selected Zunino with the third overall pick in the 2012 MLB draft, and he made his MLB debut with Seattle in 2013. He set franchise records for home runs by a catcher for both the Mariners and Rays, with whom he made the 2021 All-Star Game.

== Early life ==
Born and raised in Cape Coral, Florida, Mike is the son of Greg and Paola Zunino. He is of Italian descent. His parents met in Italy, where Greg played for Fortitudo Baseball Bologna and Paola was a catcher for the Italian national softball team. Greg was drafted in the 31st round of the 1981 MLB draft and later worked as a scout for the Cincinnati Reds. Mike's uncle, Gary Zunino, was a catcher in the St. Louis Cardinals system.

Zunino played baseball at Mariner High School in Cape Coral, where he graduated in 2009. He participated in the AFLAC All-American High School Baseball Game at Dodger Stadium in 2008.

== College career ==
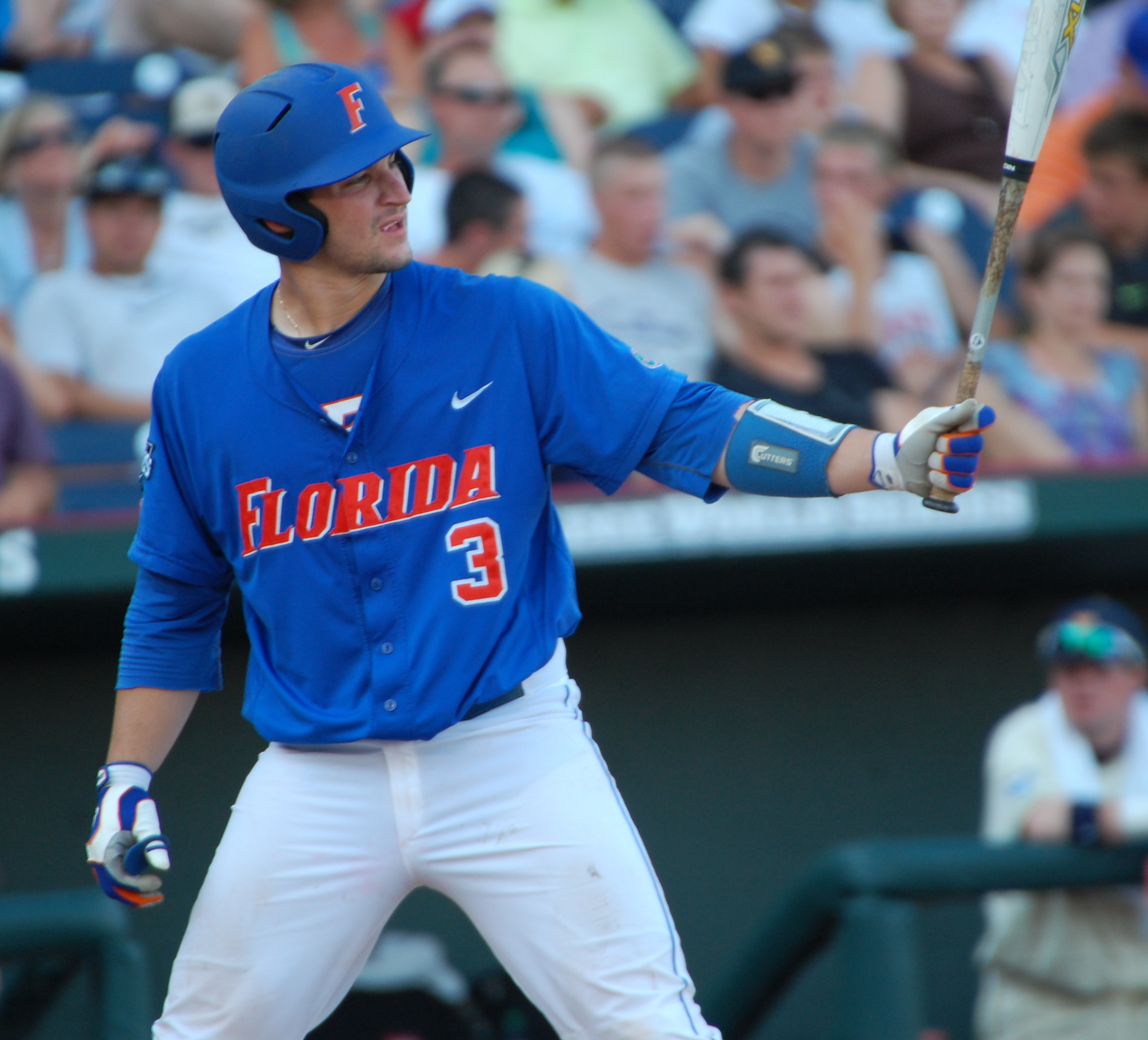
Zunino at the 2012 College World Series

The Oakland Athletics selected Zunino in the 29th round of the 2009 MLB draft, but he did not sign and chose to attend college. He later said he never second guessed his decision to not sign with Oakland. Zunino accepted an athletic scholarship to attend the University of Florida, where he played for the Florida Gators from 2010 to 2012. He led the Gators to three consecutive College World Series appearances in 2010, 2011, and 2012.

Zunino was named to the Baseball America All-American team as a sophomore in 2011 and was named Southeastern Conference (SEC) player of the year. He was the second Gator to win the SEC player of the year award after Matt LaPorta did so in 2005 and 2007. In 2011, Zunino played with the Yarmouth–Dennis Red Sox of the Cape Cod Baseball League. In 2012, Zunino won the Golden Spikes Award, Dick Howser Trophy, and the Johnny Bench Award.

== Professional career ==
=== Seattle Mariners (2013–2018) ===
==== 2012: Draft and minor leagues ====
The Seattle Mariners selected Zunino in the first round, with the third overall selection of the 2012 MLB draft. He signed with the Mariners on July 3, receiving a $4 million signing bonus, and was assigned to the Everett AquaSox of the Class A-Short Season in the Northwest League. Zunino spent six weeks with Everett in 2012, batting .373 with 10 home runs and 35 runs batted in (RBIs). He was promoted to the Jackson Generals of the Double-A Southern League on August 13. In 15 games with Jackson, he batted .333. After the regular season, Zunino played for the Peoria Javelinas of the Arizona Fall League (AFL). He batted .288 in 19 games for Peoria and appeared in the AFL Rising Stars Game.

==== 2013: MLB debut ====
Zunino opened the 2013 season as a member of the Tacoma Rainiers of the Triple-A Pacific Coast League. He batted .238 with 11 homers and 43 RBI with 59 strikeouts in 185 at-bats for Tacoma through June 10.

The Mariners promoted Zunino to the major leagues on June 11, 2013. He made his first major league start the next day and singled in his second at bat, on an 0–2 pitch. On June 14, he hit his first major league home run. Against the Chicago Cubs on June 28, he collected the first walk-off hit of his career. On July 25, Zunino broke his hand and was placed on the 15-day disabled list. He returned in early September, getting the bulk of the starts to end the season. In 52 games with the Mariners, he hit .214/.290/.329 with five home runs and 14 RBIs in his rookie season.

==== 2014–2018 ====
The Mariners added John Buck as a backup and mentor to Zunino ahead of the 2014 season. That year, Zunino was good defensively and an over-aggressive power hitter. He batted .199 in 2014 with 22 home runs. He had poor plate discipline, striking out 158 times and walking 17 times for a .254 on-base percentage. He led the American League (AL) with 17 hit by pitches. He won the Wilson Defensive Player of the Year Award at catcher.

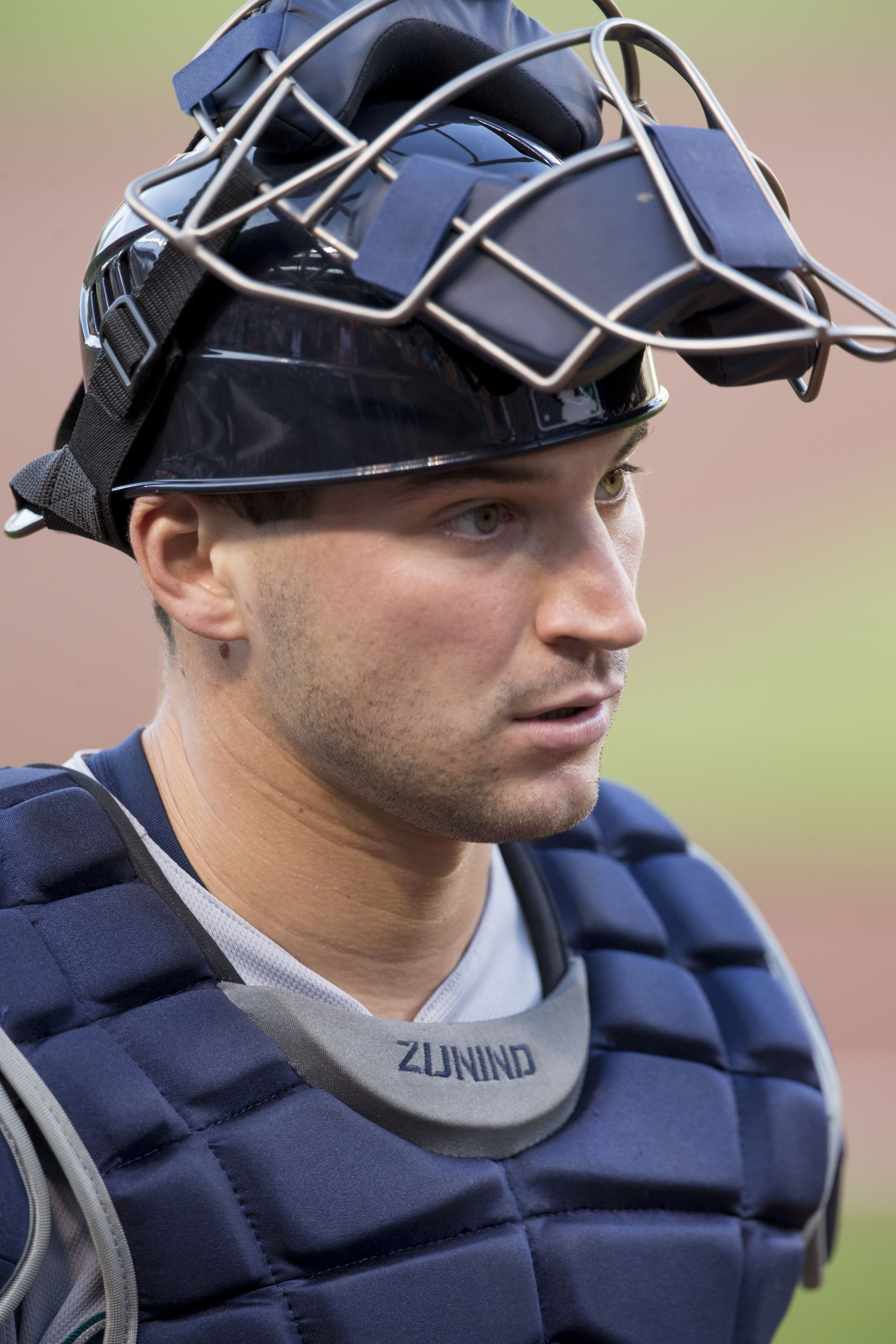
Zunino with the Mariners in 2015

Zunino started his second consecutive Opening Day in 2015, again catching Félix Hernández. In August, the Mariners demoted Zunino to Tacoma. He was hitting .174 with 132 strikeouts in 112 games played in Seattle. He remained in Triple-A for the final month of the season. After Seattle signed Chris Iannetta, Zunino began the 2016 season in Triple-A. He was called up briefly in late June, hitting two home runs in his first MLB game of the season, but returned to the minor leagues in early July. He rejoined Seattle in late July, starting regularly the rest of the season. He finished 2016 with a .207 batting average in 55 games with 12 home runs.

Zunino had his best offensive season with the Mariners in 2017, with career bests with a .251 average, 64 RBI, 25 doubles and 124 games, also clubbing 25 home runs. He said he changed his mindset after talking with teammate Robinson Canó and reading a book by former MLB pitcher Bob Tewkesbury. On May 8, 2018, Zunino caught James Paxton's no-hitter against the Toronto Blue Jays, a 5–0 victory. Zunino regressed in his final season with Seattle, hitting .201 with 20 home runs and 44 RBIs.

While he struggled to make contact, Zunino set Mariners single-season and career records for home runs by a catcher, both later surpassed by Cal Raleigh.

=== Tampa Bay Rays (2019–2022) ===
On November 8, 2018, the Mariners traded Zunino, Guillermo Heredia, and Michael Plassmeyer to the Tampa Bay Rays for outfielders Mallex Smith and Jake Fraley. Zunino hit his first home run as a Ray on April 22, 2019, a go-ahead two-run shot against the Kansas City Royals.

On November 25, 2019, Zunino agreed to a one-year, $4.5 million contract, avoiding salary arbitration. Zunino finished the shortened 2020 season batting .147 with 4 home runs over 28 games. He missed several weeks with a left oblique strain. The Rays had the best record in the AL. In the AL playoffs, home runs with eight RBIs. The Rays won every game in which Zunino recorded an RBI, including Game 7 of the AL Championship Series against the Houston Astros. The Rays advanced to the World Series, losing to the Los Angeles Dodgers in six games. Zunino started all six games, getting one single and one walk in 17 plate appearances.

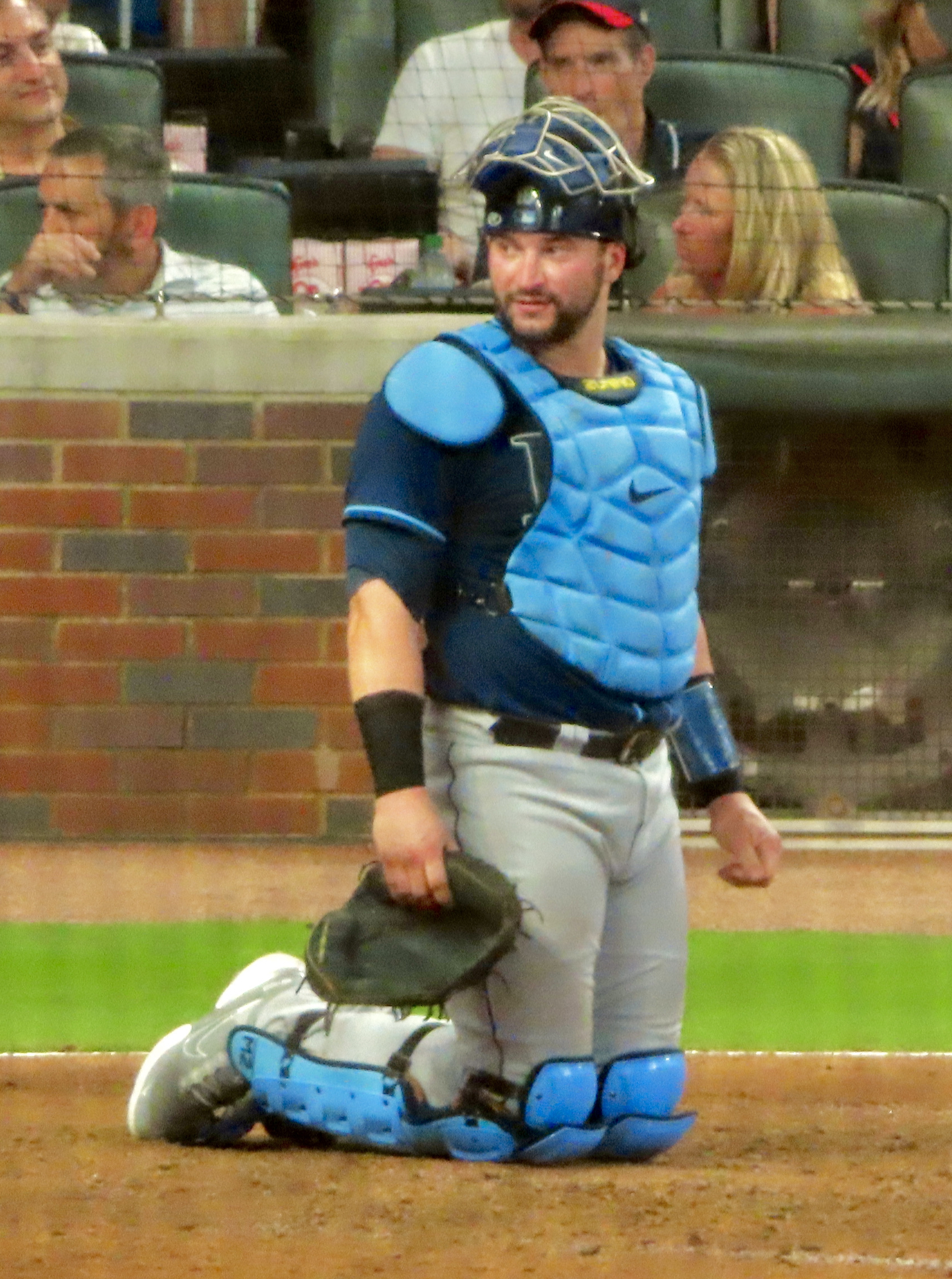
Zunino with the Rays in July 2021

The Rays declined their $4.5 million team option for Zunino for the 2021 season on October 30, 2020, and he became a free agent. On December 16, he re-signed with the Rays on a one-year, $3 million contract with a club option for 2022. On July 4, Zunino was named to the All-Star Game as a reserve. He homered against New York Mets pitcher Taijuan Walker in the game, becoming the second Ray with an All-Star Game home run. He had the highest slugging percentage against left-handers of all major leaguers in 2021, at .868. His career-high 31 home runs were a franchise record, and local baseball writers named him the team MVP. He led the AL in passed balls for the second consecutive season.

Zunino played in 36 games in 2022 through June 9, when he experienced thoracic outlet syndrome in his left arm. He underwent surgery in July, ending his season. He batted .148 with 5 home runs. In four season with the Rays, he set the franchise record for home runs by a catcher with 51, 7 more than Toby Hall.

=== Cleveland Guardians (2023) ===
On December 15, 2022, Zunino signed a one-year, $6 million contract with the Cleveland Guardians. In 42 games in 2023, he struggled to a .177/.271/.306 slash line with 3 home runs and 11 RBI. He had the highest strikeout rate of any batter with 80 plate appearances and slow exit velocities on balls he did hit. On June 16, Cleveland designated Zunino for assignment as the team promoted pitcher Touki Toussaint. Cleveland released Zunino on June 21.

Zunino retired from professional baseball on March 6, 2024.

== Personal life ==
Zunino married his high school girlfriend in Florida on October 6, 2012. They have two children, born in 2019 and 2020.

== See also ==
- 2012 College Baseball All-America Team
