= Chasen Bradford =

American baseball player (born 1989)

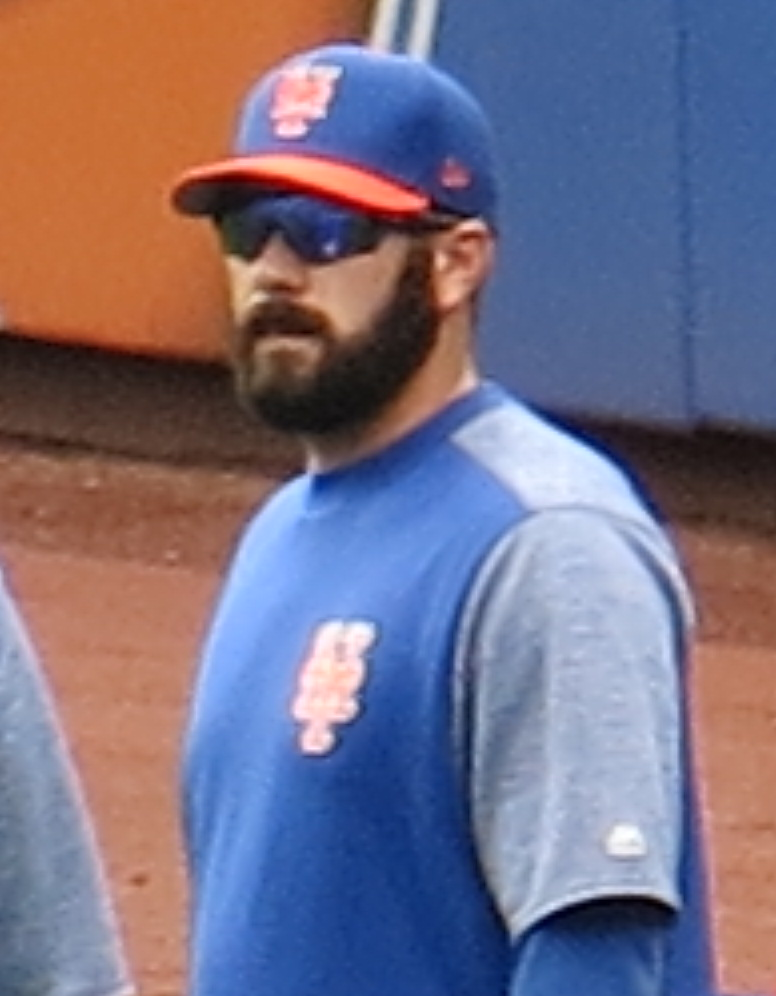
- Bradford with the Mets in 2017
- Pitcher
- Born: August 5, 1989 (age 36); Las Vegas, Nevada, U.S.
- Batted: Right Threw: Right

MLB debut
- June 25, 2017, for the New York Mets

Last MLB appearance
- June 2, 2019, for the Seattle Mariners

MLB statistics
- Win–loss record: 7–0
- Earned run average: 3.89
- Strikeouts: 76
- Stats at Baseball Reference

Teams
- New York Mets (2017); Seattle Mariners (2018–2019)

Chasen David Bradford (born August 5, 1989) is an American former professional baseball pitcher. He played in Major League Baseball (MLB) for the New York Mets and Seattle Mariners.

== Early life ==
Bradford was born to Lauren and Doug Bradford in Las Vegas, Nevada, and graduated from Silverado High School in 2008. Bradford played college baseball at the College of Southern Nevada and then the University of Central Florida. In 2011, as a senior at UCF, Bradford went 6–2 with a 5.30 ERA in 52.2 innings.

== Professional career ==
=== New York Mets ===
Bradford was drafted by the New York Mets in the 35th round of the 2011 MLB draft and signed for $1,000. He made his professional debut that same year for the Kingsport Mets and spent the whole season there, compiling a 3.51 ERA in 33.1 innings pitched. In 2012, he pitched for the Savannah Sand Gnats where he was 4–5 with a 2.47 ERA in 37 relief appearances, and in 2013, he played with both the St. Lucie Mets and Binghamton Mets where he pitched to a combined 9–3 record and 2.61 ERA in 69 innings pitched out of the bullpen. Bradford spent 2014 with Binghamton and the Las Vegas 51s where he was 4–4 with a 2.97 ERA in 57 appearances, 2015 with Las Vegas where he posted a 5–4 record and 4.10 ERA in 53 relief appearances, and 2016 back with Las Vegas where he was 5–3 with a 4.80 ERA in 65.2 relief innings pitched. He began 2017 with Las Vegas.

Bradford was called up to the majors for the first time on June 22, 2017. He made his major league debut on June 25 against the San Francisco Giants at AT&T Park, striking out Nick Hundley and Denard Span in a scoreless ninth inning. He was sent down to Las Vegas on July 17 and recalled on August 1, and spent the remainder of the season there. Bradford recorded his first major league win on August 2 against the Colorado Rockies at Coors Field. In 28 appearances for the Mets he was 2–0 with a 3.74 ERA.

Bradford was designated for assignment by the Mets on January 18, 2018.

=== Seattle Mariners ===
Bradford was claimed off waivers by the Seattle Mariners on January 19, 2018. He began the season with the Tacoma Rainiers and was recalled by Seattle on April 9. In 46 games for Seattle, he finished 5–0 in 53 2/3 innings. In August 2019, Bradford underwent Tommy John surgery, causing him to miss the rest of the 2019 season. He was outrighted off of the Mariners roster on October 28, and elected free agency on November 4.

Bradford re-signed with the Mariners organization on a minor league contract on January 15, 2020. He did not play in a game in 2020 due to the cancellation of the minor league season because of the COVID-19 pandemic. Bradford became a free agent on November 2.

=== Atlanta Braves ===
On March 15, 2021, Bradford signed a minor league contract with the Atlanta Braves organization.

=== High Point Rockers ===
On April 21, 2022, Bradford signed with the High Point Rockers of the Atlantic League of Professional Baseball. In 28 games for High Point, he struggled to a 2–3 record and 6.51 ERA with 20 strikeouts and 7 saves over 27 2/3 innings pitched. Bradford retired from professional baseball on September 22.

== Personal life ==
On March 22, 2024 Bradford was arrested in Henderson, Nevada for alleged drunk driving within just 24 hours of being sworn in as a Nevada police officer.
