= Guillermo Heredia =

Cuban baseball player (born 1991)

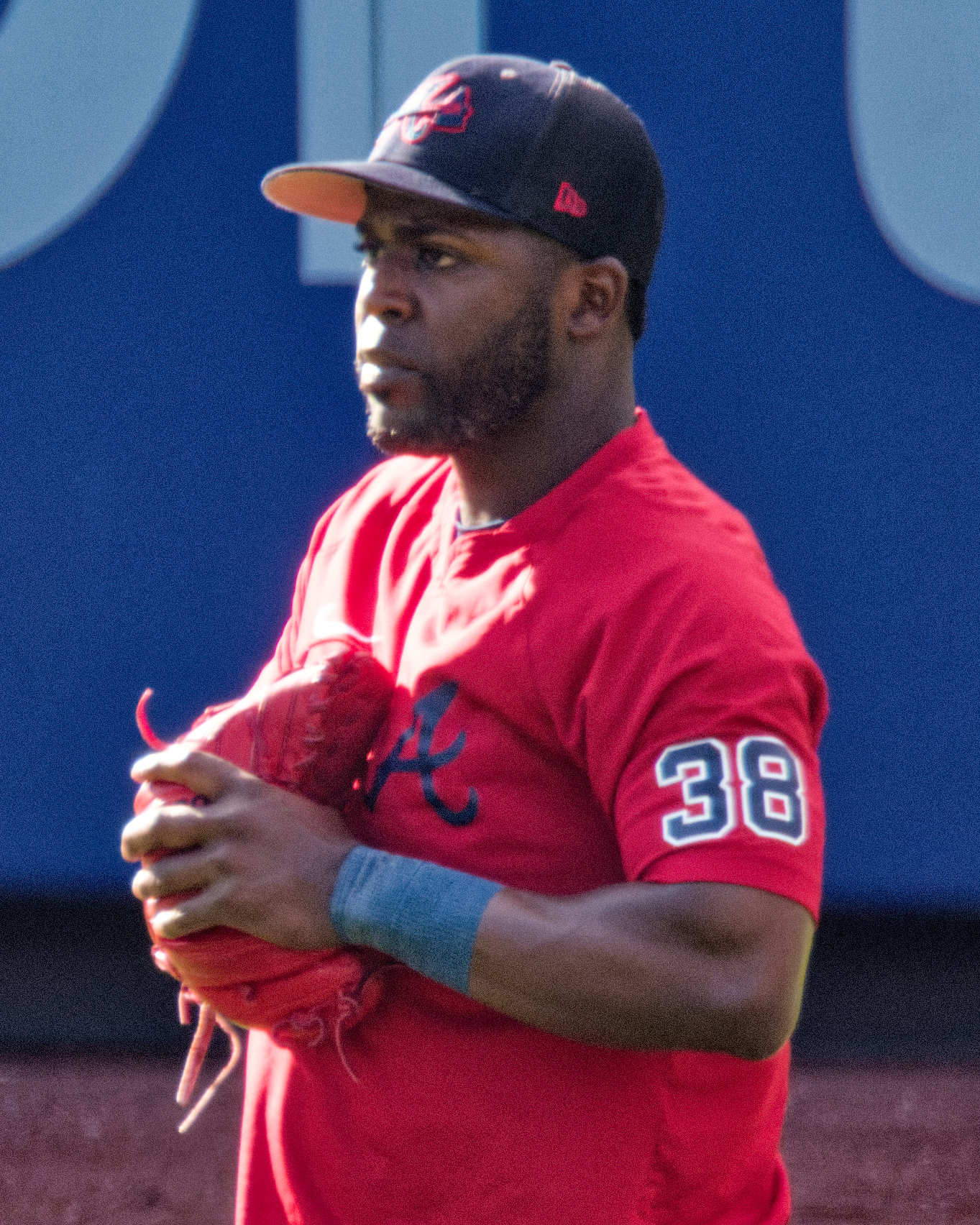
- Heredia with the Braves in 2022
- Outfielder
- Born: January 31, 1991 (age 35); Matanzas, Cuba
- Bats: Right Throws: Left

Professional debut
- MLB: July 29, 2016, for the Seattle Mariners
- KBO: April 1, 2023, for the SSG Landers

MLB statistics (through 2022 season)
- Batting average: .231
- Home runs: 27
- Runs batted in: 114

KBO statistics (through August 21, 2026)
- Batting average: .331
- Home runs: 61
- Runs batted in: 323
- Stats at Baseball Reference

Teams
- Seattle Mariners (2016–2018); Tampa Bay Rays (2019); Pittsburgh Pirates (2020); New York Mets (2020); Atlanta Braves (2021–2022); SSG Landers (2023–2026)

Career highlights and awards
- MLB: World Series champion (2021); KBO: 4× KBO Defensive Award (2023–2026)

Guillermo Heredia Molina Jr. (born January 31, 1991) is a Cuban professional baseball outfielder for the SSG Landers of the KBO League. He has previously played in MLB for the Seattle Mariners, Tampa Bay Rays, Pittsburgh Pirates, New York Mets and Atlanta Braves. He made his MLB debut with Seattle in 2016 and won the 2021 World Series with Atlanta. He began playing in South Korea in 2023.

== Professional career ==
Heredia played for the Cuba national baseball team in the 2013 World Baseball Classic, batting .167 in 6 games. He played for Matanzas in the Cuban National Series beginning in 2009. He hit .285 with a .794 on-base plus slugging and won two of the league's Gold Glove awards for his center field defense. He defected from Cuba in January 2015 to pursue a contract with a Major League Baseball team.

=== Seattle Mariners ===
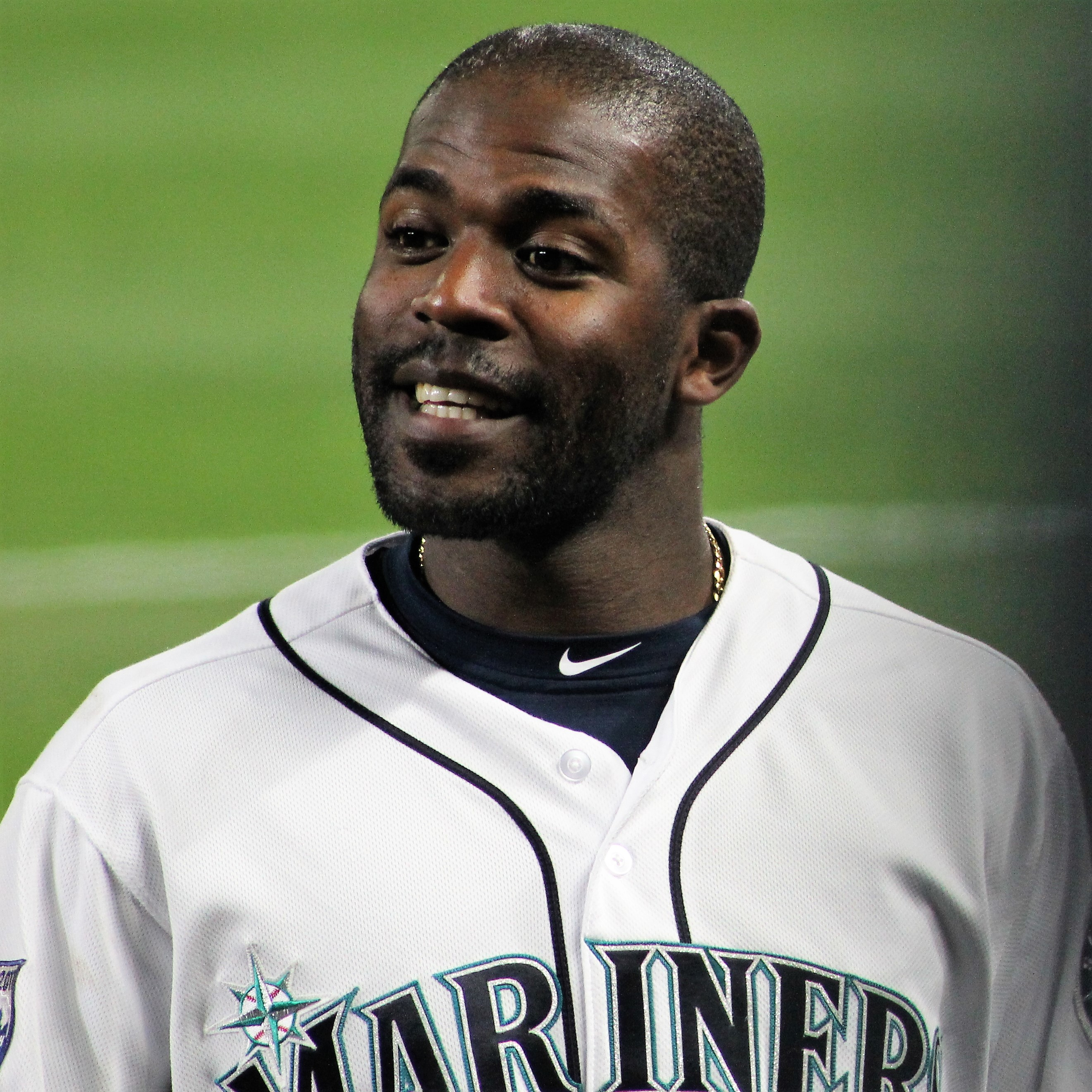
Heredia with the Mariners in 2017

On February 23, 2016, Heredia signed a one-year, $500,000 major league contract with the Seattle Mariners. He made his major league debut on July 29. He spent most of his time on the Mariners in 2016 as a late-innings defensive replacement. He played in the Arizona Fall League to work on making his swing more compact before the start of the 2017 season. He had MLB career highs with 6 home runs, 96 hits, 24 runs batted in, and 105 games started, splitting time between left field and center field.

=== Tampa Bay Rays ===
On November 8, 2018, Heredia was traded with Mike Zunino and Michael Plassmeyer, to the Tampa Bay Rays for Mallex Smith and Jake Fraley. In his sole season with the Rays, he hit .225 in 89 games. On December 2, 2019, the Rays non-tendered Heredia, and he became a free agent.

=== Pittsburgh Pirates ===
On January 9, 2020, Heredia signed a one-year contract with the Pittsburgh Pirates. On August 24, Heredia was designated for assignment by the Pirates after batting 3-for-16 in eight games.

=== New York Mets ===
On August 28, 2020, Heredia was claimed by the New York Mets off waivers. He made his Mets debut on September 21. He started the Mets' next game, hitting a home run against John Curtiss. Heredia was designated for assignment on February 21, 2021, after the Mets signed outfielder Kevin Pillar.

=== Atlanta Braves ===
On February 24, 2021, Heredia was claimed off waivers by the Atlanta Braves. On April 18, he hit two home runs, one a grand slam, to become the first Braves player to record at least 6 RBI in a game from the number 8 spot in the lineup since the RBI became an official stat in 1920. As the season went on, Heredia adopted a sword slashing movement as a celebratory gesture, which was picked up by his teammates. He played in 120 games for Atlanta, batting to a .220/.311/.354 slash line with five home runs and 26 RBI. He played in his only MLB postseason, batting 0-for-3 with a walk in 10 games as Atlanta won the World Series. On November 30, the Braves re-signed Heredia to a one-year, $1 million contract.

Heredia played in 74 games for Atlanta during the 2022 campaign, hitting .158/.220/.342 with three home runs and eight RBI. On November 15, Atlanta designated Heredia for assignment. Three days later, he was non-tendered and became a free agent.

=== SSG Landers ===
On December 11, 2022, Heredia signed with the SSG Landers of the KBO League. He played in 122 games for the team in 2023, batting .324/.385/.461 with 12 home runs, 76 RBI, and 12 stolen bases. On December 17, he re-signed with the Landers on a one-year, $1.5 million contract. Heredia played in 136 games for the Landers in 2024, slashing .360/.399/.538 with 21 home runs and 118 RBI. On November 26, Heredia re–signed with the Landers on a $1.6 million contract. On April 20, 2025, Heredia was ruled out for at least six weeks due to an infection and was replaced by Ryan McBroom. In 96 games for the team, Heredia batted .339/.398/.491 with 13 home runs and 54 RBI. On December 29, Heredia re-signed with the Landers on a one-year $1.3 million contract.

== Personal life ==
Heredia's father played in the Cuban National Series for 11 seasons.
