= Brian DeLunas =

American baseball coach (1975–2022)

- Pitching coach
- Born: May 3, 1975; St. Louis, Missouri
- Died: January 16, 2022 (aged 46); Columbia, Missouri

Teams
- As coach: Seattle Mariners (2018, 2020)

Brian DeLunas (May 3, 1975 – January 17, 2022) was an American baseball coach. He served as the bullpen coach of the Seattle Mariners of Major League Baseball (MLB) in 2018 and 2020. He was the pitching coach of the Missouri Tigers from 2006 to 2009 then again from June 2021 until his death in January 2022.

== Career ==
DeLunas attended Oakville High School in Oakville, Missouri. He then played college baseball for the Missouri Baptist Spartans. A rotator cuff injury ended his pitching career.

DeLunas began coaching baseball in 2004. He was the pitching coach at Forest Park Community College in 2005 and 2006, then a volunteer assistant pitching coach for the Missouri Tigers from 2006 through 2009, where he helped develop future MLB pitchers Aaron Crow and Kyle Gibson. In 2009, he was the pitching coach for the Duluth Huskies. He then was the pitching coach at Christian Brothers College High School in St. Louis, Missouri in 2010 and 2011. He then co-founded and worked as program director of Premier Pitching and Performance and served as director of pitching development for CSE Baseball, both based in St. Louis.

The Seattle Mariners hired DeLunas as their bullpen coach prior to the 2018 season. He served as the Mariners director of pitching development strategies in the 2019 season. He was returned to the role of bullpen coach for the 2020 season. The Mariners did not renew his contract after the 2020 season. He worked as a special projects coordinator for the New York Mets in 2001. In June 2021, DeLunas became the pitching coach for the Missouri Tigers.

== Personal life ==
DeLunas and his wife, Johannah, had two children. His nephew played college baseball for Missouri, the Middle Tennessee State Blue Raiders, and Jefferson College.

DeLunas died from kidney disease on January 16, 2022, at the age of 46. He had dealt with kidney issues since 2006, getting a kidney transplant from his brother.
