= 2019 Los Angeles Angels season =

Major League Baseball season

2019 Los Angeles Angels
- League: American League
- Division: West
- Ballpark: Angel Stadium
- City: Anaheim, California
- Record: 72–90 (.444)
- Divisional place: 4th
- Owner: Arte Moreno
- Manager: Brad Ausmus
- Television: Fox Sports West (Victor Rojas, Mark Gubicza)
- Radio: KLAA (AM 830); KSPN (AM 710); Angels Radio Network (Terry Smith, Mark Langston, José Mota); Spanish: KWKW (AM 1330)
- Stats: ESPN.com; Baseball Reference

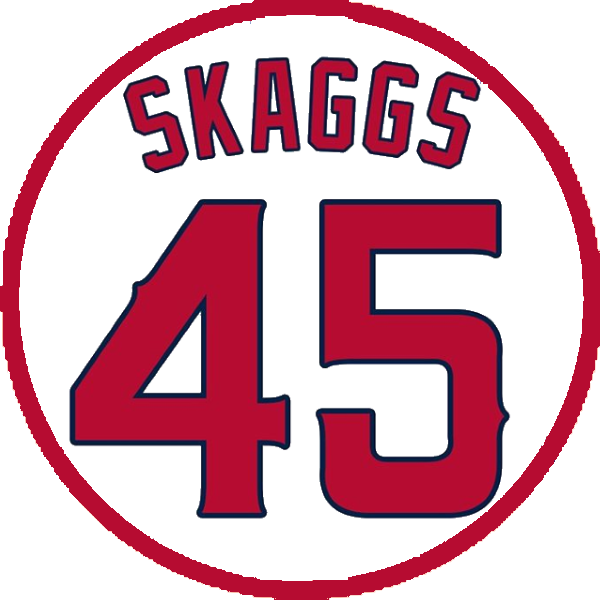
Patch worn in memory of Tyler Skaggs

The 2019 Los Angeles Angels season was the 59th season of the Angels franchise and the 54th in Anaheim (all of them at Angel Stadium). They failed to qualify for the postseason for the fifth straight year, finishing the season with a 72–90 record.

On July 1, 2019, Angels' pitcher Tyler Skaggs died at the age of 27 while in Texas before a series against the Texas Rangers.

After the season, Mike Trout won the last of his three MVP awards.

== Regular season ==
=== Season standings ===
==== American League West ====
AL West
Team	W	L	Pct.	GB	Home	Road
Houston Astros	107	55	.660	—	60‍–‍21	47‍–‍34
Oakland Athletics	97	65	.599	10	52‍–‍29	45‍–‍36
Texas Rangers	78	84	.481	29	45‍–‍36	33‍–‍48
Los Angeles Angels	72	90	.444	35	38‍–‍43	34‍–‍47
Seattle Mariners	68	94	.420	39	35‍–‍46	33‍–‍48

==== American League leaders ====
Division leaders
Team	W	L	Pct.
Houston Astros	107	55	.660
New York Yankees	103	59	.636
Minnesota Twins	101	61	.623

Wild Card teams (Top 2 teams qualify for postseason)
Team	W	L	Pct.	GB
Oakland Athletics	97	65	.599	+1
Tampa Bay Rays	96	66	.593	—
Cleveland Indians	93	69	.574	3
Boston Red Sox	84	78	.519	12
Texas Rangers	78	84	.481	18
Chicago White Sox	72	89	.447	23½
Los Angeles Angels	72	90	.444	24
Seattle Mariners	68	94	.420	28
Toronto Blue Jays	67	95	.414	29
Kansas City Royals	59	103	.364	37
Baltimore Orioles	54	108	.333	42
Detroit Tigers	47	114	.292	48½

=== Game log ===
2019 season game log: 72–90 (Home: 38–43; Away: 34–47)
March: 1–3 (Home: 0–0; Away: 1–3)

#	Date	Opponent	Score	Win	Loss	Save	Attendance	Record	Streak
1	March 28	@ Athletics	0–4	Fiers (1–0)	**Cahill** (0–1)	—	22,961	0–1	L1
2	March 29	@ Athletics	6–2	**Robles** (1–0)	Soria (0–1)	—	22,585	1–1	W1
3	March 30	@ Athletics	2–4	Anderson (1–0)	**Peña** (0–1)	Treinen (1)	16,051	1–2	L1
4	March 31	@ Athletics	1–2	Montas (1–0)	**Skaggs** (0–1)	Treinen (2)	23,265	1–3	L2

April: 12–14 (Home: 9–7; Away: 3–7)

#	Date	Opponent	Score	Win	Loss	Save	Attendance	Record	Streak
5	April 1	@ Mariners	3–6	Hernández (1–0)	**Stratton** (0–1)	Elías (1)	14,463	1–4	L3
6	April 2	@ Mariners	1–2	Gonzales (3–0)	**García** (0–1)	Swarzak (1)	13,567	1–5	L4
7	April 4	Rangers	4–11	Springs (1–0)	**Harvey** (0–1)	—	42,027	1–6	L5
8	April 5	Rangers	3–1	**Anderson** (1–0)	Lynn (0–1)	**Allen** (1)	41,089	2–6	W1
9	April 6	Rangers	5–1	**Skaggs** (1–1)	Smyly (0–1)	—	31,747	3–6	W2
10	April 7	Rangers	7–2	**Anderson** (2–0)	Miller (0–1)	—	42,076	4–6	W3
11	April 8	Brewers	5–2	**Cahill** (1–1)	Chacín (2–1)	**Allen** (2)	28,571	5–6	W4
12	April 9	Brewers	11–8	**Bedrosian** (1–0)	Claudio (0–1)	**Allen** (3)	28,793	6–6	W5
13	April 10	Brewers	4–2	**Barría** (1–0)	Woodruff (1–1)	**Robles** (1)	34,446	7–6	W6
14	April 12	@ Cubs	1–5	Hamels (2–0)	**Skaggs** (1–2)	—	30,102	7–7	L1
15	April 13	@ Cubs	6–5	**Buttrey** (1–0)	Hendricks (0–3)	**Allen** (4)	38,755	8–7	W1
—	April 14	@ Cubs	**Postponed (inclement weather)** (Makeup date: June 3)						
16	April 15	@ Rangers	7–12	Dowdy (1–0)	**Bedrosian** (1–1)	Leclerc (4)	18,265	8–8	L1
17	April 16	@ Rangers	0–5	Minor (2–1)	**Barría** (1–1)	—	17,704	8–9	L2
18	April 17	@ Rangers	4–5	Lynn (2–1)	**Harvey** (0–2)	Leclerc (5)	16,691	8–10	L3
19	April 18	Mariners	10–11	Swarzak (2–0)	**Allen** (0–1)	Elías (3)	33,592	8–11	L4
20	April 19	Mariners	3–5	Rosscup (2–0)	**Allen** (0–2)	Elías (4)	41,021	8–12	L5
21	April 20	Mariners	5–6	Kikuchi (1–1)	**Cahill** (1–2)	Swarzak (3)	41,147	8–13	L6
22	April 21	Mariners	8–6	**Barría** (2–1)	Leake (2–2)	**García** (1)	34,155	9–13	W1
23	April 22	Yankees	3–4 (14)	Holder (1–0)	**Bard** (0–1)	—	35,403	9–14	L1
24	April 23	Yankees	5–7	Germán (4–1)	**Stratton** (0–2)	Britton (1)	38,016	9–15	L2
25	April 24	Yankees	5–6	Loáisiga (1–0)	**Buttrey** (1–1)	Chapman (4)	37,928	9–16	L3
26	April 25	Yankees	11–5	**Ramirez** (1–0)	Tanaka (2–2)	—	39,584	10–16	W1
27	April 26	@ Royals	5–1	**Skaggs** (2–2)	Duffy (0–1)	—	23,186	11–16	W2
28	April 27	@ Royals	4–9	Barlow (1–0)	**Barría** (2–2)	—	18,755	11–17	L1
29	April 28	@ Royals	7–3	**Harvey** (1–2)	Bailey (2–3)	—	21,549	12–17	W1
30	April 30	Blue Jays	4–3	**Buttrey** (2–1)	Tepera (0–1)	**Robles** (2)	38,797	13–17	W2

May: 14–13 (Home: 6–7; Away: 8–6)

#	Date	Opponent	Score	Win	Loss	Save	Attendance	Record	Streak
31	May 1	Blue Jays	6–3	**Peña** (1-1)	Stroman (1-4)	**Buttrey** (1)	33,082	14–17	W3
32	May 2	Blue Jays	6–2	**Skaggs** (3-2)	Sanchez (3-2)	—	40,064	15–17	W4
33	May 4 @ Estadio de Béisbol Monterrey	Astros	2–14	Miley (2-2)	**Cahill** (1-3)	—	18,177	15–18	L1
34	May 5 @ Estadio de Béisbol Monterrey	Astros	4–10	Verlander (5-1)	**Harvey** (1-3)	—	17,614	15–19	L2
35	May 7	@ Tigers	5–2	**Canning** (1-0)	Norris (1–1)	**Robles** (3)	14,169	16–19	W1
36	May 8	@ Tigers	3–10	Boyd (4-2)	**Skaggs** (3-3)	—	13,224	16–20	L1
37	May 9	@ Tigers	13–0	**Peña** (2-1)	Carpenter (0-1)	—	16,404	17–20	W1
38	May 10	@ Orioles	8–3	**Cahill** (2-3)	Straily (1-3)	—	14,495	18–20	W2
39	May 11	@ Orioles	7–2	**Bard** (1-0)	Bundy (1-5)	—	21,106	19–20	W3
40	May 12	@ Orioles	1–5	Means (5-3)	**Canning** (1-1)	—	16,387	19–21	L1
41	May 13	@ Twins	5–4	**Skaggs** (4-3)	Berríos (6-2)	**Robles** (4)	21,359	20–21	W1
42	May 14	@ Twins	3–4	Gibson (4-1)	**Bedrosian** (1-2)	Parker (7)	26,747	20-22	L1
43	May 15	@ Twins	7–8	Odorizzi (6-2)	**Cahill** (2-4)	Morin (1)	31,919	20–23	L2
44	May 17	Royals	5–2	**Harvey** (2-3)	Keller (2-5)	**Robles** (5)	43,444	21–23	W1
45	May 18	Royals	6–3	**Canning** (2-1)	Junis (3-5)	**Buttrey** (2)	43,415	22–23	W2
46	May 19	Royals	1–5	Duffy (3-1)	**Skaggs** (4-4)	—	43,329	22–24	L1
47	May 20	Twins	1–3	Rogers (1-0)	**Buttrey** (2-2)	Parker (8)	34,177	22–25	L2
48	May 21	Twins	3–8	Pineda (4-3)	**Bard** (1-2)	—	32,316	22–26	L3
49	May 22	Twins	Postponed (rain) Makeup date: May 23						
49	May 23	Twins	7–16	Pérez (7-1)	**Harvey** (2-4)	—	30,992	22–27	L4
50	May 24	Rangers	3–4	Smyly (1-3)	**Smyly** (1-3)	Kelley (5)	43,806	22–28	L5
51	May 25	Rangers	3–2	**Robles** (2–0)	Kelley (3–1)	—	36,392	23–28	W1
52	May 26	Rangers	7–6	**García** (1–1)	Springs (2–1)	**Anderson** (1)	39,406	24–28	W2
53	May 27	@ Athletics	5–8	Bassitt (3–1)	**Cahill** (2–5)	Treinen (11)	20,409	24–29	L1
54	May 28	@ Athletics	6–4	**Buttrey** (3–2)	Soria (1–4)	**Robles** (6)	13,060	25–29	W1
55	May 29	@ Athletics	12–7 (11)	**Ramirez** (2–0)	Trivino (2–1)	—	21,185	26–29	W2
56	May 30	@ Mariners	9–3	**Peña** (3–1)	Kikuchi (3–3)	—	13,972	27–29	W3
57	May 31	@ Mariners	3–4	Leake (4–6)	**Skaggs** (4–5)	Bass (1)	32,164	27–30	L1

June: 15–13 (Home: 7–6; Away: 8–6)

#	Date	Opponent	Score	Win	Loss	Save	Attendance	Record	Streak
58	June 1	@ Mariners	6–3	**Bedrosian** (2–3)	Brennan (2–3)	**Robles** (7)	28,128	28–30	W1
59	June 2	@ Mariners	13–3	**Suárez** (1–0)	Gonzales (5–6)	—	28,912	29–30	W2
60	June 3	@ Cubs	1–8	Lester (4–4)	**Cahill** (2–6)	—	39,843	29–31	L1
61	June 4	Athletics	2–4	Montas (7–2)	**Canning** (2–2)	Treinen (12)	36,009	29–32	L2
62	June 5	Athletics	10–9	**Robles** (3–0)	Trivino (2–4)	—	36,065	30–32	W1
63	June 6	Athletics	4–7	Fiers (5–3)	**Skaggs** (4–6)	—	34,109	30–33	L1
64	June 7	Mariners	2–6	Gonzales (6–6)	**Heaney** (0–1)	—	41,495	30–34	L2
65	June 8	Mariners	12–3	**Peters** (1–0)	Kikuchi (3–4)	—	40,569	31–34	W1
66	June 9	Mariners	3–9	LeBlanc (3–2)	**Suárez** (1–1)	—	41,614	31–35	L1
67	June 10	Dodgers	5–3	**Buttrey** (4–2)	Kelly (1–3)	**Robles** (8)	45,477	32–35	W1
68	June 11	Dodgers	5–3	**Peña** (4–1)	Maeda (7–3)	**Robles** (9)	45,404	33–35	W2
69	June 13	@ Rays	5–3	**Skaggs** (5–6)	Yarbrough (5–3)	**Bedrosian** (1)	15,291	34–35	W3
70	June 14	@ Rays	4–9	Pagán (2–1)	**Buttrey** (4–3)	—	21,598	34–36	L1
71	June 15	@ Rays	5–3	**Suárez** (2–1)	Morton (8–1)	**Robles** (10)	22,320	35–36	W1
72	June 16	@ Rays	5–6	Poche (1–1)	**Canning** (2–3)	Castillo (7)	20,508	35–37	L1
73	June 17	@ Blue Jays	10–5	**Peña** (5–1)	Jackson (1–5)	—	15,227	36–37	W1
74	June 18	@ Blue Jays	3–1	**Skaggs** (6–6)	Stroman (4–9)	**Robles** (11)	17,259	37–37	W2
75	June 19	@ Blue Jays	11–6	**Ramirez** (3–0)	Sanchez (3–9)	—	16,225	38–37	W3
76	June 20	@ Blue Jays	5–7 (10)	Kingham (2–1)	**Buttrey** (4–4)	—	24,291	38–38	L1
77	June 21	@ Cardinals	1–5	Wacha (5–3)	**Canning** (2–4)	—	48,423	38–39	L2
78	June 22	@ Cardinals	2–4	Hudson (6–3)	**Peña** (5–2)	Webb (1)	46,711	38–40	L3
79	June 23	@ Cardinals	6–4	**Skaggs** (7–6)	Mikolas (5–8)	—	47,114	39–40	W1
80	June 25	Reds	5–1	**Heaney** (1–1)	Mahle (2–8)	—	37,260	40–40	W2
81	June 26	Reds	5–1	**Bedrosian** (3–3)	Iglesias (1–7)	—	35,272	41–40	W3
82	June 27	Athletics	8–3	**Canning** (3–4)	Anderson (0–3)	—	40,231	42–40	W4
83	June 28	Athletics	2–7	Fiers (8–3)	**Ramirez** (3–1)	—	41,913	42–41	L1
84	June 29	Athletics	0–4	Anderson (8–5)	**Skaggs** (7–7)	—	41,447	42–42	L2
85	June 30	Athletics	3–12	Bassitt (5–3)	**Heaney** (1–2)	—	37,668	42–43	L3

July: 14–11 (Home: 7–7; Away: 7–4)

#	Date	Opponent	Score	Win	Loss	Save	Attendance	Record	Streak
–	July 1	@ Rangers	Postponed (passing away of P Tyler Skaggs) Makeup date: August 20						
86	July 2	@ Rangers	9–4	**Cahill** (3–6)	Fairbanks (0–2)	—	20,931	43–43	W1
87	July 3	@ Rangers	6–2	**Barría** (3–2	Jurado (5–4)	—	28,998	44–43	W2
88	July 4	@ Rangers	3–9	Lynn (11–4)	**Canning** (3–5)	—	45,566	44–44	L1
89	July 5	@ Astros	5–4	**Peña** (6–2)	Verlander (10–4)	**Robles** (12)	41,219	45–44	W1
90	July 6	@ Astros	0–4	Cole (9–5)	**Heaney** (1–3)	—	39,470	45–45	L1
91	July 7	@ Astros	10–11 (10)	Pressly (2–1)	**Cole** (0–1)	—	37,264	45–46	L2
ASG	July 9	NL @ AL	4–3	Tanaka (1–0)	Kershaw (0–1)	Chapman (1)	36,747	45–46	N/A
92	July 12	Mariners	13–0	**Peña** (7–2)	Leake (7–8)	—	43,140	46–46	W1
93	July 13	Mariners	9–2	**Harvey** (3–4)	LeBlanc (5–3)	—	41,549	47–46	W2
94	July 14	Mariners	6–3	**Buttrey** (5–4)	Bass (1–3)	**Robles** (13)	38,560	48–46	W3
95	July 15	Astros	9–6	**Anderson** (3–0)	Valdez (3–6)	**Robles** (14)	35,431	49–46	W4
96	July 16	Astros	7–2	**Ramirez** (4–1)	Rondón (3–2)	—	42,678	50–46	W5
97	July 17	Astros	2–11	Cole (10–5)	**Peña** (7–3)	—	35.738	50–47	L1
98	July 18	Astros	2–6	Miley (8–4)	**Harvey** (3–5)	—	35,928	50–48	L2
99	July 19	@ Mariners	0–10	Leake (8–8)	**Barría** (3–3)	—	19,976	50–49	L3
100	July 20	@ Mariners	6–2	**Buttrey** (6–4)	Elías (2–2)	—	30,927	51–49	W1
101	July 21	@ Mariners	9–3	**Peters** (2–0)	Kikuchi (4–7)	—	24,767	52–49	W2
102	July 23	@ Dodgers	5–4	**Peña** (8–3)	Maeda (7–7)	**Robles** (15)	53,725	53–49	W3
103	July 24	@ Dodgers	3–2	**Barría** (4–3)	Stripling (4–4)	**Robles** (16)	53,731	54–49	W4
104	July 25	Orioles	8–10 (16)	Scott (1-0)	**Canning** (3–6)	Wilkerson (1)	36,214	54–50	L1
105	July 26	Orioles	3–9	Wojciechowski (2–3)	**Tropeano** (0–1)	—	38,852	54–51	L2
106	July 27	Orioles	7–8	Bleier (2–0)	**Buttrey** (6–5)	Givens (9)	42,289	54–52	L3
107	July 28	Orioles	5–4	**Cole** (1–1)	Givens (1–5)	—	35,447	55–52	W1
108	July 29	Tigers	2–7	Zimmermann (1–8)	**Barría** (4–4)	—	35,457	55–53	L1
109	July 30	Tigers	6–1	**Canning** (4–6)	VerHagen (1–2)	—	33,907	56–53	W1
110	July 31	Tigers	1–9	Norris (3–8)	**Suárez** (2–2)	—	37,511	56–54	L1

August: 9–18 (Home: 6–5; Away: 3–13)

#	Date	Opponent	Score	Win	Loss	Save	Attendance	Record	Streak
111	August 2	@ Indians	3–7	Clevinger (6–2)	**Cole** (1–2)	—	28,386	56–55	L2
112	August 3	@ Indians	2–7	Plutko (4–2)	**Cahill** (3–7)	—	31,222	56–56	L3
113	August 4	@ Indians	2–6	Bieber (10–4)	**Barria** (4–5)	—	26,099	56–57	L4
114	August 5	@ Reds	4–7	Castillo (11–4)	**Cole** (1–3)	Iglesias (22)	21,895	56–58	L5
115	August 6	@ Reds	4–8	DeSclafani (7–6)	**Suárez** (2–3)	—	19,288	56–59	L6
116	August 8	@ Red Sox	0–3	Sale (6–11)	**Peters** (2–1)	Workman (7)	34,744	56–60	L7
117	August 9	@ Red Sox	4–16	Walden (7–1)	**Barría** (4–6)	—	36,650	56–61	L8
118	August 10	@ Red Sox	12–4	**Cole** (2–3)	Porcello (10–9)	—	36,390	57–61	W1
119	August 11	@ Red Sox	5–4 (10)	**Robles** (4–0)	Weber (1–2)	—	36,709	58–61	W2
120	August 12	Pirates	2–10	Keller (1–1)	**Suárez** (2–4)	—	33,527	58–62	L1
121	August 13	Pirates	7–10	Williams (5–5)	**Cole** (2–4)	Vázquez (22)	33,568	58–63	L2
122	August 14	Pirates	7–4	**Peters** (3–1)	Archer (3–9)	—	33,542	59–63	W1
123	August 15	White Sox	8–7	**Heaney** (2–3)	López (7–10)	**Robles** (17)	33,533	60–63	W2
124	August 16	White Sox	2–7	Giolito (13–6)	**Sandoval** (0–1)	—	39,206	60–64	L1
125	August 17	White Sox	6–5	**Cole** (3–4)	Marshall (3–2)	**Robles** (18)	39,419	61–64	W1
126	August 18	White Sox	9–2	**Canning** (5–6)	Cease (2–6)	—	35,436	62–64	W2
127	August 19	@ Rangers	7–8 (11)	Montero (2–0)	**Ramirez** (4–2)	—	17,326	62–65	L1
128	August 20 (1)	@ Rangers	5–1	**Heaney** (3–3)	Palumbo (0–2)	—	17,429	63–65	W1
129	August 20 (2)	@ Rangers	2–3 (11)	Clase (1–2)	**Buttrey** (6–6)	—	15,638	63–66	L1
130	August 21	@ Rangers	7–8	Hernández (1–0)	**Cahill** (3–8)	—	19,565	63–67	L2
131	August 23	@ Astros	4–5	Greinke (14–4)	**Suárez** (2–5)	Osuna (31)	35,201	63–68	L3
132	August 24	@ Astros	2–5	Miley (13–4)	**Peters** (3–2)	Harris (1)	37,862	63–69	L4
133	August 25	@ Astros	2–11	Valdez (4–6)	**Barría** (4–7)	—	38,989	63–70	L5
134	August 27	Rangers	5–2	**Del Pozo** (1–0)	Minor (11–8)	**Robles** (19)	39,008	64–70	W1
135	August 28	Rangers	0–3	Jurado (7–10)	**Del Pozo** (1–1)	Leclerc (9)	37,535	64–71	L1
136	August 30	Red Sox	6–7 (15)	Cashner (11–7)	**Cahill** (3–9)	—	39,788	64–72	L2
137	August 31	Red Sox	10–4	**García** (2–1)	Brasier (2–4)	—	43,036	65–72	W1

September: 7–18 (Home: 3–9; Away: 4–9)

#	Date	Opponent	Score	Win	Loss	Save	Attendance	Record	Streak
138	September 1	Red Sox	3–4	Weber (2–2)	**Heaney** (3–4)	Workman (10)	39,382	65–73	L1
139	September 3	@ Athletics	5–7	Petit (5–3)	**Ramirez** (4–3)	Hendriks (18)	14,031	65–74	L2
140	September 4	@ Athletics	0–4	Roark (9–8)	**Sandoval** (0–2)	—	12,597	65–75	L3
141	September 5	@ Athletics	6–10	Puk (1–0)	**Buttrey** (6–7)	—	14,013	65–76	L4
142	September 6	@ White Sox	5–4	**Robles** (5–0)	Colomé (4–3)	—	20,026	66–76	W1
143	September 7	@ White Sox	8–7	**Heaney** (4–4)	Covey (1–8)	**Robles** (20)	25,230	67–76	W2
144	September 8	@ White Sox	1–5	Osich (2–0)	**Barría** (4–8)	—	22,681	67–77	L1
145	September 9	Indians	2–6	Bieber (14–7)	**Sandoval** (0–3)	—	35,753	67–78	L2
146	September 10	Indians	0–8	Plesac (8–6)	**Suárez** (2–6)	—	35,508	67–79	L3
147	September 11	Indians	3–4	Carrasco (5–7)	**Peters** (3–3)	Cimber (1)	33,952	67–80	L4
148	September 13	Rays	4–11	Morton (15–6)	**Heaney** (4–5)	—	39,914	67–81	L5
149	September 14	Rays	1–3	Richards (6–12)	**Barría** (4–9)	Pagán (20)	39,056	67–82	L6
150	September 15	Rays	6–4	**Ramirez** (5–3)	Yarbrough (11–4)	**Robles** (21)	36,709	68–82	W1
151	September 17	@ Yankees	0–8	Loáisiga (2–1)	**Ramirez** (5–4)	—	41,026	68–83	L1
152	September 18	@ Yankees	3–2	**Bard** (2–2)	Ottavino (6–5)	**Robles** (22)	38,106	69–83	W1
153	September 19	@ Yankees	1–9	Tanaka (11–8)	**Heaney** (4–6)	—	42,056	69–84	L1
154	September 20	@ Astros	4–6	Greinke (17–5)	**Barría** (4–10)	Osuna (36)	40,106	69–85	L2
155	September 21	@ Astros	8–4	**Bard** (3–2)	Miley (14–6)	—	43,264	70–85	W1
156	September 22	@ Astros	5–13	Verlander (20–6)	**Rodríguez** (0–1)	—	43,169	70–86	L1
157	September 24	Athletics	3–2	**Peters** (4–3)	Bailey (13–9)	**Robles** (23)	34,505	71–86	W1
158	September 25	Athletics	2–3	Soria (2–4)	**Robles** (5–1)	Hendriks (24)	36,865	71–87	L1
159	September 26	Astros	4–3 (12)	**Cahill** (4–9)	Biagini (3–2)	—	39,658	72–87	W1
160	September 27	Astros	0–4	Urquidy (2–1)	**Sandoval** (0–4)	—	41,763	72–88	L1
161	September 28	Astros	3–6	Verlander (21–6)	**Bard** (3–3)	Osuna (38)	35,814	72–89	L2
162	September 29	Astros	5–8	Cole (20–5)	**Peters** (4–4)	Harris (4)	34,693	72–90	L3

Legend: = Win = Loss = Postponement
Bold = Angels team member

=== Record against opponents ===
2019 American League record Source: MLB Standings Grid – 2019
Team	BAL	BOS	CWS	CLE	DET	HOU	KC	LAA	MIN	NYY	OAK	SEA	TB	TEX	TOR	NL
Baltimore	—	7–12	3–3	3–4	3–4	2–4	3–3	4–3	0–6	2–17	1–6	3–4	7–12	1–6	8–11	7–13
Boston	12–7	—	5–2	3–3	5–2	2–4	5–1	4–3	3–3	5–14	4–3	4–3	7–12	4–3	11–8	10–10
Chicago	3–3	2–5	—	11–8	12–6	4–3	9–10	2–5	6–13	4–3	1–5	2–4	2–4	4–3	4–3	6–14
Cleveland	4–3	3–3	8–11	—	18–1	3–4	12–7	6–0	10–9	4–3	1–5	5–1	1–6	4–3	6–1	8–12
Detroit	4–3	2–5	6–12	1–18	—	1–6	10–9	3–3	5–14	3–3	1–6	1–6	2–4	0–6	3–4	5–15
Houston	4–2	4–2	3–4	4–3	6–1	—	5–1	14–5	3–4	4–3	11–8	18–1	3–4	13–6	4–2	11–9
Kansas City	3–3	1–5	10–9	7–12	9–10	1–5	—	2–4	5–14	2–5	2–5	2–5	3–4	2–5	1–6	9–11
Los Angeles	3–4	3–4	5–2	0–6	3–3	5–14	4–2	—	1–5	2–5	6–13	10–9	3–4	9–10	6–1	12–8
Minnesota	6–0	3–3	13–6	9–10	14–5	4–3	14–5	5–1	—	2–4	3–4	5–2	5–2	6–1	4–3	8–12
New York	17–2	14–5	3–4	3–4	3–3	3–4	5–2	5–2	4–2	—	2–4	6–1	12–7	3–3	11–8	12–8
Oakland	6–1	3–4	5–1	5–1	6–1	8–11	5–2	13–6	4–3	4–2	—	10–9	4–3	13–6	0–6	11–9
Seattle	4–3	3–4	4–2	1–5	6–1	1–18	5–2	9–10	2–5	1–6	9–10	—	2–4	8–11	4–2	9–11
Tampa Bay	12–7	12–7	4–2	6–1	4–2	4–3	4–3	4–3	2–5	7–12	3–4	4–2	—	3–3	13–6	14–6
Texas	6–1	3–4	3–4	3–4	6–0	6–13	5–2	10–9	1–6	3–3	6–13	11–8	3–3	—	3–3	9–11
Toronto	11–8	8–11	3–4	1–6	4–3	2–4	6–1	1–6	3–4	8–11	6–0	2–4	6–13	3–3	—	3–17

== Roster ==
2019 Los Angeles Angels
Roster
Pitchers: 37 Cody Allen; 38 Justin Anderson; 39 Luke Bard; 51 Jaime Barría; 32 Cam Bedrosian; 31 Ty Buttrey; 53 Trevor Cahill; 47 Griffin Canning; 67 Taylor Cole; 43 John Curtiss; 58 Miguel Del Pozo; 61 Sam Freeman; 40 Luis García; 33 Matt Harvey; 38,28 Andrew Heaney; 65 Jake Jewell; 49 Adalberto Mejía; 99 Keynan Middleton; 64 Félix Peña; 52 Dillon Peters; 66 J. C. Ramírez; 24 Noe Ramirez; 60 Matt Ramsey; 57 Hansel Robles; 63 José Rodríguez; 43 Patrick Sandoval; 45 Tyler Skaggs †; 36 Chris Stratton; 54 José Suárez; 35 Nick Tropeano	Catchers: 48 Anthony Bemboom; 13 Dustin Garneau; 20 Jonathan Lucroy; 44 Kevan Smith; 33 Max Stassi; Infielders: 41 Justin Bour; 7 Zack Cozart; 22 Kaleb Cowart; 6 David Fletcher; 9 Tommy La Stella; 5 Albert Pujols; 4 Luis Rengifo; 2 Andrelton Simmons; 23 Matt Thaiss; 19 Wilfredo Tovar; 25 Jared Walsh; 20 Kean Wong	Outfielders: 25 Peter Bourjos; 22,56 Kole Calhoun; 18 Brian Goodwin; 21 Michael Hermosillo; 16 Jarrett Parker; 48 César Puello; 27 Mike Trout; 8 Justin Upton; 3 Taylor Ward; Other batters: 17 Shohei Ohtani	Manager: 12 Brad Ausmus; Coaches: 68 Andrew Bailey (bullpen); 92 Manny Del Campo (bullpen catcher); 62 Jesús Feliciano (first base); 86 Mike Gallego (third base); 93 Justin Hatcher (bullpen catcher); 80 Matt Martin (coaching assistant); 82 José Molina (catching); 77 Jeremy Reed (hitting); 88 Josh Paul (bench); 55 Paul Sorrento (hitting instructor); 74 Doug White (pitching); 76 Shawn Wooten (assistant hitting)

== Player stats ==
=== Batting ===
Note: G = Games played; AB = At bats; R = Runs; H = Hits; 2B = Doubles; 3B = Triples; HR = Home runs; RBI = Runs batted in; SB = Stolen bases; BB = Walks; AVG = Batting average; SLG = Slugging average

Player	G	AB	R	H	2B	3B	HR	RBI	SB	BB	AVG	SLG
David Fletcher	154	596	83	173	30	4	6	49	8	55	.290	.384
Kole Calhoun	152	552	92	128	29	1	33	74	4	70	.232	.467
Albert Pujols	131	491	55	120	22	0	23	93	3	43	.244	.430
Mike Trout	134	470	110	137	27	2	45	104	11	110	.291	.645
Brian Goodwin	136	413	65	108	29	3	17	47	7	38	.262	.470
Andrelton Simmons	103	398	47	105	19	0	7	40	10	24	.264	.364
Shohei Ohtani	106	384	51	110	20	5	18	62	12	33	.286	.505
Luis Rengifo	108	357	44	85	18	3	7	33	2	40	.238	.364
Tommy La Stella	80	292	49	86	8	0	16	44	0	20	.295	.486
Jonathan Lucroy	74	240	28	58	8	1	7	30	0	21	.242	.371
Justin Upton	63	219	34	47	8	0	12	40	1	32	.215	.416
Kevan Smith	67	191	21	48	12	0	5	20	2	16	.251	.393
Justin Bour	52	151	18	26	5	0	8	26	0	17	.172	.364
Matt Thaiss	53	147	17	31	7	0	8	23	0	17	.211	.422
Zack Cozart	38	97	4	12	2	0	0	7	0	5	.124	.144
Wilfredo Tovar	31	83	5	16	5	0	0	5	0	5	.193	.253
Jared Walsh	31	79	6	16	5	1	1	5	0	6	.203	.329
Dustin Garneau	28	69	11	16	3	0	2	7	0	8	.232	.362
Anthony Bemboom	22	49	2	5	0	0	1	3	0	1	.102	.163
Peter Bourjos	26	44	4	4	1	0	0	2	2	1	.091	.114
Max Stassi	20	42	3	3	0	0	0	2	0	5	.071	.071
Taylor Ward	20	42	4	8	3	0	1	2	0	6	.190	.333
César Puello	12	41	6	16	3	0	3	12	0	3	.390	.683
Michael Hermosillo	18	36	7	5	1	1	0	3	2	5	.139	.222
Kaleb Cowart	9	25	1	4	3	0	0	1	1	1	.160	.280
Jarrett Parker	5	12	1	0	0	0	0	0	0	3	.000	.000
Kean Wong	1	4	1	0	0	0	0	0	0	0	.000	.000
Pitcher totals	162	18	0	1	0	0	0	0	0	1	.056	.056
Team totals	162	5542	769	1368	268	21	220	734	65	586	.247	.422

=== Pitching ===
Note: W = Wins; L = Losses; ERA = Earned run average; G = Games pitched; GS = Games started; SV = Saves; IP = Innings pitched; H = Hits allowed; R = Runs allowed; ER = Earned runs allowed; BB = Walks allowed; SO = Strikeouts

Player	W	L	ERA	G	GS	SV	IP	H	R	ER	BB	SO
Trevor Cahill	4	9	5.98	37	11	0	102.1	111	71	68	39	81
Félix Peña	8	3	4.58	22	7	0	96.1	80	56	49	34	101
Andrew Heaney	4	6	4.91	18	18	0	95.1	93	53	52	30	118
Griffin Canning	5	6	4.58	18	17	0	90.1	80	46	46	30	96
Jaime Barría	4	10	6.42	19	13	0	82.2	92	61	59	27	75
José Suárez	2	6	7.11	19	15	0	81.0	100	67	64	33	72
Tyler Skaggs	7	7	4.29	15	15	0	79.2	73	41	38	28	78
Hansel Robles	5	1	2.48	71	1	23	72.2	58	20	20	16	75
Ty Buttrey	6	7	3.98	72	0	2	72.1	69	34	32	23	84
Dillon Peters	4	4	5.38	17	12	0	72.0	85	50	43	26	55
Noé Ramirez	5	4	3.99	51	7	0	67.2	59	30	30	20	79
Luis García	2	1	4.35	64	2	1	62.0	61	35	30	33	57
Cam Bedrosian	3	3	3.23	59	7	1	61.1	48	30	22	22	64
Matt Harvey	3	5	7.09	12	12	0	59.2	63	48	47	29	39
Taylor Cole	3	4	5.92	38	6	0	51.2	58	35	34	24	50
Luke Bard	3	3	4.78	32	3	0	49.0	41	27	26	13	40
Justin Anderson	3	0	5.55	54	0	1	47.0	42	32	29	32	60
Patrick Sandoval	0	4	5.03	10	9	0	39.1	35	22	22	19	42
Chris Stratton	0	2	8.59	7	5	0	29.1	43	28	28	18	22
Jake Jewell	0	0	6.84	18	0	0	26.1	28	20	20	8	23
Cody Allen	0	2	6.26	25	0	4	23.0	24	16	16	20	29
José Rodríguez	0	1	2.75	9	1	0	19.2	17	6	6	11	13
Nick Tropeano	0	1	9.88	3	1	0	13.2	18	15	15	6	10
Adalberto Mejía	0	0	3.46	20	0	0	13.0	9	6	5	8	13
Miguel Del Pozo	1	1	10.61	17	0	0	9.1	10	11	11	8	11
J. C. Ramírez	0	0	4.50	5	0	0	8.0	8	4	4	1	4
Keynan Middleton	0	0	1.17	11	0	0	7.2	4	1	1	7	6
Jared Walsh	0	0	1.80	5	0	0	5.0	3	1	1	6	5
John Curtiss	0	0	3.86	1	0	0	2.1	2	1	1	3	1
Sam Freeman	0	0	4.50	1	0	0	2.0	3	1	1	2	0
Matt Ramsey	0	0	0.00	1	0	0	1.0	0	0	0	0	1
Team totals	72	90	5.12	162	162	32	1442.2	1417	868	820	576	1404

== Farm system ==
Level	Team	League	Manager
AAA	Salt Lake Bees	Pacific Coast League	
AA	Mobile BayBears	Southern League	
A-Advanced	Inland Empire 66ers	California League	
A	Burlington Bees	Midwest League	
Rookie	Orem Owlz	Pioneer League	
Rookie	AZL Angels	Arizona League	
Rookie	DSL Angels	Dominican Summer League	

All coaches and rosters can be found on each team's website.

== See also ==
- Los Angeles Angels
- Angel Stadium

Records
Preceded by 2018	Los Angeles Angels seasons 2019	Succeeded by 2020
