= Félix Peña =

Dominican baseball player (born 1990)

CTBC Brothers – No. 34
- Pitcher
- Born: February 25, 1990 (age 36); San Pedro de Macorís, Dominican Republic
- Bats: Right Throws: Right

Professional debut
- MLB: August 19, 2016, for the Chicago Cubs
- KBO: July 3, 2022, for the Hanwha Eagles
- CPBL: April 19, 2025, for the Uni-President Lions

MLB statistics (through 2021 season)
- Win–loss record: 15–8
- Earned run average: 4.66
- Strikeouts: 267

KBO statistics (through 2024 season)
- Win–loss record: 19–20
- Earned run average: 3.98
- Strikeouts: 248

CPBL statistics (through August 28, 2026)
- Win–loss record: 10–7
- Earned run average: 2.57
- Strikeouts: 134
- Stats at Baseball Reference

Teams
- Chicago Cubs (2016–2017); Los Angeles Angels (2018–2021); Hanwha Eagles (2022–2024); Uni-President Lions (2025); CTBC Brothers (2026–present)

Career highlights and awards
- Pitched a combined no-hitter on July 12, 2019

Félix Ricardo Peña (born February 25, 1990) is a Dominican professional baseball pitcher for the CTBC Brothers of the Chinese Professional Baseball League (CPBL). He has previously played in Major League Baseball (MLB) for the Chicago Cubs and Los Angeles Angels, in the KBO League for the Hanwha Eagles, and in the CPBL for the Uni-President Lions. He made his MLB debut in 2016.

== Career ==
=== Chicago Cubs ===
On March 9, 2009, Peña signed with the Chicago Cubs as an international free agent. He made his professional debut with the DSL Cubs. He spent the 2010 season with the DSL Cubs as well, recording a 1.17 ERA in 20 appearances. He spent the 2011 season with the rookie ball AZL Cubs, pitching to a 3–2 record and 6.92 ERA. He split 2012 between the Single-A Peoria Chiefs and the Low-A Boise Hawks, accumulating a 4–2 record and 3.58 ERA between the two teams. In 2013, he played for the Single-A Kane County Cougars, pitching to a 4–7 record and 3.92 ERA with 77 strikeouts in 103.1 innings of work. He split the next year between the High-A Daytona Cubs and the Double-A Tennessee Smokies, registering a 6–10 record and 4.15 ERA across 25 appearances. He spent the 2015 season with Tennessee, recording a 7–8 record and 3.75 ERA in 129.2 innings pitched. He was assigned to the Triple-A Iowa Cubs to begin the 2016 season.

After recording a 3.41 ERA in 36 games in Iowa, Peña was called selected to the 40-man roster and promoted to the major leagues for the first time on August 19, 2016. He made his debut that day, pitching a scoreless innings and notching his first major league strikeout, punching out Daniel Descalso of the Colorado Rockies. In 11 Major League games to finish the 2016 season, Peña sported a 4.00 ERA. The Cubs would eventually make it to the playoffs and win the World Series. Peña did not participate in the postseason, but was on the 40-man roster at the time the Cubs won, earning him his first World Series ring.

Peña split the 2017 season between the major league club and Triple-A Iowa, pitching to a 5.24 ERA in 25 appearances in the majors. On October 4, 2017, Peña was designated for assignment by the Cubs following the waiver claim of Luke Farrell.

=== Los Angeles Angels ===
On October 9, 2017, Peña was traded to the Los Angeles Angels in exchange for a player to be named later. He began the 2018 season in Triple-A before being called up on June 18. He remained in the Angels rotation for the remainder of the season. He was 3–5 with a 4.18 ERA, and 85 strikeouts in 92 2/3 innings.

On July 12, 2019, Peña pitched seven no-hit innings, helping the Angels throw a combined no-hitter against the Seattle Mariners. On August 3, Peña was removed from a game with what was originally diagnosed as a right knee sprain. The next day, it was announced that he had torn his right ACL, ending his season. He had recorded an 8–3 record and 4.58 ERA in 22 games. In 2020, he spent the season pitching out of the bullpen, appearing in 25 games. He registered an ERA of 4.05 in 26 2/3 innings.

Peña recorded a ghastly 37.80 ERA in 2 appearances in 2021 for the Angels before being outrighted off of the 40-man roster on May 11, 2021. After clearing waivers, he was assigned to the Triple-A Salt Lake Bees. With Salt Lake, Peña made 31 appearances, going 5–4 with an 8.03 ERA and 59 strikeouts. On September 24, 2021, Peña was released by the Angels.

=== New York Mets ===
On February 25, 2022, Peña signed a minor league contract with the New York Mets. He made eight appearances (including six starts) for the Triple–A Syracuse Mets, logging a 1–5 record and 4.06 ERA with 26 strikeouts over 31 innings of work. Peña was released by the Mets organization on June 7.

=== Hanwha Eagles ===
On June 10, 2022, Peña signed with the Hanwha Eagles of the KBO League. In 13 starts for Hanwha, he posted a 5–4 record and 3.72 ERA with 72 strikeouts in 67 2/3 innings of work.

On December 13, 2022, Peña re–signed with the Eagles for the 2023 season. He made 32 starts for Hanwha, he pitched to an 11–11 record and 3.60 ERA with 147 strikeouts across 177 1/3 innings pitched.

On December 9, 2023, Pena again re-signed with the Eagles on a one–year, $850,000 contract. He made 9 starts for Hanwha in 2024, compiling a 3–5 record and 6.27 ERA with 29 strikeouts across 37 1/3 innings pitched. On May 28, 2024, Peña was released by the Eagles following the acquisition of Jaime Barría.

=== Uni-President Lions ===
On January 18, 2025, Peña signed with the Leones de Yucatán of the Mexican League. However, on February 2, Peña signed with the Uni-President Lions of the Chinese Professional Baseball League. He made 21 starts for the Lions, compiling a 10–3 record and 1.91 ERA with 95 strikeouts across 127 1/3 innings pitched. Peña became a free agent following the season.

=== CTBC Brothers ===
On February 11, 2026, Peña signed with the Leones de Yucatán of the Mexican League. However, on April 22, Peña signed with the CTBC Brothers of the Chinese Professional Baseball League.

Awards and achievements
Preceded by Mike Fiers	No-hit game July 12, 2019 (with Taylor Cole)	Succeeded by Aaron Sanchez, Will Harris, Joe Biagini, Chris Devenski
