= Chris Devenski =

American baseball player (born 1990)

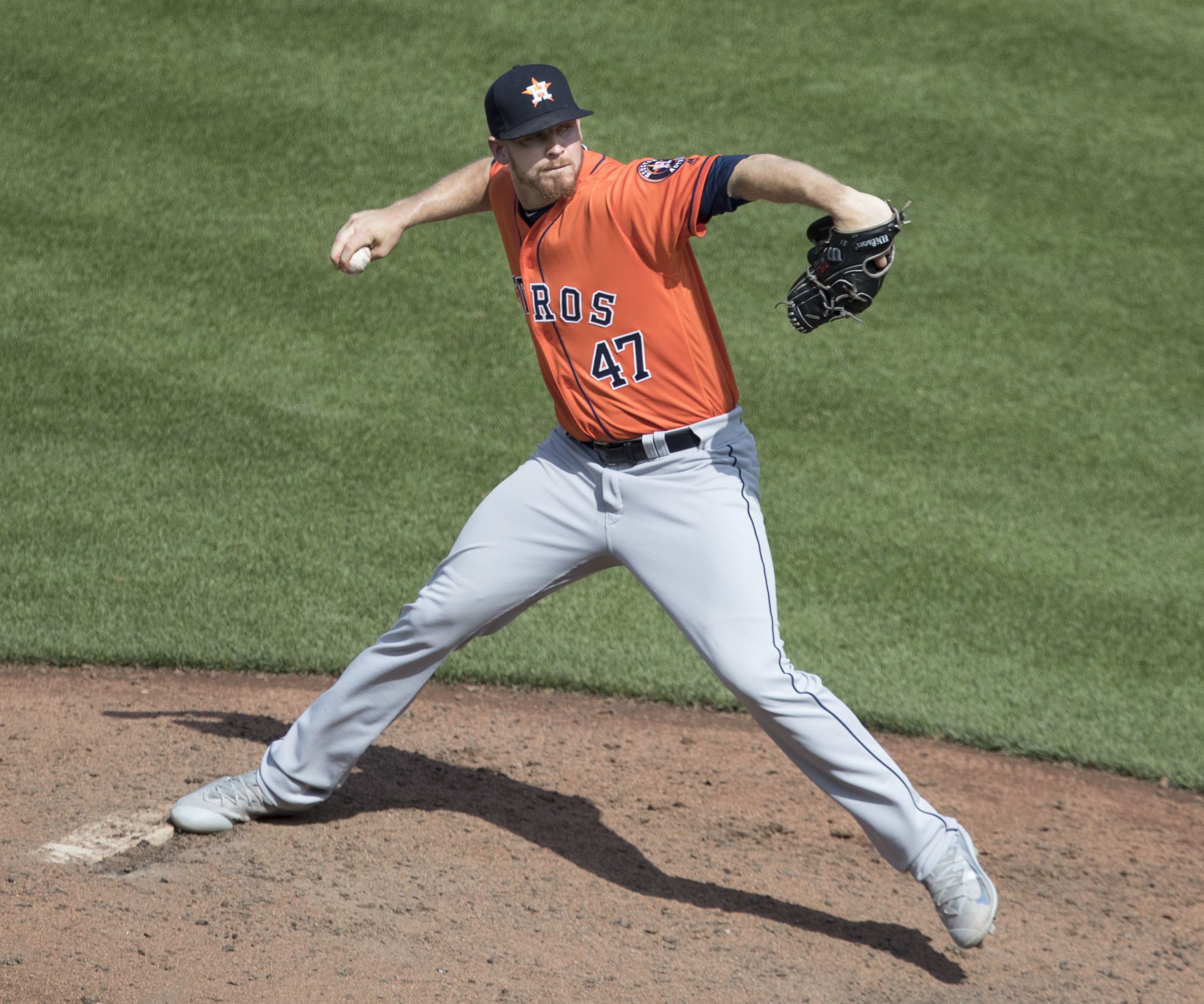
- Devenski with the Houston Astros in 2017

Free agent
- Pitcher
- Born: November 13, 1990 (age 36); Cerritos, California, U.S.
- Bats: Right Throws: Right

MLB debut
- April 8, 2016, for the Houston Astros

MLB statistics (through 2026 season)
- Win–loss record: 27–22
- Earned run average: 4.05
- Strikeouts: 434
- Stats at Baseball Reference

Teams
- Houston Astros (2016–2020); Arizona Diamondbacks (2021–2022); Philadelphia Phillies (2022); Los Angeles Angels (2023); Tampa Bay Rays (2023–2024); New York Mets (2025); Pittsburgh Pirates (2026); New York Mets (2026)

Career highlights and awards
- World Series champion (2017); All-Star (2017); Pitched a combined no-hitter (August 3, 2019)

Christopher Michael Devenski (born November 13, 1990), also known as "Devo", is an American professional baseball pitcher who is a free agent. He has previously played in Major League Baseball (MLB) for the Houston Astros, Arizona Diamondbacks, Philadelphia Phillies, Los Angeles Angels, Tampa Bay Rays, New York Mets, and Pittsburgh Pirates. He made his MLB debut in 2016.

Prior to playing professionally, Devenski played college baseball for Golden West College and California State University, Fullerton. The Chicago White Sox selected Devenski in the 25th round, with the 771st overall selection, of the 2011 MLB draft. He was named an MLB All-Star in 2017.

== Amateur career ==
Devenski attended Gahr High School in Cerritos, California. He played for the school's baseball team as both a pitcher and a shortstop. He graduated in 2008, and enrolled at Golden West College, where he played college baseball in his freshman year as a pitcher and shortstop. Devenski transferred to California State University, Fullerton, where he continued his college baseball career with the Cal State Fullerton Titans. The Titans' coaches convinced him to focus on pitching, and he accrued 182 2/3 innings pitched over 104 games in two seasons with the school. He also played collegiate summer baseball for the Woodstock River Bandits of the Valley Baseball League in 2011.

== Professional career ==
=== Chicago White Sox ===
The Chicago White Sox selected Devenski in the 25th round, with the 771st overall selection, of the 2011 Major League Baseball draft. He made his professional debut with the Great Falls Voyagers of the rookie-level Pioneer League. He started the 2012 season with the Kannapolis Intimidators of the Single-A South Atlantic League.

=== Houston Astros ===
On August 3, 2012, Devenski was traded to the Houston Astros as the player to be named later in an earlier trade where the White Sox acquired Brett Myers. The Astros had already acquired minor leaguers Blair Walters and Matt Heidenreich in the trade. He had a 6–5 win–loss record (W–L) and a 4.23 earned run average (ERA) in 19 games started for Kannapolis before the trade. The Astros assigned him to the Lexington Legends of the Single–A Midwest League. On August 31, in his fifth start for Lexington, he threw a no-hitter with 16 strikeouts.

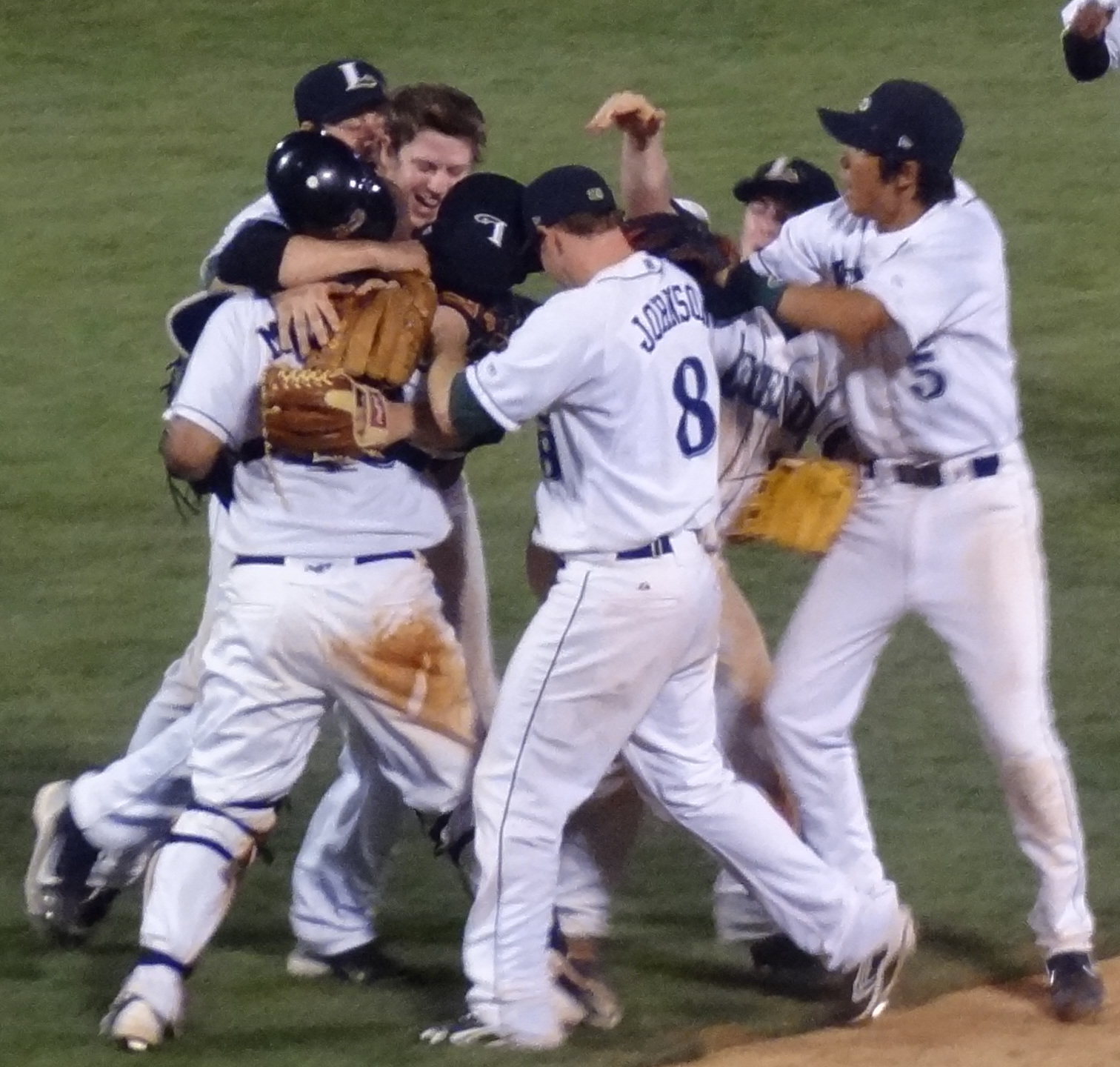
Devenski and Lexington Legends teammates celebrate after the final out of his no-hitter in 2012.

Devenski began the 2013 season with the Lancaster JetHawks of the High-A California League. He struggled with Lancaster, working to a 7.88 ERA in 75 1/3 innings pitched, and was demoted to the Quad Cities River Bandits of the Single-A Midwest League. Devenski started the 2014 season with Lancaster and received another midseason promotion, this time to the Corpus Christi Hooks of the Double-A Texas League. He pitched for Corpus Christi in 2015, finishing the season with a 3.01 ERA in 119 2/3 innings pitched. Devenski was named their Pitcher of the Year. He was promoted to the Fresno Grizzlies of the Triple-A Pacific Coast League for the playoffs and pitched seven one-hit innings to help Fresno win the Triple-A National Championship Game. He was named the most valuable player of the championship game. Eligible in the Rule 5 draft after the 2015 season, the Astros did not protect Devenski on their 40-man roster, but Devenski was not selected.

The Astros assigned Devenski to Fresno for Opening Day of the 2016 season, but promoted him to the major leagues on April 6. He made his MLB debut on April 8. Devenski finished the 2016 season with a 2.16 ERA and 0.914 walks plus hits per inning pitched ratio in 48 appearances. Devenski became the twelfth rookie reliever in the major leagues and first Astro to register each of 100 innings pitched, 100 strikeouts, and sub-3.00 earned run average (ERA). He succeeded Pedro Martinez in 1993 as the most recent.

Devenski continued to pitch for the Astros as a multi-inning relief pitcher in 2017. He was named to the American League's (AL) roster for the MLB All-Star Game on July 7. As of that day, he had a 2.09 ERA in 51 2/3 innings pitched, and led all major league relief pitchers in innings pitched, in strikeouts with 72, and tied for the most wins, with 6. He finished the regular season with an 8–5 win–loss record, a 2.68 ERA, and 100 strikeouts with 26 walks in 80 2/3 innings pitched. Devenski appeared in five games of the World Series, pitching a total of five innings while allowing four hits and four runs, although he was the winning pitcher of Game 2. Devenski was the first pitcher in Astros' history to win a World Series game.

Devenski and the Astros agreed to a $1.525 million salary for the 2019 season. On August 3, 2019, Devenski worked the ninth inning in a combined no-hitter of the Seattle Mariners; the game was started by Aaron Sanchez, Will Harris, and Joe Biagini preceded Devenski in relief. The final score was 9–0. However, he struggled throughout the season, setting a career high 4.83 ERA in 61 games.

On September 15, 2020, Devenski underwent arthroscopic surgery to remove a bone spur from his right elbow and missed the rest of the 2020 season. At the time of the surgery, he had allowed 6 earned runs across 3 2/3 frames.

=== Arizona Diamondbacks ===
On January 20, 2021, Devenski signed a minor league contract with the Arizona Diamondbacks organization. On March 29, he was selected to the 40-man roster. On May 15, Devenski was placed on the 60-day injured list with a sprained right UCL. On June 6, he underwent Tommy John surgery, officially ending his 2021 season. He registered an 8.59 ERA in 8 games for Arizona in 2021. On October 8, Devenski elected free agency. On October 25, Devenski re-signed with the Diamondbacks on a minor league contract.

Devenski returned to action rehabbing with the Arizona Complex League Diamondbacks, before later being elevated to the Triple-A Reno Aces, where he logged a 7.36 ERA across 6 appearances. On July 26, 2022, Devenski's contract was selected to the major league roster. On August 26, Devenski was designated for assignment and became a free agent.

=== Philadelphia Phillies ===
On August 30, 2022, Devenski signed a minor league contract with the Philadelphia Phillies. He made 9 appearances for the Triple–A Lehigh Valley IronPigs, posting a strong 1.04 ERA with 11 strikeouts across 8 2/3 innings pitched. On September 25, Devenski's contract was selected to the major league roster. In three games for the Phillies, he struggled to a 11.25 ERA with three strikeouts across four innings of work.

=== Los Angeles Angels ===
On November 28, 2022, Devenski signed a minor league contract with the Los Angeles Angels. On March 25, 2023, it was announced that Devenski did not make the team's Opening Day roster. Devenski opted to remain with the Angels and report to the Triple-A Salt Lake Bees rather than exercising his opt-out clause. He made 7 appearances in Salt Lake, posting a 4.00 ERA with 9 strikeouts in as many innings pitched. On April 29, Devenski was selected to the active roster after José Quijada was placed on the injured list. In 29 appearances for the Angels, he recorded a 5.09 ERA with 33 strikeouts in 33 2/3 innings of work. After spending a month on the injured list with a right hamstring strain, Devenski was activated on August 25 and subsequently designated for assignment. On August 29, he was released.

=== Tampa Bay Rays ===
On August 29, 2023, Devenski signed a one-year, major league contract with the Tampa Bay Rays. In 9 games for the Rays, he compiled a 3–2 record and 2.08 ERA with 9 strikeouts across 8 2/3 innings pitched. Devenski became a free agent following the season and re-signed with the Rays on a new major league contract December 5, 2023.

He made 19 relief outings for the Rays in 2024, and struggled to a 6.75 ERA with 24 strikeouts across 26 2/3 innings of work. Devenski was designated for assignment on June 25, 2024. He was released by the Rays organization on June 30.

=== Seattle Mariners ===
On July 2, 2024, Devenski signed a major league contract with the Seattle Mariners. He was removed from the 40–man roster and sent outright to the Triple–A Tacoma Rainiers on July 30. In 23 appearances for Tacoma, Devenski logged a 2.35 ERA with 31 strikeouts and 3 saves over 23 innings pitched. He elected free agency on October 4.

=== New York Mets ===
On October 28, 2024, Devenski signed a minor league contract with the New York Mets. He began the 2025 season with the Triple-A Syracuse Mets, recording a 1.93 ERA with seven strikeouts and two saves in nine games. On April 30, 2025, the Mets selected Devenski's contract, adding him to their active roster. In 10 appearances for New York, he recorded a 2.38 ERA with nine strikeouts across 11 1/3 innings pitched. Devenski was designated for assignment by the Mets on July 22. He cleared waivers and elected free agency on July 27. On July 29, Devenski re-signed with New York on a major league contract. He made two scoreless outings for New York, recording five strikeouts across four innings of work. Devenski was designated for assignment by the Mets on September 21. He cleared waivers and was sent outright to Syracuse on September 25. Devenski elected free agency on October 1.

=== Pittsburgh Pirates ===
On January 8, 2026, Devenski signed a minor league contract with the Pittsburgh Pirates. He was assigned to the Triple-A Indianapolis Indians to begin the regular season. On April 29, the Pirates selected Devenski's contract, adding him to their active roster. He made three appearances for the Pirates, recording a 7.71 ERA with three strikeouts across 2 1/3 innings pitched. On May 7, Devenski was placed on the injured list due to an undisclosed injury; he was transferred to the 60-day injured list on June 7. Upon being activated on August 5, Devenski was removed from the 40–man roster and sent outright to Indianapolis; he subsequently rejected the assignment and elected free agency on August 8.

=== New York Mets (second stint) ===
On August 11, 2026, Devenski signed a minor league contract with the New York Mets. He had his contract selected to the major league roster on August 28. In six appearances for the Mets, he struggled to a 13.50 ERA with two strikeouts across 5 1/3 innings pitched. Devenski was designated for assignment by New York on September 11. He cleared waivers and was sent outright to the Triple–A Syracuse Mets on September 13. He elected free agency on November 2.

== Personal life ==
Devenski was raised in Santa Ana, California. His father, Mike, owns a moving company. Amanda, his twin sister, is a teacher. While he was attending college, his family moved to Artesia, California.

Devenski is often known to Astros fans by the nickname "Devo" after the new wave band of the 1980s.

== See also ==
- List of Houston Astros no-hitters
- List of Major League Baseball no-hitters
- List of California State University, Fullerton people

== Notes ==
Awards and achievements
Preceded by Taylor Cole, Félix Peña	No-hit game August 3, 2019 (with Sanchez, Harris & Biagini)	Succeeded by Justin Verlander
