= Sam Freeman (baseball) =

American baseball player (born 1987)

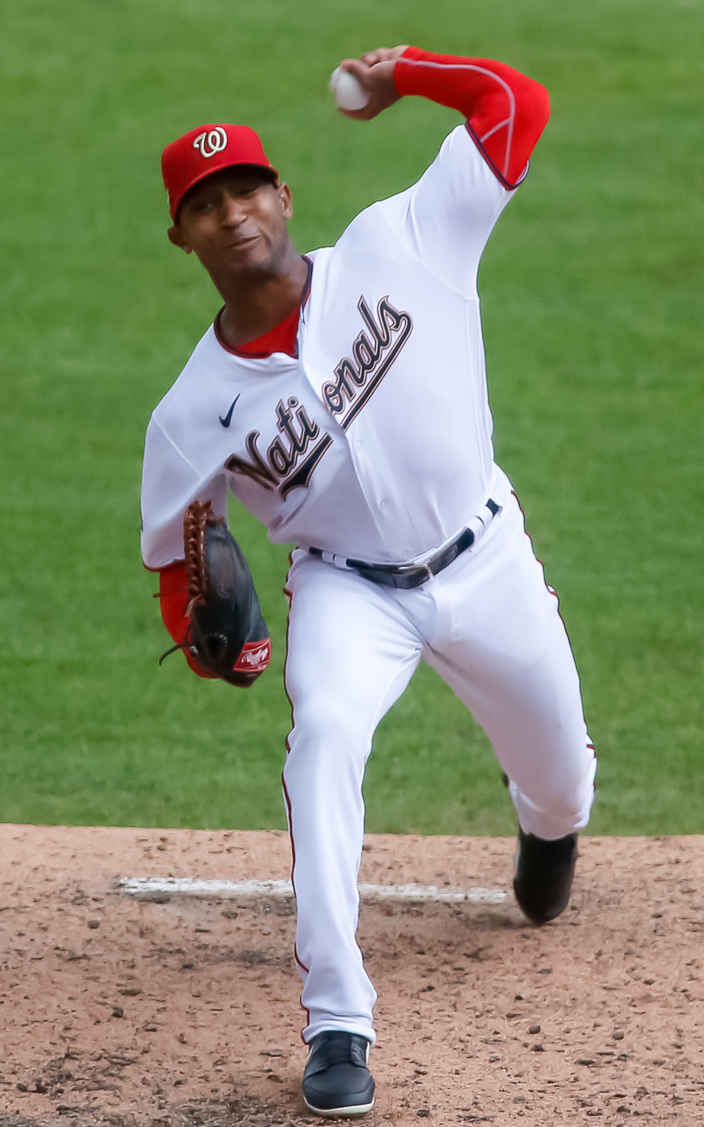
- Freeman with the Washington Nationals in 2020
- Pitcher
- Born: June 24, 1987 (age 39); Houston, Texas, U.S.
- Batted: Right Threw: Left

MLB debut
- June 1, 2012, for the St. Louis Cardinals

Last MLB appearance
- August 12, 2020, for the Washington Nationals

MLB statistics
- Win–loss record: 8–7
- Earned run average: 3.58
- Strikeouts: 232
- Stats at Baseball Reference

Teams
- St. Louis Cardinals (2012–2014); Texas Rangers (2015); Milwaukee Brewers (2016); Atlanta Braves (2017–2018); Los Angeles Angels (2019); Washington Nationals (2020)

Samuel Douglas Freeman (born June 24, 1987) is an American former professional baseball pitcher. He played in Major League Baseball (MLB) for the St. Louis Cardinals, Texas Rangers, Milwaukee Brewers, Atlanta Braves, Los Angeles Angels, and Washington Nationals.

== Early life ==
Freeman started playing baseball at the age of four in the Carrollton Little League in Carrollton, Texas. When he was 12 years old his team won the Carrollton Pony League Championship. Freeman's pitching career started his freshman year of high school, one year before making the varsity team at Hebron High School.

== College career ==
After graduating, Freeman was recruited to play for North Central Texas College (NCTC) where he played for 2 years. Then, Freeman signed with the University of Kansas.

== Professional career ==
=== St. Louis Cardinals ===
After his sophomore year of college, Freeman was selected by the St. Louis Cardinals in the 24th round of the 2007 Major League Baseball draft. He didn't sign and went on to Kansas for his junior year. After his junior year, he was redrafted by the Cardinals in the 32nd round in the 2008 Major League Baseball draft. With the Cardinals, he rose from the Rookie League to Double–A in three years. He was 0-2 with a 4.50 ERA in Triple–A with the Memphis Redbirds. and was later signed to the Cardinals 40-man roster.

Freeman sustained an injury to his elbow requiring Tommy John surgery, which took him out of the 2010 season.

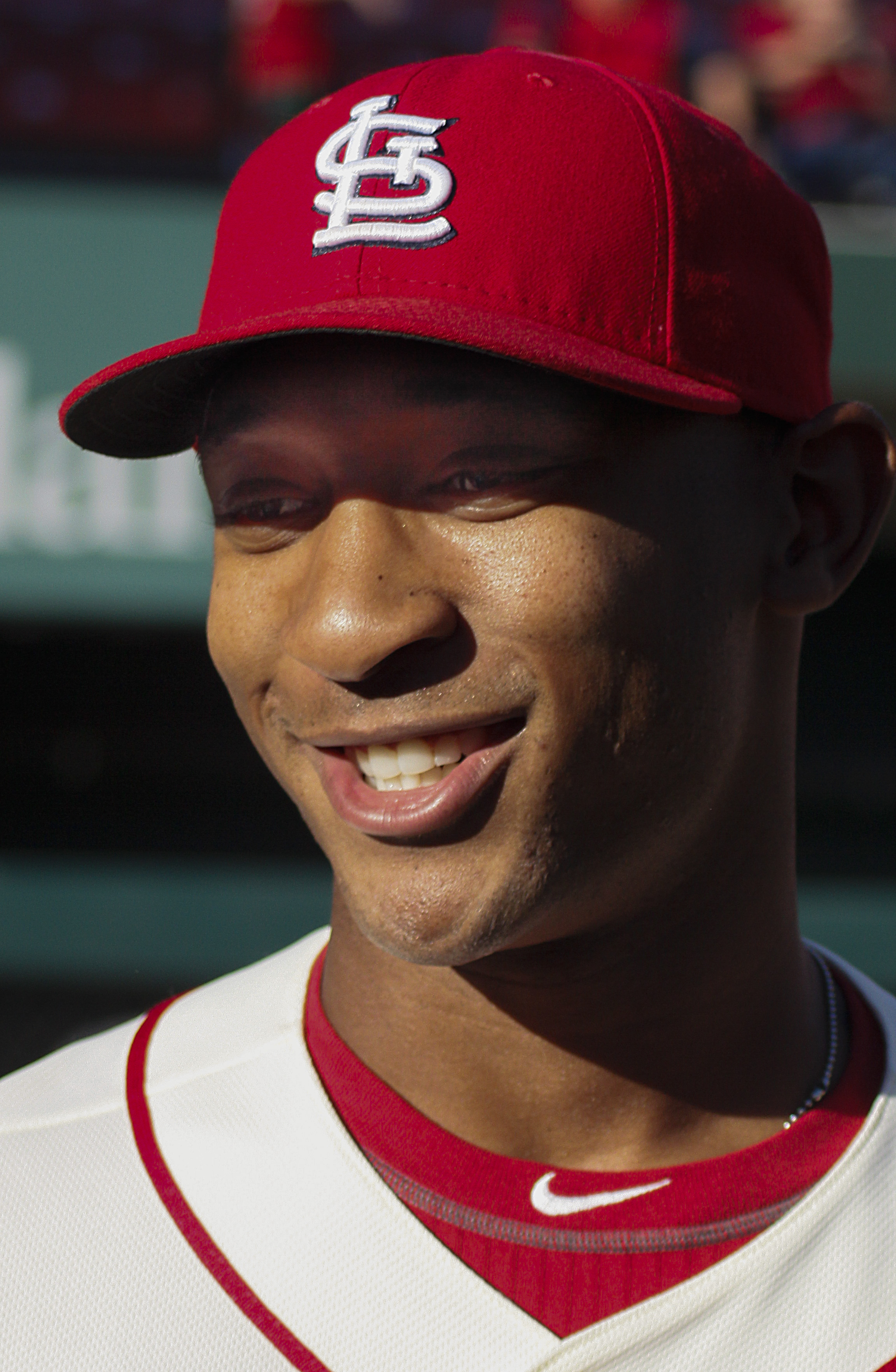
Freeman with the Cardinals in 2013

Freeman made his major league debut during Johan Santana's (New York Mets) no-hitter in New York on June 1, 2012. He appeared in 22 games for the St. Louis Cardinals in 2012, posting a record of 0-2 with a 5.40 ERA. Following the regular season he was sent by the Cardinals to play in the Arizona Fall League. After appearing in just 13 games in 2013, Freeman pitched in 44 games in 2014 with an ERA of 2.61 in 38 innings.

=== Texas Rangers ===
On March 28, 2015, the Texas Rangers acquired Freeman from the Cardinals for a player to be named later. He was designated for assignment on April 5 and outrighted on April 15. He was brought back up a few weeks later, finishing the season with 54 appearances for the Rangers.

=== Milwaukee Brewers ===
Freeman was acquired by the Milwaukee Brewers on April 5, 2016. He was designated for assignment on May 2, 2016, when the team recalled Junior Guerra. With the Brewers, he allowed 11 earned runs for a 12.91 ERA in seven appearances.

=== Atlanta Braves ===
On October 21, 2016, Freeman signed a minor league contract with an invitation to spring training with the Atlanta Braves. The Braves promoted him to the majors on May 4, 2017. For the season, he appeared in 58 games, going 2-0 with a 2.55 ERA.

Freeman and the Braves agreed to a one-year contract worth $1.075 million on January 11, 2018. He struggled with inconsistency throughout the 2018 season due to a lack of command, a problem that had been noted by several coaches over the course of his career. In late July, Freeman was placed on the disabled list, and returned to the active roster on August 19.

On March 22, 2019, Freeman was unconditionally released from the Atlanta Braves.

=== Los Angeles Angels ===
On March 27, 2019, Freeman signed a minor league contract with the Los Angeles Angels. Freeman had his contract selected on April 23. He was designated for assignment the next day following the promotion of Matt Ramsey. Freeman cleared waivers and was sent outright to the Triple–A Salt Lake Bees on April 29. Freeman was released by the Angels organization on August 19.

=== Washington Nationals ===
On August 21, 2019, Freeman signed a minor league contract with the Washington Nationals. He made 5 scoreless appearances down the stretch for the Triple–A Fresno Grizzlies, striking out 11 in 6 innings of work. Freeman elected free agency following the season on November 4.

On February 12, 2020, Freeman re–signed with the Nationals on a new minor league contract. On July 23, Freeman had his contract selected to the 40-man roster. In 7 appearances for Washington, he logged a 1.80 ERA with 6 strikeouts across 5 innings pitched. In August/September, Freeman underwent Tommy John surgery. He was removed from the 40–man roster and sent outright to Triple–A Fresno on October 12, and subsequently elected free agency.

=== Kansas City Royals ===
On December 27, 2021, Freeman signed a minor league contract with the Kansas City Royals organization. In 34 appearances with the Triple–A Omaha Storm Chasers, he posted a 1.50 ERA with 32 strikeouts and 1 save in 36.0 innings pitched. On August 24, 2022, Freeman was released.

=== Gastonia Honey Hunters ===
On June 6, 2023, Freeman signed with the Gastonia Honey Hunters of the Atlantic League of Professional Baseball. In 34 appearances for Gastonia, he logged a 6.06 ERA with 41 strikeouts in 35 2/3 innings pitched. On September 1, Freeman retired from professional baseball.

== Coaching career ==
On January 24, 2024, the Kansas City Royals hired Freeman to serve as the assistant pitching coach for their Single-A affiliate, the Columbia Fireflies.

== Awards ==
The Cardinal Nation/Scout.com Springfield Relief Pitcher of the Year: 2011

Texas League All-Star: 2011

Florida State League All-Star: 2009

Scout.com Johnson City Reliever of the Year: 2008
