= Hansel Robles =

Dominican baseball player (born 1990)

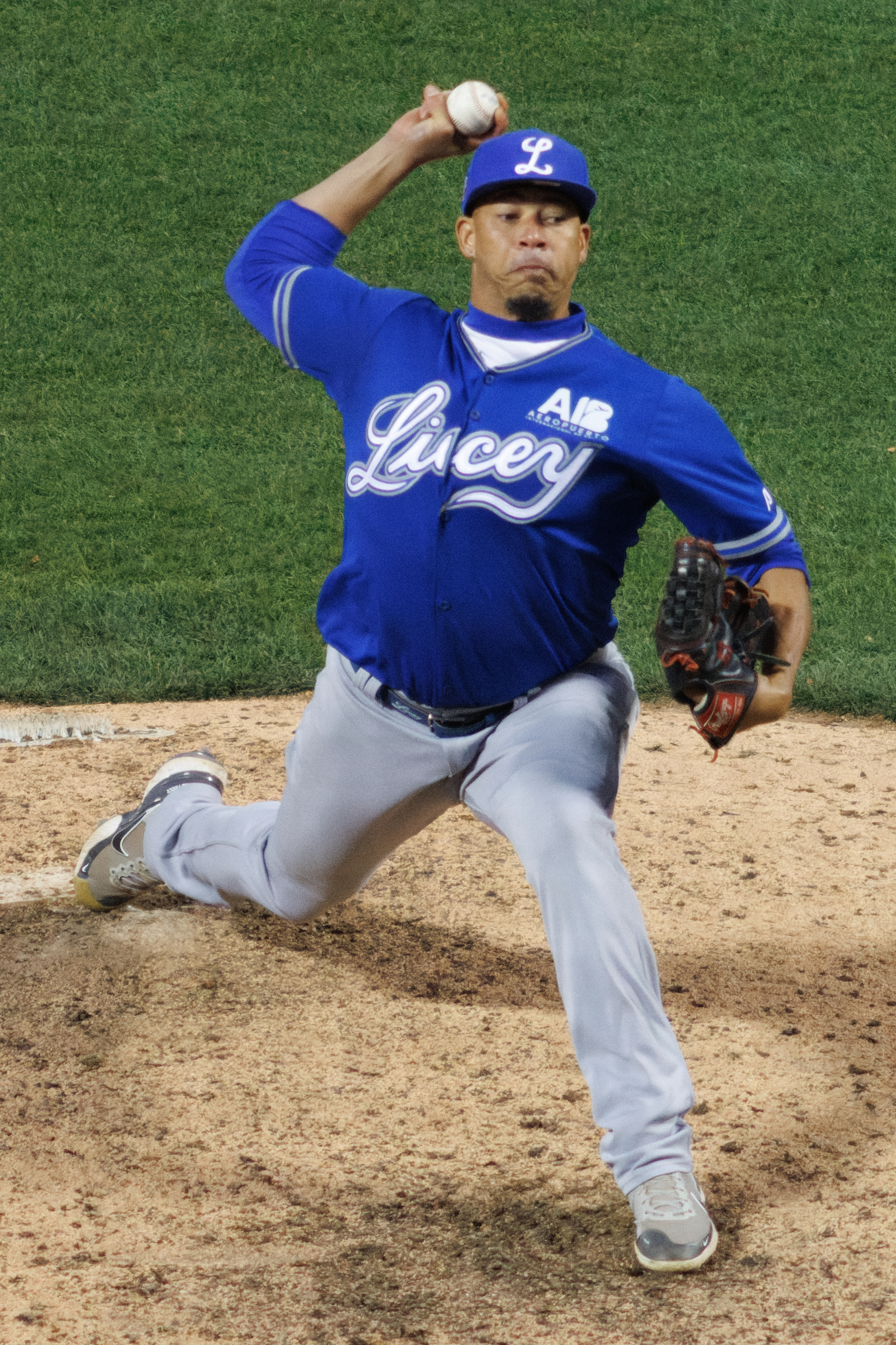
- Robles with the Tigres del Licey in 2023

Bravos de León – No. 57
- Pitcher
- Born: August 13, 1990 (age 36); Bonao, Monseñor Nouel, Dominican Republic
- Bats: Right Throws: Right

MLB debut
- April 24, 2015, for the New York Mets

MLB statistics (through 2022 season)
- Win–loss record: 28–26
- Earned run average: 4.11
- Strikeouts: 457
- Stats at Baseball Reference

Teams
- New York Mets (2015–2018); Los Angeles Angels (2018–2020); Minnesota Twins (2021); Boston Red Sox (2021–2022)

Hansel Manuel Robles (born August 13, 1990) is a Dominican professional baseball pitcher for the Bravos de León of the Mexican League. He has previously played in Major League Baseball (MLB) for the New York Mets, Los Angeles Angels, Minnesota Twins, and Boston Red Sox.

== Career ==
=== New York Mets ===
Robles signed as an international free agent in August 2008. Robles played in the minors with the Dominican Summer League Mets, Kingsport Mets, Brooklyn Cyclones, Gulf Coast League Mets, St. Lucie Mets, Binghamton Mets, and the Las Vegas 51s.

==== 2015 ====
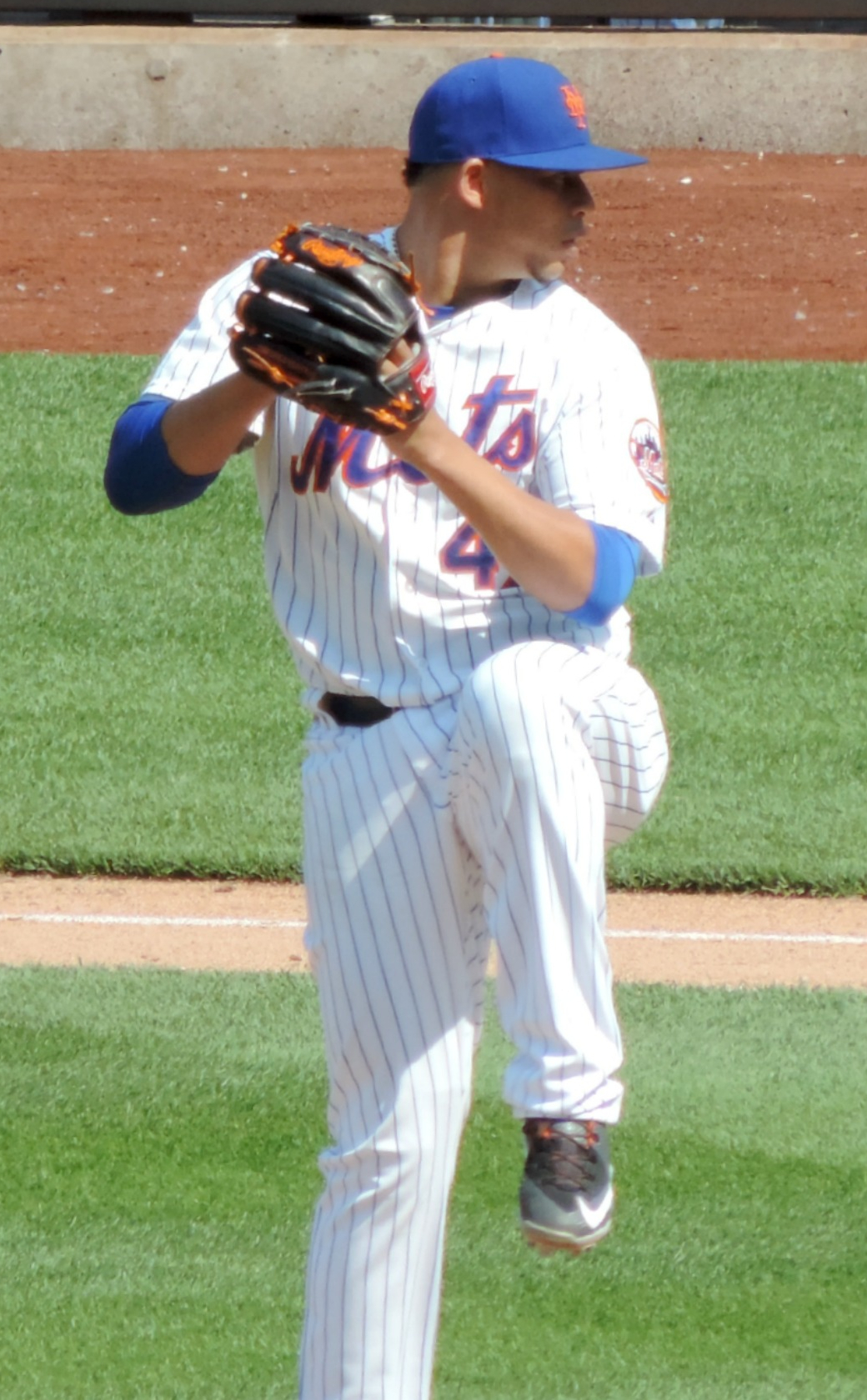
Robles with the Mets in 2015

The Mets added Robles to their 40-man roster on November 20, 2014. The Mets promoted him to the major leagues for the first time on April 20, 2015, to replace their injured reliever Jerry Blevins.

He made his Major League debut on April 24 against the interleague-rival New York Yankees. He came into the game in the seventh inning giving up a hit to Alex Rodriguez to load the bases, then getting Mark Teixeira to pop out and struck out Brian McCann and Carlos Beltrán to end the inning.

On October 2 while facing the Philadelphia Phillies, Robles threw a quick pitch near the head of batter Cameron Rupp; both benches emptied but no fight occurred. As there had been hit batsmen earlier in the game, and warnings had been issued to both teams, Robles was immediately ejected by home plate umpire Bob Davidson. As a result of the incident, Robles was suspended for three games by Major League Baseball and fined an undisclosed amount. He appealed the suspension and was allowed to play for the rest of the season. When the Mets made the playoffs, Robles was part of the roster of the Mets all the way up to the 2015 World Series. Once the appeal process completed, the suspension carried over into 2016.

Robles appeared in the Division Series against the Los Angeles Dodgers in game two in the eighth inning getting two strikeouts. In the World Series against the Kansas City Royals he appeared in game two in the bottom of the sixth inning getting the three batters he faced out. He also appeared in game four in the top of the ninth inning getting three outs, two of them strikeouts.

Robles finished the season with a 4–3 record, 3.67 ERA in 57 games in 54 innings pitched with a WHIP of 1.019 with 61 strikeouts while giving up 37 hits, 27 runs (22 of them earned), 8 home runs, and 18 walks.

==== 2016 ====
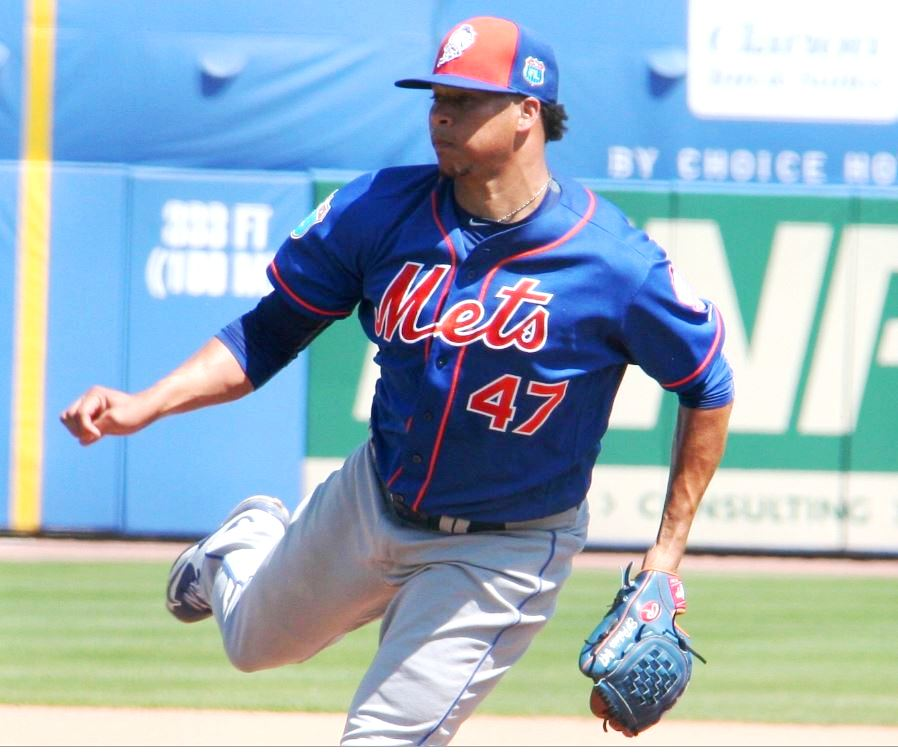
Robles with the Mets in 2016

Robles was not on the Mets' Opening Day roster due to his suspension, but joined the Mets for their home opener against the Philadelphia Phillies. On September 23 at Citi Field, Robles recorded his first career save after entering a game in the seventh inning and throwing hitless relief.

==== 2017 ====
In 2017, Robles underperformed. Before the summer began, he was demoted to Triple-A where he spent nearly two months before returning to the Mets. At the major league level, his walk rate increased for the second consecutive season and his home run rate nearly doubled.

==== 2018 ====
On January 12, Robles and the Mets agreed to a $900,000 deal, avoiding arbitration. Robles started the season in Triple-A, but was promoted on April 3 when Anthony Swarzak was placed on the disabled list with an oblique strain. He was optioned later in the month, and was called back up on May 5. Robles was designated for assignment on June 22. With the 2018 Mets, he compiled a 2–2 record with a 5.03 ERA in 16 relief appearances, striking out 23 batters in 19 2/3 innings.

=== Los Angeles Angels ===
On June 23, 2018, Robles was claimed off waivers by the Los Angeles Angels. With the Angels in 2018, he was 0-1 with 2 saves with a 2.97 ERA in 37 relief appearances, striking out 36 batters in 36 1/3 innings. Robles' continued his success with the Angels into the 2019 season, as he recorded an ERA of 2.48 in 71 appearances. He also served as closer, recording 23 saves in 72 2/3 innings. On December 2, Robles was nontendered by the Angels.

=== Minnesota Twins ===
On December 29, 2020, Robles signed a one-year, $2 million deal with the Minnesota Twins. Through July 2021, Robles appeared in 45 games with the Twins, all in relief, compiling a 3–4 record with 4.91 ERA and 43 strikeouts in 44 innings pitched.

=== Boston Red Sox ===
On July 30, 2021, Robles was traded to the Boston Red Sox in exchange for minor-league pitcher Alex Scherff. Robles earned his first save with the Red Sox on August 24, against the Twins. During the regular season, Robles made 27 relief appearances for Boston, compiling an 0–1 record with a 3.60 ERA and four saves, while striking out 33 batters in 25 innings. He made six postseason appearances, allowing four runs (three earned) in 5 1/3 innings, as the Red Sox advanced to the American League Championship Series. On November 3, Robles elected to become a free agent.

On March 19, 2022, Robles re-signed with the Red Sox on a minor-league contract with an invitation to spring training. He successfully made Boston's roster for Opening Day. He was placed in the injured list due to back spasms in late May, and rejoined the team on June 9. He was designated for assignment by the Red Sox following their July 5 game against the Tampa Bay Rays. He compiled a 1–3 record with a 5.84 ERA and two saves for the 2022 Red Sox. Robles was released by Boston on July 9.

=== Los Angeles Dodgers ===
Robles signed a minor-league contract with the Los Angeles Dodgers on July 24, 2022. He was assigned to the Oklahoma City Dodgers. In 20 games for Oklahoma City, Robles struggled to an 8.00 ERA with 18 strikeouts in 18 innings pitched. He elected free agency following the season on November 10.

=== Toros de Tijuana ===
On June 22, 2023, Robles signed with the Toros de Tijuana of the Mexican League. In 25 relief outings for Tijuana, he posted a 1.52 ERA with 25 strikeouts across 23 2/3 innings of work.

=== Seattle Mariners ===
On March 12, 2024, Robles signed a minor league contract with the Seattle Mariners. He did not make an appearance for the organization and elected free agency following the season on November 4.

On March 15, 2025, Robles signed with the Toros de Tijuana of the Mexican League. However he was released prior to the start of the season.

=== Caliente de Durango ===
On March 20, 2026, Robles signed with the Caliente de Durango of the Mexican League. In 30 appearances for the Caliente, he posted a 1–5 record with a 7.11 ERA, 34 strikeouts, 15 walks, and seven saves across 25 1/3 innings pitched. On July 17, Robles was released by Durango.

=== Bravos de León ===
On July 29, 2026, Robles signed with the Bravos de León of the Mexican League.
