= Ty Buttrey =

American baseball player (born 1993)

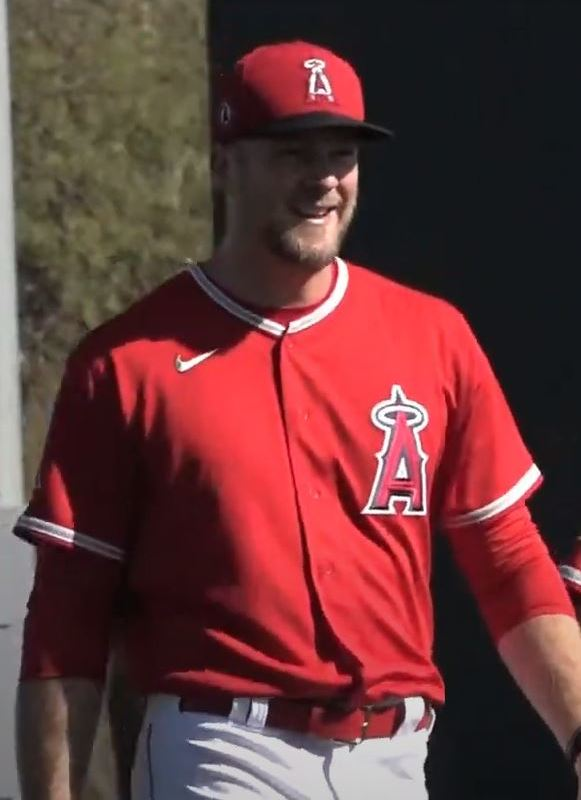
- Buttrey with the Los Angeles Angels in 2020
- Pitcher
- Born: March 31, 1993 (age 33); Matthews, North Carolina, U.S.
- Batted: Left Threw: Right

MLB debut
- August 16, 2018, for the Los Angeles Angels

Last MLB appearance
- September 25, 2020, for the Los Angeles Angels

MLB statistics
- Win–loss record: 8–11
- Earned run average: 4.30
- Strikeouts: 122
- Stats at Baseball Reference

Teams
- Los Angeles Angels (2018–2020)

Ty Douglas Buttrey (born March 31, 1993) is an American former professional baseball pitcher. He was drafted by the Boston Red Sox in the fourth round of the 2012 MLB draft. He played in Major League Baseball (MLB) for the Los Angeles Angels.

== Career ==
=== Boston Red Sox ===
The Boston Red Sox selected Buttrey in the fourth round of the 2012 MLB draft out of Providence High School in Charlotte, North Carolina. He had posted a 9–2 record with a 0.91 earned run average (ERA) and 100 strikeouts as a senior, averaging 13.04 strikeouts per 9 innings pitched. He signed for a signing bonus of $1,300,000, forgoing his commitment to play college baseball at the University of Arkansas.

Following four games for the rookie-level Gulf Coast League Red Sox in 2012, Buttrey pitched his first full professional season in 2013 with Low-A Lowell Spinners of the New York–Penn League, where he went 4–3 with a 2.21 ERA in 13 games started. In addition, he struck out 35 batters, did not allow a home run in 61 innings and allowed over two earned runs just twice in his 13 starts.

In 2014, Buttrey dealt with injuries and ineffectiveness, resulting in a 6.85 ERA with Single-A Greenville Drive. He earned a promotion to High-A Lowell Spinners after a 1–0 record with a 2.45 ERA in four starts and 22 innings. He returned for Greenville to begin 2015 and was promoted to High-A Salem Red Sox during the midseason.

In his first seven starts at Salem, Buttrey went 5–0 with a 1.71 ERA in 42 innings, being unbeaten in his combined 11 starts between A and High-A in 2015. He finished with an 8–10 record in 21 starts for Salem and was a tough luck loser, as he pitched 14 quality starts, but in five of those 14 starts was charged with the loss. Overall, he went 9–10 with a 3.92 ERA in 25 starts for Greenville and Salem, including 103 strikeouts against 48 walks in 137 2/3 innings.

Buttrey was assigned to Double-A Portland Sea Dogs in 2016, where he struggled with his command and averaged 5.3 walks to 5.8 strikeouts per nine innings, ending with a 1–9 record and 4.50 ERA in 32 appearances (nine starts). He opened 2017 at Portland and joined Triple-A Pawtucket Red Sox in the midseason. Overall, he went 2–5 with a 4.81 ERA and four saves in 83 2/3 innings of relief duties, averaging 10.5 strikeouts per 9 innings.

On November 20, 2017, the Red Sox added Buttrey to their 40-man roster to protect him from the Rule 5 draft. He started the 2018 season with Triple-A Pawtucket, for whom he was 1–1 with one save and a 2.25 ERA as he struck out 64 batters in 44 innings, averaging 13.1 strikeouts per 9 innings.

=== Los Angeles Angels ===
On July 31, 2018, the Red Sox traded Buttrey and pitcher Williams Jerez to the Los Angeles Angels in exchange for second baseman Ian Kinsler. Buttrey made his MLB debut on August 16. He finished 2018 with an 0–1 record, a 3.31 ERA, and 20 strikeouts in 16 1/3 innings.

The following season, he led the team in appearances with 72, recording a win–loss record of 6–7. In 2020, Buttrey served as closer towards the tail end of the season, recording five saves and overall registering a career-worst 5.81 ERA in 27 games.

On April 2, 2021, the Angels announced that Buttrey would be stepping away from the game, and he was placed on the restricted list. On April 3, Buttrey released a statement on Instagram explaining that he was retiring from baseball because he was playing for the "wrong" reasons—for money and to prove other people wrong.

On January 9, 2022, Buttrey, who remained on the Angels' restricted list, announced on Twitter his intention to return to baseball. On April 2, Buttrey was activated off of the restricted list and optioned to the Triple-A Salt Lake Bees. On June 9, Buttrey was designated for assignment by the Angels after Dillon Thomas was added to the roster. On June 15, he cleared waivers and was sent outright to Triple-A Salt Lake. He made 34 appearances for the Bees, pitching to a 5.94 ERA with 30 strikeouts in 36 1/3 innings of work. He elected free agency following the season on November 10.

=== Houston Astros ===
On January 31, 2023, Buttrey signed a minor league contract with the Houston Astros organization. He made three scoreless appearances for the rookie–level Florida Complex League Astros, but spent the majority of his time with the Triple–A Sugar Land Space Cowboys. In 14 games for Sugar Land, he registered a 5.40 ERA with 12 strikeouts and 2 saves in 13 1/3 innings pitched. On August 1, Buttrey was released by Houston.

=== Seattle Mariners ===
On January 16, 2024, Buttrey signed a minor league contract with the Seattle Mariners. In 29 appearances for the Triple–A Tacoma Rainiers, he struggled to a 9.00 ERA with 31 strikeouts across 29 innings pitched. Buttrey was released by the Mariners organization on August 2.

On December 30, 2024, Buttrey again announced his retirement from professional baseball.

== Personal life ==
Buttrey and his wife, Samantha, were married in 2017.
