= José Rodríguez (pitcher, born 1995) =

Venezuelan baseball player (born 1995)

- Pitcher
- Born: August 29, 1995 (age 30); Ciudad Bolívar, Venezuela
- Batted: Right Threw: Right

MLB debut
- July 27, 2019, for the Los Angeles Angels

Last MLB appearance
- April 11, 2023, for the Seattle Mariners

MLB statistics
- Win–loss record: 0–1
- Earned run average: 3.33
- Strikeouts: 14
- Stats at Baseball Reference

Teams
- Los Angeles Angels (2019–2020); Seattle Mariners (2023)

José Daniel Rodríguez (born August 29, 1995) is a Venezuelan former professional baseball pitcher. He has previously played in Major League Baseball (MLB) for the Los Angeles Angels and Seattle Mariners.

== Career ==
=== Los Angeles Angels ===
Rodríguez signed with the Los Angeles Angels as an international free agent on December 3, 2012. He spent the 2013 season with the Dominican Summer League Angels, going 3–3 with a 1.64 ERA in 44 innings. Rodríguez spent the 2014 season with the Arizona League Angels, going 2–1 with a 4.85 ERA in 26 innings. His 2015 season was spent with the rookie-level Orem Owlz, going 3–3 with a 4.79 ERA in 62 innings. Rodríguez spent the 2016 season with the Single-A Burlington Bees, going 7–5 with a 3.14 ERA in 131 2/3 innings. In the 2017 season, he played for the High-A Inland Empire 66ers, going 8–12 with a 5.18 ERA in 149 innings. Rodríguez spent the 2018 season with the Double-A Mobile BayBears, going 7–10 with a 6.12 ERA in 114 2/3 innings pitched. He opened the 2019 season back with Mobile, before being promoted to the Triple-A Salt Lake Bees on May 18.

On July 27, 2019, the Angels selected Rodríguez's contract and promoted him to the major leagues for the first time. Rodríguez made his debut that night, throwing 1 2/3 scoreless innings in relief. In 19 2/3 innings for the Angels, he struck out 13 while allowing 11 walks in the process. On December 9, Rodríguez was removed from the 40-man roster and sent outright to Salt Lake.

On August 1, 2020, Rodríguez's contract was selected to the 40-man roster. On August 10, he was designated for assignment. On August 15, Rodríguez was outrighted to the alternate training site and elected free agency on October 19.

=== Atlanta Braves ===
On April 21, 2021, Rodríguez signed a minor league contract with the Atlanta Braves organization. Rodríguez split the season between the Triple-A Gwinnett Stripers and the Double-A Mississippi Braves, pitching to a combined 7-7 record and 4.47 ERA in 100 2/3 innings pitched across 23 appearances. He elected free agency following the season on November 7.

=== New York Mets ===
On November 23, 2021, Rodríguez signed a minor league contract with the New York Mets. In 2022, Rodríguez pitched in 29 games (starting 11), and posted a 2-3 record and 4.95 ERA with 68 strikeouts in 76 1/3 innings pitched. He elected free agency following the season on November 10, 2022.

=== Seattle Mariners ===
On November 22, 2022, Rodríguez signed a minor league contract with the Seattle Mariners. He was assigned to the Triple-A Tacoma Rainiers to begin the 2023 season and tossed five scoreless innings in two appearances. On April 10, 2023, Rodríguez had his contract selected to the active roster. He made only one appearance for Seattle, surrendering 3 runs in 3.0 innings of relief against the Chicago Cubs. On July 7, Rodríguez was removed from the 40-man roster and sent outright to Triple–A Tacoma. On October 6, Rodríguez elected free agency.

== See also ==
- List of Major League Baseball players from Venezuela
