= Taylor Cole (baseball) =

American baseball pitcher (born 1989)

- Pitcher
- Born: August 20, 1989 (age 36); Simi Valley, California, U.S.
- Batted: Right Threw: Right

MLB debut
- August 9, 2017, for the Toronto Blue Jays

Last MLB appearance
- September 29, 2019, for the Los Angeles Angels

MLB statistics
- Win–loss record: 7–6
- Earned run average: 4.97
- Strikeouts: 90
- Stats at Baseball Reference

Teams
- Toronto Blue Jays (2017); Los Angeles Angels (2018–2019)

Career highlights and awards
- Pitched a combined no-hitter on July 12, 2019

Taylor James Cole (born August 20, 1989) is an American former professional baseball pitcher. He was drafted by the Toronto Blue Jays in the 29th round of the 2011 Major League Baseball draft. He made his MLB debut for the Blue Jays in 2017 and also played in Major League Baseball (MLB) for the Los Angeles Angels.

== Professional career ==
=== Toronto Blue Jays ===
==== Minor leagues ====
Cole was born in Simi Valley, California. He was drafted by the Los Angeles Dodgers in the 26th round of the 2007 Major League Baseball draft out of Bishop Gorman High School in Las Vegas, Nevada. He did not sign, and instead attended the College of Southern Nevada. He was drafted again, this time by the Arizona Diamondbacks in the 31st round of the 2008 Major League Baseball draft, and again did not sign. Cole did not play baseball in 2009 and 2010 while he was on his Mormon Mission. He returned to pitch in 2011 for the Brigham Young University Cougars baseball team.

Cole was drafted a third time, by the Toronto Blue Jays in the 29th round of the 2011 Major League Baseball draft. He signed with the Blue Jays and made his professional debut with the Vancouver Canadians, making 11 appearances (8 starts) in 2011 and posting a 1–3 win–loss record, 5.88 ERA, and 25 strikeouts in 33 2/3 innings. Cole played the entire 2012 season in Vancouver and greatly improved, posting a 6–0 record, 0.81 ERA, and 57 strikeouts in 66 1/3 innings. He played the majority of the 2013 season with the Lansing Lugnuts, and made 1 start for the Dunedin Blue Jays at the end of the season. Cole would pitched to a combined 7–12 record, 3.94 ERA, and 103 strikeouts in 137 innings.

In 2014, Cole pitched mostly for Dunedin and made two starts for the Double-A New Hampshire Fisher Cats. He finished the season with a combined 8–11 record, 3.43 ERA, and an MiLB-leading 181 strikeouts. Cole played the entire 2015 season with New Hampshire, pitching to a 7–10 record, 4.06 ERA, and 128 strikeouts in a career-high 164 innings.

Cole was invited to Major League spring training on January 12, 2016, and reassigned to minor league camp on March 12. He battled injuries in 2016, pitching only 77 innings and posting a 4–4 record, 3.97 ERA, and 62 strikeouts.

==== Major leagues ====
Cole was called up to the Blue Jays on August 5, 2017. He made his debut on August 9, pitching one inning of the Blue Jays' 11–5 loss to the New York Yankees. Cole allowed four earned runs and struck out Aaron Judge for his first MLB strikeout. The following day, Cole was placed on the disabled list with a broken toe. On August 14, Cole was released. Cole signed a minor-league contract with the Blue Jays on August 18, and was added to the 40-man roster on September 29. He was removed from the 40-man roster and sent outright to Triple-A on November 6, and elected free agency the following day.

=== Los Angeles Angels ===
On March 4, 2018, Cole signed a minor league contract with the Los Angeles Angels. On June 28, Cole was added to the team's active roster. For the 2018 season, he was 4–2 with a 2.75 ERA and 39 strikeouts in 36 innings.

On July 12, 2019, Cole pitched two innings in a combined no-hitter (which was finished by 7 innings from Félix Peña) against the Seattle Mariners. He made 38 total appearances (six starts) for Los Angeles on the year, in which he compiled a 3-4 record and 5.92 ERA wi the 50 strikeouts across 51 2/3 innings pitched.

Cole was designated for assignment by the Angels on March 22, 2020. In August, Cole underwent shoulder surgery and missed the remainder of the season. On October 5, Cole elected free agency.

=== Boston Red Sox ===
On January 19, 2022, Cole signed a minor league contract with the Boston Red Sox that included an invitation to spring training. In 19 appearances for the Triple-A Worcester Red Sox, he posted a 2-0 record and 5.14 ERA with 27 strikeouts over 28 innings of work. Cole was released by the Red Sox organization on July 3.

=== Tecolotes de los Dos Laredos ===
On July 14, 2022, Cole signed with the Tecolotes de los Dos Laredos of the Mexican League. He made four starts for the Tecolotes, posting a 2-1 record and 3.68 ERA with 13 strikeouts across 14 2/3 innings pitched.

On January 10, 2023, Cole retired from professional baseball.

Awards and achievements
Preceded by Mike Fiers	No-hit game July 12, 2019 (with Felix Peña)	Succeeded by Aaron Sanchez, Will Harris, Joe Biagini, Chris Devenski
