= Luke Bard =

American baseball player (born 1990)

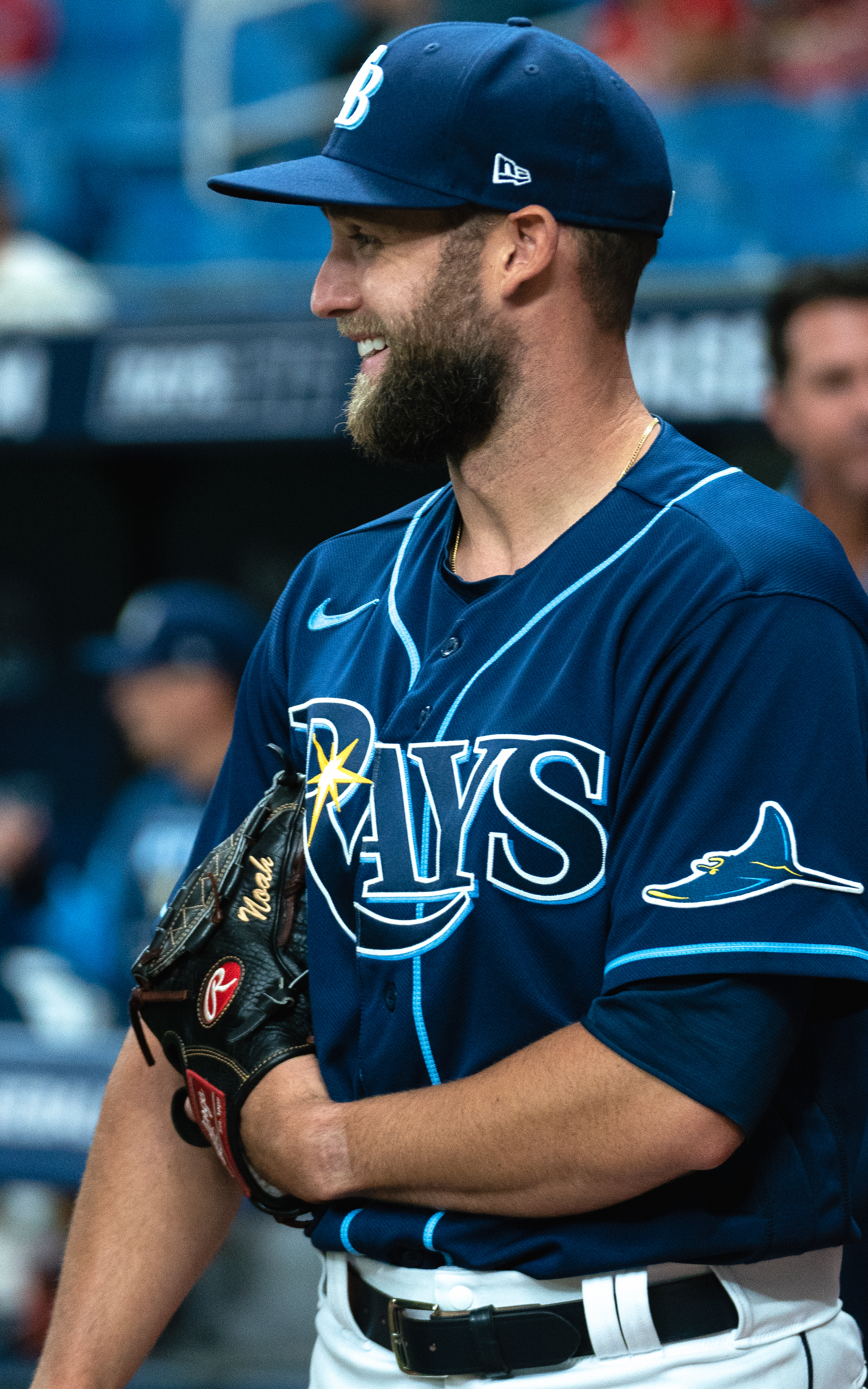
- Bard with the Tampa Bay Rays in 2022
- Pitcher
- Born: November 13, 1990 (age 35); Charlotte, North Carolina, U.S.
- Batted: Right Threw: Right

MLB debut
- March 31, 2018, for the Los Angeles Angels

Last MLB appearance
- August 28, 2022, for the New York Yankees

MLB statistics
- Win–loss record: 4–4
- Earned run average: 4.44
- Strikeouts: 68
- Stats at Baseball Reference

Teams
- Los Angeles Angels (2018–2020); Tampa Bay Rays (2022); New York Yankees (2022)

Luke Francis Bard (born November 13, 1990) is an American former professional baseball pitcher. He played in Major League Baseball (MLB) for the Los Angeles Angels, Tampa Bay Rays, and New York Yankees.

== Career ==
=== Amateur career ===
Bard attended Charlotte Christian School in Charlotte, North Carolina, and the Georgia Institute of Technology, where he played college baseball for the Georgia Tech Yellow Jackets. In 2010 and 2011, he played collegiate summer baseball with the Brewster Whitecaps of the Cape Cod Baseball League.

=== Minnesota Twins ===
The Minnesota Twins selected Bard in the first round of the 2012 Major League Baseball draft. He signed and made his professional debut that same year with the Gulf Coast League Twins before being reassigned to the Elizabethton Twins. In seven games between the two teams, he posted a 3.86 ERA. In 2013, he pitched for the GCL Twins, Elizabethton, and the Fort Myers Miracle, going 1–0 with a 3.65 ERA in 12 1/3 total innings pitched between the three teams. He missed 2014 and 2015 due to injury. Bard returned in 2016 and he spent the season with Fort Myers and the Chattanooga Lookouts, going 3–1 with a 3.74 ERA in 44 relief appearances. In 2017, he was 4–3 with a 2.76 ERA in 65 1/3 innings pitched between the Lookouts and Rochester Red Wings.

=== Los Angeles Angels ===
On December 14, 2017, the Angels selected Bard in the Rule 5 draft. He made the Angels' Opening Day 25-man roster, and made his major league debut on March 31. In eight games for the Angels, Bard compiled a 5.40 ERA with 13 strikeouts across 11 2/3 innings. On April 21, Bard was designated for assignment by Los Angeles.

=== Minnesota Twins (second stint) ===
On April 27, 2018, Bard was returned to the Minnesota Twins organization. In 32 games for the Triple–A Rochester Red Wings, he recorded a 4.66 ERA with 52 strikeouts across 48 1/3 innings pitched. Bard elected free agency following the season on November 2.

=== Los Angeles Angels (second stint) ===
On February 16, 2019, Bard signed a minor league contract with the Los Angeles Angels. He made the team out of spring training and had his contract purchased before the season. He was sent down multiple times to the minors through the whole season, appearing in only 32 games for the Angels. Bard pitched in 5 1/3 innings for the Angels in 2020, registering a 6.75 ERA and seven strikeouts.

On March 29, 2021, Bard was placed on the 60-day injured list with a hip injury. On April 8, it was announced that Bard would undergo season-ending hip surgery. Bard had hip resurfacing surgery on his right hip on May 20, at the Hospital for Special Surgery. On October 23, Bard elected free agency.

=== Tampa Bay Rays ===
On March 24, 2022, Bard signed a minor league contract with the Tampa Bay Rays. On May 18, Bard was selected to the 40-man roster and immediately optioned to the Triple-A Durham Bulls. Bard pitched for Durham until he was called up by Rays on June 7. The next evening he made his major league return with a one-hit, two-strikeout two-inning outing versus the St. Louis Cardinals. On August 1, the Rays designated Bard for assignment.

=== New York Yankees ===
On August 5, 2022, the New York Yankees claimed Bard off of waivers and assigned him to Triple–A. The Yankees promoted him to the major leagues on August 21. On September 6, Bard was designated for assignment, after only one appearance for the Yankees in which he threw a scoreless inning. He cleared waivers and was sent outright to the Triple–A Scranton/Wilkes-Barre RailRiders on September 10. On October 24, Bard elected free agency.

=== Toronto Blue Jays ===
On February 11, 2023, Bard signed a minor league contract with the Toronto Blue Jays organization that included a non-roster invitation to spring training. In 16 games (6 starts) for the Triple–A Buffalo Bisons, he registered a 6.15 ERA with 29 strikeouts and 1 save in 26 1/3 innings of work. Bard was released by Toronto on June 5.

Bard retired from professional baseball shortly thereafter, and returned to Northeastern University to complete his Interdisciplinary Studies degree.

== Personal life ==
Bard's older brother, Daniel, has also played in the major leagues. His cousin, John Andreoli, is also a former MLB player for the Seattle Mariners, Baltimore Orioles, and San Diego Padres.

== See also ==
- Rule 5 draft results
