= Miguel Del Pozo =

Dominican baseball player (born 1992)

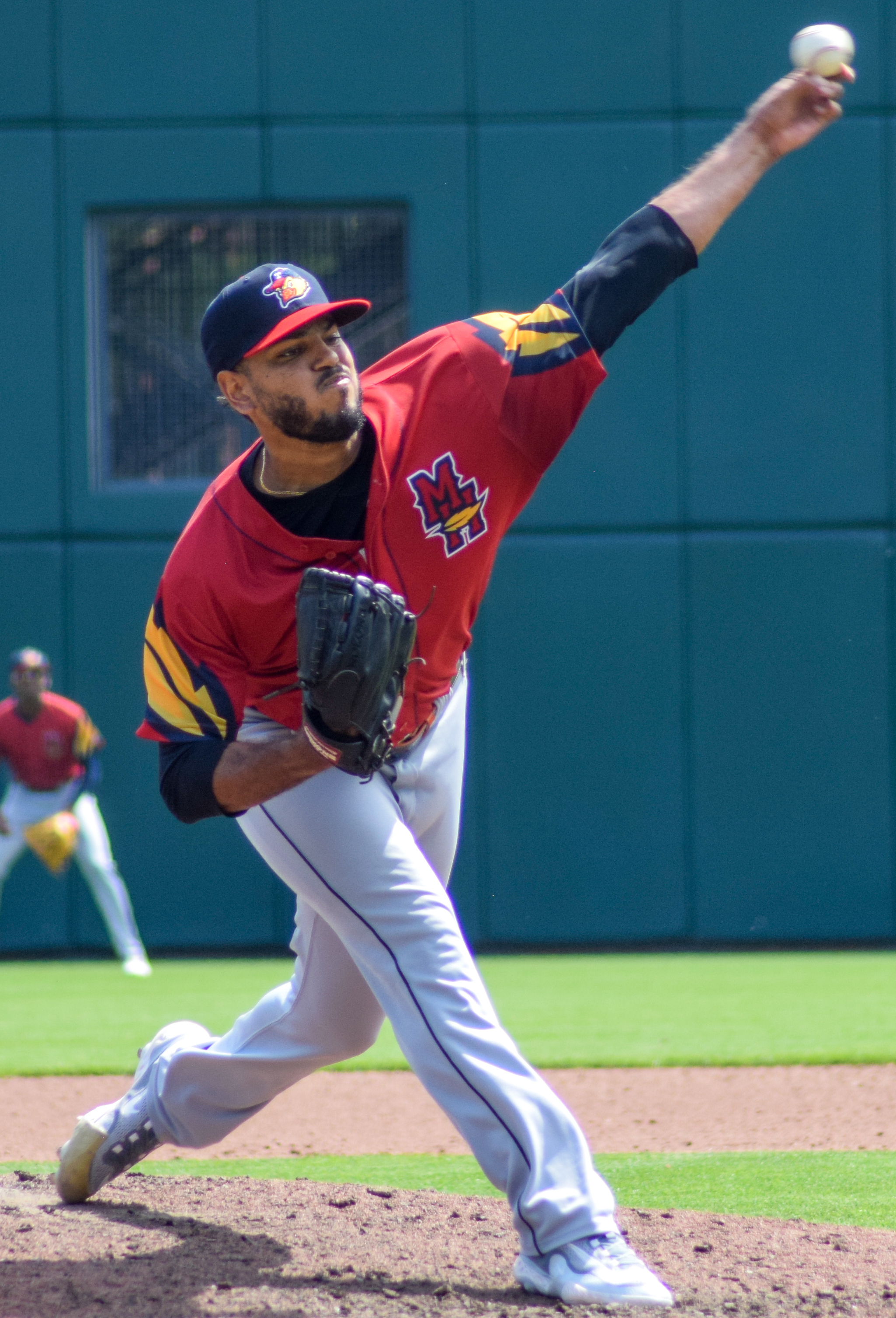
- Del Pozo with the Toledo Mud Hens in 2023

Free agent
- Pitcher
- Born: October 14, 1992 (age 32); Santo Domingo, Dominican Republic
- Bats: Left Throws: Left

MLB debut
- August 20, 2019, for the Los Angeles Angels

MLB statistics (through 2021 season)
- Win–loss record: 1–1
- Earned run average: 9.82
- Strikeouts: 17
- Stats at Baseball Reference

Teams
- Los Angeles Angels (2019); Pittsburgh Pirates (2020); Detroit Tigers (2021)

Miguel Eduardo Del Pozo (born October 14, 1992) is a Dominican professional baseball pitcher who is a free agent. He has previously played in Major League Baseball (MLB) for the Los Angeles Angels, Pittsburgh Pirates, and Detroit Tigers.

== Career ==
=== Miami Marlins ===
Del Pozo signed with the Florida Marlins as an international free agent on November 20, 2010. He spent the 2011 season with the DSL Marlins, going 3–3 with a 5.09 ERA in 40 2/3 innings. He played for the GCL Marlins in 2012, going 1–2 with a 4.02 ERA in 31 innings. His 2013 season was split between the Batavia Muckdogs and the Jupiter Hammerheads, going a combined 2–1 with a 4.44 ERA over 26 innings. He spent the 2014 season with the Greensboro Grasshoppers, going 2–6 with a 4.91 ERA in 66 innings. He returned to Jupiter for the 2015 season, going 2–5 with a 4.25 ERA in 59 innings. He missed the 2016 season due to Tommy John surgery. He split the 2017 season between the GCL, Greensboro, Jupiter, and the Jacksonville Jumbo Shrimp, going a combined 3–0 with a 0.70 ERA in 25 2/3 innings. Del Pozo was added to the Marlins 40-man roster following the 2017 season. He returned to Jacksonville for the 2018 season, going 5–0 with a 3.97 ERA in 34 innings. Del Pozo was outrighted off the Marlins roster on October 26. He elected free agency on November 2.

=== Texas Rangers ===
Del Pozo signed a minor league contract with the Texas Rangers on December 21, 2018. He was assigned to the Nashville Sounds and went 2–3 with a 5.12 ERA in 45 2/3 innings for them.

=== Los Angeles Angels ===
On August 9, 2019, Del Pozo was traded to the Los Angeles Angels in exchange for cash considerations. He was assigned to the Salt Lake Bees following the trade.

On August 18, 2019, the Angels selected Del Pozo's contract and promoted him to the major leagues. He made his major league debut on August 20 versus the Texas Rangers, pitching 2/3 of an inning. Del Pozo elected free agency following the 2019 season.

=== Pittsburgh Pirates ===
On December 17, 2019, Del Pozo signed a minor-league contract with the Pittsburgh Pirates. During his first three appearances on the Pirates roster in 2020 he walked eight of fourteen batters. In an August 3, 2020, game against the Minnesota Twins, he walked all of the three batters he faced, before being taken off the mound. In his next appearance, he gave up three runs on five hits over two innings, and was optioned the following day. Del Pozo was designated for assignment on August 13. Del Pozo elected free agency on October 13, 2020.

=== Detroit Tigers ===
On January 7, 2021, Del Pozo signed a minor-league contract with the Detroit Tigers. He was assigned to the Triple-A Toledo Mud Hens to begin the season, and recorded a stellar 1.32 ERA in 12 appearances. On June 15, Del Pozo was selected to the active roster. Del Pozo logged a 3.38 ERA in 5 appearances for Detroit in 2021.

On April 6, 2022, Del Pozo was designated for assignment by the Tigers. He was outrighted to Triple-A Toledo the following day. In 55 appearances for Toledo, Del Pozo worked to a 3.88 ERA with 66 strikeouts and 7 saves in 53 1/3 innings pitched. He elected free agency following the season on October 6, 2022.

On October 21, 2022, he re–signed with Detroit on a new minor-league contract. Del Pozo made 15 appearances for Triple–A Toledo in 2023, struggling to a 6.05 ERA with 23 strikeouts and 2 saves in 19 1/3 innings of work. On June 14, 2023, it was announced that Del Pozo had undergone Tommy John surgery and would miss the remainder of the season. He was released by the Tigers organization on August 9.

=== San Francisco Giants ===
On June 20, 2024, Del Pozo signed a minor league contract with the San Francisco Giants. He did not appear in a game for the organization, and was released by San Francisco on March 20, 2025.
