= Joe Biagini =

American baseball player (born 1990)

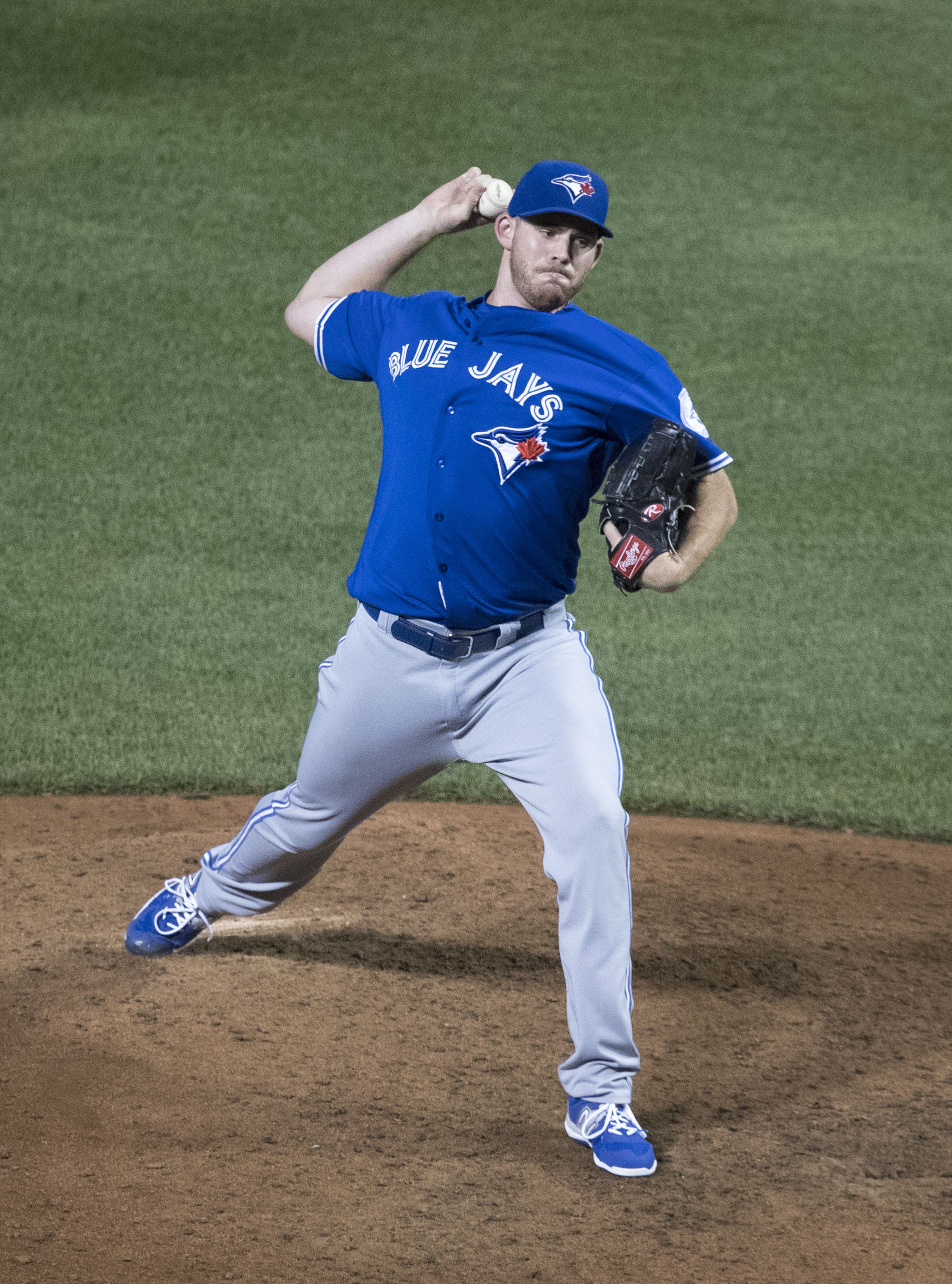
- Biagini with the Toronto Blue Jays in 2016
- Pitcher
- Born: May 29, 1990 (age 36); Menlo Park, California, U.S.
- Batted: Right Threw: Right

MLB debut
- April 8, 2016, for the Toronto Blue Jays

Last MLB appearance
- October 3, 2021, for the Chicago Cubs

MLB statistics
- Win–loss record: 15–25
- Earned run average: 5.03
- Strikeouts: 278
- Stats at Baseball Reference

Teams
- Toronto Blue Jays (2016–2019); Houston Astros (2019–2020); Chicago Cubs (2021)

Career highlights and awards
- Pitched a combined no-hitter on August 3, 2019

Joseph Carlo Biagini (born May 29, 1990) is an American former professional baseball pitcher. He played in Major League Baseball (MLB) for the Toronto Blue Jays, Houston Astros and Chicago Cubs. The San Francisco Giants selected Biagini in the 26th round of the 2011 MLB draft, and he made his MLB debut for Toronto in 2016. Born in the United States, he represented the Italy national baseball team.

== High school and college ==
Biagini attended The King's Academy in Sunnyvale, California. After the graduation, he attended the College of San Mateo and later the University of California, Davis. While attending the College of San Mateo in 2010, Biagini underwent Tommy John surgery. After the 2011 season, he played collegiate summer baseball with the Brewster Whitecaps of the Cape Cod Baseball League.

== Professional career ==
=== San Francisco Giants ===
The San Francisco Giants selected Biagini in the 26th round of the 2011 Major League Baseball draft. He made his professional debut with the Class-A Augusta GreenJackets in 2012. In nine starts with the team, he pitched to a 0–4 win–loss record, 7.41 earned run average (ERA), and 36 strikeouts in 34 innings. He was demoted to the Short Season-A Salem-Keizer Volcanoes in June, where he made 14 appearances (12 starts) and pitched to a 2–4 record, 4.27 ERA, and 63 strikeouts in 59 innings. Biagini played the entire 2013 season with the GreenJackets, pitching 96 2/3 total innings in 20 starts. He posted a 7–6 record, 5.03 ERA, and 79 strikeouts.

In 2014, Biagini was promoted to the Advanced-A San Jose Giants, and made 23 starts for the team, finishing the year with a 10–9 record, 4.01 ERA, and 103 strikeouts in 128 innings pitched. He would play the entire 2015 season with the Double-A Richmond Flying Squirrels and threw a career-high 130 1/3 innings over 23 appearances (22 starts). Biagini finished the season with a 10–7 win–loss record, 2.42 ERA, and 84 strikeouts.

=== Toronto Blue Jays ===
On December 10, 2015, Biagini was selected by the Toronto Blue Jays in the Rule 5 draft.

==== Major leagues ====
On March 30, 2016, manager John Gibbons announced that Biagini had made the Opening Day roster, and would pitch out of the bullpen. He made his Major League debut on April 8, pitching a perfect 9th inning against the Boston Red Sox, and struck out David Ortiz for his first career strikeout. He earned his first win on May 3, pitching a perfect 10th inning in an eventual 3–1 walk-off victory over the Texas Rangers. On May 19, Biagini earned his first save, pitching the 11th inning in a 3–2 win over the Minnesota Twins. Biagini did not yield a home run until September 3, when Kevin Kiermaier of the Tampa Bay Rays hit a two-run shot in a 7–5 loss for the Blue Jays. Biagini finished his first MLB season with a 4–3 record, 3.06 ERA, and 62 strikeouts in 67 2/3 innings pitched.

Biagini began the 2017 season in the Blue Jays' bullpen. With injuries and ineffective performances in Toronto's starting rotation, Biagini made his first career start on May 7 and held Tampa Bay to a single unearned run on two hits in four innings, leading the Blue Jays to a 2–1 victory. From May to early July, Biagini made 11 starts filling in for the injured Aaron Sanchez and Francisco Liriano. He was then moved back to the bullpen. On August 4, Biagini was optioned to the Triple-A Buffalo Bisons. He returned to the major leagues, and the rotation, on August 27, allowing 5 runs over 3 2/3 innings in a 7–2 loss to the Minnesota Twins. On September 1, in a game against the Baltimore Orioles, Biagini had his best start as a Blue Jay to date, throwing 7 shutout innings and striking out a career-high 10 batters, though Toronto would eventually lose 1–0 in the 13th. Biagini finished the season splitting time between the rotation and the bullpen, finishing with a record of 3–13 in 44 games, 18 starts. In 119 2/3 innings, he struck out 97.

Following the signing of Jaime García to be their fifth starter, the Blue Jays optioned Biagini to Buffalo to begin the 2018 season, where he was named the Opening Day starter for the Bisons. The Blue Jays called up Biagini to make a spot start on April 17, for the second game of their doubleheader against the Kansas City Royals. Following the game, he was returned to the Bisons. After returning to the major leagues, Biagini spent the majority of the season in the Blue Jays bullpen, appearing in 50 games while making 4 spot starts. He finished the season with a 4–2 record and an ERA of 6 over 72 innings.

=== Houston Astros ===
On July 31, 2019, Biagini was traded to the Houston Astros (along with Aaron Sanchez and Cal Stevenson) in exchange for Derek Fisher. In his first appearance with the Astros, Biagini pitched an inning of relief in a combined no-hitter against the Seattle Mariners. The final score was 9–0. With the 2020 Houston Astros, Biagini appeared in 4 games, compiling a 0–0 record with 20.77 ERA and 4 strikeouts in 4.1 innings pitched. On September 29, Biagini was designated for assignment. Biagini rejected his outright assignment and elected free agency on October 9, 2020.

=== Chicago Cubs ===
On December 17, 2020, Biagini signed a minor league contract with the Chicago Cubs organization. He played with the Iowa Cubs and was temporarily added to the team's roster as a COVID-19 replacement on October 2 and was removed on October 18, 2021. He elected free agency on November 7.

=== Toronto Blue Jays (second stint) ===
On March 13, 2022, Biagini signed a minor league contract with the Toronto Blue Jays. He was released on July 26, 2022.

== International career ==
Born in the United States and of Italian descent, Biagini played for the Italy national baseball team at the 2023 World Baseball Classic.

== Personal life ==
Biagini's father, Rob, played for the San Francisco Giants organization from 1981 to 1982.

In November 2016, Biagini was a member of the audience at a taping of The Tonight Show Starring Jimmy Fallon. During the show, Fallon passed Biagini in the audience and attempted to high-five him along with other audience members, but missed Biagini's hand. During the November 18 episode, Fallon stated that he had taken criticism on Twitter for botching the high-five, and brought Biagini out on stage briefly to complete their high-five.

== See also ==
- List of Houston Astros no-hitters
- List of Major League Baseball no-hitters
- List of University of California, Davis alumni

Awards and achievements
Preceded by Taylor Cole, Félix Peña	No-hit game August 3, 2019 (with Sanchez, Harris & Devenski)	Succeeded by Justin Verlander
