= Matt Ramsey (baseball) =

American baseball player (born 1989)

- Pitcher
- Born: September 24, 1989 (age 36); Oak Ridge, Tennessee, U.S.
- Batted: Right Threw: Right

MLB debut
- April 25, 2019, for the Los Angeles Angels

Last MLB appearance
- April 25, 2019, for the Los Angeles Angels

MLB statistics
- Win–loss record: 0–0
- Earned run average: 0.00
- Strikeouts: 1
- Stats at Baseball Reference

Teams
- Los Angeles Angels (2019)

Matthew Garrett Ramsey (born September 24, 1989) is an American former professional baseball pitcher. He played in Major League Baseball (MLB) for the Los Angeles Angels.

== Amateur career ==
Ramsey was born in Oak Ridge, Tennessee and attended Farragut High School in Knoxville, Tennessee. He was drafted by the Cleveland Indians in the 46th round of the 2008 MLB draft but did not sign. He attended the University of Tennessee, where he played college baseball for the Tennessee Volunteers. In 2010, he played collegiate summer baseball with the Harwich Mariners of the Cape Cod Baseball League.

== Professional career ==
=== Tampa Bay Rays ===
The Tampa Bay Rays selected Ramsey in the 19th round, with the 600th overall selection, of the 2011 MLB draft, and signed. He made his professional debut in 2012 with the Gulf Coast Rays, going 2–1 with a 1.98 ERA in 13.2 innings. He split the 2013 season between the Bowling Green Hot Rods and the Charlotte Stone Crabs, accumulating a 1–2 record with a 2.84 ERA in 50.2 innings.

=== Miami Marlins ===
On July 7, 2014, Ramsey was traded to the Miami Marlins for international bonus slot money. He split 2014 between the Montgomery Biscuits and the Jacksonville Suns, going a combined 3–2 with a 1.47 ERA in 60 innings. On November 24, 2014, the Marlins added him to the 40-man roster. He spent the entire 2015 season on the disabled list due to an undisclosed injury. He was outrighted off the 40-man roster following the 2015 season. His 2016 season was split between the Gulf Coast Marlins, the Jupiter Hammerheads, and Jacksonville, accumulating a 1–1 record with a 1.99 ERA in just 22 innings.

=== Milwaukee Brewers ===
Ramsey was selected by the Milwaukee Brewers in the Triple-A phase of the 2016 Rule 5 draft. His 2017 season was split between the Double–A Biloxi Shuckers, and the Triple–A Colorado Springs Sky Sox, accumulating a 3–4 record with a 5.26 ERA in 49.2 innings. Ramsey elected free agency following the season on November 6, 2017.

=== Houston Astros ===
On December 11, 2017, he signed a minor league contract with the Houston Astros. In 2018, he split the season between the rookie–level Gulf Coast Astros and the Triple–A Fresno Grizzlies, accumulating a 3–2 record with a 2.04 ERA in 53 innings. Ramsey elected free agency following the season on November 2, 2018.

=== Los Angeles Angels ===
On December 11, 2018, Ramsey signed a minor league contract with the Los Angeles Angels. He opened the 2019 season with the Salt Lake Bees. On April 24, his contract was purchased and he was recalled to the major league roster. He was designated for assignment on May 31 after pitching only 1.0 scoreless inning with one strikeout. Ramsey was released by the Angels on June 2, 2019.

=== Sugar Land Skeeters ===
On June 28, 2019, Ramsey signed with the Sugar Land Skeeters of the Atlantic League of Professional Baseball. He recorded a 4.50 ERA in 4 games for the club.

=== Toros de Tijuana ===
His contract was purchased by the Toros de Tijuana of the Mexican League on July 10, 2019. Ramsey did not play in a game in 2020 due to the cancellation of the LMB season because of the COVID-19 pandemic. He later became a free agent.

== Coaching career ==
On July 31, 2020, Ramsey was hired to serve as the head coach at East Hamilton High School.
