= Jaime Barría =

Panamanian baseball player (born 1996)

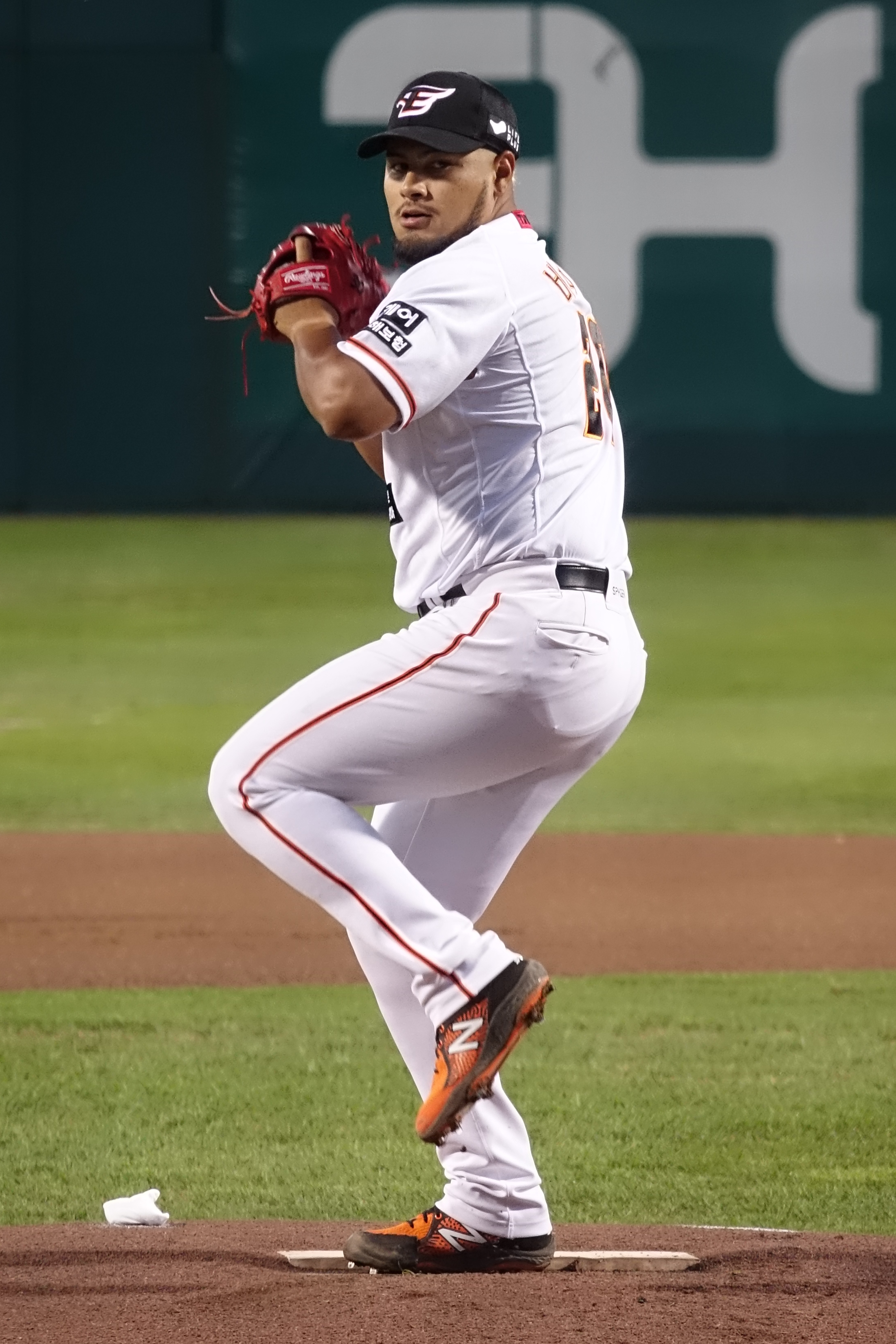
- Barría with the Hanwha Eagles in 2024

Free agent
- Pitcher
- Born: July 18, 1996 (age 30); Panama City, Panama
- Bats: Right Throws: Right

Professional debut
- MLB: April 11, 2018, for the Los Angeles Angels
- KBO: June 5, 2024, for the Hanwha Eagles

MLB statistics (through 2023 season)
- Win–loss record: 22–32
- Earned run average: 4.38
- Strikeouts: 351

KBO statistics (through 2024 season)
- Win–loss record: 6–7
- Earned run average: 5.15
- Strikeouts: 83
- Stats at Baseball Reference

Teams
- Los Angeles Angels (2018–2023); Hanwha Eagles (2024)

Jaime Jonathan Barría Soto (born July 18, 1996) is a Panamanian professional baseball pitcher who is a free agent. He has previously played in Major League Baseball (MLB) for the Los Angeles Angels, and in the KBO League for the Hanwha Eagles. Barría signed with the Angels as an international free agent in 2013.

== Professional career ==
=== Los Angeles Angels ===
==== Minor leagues (2013–2018) ====
Barría signed with the Los Angeles Angels for $60,000 as an international free agent in 2013. He made his debut that same year with the Dominican Summer Angels of the Rookie-level Dominican Summer League, pitching in five innings and giving up six earned runs. He returned there in 2014 where he improved, going 4–4 with a 3.03 earned run average (ERA) in 16 games (eight starts). In 2015 he played for both the Arizona Angels of the Rookie-level Arizona League and the Orem Owlz of the Advanced Rookie-level Pioneer League, pitching to a combined 5–4 record and 4.02 ERA in 15 games (14 starts). He pitched in 2016 for the Burlington Bees of the Single–A Midwest League and was named the Angels' Pitching Prospect of the Year by MLBPipeline.com after he compiled an 8–6 record and 3.85 ERA with a 1.32 WHIP in 25 starts.

Barría began the 2017 season with the Inland Empire 66ers of the High–A California League. The Angels promoted him to the Mobile BayBears of the Double–A Southern League on June 4, and to the Salt Lake Bees of the Triple–A Pacific Coast League for his final three starts of the year. In 26 starts between the three clubs, he went 7–9 with a 2.80 ERA. He was selected to appear in the All-Star Futures Game. The Angels added Barría to their 40-man roster after the season.

Barría began the 2018 season with Salt Lake.

==== Major leagues (2018–2023) ====
After he made one start for the Bees in 2018, the Angels promoted Barría to the major leagues on April 11, 2018, to make his debut against the Texas Rangers.

On April 22, 2018, Barria faced Brandon Belt of the San Francisco Giants who had an at bat that lasted 21 pitches before ending with a fly out to right field, breaking the MLB record for most pitches to a single batter in a single at bat. On the season, Barría started 26 games for the Angels, going 10–9 with a 3.53 ERA with 98 strikeouts in 129 1/3 innings. He was the fifth-youngest player in the AL. In 2020, he went 1–0 in 7 games (5 starts).

On January 13, 2023, Barría signed a one-year, $1.05 million contract with the Angels, avoiding salary arbitration. In 34 appearances for the Angels, he struggled to a 2–6 record and 5.68 ERA with 62 strikeouts in 82 1/3 innings of work. Following the season on October 16, Barría was removed from the 40–man roster and sent outright to Triple–A Salt Lake. He subsequently rejected the assignment and elected free agency.

=== Cleveland Guardians ===
On December 1, 2023, Barría signed a minor league contract with the Cleveland Guardians. In 13 games for the Triple–A Columbus Clippers, Barría compiled a 4.81 ERA with 27 strikeouts across 24 1/3 innings pitched.

=== Hanwha Eagles ===
On May 28, 2024, Barría's contract was sold to the Hanwha Eagles of the KBO League. In 19 starts for Hanwha, Barría posted a 6–7 record with a 5.15 ERA and 83 strikeouts over 92 2/3 innings pitched. On November 30, the Eagles non–tendered Barría, making him a free agent.

=== Algodoneros de Unión Laguna ===
On April 15, 2025, Barria signed with the Algodoneros de Unión Laguna of the Mexican League. In 17 starts, he posted a 6–3 record with a 4.80 ERA and 46 strikeouts across 84 1/3 innings pitched.

Barria made 16 starts for the Algodoneros in 2026, registering a 3–6 record with a 6.23 ERA and 38 strikeouts across 65 innings pitched. On July 15, 2026, Barría was released by Laguna.
