= 2018 Los Angeles Angels season =

Major League Baseball season

2018 Los Angeles Angels
- League: American League
- Division: West
- Ballpark: Angel Stadium
- City: Anaheim, California
- Record: 80–82 (.494)
- Divisional place: 4th
- Owner: Arte Moreno
- Manager: Mike Scioscia
- Television: Fox Sports West (Victor Rojas, Mark Gubicza)
- Radio: KLAA (AM 830); KSPN (AM 710); Angels Radio Network (Terry Smith, Mark Langston, José Mota); Spanish: KWKW (AM 1330)
- Stats: ESPN.com; Baseball Reference

The 2018 Los Angeles Angels season was the 58th season of the Angels franchise and the 53rd in Anaheim (all of them at Angel Stadium). The Angels began the season on March 29 against the Oakland Athletics and ended the season on September 30 also against the A's. Manager Mike Scioscia retired at the end of the season. It was also two-way player Shohei Ohtani's first season with the club.

== Offseason ==
On December 9, 2017, the Angels signed RHP/OF Shohei Ohtani from Japan to a minor league contract with a $2.315 million signing bonus. He made the major league roster.

On December 13, 2017, the Angels traded minor leaguers Troy Montgomery and Wilkel Hernandez to the Detroit Tigers for 2B Ian Kinsler. Two days later, the Angels signed Zack Cozart to a three-year, $38 million contract. Cozart is expected to play third base.

On February 21, 2018, the Angels acquired Jabari Blash from the New York Yankees in exchange for a player to be named later or cash considerations.

== Regular season ==
=== Season standings ===
==== American League West ====
AL West
Team	W	L	Pct.	GB	Home	Road
Houston Astros	103	59	.636	—	46‍–‍35	57‍–‍24
Oakland Athletics	97	65	.599	6	50‍–‍31	47‍–‍34
Seattle Mariners	89	73	.549	14	45‍–‍36	44‍–‍37
Los Angeles Angels	80	82	.494	23	42‍–‍39	38‍–‍43
Texas Rangers	67	95	.414	36	34‍–‍47	33‍–‍48

==== American League leaders ====
Division leaders
Team	W	L	Pct.
Boston Red Sox	108	54	.667
Houston Astros	103	59	.636
Cleveland Indians	91	71	.562

Wild Card teams (Top 2 teams qualify for postseason)
Team	W	L	Pct.	GB
New York Yankees	100	62	.617	+3
Oakland Athletics	97	65	.599	—
Tampa Bay Rays	90	72	.556	7
Seattle Mariners	89	73	.549	8
Los Angeles Angels	80	82	.494	17
Minnesota Twins	78	84	.481	19
Toronto Blue Jays	73	89	.451	24
Texas Rangers	67	95	.414	30
Detroit Tigers	64	98	.395	33
Chicago White Sox	62	100	.383	35
Kansas City Royals	58	104	.358	39
Baltimore Orioles	47	115	.290	50

=== Game log ===
2018 Game Log: 80–82 (Home: 42–39; Away: 38–43)
March: 2–1 (Home: 0–0; Away: 2–1)

#	Date	Opponent	Score	Win	Loss	Save	Attendance	Record	Streak
1	March 29	@ Athletics	5–6 (11)	Hatcher (1–0)	**Ramirez** (0–1)	—	27,764	0–1	L1
2	March 30	@ Athletics	2–1	**Skaggs** (1–0)	Manaea (0–1)	**Parker** (1)	27,665	1–1	W1
3	March 31	@ Athletics	8–3	**Shoemaker** (1–0)	Mengden (0–1)	—	17,012	2–1	W2

April: 14–11 (Home: 5–10; Away: 9–1)

#	Date	Opponent	Score	Win	Loss	Save	Attendance	Record	Streak
4	April 1	@ Athletics	7–4	**Ohtani** (1–0)	Gossett (0–1)	**Middleton** (1)	14,644	3–1	W3
5	April 2	Indians	0–6	Clevinger (1–0)	**Ramírez** (0–1)	—	43,904	3–2	L1
6	April 3	Indians	13–2	**Richards** (1–0)	Tomlin (0–1)	—	35,007	4–2	W1
7	April 4	Indians	3–2 (13)	**Ramirez** (1–1)	McAllister (0–1)	—	32,412	5–2	W2
8	April 6	Athletics	13–9	**Johnson** (1–0)	Treinen (0–1)	—	36,023	6–2	W3
9	April 7	Athletics	3–7	Triggs (1–0)	**Ramírez** (1–2)	Treinen (2)	40,129	6–3	L1
10	April 8	Athletics	6–1	**Ohtani** (2–0)	Graveman (0–2)	—	44,742	7–3	W1
11	April 9	@ Rangers	8–3	**Álvarez** (1–0)	Fister (1–2)	—	16,718	8–3	W2
12	April 10	@ Rangers	11–1	**Skaggs** (2–0)	Perez (1–1)	—	18,697	9–3	W3
13	April 11	@ Rangers	7–2	**Barría** (1–0)	Moore (0–3)	**Middleton** (2)	20,363	10–3	W4
14	April 12	@ Royals	7–1	**Tropeano** (1–0)	Kennedy (1–1)	—	14,714	11–3	W5
15	April 13	@ Royals	5–4	**Wood** (1–0)	Grimm (0–2)	**Middleton** (3)	15,011	12–3	W6
16	April 14	@ Royals	5–3	**Richards** (2–0)	Junis (2–1)	**Middleton** (4)	15,876	13–3	W7
—	April 15	@ Royals	**Postponed (inclement weather)** (Makeup date: June 25)						
17	April 17	Red Sox	1–10	Price (2–1)	**Ohtani** (2–1)	—	44,822	13–4	L1
18	April 18	Red Sox	0–9	Porcello (4–0)	**Skaggs** (2–1)	—	34,508	13–5	L2
19	April 19	Red Sox	2–8	Rodríguez (2–0)	**Tropeano** (1–1)	—	36,253	13–6	L3
20	April 20	Giants	1–8	Samardzija (1–0)	**Heaney** (0–1)	—	37,494	13–7	L4
21	April 21	Giants	4–3	**Richards** (3–0)	Holland (0–3)	**Middleton** (5)	42,666	14–7	W1
22	April 22	Giants	2–4	Cueto (2–0)	**Barría** (1–1)	Strickland (3)	44,544	14–8	L1
23	April 23	@ Astros	2–0	**Skaggs** (3–1)	Cole (2–1)	**Middleton** (6)	29,606	15–8	W1
24	April 24	@ Astros	8–7	**Johnson** (2–0)	Smith (1–1)	**Bedrosian** (1)	36,457	16–8	W2
25	April 25	@ Astros	2–5	Verlander (4–0)	**Tropeano** (1–2)	Giles (2)	29,777	16–9	L1
26	April 27	Yankees	3–4	Robertson (1–1)	**Parker** (0–1)	Chapman (5)	40,416	16–10	L2
27	April 28	Yankees	1–11	Tanaka (4–2)	**Richards** (3–1)	—	44,649	16–11	L3
28	April 29	Yankees	1–2	Sabathia (2–0)	**Skaggs** (3–2)	Chapman (6)	44,593	16–12	L4

May: 14–15 (Home: 7–7; Away: 7–8)

#	Date	Opponent	Score	Win	Loss	Save	Attendance	Record	Streak
29	May 1	Orioles	3–2	**Bedrosian** (1–0)	Brach (0–1)	—	32,345	17–12	W1
30	May 2	Orioles	10–7	**Heaney** (1–1)	Bundy (1–4)	—	32,156	18–12	W2
31	May 3	Orioles	12–3	**Barría** (2–1)	Tillman (1–5)	—	35,879	19–12	W3
32	May 4	@ Mariners	5–0	**Richards** (4–1)	Leake (3–3)	—	41,705	20–12	W4
33	May 5	@ Mariners	8–9 (11)	Goeddel (1–0)	**Johnson** (2–1)	—	36,977	20–13	L1
34	May 6	@ Mariners	8–2	**Ohtani** (3–1)	Hernández (4–3)	—	40,142	21–13	W1
35	May 8	@ Rockies	2–4	Gray (4–4)	**Heaney** (1–2)	Davis (14)	33,144	21–14	L1
36	May 9	@ Rockies	8–0	**Barría** (3–1)	Anderson (2–1)	—	33,689	22–14	W1
37	May 10	Twins	7–4	**Álvarez** (2–0)	Berríos (3–4)	**Johnson** (1)	30,127	23–14	W2
38	May 11	Twins	4–5	Magill (1–0)	**Anderson** (0–1)	Rodney (6)	43,521	23–15	L1
39	May 12	Twins	3–5 (12)	Hildenberger (1–0)	**Ramirez** (1–2)	Rodney (7)	40,117	23–16	L2
40	May 13	Twins	2–1	**Parker** (1–1)	Duke (2–2)	—	38,029	24–16	W1
41	May 14	Astros	2–1	**Heaney** (2–2)	McCullers (5–2)	**Anderson** (1)	28,229	25–16	W2
42	May 15	Astros	3–5	McHugh (1-0)	**Álvarez** (2–1)	Giles (6)	28,358	25–17	L1
43	May 16	Astros	0–2	Verlander (5–2)	**Richards** (4–2)	—	28,078	25–18	L2
44	May 17	Rays	1–7	Archer (3–3)	**Skaggs** (3–3)	—	30,487	25–19	L3
45	May 18	Rays	3–8	Snell (5–3)	**Tropeano** (1–3)	—	40,067	25–20	L4
46	May 19	Rays	3–5	Yarbrough (4–2)	**Heaney** (2–3)	Colomé (10)	37,232	25–21	L5
47	May 20	Rays	5–2	**Ohtani** (4–1)	Andriese (1–2)	**Parker** (2)	38,560	26–21	W1
48	May 22	@ Jays	3–5	Happ (6–3)	**Richards** (4–3)	Clippard (2)	21,480	26–22	L1
49	May 23	@ Jays	5–4	**Anderson** (1–1)	Clippard (4–2)	**Parker** (3)	25,504	27–22	W1
50	May 24	@ Jays	8–1	**Tropeano** (2–3)	Estrada (2–5)	—	43,344	28–22	W2
51	May 25	@ Yankees	1–2	Green (3–0)	**Johnson** (2–2)	Chapman (10)	46,056	28–23	L1
52	May 26	@ Yankees	11–4	**Barría** (4–1)	Gray (3–4)	—	44,565	29–23	W1
53	May 27	@ Yankees	1–3	Tanaka (6–2)	**Richards** (4–4)	Chapman (11)	46,109	29–24	L1
54	May 28	@ Tigers	3–9	Boyd (3–4)	**Skaggs** (3–4)	—	20,857	29–25	L2
55	May 29	@ Tigers	9–2	**Tropeano** (3–3)	Fulmer (2–4)	—	17,397	30–25	W1
56	May 30	@ Tigers	1–6	Coleman (2–0)	**Bedrosian** (1–1)	—	19,494	30–26	L1
57	May 31	@ Tigers	2–6	Saupold (3–1)	**Heaney** (2–4)	—	24,696	30–27	L2

June: 13–14 (Home: 8–4; Away: 5–10)

#	Date	Opponent	Score	Win	Loss	Save	Attendance	Record	Streak
58	June 1	Rangers	6–0	**Barría** (5–1)	Colón (2–3)	—	33,511	31–27	W1
59	June 2	Rangers	2–3 (10)	Diekman (1–0)	**Álvarez** (2–2)	Kela (13)	44,603	31–28	L1
60	June 3	Rangers	3–1	**Skaggs** (4–4)	Fister (1–6)	**Anderson** (2)	33,541	32–28	W1
61	June 4	Royals	9–6	**Bedrosian** (2–1)	Hill (1–2)	**Parker** (4)	32,553	33–28	W2
62	June 5	Royals	1–0	**Heaney** (3–4)	Keller (1–2)	—	31,514	34–28	W3
63	June 6	Royals	4–3	**Bedrosian** (3–1)	Barlow (1–1)	**Parker** (5)	36,512	35–28	W4
64	June 8	@ Twins	4–2	**Ramirez** (2–2)	Pressly (0–1)	**Parker** (6)	28,383	36–28	W5
65	June 9	@ Twins	2–1	**Skaggs** (5–4)	Gibson (1–4)	**Parker** (7)	24,061	37–28	W6
66	June 10	@ Twins	5–7	Romero (3–2)	**Tropeano** (3–4)	—	28,656	37–29	L1
67	June 11	@ Mariners	3–5	LeBlanc (2–0)	**Heaney** (3–5)	Díaz (24)	20,116	37–30	L2
68	June 12	@ Mariners	3–6	Leake (7–3)	**Barría** (5–2)	Díaz (25)	20,402	37–31	L3
69	June 13	@ Mariners	6–8	Elías (2–0)	**Drake** (1–1)	—	28,236	37–32	L4
70	June 15	@ Athletics	8–4	**Skaggs** (6–4)	Bassitt (0–2)	—	18,356	38–32	W1
71	June 16	@ Athletics	4–6	Manaea (6–6)	**Ramirez** (2–3)	Treinen (15)	19,185	38–33	L1
72	June 17	@ Athletics	5–6	Treinen (4–1)	**Jewell** (0–1)	—	21,217	38–34	L2
73	June 18	Diamondbacks	4–7	Greinke (6–5)	**Barría** (5–3)	Bradley (3)	33,809	38–35	L3
74	June 19	Diamondbacks	5–4	**Álvarez** (3–2)	Koch (5–4)	**Parker** (8)	33,088	39–35	W1
75	June 21	Blue Jays	8–5	**Ramirez** (3–3)	Axford (1–1)	**Anderson** (3)	30,416	40–35	W2
76	June 22	Blue Jays	2–1	**Heaney** (4–5)	Estrada (4–7)	**Parker** (9)	38,028	41–35	W3
77	June 23	Blue Jays	1–4	Oh (3–2)	**Anderson** (1–2)	Tepera (6)	40,612	41–36	L1
78	June 24	Blue Jays	6–7	Tepera (5–2)	**Robles** (2–3)	Clippard (4)	33,102	41–37	L2
79	June 25	@ Royals	0–2	Keller (2–2)	**Skaggs** (6–5)	Peralta (1)	19,535	41–38	L3
80	June 26	@ Red Sox	1–9	Price (9–5)	**Lamb** (0–1)	—	37,366	41–39	L4
81	June 27	@ Red Sox	6–9	Barnes (2–2)	**Álvarez** (3–3)	Kimbrel (23)	37,521	41–40	L5
82	June 28	@ Red Sox	2–4	Velázquez (6–0)	**Barría** (5–4)	Kimbrel (24)	36,992	41–41	L6
83	June 29	@ Orioles	7–1	**Peña** (1–0)	Hess (2-5)	—	24,007	42–41	W1
84	June 30	@ Orioles	6–2	**Anderson** (2–2)	Givens (0–6)	—	38,838	43–41	W2

July: 11–13 (Home: 9–7; Away: 2–6)

#	Date	Opponent	Score	Win	Loss	Save	Attendance	Record	Streak
85	July 1	@ Orioles	2–8	Gausman (4–6)	**McGuire** (0–1)	—	18,351	43–42	L1
86	July 3	@ Mariners	1–4	LeBlanc (4–0)	**Heaney** (4–6)	Díaz (33)	38,624	43–43	L2
87	July 4	@ Mariners	7–4	**Richards** (5–4)	Leake (8–5)	**Parker** (10)	39,518	44–43	W1
88	July 5	@ Mariners	1–4	Gonzales (9–5)	**Barría** (5–5)	Díaz (34)	32,128	44–44	L1
89	July 6	Dodgers	3–2	**Parker** (2–1)	Jansen (0–2)	—	44,323	45–44	W1
90	July 7	Dodgers	1–3	Stripling (7–2)	**Cole** (0–1)	Jansen (24)	44,409	45–45	L1
91	July 8	Dodgers	4–3	**Heaney** (5–6)	Chargois (2–2)	**Anderson** (4)	42,213	46–45	W1
92	July 10	Mariners	9–3	**Ramirez** (4–3)	Leake (8–6)	—	33,092	47–45	W2
93	July 11	Mariners	0–3	Gonzales (10–5)	**Barría** (5–6)	Díaz (36)	35,591	47–46	L1
94	July 12	Mariners	11–2	**Skaggs** (7–5)	Paxton (8–4)	—	44,027	48–46	W1
95	July 13	@ Dodgers	2–3	Ferguson (2–1)	**Bedrosian** (3–2)	Alexander (1)	53,368	48–47	L1
96	July 14	@ Dodgers	5–4	**Álvarez** (4–3)	Jansen (0–3)	—	53,797	49–47	W1
97	July 15	@ Dodgers	3–5	Maeda (7–5)	**Cole** (0–2)	Jansen (27)	47,871	49–48	L1
**89th All-Star Game in Washington, D.C.**
98	July 20	Astros	1–3	Keuchel (8–8)	**Skaggs** (7–6)	Rondón (9)	42,422	49–49	L2
99	July 21	Astros	0–7	Verlander (10–5)	**Tropeano** (3–5)	—	44,264	49–50	L3
100	July 22	Astros	14–5	**Heaney** (6–6)	McCullers (10–5)	—	35,298	50–50	W1
101	July 23	White Sox	3–5	Giolito (7–8)	**Barría** (5–7)	Soria (15)	35,285	50–51	L1
102	July 24	White Sox	2–4	Rodon (3–3)	**Peña** (1–1)	Soria (16)	33,937	50–52	L2
103	July 25	White Sox	11–3	**Skaggs** (8–6)	Shields (4–12)	—	34,321	51–52	W1
104	July 26	White Sox	12–8	**Tropeano** (4–5)	Covey (4–6)	—	33,826	52–52	W2
105	July 27	Mariners	4–3	**Johnson** (3–2)	Nicasio (1–5)	—	42,336	53–52	W3
106	July 28	Mariners	11–5	**Barría** (6–7)	Hernández (8–9)	—	43,325	54–52	W4
107	July 29	Mariners	5–8	Gonzales (12–5)	**Peña** (1–2)	Díaz (39)	35,396	54–53	L1
108	July 31	@ Rays	6–10	Yarbrough (10–5)	**Skaggs** (8–7)	—	15,858	54–54	L2

August: 12–15 (Home: 5–6; Away: 7–9)

#	Date	Opponent	Score	Win	Loss	Save	Attendance	Record	Streak
109	August 1	@ Rays	2–7	Faria (4–3)	**Tropeano** (4–6)	—	9,132	54–55	L3
110	August 2	@ Rays	2–4	Beeks (1–1)	**Heaney** (6–7)	Romo (13)	10,988	54–56	L4
111	August 3	@ Indians	7–4	**Anderson** (3–2)	Pérez (0–1)	—	35,242	55–56	W1
112	August 4	@ Indians	0–3	Kluber (14–6)	**Peña** (1–3)	—	34,814	55–57	L1
113	August 5	@ Indians	3–4	Bieber (6–2)	**McGuire** (0–2)	Hand (27)	28,993	55–58	L2
114	August 6	Tigers	6–2	**Tropeano** (5–6)	Boyd (6–10)	—	34,073	56–58	W1
115	August 7	Tigers	11–5	**Heaney** (7–7)	Turner (0–1)	—	35,824	57–58	W2
116	August 8	Tigers	6–0	**Barría** (7–7)	Hardy (4–4)	—	38,832	58–58	W3
117	August 10	Athletics	4–3	**Johnson** (4–2)	Trivino (8–2)	**Parker** (11)	42,722	59–58	W4
118	August 11	Athletics	0–7	Jackson (4–2)	**Skaggs** (8–8)	—	39,425	59–59	L1
119	August 12	Athletics	7–8	Rodney (4–2)	**Johnson** (4–3)	Treinen (30)	38,364	59–60	L2
120	August 13	@ Padres	6–3	**Bedrosian** (4–2)	Stammen (5–2)	—	22,609	60–60	W1
121	August 14	@ Padres	7–3	**Barría** (8–7)	Kennedy (0–2)	—	21,747	61–60	W2
122	August 15	@ Padres	3–2	**Álvarez** (5–3)	Yates (4–1)	**Parker** (12)	22,851	62–60	W3
123	August 16	@ Rangers	6–8	Moore (2–6)	**Anderson** (3–3)	Leclerc (3)	18,398	62–61	L1
124	August 17	@ Rangers	4–6	Hutchison (2–2)	**Despaigne** (2–1)	Leclerc (4)	27,816	62–62	L2
125	August 18	@ Rangers	11–7	**Bedrosian** (5–2)	Butler (2–3)	—	24,768	63–62	W1
126	August 19	@ Rangers	2–4	Moore (3–6)	**Ramirez** (4–4)	Leclerc (5)	26,681	63–63	L1
127	August 21	@ Diamondbacks	4–5	Boxberger (2–4)	**Bedrosian** (5–3)	—	30,420	63–64	L2
128	August 22	@ Diamondbacks	1–5	Buchholz (7–2)	**Despaigne** (2–2)	—	23,584	63–65	L3
129	August 24	Astros	3–9	Keuchel (10–10)	**Heaney** (7–8)	—	42,788	63–66	L4
130	August 25	Astros	3–8	Verlander (13–8)	**Barría** (8–8)	—	41,654	63–67	L5
131	August 26	Astros	1–3	Valdez (2–0)	**Peña** (1–4)	Osuna (11)	37,530	63–68	L6
132	August 27	Rockies	10–7	**Johnson** (5–3)	Ottavino (6–3)	**Ramirez** (1)	35,305	64–68	W1
133	August 28	Rockies	2–3	Freeland (12–7)	**Ramirez** (4–5)	Davis (36)	35,207	64–69	L1
134	August 30	@ Astros	5–2	**Heaney** (8–8)	Verlander (13–9)	—	30,371	65–69	W1
135	August 31	@ Astros	3–0	**Barría** (9–8)	Valdez (2–1)	**Parker** (13)	35,675	66–69	W2

September: 14–13 (Home: 8–5; Away: 6–8)

#	Date	Opponent	Score	Win	Loss	Save	Attendance	Record	Streak
136	September 1	@ Astros	3–7	Smith (5–1)	**Bedrosian** (5–4)	—	41,622	66–70	L1
137	September 2	@ Astros	2–4	Cole (13–5)	**Ohtani** (4–2)	Osuna (12)	41,506	66–71	L2
138	September 3	@ Rangers	3–1	**Cole** (1–2)	Curtis (0–1)	**Parker** (14)	21,048	67–71	W1
139	September 4	@ Rangers	2–4	Minor (11–7)	**Heaney** (8–9)	Leclerc (9)	17,625	67–72	L1
140	September 5	@ Rangers	9–3	**Barría** (10–8)	Colón (7–12)	—	19,966	68–72	W1
141	September 7	@ White Sox	5–2	**Peña** (2–4)	Rodón (6–5)	**Buttrey** (1)	18,236	69–72	W2
142	September 8	@ White Sox	12–3	**Shoemaker** (2–0)	Shields (6–16)	—	27,146	70–72	W3
143	September 9	@ White Sox	1–0	**Heaney** (9–9)	Hamilton (0–1)	**Álvarez** (1)	24,020	71–72	W4
144	September 10	Rangers	2–5	Minor (12–7)	**Barría** (10–9)	Leclerc (10)	32,891	71–73	L1
145	September 11	Rangers	1–0	**Ramirez** (5–5)	Sampson (0–1)	**Buttrey** (2)	33,756	72–73	W1
146	September 12	Rangers	8–1	**Peña** (3–4)	Gallardo (8–5)	—	33,028	73–73	W2
147	September 13	Mariners	2–8	Leake (10–9)	**Despaigne** (2–3)	—	33,328	73–74	L1
148	September 14	Mariners	0–5	Warren (3–2)	**Shoemaker** (2–1)	—	39,872	73–75	L2
149	September 15	Mariners	5–6	Pazos (4–1)	**Álvarez** (5–4)	Díaz (55)	42,292	73–76	L3
150	September 16	Mariners	4–3	**Cole** (2–2)	Vincent (3–4)	**Buttrey** (3)	35,578	74–76	W1
151	September 18	@ Athletics	9–7	**Ramirez** (6–5)	Trivino (8–3)	**Buttrey** (4)	15,031	75–76	W2
152	September 19	@ Athletics	0–10	Anderson (4–5)	**Peña** (3–5)	—	16,425	75–77	L1
153	September 20	@ Athletics	3–21	Jackson (6–3)	**Shoemaker** (2–2)	—	17,217	75–78	L2
154	September 21	@ Astros	3–11	Cole (15–5)	**Heaney** (9–10)	—	39,977	75–79	L3
155	September 22	@ Astros	5–10	McHugh (6–2)	**Buttrey** (0–1)	—	41,822	75–80	L4
156	September 23	@ Astros	2–6	Valdez (4–1)	**Skaggs** (8–9)	—	43,247	75–81	L5
157	September 24	Rangers	5–4 (11)	**Cole** (3–2)	Moore (3–8)	—	29,052	76–81	W1
158	September 25	Rangers	4–1	**Ramirez** (7–5)	Gallardo (8–7)	**Robles** (1)	36,308	77–81	W2
159	September 26	Rangers	3–2	**Álvarez** (6–4)	Martin (1–5)	**Johnson** (2)	35,991	78–81	W3
160	September 28	Athletics	8–5	**Cole** (4–2)	Fiers (12–8)	**Robles** (2)	35,041	79–81	W4
161	September 29	Athletics	2–5	Cahill (7–4)	**Skaggs** (8–10)	Treinen (38)	43,762	79–82	L1
162	September 30	Athletics	5–4	**Bridwell** (1–0)	Hatcher (3–3)	—	36,892	80–82	W1

Legend: = Win = Loss = Postponement
Bold = Angels team member

=== Record against opponents ===
2018 American League record Source: MLB Standings Grid – 2018
Team	BAL	BOS	CWS	CLE	DET	HOU	KC	LAA	MIN	NYY	OAK	SEA	TB	TEX	TOR	NL
Baltimore	—	3–16	3–4	2–5	2–4	1–6	2–4	1–5	1–6	7–12	1–5	1–6	8–11	3–4	5–14	7–13
Boston	16–3	—	3–4	3–4	4–2	3–4	5–1	6–0	4–3	10–9	2–4	4–3	11–8	6–1	15–4	16–4
Chicago	4–3	4–3	—	5–14	7–12	0–7	11–8	2–5	7–12	2–4	2–5	2–4	4–2	4–3	2–4	6–14
Cleveland	5–2	4–3	14–5	—	13–6	3–4	12–7	3–3	10–9	2–5	2–4	2–5	2–4	4–2	3–4	12–8
Detroit	4–2	2–4	12–7	6–13	—	1–5	8–11	3–4	7–12	3–4	0–7	3–4	2–4	3–4	4–3	6–14
Houston	6–1	4–3	7–0	4–3	5–1	—	5–1	13–6	4–2	2–5	12–7	9–10	3–4	12–7	4–2	13–7
Kansas City	4–2	1–5	8–11	7–12	11–8	1–5	—	1–6	10–9	2–5	2–5	1–5	0–7	2–5	2–5	6–14
Los Angeles	5–1	0–6	5–2	3–3	4–3	6–13	6–1	—	4–3	1–5	10–9	8–11	1–6	13–6	4–3	10–10
Minnesota	6–1	3–4	12–7	9–10	12–7	2–4	9–10	3–4	—	2–5	2–5	1–5	3–4	2–4	4–2	8–12
New York	12–7	9–10	4–2	5–2	4–3	5–2	5–2	5–1	5–2	—	3–3	5–1	10–9	4–3	13–6	11–9
Oakland	5–1	4–2	5–2	4–2	7–0	7–12	5–2	9–10	5–2	3–3	—	9–10	2–5	13–6	7–0	12–8
Seattle	6–1	3–4	4–2	5–2	4–3	10–9	5–1	11–8	5–1	1–5	10–9	—	6–1	10–9	3–4	6–14
Tampa Bay	11–8	8–11	2–4	4–2	4–2	4–3	7–0	6–1	4–3	9–10	5–2	1–6	—	5–1	13–6	7–13
Texas	4–3	1–6	3–4	2–4	4–3	7–12	5–2	6–13	4–2	3–4	6–13	9–10	1–5	—	3–3	9–11
Toronto	14–5	4–15	4–2	4–3	3–4	2–4	5–2	3–4	2–4	6–13	0–7	4–3	6–13	3–3	—	13–7

== Roster ==
2018 Los Angeles Angels
Roster
Pitchers: 49 Miguel Almonte; 48 José Álvarez; 38 Justin Anderson; 65 Luke Bard; 51 Jaime Barría; 32 Cam Bedrosian; 62 Parker Bridwell; 31 Ty Buttrey; 67 Taylor Cole; 40 Odrisamer Despaigne; 36 Oliver Drake; 28 Andrew Heaney; 36 Williams Jerez; 65 Jake Jewell; 33 Jim Johnson; 47 Ian Krol; 46 John Lamb; 68 Deck McGuire; 39 Keynan Middleton; 73 Osmer Morales; 58 Akeel Morris; 17 Shohei Ohtani; 60 Eduardo Paredes; 53 Blake Parker; 64 Félix Peña; 66 J. C. Ramírez; 25 Noe Ramirez; 43 Garrett Richards; 57 Hansel Robles; 52 Matt Shoemaker; 45 Tyler Skaggs; 47 Junichi Tazawa; 35 Nick Tropeano; 46 Blake Wood	Catchers: 37 Francisco Arcia; 10 José Briceño; 13 Juan Graterol; 44 Joe Hudson; 12 Martín Maldonado; 44 René Rivera; Infielders: 7 Zack Cozart; 22 Kaleb Cowart; 20 José Fernández; 6 David Fletcher; 16 Nolan Fontana; 18 Sherman Johnson; 3 Ian Kinsler; 19 Jefry Marté; 5 Albert Pujols; 20 Ryan Schimpf; 2 Andrelton Simmons; 18 Luis Valbuena; 3 Taylor Ward	Outfielders: 54 Jabari Blash; 56 Kole Calhoun; 59 Michael Hermosillo; 27 Mike Trout; 8 Justin Upton; 24 Chris Young; 9 Eric Young	Manager: 14 Mike Scioscia; Coaches: 92 Anel De Los Santos (bullpen catcher); 21 Dino Ebel (third base); 70 Tom Gregorio (bullpen catcher); 4 Alfredo Griffin (first base); 77 Eric Hinske (hitting); 41 Charles Nagy (pitching); 88 Josh Paul (bench); 63 Scott Radinsky (bullpen); 61 Steve Soliz (catching/player information); 55 Paul Sorrento (assistant hitting)

== Player stats ==
=== Batting ===
Note: G = Games played; AB = At bats; R = Runs; H = Hits; 2B = Doubles; 3B = Triples; HR = Home runs; RBI = Runs batted in; SB = Stolen bases; BB = Walks; AVG = Batting average; SLG = Slugging average

Player	G	AB	R	H	2B	3B	HR	RBI	SB	BB	AVG	SLG
Andrelton Simmons	146	554	68	162	26	5	11	75	10	35	.292	.417
Justin Upton	145	533	80	137	18	1	30	85	8	64	.257	.463
Kole Calhoun	137	491	71	102	18	2	19	57	6	53	.208	.369
Mike Trout	140	471	101	147	24	4	39	79	24	122	.312	.628
Albert Pujols	117	465	50	114	20	0	19	64	1	28	.245	.411
Ian Kinsler	91	355	49	85	20	0	13	32	9	30	.239	.406
Shohei Ohtani	104	326	59	93	21	2	22	61	10	37	.285	.564
David Fletcher	80	284	35	78	18	2	1	25	3	15	.275	.363
Luis Valbuena	96	266	23	53	9	0	9	33	3	19	.199	.335
Martín Maldonado	78	265	24	59	14	0	5	32	0	13	.223	.332
Zack Cozart	58	224	29	49	13	2	5	18	0	19	.219	.362
Jefry Marte	90	194	28	42	7	1	7	22	1	13	.216	.371
Taylor Ward	40	135	14	24	3	0	6	15	2	9	.178	.333
José Briceño	46	117	12	28	2	0	5	10	0	8	.239	.385
José Miguel Fernández	36	116	9	31	8	0	2	11	1	6	.267	.388
Chris Young	56	113	17	19	2	1	6	13	2	11	.168	.363
Kaleb Cowart	47	112	7	15	7	1	1	10	1	10	.134	.241
Eric Young Jr.	41	109	12	22	4	2	1	8	5	6	.202	.303
Francisco Arcia	40	103	10	21	5	0	6	23	1	1	.204	.427
René Rivera	30	82	8	20	4	0	4	11	0	4	.244	.439
Michael Hermosillo	31	57	7	12	4	0	1	1	0	3	.211	.333
Jabari Blash	24	39	4	4	1	0	0	1	2	5	.103	.128
Joe Hudson	8	12	0	2	1	0	0	1	0	0	.167	.250
Nolan Fontana	8	11	1	1	0	0	1	1	0	1	.091	.364
Sherman Johnson	10	10	0	0	0	0	0	0	0	0	.000	.000
Ryan Schimpf	5	5	2	1	0	0	1	2	0	2	.200	.800
Juan Graterol	1	1	0	1	0	0	0	0	0	0	1.000	1.000
Pitcher totals	162	22	1	1	0	0	0	0	0	0	.045	.045
Team totals	162	5472	721	1323	249	23	214	690	89	514	.242	.413

=== Pitching ===
Note: W = Wins; L = Losses; ERA = Earned run average; G = Games pitched; GS = Games started; SV = Saves; IP = Innings pitched; H = Hits allowed; R = Runs allowed; ER = Earned runs allowed; BB = Walks allowed; SO = Strikeouts

Player	W	L	ERA	G	GS	SV	IP	H	R	ER	BB	SO
Andrew Heaney	9	10	4.15	30	30	0	180.0	171	91	83	45	180
Jaime Barría	10	9	3.41	26	26	0	129.1	117	50	49	47	98
Tyler Skaggs	8	10	4.02	24	24	0	125.1	127	60	56	40	129
Félix Peña	3	5	4.18	19	17	0	92.2	87	45	43	28	85
Noé Ramirez	7	5	4.54	69	1	1	83.1	75	43	42	30	95
Garrett Richards	5	4	3.66	16	16	0	76.1	64	43	31	34	87
Nick Tropeano	5	6	4.74	14	14	0	76.0	68	41	40	31	64
Blake Parker	2	1	3.26	67	0	14	66.1	63	24	24	19	70
Cam Bedrosian	5	4	3.80	71	0	1	64.0	63	30	27	26	57
Jim Johnson	5	3	3.84	62	1	2	63.1	64	38	27	22	45
José Álvarez	6	4	2.71	76	0	1	63.0	51	20	19	22	59
Justin Anderson	3	3	4.07	57	0	4	55.1	42	25	25	40	67
Shohei Ohtani	4	2	3.31	10	10	0	51.2	38	19	19	22	63
Hansel Robles	0	1	2.97	37	0	2	36.1	32	15	12	15	36
Taylor Cole	4	2	2.75	18	2	0	36.0	20	11	11	12	39
Matt Shoemaker	2	2	4.94	7	7	0	31.0	29	17	17	10	33
Deck McGuire	0	2	6.07	17	4	0	29.2	29	22	20	21	26
Odrisamer Despaigne	0	3	8.20	8	4	0	18.2	30	18	17	11	17
Eduardo Paredes	0	0	6.87	14	0	0	18.1	25	14	14	7	15
Keynan Middleton	0	0	2.04	16	0	6	17.2	14	4	4	9	16
Ty Buttrey	0	1	3.31	16	0	4	16.1	15	7	6	5	20
Williams Jerez	0	0	6.00	17	0	0	15.0	17	14	10	8	15
Akeel Morris	0	0	5.79	9	0	0	14.0	18	9	9	8	7
Luke Bard	0	0	5.40	8	0	0	11.2	10	7	7	5	13
Blake Wood	1	0	2.31	13	0	0	11.2	8	3	3	7	10
John Lamb	0	1	7.20	3	3	0	10.0	15	10	8	4	11
Oliver Drake	0	1	5.19	8	0	0	8.2	15	5	5	1	8
Junichi Tazawa	0	0	2.25	9	0	0	8.0	7	3	2	3	4
Miguel Almonte	0	0	10.29	8	0	0	7.0	9	8	8	3	7
J. C. Ramírez	0	2	9.45	2	2	0	6.2	7	8	7	7	4
Parker Bridwell	1	0	17.55	5	1	0	6.2	14	13	13	2	3
Francisco Arcia	0	0	9.00	2	0	0	3.0	5	3	3	0	0
Ian Krol	0	0	0.00	1	0	0	2.0	1	0	0	1	2
Jake Jewell	0	1	9.00	3	0	0	2.0	2	2	2	1	1
Osmer Morales	0	0	0.00	1	0	0	0.1	1	0	0	0	0
Team totals	80	82	4.15	162	162	35	1437.1	1353	722	662	546	1386

== Farm system ==
Level	Team	League	Manager
AAA	Salt Lake Bees	Pacific Coast League	
AA	Mobile BayBears	Southern League	
A-Advanced	Inland Empire 66ers	California League	
A	Burlington Bees	Midwest League	
Rookie	Orem Owlz	Pioneer League	
Rookie	AZL Angels	Arizona League	
Rookie	DSL Angels	Dominican Summer League	

All coaches and rosters can be found on each team's website.

== See also ==
- Los Angeles Angels
- Angel Stadium

Records
Preceded by 2017	Los Angeles Angels seasons 2018	Succeeded by 2019
