= Joe Hudson (catcher) =

American baseball player (born 1991)

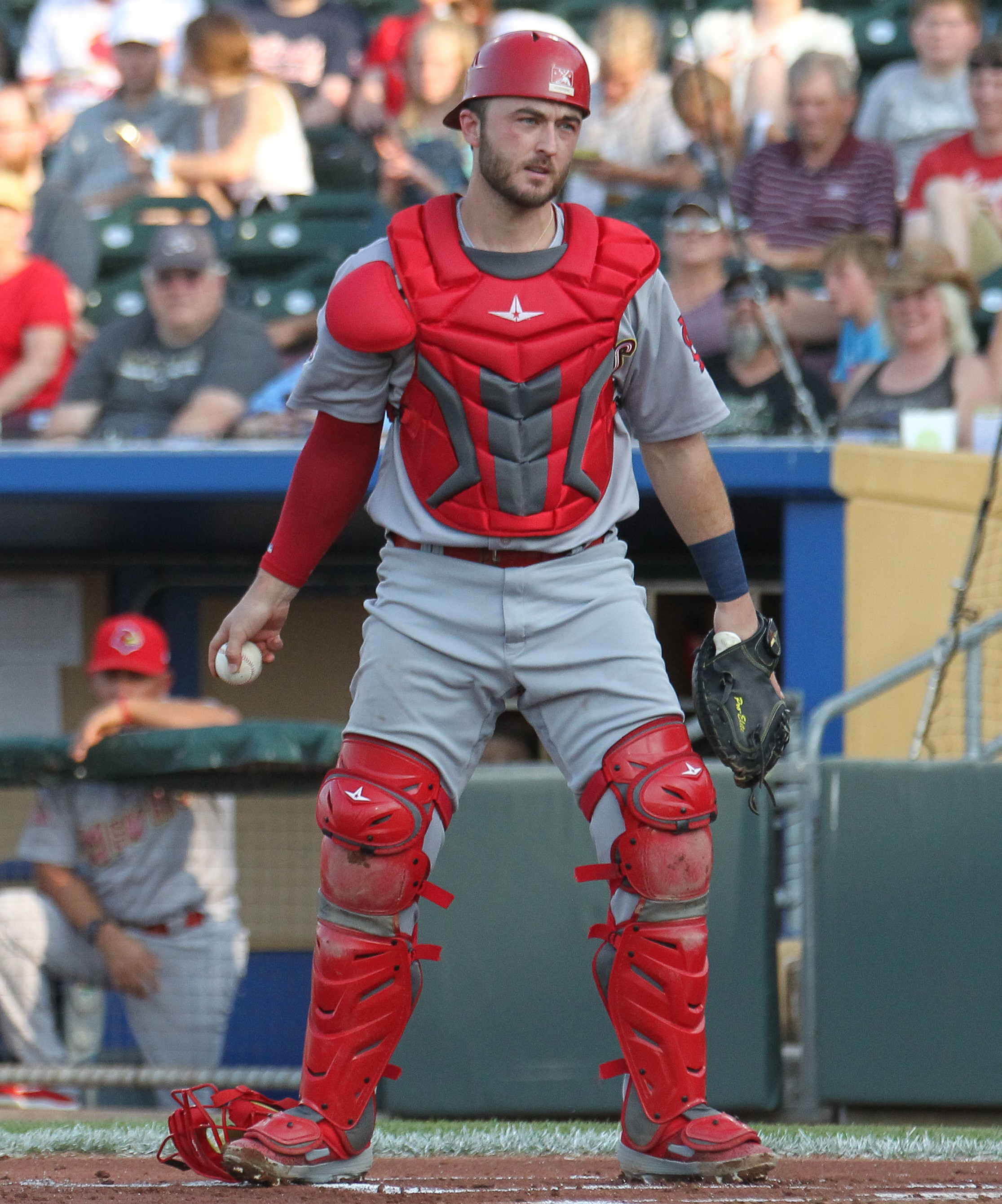
- Hudson with the Memphis Redbirds in 2019
- Catcher
- Born: May 21, 1991 (age 34); Tampa, Florida, U.S.
- Batted: Right Threw: Right

MLB debut
- September 8, 2018, for the Los Angeles Angels

Last MLB appearance
- June 21, 2024, for the New York Mets

MLB statistics
- Batting average: .167
- Home runs: 0
- Runs batted in: 1
- Stats at Baseball Reference

Teams
- Los Angeles Angels (2018); St. Louis Cardinals (2019); Seattle Mariners (2020); New York Mets (2024)

Joseph Thaddeus Hudson (born May 21, 1991) is an American former professional baseball catcher. He played in Major League Baseball (MLB) for the Los Angeles Angels, St. Louis Cardinals, Seattle Mariners, and New York Mets.

== Playing career ==
Hudson attended Jesuit High School in Tampa, Florida, and the University of Notre Dame, where he played college baseball for the Notre Dame Fighting Irish.

=== Cincinnati Reds ===
The Cincinnati Reds selected Hudson in the sixth round of the 2012 Major League Baseball draft. He was assigned to the Billings Mustangs for 2012. In 2013, he played for the Dayton Dragons, and played for the team in 2014 as well. Hudson was invited to Spring Training for the 2016 season, but did not make the club and was assigned to the Pensacola Blue Wahoos. Hudson was invited to Spring Training for the 2018 season, but once again did not make the club and was reassigned to the Louisville Bats.

=== Los Angeles Angels ===
On June 30, 2018, the Reds traded Hudson to the Los Angeles Angels in exchange for cash considerations. The Angels promoted him to the major leagues on September 4. Hudson was designated for assignment on October 26, and became a free agent on November 2.

=== St. Louis Cardinals ===
On November 13, 2018, Hudson signed a minor league contract with the St. Louis Cardinals. On September 1, 2019, the Cardinals selected Hudson's contract, adding him to their active roster. He made only one appearance for St. Louis, striking out in his only plate appearance. On November 1, Hudson was removed from the 40-man roster and sent outright to the Triple-A Memphis Redbirds. He elected free agency on November 4.

=== Seattle Mariners ===
On January 22, 2020, Hudson signed a minor league contract with the Seattle Mariners. On July 23, Seattle selected Hudson's contract after he made the team's Opening Day roster. He made nine appearances for the Mariners, going 3-for-17 (.176) with two walks and five strikeouts spanning 20 plate appearances. On October 19, Hudson was removed from the 40-man roster and sent outright to the Triple-A Tacoma Rainiers. The same day, it was announced that he had elected free agency.

=== Pittsburgh Pirates ===
On January 25, 2021, Hudson signed a minor league contract with the Pittsburgh Pirates organization and was invited to Spring Training. Hudson spent the season with the Triple-A Indianapolis Indians. He played in 47 games for Indianapolis, hitting .188 with three home runs and 18 RBI. On October 1, Hudson was released by the Pirates.

=== Tampa Bay Rays ===
On March 11, 2022, Hudson signed a minor league contract with the Tampa Bay Rays. In 49 games for the Triple-A Durham Bulls, he slashed .226/.346/.489 with 11 home runs and 27 RBI. Hudson elected free agency following the season on November 10.

=== Atlanta Braves ===
On December 5, 2022, Hudson signed a minor league contract with the Atlanta Braves. He participated in major league spring training activities before the 2023 regular season began, before later being assigned to minor league camp. In 69 games for the Triple–A Gwinnett Stripers, Hudson batted .232/.371/.396 with 9 home runs, 37 RBI, and 4 stolen bases. He elected free agency following the season on November 6, 2023.

=== Chicago Cubs ===
On December 14, 2023, Hudson signed a minor league contract with the Chicago Cubs. Hudson appeared in only two games for the Triple–A Iowa Cubs, going 0–for–6 with one walk.

=== New York Mets ===
On April 11, 2024, Hudson was traded to the New York Mets organization. In 19 games for the Triple–A Syracuse Mets, he hit .222/.364/.444 with three home runs, nine RBI, and three stolen bases. On June 5, the Mets added Hudson to their 40-man roster. He appeared in one game as a defensive replacement before he was designated for assignment on June 24. Hudson cleared waivers and was sent outright to Syracuse on June 26. He elected free agency on October 21.

=== Houston Astros ===
On December 9, 2024, Hudson signed a minor league contract with the Houston Astros. He made 21 appearances for the Triple-A Sugar Land Space Cowboys in 2025, batting .114/.215/.257 with three home runs and 10 RBI. Hudson elected free agency following the season on November 6, 2025.

On November 14, 2025, Hudson announced his retirement from playing via an Instagram post.

== Coaching career ==
On February 8, 2026, the Tampa Bay Rays hired Hudson in a player development role.
