= José Álvarez (baseball, born 1989) =

Venezuelan baseball player (born 1989)

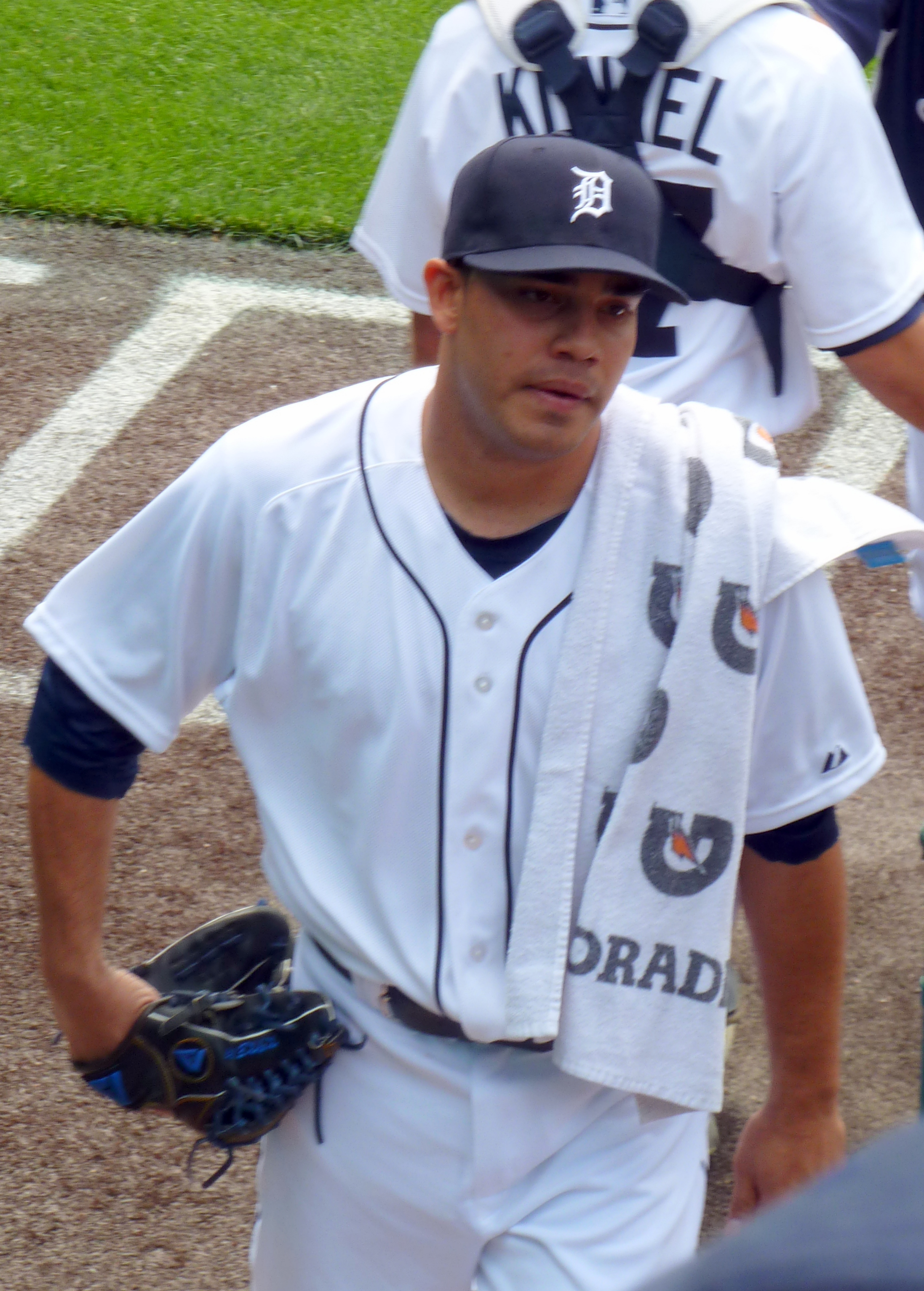
- Álvarez with the Detroit Tigers

Free agent
- Pitcher
- Born: May 6, 1989 (age 37); Barcelona, Anzoátegui, Venezuela
- Bats: Left Throws: Left

MLB debut
- June 9, 2013, for the Detroit Tigers

MLB statistics (through 2022 season)
- Win–loss record: 22–25
- Earned run average: 3.47
- Strikeouts: 360
- Stats at Baseball Reference

Teams
- Detroit Tigers (2013); Los Angeles Angels of Anaheim / Los Angeles Angels (2014–2018); Philadelphia Phillies (2019–2020); San Francisco Giants (2021–2022)
Medals
Men's baseball
Representing Venezuela
World Baseball Classic
Gold medal – first place	2026 Miami	Team

José Ricardo Álvarez (born May 6, 1989) is a Venezuelan professional baseball pitcher who is a free agent. He has previously played in Major League Baseball (MLB) for the Detroit Tigers, Los Angeles Angels, Philadelphia Phillies, and San Francisco Giants.

He was signed as an international free agent by the Boston Red Sox in 2005. In the minor leagues, Álvarez was a 2009 New York–Penn League mid-season All Star, and a 2011 Florida State League mid-season All Star. In the winter of 2014–15, he was named Venezuelan Professional Baseball League Pitcher of the Year. He made his major league debut in 2013. In 2018 he was second in the American League in appearances, with 76.

== Career ==
Álvarez was born in Barcelona, Anzoátegui, Venezuela.

=== Boston Red Sox (2005–09) ===
He was signed as an international free agent by the Boston Red Sox in July 2005. In 2006 with the DSL Red Sox of the Dominican Summer League, Álvarez was 2–1 with a 1.61 ERA and 64 strikeouts in 61 2/3 innings. In 2007 with the GCL Red Sox of the Gulf Coast League he was 4–1 with a 1.84 ERA (third in the league) and 38 strikeouts in 49 innings. In 2008 with the Greenville Drive of the Single–A South Atlantic League he was 8–9 with a 5.70 ERA, and 86 strikeouts in 118 innings.

In 2009, pitching for the Lowell Spinners in the Low–A New York-Pennsylvania League, Álvarez was a mid-season All Star, and ended the season 8–3 for the Spinners with a 1.52 ERA (3rd in the league, and tops in the Boston farm system), and 63 strikeouts in 83 innings. He also pitched for the Salem Red Sox in the High–A Carolina League, and was 1–1 with a 4.74 ERA, and 11 strikeouts in 24 2/3 innings.

=== Florida Marlins (2010–12) ===
Álvarez advanced as high as Single–A before being traded in November 2009 with Hunter Jones to the Florida Marlins organization in exchange for Jeremy Hermida. In 2010 Álvarez was third in the Single–A South Atlantic League in wins as he went 10–3 with the Greensboro Grasshoppers with a 3.58 ERA and 113 strikeouts in 108 innings.

In 2011, pitching for the Jupiter Hammerheads in the High–A Florida State League, Álvarez was a mid-season All Star, and ended the season 6–5 for the Hammerheads with a 2.96 ERA, with 73 strikeouts in 82 innings. He was a two-time winner of the best changeup in the Florida Marlins farm system.

In 2012 he pitched for the Jacksonville Suns in the Double–A Southern League. Álvarez was league Pitcher of the Week for the week ended June 25, and for the season was 6–9 with a 4.22 ERA, with 3 complete games (tied for the league lead), 1.66 walks per nine innings (tops among league starters), and 70 strikeouts in 136 1/3 innings.

=== Detroit Tigers (2012–14) ===
At the end of the 2012 season Álvarez was released, and he was picked up by the Detroit Tigers on November 8, 2012, as a minor league free agent.

Álvarez was invited as a non-roster free agent by the Detroit Tigers to their 2013 spring training. He played for the Triple–A Toledo Mud Hens, where by June 2013 he was leading the International League in strikeouts, Walks plus hits per innings pitched (WHIP), and baserunners per nine innings.

Álvarez was called up to the majors for the first time on June 9, 2013, and made his debut starting in place of Aníbal Sánchez. He recorded a win and a quality start, pitching six innings while striking out seven against the Cleveland Indians. He was sent back to the Toledo Mud Hens that same day and was recalled June 20 to start again in place of Sánchez. On August 28, Alvarez was sent back to Toledo. In 2013 with the Tigers he was 1–5 with one save and a 5.82 ERA, with 31 strikeouts in 38 2/3 innings. With Toledo, he was 8–6 with a 2.80 ERA (4th in the league), 5th in the league with a .235 batting average against and 1.79 walks per nine innings, and 115 strikeouts (10th) in 128 2/3 innings. He was named Detroit Tigers 2013 Minor League Pitcher of the Year. Baseball America named him as having the best change up and control in the International League.

=== Los Angeles Angels of Anaheim / Los Angeles Angels (2014–18) ===
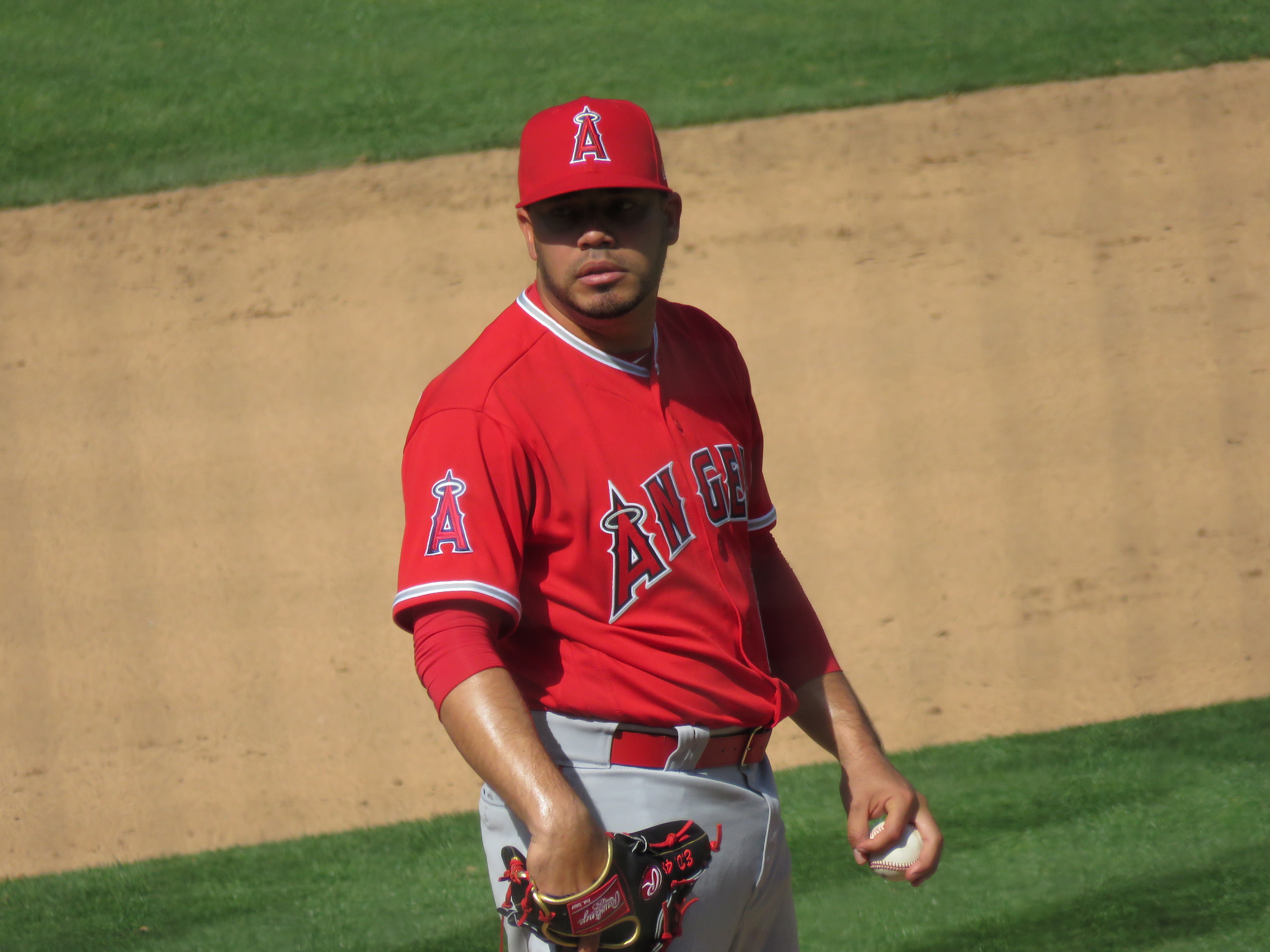
Álvarez in 2018

On March 21, 2014, the Tigers traded Álvarez to the Los Angeles Angels of Anaheim for shortstop Andrew Romine. He made two scoreless appearances for the Angels in 2014.

In the winter of 2014–15 he pitched for the Caribes de Anzoategui of the Venezuelan Winter League, and was named Venezuelan Winter League Pitcher of the Year after leading the league in wins. Álvarez was 6–1 with two saves and a 1.91 ERA, with 40 strikeouts in 56 2/3 innings.

Álvarez was called upon by the Angels 64 times in the 2015 season, posting a 4–3 record with a 3.49 ERA, and 59 strikeouts in 67 IP. He was tied for sixth in the American League with 19 relief appearances of more than one inning pitched.

In 2016, Álvarez made 64 appearances for the Angels. He registered a 1–3 record and an ERA of 3.45, with 51 strikeouts in 57 1/3 innings.

He pitched in four games for Team Venezuela in the 2017 World Baseball Classic.

Álvarez made 64 appearances for the third straight season in 2017 for the Angels, registering an 0–3 record with one save and an ERA of 3.88 and 45 strikeouts in 48 2/3 innings. Among left-handed relief pitchers, his 83% stranded rate was 6th in the major leagues (minimum 30 innings). Lefthanders batted .245/.252/.462 against him, with one walk and 26 strikeouts.

In 2018, Álvarez was 6–4 with one save and posted career bests in games (76; 2nd-most in the American League), wins (6), and ERA (2.71; 4th among left-handed AL relievers), and tied his career high with 59 strikeouts. He allowed three home runs over 63 innings, and limited left-handed batters to batting .206/.265/.338 against him with nine walks and 34 strikeouts. He was 5th among all MLB relievers, stranding 86.0% of inherited runners.

=== Philadelphia Phillies (2019–20) ===
On December 6, 2018, Álvarez was traded to the Philadelphia Phillies, for relief pitcher Luis Garcia. Alvarez made his first start in five years on June 1, 2019, as the Phillies' opener against the Los Angeles Dodgers. In 2019 with the Phillies he was 3–4 with one save and a 3.36 ERA, as he pitched in 67 games (one start) over 59 innings.

In 2020, during an August 20 game against the Toronto Blue Jays, Alvarez was struck in the groin by a line drive hit, leading to an injury that caused him to be inactive for the remainder of the season. In 2020 he was 0–0 with a 1.42 ERA in 6 1/3 innings in which he struck out 6 batters over eight games.

=== San Francisco Giants (2021–2022) ===
On March 6, 2021, Álvarez signed a one-year, $1.15 million contract with the San Francisco Giants, that included a $1.5 million club option for 2022.

In the 2021 regular season, Álvarez was 5–2 with a career-best 2.37 ERA in 67 games (1 start), in which he pitched 64 2/3 innings and allowed 7.4 hits per 9 innings pitched.

In 2022, Álvarez made 21 appearances for San Francisco, posting a 2–1 record and 5.28 ERA with 15 strikeouts in 15.1 innings pitched. He was placed on the injured list in early July with left elbow inflammation. On September 2, 2022, Álvarez underwent Tommy John surgery, ending his 2022 and 2023 seasons.

=== Detroit Tigers (second stint) (2023) ===
On March 22, 2023, Álvarez signed a minor league contract with the Detroit Tigers organization. He was optioned to Triple-A Toledo to begin the year, but spent the entire season on the injured list as he recovered from surgery. Álvarez was released by the Tigers organization on January 31, 2024.

=== Toros de Tijuana (2024–2025) ===
On June 9, 2024, Álvarez signed with the Toros de Tijuana of the Mexican League. In 18 games for Tijuana, he posted an 0–1 record and 1.17 ERA with 12 strikeouts across 15 1/3 innings pitched.

Álvarez made 53 appearances for Tijuana in 2025, compiling a 2-1 record and 1.88 ERA with 37 strikeouts across 43 innings of relief. He became a free agent following the season.

=== Leones de Yucatán ===
On April 25, 2026, Álvarez signed with the Leones de Yucatán of the Mexican League. In 30 relief appearances for the Leones, he posted a 1–2 record with a 3.38 ERA, 12 strikeouts, and three walks across 26 2/3 innings pitched. On June 26, Álvarez was released by Yucatán.

== See also ==
- List of Major League Baseball players from Venezuela
