= Justin Anderson (baseball) =

American baseball player (born 1992)

- Pitcher
- Born: September 28, 1992 (age 34); Houston, Texas, U.S.
- Batted: Left Threw: Right

MLB debut
- April 23, 2018, for the Los Angeles Angels

Last MLB appearance
- September 25, 2024, for the Chicago White Sox

MLB statistics
- Win–loss record: 7–5
- Earned run average: 4.63
- Strikeouts: 184
- Stats at Baseball Reference

Teams
- Los Angeles Angels (2018–2019); Chicago White Sox (2024)

Justin Charles Anderson (born September 28, 1992) is an American former professional baseball pitcher. He played in Major League Baseball (MLB) for the Los Angeles Angels and Chicago White Sox.

== Amateur career ==
Anderson attended St. Pius X High School in Houston, Texas, and the University of Texas at San Antonio (UTSA). He played college baseball for the UTSA Roadrunners from 2012 through 2014. The Angels selected him in the 14th round of the 2014 MLB draft.

== Professional career ==
=== Los Angeles Angels ===
After signing with the Angels, Anderson was assigned to the Orem Owlz of the Rookie-level Pioneer League before being reassigned to the Arizona Angels of the Rookie-level Arizona League. In 29 innings pitched between the two teams, he had a 1–4 win–loss record with a 4.07 earned run average (ERA). In 2015, he played for the Burlington Bees of the Single–A Midwest League, and he compiled a 9–9 record, 3.41 ERA, and a 1.39 walks plus hits per inning pitched (WHIP) in 28 games (22 starts).

He pitched for the Inland Empire 66ers of the High–A California League in 2016, where he went 8–12 (2nd in the league in losses) with a 5.70 ERA in 28 games (27 starts), over 145 1/3 innings (4th in the league). Anderson moved to the bullpen in 2017 and played Inland Empire and the Mobile BayBears of the Double–A Southern League, posting a 3–2 record and 5.06 ERA in 46 relief appearances.

In 2018, Anderson began the season with Mobile, and after 3 2/3 scoreless innings, was promoted to the Salt Lake Bees of the Triple–A Pacific Coast League. The Angels promoted him to the major leagues on April 23, 2018. He made his major league debut that night. Anderson would appear in 57 games, going 3-3 and recording 4 saves with a 4.07 ERA, and striking out 67 in 55 1/3 innings (averaging 10.9 strikeouts per 9 innings) while walking 40 batters. The following season, Anderson's inconsistency proved to be his downfall as he registered an ERA of 5.55 in 54 games. He had a K/BB ratio of 60/32 in 47 innings.

In July 2020, Anderson underwent Tommy John surgery, and would miss the entirety of the season. On December 2, 2020, Anderson was non-tendered by the Angels and became a free agent

=== Texas Rangers ===
On January 13, 2021, Anderson signed a two-year, minor league contract with the Texas Rangers organization. He returned to action with the rookie–level Arizona Complex League Rangers, and was elevated to the Triple–A Round Rock Express after two appearances. In 11 appearances with Round Rock, Anderson posted a 3.27 ERA with 19 strikeouts in 11.0 innings of work.

He was invited to spring training in 2022 with Texas, but did not make the team and returned to Triple–A Round Rock to begin the season. In 3 appearances for Round Rock, Anderson logged a 6.00 ERA with 4 strikeouts in 3.0 innings pitched. He elected free agency following the season on November 10, 2022.

=== Kansas City Royals ===
On June 7, 2023, Anderson signed a minor league contract with the Kansas City Royals organization. He made 24 appearances split between the rookie-level Arizona Complex League Royals, Double-A Northwest Arkansas Naturals, and Triple-A Omaha Storm Chasers, accumulating a 6.87 ERA with 59 strikeouts across 36 2/3 innings of work. Anderson elected free agency following the season on November 6.

=== Chicago White Sox ===
On November 21, 2023, Anderson signed a minor league contract with the Chicago White Sox. He was assigned to the Triple-A Charlotte Knights to begin the 2024 season and made five scoreless appearances in the minors. On April 12, the White Sox selected Anderson's contract to the major league roster. In 56 relief appearances, he had a 1–2 record and 4.39 ERA with 57 strikeouts across 53 1/3 innings pitched.

Anderson was optioned to Triple-A Charlotte to begin the 2025 season. In 4 games for the Knights, he struggled to a 7.94 ERA with 8 strikeouts across 5 2/3 innings pitched. Anderson was designated for assignment by Chicago on April 11. He cleared waivers and was sent outright to Charlotte on April 16. Anderson was released by the White Sox organization on July 23.
