= Noé Ramirez =

American baseball player (born 1989)

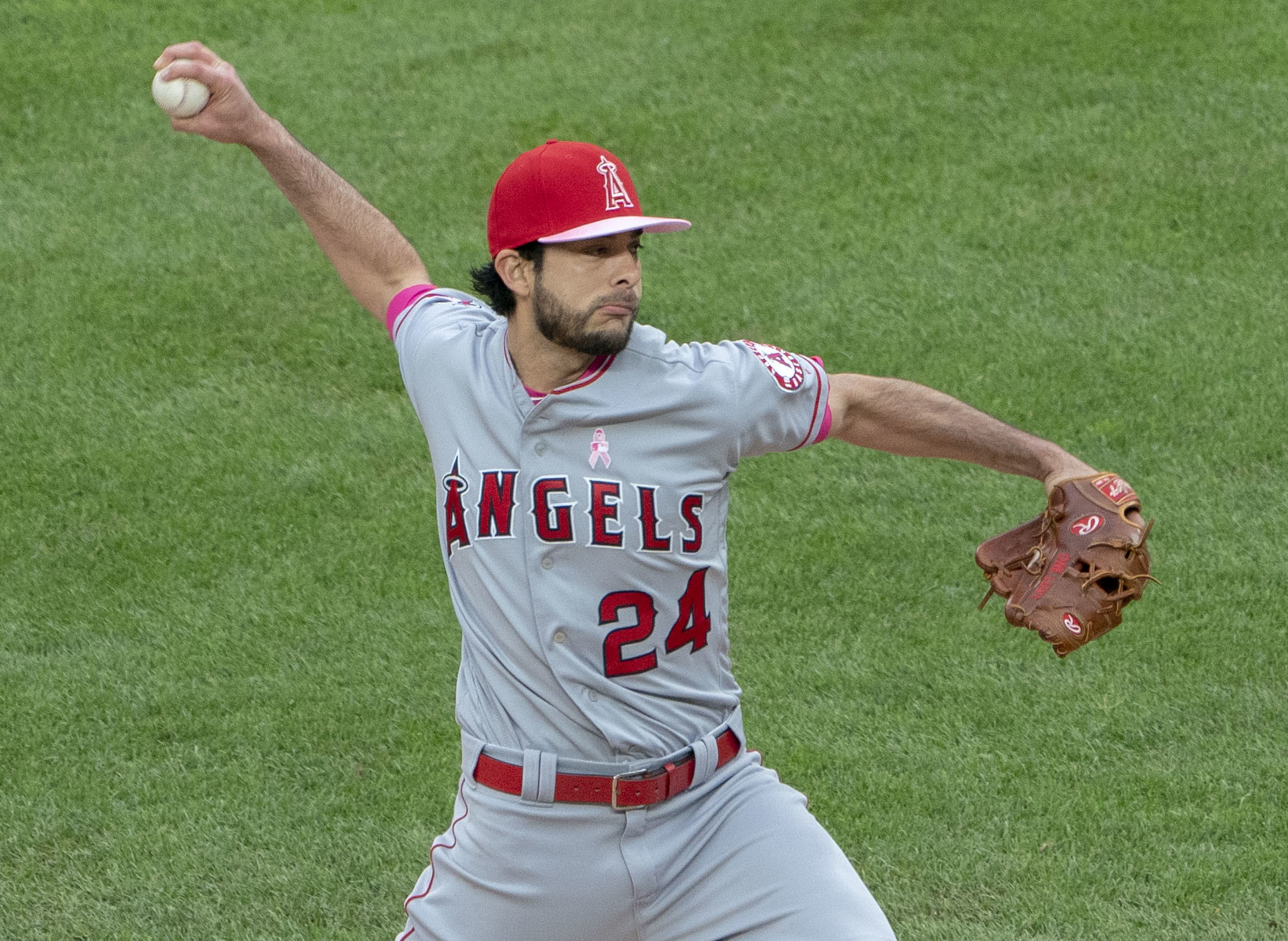
- Ramirez with the Los Angeles Angels in 2019
- Pitcher
- Born: December 22, 1989 (age 36); Los Angeles, California, U.S.
- Batted: Right Threw: Right

MLB debut
- July 3, 2015, for the Boston Red Sox

Last MLB appearance
- August 30, 2022, for the Arizona Diamondbacks

MLB statistics
- Win–loss record: 18–16
- Earned run average: 4.21
- Strikeouts: 310
- Stats at Baseball Reference

Teams
- Boston Red Sox (2015–2017); Los Angeles Angels (2017–2021); Arizona Diamondbacks (2021–2022)

Noé Ramirez (born December 22, 1989) is an American former professional baseball pitcher. He played in Major League Baseball (MLB) for the Boston Red Sox, Los Angeles Angels, and Arizona Diamondbacks. The Red Sox selected Ramirez in the fourth round of the 2011 MLB draft and he made his MLB debut in 2015.

== Amateur career ==
After graduating from Alhambra High School, Ramirez enrolled at California State University, Fullerton. In 2010, he pitched for the USA Baseball Collegiate National Team in 2010, earning the silver medal at the FISU World University Baseball Championships held in Tokyo, Japan. In 2011, his junior year, he posted an 8–4 record with a 1.69 earned run average and 103 strikeouts while holding opponents to a .179 batting average in 13 starts and one relief appearance that year. He earned second team All-American honors from Collegiate Baseball and was named to the All-Big West Conference first team in the same season. After the season, the Boston Red Sox selected Ramirez in the fourth round (142nd overall) of the 2011 Major League Baseball draft.

== Professional career ==
=== Boston Red Sox ===
Ramirez signed and debuted as a starter in 2012 and had a record of 2–7 with a 4.15 ERA for the Class A Greenville Drive, but the Boston organization turned him into a reliever the next year and he was promoted to the Class High-A Salem Red Sox. Ramirez went 2–1 with a 2.11 ERA and three saves at Salem and finished the season with the Double A Portland Sea Dogs, where he registered a mark of 1–1 with a 2.83 ERA and six saves. Overall, Ramirez did strike out 75 batters and gave 17 walks over 75 2/3 innings pitched. Besides, he was selected to the Rising Stars game of the Arizona Fall League during the postseason.

His breakthrough season came in 2014, when he finished 2–1 with a 2.14 ERA and saved 18 games in 21 opportunities for Portland, being named to the Eastern League All-Star game. He also led the league's relievers in innings pitched (67 1/3), finished third in saves, and not allowed a home run in 42 games.

From 2012 through 2014, Ramirez posted a 7–10 record with a 2.93 ERA and 24 saves in 95 games, including a 1.15 WHIP and a 4.00 K/BB ratio (216-to-54) in 230.0 innings of work.

Ramirez joined the Triple A Pawtucket Red Sox in 2015. On June 17, Ramirez surrendered a home run in a game against the Charlotte Knights. It was the first home run he had allowed since August 6, 2013, a span of 59 appearances and broke a string of 96 2/3 innings without allowing a homer.

Ramirez earned a promotion to the Boston Red Sox on July 3, 2015, and made his major league debut on the same day, throwing one inning of relief against the Houston Astros at Fenway Park. He allowed four runs – three earned – on three hits and a hit batsman, striking out one and was credited with the loss. Ramirez was reassigned to Triple-A the next day.

=== Los Angeles Angels ===
On August 18, 2017, Ramirez was claimed off waivers by the Los Angeles Angels. He ended the season appearing in 12 games, averaging 10.8 strikeouts per 9 innings.

The following season, Ramirez was a permanent member of the Angels bullpen, appearing in 69 games, with a 4.54 ERA. In 2018 he finished 7–5 with one save in 83 1/3 innings, striking out 95, averaging 10.3 strikeouts per 9 innings.

On July 17, 2019, Ramirez was suspended 3 games for hitting Jake Marisnick with a pitch. He served as an opener for the Angels, starting 7 games on the season. Overall, Ramirez finished with an ERA of 3.99 in 51 total games.

In 2020, Ramirez pitched to a 3.00 ERA with 14 strikeouts over 21 innings pitched.

=== Cincinnati Reds ===
On December 7, 2020, Ramirez and a player to be named later were traded to the Cincinnati Reds in exchange for Raisel Iglesias. Three days later, Leo Rivas was sent to Cincinnati as the PTBNL. On March 27, 2021, the Reds released Ramirez.

=== Los Angeles Angels (second stint) ===
On March 28, 2021, Ramirez agreed to a minor league contract to return to the Los Angeles Angels organization. On May 11, 2021, Ramirez was selected to the active roster. Ramirez recorded a 5.40 ERA in 2 appearances before being designated for assignment on May 16. On May 18, Ramirez cleared waivers and elected free agency.

=== Arizona Diamondbacks ===
On May 22, 2021, Ramirez signed a minor league contract with the Arizona Diamondbacks organization. On June 18, he was selected to the active roster. Ramirez made 36 appearances for the Diamondbacks in 2021, recording a 2.76 ERA with 29 strikeouts across 32 2/3 innings pitched.

Ramirez made 55 appearances for Arizona in 2022, working to a 5–4 record and 5.22 ERA with 51 strikeouts over 50 innings of work. On September 1, 2022, Ramirez was designated for assignment following the promotion of Wilmer Difo. He was released by the organization on September 3.

== Pitching profile ==
Ramirez throws his three-pitch repertoire with good command and control of each offering. He features a deceptive delivery from a low three-quarters arm slot and hides the ball well until the point of release, making him especially tough for right-handed hitters to pick up his 89-92 mph fastball, and is considerably effective at getting left-handed hitters out with his solid 82-84 mph changeup, which he can throw in any count and uses it to keep all batters off-balance.

== Personal life ==
Ramirez is of Mexican American descent.
