= Francisco Arcia =

Venezuelan baseball player (born 1989)

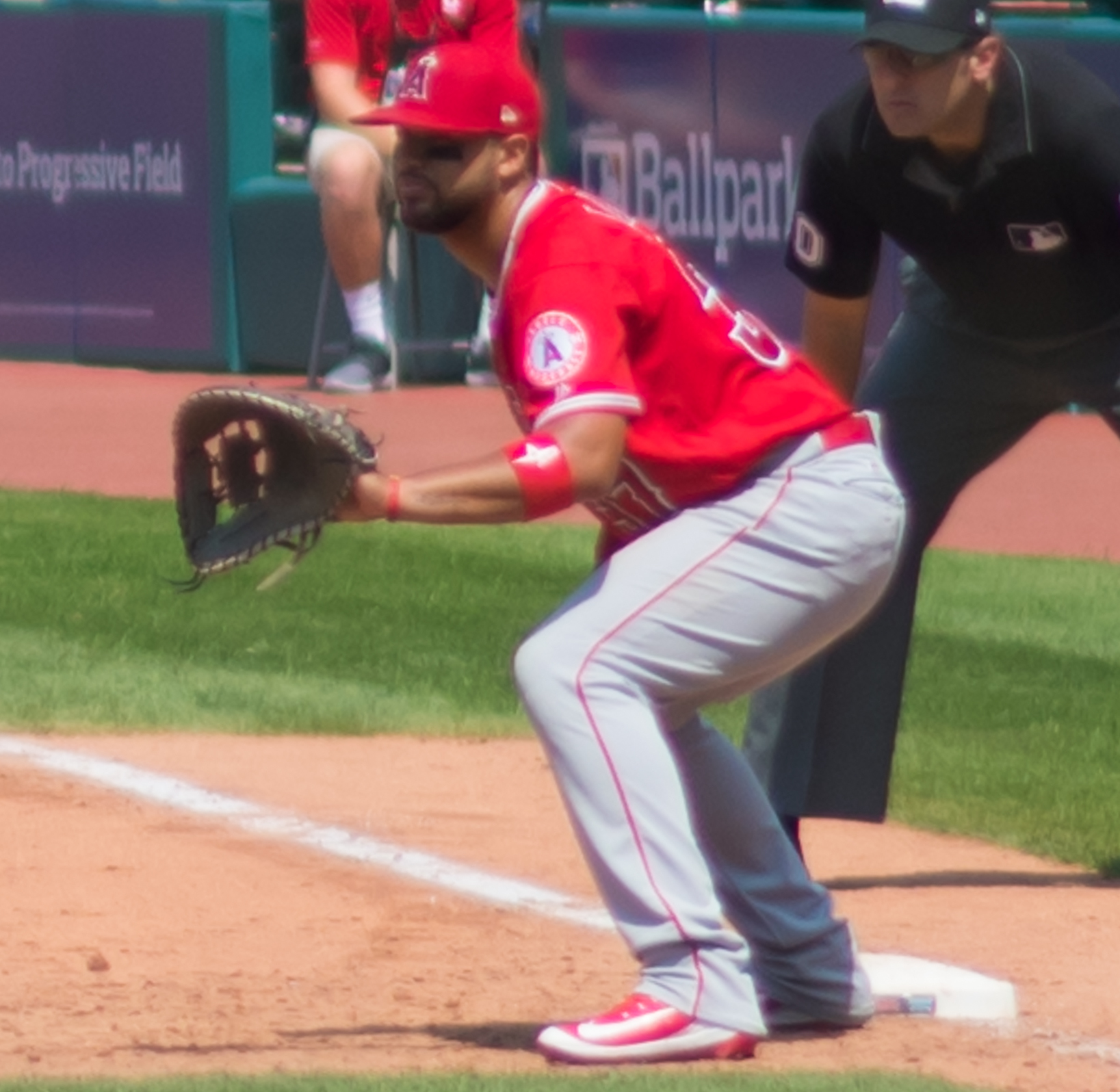
- Arcia with the Los Angeles Angels in 2018

Algodoneros de Unión Laguna – No. 39
- Catcher
- Born: September 14, 1989 (age 37); Maiquetia, Venezuela
- Bats: Switch Throws: Right

MLB debut
- July 26, 2018, for the Los Angeles Angels

MLB statistics (through 2018 season)
- Batting average: .204
- Home runs: 6
- Runs batted in: 23
- Stats at Baseball Reference

Teams
- Los Angeles Angels (2018)

Francisco Antonio Arcia (born September 14, 1989) is a Venezuelan professional baseball catcher for the Algodoneros de Unión Laguna of the Mexican League. He has previously played in Major League Baseball (MLB) for the Los Angeles Angels.

== Career ==
=== New York Yankees ===
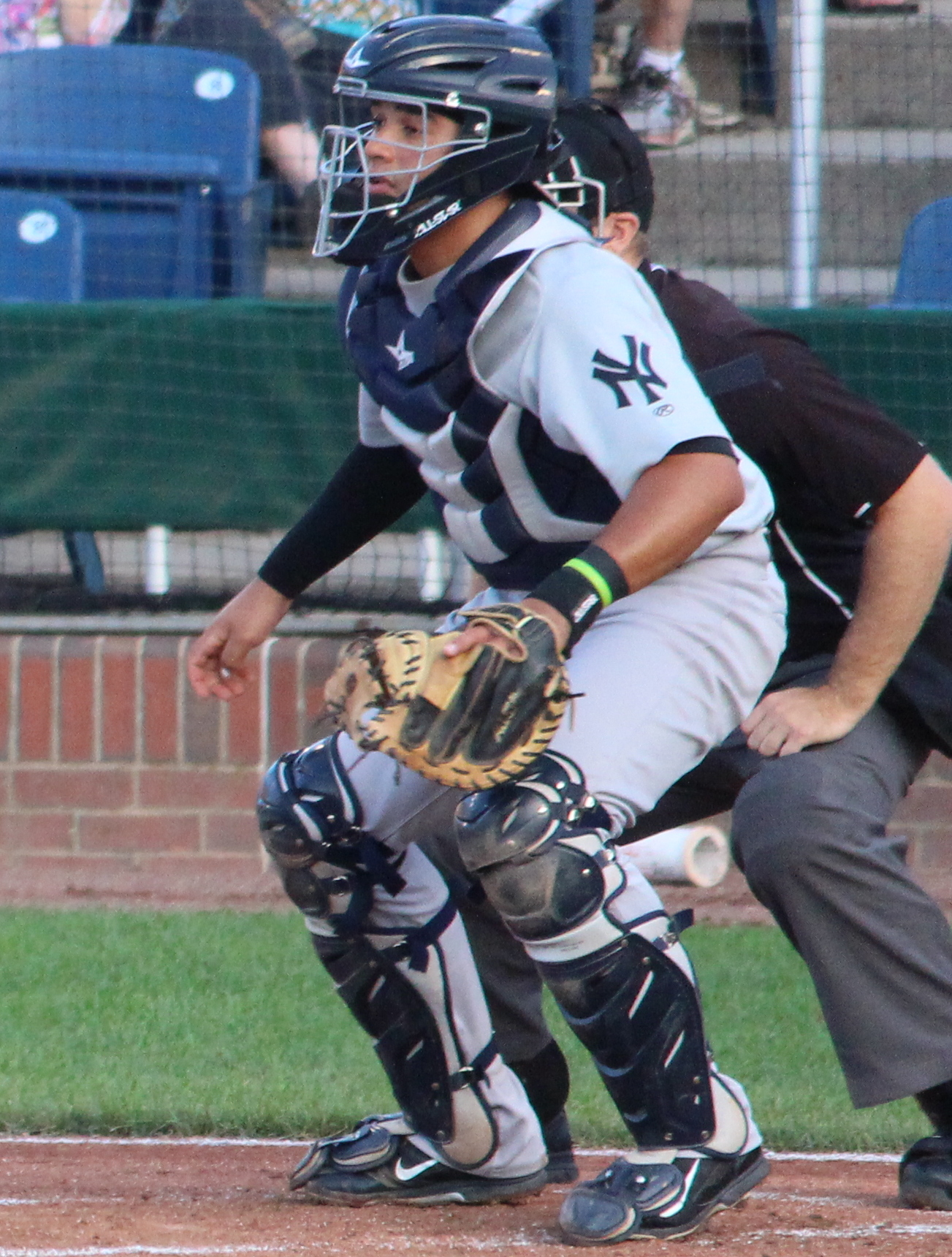
Arcia with the Trenton Thunder in 2015

On May 8, 2007, the New York Yankees signed Arcia as an international free agent to a minor league contract. He made his professional debut for the Dominican Summer League Yankees. Arcia spent the 2008 and 2009 seasons with the rookie-level Gulf Coast League Yankees, hitting .128 and .247 respectively. He split the 2010 season between the Single-A Charleston RiverDogs and the Low-A Staten Island Yankees, accumulating a .255/.313/.349 batting line between the clubs. Arcia remained in Charleston for the 2011 season, but only appeared in three games. In 2012, Arcia again remained in Charleston, batting .246/.319/.384 in 68 games.

Arcia split the 2013 season between the High-A Tampa Yankees and the Double-A Trenton Thunder, slashing .213/.286/.305 between the two teams. He spent 2014 with Trenton and the Triple-A Scranton/Wilkes-Barre RailRiders, batting .276/.311/.347 in 64 games. Arcia was invited to spring training for the 2015 season but did not make the club and was assigned to Trenton, where he batted .248/.325/.319 before electing free agency on November 6, 2015.

=== Miami Marlins ===
On November 18, 2015, he signed a minor league contract with the Miami Marlins organization. He split the season between the Triple–A New Orleans Zephyrs and the Double–A Jacksonville Suns, slashing .228/.307/.283 before he elected free agency on November 7, 2016.

=== Los Angeles Angels ===
On November 17, 2016, Arcia signed a minor league contract with the Los Angeles Angels organization. He split the 2017 season between the Triple-A Salt Lake Bees and the Double-A Mobile BayBears, hitting .220/.318/.250 in 43 games. He elected free agency following the season on November 6, 2017. Arcia re–signed with the Angels on a minor league deal on January 17, 2018, and was assigned to Salt Lake to begin the 2018 season.

The Angels promoted Arcia to the major leagues on July 26, 2018, after spending 12 years in the minor leagues, and he made his major league debut that same day. Arcia's first major league hit, a three-run home run in the seventh, came on the same day. After his second major league game on July 28, 2018, Arcia became the first player in history to record 10 RBI's in his first two games. On August 11, Arcia became the first Angels position player to pitch in a game since Chili Davis did so in 1993. On September 20, Arcia became the first player in major league history to catch, pitch, and hit a home run in the same game. He finished his rookie year with a .204/.226/.427 slash line with 6 home runs and 23 RBI in 41 games.

On November 2, 2018, Arcia was outrighted off of the 40-man roster and elected free agency.

=== Chicago Cubs ===
On December 19, 2018, Arcia signed a minor-league contract with the Chicago Cubs. He was assigned to the Triple-A Iowa Cubs, but was released on July 18, 2019, after mustering a .181 average in 51 games.

=== New York Yankees (second stint) ===
On July 23, 2019, Arcia signed a minor league contract with the New York Yankees and was assigned to the Double-A Trenton Thunder. Between Trenton and the Triple-A Scranton/Wilkes-Barre RailRiders, he batted .192 with two RBI and .289 with one home run and six RBI, respectively. Arcia elected free agency following the season on November 4.

=== Los Angeles Angels (second stint) ===
On February 6, 2020, Arcia signed a minor league deal with the Los Angeles Angels organization. He did not play in a game in 2020 due to the cancellation of the minor league season because of the COVID-19 pandemic. On September 6, Arcia was added to the Angels' 60-man player pool but did not get called up and elected free agency on November 2.

On March 5, 2021, Arcia signed with the West Virginia Power of the Atlantic League of Professional Baseball. However, on May 5, before the ALPB season began, Arcia signed a minor league contract with the Los Angeles Angels. He played in 10 games with the Triple-A Salt Lake Bees, going 10-for-28 (.357) with two RBI before being released on July 10.

=== Sultanes de Monterrey ===
On July 14, 2021, Arcia signed with the Sultanes de Monterrey of the Mexican League. In 16 appearances for the Sultanes, he slashed .235/.350/.294 with six RBI. Arcia was released by Monterrey on August 21.

=== West Virginia Power ===
On August 22, 2021, Arcia signed with the West Virginia Power of the Atlantic League of Professional Baseball. He made 27 appearances for West Virginia, slashing .281/.363/.382 with two home runs and 10 RBI. Arcia became a free agent following the season.

=== Tecolotes de los Dos Laredos ===
On April 6, 2022, Arcia signed with the Tecolotes de los Dos Laredos of the Mexican League. He played in 64 games for Dos Laredos, hitting .298/.398/.351 with no home runs and 22 RBI.

On August 26, 2022, Arcia signed with the Wild Health Genomes of the Atlantic League of Professional Baseball. He did not make an appearance for the Genomes and was released on September 8. His rights were later returned to Dos Laredos, but he was released from his contract prior to the 2023 season on March 6, 2023.

=== Washington Nationals ===
On March 7, 2023, Arcia signed a minor league contract with the Washington Nationals organization. He played in 11 games for the Triple-A Rochester Red Wings, batting .210/.286/.313 with no home runs and three RBI. On May 21, Arcia was released by the Nationals organization.

=== Tecolotes de los Dos Laredos (second stint) ===
On June 3, 2023, Arcia signed with the Tecolotes de los Dos Laredos of the Mexican League. In 39 games for the team, he slashed .254/.323/.305 with no home runs and seven RBI.

Arcia made 77 appearances for Dos Laredos in 2024, batting .261/.327/.343 with two home runs, 28 RBI, and one stolen base. He played in 70 contests for the team during the 2025 campaign, and hit .265/.362/.336 with three home runs and 29 RBI.

Arcia played in 35 games for the Tecolotes in 2026, his fourth season with the club, in which he batted .267/.362/.406 with three home runs and 10 RBI.

=== Algodoneros de Unión Laguna ===
On June 15, 2026, Arcia was traded to the Algodoneros de Unión Laguna of the Mexican League in exchange for catcher Alejandro Flores.
