= 2018 Major League Baseball season =

2018 MLB season
- League: Major League Baseball
- Sport: Baseball
- Duration: March 29 – October 28, 2018
- Games: 162
- Teams: 30
- TV partner(s): Fox/FS1; TBS; ESPN; MLB Network

Draft
- Top draft pick: Casey Mize
- Picked by: Detroit Tigers

Regular season
- Season MVP: AL: Mookie Betts (BOS); NL: Christian Yelich (MIL)

Postseason
- AL champions: Boston Red Sox
- AL runners-up: Houston Astros
- NL champions: Los Angeles Dodgers
- NL runners-up: Milwaukee Brewers

World Series
- Champions: Boston Red Sox
- Runners-up: Los Angeles Dodgers
- World Series MVP: Steve Pearce (BOS)

MLB seasons
- ← 2017 2019 →

Locations of AL teams for the 2013–2019 MLB seasons
West Central East
Locations of NL teams for the 2017–present MLB seasons
West Central East

Wilmer Difo in 2018

The 2018 Major League Baseball season began on March 29. The regular season ended on October 1, extended a day for tiebreaker games to decide the winners of the National League Central and National League West. The postseason began on October 2. The World Series began on October 23, and ended on October 28 with the Boston Red Sox defeating the Los Angeles Dodgers in five games to win their ninth World Series championship.

The 89th Major League Baseball All-Star Game was held on July 17 at Nationals Park, the home of the Washington Nationals. The American League won, 8–6, in 10 innings.

This was also the last season for August trade waivers.

== Schedule ==
As has been the case since 2013, all teams played their four division opponents 19 times each for a total of 76 games. They played six or seven games against each of the other ten same-league opponents for a total of 66 games, and 20 interleague games. The primary interleague match-ups were AL East vs NL East, AL Central vs NL Central, and AL West vs NL West. Since "natural rivalry" matchups were part of the three-year divisional rotation, the schedule format for interleague games was different from previous years. The 20 interleague games each team played two three-game series (one home, one away) against its natural rival (total of six games), two two-game series (one home, one away) against each team for two other opponents (total of eight games), and a single three-game series against each team for the last two (one home, one away; total of six games).

Under the new collective bargaining agreement reached in December 2016, the regular season was extended to 187 days in order to add four additional off-days for all teams. All teams were scheduled to play Opening Day, March 29—the earliest domestic start of a regular season in league history until the 2019 season. The Sunday night game before the All-Star Game was replaced by a single, nationally televised game on the Thursday after the All-Star Game (which for 2018, was played between the St. Louis Cardinals and Chicago Cubs), before all other teams returned from break the next day.

The Minnesota Twins and the Cleveland Indians played a two-game series at Hiram Bithorn Stadium in San Juan, Puerto Rico, on April 17 and 18, while the Los Angeles Dodgers and San Diego Padres played a three-game series at Estadio de Béisbol Monterrey in Monterrey, Mexico, from May 4 to 6. The 2018 MLB Little League Classic at BB&T Ballpark in Williamsport, Pennsylvania, coinciding with the Little League World Series, returned to the schedule. It was played between the Philadelphia Phillies and the New York Mets on August 19.

== Rule changes ==
Beginning in the 2018 season, MLB implemented new pace of play rules, which include limiting the number of mound visits for each team to six per nine innings. Teams will receive an additional visit for every extra inning played.

== Standings ==
=== American League ===
AL East
Team	W	L	Pct.	GB	Home	Road
^{(1)} Boston Red Sox	108	54	.667	—	57‍–‍24	51‍–‍30
^{(4)} New York Yankees	100	62	.617	8	53‍–‍28	47‍–‍34
Tampa Bay Rays	90	72	.556	18	51‍–‍30	39‍–‍42
Toronto Blue Jays	73	89	.451	35	40‍–‍41	33‍–‍48
Baltimore Orioles	47	115	.290	61	28‍–‍53	19‍–‍62

AL Central
Team	W	L	Pct.	GB	Home	Road
^{(3)} Cleveland Indians	91	71	.562	—	49‍–‍32	42‍–‍39
Minnesota Twins	78	84	.481	13	49‍–‍32	29‍–‍52
Detroit Tigers	64	98	.395	27	38‍–‍43	26‍–‍55
Chicago White Sox	62	100	.383	29	30‍–‍51	32‍–‍49
Kansas City Royals	58	104	.358	33	32‍–‍49	26‍–‍55

AL West
Team	W	L	Pct.	GB	Home	Road
^{(2)} Houston Astros	103	59	.636	—	46‍–‍35	57‍–‍24
^{(5)} Oakland Athletics	97	65	.599	6	50‍–‍31	47‍–‍34
Seattle Mariners	89	73	.549	14	45‍–‍36	44‍–‍37
Los Angeles Angels	80	82	.494	23	42‍–‍39	38‍–‍43
Texas Rangers	67	95	.414	36	34‍–‍47	33‍–‍48

=== National League ===
NL East
Team	W	L	Pct.	GB	Home	Road
^{(3)} Atlanta Braves	90	72	.556	—	43‍–‍38	47‍–‍34
Washington Nationals	82	80	.506	8	41‍–‍40	41‍–‍40
Philadelphia Phillies	80	82	.494	10	49‍–‍32	31‍–‍50
New York Mets	77	85	.475	13	37‍–‍44	40‍–‍41
Miami Marlins	63	98	.391	26½	38‍–‍43	25‍–‍55

NL Central
Team	W	L	Pct.	GB	Home	Road
^{(1)} Milwaukee Brewers	96	67	.589	—	51‍–‍30	45‍–‍37
^{(4)} Chicago Cubs	95	68	.583	1	51‍–‍31	44‍–‍37
St. Louis Cardinals	88	74	.543	7½	43‍–‍38	45‍–‍36
Pittsburgh Pirates	82	79	.509	13	44‍–‍36	38‍–‍43
Cincinnati Reds	67	95	.414	28½	37‍–‍44	30‍–‍51

NL West
Team	W	L	Pct.	GB	Home	Road
^{(2)} Los Angeles Dodgers	92	71	.564	—	45‍–‍37	47‍–‍34
^{(5)} Colorado Rockies	91	72	.558	1	47‍–‍34	44‍–‍38
Arizona Diamondbacks	82	80	.506	9½	40‍–‍41	42‍–‍39
San Francisco Giants	73	89	.451	18½	42‍–‍39	31‍–‍50
San Diego Padres	66	96	.407	25½	31‍–‍50	35‍–‍46

== Postseason ==
=== Bracket ===
Wild Card Games (ALWC, NLWC)
4	NY Yankees	1
5	Oakland	0
4	Chicago Cubs	0
5	Colorado	1

Division Series (ALDS, NLDS)
1	Boston	3
4	NY Yankees	1
American League
2	Houston	3
3	Cleveland	0
1	Milwaukee	3
5	Colorado	0
National League
2	LA Dodgers	3
3	Atlanta	1

League Championship Series (ALCS, NLCS)
1	Boston	4
2	Houston	1
1	Milwaukee	3
2	LA Dodgers	4

World Series
AL1	Boston	4
NL2	LA Dodgers	1

== Managerial changes ==
=== General managers ===
==== Offseason ====
Team	Former GM	Reason For Leaving	New GM	Story/Accomplishments
Atlanta Braves	John Coppolella	Resigned	Alex Anthopoulos	John Coppolella resigned from the Braves on October 2, 2017, because of a Major League Baseball investigation regarding signing bonuses of international prospects. On November 12, 2017, Alex Anthopoulos was hired as the new general manager of the team. On November 21, 2017, Coppolella was banned for life from baseball as a result of the investigation. The Braves were penalized with a loss of 13 prospects and a 2018 Rule 4 draft (third round) pick, and the league levied other penalties against the team for the next two international signing periods.

==== In-season ====
Date	Team	Former GM	New GM	Reason for leaving	Notes/Accomplishments
June 26	New York Mets	Sandy Alderson	Brodie Van Wagenen	Leave of Absence	On June 26, 2018, Alderson took a permanent leave of absence due to recurrence of cancer. He was hired as general manager in 2010 and saw the team win the National League Pennant in 2015. On October 28, 2018, after having three interims finish the rest of the season, the Mets agreed to have former agent Brodie Van Wagenen be their 13th general manager in franchise history.
September 24	San Francisco Giants	Bobby Evans	TBD	Fired	The Giants fired Bobby Evans after almost four seasons as general manager. The Giants made the playoffs in 2016, but are 166–224 (.426) since taking a major league-best 57–33 (.633) record into the All-Star break that year.

=== Field managers ===
==== Offseason ====
Team	Former manager	Reason for leaving	New manager	Story/Accomplishments
Detroit Tigers	Brad Ausmus	Contract not renewed	Ron Gardenhire	The Tigers announced on September 22, 2017, that Ausmus' contract would not be renewed. Ausmus compiled a 314–332 (.486) record in four years as manager with one playoff appearance. The Tigers hired former Minnesota Twins manager Ron Gardenhire on October 19, 2017. As the Twins' manager from 2002 to 2014 he compiled a record of 1068–1039 (.507), and 6–21 (.222) in six post-season appearances. He also won AL Manager of the Year in 2010.
Philadelphia Phillies	Pete Mackanin	Reassigned	Gabe Kapler	It was announced on October 1, 2017, that Mackanin would be removed as manager; however, he managed the final three games of the 2017 season. Mackanin had a record of 174–238 (.422) in his two and a half seasons as manager with no playoff appearances. It also was announced that he would remain with the organization as a special assistant to the general manager. On October 29, 2017, the Phillies announced the hire of former Dodgers' Director of Development Gabe Kapler. He had no previous major league managerial or coaching experience.
New York Mets	Terry Collins	Retired	Mickey Callaway	Collins announced on October 1, 2017, that he would retire after the last game of the season and move to the Mets' front office. Collins finished with a 551–583 (.486) record in seven years with club, with two playoff appearances in 2015 and 2016, in which they lost to the Kansas City Royals in the World Series and lost the Wild Card to the San Francisco Giants in the following season. The Mets named Cleveland Indians pitching coach Mickey Callaway as their new manager on October 22, 2017. Callaway had no previous managerial experience.
Boston Red Sox	John Farrell	Fired	Alex Cora	Farrell was fired on October 11, 2017. Farrell during his five years as manager compiled a 432–378 (.533) record and earned three division titles in 2013, 2016 and 2017. He led the Red Sox to the 2013 World Series title. Houston Astros bench coach Alex Cora was named manager on October 22, 2017, and formally assumed the role after the Astros' win in the 2017 World Series. He had no previous managerial experience.
Washington Nationals	Dusty Baker	Contract not renewed	Dave Martinez	The Nationals announced on October 20, 2017, that Baker would not be returning for the 2018 season. Baker led the Nationals to the postseason in each of his two seasons with the club but couldn't get past the NLDS. The Nationals were 192–132 (.593) under Baker. The Nationals hired Dave Martinez to be their new manager on October 29, 2017. Martinez was previously the bench coach for the Chicago Cubs and had no managerial experience.
New York Yankees	Joe Girardi	Contract not renewed	Aaron Boone	The Yankees announced on October 26, 2017, that Girardi would not return for the 2018 season. Girardi led the Yankees to three division titles and one World Series championship during his ten years of managing the club. The Yankees were 910–710 (.562) under Girardi. On December 1, 2017, former professional baseball player Aaron Boone was hired as the team's new manager. He had no previous coaching or managerial experience.

==== In-season ====
Team	Former manager	Interim manager	Reason for leaving	New manager	Story/accomplishments
Cincinnati Reds	Bryan Price	Jim Riggleman	Fired	David Bell	Price was fired on April 19 after starting the season with a 3–15 (.167) record. In four seasons, Price finished with a 279–387 (.419) record with no playoff appearances. Bench coach Jim Riggleman was selected as the interim manager. His previous managerial experience included stints with the Padres, Cubs, Mariners, and Nationals. He had been a manager in the Reds' minor league system since 2012. On October 21, 2018, the Reds named David Bell as their new manager, signing him to a three-year contract with a club option for 2022.
St. Louis Cardinals	Mike Matheny	Mike Shildt	Fired	Mike Shildt	Matheny was fired on July 14 after starting the season with a 47–46 (.505) record. In seven seasons, Matheny finished with a 591–473 (.555) record with four playoff appearances, winning the National League pennant in 2013. Hitting coach John Mabry and assistant hitting coach Bill Mueller were also dismissed, and bench coach Mike Shildt was named interim manager. Shildt had no major league managing experience but had managed in the Cardinals minor league system. On August 28, Shildt's "interim" title was dropped as he was named the new Cardinals manager.
Texas Rangers	Jeff Banister	Don Wakamatsu	Fired	Chris Woodward	Banister was fired on September 21 after four seasons with a record of 325–313 (.509) record. Banister finished in first place in his first two seasons as manager and amassed a 2–6 (.250) in the playoffs. Bench coach Don Wakamatsu was selected as the interim manager. On November 2, it was announced that Los Angeles Dodgers third-base coach Chris Woodward would be named the Rangers manager.

== League leaders ==
=== American League ===
Hitting leaders
Stat	Player	Total
AVG	Mookie Betts (BOS)	.346
OPS	Mike Trout (LAA)	1.088
HR	Khris Davis (OAK)	48
RBI	J. D. Martinez (BOS)	130
R	Mookie Betts (BOS); Francisco Lindor (CLE)	129
H	Whit Merrifield (KC)	192
SB	Whit Merrifield (KC)	45

Pitching leaders
Stat	Player	Total
W	Blake Snell (TB)	21
L	Dylan Bundy (BAL); James Shields (CWS)	16
ERA	Blake Snell (TB)	1.89
K	Justin Verlander (HOU)	290
IP	Corey Kluber (CLE)	215.0
SV	Edwin Díaz (SEA)	57
WHIP	Justin Verlander (HOU)	0.902

=== National League ===
Hitting leaders
Stat	Player	Total
AVG	Christian Yelich (MIL)	.326
OPS	Christian Yelich (MIL)	1.000
HR	Nolan Arenado (COL)	38
RBI	Javier Baez (CHC)	111
R	Charlie Blackmon (COL)	119
H	Freddie Freeman (ATL)	191
SB	Trea Turner (WSH)	43

Pitching leaders
Stat	Player	Total
W	Jon Lester (CHC); Miles Mikolas (STL); Max Scherzer (WSH)	18
L	Tanner Roark (WSH)	15
ERA	Jacob deGrom (NYM)	1.70
K	Max Scherzer (WSH)	300
IP	Max Scherzer (WSH)	220.2
SV	Wade Davis (COL)	43
WHIP	Max Scherzer (WSH)	0.911

== Milestones ==
=== Batters ===
- Matt Davidson (CWS):
  - Became the fourth player in the live-ball era (since 1920) to hit three home runs on opening day joining Dmitri Young (2005), Tuffy Rhodes (1994), and George Bell (1988). Davidson accomplished this feat on March 29 against the Kansas City Royals.
- George Springer (HOU):
  - With his Opening Day lead-off home run on March 29 against the Texas Rangers, Springer became the first player in Major League history to lead off back-to-back seasons with a home run.
- Joe Panik (SF):
  - Became the first player in Major League history to hit a home run in consecutive 1–0 victories by his team on March 30.
  - Became the first player in Major League history to score his team's first three runs in a season off solo home runs. This was during the team's home opener on April 3.
- Adrián Beltré (TEX):
  - With a second-inning double on April 5 against the Oakland Athletics, Beltré became the all-time leader in hits by a player from Latin America. Beltré, from the Dominican Republic, passed Rod Carew of Panama with the 3,054th hit in his career.
  - With a fourth-inning double on June 13 against the Los Angeles Dodgers, Beltré became the all-time leader in hits by a non-U.S. native, passing Ichiro Suzuki.
  - Recorded his 1,500th run scored in the sixth inning on July 30 against the Arizona Diamondbacks. He became the 73rd player to reach this mark.
- Joe Mauer (MIN):
  - Recorded his 2,000th career hit with a single in the seventh inning against the Chicago White Sox on April 12. He became the 287th player to reach this mark.
- Miguel Cabrera (DET):
  - Recorded his 550th career double in the seventh inning against the Baltimore Orioles on April 19. He became the 30th player to reach this mark.
- Ryan Braun (MIL):
  - Recorded his 1,000th career RBI with a pinch-hit home run in the sixth inning against the Miami Marlins on April 19. He became the 285th player to reach this mark.
- Rajai Davis (CLE):
  - Recorded his 400th career stolen base by stealing second base in the third inning against the Toronto Blue Jays on May 3. He became the 75th player to reach this mark.
- Albert Pujols (LAA):
  - Recorded his 3,000th career hit with a single in the fifth inning against the Seattle Mariners on May 4. He became the 32nd player to reach this mark. Pujols also becomes the fourth player in Major League history to collect 3,000 hits and hit 600 home runs in his career, joining Hank Aaron, Willie Mays and Alex Rodriguez.
- Gleyber Torres (NYY):
  - On May 25 Torres became the youngest player in American League history with home runs in four consecutive games. He homered against the Texas Rangers in back-to-back games as well as the Los Angeles Angels.
- Shin-Soo Choo (TEX):
  - Became the all-time leader in Major League history for most home runs hit by a player from Asia by hitting his 176th career home run in the 10th inning against the Kansas City Royals on May 26. He passed Hideki Matsui for the record.
- Wil Myers (SD):
  - Became the first player in Major League history to hit three home runs in a game that was lost by double-digits. The team lost 20–5 against the Arizona Diamondbacks on July 7.
- Lourdes Gurriel Jr. (TOR):
  - Became the first rookie of the live-ball era to have 11 consecutive multi-hit games, by collecting three hits against the Chicago White Sox on July 29. The last Major League rookie to accomplish such a feat was Shoeless Joe Jackson in 1911.
- Mike Trout (LAA):
  - With his 30th home run of the season on July 31 against the Tampa Bay Rays, Trout became the second player in Major League history (the other being Willie Mays) to hit 30 home runs and steal 20 bases in three seasons before their age-26 campaigns.
- José Reyes (NYM):
  - Became the second player in Major League history to give up multiple home runs as a pitcher in one game (on July 31) and hit multiple home runs the following game (on August 1). Both games were against the Washington Nationals. The only other player to accomplish this was Cap Anson from the Chicago White Stockings who gave up two home runs on August 5, 1884, and hit three home runs the following game on August 6. Both games were against the Cleveland Blues.
- Ronald Acuña Jr./Ozzie Albies (ATL):
  - With his 20th home run on the season by Acuna on August 22 against the Pittsburgh Pirates, Acuna and Albies became the first teammates under the age of 22 in Major League history to hit 20+ home runs in the same season.
- Christian Yelich (MIL):
  - With a 6-for-6 day and hitting for the cycle on August 29 against the Cincinnati Reds, Yelich became the fourth player in Major League history to record six hits while also hitting for the cycle. He is the first to accomplish the feat since Ian Kinsler in 2009.
  - With his cycle on September 17, Yelich became the first player in Major League history to have multiple cycles against the same team in the same season.
- Rowdy Tellez (TOR):
  - Became the first player in Major League history (in the live-ball era) to record extra-base hits in each of his first three plate appearances. Tellez recorded pinch-hit double during his debut against the Tampa Bay Rays on September 5. On September 6, Tellez doubled in the second and fourth innings against the Cleveland Indians. Tellez flied out in his next at bat.
- Juan Soto (WSH):
  - With his multi-homer game against the Philadelphia Phillies on September 11, Soto became the first teenager in Major League history to have three multi-homer games in a season.
- Trevor Story (COL):
  - With his first-inning double on September 11 against the Arizona Diamondbacks, Story became the first shortstop in National League history to amass 30+ home runs, 40+ doubles and drive in more than 100 runs in a season.
- Brock Holt (BOS):
  - Became the first player in Major League history to hit for the cycle in a postseason game, doing so in a 16–1 rout in Game 3 of the 2018 American League Division Series on October 8 against the New York Yankees.

=== Pitchers ===
==== No-hitters ====
- Sean Manaea (OAK):
  - Threw his first career no-hitter by defeating the Boston Red Sox 3–0 on April 21, at the Oakland Coliseum. Manaea struck out ten batters, walked two and threw one wild pitch, throwing 75 of his 108 pitches for strikes. The game included two controversial out calls: in the fifth inning, a batter reached base on an error that Manaea reportedly assumed was ruled a hit; in the sixth inning, Andrew Benintendi was initially ruled safe on an infield single, but after some discussion by the umpiring crew, he was called out for having left the baseline on the play. Benintendi later called this a "missed call" and insinuated that the umpires were biased in favor of Manaea.
- Walker Buehler/Tony Cingrani/Yimi García/Adam Liberatore (LAD):
  - Threw the first combined no-hitter in franchise history by defeating the San Diego Padres 4–0 on May 4, during a series played at the Estadio de Béisbol in Monterrey, Mexico. Buehler struck out eight and walked three over six innings, throwing 59 of his 93 pitches for strikes. Cingrani struck out one and walked two over one inning, throwing 13 of 24 pitches for strikes. García struck out two and walked none over one inning, throwing 11 of 14 pitches for strikes. Liberatore also did not walk a batter, striking out two and throwing 10 of 15 pitches for strikes. This was the 12th combined no-hitter in Major League history and the 23rd no-hitter in franchise history.
- James Paxton (SEA):
  - Threw his first career no-hitter, and the sixth in franchise history, by defeating the Toronto Blue Jays 5–0 on May 8, at Rogers Centre. Paxton struck out seven and walked three, throwing 64 of his 99 pitches for strikes. Paxton became the second Canadian-born player to throw a no-hitter, joining Dick Fowler of the 1945 Philadelphia Athletics. As the game was played in Toronto, this made Canada the third country in which an MLB no-hitter was thrown in 2018, the other two being the US and Mexico.

==== Other pitching accomplishments ====
- Max Scherzer (WSH):
  - Became the second pitcher in the live-ball era (since 1920) to pitch a shutout, strike out at least 10 batters and steal a base in the same game by accomplishing this feat on April 9 against the Atlanta Braves. He joins Nolan Ryan who did this against the Pittsburgh Pirates on May 16, 1984.
  - Became the first pitcher in Major League history to finish with no more than 6 1/3 innings and strike out 15 batters in a 5–4 win against the Philadelphia Phillies on May 6. He did not factor into the decision.
  - Recorded his 150th career win with a victory against the Baltimore Orioles on May 30. He became the 259th player to reach this mark.
  - With his first-inning strikeout of Matt Carpenter of the St. Louis Cardinals on September 3, Scherzer recorded his fifth consecutive season of at least 250 strikeouts. He becomes the second pitcher in Major League history to accomplish this feat. He joins Randy Johnson who accomplished this in six consecutive seasons from 1997 to 2002.
  - With his seventh-inning strikeout of Austin Dean of the Miami Marlins on September 25, Scherzer reached his 300th strikeout of the season. He becomes the 17th pitcher since 1900 to record 300 strikeouts in a season.
- Roberto Osuna (HOU)/(TOR):
  - On April 10, at the age of 23 years and 62 days, Osuna became the youngest pitcher in Major League history to record his 100th career save. Osuna was over a year younger than the previous record holder Francisco Rodríguez, who had accomplished the feat at the age of 24 years and 246 days.
- Josh Hader (MIL):
  - Became the first pitcher in Major League history to strike out eight batters in an outing of less than three innings. Hader struck out eight Cincinnati Reds on April 30 in 2 2/3 innings.
- Craig Kimbrel (BOS):
  - Recorded his 300th career save by closing out a 6–5 win over the Texas Rangers on May 5. He is the 29th player, and the fastest, to reach this mark.
- Justin Verlander (HOU):
  - Recorded his 2,500th career strikeout by fanning Shohei Ohtani of the Los Angeles Angels on May 16. He became the 33rd player to reach this mark.
  - Recorded his 200th career victory by defeating the Oakland Athletics on August 19. He became the 117th player to reach this mark.
- Cole Hamels (CHC)/(TEX):
  - Recorded his 150th career win with a victory against the New York Yankees on May 22. He became the 258th player to reach this mark
- Bartolo Colón (TEX):
  - Recorded his 2,500th career strikeout by getting Max Muncy of the Los Angeles Dodgers on June 12. He became the 34th player to reach this mark.
  - With his victory on June 18 against the Kansas City Royals, Colón became the winningest pitcher in Major League history from the Dominican Republic. His 244th career win passed Hall of Famer Juan Marichal.
  - With his victory on August 7 against the Seattle Mariners, Colón also became the winningest Latin American-born pitcher in Major League history, passing Nicaragua's Dennis Martínez.
- Clayton Kershaw (LAD):
  - Recorded his 150th career win with a victory against the Seattle Mariners on August 19. He became the 260th player to reach this mark.
- Edwin Díaz (SEA):
  - Recorded his 50th save of the season by closing out a win against the Arizona Diamondbacks on August 25. With this save, he became the 16th player in Major League history, and the youngest to do so, to record 50 saves.
- Jacob deGrom (NYM):
  - Against the Miami Marlins on September 11, deGrom allowed two runs in seven innings of work. This was his 26th consecutive start of allowing three or fewer runs, setting a new Major League record. The old record was set by Leslie "King" Cole in 1910.
  - With his quality start—at least six innings pitched and three earned runs or fewer allowed—on September 21 against the Washington Nationals, deGrom set the Major League record for most consecutive quality starts in history with his 23rd straight. This broke the record set by Bob Gibson (1968) and Chris Carpenter (2005).
- German Marquez (COL):
  - Tied a modern Major League record (since 1900) by fanning the first eight Philadelphia Phillies he faced on September 26. He tied a record that is shared by Jim Deshaies and Jacob deGrom.

=== Miscellaneous ===
- The Arizona Diamondbacks became the first National League team since the 1907 Cubs to start the season with nine consecutive series wins.
- For the first time in Major League history, there were more strikeouts than hits in a month. At the end of April, there were 7,335 strikeouts and 6,992 hits. This happened again two other times. In June, there were 6,776 strikeouts and 6,641 hits. In September, there were 7,074 strikeouts and 6,641 hits.
- Houston Astros:
  - broke the record for the fewest runs allowed since 1920 (live-ball era) in a 50-game span with 126 runs. The previous record was 128 set by the Cleveland Indians in 1968.
  - On August 29, the Houston Astros' Tyler White hit the 81st walk-off home run of the season, which set a Major League single-season record, breaking the previous record set in 2004.
  - Set an American League record for fewest runs allowed by a pitching staff in the Designated Hitter era with 534 runs allowed. The previous record was 551 runs allowed by the Oakland Athletics in 1974. The Astros also set a Major League record for strikeouts by a pitching staff with 1,687 total strikeouts on the 2018 season. The previous record was 1,614 strikeouts by the Cleveland Indians in 2017.
- On August 16, the Texas Rangers pulled off a 5–4 triple play in their 8–6 win over the Los Angeles Angels. It was only the third 5–4 triple play in the expansion era (since 1961), with the most recent one having occurred in 2007. In addition, it was the first triple play since 1912 in which the batter was not retired.
- Francisco Arcia (LAA):
  - On September 20 against the Oakland Athletics, Arcia became the first player in Major League history to catch, pitch, and hit a home run in the same game.
- For the first time in Major League history, there were more strikeouts than hits for the season. Hitters struck out 41,207 times and recorded 41,019 hits.
- The Yankees eclipsed the 1997 Mariners for the most home runs in a single season. They would finish the season with 267. The Yankees are also the first team in major league history to score at least 20 home runs in each of the nine batting order positions.
- On October 26 the Boston Red Sox and Los Angeles Dodgers squared off in what would become the longest World Series game in history, both by innings and time. Game 3 ran 18 innings over 7 hours and 20 minutes. The Dodgers would emerge victorious 3–2, off an opposite field walk-off home run hit by Max Muncy. This would cut Boston's lead in the series to 2–1.
- When the Red Sox won the World Series on October 28, manager Alex Cora, Boston's first nonwhite manager, became the first Puerto Rican manager in MLB history to win a World Series.
- Shohei Ohtani, the BBWAA Rookie of the Year winner, became the fourth player from Japan to win the award.
- For the first time in Major League history, there were no pitchers that achieve multiple complete-game shutouts in a single season. A total of 18 pitchers have a complete-game shutout this season, with each of them doing it only once throughout the season.

== Awards and honors ==
=== Regular season ===
Baseball Writers' Association of America Awards
BBWAA Award	National League	American League
Rookie of the Year	Ronald Acuña Jr. (ATL)	Shohei Ohtani (LAA)
Cy Young Award	Jacob deGrom (NYM)	Blake Snell (TB)
Manager of the Year	Brian Snitker (ATL)	Bob Melvin (OAK)
Most Valuable Player	Christian Yelich (MIL)	Mookie Betts (BOS)
Gold Glove Awards
Position	National League	American League
Pitcher	Zack Greinke (AZ)	Dallas Keuchel (HOU)
Catcher	Yadier Molina (STL)	Salvador Pérez (KC)
1st Base	Freddie Freeman (ATL); Anthony Rizzo (CHC)	Matt Olson (OAK)
2nd Base	DJ LeMahieu (COL)	Ian Kinsler (BOS)/(LAA)
3rd Base	Nolan Arenado (COL)	Matt Chapman (OAK)
Shortstop	Nick Ahmed (AZ)	Andrelton Simmons (LAA)
Left field	Corey Dickerson (PIT)	Alex Gordon (KC)
Center field	Ender Inciarte (ATL)	Jackie Bradley Jr. (BOS)
Right field	Nick Markakis (ATL)	Mookie Betts (BOS)
Silver Slugger Awards
Pitcher/Designated Hitter	German Marquez (COL)	J.D. Martinez (BOS)
Catcher	J. T. Realmuto (MIA)	Salvador Perez (KC)
1st Base	Paul Goldschmidt (AZ)	Jose Abreu (CWS)
2nd Base	Javier Baez (CHC)	Jose Altuve (HOU)
3rd Base	Nolan Arenado (COL)	José Ramírez (CLE)
Shortstop	Trevor Story (COL)	Francisco Lindor (CLE)
Outfield	Nick Markakis (ATL)	Mookie Betts (BOS)
Outfield	David Peralta (AZ)	J.D. Martinez (BOS)
Outfield	Christian Yelich (MIL)	Mike Trout (LAA)

=== Other awards ===
- The Sporting News Player of the Year Award: Mookie Betts (BOS)
- Comeback Players of the Year: David Price (BOS, American); Jonny Venters (ATL, National)
- Hank Aaron Award: J.D. Martinez (BOS, American); Christian Yelich (MIL, National)
- Edgar Martínez Award (Best designated hitter): Khris Davis (OAK)
- Roberto Clemente Award (Humanitarian): Yadier Molina (STL)
- Mariano Rivera AL Reliever of the Year Award (Best AL reliever): Edwin Díaz (SEA)
- Trevor Hoffman NL Reliever of the Year Award (Best NL reliever): Josh Hader (MIL)
- Warren Spahn Award (Best left-handed pitcher): Blake Snell (TB)

Fielding Bible Awards
Position	Player
Pitcher	Zack Greinke (AZ)
Catcher	Jeff Mathis (AZ)
1st Base	Matt Olson (OAK)
2nd Base	Kolten Wong (STL)
3rd Base	Matt Chapman (OAK)
Shortstop	Andrelton Simmons (LAA)
Left Field	Alex Gordon (KC)
Center Field	Lorenzo Cain (MIL)
Right Field	Mookie Betts (BOS)
Multi-position	Javier Baez (CHC)

=== Monthly awards ===
==== Player of the Month ====
Month	American League	National League
April	Didi Gregorius	A. J. Pollock
May	Francisco Lindor	Scooter Gennett
June	Alex Bregman	Paul Goldschmidt
July	José Ramírez	Matt Carpenter
August	J.D. Martinez	Justin Turner
September	Mike Trout	Christian Yelich

==== Pitcher of the Month ====
Month	American League	National League
April	Sean Manaea	Max Scherzer
May	Justin Verlander	Max Scherzer
June	Chris Sale	Jon Lester
July	Chris Sale	Zack Greinke
August	Blake Snell	Cole Hamels
September	Blake Snell	German Marquez

==== Rookie of the Month ====
Month	American League	National League
April	Shohei Ohtani	Christian Villanueva
May	Gleyber Torres	Austin Meadows
June	Miguel Andújar	Juan Soto
July	Lourdes Gurriel Jr.	Juan Soto
August	Miguel Andújar	Ronald Acuña Jr.
September	Shohei Ohtani	Juan Soto

==== Reliever of the Month ====
Month	American League	National League
April	Edwin Díaz	Josh Hader
May	Blake Treinen	Brad Hand
June	Edwin Díaz	Kyle Barraclough
July	Edwin Díaz	Felipe Vázquez
August	Edwin Díaz	Héctor Neris
September	Blake Treinen	Corey Knebel

== Home field attendance and payroll ==
Team name	Wins	%±	Home attendance	%±	Per game	Est. payroll	%±
Los Angeles Dodgers	92	−11.5%	3,857,500	2.4%	47,043	$164,703,429	−18.2%
New York Yankees	100	9.9%	3,482,855	10.4%	42,998	$160,743,032	−11.9%
St. Louis Cardinals	88	6.0%	3,403,587	−1.3%	42,020	$157,713,667	21.6%
Chicago Cubs	95	3.3%	3,181,089	−0.6%	38,794	$205,373,881	15.9%
San Francisco Giants	73	14.1%	3,156,185	−4.5%	38,965	$202,060,277	13.9%
Los Angeles Angels	80	0.0%	3,020,216	0.0%	37,287	$166,849,666	−7.9%
Colorado Rockies	91	4.6%	3,015,880	2.1%	37,233	$136,658,500	28.1%
Houston Astros	103	2.0%	2,980,549	24.0%	36,797	$172,781,200	9.6%
Boston Red Sox	108	16.1%	2,895,575	−0.8%	35,748	$222,205,000	10.8%
Milwaukee Brewers	96	11.6%	2,850,875	8.5%	35,196	$109,295,700	59.7%
Atlanta Braves	90	25.0%	2,555,781	2.0%	31,553	$115,848,667	−3.2%
Washington Nationals	82	−15.5%	2,529,604	0.2%	31,230	$188,886,699	7.6%
Toronto Blue Jays	73	−3.9%	2,325,281	−27.4%	28,707	$151,670,772	−4.5%
Seattle Mariners	89	14.1%	2,299,489	7.7%	28,389	$157,090,065	−8.9%
Arizona Diamondbacks	82	−11.8%	2,242,695	5.1%	27,688	$134,850,600	26.5%
New York Mets	77	10.0%	2,224,995	−9.6%	27,469	$161,403,844	−8.6%
San Diego Padres	66	−7.0%	2,168,536	1.4%	26,772	$93,821,067	90.5%
Philadelphia Phillies	80	21.2%	2,158,124	13.3%	26,644	$93,874,333	8.8%
Texas Rangers	67	−14.1%	2,107,107	−16.0%	26,014	$106,099,628	−48.8%
Minnesota Twins	78	−8.2%	1,959,197	−4.5%	24,188	$110,275,000	6.1%
Cleveland Indians	91	−10.8%	1,926,701	−5.9%	23,786	$143,375,233	25.3%
Detroit Tigers	64	0.0%	1,856,970	−20.0%	22,926	$111,531,000	−5.8%
Kansas City Royals	58	−27.5%	1,665,107	−25.0%	20,557	$95,199,167	−25.4%
Cincinnati Reds	67	−1.5%	1,629,356	−11.3%	20,116	$94,587,500	19.3%
Chicago White Sox	62	−7.5%	1,608,817	−1.3%	19,862	$75,092,000	−23.3%
Oakland Athletics	97	29.3%	1,573,616	6.6%	19,427	$69,883,333	35.5%
Baltimore Orioles	47	−37.3%	1,564,192	−22.9%	19,311	$141,555,833	−12.4%
Pittsburgh Pirates	82	9.3%	1,465,316	−23.7%	18,316	$88,141,000	−14.4%
Tampa Bay Rays	90	12.5%	1,154,973	−7.9%	14,259	$46,011,667	−42.1%
Miami Marlins	63	−18.2%	811,104	−48.8%	10,014	$86,515,143	−22.5%

== Uniforms ==
=== Wholesale changes ===
The Detroit Tigers modified the Olde English 'D' on the home jersey to match the 'D' on the cap. Other than a one-season hiatus of 'D' usage in 1960, this is the first major change to the Tigers' home jersey since 1934.

The Cleveland Indians have confirmed this will be the final season using the Chief Wahoo logo on its uniforms. It will be replaced at the start of the 2019 season. The team wore a Wahoo-less uniform through their September 6–9 series with the Blue Jays, as the team had been sued unsuccessfully by a group in Ontario in October 2016 to prevent the team from donning the logo during Toronto home games through the 2016 ALCS.

=== Alternate changes ===
The Oakland Athletics added a kelly green alternate jersey to commemorate the franchise's 50th anniversary in Oakland. The uniforms are used during every Friday home game.

The Washington Nationals added a second navy blue jersey to commemorate the team's hosting of the 2018 All-Star Game. The uniform features the script "Nationals" in white with red trim and numerals in red with white trim.

Both the Cincinnati Reds and the Pittsburgh Pirates replaced their camouflage uniforms with new white alternate jerseys featuring olive and military green logos, letters and numbers.

=== Anniversaries and special events ===
The following teams will wear commemorative patches for special occasions:

Team	Special occasion
All Teams	"MSD" patch in memory of the victims of the Stoneman Douglas High School shooting (February 23)
All Teams	#42 patch for Jackie Robinson Day (April 15)
All Teams	Pink ribbons for breast cancer awareness (May 13, Mother's Day)
All Teams	"Play Ball" patch in partnership with USA Baseball and USA Softball (June 2–3)
All Teams	Blue ribbons for prostate cancer awareness (June 17, Father's Day)
All Teams	American flag patch as well as all teams wearing patriotic themed jerseys, undershirts and socks for Independence Day. (July 2–4)
All Teams	Gold ribbons for childhood cancer awareness (August 31)
Atlanta Braves	50th anniversary of the assassination of Martin Luther King Jr. (April 4)
Arizona Diamondbacks	20th anniversary of the franchise
Chicago Cubs	"MSD" patch in memory of the victims of the Stoneman Douglas High School shooting (March 29)
Cleveland Indians	Jim Thome number retirement (August 18)
Colorado Rockies	25th anniversary of the franchise
Detroit Tigers	Jack Morris number retirement (August 12)
Detroit Tigers	Alan Trammell number retirement (August 26)
Detroit Tigers	50th anniversary of the 1968 World Championship (September 7–9)
Houston Astros	2017 World Series Championship (April 2)
Kansas City Royals	50th season of the franchise
Los Angeles Dodgers	60th anniversary in Los Angeles
Miami Marlins	25th anniversary of the franchise (began as the Florida Marlins)
Miami Marlins	"MSD" patch in memory of the victims of the Stoneman Douglas High School shooting (March 29 – April 1)
Milwaukee Brewers	"Nellie" patch in memory of Dave Nelson (June 21–24)
New York Mets	Autograph patch in memory of Rusty Staub (from March 31 onwards)
Oakland Athletics	50th anniversary in Oakland
Philadelphia Phillies	10th Anniversary of 2008 World Series Team
San Diego Padres	KT and RP patches in memory of Kevin Towers and Rob Picciolo (May 12, and other Wednesday home games)
San Francisco Giants	60th anniversary in San Francisco
St. Louis Cardinals	#2 patch in memory of Red Schoendienst (from June 11 onwards)
Tampa Bay Rays	20th anniversary of the franchise (originally Devil Rays)
Toronto Blue Jays	#32 patch in memory of Roy Halladay
Toronto Blue Jays	25th anniversary of 1993 World Series Championship
Washington Nationals	2018 All Star Game

=== Other uniforms ===
As is the custom for the reigning World Series champions, the Astros wore gold-lettered uniforms at their home opener April 2 and 3.

Players, managers and coaches wore No. 42 on April 15, the 71st anniversary of Jackie Robinson's debut in the majors.

The Orioles wore special caps and green uniforms on April 22, Earth Day.

The Reds and Diamondbacks wore Spanish language "Los Rojos" and "Los D-backs" uniforms May 5, Cinco de Mayo. The Diamondbacks wore them again September 8. The Reds wore them again September 28.

The Royals wore an alternate uniform with a crown atop the R, and a cap with a crown instead of the "KC", on June 30 in Seattle.

The Blue Jays wore red uniforms on July 1, Canada Day. They wore a cap with a gold maple leaf, as well.

All US-based teams wore Stars and Stripes caps and uniforms from July 2–4, ending with Independence Day. Teams wore caps denoting what league they play for (there were nine interleague series during the time period).

For the second straight year, MLB sponsored Players Weekend, an event for which all teams wore special uniforms with design cues reminiscent of typical Little League uniforms. The event was held August 24 to 26, again coinciding with the final weekend of the Little League World Series.

The Royals wore Spanish-language "Los Reales" uniforms September 1.

The Orioles wore Braille uniforms September 18 to mark the 40th anniversary of the National Federation of the Blind's headquarters moving to Baltimore. They became the first pro sports team ever to wear such uniforms. The uniforms had the name "Orioles" in Braille, and the players' last names were in Braille.

=== Throwbacks ===
The Phillies will wear their 1980s powder blue uniforms for select Thursday home games.

The Athletics and White Sox wore 1968 throwbacks April 17 to mark the 50th anniversary of the Athletics' first season in Oakland.

The Tigers and Royals wore Negro leagues throwbacks May 6. The Tigers wore the uniforms of the Detroit Stars, and the Royals wore the uniforms of the Kansas City Monarchs.

The Padres wore 1998 throwbacks May 12 to mark the 20th anniversary of their 1998 NL title. They will wear them again at select Wednesday games.

The Royals wore 1969 throwbacks May 19 to mark the franchise's 50th season. The uniforms also had the MLB 100th anniversary patch, which all teams wore that season.

The White Sox and Brewers wore 1980s throwbacks June 2 and 3.

The Marlins wore 1993 throwbacks June 8 to 10 to mark their 25th anniversary.

The Braves wore 1974 throwbacks June 22 and 23 to celebrate Hank Aaron Heritage Weekend.

The Mariners marked the 20th anniversary of their 1998 "Turn Ahead the Clock" promotion by wearing the uniforms from that game June 30 against Kansas City.

The Brewers and Pirates wore Negro league throwbacks July 13. The Brewers wore the uniforms of the Milwaukee Bears, and the Pirates wore the uniforms of the Pittsburgh Crawfords.

The Brewers wore Milwaukee Bears uniforms August 2. Their opponents, the Rockies, wore their regular uniforms.

The Mariners and Astros wore throwbacks on August 10; the Mariners wore their 1979 throwbacks, and the Astros wore their "Tequila Sunrise" uniforms.

The Angels wore California Angels throwbacks from 1976 to 1985 on August 27.

The Rays wore their 1998 inaugural throwbacks on March 31 against the Boston Red Sox, on June 9 against the Seattle Mariners, and on June 23 against the New York Yankees, along with September 8 against the Baltimore Orioles.

The Tigers wore their 1968 road uniforms September 8 at home to mark the 50th anniversary of their winning the 1968 World Series title.

== Broadcast rights ==
=== Television ===
==== National ====
This was the fifth year of the current eight-year deals with Fox Sports, ESPN and TBS. Fox aired eight weeks of baseball on Saturday Nights leading up to the 2018 Major League Baseball All-Star Game which also aired on Fox. Fox also televised Saturday afternoon games for the last four weeks of the regular season. FS1 televised games on Tuesday and on Saturdays both during the afternoon and night. ESPN televised games on its flagship telecast Sunday Night Baseball as well as Monday and Wednesday Nights. TBS televised Sunday afternoon games for the last 13 weeks of the regular season. Fox and ESPN Sunday Night Baseball telecasts were exclusive; all other national telecasts were subject to local blackout.

TBS televised the American League Wild Card Game, Division Series and televised the Championship Series. ESPN televised the National League Wild Card, along with the National League West and Central tie-breaker games. FS1 and MLB Network televised the National League Division Series. Fox and FS1 televised the National League Championship Series. The World Series aired exclusively on Fox for the 19th consecutive year.

Prior to the season, Major League Baseball reached an exclusive agreement with Facebook to stream 25-games for free on Facebook Watch.

==== Local ====
On September 6, Fox Sports Detroit suspended Detroit Tigers play-by-play announcer Mario Impemba and color commentator Rod Allen for the remainder of the season after an alleged physical altercation that occurred on September 4, in which Allen reportedly placed Impemba in a choke hold at Chicago's Guaranteed Rate Field after a game they called between the Tigers and the Chicago White Sox, a claim Allen's agent has denied. Backup announcers Matt Shepard and Kirk Gibson replaced them for the rest of the season. It was later announced that Impemba and Allen's contracts were not renewed for future seasons, ending their 17 years together as broadcast partners.

=== Radio ===
==== Local ====
- The Minnesota Twins returned to Entercom's WCCO/Minneapolis after twelve years on KSTP, followed by the Twins-owned FM station KQGO; WCCO has been the flagship for the Twins' network for 46 of the team's 58 years of existence. Entercom also took over all existing play-by-play contracts from their newly acquired stations from CBS Radio after the two companies merged their radio assets on November 17, 2017.
- The Chicago White Sox took on a new flagship station in Tribune Broadcasting's WGN/Chicago, after Cumulus Media asked to void their agreement to carry the team's games on WLS as part of its Chapter 11 bankruptcy filing, and Cumulus ending several high-profile talent and sports rights agreements due to their cost. The deal allows WGN to return to MLB play-by-play after a three-year hiatus after the end of their long association with the Chicago Cubs, who moved to WBBM in the 2015 season, then WSCR in 2016. WGN had previously carried White Sox broadcasts from 1927 until 1943.
- The San Diego Padres obtained a new flagship station after Entercom moved the team's broadcasts from KBZT to KEGY (both FM stations), which had flipped from a contemporary hit radio format to a short-lived hot talk format at the beginning of the season. After the team and fans reacted negatively to the schedule and personalities surrounding Padres games following a controversial social media post involving a never-launched morning show (to the point of consideration by the Padres to void the broadcast contract only three games into the season), Entercom switched KEGY within two weeks to a straight sports radio format and new calls in KWFN.

==== National ====
- ESPN Radio aired its 21st season of national coverage, including Sunday Night Baseball, Saturday games, Opening Day and holiday games, the All-Star Game, and Home Run Derby, and the entire Major League Baseball postseason.

=== Digital ===
Nine regular season games were broadcast exclusively in the United States on Facebook Watch, beginning with the April 4 game between the New York Mets and Philadelphia Phillies.

== Retirements ==
- Kyle Lohse announced his retirement on May 10.
- Kris Medlen announced his retirement on May 27.
- Aaron Laffey announced his retirement on June 7 after allowing 14 runs (12 earned) in a minor league game.
- Brayan Pena announced his retirement on June 18.
- Jayson Werth announced his retirement on June 27.
- Shane Victorino announced his retirement on July 2 and retired on August 3 after signing a 1-day contract with the Philadelphia Phillies.
- Colby Rasmus announced his retirement on July 3.
- Chase Utley announced on July 13 that he would retire at the end of the season.
- Andre Ethier announced his retirement on July 25.
- Johnny Giavotella announced his retirement on August 11.
- Luke Hochevar announced his retirement on August 13.
- Brandon McCarthy announced on August 14 that he would retire at the end of the season.
- Victor Martinez announced on August 15 that he would retire at the end of the season.
- Ryan Howard announced his retirement on September 4.
- David Wright announced on September 13 that he would retire at the end of the season.
- Brad Ziegler announced his retirement on October 10.
- Joe Mauer announced his retirement on November 9.
- Adrián Beltré announced his retirement on November 20.
- Mike Napoli announced his retirement on December 8.
- Steve Johnson announced his retirement on December 21.
- Jaime García announced his retirement on January 9, 2019.
- Shawn Tolleson announced his retirement on January 16, 2019.
- Steve Delabar announced on February 4, 2019, that he is "ready to move on", though he hasn't filed the formal retirement paperwork at this time.
- Doug Fister announced his retirement on February 13, 2019.
- Rob Whalen announced his retirement on February 25, 2019.
- Peter Moylan announced his retirement from Major League Baseball on February 27, 2019.
- Julio Borbón announced his retirement on March 1, 2019.
- Charlie Furbush announced his retirement on March 7, 2019.
- Jon Moscot announced his retirement on March 7, 2019.

== Retired numbers ==
- Roy Halladay had his No. 32 retired posthumously by the Toronto Blue Jays on March 29. It is the third number retired by the franchise.
- Barry Bonds had his No. 25 retired by the San Francisco Giants on August 11. It is the 11th number retired by the franchise.
- Jack Morris had his No. 47 retired by the Detroit Tigers on August 12. It is the eighth number retired by the franchise.
- Jim Thome had his No. 25 retired by the Cleveland Indians on August 18. This is the ninth number retired by the franchise.
- Alan Trammell had his No. 3 retired by the Detroit Tigers on August 26. This is the ninth number retired by the franchise.

== See also ==
- 2018 in baseball
- 2018 Nippon Professional Baseball season
