= 2018 Oakland Athletics season =

2018 Oakland Athletics
- American League Wild Card winners
- League: American League
- Division: West
- Ballpark: Oakland Coliseum
- City: Oakland, California
- Record: 97–65 (.599)
- Divisional place: 2nd
- Owners: John Fisher
- General managers: Billy Beane
- Managers: Bob Melvin
- Television: NBC Sports California (Glen Kuiper, Ken Korach, Vince Cotroneo, Ray Fosse, Mark Mulder, Eric Chavez, Shooty Babitt, Dallas Braden)
- Radio: KGMZ-FM (Ken Korach, Vince Cotroneo, Ray Fosse, Mark Mulder)

The 2018 Oakland Athletics season was the 118th season for the Oakland Athletics franchise, all as members of the American League, and their golden jubilee as a franchise in Oakland. The Athletics were managed by Bob Melvin in his eighth year as manager of the Athletics. They played their home games at Oakland Coliseum as members of the American League West.

The Athletics began the season on March 29 against the Los Angeles Angels and finished the season on September 30 against the Angels as well. On September 24, they clinched their first playoff berth since 2014. They went on to lose to the New York Yankees in the Wild Card Game, 7–2. Their 97 wins were the most of any Athletics team since 2002.

== Offseason ==
The Oakland Athletics made a move to acquire outfielder Stephen Piscotty from the St. Louis Cardinals for minor leaguers Yairo Muñoz and Max Schrock on December 14, 2017. The trade allowed Piscotty to be closer to his mother who was suffering from ALS. His mother died on May 6, 2018.

== Regular season ==
=== Game log ===
2018 game log: 97–65 (Home: 50–31; Away: 47–34)
March/April: 14–14 (Home: 8–6; Away: 6–8)

#	Date	Opponent	Score	Win	Loss	Save	Attendance	Record	Streak
1	March 29	Angels	6–5 (11)	**Hatcher** (1–0)	Ramirez (0–1)	—	27,764	1–0	W1
2	March 30	Angels	1–2	Skaggs (1–0)	**Manaea** (0–1)	Parker (1)	27,665	1–1	L1
3	March 31	Angels	3–8	Shoemaker (1–0)	**Mengden** (0–1)	—	17,012	1–2	L2
4	April 1	Angels	4–7	Ohtani (1–0)	**Gossett** (0–1)	Middleton (1)	14,644	1–3	L3
5	April 2	Rangers	3–1	**Hatcher** (2–0)	Jepsen (0–1)	**Treinen** (1)	7,416	2–3	W1
6	April 3	Rangers	1–4	Hamels (1–1)	**Graveman** (0–1)	Kela (1)	9,157	2–4	L1
7	April 4	Rangers	6–2	**Manaea** (1–1)	Fister (1–1)	—	7,908	3–4	W1
8	April 5	Rangers	3–6	Pérez (1–0)	**Mengden** (0–2)	Kela (2)	10,132	3–5	L1
9	April 6	@ Angels	9–13	Johnson (1–0)	**Treinen** (0–1)	—	36,023	3–6	L2
10	April 7	@ Angels	7–3	**Triggs** (1–0)	Ramírez (0–2)	**Treinen** (2)	40,129	4–6	W1
11	April 8	@ Angels	1–7	Ohtani (2–0)	**Graveman** (0–2)	—	44,742	4–7	L1
12	April 10	@ Dodgers	0–4	Ryu (1–0)	**Manaea** (1–2)	Jansen (2)	41,243	4–8	L2
13	April 11	@ Dodgers	16–6	**Mengden** (1–2)	Wood (0–2)	—	49,394	5–8	W1
14	April 13	@ Mariners	4–7	Altavilla (1–1)	**Coulombe** (0–1)	Díaz (5)	25,352	5–9	L1
15	April 14	@ Mariners	8–10	Bradford (1–0)	**Graveman** (0–3)	Díaz (6)	29,013	5–10	L1
16	April 15	@ Mariners	2–1	**Manaea** (2–2)	Hernández (2–2)	**Treinen** (3)	25,882	6–10	W1
17	April 16	White Sox	8–1	**Mengden** (2–2)	López (0–2)	—	7,479	7–10	W2
18	April 17	White Sox	10–2	**Cahill** (1–0)	González (0–3)	—	46,028	8–10	W3
19	April 18	White Sox	12–11 (14)	**Trivino** (1–0)	Shields (1–1)	—	13,321	9–10	W4
20	April 20	Red Sox	3–7	Velázquez (3–0)	**Graveman** (0–4)	—	23,473	9–11	L1
21	April 21	Red Sox	3–0	**Manaea** (3–2)	Sale (1–1)	—	25,746	10–11	W1
22	April 22	Red Sox	4–1	**Treinen** (1–1)	Price (2–2)	—	29,804	11–11	W2
23	April 23	@ Rangers	9–4	**Buchter** (1–0)	Jepsen (0–3)	—	17,060	12–11	W3
24	April 24	@ Rangers	3–2	**Triggs** (2–0)	Hamels (1–4)	**Casilla** (1)	19,391	13–11	W4
25	April 25	@ Rangers	2–4	Chavez (1–0)	**Graveman** (0–5)	Kela (4)	19,121	13–12	L1
26	April 27	@ Astros	8–1	**Manaea** (4–2)	Keuchel (1–4)	—	32,636	14–12	W1
27	April 28	@ Astros	0–11	McCullers (4–1)	**Mengden** (2–3)	—	41,493	14–13	L1
28	April 29	@ Astros	4–8	Harris (1–1)	**Cahill** (1–1)	—	39,131	14–14	L2

May: 15–14 (Home: 7–9; Away: 8–5)

#	Date	Opponent	Score	Win	Loss	Save	Attendance	Record	Streak
29	May 1	@ Mariners	3–6	Hernández (4–2)	**Triggs** (2–1)	Díaz (12)	12,468	14–15	L3
30	May 2	@ Mariners	3–2	**Treinen** (2–1)	Díaz (0–1)	—	11,603	15–15	W1
31	May 3	@ Mariners	1–4	Bradford (3–0)	**Manaea** (4–3)	Díaz (13)	12,888	15–16	L1
32	May 4	Orioles	6–4	**Trivino** (2–0)	Brach (0–2)	**Treinen** (4)	12,723	16–16	W1
33	May 5	Orioles	2–0 (12)	**Hatcher** (3–0)	Araújo (1–3)	—	24,612	17–16	W2
34	May 6	Orioles	2–1	**Triggs** (3–1)	Cobb (0–4)	**Treinen** (5)	17,112	18–16	W3
35	May 7	Astros	2–16	Keuchel (2–5)	**Anderson** (0–1)	—	7,360	18–17	L1
36	May 8	Astros	2–4	McCullers (5–1)	**Manaea** (4–4)	Giles (4)	9,675	18–18	L2
37	May 9	Astros	1–4	Cole (4–1)	**Mengden** (2–4)	Giles (5)	18,044	18–19	L3
38	May 11	@ Yankees	10–5	**Graveman** (1–5)	Gray (2–3)	**Treinen** (6)	43,093	19–19	W1
39	May 12	@ Yankees	6–7 (11)	Cole (2–1)	**Hatcher** (3–1)	—	41,859	19–20	L1
40	May 13	@ Yankees	2–6	Severino (6–1)	**Anderson** (0–2)	—	40,538	19–21	L2
41	May 14	@ Red Sox	6–5	**Manaea** (5–4)	Porcello (5–1)	**Treinen** (7)	35,249	20–21	W1
42	May 15	@ Red Sox	5–3	**Mengden** (3–4)	Rodríguez (3–1)	**Treinen** (8)	34,906	21–21	W2
43	May 16	@ Red Sox	4–6	Sale (4–1)	**Cahill** (1–2)	Kimbrel (12)	34,947	21–22	L1
44	May 17	@ Blue Jays	10–5	**Petit** (1–0)	Sanchez (2–4)	—	22,893	22–22	W1
45	May 18	@ Blue Jays	3–1	**Coulombe** (1–1)	Estrada (2–4)	**Treinen** (9)	21,703	23–22	W2
46	May 19	@ Blue Jays	5–4	**Pagan** (1–0)	Clippard (4–1)	**Treinen** (10)	35,786	24–22	W3
47	May 20	@ Blue Jays	9–2	**Mengden** (4–4)	Biagini (0–3)	—	30,676	25–22	W4
48	May 22	Mariners	2–3 (10)	Vincent (3–1)	**Petit** (1–1)	Díaz (16)	9,408	25–23	L1
49	May 23	Mariners	0–1	Gonzales (4–3)	**Gossett** (0–2)	Díaz (17)	6,991	25–24	L2
50	May 24	Mariners	4–3	**Petit** (2–1)	Hernández (5–4)	**Treinen** (11)	12,633	26–24	W1
51	May 25	Diamondbacks	1–7	Corbin (5–1)	**Manaea** (5–5)	—	22,691	26–25	L1
52	May 26	Diamondbacks	3–0	**Mengden** (5–4)	Buchholz (0–1)	—	17,580	27–25	W1
53	May 27	Diamondbacks	2–1	**Montas** (1–0)	Greinke (3–4)	**Treinen** (12)	13,947	28–25	W2
54	May 28	Rays	0–1 (13)	Stanek (1–0)	**Hatcher** (3–2)	Venters (1)	10,881	28–26	L1
55	May 29	Rays	3–4	Snell (7–3)	**Gossett** (0–3)	Romo (1)	7,521	28–27	L2
56	May 30	Rays	0–6	Eovaldi (1–0)	**Manaea** (5–6)	—	6,705	28–28	L3
57	May 31	Rays	7–3	**Mengden** (6–4)	Stanek (1–1)	**Treinen** (13)	12,070	29–28	W1

June: 17–10 (Home: 7–5; Away: 10–5)

#	Date	Opponent	Score	Win	Loss	Save	Attendance	Record	Streak
58	June 1	@ Royals	16–0	**Montas** (2–0)	Kennedy (1–6)	—	23,413	30–28	W2
59	June 2	@ Royals	4–5	Hill (1–1)	**Petit** (2–2)	Herrera (13)	24,553	30–29	L1
60	June 3	@ Royals	5–1	**Trivino** (3–0)	Junis (5–5)	—	19,424	31–29	W1
61	June 5	@ Rangers	4–7	Martin (1–1)	**Trivino** (3–1)	Kela (14)	19,470	31–30	L1
62	June 6	@ Rangers	2–8	Colón (3–3)	**Mengden** (6–5)	—	22,335	31–31	L2
63	June 7	Royals	4–1	**Blackburn** (1–0)	Hammel (2–6)	**Treinen** (14)	7,963	32–31	W1
64	June 8	Royals	7–2	**Montas** (3–0)	Junis (5–6)	**Trivino** (1)	10,132	33–31	W2
65	June 9	Royals	0–2	Duffy (3–6)	**Bassitt** (0–1)	Herrera (14)	16,208	33–32	L1
66	June 10	Royals	3–2	**Treinen** (3–1)	Adam (0–1)	—	15,548	34–32	W1
67	June 12	Astros	3–6	McCullers (8–3)	**Mengden** (6–6)	Giles (11)	11,742	34–33	L1
68	June 13	Astros	5–13	Cole (8–1)	**Blackburn** (1–1)	—	9,164	34–34	L2
69	June 14	Astros	3–7	Verlander (9–2)	**Montas** (3–1)	—	13,009	34–35	L3
70	June 15	Angels	4–8	Skaggs (6–4)	**Bassitt** (0–2)	—	18,356	34–36	L4
71	June 16	Angels	6–4	**Manaea** (6–6)	Ramirez (2–3)	**Treinen** (15)	19,185	35–36	W1
72	June 17	Angels	6–5 (11)	**Treinen** (4–1)	Jewell (0–1)	—	21,217	36–36	W2
73	June 19	@ Padres	4–2 (10)	**Trivino** (4–1)	Cimber (3–3)	**Treinen** (16)	37,485	37–36	W3
74	June 20	@ Padres	12–4	**Montas** (4–1)	Lucchesi (3–3)	—	28,225	38–36	W4
–	June 21	@ White Sox	Postponed (rain); Rescheduled for June 22 as part of a doubleheader.						
75	June 22 (1)	@ White Sox	11–2	**Manaea** (7–6)	Shields (2–9)	—	18,323	39–36	W5
76	June 22 (2)	@ White Sox	4–6	Giolito (5–7)	**Bassitt** (0–3)	Soria (11)	18,323	39–37	L1
77	June 23	@ White Sox	7–6	**Trivino** (5–1)	Minaya (0–2)	**Treinen** (17)	20,457	40–37	W1
78	June 24	@ White Sox	3–10	Rodon (1–2)	**Blackburn** (1–2)	—	21,908	40–38	L1
79	June 25	@ Tigers	5–4	**Trivino** (6–1)	Greene (2–4)	**Treinen** (18)	19,127	41–38	W1
80	June 26	@ Tigers	9–7	**Buchter** (2–0)	Greene (2–5)	**Treinen** (19)	22,809	42–38	W2
81	June 27	@ Tigers	3–0	**Bassitt** (1–3)	Fiers (5–5)	**Trivino** (2)	23,961	43–38	W3
82	June 28	@ Tigers	4–2	**Manaea** (8–6)	Fulmer (3–7)	**Treinen** (20)	28,866	44–38	W4
83	June 29	Indians	3–1	**Blackburn** (2–2)	Bauer (7–6)	**Treinen** (21)	14,823	45–38	W5
84	June 30	Indians	7–2	**Jackson** (1–0)	Plutko (4–2)	**Trivino** (3)	17,748	46–38	W6

July: 17–8 (Home: 6–2; Away: 11–6)

#	Date	Opponent	Score	Win	Loss	Save	Attendance	Record	Streak
85	July 1	Indians	3–15	Clevinger (7–3)	**Montas** (4–2)	—	16,164	46–39	L1
86	July 3	Padres	6–2	**Pagan** (2–0)	Richard (7–8)	—	29,925	47–39	W1
87	July 4	Padres	4–2	**Trivino** (7–1)	Castillo (1–2)	**Treinen** (22)	14,408	48–39	W2
88	July 6	@ Indians	4–10	Carrasco (9–5)	**Blackburn** (2–3)	—	34,633	48–40	L1
89	July 7	@ Indians	6–3 (11)	**Treinen** (5–1)	Tomlin (0–5)	—	33,195	49–40	W1
90	July 8	@ Indians	6–0	**Anderson** (1–2)	Bieber (4–1)	—	27,125	50–40	W2
91	July 9	@ Astros	2–0	**Montas** (5–2)	Peacock (1–4)	**Treinen** (23)	28,301	51–40	W3
92	July 10	@ Astros	5–6 (11)	McHugh (5–0)	**Treinen** (5–2)	—	34,585	51–41	L1
93	July 11	@ Astros	8–3	**Bassitt** (2–3)	McCullers (10–4)	—	41,119	52–41	W1
94	July 12	@ Astros	6–4	**Petit** (3–2)	Devenski (2–2)	**Trivino** (4)	38,900	53–41	W2
95	July 13	@ Giants	1–7	Bumgarner (3–3)	**Jackson** (1–1)	—	41,751	53–42	L1
96	July 14	@ Giants	4–3	**Petit** (4–2)	Watson (2–3)	**Treinen** (24)	41,970	54–42	W1
97	July 15	@ Giants	6–2	**Manaea** (9–6)	Suarez (3–6)	—	42,098	55–42	W2
**89th All-Star Game in Washington, D.C.**
98	July 20	Giants	1–5	Rodríguez (5–1)	**Jackson** (1–2)	—	45,606	55–43	L1
99	July 21	Giants	4–3 (11)	**Petit** (5–2)	Smith (0–1)	—	56,310	56–43	W1
100	July 22	Giants	6–5 (10)	**Familia** (5–4)	Blach (6–6)	—	44,374	57–43	W2
101	July 23	@ Rangers	15–3	**Anderson** (2–2)	Hamels (5–9)	—	18,744	58–43	W3
102	July 24	@ Rangers	13–10 (10)	**Familia** (6–4)	Bibens-Dirkx (2–3)	**Treinen** (25)	18,249	59–43	W4
103	July 25	@ Rangers	6–5	**Trivino** (8–1)	Leclerc (2–3)	**Treinen** (26)	20,549	60–43	W5
104	July 26	@ Rangers	7–6	**Cahill** (2–2)	Colón (5–9)	**Treinen** (27)	20,533	61–43	W6
105	July 27	@ Rockies	1–3	Freeland (9–6)	**Manaea** (9–7)	Ottavino (4)	40,229	61–44	L1
106	July 28	@ Rockies	1–4	Senzatela (4–3)	**Anderson** (2–3)	Davis (29)	47,809	61–45	L2
107	July 29	@ Rockies	2–3	Márquez (9–8)	**Montas** (5–3)	Davis (30)	41,988	61–46	L3
108	July 30	Blue Jays	10–1	**Jackson** (2–2)	Estrada (4–8)	—	11,449	62–46	W1
109	July 31	Blue Jays	6–2	**Cahill** (3–2)	Gaviglio (2–4)	—	17,325	63–46	W2

August: 18–9 (Home: 12–5; Away: 6–4)

#	Date	Opponent	Score	Win	Loss	Save	Attendance	Record	Streak
110	August 1	Blue Jays	8–3	**Manaea** (10–7)	Stroman (4–8)	—	17,058	64–46	W3
111	August 3	Tigers	1–0 (13)	**Pagan** (3–0)	Farmer (4–3)	—	14,766	65–46	W4
112	August 4	Tigers	2–1	**Jackson** (3–2)	Zimmermann (4–4)	**Treinen** (28)	33,668	66–46	W5
113	August 5	Tigers	6–0	**Cahill** (4–2)	Liriano (3–6)	—	19,559	67–46	W6
114	August 7	Dodgers	2–4	Hill (5–4)	**Manaea** (10–8)	Jansen (32)	33,654	67–47	L1
115	August 8	Dodgers	3–2	**Familia** (7–4)	Chargois (2–3)	**Treinen** (29)	32,062	68–47	W1
116	August 10	@ Angels	3–4	Johnson (4–2)	**Trivino** (8–2)	Parker (11)	42,722	68–48	L1
117	August 11	@ Angels	7–0	**Jackson** (4–2)	Skaggs (8–8)	—	39,425	69–48	W1
118	August 12	@ Angels	8–7	**Rodney** (4–2)	Johnson (4–3)	**Treinen** (30)	38,364	70–48	W2
119	August 13	Mariners	7–6	**Manaea** (11–8)	Gonzales (12–8)	**Treinen** (31)	10,400	71–48	W3
120	August 14	Mariners	3–2	**Fiers** (8–6)	Hernández (8–11)	**Treinen** (32)	17,419	72–48	W4
121	August 15	Mariners	0–2 (12)	Pazos (3–1)	**Petit** (5–3)	Díaz (47)	17,078	72–49	L1
122	August 17	Astros	4–3 (10)	**Treinen** (6–2)	Sipp (2–1)	—	23,535	73–49	W1
123	August 18	Astros	7–1	**Cahill** (5–2)	Keuchel (9–10)	—	32,204	74–49	W2
124	August 19	Astros	4–9	Verlander (12–8)	**Manaea** (11–9)	—	29,143	74–50	L1
125	August 20	Rangers	9–0	**Fiers** (9–6)	Colón (7–11)	—	9,341	75–50	W1
126	August 21	Rangers	6–0	**Anderson** (3–3)	Jurado (2–3)	—	11,579	76–50	W2
127	August 22	Rangers	2–4	Minor (10–6)	**Jackson** (4–3)	Leclerc (6)	13,139	76–51	L1
128	August 23	@ Twins	4–6	Busenitz (4–0)	**Cahill** (5–3)	Hildenberger (4)	24,171	76–52	L2
129	August 24	@ Twins	7–1	**Manaea** (12–9)	Odorizzi (5–8)	—	22,568	77–52	W1
130	August 25	@ Twins	6–2	**Fiers** (10–6)	Gonsalves (0–2)	—	28,772	78–52	W2
131	August 26	@ Twins	6–2	**Buchter** (3–0)	Berríos (11–9)	—	23,318	79–52	W3
132	August 27	@ Astros	4–11	Cole (12–5)	**Anderson** (3–4)	—	43,171	79–53	L1
133	August 28	@ Astros	4–3	**Familia** (8–4)	Osuna (1–2)	**Treinen** (33)	33,136	80–53	W1
134	August 29	@ Astros	4–5	Osuna (2–2)	**Familia** (8–5)	—	32,926	80–54	L1
135	August 30	Mariners	1–7	LeBlanc (8–3)	**Montas** (5–4)	—	10,844	80–55	L2
136	August 31	Mariners	7–5	**Petit** (6–3)	Leake (8–9)	**Treinen** (34)	17,942	81–55	W1

September: 16–10 (Home: 10–4; Away: 6–6)

#	Date	Opponent	Score	Win	Loss	Save	Attendance	Record	Streak
137	September 1	Mariners	7–8	Paxton (11–5)	**Hendriks** (0–1)	Díaz (51)	28,760	81–56	L1
138	September 2	Mariners	8–2	**Jackson** (5–3)	Hernández (8–13)	**Treinen** (35)	21,497	82–56	W1
139	September 3	Yankees	6–3	**Cahill** (6–3)	Sabathia (7–6)	**Treinen** (36)	40,546	83–56	W2
140	September 4	Yankees	1–5	Robertson (8–3)	**Rodney** (4–3)	—	17,536	83–57	L1
141	September 5	Yankees	8–2	**Fiers** (11–6)	Severino (17–7)	—	21,004	84–57	W1
142	September 7	Rangers	8–4	**Petit** (7–3)	Gallardo (8–4)	—	15,572	85–57	W2
143	September 8	Rangers	8–6	**Buchter** (4–0)	Martin (1–4)	**Treinen** (37)	20,504	86–57	W3
144	September 9	Rangers	7–3	**Kelley** (2–0)	Jurado (2–5)	—	27,932	87–57	W4
145	September 11	@ Orioles	3–2	**Fiers** (12–6)	Wright (3–2)	**Familia** (18)	9,141	88–57	W5
146	September 12	@ Orioles	10–0	**Mengden** (7–6)	Cashner (4–15)	—	10,480	89–57	W6
147	September 13	@ Orioles	3–5	Bundy (8–14)	**Anderson** (3–5)	Givens (7)	11,714	89–58	L1
148	September 14	@ Rays	2–1 (10)	**Treinen** (7–2)	Schultz (2–1)	—	11,549	90–58	W1
149	September 15	@ Rays	5–7	Kittredge (2–2)	**Familia** (8–6)	Romo (20)	15,154	90–59	L1
150	September 16	@ Rays	4–5	Kittredge (3–2)	**Fiers** (12–7)	Romo (21)	13,197	90–60	L2
151	September 18	Angels	7–9	Ramirez (6–5)	**Trivino** (8–3)	Buttrey (4)	15,031	90–61	L3
152	September 19	Angels	10–0	**Anderson** (4–5)	Peña (3–5)	—	16,425	91–61	W1
153	September 20	Angels	21–3	**Jackson** (6–3)	Shoemaker (2–2)	—	17,217	92–61	W2
154	September 21	Twins	7–6 (10)	**Treinen** (8–2)	Magill (3–3)	—	27,558	93–61	W3
155	September 22	Twins	3–2	**Treinen** (9–2)	Hildenberger (4–5)	—	36,731	94–61	W4
156	September 23	Twins	1–5	Gibson (9–13)	**Cahill** (6–4)	May (1)	35,754	94–62	L1
157	September 24	@ Mariners	7–3	**Buchter** (5–0)	Armstrong (0–1)	—	16,491	95–62	W1
158	September 25	@ Mariners	8–10 (11)	Colomé (7–5)	**Pagan** (3–1)	—	12,791	95–63	L1
159	September 26	@ Mariners	9–3	**Buchter** (6–0)	Hernández (8–14)	—	13,727	96–63	W1
160	September 28	@ Angels	5–8	Cole (4–2)	**Fiers** (12–8)	Robles (2)	35,041	96–64	L1
161	September 29	@ Angels	5–2	**Cahill** (7–4)	Skaggs (8–10)	**Treinen** (38)	43,762	97–64	W1
162	September 30	@ Angels	4–5	Bridwell (3–3)	**Hatcher** (3–3)	—	36,892	97–65	L1

Legend: = Win = Loss = Postponement
Bold = A's team member

== Player stats ==
Note: All team leaders are noted in bold.

Note: * = League leader in category.

=== Batting ===
Note: G = Games played; AB = At bats; R = Runs; H = Hits; 2B = Doubles; 3B = Triples; HR = Home runs; RBI = Runs batted in; SB = Stolen bases; BB = Walks; AVG = Batting average; SLG = Slugging average

Player	G	AB	R	H	2B	3B	HR	RBI	SB	BB	AVG	SLG
Marcus Semien	159	**632**	89	**161**	35	2	15	70	**14**	61	.255	.388
Jed Lowrie	157	596	78	159	37	1	23	99	0	**78**	.267	.448
Matt Olson	**162**	580	85	143	33	0	29	84	2	70	.247	.453
Khris Davis	151	576	98	142	28	1	**48***	**123**	0	59	.247	**.549**
Matt Chapman	145	547	**100**	152	**42**	**6**	24	68	1	58	**.278**	.508
Stephen Piscotty	151	546	78	146	41	0	27	88	2	42	.267	.491
Jonathan Lucroy	126	415	41	100	21	1	4	51	0	29	.241	.325
Mark Canha	122	365	60	91	22	0	17	52	1	34	.249	.449
Chad Pinder	110	298	43	77	12	1	13	27	0	27	.258	.436
Matt Joyce	83	207	34	43	9	0	7	15	0	35	.208	.353
Dustin Fowler	69	192	19	43	3	2	6	23	6	8	.224	.354
Ramón Laureano	48	156	27	45	12	1	5	19	7	16	.288	.474
Nick Martini	55	152	26	45	9	3	1	19	0	21	.296	.414
Josh Phegley	39	93	13	19	7	0	2	15	0	6	.204	.344
Franklin Barreto	32	73	10	17	4	0	5	16	0	1	.233	.493
Bruce Maxwell	18	55	5	10	4	0	1	6	0	2	.182	.309
Jake Smolinski	19	39	2	5	1	1	0	2	1	1	.128	.205
Boog Powell	7	24	3	4	1	1	0	0	1	1	.167	.292
Trayce Thompson	3	7	1	1	0	0	0	0	0	0	.143	.143
Beau Taylor	7	5	0	1	1	0	0	0	0	1	.200	.400
Pitcher totals	162	21	1	3	0	0	0	1	0	0	.143	.143
**Team totals**	**162**	**5579**	**813**	**1407**	**322**	**20**	**227**	**778**	**35**	**550**	**.252**	**.439**

=== Pitching ===
Note: W = Wins; L = Losses; ERA = Earned run average; G = Games pitched; GS = Games started; SV = Saves; IP = Innings pitched; H = Hits allowed; R = Runs allowed; ER = Earned runs allowed; BB = Walks allowed; SO = Strikeouts

Player	W	L	ERA	G	GS	SV	IP	H	R	ER	BB	SO
Sean Manaea	**12**	**9**	3.59‡	27	**27**	0	**160.2**	**141**	**67**	**64**	32	**108**
Daniel Mengden	7	6	4.05	22	17	0	115.2	103	58	52	26	72
Trevor Cahill	7	4	3.76	21	20	0	110.0	90	52	46	**41**	100
Yusmeiro Petit	7	3	3.00	**74**	0	0	93.0	76	32	31	18	76
Edwin Jackson	6	3	3.33	17	17	0	92.0	75	37	34	37	68
Brett Anderson	4	5	4.48	17	17	0	80.0	90	42	40	13	47
Blake Treinen	9	2	0.78	68	0	**38**	80.1	46	12	7	21	100
Lou Trivino	8	3	2.92	69	1	4	74.0	53	24	24	31	82
Frankie Montas	5	4	3.88	13	11	0	65.0	74	34	28	21	43
Emilio Pagán	3	1	4.35	55	0	0	62.0	55	30	30	19	63
Mike Fiers	5	2	3.74	10	9	0	53.0	45	22	22	11	52
Chris Bassitt	2	3	3.02	11	7	0	47.2	40	21	16	19	41
Andrew Triggs	3	1	5.23	9	9	0	41.1	37	24	24	18	43
Ryan Buchter	6	0	2.75	54	0	0	39.1	32	17	12	15	41
Chris Hatcher	3	3	4.95	34	0	0	36.1	43	23	20	17	30
Kendall Graveman	1	5	7.60	7	7	0	34.1	44	32	29	13	27
Jeurys Familia	4	2	3.45	30	0	1	31.1	24	13	12	14	40
Santiago Casilla	0	0	3.16	26	0	1	31.1	18	11	11	20	22
Paul Blackburn	2	3	7.16	6	6	0	27.2	33	23	22	6	19
Ryan Dull	0	0	4.26	28	0	0	25.1	22	12	12	7	21
Daniel Gossett	0	3	5.18	5	5	0	24.1	25	14	14	8	12
Liam Hendriks	0	1	4.13	25	8	0	24.0	25	11	11	10	22
Danny Coulombe	1	1	4.56	27	0	0	23.2	24	13	12	11	26
Fernando Rodney	1	1	3.92	22	0	0	20.2	20	9	9	13	20
J. B. Wendelken	0	0	0.54	13	0	0	16.2	8	1	1	5	14
Shawn Kelley	1	0	2.16	19	0	0	16.2	7	4	4	6	18
Josh Lucas	0	0	6.28	8	1	0	14.1	16	11	10	9	14
Wilmer Font	0	0	14.85	4	0	0	6.2	13	11	11	4	9
Cory Gearrin	0	0	6.00	6	0	0	6.0	10	4	4	2	2
Carlos Ramírez	0	0	3.00	3	0	0	6.0	2	2	2	4	2
Aaron Brooks	0	0	0.00	3	0	0	2.2	1	0	0	2	1
Dean Kiekhefer	0	0	18.00	4	0	0	2.0	7	4	4	1	1
Jake Smolinski	0	0	18.00	1	0	0	1.0	2	2	2	0	0
Jeremy Bleich	0	0	54.00	2	0	0	0.1	2	2	2	0	1
**Team totals**	**97**	**65**	**3.81**	**162**	**162**	**44**	**1465.2**	**1303**	**674**	**621**	**474**	**1237**

Note: ‡ - No ERA qualifiers/leaders noted as no pitcher recorded 162.0 innings or more (1 inning pitched per played game.)

=== American League West ===
AL West
Team	W	L	Pct.	GB	Home	Road
Houston Astros	103	59	.636	—	46‍–‍35	57‍–‍24
Oakland Athletics	97	65	.599	6	50‍–‍31	47‍–‍34
Seattle Mariners	89	73	.549	14	45‍–‍36	44‍–‍37
Los Angeles Angels	80	82	.494	23	42‍–‍39	38‍–‍43
Texas Rangers	67	95	.414	36	34‍–‍47	33‍–‍48

=== American League Wild Card ===
Division leaders
Team	W	L	Pct.
Boston Red Sox	108	54	.667
Houston Astros	103	59	.636
Cleveland Indians	91	71	.562

Wild Card teams (Top 2 teams qualify for postseason)
Team	W	L	Pct.	GB
New York Yankees	100	62	.617	+3
Oakland Athletics	97	65	.599	—
Tampa Bay Rays	90	72	.556	7
Seattle Mariners	89	73	.549	8
Los Angeles Angels	80	82	.494	17
Minnesota Twins	78	84	.481	19
Toronto Blue Jays	73	89	.451	24
Texas Rangers	67	95	.414	30
Detroit Tigers	64	98	.395	33
Chicago White Sox	62	100	.383	35
Kansas City Royals	58	104	.358	39
Baltimore Orioles	47	115	.290	50

=== Record against opponents ===
2018 American League record Source: MLB Standings Grid – 2018
Team	BAL	BOS	CWS	CLE	DET	HOU	KC	LAA	MIN	NYY	OAK	SEA	TB	TEX	TOR	NL
Baltimore	—	3–16	3–4	2–5	2–4	1–6	2–4	1–5	1–6	7–12	1–5	1–6	8–11	3–4	5–14	7–13
Boston	16–3	—	3–4	3–4	4–2	3–4	5–1	6–0	4–3	10–9	2–4	4–3	11–8	6–1	15–4	16–4
Chicago	4–3	4–3	—	5–14	7–12	0–7	11–8	2–5	7–12	2–4	2–5	2–4	4–2	4–3	2–4	6–14
Cleveland	5–2	4–3	14–5	—	13–6	3–4	12–7	3–3	10–9	2–5	2–4	2–5	2–4	4–2	3–4	12–8
Detroit	4–2	2–4	12–7	6–13	—	1–5	8–11	3–4	7–12	3–4	0–7	3–4	2–4	3–4	4–3	6–14
Houston	6–1	4–3	7–0	4–3	5–1	—	5–1	13–6	4–2	2–5	12–7	9–10	3–4	12–7	4–2	13–7
Kansas City	4–2	1–5	8–11	7–12	11–8	1–5	—	1–6	10–9	2–5	2–5	1–5	0–7	2–5	2–5	6–14
Los Angeles	5–1	0–6	5–2	3–3	4–3	6–13	6–1	—	4–3	1–5	10–9	8–11	1–6	13–6	4–3	10–10
Minnesota	6–1	3–4	12–7	9–10	12–7	2–4	9–10	3–4	—	2–5	2–5	1–5	3–4	2–4	4–2	8–12
New York	12–7	9–10	4–2	5–2	4–3	5–2	5–2	5–1	5–2	—	3–3	5–1	10–9	4–3	13–6	11–9
Oakland	5–1	4–2	5–2	4–2	7–0	7–12	5–2	9–10	5–2	3–3	—	9–10	2–5	13–6	7–0	12–8
Seattle	6–1	3–4	4–2	5–2	4–3	10–9	5–1	11–8	5–1	1–5	10–9	—	6–1	10–9	3–4	6–14
Tampa Bay	11–8	8–11	2–4	4–2	4–2	4–3	7–0	6–1	4–3	9–10	5–2	1–6	—	5–1	13–6	7–13
Texas	4–3	1–6	3–4	2–4	4–3	7–12	5–2	6–13	4–2	3–4	6–13	9–10	1–5	—	3–3	9–11
Toronto	14–5	4–15	4–2	4–3	3–4	2–4	5–2	3–4	2–4	6–13	0–7	4–3	6–13	3–3	—	13–7

== Postseason ==
=== Postseason game log ===
2018 Postseason game log (0−1 (Home 0−0; Away 0−1))
American League Wild Card Game: 0−1

#	Date	Opponent	Stadium	Score	Win	Loss	Save	Attendance	Record
1	October 3	@ Yankees	Yankee Stadium	2-7	Betances (1−0)	Hendriks (0−1)	-	49,620	0–1

=== Postseason rosters ===
Playoff rosters
American League Wild Card Game

- Pitchers: 15 Emilio Pagán 16 Liam Hendriks 31 Shawn Kelley 32 Jeurys Familia 36 Yusmeiro Petit 37 Edwin Jackson 39 Blake Treinen 52 Ryan Buchter 56 Fernando Rodney 57 J. B. Wendelken 62 Lou Trivino
- Catchers: 19 Josh Phegley 21 Jonathan Lucroy
- Infielders: 1 Franklin Barreto 8 Jed Lowrie 10 Marcus Semien 18 Chad Pinder 26 Matt Chapman 28 Matt Olson
- Outfielders: 20 Mark Canha 22 Ramón Laureano 23 Matt Joyce 25 Stephen Piscotty 38 Nick Martini
- Designated hitters: 2 Khris Davis

== Roster ==
2018 Oakland Athletics
Roster
Pitchers: 30 Brett Anderson; 40 Chris Bassitt; 58 Paul Blackburn; 56 Jeremy Bleich; 35 Aaron Brooks; 52 Ryan Buchter; 53 Trevor Cahill; 46 Santiago Casilla; 35 Daniel Coulombe; 66 Ryan Dull; 32 Jeurys Familia; 50 Mike Fiers; 57 Wilmer Font; 61 Cory Gearrin; 48 Daniel Gossett; 49 Kendall Graveman; 44 Chris Hatcher; 31,16 Liam Hendriks; 37 Edwin Jackson; 31 Shawn Kelley; 63 Dean Kiekhefer; 54 Josh Lucas; 55 Sean Manaea; 33 Daniel Mengden; 47 Frankie Montas; 15 Emilio Pagan; 36 Yusmeiro Petit; 61 Carlos Ramírez; 56 Fernando Rodney; 39 Blake Treinen; 60 Andrew Triggs; 62 Lou Trivino; 57 J. B. Wendelken	Catchers: 21 Jonathan Lucroy; 13 Bruce Maxwell; 19 Josh Phegley; 46 Beau Taylor; Infielders: 1 Franklin Barreto; 26 Matt Chapman; 8 Jed Lowrie; 28 Matt Olson; 10 Marcus Semien	Outfielders: 20 Mark Canha; 2 Khris Davis; 11 Dustin Fowler; 23 Matthew Joyce; 22 Ramón Laureano; 38 Nick Martini; 18 Chad Pinder; 25 Stephen Piscotty; 3 Boog Powell; 5 Jake Smolinski; 32 Trayce Thompson	Manager: 6 Bob Melvin; Coaches: 17 Mike Aldrete (assistant hitting); 51 Darren Bush (hitting); 29 Ryan Christenson (bench); 90 Jeremy Dowdy (bullpen catcher); 14 Scott Emerson (pitching); 59 Marcus Jensen (bullpen/catching); 7 Mark Kotsay (quality control); 41 Al Pedrique (first base); 88 Philip Pohl (bullpen catcher); 4 Matt Williams (third base)

== Farm system ==
Level	Team	League	Manager
AAA	Nashville Sounds	Pacific Coast League	Fran Riordan
AA	Midland RockHounds	Texas League	Scott Steinmann
A-Advanced	Stockton Ports	California League	Rick Magnante
A	Beloit Snappers	Midwest League	Webster Garrison
A-Short Season	Vermont Lake Monsters	New York–Penn League	Aaron Nieckula
Rookie	AZL Athletics	Arizona League	Eddie Menchaca
Rookie	DSL Athletics	Dominican Summer League	Carlos Casimiro
