= 2018 New York Yankees season =

Season for the Major League Baseball team the New York Yankees

2018 New York Yankees
- American League Wild Card winners
- League: American League
- Division: East
- Ballpark: Yankee Stadium
- City: New York
- Record: 100–62 (.617)
- Divisional place: 2nd
- Owners: Yankee Global Enterprises
- General managers: Brian Cashman
- Managers: Aaron Boone
- Television: YES Network; PIX 11 (Michael Kay, Ryan Ruocco, Paul O'Neill, David Cone, several others as analysts)
- Radio: WFAN SportsRadio 66 AM / 101.9 FM; New York Yankees Radio Network (John Sterling, Suzyn Waldman)

The 2018 New York Yankees season was the 116th season for the New York Yankees franchise in Major League Baseball.

This was the team's first season since 2007 without manager Joe Girardi, and its first season under manager Aaron Boone. The Yankees finished the regular season with a record of 100–62, earning the first of the two American League wild card postseason spots. They defeated the Oakland Athletics in the Wild Card Game by a score of 7–2 before losing to the Boston Red Sox in four games in the Division Series.

== Offseason ==
After the 2017 season, the Yankees decided not to retain Joe Girardi as their manager. The Yankees hired former player Aaron Boone to succeed him on December 4, 2017.

=== Transactions ===
On December 9, 2017, the Yankees traded All-star second baseman Starlin Castro and two minor league prospects to the Miami Marlins for reigning NL MVP Giancarlo Stanton. The deal was made official December 11. After the deal was announced, General Manager Brian Cashman received a contract extension for 5 years, reportedly worth $25 million.

On December 12, 2017, the first day of the MLB Winter Meetings, the Yankees traded Chase Headley and Bryan Mitchell to the San Diego Padres for Jabari Blash. This will be Headley's second stint with the Padres.

On February 20, 2018, the Yankees acquired infielder Brandon Drury from the Arizona Diamondbacks in a three team trade along with the Tampa Bay Rays. As part of the deal, the Yankees sent prospect Nick Solak to the Rays and Arizona received prospect Taylor Widener along with Steven Souza Jr. from Tampa Bay. To make room for Drury on the 40-man roster, the Yankees traded Blash to the Los Angeles Angels for a PTBNL or cash considerations.

On March 12, 2018, the Yankees signed second baseman Neil Walker to a 1-year, $4 million contract.

== Spring training ==
The Yankees finished their spring training in 4th place in the Grapefruit league with an 18–13 record, a .581 winning percentage.

== Regular season ==
=== March ===
The Yankees began the regular season on March 29, 2018, with a 6–1 win over the Toronto Blue Jays at Rogers Centre in Toronto, Canada. They ended up going 2–1 in the first 3 games of the season.

=== April ===
On April 20, following their loss to the Toronto Blue Jays, they had a record of 9–9, and were in third place in the American League East, seven games behind the first place Boston Red Sox. They would follow this by winning 17 out of their next 18 games which would, at 26–10, give them the best record in all of MLB. They finished the month going 16–9.

==== Yankees–Red Sox brawl ====
On April 11, 2018, the Yankee-Red Sox rivalry heated up at Fenway Park when the Yankees and the Boston Red Sox game broke out into a brawl.

With the Yankees leading 10–6 in the 7th inning, Yankees first basemen Tyler Austin got hit by a pitch thrown by reliever Joe Kelly. Austin was drilled with a 98 MPH fastball, possibly in retaliation after Austin slid foot-first into Red Sox shortstop Brock Holt in the 3rd inning, striking his leg and breaking up a double play. Holt questioned the slide and Austin briefly got in his face before the second base umpire David Rackley intervened. The benches emptied but it turned into a harmless stare down. The play was under review and was deemed a "bona fide slide" and did not break up the double play.

Austin charged the mound and both teams benches and bullpens cleared with both Aaron Judge and Giancarlo Stanton helping to protect their teammates, as well as conducting damage control with Red Sox players.

When the altercation settled down, Yankees third base coach Phil Nevin, who was "jawing" towards the Red Sox dugout, and Austin were ejected, along with Kelly. Also Yankees reliever Tommy Kahnle was tossed because he was "incensed" after he was pushed by an umpire in the scuffle.

Discipline actions were set the next day: Kelly was fined and suspended for 6 games; Austin was fined and suspended for 5 games; while Nevin and Red Sox manager Alex Cora were issued undisclosed fines. Players on the Disabled List were also fined for entering the field during the skirmish: Yankees pitcher C.C. Sabathia and Red Sox infielders Xander Bogaerts, Marco Hernández, and Dustin Pedroia.

=== May ===
The Yankees started the month winning against the Houston Astros 4–0 on a go-ahead 3-run home run by Gary Sanchez. They took over first place from the Boston Red Sox on May 9 by winning against them, 9–6. They finished the month going 17–7, putting them with a season record of 35–17. Even so, this set them back to second place in the division, 1 1/2 games behind the Red Sox (39–18).

=== June ===
The Yankees started the month with a 4–1 victory over the Baltimore Orioles. They finished the series with baseball's best record (37–17), even though they were still one game behind the Boston Red Sox (41–19) for the division lead. This happened several more times throughout the month. On June 21, the Yankees made franchise history with a win over the Seattle Mariners, making it their 50th win on the season in just their 72nd game. In previous seasons, they reached that feat eight times (7 out of 8 they made it to the World Series). The Yankees finished the month losing 11–0 against the Red Sox. They went 18–9 for the month, putting their record at 53–27, one game back of the Red Sox (56–28).

=== July ===
The Yankees started the month by blowing out the Red Sox 11–1, putting them back into a tie for first place in the division. They hit 6 home runs in the game (Aaron Judge started it off with a solo shot, Gleyber Torres had a three-run blast, Aaron Hicks hit 3, and Kyle Higashioka had one for his first MLB hit), setting the team record for the most home runs hit by a team before the All-Star break with 137. The Yankees sent four players to the All-Star Game in Washington, D.C. Judge and Luis Severino played, while Torres and Aroldis Chapman sat out due to injuries. Before the Trade Deadline, the team acquired J. A. Happ from the Blue Jays, Zach Britton from the Orioles, Lance Lynn from the Twins, and Luke Voit from the Cardinals. The Yankees finished the month winning against the Orioles 6–3, going 15–10 for the month and 68–37 overall. This, however, pushed them 5 games back of the Red Sox, who continue to own the best record in baseball at 75–35.

=== August ===
The Yankees started the month losing to the Orioles 7–5 in the series finale. They traveled to Fenway Park to face the Boston Red Sox and tried to get closer to first place in the division. However they lost in a four-game sweep to their division rivals. The Yankees snapped their five-game losing streak (their longest of the season) with a 7–0 shoutout win over the Chicago White Sox, sweeping them in three games. At home, they then took three out of four from the Texas Rangers and lost the one-game matchup against the New York Mets 8–5, that was postponed previously due to inclement weather. The Yankees played the Baltimore Orioles in a four-game series spread out over three days, which saw the Yankees sweep the series and coming back to 6 games behind the Red Sox. The month ended with the Yankees winning against the Detroit Tigers 7–5, putting them (85–50) 8 games back of the Red Sox (93–42).

=== September ===
The Yankees started the month winning 2–1 against the Detroit Tigers. Masahiro Tanaka completed back-to-back outings of 7 or more innings for the first time since September 2, 2017. The Boston Red Sox clinched the AL East title by winning against the Yankees 11–6 on September 20. However, the Yankees clinched an AL Wild Card spot two days later by winning against the Baltimore Orioles 3–2 in 11 innings. This will be the Yankees third postseason appearance in five years, all of which will begin with the Wild Card Game. On September 28, with a win over the Boston Red Sox, the Yankees clinched home field advantage and will face the Oakland Athletics in the AL Wild Card Game. The next day, with a 4th inning two-run home run by Gleyber Torres, the Yankees broke single season home run record set by the 1997 Seattle Mariners with 265 home runs (a game later 267). Also, the Yankees became the first team in MLB history to have at least 20 home runs from every spot in the batting order. As well as sharing history with the Red Sox. For the first season in MLB history both teams reached 100 wins.

=== October ===
The Yankees began the postseason by defeating the Athletics in the 2018 American League Wild Card Game 7–2. They moved on to face the Boston Red Sox in the ALDS. This was the first time since the 2004 American League Championship Series that the two teams faced each other in the postseason. They fell short in 4 games, as Boston defeated the Yankees 3 games to 1. This marks the first time in franchise history that they would lose in the postseason as a Wild Card team in back-to-back seasons.

== Season standings ==
=== American League East ===
AL East
Team	W	L	Pct.	GB	Home	Road
Boston Red Sox	108	54	.667	—	57‍–‍24	51‍–‍30
New York Yankees	100	62	.617	8	53‍–‍28	47‍–‍34
Tampa Bay Rays	90	72	.556	18	51‍–‍30	39‍–‍42
Toronto Blue Jays	73	89	.451	35	40‍–‍41	33‍–‍48
Baltimore Orioles	47	115	.290	61	28‍–‍53	19‍–‍62

=== American League Wild Card ===
Division leaders
Team	W	L	Pct.
Boston Red Sox	108	54	.667
Houston Astros	103	59	.636
Cleveland Indians	91	71	.562

Wild Card teams (Top 2 teams qualify for postseason)
Team	W	L	Pct.	GB
New York Yankees	100	62	.617	+3
Oakland Athletics	97	65	.599	—
Tampa Bay Rays	90	72	.556	7
Seattle Mariners	89	73	.549	8
Los Angeles Angels	80	82	.494	17
Minnesota Twins	78	84	.481	19
Toronto Blue Jays	73	89	.451	24
Texas Rangers	67	95	.414	30
Detroit Tigers	64	98	.395	33
Chicago White Sox	62	100	.383	35
Kansas City Royals	58	104	.358	39
Baltimore Orioles	47	115	.290	50

=== Record against opponents ===
2018 American League record Source: MLB Standings Grid – 2018
Team	BAL	BOS	CWS	CLE	DET	HOU	KC	LAA	MIN	NYY	OAK	SEA	TB	TEX	TOR	NL
Baltimore	—	3–16	3–4	2–5	2–4	1–6	2–4	1–5	1–6	7–12	1–5	1–6	8–11	3–4	5–14	7–13
Boston	16–3	—	3–4	3–4	4–2	3–4	5–1	6–0	4–3	10–9	2–4	4–3	11–8	6–1	15–4	16–4
Chicago	4–3	4–3	—	5–14	7–12	0–7	11–8	2–5	7–12	2–4	2–5	2–4	4–2	4–3	2–4	6–14
Cleveland	5–2	4–3	14–5	—	13–6	3–4	12–7	3–3	10–9	2–5	2–4	2–5	2–4	4–2	3–4	12–8
Detroit	4–2	2–4	12–7	6–13	—	1–5	8–11	3–4	7–12	3–4	0–7	3–4	2–4	3–4	4–3	6–14
Houston	6–1	4–3	7–0	4–3	5–1	—	5–1	13–6	4–2	2–5	12–7	9–10	3–4	12–7	4–2	13–7
Kansas City	4–2	1–5	8–11	7–12	11–8	1–5	—	1–6	10–9	2–5	2–5	1–5	0–7	2–5	2–5	6–14
Los Angeles	5–1	0–6	5–2	3–3	4–3	6–13	6–1	—	4–3	1–5	10–9	8–11	1–6	13–6	4–3	10–10
Minnesota	6–1	3–4	12–7	9–10	12–7	2–4	9–10	3–4	—	2–5	2–5	1–5	3–4	2–4	4–2	8–12
New York	12–7	9–10	4–2	5–2	4–3	5–2	5–2	5–1	5–2	—	3–3	5–1	10–9	4–3	13–6	11–9
Oakland	5–1	4–2	5–2	4–2	7–0	7–12	5–2	9–10	5–2	3–3	—	9–10	2–5	13–6	7–0	12–8
Seattle	6–1	3–4	4–2	5–2	4–3	10–9	5–1	11–8	5–1	1–5	10–9	—	6–1	10–9	3–4	6–14
Tampa Bay	11–8	8–11	2–4	4–2	4–2	4–3	7–0	6–1	4–3	9–10	5–2	1–6	—	5–1	13–6	7–13
Texas	4–3	1–6	3–4	2–4	4–3	7–12	5–2	6–13	4–2	3–4	6–13	9–10	1–5	—	3–3	9–11
Toronto	14–5	4–15	4–2	4–3	3–4	2–4	5–2	3–4	2–4	6–13	0–7	4–3	6–13	3–3	—	13–7

== Detailed records ==
American League
Opponent	Home	Away	Total	Pct.
AL East
Baltimore Orioles	4–5	8–2	12–7	.632
Boston Red Sox	6-3	3-7	9-10	.474
New York Yankees	-	-	-	
Toronto Blue Jays	7-3	6-3	13-6	.684
Tampa Bay Rays	6-3	4-6	10-9	.526
	23-14	21-18	44-32	.579
AL Central
Detroit Tigers	2-2	2-1	4-3	.571
Cleveland Indians	3-0	2-2	5-2	.714
Kansas City Royals	3-1	2-1	5-2	.714
Minnesota Twins	4-0	1-2	5-2	.714
Chicago White Sox	1-2	3-0	4-2	.667
	13–5	10–6	23–11	.676
AL West
Oakland Athletics	2–1	1–2	3–3	.500
Houston Astros	2-1	3–1	5–2	.714
Los Angeles Angels	2-1	3–0	5–1	.833
Seattle Mariners	3–0	2–1	5–1	.833
Texas Rangers	3–1	1–2	4–3	.571
	12–4	10–6	22–10	.688

National League
Opponent	Home	Away	Total	Pct.
Washington Nationals	1-1	1–1	2–2	.500
New York Mets	1–2	2–1	3–3	.500
Atlanta Braves	2–1	—	2–1	.667
Philadelphia Phillies	-	2–1	2–1	.667
Miami Marlins	1–1	1–1	2–2	.500
	5–5	6–4	11–9	.550

== Roster ==
2018 New York Yankees
Roster
Pitchers: 43 Chance Adams; 68 Dellin Betances; 53 Zach Britton; 85 Luis Cessa; 54 Aroldis Chapman; 67 A. J. Cole; 61 Giovanny Gallegos; 65 Domingo Germán; 55 Sonny Gray; 57 Chad Green; 61 David Hale; 34 J. A. Happ; 56 Jonathan Holder; 48 Tommy Kahnle; 70 George Kontos; 38 Jonathan Loáisiga; 36 Lance Lynn; 47 Jordan Montgomery; 30 David Robertson; 52 CC Sabathia; 40 Luis Severino; 61 Justus Sheffield; 45 Chasen Shreve; 19 Masahiro Tanaka; 71 Stephen Tarpley; 43 Adam Warren	Catchers: 66 Kyle Higashioka; 28 Austin Romine; 24 Gary Sánchez; Infielders: 41 Miguel Andújar; 26 Tyler Austin; 33 Greg Bird; 29 Brandon Drury; 18 Didi Gregorius; 29 Adeiny Hechavarria; 25 Gleyber Torres; 74 Ronald Torreyes; 45 Luke Voit; 12 Tyler Wade; 14 Neil Walker	Outfielders: 77 Clint Frazier; 11 Brett Gardner; 31 Aaron Hicks; 99 Aaron Judge; 26 Andrew McCutchen; 39 Billy McKinney; 34 Jace Peterson; 25,38 Shane Robinson; 27 Giancarlo Stanton	Manager: 17 Aaron Boone; Coaches: 59 Josh Bard (bench); -- Jason Brown (catching); -- Radley Haddad (bullpen catcher); 60 Mike Harkey (bullpen); 64 Carlos Mendoza (quality control/infield); 35 Phil Nevin (third base); 63 P. J. Pilittere (asst. hitting); 58 Larry Rothschild (pitching); 62 Marcus Thames (hitting); 50 Reggie Willits (first base/outfield)

== Game log ==
Legend
	Yankees win
	Yankees loss
	Postponement
**Bold**	Yankees team member

2018 game log: 100–62 (Home: 53–28; Away: 47–34)
March: 2–1 (Home: 0–0; Away: 2–1)

#	Date	Opponent	Score	Win	Loss	Save	Stadium	Attendance	Record
1	March 29	@ Blue Jays	6–1	**Severino** (1–0)	Happ (0–1)	—	Rogers Centre	48,115	1–0
2	March 30	@ Blue Jays	4–2	**Tanaka** (1–0)	Sanchez (0–1)	**Chapman** (1)	Rogers Centre	33,716	2–0
3	March 31	@ Blue Jays	3–5	Tepera (1–0)	**Betances** (0–1)	Osuna (1)	Rogers Centre	37,692	2–1

April: 16–9 (Home: 11–5; Away: 5–4)

#	Date	Opponent	Score	Win	Loss	Save	Stadium	Attendance	Record
4	April 1	@ Blue Jays	4–7	Clippard (1–0)	**Robertson** (0–1)	Oh (1)	Rogers Centre	29,091	2–2
—	April 2	Rays	Postponed (inclement weather: snow). Makeup date: April 3						
5	April 3	Rays	11–4	**Kahnle** (1–0)	Pruitt (1–1)	—	**Yankee Stadium**	46,776	3–2
6	April 4	Rays	7–2	**Severino** (2–0)	Snell (0–1)	—	**Yankee Stadium**	40,028	4–2
7	April 5	Orioles	2—5	Cashner (1–1)	**Tanaka** (1–1)	Brach (1)	**Yankee Stadium**	33,653	4–3
8	April 6	Orioles	3–7	Araujo (1–0)	**Holder** (0–1)	—	**Yankee Stadium**	34,244	4–4
9	April 7	Orioles	8–3	**Gray** (1–0)	Tillman (0–2)	—	**Yankee Stadium**	34,388	5–4
10	April 8	Orioles	7–8 (12)	Bleier (2–0)	**Warren** (0–1)	Brach (2)	**Yankee Stadium**	37,096	5–5
11	April 10	@ Red Sox	1–14	Sale (1–0)	**Severino** (2–1)	–	Fenway Park	32,357	5–6
12	April 11	@ Red Sox	10–7	**Tanaka** (2–1)	Price (1–1)	—	Fenway Park	32,400	6–6
13	April 12	@ Red Sox	3–6	Porcello (3–0)	**Gray** (1–1)	Kimbrel (4)	Fenway Park	36,341	6–7
14	April 13	@ Tigers	8–6	**Montgomery** (1–0)	Fiers (1–1)	**Chapman** (2)	Comerica Park	21,363	7–7
—	April 14	@ Tigers	Postponed (inclement weather). Makeup date: June 4, double header						
—	April 15	@ Tigers	Postponed (inclement weather). Makeup date: June 4, double header						
15	April 16	Marlins	12–1	**Severino** (3–1)	Smith (0–2)	—	**Yankee Stadium**	32,525	8–7
16	April 17	Marlins	1–9	Gracía (1–0)	**Tanaka** (2–2)	—	**Yankee Stadium**	34,005	8–8
17	April 19	Blue Jays	4–3	**Green** (1–0)	Sanchez (1–2)	**Chapman** (3)	**Yankee Stadium**	36,665	9–8
18	April 20	Blue Jays	5–8	Estrada (2–1)	**Germán** (0–1)	Osuna (6)	**Yankee Stadium**	39,197	9–9
19	April 21	Blue Jays	9–1	**Montgomery** (2–0)	Stroman (0–2)	—	**Yankee Stadium**	40,986	10–9
20	April 22	Blue Jays	5–1	**Severino** (4–1)	García (2–1)	—	**Yankee Stadium**	43,628	11–9
21	April 23	Twins	14–1	**Tanaka** (3–2)	Odorizzi (1–2)	—	**Yankee Stadium**	39,249	12–9
22	April 24	Twins	8–3	**Sabathia** (1–0)	Berríos (2–2)	—	**Yankee Stadium**	39,025	13–9
23	April 25	Twins	7–4	**Green** (2–0)	Lynn (0–2)	**Chapman** (4)	**Yankee Stadium**	39,243	14–9
24	April 26	Twins	4–3	**Betances** (1-1)	Rodney (1–2)	—	**Yankee Stadium**	40,758	15–9
25	April 27	@ Angels	4–3	**Robertson** (1–1)	Parker (0–1)	**Chapman** (5)	Angel Stadium	40,416	16–9
26	April 28	@ Angels	11–1	**Tanaka** (4–2)	Richards (3–1)	—	Angel Stadium	44,649	17–9
27	April 29	@ Angels	2–1	**Sabathia** (2–0)	Skaggs (3–2)	**Chapman** (6)	Angel Stadium	44,593	18–9
28	April 30	@ Astros	1–2	Morton (4–0)	**Gray** (1–2)	Giles (3)	Minute Maid Park	30,061	18–10

May: 17–8 (Home: 11–4; Away: 6–4)

#	Date	Opponent	Score	Win	Loss	Save	Stadium	Attendance	Record
29	May 1	@ Astros	4–0	**Robertson** (2–1)	Giles (0–1)	—	Minute Maid Park	34,386	19–10
30	May 2	@ Astros	4–0	**Severino** (5–1)	Keuchel (1–5)	—	Minute Maid Park	31,617	20–10
31	May 3	@ Astros	6–5	**Shreve** (1–0)	Harris (1–2)	**Chapman** (7)	Minute Maid Park	34,838	21–10
32	May 4	Indians	7–6	**Chapman** (1–0)	Ogando (0–1)	—	**Yankee Stadium**	46,869	22–10
33	May 5	Indians	5–2	**Gray** (2–2)	Bauer (2–3)	**Robertson** (1)	**Yankee Stadium**	43,075	23–10
34	May 6	Indians	7–4	**Shreve** (2–0)	Allen (2–1)	—	**Yankee Stadium**	40,107	24–10
35	May 8	Red Sox	3–2	**Robertson** (3–1)	Hembree (2–1)	**Chapman** (8)	**Yankee Stadium**	45,773	25–10
36	May 9	Red Sox	9–6	**Holder** (1–1)	Barnes (0–1)	**Chapman** (9)	**Yankee Stadium**	47,008	26–10
37	May 10	Red Sox	4–5	Kelly (2–0)	**Betances** (1–2)	Kimbrel (10)	**Yankee Stadium**	46,899	26–11
38	May 11	Athletics	5–10	Graveman (1–5)	**Gray** (2–3)	Treinen (6)	**Yankee Stadium**	43,093	26–12
39	May 12	Athletics	7–6 (11)	**Cole** (2–1)	Hatcher (3–1)	—	**Yankee Stadium**	41,859	27–12
40	May 13	Athletics	6–2	**Severino** (6–1)	Anderson (0–2)	—	**Yankee Stadium**	40,538	28–12
41	May 15	@ Nationals	3–5	Suero (1–0)	**Green** (4–1)	Doolittle (18)	Nationals Park	41,567	28–13
42	May 18	@ Royals	2-5	Junis (5–3)	**Sabathia** (2–1)	Herrera (9)	Kauffman Stadium	26,433	28–14
43	May 19	@ Royals	8–3	**Severino** (7–1)	Duffy (1–6)	—	Kauffman Stadium	33,684	29–14
44	May 20	@ Royals	10–1	**Gray** (3–3)	Skoglund (1–4)	—	Kauffman Stadium	24,121	30–14
45	May 21	@ Rangers	10–5	**Tanaka** (5–2)	Colón (2–2)	—	Globe Life Park	29,553	31–14
46	May 22	@ Rangers	4–6	Hamels (3–4)	**Germán** (0–2)	Kela (9)	Globe Life Park	30,325	31–15
47	May 23	@ Rangers	10–12	Claudio (2–2)	**Robertson** (3–2)	Kela (10)	Globe Life Park	31,304	31–16
48	May 25	Angels	2–1	**Green** (3–0)	Johnson (2–2)	**Chapman** (10)	**Yankee Stadium**	46,056	32–16
49	May 26	Angels	4–11	Barria (4–1)	**Gray** (3–4)	—	**Yankee Stadium**	44,565	32–17
50	May 27	Angels	3–1	**Tanaka** (6–2)	Richards (4–4)	**Chapman** (11)	**Yankee Stadium**	46,109	33–17
51	May 28	Astros	1–5	Verlander (7–2)	**Germán** (0–3)	—	**Yankee Stadium**	46,583	33–18
52	May 29	Astros	6–5 (10)	**Chapman** (2–0)	Peacock (1–3)	—	**Yankee Stadium**	45,458	34–18
53	May 30	Astros	5–3	**Severino** (8–1)	Keuchel (3–7)	**Chapman** (12)	**Yankee Stadium**	45,229	35–18
—	May 31	@ Orioles	Postponed (inclement weather). Makeup date: July 9, double header						

June: 18–9 (Home: 8–3; Away: 10–6)

#	Date	Opponent	Score	Win	Loss	Save	Stadium	Attendance	Record
54	June 1	@ Orioles	4–1	**Gray** (4–4)	Cashner (2–7)	**Chapman** (13)	Oriole Park at Camden Yards	26,500	36–18
55	June 2	@ Orioles	8–5	**Tanaka** (7–2)	Gausman (3–5)	—	Oriole Park at Camden Yards	32,823	37–18
—	June 3	@ Orioles	Postponed (inclement weather). Makeup date: August 25, double header						
56	June 4	@ Tigers	7–4	**Severino** (9–1)	VerHagen (0–2)	**Chapman** (14)	Comerica Park	28,016	38–18
57	June 4	@ Tigers	2–4	Fiers (5–3)	**Germán** (0–4)	Greene (15)	Comerica Park	24,165	38–19
58	June 5	@ Blue Jays	7–2	**Sabathia** (3–1)	Oh (1–2)	—	Rogers Centre	29,308	39–19
59	June 6	@ Blue Jays	3–0 (13)	**Robertson** (4–2)	Biagini (0–5)	**Chapman** (15)	Rogers Centre	27,838	40–19
60	June 8	@ Mets	4–1	**Green** (4–0)	deGrom (4–1)	**Chapman** (16)	Citi Field	42,961	41–19
61	June 9	@ Mets	4–3	**Robertson** (5–2)	Swarzak (0–1)	**Chapman** (17)	Citi Field	43,603	42–19
62	June 10	@ Mets	0–2	Lugo (2–1)	**Severino** (9–2)	Swarzak (1)	Citi Field	36,171	42–20
63	June 12	Nationals	3–0	**Sabathia** (4–1)	Roark (3–7)	**Chapman** (18)	**Yankee Stadium**	44,220	43–20
64	June 13	Nationals	4–5	Miller (4–0)	**Shreve** (2–1)	Doolittle (17)	**Yankee Stadium**	45,030	43–21
65	June 14	Rays	4–3	**Germán** (1–4)	Snell (8–4)	**Chapman** (19)	**Yankee Stadium**	45,066	44–21
66	June 15	Rays	5–0	**Loáisiga** (1–0)	Eovaldi (1–2)	—	**Yankee Stadium**	45,112	45–21
67	June 16	Rays	4–1	**Severino** (10–2)	Yarbrough (5–3)	**Chapman** (20)	**Yankee Stadium**	46,249	46–21
68	June 17	Rays	1–3	Roe (1–1)	**Sabathia** (4–2)	Romo (3)	**Yankee Stadium**	46,400	46–22
69	June 18	@ Nationals	4–2	**Gray** (5–4)	Fedde (0–2)	**Chapman** (21)	Nationals Park	42,723	47–22
70	June 19	Mariners	7–2	**Germán** (2–4)	Gonzales (7–4)	—	**Yankee Stadium**	45,122	48–22
71	June 20	Mariners	7–5	**Chapman** (3–0)	Cook (1–1)	—	**Yankee Stadium**	46,047	49–22
72	June 21	Mariners	4–3	**Severino** (11–2)	Paxton (6–2)	**Chapman** (22)	**Yankee Stadium**	46,658	50–22
73	June 22	@ Rays	1–2	Yarbrough (6–3)	**Sabathia** (4–3)	Romo (5)	Tropicana Field	27,252	50–23
74	June 23	@ Rays	0–4	Font (1–3)	**Gray** (5–5)	—	Tropicana Field	29,831	50–24
75	June 24	@ Rays	6–7 (12)	Yarbrough (7–3)	**Shreve** (2–2)	—	Tropicana Field	23,667	50–25
76	June 25	@ Phillies	4–2	**Loáisiga** (2–0)	Velasquez (5–8)	**Chapman** (23)	Citizens Bank Park	44,136	51–25
77	June 26	@ Phillies	6–0	**Severino** (12–2)	Arrieta (5–6)	—	Citizens Bank Park	43,568	52–25
78	June 27	@ Phillies	0–3	Eflin (6–2)	**Cessa** (0–1)	Domínguez (5)	Citizens Bank Park	42,028	52–26
79	June 29	Red Sox	8–1	**Sabathia** (5–3)	Rodriguez (9–3)	—	**Yankee Stadium**	47,120	53–26
80	June 30	Red Sox	0–11	Sale (8–4)	**Gray** (5–6)	—	**Yankee Stadium**	47,125	53–27

July: 15–10 (Home: 8–3; Away: 7–7)

#	Date	Opponent	Score	Win	Loss	Save	Stadium	Attendance	Record
81	July 1	Red Sox	11–1	**Severino** (13–2)	Price (9–6)	—	**Yankee Stadium**	46,795	54–27
82	July 2	Braves	3–5 (11)	Biddle (2–0)	**Robertson** (5–3)	Minter (4)	**Yankee Stadium**	43,792	54–28
83	July 3	Braves	8–5	**Cole** (3–1)	Newcomb (8–3)	**Chapman** (24)	**Yankee Stadium**	45,448	55–28
84	July 4	Braves	6–2	**Sabathia** (6–3)	Teherán (6–6)	—	**Yankee Stadium**	46,658	56–28
85	July 6	@ Blue Jays	2–6	Biagini (1–5)	**Gray** (5–7)	—	Rogers Centre	37,254	56–29
86	July 7	@ Blue Jays	8–5	**Severino** (14–2)	Happ (10–5)	—	Rogers Centre	44,352	57–29
87	July 8	@ Blue Jays	2–1 (10)	**Green** (5–1)	Clippard (4–3)	**Robertson** (2)	Rogers Centre	39,866	58–29
88	July 9	@ Orioles	4–5	Wright (2–0)	**Sabathia** (6–4)	Britton (2)	Orioles Park at Camden Yards	—	58–30
89	July 9	@ Orioles	10–2	**Cessa** (1–1)	Ramirez (0–3)	**Gallegos** (1)	Orioles Park at Camden Yards	26,340	59–30
90	July 10	@ Orioles	5–6	Britton (1–0)	**Betances** (1–3)	—	Orioles Park at Camden Yards	18,418	59–31
91	July 11	@ Orioles	9–0	**Gray** (6–7)	Bundy (6–9)	—	Orioles Park at Camden Yards	17,808	60–31
92	July 12	@ Indians	7–4	**Robertson** (6–3)	Kluber (12–5)	**Chapman** (25)	Progressive Field	31,267	61–31
93	July 13	@ Indians	5–6	Bieber (5–1)	**Germán** (2–5)	Allen (19)	Progressive Field	35,078	61–32
94	July 14	@ Indians	5–4	**Robertson** (7–3)	Clevinger (7–5)	**Chapman** (26)	Progressive Field	35,353	62–32
95	July 15	@ Indians	2–5	Carrasco (11–5)	**Green** (5–2)	Allen (20)	Progressive Field	32,644	62–33
**89th All-Star Game in Washington, D.C.**
96	July 20	Mets	5–7	Syndergaard (6–1)	**Germán** (2–6)	Gsellman (5)	**Yankee Stadium**	47,175	62–34
97	July 21	Mets	7–6	**Gray** (7–7)	Matz (4–8)	**Shreve** (1)	**Yankee Stadium**	47,102	63–34
—	July 22	Mets	Postponed (inclement weather). Makeup date: August 13						
98	July 23	@ Rays	6–7	Andriese (3–4)	**Severino** (14–3)	Alvarado (4)	Tropicana Field	14,670	63–35
99	July 24	@ Rays	4–0	**Tanaka** (8–2)	Chirinos (0–2)	—	Tropicana Field	19,579	64–35
100	July 25	@ Rays	2–3	Castillo (2–1)	**Cessa** (1–2)	Romo (12)	Tropicana Field	27,372	64–36
101	July 26	Royals	7–2	**Gray** (8–7)	Junis (5–11)	—	**Yankee Stadium**	46,965	65–36
—	July 27	Royals	Postponed (inclement weather). Makeup date: July 28, double header						
102	July 28	Royals	5–10	Keller (4–4)	**Severino** (14–4)	—	**Yankee Stadium**	46,571	65–37
103	July 28	Royals	5–4	**Betances** (2–3)	Flynn (2–2)	**Chapman** (27)	**Yankee Stadium**	45,043	66–37
104	July 29	Royals	6–3	**Happ** (11–6)	Smith (1–2)	**Chapman** (28)	**Yankee Stadium**	46,192	67–37
105	July 31	Orioles	6–3	**Tanaka** (9–2)	Ramírez (1–4)	**Chapman** (29)	**Yankee Stadium**	46,473	68–37

August: 17–13 (Home: 9–8; Away: 8–5)

#	Date	Opponent	Score	Win	Loss	Save	Stadium	Attendance	Record
106	August 1	Orioles	5–7	Cobb (3–14)	**Gray** (8–8)	—	**Yankee Stadium**	47,206	68–38
107	August 2	@ Red Sox	7–15	Johnson (2–3)	**Holder** (1–2)	—	Fenway Park	37,317	68–39
108	August 3	@ Red Sox	1–4	Porcello (14–4)	**Severino** (14–5)	—	Fenway Park	37,231	68–40
109	August 4	@ Red Sox	1–4	Eovaldi (5–4)	**Adams** (0–1)	—	Fenway Park	36,699	68–41
110	August 5	@ Red Sox	4–5 (10)	Barnes (4–3)	**Holder** (1–3)	—	Fenway Park	37,830	68–42
111	August 6	@ White Sox	7–0	**Lynn** (8–8)	Covey (4–8)	—	Guaranteed Rate Field	22,084	69–42
112	August 7	@ White Sox	4–3 (13)	**Gray** (9–8)	Avilán (2–1)	—	Guaranteed Rate Field	19,643	70–42
113	August 8	@ White Sox	7–3	**Severino** (15–5)	Giolito (7–9)	—	Guaranteed Rate Field	27,038	71–42
114	August 9	Rangers	7–3	**Happ** (12–6)	Jurado (2–2)	—	**Yankee Stadium**	43,455	72–42
115	August 10	Rangers	7–12	Minor (9–6)	**Tanaka** (9–3)	—	**Yankee Stadium**	45,198	72–43
116	August 11	Rangers	5–3	**Betances** (3–3)	Martin (1–3)	**Chapman** (30)	**Yankee Stadium**	45,933	73–43
117	August 12	Rangers	7–2	**Sabathia** (7–4)	Pérez (2–5)	—	**Yankee Stadium**	41,304	74–43
118	August 13	Mets	5–8	deGrom (7–7)	**Severino** (15–6)	Gsellman (7)	**Yankee Stadium**	47,233	74–44
119	August 14	Rays	4–1	**Happ** (13–6)	Wood (0–1)	**Chapman** (31)	**Yankee Stadium**	40,393	75–44
120	August 15	Rays	1–6	Yarbrough (11–5)	**Cessa** (1–3)	—	**Yankee Stadium**	42,716	75–45
121	August 16	Rays	1–3	Snell (14–5)	**Tanaka** (9–4)	Kolarek (1)	**Yankee Stadium**	41,033	75–46
122	August 17	Blue Jays	7–5 (7)	**Green** (6–2)	Biagini (1–7)	**Robertson** (3)	**Yankee Stadium**	42,121	76–46
123	August 18	Blue Jays	11–6	**Severino** (16–6)	Reid-Foley (0–2)	—	**Yankee Stadium**	44,778	77–46
124	August 19	Blue Jays	10–2	**Happ** (14–6)	Borucki (2–3)	—	**Yankee Stadium**	43,176	78–46
125	August 21	@ Marlins	2–1 (12)	**Cole** (4–1)	Guerra (1–1)	**Kahnle** (1)	Marlins Park	26,275	79–46
126	August 22	@ Marlins	3–9	García (2–2)	**Lynn** (8–9)	—	Marlins Park	25,547	79–47
127	August 24	@ Orioles	7–5 (10)	**Green** (7–2)	Carroll (0–2)	**Britton** (5)	Orioles Park at Camden Yards	27,150	80–47
128	August 25	@ Orioles	10–3	**Happ** (15–6)	Yacabonis (0–2)	**Cessa** (1)	Orioles Park at Camden Yards	32,445	81–47
129	August 25	@ Orioles	5–1	**Gray** (10–8)	Cashner (4–12)	**Betances** (1)	Orioles Park at Camden Yards	26,236	82–47
130	August 26	@ Orioles	5–3	**Severino** (17–6)	Bundy (7–13)	**Robertson** (4)	Orioles Park at Camden Yards	17,343	83–47
131	August 27	White Sox	2–6	Rodón (6–3)	**Tanaka** (9–5)	—	**Yankee Stadium**	41,456	83–48
132	August 28	White Sox	5–4	**Betances** (3–4)	Covey (4–12)	—	**Yankee Stadium**	40,015	84–48
133	August 29	White Sox	1–4	López (5–9)	**Sabathia** (7–5)	Fry (4)	**Yankee Stadium**	40,887	84–49
134	August 30	Tigers	7–8	Wilson (2–4)	**Betances** (4–4)	Greene (28)	**Yankee Stadium**	37,195	84–50
135	August 31	Tigers	7–5	**Britton** (2–0)	Jiménez (4–4)	**Robertson** (5)	**Yankee Stadium**	41,026	85–50

September: 15–12 (Home: 6–5; Away: 9–7)

#	Date	Opponent	Score	Win	Loss	Save	Stadium	Attendance	Record
136	September 1	Tigers	2–1	**Tanaka** (10–5)	Norris (0–3)	**Betances** (2)	**Yankee Stadium**	42,816	86–50
137	September 2	Tigers	7–11	Boyd (9–12)	**Lynn** (8–10)	—	**Yankee Stadium**	43,721	86–51
138	September 3	@ Athletics	3–6	Cahill (6–3)	**Sabathia** (7–6)	Treinen (36)	Oakland–Alameda County Coliseum	40,546	86–52
139	September 4	@ Athletics	5–1	**Robertson** (8–3)	Rodney (4–3)	—	Oakland–Alameda County Coliseum	17,536	87–52
140	September 5	@ Athletics	2–8	Fiers (11–6)	**Severino** (17–7)	—	Oakland–Alameda County Coliseum	21,004	87–53
141	September 7	@ Mariners	4–0	**Tanaka** (11–5)	Paxton (11–6)	—	Safeco Field	32,195	88–53
142	September 8	@ Mariners	4–2	**Lynn** (9–10)	Vincent (3–3)	**Betances** (3)	Safeco Field	38,733	89–53
143	September 9	@ Mariners	2–3	Colomé (6–5)	**Betances** (4–5)	Díaz (54)	Safeco Field	34,917	89–54
144	September 10	@ Twins	7–2	**Happ** (16–6)	Gibson (7–13)	—	Target Field	21,565	90–54
145	September 11	@ Twins	5–10	Stewart (1–1)	**Gray** (10–9)	—	Target Field	20,343	90–55
146	September 12	@ Twins	1–3	Odorizzi (6–10)	**Severino** (17–8)	Hildenberger (6)	Target Field	24,134	90–56
147	September 14	Blue Jays	11–0	**Tanaka** (12–5)	Estrada (7–12)	**Cessa** (2)	**Yankee Stadium**	40,138	91–56
148	September 15	Blue Jays	7–8	Reid-Foley (2–3)	**Sabathia** (7–7)	Giles (21)	**Yankee Stadium**	43,130	91–57
149	September 16	Blue Jays	2–3	Pannone (3–1)	**Betances** (4–6)	Giles (22)	**Yankee Stadium**	41,758	91–58
150	September 18	Red Sox	3–2	**Green** (8–2)	Workman (6–1)	**Britton** (6)	**Yankee Stadium**	38,695	92–58
151	September 19	Red Sox	10–1	**Severino** (18–8)	Price (15–7)	—	**Yankee Stadium**	43,297	93–58
152	September 20	Red Sox	6–11	Wright (3–1)	**Green** (8–3)	—	**Yankee Stadium**	47,351	93–59
153	September 21	Orioles	10–8	**Sabathia** (8–7)	Ramírez (1–7)	**Betances** (4)	**Yankee Stadium**	39,903	94–59
154	September 22	Orioles	3–2 (11)	**Kahnle** (2–0)	Fry (0–2)	—	**Yankee Stadium**	40,185	95–59
155	September 23	Orioles	3–6	Meisinger (2–0)	**Cole** (4–2)	Givens (9)	**Yankee Stadium**	43,606	95–60
156	September 24	@ Rays	4–1	**Gray** (11–9)	Yarbrough (15–6)	**Britton** (7)	Tropicana Field	13,832	96–60
157	September 25	@ Rays	9–2	**Severino** (19–8)	Faria (4–4)	—	Tropicana Field	10,953	97–60
158	September 26	@ Rays	7–8	Chirinos (5–5)	**Tanaka** (12–6)	Romo (24)	Tropicana Field	11,325	97–61
159	September 27	@ Rays	12–1	**Sabathia** (9–7)	Schultz (2–2)	—	Tropicana Field	12,349	98–61
160	September 28	@ Red Sox	11–6	**Happ** (17–6)	Johnson (4–5)	—	Fenway Park	36,779	99–61
161	September 29	@ Red Sox	8–5	**Lynn** (10–10)	Rodríguez (12–5)	**Chapman** (32)	Fenway Park	36,375	100–61
162	September 30	@ Red Sox	2–10	Rodriguez (13–5)	**Cessa** (1–4)	—	Fenway Park	36,201	100–62

== Player stats ==
=== Batting ===
Note: G = Games played; AB = At bats; R = Runs; H = Hits; 2B = Doubles; 3B = Triples; HR = Home runs; RBI = Runs batted in; SB = Stolen bases; BB = Walks; AVG = Batting average; SLG = Slugging average

Player	G	AB	R	H	2B	3B	HR	RBI	SB	BB	AVG	SLG
Giancarlo Stanton	158	617	102	164	34	1	38	100	5	70	.266	.509
Miguel Andújar	149	573	83	170	47	2	27	92	2	25	.297	.527
Brett Gardner	140	530	95	125	20	7	12	45	16	65	.236	.368
Didi Gregorius	134	504	89	135	23	5	27	86	10	48	.268	.494
Aaron Hicks	137	480	90	119	18	3	27	79	11	90	.248	.467
Gleyber Torres	123	431	54	117	16	1	24	77	6	42	.271	.480
Aaron Judge	112	413	77	115	22	0	27	67	6	76	.278	.528
Neil Walker	113	347	48	76	12	1	11	46	0	42	.219	.354
Gary Sánchez	89	323	51	60	17	0	18	53	1	46	.186	.406
Greg Bird	82	272	23	54	16	1	11	38	0	30	.199	.386
Austin Romine	77	242	30	59	12	0	10	42	1	17	.244	.417
Luke Voit	39	132	28	44	5	0	14	33	0	15	.333	.689
Tyler Austin	34	121	16	27	6	0	8	23	1	8	.223	.471
Ronald Torreyes	41	100	9	28	7	1	0	7	0	2	.280	.370
Andrew McCutchen	25	87	18	22	2	1	5	10	1	22	.253	.471
Kyle Higashioka	29	72	6	12	2	0	3	6	0	6	.167	.319
Tyler Wade	36	66	8	11	4	0	1	5	1	4	.167	.273
Brandon Drury	18	51	2	9	2	0	1	7	0	5	.176	.275
Shane Robinson	25	49	8	7	1	0	1	2	1	4	.143	.224
Adeiny Hechavarria	18	36	3	7	0	0	2	2	1	1	.194	.361
Clint Frazier	15	34	9	9	3	0	0	1	0	5	.265	.353
Jace Peterson	3	10	0	3	0	0	0	0	0	1	.300	.300
Billy McKinney	2	4	0	1	0	0	0	0	0	0	.250	.250
Pitcher totals	162	21	2	0	0	0	0	0	0	1	.000	.000
Team totals	162	5515	851	1374	269	23	267	821	63	625	.249	.451

=== Pitching ===
Note: W = Wins; L = Losses; ERA = Earned run average; G = Games pitched; GS = Games started; SV = Saves; IP = Innings pitched; H = Hits allowed; R = Runs allowed; ER = Earned run average; BB = Walks allowed; SO = Strikeouts

Player	W	L	ERA	G	GS	SV	IP	H	R	ER	BB	SO
Luis Severino	19	8	3.39	32	32	0	191.1	173	76	72	46	220
Masahiro Tanaka	12	6	3.75	27	27	0	156.0	141	68	65	35	159
CC Sabathia	9	7	3.65	29	29	0	153.0	150	72	62	51	140
Sonny Gray	11	9	4.90	30	23	0	130.1	138	73	71	57	123
Domingo Germán	2	6	5.57	21	14	0	85.2	81	55	53	33	102
Chad Green	8	3	2.50	63	0	0	75.2	64	22	21	15	94
David Robertson	8	3	3.23	69	0	5	69.2	46	30	25	26	91
Dellin Betances	4	6	2.70	66	0	4	66.2	44	22	20	26	115
Jonathan Holder	1	3	3.14	60	1	0	66.0	53	27	23	19	60
J. A. Happ	7	0	2.69	11	11	0	63.2	51	20	19	16	63
Lance Lynn	3	2	4.14	11	9	0	54.1	58	26	25	14	61
Aroldis Chapman	3	0	2.45	55	0	32	51.1	24	15	14	30	93
Luis Cessa	1	4	5.24	16	5	2	44.2	51	27	26	13	39
A. J. Cole	3	1	4.26	28	0	0	38.0	39	23	18	16	49
Chasen Shreve	2	2	4.26	40	0	1	38.0	39	23	18	18	46
Adam Warren	0	1	2.70	24	0	0	30.0	26	9	9	12	37
Jordan Montgomery	2	0	3.62	6	6	0	27.1	25	11	11	12	23
Zach Britton	1	0	2.88	25	0	3	25.0	18	10	8	11	21
Jonathan Loáisiga	2	0	5.11	9	4	0	24.2	26	17	14	12	33
Tommy Kahnle	2	0	6.56	24	0	1	23.1	23	22	17	15	30
David Hale	0	0	2.53	3	0	0	10.2	12	3	3	1	6
Giovanny Gallegos	0	0	4.50	4	0	1	10.0	10	5	5	3	10
Stephen Tarpley	0	0	3.00	10	0	0	9.0	6	3	3	6	13
Chance Adams	0	1	7.04	3	1	0	7.2	8	7	6	4	4
Justus Sheffield	0	0	10.13	3	0	0	2.2	4	3	3	3	0
George Kontos	0	0	0.00	1	0	0	1.2	1	0	0	0	2
Team totals	100	62	3.78	162	162	49	1456.1	1311	669	611	494	1634

== Postseason ==
=== Postseason game log ===
2018 Postseason game log (2−3) (Home 1−2; Away 1−1)
American League Wild Card Game: 1−0

#	Date	Opponent	Stadium	Score	Win	Loss	Save	Attendance	Record
1	October 3	Athletics	Yankee Stadium	7–2	Betances (1–0)	Hendriks (0–1)	—	49,620	1−0

American League Division Series: 1−3 (Home 0−2; Away 1−1)

#	Date	Opponent	Stadium	Score	Win	Loss	Save	Attendance	Record
1	October 5	@ Red Sox	Fenway Park	4−5	Sale (1–0)	Happ (0–1)	Kimbrel (1)	39,059	0–1
2	October 6	@ Red Sox	Fenway Park	6−2	Tanaka (1–0)	Price (0–1)	—	39,151	1−1
3	October 8	Red Sox	Yankee Stadium	1−16	Eovaldi (1–0)	Severino (0–1)	—	49,657	1−2
4	October 9	Red Sox	Yankee Stadium	3−4	Porcello (1−0)	Sabathia (0−1)	Kimbrel (2)	49,641	1−3

=== Postseason rosters ===
Playoff rosters
American League Wild Card Game

- Pitchers: 19 Masahiro Tanaka 30 David Robertson 34 J. A. Happ 36 Lance Lynn 40 Luis Severino 53 Zack Britton 54 Aroldis Chapman 56 Jonathan Holder 57 Chad Green 68 Dellin Betances
- Catchers: 24 Gary Sánchez 28 Austin Romine 66 Kyle Higashioka
- Infielders: 12 Tyler Wade 14 Neil Walker 18 Didi Gregorius 25 Gleyber Torres 29 Adeiny Hechavarria 41 Miguel Andújar 45 Luke Voit
- Outfielders: 11 Brett Gardner 26 Andrew McCutchen 31 Aaron Hicks 99 Aaron Judge
- Designated hitters: 27 Giancarlo Stanton

American League Division Series

- Pitchers: 19 Masahiro Tanaka 30 David Robertson 34 J. A. Happ 36 Lance Lynn 40 Luis Severino 52 CC Sabathia 53 Zack Britton 54 Aroldis Chapman 56 Jonathan Holder 57 Chad Green 68 Dellin Betances 71 Stephen Tarpley
- Catchers: 24 Gary Sánchez 28 Austin Romine
- Infielders: 14 Neil Walker 18 Didi Gregorius 25 Gleyber Torres 29 Adeiny Hechavarria 41 Miguel Andújar 45 Luke Voit
- Outfielders: 11 Brett Gardner 26 Andrew McCutchen 31 Aaron Hicks 99 Aaron Judge
- Designated hitters: 27 Giancarlo Stanton

== Farm system ==
Level	Team	League	Manager
AAA	Scranton/Wilkes-Barre RailRiders	International League	Bobby Mitchell
AA	Trenton Thunder	Eastern League	Jay Bell
A	Tampa Tarpons	Florida State League	Pat Osborn
A	Charleston RiverDogs	South Atlantic League	Julio Mosquera
A-Short Season	Staten Island Yankees	New York–Penn League	Lino Diaz
Rookie	Pulaski Yankees	Appalachian League	Luis Dorante
Rookie	GCL Yankees 1	Gulf Coast League	Julio Mosquera
Rookie	GCL Yankees 2	Gulf Coast League	Luis Sojo
Rookie	DSL Yankees 1	Dominican Summer League	Raul Dominguez
Rookie	DSL Yankees 2	Dominican Summer League	Raul Dominguez
