= 2018 American League Wild Card Game =

	1	2	3	4	5	6	7	8	9	R	H	E
Oakland Athletics	0	0	0	0	0	0	0	2	0	2	4	0
New York Yankees	2	0	0	0	0	4	0	1	x	7	7	1
- Date: October 3, 2018
- Venue: Yankee Stadium
- City: The Bronx, New York
- Managers: Bob Melvin (Oakland Athletics); Aaron Boone (New York Yankees)
- Umpires: HP: Jim Wolf; 1B: Greg Gibson; 2B: Gerry Davis (crew chief); 3B: Alan Porter; LF: Will Little; RF: Pat Hoberg
- Attendance: 49,620
- Television: TBS
- TV announcers: Brian Anderson, Ron Darling, Dennis Eckersley, and Lauren Shehadi
- Radio: ESPN
- Radio announcers: Jon Sciambi and Eduardo Pérez

The 2018 American League Wild Card Game was a play-in game during Major League Baseball's (MLB) 2018 postseason contested between the American League's (AL) two wild card teams, the New York Yankees and the Oakland Athletics. The game took place at Yankee Stadium on October 3, starting at 8:08 pm EDT. The Yankees won, 7–2, and advanced to face the Boston Red Sox in the American League Division Series.

This game started a part of the postseason where TBS broadcast postseason games because of the Fox's contract holdout with Optimum. Said holdout would continue until the 2018 World Series.

== Background ==
New York entered the game with a 100–62 record, while Oakland was 97–65. They met six times during the regular season, with each team winning three times.

This was New York's seventh playoff appearance as a wild card team. Since MLB's addition of a second wild card team in 2012, the Yankees had previously appeared in two Wild Card Games, a loss in 2015 and a win in 2017. The Yankees' appearance represented the first time a 100-win team played in a Wild Card Game. The most recent time that a 100-win team had not won their division was the 2001 Athletics.

This was Oakland's third playoff appearance as a wild card team. They had previously appeared in one Wild Card Game, a loss in 2014.

This was the fourth time the Yankees and A's met in postseason play—the Yankees had won the three prior meetings: the 1981 ALCS (3–0), 2000 ALDS (3–2), and 2001 ALDS (3–2).

== Game results ==
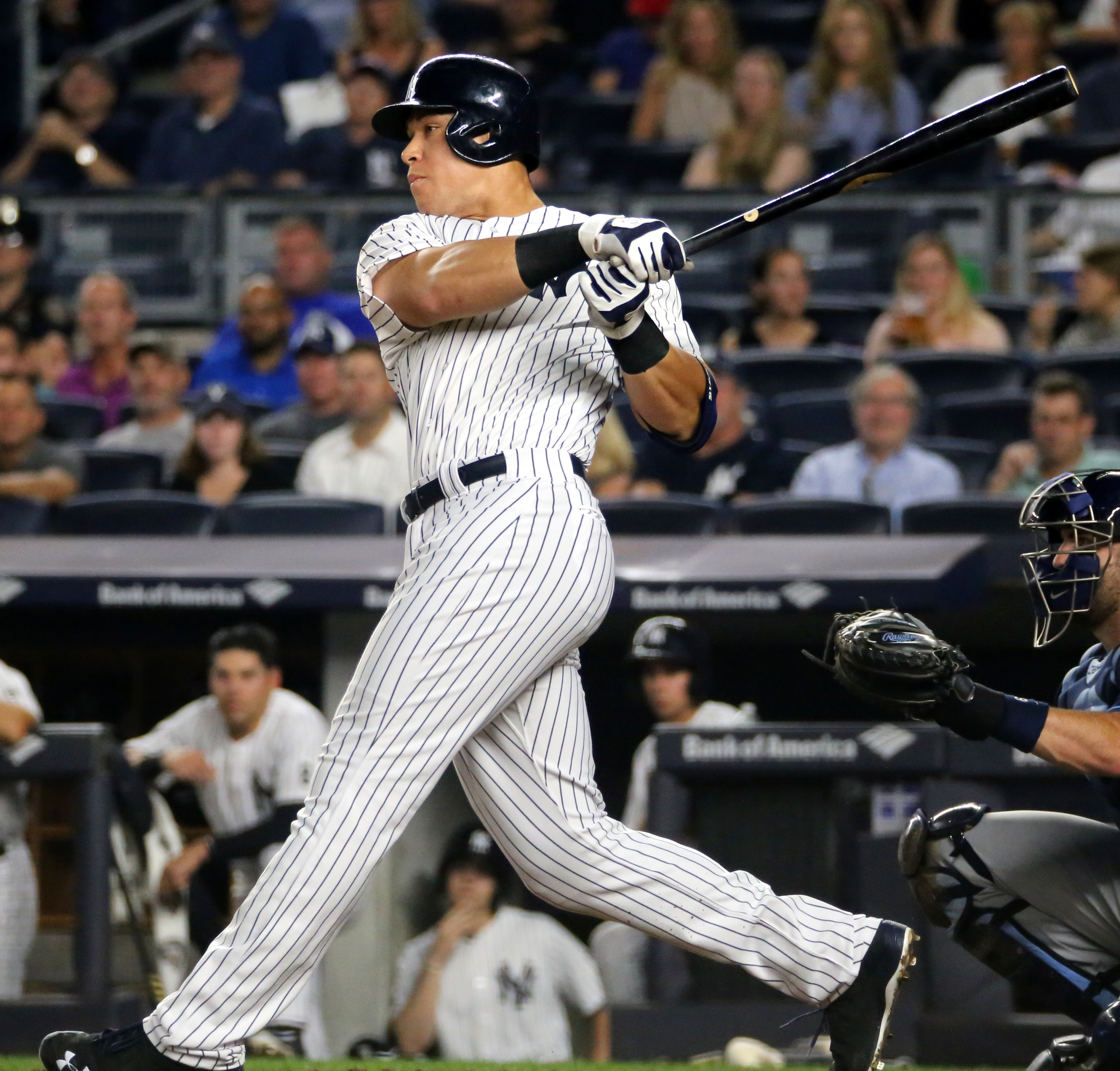
Aaron Judge hit a two-run home run in the first inning.

=== Line score ===
October 3, 2018 8:08 pm (EDT) at Yankee Stadium in Bronx, New York, 70 °F (21 °C), partly cloudy
Team	1	2	3	4	5	6	7	8	9	R	H	E
Oakland	0	0	0	0	0	0	0	2	0	2	4	0
New York	2	0	0	0	0	4	0	1	X	7	7	1
WP: Dellin Betances (1–0) LP: Liam Hendriks (0–1); Home runs: OAK: Khris Davis (1); NYY: Aaron Judge (1), Giancarlo Stanton (1); Attendance: 49,620; Boxscore

Luis Severino was the starting pitcher for the Yankees, while the Athletics used Liam Hendriks as an opener. The Yankees scored two runs in the first inning, as Aaron Judge hit a two-run homer off of Hendriks. The Yankees added four runs in the sixth, on back-to-back doubles by Judge and Aaron Hicks, followed by a walk to Giancarlo Stanton and a triple by Luke Voit. In the eighth inning, Khris Davis hit a two-run home run for Oakland and Stanton hit a home run for New York.
