= Daniel Mengden =

American baseball player (born 1993)

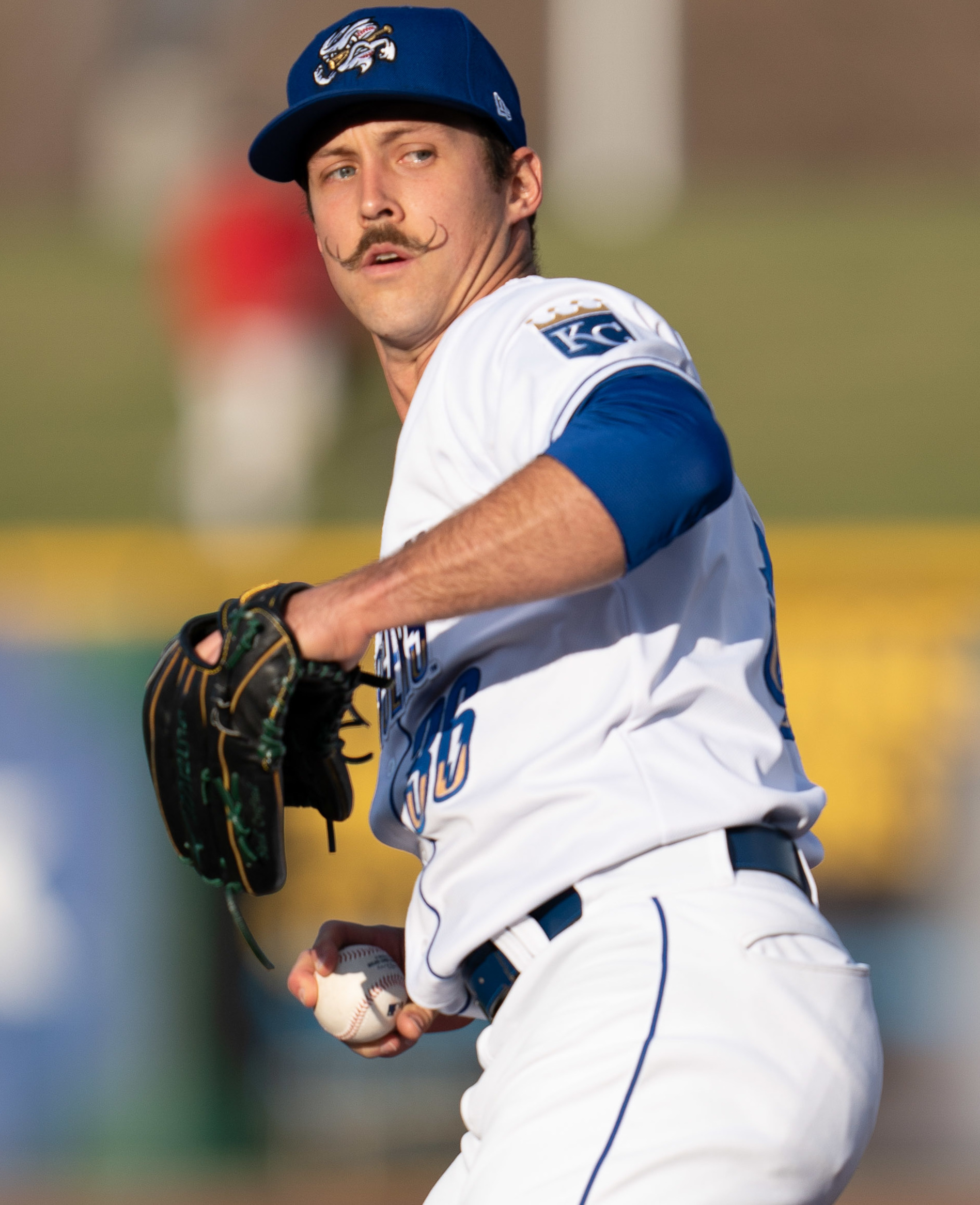
- Mengden with the Omaha Storm Chasers in 2022

Sultanes de Monterrey – No. 73
- Pitcher
- Born: February 19, 1993 (age 33); Houston, Texas, U.S.
- Bats: Right Throws: Right

Professional debut
- MLB: June 11, 2016, for the Oakland Athletics
- KBO: April 6, 2021, for the Kia Tigers
- CPBL: March 31, 2024, for the CTBC Brothers

MLB statistics (through 2022 season)
- Win–loss record: 17–21
- Earned run average: 4.65
- Strikeouts: 232

KBO statistics (through 2021 season)
- Win–loss record: 8–3
- Earned run average: 3.60
- Strikeouts: 104

CPBL statistics (through 2024 season)
- Win–loss record: 10–3
- Earned run average: 2.86
- Strikeouts: 114
- Stats at Baseball Reference

Teams
- Oakland Athletics (2016–2020); Kia Tigers (2021); Kansas City Royals (2022); CTBC Brothers (2024)

Career highlights and awards
- Taiwan Series champion (2024)

Daniel Joseph Mengden (born February 19, 1993) is an American professional baseball pitcher for the Sultanes de Monterrey of the Mexican League. He has previously played in Major League Baseball (MLB) for the Oakland Athletics and Kansas City Royals, in the KBO League for the Kia Tigers, and in the Chinese Professional Baseball League (CPBL) for the CTBC Brothers.

== College career ==
After graduating from Westside High School in Houston, Texas, Mengden played college baseball at Texas A&M University from 2012 to 2014. During his three years, he appeared in 54 games with 36 starts. He went 15–17 with a 3.21 earned run average (ERA) and 230 strikeouts.

== Professional career ==
=== Houston Astros ===
Mengden was drafted by the Houston Astros in the fourth round, with the 106th overall selection, of the 2014 Major League Baseball draft. He made his professional debut with the rookie-level Gulf Coast League Astros and was later promoted to the Low-A Tri-City ValleyCats.

In 2015, Mengden started the season with the Single-A Quad Cities River Bandits and was promoted to the High-A Lancaster JetHawks after recording a 1.16 ERA. In 10 games (8 starts) for Lancaster, he compiled a 2-1 record and 5.26 ERA with 48 strikeouts across 49 2/3 innings pitched.

=== Oakland Athletics ===
On July 23, 2015, the Astros traded Mengden and Jacob Nottingham to the Oakland Athletics in exchange for Scott Kazmir.

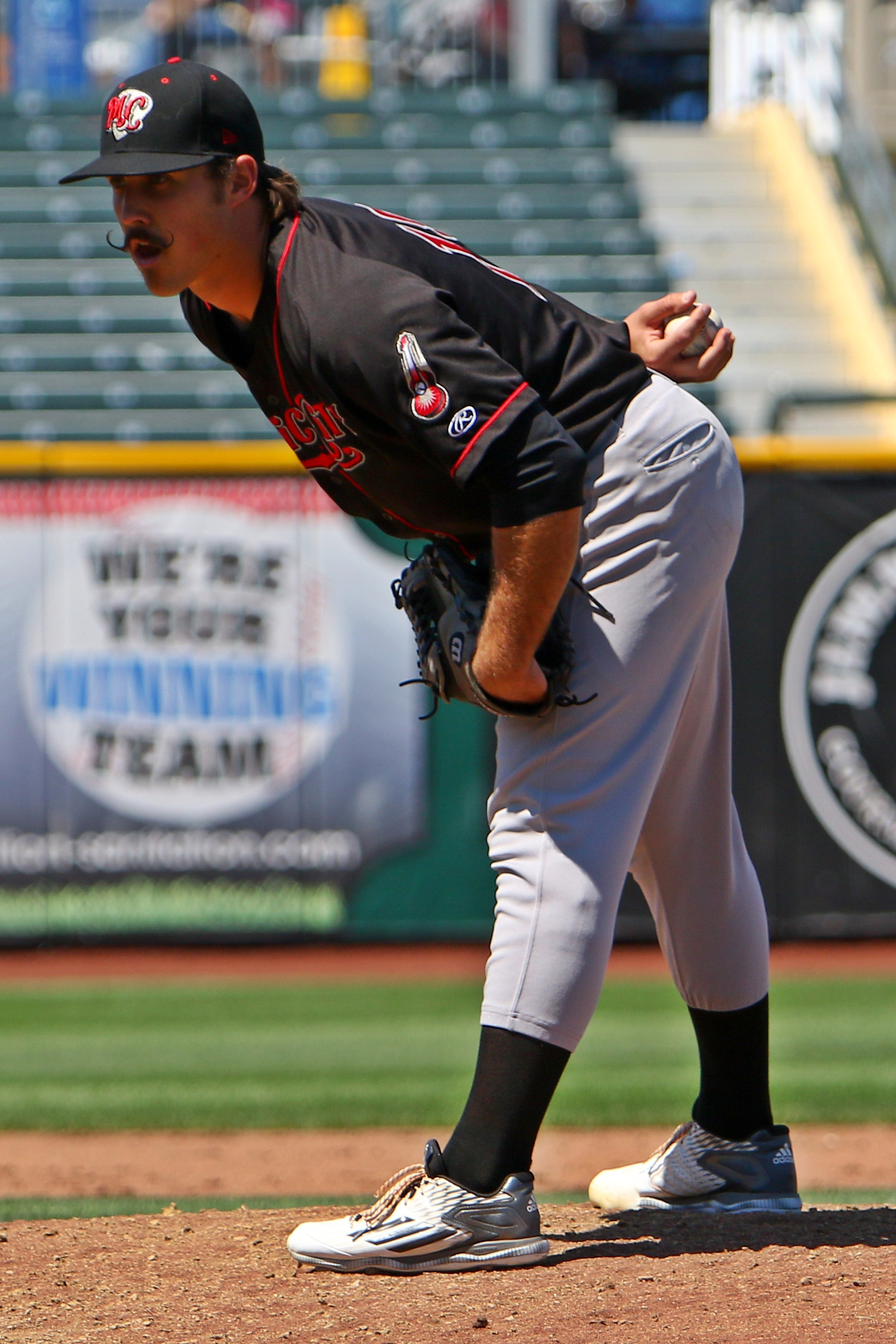
Mengden with the Nashville Sounds in 2016

In 2016, Mengden began the season with the Double-A Midland RockHounds, but was promoted to the Triple-A Nashville Sounds on May 1. With Nashville, he had a 3–1 record with a 1.39 ERA in seven starts. On June 11, 2016, he made his MLB debut, against the Cincinnati Reds. He won his first MLB game in the Battle of the Bay against the San Francisco Giants on June 27.

Mengden would remain in the rotation for the remainder of the 2016 season, finishing with 14 starts for the A's. Mengden recorded 2 wins and 9 losses with 71 strikeouts in 72 innings. In 2017, Mengden spent the majority of the season in the minors, only making 7 starts for Oakland. In 2018, he was 7-6 with an ERA of 4.05 and 72 strikeouts in 22 games (17 starts).

In 2019, Mengden did not replicate his success as he had done the previous season, going 5-2 with an ERA of 4.83 and 42 strikeouts in 13 games (9 starts).

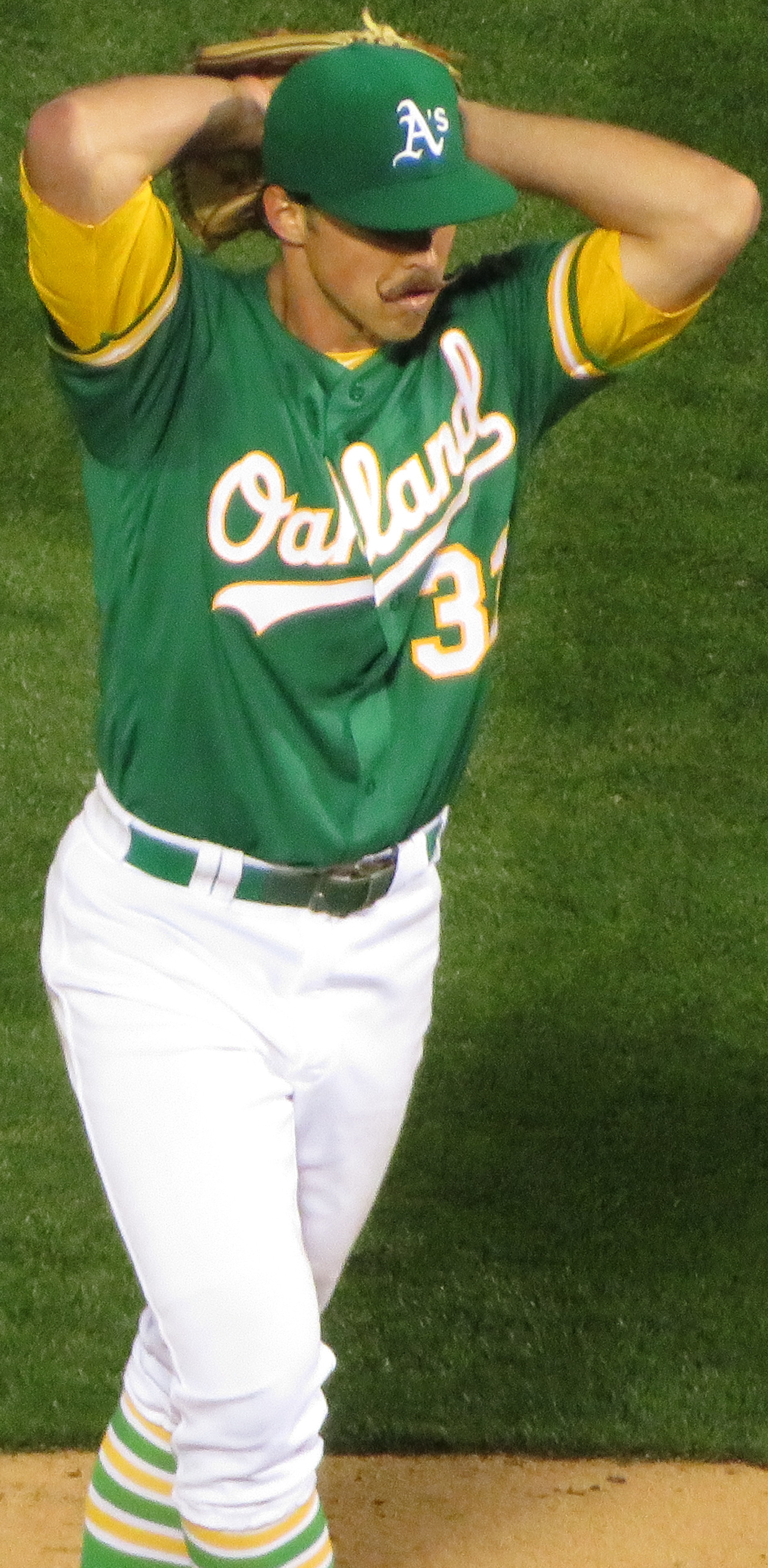
Mengden with the Oakland Athletics in 2019

During the off-season, Mengden underwent two intestinal surgeries and an arthroscopic elbow surgery. On September 20, 2020, Mengden was designated for assignment by the Athletics. On October 9, Mengden elected free agency.

While playing for the A's he was noted for his Rollie Fingers style handlebar mustache.

=== Kia Tigers ===
On December 25, 2020, Mengden signed a one-year, $725,000 guaranteed contract plus $275,000 possible performance incentives with the Kia Tigers of the KBO League. He made 21 starts for the Tigers in 2021, posting an 8-3 record and 3.60 ERA with 104 strikeouts across 120 innings pitched. Mengden became a free agent following the season.

=== Kansas City Royals ===
On March 8, 2022, Mengden signed a minor league deal with the Kansas City Royals. Mengden was selected to the 40-man roster on June 13 after Joel Payamps was placed on the COVID-19 injured list. He cleared waivers and was sent outright to the Triple–A Omaha Storm Chasers on July 2.

On September 1, Mengden was selected back to the major league roster to make a spot start against the Chicago White Sox. He went 2 2/3 innings and allowed 3 runs on 5 hits with 2 strikeouts, taking the loss. Mengden was designated for assignment by the Royals the following day. He was again sent outright to Triple–A Omaha on September 4. He elected free agency on October 6.

On March 29, 2023, Mengden re-signed with the Royals on a minor league deal. In 6 games (3 starts) for Omaha, Mengden struggled to a 7.36 ERA with 14 strikeouts across 14 2/3 innings of work. He was released by the Royals organization on June 27.

=== Washington Nationals ===
On July 2, 2023, Mengden signed a minor league contract with the Washington Nationals organization. In 22 games for the Triple–A Rochester Red Wings, he recorded a 7.20 ERA with 30 strikeouts across 35 innings of work. Mengden elected free agency following the season on November 6.

=== CTBC Brothers ===
On January 17, 2024, Mengden signed with the CTBC Brothers of the Chinese Professional Baseball League. In 25 starts for the team, he compiled a 10–3 record and 2.86 ERA with 114 strikeouts across 154 innings pitched. With the Brothers, Mengden won the 2024 Taiwan Series.

On January 23, 2025, Mengden re-signed with the Brothers. On March 5, Mengden was released by the Brothers due to failing an internal drug test.

=== Tecolotes de los Dos Laredos ===
On March 11, 2025, Mengden signed with the Tecolotes de los Dos Laredos of the Mexican League. On June 26, Mengden signed a minor league contract with the Arizona Diamondbacks; however, the transaction never materialized, and Mengden was reactivated by the team on July 5. In 17 starts, he posted a 8–5 record with a 4.00 ERA, 67 strikeouts, and 33 walks across 90 innings pitched.

Mengden logged 14 starts for the Tecolotes in 2026, compiling a 5–1 record with a 2.31 ERA, 65 strikeouts, and 15 walks in 74 innings of work.

=== Sultanes de Monterrey ===
On July 6, 2026, Mengden and Harold Ramírez were traded to the Sultanes de Monterrey of the Mexican League.

== Personal life ==
Daniel is the oldest son of Beth and Joe Mengden, and has four siblings: an older sister, Victoria; and younger siblings, Michael and Gabrielle. Mengden was home schooled through eighth grade, at which time his parents ultimately decided to place him in public high school in order to further his baseball career. Victoria is a highschool math teacher and has three younger siblings-Michael, Rachel and Gabrielle. Michael is with the Cincinnati Ballet and Gabrielle with Oklahoma City Ballet. Daniel married Danielle Bishop on November 7, 2020, in Houston, Texas.
