= Ryan Buchter =

American baseball player (born 1987)

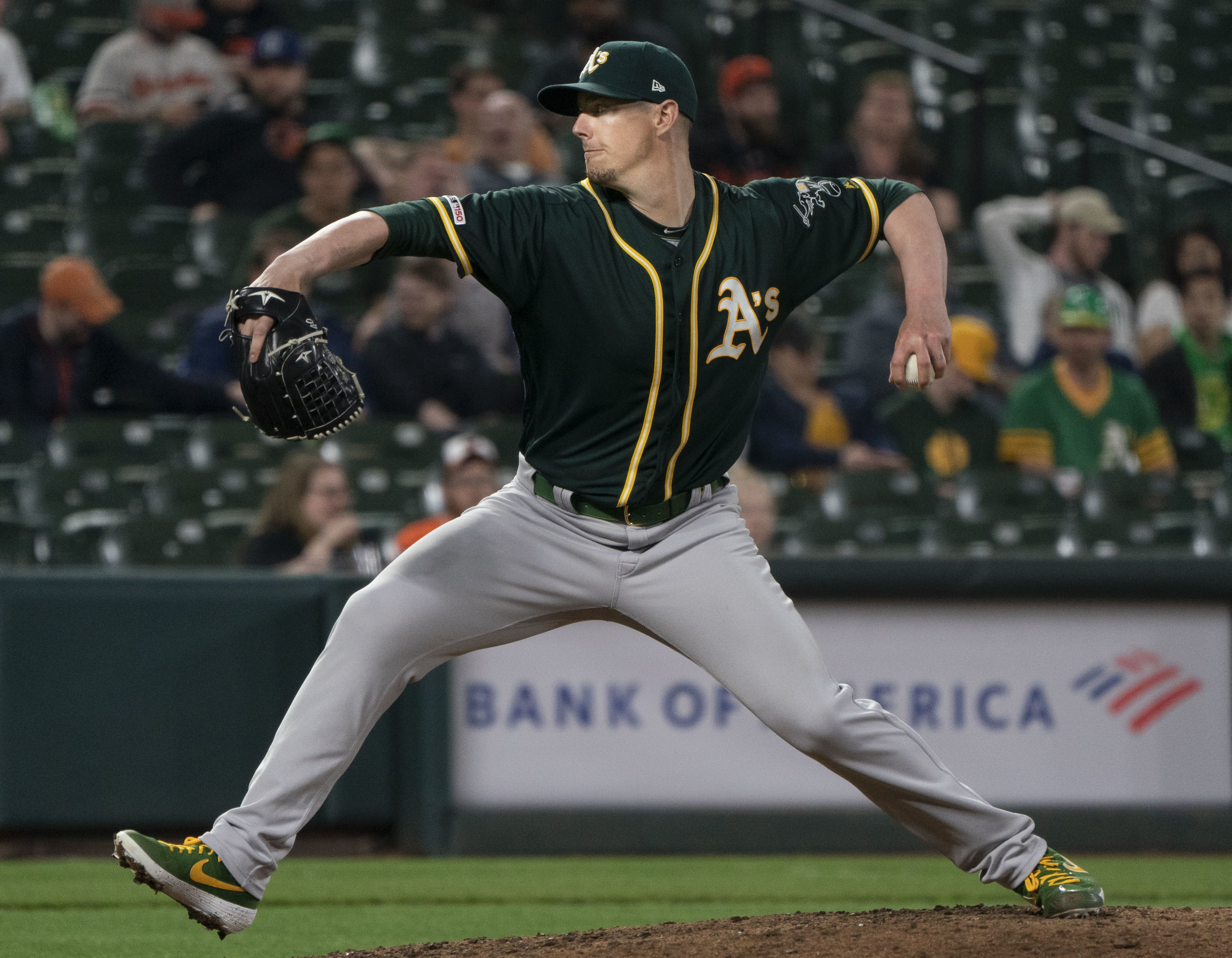
- Buchter with the Athletics in 2019
- Pitcher
- Born: February 13, 1987 (age 38); Reading, Pennsylvania, U.S.
- Batted: Left Threw: Left

MLB debut
- June 20, 2014, for the Atlanta Braves

Last MLB appearance
- August 1, 2021, for the Arizona Diamondbacks

MLB statistics
- Win–loss record: 17–6
- Earned run average: 3.16
- Strikeouts: 259
- Stats at Baseball Reference

Teams
- Atlanta Braves (2014); San Diego Padres (2016–2017); Kansas City Royals (2017); Oakland Athletics (2018–2019); Los Angeles Angels (2020); Arizona Diamondbacks (2021)

Ryan James Buchter (born February 13, 1987) is an American former professional baseball pitcher and the current pitching coach for the Philadelphia Phillies' High-A affiliate, the Jersey Shore Blue Claws. He played in Major League Baseball (MLB) for the Atlanta Braves, San Diego Padres, Kansas City Royals, Oakland Athletics, Los Angeles Angels, and Arizona Diamondbacks.

== Playing career ==
=== Washington Nationals ===
Buchter was drafted by the Washington Nationals in the 33rd round of the 2005 Major League Baseball draft out of Highland Regional High School in Blackwood, New Jersey. He went on to play college baseball in the 2006 season at Gloucester County College in Sewell, New Jersey before ultimately signing with the Nationals. He began his professional career with the Gulf Coast Nationals in 2006 where he was 7.24 ERA in 11 games and made one start. In 2007 with the Vermont Lake Monsters of the New York–Penn League, he had a 6.82 ERA in 20 games. Buchter was promoted to the Hagerstown Suns of the South Atlantic League in 2008 and appeared in 13 games with a 3.26 ERA.

=== Chicago Cubs ===
Buchter was traded from the Nationals to the Chicago Cubs for fellow minor leaguer Matt Avery on November 3, 2008. He played for the Peoria Chiefs in the Single–A Midwest League in 2009 and had a 1.33 ERA in 38 games with five saves. The following season, 2010, he had a 7–2 record and a 4.65 ERA in 47 games for the Double-A Tennessee Smokies, which earned him a spot on the Southern League mid-season All-Star team. In 2011, he made 10 appearances for the Smokies and another six for the Daytona Cubs of the Florida State League.

=== Atlanta Braves ===
On May 26, 2011, Buchter was then traded from the Cubs to the Atlanta Braves for Rodrigo López. He was promptly assigned to the Lynchburg Hillcats of the Carolina League, where he was 2–5 with a 3.59 ERA in 34 games with 15 saves. In 2012, he began the season with the Double-A Mississippi Braves, where he was 3–1 with a 1.31 ERA in 35 games and also had four saves. He was again selected to the mid-season Southern League All-Star team. Afterwards, he was promoted to the Triple-A Gwinnett Braves where he pitched eight innings in nine games with a high 10.12 ERA. He played for the Phoenix Desert Dogs in the Arizona Fall League after the conclusion of the regular season.

The Braves added him to their 40-man roster on November 1, 2013 and he was named to the Braves' Opening Day roster for the 2014 season. He was sent back down to Gwinnett a few days later without appearing in a game. Buchter was called back up to Atlanta on June 20, 2014. He made his major league debut that night against the team that drafted him, the Washington Nationals, recording a strikeout and earning the win in an inning of extra inning work. That was his only appearance in the Majors and he spent the rest of the season with Gwinnett, where he pitched in 49 games with a 3.29 ERA. Buchter was outrighted off the Braves roster on September 26, 2014, and became a free agent on November 3.

=== Los Angeles Dodgers ===
On January 9, 2015, Buchter signed a minor league contract with the Los Angeles Dodgers with an invitation to spring training. He was assigned to the AAA Oklahoma City Dodgers and was selected to the mid-season Pacific Coast League all-star team. In 27 games he had a 1.65 ERA and exercised his opt out clause on July 20 to become a free agent.

=== Chicago Cubs (second stint) ===
On July 27, 2015, Buchter signed a minor league contract with the Chicago Cubs. He finished the year with the Triple-A Iowa Cubs, recording a 2.00 ERA in 16 appearances. He became a free agent after the season on November 6.

=== San Diego Padres ===
On December 8, 2015, Buchter signed a minor league contract with the San Diego Padres. On January 8, 2016, Buchter's contract was selected. In his two seasons with the Padres, Buchter owned an ERA of 2.93 with 125 strikeouts in over 100 innings.

=== Kansas City Royals ===
On July 24, 2017, the Padres traded Buchter, Trevor Cahill, and Brandon Maurer to the Kansas City Royals for Matt Strahm, Travis Wood, and Esteury Ruiz.

=== Oakland Athletics ===
On January 29, 2018, the Royals traded Buchter, Brandon Moss, and cash considerations to the Oakland Athletics for Jesse Hahn and Heath Fillmyer. In his first season with Oakland, Buchter posted an ERA of 2.75 in 60 appearances. He struck out 41 batters in 39 1/3 innings. Buchter was non-tendered by Oakland on December 2, 2019, and became a free agent.

=== Los Angeles Angels ===
On February 23, 2020, Buchter signed a minor league contract with the Los Angeles Angels, and received an invitation to spring training. Buchter had his contract selected on March 22. In 10 games for the Angels, he logged a 4.50 ERA with 8 strikeouts over 6 innings of work. Buchter was designated for assignment by the Angels on September 2. He was outrighted on September 5, but rejected his assignment and elected free agency the next day.

=== New York Yankees ===
On September 8, 2020, Buchter signed a minor league contract with the New York Yankees. He did not play in a game for the Yankees organization due to the cancellation of the minor league season because of the COVID-19 pandemic. Buchter became a free agent on November 2.

=== Arizona Diamondbacks ===
On January 19, 2021, Buchter signed a minor league contract with the Arizona Diamondbacks organization. On May 27, 2021, Buchter was selected to the active roster. After posting a 5.52 ERA across 16 appearances, Buchter was designated for assignment on July 5. He was outrighted to the Triple-A Reno Aces on July 7. On July 30, his contract was selected by Arizona. On August 6, Buchter was returned to Reno. On August 20, Buchter was released by the Diamondbacks.

=== Seattle Mariners ===
On March 20, 2022, the Seattle Mariners signed Buchter to a minor league deal. On March 31, Buchter was released by the Mariners organization.

== Coaching career ==
On January 31, 2023, it was announced that Buchter had been hired as the assistant pitching coach for the Lehigh Valley IronPigs, the Triple-A affiliate of the Philadelphia Phillies. On February 7, 2025, Buchter was named a pitching coach for Philadelphia's High-A affiliate, the Jersey Shore BlueClaws.

== Personal life ==
In 2021, Buchter began advocating for better mental health resources for professional baseball players, stating that the game had caused him to become a "depressed alcoholic" in 2016 and 2017 and that he felt he was a better player when drinking.
