= Jake Smolinski =

American baseball player (born 1989)

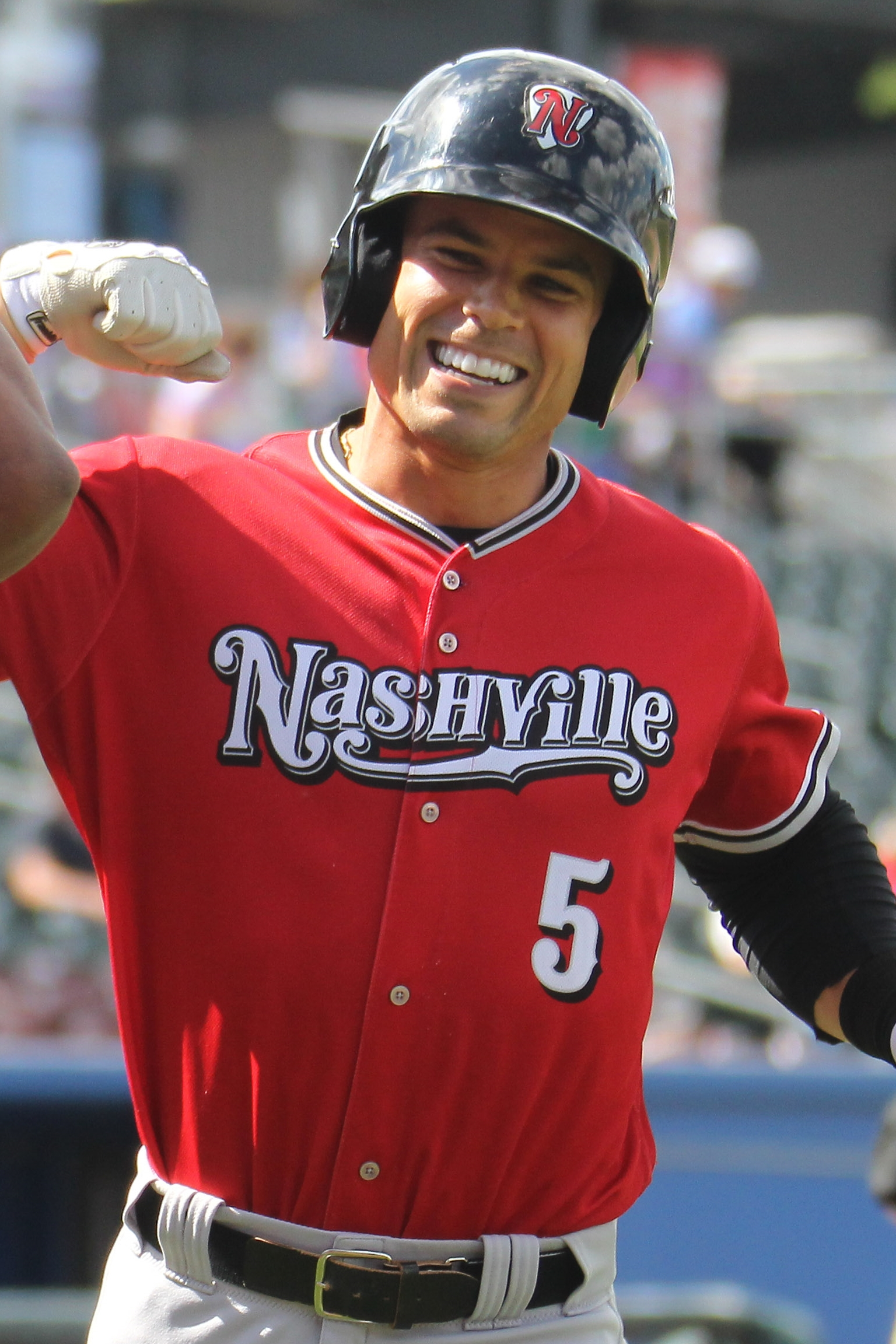
- Smolinski with the Nashville Sounds in 2018
- Left fielder
- Born: February 9, 1989 (age 36); Rockford, Illinois, U.S.
- Batted: Right Threw: Right

Professional debut
- MLB: July 7, 2014, for the Texas Rangers
- KBO: July 11, 2019, for the NC Dinos

Last appearance
- MLB: June 20, 2018, for the Oakland Athletics
- KBO: October 1, 2019, for the NC Dinos

MLB statistics
- Batting average: .235
- Home runs: 16
- Runs batted in: 67

KBO statistics
- Batting average: .226
- Home runs: 14
- Runs batted in: 59
- Stats at Baseball Reference

Teams
- Texas Rangers (2014–2015); Oakland Athletics (2015–2018); NC Dinos (2019)

Jacob Michael Smolinski (born February 9, 1989) is an American former professional baseball left fielder. He played in Major League Baseball (MLB) for the Texas Rangers and Oakland Athletics, and in the KBO League for the NC Dinos.

== Amateur career ==
Born and raised in Rockford, Illinois, Smolinski attended Boylan Catholic High School where he also starred in football as a quarterback. In baseball, Smolinski was a shortstop and pitcher. As a senior, Smolinski batted .441 with 13 home runs and 49 RBIs.

== Professional career ==
=== Washington Nationals ===
Smolinski was drafted as a left fielder and third baseman by the Washington Nationals in the second round of the 2007 Major League Baseball draft, out of high school.

=== Florida Marlins ===
On November 10, 2008, he was traded to the Florida Marlins along with Emilio Bonifacio and P. J. Dean for Josh Willingham and Scott Olsen.

=== Texas Rangers ===
He signed a minor league deal with the Texas Rangers in December 2013. Smolinski was called up to the majors for the first time on July 7, 2014.

=== Oakland Athletics ===
Smolinski was claimed off waivers by the Oakland Athletics on June 21, 2015. He declared free agency on October 15, 2018.

=== Tampa Bay Rays ===
On November 15, 2018, Smolinski signed a minor-league contract with the Tampa Bay Rays. On July 2, 2019, Smolinski was granted a release from Triple-A Durham to pursue options in Korea.

=== NC Dinos ===
On July 2, 2019, Smolinski signed with the NC Dinos of the KBO League. He became a free agent following the season.
