= Chris Hatcher (pitcher) =

American baseball player (born 1985)

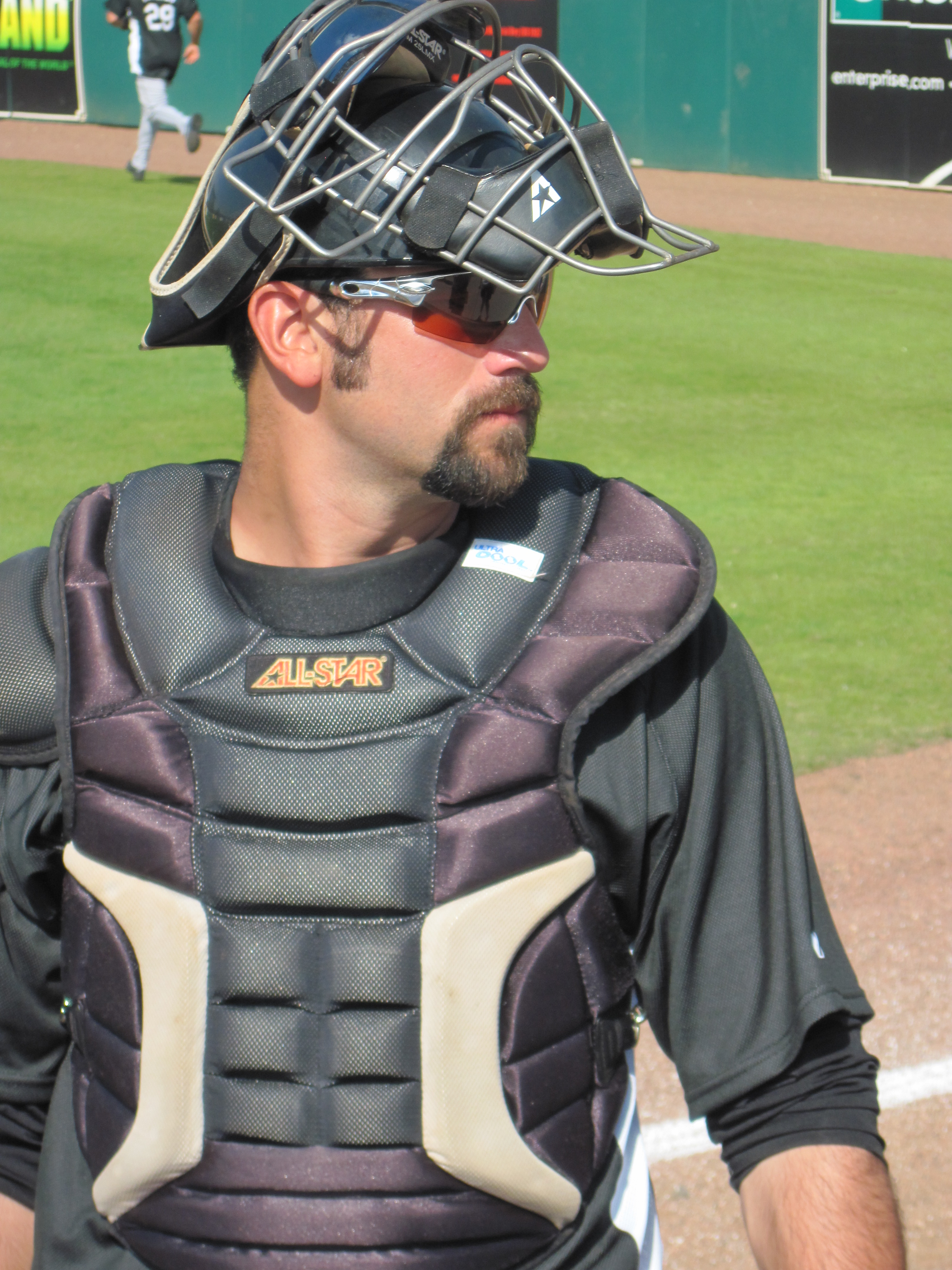
- Hatcher while still playing as catcher with the Florida Marlins in 2010 spring training
- Pitcher / Catcher
- Born: January 12, 1985 (age 41); Kinston, North Carolina, U.S.
- Batted: Switch Threw: Right

MLB debut
- September 19, 2010, for the Florida Marlins

Last MLB appearance
- September 30, 2018, for the Oakland Athletics

MLB statistics
- Win–loss record: 12–17
- Earned run average: 4.55
- Strikeouts: 266
- Stats at Baseball Reference

Teams
- Florida/Miami Marlins (2010–2014); Los Angeles Dodgers (2015–2017); Oakland Athletics (2017–2018)

David Christopher Hatcher (born January 12, 1985) is an American former professional baseball pitcher. He played in Major League Baseball (MLB) for the Florida/Miami Marlins, Los Angeles Dodgers, and Oakland Athletics.

== Career ==
=== Amateur ===
Hatcher attended Kinston High School in Kinston, North Carolina, where he played catcher and also pitched. After graduation, he was recruited to play baseball for the University of North Carolina Wilmington. As a freshman, he hit .315 in 29 games while also pitching two innings. As a sophomore, he hit .300 with seven homers and 39 RBI and as a junior he hit .348 with seven homers and 55 RBI.

=== Florida / Miami Marlins ===
The Florida Marlins selected Hatcher in the fifth round of the 2006 Major League Baseball draft. He began his professional career with the Marlins organization as a catcher. His best minor league season was 2007 with the Class A Greensboro Grasshoppers, where he played in 102 games and had a .242 batting average and 15 home runs.

Hatcher was promoted to the Major Leagues for the first time on September 1, 2010 as a catcher. He made his MLB debut as a pinch hitter on September 19, in the bottom of the ninth inning against Scott Maine of the Chicago Cubs, and struck out swinging. He was hitless in six at-bats in five games in 2010 for the Marlins, which included two starts at catcher.

In 2011, Hatcher switched position to pitcher, at the behest of the Marlins' organization, to facilitate his return to the majors. He was the first player since the 1940s to change positions from a catcher to a pitcher

Hatcher made his MLB debut as a pitcher against the Chicago Cubs at Wrigley Field on July 16, 2011 in a Marlins win. On May 5, 2012, Hatcher, along with Sandy Rosario, was called up by the Marlins. However, only four days later, both Hatcher and Rosario were sent back to the minors. On June 16, Hatcher was called up again by the Marlins. The next day, he pitched in one inning against the Tampa Bay Rays, his first Major League appearance of the season. Hatcher was sent down to the minors on June 21, after the Marlins called up Mike Dunn. He only made two appearances, pitching 2.2 innings, with an ERA of 13.50, and 3 strikeouts, but gave up 4 hits, 4 runs, 3 walks, and 2 home runs. He primarily spent 2013 with the Triple-A New Orleans Zephyrs, where he had a 4-3 record and a 3.61 ERA over 60 games.

Hatcher was designated for assignment by the Marlins on February 11, 2014. He was outrighted to the minors and assigned to New Orleans. While in the minors, he was involved in a fight with Sam Dyson, a teammate with the Zephyrs, at a Miami bar during which Dyson's jaw was broken. He was later suspended 5 games by the Zephyrs for conduct detrimental to the team. He returned to the Marlins on May 23 and pitched in a career high 52 games with a 3.38 ERA.

=== Los Angeles Dodgers ===
On December 10, 2014, Hatcher was traded to the Los Angeles Dodgers, along with Andrew Heaney, Austin Barnes, and Enrique Hernández, in exchange for Dan Haren, Dee Gordon, Miguel Rojas and cash. He was initially seen as a key figure in improving what had been a poor Dodger bullpen the previous season. With Kenley Jansen on the disabled list at the start of the season, Hatcher not only made the opening day roster but was given the first opportunity to be the team's fill-in closer and picked up his first career save on opening day. However, he struggled in subsequent outings and he was moved into less stressful situations. Regardless, manager Don Mattingly said, "we're not losing faith in him" despite cause for concern about the release point of his pitches. He was placed on the disabled list with a strained oblique, where he remained for two months. When he rejoined the team he regained his form and Mattingly started showing more faith in him. He appeared in 49 games for the Dodgers in 2015, with a 3–5 record and 3.60 ERA and four saves. In four appearances in the Dodgers' loss to the Mets in the NLDS, the only postseason action of his career, Hatcher pitched 3^{2}/_{3} innings without allowing a run or a hit, and tallied five strikeouts.

On January 13, 2016, Hatcher and the Dodgers reached agreement on a one-year, $1.065 million, contract to avoid salary arbitration. He pitched in 37 games for the Dodgers in 2016, with a 5–4 record and 5.53 ERA in 40 2/3 innings. On July 20, he was placed on the disabled list with an oblique strain and he didn't return. On December 1, 2016, he signed a one-year, $1.25 million, contract with the Dodgers to avoid arbitration. He appeared in 26 games for the Dodgers with a 4.66 ERA in 2017.

=== Oakland Athletics ===
On August 15, 2017, Hatcher was traded to the Oakland Athletics for $500,000 in international bonus money. With the Athletics in 2017, he pitched in 23 games with a 3.52 ERA. In 2018, he pitched to a 4.95 ERA in 34 games. Hatcher declared free agency on October 15, 2018.
