= 2018 Boston Red Sox season =

Major League Baseball season

2018 Boston Red Sox
- World Series champions American League champions American League East champions
- League: American League
- Division: East
- Ballpark: Fenway Park
- City: Boston, Massachusetts
- Record: 108–54 (.667)
- Divisional place: 1st
- Owners: John W. Henry (Fenway Sports Group)
- President: Sam Kennedy
- President of baseball operations: Dave Dombrowski
- General manager: none (de facto by President of Baseball Operations)
- Manager: Alex Cora
- Television: NESN (Dave O'Brien, Jerry Remy, Dennis Eckersley, Steve Lyons, Tom Caron)
- Radio: WEEI-FM; Boston Red Sox Radio Network (Joe Castiglione, Tim Neverett, Lou Merloni)
- Stats: ESPN.com; Baseball Reference

The 2018 Boston Red Sox season was the 118th season in the team's history, and their 107th season at Fenway Park. Under first year manager Alex Cora, the team finished with a 108–54 record, winning the American League East division title for the third consecutive season, and finished eight games ahead of the second-place New York Yankees. The Red Sox were the first MLB team to post 100 wins during the 2018 season, reaching that milestone for the first time since 1946; they were also the first team to clinch a berth in the 2018 postseason.

The team set a new franchise record for wins in a season by surpassing the prior mark of 105 that had been set in 1912; they also won the most games by any MLB team since the 2001 Seattle Mariners won 116. Mookie Betts finished the season with the Major League batting title, hitting .346, while J. D. Martinez finished second in the majors with .330. Betts also won a Gold Glove and the Major League Baseball Most Valuable Player Award. Closer Craig Kimbrel became the fastest player in history to reach 300 career saves, finishing the season with 333.

The Red Sox entered the postseason as the top seed in the American League, and defeated the Yankees in four games in the Division Series. They then defeated the defending champion Houston Astros in five games in the Championship Series, advancing to the World Series where they defeated the Los Angeles Dodgers in five games, securing their ninth World Series championship overall and their fourth since breaking the "Curse of the Bambino" in 2004.

The team was later accused of electronic sign stealing. An investigation into the allegation stated that the sign stealing was "limited in scope and impact," but nonetheless resulted in the suspension of a team video replay operator and the loss of a second-round draft pick in the 2020 draft for the organization. Regardless, the team has been considered the best MLB team of the 2010s, one of the best Red Sox teams ever, and one of the best baseball teams since the 1998 New York Yankees.

== Offseason ==
=== October 2017 ===
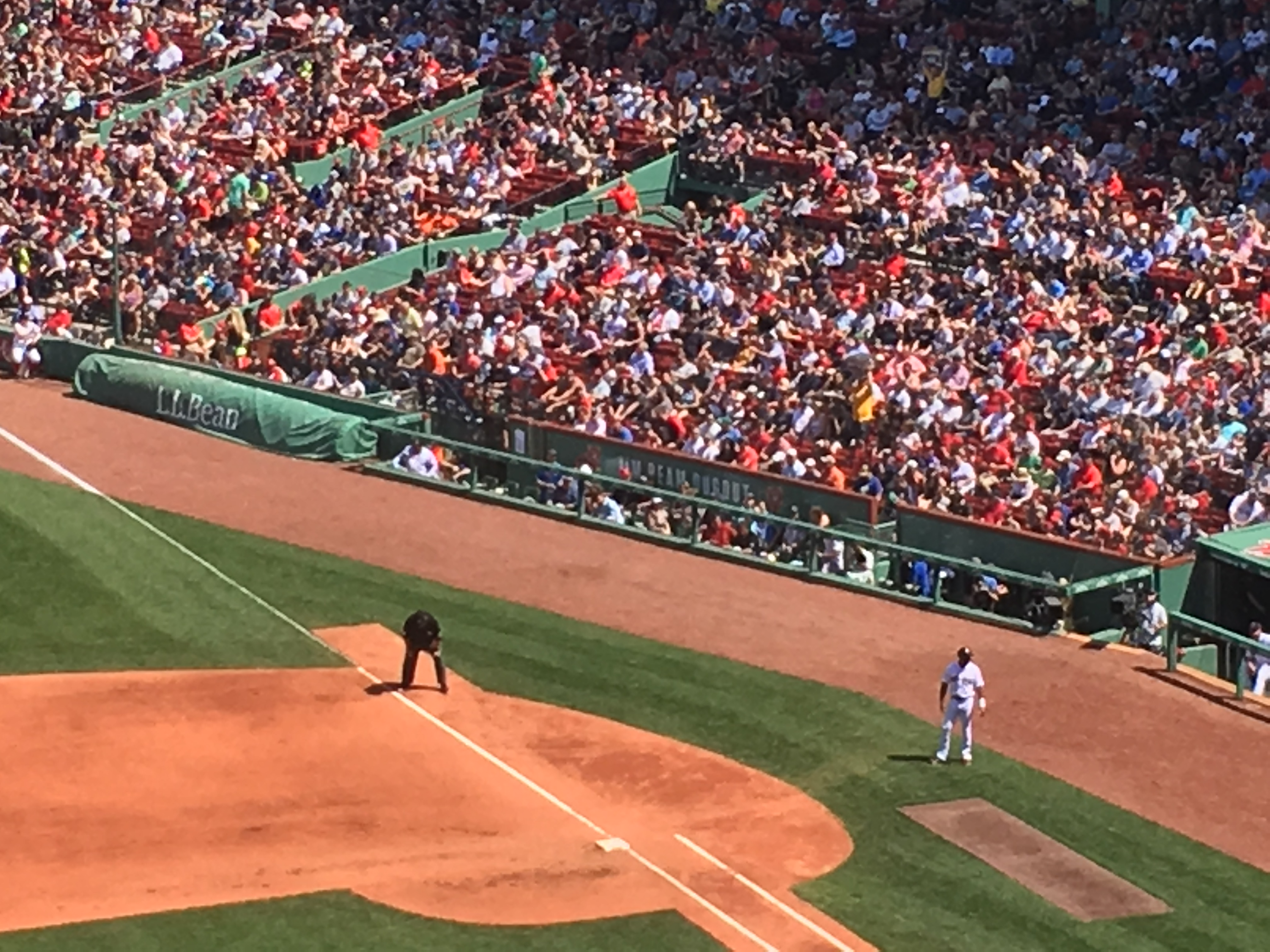
Field-level premium seating near the first base area

- On October 11, the Red Sox announced that John Farrell would not return as the team's manager for the 2018 season.
- On October 22, the Red Sox announced that Alex Cora, who spent 2005–2008 with the club, had signed a three-year deal to become the new manager of the team.
- On October 25, it was reported that the Red Sox received approval from the Boston Landmarks Commission to add premium seating next to both dugouts. The seats, later branded the Jim Beam Dugout, became available for the 2018 season, at per-game prices starting at $12,500 for 25 guests.
- On October 26, the Cleveland Indians hired pitching coach Carl Willis and the Chicago Cubs hired hitting coach Chili Davis and third base coach Brian Butterfield.

=== November 2017 ===
- On November 2, the Red Sox named Carlos Febles as their third base coach; Febles has been in the Red Sox organization since 2007, and most recently was manager of the Portland Sea Dogs. The same day, the Red Sox named Ron Roenicke as bench coach; he previously managed the Milwaukee Brewers (2011–2015) and most recently was third base coach of the Los Angeles Angels.
- On November 4, Tim Hyers was named hitting coach of the Red Sox; he was previously with the team from 2013 through 2015 as minor league hitting coordinator, then spent 2016 and 2017 as assistant hitting coach for the Los Angeles Dodgers.
- On November 8, the Red Sox named Dana LeVangie as their pitching coach; LeVangie has been with the Red Sox since 1991; he was a minor league player (1991–1996), bullpen catcher (1997–2004), and a scout (2005–2012) before joining the coaching staff.
- On November 13, the Red Sox hired Craig Bjornson as their bullpen coach; Bjornson had been in the same role with the Houston Astros for the 2014 though 2017 seasons.

=== December 2017 ===
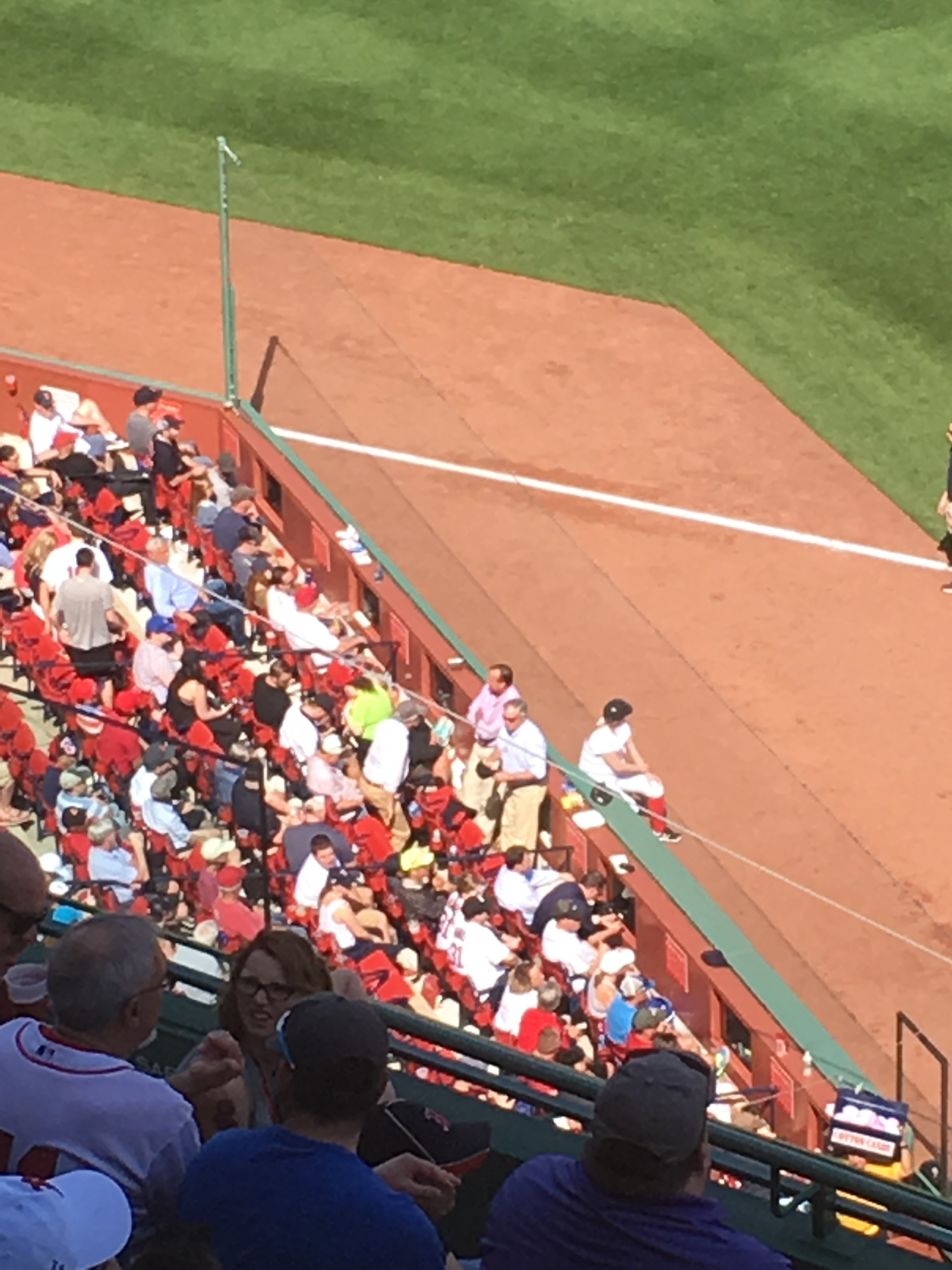
Safety netting near the third base line

- On December 18, the Red Sox re-signed first baseman Mitch Moreland to a two-year, $13M contract.

=== January 2018 ===
- On January 22, it was reported that the safety netting at Fenway Park would be extended down both foul lines; to Section 79 in left field and to Section 9 in right field.

=== February 2018 ===
- On February 5—"Truck Day"—equipment for spring training left Fenway Park for JetBlue Park at Fenway South.
- On February 14, pitchers and catchers had their first workout at spring training.
- On February 18, the Red Sox re-signed IF Eduardo Núñez to a one-year, $4M deal.
- On February 19, the team had its first full squad workout at spring training.
- On February 22, the team played exhibition games against the Northeastern Huskies and the Boston College Eagles; the Red Sox won both games, by scores of 15–2 and 4–2, respectively.
- On February 23, the team played its first Grapefruit League game, against the Minnesota Twins; the Red Sox won, 4–3.
- On February 26, the Red Sox announced they signed OF/DH J. D. Martinez to a five-year, $110M deal.
- On February 28, the Red Sox announced that they had filed a petition with the City of Boston to change the name of Yawkey Way—the street where the main entrance of Fenway Park is located—to its original name, Jersey Street. The change was approved in April 2018, and the name reverted in May 2018.

=== March 2018 ===
- On March 24, the Red Sox traded IF Deven Marrero to the Arizona Diamondbacks for a player to be named later or cash considerations.
- On March 27, the team played its final spring training game, defeating the Chicago Cubs, 4–2.

== Regular season ==
=== Opening Day, March 29 at Tampa Bay Rays ===
The 2018 regular season began on March 29, 2018, against the Tampa Bay Rays at Tropicana Field. Manager Alex Cora named Chris Sale as the Red Sox opening day starter opposite Chris Archer. The Red Sox built a 4–0 lead through seven innings, including an inside-the-park home run by Eduardo Núñez. Sale pitched six innings, giving up just one hit and walking three, while striking out nine. After Matt Barnes held the Rays scoreless in the seventh inning, Joe Kelly and Carson Smith gave up a total of six runs in the eighth inning, allowing Tampa Bay to take a 6–4 lead. Rays closer Álex Colomé pitched a scoreless ninth inning for the save.

==== Opening Day lineup ====
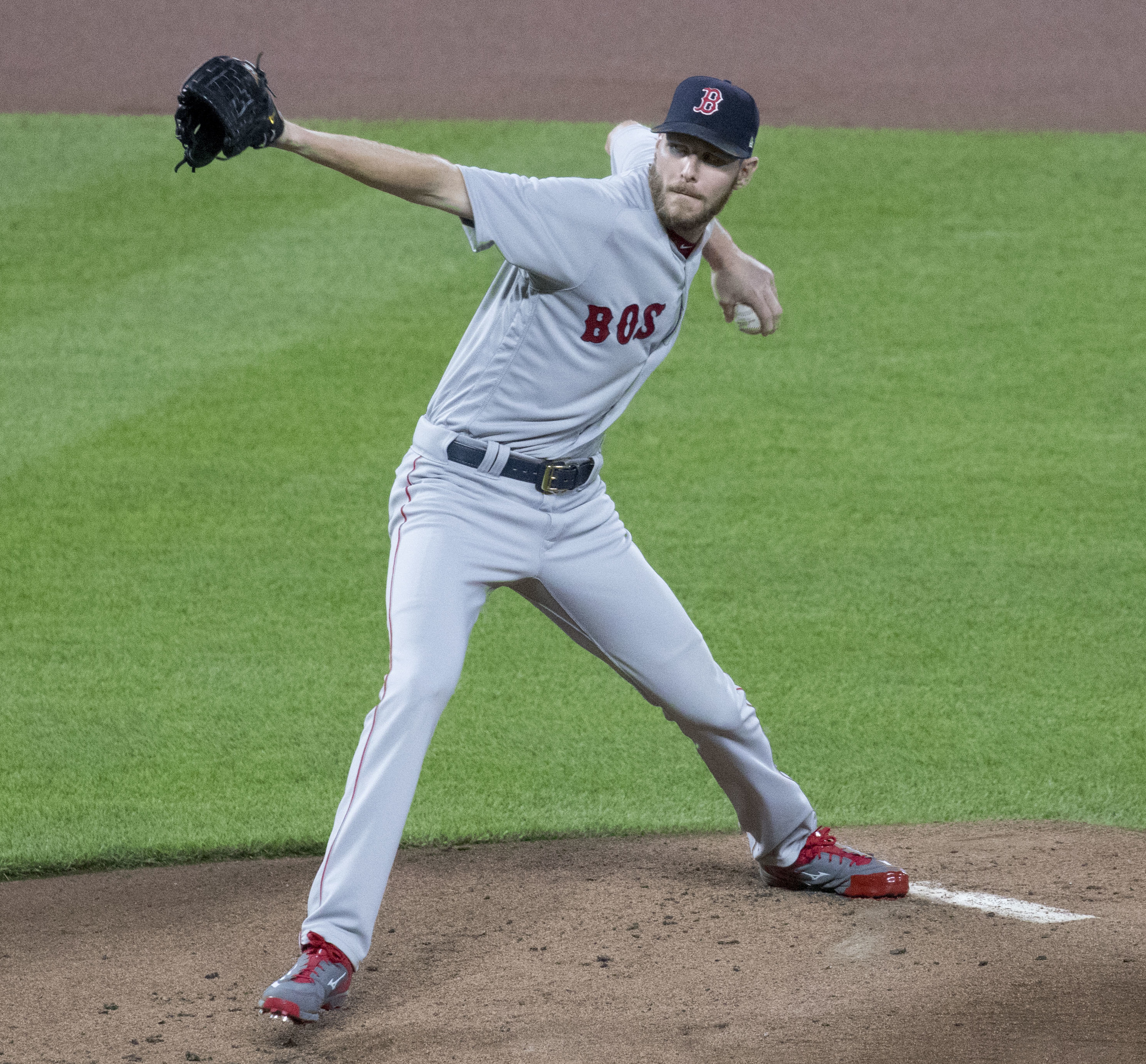
Opening Day starter Chris Sale

50	Mookie Betts	RF
16	Andrew Benintendi	LF
13	Hanley Ramírez	1B
28	J. D. Martinez	DH
2	Xander Bogaerts	SS
11	Rafael Devers	3B
36	Eduardo Núñez	2B
19	Jackie Bradley Jr.	CF
7	Christian Vázquez	C
41	Chris Sale	P

March / April

=== March ===
March 29–March 31, at Tampa Bay Rays
After the tough loss on opening day, David Price made his 2018 debut and threw seven shut-out innings on just 76 pitches. Matt Barnes and Craig Kimbrel shut the door. The lone run of the game was scored by Xander Bogaerts in the seventh. In game three of the four-game series, the baseball was handed to Rick Porcello, who pitched 5 1/3 innings and allowed one run on six hits. Bogaerts went 3-for-4, scored a run, drove in two, and hit his fifth double of the season.

=== April ===
April 1, at Tampa Bay Rays (cont.)
For the third game in a row, the Red Sox won the match by the smallest of margins. Héctor Velázquez allowed one run in 5 2/3 innings. Mookie Betts and Jackie Bradley Jr. scored to win the series.
Red Sox won the series 3–1 (10–9 runs)

April 2–April 3, at Miami Marlins
In the series opener, Brian Johnson made his season debut and continued the strong start of Boston's starting pitching. He allowed only one run in six innings, while Hanley Ramírez and Mookie Betts went yard for the first time of the young season. Final score, 7–3 for Boston. The next day, Chris Sale exited the game after five innings with the score tied 1–1, followed by five scoreless frames. The Red Sox scored in the top of the 11th, but the Marlins got a tying run off of Matt Barnes in the bottom of the 11th. Ramírez then drove in Betts and Andrew Benintendi in the top of the 13th, with Heath Hembree picking up the win, 4–2.
Red Sox won the series 2–0 (11–5 runs)

April 5–April 8, vs. Tampa Bay Rays
In the first game of the series, David Price pitched seven innings, giving up no runs on three hits, but the Red Sox had to force extra innings with two runs in the bottom of the ninth. After two scoreless extra frames, Hanley Ramírez hit a bases-loaded single in the bottom of the 12th to give Boston the win, 3–2. After a rare scheduled Friday off-day, Boston jumped out to an 8–2 lead after two innings of the series' second game, en route to a 10–3 victory. In the series' finale on Sunday, Tampa Bay held a 7–2 lead with two outs in the bottom of the eighth; Boston then had six consecutive hits (three singles and three doubles) to take the lead, 8–7. Craig Kimbrel pitched a one-two-three ninth, to give the Red Sox the sweep.
Red Sox won the series 3–0 (21–12 runs)

April 10–April 12, vs. New York Yankees
The Red Sox jumped out to an early lead, then added a nine-run sixth inning, to take the first game of the series, 14–1. The first third of the Boston batting order was a combined 8-for-10 with eight runs and nine RBIs. Boston's winning streak then ended at nine games in a 10–7 loss to Masahiro Tanaka on April 11. The game included an incident where Red Sox relief pitcher Joe Kelly hit Yankees' designated hitter Tyler Austin with a pitch, following an allegedly dirty slide by Austin in which he spiked fielder Brock Holt. Austin charged Kelly and started a bench-clearing brawl; four players, including Kelly and Austin, were ejected. Boston subsequently won the final game of the series, 6–3, with Rick Porcello allowing only two hits in seven shutout innings.
Red Sox won the series 2–1 (27–14 runs)

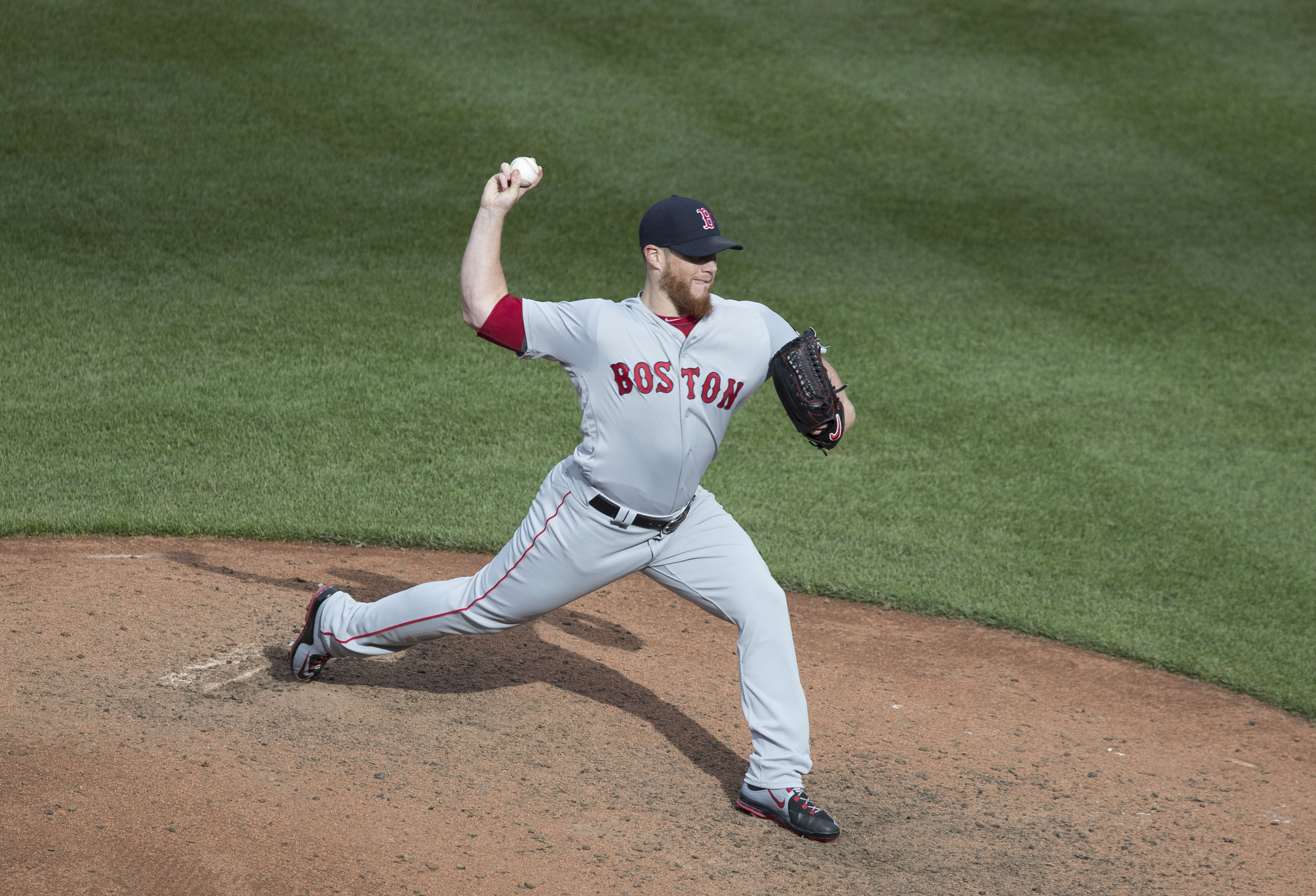
Craig Kimbrel had seven saves through the end of April.

April 13–April 15, vs. Baltimore Orioles
The Red Sox jumped out to a 4–1 lead in the first inning of the opening game of the series. Eduardo Rodríguez held the Orioles to one run in six innings, en route to a 7–3 win. Boston again took an early lead in the second game; 3–0 at the end of the first, and 8–0 at the end of the fourth. Héctor Velázquez got the win in the 10–3 victory. The third game of the series was tied 1–1 through five innings, with Boston getting the go-ahead run in the sixth on an error and wild pitch, and then an insurance run on a Tzu-Wei Lin ground rule double. Heath Hembree got the win in relief; final score 3–1. The final game of the series—set for Patriots' Day—was rained out and rescheduled for May 17.
Red Sox won the series 3–0 (20–7 runs)

April 17–April 19, at Los Angeles Angels
In the first game of the series, the Red Sox got three early runs off of Shohei Ohtani, who only lasted two innings. Boston added five more in the third, en route to a 10–1 win; Mookie Betts had three home runs. Boston again jumped out to an early lead in the second game; up 6–0 after three, starter Rick Porcello and the bullpen held Los Angeles scoreless, for a 9–0 victory. The final game of the series found Boston up a run, 3–2, at the end of five. The Red Sox then outscored the Angels 5–0 during the final four innings, for an 8–2 win to complete the sweep.
Red Sox won the series 3–0 (27–3 runs)

April 20–April 22, at Oakland Athletics
After a come-from-behind victory in the first game of the series, which extended Boston's winning streak to eight games, the Red Sox were no-hit by Sean Manaea on April 21. Entering the game with a 17–2 record, the Red Sox had the best winning percentage (.895) of any MLB team ever no-hit. It was the first no-hitter against the Red Sox since Chris Bosio of the Seattle Mariners on April 22, 1993. Boston also lost the third and final game of the series; it was the first time the team had consecutive losses during the season.
Red Sox lost the series 1–2 (8–10 runs)

April 24–April 26, at Toronto Blue Jays
In the first game of the series, the Red Sox rallied from a 3–1 deficit in the top of the ninth, and the game went to extra innings. In the bottom of the 10th inning, Curtis Granderson hit a one-out solo home run off of Craig Kimbrel to give the Blue Jays a 4–3 win, extending Boston's losing streak to three games. The Red Sox were able to win the final two games of the series, each by a single run with Kimbrel getting both saves, giving them six wins from their nine-game road trip.
Red Sox won the series 2–1 (12–11 runs)

April 27–April 29, vs. Tampa Bay Rays
After falling behind 4–0 in the first game of the series, the Red Sox rallied but came up a run short, losing 4–3 to the Rays. In the second game of the series, after playing to a 5–5 tie through five innings, the Red Sox gave up seven runs in the final four innings, losing 12–6, their fifth loss in seven games. Boston then won the final game of the series, 4–3.
Red Sox lost the series 1–2 (13–19 runs)

April 30, vs. Kansas City Royals
After giving up three first-inning runs, the Red Sox rallied to a 10–6 win in the opening game of the series. Four runs came on a Xander Bogaerts grand slam, making the 2018 Red Sox only the second team in MLB history, along with the 1996 Montreal Expos, to have six grand slams by May 1. The 19 wins the Red Sox had in April set a new club record; the prior mark was 18, most recently accomplished by the 2013 team.

May

=== May ===
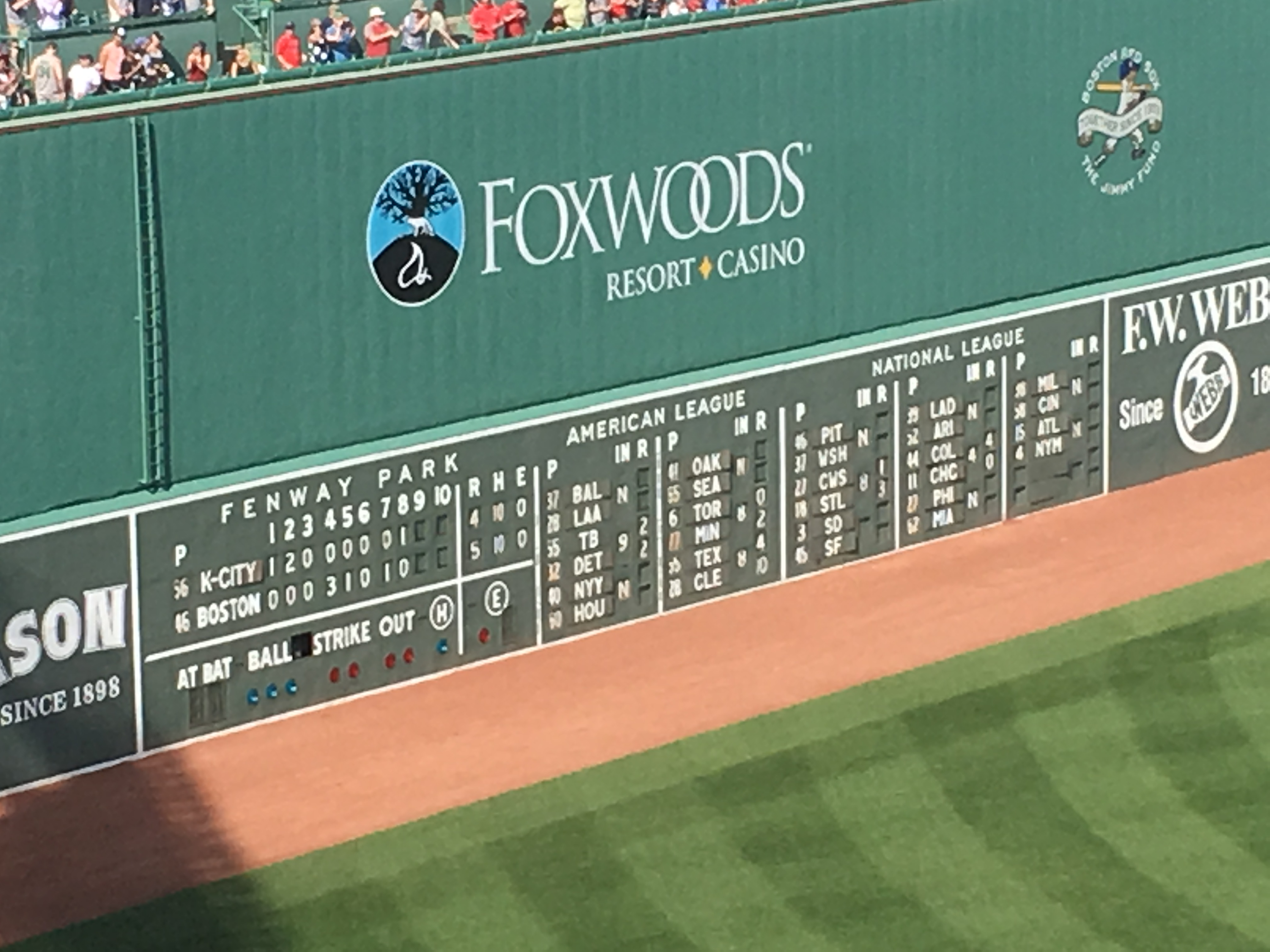
Scoreboard at the conclusion of the May 2 game

May 1–May 2, vs. Kansas City Royals (cont.)
A blown save by Craig Kimbrel, in giving up a ninth-inning home run to Alex Gordon, sent the second game of the series into extra innings. With the Red Sox down a run in the bottom of the 12th, a home run by Eduardo Núñez tied the game, 4–4. A three-run home run by Jorge Soler in the top of the 13th put the Royals up 7–4, and a Red Sox rally in the bottom of the inning came up a run short, the Royals winning 7–6. The Royals took an early 3–0 lead in the rubber match of the series but the Red Sox tied the game in the fourth with Mookie Betts and J. D. Martinez going yard. Betts then single-handedly won the game for Boston, by taking Danny Duffy deep two more times. This was Betts' fourth three-homer game of his young career, making him the Red Sox' franchise leader for such games, surpassing Ted Williams.
Red Sox won the series 2–1 (21–17 runs)

May 3–May 6, at Texas Rangers
In the series opener, David Price lasted only 3 2/3 innings while giving up nine runs (seven earned) as the Red Sox lost to the Rangers, 11–5. Mookie Betts followed up his three-homer game with a 2-for-4 effort at the plate, including his 12th home run of the season. In the second game of the series, Rick Porcello held the Rangers to three hits and one run in six innings, as the Red Sox won, 5–1. The Red Sox had four home runs; Betts (his fifth in three games), J. D. Martinez, and two by Rafael Devers. After falling behind 4–1 in the third game of the series, the Red Sox came back to win, 6–5, with Craig Kimbrel getting the save, the 300th of his MLB career. In the fourth and final game of the series, Chris Sale held the Rangers to four hits and one run in seven innings of work, en route to a 6–1 Red Sox victory.
Red Sox won the series 3–1 (22–18 runs)

May 8–May 10, at New York Yankees
In the opening game of the series, Boston outhit New York, 8–6, but the Yankees had two solo home runs from Giancarlo Stanton en route to a 3–2 win. It was the Yankees' ninth win in their last ten games, putting them into a tie with the Red Sox atop the AL East, with identical 25–10 records. In the second game of the series, after trailing 4–2 at the end of the third, the Red Sox held a 6–5 lead going into the bottom of the eighth. With runners on first and second with one out, Craig Kimbrel was brought in, for a potential five-out save. A triple by Brett Gardner, followed by an Aaron Judge two-run homer, put the Yankees ahead, 9–6. Aroldis Chapman pitched a scoreless ninth to give the Yankees the win, and first place in the AL East standings. In the final game of the series, the Red Sox held a 4–0 lead going into the bottom of the seventh, with Hanley Ramírez having contributed three RBIs. The Yankees loaded the bases with one out off of Heath Hembree, and were able to push across four runs to tie the game after Joe Kelly came in. The Red Sox re-took the lead in the top of the eighth, on a J. D. Martinez solo home run. Kelly then held the Yankees scoreless in the bottom of the eighth, and Craig Kimbrel pitched a one-two-three ninth, earning his tenth save of the season. The win put the Red Sox back into a tie with the Yankees for first place in the AL East, both teams at 26–11.
Red Sox lost the series 1–2 (13–16 runs)

May 11–May 13, at Toronto Blue Jays
In the first game of the series, Chris Sale became the third Boston pitcher, after Roger Clemens and Pedro Martínez, to have a game with 15 strikeouts while issuing no walks. Sale pitched nine innings of a game that would go 12 innings, with Toronto winning 5–3 on a two-run walk-off home run by Luke Maile off of Brian Johnson. In the second game of the series, David Price pitched 5 1/3 innings, giving up two runs and getting the win, after his scheduled start against the Yankees had been pushed back due to numbness in his throwing hand, which was subsequently diagnosed as a mild case of carpal tunnel syndrome. Hanley Ramírez had a two-run homer en route to a 5–2 Boston win. In the final game of the series, a first-inning two-run home run from J. D. Martinez put Boston ahead early. After starter Drew Pomeranz left with no outs in the fifth inning, the Red Sox bullpen allowed one inherited runner to score, and then held Toronto to no further runs through the end of the game. Joe Kelly picking up his second save of the season, in a Boston 5–3 victory.
Red Sox won the series 2–1 (13–10 runs)

May 14–May 16, vs. Oakland Athletics
The opening game of the series included five solo home runs; three by Oakland and two by Boston. The Red Sox trailed from the fourth inning on, ultimately losing 6–5. Rain delayed the start of the second game of the series by almost two hours. Oakland jumped out to a 2–0 lead in the first inning, and Boston closed the gap to 3–2 after five innings. The Athletics added two runs in the eighth, and although the Red Sox got one run in the ninth, closer Blake Treinen converted his second save in two days as the Athletics won, 5–3. In the third game of the series, Chris Sale handed over a 3–2 lead to the bullpen after five innings, due to a high pitch count (102). Boston again outscored Oakland 3–2 in the final four innings, for a 6–4 final.
Red Sox lost the series 1–2 (14–15 runs)

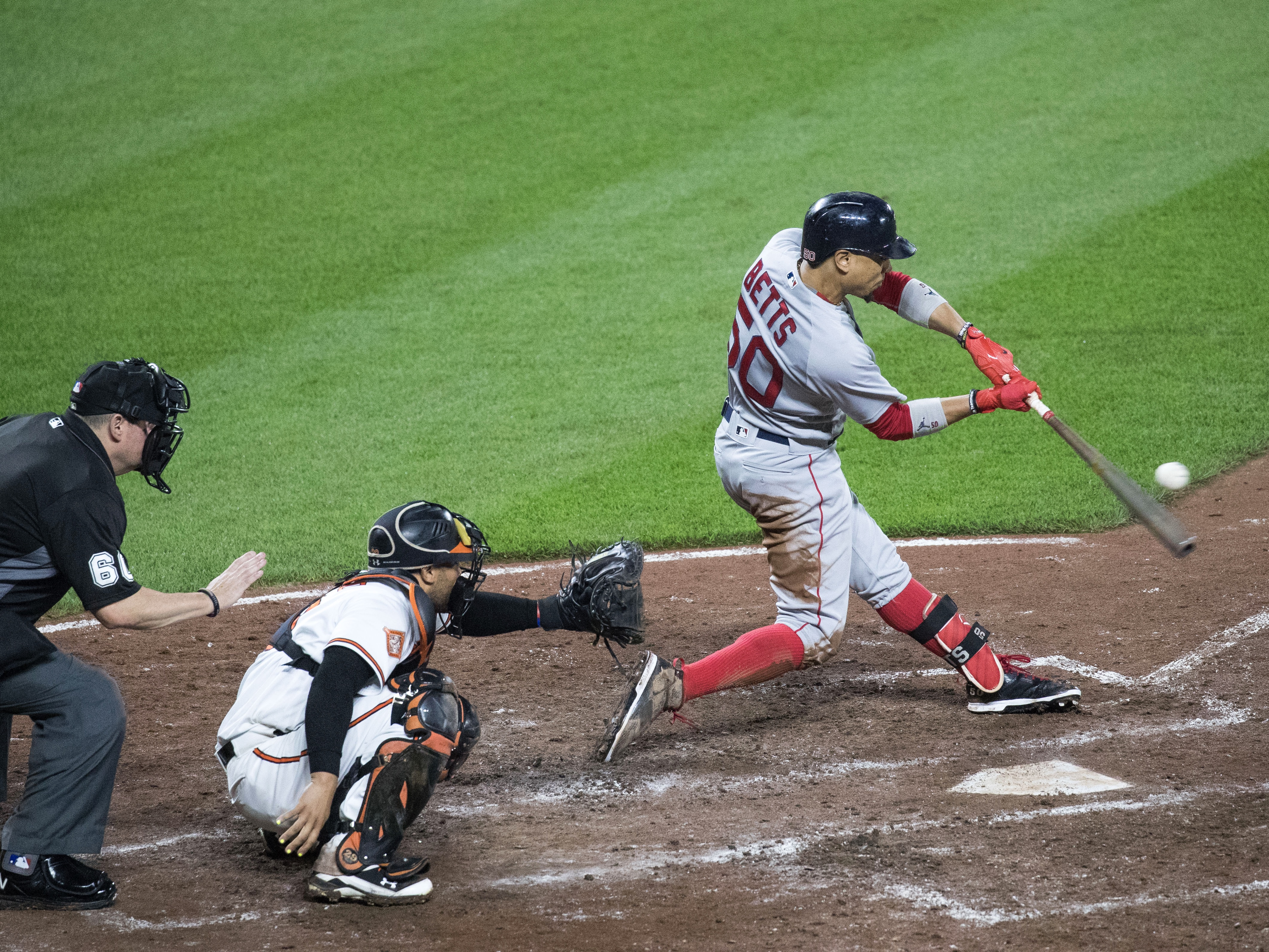
Mookie Betts hit his 15th home run of the season against Baltimore on May 19.

May 17–May 20, vs. Baltimore Orioles
David Price threw a 95-pitch complete game in the first game of the series, as the Red Sox won, 6–2. Baltimore's only runs came on a Manny Machado two-run homer with two outs in the ninth. With the win, the Red Sox became the first MLB team to reach 30 wins in the 2018 season. The second game of the series was tied at one in the top of the fourth with two outs, when Baltimore scored four runs off of Boston starter Drew Pomeranz. Despite a 3-for-5 effort from Mookie Betts, including his 14th home run of the season, the Red Sox could not make up the deficit; final score 7–4 for the Orioles. In the third game of the series, the Red Sox broke a 1–1 tie with three runs in the fifth inning, on back-to-back home runs from Betts (with Sandy León on base) and Andrew Benintendi. Craig Kimbrel earned his 13th save of the season in closing out the 6–3 victory. In the final game of the series, a pair of J. D. Martinez home runs helped lead Boston to a 5–0 win; the Orioles outhit the Red Sox, 13–12, but were unable to score as they had 14 men left on base.
Red Sox won the series 3–1 (21–12 runs)

May 22–May 24, at Tampa Bay Rays
In the first game of the series, Chris Sale pitched 7 2/3 innings while holding the Rays to two runs (one earned) while striking out nine and walking two. Mookie Betts and Rafael Devers both homered as the Red Sox won, 4–2. The second game of the series was tied 1–1 entering the ninth, when Boston pushed across three runs, aided by an error, walk, and passed ball by Tampa Bay. Closer Craig Kimbrel then retired the Rays in order for his 15th save of the season. Tampa Bay took the final game of the series, 6–3, as Rick Porcello gave up six runs (four earned) in 3 2/3 innings, requiring 92 pitches.
Red Sox won the series 2–1 (11–9 runs)

May 25–May 27, vs. Atlanta Braves
The series' first game was a 6–2 win for the Red Sox, powered by home runs from J. D. Martinez, Xander Bogaerts, Mookie Betts, and Mitch Moreland. Dustin Pedroia was on the active roster for the first time of the season, but did not play in the game. Earlier in the day, in order to open up a roster spot for Pedroia, the team announced that Hanley Ramírez had been designated for assignment. In the second game of the series, neither starting pitcher lasted four innings, and the two teams used a total of nine relief pitchers. Steven Wright was the most effective, pitching three innings of scoreless relief and picking up the win, as the Red Sox rallied from deficits of 3–0 and 5–3 to win, 8–6. Chris Sale had eight strikeouts in 4 1/3 innings of the final game of the series, but was roughed up for six runs by Atlanta, as Boston lost 7–1.
Red Sox won the series 2–1 (15–15 runs)

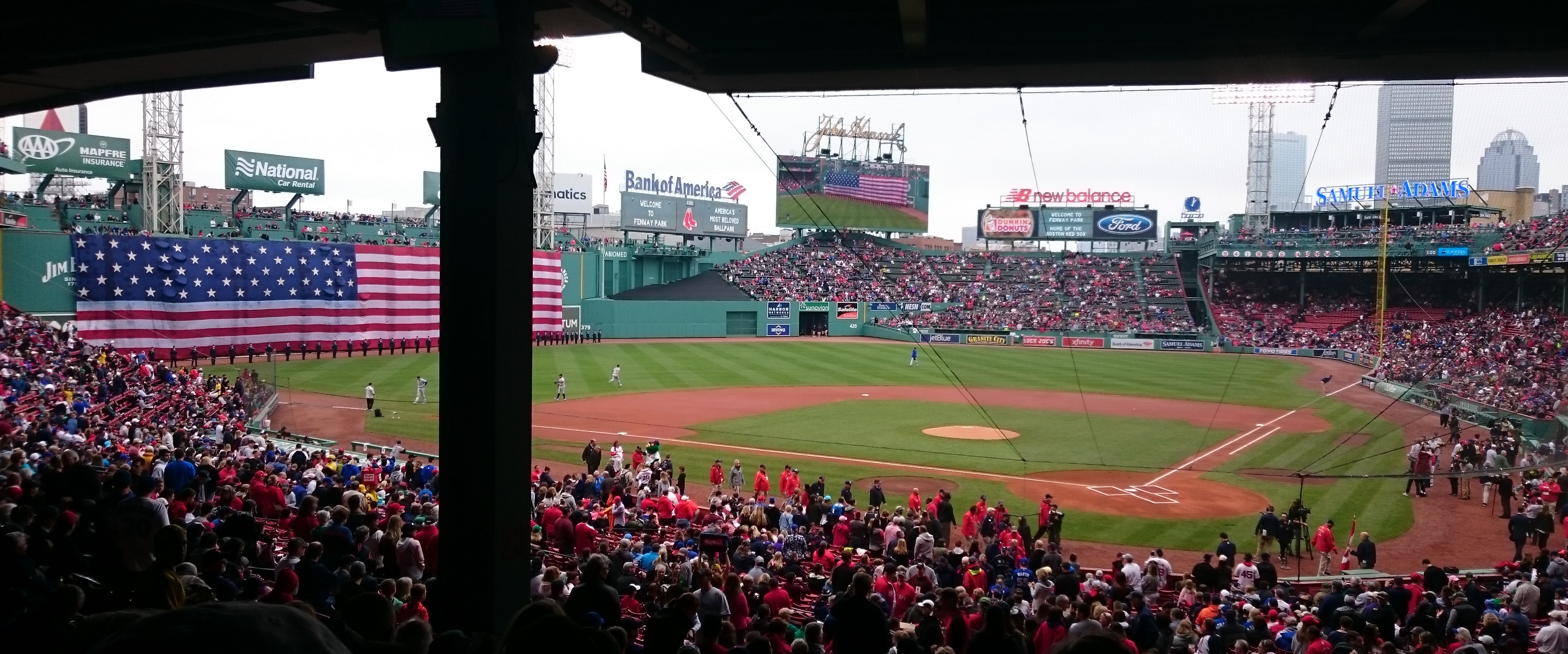
Memorial Day pregame ceremony on May 28

May 28–May 30, vs. Toronto Blue Jays
In the first game of the series, the Red Sox sent eight men to the plate in the bottom of the fourth, pushing across five runs on the way to an 8–3 victory. David Price gave up four hits and two runs over five innings, picking up the win as the bullpen allowed just one run through the final four innings. Andrew Benintendi had a 3-for-5-day with four RBIs, missing just a double to complete the cycle. The second game of the series also yielded an 8–3 Boston win, as the Red Sox scored in six of the eight innings they batted, including home runs from Benintendi and Sandy León. Rick Porcello improved his record to 7–2, and Craig Kimbrel notched his 17th save. Boston completed the sweep with a 6–4 win in the final game of the series. Toronto tied the game at two in the top of the sixth, and later rallied for two runs in the top of the ninth, before coming up short. J. D. Martinez hit his 18th home run of the 2018 season, putting him into a tie with Mike Trout of the Los Angeles Angels for the MLB lead in that category.
Red Sox won the series 3–0 (22–10 runs)

May 31, at Houston Astros
The Astros scored two first-innings runs on a Carlos Correa home run off of Drew Pomeranz en route to a 4–2 win in the first game of the series.

June

=== June ===
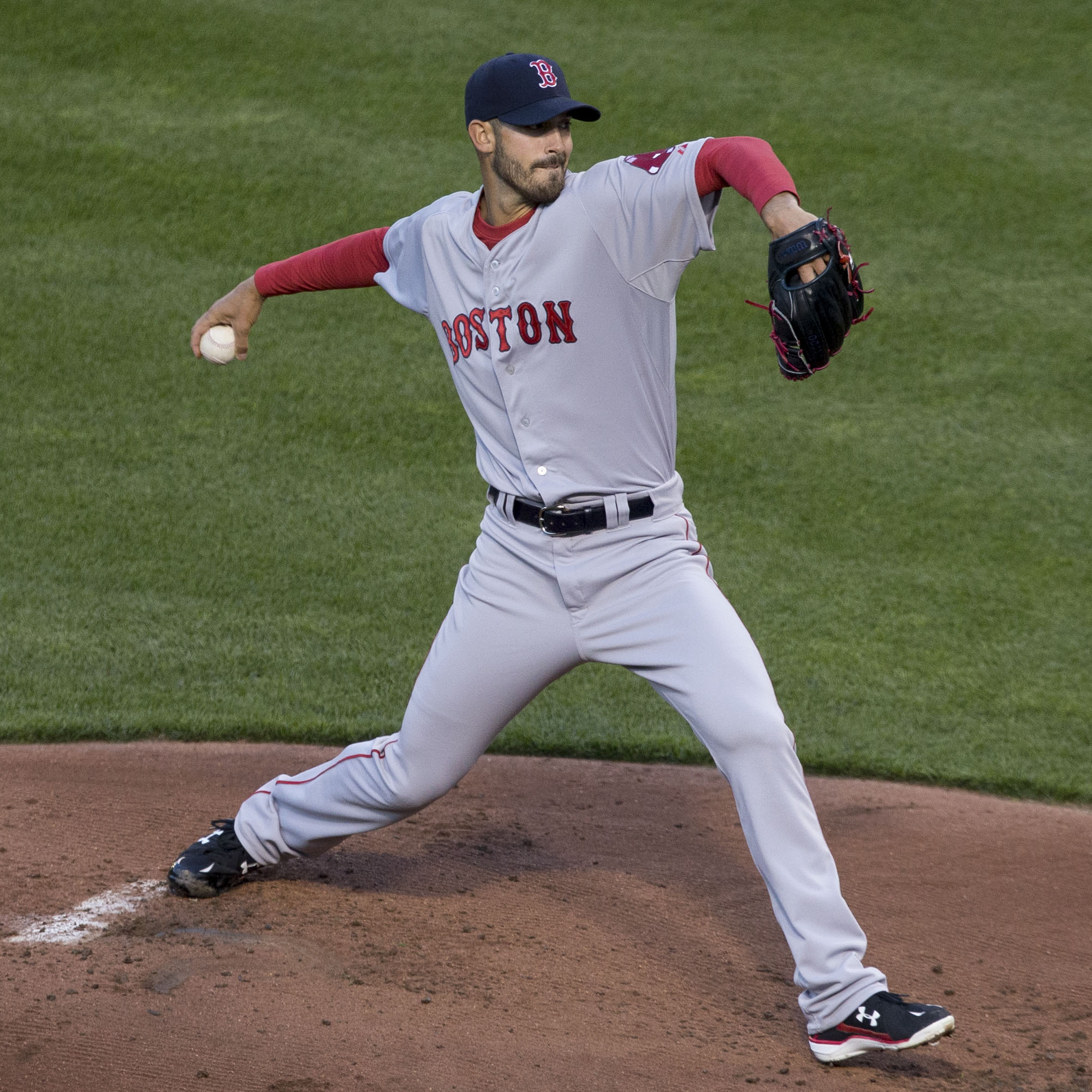
Rick Porcello's win on June 3 pushed his record to 8–2.

June 1–June 3, at Houston Astros (cont.)
In the second game of the series, Houston had home runs from George Springer, Carlos Correa, and Evan Gattis in their 7–3 win over Boston. J. D. Martinez had his 19th home run of the season, while Mookie Betts was placed on the 10-day disabled list. Trailing by a run entering the seventh inning of the third game of the series, the Red Sox rallied for three runs in the frame on the way to a 5–4 win. A two-run Andrew Benintendi homer provided the winning edge, while Dustin Pedroia was placed on the 10-day disabled list after appearing in only three games since making his season debut on May 26. In the closing game of the series, the Red Sox had 15 hits while Rick Porcello picked up his eighth win of the season in a 9–3 Boston victory. Brock Holt had three RBIs while Benintendi and Mitch Moreland both homered.
Red Sox split the series 2–2 (19–18 runs)

June 5–June 7, vs. Detroit Tigers
In the first game of the series, Steven Wright made a spot start, and pitched seven shutout innings to get the win. Xander Bogaerts and J. D. Martinez both had home runs in support of the 6–0 Boston victory; meanwhile, Drew Pomeranz was placed on the disabled list. Boston won the second game of the series, 7–1, as Andrew Benintendi and Christian Vázquez each had home runs; Vázquez went 3-for-4 with two RBIs and two runs scored. Jalen Beeks made his MLB debut as Red Sox starter in the third game of the series, yielding five first-inning runs to the Tigers, who went on to win, 7–2. Benintendi homered again for Boston, his 11th of the season.
Red Sox won the series 2–1 (15–8 runs)

June 8–June 10, vs. Chicago White Sox
Chris Sale pitched eight innings while striking out ten and allowing just one run in the opening game of the series, but the Red Sox were unable to score and fell to the White Sox, 1–0. In the middle game of the series, home runs from Jackie Bradley Jr. and J. D. Martinez led Boston to a 4–2 win, with David Price improving his record to 7–4. In the closing game, the White Sox held the Red Sox' offense in check, winning 5–2 and giving Chicago the series.
Red Sox lost the series 1–2 (6–8 runs)

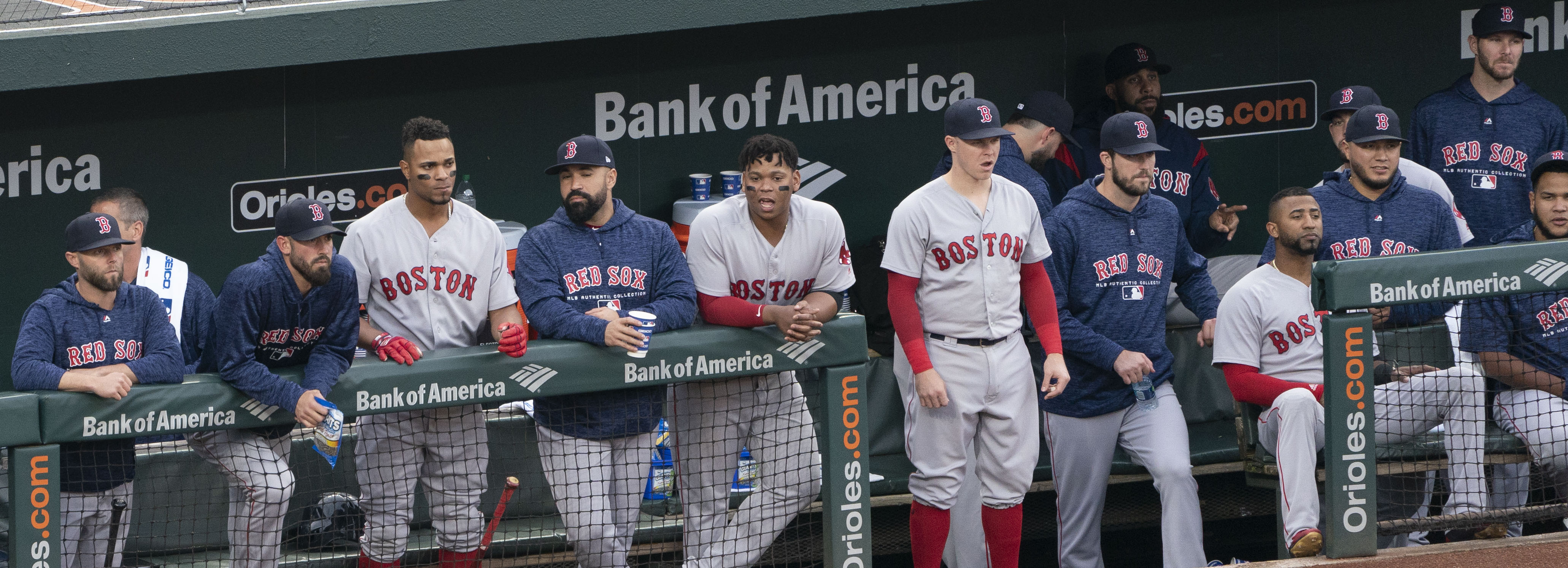
Red Sox dugout, June 11 in Baltimore

June 11–June 13, at Baltimore Orioles
Steven Wright shutout the Orioles for 6 2/3 innings, but neither team could score and the first game of the series went to extra innings. In the 12th inning, the Red Sox pushed across two runs on sacrifice flies, with Craig Kimbrel then closing out the win for his 21st save of the season. Mookie Betts returned from the disabled list, batted leadoff, and went 1-for-5. In the second game of the series, Eduardo Rodríguez improved his record to 8–1 with the win. Boston's 6–4 victory included home runs from Rafael Devers and Andrew Benintendi. The two teams combined for 20 hits and 16 walks in a game that took nearly four hours to complete. The Red Sox completed the sweep with a 5–1 win in the third game of the series; Chris Sale was the winning pitcher while Betts and J. D. Martinez both homered.
Red Sox won the series 3–0 (13–5 runs)

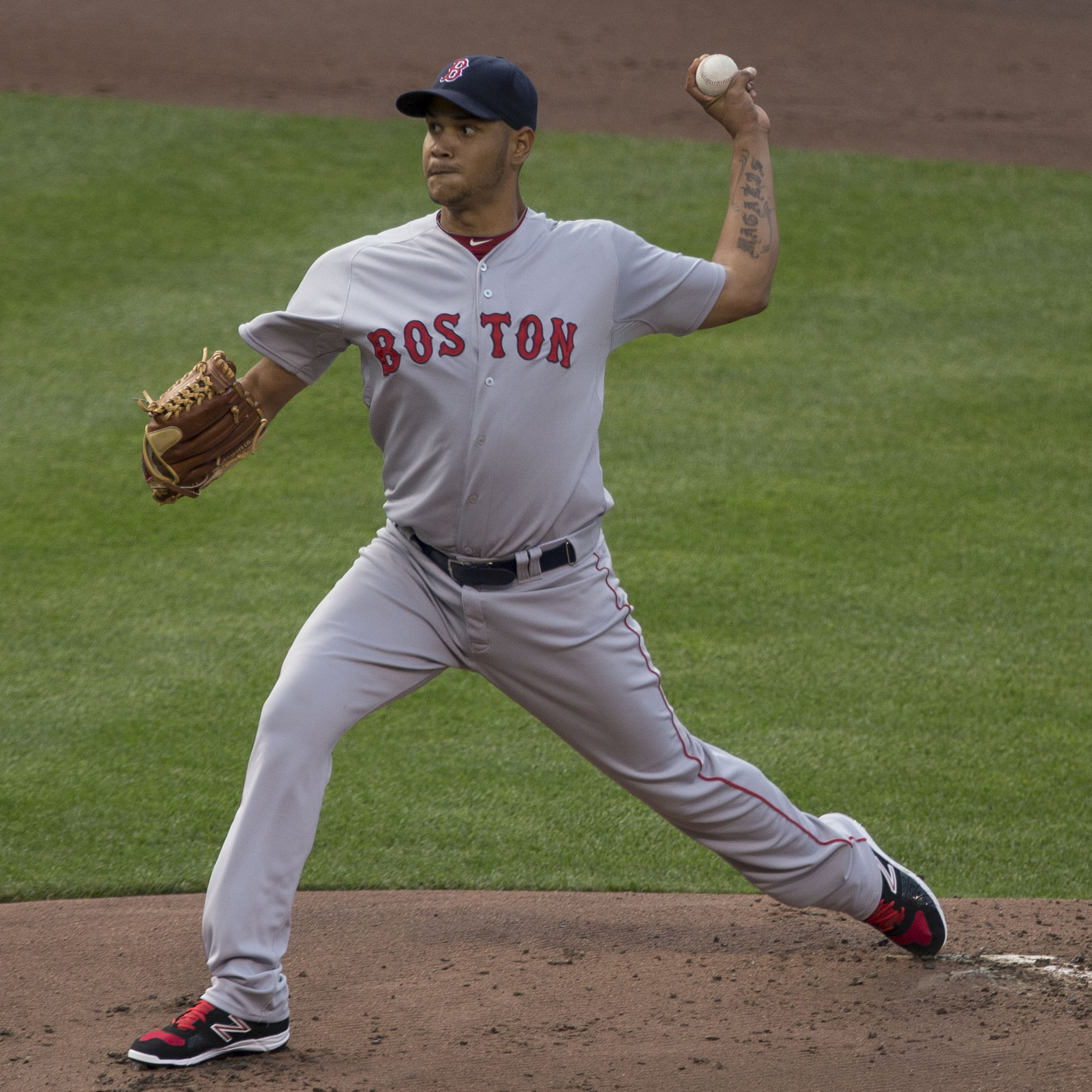
Eduardo Rodríguez's record stood at 9–1 after his win on June 17.

June 14–June 17, at Seattle Mariners
In the series' opening game, starters David Price and Félix Hernández both went seven innings, with the Red Sox holding a 2–1 lead thanks to a sixth-inning home run by Xander Bogaerts. Neither bullpen allowed a run, with Red Sox closer Craig Kimbrel issuing two walks but getting his 22nd save of the season. In the second game of the series, Rick Porcello pitched six innings and left with the Red Sox ahead, 6–4. However, Seattle scored three runs off of the Boston bullpen, for a 7–6 win. All the Red Sox' runs came in the third inning, when they sent 11 men to the plate. Steven Wright, starter of the third game of the series, held Seattle to one run through seven innings, but Boston was limited to two hits and unable to score, as the Red Sox fell 1–0 to the Mariners. In the final game of the series, Boston jumped out to a 5–0 lead in the third inning and never looked back, winning 9–3. Eduardo Rodríguez notched his ninth win of the season, while Bogaerts, Jackie Bradley Jr., and Rafael Devers each homered.
Red Sox split the series 2–2 (17–12 runs)

June 19–June 21, at Minnesota Twins
The first game of the series was tied 2–2 going to the bottom of the eighth inning; the Twins then scored four runs—two each off of Robby Scott and Joe Kelly—as the Red Sox fell, 6–2. In the second game of the series, the Red Sox were held to one run on four hits, while the Twins were powered by home runs from Robbie Grossman and Max Kepler, defeating Boston, 4–1. After being held to three runs in the first two games of the series, the Red Sox offense produced 16 hits and won the final game, 9–2. Rick Porcello improved his record to 9–3, while Mookie Betts and Andrew Benintendi both homered.
Red Sox lost the series 1–2 (12–12 runs)

June 22–June 24, vs. Seattle Mariners
The opening game of the series saw nine runs scored in the first inning, and Seattle led 10–5 entering the fifth inning. Boston outscored Seattle 9–0 the rest of the way, for a 14–10 win. Red Sox starter Steven Wright gave up ten earned runs—raising his season ERA from 1.23 to 3.38—but escaped with a no decision. Nelson Cruz of the Mariners had two home runs and seven RBIs in a losing effort. For the Red Sox, J. D. Martinez went 4-for-5 with a home run and five RBIs, and every batter had at least one hit. In the second game of the series, Seattle again jumped out to an early lead, 5–0 after four innings. This time, there would be no Boston comeback, as it was 7–0 going to the ninth, with the Red Sox only scoring two late runs. Eduardo Rodríguez took the loss, his first since May 15, and only his second of the season. In the closing game of the series, Chris Sale had 13 strikeouts while holding Seattle scoreless through seven innings. The Red Sox bullpen completed the shutout, while Mitch Moreland homered in support of the 5–0 win.
Red Sox won the series 2–1 (21–17 runs)

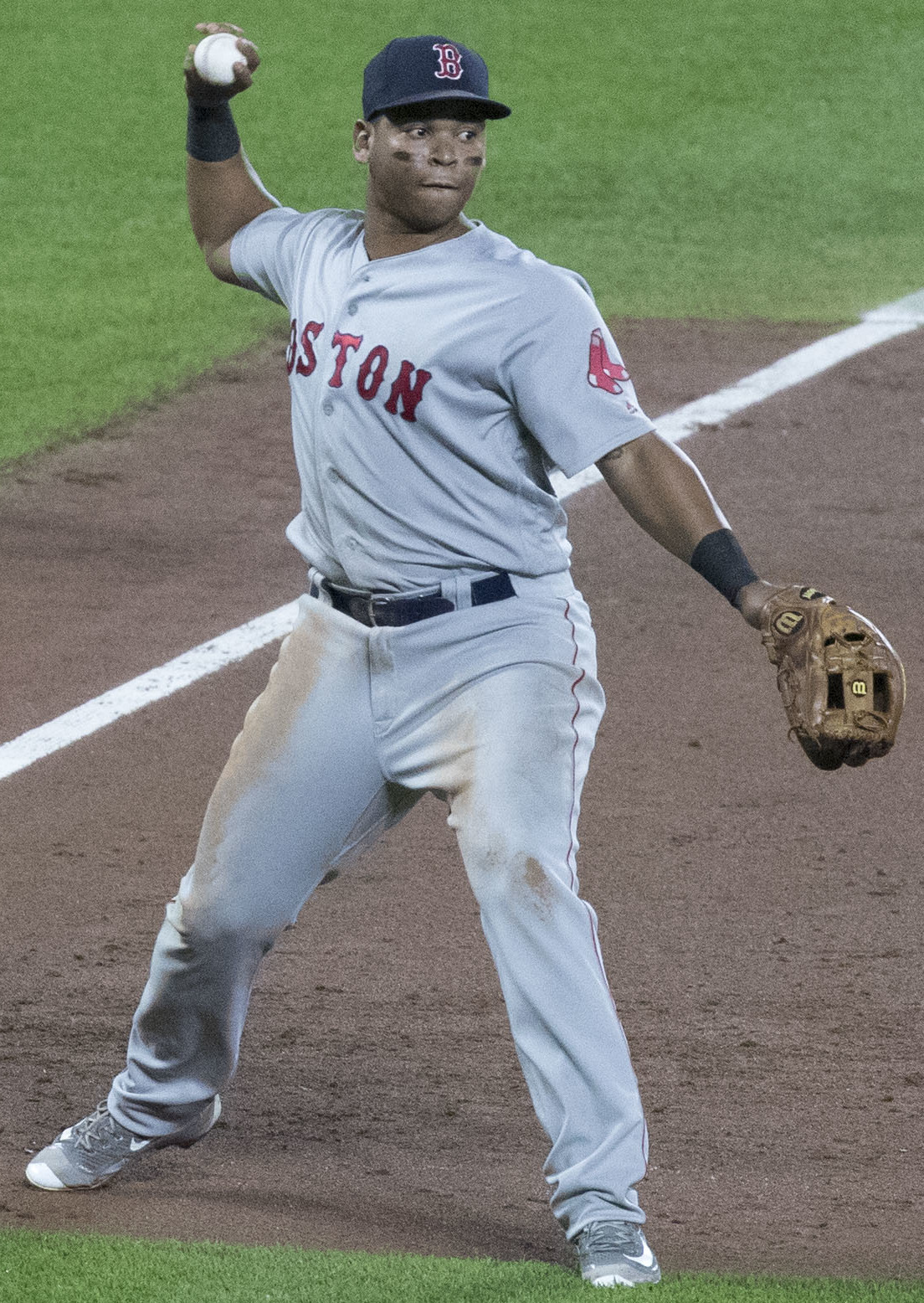
Rafael Devers was 5-for-5, including a grand slam, on June 30.

June 26–June 28, vs. Los Angeles Angels
In the series' first game, Boston had a 5–0 lead after two innings and went on to win, 9–1. David Price improved his record to 9–5, while Mookie Betts, Jackie Bradley Jr., Christian Vázquez, and J. D. Martinez each homered. In the second game of the series, the Red Sox jumped out to a 6–0 lead in the second inning. The Angels fought back to tie it, 6–6, in the seventh, with Boston then scoring three unanswered runs for a 9–6 victory. The two teams used a combined 12 pitchers, with Angels reliever Jake Jewell leaving the game after an apparent ankle injury suffered while trying to make a play at the plate. The Red Sox had home runs from Martinez, Sandy León, and Eduardo Núñez. In the series' final game, Brian Johnson started and left after four innings with the Red Sox trailing, 1–0. Héctor Velázquez then pitched two scoreless innings as Boston took the lead, 2–1, and was credited with the win as the Red Sox stayed ahead for a 4–2 final. Craig Kimbrel got his second consecutive save, bringing his season total to 24. Bradley Jr. and Rafael Devers both homered, as Boston completed the sweep. For the first time in franchise history, the Red Sox swept a season series of 5 or more games and also set a major league record of 20 home run against a single opponent with 6 or fewer games played against in a season.
Red Sox won the series 3–0 (22–9 runs)

June 29–June 30, at New York Yankees
In the first game of the series, New York built a 5–0 lead after four innings, en route to an 8–1 win. Boston starter Eduardo Rodríguez gave up five runs in six innings, taking the loss. The Yankees had four home runs, including two by Greg Bird, while new Red Sox 1B/OF Steve Pearce was 2-for-4 in his debut game with the team. In the middle game of the series, a first-inning grand slam from Rafael Devers put Boston up early, in a game they would go on to win, 11–0. Devers was 5-for-5 at the plate, lacking only a triple for the cycle. Sandy León also homered for the Red Sox, while Chris Sale improved his record to 8–4.

July

=== July ===
July 1, at New York Yankees (cont.)
In the third and final game of the series, the Yankees jumped on David Price early, scoring six first-inning runs. Price went 3 1/3 innings, allowing five homers and eight runs. The Yankees had six home runs, including three from Aaron Hicks, as they defeated Boston, 11–1.
Red Sox lost the series 1–2 (13–19 runs)

July 2–July 4, at Washington Nationals
In the opening game of the series, Rick Porcello drove in three runs with a bases-loaded double in the second inning; he pitched six innings, limiting the Nationals to two runs on seven hits, and got the win, his tenth of the season. Boston's other run in the 4–3 final came on a Mookie Betts home run, with Craig Kimbrel notching his 25th save of the season. In the second game of the series, the Red Sox had a pair of three-run home runs from Eduardo Núñez and Xander Bogaerts, plus a two-run shot from J. D. Martinez, en route to an 11–4 win. On Independence Day, the third game of the series was scoreless through six innings, until Boston score twice in the seventh and once in the ninth, for a 3–0 victory to complete the sweep. Jackie Bradley Jr. had two RBIs, while Eduardo Rodríguez captured his 10th win of the season.
Red Sox won the series 3–0 (18–7 runs)

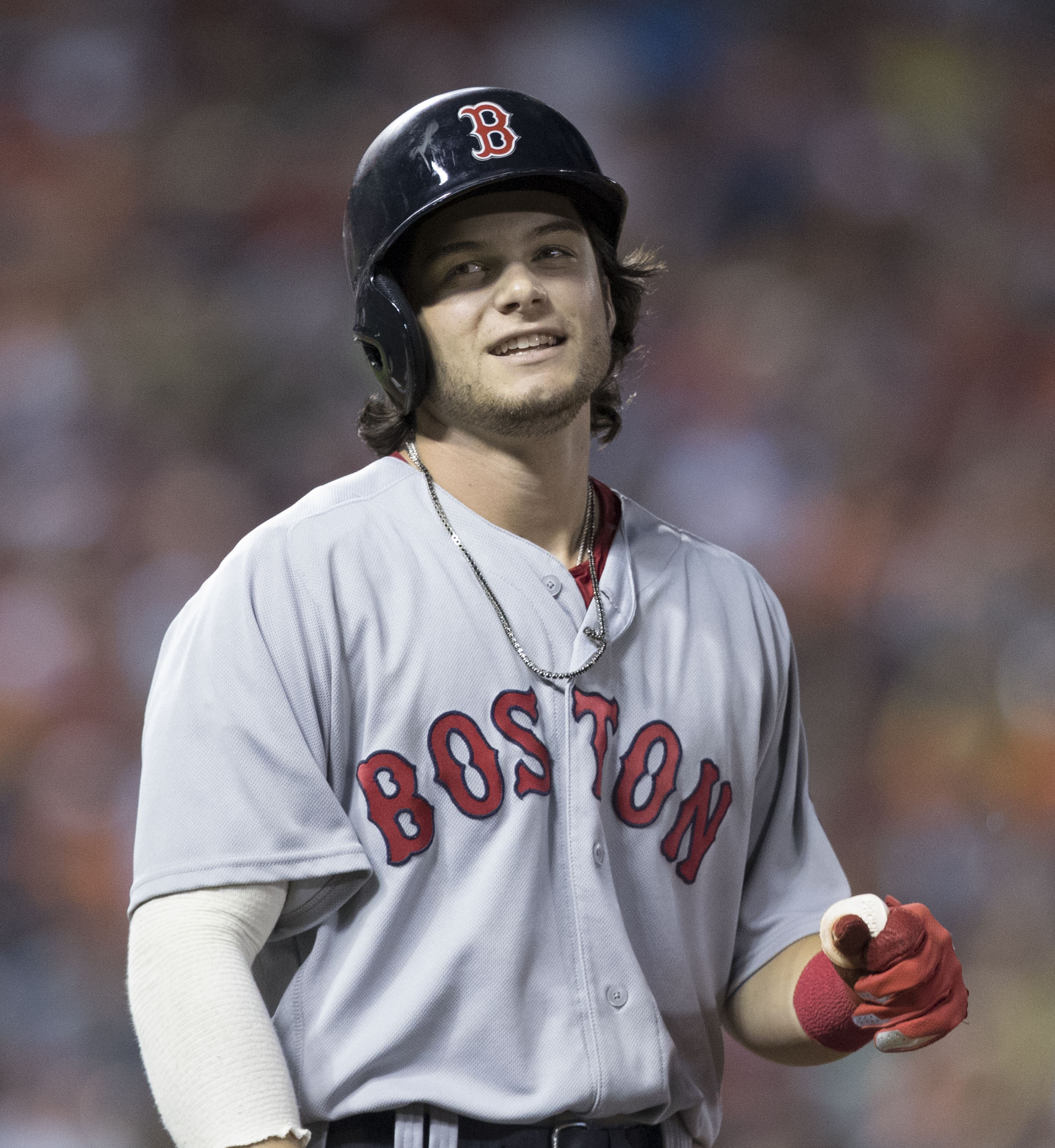
Andrew Benintendi went 8-for-11 with seven runs scored in the July 6–8 three-game series.

July 6–July 8, at Kansas City Royals
In the series opener, the Red Sox scored four runs in the first, and another four in the second, jumping out early in what would be a 10–5 win. Mookie Betts, J. D. Martinez, and Xander Bogaerts each homered, while Chris Sale improved his record to 9–4. Tyler Thornburg, acquired by Boston in December 2016 and out for the 2017 season due to surgery, made his Red Sox debut. The second game of the series was tied at four after five innings; the Red Sox then outscored the Royals 11–0, with Royals catcher Drew Butera facing six batters to record the final Boston out in the ninth, for a 15–4 final. Andrew Benintendi had a home run and a double, going 2-for-2 along with four walks, batting behind Betts who went 4-for-6. David Price had a no decision, leaving after 4 2/3 innings, with Heath Hembree picking up the win after pitching 1 1/3 hitless innings in relief. In the final game of the series, Rick Porcello allowed nine hits in seven innings, but held the Royals to three runs and got the win, improving his season record to 11–3. Boston's three-run seventh inning was the difference in the 7–4 final score. Benintendi was 4-for-5 at the plate, while Craig Kimbrel recorded his 27th save of the year.
Red Sox won the series 3–0 (32–13 runs)

July 9–July 11, vs. Texas Rangers
The Red Sox' winning streak was extended to seven games with a 5–0 victory in the opening game of the series. Boston's runs came on a Steve Pearce two-run homer in the first, and a J. D. Martinez three-run homer in the eighth. Eduardo Rodríguez improved his record to 11–3 for the season. In the middle game of the series, the Red Sox sent nine men to the plate in a five-run third inning, and won again, 8–4. Boston used six pitchers in the game, with reliever Matt Barnes getting the win; Héctor Velázquez, making a spot start, left after three innings. A 4–2 Boston win in the final game of the series completed the sweep, with Chris Sale improving his record to 10–4 for the season. Xander Bogaerts was 3-for-4 at the plate including a triple.
Red Sox won the series 3–0 (17–6 runs)

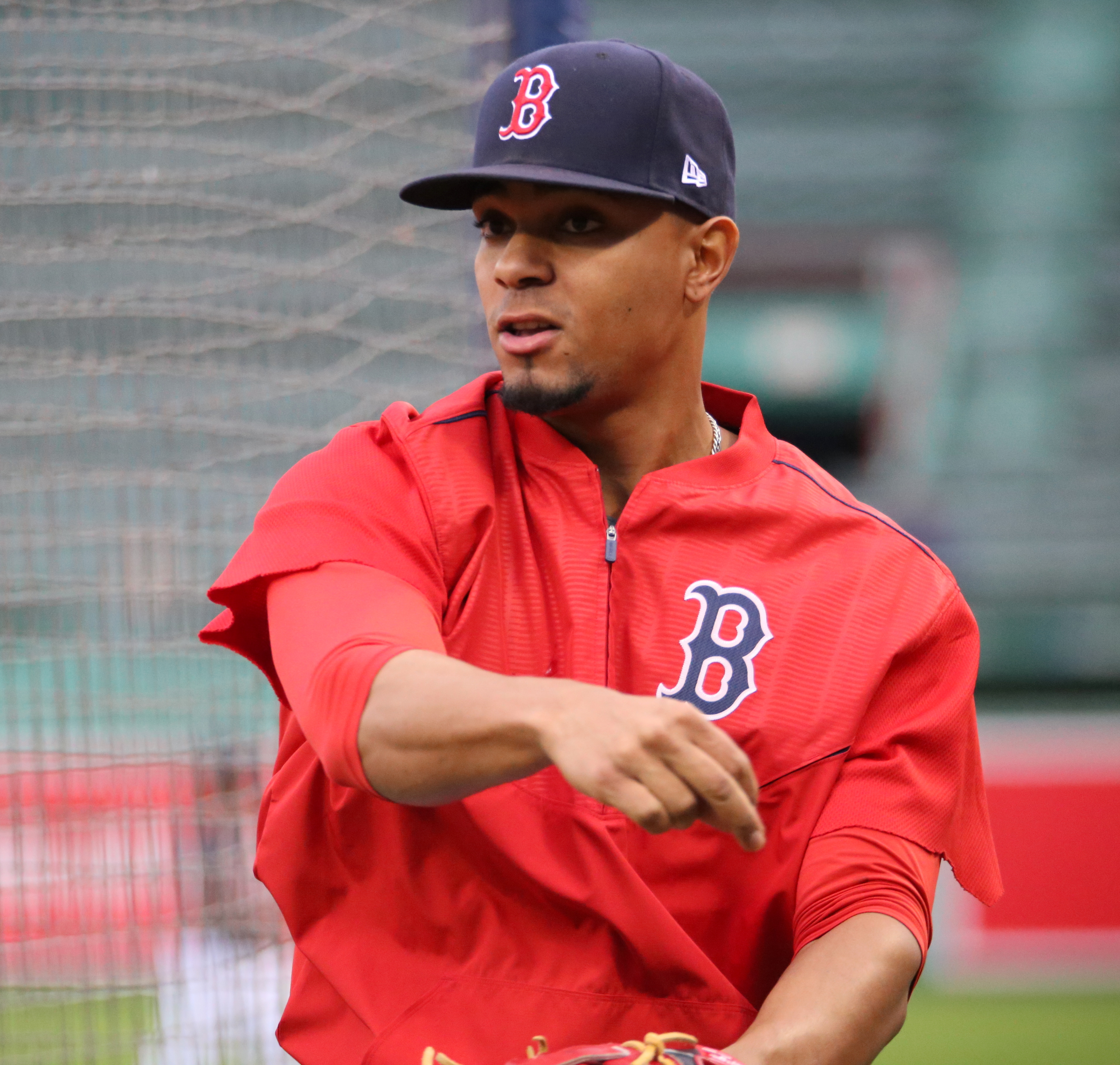
Xander Bogaerts hit his third grand slam of the season on July 14.

July 12–July 15, vs. Toronto Blue Jays
In the opener of a four-game series, Boston scored all but one of their runs in the fourth inning as they defeated Toronto, 6–4, extending their winning streak to ten games. Mookie Betts hit the team's eighth grand slam of the season, in a 13-pitch at bat—a full count plus seven pitches fouled off—as he went 2-for-4 with five RBIs. With a 66–29 record, the Red Sox reached 37 games over .500 for the first time since 1949. Boston's winning streak came to an end in the second game of the series, a 13–7 loss to Toronto. The two teams used a total of 13 pitchers, as both starters only retired a combined 15 batters. Betts was 3-for-4 at the plate—raising his average to .357 for the season—along with a walk, two RBIs, and two runs scored. The third game of the series went to extra innings, after Boston scored the tying run in the bottom of the ninth on back-to-back doubles by Xander Bogaerts and Jackie Bradley Jr. In the bottom of the tenth, the Red Sox loaded the bases on an error, a single, and an intentional walk. Bogaerts then hit a walk-off grand slam to win the game, 6–2. It was Bogaerts' third grand slam of the season and the Red Sox' ninth. Boston won the final game of series, 5–2, with Bogaerts again homering and Craig Kimbrel getting his 30th save of the season. The Red Sox reached the All-Star break with MLB's best record (68–30, a .694 winning percentage) and a 4 1/2 game lead over the Yankees in the AL East.
Red Sox won the series 3–1 (24–21 runs)

July 17, All-Star Game at Nationals Park

In an 8–6 American League win in 10 innings, four of the five Red Sox all-stars played in the game. Mookie Betts started in right field and was 0-for-3 at the plate, while J. D. Martinez started at DH and was 1-for-2. Chris Sale was the AL starting pitcher, striking out one and allowing one hit in an inning of work. Mitch Moreland was 2-for-3 after entering the game at first base. Closer Craig Kimbrel did not play.

July 20–July 22, at Detroit Tigers
The one and only run in the first game of the series came in the top of the first inning, when Steve Pearce drove in Andrew Benintendi. It was the Red Sox' first 1–0 win since the second game of the season. David Price pitched 6 1/3 scoreless innings for the win, with Craig Kimbrel getting the save. Boston fell to Detroit in the second game of the series, 5–0, despite outhitting the Tigers, 8–7. Starter Brian Johnson took the loss, although both runs he allowed in five innings of work were unearned. The Red Sox won the series' final game, 9–1, with Jackie Bradley Jr. going 2-for-4 with three RBIs, while Chris Sale improved his record to 11–4.
Red Sox won the series 2–1 (10–6 runs)

July 23–July 24, at Baltimore Orioles
A 5–3 win in the first game of the series gave Boston a 71–31 record, reaching 40 games over .500 for the first time since their 1949 season. Rick Porcello pitched six scoreless innings for the win, while Mitch Moreland hit his 12th home run of the season. For the second game of the series, the Red Sox activated Drew Pomeranz from the disabled list; he took the mound for the first time since May 31. Pomeranz allowed four runs in 4 2/3 innings, taking the loss as Baltimore prevailed, 7–6. Trailing 7–3 after five innings, Boston scored twice in the eighth and once in the ninth to nearly force extra innings. J. D. Martinez had two home runs, increasing his total to 31 for the season; Blake Swihart and Mookie Betts had one each. The third and final game of the series was postponed, due to rain. The Red Sox had jumped out to a 5–0 lead—including home runs from Betts, Martinez, and Andrew Benintendi—in two innings of play before the game was halted; however, those statistics are discarded, as the game will be replayed from the start.
Red Sox split the series 1–1 (11–10 runs)

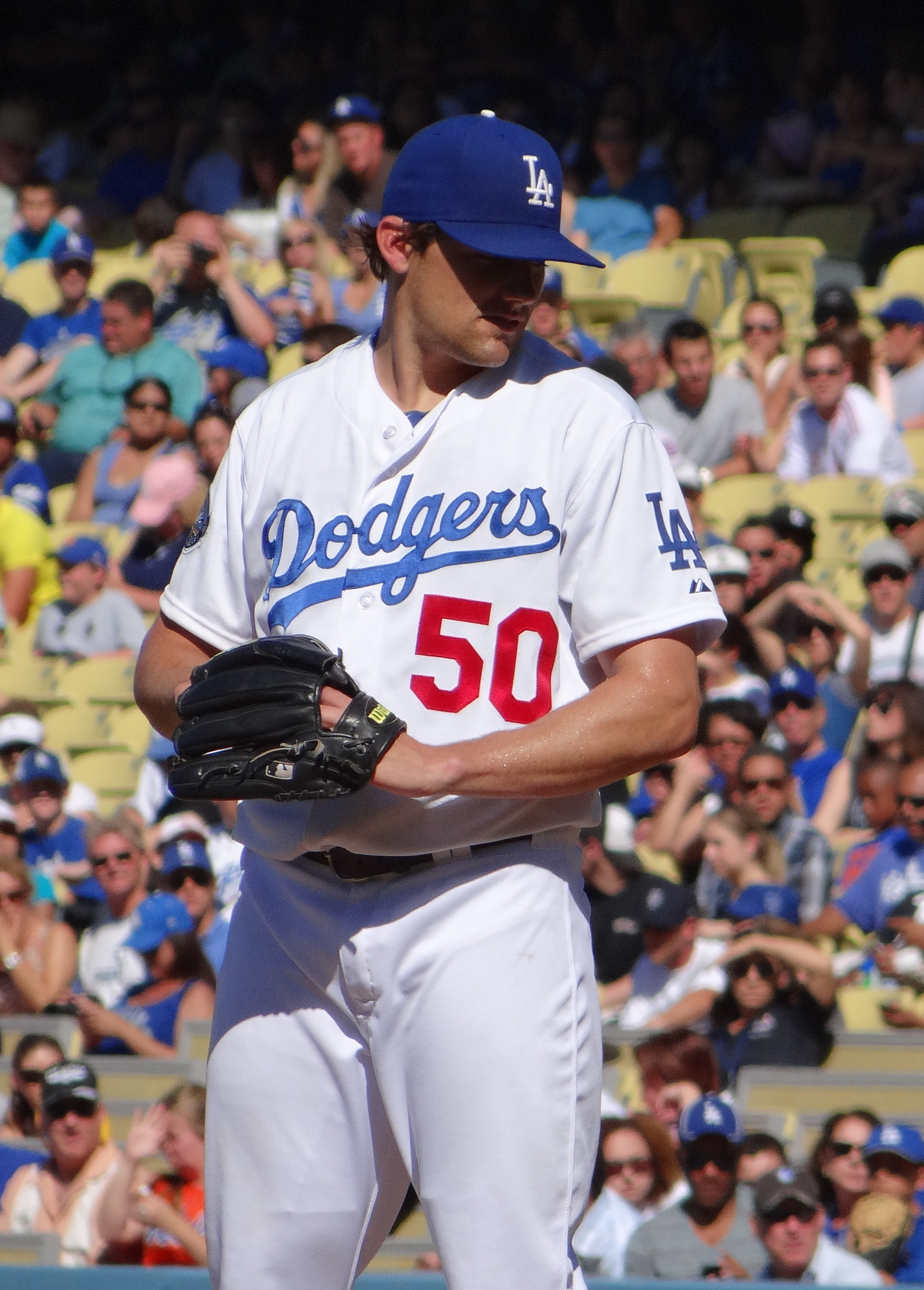
Nathan Eovaldi, seen here in 2012, got the win in his Boston debut on July 29.

July 26–July 29, vs. Minnesota Twins
Minnesota won the first game of the series, 2–1, with two late runs after Boston had gone out to a 1–0 lead in the second inning. The Red Sox threatened in the bottom of the ninth, loading the bases with two outs, with Twins closer Fernando Rodney striking out Jackie Bradley Jr. to complete the save. In the second game of the series, Boston took a 2–0 lead in the fifth inning via a Bradley Jr. home run. The Twins got back one run in the seventh, and then scored two runs off of closer Craig Kimbrel with two outs in the ninth, to take a 3–2 lead. Rafael Devers forced extra innings with a home run in the bottom of the ninth, and Mookie Betts opened the bottom of the tenth with a walk-off home run, giving the Red Sox a 4–3 win. Boston won the third game of the series, 10–4, with Rick Porcello improving his record to 13–4 for the year. Five Red Sox batters had two hits each, including J. D. Martinez who hit his 32nd home run of the season. Boston won the final game of the series, 3–0, with Martinez going 2-for-4 and driving in all three runs. Recently acquired starting pitcher Nathan Eovaldi made his Red Sox debut, allowing four hits in seven innings while striking out five and issuing no walks.
Red Sox won the series 3–1 (18–9 runs)

July 30–July 31, vs. Philadelphia Phillies
The first game of the series was tied 1–1 at the end of five innings, with no further scoring until the bottom of the 13th, when Blake Swihart drove in Eduardo Núñez for a 2–1 victory. All of Boston's hits came from the bottom four spots in the order, which went a collective 7-for-19. Philadelphia won the second and final game of the series, 3–1. Newly acquired second baseman Ian Kinsler made his Red Sox debut and went 1-for-4. Xander Bogaerts drove in Swihart for Boston's only run.
Red Sox split the series 1–1 (3–4 runs)

August

=== August ===
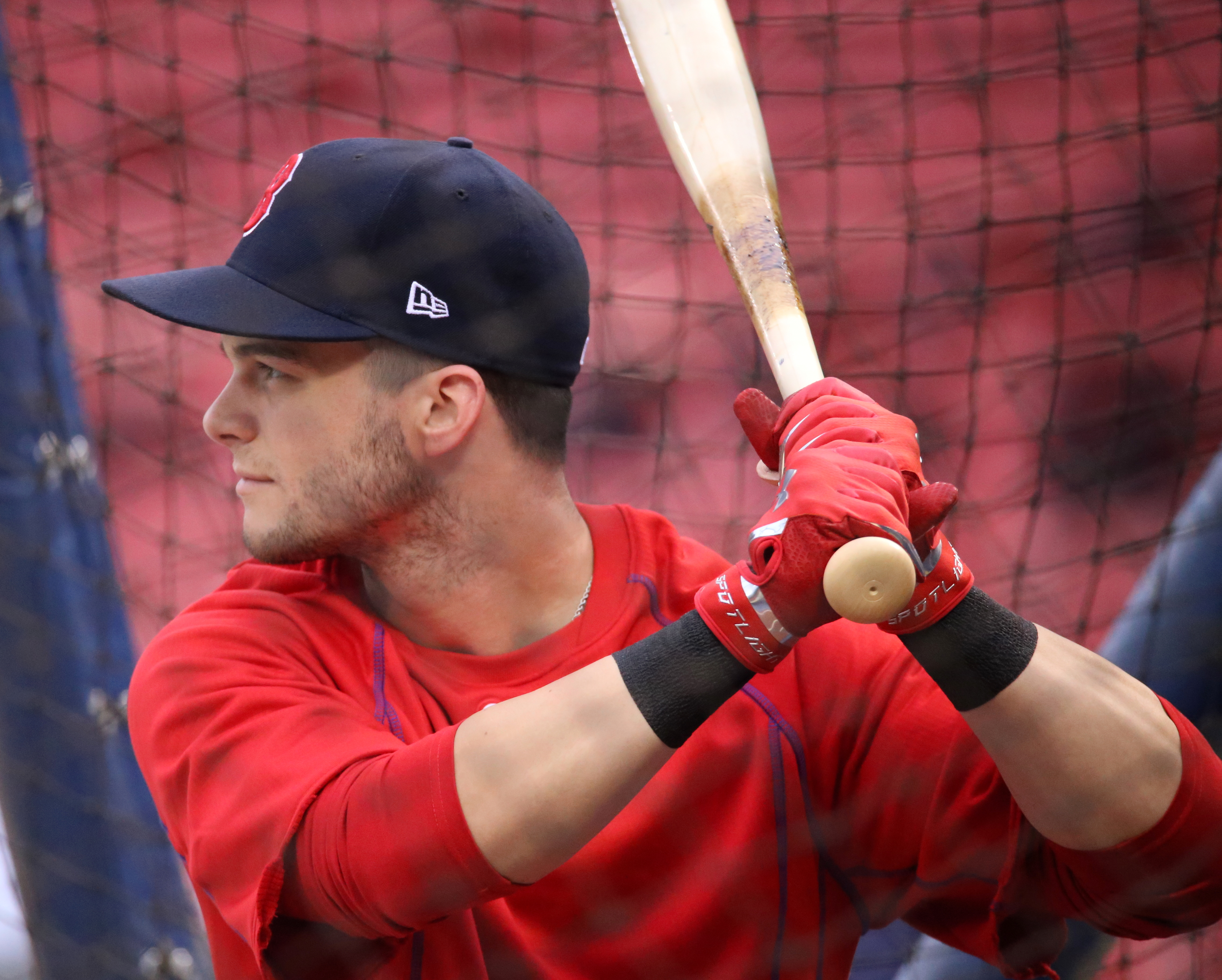
Andrew Benintendi's extra-inning RBI in the fourth game of the series completed the Red Sox' sweep of the Yankees.

August 2–August 5, vs. New York Yankees
In the first game of the four game set, the Yankees jumped out to an early 4–0 lead, only to see Boston score the next 10 runs, including eight in the fourth inning, en route to a 15–7 final. Much of the offense came from the top third of the Red Sox order: Mookie Betts was 4-for-4 plus two walks, Andrew Benintendi was 3-for-6 with three RBIs, and Steve Pearce was 3-for-5 with six RBIs; all three of his hits were home runs. Pearce joined Kevin Millar and Mo Vaughn as the only Red Sox players to have a three-homer game against the Yankees. In the second game of the series, Rick Porcello allowed only one run and one hit in a complete game effort, improving his record to 14–4 as the Red Sox won, 4–1. Alex Cora had been ejected in the bottom of the first inning, his first ejection as Boston manager, after taking exception to warnings issued to both dugouts. Boston then scored three runs, with two coming on a Pearce homer. Ian Kinsler had to leave the game due to injury, and was later placed on the disabled list; Betts replaced him at second base for several innings, his first time playing the position since 2014. Boston won the third game of the series, 4–1, with Nathan Eovaldi allowing no runs and three hits in eight innings. Mitch Moreland and J. D. Martinez both hit home runs. The Red Sox completed the four-game sweep in a 10-inning, 5–4 win that was broadcast on Sunday Night Baseball. A Betts solo home run put Boston ahead in the fifth inning; however, New York capitalized on a Xander Bogaerts error in the seventh inning to go ahead, 4–1. With that score, Yankees closer Aroldis Chapman came on in the bottom of the ninth, but struggled, striking out two and walking three. With the bases loaded, a Martinez single cut the lead to 4–3. A Bogaerts grounder then drew an errant throw from Yankees third baseman Miguel Andújar, allowing Jackie Bradley Jr. to score the tying run. The game went to extra innings after Moreland struck out, with Matt Barnes retiring the side in order in the top of the 10th. In the bottom of the 10th, Sandy León hit a two-out single and advanced to second on a wild pitch. Betts was intentionally walked, and Tony Renda made his Red Sox debut as a pinch runner for León. Benintendi then singled to center, scoring Renda, to secure the win and complete the sweep.
Red Sox won the series 4–0 (28–13 runs)

August 7–August 9, at Toronto Blue Jays
The first game of the series found Toronto leading, 3–1, when Boston scored four in the top of the eighth, including three on a J. D. Martinez home run, to take a 5–3 lead. Toronto then forced extra innings, with a run each in the bottom of the eighth and ninth innings. In the top of the tenth, Boston scored five runs, via homers by Mitch Moreland and Jackie Bradley Jr. Toronto could only answer with two runs, for a 10–7 final and fifth consecutive Red Sox win. In the series' second game, Boston jumped out to a 4–0 lead after three innings, ultimately winning 10–5. Rafael Devers hit a home run in his first game back from the disabled list. Boston's winning streak then ended at six games, as Toronto won the final game of the series, 8–5. Rick Porcello gave up seven runs in four innings, taking the loss. Martinez hit his 35th home run of the season, while Mookie Betts' ninth inning homer completed the cycle, the first of his career and first of the 2018 MLB season.
Red Sox won the series 2–1 (25–20 runs)

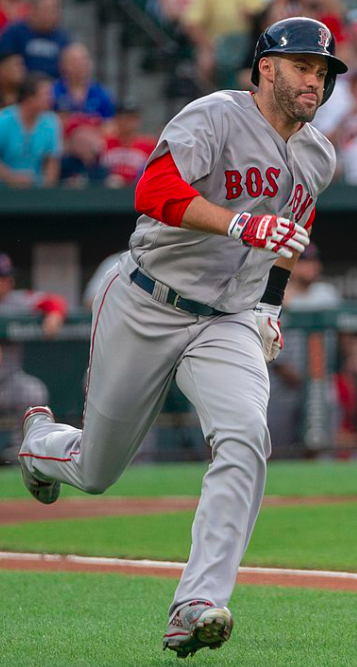
J. D. Martinez was the first player to reach 100 RBIs in the 2018 MLB season.

August 10–August 12, at Baltimore Orioles
In a game with 33 total hits, the Red Sox out-slugged the Orioles, 19–12, in the first game of the series. Trailing 8–5 after five innings, Boston scored six runs in the sixth, three in the seventh, and five in the eighth. Drew Pomeranz, pitching out of the bullpen, got the win, while Brock Holt went 3-for-4 with three RBIs. Holt, Xander Bogaerts, and Andrew Benintendi each homered. J. D. Martinez had two RBIs, giving him 101 for the season. The second game of the series—the first game of a day-night doubleheader to make-up a July 25 rainout—was won by Boston, 5–0. David Price pitched six shutout innings, while Jackie Bradley Jr. hit two home runs and Eduardo Núñez also homered. In the second game of the doubleheader, Boston used seven pitchers en route to a 6–4 win. Martinez hit two home runs, giving him 37 for the season, while Craig Kimbrel recorded his 34th save of the year. Boston won the fourth and final game of the series, 4–1, with Chris Sale recording the win in his return from the disabled list. Steve Pearce homered, and Kimbrel picked up his second save in two days.
Red Sox won the series 4–0 (34–17 runs)

August 14–August 15, at Philadelphia Phillies
Rick Porcello pitched seven innings, holding the Phillies to two hits and one run, as the Red Sox won the opener of a two-game set, 2–1. Boston's runs came on solo homers by Sandy León and pinch hitter Brock Holt. The Phillies won the second game, 7–4, their three-run seventh inning being the difference. Mitch Moreland had three RBIs on a bases-loaded double.
Red Sox split the series 1–1 (6–8 runs)

August 17–August 19, vs. Tampa Bay Rays
In the opening game of the series, Tampa Bay scored three times in the top of the first inning, but was held scoreless for the rest of the game, as Boston won, 7–3. Xander Bogaerts had two doubles and a triple, going 3-for-4 with two RBIs. In the second game of the series, the Red Sox jumped out to a 4–0 lead after the first inning, in what would be a 5–2 win. J. D. Martinez hit his 38th home run of the season, and David Price improved his record to 13–6. Tampa Bay kept Boston scoreless in the closing game of the series, 2–0, as the Red Sox were held to two hits.
Red Sox won the series 2–1 (12–7 runs)

August 20–August 23, vs. Cleveland Indians
In their first series with the Indians during 2018, Boston lost the first game, 5–4, after building a 3–0 lead through two innings. The Indians had three home runs off of Red Sox starter Rick Porcello, who took the loss. In the second game of the series, Cleveland collected 13 hits en route to a 6–3 win, giving Boston their third consecutive loss for only the second time during the season, the first being in April. Starter Nathan Eovaldi took the loss. A five-run fourth inning helped Boston win the third game of the series, 10–4. Mitch Moreland had a home run, while Xander Bogaerts hit two. In the final game of the series, David Price pitched eight shutout innings, as the Red Sox won, 7–0. Boston sent 11 men to the plate in the fifth inning, scoring six times.
Red Sox split the series 2–2 (24–15 runs)

August 24–August 26, at Tampa Bay Rays
This three-game series was played on Players Weekend, when MLB players are allowed and encouraged to put nicknames on the back of their uniforms. For the opening game, the nicknames used by Boston's starting lineup were as follows:

Order	No.	Player	Nickname	Pos.
1	50	Mookie Betts	MOOKIE	DH
2	16	Andrew Benintendi	BENNY	LF
3	25	Steve Pearce	LATE LIGHTNING	1B
4	28	J. D. Martinez	FLACO	RF
5	2	Xander Bogaerts	BOGIE	SS
6	5	Ian Kinsler	BOOTSIE	2B
7	36	Eduardo Núñez	NUNIE	3B
8	23	Blake Swihart	SWI	C
9	19	Jackie Bradley Jr.	JBJ	CF
–	76	Héctor Velázquez	CABEZON	P

Boston out-hit Tampa Bay, 13–12, in the first game of the series, but lost, 10–3. All of Boston's hits were singles, and the team had 11 men left on base. J. D. Martinez and Xander Bogaerts were each 3-for-5 at the plate. In the second game of the series, the Red Sox took a 1–0 lead in the second inning, but were then held scoreless as the Rays won, 5–1. In the closing game of the series, Boston was held to three hits, falling 9–1 to Tampa Bay, marking the first time the Red Sox were swept in a series during the season.
Red Sox lost the series 0–3 (5–24 runs)

August 28–August 29, vs. Miami Marlins

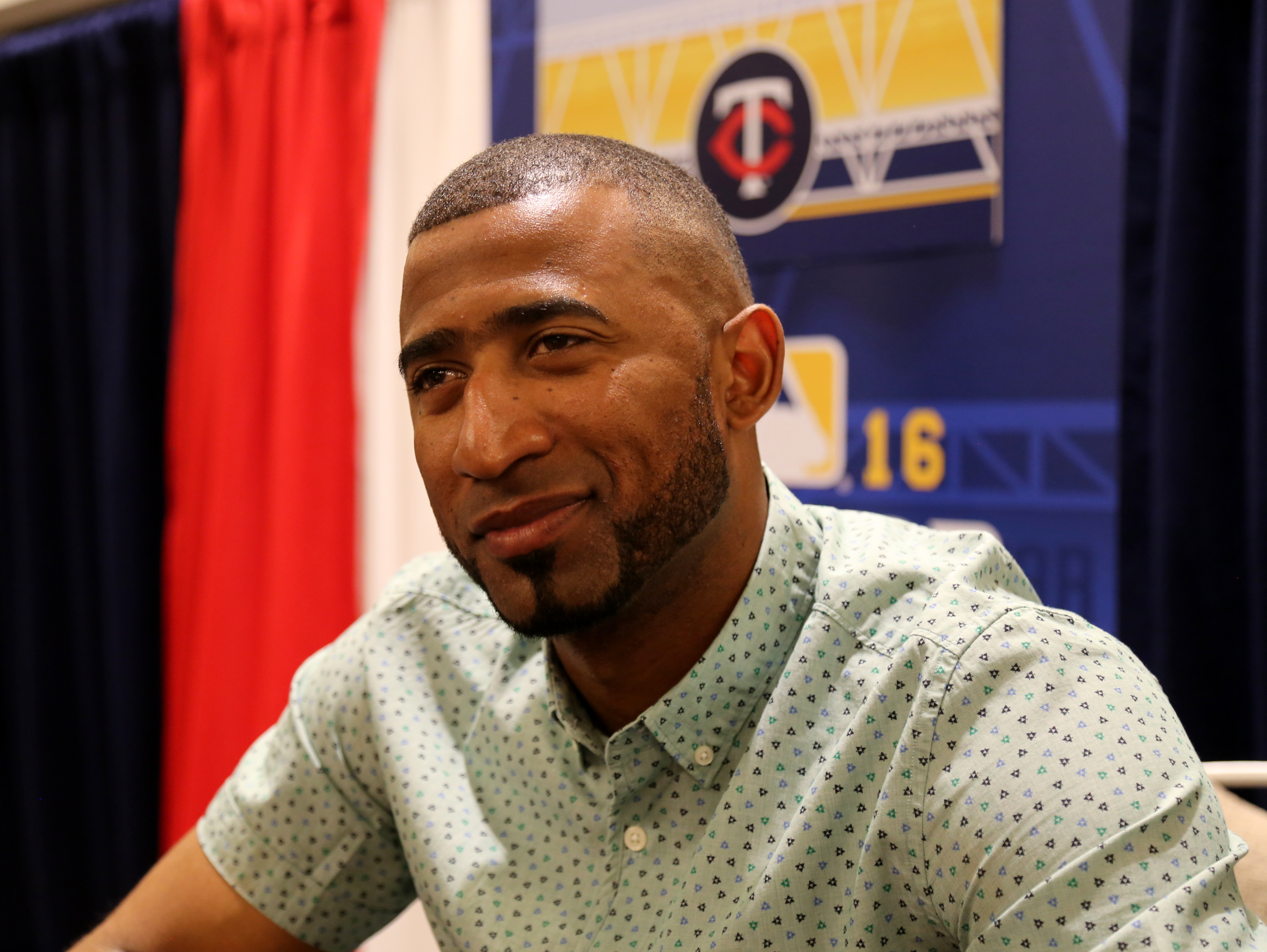
Eduardo Núñez hit his ninth home run of the season against the Marlins on August 29.

In the first game of the series, Boston took a 4–1 lead into the eighth inning, when Miami scored five runs off of the Red Sox bullpen. Trailing 6–4, Boston then scored three in the bottom of the eighth to retake the lead, 7–6. In the top of the ninth, the Marlins tied the game at seven, with a run off of closer Craig Kimbrel. The Red Sox then won the game in the bottom of the ninth when the Marlins were unable to turn a double play on an Eduardo Núñez ground ball, allowing J. D. Martinez to score on a throwing error. In the second and final game of the series, Boston trailed, 5–3, going to the bottom of the seventh, when they erupted for 11 runs on 12 hits. This marked the first time a major league team recorded hits on 12 consecutive at bats in a single inning. A walk and a sacrifice bunt occurred, but those are only considered plate appearances, not at bats. The sequence was: single, double, single, double, double, sacrifice bunt, triple, intentional walk, single, single, single, double, single, single, followed by a ground ball yielding a double play that ended the inning. The Red Sox sent 15 men to the plate, with five batters collecting two hits each. Tyler Thornburg recorded the win in relief, with the final score being 14–6. Both Eduardo Núñez and Mookie Betts hit home runs during the game.
Red Sox won the series 2–0 (22–13 runs)

August 30–August 31, at Chicago White Sox
In the opener of a four-game series, Boston fell behind, 4–0, until scoring nine unanswered runs; four in the seventh inning and five in the ninth inning. Ian Kinsler went 3-for-4, while Mookie Betts and J. D. Martinez both homered. Ryan Brasier notched his first MLB win, one of four Boston relievers who each pitched a scoreless inning. The second game of the series included a two-hour rain delay, as Boston was outhit by Chicago, 14–5, and lost the game, 6–1. Boston's only run was a homer by Andrew Benintendi. Xander Bogaerts was ejected for the first time in his career, following an eighth-inning strikeout.

September

=== September ===
September 1–September 2, at Chicago White Sox (cont.)

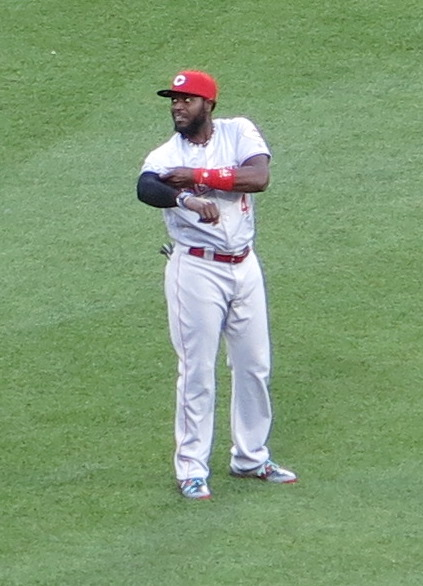
Brandon Phillips had a two-run home run in his Red Sox debut on September 5.

In the third game of a four-game series, Eduardo Rodríguez returned from the disabled list and got the win, striking out 12 in 5 2/3 innings, as the Red Sox won, 6–1. Eduardo Núñez, Jackie Bradley Jr., and Ian Kinsler each hit home runs. Chicago won the final game of the series, 8–0, as Boston was held to five hits, and did not have a runner advance past second base.
Red Sox split the series 2–2 (16–19 runs)

September 3–September 5, at Atlanta Braves
The Red Sox won the series' opening game, 8–2, after holding a 3–2 lead at the end of seven innings and then scoring five unanswered runs in the final two frames. The two teams combined to use 14 pitchers; Brandon Workman got the win in relief. Ian Kinsler went 2-for-5 with three RBIs. In the second game of the series, Atlanta established an early 1–0 lead, but was held scoreless after the second inning, as Boston won, 5–1. Steve Pearce was 3-for-4 with three RBIs, and starter Rick Porcello improved his season record to 16–7. Boston completed the sweep in a come-from-behind victory in the third game of the series. Down 7–1 after seven innings, the Red Sox rallied for six runs in the top of the eighth to tie the game. After the Braves scored once in the bottom of the eighth on a solo home run by Freddie Freeman, a two-run home run by Brandon Phillips in the top of the ninth gave the Red Sox a 9–8 lead. Craig Kimbrel closed out the win in the bottom of the ninth with his 38th save of the season. Phillips, who was making his Red Sox debut, was 1-for-3 with two walks, two RBIs, and three runs scored.
Red Sox won the series 3–0 (22–11 runs)

September 7–September 9, vs. Houston Astros
The Astros won the first game of the series, 6–3, after being held scoreless through the first six innings. Starter David Price had 10 strikeouts in 6 1/3 innings and was charged with two runs, although all of Houston's runs were scored with Red Sox relief pitchers on the mound. Xander Bogaerts hit his 20th home run of the season. The Astros won the second game, 5–3, after building a 5–1 lead through four innings. Eduardo Rodríguez took the loss, allowing five runs in 3 1/3 innings, while Bogaerts again homered. Boston won the closing game of the series, 6–5, with Mitch Moreland hitting a walk-off RBI single in the bottom of the ninth to break a 5–5 tie. The Red Sox had built a 5–1 lead through five innings, only to see the Astros plate four runs in the sixth to tie the game. J. D. Martinez hit his 40th home run of the season, while Bogaerts was 4-for-4 with a walk and an RBI. Mookie Betts went 7-for-12 during the series, raising his average to .342 for the season.
Red Sox lost the series 1–2 (12–16 runs)

September 11–September 13, vs. Toronto Blue Jays
In the first game of the series, Toronto had a 2–0 lead through six innings, with Boston then scoring seven unanswered runs for a 7–2 final. Chris Sale returned from the disabled list, pitching the first inning as the Red Sox used seven pitchers in relief, with Ryan Brasier getting the win. Brock Holt hit a three-run pinch-hit home run, as the Red Sox became the first major league team to clinch a spot in the 2018 postseason. Boston won the second game of the series, 1–0, with the game's only run coming on a wild pitch in the fifth inning. Starter David Price went seven innings while striking out seven, walking none, and limiting the Blue Jays to three hits. With this win, the Red Sox reached 100 wins for the first time since their 1946 season. In the final game of the series, J. D. Martinez hit his 41st homer of the season to tie for the MLB lead. Toronto scored twice in the top of the eighth inning to tie the game, 3–3. Boston went ahead, 4–3, in the bottom of the inning, with Xander Bogaerts scoring from third on an infield error. Craig Kimbrel then retired the Blue Jays in order for his 40th save of the season.
Red Sox won the series 3–0 (12–5 runs)

September 14–September 16, vs. New York Mets

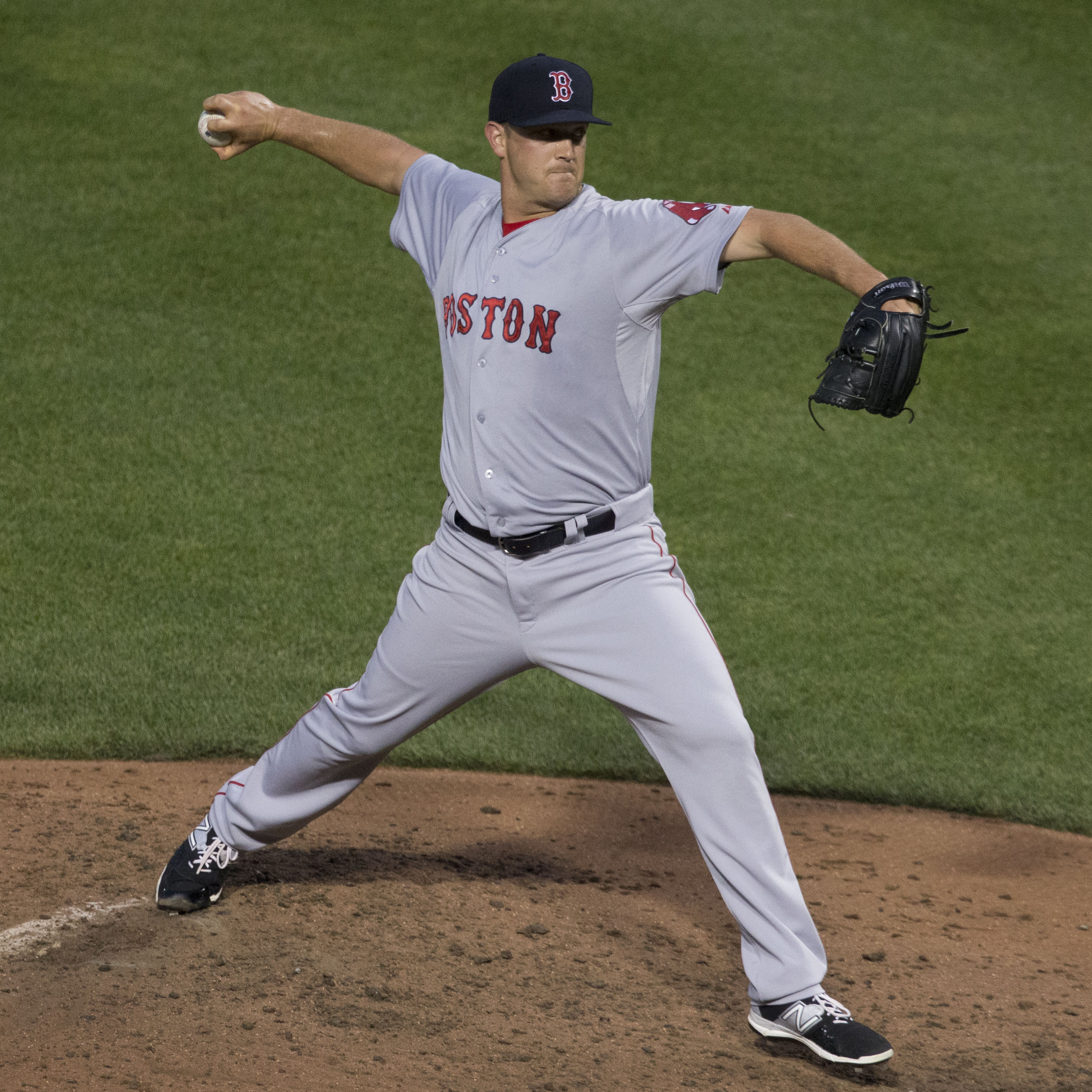
Steven Wright pitched three innings of scoreless relief on September 20, getting the win as the Red Sox clinched the AL East division title.

The Red Sox were held scoreless in the first game of the series, losing 8–0 as Mets starter Noah Syndergaard allowed only three hits in seven innings. In the second game of the series, Boston overcame a 3–1 deficit, scoring four runs in the fifth inning on two-RBI doubles by Jackie Bradley Jr. and Brock Holt, for a 5–3 final. Steve Pearce was 3-for-4 at the plate, while Rick Porcello improved his record to 17–7 for the season. In the final game of the series, Boston scored three runs in the third inning, with two of those runs coming on a home run by Holt, en route to a 4–3 win. The Red Sox used a total of seven pitchers, with starter Chris Sale going three innings and getting a no decision.
Red Sox won the series 2–1 (9–14 runs)

September 18–September 20, at New York Yankees
In the opening game of the three-game series, Red Sox starter Nathan Eovaldi held the Yankees scoreless through six innings. However, his gem was wasted as Neil Walker hit a three-run home run off of Ryan Brasier in the seventh inning, and the Yankees went on to win, 3–2. New York took the second game of the series, 10–1, with first baseman Luke Voit going 4-for-4 at the plate including three RBIs on two home runs. Boston won the closing game of the series, 11–6, with homers from Brock Holt, Jackie Bradley Jr., and Mookie Betts. The win gave the Red Sox the American League East division title, for the third consecutive season.
Red Sox lost the series 1–2 (14–19 runs)

September 21–September 23, at Cleveland Indians
Sam Travis and Tzu-Wei Lin hit their first major league home runs for Boston in a 7–5 victory in the opener, a game that saw Matt Barnes pick up his sixth win of the season after starter Chris Sale pitched 3 1/3 innings, giving up two earned runs and striking out seven. Cleveland won the second game of the series, 5–4, in 11 innings. Drew Pomeranz took the loss in relief, with Rafael Devers and Blake Swihart hitting home runs for Boston. The third game of the series was again an 11-inning Cleveland win, 4–3. Mookie Betts went 4-for-6, including his 31st home run of the season; William Cuevas allowed only one run in 5 1/3 innings of relief, but took the loss.
Red Sox lost the series 1–2 (14–14 runs)

September 24–September 26, vs. Baltimore Orioles

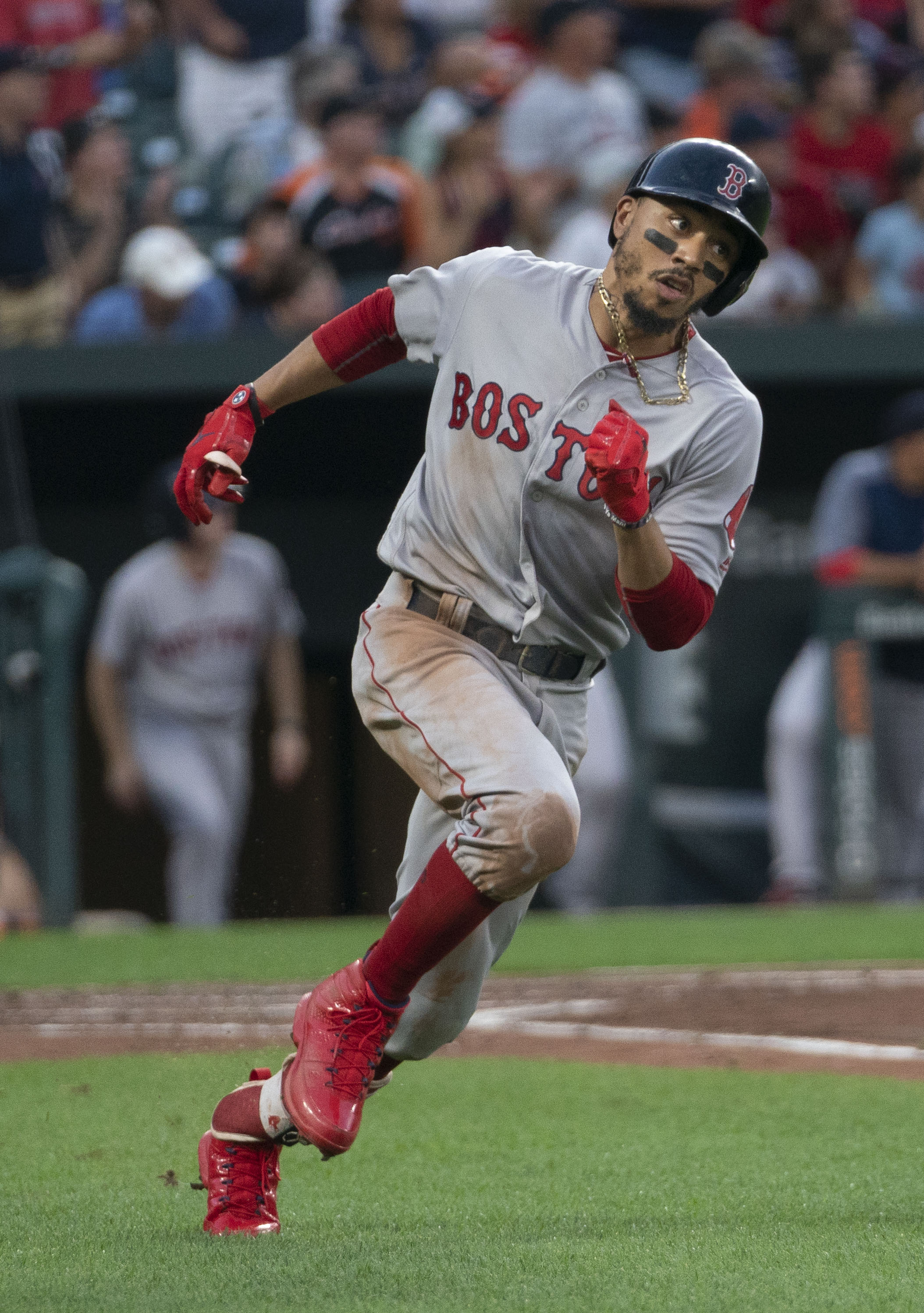
Mookie Betts joined the 30–30 club with his 30th steal of the season, on September 26 against the Orioles.

The Red Sox won their 106th game of the season, setting a new franchise record, with a 6–2 victory in the opening game of the series. Starting pitcher Nathan Eovaldi allowed one run in five innings and got the win, while Mookie Betts hit his 32nd home run of the season. The second game of the series, postponed a day due to rain, saw the Red Sox score early and often, en route to a 19–3 victory. Baltimore starting pitcher Ryan Meisinger lasted only one-third of an inning while giving up five runs. David Price got the win for Boston, while J. D. Martinez, Xander Bogaerts, and Blake Swihart each had home runs and Rafael Devers went 4-for-5 including two homers and six RBIs. Betts had his 30th stolen base of the season, making him the 40th player in MLB history with at least 30 homers and 30 steals in a season, joining the 30–30 club. The Orioles won the final game of the series, 10–3, scoring seven unanswered runs after the game was tied at three at the end of the fifth inning, just their 3rd win against the Red Sox all season.
Red Sox won the series 2–1 (28–15 runs)

September 28–September 30, vs. New York Yankees
In the first game of the final regular season series, the Yankees defeated the Red Sox, 11–6, after jumping out to an 8–0 lead after four innings. Steve Pearce had five RBIs, including Boston's tenth grand slam of the year. New York's win gave them home field advantage for the 2018 American League Wild Card Game. New York also took the second game, 8–5, their 100th win of the season. Brock Holt homered for Boston. The Red Sox won the final game of the series and their regular season, 10–2. Xander Bogaerts and J. D. Martinez both homered, with Eduardo Rodríguez picking up the win as Boston used eight pitchers. Mookie Betts went 1-for-2 and finished the season with a .346 average, while Martinez finished with 43 home runs and 130 RBIs.
Red Sox lost the series 1–2 (21–21 runs)

== Postseason ==
=== American League Division Series vs. New York Yankees ===
Boston entered the Division Series as the top seed in the American League, facing New York, the AL Wild Card Game winner. This was the first ALDS meeting between the teams (playoff structure before 2012 precluded teams in the same division from meeting before the Championship Series). After splitting the first two games at Fenway Park, the Red Sox won the next two games at Yankee Stadium, eliminating New York and sending Boston on to the ALCS.

The Red Sox' 16–1 defeat of the Yankees in Game 3, during a misty evening in The Bronx, included two historical footnotes. Firstly, the fifteen-run margin of victory for Boston accounted for the Yankees' worst-ever postseason defeat. The Red Sox failed to score in only the first, fifth, and sixth innings, and generated 7 of their 16 runs in the fourth inning, chasing starter Luis Severino and batting through the order. In addition, Brock Holt hit for the cycle, the first player ever to do so in an MLB postseason game, capping off his performance with a ninth-inning home run against catcher Austin Romine, brought in to pitch when the New York bullpen was overtaxed.

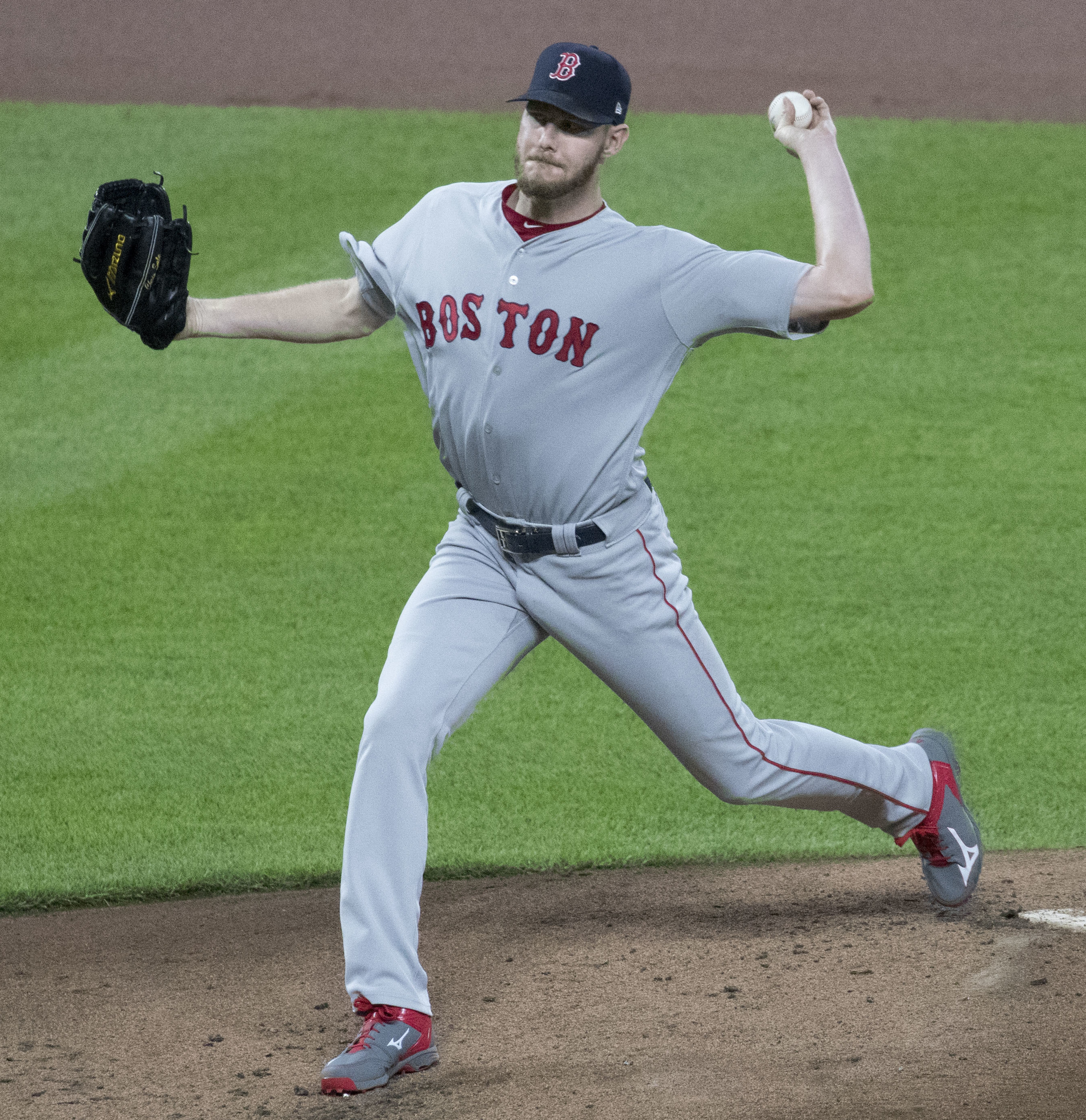
Chris Sale got the win at Fenway in Game 1.

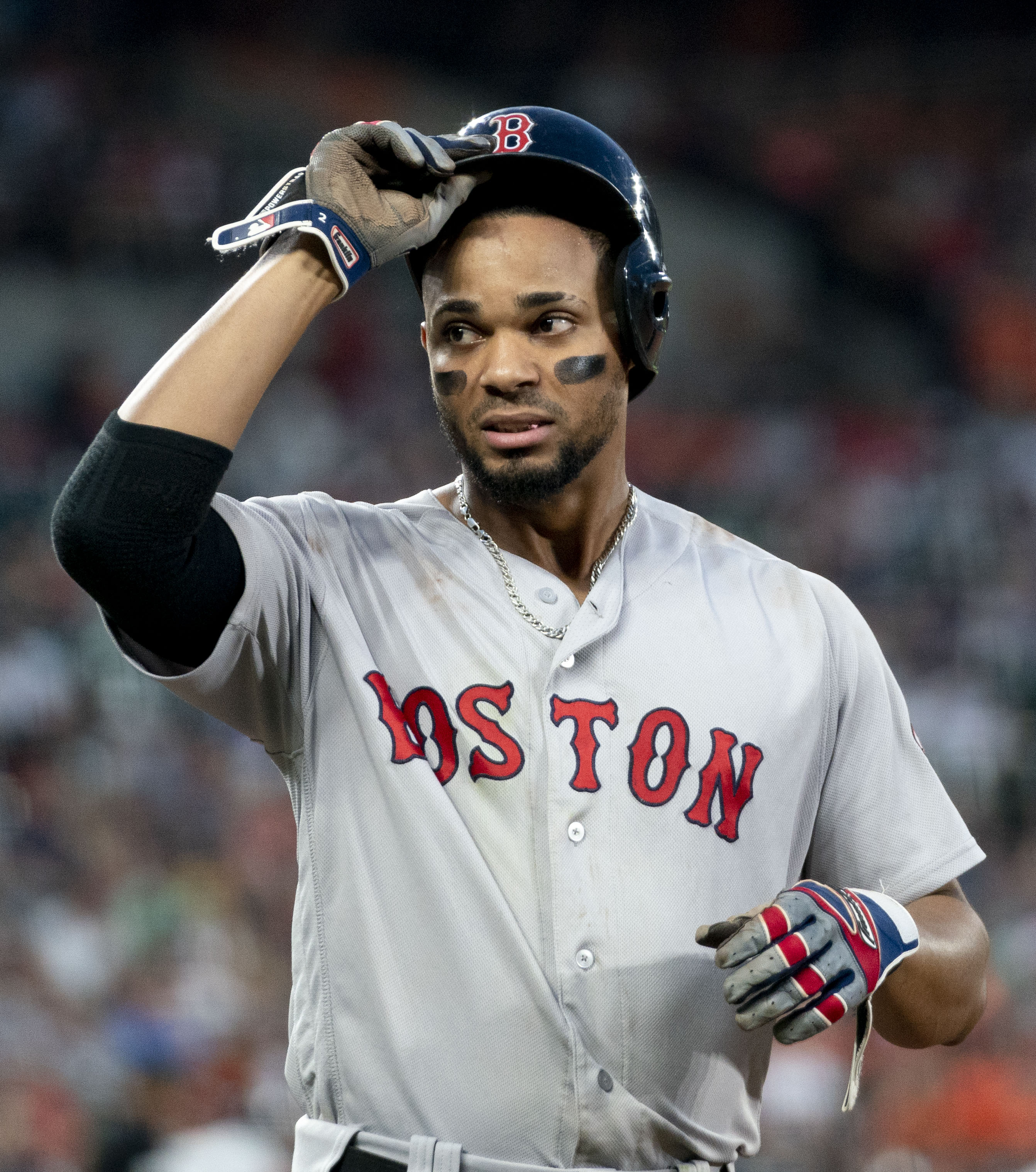
Xander Bogaerts hit Boston's only home run in Game 2.

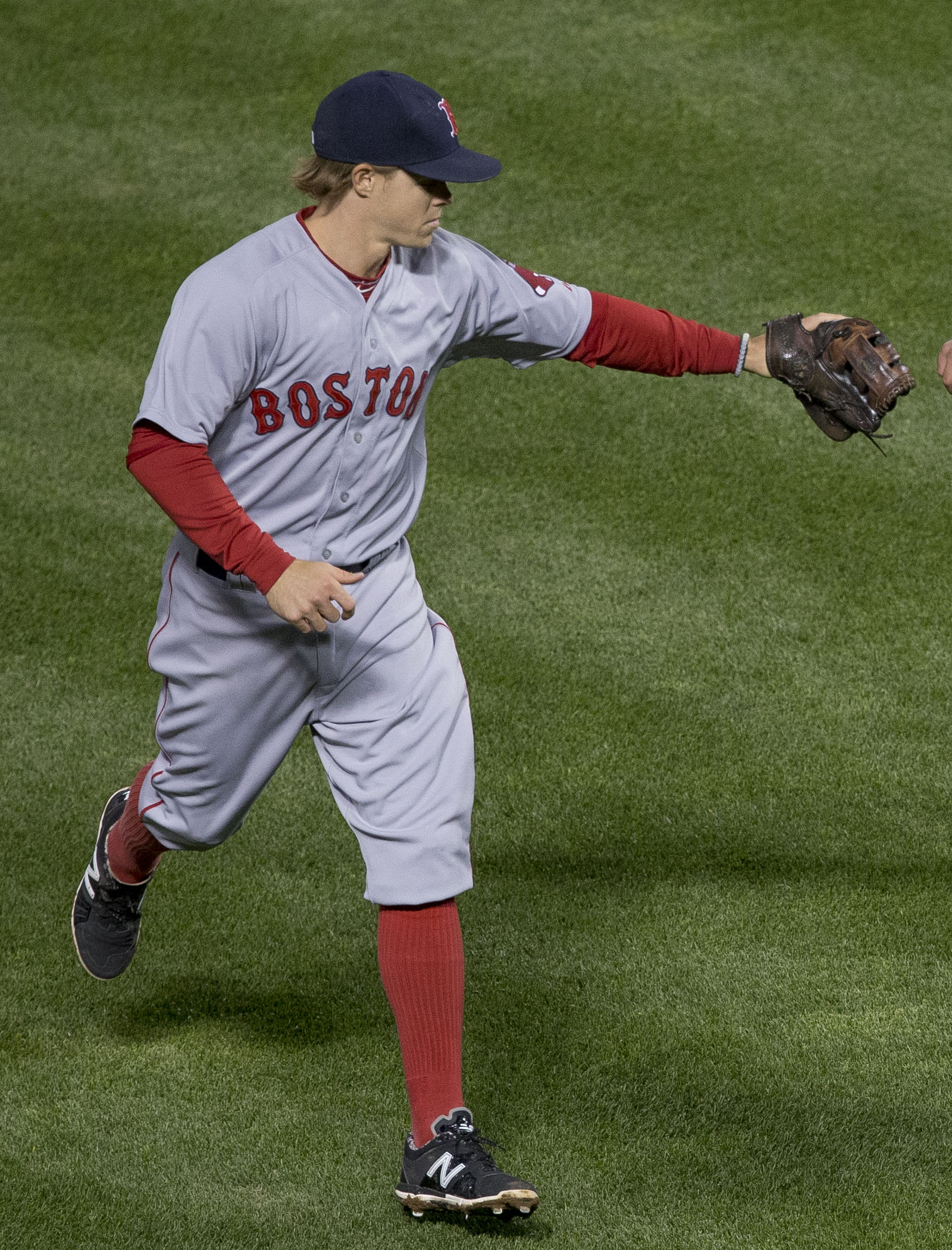
Brock Holt hit the first postseason cycle in MLB history in Game 3.

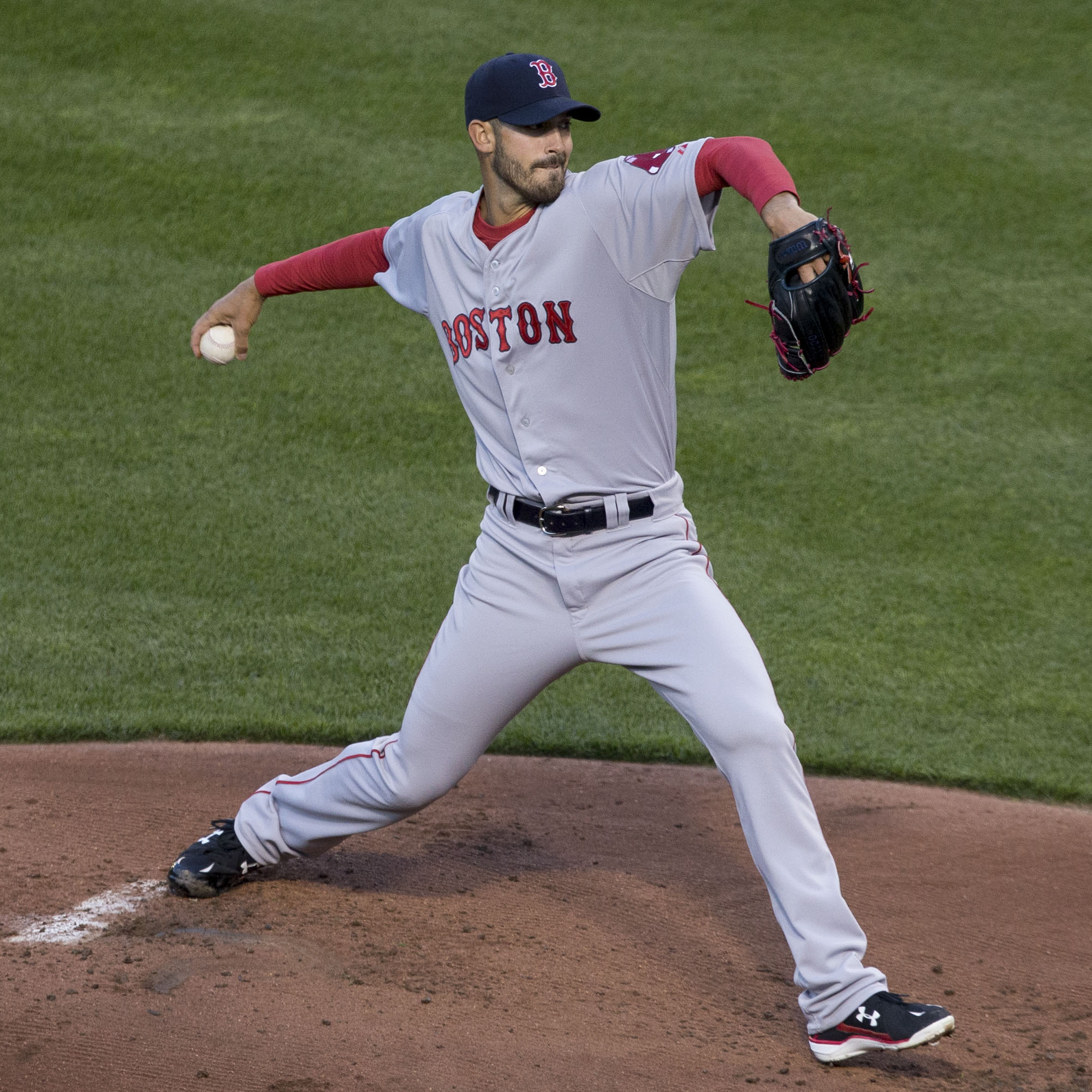
Boston starter Rick Porcello got the win in Game 4, sending the Red Sox to the ALCS.

Game 1, October 5 at Fenway Park

Friday, October 5, 2018 7:32 pm EDT at Fenway Park in Boston, Massachusetts
Team	1	2	3	4	5	6	7	8	9	R	H	E
New York	0	0	0	0	0	2	1	0	1	4	10	0
Boston	3	0	2	0	0	0	0	0	X	5	8	0
WP: Chris Sale (1–0) LP: J. A. Happ (0–1) Sv: Craig Kimbrel (1); Home runs: NYY: Aaron Judge (1); BOS: J. D. Martinez (1); Attendance: 39,059; Boxscore

Game 2, October 6 at Fenway Park

Saturday, October 6, 2018 8:15 pm (EDT) at Fenway Park in Boston, Massachusetts, 62 °F (17 °C), cloudy
Team	1	2	3	4	5	6	7	8	9	R	H	E
New York	1	2	0	0	0	0	3	0	0	6	8	0
Boston	0	0	0	1	0	0	1	0	0	2	5	1
WP: Masahiro Tanaka (1–0) LP: David Price (0–1); Home runs: NYY: Aaron Judge (2), Gary Sánchez 2 (2); BOS: Xander Bogaerts (1); Attendance: 39,151; Boxscore

Game 3, October 8 at Yankee Stadium

Monday, October 8, 2018 7:40 pm (EDT) at Yankee Stadium in Bronx, New York 66 °F (19 °C), drizzle
Team	1	2	3	4	5	6	7	8	9	R	H	E
Boston	0	1	2	7	0	0	1	3	2	16	18	0
New York	0	0	0	1	0	0	0	0	0	1	5	0
WP: Nathan Eovaldi (1–0) LP: Luis Severino (0–1); Home runs: BOS: Brock Holt (1); NYY: None; Attendance: 49,657; Boxscore

Game 4, October 9 at Yankee Stadium

Tuesday, October 9, 2018 8:07 pm (EDT) at Yankee Stadium in Bronx, New York 72 °F (22 °C), clear
Team	1	2	3	4	5	6	7	8	9	R	H	E
Boston	0	0	3	1	0	0	0	0	0	4	8	0
New York	0	0	0	0	1	0	0	0	2	3	5	1
WP: Rick Porcello (1–0) LP: CC Sabathia (0–1) Sv: Craig Kimbrel (2); Home runs: BOS: Christian Vázquez (1); NYY: None; Attendance: 49,641; Boxscore

=== American League Championship Series vs. Houston Astros ===
Boston faced Houston in the Championship Series, a matchup of 100-win teams, and a rematch of the 2017 ALDS, which was won by Houston. After losing Game 1 at Fenway, the Red Sox won the next four games, including three played in Houston, to eliminate the Astros and advance to the World Series. Game 1 starter Chris Sale had a stomach issue during the week, which included brief hospital stay, and manager Alex Cora decided not to have him start Game 5. David Price started in his place and held Houston scoreless through six innings while allowing just three hits and striking out nine. It was Price's first win in 12 career postseason starts. Jackie Bradley Jr., who had nine RBIs in the series on three hits (a double and two home runs), was named ALCS MVP.

Game 1, October 13 at Fenway Park

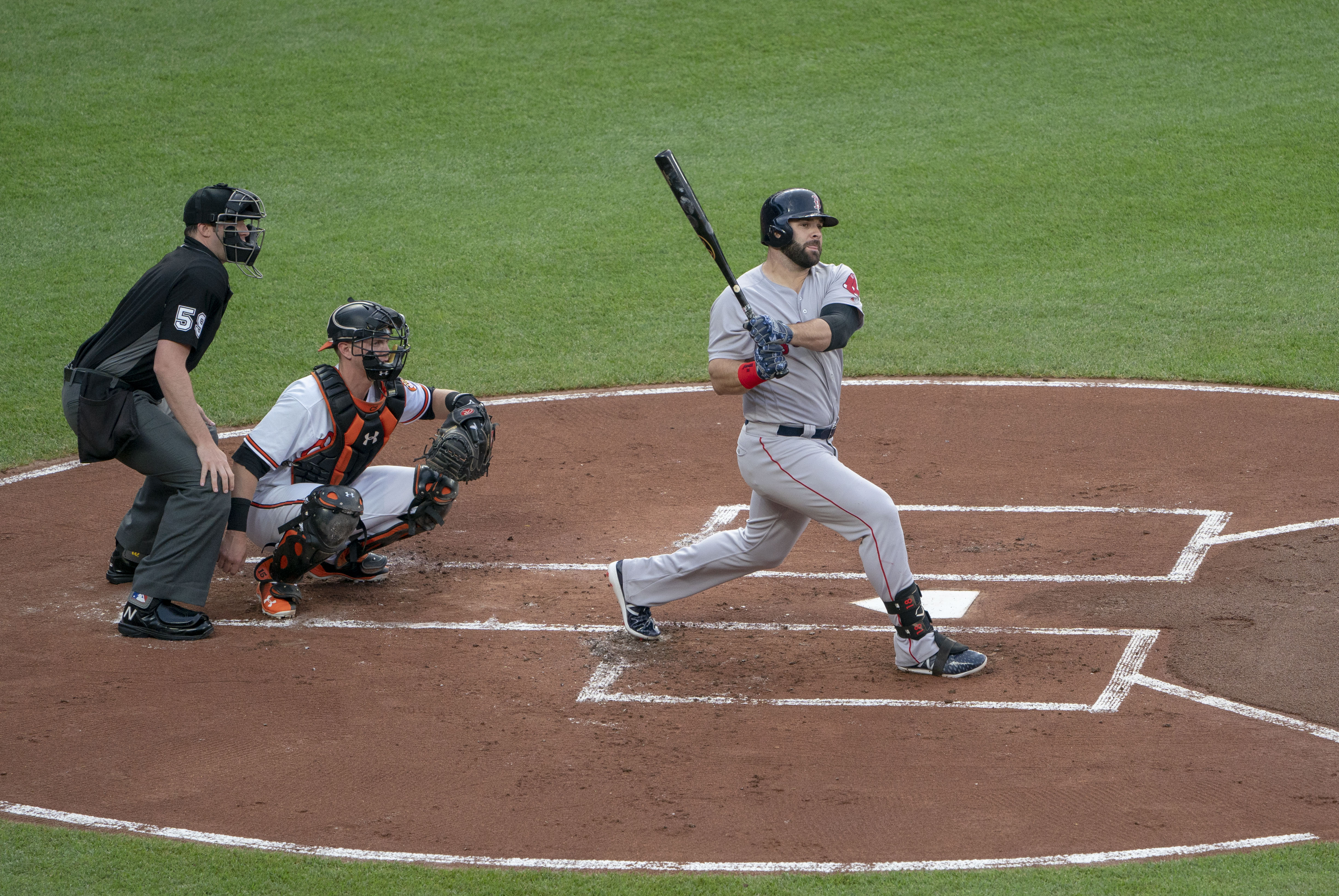
Mitch Moreland had a bases loaded walk in Game 1 for Boston's first RBI of the ALCS.

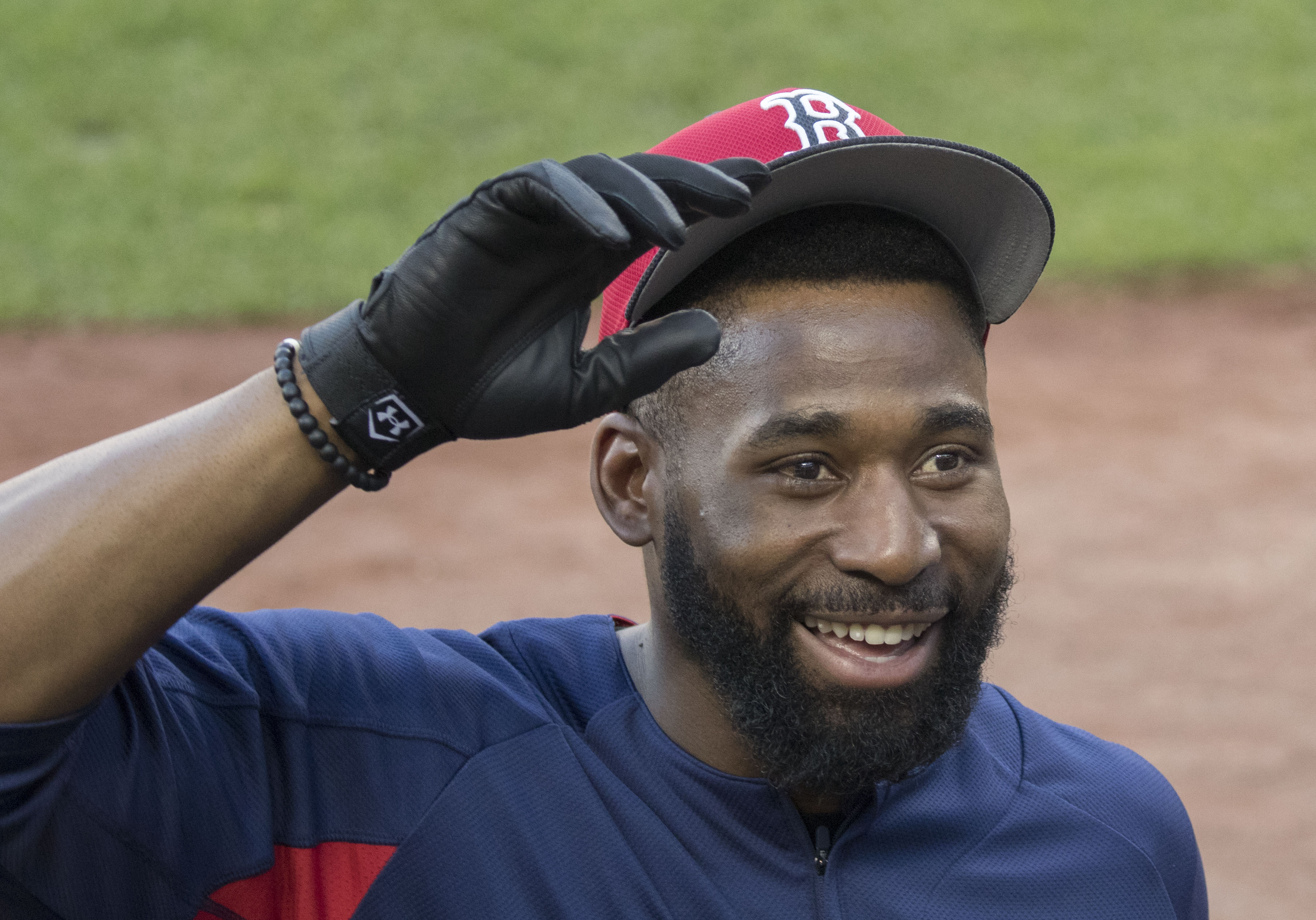
A three-RBI double by Jackie Bradley Jr. gave the Red Sox a 5–4 lead in Game 2.

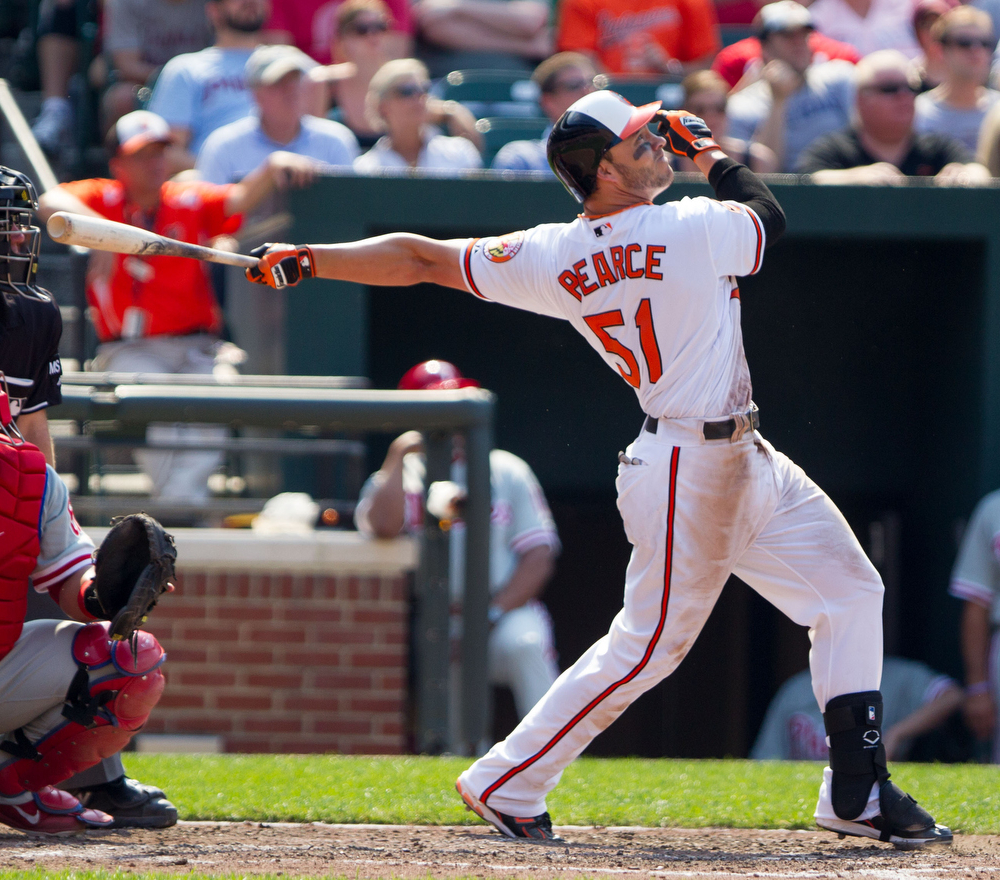
Steve Pearce, seen here with the Orioles in 2012, hit a go-ahead home run in the 6th inning of Game 3.

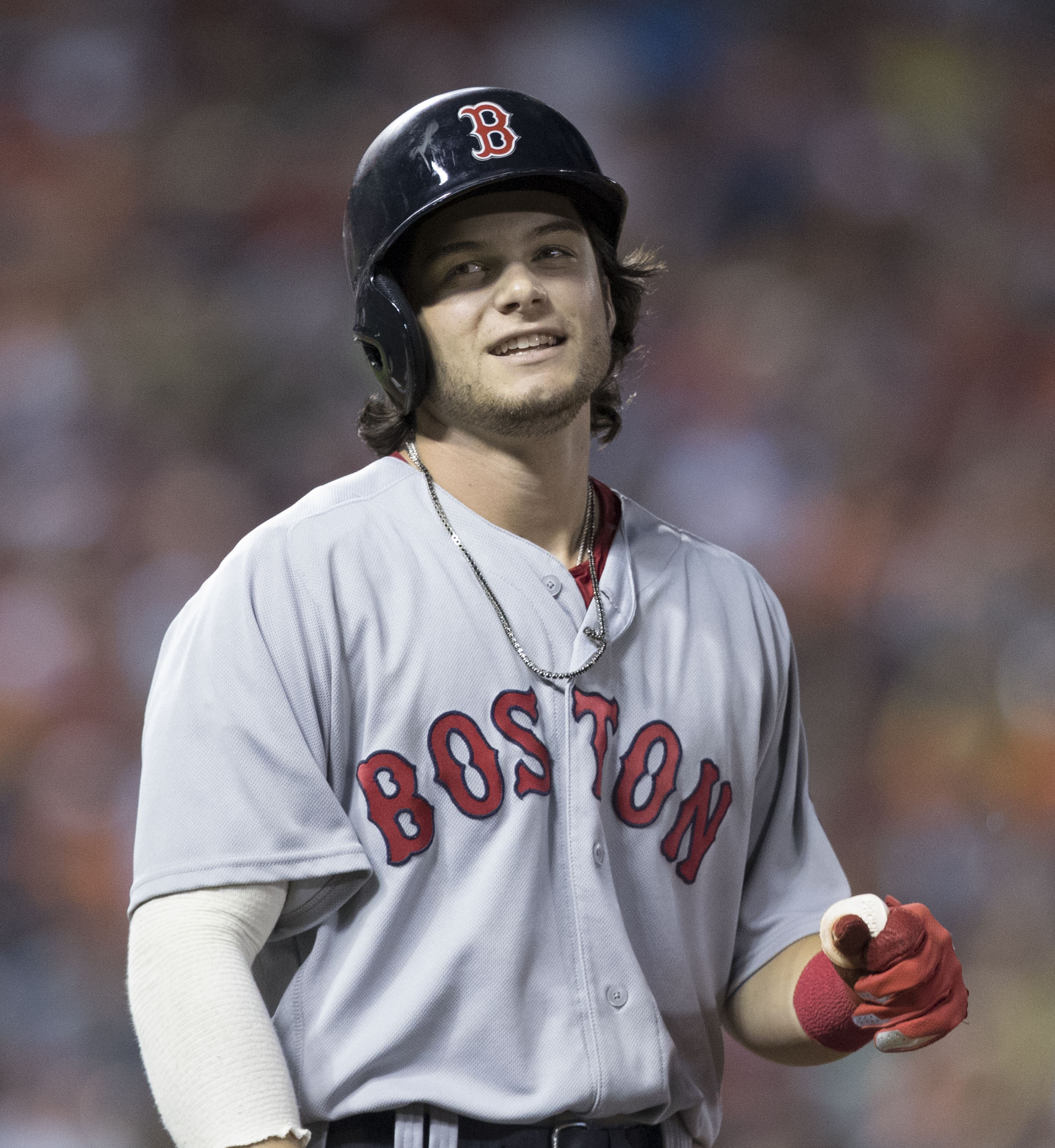
Andrew Benintendi had two doubles, scored twice, and made a game-ending diving catch in Game 4.

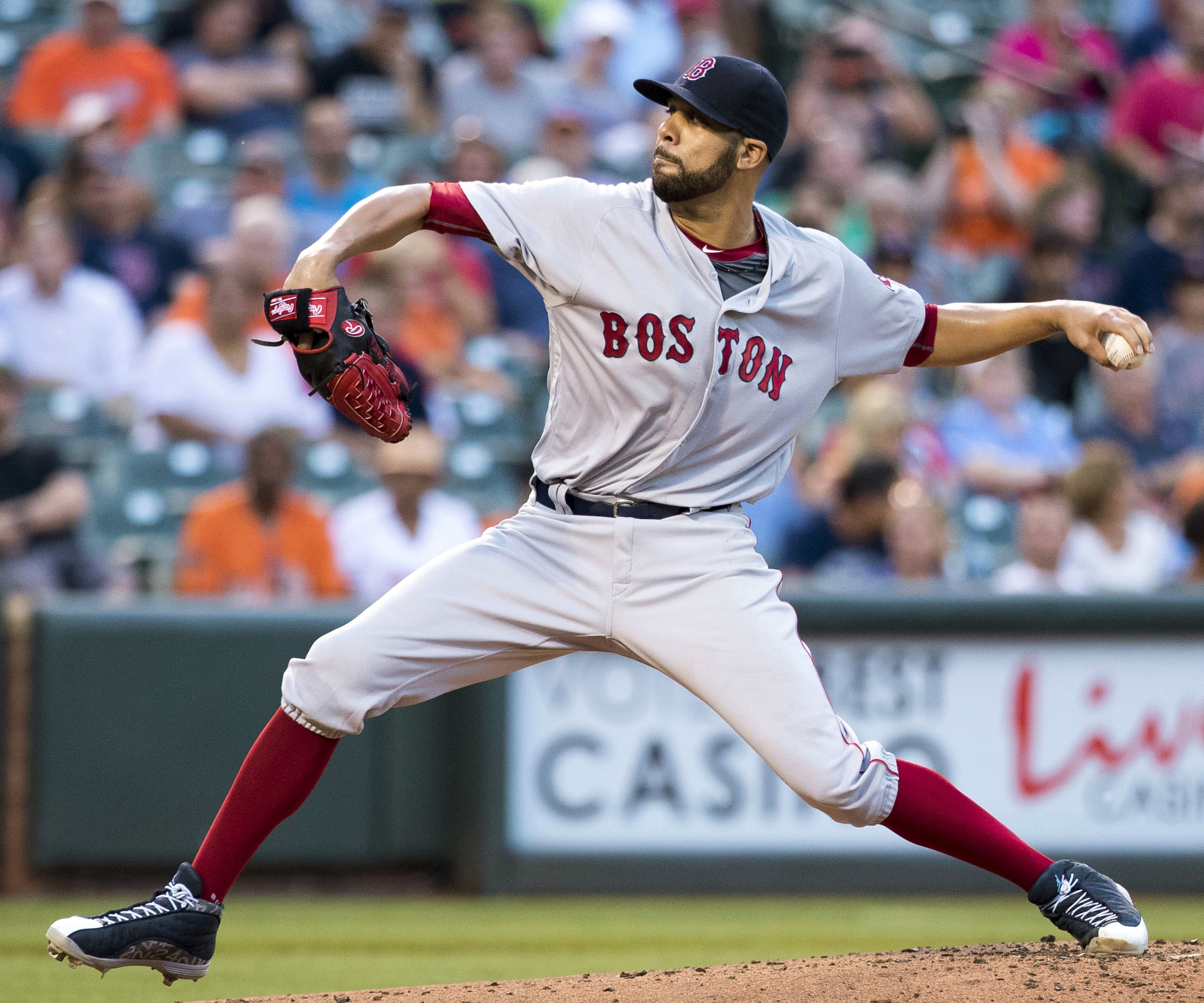
Boston starter David Price struck out nine and got the Game 5 win, as Boston advanced to the World Series.

Saturday, October 13, 2018 8:09 pm (EDT) at Fenway Park in Boston, Massachusetts, 50 °F (10 °C), clear
Team	1	2	3	4	5	6	7	8	9	R	H	E
Houston	0	2	0	0	0	1	0	0	4	7	5	1
Boston	0	0	0	0	2	0	0	0	0	2	3	1
WP: Justin Verlander (1–0) LP: Joe Kelly (0–1); Home runs: HOU: Josh Reddick (1), Yuli Gurriel (1); BOS: None; Attendance: 38,007; Boxscore

Game 2, October 14 at Fenway Park

Sunday, October 14, 2018 7:09 pm (EDT) at Fenway Park in Boston, Massachusetts, 55 °F (13 °C), partly cloudy
Team	1	2	3	4	5	6	7	8	9	R	H	E
Houston	0	2	2	0	0	0	0	0	1	5	7	1
Boston	2	0	3	0	0	0	1	1	X	7	9	0
WP: Matt Barnes (1–0) LP: Gerrit Cole (0–1) Sv: Craig Kimbrel (1); Home runs: HOU: Marwin González (1); BOS: None; Attendance: 37,960; Boxscore

Game 3, October 16 at Minute Maid Park

Tuesday, October 16, 2018 4:09 pm (CDT) at Minute Maid Park in Houston, Texas 63 °F (17 °C), roof closed
Team	1	2	3	4	5	6	7	8	9	R	H	E
Boston	2	0	0	0	0	1	0	5	0	8	9	0
Houston	1	0	0	0	1	0	0	0	0	2	7	0
WP: Nathan Eovaldi (1–0) LP: Joe Smith (0–1); Home runs: BOS: Steve Pearce (1), Jackie Bradley Jr. (1); HOU: None; Attendance: 43,102; Boxscore

Game 4, October 17 at Minute Maid Park

Wednesday, October 17, 2018 7:39 pm (CDT) at Minute Maid Park in Houston, Texas, 65 °F (18 °C), roof closed
Team	1	2	3	4	5	6	7	8	9	R	H	E
Boston	2	0	1	0	1	2	1	1	0	8	11	1
Houston	0	1	2	1	1	0	0	1	0	6	13	0
WP: Joe Kelly (1–1) LP: Josh James (0–1) Sv: Craig Kimbrel (2); Home runs: BOS: Jackie Bradley Jr. (2); HOU: George Springer (1), Tony Kemp (1); Attendance: 43,277; Boxscore

Game 5, October 18 at Minute Maid Park

Thursday, October 18, 2018 7:09 pm (CDT) at Minute Maid Park in Houston, Texas, 67 °F (19 °C), roof closed
Team	1	2	3	4	5	6	7	8	9	R	H	E
Boston	0	0	1	0	0	3	0	0	0	4	8	0
Houston	0	0	0	0	0	0	1	0	0	1	5	1
WP: David Price (1–0) LP: Justin Verlander (1–1) Sv: Craig Kimbrel (3); Home runs: BOS: J. D. Martinez (1), Rafael Devers (1); HOU: Marwin González (2); Attendance: 43,210; Boxscore

=== World Series vs. Los Angeles Dodgers ===
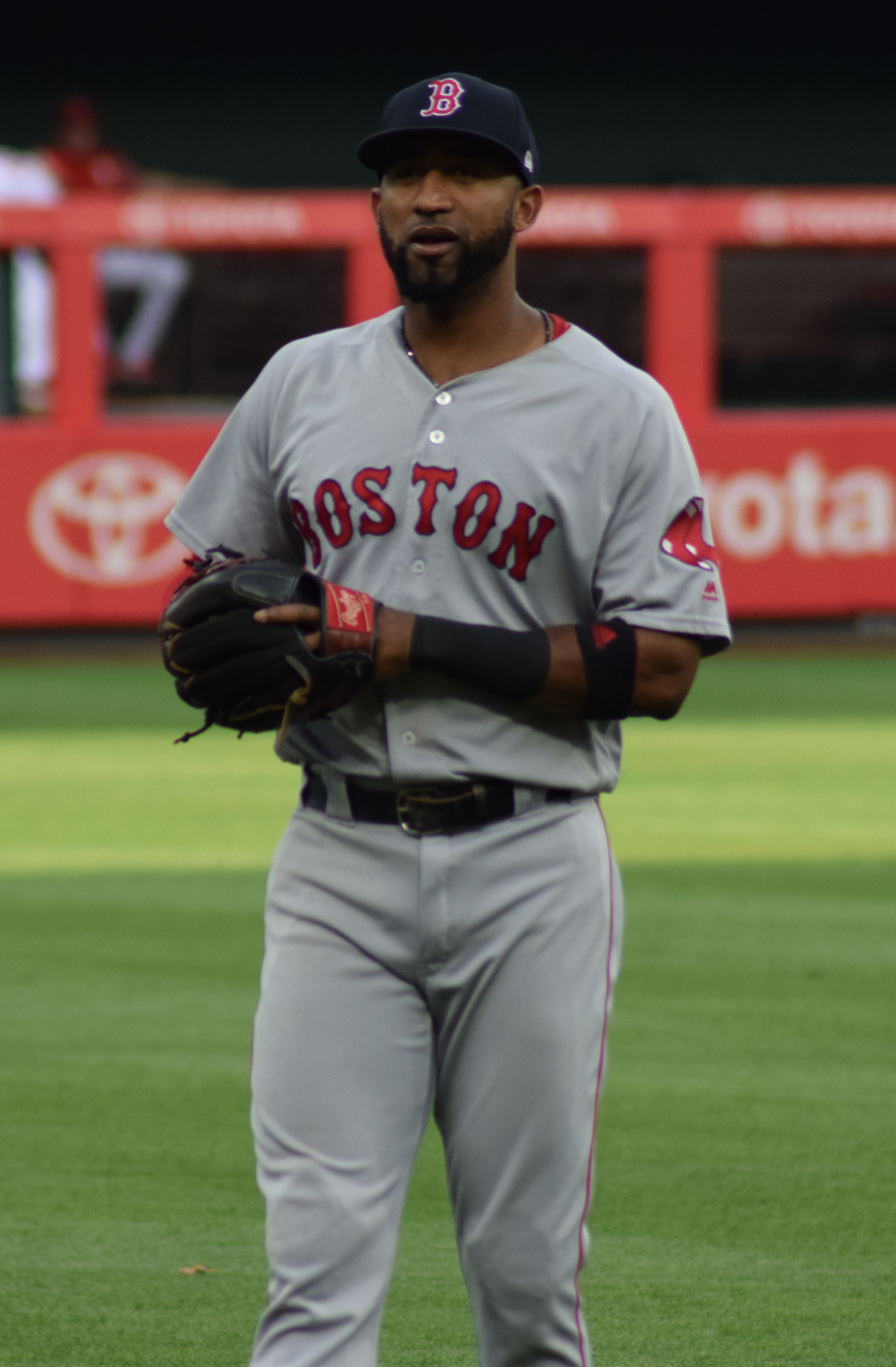
Eduardo Núñez hit a three-run homer in the 7th inning of Game 1.

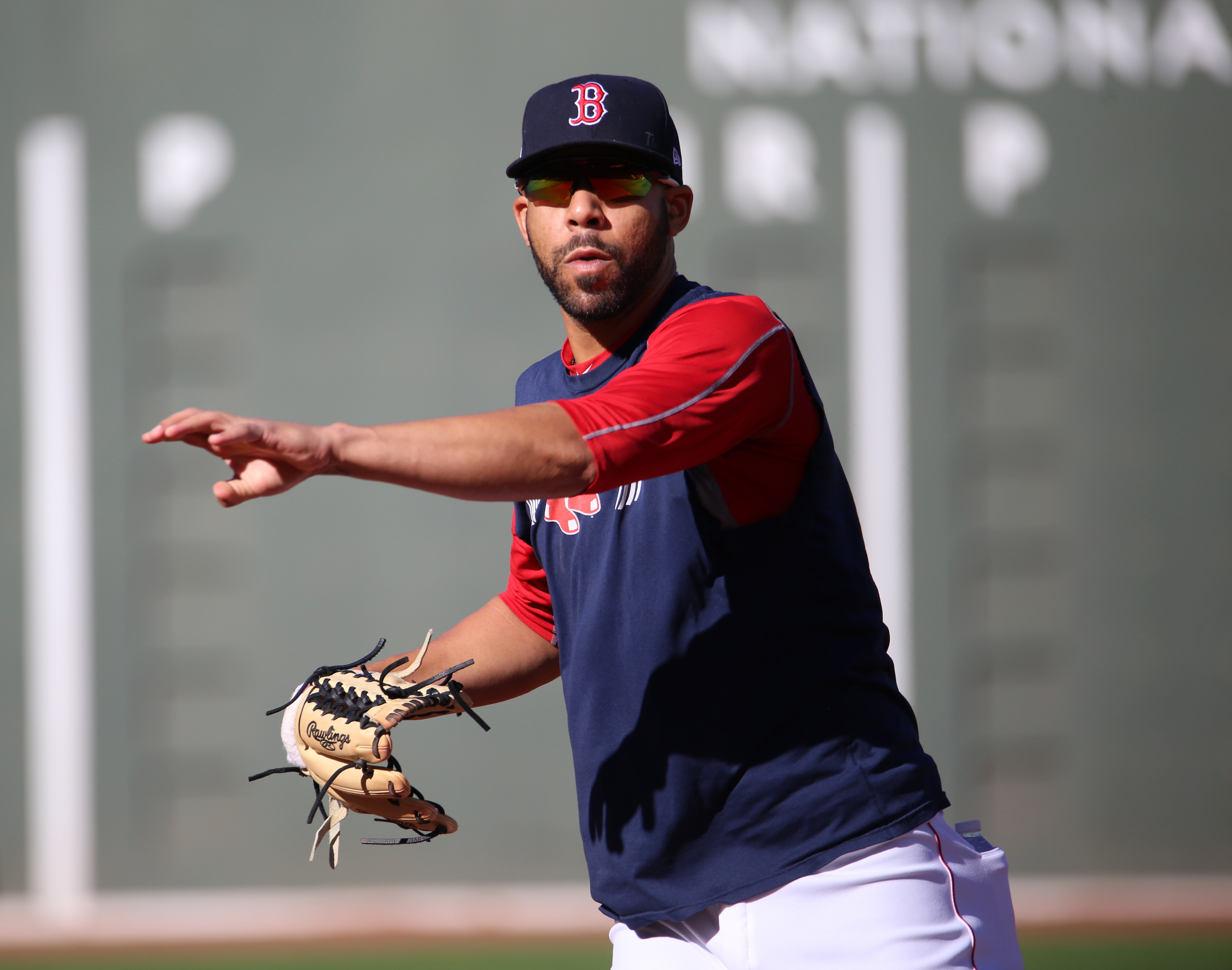
Boston starter David Price got the win in Game 2, his second win of the 2018 postseason.

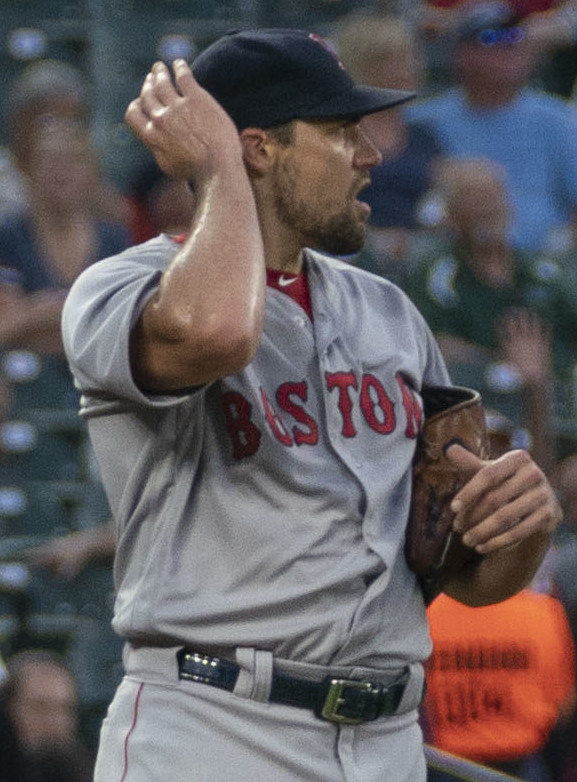
Nathan Eovaldi pitched six innings of relief in Game 3, holding the Dodgers to three hits, but ultimately taking the loss in the 18th inning.

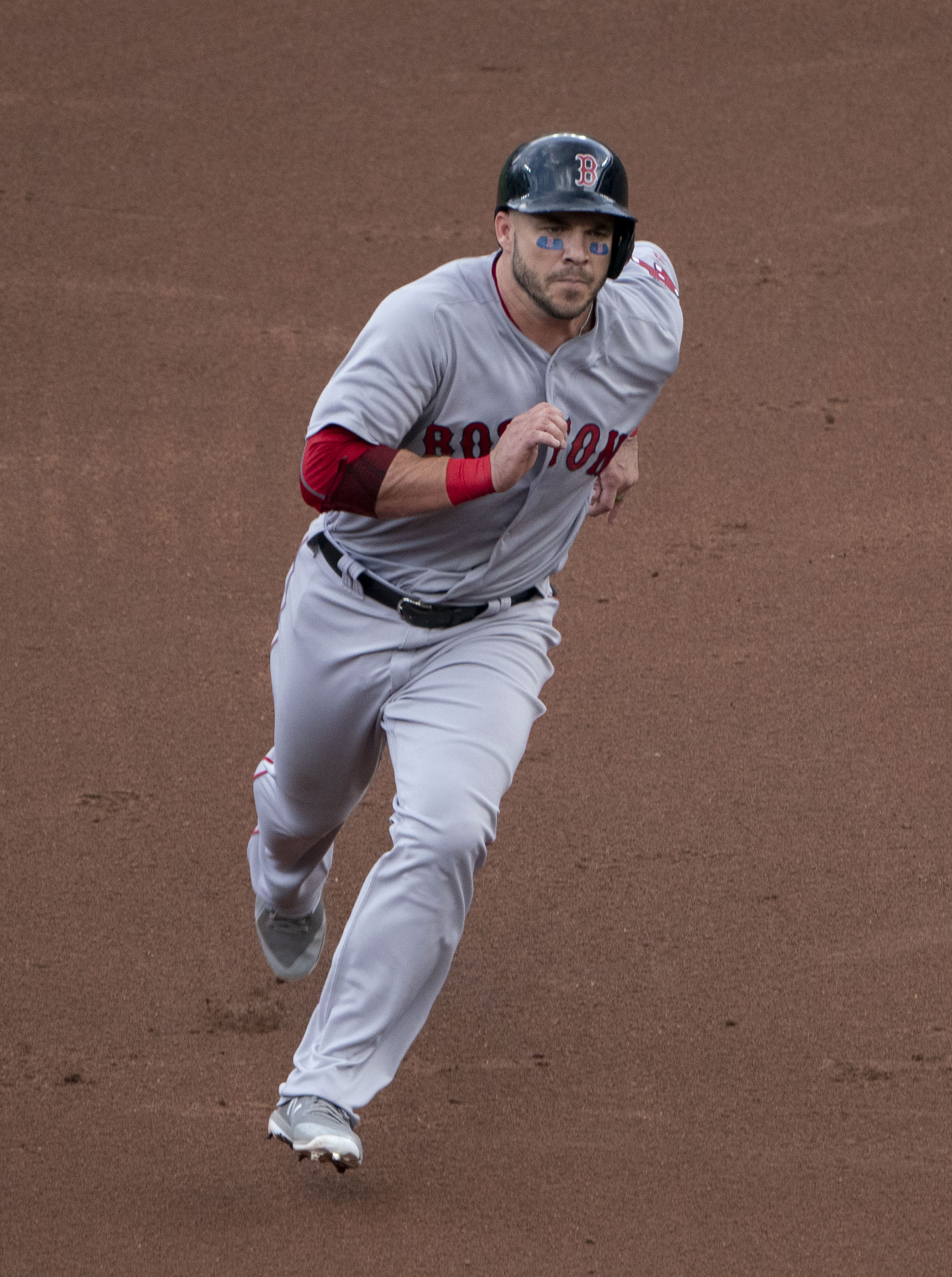
Steve Pearce had four RBIs and scored twice in Boston's Game 4 win.

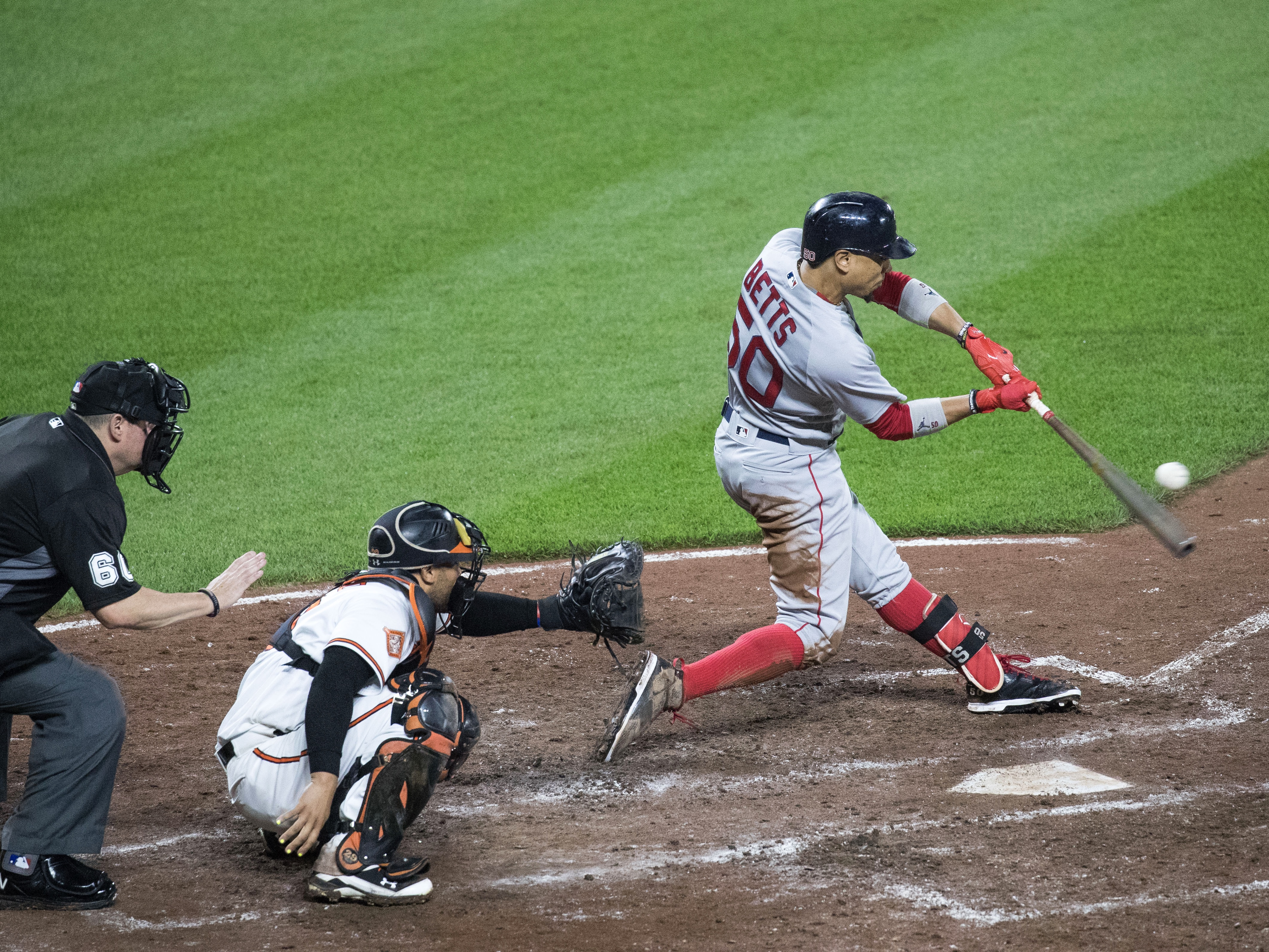
Mookie Betts hit the first postseason home run of his career in Game 5.

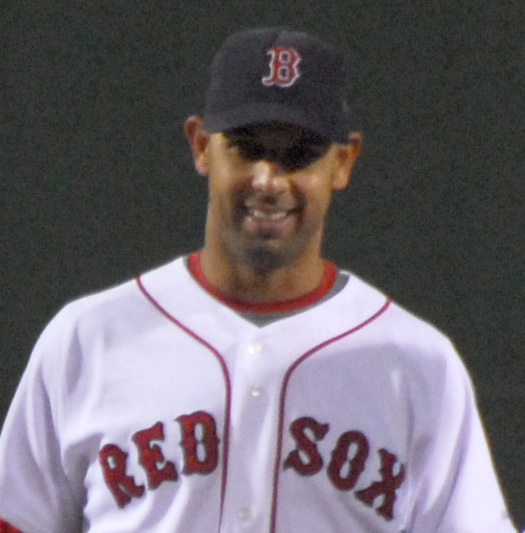
Alex Cora, seen here as a player in 2008, led the Red Sox to the World Series championship in his first year as manager.

The Red Sox and Dodgers franchises met in the World Series for the second time; the first was a Boston win in 1916. Game 1 was highlighted by neither Chris Sale nor Clayton Kershaw making it through the fifth inning, and a pinch hit three-run home run by Eduardo Núñez, as Boston won, 8–4. Game 2 starter David Price held the Dodgers to two runs on three hits in six innings, while striking out five, picking up his second win of the postseason, as the Red Sox won, 4–2. Game 3 became the longest game in World Series history, both in innings (18) and by time (7 hours and 20 minutes). Nathan Eovaldi pitched six innings in relief, allowing only two hits prior to a walk-off home run by Max Muncy for a 3–2 Dodgers win. Eduardo Rodríguez started Game 4, holding the Dodgers scoreless through five innings, but then yielding four runs in the sixth. The Red Sox stormed back with help from Mitch Moreland and Steve Pearce, scoring nine runs in the final three innings, winning the game, 9–6, for a 3–1 series lead. Game 5 started with three first-inning runs, with Boston holding a 2–1 edge. There was no further scoring until the Red Sox scored one run in each of the sixth, seventh, and eighth innings. Price, pitching on short rest, held the Dodgers to one run on three hits in seven innings. Game 1 starter Chris Sale was brought in to close the ninth inning. The game ended in a 5–1 final for Boston, the franchise's fourth World Series championship in 15 years. Price got the win, his second of the World Series and third of the postseason. Pearce had three RBIs on two home runs in the game, giving him a total of three home runs and eight RBIs in the series—he was named World Series MVP. The team's motto during the season, "do damage", became "damage done" upon their victory.

Game 1, October 23 at Fenway Park

Tuesday, October 23, 2018, 8:11 pm (EDT) at Fenway Park in Boston, Massachusetts, 53 °F (12 °C), clear
Team	1	2	3	4	5	6	7	8	9	R	H	E
Los Angeles	0	1	1	0	1	0	1	0	0	4	8	0
Boston	2	0	1	0	2	0	3	0	X	8	11	0
WP: Matt Barnes (1–0) LP: Clayton Kershaw (0–1); Home runs: LAD: Matt Kemp (1); BOS: Eduardo Núñez (1); Attendance: 38,454; Boxscore

Game 2, October 24 at Fenway Park

Wednesday, October 24, 2018, 8:10 pm (EDT) at Fenway Park in Boston, Massachusetts, 47 °F (8 °C), cloudy
Team	1	2	3	4	5	6	7	8	9	R	H	E
Los Angeles	0	0	0	2	0	0	0	0	0	2	3	0
Boston	0	1	0	0	3	0	0	0	X	4	8	0
WP: David Price (1–0) LP: Hyun-jin Ryu (0–1) Sv: Craig Kimbrel (1); Attendance: 38,644; Boxscore

Game 3, October 26 at Dodger Stadium

Friday, October 26, 2018, 5:10 pm (PDT) at Dodger Stadium in Los Angeles, California, 78 °F (26 °C), clear
Team	1	2	3	4	5	6	7	8	9	10	11	12	13	14	15	16	17	18	R	H	E
Boston	0	0	0	0	0	0	0	1	0	0	0	0	1	0	0	0	0	0	2	7	1
Los Angeles	0	0	1	0	0	0	0	0	0	0	0	0	1	0	0	0	0	1	3	11	1
WP: Alex Wood (1–0) LP: Nathan Eovaldi (0–1); Home runs: BOS: Jackie Bradley Jr. (1); LAD: Joc Pederson (1), Max Muncy (1); Attendance: 53,114; Boxscore

Game 4, October 27 at Dodger Stadium

Saturday, October 27, 2018, 5:11 pm (PDT) at Dodger Stadium in Los Angeles, California, 74 °F (23 °C), clear
Team	1	2	3	4	5	6	7	8	9	R	H	E
Boston	0	0	0	0	0	0	3	1	5	9	8	1
Los Angeles	0	0	0	0	0	4	0	0	2	6	9	0
WP: Joe Kelly (1–0) LP: Dylan Floro (0–1); Home runs: BOS: Mitch Moreland (1), Steve Pearce (1); LAD: Yasiel Puig (1), Kiké Hernández (1); Attendance: 54,400; Boxscore

Game 5, October 28 at Dodger Stadium

Sunday, October 28, 2018, 5:17 pm (PDT) at Dodger Stadium in Los Angeles, California, 77 °F (25 °C), partly cloudy
Team	1	2	3	4	5	6	7	8	9	R	H	E
Boston	2	0	0	0	0	1	1	1	0	5	8	0
Los Angeles	1	0	0	0	0	0	0	0	0	1	3	0
WP: David Price (2–0) LP: Clayton Kershaw (0–2); Home runs: BOS: Steve Pearce 2 (3), Mookie Betts (1), J. D. Martinez (1); LAD: David Freese (1); Attendance: 54,367; Boxscore

=== Postseason rosters ===
Playoff rosters
American League Division Series

- Pitchers: 17 Nathan Eovaldi 22 Rick Porcello 24 David Price 32 Matt Barnes 35 Steven Wright (Game 1) 37 Heath Hembree (Games 2–4) 41 Chris Sale 44 Brandon Workman 46 Craig Kimbrel 56 Joe Kelly 57 Eduardo Rodríguez 70 Ryan Brasier
- Catchers: 3 Sandy León 7 Christian Vázquez 23 Blake Swihart
- Infielders: 2 Xander Bogaerts 5 Ian Kinsler 11 Rafael Devers 12 Brock Holt 18 Mitch Moreland 25 Steve Pearce 36 Eduardo Núñez
- Outfielders: 16 Andrew Benintendi 19 Jackie Bradley Jr. 50 Mookie Betts
- Designated hitters: 28 J. D. Martinez

American League Championship Series

- Pitchers: 17 Nathan Eovaldi 22 Rick Porcello 24 David Price 32 Matt Barnes 37 Heath Hembree 41 Chris Sale 44 Brandon Workman 46 Craig Kimbrel 56 Joe Kelly 57 Eduardo Rodríguez 70 Ryan Brasier
- Catchers: 3 Sandy León 7 Christian Vázquez 23 Blake Swihart
- Infielders: 2 Xander Bogaerts 5 Ian Kinsler 11 Rafael Devers 12 Brock Holt 18 Mitch Moreland 25 Steve Pearce 36 Eduardo Núñez
- Outfielders: 16 Andrew Benintendi 19 Jackie Bradley Jr. 50 Mookie Betts
- Designated hitters: 28 J. D. Martinez

World Series

- Pitchers: 17 Nathan Eovaldi 22 Rick Porcello 24 David Price 31 Drew Pomeranz 32 Matt Barnes 37 Heath Hembree 41 Chris Sale 46 Craig Kimbrel 56 Joe Kelly 57 Eduardo Rodríguez 70 Ryan Brasier
- Catchers: 3 Sandy León 7 Christian Vázquez 23 Blake Swihart
- Infielders: 2 Xander Bogaerts 5 Ian Kinsler 11 Rafael Devers 12 Brock Holt 18 Mitch Moreland 25 Steve Pearce 36 Eduardo Núñez
- Outfielders: 16 Andrew Benintendi 19 Jackie Bradley Jr. 50 Mookie Betts
- Designated hitters: 28 J. D. Martinez

== Season standings ==
=== American League East ===
AL East
Team	W	L	Pct.	GB	Home	Road
Boston Red Sox	108	54	.667	—	57‍–‍24	51‍–‍30
New York Yankees	100	62	.617	8	53‍–‍28	47‍–‍34
Tampa Bay Rays	90	72	.556	18	51‍–‍30	39‍–‍42
Toronto Blue Jays	73	89	.451	35	40‍–‍41	33‍–‍48
Baltimore Orioles	47	115	.290	61	28‍–‍53	19‍–‍62

=== American League Wild Card ===
Division leaders
Team	W	L	Pct.
Boston Red Sox	108	54	.667
Houston Astros	103	59	.636
Cleveland Indians	91	71	.562

Wild Card teams (Top 2 teams qualify for postseason)
Team	W	L	Pct.	GB
New York Yankees	100	62	.617	+3
Oakland Athletics	97	65	.599	—
Tampa Bay Rays	90	72	.556	7
Seattle Mariners	89	73	.549	8
Los Angeles Angels	80	82	.494	17
Minnesota Twins	78	84	.481	19
Toronto Blue Jays	73	89	.451	24
Texas Rangers	67	95	.414	30
Detroit Tigers	64	98	.395	33
Chicago White Sox	62	100	.383	35
Kansas City Royals	58	104	.358	39
Baltimore Orioles	47	115	.290	50

=== Red Sox team leaders ===
Batting
Batting average†	Mookie Betts	.346
Runs scored	Mookie Betts	129
Stolen bases	Mookie Betts	30
Home runs	J. D. Martinez	43
RBIs	J. D. Martinez	130
Pitching
Wins	Rick Porcello	17
ERA‡	David Price	3.58
WHIP‡	David Price	1.14
Strikeouts	Chris Sale	237
Saves	Craig Kimbrel	42

† Minimum 3.1 plate appearances per team games played
AVG qualified batters: Benintendi, Betts, Bogaerts, Bradley, Martinez, Nuñez
‡ Minimum 1 inning pitched per team games played
ERA & WHIP qualified pitchers: Porcello, Price

=== Record against opponents ===
2018 American League record Source: MLB Standings Grid – 2018
Team	BAL	BOS	CWS	CLE	DET	HOU	KC	LAA	MIN	NYY	OAK	SEA	TB	TEX	TOR	NL
Baltimore	—	3–16	3–4	2–5	2–4	1–6	2–4	1–5	1–6	7–12	1–5	1–6	8–11	3–4	5–14	7–13
Boston	16–3	—	3–4	3–4	4–2	3–4	5–1	6–0	4–3	10–9	2–4	4–3	11–8	6–1	15–4	16–4
Chicago	4–3	4–3	—	5–14	7–12	0–7	11–8	2–5	7–12	2–4	2–5	2–4	4–2	4–3	2–4	6–14
Cleveland	5–2	4–3	14–5	—	13–6	3–4	12–7	3–3	10–9	2–5	2–4	2–5	2–4	4–2	3–4	12–8
Detroit	4–2	2–4	12–7	6–13	—	1–5	8–11	3–4	7–12	3–4	0–7	3–4	2–4	3–4	4–3	6–14
Houston	6–1	4–3	7–0	4–3	5–1	—	5–1	13–6	4–2	2–5	12–7	9–10	3–4	12–7	4–2	13–7
Kansas City	4–2	1–5	8–11	7–12	11–8	1–5	—	1–6	10–9	2–5	2–5	1–5	0–7	2–5	2–5	6–14
Los Angeles	5–1	0–6	5–2	3–3	4–3	6–13	6–1	—	4–3	1–5	10–9	8–11	1–6	13–6	4–3	10–10
Minnesota	6–1	3–4	12–7	9–10	12–7	2–4	9–10	3–4	—	2–5	2–5	1–5	3–4	2–4	4–2	8–12
New York	12–7	9–10	4–2	5–2	4–3	5–2	5–2	5–1	5–2	—	3–3	5–1	10–9	4–3	13–6	11–9
Oakland	5–1	4–2	5–2	4–2	7–0	7–12	5–2	9–10	5–2	3–3	—	9–10	2–5	13–6	7–0	12–8
Seattle	6–1	3–4	4–2	5–2	4–3	10–9	5–1	11–8	5–1	1–5	10–9	—	6–1	10–9	3–4	6–14
Tampa Bay	11–8	8–11	2–4	4–2	4–2	4–3	7–0	6–1	4–3	9–10	5–2	1–6	—	5–1	13–6	7–13
Texas	4–3	1–6	3–4	2–4	4–3	7–12	5–2	6–13	4–2	3–4	6–13	9–10	1–5	—	3–3	9–11
Toronto	14–5	4–15	4–2	4–3	3–4	2–4	5–2	3–4	2–4	6–13	0–7	4–3	6–13	3–3	—	13–7

Red Sox vs. National League East
Team	ATL	MIA	NYM	PHI	WSH
Boston	5–1	4–0	2–1	2–2	3–0

== Roster ==
2018 Boston Red Sox
Roster
Pitchers: 32 Matt Barnes; 68 Jalen Beeks; 70 Ryan Brasier; 67 William Cuevas; 17 Nathan Eovaldi; 65 Justin Haley; 37 Heath Hembree; 61 Brian Johnson; 56 Joe Kelly; 46 Craig Kimbrel; 31 Drew Pomeranz; 22 Rick Porcello; 66 Bobby Poyner; 24 David Price; 57 Eduardo Rodríguez; 41 Chris Sale; 63 Robby Scott; 39 Carson Smith; 47 Tyler Thornburg; 76 Héctor Velázquez; 64 Marcus Walden; 44 Brandon Workman; 35 Steven Wright	Catchers: 68 Dan Butler; 3 Sandy León; 23 Blake Swihart; 7 Christian Vázquez; Infielders: 2 Xander Bogaerts; 11 Rafael Devers; 12 Brock Holt; 5 Ian Kinsler; 5,30 Tzu-Wei Lin; 18 Mitch Moreland; 36 Eduardo Núñez; 25 Steve Pearce; 0 Brandon Phillips; 15 Dustin Pedroia; 13 Hanley Ramírez; 38 Tony Renda; 59 Sam Travis	Outfielders: 16 Andrew Benintendi; 50 Mookie Betts; 19 Jackie Bradley Jr.; 28 J. D. Martinez	Manager: 20 Alex Cora; Coaches: 86 Brian Bannister (assistant pitching); 58 Andy Barkett (assistant hitting); 53 Craig Bjornson (bullpen/catching); 87 Mike Brenly (bullpen catcher); 52 Carlos Febles (third base); 82 Tom Goodwin (first base/outfield); 51 Tim Hyers (hitting); 60 Dana LeVangie (pitching); 88 Mani Martinez (bullpen catcher); 10 Ron Roenicke (bench); 84 Ramón Vázquez (coach)

=== MLB debuts ===
Red Sox players who made their MLB debuts during the 2018 regular season:

- March 31: Bobby Poyner
- April 1: Marcus Walden
- June 7: Jalen Beeks

=== Transactions ===
Notable transactions of/for players on the 40-man roster during the 2018 regular season:

- April 23: Pitcher Roenis Elías was traded to the Seattle Mariners for cash or a PTBNL; the Red Sox later received minor league OF/1B Eric Filia; however, he failed his physical and was returned to the Mariners, with cash considerations completing the trade.
- May 25: First baseman Hanley Ramírez was designated for assignment.
- June 28: OF/1B Steve Pearce was acquired from the Toronto Blue Jays for minor league infielder Santiago Espinal.
- July 25: Pitcher Jalen Beeks was traded to the Tampa Bay Rays for pitcher Nathan Eovaldi.
- July 30: Second baseman Ian Kinsler was acquired from the Los Angeles Angels for Triple-A pitchers Ty Buttrey and Williams Jerez.

=== Amateur draft ===
Boston's first 15 selections in the 2018 MLB draft, held on June 4–6, are listed below.

Round	Pick	Player	Position	B/T	Class	School	Sign date
1	26	Triston Casas	Infielder	L/R	HS JR	American Heritage School (FL)	June 14
2	64	Nick Decker	Outfielder	L/L	HS SR	Seneca High School (NJ)	June 21
3	100	Durbin Feltman	Pitcher	R/R	4YR JR	TCU	June 14
4	130	Kole Cottam	Catcher	R/R	4YR JR	Kentucky	June 14
5	160	Thad Ward	Pitcher	R/R	4YR JR	Central Florida	June 15
6	190	Devlin Granberg	Outfielder	R/R	4YR SR	Dallas Baptist	June 14
7	220	Jarren Duran	Second baseman	L/R	4YR JR	Cal State Long Beach	June 14
8	250	Elih Marrero†	Catcher	S/R	4YR JR	St. Thomas University (FL)	June 21
9	280	Brian Brown	Pitcher	L/L	4YR SR	NC State	June 14
10	310	Grant Williams	Second baseman	L/R	4YR SR	Kennesaw State (GA)	June 14
11	340	Nicholas Northcut	Pitcher	R/R	HS SR	William Mason High School (OH)	June 15
12	370	Chase Shugart	Pitcher	R/R	4YR JR	Texas	July 6
13	400	Dylan Hardy	Outfielder	R/R	4YR JR	South Alabama	June 15
14	430	Nicholas Lucky	Second baseman	L/R	HS SR	Cocalico High School (PA)	DNS ‡
15	460	Andrew Politi	Pitcher	R/R	4YR SR	Seton Hall (NJ)	June 14

† Elih Marrero is the son of former MLB player Eli Marrero.
‡ Nicholas Lucky did not sign; he chose to attend Coastal Carolina.

== Game log ==
Red Sox Win	Red Sox Loss	Game postponed	Clinched Playoff Spot	Clinched Division

2018 Boston Red Sox Season Game Log: 108–54 (Home: 57–24; Away: 51–30)
March / April: 21–7 (Home: 10–3; Away: 11–4)

#	Date	Opponent	Score	Win	Loss	Save	Stadium	Attendance	Record	Box/ Streak
1	March 29	@ Rays	4–6	Pruitt (1–0)	Smith (0–1)	Colomé (1)	Tropicana Field	31,042	0–1	L1
2	March 30	@ Rays	1–0	Price (1–0)	Roe (0–1)	Kimbrel (1)	Tropicana Field	19,203	1–1	W1
3	March 31	@ Rays	3–2	Porcello (1–0)	Kittredge (0–1)	Kimbrel (2)	Tropicana Field	17,838	2–1	W2
4	April 1	@ Rays	2–1	Velázquez (1–0)	Alvarado (0–1)	Kelly (1)	Tropicana Field	14,256	3–1	W3
5	April 2	@ Marlins	7–3	Johnson (1–0)	Richards (0–1)	—	Marlins Park	11,113	4–1	W4
6	April 3	@ Marlins	4–2 (13)	Hembree (1–0)	Guerrero (0–1)	—	Marlins Park	14,953	5–1	W5
7	April 5	Rays	3–2 (12)	Poyner (1–0)	Kittredge (0–2)	—	Fenway Park	36,134	6–1	W6
8	April 7	Rays	10–3	Porcello (2–0)	Faria (0–1)	—	Fenway Park	31,821	7–1	W7
9	April 8	Rays	8–7	Smith (1–1)	Colomé (0–1)	Kimbrel (3)	Fenway Park	31,979	8–1	W8
10	April 10	Yankees	14–1	Sale (1–0)	Severino (2–1)	—	Fenway Park	32,357	9–1	W9
11	April 11	Yankees	7–10	Tanaka (2–1)	Price (1–1)	—	Fenway Park	32,400	9–2	L1
12	April 12	Yankees	6–3	Porcello (3–0)	Gray (1–1)	Kimbrel (4)	Fenway Park	36,341	10–2	W1
13	April 13	Orioles	7–3	Rodríguez (1–0)	Tillman (0–3)	—	Fenway Park	32,610	11–2	W2
14	April 14	Orioles	10–3	Velázquez (2–0)	Cobb (0–1)	Walden (1)	Fenway Park	33,584	12–2	W3
15	April 15	Orioles	3–1	Hembree (2–0)	Bundy (0–2)	Kimbrel (5)	Fenway Park	32,489	13–2	W4
—	April 16	Orioles	Postponed (rain). Makeup date May 17.							
16	April 17	@ Angels	10–1	Price (2–1)	Ohtani (2–1)	—	Angel Stadium	44,822	14–2	W5
17	April 18	@ Angels	9–0	Porcello (4–0)	Skaggs (2–1)	—	Angel Stadium	34,508	15–2	W6
18	April 19	@ Angels	8–2	Rodríguez (2–0)	Tropeano (1–1)	—	Angel Stadium	36,253	16–2	W7
19	April 20	@ Athletics	7–3	Velázquez (3–0)	Graveman (0–4)	—	Oakland Coliseum	23,473	17–2	W8
20	April 21	@ Athletics	0–3	Manaea (3–2)	Sale (1–1)	—	Oakland Coliseum	25,746	17–3	L1
21	April 22	@ Athletics	1–4	Treinen (1–1)	Price (2–2)	—	Oakland Coliseum	29,804	17–4	L2
22	April 24	@ Blue Jays	3–4 (10)	Clippard (3–0)	Kimbrel (0–1)	—	Rogers Centre	20,070	17–5	L3
23	April 25	@ Blue Jays	4–3	Rodríguez (3–0)	Barnes (1–1)	Kimbrel (6)	Rogers Centre	18,914	18–5	W1
24	April 26	@ Blue Jays	5–4	Sale (2–1)	Estrada (2–2)	Kimbrel (7)	Rogers Centre	23,571	19–5	W2
25	April 27	Rays	3–4	Snell (4–1)	Pomeranz (0–1)	Colomé (5)	Fenway Park	32,620	19–6	L1
26	April 28	Rays	6–12	Yarbrough (1–1)	Price (2–3)	—	Fenway Park	35,795	19–7	L2
27	April 29	Rays	4–3	Kimbrel (1–1)	Colomé (2–3)	—	Fenway Park	32,888	20–7	W1
28	April 30	Royals	10–6	Velázquez (4–0)	Hammel (0–3)	—	Fenway Park	31,314	21–7	W2

May: 18–11 (Home: 10–5; Away: 8–6)

#	Date	Opponent	Score	Win	Loss	Save	Stadium	Attendance	Record	Box/ Streak
29	May 1	Royals	6–7 (13)	Herrera (1–0)	Johnson (1–1)	Flynn (1)	Fenway Park	34,466	21–8	L1
30	May 2	Royals	5–4	Pomeranz (1–1)	Duffy (0–4)	Kimbrel (8)	Fenway Park	32,267	22–8	W1
31	May 3	@ Rangers	5–11	Minor (3–1)	Price (2–4)	—	Globe Life Park	22,348	22–9	L1
32	May 4	@ Rangers	5–1	Porcello (5–0)	Colón (1–1)	—	Globe Life Park	31,404	23–9	W1
33	May 5	@ Rangers	6–5	Kelly (1–0)	Kela (2–2)	Kimbrel (9)	Globe Life Park	35,728	24–9	W2
34	May 6	@ Rangers	6–1	Sale (2–1)	Fister (1–3)	—	Globe Life Park	28,360	25–9	W3
35	May 8	@ Yankees	2–3	Robertson (3–1)	Hembree (2–1)	Chapman (8)	Yankee Stadium	45,773	25–10	L1
36	May 9	@ Yankees	6–9	Holder (1–1)	Barnes (0–1)	Chapman (9)	Yankee Stadium	47,088	25–11	L2
37	May 10	@ Yankees	5–4	Kelly (2–0)	Betances (1–2)	Kimbrel (10)	Yankee Stadium	46,899	26–11	W1
38	May 11	@ Blue Jays	3–5 (12)	Gaviglio (1–0)	Johnson (1–2)	—	Rogers Centre	28,695	26–12	L1
39	May 12	@ Blue Jays	5–2	Price (3–4)	Estrada (2–3)	Kimbrel (11)	Rogers Centre	37,588	27–12	W1
40	May 13	@ Blue Jays	5–3	Velázquez (5–0)	Biagini (0–2)	Kelly (2)	Rogers Centre	37,888	28–12	W2
41	May 14	Athletics	5–6	Manaea (5–4)	Porcello (5–1)	Treinen (7)	Fenway Park	35,249	28–13	L1
42	May 15	Athletics	3–5	Mengden (3–4)	Rodríguez (3–1)	Treinen (8)	Fenway Park	34,906	28–14	L2
43	May 16	Athletics	6–4	Sale (4–1)	Cahill (1–2)	Kimbrel (12)	Fenway Park	34,947	29–14	W1
44	May 17	Orioles	6–2	Price (4–4)	Gausman (3–3)	—	Fenway Park	36,615	30–14	W2
45	May 18	Orioles	4–7	Cobb (1–5)	Pomeranz (1–2)	Brach (6)	Fenway Park	34,935	30–15	L1
46	May 19	Orioles	6–3	Porcello (6–1)	Bundy (2–6)	Kimbrel (13)	Fenway Park	34,195	31–15	W1
47	May 20	Orioles	5–0	Rodríguez (4–1)	Hess (1–1)	—	Fenway Park	35,550	32–15	W2
48	May 22	@ Rays	4–2	Sale (5–1)	Faria (3–3)	Kimbrel (14)	Tropicana Field	10,642	33–15	W3
49	May 23	@ Rays	4–1	Kelly (3–0)	Colomé (2–5)	Kimbrel (15)	Tropicana Field	10,194	34–15	W4
50	May 24	@ Rays	3–6	Snell (6–3)	Porcello (6–2)	Colomé (11)	Tropicana Field	12,468	34–16	L1
51	May 25	Braves	6–2	Rodríguez (5–1)	Teherán (4–2)	—	Fenway Park	37,008	35–16	W1
52	May 26	Braves	8–6	Wright (1–0)	Freeman (1–2)	Kimbrel (16)	Fenway Park	36,510	36–16	W2
53	May 27	Braves	1–7	Foltynewicz (4–3)	Sale (5–2)	—	Fenway Park	36,543	36–17	L1
54	May 28	Blue Jays	8–3	Price (5–4)	Sanchez (2–5)	—	Fenway Park	34,700	37–17	W1
55	May 29	Blue Jays	8–3	Porcello (7–2)	Estrada (2–6)	Kimbrel (17)	Fenway Park	33,380	38–17	W2
56	May 30	Blue Jays	6–4	Rodríguez (6–1)	Gaviglio (2–1)	Kimbrel (18)	Fenway Park	33,451	39–17	W3
57	May 31	@ Astros	2–4	McCullers (7–3)	Pomeranz (1–3)	Giles (10)	Minute Maid Park	30,658	39–18	L1

June: 17–10 (Home: 8–4; Away: 9–6)

#	Date	Opponent	Score	Win	Loss	Save	Stadium	Attendance	Record	Box/ Streak
58	June 1	@ Astros	3–7	Cole (6–1)	Sale (5–3)	—	Minute Maid Park	37,244	39–19	L2
59	June 2	@ Astros	5–4	Price (6–4)	Harris (1–3)	Kimbrel (19)	Minute Maid Park	38,640	40–19	W1
60	June 3	@ Astros	9–3	Porcello (8–2)	Morton (7–1)	—	Minute Maid Park	33,431	41–19	W2
61	June 5	Tigers	6–0	Wright (2–0)	Lewicki (0–1)	—	Fenway Park	34,762	42–19	W3
62	June 6	Tigers	7–1	Rodríguez (7–1)	Hardy (2–1)	—	Fenway Park	35,182	43–19	W4
63	June 7	Tigers	2–7	Boyd (4–4)	Beeks (0–1)	—	Fenway Park	36,556	43–20	L1
64	June 8	White Sox	0–1	Covey (2–1)	Sale (5–4)	Soria (7)	Fenway Park	36,593	43–21	L2
65	June 9	White Sox	4–2	Price (7–4)	Rondón (0–1)	Kimbrel (20)	Fenway Park	36,675	44–21	W1
66	June 10	White Sox	2–5	López (2–4)	Porcello (8–3)	Soria (8)	Fenway Park	36,998	44–22	L1
67	June 11	@ Orioles	2–0 (12)	Hembree (3–1)	Givens (0–3)	Kimbrel (21)	Camden Yards	15,934	45–22	W1
68	June 12	@ Orioles	6–4	Rodríguez (8–1)	Hess (2–3)	—	Camden Yards	21,837	46–22	W2
69	June 13	@ Orioles	5–1	Sale (6–4)	Ramírez (0–1)	—	Camden Yards	17,217	47–22	W3
70	June 14	@ Mariners	2–1	Price (8–4)	Hernández (6–6)	Kimbrel (22)	Safeco Field	30,479	48–22	W4
71	June 15	@ Mariners	6–7	Cook (1–0)	Barnes (0–2)	Díaz (26)	Safeco Field	44,459	48–23	L1
72	June 16	@ Mariners	0–1	LeBlanc (3–0)	Wright (2–1)	Díaz (27)	Safeco Field	44,151	48–24	L2
73	June 17	@ Mariners	9–3	Rodríguez (9–1)	Leake (7–4)	—	Safeco Field	46,462	49–24	W1
74	June 19	@ Twins	2–6	Duke (3–2)	Scott (0–1)	—	Target Field	28,550	49–25	L1
75	June 20	@ Twins	1–4	Lynn (5–5)	Price (8–5)	Rodney (16)	Target Field	33,153	49–26	L2
76	June 21	@ Twins	9–2	Porcello (9–3)	Gibson (2–5)	—	Target Field	32,631	50–26	W1
77	June 22	Mariners	14–10	Barnes (1–2)	Nicasio (1–4)	—	Fenway Park	37,342	51–26	W2
78	June 23	Mariners	2–7	Leake (8–4)	Rodríguez (9–2)	—	Fenway Park	36,051	51–27	L1
79	June 24	Mariners	5–0	Sale (7–4)	Gonzales (7–5)	—	Fenway Park	36,274	52–27	W1
80	June 26	Angels	9–1	Price (9–5)	Lamb (0–1)	—	Fenway Park	37,366	53–27	W2
81	June 27	Angels	9–6	Barnes (2–2)	Álvarez (3–3)	Kimbrel (23)	Fenway Park	37,521	54–27	W3
82	June 28	Angels	4–2	Velázquez (6–0)	Barría (5–4)	Kimbrel (24)	Fenway Park	36,992	55–27	W4
83	June 29	@ Yankees	1–8	Sabathia (5–3)	Rodríguez (9–3)	—	Yankee Stadium	47,120	55–28	L1
84	June 30	@ Yankees	11–0	Sale (8–4)	Gray (5–6)	—	Yankee Stadium	47,125	56–28	W1

July: 19–6 (Home: 10–3; Away: 9–3)

#	Date	Opponent	Score	Win	Loss	Save	Stadium	Attendance	Record	Box/ Streak
85	July 1	@ Yankees	1–11	Severino (13–2)	Price (9–6)	—	Yankee Stadium	46,795	56–29	L1
86	July 2	@ Nationals	4–3	Porcello (10–3)	Scherzer (10–5)	Kimbrel (25)	Nationals Park	39,002	57–29	W1
87	July 3	@ Nationals	11–4	Workman (1–0)	Roark (3–10)	—	Nationals Park	42,531	58–29	W2
88	July 4	@ Nationals	3–0	Rodríguez (10–3)	Madson (2–4)	Kimbrel (26)	Nationals Park	42,528	59–29	W3
89	July 6	@ Royals	10–5	Sale (9–4)	Hammel (2–11)	—	Kauffman Stadium	24,673	60–29	W4
90	July 7	@ Royals	15–4	Hembree (4–1)	Adam (0–2)	—	Kauffman Stadium	30,347	61–29	W5
91	July 8	@ Royals	7–4	Porcello (11–3)	Fillmyer (0–1)	Kimbrel (27)	Kauffman Stadium	28,443	62–29	W6
92	July 9	Rangers	5–0	Rodríguez (11–3)	Minor (6–5)	—	Fenway Park	36,754	63–29	W7
93	July 10	Rangers	8–4	Barnes (3–2)	Gallardo (3–1)	—	Fenway Park	36,883	64–29	W8
94	July 11	Rangers	4–2	Sale (10–4)	Colón (5–7)	Kimbrel (28)	Fenway Park	36,920	65–29	W9
95	July 12	Blue Jays	6–4	Price (10–6)	Happ (10–6)	Kimbrel (29)	Fenway Park	37,182	66–29	W10
96	July 13	Blue Jays	7–13	Petricka (1–0)	Porcello (11–4)	—	Fenway Park	37,018	66–30	L1
97	July 14	Blue Jays	6–2 (10)	Kimbrel (2–1)	Rowley (0–1)	—	Fenway Park	36,390	67–30	W1
98	July 15	Blue Jays	5–2	Workman (2–0)	Stroman (2–7)	Kimbrel (30)	Fenway Park	36,940	68–30	W2
99	July 20	@ Tigers	1–0	Price (11–6)	Boyd (4–9)	Kimbrel (31)	Comerica Park	33,817	69–30	W3
100	July 21	@ Tigers	0–5	Fiers (7–6)	Johnson (1–3)	—	Comerica Park	31,682	69–31	L1
101	July 22	@ Tigers	9–1	Sale (11–4)	Hardy (3–3)	—	Comerica Park	25,012	70–31	W1
102	July 23	@ Orioles	5–3	Porcello (12–4)	Gausman (4–8)	Kimbrel (32)	Camden Yards	16,885	71–31	W2
103	July 24	@ Orioles	6–7	Ramírez (1–3)	Pomeranz (1–4)	Brach (11)	Camden Yards	13,342	71–32	L1
—	July 25	@ Orioles	Postponed (rain). Makeup date August 11.							
104	July 26	Twins	1–2	Gibson (5–7)	Barnes (3–3)	Rodney (22)	Fenway Park	37,439	71–33	L2
105	July 27	Twins	4–3 (10)	Thornburg (1–0)	Belisle (1–1)	—	Fenway Park	37,273	72–33	W1
106	July 28	Twins	10–4	Porcello (13–4)	Odorizzi (4–7)	—	Fenway Park	36,798	73–33	W2
107	July 29	Twins	3–0	Eovaldi (4–4)	Berríos (10–8)	Kimbrel (33)	Fenway Park	36,785	74–33	W3
108	July 30	Phillies	2–1 (13)	Velázquez (7–0)	Davis (1–1)	—	Fenway Park	37,722	75–33	W4
109	July 31	Phillies	1–3	Arrieta (9–6)	Pomeranz (1–5)	Domínguez (11)	Fenway Park	37,816	75–34	L1

August: 18–9 (Home: 10–3; Away: 8–6)

#	Date	Opponent	Score	Win	Loss	Save	Stadium	Attendance	Record	Box/ Streak
110	Aug 2	Yankees	15–7	Johnson (2–3)	Holder (1–2)	—	Fenway Park	37,317	76–34	W1
111	Aug 3	Yankees	4–1	Porcello (14–4)	Severino (14–5)	—	Fenway Park	37,231	77–34	W2
112	August 4	Yankees	4–1	Eovaldi (5–4)	Adams (0–1)	—	Fenway Park	36,699	78–34	W3
113	August 5	Yankees	5–4 (10)	Barnes (4–3)	Holder (1–3)	—	Fenway Park	37,830	79–34	W4
114	August 7	@ Blue Jays	10–7 (10)	Kimbrel (3–1)	Giles (0–3)	—	Rogers Centre	31,855	80–34	W5
115	August 8	@ Blue Jays	10–5	Johnson (3–3)	Hauschild (1–1)	—	Rogers Centre	36,798	81–34	W6
116	August 9	@ Blue Jays	5–8	Borucki (2–2)	Porcello (14–5)	—	Rogers Centre	28,415	81–35	L1
117	August 10	@ Orioles	19–12	Pomeranz (2–5)	Castro (2–7)	—	Camden Yards	23,649	82–35	W1
118	August 11 (1)	@ Orioles	5–0	Price (12–6)	Yacabonis (0–1)	—	Camden Yards	18,003	83–35	W2
119	August 11 (2)	@ Orioles	6–4	Kelly (4–0)	Wright (3–1)	Kimbrel (34)	Camden Yards	24,051	84–35	W3
120	August 12	@ Orioles	4–1	Sale (12–4)	Cobb (3–15)	Kimbrel (35)	Camden Yards	25,303	85–35	W4
121	August 14	@ Phillies	2–1	Porcello (15–5)	Hunter (3–2)	Kimbrel (36)	Citizens Bank Park	33,081	86–35	W5
122	August 15	@ Phillies	4–7	Hunter (4–2)	Kelly (4–1)	Domínguez (13)	Citizens Bank Park	35,266	86–36	L1
123	August 17	Rays	7–3	Johnson (4–3)	Chirinos (1–5)	—	Fenway Park	37,012	87–36	W1
124	August 18	Rays	5–2	Price (13–6)	Glasnow (1–3)	Kimbrel (37)	Fenway Park	36,654	88–36	W2
125	August 19	Rays	0–2	Beeks (2–1)	Velázquez (7–1)	Romo (16)	Fenway Park	37,242	88–37	L1
126	August 20	Indians	4–5	Kluber (16–6)	Porcello (15–6)	Allen (25)	Fenway Park	37,274	88–38	L2
127	August 21	Indians	3–6	Bieber (7–2)	Eovaldi (5–5)	Hand (29)	Fenway Park	37,188	88–39	L3
128	August 22	Indians	10–4	Barnes (5–3)	Carrasco (15–7)	—	Fenway Park	37,107	89–39	W1
129	August 23	Indians	7–0	Price (14–6)	Plutko (4–4)	—	Fenway Park	37,396	90–39	W2
130	August 24	@ Rays	3–10	Beeks (3–1)	Velázquez (7–2)	—	Tropicana Field	19,723	90–40	L1
131	August 25	@ Rays	1–5	Stanek (2–3)	Porcello (15–7)	—	Tropicana Field	25,695	90–41	L2
132	August 26	@ Rays	1–9	Snell (16–5)	Eovaldi (5–6)	—	Tropicana Field	23,448	90–42	L3
133	August 28	Marlins	8–7	Kimbrel (4–1)	Steckenrider (4–3)	—	Fenway Park	36,708	91–42	W1
134	August 29	Marlins	14–6	Thornburg (2–0)	Conley (3–4)	—	Fenway Park	36,628	92–42	W2
135	August 30	@ White Sox	9–4	Brasier (1–0)	Vieira (1–1)	—	Guaranteed Rate Field	18,015	93–42	W3
136	August 31	@ White Sox	1–6	Covey (5–12)	Eovaldi (5–7)	—	Guaranteed Rate Field	23,625	93–43	L1

September: 15–11 (Home: 9–6; Away: 6–5)

#	Date	Opponent	Score	Win	Loss	Save	Stadium	Attendance	Record	Box/ Streak
137	September 1	@ White Sox	6–1	Rodríguez (12–3)	Rodón (6–4)	—	Guaranteed Rate Field	22,639	94–43	W1
138	September 2	@ White Sox	0–8	Shields (6–15)	Johnson (4–4)	—	Guaranteed Rate Field	30,745	94–44	L1
139	September 3	@ Braves	8–2	Workman (3–0)	Toussaint (1–1)	—	SunTrust Park	40,394	95–44	W1
140	September 4	@ Braves	5–1	Porcello (16–7)	Newcomb (11–8)	—	SunTrust Park	35,333	96–44	W2
141	September 5	@ Braves	9–8	Workman (4–0)	Minter (4–3)	Kimbrel (38)	SunTrust Park	28,386	97–44	W3
142	September 7	Astros	3–6	Pressly (2–1)	Kelly (4–2)	Osuna (14)	Fenway Park	36,930	97–45	L1
143	September 8	Astros	3–5	Morton (14–3)	Rodríguez (12–4)	Osuna (15)	Fenway Park	36,684	97–46	L2
144	September 9	Astros	6–5	Kimbrel (5–1)	Rondón (2–3)	—	Fenway Park	32,787	98–46	W1
145	September 11	Blue Jays	7–2	Brasier (2–0)	Tepera (5–5)	—	Fenway Park	34,747	99–46	W2
146	September 12	Blue Jays	1–0	Price (15–6)	Sanchez (4–6)	Kimbrel (39)	Fenway Park	35,178	100–46	W3
147	September 13	Blue Jays	4–3	Workman (5–0)	Barnes (3–3)	Kimbrel (40)	Fenway Park	36,427	101–46	W4
148	September 14	Mets	0–8	Syndergaard (12–3)	Cuevas (0–1)	—	Fenway Park	37,117	101–47	L1
149	September 15	Mets	5–3	Porcello (17–7)	Sewald (0–6)	Kimbrel (41)	Fenway Park	36,611	102–47	W1
150	September 16	Mets	4–3	Workman (6–0)	Lugo (3–4)	Wright (1)	Fenway Park	36,526	103–47	W2
151	September 18	@ Yankees	2–3	Green (8–2)	Workman (6–1)	Britton (6)	Yankee Stadium	38,695	103–48	L1
152	September 19	@ Yankees	1–10	Severino (18–8)	Price (15–7)	—	Yankee Stadium	43,297	103–49	L2
153	September 20	@ Yankees	11–6	Wright (3–1)	Green (8–3)	—	Yankee Stadium	47,351	104–49	W1
154	September 21	@ Indians	7–5	Barnes (6–3)	Bieber (10–5)	Kimbrel (42)	Progressive Field	27,892	105–49	W2
155	September 22	@ Indians	4–5 (11)	Olson (2–1)	Pomeranz (2–6)	—	Progressive Field	35,095	105–50	L1
156	September 23	@ Indians	3–4 (11)	Tomlin (2–5)	Cuevas (0–2)	—	Progressive Field	27,879	105–51	L2
157	September 24	Orioles	6–2	Eovaldi (6–7)	Bundy (8–16)	—	Fenway Park	35,619	106–51	W1
—	September 25	Orioles	Postponed (rain). Makeup date September 26.							
158	September 26 (1)	Orioles	19–3	Price (16–7)	Meisinger (2–1)	—	Fenway Park	33,577	107–51	W2
159	September 26 (2)	Orioles	3–10	Scott (3–2)	Barnes (6–4)	Fry (2)	Fenway Park	34,445	107–52	L1
160	September 28	Yankees	6–11	Happ (17–6)	Johnson (4–5)	—	Fenway Park	36,779	107–53	L2
161	September 29	Yankees	5–8	Lynn (10–10)	Rodríguez (12–5)	Chapman (32)	Fenway Park	36,375	107–54	L3
162	September 30	Yankees	10–2	Rodríguez (13–5)	Cessa (1–4)	—	Fenway Park	36,201	108–54	W1

=== Postseason game log ===
Boston Red Sox 2018 Postseason Game Log (11–3)
American League Division Series vs. New York Yankees (3–1)

#/	Date	Opponent	Score	Win	Loss	Save	Stadium	Attendance	Series	Box/ Streak
1	October 5	Yankees	5–4	Sale (1–0)	Happ (0–1)	Kimbrel (1)	Fenway Park	39,059	1–0	W1
2	October 6	Yankees	2–6	Tanaka (1–0)	Price (0–1)	—	Fenway Park	39,151	1–1	L1
3	October 8	@ Yankees	16–1	Eovaldi (1–0)	Severino (0–1)	—	Yankee Stadium	49,657	2–1	W1
4	October 9	@ Yankees	4–3	Porcello (1–0)	Sabathia (0–1)	Kimbrel (2)	Yankee Stadium	49,641	3–1	W2
Red Sox Win Series 3–1

American League Championship Series vs. Houston Astros (4–1)

#	Date	Opponent	Score	Win	Loss	Save	Stadium	Attendance	Series	Box/ Streak
1	October 13	Astros	2–7	Verlander (1–0)	Kelly (0–1)	—	Fenway Park	38,007	0–1	L1
2	October 14	Astros	7–5	Barnes (1–0)	Cole (0–1)	Kimbrel (1)	Fenway Park	37,960	1–1	W1
3	October 16	@ Astros	8–2	Eovaldi (1–0)	Smith (0–1)	—	Minute Maid Park	43,102	2–1	W2
4	October 17	@ Astros	8–6	Kelly (1–1)	James (0–1)	Kimbrel (2)	Minute Maid Park	43,277	3–1	W3
5	October 18	@ Astros	4–1	Price (1–0)	Verlander (1–1)	Kimbrel (3)	Minute Maid Park	43,210	4–1	W4
Red Sox Win Series 4–1

World Series vs. Los Angeles Dodgers (4–1)

#	Date	Opponent	Score	Win	Loss	Save	Stadium	Attendance	Series	Box/ Streak
1	October 23	Dodgers	8–4	Barnes (1–0)	Kershaw (0–1)	—	Fenway Park	38,454	1–0	W1
2	October 24	Dodgers	4–2	Price (1–0)	Ryu (0–1)	Kimbrel (1)	Fenway Park	38,644	2–0	W2
3	October 26	@ Dodgers	2–3 (18)	Wood (1–0)	Eovaldi (0–1)	—	Dodger Stadium	53,114	2–1	L1
4	October 27	@ Dodgers	9–6	Kelly (1–0)	Floro (0–1)	—	Dodger Stadium	54,400	3–1	W1
5	October 28	@ Dodgers	5–1	Price (2–0)	Kershaw (0–2)	—	Dodger Stadium	54,367	4–1	W2
Red Sox win World Series 4–1

=== Grand slams ===
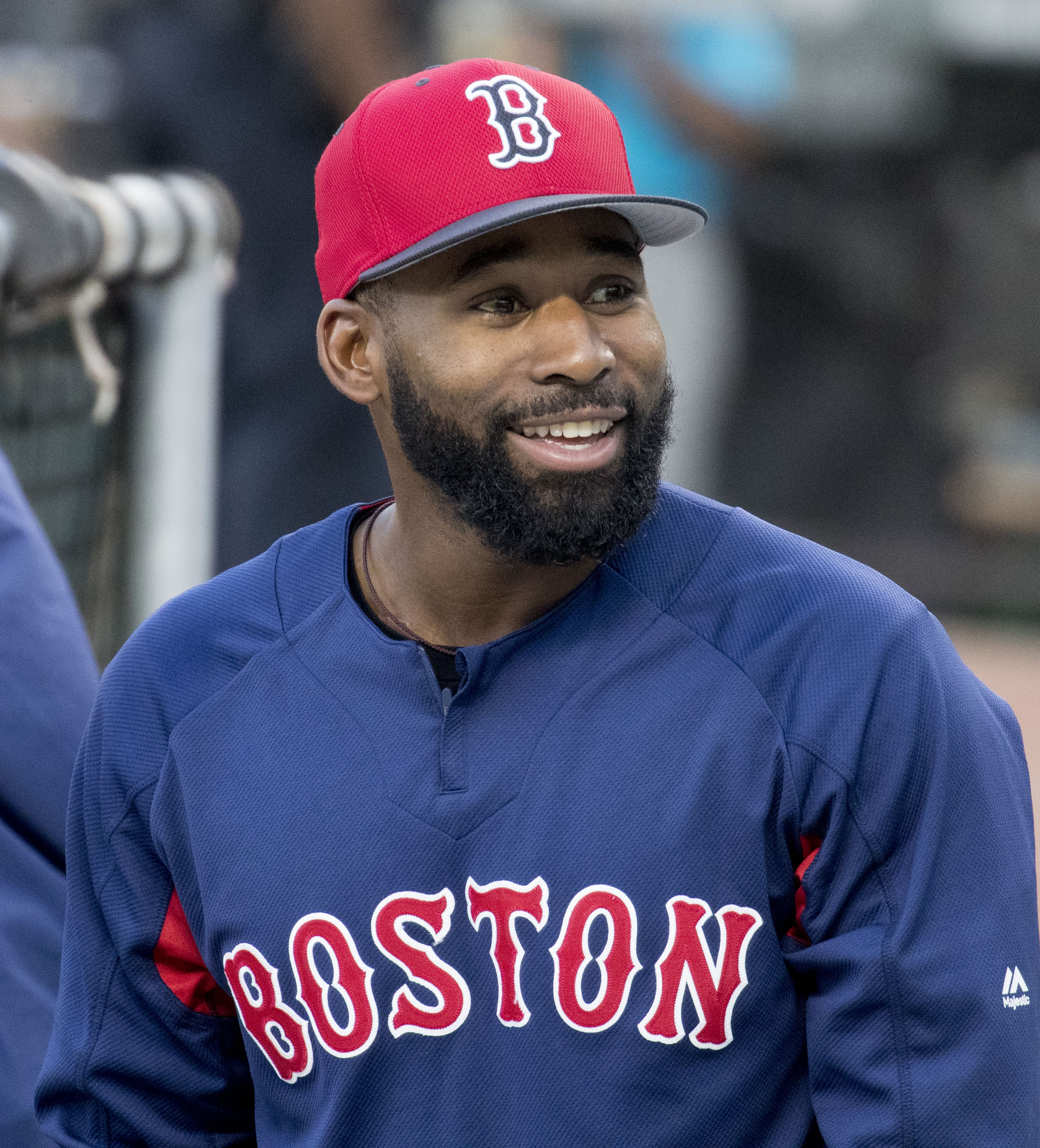
Jackie Bradley Jr. had a grand slam in ALCS Game 3.

No.	Date	Red Sox batter	H/A	Pitcher	Opponent
1	April 7	Xander Bogaerts	Home	Jacob Faria	Tampa Bay Rays
2	April 10	Mookie Betts	Home	Chasen Shreve	New York Yankees
3	April 11	J. D. Martinez	Home	Masahiro Tanaka	New York Yankees
4	April 18	Rafael Devers	Away	Tyler Skaggs	Los Angeles Angels
5	April 20	Mitch Moreland	Away	Emilio Pagán	Oakland Athletics
6	April 30	Xander Bogaerts	Home	Jason Hammel	Kansas City Royals
7	June 30	Rafael Devers	Away	Sonny Gray	New York Yankees
8	July 12	Mookie Betts	Home	J. A. Happ	Toronto Blue Jays
9	July 14	Xander Bogaerts	Home	Chris Rowley	Toronto Blue Jays
10	September 28	Steve Pearce	Home	J. A. Happ	New York Yankees
11	October 16†	Jackie Bradley Jr.	Away	Roberto Osuna	Houston Astros

† postseason game

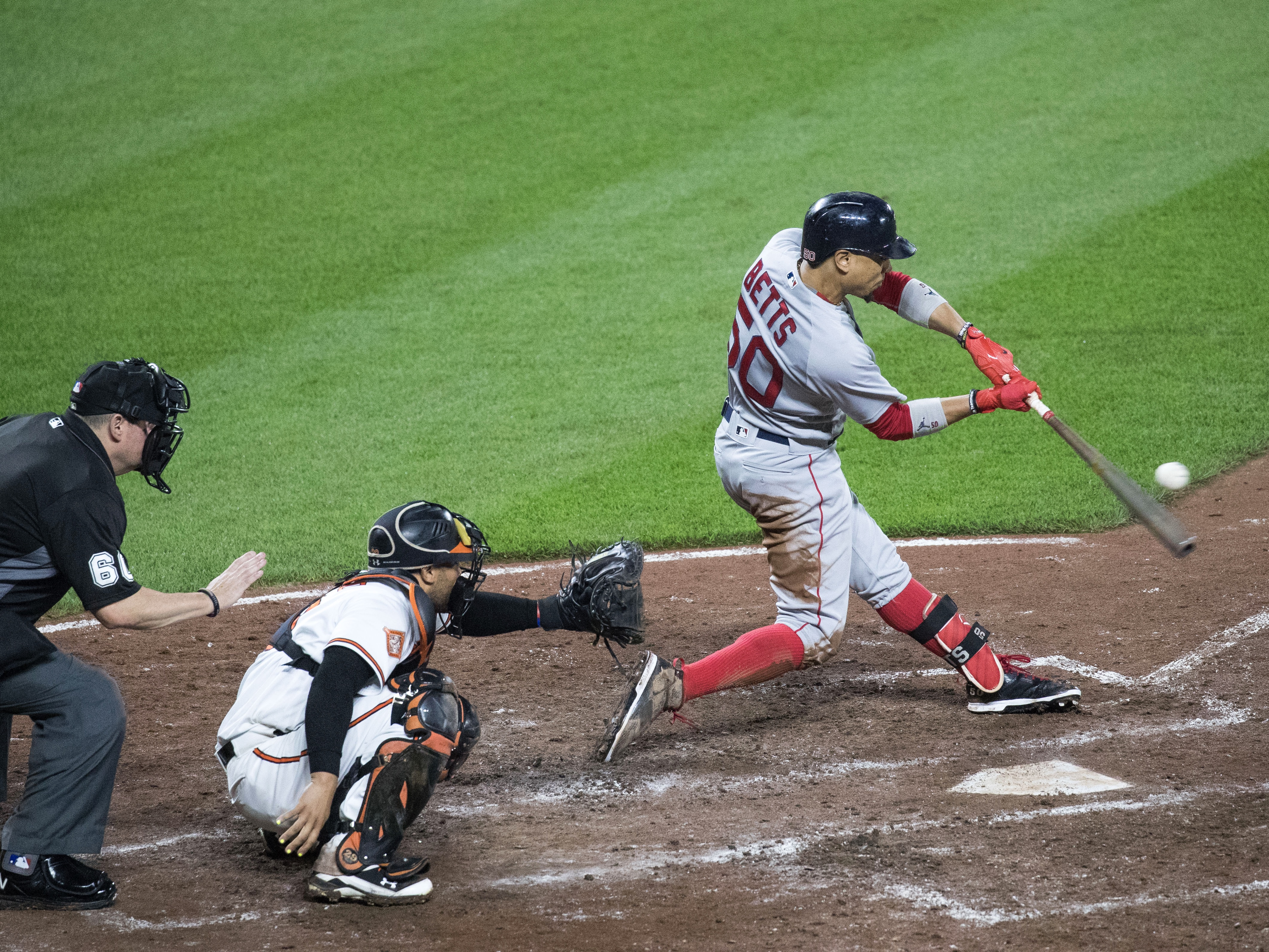
Mookie Betts' cycle was the first in MLB during the 2018 season.

=== Cycles ===
No.	Date	Red Sox batter	H/A	Hit order	Opponent	Ref.
1	August 9	Mookie Betts	Away	1B (1st), 3B (2nd), 2B (4th), HR (9th)	Toronto Blue Jays	
2	October 8†	Brock Holt	Away	1B (4th), 3B (4th), 2B (8th), HR (9th)	New York Yankees	

† Holt's cycle was the first in MLB postseason history.

=== Ejections ===
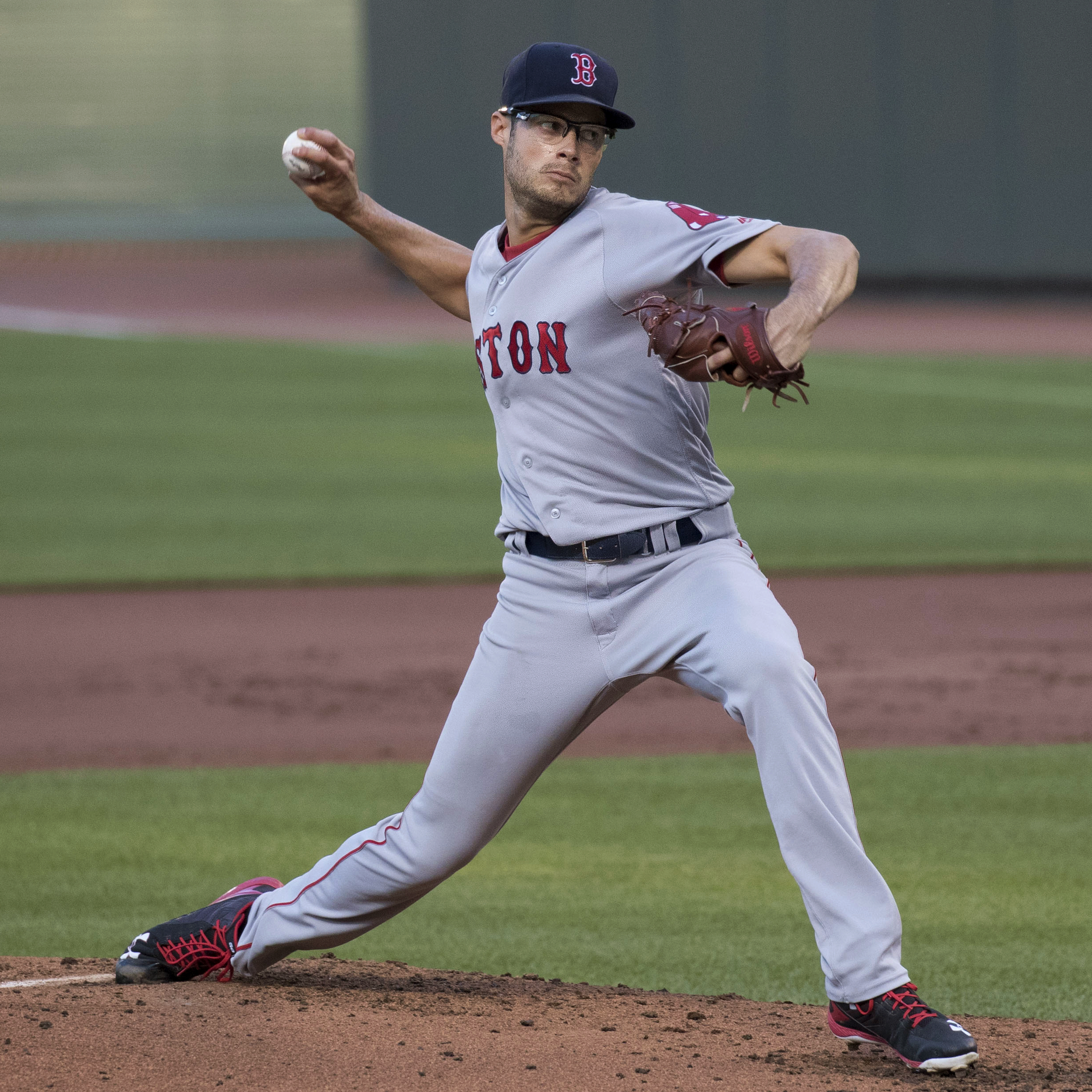
Joe Kelly was ejected on April 11 following a fight with Tyler Austin of the New York Yankees.

No.	Date	Red Sox personnel	H/A	Opponent
1	April 11	Joe Kelly	Home	New York Yankees
2	June 13	Chris Sale	Away	Baltimore Orioles
3	August 3	Alex Cora	Home	New York Yankees
4	August 31	Xander Bogaerts	Away	Chicago White Sox
5	August 31	Rick Porcello	Away	Chicago White Sox
6	October 13†	Alex Cora	Home	Houston Astros

† postseason game

=== Alumni game ===
The team held an alumni game on May 27, before a home game against the Atlanta Braves; it was the Red Sox' first such game since 1993. Dwight Evans and Luis Tiant acted as managers, assisted by bench coaches Joe Morgan and Jim Rice, respectively. The four-inning exhibition was won by Tiant's team, as Julio Lugo hit a two-run homer off of Pedro Martínez for the only runs in the game. Other Red Sox alumni participating included Wade Boggs, Oil Can Boyd, Mike Greenwell, Bill Lee, Derek Lowe, Mike Lowell, and Troy O'Leary.

=== Detailed records ===
American League
Opponent	Home	Away	Total	Pct.	Runs scored	Runs allowed
AL East
Baltimore Orioles	8–2	8–1	16–3	.842	127	66
Boston Red Sox	—	—	—	—	—	—
New York Yankees	7–3	3–6	10–9	.526	116	102
Tampa Bay Rays	6–3	5–5	11–8	.579	72	80
Toronto Blue Jays	9–1	6–3	15–4	.789	108	77
	30–9	22–15	52–24	.684	423	325
AL Central
Chicago White Sox	1–2	2–2	3–4	.429	22	28
Cleveland Indians	2–2	1–2	3–4	.429	38	29
Detroit Tigers	2–1	2–1	4–2	.667	25	14
Kansas City Royals	2–1	3–0	5–1	.833	53	30
Minnesota Twins	3–1	1–2	4–3	.571	30	21
	10–7	9–7	19–14	.576	168	122
AL West
Houston Astros	1–2	2–2	3–4	.429	31	34
Los Angeles Angels	3–0	3–0	6–0	1.000	49	12
Oakland Athletics	1–2	1–2	2–4	.333	22	25
Seattle Mariners	2–1	2–2	4–3	.571	38	29
Texas Rangers	3–0	3–1	6–1	.857	39	24
	10–5	11–7	21–12	.636	179	124

National League
Opponent	Home	Away	Total	Pct.	Runs scored	Runs allowed
Atlanta Braves	2–1	3–0	5–1	.833	37	26
Miami Marlins	2–0	2–0	4–0	1.000	33	18
New York Mets	2–1	—	2–1	.667	9	14
Washington Nationals	—	3–0	3–0	1.000	18	7
Philadelphia Phillies	1–1	1–1	2–2	.500	9	12
	7–3	9–1	16–4	.800	106	77

== Statistics ==
Please note only the statistics from playing with the Red Sox are included in this list.

=== Postseason batting ===
Player	G	AB	R	H	2B	3B	HR	RBI	SB	BB	AVG	Ref.
Andrew Benintendi	14	56	15	15	4	0	0	5	2	4	.268	
Mookie Betts	14	62	13	13	4	0	1	4	1	7	.210	
Xander Bogaerts	14	58	5	13	2	0	1	7	0	7	.224	
Jackie Bradley Jr.	14	40	6	8	2	0	3	10	1	9	.200	
Rafael Devers	11	34	7	10	0	0	1	9	1	3	.294	
Nathan Eovaldi	1	2	0	0	0	0	0	0	0	0	.000	
Brock Holt	8	27	7	7	2	1	1	6	1	4	.259	
Ian Kinsler	11	34	4	7	3	0	0	3	0	1	.206	
Sandy León	10	13	1	3	1	0	0	0	0	1	.231	
J. D. Martinez	14	50	6	15	2	0	3	14	0	10	.300	
Mitch Moreland	11	17	3	5	1	0	1	5	0	1	.294	
Eduardo Núñez	8	26	1	6	1	0	1	4	0	2	.231	
Steve Pearce	13	38	12	11	2	0	4	11	0	9	.289	
Rick Porcello	1	0	0	0	0	0	0	0	0	0	.000	
David Price	1	3	0	0	0	0	0	0	0	0	.000	
Eduardo Rodríguez	1	1	0	0	0	0	0	0	0	0	.000	
Blake Swihart	3	3	0	0	0	0	0	0	0	0	.000	
Christian Vázquez	12	37	4	8	1	0	1	2	0	1	.216	

=== Postseason pitching ===
Player	G	GS	W	L	SV	ERA	WHIP	IP	H	R	ER	BB	K	Ref.
Matt Barnes	10	0	2	0	0	1.04	1.04	8.2	3	1	1	6	9	
Ryan Brasier	9	0	0	0	0	1.04	1.38	8.2	7	1	1	5	7	
Nathan Eovaldi	6	2	2	1	0	1.61	0.81	22.1	15	5	4	3	16	
Heath Hembree	4	0	0	0	0	0.00	1.07	4.2	0	0	0	5	3	
Joe Kelly	9	0	2	1	0	0.79	0.71	11.1	8	2	1	0	13	
Craig Kimbrel	9	0	0	0	6	5.91	1.59	10.2	9	7	7	8	10	
Rick Porcello	5	3	1	0	0	3.52	1.11	15.1	15	6	6	2	11	
David Price	6	5	3	1	0	3.46	1.15	26.0	18	10	10	12	23	
Eduardo Rodríguez	7	1	0	0	0	6.30	1.10	10.0	6	7	7	5	11	
Chris Sale	5	3	1	0	0	4.11	1.24	15.1	11	7	7	8	24	
Brandon Workman	3	0	0	0	0	45.00	10.00	1.0	7	5	5	3	3	

=== Regular season batting ===
Note: G = Games played; AB = At bats; R = Runs scored; H = Hits; 2B = Doubles; 3B = Triples; HR = Home runs; RBI = Runs batted in; SB = Stolen bases; BB = Walks; AVG = Batting average; Ref. = Reference

Top ten batters shown. Qualified batters in bold.

Player	G	AB	R	H	2B	3B	HR	RBI	SB	BB	AVG	Ref.
**Andrew Benintendi**	148	579	103	168	41	6	16	87	21	71	.290	
**Mookie Betts**	136	520	129	180	47	5	32	80	30	81	.346	
**Xander Bogaerts**	136	513	72	148	45	3	23	103	8	55	.288	
**Jackie Bradley Jr.**	144	474	76	111	33	4	13	59	17	46	.234	
Rafael Devers	121	450	59	108	24	0	21	66	5	38	.240	
Brock Holt	109	321	41	89	18	2	7	46	7	37	.277	
**J. D. Martinez**	150	569	111	188	37	2	43	130	6	69	.330	
Mitch Moreland	124	404	57	99	23	4	15	68	2	50	.245	
Steve Pearce	50	136	19	38	8	1	7	26	0	22	.279	
Rick Porcello	3	7	1	3	2	0	0	3	0	0	.429	

Rest of the position players
Player	G	AB	R	H	2B	3B	HR	RBI	SB	BB	AVG	Ref.
Dan Butler	2	6	0	1	0	0	0	1	0	0	.167	
Nathan Eovaldi	2	2	1	0	0	0	0	0	0	1	.000	
Heath Hembree	2	1	0	0	0	0	0	0	0	0	.000	
Brian Johnson	2	4	1	1	0	0	0	0	0	0	.250	
Ian Kinsler	37	132	17	32	6	0	1	16	7	10	.242	
Sandy León	89	265	30	47	12	0	5	22	1	15	.177	
Tzu-Wei Lin	37	65	15	16	6	1	1	6	0	8	.246	
Eduardo Núñez	127	480	56	127	23	3	10	44	7	16	.265	
Dustin Pedroia	3	11	1	1	0	0	0	0	0	2	.091	
Brandon Phillips	9	23	4	3	0	0	1	2	0	4	.130	
Hanley Ramírez	44	177	25	45	7	0	6	29	4	14	.254	
Tony Renda	1	0	1	0	0	0	0	0	0	0	.000	
Eduardo Rodríguez	1	2	0	0	0	0	0	0	0	0	.000	
Chris Sale	1	2	0	0	0	0	0	0	0	0	.000	
Blake Swihart	82	192	28	44	10	0	3	18	6	15	.229	
Sam Travis	19	36	5	8	3	0	1	7	0	2	.222	
Christian Vázquez	79	251	24	52	10	0	3	16	4	13	.207	
Héctor Velázquez	1	1	0	0	0	0	0	0	0	0	.000	
**Team totals**	**162**	**5623**	**876**	**1509**	**355**	**31**	**208**	**829**	**125**	**569**	**.268**	

Top 10 hitters determined by fWAR:

=== Regular season pitching ===
Note: G = Games pitched; GS = Games started; W = Wins; L = Losses; SV = Saves; ERA = Earned run average; WHIP = Walks plus hits per inning pitched; IP = Innings pitched; H = Hits allowed; R = Total runs allowed; ER = Earned runs allowed; BB = Walks allowed; K = Strikeouts; Ref. = Reference

Top ten pitchers shown. Qualified pitchers in bold.

Player	G	GS	W	L	SV	ERA	WHIP	IP	H	R	ER	BB	K	Ref.
Matt Barnes	62	0	6	4	0	3.65	1.26	61.2	47	25	25	31	96	
Ryan Brasier	34	0	2	0	0	1.60	0.77	33.2	19	6	6	7	29	
Nathan Eovaldi	12	11	3	3	0	3.33	1.28	54.0	57	28	20	12	48	
Joe Kelly	73	0	4	2	2	4.39	1.36	65.2	57	34	32	32	68	
Craig Kimbrel	63	0	5	1	42	2.74	0.99	62.1	31	19	19	31	96	
**Rick Porcello**	33	33	17	7	0	4.28	1.18	191.1	177	97	91	48	190	
**David Price**	30	30	16	7	0	3.58	1.14	176.0	151	75	70	50	177	
Eduardo Rodríguez	27	23	13	5	0	3.82	1.26	129.2	119	56	55	45	146	
Chris Sale	27	27	12	4	0	2.11	0.86	158.0	102	39	37	34	237	
Héctor Velázquez	47	8	7	2	0	3.18	1.45	85.0	97	35	30	26	53	

Rest of the pitching staff
Player	G	GS	W	L	SV	ERA	WHIP	IP	H	R	ER	BB	K	Ref.
Jalen Beeks	2	1	0	1	0	12.79	2.37	6.1	11	9	9	4	5	
William Cuevas	9	1	0	2	0	7.41	1.82	17.0	20	14	14	11	20	
Justin Haley	4	0	0	0	0	4.70	1.70	7.2	10	4	4	3	0	
Heath Hembree	67	0	4	1	0	4.20	1.33	60.0	53	30	28	27	76	
Brian Johnson	38	13	4	5	0	4.17	1.43	99.1	104	49	46	38	87	
Drew Pomeranz	26	11	2	6	0	6.20	1.78	74.0	88	53	51	44	66	
Bobby Poyner	20	0	1	0	0	3.22	1.12	22.1	22	8	8	3	24	
Robby Scott	9	0	0	1	0	8.10	2.25	6.2	10	6	6	5	8	
Carson Smith	18	0	1	1	0	3.77	1.40	14.1	14	6	6	6	18	
Tyler Thornburg	25	0	2	0	0	5.63	1.58	24.0	28	15	15	10	21	
Marcus Walden	8	0	0	0	1	3.68	1.16	14.2	14	7	6	3	14	
Brandon Workman	43	0	6	1	0	3.27	1.21	41.1	34	15	15	16	37	
Steven Wright	20	4	3	1	1	2.68	1.25	53.2	41	17	16	26	42	
**Team totals**	**162**	**162**	**108**	**54**	**46**	**3.75**	**1.25**	**1458.2**	**1305**	**647**	**608**	**512**	**1558**	

Top 10 pitchers determined by fWAR:

== Awards and honors ==
Recipient	Award	Date awarded	Ref.
J. D. Martinez	AL Player of the Week (May 14–20)	May 21, 2018	
Chris Sale	AL Pitcher of the Month (June)	July 2, 2018	
Mookie Betts	All-Star Starting OF	July 8, 2018	
J. D. Martinez	All-Star Starting DH	July 8, 2018	
Chris Sale	All-Star Starting P	July 8, 2018	
Mitch Moreland	All-Star Reserve 1B	July 8, 2018	
Craig Kimbrel	All-Star Reserve P	July 8, 2018	
Xander Bogaerts	AL Player of the Week (July 2–8)	July 9, 2018	
Chris Sale	AL Pitcher of the Month (July)	August 2, 2018	
J. D. Martinez	AL Player of the Week (August 6–12)	August 13, 2018	
J. D. Martinez	AL Player of the Month (August)	September 4, 2018	
Mookie Betts	30–30 club	September 26, 2018	
Mookie Betts	AL batting champion	September 30, 2018	
J. D. Martinez	AL RBI crown	September 30, 2018	
Jackie Bradley Jr.	AL Championship Series MVP	October 18, 2018	
J. D. Martinez	AL Hank Aaron Award	October 26, 2018	
Steve Pearce	World Series MVP	October 28, 2018	
David Price	Babe Ruth Award	November 2, 2018	
Mookie Betts	AL Gold Glove RF	November 4, 2018	
Jackie Bradley Jr.	AL Gold Glove CF	November 4, 2018	
Ian Kinsler	AL Gold Glove 2B	November 4, 2018	
Mookie Betts	Defensive Player of the Year RF	November 7, 2018	
Mookie Betts	Heart & Hustle Award	November 8, 2018	
Mookie Betts	Silver Slugger Award OF	November 8, 2018	
J. D. Martinez	Silver Slugger Award OF	November 8, 2018	
J. D. Martinez	Silver Slugger Award DH	November 8, 2018	
Mookie Betts	AL MVP	November 15, 2018	
David Price	AL Comeback Player of the Year	November 20, 2018	
Dave Dombrowski	Baseball America Executive of the Year	November 26, 2018	
J. D. Martinez	Players Choice Awards, Player of the Year	November 27, 2018	
Mookie Betts	Players Choice Awards, AL Outstanding Player	November 27, 2018	

- Alex Cora finished second to Bob Melvin of the Oakland Athletics for the AL Manager of the Year Award.

== Farm system ==
Level	Team	League	Manager
AAA	Pawtucket Red Sox	International League	Kevin Boles
AA	Portland Sea Dogs	Eastern League	Darren Fenster
A-Advanced	Salem Red Sox	Carolina League	Joe Oliver
A	Greenville Drive	South Atlantic League	Iggy Suarez
A-Short Season	Lowell Spinners	New York–Penn League	Corey Wimberly
Rookie	GCL Red Sox	Gulf Coast League	Tom Kotchman
Rookie	DSL Red Sox 1	Dominican Summer League	Aly González
Rookie	DSL Red Sox 2	Dominican Summer League	Fernando Tatís

== Allegations of electronic sign stealing ==
On January 7, 2020, The Athletic published a report alleging that the Red Sox broke MLB rules by using a video replay room during 2018 regular season games to decipher the signs of opposing catchers, according to three unnamed sources who were with the team that year. This news broke while the league was already investigating the Houston Astros for also allegedly stealing signs electronically during their 2017 season. Alex Cora, who managed the Red Sox in 2018, had served as bench coach for the Astros in 2017. MLB launched an investigation.

This was not the first time the Red Sox were investigated for alleged electronic sign stealing. During the 2017 season, they were fined by MLB for using an Apple Watch to relay stolen signs to hitters in games against the New York Yankees. On September 15, 2017, commissioner Rob Manfred had said in regards to the investigation into Boston's illicit use of an Apple Watch: "I have received absolute assurances from the Red Sox that there will be no future violations of this type."

On April 22, 2020, commissioner Manfred issued his report from the investigation, determining that the Red Sox replay operator had "utilized the game feeds in the replay room" to decode sign sequences but those actions were "limited in scope and impact", as the decoding only happened during some occurrences of the opposing team having a runner on second base and were not known to "then-Manager Alex Cora, the Red Sox coaching staff, the Red Sox front office, or most of the players". The video replay operator was suspended for the 2020 season and the team forfeited their second-round selection in the 2020 MLB draft. Cora was separately suspended for a year for his actions in the Houston situation.

== See also ==
- List of Boston Red Sox team records
