= 2018 Baltimore Orioles season =

Major League Baseball season

2018 Baltimore Orioles
- League: American League
- Division: East
- Ballpark: Oriole Park at Camden Yards
- City: Baltimore, Maryland
- Record: 47–115 (.290)
- Divisional place: 5th
- Owners: Peter Angelos
- General managers: Dan Duquette
- Managers: Buck Showalter
- Television: MASN (Gary Thorne, Jim Palmer, Mike Bordick, Jim Hunter)
- Radio: WJZ-FM; Baltimore Orioles Radio Network (Joe Angel, Jim Hunter, Ben McDonald, Mike Bordick)

The 2018 Baltimore Orioles season was the team's 118th season overall, 65th in Baltimore, and 27th at Oriole Park at Camden Yards. They attempted to rebound from their first losing season since 2011 when they went 75–87. However, the Orioles instead suffered one of the worst seasons in MLB history, going 47–115 and missing the playoffs for the second straight season. The Orioles set several statistical records and quirks, such as being 60 or more games behind the division (later World Series) champions Boston Red Sox, the most games behind a division champion since the 1935 Boston Braves, who themselves lost 115 games. They became the first team since the 2003 Detroit Tigers, who suffered a similar fate when they went 43–119, to have fewer than 50 wins in a full 162-game season. The Orioles held a losing record against all American League teams, ensured by their loss to the Houston Astros on September 28. First baseman Chris Davis posted a .168 batting average and a -3.3 WAR in his third year of a 7-year, $161 million contract, the worst among qualified players in MLB history.

The 2018 Orioles also held the MLB record of earliest playoff exit since the divisional era came to play in 1969, being eliminated from postseason contention on August 20, a record that would not be surpassed until 2024, when the Chicago White Sox were eliminated from postseason contention on August 17, 2024. The White Sox elimination occurred despite the MLB adding an extra wild card spot to its playoff field.

To further add to the team's abysmal season, many of their key contributors including Manny Machado, Zack Britton, Jonathan Schoop, Darren O'Day, Kevin Gausman, and Brad Brach all left the team via trades in the trade deadline.

Manager Buck Showalter's and general manager Dan Duquette's contracts expired and were not renewed after the season, ending their respective tenures with Baltimore.

== Regular season ==
=== Season standings ===
==== American League East ====
AL East
Team	W	L	Pct.	GB	Home	Road
Boston Red Sox	108	54	.667	—	57‍–‍24	51‍–‍30
New York Yankees	100	62	.617	8	53‍–‍28	47‍–‍34
Tampa Bay Rays	90	72	.556	18	51‍–‍30	39‍–‍42
Toronto Blue Jays	73	89	.451	35	40‍–‍41	33‍–‍48
Baltimore Orioles	47	115	.290	61	28‍–‍53	19‍–‍62

==== American League Wild Card ====
Division leaders
Team	W	L	Pct.
Boston Red Sox	108	54	.667
Houston Astros	103	59	.636
Cleveland Indians	91	71	.562

Wild Card teams (Top 2 teams qualify for postseason)
Team	W	L	Pct.	GB
New York Yankees	100	62	.617	+3
Oakland Athletics	97	65	.599	—
Tampa Bay Rays	90	72	.556	7
Seattle Mariners	89	73	.549	8
Los Angeles Angels	80	82	.494	17
Minnesota Twins	78	84	.481	19
Toronto Blue Jays	73	89	.451	24
Texas Rangers	67	95	.414	30
Detroit Tigers	64	98	.395	33
Chicago White Sox	62	100	.383	35
Kansas City Royals	58	104	.358	39
Baltimore Orioles	47	115	.290	50

==== Record against opponents ====
2018 American League record Source: MLB Standings Grid – 2018
Team	BAL	BOS	CWS	CLE	DET	HOU	KC	LAA	MIN	NYY	OAK	SEA	TB	TEX	TOR	NL
Baltimore	—	3–16	3–4	2–5	2–4	1–6	2–4	1–5	1–6	7–12	1–5	1–6	8–11	3–4	5–14	7–13
Boston	16–3	—	3–4	3–4	4–2	3–4	5–1	6–0	4–3	10–9	2–4	4–3	11–8	6–1	15–4	16–4
Chicago	4–3	4–3	—	5–14	7–12	0–7	11–8	2–5	7–12	2–4	2–5	2–4	4–2	4–3	2–4	6–14
Cleveland	5–2	4–3	14–5	—	13–6	3–4	12–7	3–3	10–9	2–5	2–4	2–5	2–4	4–2	3–4	12–8
Detroit	4–2	2–4	12–7	6–13	—	1–5	8–11	3–4	7–12	3–4	0–7	3–4	2–4	3–4	4–3	6–14
Houston	6–1	4–3	7–0	4–3	5–1	—	5–1	13–6	4–2	2–5	12–7	9–10	3–4	12–7	4–2	13–7
Kansas City	4–2	1–5	8–11	7–12	11–8	1–5	—	1–6	10–9	2–5	2–5	1–5	0–7	2–5	2–5	6–14
Los Angeles	5–1	0–6	5–2	3–3	4–3	6–13	6–1	—	4–3	1–5	10–9	8–11	1–6	13–6	4–3	10–10
Minnesota	6–1	3–4	12–7	9–10	12–7	2–4	9–10	3–4	—	2–5	2–5	1–5	3–4	2–4	4–2	8–12
New York	12–7	9–10	4–2	5–2	4–3	5–2	5–2	5–1	5–2	—	3–3	5–1	10–9	4–3	13–6	11–9
Oakland	5–1	4–2	5–2	4–2	7–0	7–12	5–2	9–10	5–2	3–3	—	9–10	2–5	13–6	7–0	12–8
Seattle	6–1	3–4	4–2	5–2	4–3	10–9	5–1	11–8	5–1	1–5	10–9	—	6–1	10–9	3–4	6–14
Tampa Bay	11–8	8–11	2–4	4–2	4–2	4–3	7–0	6–1	4–3	9–10	5–2	1–6	—	5–1	13–6	7–13
Texas	4–3	1–6	3–4	2–4	4–3	7–12	5–2	6–13	4–2	3–4	6–13	9–10	1–5	—	3–3	9–11
Toronto	14–5	4–15	4–2	4–3	3–4	2–4	5–2	3–4	2–4	6–13	0–7	4–3	6–13	3–3	—	13–7

==== Detailed records ====
American League
Opponent	Home	Away	Total	Pct.
AL East
Baltimore Orioles	-	-	-	
Boston Red Sox	1–8	2–8	3–16	.158
New York Yankees	2–8	5–4	7–12	.368
Toronto Blue Jays	5–4	0–10	5–14	.263
Tampa Bay Rays	6–4	2–7	8–11	.421
	14–24	9–29	23–53	.303
AL Central
Detroit Tigers	2–1	0–3	2–4	.333
Cleveland Indians	1–3	1–2	2–5	.286
Kansas City Royals	2–1	0–3	2–4	.333
Minnesota Twins	1–2	0–4	1–6	.143
Chicago White Sox	1–2	2–2	3–4	.429
	7–9	3–14	10–23	.303
AL West
Oakland Athletics	1–2	0–3	1–5	.167
Houston Astros	1–3	0–3	1–6	.143
Los Angeles Angels	1–2	0–3	1–5	.167
Seattle Mariners	0–4	1–2	1–6	.143
Texas Rangers	2–1	1–3	3–4	.429
	5–12	2–14	7–26	.212

National League
Opponent	Home	Away	Total	Pct.
Washington Nationals	0–3	1–2	1–5	.167
New York Mets	1–1	2–0	3–1	.750
Atlanta Braves	-	2–1	2–1	.667
Philadelphia Phillies	0–2	0–2	0–4	.000
Miami Marlins	1–2	-	1–2	.333
	2–7	5–6	7–13	.350

== Game log ==
Past games legend
Orioles win (#bfb)	Orioles loss (#fbb)	Game postponed (#bbb)	Eliminated from playoff contention (#933)
Bold denotes an Orioles pitcher

Baltimore Orioles 2018 Season Game Log — Season Record: 47–115 (.290)
March/April: 8–20 (Home: 5–10; Away: 3–10)

#	Date	Opponent	Score	Win	Loss	Save	Attendance	Record	Box/ Streak
1	March 29	Twins	3–2 (11)	**Bleier** (1–0)	Rodney (0–1)	—	45,469	1–0	W1
2	March 31	Twins	2–6	Gibson (1–0)	**Cashner** (0–1)	—	17,763	1–1	L1
3	April 1	Twins	0–7	Berríos (1–0)	**Gausman** (0–1)	—	17,212	1–2	L2
4	April 2	@ Astros	1–6	Morton (1–0)	**Tillman** (0–1)	—	42,675	1–3	L3
5	April 3	@ Astros	6–10	Rondón (1–0)	**Araújo** (0–1)	—	40,081	1–4	L4
6	April 4	@ Astros	2–3	Peacock (1–0)	**Castro** (0–1)	—	27,698	1–5	L5
7	April 5	@ Yankees	5–2	**Cashner** (1–1)	Tanaka (1–1)	**Brach** (1)	33,653	2–5	W1
8	April 6	@ Yankees	7–3 (14)	**Araújo** (1–1)	Holder (1–1)	—	34,244	3–5	W2
9	April 7	@ Yankees	3–8	Gray (1–0)	**Tillman** (0–2)	—	34,388	3–6	L1
10	April 8	@ Yankees	8–7 (12)	**Bleier** (2–0)	Warren (0–1)	**Brach** (2)	37,096	4–6	W1
11	April 9	Blue Jays	1–7	Happ (2–1)	**Bundy** (0–1)	—	7,915	4–7	L1
12	April 10	Blue Jays	1–2	Sanchez (1–1)	**O'Day** (0–1)	Osuna (5)	8,640	4–8	L2
13	April 11	Blue Jays	5–3	**Gausman** (1–1)	Estrada (1–1)	**Brach** (3)	10,399	5–8	W1
14	April 13	@ Red Sox	3–7	Rodríguez (1–0)	**Tillman** (0–3)	—	32,610	5–9	L1
15	April 14	@ Red Sox	3–10	Velázquez (2–0)	**Cobb** (0–1)	Walden (1)	33,584	5–10	L2
16	April 15	@ Red Sox	1–3	Hembree (2–0)	**Bundy** (0–2)	Kimbrel (5)	32,489	5–11	L3
—	April 16	@ Red Sox	Postponed (rain). Makeup date May 17.						
17	April 17	@ Tigers	2–4	Liriano (2–1)	**Cashner** (1–2)	Greene (3)	15,530	5–12	L4
18	April 18	@ Tigers	5–6	Greene (1–0)	**Araújo** (1–2)	—	15,178	5–13	L5
19	April 19	@ Tigers	8–13	Zimmermann (1–0)	**Cobb** (0–2)	—	15,916	5–14	L6
20	April 20	Indians	3–1	**Bundy** (1–2)	Bauer (1–2)	**O'Day** (1)	20,004	6–14	W1
21	April 21	Indians	0–4	Clevinger (2–0)	**Tillman** (0–4)	—	29,187	6–15	L1
22	April 22	Indians	3–7	Kluber (3–1)	**Cashner** (1–3)	—	27,394	6–16	L2
23	April 23	Indians	1–2	Carrasco (4–0)	**Gausman** (1–2)	Allen (4)	10,614	6–17	L3
—	April 24	Rays	Postponed (rain). Makeup date May 12 as part of doubleheader.						
24	April 25	Rays	4–8	Kittredge (1–2)	**Cobb** (0–3)	—	8,730	6–18	L4
25	April 26	Rays	5–9	Archer (2–1)	**Bundy** (1–3)	—	9,586	6–19	L5
26	April 27	Tigers	6–0	**Tillman** (1–4)	Fiers (2–2)	—	14,223	7–19	W1
27	April 28	Tigers	5–9	Liriano (3–1)	**Cashner** (1–4)	—	20,896	7–20	L1
28	April 29	Tigers	5–3	**Gausman** (2–2)	Norris (0–2)	**O'Day** (2)	28,089	8–20	W1

May: 9–19 (Home: 5–6; Away: 4–13)

#	Date	Opponent	Score	Win	Loss	Save	Attendance	Record	Box/ Streak
29	May 1	@ Angels	2–3	Bedrosian (1–0)	**Brach** (0–1)	—	32,345	8–21	L1
30	May 2	@ Angels	7–10	Heaney (1–1)	**Bundy** (1–4)	—	32,156	8–22	L2
31	May 3	@ Angels	3–12	Barría (2–1)	**Tillman** (1–5)	—	35,879	8–23	L3
32	May 4	@ Athletics	4–6	Trivino (2–0)	**Brach** (0–2)	Treinen (4)	12,723	8–24	L4
33	May 5	@ Athletics	0–2 (12)	Hatcher (3–0)	**Araújo** (1–3)	—	24,612	8–25	L5
34	May 6	@ Athletics	1–2	Triggs (3–1)	**Cobb** (0–4)	Treinen (5)	17,112	8–26	L6
35	May 8	Royals	7–15	Duffy (1–4)	**Bundy** (1–5)	—	10,863	8–27	L7
36	May 9	Royals	5–3	**Bleier** (3–0)	McCarthy (3–1)	**Brach** (4)	14,375	9–27	W1
37	May 10	Royals	11–6	**Castro** (1–1)	Kennedy (1–4)	—	17,842	10–27	W2
38	May 11	Rays	9–4	**Gausman** (3–2)	Faria (3–2)	**Brach** (5)	28,170	11–27	W3
39	May 12	Rays	6–3	**Hess** (1–0)	Archer (2–3)	**Givens** (1)	24,534 (Note: Single-admission doubleheader)	12–27	W4
40	May 12	Rays	3–10	Romo (1–0)	**Cobb** (0–5)	—	24,534	12–28	L1
41	May 13	Rays	17–1	**Bundy** (2–5)	Snell (4–3)	—	25,257	13–28	W1
—	May 15	Phillies	Postponed (rain). Makeup date July 12.						
42	May 16	Phillies	1–4	Pivetta (3–2)	**Cashner** (1–5)	—	29,706	13–29	L1
43	May 17	@ Red Sox	2–6	Price (4–4)	**Gausman** (3–3)	—	36,615	13–30	L2
44	May 18	@ Red Sox	7–4	**Cobb** (1–5)	Pomeranz (1–2)	**Brach** (6)	34,935	14–30	W1
45	May 19	@ Red Sox	3–6	Porcello (6–1)	**Bundy** (2–6)	Kimbrel (13)	34,195	14–31	L1
46	May 20	@ Red Sox	0–5	Rodríguez (4–1)	**Hess** (1–1)	—	35,550	14–32	L2
47	May 21	@ White Sox	3–2	**Cashner** (2–5)	Santiago (0–2)	**Brach** (7)	11,628	15–32	W1
48	May 22	@ White Sox	2–3	Rondón (2–2)	**Givens** (0–1)	Jones (4)	12,590	15–33	L1
49	May 23	@ White Sox	1–11	Covey (1–1)	**Cobb** (1–6)	—	17,056	15–34	L2
50	May 24	@ White Sox	9–3	**Bundy** (3–6)	Giolito (3–5)	—	19,147	16–34	W1
51	May 25	@ Rays	2–0	**Hess** (2–1)	Romo (1–1)	**Brach** (8)	11,354	17–34	W2
52	May 26	@ Rays	1–5	Banda (1–0)	**Cashner** (2–6)	—	14,744	17–35	L1
53	May 27	@ Rays	3–8	Nuño (1–0)	**Gausman** (3–4)	Pruitt (1)	13,311	17–36	L2
54	May 28	Nationals	0–6	González (6–2)	**Cobb** (1–7)	—	36,139	17–37	L3
55	May 29	Nationals	2–3	Hellickson (2–0)	**Bundy** (3–7)	Doolittle (12)	13,935	17–38	L4
56	May 30	Nationals	0–2	Scherzer (9–1)	**Hess** (2–2)	Doolittle (13)	20,370	17–39	L5
—	May 31	Yankees	Postponed (rain). Makeup date July 9 as part of doubleheader.						

June: 6–20 (Home: 1–13; Away: 5–6)

#	Date	Opponent	Score	Win	Loss	Save	Attendance	Record	Box/ Streak
57	June 1	Yankees	1–4	Gray (4–4)	**Cashner** (2–6)	Chapman (13)	26,500	17–40	L6
58	June 2	Yankees	5–8	Tanaka (7–2)	**Gausman** (3–5)		32,823	17–41	L7
—	June 3	Yankees	Postponed (rain). Makeup date August 25 as part of doubleheader.						
59	June 5	@ Mets	2–1	**Cobb** (2–7)	Vargas (2–4)	**Brach** (9)	25,342	18–41	W1
60	June 6	@ Mets	1–0	**Bundy** (4–7)	Familia (2–3)	**Brach** (10)	30,366	19–41	W2
61	June 7	@ Blue Jays	4–5 (10)	Barnes (2–1)	**Castro** (1–2)	—	24,494	19–42	L1
62	June 8	@ Blue Jays	1–5	Happ (8–3)	**Cashner** (2–8)	Tepera (3)	28,863	19–43	L2
63	June 9	@ Blue Jays	3–4 (10)	Axford (1–0)	**Givens** (0–2)	—	34,643	19–44	L3
64	June 10	@ Blue Jays	3–13	Estrada (3–6)	**Cobb** (2–8)	—	33,485	19–45	L4
65	June 11	Red Sox	0–2 (12)	Hembree (3–1)	**Givens** (0–3)	Kimbrel (21)	15,934	19–46	L5
66	June 12	Red Sox	4–6	Rodríguez (8–1)	**Hess** (2–3)	—	21,837	19–47	L6
67	June 13	Red Sox	1–5	Sale (6–4)	**Ramírez** (0–1)	—	17,217	19–48	L7
68	June 15	Marlins	0–2	Ureña (2–8)	**Gausman** (3–6)	Barraclough (5)	23,968	19–49	L8
69	June 16	Marlins	4–5	Chen (2–8)	**Cobb** (2–9)	Steckenrider (1)	23,948	19–50	L9
70	June 17	Marlins	10–4	**Bundy** (5–7)	Richards (1–4)	—	21,421	20–50	W1
71	June 19	@ Nationals	7–9	Miller (5–0)	**Scott** (0–1)	Doolittle (19)	33,391	20–51	L1
72	June 20	@ Nationals	3–0	**Castro** (2–2)	González (6–4)	—	32,153	21–51	W1
73	June 21	@ Nationals	2–4	Herrera (2–1)	**Givens** (0–4)	Doolittle (20)	36,868	21–52	L1
74	June 22	@ Braves	10–7 (15)	**Wright** (1–0)	Moylan (0–1)	—	37,192	22–52	W1
75	June 23	@ Braves	7–5	**Bundy** (6–7)	Teherán (5–5)	**Britton** (1)	40,333	23–52	W2
76	June 24	@ Braves	3–7	McCarthy (6–3)	**Hess** (2–4)	—	33,794	23–53	L1
77	June 25	Mariners	3–5	Hernández (7–6)	**Castro** (2–3)	Díaz (28)	21,202	23–54	L2
78	June 26	Mariners	2–3	Paxton (7–2)	**O'Day** (0–2)	Díaz (29)	16,327	23–55	L3
79	June 27	Mariners	7–8 (11)	Bradford (5–0)	**Givens** (0–5)	Díaz (30)	15,502	23–56	L4
80	June 28	Mariners	2–4 (10)	Pazos (2–1)	**Castro** (2–4)	Nicasio (1)	14,263	23–57	L5
81	June 29	Angels	1–7	Peña (1–0)	**Hess** (2–5)	—	24,007	23–58	L6
82	June 30	Angels	2–6	Anderson (2–2)	**Givens** (0–6)	—	38,838	23–59	L7

July: 9–15 (Home: 9–5; Away: 0–10)

#	Date	Opponent	Score	Win	Loss	Save	Attendance	Record	Box/ Streak
83	July 1	Angels	8–2	**Gausman** (4–6)	McGuire (0–1)	—	18,351	24–59	W1
84	July 3	@ Phillies	2–3	Eflin (7–2)	**Cobb** (2–10)	Domínguez (8)	28,204	24–60	L1
85	July 4	@ Phillies	1–4	Nola (11–2)	**Ramírez** (0–2)	Arano (1)	30,943	24–61	L2
86	July 5	@ Twins	2–5	Slegers (1–0)	**Cashner** (2–9)	Rodney (18)	22,895	24–62	L3
87	July 6	@ Twins	2–6	Lynn (6–7)	**Bundy** (6–8)	—	27,570	24–63	L4
88	July 7	@ Twins	4–5	Gibson (3–6)	**Castro** (2–5)	Rodney (19)	25,974	24–64	L5
89	July 8	@ Twins	1–10	Odorizzi (4–6)	**Cobb** (2–11)	—	22,557	24–65	L6
90	July 9	Yankees	5–4	**Wright** (2–0)	Sabathia (6–4)	**Britton** (2)	26,340 (Note: Single-admission doubleheader)	25–65	W1
91	July 9	Yankees	2–10	Cessa (1–1)	**Ramírez** (0–3)	Gallegos (1)	26,340	25–66	L1
92	July 10	Yankees	6–5	**Britton** (1–0)	Betances (1–3)	—	18,418	26–66	W1
93	July 11	Yankees	0–9	Gray (6–7)	**Bundy** (6–9)	—	17,808	26–67	L1
94	July 12	Phillies	4–5	Pivetta (6–7)	**Gausman** (4–7)	Domínguez (9)	20,100	26–68	L2
95	July 13	Rangers	4–5	Hamels (5–8)	**Cobb** (2–12)	Kela (23)	17,348	26–69	L3
96	July 14	Rangers	1–0	**Brach** (1–2)	Pérez (2–4)	**Britton** (3)	38,238	27–69	W1
97	July 15	Rangers	6–5	**Scott** (1–1)	Minor (6–6)	**Britton** (4)	18,754	28–69	W2
ASG	July 17	@ Nationals Park	AL 8–6 (10) NL	Díaz	Stripling	Happ	43,843	—	Box
98	July 20	@ Blue Jays	7–8 (10)	Axford (3–1)	**Fry** (0–1)	—	31,115	28–70	L1
99	July 21	@ Blue Jays	1–4	Stroman (3–7)	**Cobb** (2–13)	Tepera (7)	35,912	28–71	L2
100	July 22	@ Blue Jays	4–5	Axford (4–1)	**Scott** (1–2)	Clippard (7)	39,021	28–72	L3
101	July 23	Red Sox	3–5	Porcello (12–4)	**Gausman** (4–8)	Kimbrel (32)	16,885	28–73	L4
102	July 24	Red Sox	7–6	**Ramírez** (1–3)	Porcello (1–4)	**Brach** (11)	13,342	29–73	W1
—	July 25	Red Sox	Postponed (rain). Makeup date August 11 as part of doubleheader.						
103	July 26	Rays	3–4	Yarbrough (9–5)	**Cobb** (2–14)	Pruitt (2)	19,025	29–74	L1
104	July 27	Rays	15–5	**Cashner** (3–9)	Archer (3–5)	—	15,649	30–74	W1
105	July 28	Rays	11–2	**Gausman** (5–8)	Stanek (1–3)	—	21,526	31–74	W2
106	July 29	Rays	11–5	**Bundy** (7–9)	Chirinos (0–3)	—	22,454	32–74	W3
107	July 31	@ Yankees	3–6	Tanaka (9–2)	**Ramírez** (1–4)	—	46,473	32–75	L1

August: 8–20 (Home: 4–9; Away: 4–11)

#	Date	Opponent	Score	Win	Loss	Save	Attendance	Record	Box/ Streak
108	August 1	@ Yankees	7–5	**Cobb** (3–14)	Gray (8–8)	—	47,206	33–75	W1
109	August 2	@ Rangers	8–17	Gallardo (6–1)	**Cashner** (3–10)	Butler (1)	19,367	33–76	L1
110	August 3	@ Rangers	3–11	Jurado (2–1)	**Hess** (2–6)	—	22,544	33–77	L2
111	August 4	@ Rangers	1–3	Minor (8–6)	**Bundy** (7–10)	Leclerc (1)	24,300	33–78	L3
112	August 5	@ Rangers	9–6	**Scott** (2–2)	Hutchison (1–2)	**Givens** (2)	19,961	34–78	W1
113	August 7	@ Rays	3–4	Romo (2–2)	**Castro** (2–6)	—	11,734	34–79	L1
114	August 8	@ Rays	5–4	**Wright** (3–0)	Romo (2–3)	**Givens** (3)	9,474	35–79	W1
115	August 9	@ Rays	4–5	Chirinos (1–4)	**Carroll** (0–1)	Romo (14)	10,254	35–80	L1
116	August 10	Red Sox	12–19	Pomeranz (2–5)	**Castro** (2–7)	—	23,649	35–81	L2
117	August 11	Red Sox	0–5	Price (12–6)	**Yacabonis** (0–1)	—	18,003	35–82	L3
118	August 11	Red Sox	4–6	Kelly (4–0)	**Wright** (3–1)	Kimbrel (34)	24,051	35–83	L4
119	August 12	Red Sox	1–4	Sale (12–4)	**Cobb** (3–15)	Kimbrel (35)	25,303	35–84	L5
120	August 14	Mets	6–3	**Cashner** (4–10)	Wahl (0–1)	**Givens** (4)	20,527	36–84	W1
121	August 15	Mets	5–16	Wheeler (8–6)	**Bundy** (7–11)	—	25,045	36–85	L1
122	August 17	@ Indians	1–2	Carrasco (15–6)	**Hess** (2–7)	Allen (24)	28,264	36–86	L2
123	August 18	@ Indians	4–2	**Cobb** (4–15)	Plutko (4–3)	—	35,007	37–86	W1
124	August 19	@ Indians	0–8	Clevinger (9–7)	**Ramírez** (1–5)	—	30,555	37–87	L1
125	August 20	@ Blue Jays	3–5	Estrada (7–9)	**Cashner** (4–11)	Giles (16)	25,031	37–88	L2
126	August 21	@ Blue Jays	2–8	Gaviglio (3–6)	**Bundy** (7–12)	—	25,855	37–89	L3
127	August 22	@ Blue Jays	0–6	Pannone (1–0)	**Hess** (2–8)	—	40,595	37–90	L4
128	August 24	Yankees	5–7 (10)	Green (7–2)	**Carroll** (0–2)	Britton (5)	27,150	37–91	L5
129	August 25	Yankees	3–10	Happ (15–6)	**Yacabonis** (0–2)	Cessa (1)	32,445	37–92	L6
130	August 25	Yankees	1–5	Gray (10–8)	**Cashner** (4–12)	Betances (1)	26,236	37–93	L7
131	August 26	Yankees	3–5	Severino (17–6)	**Bundy** (7–13)	Robertson (4)	17,343	37–94	L8
132	August 27	Blue Jays	7–0	**Hess** (3–8)	Gaviglio (3–7)	—	15,436	38–94	W1
133	August 28	Blue Jays	12–5	**Rogers** (1–0)	Pannone (1–1)	—	11,762	39–94	W2
134	August 29	Blue Jays	10–5	**Gilmartin** (1–0)	Barnes (2–2)	**Givens** (5)	11,834	40–94	W3
135	August 31	@ Royals	2–9	Keller (7–5)	**Cashner** (4–13)	—	15,394	40–95	L1

September: 7–20 (Home: 4–9; Away: 3–11)

#	Date	Opponent	Score	Win	Loss	Save	Attendance	Record	Box/ Streak
136	September 1	@ Royals	4–5	Newberry (1–0)	**Givens** (0–7)	—	15,358	40–96	L2
137	September 2	@ Royals	1–9	López (1–3)	**Hess** (3–9)	—	18,463	40–97	L3
138	September 3	@ Mariners	1–2	Ramírez (2–3)	**Rogers** (1–1)	Díaz (52)	20,579	40–98	L4
139	September 4	@ Mariners	5–3	**Cobb** (5–15)	Warren (2–2)	**Givens** (6)	11,265	41–98	W1
140	September 5	@ Mariners	2–5	Leake (9–9)	**Cashner** (4–14)	Díaz (53)	15,017	41–99	L1
141	September 7	@ Rays	2–14	Snell (18–5)	**Bundy** (7–14)	—	12,436	41–100	L2
142	September 8	@ Rays	5–10	Yarbrough (14–5)	**Hess** (3–10)	—	10,275	41–101	L3
143	September 9	@ Rays	3–8	Chirinos (4–5)	**Rogers** (1–2)	—	13,632	41–102	L4
144	September 11	Athletics	2–3	Fiers (12–6)	**Wright** (3–2)	Familia (18)	9,141	41–103	L5
145	September 12	Athletics	0–10	Mengden (7–6)	**Cashner** (4–15)	—	10,480	41–104	L6
146	September 13	Athletics	5–3	**Bundy** (8–14)	Anderson (3–5)	**Givens** (7)	11,714	42–104	W1
147	September 14	White Sox	6–8	Shields (7–16)	**Ortiz** (0–1)	Jones (5)	18,265	42–105	L1
148	September 15	White Sox	0–2	López (6–9)	**Ramirez** (1–6)	Minaya (1)	23,266	42–106	L2
149	September 16	White Sox	8–4	**Meisinger** (1–0)	Giolito (10–11)	**Fry** (1)	19,104	43–106	W1
150	September 17	Blue Jays	0–5	Borucki (4–4)	**Phillips** (0–1)	—	8,198	43–107	L1
151	September 18	Blue Jays	4–6	Petricka (3–1)	**Bundy** (8–15)	Giles (23)	9,096	43–108	L2
152	September 19	Blue Jays	2–1	**Wright** (4–2)	Estrada (7–13)	**Givens** (8)	11,337	44–108	W1
153	September 21	@ Yankees	8–10	CC Sabathia (8–7)	**Ramírez** (1–7)	Betances (4)	39,903	44–109	L1
154	September 22	@ Yankees	2–3 (11)	Kahnle (2–0)	**Fry** (0–2)	—	40,185	44–110	L2
155	September 23	@ Yankees	6–3	**Meisinger** (2–0)	Cole (4–2)	**Givens** (9)	43,606	45–110	W1
156	September 24	@ Red Sox	2–6	Eovaldi (6–7)	**Bundy** (8–16)	—	35,619	45–111	L1
–	September 25	@ Red Sox	Postponed (rain). Makeup date September 26 as part of a doubleheader.						
157	September 26	@ Red Sox	3–19	Price (16–7)	**Meisinger** (2–1)	—	33,577	45–112	L2
158	September 26	@ Red Sox	10–3	**Scott** (3–2)	Barnes (6–4)	**Fry** (2)	34,445	46–112	W1
—	September 27	Astros	Postponed (rain). Makeup date September 29 as part of a doubleheader.						
159	September 28	Astros	1–2	Sipp (3–1)	**Scott** (3–3)	Osuna (21)	18,434	46–113	L1
160	September 29	Astros	3–4	Harris (5–3)	**Gilmartin** (1–1)	Rondón (15)	N/A	46–114	L2
161	September 29	Astros	2–5	Peacock (3–4)	**Ramírez** (1–8)	Pressly (2)	26,020	46–115	L3
162	September 30	Astros	4–0	**Fry** (1–2)	Peacock (3–5)	—	24,916	47–115	W1

== Roster ==
2018 Baltimore Orioles
Roster
Pitchers: 38 Pedro Araújo; 48 Richard Bleier; 35 Brad Brach; 53 Zach Britton; 37 Dylan Bundy; 49 Cody Carroll; 54 Andrew Cashner; 50 Miguel Castro; 17 Alex Cobb; 51 Nestor Cortés Jr.; 51 Paul Fry; 34 Kevin Gausman; 63 Sean Gilmartin; 60 Mychal Givens; 57 Donnie Hart; 41 David Hess; 59 Jhan Mariñez; 67 John Means; 52 Ryan Meisinger; 56 Darren O'Day; 59 Luis Ortiz; 58 Evan Phillips; 32 Yefry Ramírez; 65 Josh Rogers; 66 Tanner Scott; 30 Chris Tillman; 43 Mike Wright; 31 Jimmy Yacabonis	Catchers: 36 Caleb Joseph; 15 Chance Sisco; 27 Andrew Susac; 61 Austin Wynns; Infielders: 24 Pedro Álvarez; 1 Tim Beckham; 19 Chris Davis; 51,64 Corban Joseph; 13 Manny Machado; 39 Renato Núñez; 29 Jace Peterson; 3 Luis Sardiñas; 6 Jonathan Schoop; 2 Danny Valencia; 28 Breyvic Valera; 12 Engelb Vielma; 34,2 Jonathan Villar; 12 Steve Wilkerson	Outfielders: 34,64 John Andreoli; 14 Craig Gentry; 10 Adam Jones; 16 Trey Mancini; 3 Cedric Mullins; 28 Colby Rasmus; 23 Joey Rickard; 25 Anthony Santander; 62 D. J. Stewart; 45 Mark Trumbo	Manager: 26 Buck Showalter; Coaches: 88 Howie Clark (assistant hitting); 47 Scott Coolbaugh (hitting); 55 Einar Díaz (assistant); 11 Bobby Dickerson (third base); 21 Wayne Kirby (first base); 40 Roger McDowell (pitching); 75 Alan Mills (bullpen); 82 Jett Ruiz (bullpen catcher); 77 John Russell (bench)

== Player stats ==
=== Batting ===
Note: G = Games played; AB = At bats; R = Runs; H = Hits; 2B = Doubles; 3B = Triples; HR = Home runs; RBI = Runs batted in; SB = Stolen bases; BB = Walks; AVG = Batting average; SLG = Slugging average

Player	G	AB	R	H	2B	3B	HR	RBI	SB	BB	AVG	SLG
Trey Mancini	156	582	69	141	23	3	24	58	0	44	.242	.416
Adam Jones	145	580	54	163	35	0	15	63	7	24	.281	.419
Chris Davis	128	470	40	79	12	0	16	49	2	41	.168	.296
Tim Beckham	96	369	45	85	17	0	12	35	1	27	.230	.374
Manny Machado	96	365	48	115	21	1	24	65	8	45	.315	.575
Jonathan Schoop	85	349	45	85	18	1	17	40	0	12	.244	.447
Mark Trumbo	90	330	41	86	12	0	17	44	0	24	.261	.452
Caleb Joseph	82	265	28	58	14	2	3	17	2	10	.219	.321
Danny Valencia	78	255	28	67	8	1	9	28	1	22	.263	.408
Joey Rickard	79	213	27	52	10	1	8	23	4	15	.244	.413
Jonathan Villar	54	209	28	54	4	0	8	24	21	22	.258	.392
Renato Núñez	60	200	26	55	13	0	7	20	0	16	.275	.445
Jace Peterson	93	200	21	39	13	2	3	28	13	30	.195	.325
Cedric Mullins	45	170	23	40	9	0	4	11	2	17	.235	.359
Chance Sisco	63	160	13	29	8	0	2	16	1	13	.181	.269
Craig Gentry	68	156	13	42	5	2	1	11	12	11	.269	.346
Pedro Álvarez	45	111	18	20	2	0	8	18	0	16	.180	.414
Austin Wynns	42	110	16	28	2	0	4	11	0	5	.255	.382
Anthony Santander	33	101	8	20	5	1	1	6	1	6	.198	.297
John Andreoli	23	56	4	13	2	0	0	4	2	4	.232	.268
Steve Wilkerson	16	46	2	8	3	0	0	3	1	3	.174	.239
Colby Rasmus	18	45	5	6	1	0	1	1	0	3	.133	.222
DJ Stewart	17	40	8	10	3	0	3	10	2	4	.250	.550
Breyvic Valera	12	35	4	10	0	1	0	4	1	3	.286	.343
Andrew Susac	9	26	1	3	1	0	0	0	0	0	.115	.154
Luis Sardiñas	8	18	2	2	0	0	1	1	0	2	.111	.278
Corban Joseph	14	18	1	4	1	0	0	3	0	1	.222	.278
Engelb Vielma	6	7	1	1	0	0	0	0	0	1	.143	.143
Pitcher totals	162	21	3	2	0	0	0	0	0	1	.095	.095
Team totals	162	5507	622	1317	242	15	188	593	81	422	.239	.391

=== Pitching ===
Note: W = Wins; L = Losses; ERA = Earned run average; G = Games pitched; GS = Games started; SV = Saves; IP = Innings pitched; H = Hits allowed; R = Runs allowed; ER = Earned runs allowed; BB = Walks allowed; SO = Strikeouts

Player	W	L	ERA	G	GS	SV	IP	H	R	ER	BB	SO
Dylan Bundy	8	16	5.45	31	31	0	171.2	188	116	104	54	184
Andrew Cashner	4	15	5.29	28	28	0	153.0	177	97	90	65	99
Alex Cobb	5	15	4.90	28	28	0	152.1	172	93	83	43	102
Kevin Gausman	5	8	4.43	21	21	0	124.0	139	62	61	32	104
David Hess	3	10	4.88	21	19	0	103.1	106	64	56	37	74
Miguel Castro	2	7	3.96	63	1	0	86.1	75	41	38	50	57
Mike Wright	4	2	5.55	48	2	0	84.1	101	55	52	36	74
Mychal Givens	0	7	3.99	69	0	9	76.2	61	37	34	30	79
Yefry Ramírez	1	8	5.92	17	12	0	65.1	64	44	43	36	62
Tanner Scott	3	3	5.40	53	0	0	53.1	55	33	32	28	76
Jimmy Yacabonis	0	2	5.40	12	7	0	40.0	40	25	24	18	33
Brad Brach	1	2	4.85	42	0	11	39.0	50	24	21	19	38
Paul Fry	1	2	3.35	35	0	2	37.2	33	20	14	15	36
Richard Bleier	3	0	1.93	31	0	0	32.2	36	7	7	4	15
Pedro Araújo	1	3	7.71	20	0	0	28.0	29	24	24	18	29
Sean Gilmartin	1	1	3.00	12	0	0	27.0	23	9	9	11	15
Chris Tillman	1	5	10.46	7	7	0	26.2	42	32	31	17	13
Ryan Meisinger	2	1	6.43	18	1	0	21.0	18	15	15	10	21
Darren O'Day	0	2	3.60	20	0	2	20.0	18	9	8	4	27
Donnie Hart	0	0	5.59	20	0	0	19.1	31	13	12	12	13
Cody Carroll	0	2	9.00	15	0	0	17.0	21	17	17	13	16
Zack Britton	1	0	3.45	16	0	4	15.2	11	6	6	10	13
Josh Rogers	1	2	8.49	3	3	0	11.2	17	11	11	5	6
Jhan Mariñez	0	0	5.63	8	0	0	8.0	9	6	5	9	3
Evan Phillips	0	1	18.56	5	1	0	5.1	7	13	11	6	5
Nestor Cortés Jr.	0	0	7.71	4	0	0	4.2	10	4	4	4	3
John Means	0	0	13.50	1	0	0	3.1	6	5	5	0	4
Luis Ortiz	0	1	15.43	2	1	0	2.1	7	6	4	3	0
Jace Peterson	0	0	36.00	1	0	0	1.0	6	4	4	0	1
Danny Valencia	0	0	0.00	1	0	0	0.1	0	0	0	0	1
Team totals	47	115	5.18	162	162	28	1431.0	1552	892	824	589	1203

== Farm system ==
Level	Team	League	Manager
AAA	Norfolk Tides	International League	Ron Johnson
AA	Bowie Baysox	Eastern League	Gary Kendall
A-Advanced	Frederick Keys	Carolina League	Keith Bodie
A	Delmarva Shorebirds	South Atlantic League	Ryan Minor
Short-Season A	Aberdeen IronBirds	New York–Penn League	Kevin Bradshaw
Rookie	GCL Orioles	Gulf Coast League	Carlos Tosca
Rookie	DSL Orioles	Dominican Summer League	Elvis Morel
