= 2018 Tampa Bay Rays season =

2018 Tampa Bay Rays
- League: American League
- Division: East
- Ballpark: Tropicana Field
- City: St. Petersburg, Florida
- Record: 90–72 (.556)
- Divisional place: 3rd
- Owners: Stuart Sternberg
- Managers: Kevin Cash
- Television: Fox Sports Sun; Fox Sports Florida (Dewayne Staats, Brian Anderson)
- Radio: Tampa Bay Rays Radio Network (English) (Andy Freed, Dave Wills); WGES (Spanish) (Ricardo Taveras, Enrique Oliu)

The Tampa Bay Rays 2018 season was the Rays' 21st season of Major League Baseball, and the 11th as the "Rays" (all at Tropicana Field). The Rays played this season with few starting pitchers. Many games were started by pitchers normally used in relief, referred to as openers. This approach saw the Rays set MLB single season records for most no decisions by starters (91) and most wins by relievers (55). They finished the season with a 90–72 record, their first winning season since 2013; however, for the fifth consecutive year, they failed to make the postseason. This was because the Red Sox had 108 wins for the division title, while the Yankees had 100 wins and the Athletics had 97 wins for the wild card.

== Offseason ==
On December 11, 2017, the Rays acquired Joey Wendle in a trade in exchange for a player to be named later. One day later, the Rays traded minor leaguer Deion Tansel to the San Diego Padres for Ryan Schimpf.

On December 20, 2017, the Rays traded longtime franchise player Evan Longoria to the San Francisco Giants for Denard Span, Christian Arroyo, and two other prospects.

On February 21, 2018, the Rays were involved in a three team trade, trading Steven Souza Jr. to the Arizona Diamondbacks and receiving Anthony Banda and two players to be named later, from the Diamondbacks and Nick Solak from the New York Yankees. The next day, the Rays traded Corey Dickerson to the Pittsburgh Pirates for Daniel Hudson, minor leaguer Tristan Gray, and $1 million.

== Season standings ==
=== American League East ===
AL East
Team	W	L	Pct.	GB	Home	Road
Boston Red Sox	108	54	.667	—	57‍–‍24	51‍–‍30
New York Yankees	100	62	.617	8	53‍–‍28	47‍–‍34
Tampa Bay Rays	90	72	.556	18	51‍–‍30	39‍–‍42
Toronto Blue Jays	73	89	.451	35	40‍–‍41	33‍–‍48
Baltimore Orioles	47	115	.290	61	28‍–‍53	19‍–‍62

=== American League Wild Card ===
Division leaders
Team	W	L	Pct.
Boston Red Sox	108	54	.667
Houston Astros	103	59	.636
Cleveland Indians	91	71	.562

Wild Card teams (Top 2 teams qualify for postseason)
Team	W	L	Pct.	GB
New York Yankees	100	62	.617	+3
Oakland Athletics	97	65	.599	—
Tampa Bay Rays	90	72	.556	7
Seattle Mariners	89	73	.549	8
Los Angeles Angels	80	82	.494	17
Minnesota Twins	78	84	.481	19
Toronto Blue Jays	73	89	.451	24
Texas Rangers	67	95	.414	30
Detroit Tigers	64	98	.395	33
Chicago White Sox	62	100	.383	35
Kansas City Royals	58	104	.358	39
Baltimore Orioles	47	115	.290	50

=== Record against opponents ===
2018 American League record Source: MLB Standings Grid – 2018
Team	BAL	BOS	CWS	CLE	DET	HOU	KC	LAA	MIN	NYY	OAK	SEA	TB	TEX	TOR	NL
Baltimore	—	3–16	3–4	2–5	2–4	1–6	2–4	1–5	1–6	7–12	1–5	1–6	8–11	3–4	5–14	7–13
Boston	16–3	—	3–4	3–4	4–2	3–4	5–1	6–0	4–3	10–9	2–4	4–3	11–8	6–1	15–4	16–4
Chicago	4–3	4–3	—	5–14	7–12	0–7	11–8	2–5	7–12	2–4	2–5	2–4	4–2	4–3	2–4	6–14
Cleveland	5–2	4–3	14–5	—	13–6	3–4	12–7	3–3	10–9	2–5	2–4	2–5	2–4	4–2	3–4	12–8
Detroit	4–2	2–4	12–7	6–13	—	1–5	8–11	3–4	7–12	3–4	0–7	3–4	2–4	3–4	4–3	6–14
Houston	6–1	4–3	7–0	4–3	5–1	—	5–1	13–6	4–2	2–5	12–7	9–10	3–4	12–7	4–2	13–7
Kansas City	4–2	1–5	8–11	7–12	11–8	1–5	—	1–6	10–9	2–5	2–5	1–5	0–7	2–5	2–5	6–14
Los Angeles	5–1	0–6	5–2	3–3	4–3	6–13	6–1	—	4–3	1–5	10–9	8–11	1–6	13–6	4–3	10–10
Minnesota	6–1	3–4	12–7	9–10	12–7	2–4	9–10	3–4	—	2–5	2–5	1–5	3–4	2–4	4–2	8–12
New York	12–7	9–10	4–2	5–2	4–3	5–2	5–2	5–1	5–2	—	3–3	5–1	10–9	4–3	13–6	11–9
Oakland	5–1	4–2	5–2	4–2	7–0	7–12	5–2	9–10	5–2	3–3	—	9–10	2–5	13–6	7–0	12–8
Seattle	6–1	3–4	4–2	5–2	4–3	10–9	5–1	11–8	5–1	1–5	10–9	—	6–1	10–9	3–4	6–14
Tampa Bay	11–8	8–11	2–4	4–2	4–2	4–3	7–0	6–1	4–3	9–10	5–2	1–6	—	5–1	13–6	7–13
Texas	4–3	1–6	3–4	2–4	4–3	7–12	5–2	6–13	4–2	3–4	6–13	9–10	1–5	—	3–3	9–11
Toronto	14–5	4–15	4–2	4–3	3–4	2–4	5–2	3–4	2–4	6–13	0–7	4–3	6–13	3–3	—	13–7

== Detailed records ==
American League
Opponent	Home	Away	Total	Pct.
AL East
Baltimore Orioles	7-2	4-6	11-8	.579
Boston Red Sox	5-5	3-6	8-11	.421
New York Yankees	6-4	3-6	9-10	.474
Toronto Blue Jays	7-2	6-4	13-6	.684
Tampa Bay Rays	-	-	-	
	27-13	16-22	43-35	.551
AL Central
Detroit Tigers	3-0	1-2	4-2	.667
Cleveland Indians	2-1	2-1	4-2	.667
Kansas City Royals	4-0	3-0	7-0	1.000
Minnesota Twins	3-0	1-3	4-3	.571
Chicago White Sox	0-3	2-1	2-4	.333
	12–4	9–7	21–11	.656
AL West
Oakland Athletics	2–1	3–1	5–2	.714
Houston Astros	3-1	1–2	4–3	.571
Los Angeles Angels	3-0	3–1	6–1	.857
Seattle Mariners	1–3	0–3	1–6	.143
Texas Rangers	2–1	3–0	5–1	.833
	11–6	10–7	21–13	.618

National League
Opponent	Home	Away	Total	Pct.
Washington Nationals	2-0	0–2	2–2	.500
New York Mets	-	2–1	2–1	.667
Atlanta Braves	0-2	1-1	1–3	.250
Philadelphia Phillies	0-3	-	0-3	.000
Miami Marlins	1-2	1-2	2–4	.333
	3–8	4–5	7–13	.350

== Game log ==
Legend
	Rays win
	Rays loss
	Postponement
**Bold**	Rays team member

2018 Game Log: 90–72 (Home: 51–30; Away: 39–42)
March: 1–2 (Home: 1–2; Away: 0–0)

#	Date	Opponent	Score	Win	Loss	Save	Attendance	Record	Streak/Recap
1	March 29	Red Sox	6–4	**Pruitt** (1–0)	Smith (0–1)	**Colomé** (1)	31,042	1–0	W1
2	March 30	Red Sox	0–1	Price (1–0)	**Roe** (0–1)	Kimbrel (1)	19,203	1–1	L1
3	March 31	Red Sox	2–3	Porcello (1–0)	**Kittredge** (0–1)	Kimbrel (2)	17,838	1–2	L2

April: 12–12 (Home: 5–5; Away: 7–7)

#	Date	Opponent	Score	Win	Loss	Save	Attendance	Record	Streak/Recap
4	April 1	Red Sox	1–2	Velázquez (1–0)	**Alvarado** (0–1)	Kelly (1)	14,256	1–3	L3
—	April 2	@ Yankees	Postponed (snow); Makeup: April 3						
5	April 3	@ Yankees	4–11	Kahnle (1–0)	**Pruitt** (1–1)	—	46,776	1–4	L4
6	April 4	@ Yankees	2–7	Severino (2–0)	**Snell** (0–1)	—	40,028	1–5	L5
7	April 5	@ Red Sox	2–3 (12)	Poyner (1–0)	**Kittredge** (0–2)	—	36,134	1–6	L6
8	April 7	@ Red Sox	3–10	Porcello (2–0)	**Faria** (0–1)	—	31,821	1–7	L7
9	April 8	@ Red Sox	7–8	Smith (1–1)	**Colomé** (0–1)	Kimbrel (3)	31,979	1–8	L8
10	April 9	@ White Sox	5–4	**Archer** (1–0)	González (0–2)	**Colomé** (2)	10,377	2–8	W1
11	April 10	@ White Sox	6–5	**Snell** (1–1)	Fulmer (0–1)	**Colomé** (3)	10,069	3–8	W2
12	April 11	@ White Sox	1–2	Rondón (1–0)	**Pruitt** (1–2)	Jones (1)	10,431	3–9	L1
13	April 13	Phillies	1–2	Ramos (1–0)	**Colomé** (0–2)	Neris (2)	13,372	3–10	L2
14	April 14	Phillies	4–9	Arrieta (1–0)	**Archer** (1–1)	—	20,934	3–11	L3
15	April 15	Phillies	4–10	Ríos (1–0)	**Yarbrough** (0–1)	—	19,841	3–12	L4
16	April 16	Rangers	8–4	**Snell** (2–1)	Pérez (1–2)	—	9,363	4–12	W1
17	April 17	Rangers	2–7	Moore (1–3)	**Chirinos** (0–1)	—	8,972	4–13	L1
18	April 18	Rangers	4–2	**Faria** (1–1)	Hamels (1–3)	**Colomé** (4)	8,657	5–13	W1
19	April 20	Twins	8–7 (10)	**Colomé** (1–2)	Duke (1–1)	—	9,786	6–13	W2
20	April 21	Twins	10–1	**Snell** (3–1)	Gibson (1–1)	—	10,106	7–13	W3
21	April 22	Twins	8–6	**Colomé** (2–2)	Reed (0–1)	—	12,515	8–13	W4
—	April 24	@ Orioles	Postponed (rain); Makeup: May 12						
22	April 25	@ Orioles	8–4	**Kittredge** (1–2)	Cobb (0–3)	—	8,730	9–13	W5
23	April 26	@ Orioles	9–5	**Archer** (2–1)	Bundy (1–3)	—	9,596	10–13	W6
24	April 27	@ Red Sox	4–3	**Snell** (4–1)	Pomeranz (0–1)	**Colomé** (5)	32,620	11–13	W7
25	April 28	@ Red Sox	12–6	**Yarbrough** (1–1)	Price (2–3)	—	35,795	12–13	W8
26	April 29	@ Red Sox	3–4	Kimbrel (1–1)	**Colomé** (2–3)	—	32,888	12–14	L1
27	April 30	@ Tigers	3–2	**Faria** (2–1)	Grene (1–2)	**Alvarado** (1)	19,398	13–14	W1

May: 15–13 (Home: 5–6; Away: 10–7)

#	Date	Opponent	Score	Win	Loss	Save	Attendance	Record	Streak/Recap
28	May 1	@ Tigers	1–2	Boyd (1–2)	**Archer** (2–2)	Greene (5)	17,255	13–15	L1
29	May 2	@ Tigers	2–3 (12)	Saupold (1–0)	**Andriese** (0–1)	—	20,866	13–16	L2
30	May 4	Blue Jays	6–2	**Yarbrough** (2–1)	Happ (4–2)	—	11,117	14–16	W1
31	May 5	Blue Jays	5–3	**Faria** (3–1)	Sanchez (2–3)	**Colomé** (6)	16,297	15–16	W2
32	May 6	Blue Jays	1–2	Tepera (2–1)	**Colomé** (2–4)	Osuna (9)	14,032	15–17	L1
33	May 8	Braves	0–1	Newcomb (3–1)	**Snell** (4–2)	Vizcaíno (5)	15,382	15–18	L2
34	May 9	Braves	2–5	Teherán (3–1)	**Yarbrough** (2–2)	Vizcaíno (6)	12,082	15–19	L3
35	May 11	@ Orioles	4–9	Gausman (3–2)	**Faria** (3–2)	Brach (5)	28,170	15–20	L4
36	May 12 (1)	@ Orioles	3–6	Hess (1–0)	**Archer** (2–3)	Givens (1)	24,534	15–21	L5
37	May 12 (2)	@ Orioles	10–3	**Romo** (1–0)	Cobb (0–5)	—	24,534	16–21	W1
38	May 13	@ Orioles	1–17	Bundy (2–5)	**Snell** (4–3)	—	25,257	16–22	L1
39	May 14	@ Royals	2–1	**Yarbrough** (3–2)	Skoglund (1–3)	**Colomé** (7)	14,174	17–22	W1
40	May 15	@ Royals	6–5	**Venters** (1–0)	Herrera (1–1)	**Colomé** (8)	21,500	18–22	W2
41	May 16	@ Royals	5–3	**Andriese** (1–1)	Hammel (0–5)	**Colomé** (9)	19,611	19–22	W3
42	May 17	@ Angels	7–1	**Archer** (3–3)	Skaggs (3–3)	—	30,487	20–22	W4
43	May 18	@ Angels	8–3	**Snell** (5–3)	Tropeano (1–3)	—	40,067	21–22	W5
44	May 19	@ Angels	5–3	**Yarbrough** (4–2)	Heaney (2–3)	**Colomé** (10)	37,232	22–22	W6
45	May 20	@ Angels	2–5	Ohtani (4–1)	**Andriese** (1–2)	Parker (2)	38,560	22–23	L1
46	May 22	Red Sox	2–4	Sale (5–1)	**Faria** (3–3)	Kimbrel (14)	10,642	22–24	L2
47	May 23	Red Sox	1–4	Kelly (3–0)	**Colomé** (2–5)	Kimbrel (15)	10,194	22–25	L3
48	May 24	Red Sox	6–3	**Snell** (6–3)	Porcello (6–2)	**Colomé** (11)	12,468	23–25	W1
49	May 25	Orioles	0–2	Hess (2–1)	**Romo** (1–1)	Brach (8)	11,354	23–26	L1
50	May 26	Orioles	5–1	**Banda** (1–0)	Cashner (2–6)	—	14,744	24–26	W1
51	May 27	Orioles	8–3	**Nuño** (1–0)	Gausman (3–4)	**Pruitt** (1)	13,311	25–26	W2
52	May 28	@ Athletics	1–0 (13)	**Stanek** (1–0)	Hatcher (3–2)	**Venters** (1)	10,881	26–26	W3
53	May 29	@ Athletics	4–3	**Snell** (7–3)	Gossett (0–3)	**Romo** (1)	7,521	27–26	W4
54	May 30	@ Athletics	6–0	**Eovaldi** (1–0)	Manaea (5–6)	—	6,705	28–26	W5
55	May 31	@ Athletics	3–7	Mengden (6–4)	**Stanek** (1–1)	Treinen (13)	12,070	28–27	L1

June: 13–14 (Home: 11–4; Away: 2–10)

#	Date	Opponent	Score	Win	Loss	Save	Attendance	Record	Streak/Recap
56	June 1	@ Mariners	3–4 (13)	Elías (1–0)	**Andriese** (1–3)	—	22,636	28–28	L2
57	June 2	@ Mariners	1–3	Gonzales (6–3)	**Archer** (3–4)	Díaz (20)	28,599	28–29	L3
58	June 3	@ Mariners	1–2	Hernandez (6–4)	**Alvarado** (0–2)	Díaz (21)	26,567	28–30	L4
59	June 5	@ Nationals	2–4	Scherzer (10–1)	**Eovaldi** (1–1)	Doolittle (15)	32,165	28–31	L5
60	June 6	@ Nationals	2–11	Roark (3–6)	**Venters** (1–1)	—	33,106	28–32	L6
61	June 7	Mariners	4–5	Leake (6–3)	**Pruitt** (1–3)	—	10,342	28–33	L7
62	June 8	Mariners	3–4	Gonzales (7–3)	**Font** (0–3)	Díaz (22)	12,435	28–34	L8
63	June 9	Mariners	7–3	**Snell** (8–3)	Hernandez (6–5)	**Roe** (1)	12,258	29–34	W1
64	June 10	Mariners	4–5	Paxton (6–1)	**Alvarado** (0–3)	Díaz (23)	10,512	29–35	L1
65	June 11	Blue Jays	8–4	**Yarbrough** (5–2)	Gaviglio (2–2)	—	10,769	30–35	W1
66	June 12	Blue Jays	4–1	**Pruitt** (2–3)	García (2–5)	**Romo** (2)	11,162	31–35	W2
67	June 13	Blue Jays	1–0	**Castillo** (1–0)	Tepera (3–2)	—	10,847	32–35	W3
68	June 14	@ Yankees	3–4	Germán (1–4)	**Snell** (8–4)	Chapman (19)	45,066	32–36	L1
69	June 15	@ Yankees	0–5	Loáisiga (1–0)	**Eovaldi** (1–2)	—	45,112	32–37	L2
70	June 16	@ Yankees	1–4	Severino (10–2)	**Yarbrough** (5–3)	Chapman (20)	46,249	32–38	L3
71	June 17	@ Yankees	3–1	**Roe** (1–1)	Sabathia (4–2)	**Romo** (3)	46,400	33–38	W1
72	June 18	@ Astros	4–5	McHugh (2–0)	**Romo** (1–2)	—	34,151	33–39	L1
73	June 19	@ Astros	2–1	**Snell** (9–4)	Rondón (1–2)	**Romo** (4)	37,414	34–39	W1
74	June 20	@ Astros	1–5	Morton (9–1)	**Eovaldi** (1–3)	—	43,409	34–40	L1
75	June 22	Yankees	2–1	**Yarbrough** (6–3)	Sabathia (4–3)	**Romo** (5)	27,252	35–40	W1
76	June 23	Yankees	4–0	**Font** (1–3)	Gray (5–5)	—	29,831	36–40	W2
77	June 24	Yankees	7–6 (12)	**Yarbrough** (7–3)	Shreve (2–2)	—	23,667	37–40	W3
78	June 25	Nationals	11–0	**Snell** (10–4)	González (6–5)	—	13,624	38–40	W4
79	June 26	Nationals	1–0	**Eovaldi** (2–3)	Scherzer (10–4)	**Romo** (6)	14,289	39–40	W5
80	June 28	Astros	0–1	McCullers Jr. (9–3)	**Yarbrough** (7–4)	Rondón (5)	12,305	39–41	L1
81	June 29	Astros	3–2	**Font** (2–3)	Cole (9–2)	**Alvarado** (2)		40–41	W1
82	June 30	Astros	5–2	**Nuño** (2–0)	Verlander (9–4)	**Romo** (7)	18,378	41–41	W2

July: 13–12 (Home: 8–3; Away: 5–9)

#	Date	Opponent	Score	Win	Loss	Save	Attendance	Record	Streak/Recap
83	July 1	Astros	3–2	**Snell** (11–4)	Morton (10–2)	**Romo** (8)	19,334	42–41	W3
84	July 2	@ Marlins	2–3 (10)	Rucinski (3–1)	**Stanek** (1–2)	—	6,004	42–42	L1
85	July 3	@ Marlins	9–6 (16)	**Nuño** (3–0)	Graves (0–1)	**Alvarado** (3)	6,259	43–42	W1
86	July 4	@ Marlins	0–3	Rucinski (4–1)	**Weber** (0–1)	Ziegler (10)	7,572	43–43	L1
87	July 6	@ Mets	1–5	Familia (4–4)	**Roe** (1–2)	—	24,236	43–44	L2
88	July 7	@ Mets	3–0	**Snell** (12–4)	Matz (4–6)	**Romo** (9)	32,986	44–44	W1
89	July 8	@ Mets	9–0	**Eovaldi** (3–3)	Flexen (0–2)	—	24,653	45–44	W2
90	July 9	Tigers	10–9 (10)	**Andriese** (2–3)	Hardy (3–2)	—	14,229	46–44	W3
91	July 10	Tigers	5–2	**Alvarado** (1–3)	Boyd (4–8)	**Romo** (10)	13,478	47–44	W4
92	July 11	Tigers	4–2	**Yarbrough** (8–4)	Zimmermann (4–1)	**Romo** (11)	13,922	48–44	W5
93	July 12	@ Twins	1–5	Gibson (4–6)	**Snell** (12–5)	Rodney (21)	25,281	48–45	L1
94	July 13	@ Twins	8–11	Hildenberger (2–2)	**Eovaldi** (3–4)	—	28,756	48–46	L2
95	July 14	@ Twins	19–6	**Schultz** (1–0)	Duke (3–3)	—	25,094	49–46	W1
96	July 15	@ Twins	7–11 (10)	Busenitz (3–0)	**Andriese** (2–4)	—	25,561	49–47	L1
**89th All-Star Game in Washington, D.C.**
97	July 20	Marlins	5–6	Straily (4–4)	**Castillo** (1–1)	Conley (1)	13,248	49–48	L2
98	July 21	Marlins	2–3	López (2–1)	**Yarbrough** (8–5)	Barraclough (10)	13,808	49–49	L3
99	July 22	Marlins	6–4	**Kolarek** (1–0)	Barraclough (0–4)	—	11,828	50–49	W1
100	July 23	Yankees	7–6	**Andriese** (3–4)	Severino (14–3)	**Alvarado** (4)	14,670	51–49	W2
101	July 24	Yankees	0–4	Tanaka (8–2)	**Chirinos** (0–2)	—	19,579	51–50	L1
102	July 25	Yankees	3–2	**Castillo** (2–1)	Cessa (1–2)	**Romo** (12)	27,372	52–50	W1
103	July 26	@ Orioles	4–3	**Yarbrough** (9–5)	Cobb (2–14)	**Pruitt** (2)	19,025	53–50	W2
104	July 27	@ Orioles	5–15	Cashner (3–9)	**Archer** (3–5)	—	15,649	53–51	L1
105	July 28	@ Orioles	2–11	Gausman (5–8)	**Stanek** (1–3)	—	21,526	53–52	L2
106	July 29	@ Orioles	5–11	Bundy (7–9)	**Chirinos** (0–3)	—	22,454	53–53	L3
107	July 31	Angels	10–6	**Yarbrough** (10–5)	Skaggs (8–7)	—	15,858	54–53	W1

August: 17–10 (Home: 11–4; Away: 6–6)

#	Date	Opponent	Score	Win	Loss	Save	Attendance	Record	Streak/Recap
108	August 1	Angels	7–2	**Faria** (4–3)	Tropeano (4–6)	—	9,132	55–53	W2
109	August 2	Angels	4–2	**Beeks** (1–1)	Heaney (6–7)	**Romo** (13)	10,988	56–53	W3
110	August 3	White Sox	2–3 (10)	Danish (1–0)	**Alvarado** (1–4)	Santiago (1)	16,144	56–54	L1
111	August 4	White Sox	1–2	Cedeño (2–0)	**Chirinos** (0–4)	Vieira (1)	21,214	56–55	L2
112	August 5	White Sox	7–8	Santiago (4–3)	**Castillo** (2–2)	—	14,739	56–56	L3
113	August 7	Orioles	4–3	**Romo** (2–2)	Castro (2–6)	—	11,734	57–56	W1
114	August 8	Orioles	4–5	Wright Jr. (3–0)	**Romo** (2–3)	Givens (3)	9,474	57–57	L1
115	August 9	Orioles	5–4	**Chirinos** (1–4)	Carroll (0–1)	**Romo** (14)	10,254	58–57	W1
116	August 10	@ Blue Jays	7–0	**Snell** (13–5)	Estrada (5–9)	—	23,082	59–57	W2
117	August 11	@ Blue Jays	3–1	**Castillo** (3–2)	Gaviglio (2–5)	**Romo** (15)	38,797	60–57	W3
118	August 12	@ Blue Jays	1–2	García (3–6)	**Alvarado** (1–5)	Giles (13)	33,746	60–58	L1
119	August 14	@ Yankees	1–4	Happ (13–6)	**Wood** (0–1)	Chapman (31)	40,393	60–59	L2
120	August 15	@ Yankees	6–1	**Yarbrough** (11–5)	Cessa (1–3)	—	42,716	61–59	W1
121	August 16	@ Yankees	3–1	**Snell** (14–5)	Tanaka (9–4)	**Kolarek** (1)	41,033	62–59	W2
122	August 17	@ Red Sox	3–7	Johnson (4–3)	**Chirinos** (1–5)	—	37,012	62–60	L1
123	August 18	@ Red Sox	2–5	Price (13–6)	**Glasnow** (1–3)	Kimbrel (37)	36,654	62–61	L2
124	August 19	@ Red Sox	2–0	**Beeks** (2–1)	Velázquez (7–1)	**Romo** (16)	37,242	63–61	W1
125	August 20	Royals	1–0	**Yarbrough** (12–5)	López (0–3)	**Alvarado** (5)	10,036	64–61	W2
126	August 21	Royals	4–1	**Snell** (15–5)	Sparkman (0–2)	**Romo** (17)	9,402	65–61	W3
127	August 22	Royals	6–3	**Chirinos** (2–5)	Junis (6–12)	**Romo** (18)	8,686	66–61	W4
128	August 23	Royals	4–3	**Romo** (3–3)	Flynn (3–5)	—	9,088	67–61	W5
129	August 24	Red Sox	10–3	**Beeks** (3–1)	Velázquez (7–2)	—	19,723	68–61	W6
130	August 25	Red Sox	5–1	**Stanek** (2–3)	Porcello (15–7)	—	25,695	69–61	W7
131	August 26	Red Sox	9–1	**Snell** (16–5)	Eovaldi (5–6)	—	23,448	70–61	W8
132	August 28	@ Braves	5–9	Brach (2–3)	**Roe** (1–3)	—	21,216	70–62	L1
133	August 29	@ Braves	8–5	**Beeks** (4–1)	Newcomb (11–7)	**Alvarado** (6)	20,876	71–62	W1
134	August 31	@ Indians	0–3	Kluber (17–7)	**Glasnow** (1–4)	Hand (31)	25,639	71–63	L1

September: 19–9 (Home: 10–6; Away: 9–3)

#	Date	Opponent	Score	Win	Loss	Save	Attendance	Record	Streak/Recap
135	September 1	@ Indians	5–3	**Snell** (17–5)	Bieber (8–3)	**Kolarek** (2)	31,816	72–63	W1
136	September 2	@ Indians	6–4	**Yarbrough** (13–5)	Carrasco (16–8)	**Alvarado** (7)	26,535	73–63	W2
137	September 3	@ Blue Jays	7–1	**Chirinos** (3–5)	Stroman (4–9)	—	18,034	74–63	W3
138	September 4	@ Blue Jays	4–0	**Wood** (1–1)	Borucki (3–4)	**Romo** (19)	17,594	75–63	W4
139	September 5	@ Blue Jays	3–10	Sanchez (4–5)	**Glasnow** (1–5)	—	17,872	75–64	L1
140	September 7	Orioles	14–2	**Snell** (18–5)	Bundy (7–14)	—	12,436	76–64	W1
141	September 8	Orioles	10–5	**Yarbrough** (14–5)	Hess (3–10)	—	10,275	77–64	W2
142	September 9	Orioles	8–3	**Chirinos** (4–5)	Rogers (1–2)	—	13,632	78–64	W3
143	September 10	Indians	6–5	**Schultz** (2–0)	Hand (2–5)	—	12,724	79–64	W4
144	September 11	Indians	0–2	Bieber (10–3)	**Glasnow** (1–6)	Allen (27)	10,599	79–65	L1
145	September 12	Indians	3–1	**Snell** (19–5)	Carrasco (16–9)	**Alvarado** (8)	10,654	80–65	W1
146	September 14	Athletics	1–2 (10)	Treinen (7–2)	**Schultz** (2–1)	—	11,549	80–66	L1
147	September 15	Athletics	7–5	**Kittredge** (2–2)	Familia (8–6)	**Romo** (20)	15,154	81–66	W1
148	September 16	Athletics	5–4	**Kittredge** (3–2)	Fiers (12–7)	**Romo** (21)	13,197	82–66	W2
149	September 17	@ Rangers	3–0	**Glasnow** (2–6)	Sampson (0–2)	**Romo** (22)	21,840	83–66	W3
150	September 18	@ Rangers	4–0	**Snell** (20–5)	Gallardo (8–6)	—	23,523	84–66	W4
151	September 19	@ Rangers	9–3	**Yarbrough** (15–5)	Méndez (2–2)	—	25,168	85–66	W5
152	September 20	@ Blue Jays	8–9	Paulino (1–0)	**Romo** (3–4)	—	19,478	85–67	L1
153	September 21	@ Blue Jays	11–3	**Beeks** (5–1)	Reid-Foley (2–4)	**Pruitt** (3)	21,167	86–67	W1
154	September 22	@ Blue Jays	2–5	Pannone (4–1)	**Glasnow** (2–7)	Giles (24)	27,648	86–68	L1
155	September 23	@ Blue Jays	5–2	**Snell** (21–5)	Borucki (4–5)	**Romo** (23)	23,944	87–68	W1
156	September 24	Yankees	1–4	Gray (11–9)	**Yarbrough** (15–6)	Britton (7)	13,832	87–69	L1
157	September 25	Yankees	2–9	Severino (19–8)	**Faria** (4–4)	—	10,953	87–70	L2
158	September 26	Yankees	8–7	**Chirinos** (5–5)	Tanaka (12–6)	**Romo** (24)	11,325	88–70	W1
159	September 27	Yankees	1–12	Sabathia (9–7)	**Schultz** (2–2)	—	12,349	88–71	L1
160	September 28	Blue Jays	6–7	Mayza (2–0)	**Alvarado** (1–6)	Giles (26)	12,061	88–72	L2
161	September 29	Blue Jays	4–3	**Castillo** (4–2)	Borucki (4–6)	**Romo** (25)	13,221	89–72	W1
162	September 30	Blue Jays	9–4	**Yarbrough** (16–6)	Gaviglio (3–10)	**Pruitt** (4)	13,313	90–72	W2

Legend: = Win = Loss = Postponement
Bold = Rays team member

== Roster ==
2018 Tampa Bay Rays
Roster
Pitchers: 46 José Alvarado; 35 Matt Andriese; 22 Chris Archer; 53 Anthony Banda; 68 Jalen Beeks; 63 Diego Castillo; 72 Yonny Chirinos; 37 Álex Colomé; 24 Nathan Eovaldi; 34 Jake Faria; 62 Wilmer Font; 20 Tyler Glasnow; 58 Chih-Wei Hu; 36 Andrew Kittredge; 56 Adam Kolarek; 60 Hoby Milner; 38 Vidal Nuño; 50 Austin Pruitt; 52 Chaz Roe; 54 Sergio Romo; 57 Jaime Schultz; 4 Blake Snell; 55 Ryne Stanek; 49 Jonny Venters; 47 Ryan Weber; 61 Hunter Wood; 48 Ryan Yarbrough	Catchers: 19 Nick Ciuffo; 31 Adam Moore; 43 Michael Pérez; 40 Wilson Ramos; 45 Jesús Sucre; Infielders: 1 Willy Adames; 21 Christian Arroyo; 9 Jake Bauers; 26 Ji-man Choi; 44 C. J. Cron; 5 Matt Duffy; 11 Adeiny Hechavarria; 35 Brandon Lowe; 13 Brad Miller; 28 Daniel Robertson; 29 Brandon Snyder; 11 Andrew Velazquez; 18 Joey Wendle	Outfielders: 10 Johnny Field; 27 Carlos Gómez; 39 Kevin Kiermaier; 17 Austin Meadows; 29 Tommy Pham; 8 Rob Refsnyder; 0 Mallex Smith; 2 Denard Span; 6 Justin Williams	Manager: 16 Kevin Cash; Coaches: 98 Mayo Acosta (bullpen catcher); 15 Rocco Baldelli (field coordinator); 41 Stan Boroski (bullpen); 99 Misha Dworken (bullpen catcher); 51 Chad Mottola (hitting); 25 Charlie Montoyo (bench); 33 Matt Quatraro (third base); 23 Kyle Snyder (pitching); 30 Ozzie Timmons (first base)

== Player stats ==
=== Batting ===
Note: G = Games played; AB = At bats; R = Runs; H = Hits; 2B = Doubles; 3B = Triples; HR = Home runs; RBI = Runs batted in; SB = Stolen bases; BB = Walks; AVG = Batting average; SLG = Slugging average

Player	G	AB	R	H	2B	3B	HR	RBI	SB	BB	AVG	SLG
Matt Duffy	132	503	59	148	22	1	4	44	12	47	.294	.366
C. J. Cron	140	501	68	127	28	1	30	74	1	37	.253	.493
Joey Wendle	139	487	62	146	33	6	7	61	16	37	.300	.435
Mallex Smith	141	480	65	142	27	10	2	40	40	47	.296	.406
Carlos Gómez	118	360	42	75	15	2	9	32	12	25	.208	.336
Kevin Kiermaier	88	332	44	72	12	9	7	29	10	25	.217	.370
Jake Bauers	96	323	48	65	22	2	11	48	6	54	.201	.384
Wilson Ramos	78	293	30	87	14	0	14	53	0	22	.297	.488
Willy Adames	85	288	43	80	7	0	10	34	6	31	.278	.406
Daniel Robertson	87	282	46	74	16	0	9	34	2	43	.262	.415
Adeiny Hechavarria	61	217	29	56	7	0	3	26	1	12	.258	.332
Jesús Sucre	73	182	9	38	5	0	1	17	1	9	.209	.253
Johnny Field	62	169	20	36	9	0	6	14	4	7	.213	.373
Ji-man Choi	49	160	21	43	12	1	8	27	2	24	.269	.506
Brad Miller	48	156	16	40	10	1	5	21	0	16	.256	.429
Tommy Pham	39	143	35	49	7	6	7	22	5	25	.343	.622
Denard Span	43	143	27	34	7	1	4	28	6	28	.238	.385
Brandon Lowe	43	129	16	30	6	2	6	25	2	16	.233	.450
Rob Refsnyder	40	84	10	14	3	0	2	5	0	18	.167	.274
Michael Pérez	24	74	9	21	5	0	1	11	0	3	.284	.392
Christian Arroyo	20	53	5	14	2	1	1	6	0	6	.264	.396
Nick Ciuffo	16	37	3	7	1	0	1	5	0	3	.189	.297
Austin Meadows	10	24	3	6	1	0	1	4	1	2	.250	.417
Adam Moore	8	18	2	4	1	0	1	2	0	1	.222	.444
Andrew Velazquez	13	10	3	3	1	0	0	0	1	1	.300	.400
Brandon Snyder	2	6	0	1	1	0	0	0	0	0	.167	.333
Justin Williams	1	1	0	0	0	0	0	0	0	0	.000	.000
Pitcher totals	162	20	1	3	0	0	0	2	0	1	.150	.150
Team totals	162	5475	716	1415	274	43	150	664	128	540	.258	.406

=== Pitching ===
Note: W = Wins; L = Losses; ERA = Earned run average; G = Games pitched; GS = Games started; SV = Saves; IP = Innings pitched; H = Hits allowed; R = Runs allowed; ER = Earned runs allowed; BB = Walks allowed; SO = Strikeouts

Player	W	L	ERA	G	GS	SV	IP	H	R	ER	BB	SO
Blake Snell	21	5	1.89	31	31	0	180.2	112	41	38	64	221
Ryan Yarbrough	16	6	3.91	38	6	0	147.1	140	70	64	50	128
Chris Archer	3	5	4.31	17	17	0	96.0	102	50	46	31	102
Yonny Chirinos	5	5	3.51	18	7	0	89.2	84	40	35	25	75
Austin Pruitt	2	3	4.65	23	0	4	69.2	72	40	36	16	42
Sergio Romo	3	4	4.14	73	5	25	67.1	65	31	31	20	75
Ryne Stanek	2	3	2.98	59	29	0	66.1	45	23	22	27	81
Jake Faria	4	4	5.40	17	12	0	65.0	60	39	39	33	50
José Alvarado	1	6	2.39	70	0	8	64.0	42	21	17	29	80
Matt Andriese	3	4	4.07	27	4	0	59.2	55	32	27	18	59
Nathan Eovaldi	3	4	4.26	10	10	0	57.0	48	27	27	8	53
Diego Castillo	4	2	3.18	43	11	0	56.2	36	21	20	18	65
Tyler Glasnow	1	5	4.20	11	11	0	55.2	42	27	26	19	64
Chaz Roe	1	3	3.58	61	0	1	50.1	35	21	20	16	53
Jalen Beeks	5	0	4.47	12	0	0	44.1	41	22	22	20	37
Hunter Wood	1	1	3.73	29	8	0	41.0	42	17	17	18	42
Andrew Kittredge	3	2	7.75	33	3	0	38.1	54	34	33	17	30
Adam Kolarek	1	0	3.93	31	0	2	34.1	38	15	15	5	19
Vidal Nuño	3	0	1.64	17	0	0	33.0	24	7	6	10	29
Jaime Schultz	2	2	5.64	22	1	0	30.1	18	19	19	17	35
Wilmer Font	2	1	1.67	9	5	0	27.0	15	5	5	11	20
Alex Colomé	2	5	4.15	23	0	11	21.2	24	12	10	8	23
Anthony Banda	1	0	3.68	3	1	0	14.2	12	6	6	3	10
Jonny Venters	1	1	3.86	22	1	1	14.0	11	6	6	6	11
Chih-Wei Hu	0	0	4.15	5	0	0	13.0	7	6	6	3	12
Ryan Weber	0	1	5.06	2	0	0	5.1	5	5	3	2	1
Hoby Milner	0	0	6.75	4	0	0	2.2	3	4	2	2	4
Daniel Robertson	0	0	0.00	1	0	0	1.0	0	0	0	0	0
Jesús Sucre	0	0	18.00	2	0	0	1.0	4	2	2	0	0
Johnny Field	0	0	0.00	1	0	0	1.0	0	0	0	1	0
Carlos Gómez	0	0	81.00	1	0	0	0.1	0	3	3	4	0
Team totals	90	72	3.74	162	162	52	1448.1	1236	646	602	501	1421

== Farm system ==
Level	Team	League	Manager
AAA	Durham Bulls	International League	Jared Sandberg
AA	Montgomery Biscuits	Southern League	Brady Williams
A-Advanced	Charlotte Stone Crabs	Florida State League	Reinaldo Ruiz
A	Bowling Green Hot Rods	Midwest League	Craig Albernaz
A-Short Season	Hudson Valley Renegades	New York–Penn League	Blake Butera
Rookie Advanced	Princeton Rays	Appalachian League	Danny Sheaffer
Rookie	GCL Rays	Gulf Coast League	Tomas Francisco
Foreign Rookie	DSL Rays 1	Dominican Summer League	Esteban Gonzalez
Foreign Rookie	DSL Rays 2	Dominican Summer League	Julio Zorrilla
