= Dillon Tate =

American baseball player (born 1994)

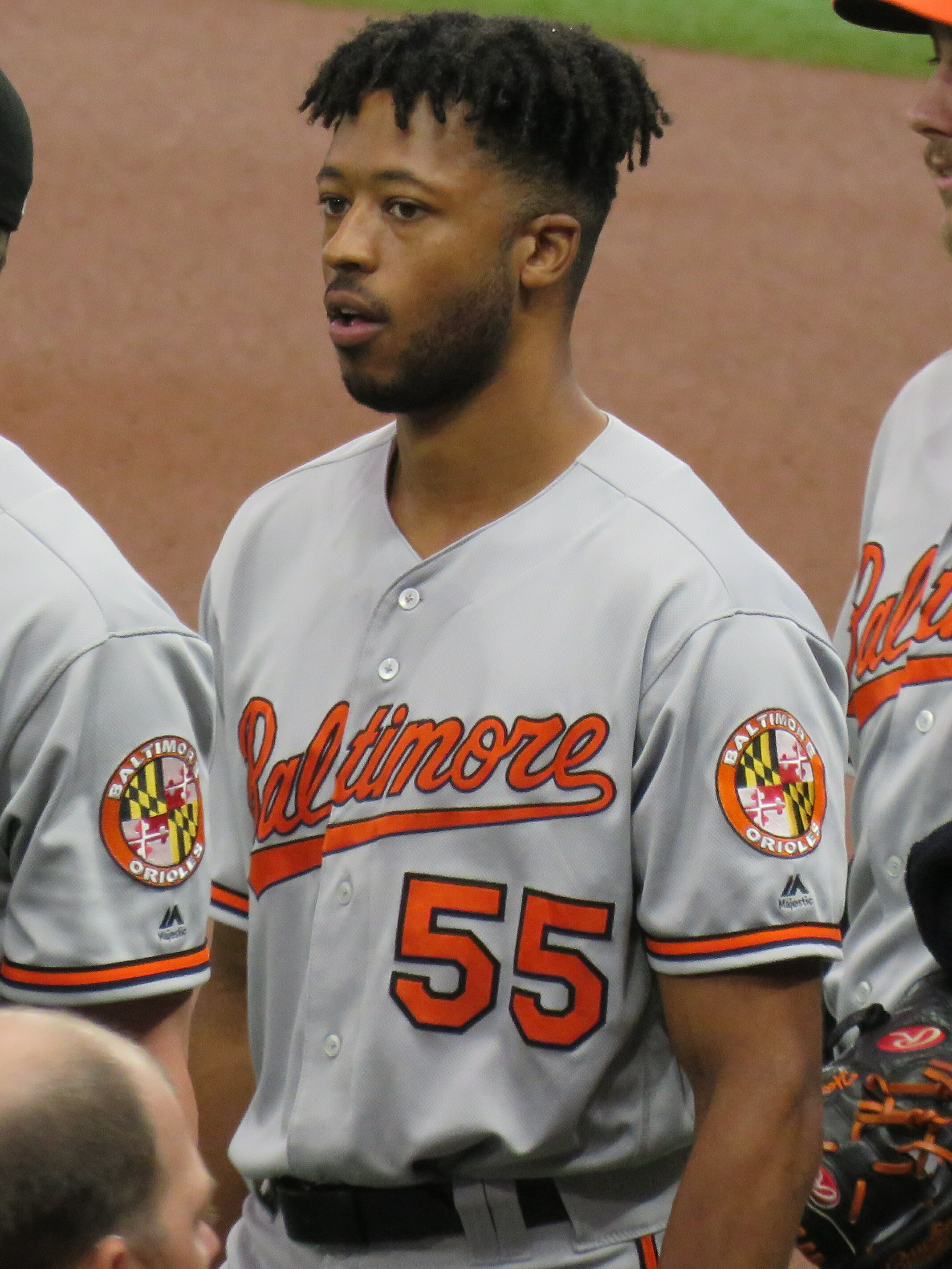
- Tate with the Baltimore Orioles in 2019

Free agent
- Pitcher
- Born: May 1, 1994 (age 32); Harbor City, California, U.S.
- Bats: Right Throws: Right

MLB debut
- July 29, 2019, for the Baltimore Orioles

MLB statistics (through 2025 season)
- Win–loss record: 7–14
- Earned run average: 4.09
- Strikeouts: 178
- Stats at Baseball Reference

Teams
- Baltimore Orioles (2019–2022, 2024); Toronto Blue Jays (2024–2025)
Medals
Men's baseball
Representing United States
Haarlem Baseball Week
Gold medal – first place	2014 Haarlem	National team

Dillon Michael Tate (born May 1, 1994) is an American professional baseball pitcher who is a free agent. He has previously played in Major League Baseball (MLB) for the Baltimore Orioles and Toronto Blue Jays. Tate played college baseball at the University of California, Santa Barbara. The Texas Rangers selected him in the first round of the 2015 MLB draft and traded him to the New York Yankees during the 2016 season. He was traded to the Orioles close to the 2018 trade deadline and made his MLB debut with them in 2019.

== Early life and education ==
Tate attended Claremont High School in Claremont, California, graduating in 2012. He made the school's baseball team, but received little playing time as a freshman. He then began to train at the Major League Baseball (MLB) Urban Youth Academy in Compton, California. He was not selected in the MLB draft out of high school.

Tate enrolled at the University of California, Santa Barbara, where he played college baseball for the UC Santa Barbara Gauchos. The Gauchos and the Oral Roberts Golden Eagles were the only two Division I programs to offer Tate a scholarship. As a freshman, he appeared in four games, pitching three innings, and had a 9.00 earned run average (ERA). That summer, he grew from 165 pounds (75 kg) to 200 pounds (91 kg) through weight training. As a sophomore, he served as the Gauchos' closer, finishing the season with a 1.45 ERA, 12 saves, and 46 strikeouts. Tate was expected to enter his junior season in 2015 as the closer again, but was converted into a starting pitcher after an injury to one of the team's starters. He started 14 games in his junior year, pitching to an 8–5 win–loss record with a 2.26 ERA and 111 strikeouts in 103 1/3 innings pitched.

== Career ==
=== Texas Rangers ===
Considered one of the top prospects for the 2015 MLB draft, the Texas Rangers selected Tate with the fourth overall selection. He signed with the Rangers on June 12, earning a $4.2 million signing bonus.

Tate made his professional debut for the Spokane Indians of the Low–A Northwest League and was promoted to the Hickory Crawdads of the Single–A South Atlantic League in 2016. He spent time on the disabled list with a strained hamstring. Tate pitched 65 innings for Hickory, with a 5.12 ERA, 55 strikeouts, and 27 walks. His fastball velocity, which previously ranged from 92–98 miles per hour (148–158 km/h), decreased to 90–93 miles per hour (145–150 km/h) in his time with Hickory.

=== New York Yankees ===
On August 1, 2016, the Rangers traded Tate and fellow prospects Erik Swanson and Nick Green to the New York Yankees in exchange for Carlos Beltrán. The Yankees assigned Tate to the Single–A Charleston RiverDogs of the South Atlantic League to pitch as a reliever for the remainder of 2016, to work with pitching coach Justin Pope to fix various mechanical flaws that can lead to an increase in velocity. In 17 1/3 innings for Charleston, he posted a 3.12 ERA with a 1.56 WHIP. The Yankees assigned him to the Scottsdale Scorpions of the Arizona Fall League after the regular season, and he was named to the Fall Stars Game.

After missing the start of the 2017 season with a sore shoulder, Tate made nine starts for the Tampa Yankees of the High–A Florida State League, pitching to a 2.62 ERA. The Yankees promoted him to the Trenton Thunder of the Double–A Eastern League in August, where he finished the season, posting a 1–2 record with a 3.24 ERA in 25 innings.

=== Baltimore Orioles ===
On July 24, 2018, the New York Yankees traded Tate, Cody Carroll, and Josh Rogers to the Baltimore Orioles in exchange for Zack Britton. On November 20, the Orioles added Tate to their 40-man roster to protect him from the Rule 5 draft. Tate split the 2018 season between the Double-A Trenton Thunder and the Double–A Bowie Baysox of the Eastern League, accumulating a 7–5 record with a 4.16 ERA in 123 1/3 innings. Tate returned to Bowie to start the 2019 season.

On July 26, 2019, the Orioles promoted Tate to the major leagues. He made his debut on July 29, allowing three runs over two innings pitched. He finished his rookie season with a 6.43 ERA across 16 appearances. Tate pitched in 12 games for Baltimore in 2020, posting a 3.24 ERA with 14 strikeouts.

In 2021, Tate appeared in 62 games for the Orioles, registering an 0-6 record and 4.39 ERA with 49 strikeouts in 67 2/3 innings of work. Tate enjoyed a career year in 2022, appearing in 67 games for Baltimore and posting a 4-4 record and 3.05 ERA with 60 strikeouts and 5 saves in 73 2/3 innings pitched.

On January 13, 2023, Tate agreed to a one-year, $1.5 million contract with the Orioles, avoiding salary arbitration. On February 16, it was announced that Tate had suffered a flexor strain in late November and would miss the first month of the season as a result.

Tate made 29 appearances for Baltimore in 2024, recording a 4.59 ERA with 23 strikeouts across 33 1/3 innings pitched. Tate was designated for assignment following the acquisition of Forrest Wall on August 28, 2024.

=== Toronto Blue Jays ===
On September 1, 2024, Tate was claimed off waivers by the Toronto Blue Jays. In 4 games for Toronto, he logged a 5.40 ERA with 4 strikeouts across 3 1/3 innings pitched. On November 22, the Blue Jays non–tendered Tate, making him a free agent.

On March 12, 2025, Tate re-signed with the Blue Jays on a one-year, $1.4 million contract. He was optioned to the Triple-A Buffalo Bisons to begin the season. In five appearances for Toronto, Tate recorded a 5.06 ERA with seven strikeouts across 5 1/3 innings pitched. He was designated for assignment by the Blue Jays on May 9. Tate cleared waivers and was sent outright to Buffalo on May 12. On September 1, the Blue Jays added Tate back to their active roster. On November 6, Tate was removed from the 40-man roster and sent outright to Buffalo, but he rejected the assignment and elected free agency.

=== Los Angeles Angels ===
On June 25, 2026, Tate signed a minor league contract with the Los Angeles Angels. In 23 games with Triple-A Salt Lake Bees he threw 31 innings of relief going 5-4 with a 3.19 ERA and 25 strikeouts. He elected free agency on November 2.

Tate was signed by the Navegantes del Magallanes for the 2026–27 Venezuelan Winter League season.
