= David Hess (baseball) =

American baseball player (born 1993)

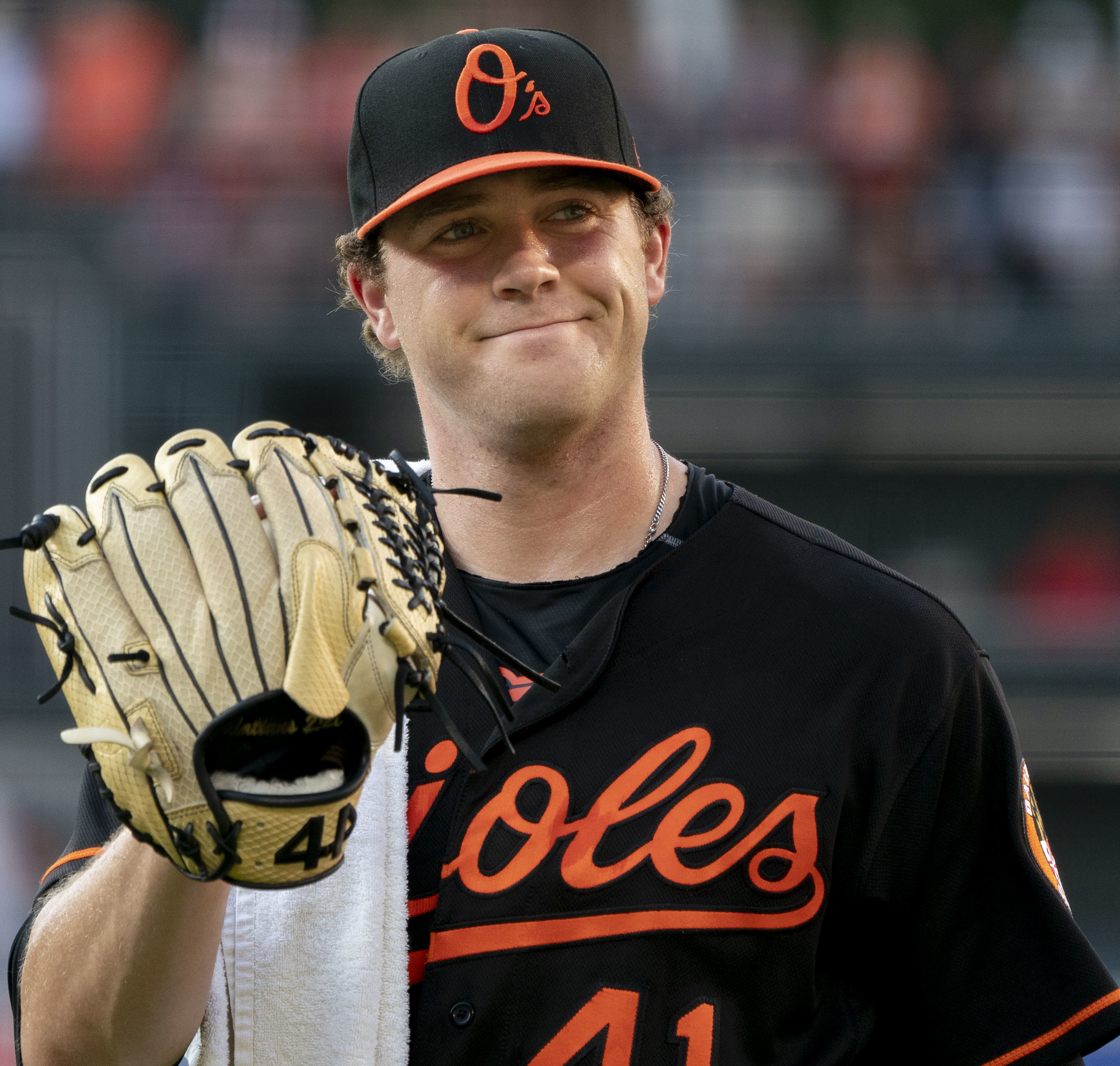
- Hess with the Baltimore Orioles

Free agent
- Pitcher
- Born: July 10, 1993 (age 33); Pembroke Pines, Florida, U.S.
- Bats: Right Throws: Right

MLB debut
- May 12, 2018, for the Baltimore Orioles

MLB statistics (through 2021 season)
- Win–loss record: 6–22
- Earned run average: 6.25
- Strikeouts: 161
- Stats at Baseball Reference

Teams
- Baltimore Orioles (2018–2020); Miami Marlins (2021); Tampa Bay Rays (2021)

David James Hess (born July 10, 1993) is an American professional baseball pitcher who is a free agent. He has previously played in Major League Baseball (MLB) for the Baltimore Orioles, Miami Marlins, and Tampa Bay Rays.

== Amateur career ==
Hess played baseball at Tullahoma High School in Tullahoma, Tennessee. As a senior, he had a 8–1 win–loss record with a 1.91 earned run average (ERA) along with batting .393 with eight home runs. After high school, he enrolled at Tennessee Technological University and played college baseball for the Tennessee Tech Golden Eagles. In 2014, his junior year, he pitched to a 9-3 record with a 3.24 ERA in 16 starts.

== Professional career ==
=== Baltimore Orioles ===
After the season, Hess was drafted by the Baltimore Orioles in the fifth round of the 2014 Major League Baseball draft. He made his professional debut with the Aberdeen IronBirds and also spent time with the Delmarva Shorebirds; in ten total games between the two teams, he pitched to a 2–1 record and 3.24 ERA. He started 2015 with the Frederick Keys and was promoted to Bowie Baysox during the season. In 28 games (27 starts) between both clubs, he posted a 10–5 record and a 3.64 ERA. He returned to Bowie in 2016, going 5–13 with a 5.37 ERA in 25 games (24 starts). In 2017, he once again returned to Bowie, pitching to an 11–9 record with a 3.85 ERA with 123 strikeouts in a career high 154.1 innings pitched. The Orioles added Hess to their 40-man roster after the 2017 season.

Hess made his major league debut on May 12, 2018 against the Tampa Bay Rays at Oriole Park at Camden Yards. He pitched six innings, giving up three earned runs on six hits, three strikeouts, and zero walks. He remained in the Orioles rotation, totaling 21 appearances, 19 of them starts. He went 3-10 in 103 1/3 innings.

In his first start of the 2019 season in a 6–5 win over the Toronto Blue Jays at Rogers Centre on April 1, Hess had a no-hit bid through 6 1/3 innings before being removed by manager Brandon Hyde in favor of Pedro Araújo. With his record at 1–10 by the end of the campaign, he and Gabriel Ynoa became the first pair of teammates with double-digit losses and no more than one win since Jack Nabors and Tom Sheehan of the 1916 Philadelphia Athletics.

Hess only appeared in 3 games for the Orioles in 2020, and gave up 5 runs over 7 innings pitched. On October 29, 2020, Hess was removed from the 40–man roster and sent outright to the Triple–A Norfolk Tides. He elected free agency on November 2.

=== Tampa Bay Rays ===
On December 3, 2020, Hess signed a minor league contract with the Tampa Bay Rays organization. Hess posted a 2.81 ERA through 13 appearances with the Triple-A Durham Bulls.

=== Miami Marlins ===
On July 3, 2021, the Rays traded Hess to the Miami Marlins in exchange for Justin Sterner and cash considerations. The Marlins selected Hess' contract to the active roster following his acquisition. On August 14, 2021, Hess was designated for assignment by the Marlins. On August 18, Hess rejected his outright assignment and elected free agency.

=== Tampa Bay Rays (second stint) ===
On August 19, 2021, Hess signed a minor league deal to return to the Tampa Bay Rays and was assigned to Triple-A Durham. On August 21, the Rays selected Hess' contract. The following day, Hess was designated for assignment without appearing in a game. On August 24, Hess cleared waivers and was assigned outright back to Triple-A Durham. Hess's contract was selected on September 6. Hess made 1 appearance for the Rays, recording a 27.00 ERA with 2 strikeouts before he was designated for assignment on September 8. On October 14, Hess elected free agency, before re-signing with the Rays on a minor league deal on November 11.

Hess made eight appearances split between Durham and the rookie-level Florida Complex League Rays, registering a combined 2-1 record and 13.06 ERA with 11 strikeouts across 10 1/3 innings pitched. Hess was released by the Rays organization on July 11, 2022.

=== High Point Rockers ===
On July 10, 2025, after three years of inactivity, Hess signed with the High Point Rockers of the Atlantic League of Professional Baseball. He made 15 relief appearances for High Point, compiling a 2-0 record and 1.82 ERA with 29 strikeouts and one save across 29 2/3 innings pitched.

On March 29, 2026, Hess re-signed with the Rockers. In 19 games (16 starts) he threw 88.1 innings going 6-4 with a 5.50 ERA and 71 strikeouts. He was released on August 18.

== Personal life ==
Hess is a Christian. Hess and his wife, Devin, married in 2016. On October 13, 2021, Hess announced via Twitter that he will undergo chemotherapy after doctors discovered a cancerous germ cell tumor in his chest. On January 28, 2022, Hess was 'cured' and cleared for baseball activities. However, on May 27, 2023, Hess announced that his cancer had returned and that he would begin chemotherapy again.
