= Cody Carroll =

American baseball player (born 1992)

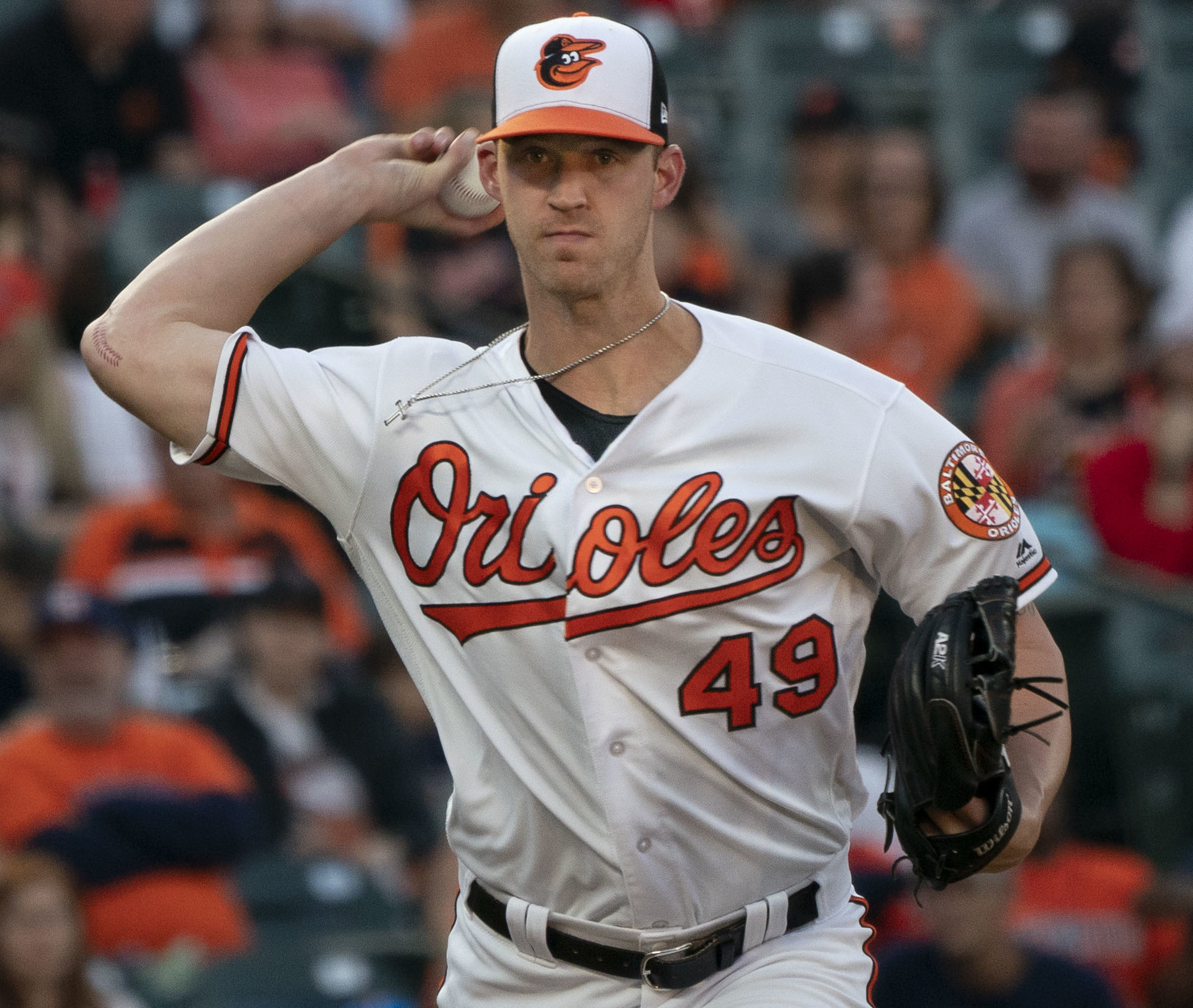
- Carroll with the Baltimore Orioles
- Pitcher
- Born: October 15, 1992 (age 33); Mount Juliet, Tennessee, U.S.
- Batted: Right Threw: Right

MLB debut
- August 1, 2018, for the Baltimore Orioles

Last MLB appearance
- August 14, 2020, for the Baltimore Orioles

MLB statistics
- Win–loss record: 0–2
- Earned run average: 13.74
- Strikeouts: 19
- Stats at Baseball Reference

Teams
- Baltimore Orioles (2018, 2020)

Cody Mark Carroll (born October 15, 1992) is an American former professional baseball pitcher. He played in Major League Baseball (MLB) for the Baltimore Orioles.

== Career ==
=== Amateur career ===
Carroll attended Mount Juliet High School in Mount Juliet, Tennessee. He played college baseball at the University of Southern Mississippi. He majored in liberal studies.

=== New York Yankees ===
The New York Yankees selected Carroll in the 22nd round of the 2015 Major League Baseball draft. He made his professional debut in 2015 with the Pulaski Yankees and spent the whole season there, pitching to a 1–1 record and 1.75 ERA in 25 2/3 innings pitched.

Carroll pitched in 2016 with the Charleston RiverDogs, going 4–4 with a 3.15 ERA in 91 1/3 innings, and in 2017 with both the Tampa Yankees and Trenton Thunder, posting a combined 3–5 record and 2.54 ERA with 89 strikeouts in 67 1/3 total innings pitched between the two teams. After the 2017 season, he played in the Arizona Fall League.

=== Baltimore Orioles ===
On July 24, 2018, the Yankees traded Carroll, Dillon Tate, and Josh Rogers to the Baltimore Orioles for Zack Britton. Carroll was promoted to the majors for the first time on July 31, 2018. He made his debut the next day.

Carroll was out for most of the 2019 season with a back injury. In 2020 he broke camp with the Orioles after the resumption of play in July. He made two appearances before being sent to the teams alternate camp; he was recalled as an extra man on August 14 and returned the next day. On September 21, 2020, Carroll was outrighted off of the 40-man roster.

In 2021, Carroll made 22 appearances for the Triple-A Norfolk Tides. He had a 5.57 ERA with 23 strikeouts. On August 2, 2021, Carroll was released by the Orioles.

=== Miami Marlins ===
On August 24, 2021, Carroll signed a minor league contract with the Miami Marlins. Carroll made 3 appearances for the Triple-A Jacksonville Jumbo Shrimp, posting a 6.00 ERA and 6 strikeouts. He became a free agent following the season.

=== San Francisco Giants ===
On February 10, 2022, Carroll signed a minor league contract with the San Francisco Giants. In 31 games for the Triple–A Sacramento River Cats, he struggled to a 7.62 ERA with 49 strikeouts across 39.0 innings of work. Carroll was released by the Giants organization on August 23.

Carroll retired from professional baseball following the 2022 season and became an independent contractor.
