= Sam Gaviglio =

American baseball pitcher (born 1990)

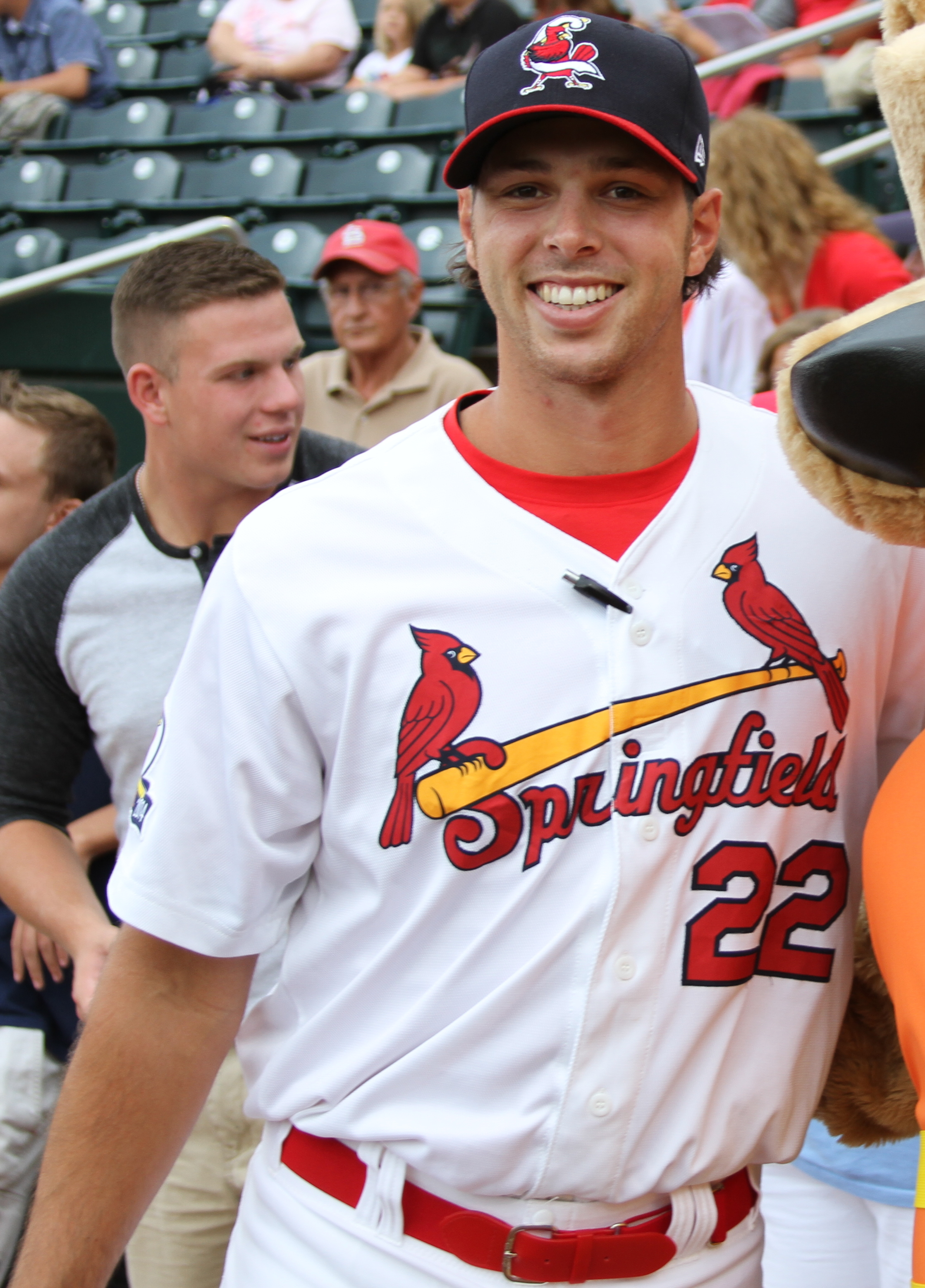
- Gaviglio with the Springfield Cardinals in 2014
- Pitcher
- Born: May 22, 1990 (age 36); Ashland, Oregon, U.S.
- Batted: Right Threw: Right

Professional debut
- MLB: May 11, 2017, for the Seattle Mariners
- KBO: July 2, 2021, for the SSG Landers

Last appearance
- MLB: August 25, 2020, for the Toronto Blue Jays
- KBO: October 28, 2021, for the SSG Landers

MLB statistics
- Win–loss record: 11–18
- Earned run average: 4.91
- Strikeouts: 243

KBO statistics
- Win–loss record: 6–4
- Earned run average: 5.86
- Strikeouts: 70
- Stats at Baseball Reference

Teams
- Seattle Mariners (2017); Kansas City Royals (2017); Toronto Blue Jays (2018–2020); SSG Landers (2021)

Samuel Joseph Gaviglio (born May 22, 1990) is an American former professional baseball pitcher. He has previously played in Major League Baseball (MLB) for the Seattle Mariners, Kansas City Royals, and Toronto Blue Jays, and in the KBO League for the SSG Landers. Prior to playing professionally, he played college baseball for the Oregon State Beavers. He has played for the Italy national baseball team.

== Amateur career ==
Gaviglio attended Ashland High School in Ashland, Oregon, graduating in 2008. He starred for his school's baseball team in his senior year; Gaviglio pitched to a 13–0 win–loss record with an earned run average (ERA) of approximately 0.50. He led Ashland the Oregon state championship and was named the Class 5A Pitcher of the Year. The Tampa Bay Rays selected Gaviglio in the 40th round of the 2008 MLB draft, but he did not sign.

Gaviglio enrolled at Oregon State University to play college baseball for the Beavers. As a freshman, Gaviglio pitched to a 10–1 record and a 2.73 ERA. He was named a Freshman All-American. His sophomore year was hampered by an injured hamstring. He had a 3–4 record, 2 saves, and 5.60 ERA. He began his junior season with a streak of 41 2/3 scoreless innings pitched. He ended the season with a 12–2 record and a 1.87 ERA. Gaviglio was named to the All-Pacific-10 Conference's first team, Louisville Slugger named him a second-team All-American, and he was named a semi-finalist for the Golden Spikes Award.

== Professional career ==
=== St. Louis Cardinals ===
The St. Louis Cardinals selected Gaviglio in the fifth round, with the 170th overall selection, of the 2011 MLB draft. He signed with the Cardinals, receiving a $175,000 signing bonus, rather than return to Oregon State for his senior year. He made his professional debut with the Batavia Muckdogs of the Class A-Short Season New York–Penn League. In 2013, Gaviglio pitched for the Palm Beach Cardinals of the Class A-Advanced Florida State League, and had a 4–1 win–loss record and a 2.72 ERA in 39 2/3 innings pitched. He missed 3 1/2 months of the 2013 season recovering from a right forearm strain. After the season, the Cardinals assigned him to the Salt River Rafters of the Arizona Fall League.

In 2014, the Cardinals invited Gaviglio to spring training as a non-roster player. Gaviglio pitched for the Double-A Springfield Cardinals, completing the season with a 5–12 win–loss record and a 4.28 ERA in 136 2/3 innings pitched. While his season began with a 5.42 ERA in his first 14 games started, he finished the season with a 2.90 ERA in his final 11 games.

=== Seattle Mariners ===
On November 20, 2014, the Cardinals traded Gaviglio to the Seattle Mariners for infielder Ty Kelly. In 2015, he advanced to Triple-A, playing for the Tacoma Rainiers. He split the 2016 season between Tacoma and the Double-A Jackson Generals. On May 11, 2017, he made his major league debut for the Mariners against the Toronto Blue Jays at Rogers Centre, allowing one run in two innings in relief. He started his next five games with good results, going 2–1 with a 2.67 ERA. He fared worse in his final six starts with Seattle, going 1–4 with a 6.27 ERA. He lost his spot in the starting rotation and was sent down to Tacoma on July 20. He returned to the Mariners for four days in August but did not pitch for the team.

=== Kansas City Royals ===
On September 1, Gaviglio was claimed off waivers by the Kansas City Royals. He was added to the active roster for the rest of the season and pitched at a 3.00 ERA over 12 innings. He was designated for assignment on March 18, 2018.

=== Toronto Blue Jays ===
On March 21, 2018, Gaviglio was traded to the Toronto Blue Jays for cash. He was recalled by the Blue Jays on May 11. Gaviglio spent most of the season in the Blue Jays rotation, finishing with a 3–10 record over 24 starts and 2 relief appearances. He struck out 105 batters in 123 2/3 innings. In 2019, he had a 4–2 record and 4.61 ERA as a reliever. He was limited to 4 games in the shortened 2020 season, allowing 3 runs in three innings.

Gaviglio was designated for assignment on September 1, 2020, and released on September 4.

=== Texas Rangers ===
On January 30, 2021, Gaviglio signed a minor league contract with the Texas Rangers and was invited to spring training. In 5 games for the Triple-A Round Rock Express, he recorded a 2–1 record and 5.13 ERA.

=== SSG Landers ===
On June 4, 2021, Gaviglio’s contract was sold to the SSG Landers of the KBO League. He made his KBO debut on July 2 against the Lotte Giants, pitching 5 2/3 innings of 4-run ball with 2 strikeouts. Over the season, Gaviglio made 15 starts for SSG, going 6–4 with a 5.86 ERA and 70 strikeouts in 81 1/3 innings.

=== Los Angeles Dodgers ===
On January 28, 2022, Gaviglio signed a minor league contract with the Los Angeles Dodgers. He pitched in 17 games for the Triple-A Oklahoma City Dodgers, starting 9 games, with a 6–4 record and 6.35 ERA. He was placed on the injured list on July 23 and remained there the rest of the season. He elected free agency following the season on November 10.

=== Gastonia Honey Hunters ===
On June 20, 2023, Gaviglio signed with the Gastonia Honey Hunters of the Atlantic League of Professional Baseball. In 5 starts for Gastonia, he struggled to a 9.45 ERA with 9 strikeouts in 20 innings pitched. On July 18, Gastonia released Gaviglio.

== Personal life ==
Gaviglio's wife, Alaina Findlay, is also from Ashland. They have two daughters, Livia, born in 2018, and Gianna, born in 2020.

Gaviglio's brother, Gus, also starred for Ashland's baseball team. Their parents are Nancy and Jack Gaviglio. They are distantly related to former MLB player and manager Ralph Houk.

In high school, Gaviglio was a safety on the football team, earning all-conference honors his senior season.
