= Josh Rogers =

American baseball player (born 1994)

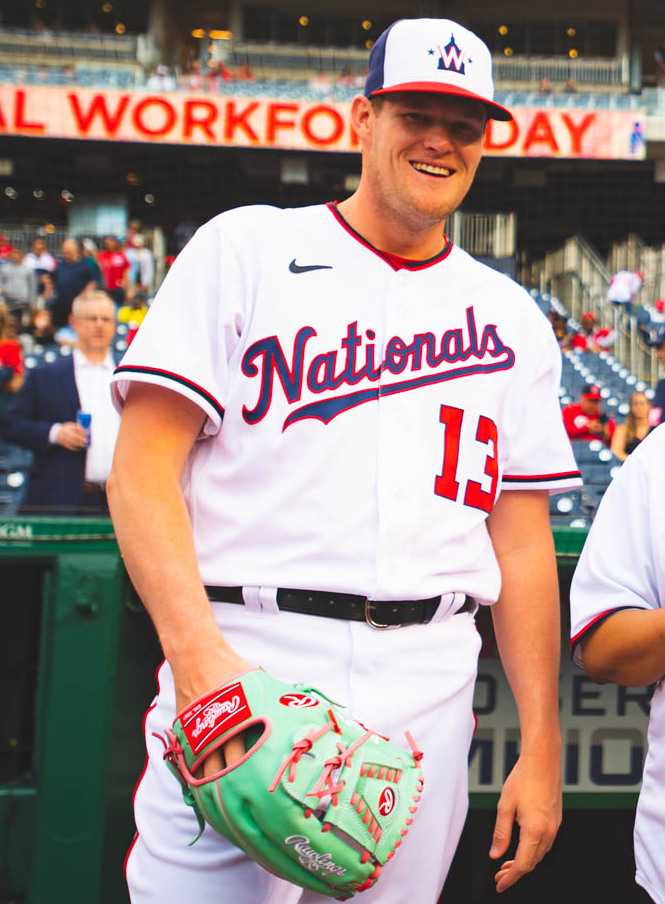
- Rogers with the Washington Nationals in 2022
- Pitcher
- Born: July 10, 1994 (age 32); New Albany, Indiana, U.S.
- Batted: Left Threw: Left

MLB debut
- August 28, 2018, for the Baltimore Orioles

Last MLB appearance
- August 11, 2024, for the Colorado Rockies

MLB statistics
- Win–loss record: 7–7
- Earned run average: 5.55
- Strikeouts: 48
- Stats at Baseball Reference

Teams
- Baltimore Orioles (2018–2019); Washington Nationals (2021–2022); Colorado Rockies (2024)

Joshua Cole Rogers (born July 10, 1994) is an American former professional baseball pitcher. He played in Major League Baseball (MLB) for the Baltimore Orioles, Washington Nationals, and Colorado Rockies.

== Career ==
=== Amateur ===
Rogers attended New Albany High School in New Albany, Indiana and played college baseball at the University of Louisville. In 2014 and 2015, he played collegiate summer baseball with the Bourne Braves of the Cape Cod Baseball League.

=== New York Yankees ===
He was drafted by the New York Yankees in the 11th round of the 2015 Major League Baseball draft.

Rogers made his professional debut with the Staten Island Yankees and was promoted to the Charleston RiverDogs after three games. In 13.1 innings pitched between both teams, he posted a 4.05 ERA. He pitched 2016 with Charleston and the Tampa Yankees, posting a combined 12–6 record and 2.38 ERA in 24 games started between the two clubs, and 2017 with both Tampa and the Trenton Thunder, pitching to a combined 8–5 record and 3.24 ERA between both teams. He began 2018 with the Scranton/Wilkes-Barre RailRiders of the Triple–A International League.

=== Baltimore Orioles ===
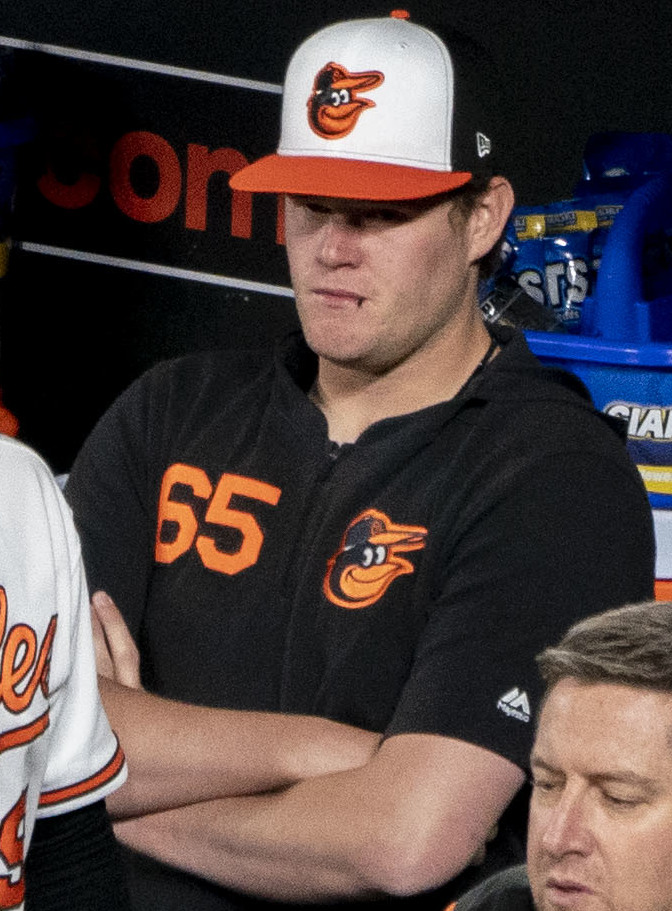
Rogers with the Baltimore Orioles in 2019

On July 24, 2018, the Yankees traded Rogers, Dillon Tate, and Cody Carroll to the Baltimore Orioles for Zach Britton. The Orioles assigned him to the Norfolk Tides of the Triple–A International League. In 24 starts between Scranton/Wilkes-Barre and Norfolk, he was 8–9 with a 3.54 ERA.

Baltimore promoted Rogers to the major leagues on August 28, 2018, and he made his major league debut that same night. He made three starts for the Orioles, going 1–2 with an 8.49 ERA. On July 3, 2019, Rogers underwent Tommy John surgery. He was outrighted off the Orioles roster on October 30, 2019. Rogers did not play in a game in 2020 due to the cancellation of the minor league season because of the COVID-19 pandemic.

In 2021, Rogers went 0–3 with a 7.79 ERA in 4 appearances for the Triple-A Norfolk Tides before he was released by the Orioles organization on May 31, 2021.

=== Washington Nationals ===
On June 4, 2021, Rogers signed a minor league contract with the Washington Nationals organization. The Nationals selected Rogers' contract on September 4, 2021, calling him up as the 29th man in a doubleheader against the New York Mets. He made his debut the same day and pitched 5.2 innings allowing 3 runs on 4 hits with 5 strikeouts. He was designated for assignment on August 2, 2022. He elected free agency on August 5.

=== Miami Marlins ===
On August 10, 2022, Rogers signed a minor league deal with the Miami Marlins. In 9 starts for the Triple–A Jacksonville Jumbo Shrimp, he logged a 4–4 record and 4.75 ERA with 32 strikeouts in 47 1/3 innings pitched. Rogers elected free agency following the season on November 10.

=== Colorado Rockies ===
On January 10, 2023, Rogers signed a minor league deal with the Colorado Rockies. In 30 games (13 starts) for the Triple–A Albuquerque Isotopes, he struggled to an 8–8 record and 8.02 ERA with 64 strikeouts across 104 1/3 innings pitched. Rogers elected free agency following the season on November 6.

On January 25, 2024, Rogers re–signed with the Rockies on a new minor league contract. In 9 starts for Triple–A Albuquerque, he compiled a 5.44 ERA with 30 strikeouts across 46 1/3 innings. On May 27, the Rockies selected Rogers' contract, adding him to their major league roster. In 5 games for Colorado, he struggled to a 6.75 ERA with 2 strikeouts across 9 1/3 innings. Rogers was designated for assignment by the Rockies on July 15. He cleared waivers and was sent outright to Albuquerque on July 17. On August 11, the Rockies selected Rogers' contract and added him back to their active roster. He allowed one run in 1 2/3 innings of relief against the Atlanta Braves that day. On August 14, Rogers was removed from the 40–man roster and sent outright to Albuquerque. He elected free agency on October 4.
