= Zack Britton =

American baseball player (born 1987)

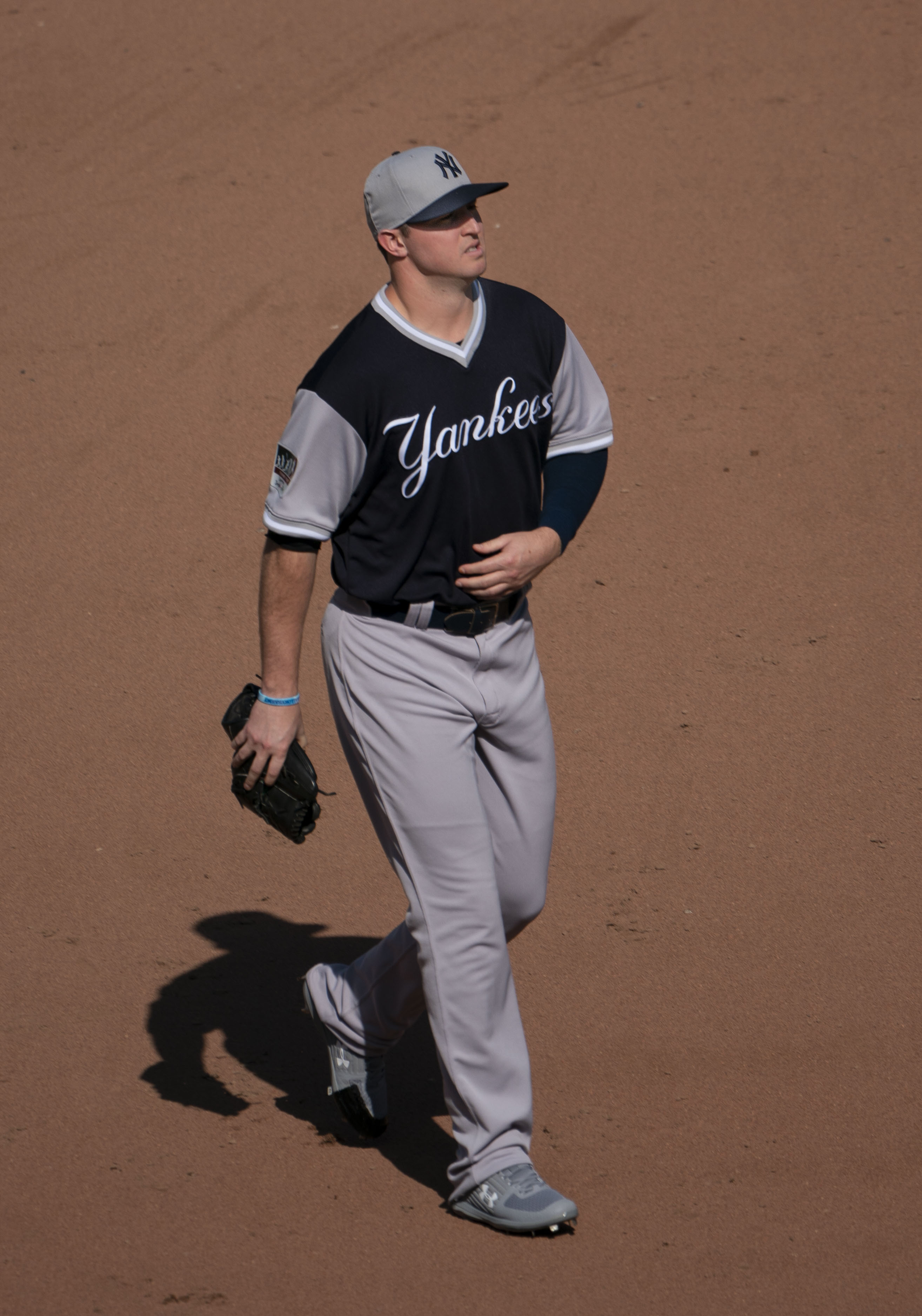
- Britton with the New York Yankees in 2018
- Pitcher
- Born: December 22, 1987 (age 38); Panorama City, California, U.S.
- Batted: Left Threw: Left

MLB debut
- April 3, 2011, for the Baltimore Orioles

Last appearance
- September 30, 2022, for the New York Yankees

MLB statistics
- Win–loss record: 35–26
- Earned run average: 3.13
- Strikeouts: 532
- Saves: 154
- Stats at Baseball Reference

Teams
- Baltimore Orioles (2011–2018); New York Yankees (2018–2022)

Career highlights and awards
- 2× All-Star (2015, 2016); AL Reliever of the Year (2016); AL saves leader (2016)

Zackary Grant Britton (born December 22, 1987), known professionally as Zach Britton until February 2019, is an American former professional baseball pitcher. He played in Major League Baseball (MLB) for the Baltimore Orioles and New York Yankees.

Britton graduated from Weatherford High School in Texas and was drafted by the Baltimore Orioles in the third round of the 2006 MLB draft. Initially a starting pitcher, Britton converted to a closer and led the American League in saves in 2016 and was named to the AL All-Star team in 2015 and 2016. From September 20, 2015, to August 23, 2017, Britton converted 60 straight saves, an American League record. The Orioles traded Britton to New York during the 2018 season.

== Early years ==
Britton, the youngest of three brothers, was raised in Santa Clarita, California. His grandmother on his maternal side is of Dominican origin, but he does not speak Spanish. His father, Greg, is of German-Irish descent.

Britton attended Canyon High School for his freshman year. During baseball practice with the freshman team, he sustained fractures of the skull and clavicle and bleeding in the brain as a result of diving headfirst into concrete while attempting to catch a foul popup. He spent two days in intensive care.

Britton's family moved to Texas, and Britton transferred to Weatherford High School. He was an all-state outfielder for the baseball team and also pitched. Britton was offered an athletic scholarship to attend Texas A&M University.

== Professional career ==
=== Baltimore Orioles ===
The Baltimore Orioles selected Britton in the third round, with the 85th overall pick, of the 2006 Major League Baseball draft. He accepted a $435,000 signing bonus to sign a professional contract and not attend college.

Before the 2010 season, Britton was named the Orioles' third-best prospect according to Baseball America. In a midseason top 25 prospect list, he was ranked the 10th-best prospect in all of baseball. Prior to 2011, Baseball America had him ranked second among Orioles prospects.

==== 2011 ====
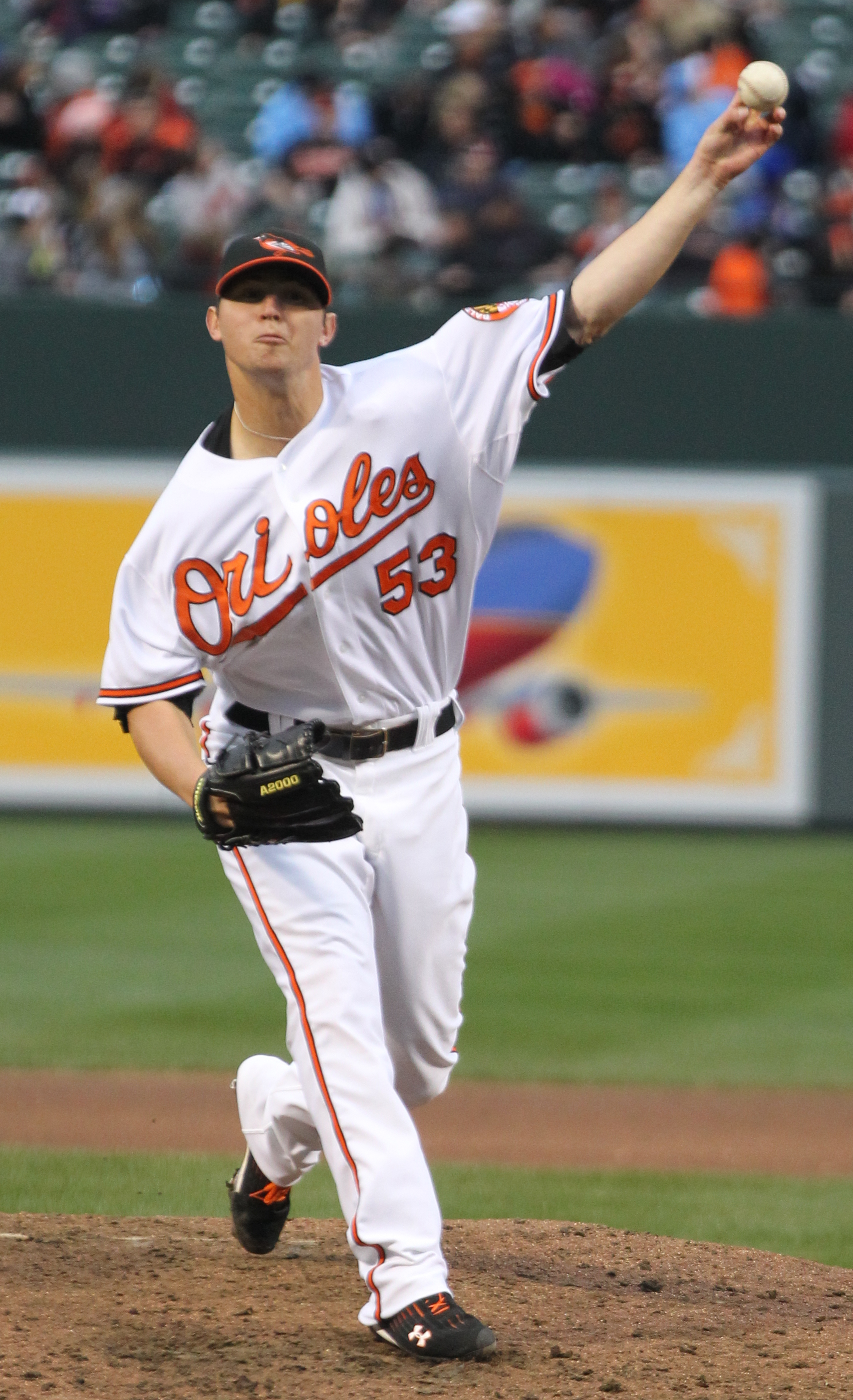
Britton with the Orioles in 2011

Even though Britton was statistically the Orioles' best pitcher during spring training, he started the 2011 campaign in the minors, being optioned to the Norfolk Tides on March 29. Britton was recalled five days later on April 3, however, to replace the injured Brian Matusz in the starting rotation. Britton capped a season-opening three-game sweep of the Tampa Bay Rays by winning his MLB debut that same day in a 5–1 victory at Tropicana Field. He allowed a run and three hits in six innings.

Britton showcased his batting prowess during his first experience with interleague play. His five hits in eight at-bats were the most by any American League (AL) pitcher in 2011. His first major league hit and run batted in (RBI) came on a double off Jason Marquis in the fourth inning of an 8–4 defeat to the Washington Nationals at Nationals Park on June 17. He hit his first big league home run off Brandon Beachy in the third inning of a 5–4 victory over the Atlanta Braves at Turner Field on July 3.

Britton was unexpectedly sent to the Bowie Baysox on July 9. After a 5–1 start, he had lost six of his next seven decisions. There was speculation that the Orioles made the move to prevent him from getting a full year of major league service time and thus delaying his eligibility for free agency by a season.

Britton finished his rookie campaign, appearing in 28 games (all starts), pitching to a 4.61 ERA, 1.45 WHIP and an 11–11 record.

==== 2012 ====
On March 26, 2012, Britton was placed on the 15-day disabled list due to a left shoulder impingement. He was then transferred retroactively to the 60-day disabled list on June 3, but was reinstated on June 6 to begin his minor league rehab assignment with the Tides. He made his 2012 debut on July 17.

In his second season, Britton pitched to a disappointing 5.07 ERA in 12 games (11 starts), compiling a 5–3 record.

==== 2013 ====
The Orioles optioned Britton to their Triple-A affiliate Norfolk Tides on March 23 to start the 2013 season. He was recalled on April 25. He pitched in only eight games for the Orioles, making seven starts with a 2–3 record in 40 innings of work. Britton made his final start on September 4, before being moved to the bullpen.

==== 2014 ====
Britton made the opening day roster for the 2014 Orioles season and picked up his first win of the year pitching in relief against the Red Sox on March 31. On May 15, Britton earned his first career save, against the Kansas City Royals, pitching a perfect 9th inning. Britton would assume the role of Orioles' closer for the rest of the season, converting 37 of the 41 save opportunities presented to him, finishing the regular season with a 1.65 ERA. The Orioles would sweep the Detroit Tigers in the 2014 American League Division Series, with Britton earning a pair of saves, in games 2 and 3.

==== 2015 ====
On February 4, 2015, Britton agreed to $3.2 million deal and avoided an arbitration hearing. Britton was selected to his first career MLB All-Star Game after going 1–0 with 23 saves in 24 attempts and a 1.72 ERA in the first half. Britton pitched two-thirds scoreless innings in the game and he also struck out one batter. He finished the year with a record of 4–1, converting 36 of 40 saves while posting a 1.92 ERA. He was tied for 3rd in the American League for Saves.

==== 2016 ====
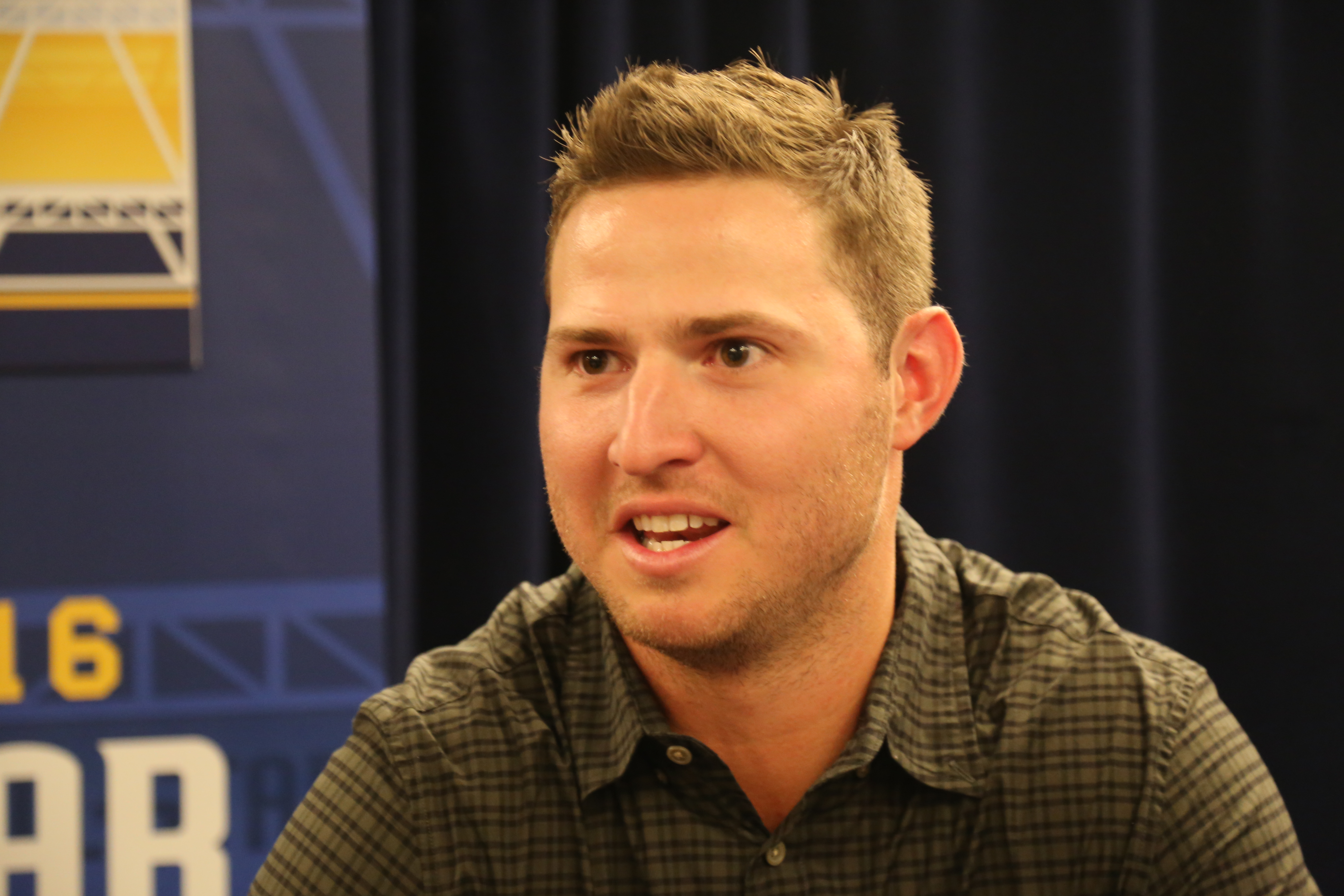
Britton at the 2016 MLB All-Star Game

Britton signed a one-year, $6.75 million contract with the O's on February 5 to avoid arbitration. On June 9, Britton converted his 19th consecutive save to start the season, setting a new Orioles franchise record. Britton extended his streak to 29 games to close out the first half of the 2016 season after converting 27 consecutive saves before the All-Star break. Selected to the All-Star team for his second straight year, Britton pitched to a 2–1 record with a 0.72 ERA and 43 strikeouts in 37 2/3 innings.

Britton's 33rd consecutive save to start the season on August 3 set an MLB record for most consecutive saves to start a season by a left handed pitcher and the seventh longest of all-time to start a season. On August 11, Britton set the MLB record for most consecutive relief appearances without allowing an earned run, which was thirty-nine up to that point. In doing so, he lowered his season ERA to 0.56 and converted his 35th save in 35 attempts on the year. On August 22, Britton converted his 38th save of the season in 38 attempts, setting a career-high in saves. He also appeared in his 43rd straight game without allowing an earned run, the longest such streak since earned runs became a stat in 1913. On August 24, Britton allowed his first earned run in 44 appearances in a 10–8 win over the Washington Nationals, ending his MLB-record streak.

Britton pitched in 69 games, throwing 67 innings while allowing only four earned runs for a 0.54 ERA. This broke the MLB record for lowest single-season ERA by a pitcher with at least 50 innings pitched. He finished with 74 strikeouts and just an 0.84 WHIP, going 2–1, allowing only one home run and saving all 47 save opportunities he faced. From the beginning of May to the end of the regular season, Britton pitched to an 0.16 ERA, holding hitters to a .160/.222/.195 slash. Britton led the American League in saves (47), games finished (63) and win probability added (6.5). Britton posted a ground ball percentage of 75.8%, leading all MLB relievers and setting what was at the time the highest single-season ground ball rate ever recorded for a pitcher with at least 50 innings pitched. Britton was not used in a tied 2–2 game in the 11th inning of the American League Wild Card game against the Toronto Blue Jays, which resulted in teammate Ubaldo Jiménez allowing a walk off three-run home run to Edwin Encarnación. The Orioles lost the game by a final of 5–2.

Britton won the Mariano Rivera Award. He placed fourth in the AL Cy Young Award balloting behind winner Rick Porcello, Justin Verlander, and Corey Kluber, receiving five first place votes, while also finishing 11th on the MVP ballot.

==== 2017 ====
Britton earned his first save of the season in a 3-1 Orioles victory over the Toronto Blue Jays during the second game of the season. It was his 50th consecutive converted save dating back to October 1, 2015. He also became just the fifth pitcher in MLB history to convert at least 50 consecutive save opportunities. Two days later, Britton shut the door on the Yankees to seal a 6–5 victory, helping the Orioles advance to 3–0 on the year. He tied José Valverde for fourth-most consecutive save opportunities converted with 51. He also tied former Orioles closer Jim Johnson for second most career saves in franchise history, with 122. The very next night, Britton converted his third save of the season and 52nd in a row, tying him for third most all-time with Jeurys Familia. He also took sole possession of 2nd on the Orioles all-time list with his 123rd. Britton earned his fourth save of the season against the Blue Jays on April 13. The save was also his 53rd consecutive converted save, which moved him into sole possession of third place on the all-time list of consecutive saves. Britton moved into a tie for second most consecutive saves the very next night after converting his 54th save in a row. On April 16, Britton was placed on the 10-day disabled list due to left forearm tightness. He was activated on May 2, but on May 6, Britton was again placed on the 10-day disabled list due to the same forearm problem. Britton was activated in early July, before the All-Star break. On July 23, he converted his first save since April. The save was his 55th straight, a new American League record. He also moved into sole possession of 2nd place for most consecutive saves converted. On August 23, Britton's streak ended after he gave up two runs in the ninth inning to the Athletics, allowing them to tie the score. His streak ended at 60, having lasted for 704 days.

He finished 2017 by making 38 appearances out of the bullpen with a 2–1 record, a 2.89 ERA, and 15 saves. He threw a sinker 87.5% of the time, tops in MLB. On December 20, it was revealed that Britton suffered a ruptured Achilles tendon, ruling him out for six months.

==== 2018 ====
Britton agreed to a $12 million, one-year deal with the Orioles in January 2018. He was placed on the 60-day disabled list to begin the season as he recuperated from the ruptured Achilles tendon injury he suffered in December. He made his 2018 debut on June 12, and recorded his first save on June 23.

=== New York Yankees ===
On July 24, 2018, the Orioles traded Britton to the New York Yankees in exchange for Dillon Tate, Cody Carroll, and Josh Rogers. Britton went on to post a 2.88 ERA in 25 appearances for the Yankees in the 2018 season. His 1.86 ERA from 2016 to 2018 was the lowest in major league baseball of all pitchers with 100 or more innings pitched.

Britton signed a three-year contract with an option for a fourth year with the Yankees on January 11, 2019.

In 2020, Britton was 1–2 with eight saves and a 1.89 ERA. On October 29, the Yankees picked up Britton's $14 million option for 2022.

Midway through spring training in 2021, Britton experienced elbow discomfort and a bone chip in his left elbow was discovered following an MRI, which required arthroscopic surgery and a recovery period of 3–4 months. On March 31, 2021, Britton was placed on the 60-day injured list. On June 12, Britton was activated from the injured list. On September 9, 2021, Britton underwent Tommy John surgery along with removal of bone chips in his pitching elbow.

Britton was activated from the 60-day injured list on September 22, 2022. He left the game of September 30 with arm fatigue and went back on the 60-day injured list the next day.

On November 20, 2023, Britton announced his retirement from professional baseball.

== Pitching style ==
Britton throws three pitches. His lead pitch is a sinker averaging 96 mph (maxing out at 99). He throws a four-seam fastball at the same speed. He also throws a curveball averaging 82–83. Due to his use of a fast sinker as a primary pitch, he is an extreme ground ball pitcher.

== Personal life ==
Britton is married to Courtney Leggett, whom he met in elementary school. She earned a Juris Doctor from Southern Methodist University. She supported them while Britton played in the minor leagues and gave up her career when Britton reached the major leagues. Together they have four children. They live near Austin, Texas.

His older brother Buck Britton is currently on the Orioles' major league coaching staff. He also has a cousin, Lance Britton, who hosts The Lance Britton Show on Mile High Sports Radio 1510 in Denver, Colorado.
