= Pedro Araújo (baseball) =

Dominican baseball player (born 1993)

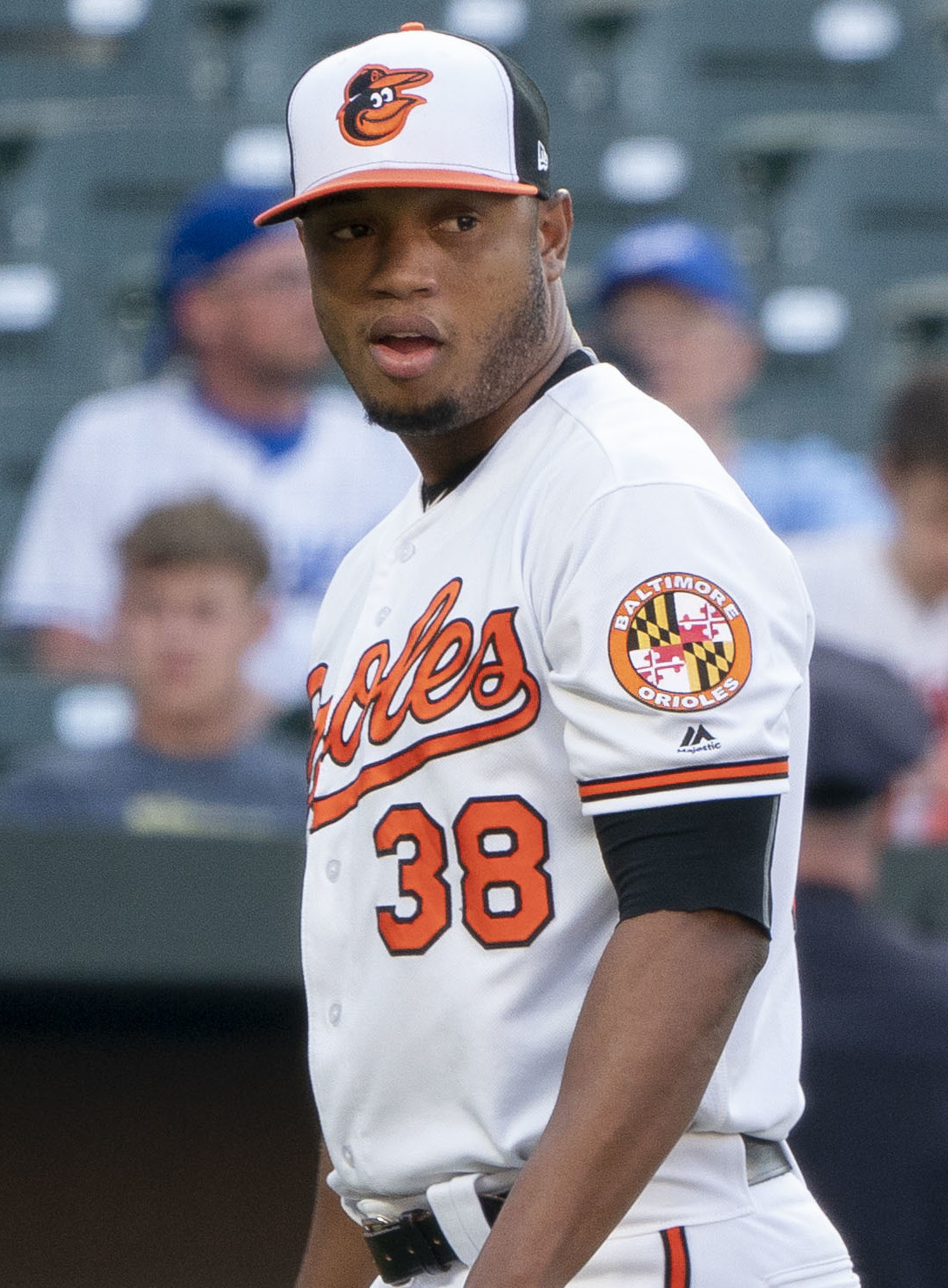
- Araújo with the Baltimore Orioles
- Pitcher
- Born: July 2, 1993 (age 33); San Cristóbal, Dominican Republic
- Batted: Right Threw: Right

MLB debut
- March 31, 2018, for the Baltimore Orioles

Last MLB appearance
- April 1, 2019, for the Baltimore Orioles

MLB statistics
- Win–loss record: 1–3
- Earned run average: 8.16
- Strikeouts: 29
- Stats at Baseball Reference

Teams
- Baltimore Orioles (2018–2019)

Pedro Araújo (born July 2, 1993) is a Dominican former professional baseball pitcher. He played in Major League Baseball (MLB) for the Baltimore Orioles.

== Career ==
=== Chicago Cubs ===
Araújo signed as an international free agent with the Chicago Cubs. Spending most of the 2017 season with the Myrtle Beach Pelicans of the High–A Carolina League, and also briefly appearing for the Tennessee Smokies of the Double–A Southern League, Araújo pitched to a 1.76 earned run average (ERA) with 87 strikeouts in 66 2/3 innings pitched. After the regular season, the Cubs assigned him to the Mesa Solar Sox of the Arizona Fall League, and he pitched to a 1.74 ERA.

=== Baltimore Orioles ===
On December 14, 2017, the Baltimore Orioles selected Araújo from the Cubs in the Rule 5 draft. He made the Orioles' Opening Day 25-man roster in 2018, and made his major league debut on March 31. On April 3, 2019, Araujo was designated for assignment following the promotion of Matt Wotherspoon. Araujo was returned to the Chicago Cubs on April 5. On the same day, Araujo was traded back to the Orioles for international pool money. In 24 appearances for the Double-A Bowie Baysox, Araujo posted a 3.63 ERA with 40 strikeouts. However, in 4 appearances for the Triple-A Norfolk Tides, he limped to a 12.54 ERA with 9 strikeouts. He became a free agent following the season on November 4.

On January 20, 2020, Araújo signed with the Diablos Rojos del México of the Mexican League. Araújo did not play in a game in 2020 due to the cancellation of the Mexican League season because of the COVID-19 pandemic. He later became a free agent.

== See also ==
- Rule 5 draft results
