= 2018 Toronto Blue Jays season =

2018 Toronto Blue Jays
- League: American League
- Division: East
- Ballpark: Rogers Centre
- City: Toronto, Ontario
- Record: 73–89 (.451)
- Divisional place: 4th
- Owners: Rogers, CEO Mark Shapiro
- General managers: Ross Atkins
- Managers: John Gibbons
- Television: Sportsnet; Sportsnet One (Buck Martinez, Pat Tabler, Dan Shulman)
- Radio: Blue Jays Radio Network; Sportsnet 590 the FAN (Ben Wagner, Mike Wilner, Kevin Barker, Dan Shulman)

The 2018 Toronto Blue Jays season was the 42nd season of the franchise in Major League Baseball (MLB), and the 28th full season of play (29th overall) at Rogers Centre.

== Offseason ==
During his end-of-season press conference on October 3, 2017, general manager Ross Atkins confirmed that the Blue Jays would decline their mutual option on José Bautista and allow him to enter free agency. Atkins also announced that the team would retain their entire coaching staff entering 2018. On October 11, the team dismissed their assistant athletic trainer, Mike Frostad, as well as head strength coach Chris Joyner. Darrell Ceciliani, Bo Schultz, and César Valdez were outrighted to the Triple-A Buffalo Bisons on November 1. The following day, Brett Anderson, Darwin Barney, Miguel Montero, and Michael Saunders became free agents. On November 4, José Bautista's $17 million mutual option for the 2018 season was officially declined by the Blue Jays, making him a free agent. Leonel Campos, Taylor Cole, Raffy Lopez, and Luis Santos were outrighted to Triple-A on November 6, and pitcher Taylor Guerrieri was claimed off waivers from the Tampa Bay Rays. Former Blue Jays pitcher Roy Halladay died on November 7, when his ICON A5 amphibious airplane crashed into the Gulf of Mexico near the Tampa Bay area of Florida. He was the only person in the airplane. The Blue Jays organization later announced plans to honour Halladay before their game on Opening Day and throughout the 2018 season, by retiring his number and wearing a black 32 patch on their jerseys for the year.

On November 20, the Blue Jays acquired Gift Ngoepe from the Pittsburgh Pirates, outrighted Chris Rowley and Harold Ramírez, lost Rob Refsnyder on a waiver claim by the Cleveland Indians, and added Conner Greene, Danny Jansen, Reese McGuire, Thomas Pannone, and Rowdy Tellez to the 40-man roster in order to protect them from the Rule 5 draft. The Blue Jays organization experienced a spike in positive tests for performance-enhancing drugs during November. Six players with the Dominican Summer League Blue Jays and one with the Gulf Coast League Blue Jays were suspended after testing positive. The team announced on November 23 that they would begin an internal investigation into the positive reports. Late in the month, it was announced that assistant general manager Andrew Tinnish had been hired by the Atlanta Braves, who had recently hired former Blue Jays general manager Alex Anthopoulos. On December 1, Tinnish announced he had withdrawn from his position with Atlanta and would remain with Toronto. Also on December 1, the Blue Jays non-tendered Ryan Goins and Tom Koehler, and traded minor league outfielder J. B. Woodman to the St. Louis Cardinals for infielder Aledmys Díaz. Head athletic trainer George Poulis, who had been with the Blue Jays organization for 18 years, was hired by the Atlanta Braves on December 5.

On January 6, 2018, the Blue Jays traded Edward Olivares and Jared Carkuff to the San Diego Padres for infielder Yangervis Solarte. Ezequiel Carrera, Josh Donaldson, Dominic Leone, Aaron Loup, Kevin Pillar, Aaron Sanchez, and Devon Travis each avoided salary arbitration with the Blue Jays on January 12, agreeing to one-year contracts. Marcus Stroman and Roberto Osuna were unable to reach agreements with the team prior to the deadline. Dominic Leone and prospect Conner Greene were traded to the St. Louis Cardinals for outfielder Randal Grichuk on January 19. Curtis Granderson's one-year, $5 million contract became official on January 23. MLB revealed their top 100 prospects list on January 27, with Blue Jays prospects Vladimir Guerrero Jr., Bo Bichette, and Anthony Alford ranking 3rd, 14th, and 47th respectively.

Roberto Osuna lost his arbitration case with the Blue Jays on February 3, and was awarded the team's $5.3 million contract instead of his requested $5.8 million. Jerry Howarth, the team's play-by-play announcer, announced his retirement on February 13 after 36 seasons with the Blue Jays. On February 15, Marcus Stroman announced through his Twitter account that he had lost his arbitration case and would make $6.5 million for the season instead of his requested salary of $6.9 million. Later that day, the team announced Jaime García had been signed to a one-year, $8 million contract that included a 2019 team option.

=== Trades ===
Date	Team in transaction	Acquired	Traded	Ref.
November 20, 2017	Pittsburgh Pirates	Gift Ngoepe	Cash considerations or a player to be named later	
December 1, 2017	St. Louis Cardinals	Aledmys Díaz	J. B. Woodman	
January 6, 2018	San Diego Padres	Yangervis Solarte	Edward Olivares; Jared Carkuff	
January 19, 2018	St. Louis Cardinals	Randal Grichuk	Dominic Leone; Conner Greene	

=== Free agency ===
==== In ====
Date	Player	Former team	Details	Ref.
November 16, 2017	Deck McGuire	Cincinnati Reds	Minor league contract with an invitation to spring training	
December 4, 2017	Luis Santos	—N/a	Minor league contract with an invitation to spring training	
January 18, 2018	Al Alburquerque	Chicago White Sox	Minor league contract with an invitation to spring training	
January 23, 2018	Curtis Granderson	Los Angeles Dodgers	One-year, $5 million contract	
January 25, 2018	Rhiner Cruz	Atlanta Braves	Minor league contract with an invitation to spring training	
February 8, 2018	Jake Petricka	Chicago White Sox	Minor league contract with an invitation to spring training	
February 8, 2018	John Axford	Oakland Athletics	Minor league contract with an invitation to spring training	
February 12, 2018	Craig Breslow	Cleveland Indians	Minor league contract with an invitation to spring training	
February 15, 2018	Jaime García	New York Yankees	One-year, $8 million contract 2019 team option	

==== Out ====
Date	Player	New team	Details	Ref.
November 22, 2017	Jeff Beliveau	Cleveland Indians	Minor league contract with an invitation to spring training	
November 22, 2017	Leonel Campos	Cleveland Indians	Minor league contract with an invitation to spring training	
December 7, 2017	Raffy Lopez	San Diego Padres	Minor league contract with an invitation to spring training	
December 13, 2017	Mike Bolsinger	Chiba Lotte Marines	One-year, $800,000 contract	
December 20, 2017	Tom Koehler	Los Angeles Dodgers	One-year contract	
December 21, 2017	Chris Smith	Washington Nationals	Minor league contract with an invitation to spring training	
January 9, 2018	Mike Ohlman	Texas Rangers	Minor league contract with an invitation to spring training	
January 24, 2018	Ryan Goins	Kansas City Royals	Minor league contract with an invitation to spring training	
February 1, 2018	Miguel Montero	Washington Nationals	Minor league contract with an invitation to spring training	
February 5, 2018	Darwin Barney	Texas Rangers	Minor league contract with an invitation to spring training	
February 21, 2018	Michael Saunders	Pittsburgh Pirates	Minor league contract with an invitation to spring training	

=== Waivers ===
==== In ====
Date	Player	Former team	Ref.
November 6, 2017	Taylor Guerrieri	Tampa Bay Rays	

==== Out ====
Date	Player	New team	Ref.
November 20, 2017	Rob Refsnyder	Cleveland Indians	

== Spring training ==
Blue Jays pitchers and catchers reported to spring training on February 14, while position players reported on February 19. Seung-hwan Oh signed a one-year, $2 million contract with Toronto on February 26. To make room on the roster, Ezequiel Carrera was designated for assignment. Carrera later cleared waivers and was invited back to spring training. Nick Tepesch signed a minor league contract with the Blue Jays on March 3, and was invited to spring training. Early in spring training, it was announced that Troy Tulowitzki had a bone spur in his right ankle, and that he would miss the start of the Grapefruit League season. On March 4, manager John Gibbons stated Tulowitzki was unlikely to be ready for Opening Day. Top prospects Vladimir Guerrero Jr. and Bo Bichette made their Grapefruit League debuts on March 8, and combined to go 6-for-8 with two RBIs and three runs scored in Toronto's 9–3 win over the Baltimore Orioles. The Blue Jays made their first cuts of spring training on March 10, optioning Rowdy Tellez to the Triple-A Buffalo Bisons, and sending Jon Harris, Sean Reid-Foley, and Jordan Romano to minor league camp. The following day, Ryan Borucki and Thomas Pannone were optioned to Buffalo, and Ezequiel Carrera was released.

On March 12, Gibbons announced that Marcus Stroman would not start on Opening Day due to shoulder inflammation he suffered early in spring training. Major League Baseball announced an 80-game suspension for Thomas Pannone on March 16, after he tested positive for a banned performance-enhancing substance. On March 20, Gibbons revealed that J. A. Happ would start on Opening Day, and be followed in the five-man rotation by Aaron Sanchez, Marco Estrada, Marcus Stroman, and Jaime García. On March 26 and 27, the Blue Jays returned to Montreal's Olympic Stadium for two games against the St. Louis Cardinals. The team finished spring training with a 14–18 record and one tie.

== Standings ==
=== American League East ===
AL East
Team	W	L	Pct.	GB	Home	Road
Boston Red Sox	108	54	.667	—	57‍–‍24	51‍–‍30
New York Yankees	100	62	.617	8	53‍–‍28	47‍–‍34
Tampa Bay Rays	90	72	.556	18	51‍–‍30	39‍–‍42
Toronto Blue Jays	73	89	.451	35	40‍–‍41	33‍–‍48
Baltimore Orioles	47	115	.290	61	28‍–‍53	19‍–‍62

=== American League Wild Card ===
Division leaders
Team	W	L	Pct.
Boston Red Sox	108	54	.667
Houston Astros	103	59	.636
Cleveland Indians	91	71	.562

Wild Card teams (Top 2 teams qualify for postseason)
Team	W	L	Pct.	GB
New York Yankees	100	62	.617	+3
Oakland Athletics	97	65	.599	—
Tampa Bay Rays	90	72	.556	7
Seattle Mariners	89	73	.549	8
Los Angeles Angels	80	82	.494	17
Minnesota Twins	78	84	.481	19
Toronto Blue Jays	73	89	.451	24
Texas Rangers	67	95	.414	30
Detroit Tigers	64	98	.395	33
Chicago White Sox	62	100	.383	35
Kansas City Royals	58	104	.358	39
Baltimore Orioles	47	115	.290	50

== Records vs opponents ==
	Record			Games Left		
Opponent	Home	Road	Total	Home	Road	Total
AL East
Baltimore Orioles	10–0	4–5	14–5	–	–	–
Boston Red Sox	3–6	1–9	4–15	–	–	–
New York Yankees	3–6	3–7	6–13	–	–	–
Tampa Bay Rays	4–6	2–7	6–13	–	–	–
Totals	20–18	10–28	30–46	–	–	–
AL Central
Chicago White Sox	2–1	2–1	4–2	–	–	–
Cleveland Indians	2–2	2–1	4–3	–	–	–
Detroit Tigers	2–2	1–2	3–4	–	–	–
Kansas City Royals	3–0	2–2	5–2	–	–	–
Minnesota Twins	0–3	2–1	2–4	–	–	–
Totals	9–8	9–7	18–15	–	–	–
AL West
Houston Astros	1–2	1–2	2–4	–	–	–
Los Angeles Angels	1–2	2–2	3–4	–	–	–
Oakland Athletics	0–4	0–3	0–7	–	–	–
Seattle Mariners	1–2	3–1	4–3	–	–	–
Texas Rangers	1–2	2–1	3–3	–	–	–
Totals	4–12	8–9	12–21	–	–	–
National League
Atlanta Braves	1–1	1–1	2–2	–	–	–
Miami Marlins	–	2–1	2–1	–	–	–
New York Mets	1–1	1–1	2–2	–	–	–
Philadelphia Phillies	2–1	2–1	4–2	–	–	–
Washington Nationals	3–0	–	3–0	–	–	–
Totals	7–3	6–4	13–7	–	–	–
Season Totals	40–41	33–48	73–89	–	–	–

Month	Games	Won	Lost	Pct.
March	3	1	2	.333
April	25	15	10	.600
May	28	9	19	.321
June	26	14	12	.538
July	24	9	15	.375
August	28	13	15	.464
September	28	12	16	.429
Totals	162	73	89	.451

== 2018 draft ==
The 2018 Major League Baseball draft began on June 4 and concluded on June 6.

Round	Pick	Player	Position	College/School	Nationality	Signed
1	12	Jordan Groshans	SS	Magnolia High School (TX)	(United States)	June 12
2	51	Griffin Conine	OF	Duke	(United States)	June 20
3	88	Adam Kloffenstein	RHP	Magnolia High School (TX)	(United States)	June 12
4	116	Sean Wymer	RHP	TCU	(United States)	June 12
5	146	Christopher Bec	C	Maine	(United States)	June 12
6	176	Addison Barger	SS	C. Leon King High School (FL)	(United States)	June 12
7	206	Nick Podkul	3B	Notre Dame	(United States)	June 12
8	236	Joey Murray	RHP	Kent State	(United States)	June 12
9	266	Jake Brodt	1B	Santa Clara	(United States)	June 12
10	296	Cal Stevenson	OF	Arizona	(United States)	June 12

== Regular season ==
=== Opening Day ===
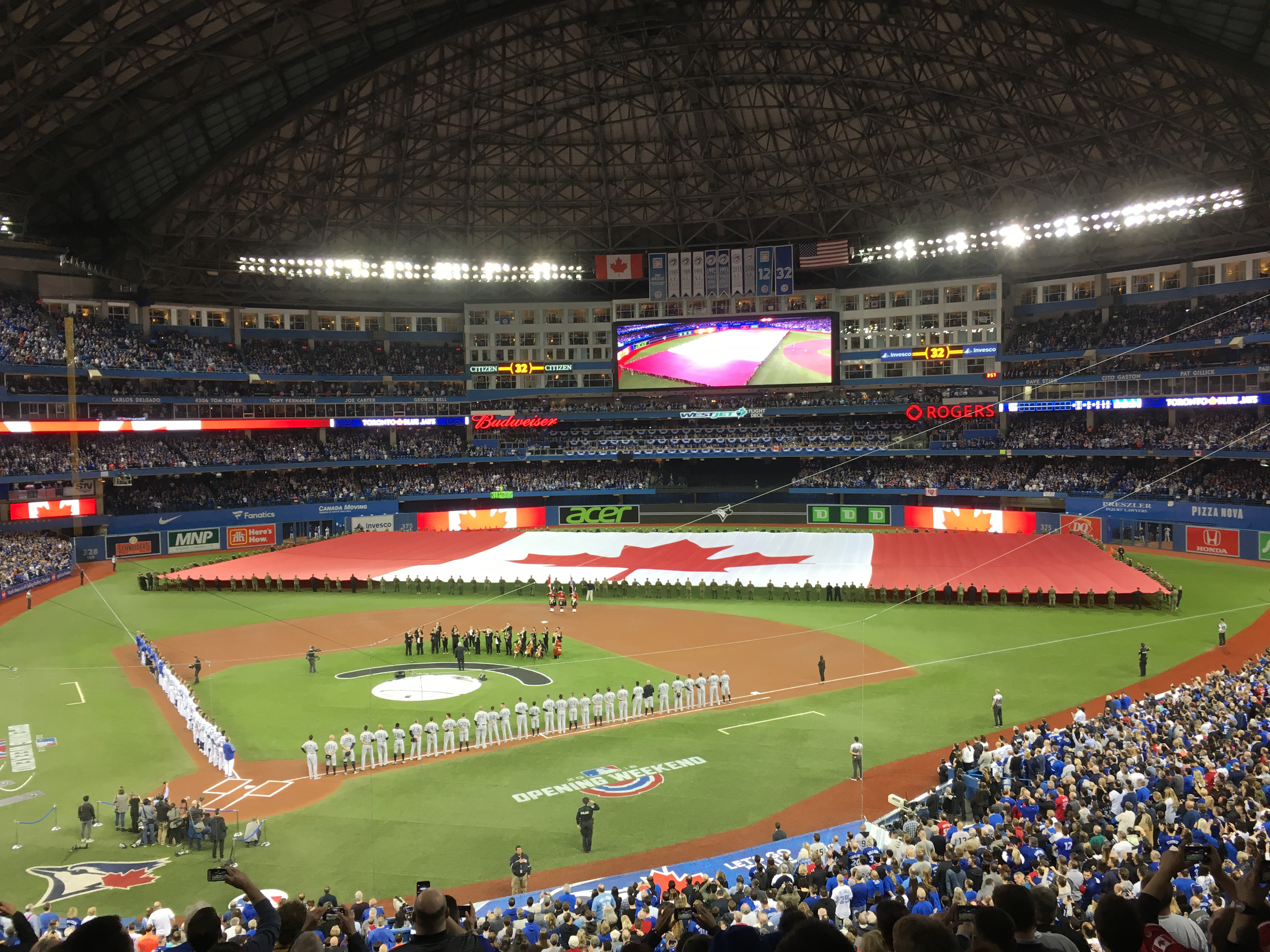
The Rogers Centre on Opening Day

Opening Day starters
Position	Name
Catcher	Russell Martin
First baseman	Justin Smoak
Second baseman	Devon Travis
Shortstop	Aledmys Díaz
Third baseman	Josh Donaldson
Left fielder	Curtis Granderson
Center fielder	Kevin Pillar
Right fielder	Randal Grichuk
Designated hitter	Kendrys Morales
Pitcher	J. A. Happ

=== March and April ===
The Blue Jays opened the 2018 regular season with a four-game series against the New York Yankees. Roy Halladay, who died in the offseason in a plane crash, was honoured before the game and had his number 32 retired by the team. In the first game, Yankees' offseason acquisition Giancarlo Stanton led the way on offence, hitting two home runs in the 6–1 loss for Toronto. Masahiro Tanaka held the Toronto offence at bay in game two, yielding just a single run in six innings as the Jays fell 4–2. Toronto earned their first win of the 2018 season in the third game, 5–3. Yangervis Solarte hit the go-ahead home run in the eighth inning, before Kevin Pillar added an insurance run by stealing home, after having singled and stolen both second and third base. The Blue Jays split the series with a 7–4 win on April 1, thanks to Justin Smoak's grand slam in the eighth inning. The team then began a three-game series against the Chicago White Sox. Russell Martin's first home run of the season gave the Jays the lead in the seventh inning, and Roberto Osuna earned his second save of the year in the 4–2 victory. A seven-run eighth inning by the Jays in the second game led to a 14–5 rout of Chicago. The Blue Jays were denied their first sweep of the season, after José Abreu's go-ahead solo home run gave the White Sox a 4–3 win.

The Blue Jays opened their 2018 road play in Arlington for three games against the Texas Rangers. The Jays took an 8–0 lead in the sixth inning of the first game, and held on to win 8–5. The Rangers took the second game, 5–1, with Rangers starter Mike Minor earning his first win as a starting pitcher since the 2014 season. In the rubber match, Rangers ace Cole Hamels allowed two first-inning home runs, and Toronto took the series with a 7–4 victory. The Jays then made their first trip to Camden Yards to take on the Baltimore Orioles. Josh Donaldson's late-game grand slam gave the Blue Jays a 7–1 win. The game's paid attendance of 7,915 was the lowest in Orioles history, aside from the game played to an empty stadium during the 2015 riots. Aaron Sanchez took a no-hitter into the seventh inning of the second game, as the Jays edged the Orioles 2–1 thanks to a late home run by Curtis Granderson. Baltimore took the final game of the series, 5–3. To close the season's first road trip, the Blue Jays traveled to Cleveland, to take on the Indians. Prior to the first game, Toronto placed Josh Donaldson on the disabled list. The Jays went down 4–0 through two innings in the first game, before scoring eight unanswered runs to take the game 8–4. The other two scheduled games of the series were rained out, and postponed to May 3 for a doubleheader.

Returning home for a brief, three-game series against the Kansas City Royals, the Blue Jays experienced just their second postponement since moving to the Rogers Centre in 1989. A section of ice, formed during a weekend freezing rain storm, fell from the CN Tower and pierced the roof of the stadium, forcing the team to schedule a doubleheader for the following day due to safety concerns. A six-run sixth inning in the first game cemented the win for the Jays, while backup catcher Luke Maile's walk-off single in the tenth inning of the second game gave Toronto the rare home doubleheader sweep, by scores of 11–3 and 5–4. The Blue Jays would complete the series sweep with a 15–5 win on April 18, led by Curtis Granderson's ninth-career grand slam. The team then returned to the road for four games against the Yankees. They would split the first two games of the series, with the Yankees winning the first 4–3 and the Jays taking the second 8–5. New York would hold the Blue Jays to a single run in each of the next two games, taking the series with 9–1 and 5–1 victories.

=== May ===
The Blue Jays struggled through a generally mediocre month of May. Reasons for their struggles throughout the month were generally attributed to the Blue Jays having lost Osuna to administrative leave following accusations of domestic violence, the suspension of Osuna for 75 games for that offence, and injuries to several key players such as Josh Donaldson. For the first time since the month of May 1979, the team failed to win back-to-back games for the entire month.

The team posted their lowest monthly winning percentage of the season in the month of May (.322) after winning just nine games while losing nineteen. A significant detriment to the team's record was being swept twice during the month, first by the Boston Red Sox and then the Oakland Athletics, which added seven losses without any wins. The Blue Jays began their season with a three-game series against the Minnesota Twins at their home stadium, Rogers Centre, which they won two games to one behind their strong offensive performance, scoring fourteen runs over the series. The team travelled to face the Cleveland Indians in two make-up games, which were postponed after rain and inclement weather forced a postponement of the games that were originally scheduled for April 14 and April 15. They won the first game in extra innings 13–11 after they scored four runs in the eleventh inning, but lost the second game 4–13 after the Indians were able to score nine runs in a single inning.

Over each of the next three consecutive three-game series, where they played against Tampa Bay Rays, Seattle Mariners, and Boston Red Sox, the Blue Jays posted the same losing record of 1–2. In the first series against Tampa Bay at Tropicana Field, they lost the first two games by a combined five runs to eleven behind a strong pitching performance from the Rays. They won the third and final game of the series 2–1, only after a wild pitch in the ninth inning allowed the winning run to score. After having their first day off in two full weeks, the Blue Jays returned home to face the Mariners in a three-game series. They lost the first game 0–5, after pitcher James Paxton, a Canada native, threw a no-hitter to leave the Blue Jays without a hit or run over nine innings. They would win the next game 5–2, as the team got twelve hits to the Rays’ five; however, on the next night, the Rays would get seventeen hits to the Blue Jays’ eight in a 3–9 loss. The Blue Jays remained at home to play the Red Sox in a three-game series. They won the first game 5–3 in extra innings, as catcher Luke Maile hit two home runs, one to tie the game in the seventh inning, and one to win the game in the bottom of the twelfth inning. However, the team would lose the next two games behind strong pitching and hitting performances from the Red Sox.

After playing the last two series at home, the Blue Jays travelled to Citi Field to play the New York Mets in a two-game series. They lost the first game 2–12 behind a strong pitching and hitting performance from the Mets’ starting pitcher, Noah Syndergaard. However, they won the second game 12–1 as the team got fifteen hits, and their starting pitcher, J.A. Happ, only allowed two hits while striking out ten batters over seven innings. This would be the first time the Blue Jays would win against the Mets in a road game in franchise history. After their series against the Mets, the Blue Jays returned home to Rogers Centre to play a four-game series against the Oakland Athletics. Despite both teams having an even 22–22 record following the first game in the series, the Athletics would go on to sweep the Blue Jays. The team was limited to twelve total runs over the four losses, compared to the Athletics’ twenty-seven. This would be the second time, and not the last, that the team would lose four straight games in the 2018 season. After a day off, the Blue Jays remained at home to play a three-game series against the Los Angeles Angels. They snapped their four-game losing streak with a 5–3 win in the first game, where they scored all five runs in the first inning. However, they would go on to lose the next two games and the series. They were up 3–0 in the bottom of the fifth inning, but after the Angels scored four runs in the top of the ninth inning, the Blue Jays ended up losing 4–5. They would also lose the last game 1–8 behind a robust offensive performance from the Angels.

After losing eight of their last ten games, the Blue Jays travelled to Citizens Bank Park to play the Philadelphia Phillies in a three-game series. They won the first game 6–5 as the Blue Jays’ bullpen held on to win a game that the team was winning 6–1 in the bottom of the fifth inning. However, the team would go on to lose the next game 1–2 after two short rain delays and a strong pitching performance from the Phillies’ starter Aaron Nola. Behind an eight-strikeout pitching performance from their starter J.A. Happ, the Blue Jays won the final game of the series 5–3. This would be the first time in a month that the team would win a series. To complete a rather mediocre month of May, the Blue Jays would get swept by the Boston Red Sox in a three-game series at Fenway Park. They lost both the first and the second game 3–8, as the Red Sox offense was lethal throughout both games. They lost the final game in the series 4–6 to complete the sweep for Boston, as Red Sox outfielder J.D. Martinez hit his league-tying eighteenth home run. By the end of an unexceptional month of May, the Blue Jays would have a subpar 25–31 overall record, and would be fourteen games behind the first-place Boston Red Sox in the American League East Division.

=== June ===
Coming off a below-average month of May, the Blue Jays would look to improve on their 25–31 overall record. Although they would lose the first two games in the month of June to the Detroit Tigers, the Blue Jays would go on to win fourteen games in June while losing twelve. June would be the last month of the regular season where the Blue Jays would post a winning record, and the only such month other than April, when the team posted a 15–10 record. In the first series of the month, the Blue Jays travelled to Comerica Park to play three games against the Detroit Tigers. They would lose the first two games as the Detroit offense scored twelve combined runs to the Blue Jays’ seven. They would win the next game 8–4 behind a strong performance by their starting pitcher Aaron Sanchez, breaking a five-game losing streak dating back to late May. After a day off, the Blue Jays returned home to play the New York Yankees at the Rogers Centre in a two-game series. They would lose both games after the high-powered offense of the Yankees put up ten combined runs to the Blue Jays’ two. This would not be the last time that the Blue Jays were swept in a series or shutout in a game during the month of June.

After losing eight out of their last ten games, the Blue Jays would go on to sweep the Baltimore Orioles in a four-game series at home, their first time being on the positive side of a sweep since the middle of April. They outscored the Orioles by a combined twenty-seven runs to eleven, including a thirteen-run win in the fourth and final game of the series. After winning their last four games, the Blue Jays would travel to Tropicana Field to play a three-game series against the Tampa Bay Rays. In their second series against the Rays this season, the Blue Jays would get swept, including a 1–0 shutout in the third and final game. After a day off to return home to Rogers Centre, the Blue Jays would face the Washington Nationals in a three-game series. They would go on to sweep the Nationals in three games, the second of which was as 2-0 shutout, behind strong offensive performances by their starting infielder Yangervis Solarte. After winning seven of their last ten games, the Blue Jays faced the Atlanta Braves in a two-game series at home. They lost the first game 4–11, as the Braves got fourteen hits while hitting two home runs; they would go on to win the second game 5–4 behind a strong performance from their starting pitcher J.A. Happ, who struck out eight batters over 8 1/3 innings.

The Blue Jays then travelled to Angel Stadium to face the Los Angeles Angels in a four-game series. The team would lose the first two games, 8-5 and 2–1, despite getting more tying or beating the Angels in hits both games. They would go on to win the next game 4–1, after scoring three runs in the top of the ninth inning. They would also win the following game 7–6 in extra innings, as designated hitter Kendrys Morales hit a pinch-hit home run in the top of the tenth inning. The Blue Jays then travelled to Minute Maid Park to face the Houston Astros in a three-game series. The team would win the first game 6–3, as starting outfielder Curtis Granderson hit two home runs. They would then go on to lose the next two games, the first of which was a 0–7 shutout behind a dominant performance from Astros’ starting pitcher Charlie Morton, and the second of which was a 6–7 loss as Astros’ starting infielder Alex Bregman hit a two-run walk-off home run to seal the comeback win. The final series of the month of June for the Blue Jays would be a four-game series against the Detroit Tigers at Rogers Centre. As the Blue Jays began the month with two losses to the Tigers, they ended the month with two wins against them. They won the first game 3–2 behind a stellar seven-inning performance from their starting pitcher Marcus Stroman. In their last final game of the month of June, the team won 4–3 as starting first baseman Justin Smoak hit a walk-off home run in the bottom of the ninth inning to seal the win. By the end of an adequate month of June, the Blue Jays would have a below-average 39–43 overall record, and would be sixteen games behind the first-place Boston Red Sox in the American League East Division.

=== July ===
After a competent month of June where the team posted a 14–12 record, the Blue Jays would only worsen their 39–43 overall record. The team would post an abysmal 9–15 record in July, their second-worst winning percentage by month (.375), only after May. They would begin by the month by losing their first two games, which were the final two games of a four-game series at home with the Detroit Tigers that began in late June. They would lose by a combined 12–3 after a strong offensive performance from the Tigers’ starting outfielder Nick Castellanos in the first game, and an exceptional eight-inning performance from the Tigers’ starting pitcher Mike Fiers in the second game. The Blue Jays would then play the New York Mets in Rogers Centre in two-game series. They would win the first game 8–6, but then lose the next one 3–6. After a day off, the Blue Jays played the New York Yankees in a three-game series at home. They would win the first game 6–2 as starting first baseman Justin Smoak hit a three-run home run early, but would then lose the next two 5-8 and 1–2, respectively.

After playing three consecutive home series, the Blue Jays travelled to SunTrust Park to play the Atlanta Braves in a two-game series. The team would win the first game 6–2 as starting pitcher Marcus Stroman pitched six innings while only allowing one run. They would lose the second game 5–9 as the Braves scored six runs by the end of the second inning. The Blue Jays then travelled to Fenway Park to play the Boston Red Sox in a four-game series. The team would get its lone win in the series in the second game as they won 13–7, but would lose the other three games by a combined seventeen runs to eight. After a four-day break for the MLB Home Run Derby and All-Star Game, which only included one selection from the Blue Jays (J.A. Happ) and symbolically marks the halfway point in the regular season, the Blue Jays faced the Baltimore Orioles in a three-game series at Rogers Centre. Similarly to the last time the team played the Orioles in a series, the Blue Jays completed the sweep. They beat the Orioles in three close games, 8–7, 4–1, and 5–4.

Looking to improve on their three-game win streak, the Blue Jays faced the Minnesota Twins in a three-game series at home. The team would go on to lose their next three games, as the Twins completed the sweep. The second game was a 0–5 shutout as Twins’ starting pitcher Jose Berrios threw seven scoreless innings with nine strikeouts. After a day off, the Blue Jays travelled to Guaranteed Rate Field to play the Chicago White Sox in a three-game series. The Blue Jays would win the series two games to one, which would be the second and last winning series for the team in the month of July. The month of July would end in a similar way as it began for the Blue Jays, as they lost their final two games by a combined sixteen runs to three in a three-game series against the Oakland Athletics. By the end of a mediocre month of July, the Blue Jays would have a subpar 48–58 overall record, and would be a dispiriting 25 1/2 games behind the first-place Boston Red Sox in the American League East Division.

=== August ===
After an inadequate month of July where the Blue Jays won only nine of their twenty-four games, the team would only perform slightly better in August. They would post a 13–15 record for the month, winning four more games than the previous month but still losing more than winning. The first game of August would be the third and final game of a three-game series against the Oakland Athletics that began in late July. The Blue Jays lost 3–8, and the Athletics were able to sweep to Blue Jays for the second time this season. The Blue Jays then travelled to T-Mobile Park to face the Seattle Mariners in a four-game series. After a three-game losing streak, the team won the next three games by a combined 19–6 to win the series, but then lost the fourth and final game 3–6. After three consecutive road series, the Blue Jays returned home to Rogers Centre to play the Boston Red Sox in a three-game series. They lost the first two games, as the Red Sox posted ten runs in both games while the Blue Jays scored seven and five, respectively, but then won the third and final game of the series 8–5. The team then faced the Tampa Bay Rays in a three-game series, but ended up losing the series two games to one as they only scored five runs to the Rays’ ten. They lost the first game as they were shutout 0–7, but won the third and final game 2–1.

After playing six games at home, the Blue Jays travelled to Kauffman Stadium to face the Kansas City Royals in a four-game series. They lost the first game 1–3 as Royals’ starting pitcher Brad Keller threw seven innings only allowing one run. They won the next two games by the same score, 6–5. The team lost the fourth and final game of the series 2–6, as they scored two runs in the first four innings and did not score again. They then travelled to Yankee Stadium to play a three-game series against the New York Yankees. The Blue Jays were swept as the Yankees offense remained strong throughout the series, scoring twenty-eight runs to the Blue Jays’ thirteen. In the final game, J.A. Happ received the win as starting pitcher for the Yankees against his former team, as he was traded from the Blue Jays to the Yankees for an infielder Brandon Drury and outfielder Billy McKinney in the previous month. After being on the negative side of a sweep, the Blue Jays would go on to sweep the Baltimore Orioles in a three-game series at home at Rogers Centre. They outscored the Orioles by a combined nineteen runs to five, including a shutout in the third and final game of the series.

The Blue Jays looked to improve on their three-game win streak as they faced the Philadelphia Phillies in a three-game series at home. They would win the first two games, 4-2 and 8–6, respectively, and extend their win streak to five games, but would go on to lose the third and final game of the series, 3–8. The team then travelled to Oriole Park to play the Baltimore Orioles in a three-game series. Only a week after the Blue Jays’ last series against the Orioles where they completed the sweep, the Blue Jays were on the losing side of a sweep, as they lost their next three consecutive games to the Orioles. The first game of the series was a 0–7 shutout; the Orioles did not score fewer than seven runs in any of the three games. After a day off, the team travelled to Marlins Park to face the Miami Marlins in a three-game series. The final game of August for the Blue Jays was a 6–5 win against the Marlins to start the series, as the Blue Jays scored five runs in the top of the ninth inning to complete the comeback. By the end of a disappointing month of August, the Blue Jays would have a below-average 61–73 overall record, and would be a discouraging 31 games behind the first-place Boston Red Sox in the American League East Division.

=== September ===
After an insufficient month of August, as the Blue Jays were swept twice and won thirteen games out of a possible twenty-eight, the team's hopes for making the postseason were in jeopardy as the final month of the regular season began. The team would perform worse in September than they did in the previous month, as they would post a 12–16 record for the month, and be eliminated from playoff contention in early September. The first two games of the month of September were the final two games of a three-game series against the Miami Marlins that had begun the previous day in August. The Blue Jays would lose the second game of the series 3–6, but win the third game 6–1, as starting pitcher Sean Reid-Foley pitched seven innings with ten strikeouts. The Blue Jays then returned home to Rogers Centre to play the Tampa Bay Rays in a three-game series. Although they lost the first two games, by a score of 1-7 and 0–4, respectively, they won the third and final game of the series 10–3, after scoring seven runs in the bottom of the first inning.

The Blue Jays remained at home to play a four-game series against the Cleveland Indians. They alternated games with the Indians, losing the first 4–9, winning the second 3–2, losing the third 8–9, and winning the final game 6–2. Following the 8–9 loss in the third game of the series, the Blue Jays were mathematically eliminated from playoff contention. After a day off, the team travelled to Fenway Park to face the Boston Red Sox in a three-game series. For the ninth and final time, the Blue Jays were swept. The Red Sox outscored the Blue Jays twelve runs to five during the three-game series. After losing to the best team in their division in the Red Sox, the Blue Jays travelled to Yankee Stadium to play a three-game series against the second-best team in the American League East, the New York Yankees. They would be shutout in the first game 0–11, but would win the final two games 8-7 and 3–2, respectively. The team would then travel to Orioles Park to play the Baltimore Orioles in a three-game series. They would shutout the Orioles in the first game 5–0, win the second game 6–4, and lose 1–2 in the final game of the series.

After playing three consecutive three-game series on the road, the Blue Jays returned home to Rogers Centre to play a four-game series against the Tampa Bay Rays. They would alternate games with the Rays, winning the first game 9–8, losing the second 3–11, winning the third 5–2, and losing the final game 2–5. For their final home series of the regular season, the Blue Jays played the Houston Astros in a three-game series. They would lose the first two games, 3-5 and 1–4, respectively, but would win their final home game of the regular season 3–1. For their final series of the regular season, the Blue Jays travelled to Tropicana Field to face the Tampa Bay Rays in a three-game series to complete the regular season. This series would mark the third meeting of these teams in the month of September, and the final game for both teams for the 2018 season, as neither team would reach the postseason. The Blue Jays would receive their final win of the season in the first game of the series, as they won 7–6. They would go on to lose the final two games of the series, and the season, 3-4 and 4–9, respectively.

By the end of the month of September, the MLB regular season ended, and the season formally concluded for the Blue Jays. The team finished with a below-average 73–89 overall record, did not reach the postseason, and were 35 games behind the Boston Red Sox, who would go on to win the American League East division title, and the 2018 World Series championship.

=== Game log ===
Legend
Blue Jays win	Blue Jays loss	Game postponed

2018 Game Log
March: 1–2 (Home: 1–2; Road: 0–0)

#	Date	Opponent	Score	Win	Loss	Save	Attendance	Record	GB
1	March 29	Yankees	1–6	Severino (1–0)	Happ (0–1)	—	48,115	0–1	1
2	March 30	Yankees	2–4	Tanaka (1–0)	Sanchez (0–1)	Chapman (1)	33,716	0–2	2
3	March 31	Yankees	5–3	Tepera (1–0)	Betances (0–1)	Osuna (1)	37,692	1–2	1

April: 15–10 (Home: 8–5; Road: 7–5)

#	Date	Opponent	Score	Win	Loss	Save	Attendance	Record	GB
4	April 1	Yankees	7–4	Clippard (1–0)	Robertson (0–1)	Oh (1)	29,091	2–2	1
5	April 2	White Sox	4–2	Oh (1–0)	Farquhar (1–1)	Osuna (2)	16,629	3–2	1
6	April 3	White Sox	14–5	Happ (1–1)	González (0–1)	—	17,451	4–2	1
7	April 4	White Sox	3–4	Jones (1–0)	Tepera (1–1)	Soria (2)	17,268	4–3	1½
8	April 6	@ Rangers	8–5	Estrada (1–0)	Moore (0–2)	Osuna (3)	21,670	5–3	1½
9	April 7	@ Rangers	1–5	Minor (1–1)	Stroman (0–1)	—	26,229	5–4	2½
10	April 8	@ Rangers	7–4	García (1–0)	Hamels (1–2)	Osuna (4)	26,902	6–4	2½
11	April 9	@ Orioles	7–1	Happ (2–1)	Bundy (0–1)	—	7,915	7–4	2
12	April 10	@ Orioles	2–1	Sanchez (1–1)	O'Day (0–1)	Osuna (5)	8,640	8–4	2
13	April 11	@ Orioles	3–5	Gausman (1–1)	Estrada (1–1)	Brach (3)	10,399	8–5	2
14	April 13	@ Indians	8–4	Barnes (1–0)	McAllister (0–2)	—	25,592	9–5	2½
–	April 14	@ Indians	Postponed (rain). Makeup date: May 3.						
–	April 15	@ Indians	Postponed (rain). Makeup date: May 3.						
–	April 16	Royals	Postponed (roof damage). Makeup date: April 17.						
15	April 17	Royals	11–3	García (2–0)	Skoglund (0–2)	—	18,645	10–5	3
16	April 17	Royals	5–4 (10)	Clippard (2–0)	Flynn (0–1)	—	18,645	11–5	3
17	April 18	Royals	15–5	Happ (3–1)	Kennedy (1–2)	—	28,803	12–5	3
18	April 19	@ Yankees	3–4	Green (1–0)	Sanchez (1–2)	Chapman (3)	36,665	12–6	4
19	April 20	@ Yankees	8–5	Estrada (2–1)	Germán (0–1)	Osuna (6)	39,197	13–6	4
20	April 21	@ Yankees	1–9	Montgomery (2–0)	Stroman (0–2)	—	40,986	13–7	4
21	April 22	@ Yankees	1–5	Severino (4–1)	García (2–1)	—	43,628	13–8	4
22	April 24	Red Sox	4–3 (10)	Clippard (3–0)	Kimbrel (0–1)	—	20,070	14–8	3
23	April 25	Red Sox	3–4	Rodríguez (3–0)	Barnes (1–1)	Kimbrel (6)	18,914	14–9	4
24	April 26	Red Sox	4–5	Sale (2–1)	Estrada (2–2)	Kimbrel (7)	23,571	14–10	5
25	April 27	Rangers	4–6	Minor (2–1)	Stroman (0–3)	Kela (5)	26,312	14–11	5
26	April 28	Rangers	4–7	Colón (1–0)	García (2–2)	Kela (6)	39,176	14–12	5
27	April 29	Rangers	7–2	Happ (4–1)	Pérez (2–3)	—	31,669	15–12	5
28	April 30	@ Twins	7–5	Sanchez (2–2)	Lynn (0–3)	Osuna (7)	16,456	16–12	5

May: 9–19 (Home: 3–10; Road: 6–9)

#	Date	Opponent	Score	Win	Loss	Save	Attendance	Record	GB
29	May 1	@ Twins	7–4 (10)	Clippard (4–0)	Curtiss (0–1)	Osuna (8)	16,245	17–12	4
30	May 2	@ Twins	0–4	Romero (1–0)	Stroman (0–4)	—	16,420	17–13	5
31	May 3	@ Indians	13–11 (11)	Mayza (1–0)	Olson (0–1)	—	19,007	18–13	4½
32	May 3	@ Indians	4–13	Plutko (1–0)	Biagini (0–1)	—	19,007	18–14	4½
33	May 4	@ Rays	2–6	Yarbrough (2–1)	Happ (4–2)	—	11,117	18–15	5½
34	May 5	@ Rays	3–5	Faria (3–1)	Sanchez (2–3)	Colomé (6)	16,297	18–16	6½
35	May 6	@ Rays	2–1	Tepera (2–1)	Colomé (2–4)	Osuna (9)	14,032	19–16	6½
36	May 8	Mariners	0–5	Paxton (2–1)	Stroman (0–5)	—	20,513	19–17	6½
37	May 9	Mariners	5–2	Tepera (3–1)	Nicasio (1–1)	Clippard (1)	20,290	20–17	6½
38	May 10	Mariners	3–9	Leake (4–3)	Happ (4–3)	—	22,315	20–18	6½
39	May 11	Red Sox	5–3 (12)	Gaviglio (1–0)	Johnson (1–2)	—	28,695	21–18	5½
40	May 12	Red Sox	2–5	Price (3–4)	Estrada (2–3)	Kimbrel (11)	37,588	21–19	6½
41	May 13	Red Sox	3–5	Velázquez (5–0)	Biagini (0–2)	Kelly (2)	37,888	21–20	7½
42	May 15	@ Mets	2–12	Syndergaard (3–1)	García (2–3)	–	28,967	21–21	8
43	May 16	@ Mets	12–1	Happ (5–3)	Wheeler (2–3)	—	28,400	22–21	7½
44	May 17	Athletics	5–10	Petit (1–0)	Sanchez (2–4)	—	22,893	22–22	8
45	May 18	Athletics	1–3	Coulombe (1–1)	Estrada (2–4)	Treinen (9)	21,703	22–23	8
46	May 19	Athletics	4–5	Pagán (1–0)	Clippard (4–1)	Treinen (10)	35,786	22–24	9
47	May 20	Athletics	2–9	Mengden (4–4)	Biagini (0–3)		30,676	22–25	10
48	May 22	Angels	5–3	Happ (6–3)	Richards (4–3)	Clippard (2)	21,480	23–25	10
49	May 23	Angels	4–5	Anderson (1–1)	Clippard (4–2)	Parker (3)	25,504	23–26	11
50	May 24	Angels	1–8	Tropeano (2–3)	Estrada (2–5)	—	43,344	23–27	11
51	May 25	@ Phillies	6–5	Gaviglio (2–0)	Eflin (1–1)	Tepera (1)	21,374	24–27	11
52	May 26	@ Phillies	1–2	Domínguez (1–0)	Biagini (0–4)	García (1)	26,788	24–28	12
53	May 27	@ Phillies	5–3	Happ (7–3)	Pivetta (4–3)	Tepera (2)	24,182	25–28	11
54	May 28	@ Red Sox	3–8	Price (5–4)	Sanchez (2–5)	—	34,700	25–29	12
55	May 29	@ Red Sox	3–8	Porcello (7–2)	Estrada (2–6)	Kimbrel (17)	33,380	25–30	13
56	May 30	@ Red Sox	4–6	Rodríguez (6–1)	Gaviglio (2–1)	Kimbrel (18)	33,451	25–31	14

June: 14–12 (Home: 10–3; Road: 4–9)

#	Date	Opponent	Score	Win	Loss	Save	Attendance	Record	GB
57	June 1	@ Tigers	2–5	Hardy (2–0)	García (2–4)	Greene (14)	22,192	25–32	13½
58	June 2	@ Tigers	4–7	Coleman (3–0)	Oh (1–1)	Jiménez (1)	34,674	25–33	14½
59	June 3	@ Tigers	8–4	Sanchez (3–5)	Fulmer (2–5)	—	24,658	26–33	14½
60	June 5	Yankees	2–7	Sabathia (3–1)	Oh (1–2)	—	29,308	26–34	15½
61	June 6	Yankees	0–3 (13)	Robertson (4–2)	Biagini (0–5)	Chapman (15)	27,838	26–35	16½
62	June 7	Orioles	5–4 (10)	Barnes (2–1)	Castro (1–2)	—	24,494	27–35	15½
63	June 8	Orioles	5–1	Happ (8–3)	Cashner (2–8)	Tepera (3)	28,863	28–35	15
64	June 9	Orioles	4–3 (10)	Axford (1–0)	Givens (0–2)	–	34,643	29–35	15
65	June 10	Orioles	13–3	Estrada (3–6)	Cobb (2–8)	—	33,485	30–35	14
66	June 11	@ Rays	4–8	Yarbrough (5–2)	Gaviglio (2–2)	—	10,769	30–36	14½
67	June 12	@ Rays	1–4	Pruitt (2–3)	García (2–5)	Romo (2)	11,162	30–37	15½
68	June 13	@ Rays	0–1	Castillo (1–0)	Tepera (3–2)	—	10,847	30–38	16½
69	June 15	Nationals	6–5	Oh (2–2)	González (6–3)	Tepera (4)	29,633	31–38	16
70	June 16	Nationals	2–0	Estrada (4–6)	Scherzer (10–3)	Clippard (3)	36,044	32–38	16
71	June 17	Nationals	8–6	Tepera (4–2)	Madson (1–3)	—	35,146	33–38	15
72	June 19	Braves	4–11	Freeman (2–3)	García (2–6)	—	32,466	33–39	16
73	June 20	Braves	5–4	Happ (9–3)	Sánchez (3–1)	Tepera (5)	45,563	34–39	16
74	June 21	@ Angels	5–8	Ramirez (3–3)	Axford (1–1)	Anderson (3)	30,416	34–40	17
75	June 22	@ Angels	1–2	Heaney (4–5)	Estrada (4–7)	Parker (9)	38,028	34–41	17
76	June 23	@ Angels	4–1	Oh (3–2)	Anderson (1–2)	Tepera (6)	40,612	35–41	16
77	June 24	@ Angels	7–6 (10)	Tepera (5–2)	Robles (2–3)	Clippard (4)	33,102	36–41	15
78	June 25	@ Astros	6–3	Happ (10–3)	Verlander (9–3)	Oh (2)	28,791	37–41	15
79	June 26	@ Astros	0–7	Morton (10–1)	Borucki (0–1)	—	38,700	37–42	16
80	June 27	@ Astros	6–7	Harris (3–3)	Tepera (5–3)	—	39,191	37–43	16½
81	June 29	Tigers	3–2	Stroman (1–5)	Liriano (3–4)	Clippard (5)	24,068	38–43	16
82	June 30	Tigers	4–3	Oh (4–2)	Jiménez (3–1)	—	27,066	39–43	16

July: 9–15 (Home: 5–8; Road: 4–7)

#	Date	Opponent	Score	Win	Loss	Save	Attendance	Record	GB
83	July 1	Tigers	1–9	Zimmermann (3–0)	Happ (10–4)	—	37,445	39–44	16
84	July 2	Tigers	2–3 (10)	Jiménez (4–1)	Oh (4–3)	Hardy (1)	29,575	39–45	17
85	July 3	Mets	8–6	Axford (2–1)	Peterson (1–1)	Clippard (6)	24,010	40–45	17
86	July 4	Mets	3–6	Lugo (3–3)	Stroman (1–6)	Familia (16)	26,038	40–46	18
87	July 6	Yankees	6–2	Biagini (1–5)	Gray (5–7)	—	37,254	41–46	18
88	July 7	Yankees	5–8	Severino (14–2)	Happ (10–5)	—	44,352	41–47	19
89	July 8	Yankees	1–2 (10)	Green (5–1)	Clippard (4–3)	Robertson (2)	39,866	41–48	20
90	July 10	@ Braves	6–2	Stroman (2–6)	Minter (3–2)	—	31,747	42–48	20½
91	July 11	@ Braves	5–9	Foltynewicz (7–5)	Gaviglio (2–3)	—	27,839	42–49	21½
92	July 12	@ Red Sox	4–6	Price (10–6)	Happ (10–6)	Kimbrel (29)	37,182	42–50	22½
93	July 13	@ Red Sox	13–7	Petricka (1–0)	Porcello (11–4)	—	37,018	43–50	21½
94	July 14	@ Red Sox	2–6 (10)	Kimbrel (2–1)	Rowley (0–1)	—	36,390	43–51	22½
95	July 15	@ Red Sox	2–5	Workman (2–0)	Stroman (2–7)	Kimbrel (30)	36,940	43–52	23½
96	July 20	Orioles	8–7 (10)	Axford (3–1)	Fry (0–1)	—	31,115	44–52	23½
97	July 21	Orioles	4–1	Stroman (3–7)	Cobb (2–13)	Tepera (7)	35,912	45–52	22½
98	July 22	Orioles	5–4	Axford (4–1)	Scott (1–2)	Clippard (7)	39,021	46–52	22½
99	July 23	Twins	3–8	Mejía (1–0)	Santos (0–1)	—	25,405	46–53	23½
100	July 24	Twins	0–5	Berríos (10–7)	Borucki (0–2)	—	31,933	46–54	23½
101	July 25	Twins	6–12 (11)	Belisle (1–0)	Petricka (1–1)	—	32,686	46–55	23½
102	July 27	@ White Sox	10–5	Stroman (4–7)	López (4–9)	—	20,524	47–55	23½
103	July 28	@ White Sox	5–9	Minaya (1–2)	Tepera (5–4)	—	29,442	47–56	24½
104	July 29	@ White Sox	7–4	Santos (1–1)	Fry (0–2)	—	23,836	48–56	24½
105	July 30	@ Athletics	1–10	Jackson (2–2)	Estrada (4–8)	—	11,449	48–57	25½
106	July 31	@ Athletics	2–6	Cahill (3–2)	Gaviglio (2–4)	—	17,325	48–58	25½

August: 13–15 (Home: 7–5; Road: 6–10)

#	Date	Opponent	Score	Win	Loss	Save	Attendance	Record	GB
107	August 1	@ Athletics	3–8	Manaea (10–7)	Stroman (4–8)	—	17,058	48–59	26
108	August 2	@ Mariners	7–3	Hauschild (1–0)	Nicasio (1–6)	—	26,110	49–59	26
109	August 3	@ Mariners	7–2	Borucki (1–2)	Gonzales (12–6)	—	30,715	50–59	26
110	August 4	@ Mariners	5–1	Estrada (5–8)	Paxton (9–5)	—	41,238	51–59	26
111	August 5	@ Mariners	3–6	Duke (4–4)	Biagini (1–6)	Díaz (41)	40,515	51–60	27
112	August 7	Red Sox	7–10 (10)	Kimbrel (3–1)	Giles (0–3) (Note: 0–1 with Toronto)	—	31,855	51–61	28
113	August 8	Red Sox	5–10	Johnson (3–3)	Hauschild (1–1)	—	36,798	51–62	29
114	August 9	Red Sox	8–5	Borucki (2–2)	Porcello (14–5)	—	28,415	52–62	28
115	August 10	Rays	0–7	Snell (13–5)	Estrada (5–9)	—	23,082	52–63	29
116	August 11	Rays	1–3	Castillo (3–2)	Gaviglio (2–5)	Romo (15)	38,797	52–64	30½
117	August 12	Rays	2–1	García (3–6)	Alvarado (1–5)	Giles (13) (Note: 1 with Toronto)	33,746	53–64	30½
118	August 13	@ Royals	1–3	Kelley (5–5)	Reid-Foley (0–1)	Peralta (7)	14,721	53–65	31
119	August 14	@ Royals	6–5	Petricka (2–1)	Boyer (2–1)	Giles (14) (Note: 2 with Toronto)	13,680	54–65	31
120	August 15	@ Royals	6–5	Estrada (6–9)	López (0–2)	Giles (15) (Note: 3 with Toronto)	14,391	55–65	30
121	August 16	@ Royals	2–6	Flynn (3–3)	Gaviglio (2–6)	—	14,894	55–66	30½
122	August 17	@ Yankees	5–7 (7)	Green (6–2)	Biagini (1–7)	Robertson (3)	42,121	55–67	31½
123	August 18	@ Yankees	6–11	Severino (16–6)	Reid-Foley (0–2)	—	44,778	55–68	32½
124	August 19	@ Yankees	2–10	Happ (14–6)	Borucki (2–3)	—	43,176	55–69	32½
125	August 20	Orioles	5–3	Estrada (7–9)	Cashner (4–11)	Giles (16) (Note: 4 with Toronto)	25,031	56–69	31½
126	August 21	Orioles	8–2	Gaviglio (3–6)	Bundy (7–12)	—	25,855	57–69	30½
127	August 22	Orioles	6–0	Pannone (1–0)	Hess (2–8)	—	40,595	58–69	30½
128	August 24	Phillies	4–2	Borucki (3–3)	Arrieta (9–9)	Giles (17) (Note: 5 with Toronto)	26,292	59–69	30
129	August 25	Phillies	8–6	Biagini (2–7)	Domínguez (1–5)	Giles (18) (Note: 6 with Toronto)	33,127	60–69	29
130	August 26	Phillies	3–8	Velasquez (9–9)	Estrada (7–10)	—	28,209	60–70	29
131	August 27	@ Orioles	0–7	Hess (3–8)	Gaviglio (3–7)	—	15,436	60–71	29½
132	August 28	@ Orioles	5–12	Rogers (1–0)	Pannone (1–1)	—	11,762	60–72	30½
133	August 29	@ Orioles	5–10	Gilmartin (1–0)	Barnes (2–2)	Givens (5)	11,834	60–73	31½
134	August 31	@ Marlins	6–5	Biagini (3–7)	Steckenrider (4–4)	Giles (19) (Note: 7 with Toronto)	8,871	61–73	31

September: 12–16 (Home: 6–7; Road: 6–9)

#	Date	Opponent	Score	Win	Loss	Save	Attendance	Record	GB
135	September 1	@ Marlins	3–6	Chen (6–9)	Estrada (7–11)	—	11,174	61–74	32
136	September 2	@ Marlins	6–1	Reid-Foley (1–2)	Brigham (0–1)	—	9,617	62–74	31
137	September 3	Rays	1–7	Chirinos (3–5)	Stroman (4–9)	—	18,034	62–75	32
138	September 4	Rays	0–4	Wood (1–1)	Borucki (3–4)	Romo (19)	17,594	62–76	33
139	September 5	Rays	10–3	Sanchez (4–5)	Glasnow (1–5)	—	17,872	63–76	33
140	September 6	Indians	4–9	Bieber (9–3)	Gaviglio (3–8)	—	20,618	63–77	33½
141	September 7	Indians	3–2 (11)	Barnes (3–2)	Cimber (3–6)	—	26,830	64–77	32½
142	September 8	Indians	8–9	Tomlin (1–5)	Reid-Foley (1–3)	Allen (26)	35,353	64–78	32½
143	September 9	Indians	6–2	Pannone (2–1)	Clevinger (11–8)	Giles (20) (Note: 8 with Toronto)	31,184	65–78	32½
144	September 11	@ Red Sox	2–7	Brasier (2–0)	Tepera (5–5)	—	34,747	65–79	33½
145	September 12	@ Red Sox	0–1	Price (15–6)	Sanchez (4–6)	Kimbrel (39)	35,178	65–80	34½
146	September 13	@ Red Sox	3–4	Workman (5–0)	Barnes (3–3)	Kimbrel (40)	36,427	65–81	35½
147	September 14	@ Yankees	0–11	Tanaka (12–5)	Estrada (7–12)	Cessa (2)	40,138	65–82	35½
148	September 15	@ Yankees	8–7	Reid-Foley (2–3)	Sabathia (7–7)	Giles (21) (Note: 9 with Toronto)	43,130	66–82	35½
149	September 16	@ Yankees	3–2	Pannone (3–1)	Betances (4–6)	Giles (22) (Note: 10 with Toronto)	41,758	67–82	35½
150	September 17	@ Orioles	5–0	Borucki (4–4)	Phillips (0–1)	—	8,198	68–82	35
151	September 18	@ Orioles	6–4	Petricka (3–1)	Bundy (8–15)	Giles (23) (Note: 11 with Toronto)	9,096	69–82	34
152	September 19	@ Orioles	1–2	Wright (3–2)	Estrada (7–13)	Givens (7)	11,337	69–83	34
153	September 20	Rays	9–8	Paulino (1–0)	Romo (3–4)	—	19,478	70–83	34
154	September 21	Rays	3–11	Beeks (5–1)	Reid-Foley (2–4)	Pruitt (3)	21,167	70–84	35
155	September 22	Rays	5–2	Pannone (4–1)	Glasnow (2–7)	Giles (24) (Note: 12 with Toronto)	27,648	71–84	34
156	September 23	Rays	2–5	Snell (21–5)	Borucki (4–5)	Romo (23)	23,944	71–85	34
157	September 24	Astros	3–5	Keuchel (12–11)	Estrada (7–14)	Osuna (19)	23,463	71–86	35
158	September 25	Astros	1–4	James (2–0)	Gaviglio (3–9)	Osuna (20)	28,440	71–87	35½
159	September 26	Astros	3–1	Biagini (4–7)	Devenski (2–3)	Giles (25) (Note: 13 with Toronto)	22,828	72–87	35
160	September 28	@ Rays	7–6	Mayza (2–0)	Alvarado (1–6)	Giles (26) (Note: 14 with Toronto)	12,061	73–87	34
161	September 29	@ Rays	3–4	Castillo (4–2)	Borucki (4–6)	Romo (25)	13,221	73–88	34
162	September 30	@ Rays	4–9	Yarbrough (16–6)	Gaviglio (3–10)	Pruitt (4)	13,313	73–89	35

== Roster ==
2018 Toronto Blue Jays
Roster
Pitchers: 77 John Axford; 24 Danny Barnes; 31 Joe Biagini; 56 Ryan Borucki; 36 Tyler Clippard; 59 Rhiner Cruz; 47 Brandon Cumpton; 46 Oliver Drake; 25 Marco Estrada; 50 José Fernández; 57 Jaime García; 43 Sam Gaviglio; 51 Ken Giles; 65 Taylor Guerrieri; 49 Preston Guilmet; 33 J. A. Happ; 44 Mike Hauschild; 62 Mark Leiter; 62 Aaron Loup; 58 Tim Mayza; 48 Deck McGuire; 22 Seung-hwan Oh; 54 Roberto Osuna; 45 Thomas Pannone; 22 David Paulino; 39 Jake Petricka; 38 Carlos Ramírez; 54 Sean Reid-Foley; 47 Chris Rowley; 41 Aaron Sanchez; 71 Luis Santos; 66 Justin Shafer; 64 Murphy Smith; 6 Marcus Stroman; 52 Ryan Tepera	Catchers: 9 Danny Jansen; 21 Luke Maile; 55 Russell Martin; 70 Reese McGuire; Infielders: 64 Jon Berti; 1 Aledmys Díaz; 20 Josh Donaldson; 10 Brandon Drury; 13 Lourdes Gurriel Jr.; 8 Kendrys Morales; 61 Gift Ngoepe; 14 Justin Smoak; 26 Yangervis Solarte; 68 Rowdy Tellez; 29 Devon Travis; 7 Richard Ureña; 3 Gio Urshela	Outfielders: 30 Anthony Alford; 67 Jonathan Davis; 18 Curtis Granderson; 15 Randal Grichuk; 37 Teoscar Hernández; 28 Billy McKinney; 28 Steve Pearce; 11 Kevin Pillar; 23 Dalton Pompey; 27 Dwight Smith Jr.; 38 Darnell Sweeney	Manager: 5 John Gibbons; Coaches: 60 Alex Andreopoulos (bullpen catcher); 16 DeMarlo Hale (bench); 17 Brook Jacoby (hitting); 35 Dane Johnson (bullpen); 34 Tim Leiper (first base); 53 Mike Mordecai (quality control); 63 Jason Phillips (bullpen catcher); 4 Luis Rivera (third base); 40 Pete Walker (pitching)

== Statistics ==
=== Batting ===
Note: G = Games played; AB = At bats; R = Runs scored; H = Hits; 2B = Doubles; 3B = Triples; HR = Home runs; RBI = Runs batted in; SB = Stolen bases; BB = Walks; AVG = Batting average; Ref. = Reference

Player	G	AB	R	H	2B	3B	HR	RBI	SB	BB	AVG	Ref.
Anthony Alford	13	19	3	2	0	0	0	1	1	2	.105	
Jon Berti	4	15	2	4	1	1	0	2	1	0	.267	
Jonathan Davis	20	25	3	5	1	0	0	0	3	1	.200	
Aledmys Díaz	130	422	54	111	26	0	18	55	3	23	.263	
Josh Donaldson	36	137	22	32	11	0	5	16	2	21	.234	
Brandon Drury	8	26	3	4	2	0	0	3	0	2	.154	
Marco Estrada	27	1	0	0	0	0	0	0	0	0	.000	
Jaime García	25	4	0	0	0	0	0	0	0	0	.000	
Sam Gaviglio	26	3	0	1	1	0	0	0	0	0	.333	
Curtis Granderson	104	302	48	74	21	1	11	35	2	42	.245	
Randal Grichuk	124	424	60	104	32	1	25	61	3	26	.245	
Lourdes Gurriel Jr.	65	249	30	70	8	0	11	35	1	9	.281	
J. A. Happ	19	6	2	2	0	0	0	0	0	1	.333	
Teoscar Hernández	134	476	67	114	29	7	22	57	5	40	.239	
Danny Jansen	31	81	12	20	6	0	3	8	0	9	.247	
Luke Maile	68	202	22	50	13	1	3	27	2	25	.248	
Russell Martin	90	289	36	56	8	0	10	25	0	56	.194	
Deck McGuire	4	1	0	1	0	0	0	0	0	0	1.000	
Reese McGuire	14	31	5	9	3	0	2	4	1	2	.290	
Billy McKinney	36	115	14	29	7	0	6	13	1	11	.252	
Kendrys Morales	130	414	47	103	15	0	21	57	2	50	.249	
Gift Ngoepe	13	18	2	1	0	0	0	0	0	1	.056	
Steve Pearce	25	74	16	22	6	0	4	16	0	7	.291	
Jake Petricka	41	1	0	0	0	0	0	0	0	0	.000	
Kevin Pillar	142	513	64	129	40	2	15	59	14	17	.252	
Dalton Pompey	5	10	0	2	0	0	0	0	0	1	.200	
Sean Reid-Foley	7	3	0	0	0	0	0	0	0	0	.000	
Aaron Sanchez	20	1	0	0	0	0	0	0	0	0	.000	
Dwight Smith Jr.	35	65	9	17	8	0	2	8	0	7	.262	
Justin Smoak	146	502	67	122	34	0	25	76	0	81	.242	
Yangervis Solarte	122	468	50	106	20	0	17	54	1	31	.226	
Marcus Stroman	19	3	0	1	0	0	0	0	0	0	.333	
Darnell Sweeney	2	2	0	0	0	0	0	0	0	2	.000	
Rowdy Tellez	23	70	9	22	9	0	4	14	0	2	.314	
Devon Travis	103	358	41	83	14	3	11	44	3	16	.232	
Richard Ureña	40	99	10	29	4	0	1	6	2	7	.293	
Gio Urshela	19	43	7	10	1	0	1	3	0	2	.233	
Team totals	162	5477	709	1336	320	16	217	680	47	499	.244	

=== Pitching ===
Note: G = Games pitched; GS = Games started; W = Wins; L = Losses; SV = Saves; ERA = Earned run average; WHIP = Walks + hits per inning pitched; IP = Innings pitched; H = Hits allowed; R = Total runs allowed; ER = Earned runs allowed; W = Walks allowed; K = Strikeouts; Ref. = Reference

Player	G	GS	W	L	SV	ERA	WHIP	IP	H	R	ER	BB	K	Ref.
John Axford	45	1	4	1	0	4.41	1.24	51	43	27	24	20	50	
Danny Barnes	47	0	3	3	0	5.71	1.68	41	47	28	26	22	38	
Joe Biagini	50	4	4	7	0	6.00	1.67	72	96	50	48	24	53	
Ryan Borucki	17	17	4	6	0	3.87	1.32	97 2/3	96	48	42	33	67	
Tyler Clippard	73	1	4	3	7	3.67	1.17	68 2/3	57	29	28	23	85	
Rhiner Cruz	2	0	0	0	0	2.70	1.50	3 1/3	3	1	1	2	4	
Brandon Cumpton	1	0	0	0	0	5.40	3.00	1 2/3	3	1	1	2	2	
Oliver Drake	2	0	0	0	0	16.20	2.40	1 2/3	4	3	3	0	2	
Marco Estrada	28	28	7	14	0	5.64	1.43	143 1/3	154	91	90	51	103	
José Fernández	13	0	0	0	0	6.10	1.35	10 1/3	10	7	7	4	6	
Jaime García	25	13	3	6	0	5.93	1.55	74 1/3	77	52	50	38	69	
Sam Gaviglio	26	24	3	10	0	5.31	1.44	123 2/3	140	77	71	38	106	
Ken Giles	21	0	0	1	14	4.12	1.12	19 2/3	18	11	9	4	22	
Taylor Guerrieri	9	0	0	0	0	4.66	1.34	9 2/3	9	5	5	4	8	
Preston Guilmet	6	0	0	0	0	9.00	1.88	8	11	8	8	4	5	
J. A. Happ	20	20	10	6	0	4.18	1.18	114	99	61	53	35	130	
Mike Hauschild	2	0	1	1	0	4.32	1.32	8 1/3	7	4	4	4	5	
Mark Leiter Jr.	8	0	0	0	0	13.50	2.55	6 2/3	13	11	10	4	9	
Aaron Loup	50	0	0	0	0	4.54	1.60	35 2/3	44	21	18	13	42	
Tim Mayza	37	0	2	0	0	3.28	1.31	35 2/3	33	13	13	14	38	
Deck McGuire	4	0	0	0	0	6.48	1.68	8 1/3	9	6	6	5	7	
Kendrys Morales	1	0	0	0	0	0.00	1.00	1	0	0	0	1	0	
Seung-hwan Oh	48	0	4	3	2	2.68	1.00	47	37	14	14	10	55	
Roberto Osuna	15	0	0	0	9	2.93	1.11	15 1/3	16	5	5	1	13	
Thomas Pannone	12	6	4	1	0	4.19	1.21	43	37	20	20	15	29	
David Paulino	7	0	1	0	0	1.35	1.20	6 2/3	6	2	1	2	6	
Jake Petricka	41	0	3	1	0	4.53	1.64	45 2/3	59	28	23	16	41	
Carlos Ramírez	2	0	0	0	0	3.86	2.57	2 1/3	1	1	1	5	3	
Sean Reid-Foley	7	7	2	4	0	5.13	1.56	33 1/3	31	23	19	21	40	
Chris Rowley	2	0	0	1	0	40.50	4.50	2/3	2	4	3	1	0	
Aaron Sanchez	20	20	4	6	0	4.89	1.57	105	106	62	57	59	86	
Luis Santos	15	1	1	1	0	7.20	1.80	20	26	16	16	10	24	
Justin Shafer	6	0	0	0	0	3.24	1.56	8 1/3	6	4	3	7	2	
Murphy Smith	3	0	0	0	0	8.10	1.80	3 1/3	5	3	3	1	0	
Marcus Stroman	19	19	4	9	0	5.54	1.48	102 1/3	115	68	63	36	78	
Ryan Tepera	68	0	5	5	7	3.62	1.21	64 2/3	54	27	26	24	68	
Team totals	162	162	73	89	39	4.85	1.41	1433 2/3	1476	832	772	551	1298	

== Awards ==
Recipient	Award	Date awarded	Ref.
Justin Smoak	American League Player of the Week	April 2	
J. A. Happ	All-Star	July 8	
Lourdes Gurriel Jr.	American League Rookie of the Month (July)	August 3	
Kendrys Morales	American League Player of the Week	August 27	

== Transactions ==
=== March ===
- On March 29, designated Sam Moll for assignment, placed Anthony Alford and Dalton Pompey on the 10-day disabled list, placed Troy Tulowitzki on the 60-day disabled list, optioned Joe Biagini, Tim Mayza, and Teoscar Hernández to Triple-A Buffalo, and selected the contracts of John Axford and Tyler Clippard.
- On March 31, outrighted Sam Moll to Triple-A Buffalo.

=== April ===
- On April 9, sent Anthony Alford on a rehab assignment to the Advanced-A Dunedin Blue Jays.
- On April 10, placed Kendrys Morales on the 10-day disabled list, and recalled Tim Mayza.
- On April 13, placed Josh Donaldson on the 10-day disabled list, and recalled Teoscar Hernández.
- On April 17, recalled Joe Biagini.
- On April 18, optioned Joe Biagini.
- On April 20, optioned Tim Mayza and Gift Ngoepe, recalled Lourdes Gurriel Jr., and activated Kendrys Morales.
- On April 21, traded Jon Berti to the Cleveland Indians for cash considerations.
- On April 23, placed John Axford on the bereavement list and recalled Tim Mayza.
- On April 27, activated John Axford and optioned Tim Mayza.
- On April 28, sent Josh Donaldson on a rehab assignment to the Advanced-A Dunedin Blue Jays.
- On April 29, optioned Devon Travis and recalled Carlos Ramírez.
- On April 30, placed Randal Grichuk on the 10-day disabled list, and recalled Gift Ngoepe.

=== May ===
- On May 3, activated Josh Donaldson, placed Justin Smoak on the paternity list, optioned Gift Ngoepe, and recalled Dwight Smith Jr. and Tim Mayza. After the first game of the doubleheader, the Blue Jays optioned Danny Barnes, placed Steve Pearce on the 10-day disabled list, recalled Joe Biagini, and selected the contract of Luis Santos.
- On May 4, designated Luis Santos for assignment, optioned Joe Biagini, Carlos Ramírez, and Dwight Smith Jr., recalled Dalton Pompey and Richard Ureña, and selected the contract of Jake Petricka.
- On May 5, optioned Jake Petricka and recalled Anthony Alford.
- On May 8, placed Roberto Osuna on the restricted list, placed Aledmys Díaz on the 10-day disabled list, and recalled Richard Ureña and Jake Petricka.
- On May 9, acquired Gio Urshela from the Cleveland Indians for cash considerations or a player to be named later.
- On May 11, placed Marcus Stroman on the 10-day disabled list, optioned Tim Mayza, and recalled Joe Biagini and Sam Gaviglio.
- On May 12, optioned Dalton Pompey and recalled Gio Urshela.
- On May 13, optioned Lourdes Gurriel Jr., designated Carlos Ramírez for assignment, and selected the contract of Deck McGuire.
- On May 14, optioned Anthony Alford.
- On May 15, recalled Dwight Smith Jr.
- On May 16, optioned Deck McGuire and recalled Danny Barnes.
- On May 18, placed Jaime García on the 10-day disabled list and recalled Deck McGuire.
- On May 21, optioned Richard Ureña and sent Randal Grichuk on a rehab assignment to the Advanced-A Dunedin Blue Jays.
- On May 22, recalled Devon Travis.
- On May 24, optioned Deck McGuire.
- On May 25, recalled Dalton Pompey.
- On May 26, activated Jaime García and optioned Dalton Pompey.
- On May 27, sent Randal Grichuk on a rehab assignment to the Double-A New Hampshire Fisher Cats.
- On May 29, sent Aledmys Díaz on a rehab assignment to the Double-A New Hampshire Fisher Cats.
- On May 30, sent Randal Grichuk on a rehab assignment to the Triple-A Buffalo Bisons.

=== June ===
- On June 1, placed Josh Donaldson on the 10-day disabled list, optioned Dwight Smith Jr. and Jake Petricka, activated Aledmys Díaz and Randal Grichuk, and recalled Tim Mayza.
- On June 9, designated Deck McGuire for assignment and claimed Preston Guilmet off waivers from the St. Louis Cardinals.
- On June 11, optioned Tim Mayza and recalled Preston Guilmet.
- On June 13, sent Marcus Stroman on a rehab assignment to the Advanced-A Dunedin Blue Jays.
- On June 16, sent Steve Pearce on a rehab assignment to the Triple-A Buffalo Bisons.
- On June 19, placed Sam Gaviglio on the paternity list and recalled Lourdes Gurriel Jr.
- On June 22, placed Danny Barnes on the 10-day disabled list, activated Sam Gaviglio and Steve Pearce, and optioned Lourdes Gurriel Jr.
- On June 23, placed Aaron Sanchez and Jaime García on the 10-day disabled list, activated Marcus Stroman, and recalled Tim Mayza.
- On June 26, designated Gio Urshela for assignment, and recalled Ryan Borucki.
- On June 28, traded Steve Pearce and cash considerations to the Boston Red Sox for Santiago Espinal.
- On June 29, selected the contract of Darnell Sweeney.
- On June 30, placed Ryan Tepera on the 10-day disabled list and recalled Jake Petricka.

=== July ===
- On July 2, optioned Darnell Sweeney and recalled Lourdes Gurriel Jr.
- On July 3, outrighted Gio Urshela to Triple-A Buffalo.
- On July 4, optioned Tim Mayza, designated Preston Guilmet for assignment, and selected the contracts of Rhiner Cruz and Luis Santos.
- On July 5, outrighted Darnell Sweeney to Triple-A Buffalo.
- On July 6, outrighted Preston Guilmet to Triple-A Buffalo.
- On July 8, placed Rhiner Cruz on the 10-day disabled list and recalled Tim Mayza.
- On July 12, sent Jaime García on a rehab assignment to the Advanced-A Dunedin Blue Jays.
- On July 13, placed Marco Estrada on the 10-day disabled list and recalled Dwight Smith Jr.
- On July 14, optioned Ryan Borucki, transferred Rhiner Cruz to the 60-day disabled list, and selected the contract of Chris Rowley.
- On July 15, placed Kevin Pillar on the 10-day disabled list, placed Lourdes Gurriel Jr. on the 7-day concussion disabled list, and activated Jaime García and Ryan Tepera.
- On July 16, optioned Chris Rowley.
- On July 20, recalled Richard Ureña.
- On July 22, activated Lourdes Gurriel Jr. and optioned Richard Ureña.
- On July 24, sent Danny Barnes on a rehab assignment to the Rookie-level Gulf Coast League Blue Jays, recalled Ryan Borucki, and optioned Tim Mayza.
- On July 26, claimed Oliver Drake, and traded Seung-hwan Oh to the Colorado Rockies for Chad Spanberger and Forrest Wall, and J. A. Happ to the New York Yankees for Brandon Drury and Billy McKinney.
- On July 27, activated Brandon Drury.
- On July 28, optioned Billy McKinney.
- On July 30, designated Oliver Drake for assignment, activated Marco Estrada, transferred Josh Donaldson to the 60-day disabled list, and traded Roberto Osuna to the Houston Astros for Ken Giles, Hector Perez, and David Paulino.
- On July 31, traded Aaron Loup to the Philadelphia Phillies for Jacob Waguespack, traded John Axford to the Los Angeles Dodgers for Corey Copping, and selected the contracts of Brandon Cumpton and Darnell Sweeney.

=== August ===
- On August 1, placed Lourdes Gurriel Jr. on the 10-day disabled list and activated Danny Barnes.
- On August 2, designated Darnell Sweeney for assignment, optioned Dwight Smith Jr., activated Ken Giles, and signed Mike Hauschild.
- On August 3, activated Kevin Pillar and optioned Brandon Cumpton.
- On August 4, traded Gio Urshela to the New York Yankees for cash considerations.
- On August 5, outrighted Darnell Sweeney to Triple-A Buffalo.
- On August 7, placed Brandon Drury on the 10-day disabled list and recalled Richard Ureña.
- On August 9, sent Aaron Sanchez on a rehab assignment to the Rookie-level Gulf Coast League Blue Jays, optioned Mike Hauschild, and recalled Thomas Pannone.
- On August 12, placed Yangervis Solarte on the 10-day disabled list, and recalled Danny Jansen.
- On August 13, designated Brandon Cumpton for assignment, optioned Danny Barnes, and selected the contract of Sean Reid-Foley.
- On August 14, acquired Bryan Baker from the Colorado Rockies as the player to be named later from the Seung-hwan Oh trade.
- On August 15, sent Aaron Sanchez on a rehab assignment to the Advanced-A Dunedin Blue Jays, optioned Thomas Pannone, and recalled Tim Mayza.
- On August 16, outrighted Brandon Cumpton.
- On August 17, placed Luke Maile on the paternity list and recalled Billy McKinney.
- On August 18, sent Lourdes Gurriel Jr. on a rehab assignment to the Double-A New Hampshire Fisher Cats.
- On August 19, placed Marcus Stroman on the 10-day disabled list, transferred Aaron Sanchez to the 60-day disabled list, optioned Luis Santos, recalled Thomas Pannone, and selected the contract of Justin Shafer.
- On August 20, activated Luke Maile, optioned Sean Reid-Foley, and sent Aaron Sanchez on a rehab assignment to the Double-A New Hampshire Fisher Cats.
- On August 21, sent Lourdes Gurriel Jr. on a rehab assignment to the Triple-A Buffalo Bisons.
- On August 24, activated Lourdes Gurriel Jr. and optioned Richard Ureña.
- On August 25, activated Aaron Sanchez and designated Jaime García for assignment.
- On August 27, designated Luis Santos for assignment, optioned Jake Petricka and Justin Shafer, recalled Danny Barnes, and selected the contract of Murphy Smith.
- On August 28, sent Josh Donaldson on a rehab assignment to Advanced-A Dunedin Blue Jays.
- On August 29, released Jaime García.
- On August 31, outrighted Luis Santos to Triple-A Buffalo, traded Josh Donaldson to the Cleveland Indians for a player to be named later (later revealed to be Julian Merryweather), and traded Curtis Granderson to the Milwaukee Brewers for Demi Orimoloye.

=== September ===
- On September 1, designated Murphy Smith for assignment, claimed Mark Leiter Jr. off waivers from the Philadelphia Phillies, and recalled José Fernández, Taylor Guerrieri, and Sean Reid-Foley.
- On September 3, activated Marcus Stroman and Mark Leiter Jr., and outrighted Murphy Smith to Triple-A Buffalo.
- On September 4, designated Mike Hauschild for assignment, placed Joe Biagini on the 10-day disabled list, selected the contract of Jonathan Davis, and recalled Jake Petricka, Dwight Smith Jr., Rowdy Tellez, and Richard Ureña.
- On September 5, recalled David Paulino.
- On September 6, recalled Reese McGuire and Justin Shafer.
- On September 7, outrighted Mike Hauschild to Triple-A Buffalo.
- On September 9, activated Yangervis Solarte.
- On September 11, placed Russell Martin on the paternity list.
- On September 14, activated Joe Biagini and Russell Martin.
- On September 17, recalled Anthony Alford.
- On September 26, transferred Brandon Drury to the 60-day disabled list, and selected the contract of Jon Berti.

=== October ===
- On October 1, recalled Dalton Pompey.
- On October 5, acquired Julian Merryweather from the Cleveland Indians as the player to be named later from the Josh Donaldson trade, and designated Jon Berti for assignment.

== Farm system ==
(Updated to games played September 14, 2018)

Level	Team	League	Manager	Win–loss record	Position	Postseason	Ref.
Triple-A	Buffalo Bisons	International League	Bob Meacham	61–77	North Division; 6th place 22 GB	Did not qualify	
Double-A	New Hampshire Fisher Cats	Eastern League	John Schneider	76–62	East Division; 2nd place 2 GB	Qualified won SF 3–0 won F 3–0	
Advanced-A	Dunedin Blue Jays	Florida State League	Casey Candaele	31–37 (first half); 38–31 (second half)	North Division; 5th place (first half); 7 GB; 3rd place(second half); 7 GB	Did not qualify	
Class-A	Lansing Lugnuts	Midwest League	Cesar Martin	43–27 (first half); 37–33 (second half)	East Division; 2nd place (first half); 4½ GB; 2nd place (second half); 6 GB	Qualified lost QF 0–2	
Short Season-A	Vancouver Canadians	Northwest League	Dallas McPherson	19–19 (first half); 21–17 (second half)	North Division; 2nd place (first half); 1 GB; 2nd place (second half); 1 GB	Did not qualify	
Rookie Advanced	Bluefield Blue Jays	Appalachian League	Dennis Holmberg	42–26	East Division; 2nd place 3 GB	Qualified lost SF 1–2	
Rookie	GCL Blue Jays	Gulf Coast League	Luis Hurtado	24–29	Northwest Division; 5th place 13 GB	Did not qualify	
Rookie	DSL Blue Jays	Dominican Summer League	John Tamargo Jr.	41–31	Baseball City Division; 2nd place 7 GB	Did not qualify	
