= José Fernández (left-handed pitcher) =

Dominican baseball pitcher (born 1993)

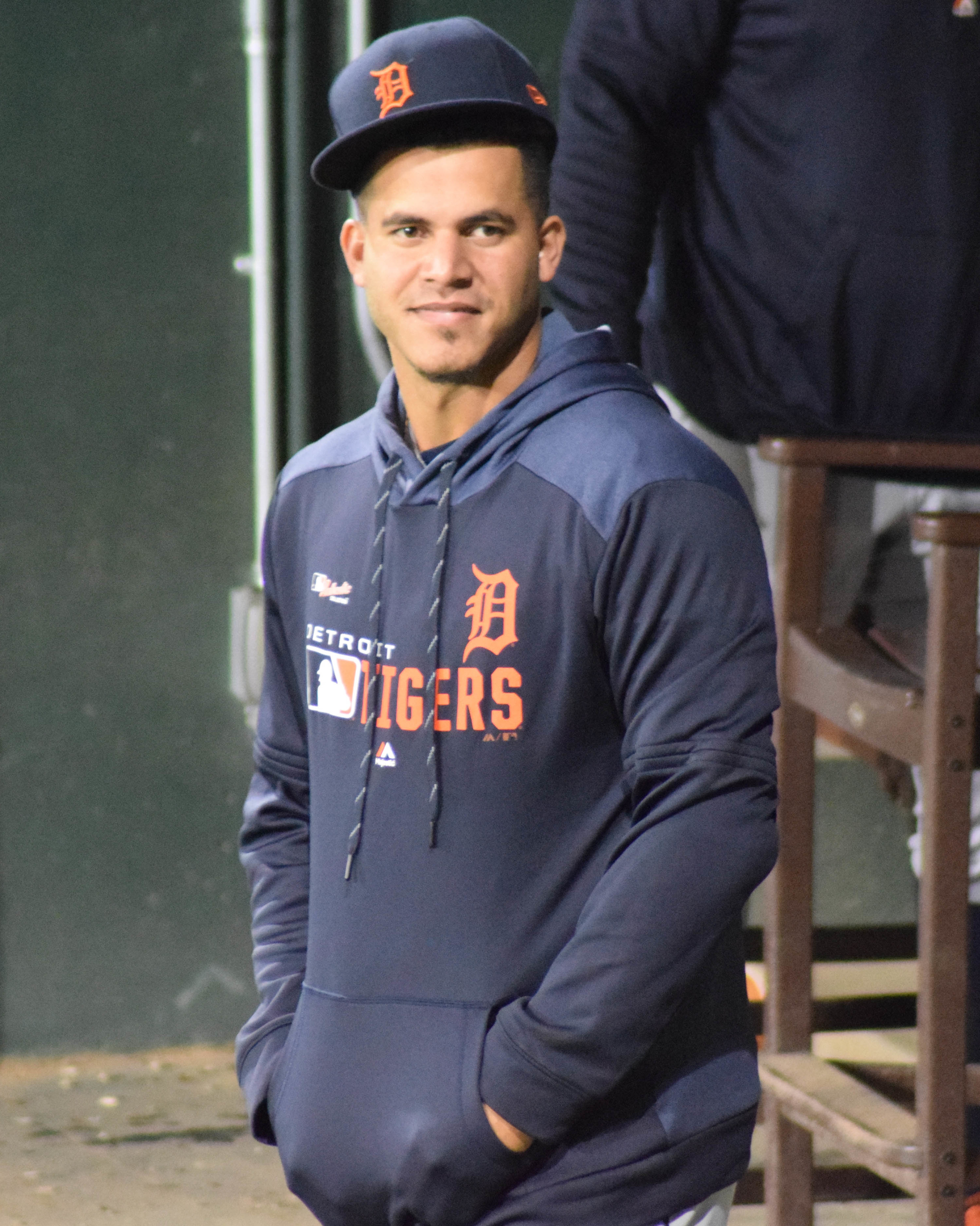
- Fernández with the Detroit Tigers in 2019

Free agent
- Pitcher
- Born: February 13, 1993 (age 33); Mao, Dominican Republic
- Bats: Left Throws: Left

MLB debut
- September 1, 2018, for the Toronto Blue Jays

MLB statistics (through 2018 season)
- Win–loss record: 0–0
- Earned run average: 9.00
- Strikeouts: 8
- Stats at Baseball Reference

Teams
- Toronto Blue Jays (2018); Detroit Tigers (2019)

José Manuel Fernández (born February 13, 1993) is a Dominican professional baseball left-handed pitcher who is a free agent. He has previously played in Major League Baseball (MLB) for the Toronto Blue Jays and Detroit Tigers.

== Professional career ==
=== Toronto Blue Jays ===
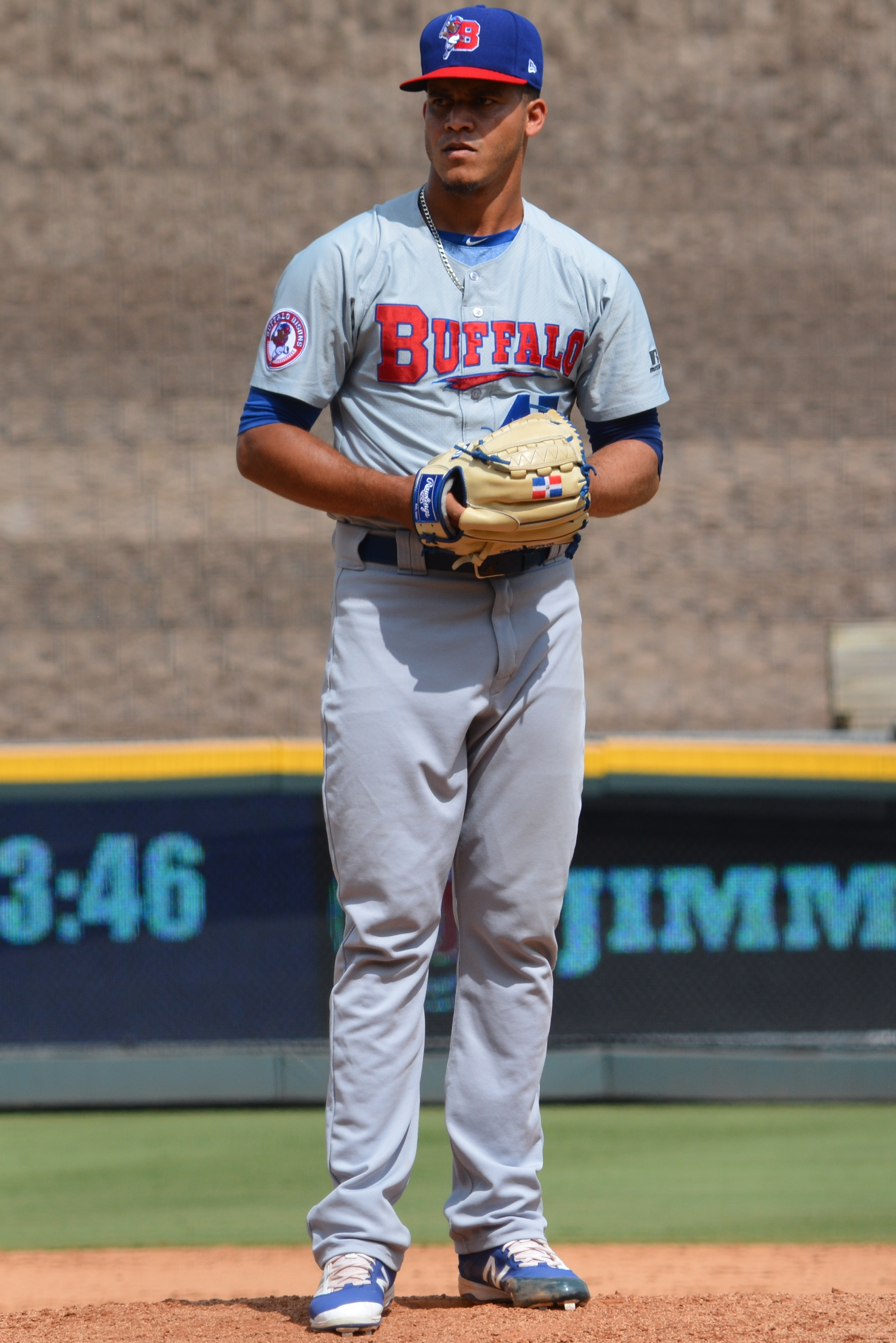
Fernández with the Buffalo Bisons in 2018

Fernández signed as an international free agent with the Toronto Blue Jays on January 5, 2012, and was assigned to the Dominican Summer League Blue Jays in July. In nine games, he posted a 2–0 win–loss record, 1.52 earned run average, and 34 strikeouts in 29 2/3 innings pitched. In 2013, Fernández made 16 relief appearances for the Rookie-level Gulf Coast League Blue Jays, and went 1–0 with a 2.70 ERA and 13 strikeouts. He played the entire 2014 season with the Low-A Vancouver Canadians, going 1–1 with a 4.01 ERA and 24 strikeouts in 24 2/3 innings. Fernández continued to rise through the Blue Jays minor league system, spending all of 2015 with the Single-A Lansing Lugnuts. In 35 games, he pitched to a 1–2 record, 3.31 ERA, and 41 strikeouts in 51 2/3 innings. Fernández struggled with his command in 2016 while with the High-A Dunedin Blue Jays, walking 34 batters in 43 2/3 innings. He ended the year with a 1–1 record, 4.12 ERA, and 41 strikeouts. In the offseason, Fernández appeared in 13 games for the Estrellas de Oriente of the Dominican Winter League, and posted a 2.70 ERA and 13 strikeouts.

Fernández was assigned to the Double-A New Hampshire Fisher Cats for the 2017 season, and pitched to a 1–2 record, 5.44 ERA, and 48 strikeouts in 46 1/3 innings. He returned to the Estrellas de Oriente in the offseason, appearing in 12 games. Heading into the 2018 season, Fernández was invited to spring training by the Blue Jays. He was assigned to New Hampshire to begin the year, and was promoted to the Triple-A Buffalo Bisons in late June. In 60 2/3 combined innings, Fernández went 4–3 with a 2.97 ERA and 65 strikeouts.

Fernández was called up to the majors for the first time on September 1, 2018, as a September call-up. During the 2018 season, he allowed seven runs on 10 hits over 10 1/3 innings in 13 appearances while walking four and striking out six.

=== Detroit Tigers ===
Fernández was claimed off waivers by the Detroit Tigers on November 2, 2018. In 4 appearances for Detroit, he struggled to a 17.18 ERA with 2 strikeouts over 3 2/3 innings. On July 3, 2019, Fernández was designated for assignment by the Tigers. He spent the remainder of the year with the Double–A Erie SeaWolves and Triple–A Toledo Mud Hens. Fernández became a minor league free agent on November 4.

=== Atlanta Braves ===
On February 24, 2020, Fernández signed a minor league contract with the Atlanta Braves. Fernández did not play in a game in 2020 due to the cancellation of the minor league season because of the COVID-19 pandemic. He was released by the Braves organization on May 28.

=== Hamilton Cardinals ===
On April 2, 2022, Fernández signed with the Hamilton Cardinals of the Intercounty Baseball League. In 10 games, he posted a stellar 0.60 ERA with 30 strikeouts and 2 saves in 15.0 innings pitched.

Fernández was released by the team on June 25, 2023.

=== Pericos de Puebla ===
On October 5, 2023, Fernández signed with the Pericos de Puebla of the Mexican League. In 20 appearances for Puebla in 2024, Fernández recorded a 6.00 ERA with nine strikeouts over 15 innings of work.

=== Charros de Jalisco ===
On June 13, 2024, Fernández was traded to the Charros de Jalisco of the Mexican League. He made 14 appearances for Jalisco down the stretch, logging an 0–1 record and 4.35 ERA with eight strikeouts across 10 1/3 innings pitched.

Fernández made 16 appearances for Jalisco in 2025, registering a 2–1 record and 6.91 ERA with 12 strikeouts across 14 1/3 innings pitched.

=== Olmecas de Tabasco ===
On July 1, 2025, Fernández was traded to the Olmecas de Tabasco of the Mexican League in exchange for Carlos Francisco. In 19 relief appearances, he posted an 0–4 record with a 5.51 ERA and 15 strikeouts over 16 1/3 innings pitched. On January 28, 2026, Fernández was released by the Olmecas.
