= Aledmys Díaz =

Cuban baseball player (born 1990)

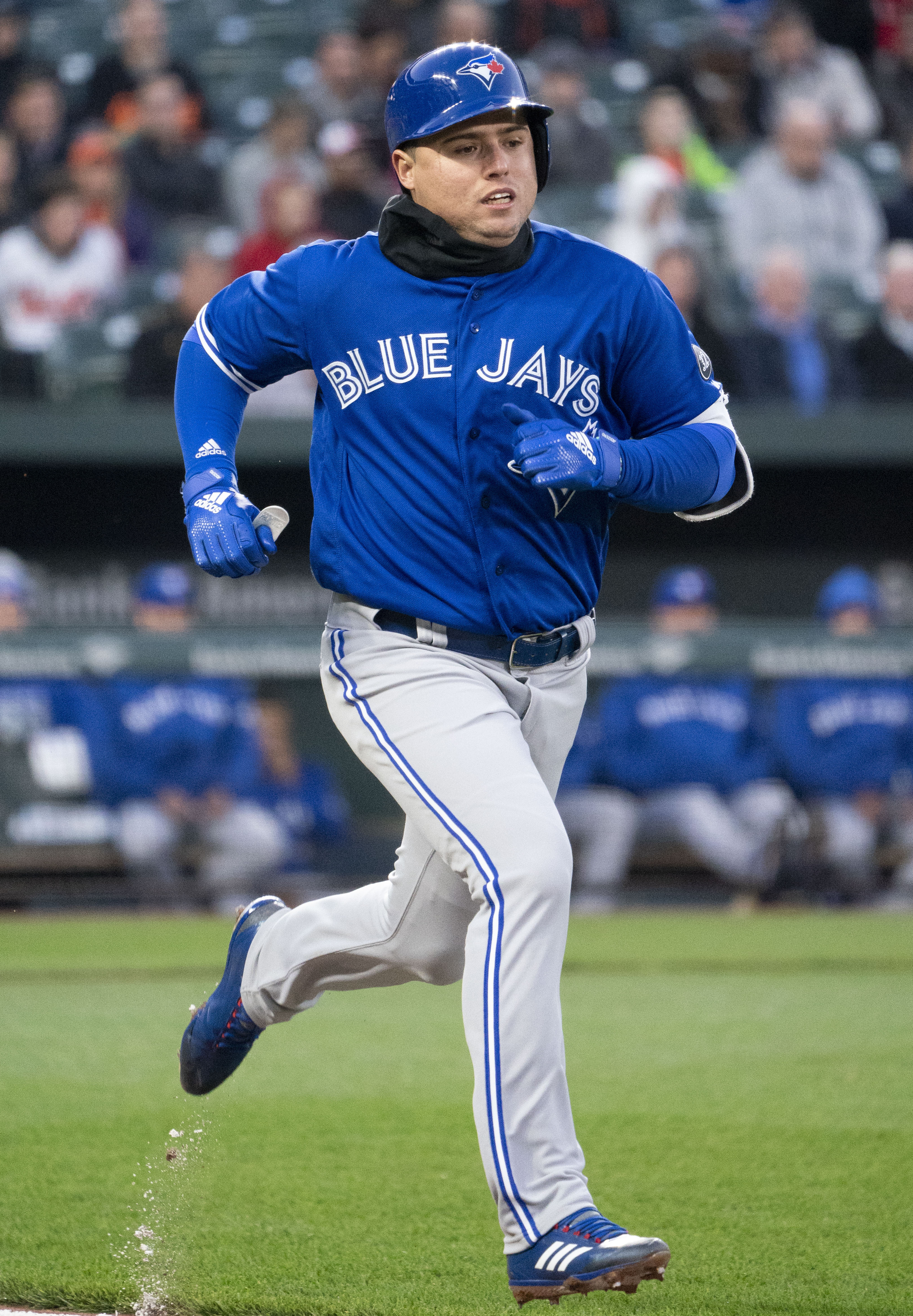
- Díaz with the Toronto Blue Jays in 2018

Free agent
- Utility player
- Born: August 1, 1990 (age 36); Santa Clara, Cuba
- Bats: Right Throws: Right

MLB debut
- April 5, 2016, for the St. Louis Cardinals

MLB statistics (through 2024 season)
- Batting average: .259
- Home runs: 78
- Runs batted in: 294
- Stats at Baseball Reference

Teams
- St. Louis Cardinals (2016–2017); Toronto Blue Jays (2018); Houston Astros (2019–2022); Oakland Athletics (2023–2024); Houston Astros (2024)

Career highlights and awards
- All-Star (2016); World Series champion (2022)

Aledmys Díaz Serrano (born August 1, 1990) is a Cuban professional baseball utility player who is a free agent. He has previously played in Major League Baseball (MLB) for the St. Louis Cardinals, Toronto Blue Jays, Houston Astros, and Oakland Athletics. He played for the Naranjas de Villa Clara in the Cuban National Series from 2007 through 2012, before defecting to the United States. Díaz signed with the Cardinals in 2014, and made his MLB debut with them in 2016.

From Santa Clara, Cuba, Díaz' career accomplishments in the Cuban National Series from 2007 to 2012 included a .307 batting average, .397 on-base percentage (OBP), and .439 slugging percentage over 342 games. As a rookie in MLB in 2016, he became the first player in history to sustain a .500 batting average after 50 at bats, and was named an All-Star for the National League team. After losing his starting job in 2017, he spent the 2018 season with Toronto and was traded to Houston before the 2019 season. He won the 2022 World Series with the Astros.

== Early life ==
Serrano was born on August 1, 1990 in Santa Clara, Cuba. While growing up in Santa Clara, Díaz lived on the same street as, and was friends with, future Major League Baseball (MLB) pitcher José Fernández. They played for the same youth baseball team, and Díaz's father and uncle encouraged Fernández's mother to bring him to the ballpark. Fernández commented that had Díaz's uncle not been an influence early in his life, he would not have pursued a professional baseball career.

== Baseball career ==
=== Cuban National Series (2007–2012) ===
Díaz played in the Serie Nacional de Béisbol (Cuban National Series), the primary amateur baseball competition in Cuba, for the Naranjas de Villa Clara, based in Santa Clara. He debuted in the 2007–08 season by going nine for 32 in a utility role. At age 19 in 2008–09, Díaz batted .301 with a .403 on-base percentage (OBP) and .482 slugging percentage (SLG) but fielded only .930 as a regular infielder. He was third in the Serie Nacional with 24 errors.

The next season, Díaz batted .282 with a .348 OBP, .363 SLG and fielded .950 as Villa Clara's starting shortstop. He tied for fifth in the Serie Nacional with 18 errors, having improved his defense. During his 2011–12 season, Díaz' offensive production continued to climb, as he batted .315 with a .404 OBP and .500 SLG. He hit 12 home runs in 270 at bats. From 2008 to 2012, Díaz, batted .308 with a .401 OBP and .444 SLG.

In his Cuban National Series career, Díaz totaled 342 games, batting .307, .397 OBP, .439 SLG, 193 runs scored, 54 doubles, 27 home runs and 165 runs batted in (RBI) in 1125 at bats. He defected from Cuba in 2012 while playing with the Cuban national baseball team in a tournament in the Netherlands. He was declared ineligible to sign with any MLB teams until February 19, 2014, due to lying about his age. He spent the interim 18 months from defecting from Cuba playing in Mexico City.

=== Minor leagues (2014–2015) ===
To audition for a contract with MLB clubs, Díaz held a showcase with fellow Cuban defector Odrisamer Despaigne on February 13, 2014. Although Díaz was initially projected to command a major league contract with a similar level of pay to other Cuban defectors such as Alex Guerrero and Erisbel Arruebarrena, his performance in the showcase did not leave the impression that he merited such a level of salary, and, further, many clubs passed on him altogether. He had left Mexico City effectively out of shape to play professional baseball. He signed a four-year contract with the St. Louis Cardinals worth $8 million on March 9.

The Cardinals first assigned Díaz to the Palm Beach Cardinals of the High–A Florida State League in 2014, and he was promoted to the Springfield Cardinals of the Double–A Texas League that season. In 47 games between both teams, he batted .273/.324/.441 with five home runs, 24 RBIs, and seven stolen bases. In 2015, while playing for Springfield, he battled injuries before he was designated for assignment on July 8, 2015. While he had benefited from talent alone while playing in Cuba, his lack of preparation had caused his performance to suffer after playing the minor leagues. However, he diligently began to prepare more and proactively ask more questions.

In the last 45 games of the 2015 season after his removal from the 40-man roster, Díaz batted .333 with a .404 OBP and a .574 SLG. The Cardinals added him to the 40-man roster on November 19, 2015. Over the full 2015 campaign, Díaz batted .278/.339/.445 with 13 home runs and 52 RBI over 116 total games between Springfield and the Memphis Redbirds of the Triple–A Pacific Coast League. He batted .239 against right-handed pitchers, .371 against left-handers, .329 in road games and .222 in home games. He played in the Arizona Fall League following the regular season, registering a .616 SLG and .987 OPS.

=== St. Louis Cardinals (2016–2017) ===
==== All-Star rookie (2016) ====
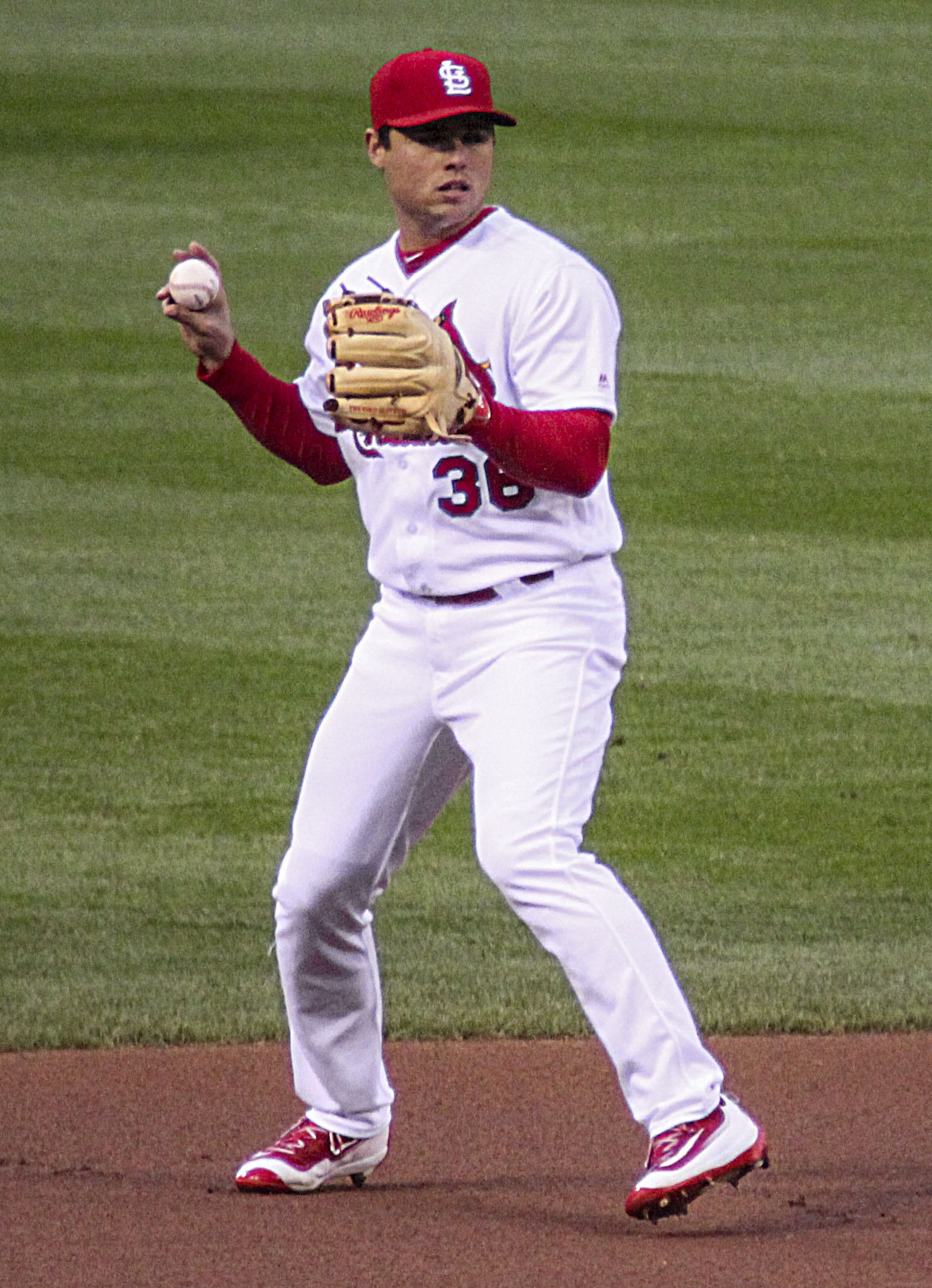
Díaz playing shortstop in 2016

Originally planning for Díaz to spend the 2016 season in Memphis, the Cardinals eventually moved three veteran players to accommodate him becoming the starting shortstop. On April 5, 2016, the Cardinals recalled him to the major league roster to take the place of outfielder Tommy Pham, who had departed on Opening Day two days earlier with an injury. Díaz debuted on the same day as his call-up. In his first major league at bat in the third inning against the Pittsburgh Pirates, he singled off Jon Niese for his first hit in a 6–5 loss. Initially, Díaz' presence on the roster gave the Cardinals a capable hitter with upside who could play shortstop and fill a void until the return of Rubén Tejada, who had injured himself late in spring training. Tejada himself was a replacement signed as a free agent during spring training to replace the already-established starting shortstop Jhonny Peralta, who also had injured himself and was projected to be unable to play significantly longer than Tejada.

On April 8, Díaz's first major league home run contributed to the Cardinals becoming the first team in major league history to hit three pinch hit home runs in the same game. Jeremy Hazelbaker and Greg Garcia were the other pinch hitters as the Cardinals defeated the Atlanta Braves, 7–4. The previous record of two pinch hit home runs by the same team in one game was previously accomplished on 57 occasions, most recently in 2011. Tejada was reinstated from the disabled list on April 18, However, Díaz's hitting had led the Cardinals to instead retain him as the starting shortstop, thus assigning Tejada to be a utility infielder.

In an 11–2 win over the San Diego Padres on April 23, Díaz garnered his first five-hit game. After collecting two hits in his first two at bats in a game against the Arizona Diamondbacks on April 25 to give him 26 hits in 52 at bats, he became the first rookie in MLB since 1900 to carry at least a .500 batting average at any point after accumulating 50 at bats, per the Elias Sports Bureau. Meanwhile, past defensive liabilities reemerged: in Díaz' first 31 games of the season, he committed nine errors. However, he garnered early attention for the National League (NL) Rookie of the Year Award; as of June 6, he was third in the NL in batting at .328 and had hit eight home runs with 30 RBIs. When Peralta returned from the disabled list on June 7, Díaz' sustained level of play convinced the Cardinals to displace Peralta to third base and third baseman Matt Carpenter to second base.

As the season progressed, Díaz' defense notably improved; in the remaining 51 games leading up to the All-Star break, he committed six errors. On July 7, he was selected to his first MLB All-Star Game to replace Carpenter, who had been injured two days earlier. Díaz appeared as a pinch hitter with the bases loaded against Will Harris in the eighth inning, and struck out looking as the American League defeated the National League, 4–2. On July 21 against Padres in a 5–5 game, Díaz batted against Carlos Villanueva with the bases loaded in the bottom of the ninth inning and, this time, singled home the game-winning run for his first career walk-off hit.

After sustaining a hairline fracture of his thumb during a game against Miami, the Cardinals placed Díaz on the DL on August 1. He missed all of August and the first two weeks of September.

Díaz hit his first major league grand slam on September 27, 2016, his first game back after the death of his childhood friend, José Fernández. Díaz was called back out for a curtain call, where he raised his helmet high towards the sky. He stated afterwards, "Every time I put on a uniform, I will think of him." Over his last 31 games of the season, he committed one error.

Díaz batted .300 in 111 games in his rookie year, with 121 hits, 28 doubles, 17 home runs, 69 RBIs, a .369 OBP, and a .510 SLG. He played 106 games at shortstop and was fourth in the league in errors with 16. In the 2016 NL Rookie of the Year voting, he placed fifth.

==== 2017 ====
On April 8, 2017, Díaz hit two home runs for his first MLB multi-home run game, with one of those home runs sticking to the "G" letter of the Big Mac Land sign at Busch Stadium. The Cardinals won 10–4 over the Cincinnati Reds. Diaz began the season with a .217 batting average, and improved in the month of May. The Cardinals optioned him to Memphis on June 28, after batting .260/.293/.396, seven home runs and 20 RBIs in 71 games. He eventually lost his role as the Cardinals' starting shortstop with the emergence of rookie Paul DeJong—who finished second in the NL Rookie of the Year balloting—as a powerful batter and capable fielder. In the final game of the 2017 season, Díaz tore his hamstring. In 2017 with the Cardinals he batted .259/.290/.392 in 286 at bats, while playing primarily shortstop.

=== Toronto Blue Jays (2018) ===
The Cardinals traded Díaz to the Toronto Blue Jays on December 1, 2017, for minor league outfielder J. B. Woodman. Díaz began the season as Toronto's starting shortstop with Troy Tulowitzki on the disabled list (DL). On May 8, Díaz was placed on the DL list with a left ankle sprain. To that point in the season, he had batted .216/.273/.431 with six home runs and 13 RBI over 110 plate appearances. He was activated on June 1. For the season, Díaz hit .263/.303/.453 with 18 home runs and 55 RBIs in 422 at bats in 130 games while playing primarily shortstop.

=== Houston Astros (2019–2022) ===
==== 2019–2021 ====
On November 17, 2018, the Blue Jays traded Díaz to the Houston Astros in exchange for minor league pitcher Trent Thornton. During his tenure as an Astro, Díaz, who had mostly appeared at shortstop, became the team's utility player, and started at three new positions in the major leagues – second base, first base, and left field. In 2019, he batted .271/.356/.467 with nine home runs and 40 RBIs in 210 at bats.

In 2020, he batted .241/.254/.483 with three home runs and six RBIs in 58 at bats.

On June 6, 2021, Díaz suffered a fracture in his left hand on a hit by pitch delivered from Ross Stripling in a game versus the Blue Jays. Díaz was expected to miss six to eight weeks. During the 2021 regular season, he batted .259/.317/.405 with eight home runs and 45 RBIs in 294 at bats.

In World Series play on October 29, 2021, Díaz hit a single to right field to end the Atlanta Braves' no-hit bid in the eighth inning of Game 3.

==== 2022 ====
Díaz avoided arbitration with the Astros on March 22, 2022, agreeing to a $4.45 million contract for the season. On May 8, 2022, Díaz hit a grand slam versus the Detroit Tigers to lead a 5–0 Astros win. He started at third base and homered on June 4 to help lead a 10–3 win over the Kansas City Royals, and added two singles for his first three-hit game of the season. Díaz singled and scored in the ninth on July 12 versus the Los Angeles Angels to catalyze a four run comeback after hitting an early two-run home run and walking twice. He homered twice on July 29 versus the Seattle Mariners to help fuel an 11–1 rout. On August 6, Díaz started at shortstop versus Cleveland, doubling twice and driving in one run. Díaz hit his second grand slam of the season versus Martín Pérez of the Texas Rangers on August 9, bringing the Astros back from a 4–0 deficit to result in a 7–5 win.

On August 16, Díaz exited a game versus the Chicago White Sox due to a groin injury, and was placed on the 10-day injured list the following day. He was activated on September 13.

In 2022 he batted .243/.287/.403 in 305 at bats with 12 home runs and 38 RBIs in 305 at bats. He played 28 games in left field, 22 at second base, 18 at shortstop, 10 at third base, 7 at DH, 6 at first base, and one in right field. The Astros advanced to the World Series and defeated the Philadelphia Phillies in six games to give Díaz his first career World Series title.

Following the World Series, Díaz became a free agent.

=== Oakland Athletics ===
On December 13, 2022, Díaz signed a two-year contract with the Oakland Athletics. In 2023, he appeared in 109 games, including 40 at both third base and shortstop. It was the highest number of games played for Díaz since 2018. He hit .229 with 4 home runs and 24 RBI. He had career lows in batting average, on-base plus slugging (OPS), and slugging percentage. He was the highest paid position player on the team with an annual salary of $6.5 million.

During spring training prior to the 2024 season, Díaz suffered a groin strain. While rehabbing, he suffered a calf strain. The injuries kept him off the field for most of the Athletics spring training, and he was placed on the 60–day injured list to begin the season. On May 27, 2024, Díaz was activated off of the injured list. In 12 games for the Athletics, he went 3–for–29 (.103) with no home runs and one RBI. On July 2, Díaz was designated for assignment by Oakland. He was released by the organization on July 5.

=== Houston Astros (second stint) ===
On July 13, 2024, Díaz signed a minor league contract with the Houston Astros. In four games with the rookie–level Florida Complex League Astros, he batted .333 with two RBI. On July 22, Houston selected Díaz's contract, adding him to their major league roster. In his first game with the Astros since 2022, Díaz went 0–3 with a strikeout. Díaz was released by the Astros following the promotion of Shay Whitcomb on August 16.

=== Leones de Yucatán ===
On March 20, 2025, Díaz signed with the Leones de Yucatán of the Mexican League. In 53 appearances for Yucatán, he batted .254/.316/.468 with 11 home runs and 37 RBI. Díaz was released by the Leones on July 11.

=== Tecolotes de los Dos Laredos ===
On July 11, 2025, Díaz signed with the Tecolotes de los Dos Laredos of the Mexican League. In 22 appearances for Dos Laredos, he batted .341/.379/.568 with five home runs, 17 RBI, and one stolen base. On April 10, 2026, Díaz was released by the Tecolotes.

== Personal life ==
Díaz and wife Dayara have one son, born August 5, 2016. They reside in West Palm Beach, Florida, in the offseason.

== See also ==
- List of baseball players who defected from Cuba
- List of Major League Baseball players from Cuba
