= Devon Travis =

American baseball player (born 1991)

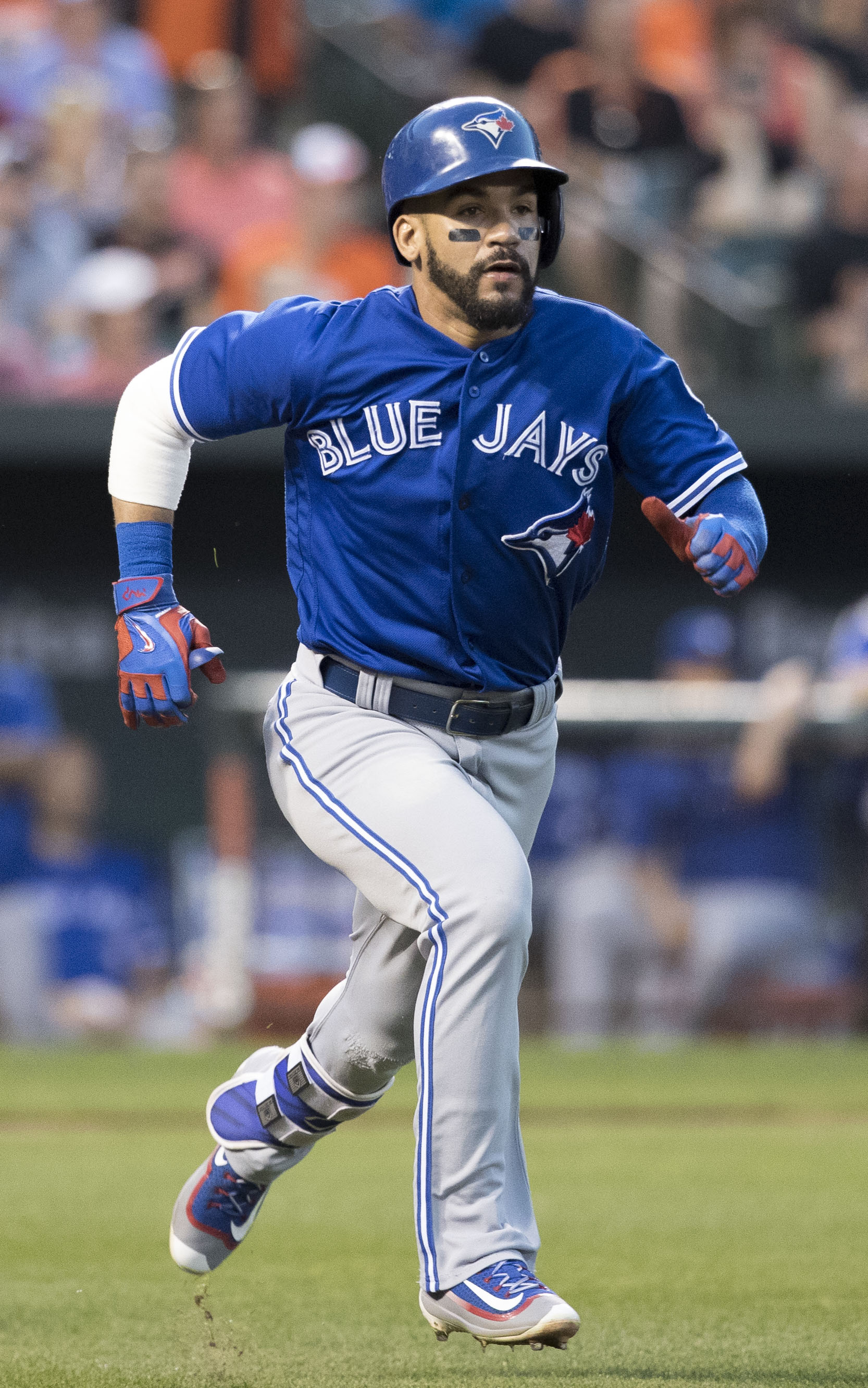
- Travis with the Toronto Blue Jays in 2016
- Second baseman
- Born: February 21, 1991 (age 35); West Palm Beach, Florida, U.S.
- Batted: Right Threw: Right

MLB debut
- April 6, 2015, for the Toronto Blue Jays

Last MLB appearance
- September 21, 2018, for the Toronto Blue Jays

MLB statistics
- Batting average: .274
- Home runs: 35
- Runs batted in: 153
- Stats at Baseball Reference

Teams
- Toronto Blue Jays (2015–2018)

Career highlights and awards
- AL Rookie of the Month (April 2015)

Devon Anthony Travis (born February 21, 1991) is an American professional baseball coach and former second baseman. He was originally drafted by the Detroit Tigers, and made his Major League Baseball (MLB) debut on April 6, 2015 with the Toronto Blue Jays, playing with the team from 2015 to 2018. Travis began his coaching career in 2021 with the GCL Braves.

== Early career ==
In 2003, Travis played in the Little League World Series, representing Boynton Beach, Florida. They finished as the runner-up to the team from Tokyo, Japan. He attended Palm Beach Central High School in Wellington, Florida. He enrolled at Florida State University to play college baseball for the Florida State Seminoles. In 2010, he played collegiate summer baseball with the Bourne Braves of the Cape Cod Baseball League.

== Professional career ==
=== Detroit Tigers ===
The Detroit Tigers selected Travis in the 13th round of the 2012 Major League Baseball draft. He started his career with the short-season Connecticut Tigers, hitting .280/.352/.441 with three home runs and 11 runs batted in (RBI) in 25 games.

Travis started the 2013 season with the Class A West Michigan Whitecaps. He was the MVP of the Midwest League All-Star Game after going 2-for-2 with a three-run triple. Travis was promoted to the High-A Lakeland Flying Tigers after hitting .352/.430/.486 with six home runs in 77 games with the Whitecaps. He played in 55 games with Lakeland, and batted .350 with 10 home runs and 34 RBI. After the season, he was named the Tigers Minor League Player of the Year, and played 18 games for the Mesa Solar Sox of the Arizona Fall League. Travis played the entire 2014 season with the Double-A Erie SeaWolves, batting .298 with 10 home runs and 52 RBI in 100 games played.

=== Toronto Blue Jays ===
==== 2014–2015 ====
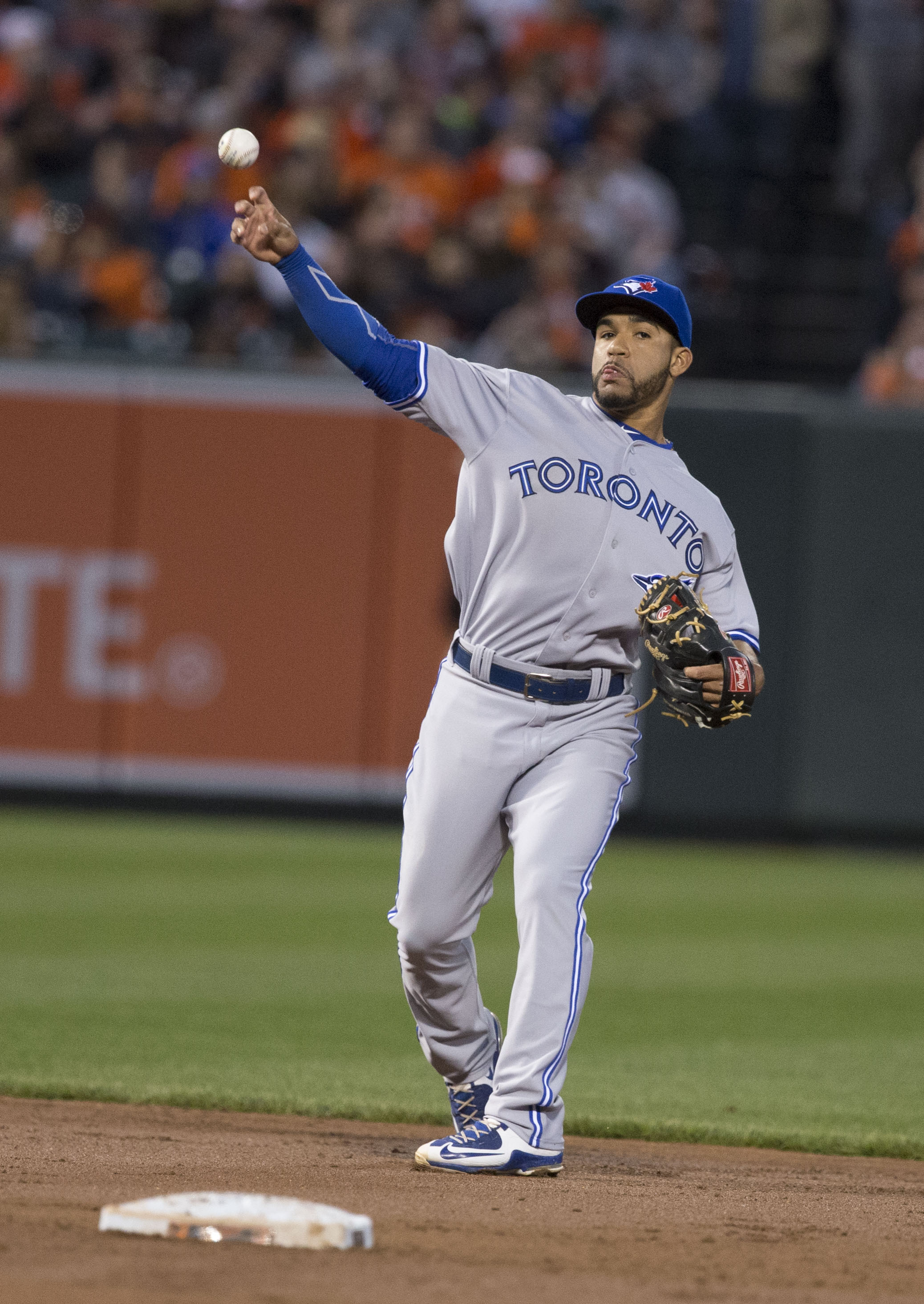
Travis in 2015

On November 12, 2014, Travis was traded to the Toronto Blue Jays for outfielder Anthony Gose. In early 2015 he was named the sixth best second base prospect in baseball, as well as the number nine prospect in the Blue Jays' organization by MLB. After a strong performance in spring training, Travis was announced as the Blue Jays' starting second baseman on March 31, 2015. Travis debuted on April 6 and recorded his first career hit, a solo home run off Chasen Shreve of the New York Yankees. He also recorded two walks and scored two runs as the Blue Jays won 6–1. On April 12, Travis hit a three-run double to help the Blue Jays win 10–7 against the Baltimore Orioles. The hit was initially ruled an error on Travis Snider, however the call was changed on April 16, and Travis was credited with a hit and three RBIs.

Travis was named the Blue Jays Player of the Month for April on May 1. In a 10–7 loss to the Cleveland Indians on May 3, Travis hit his first career grand slam. On May 4, Travis was announced as the winner of the American League Rookie of the Month for April. He batted .325/.393/.625 with six home runs, 17 runs scored, and 19 RBIs. After missing five consecutive games with a left shoulder injury, Travis was placed on the disabled list on May 21. To that point in May, he had batted .185 in 14 games. He was activated off the disabled list on June 26. Travis re-injured his shoulder on July 28, and was placed on the disabled list on July 31. On September 11, he was transferred to the 60-day disabled list. The Blue Jays shut down Travis for the remainder of the season on September 17, and announced that he would undergo an exploratory surgery on his shoulder. He finished 2015 with a .304 batting average, eight home runs, and 35 RBI. On November 18, it was announced that Travis had undergone another surgery on his left shoulder, in an attempt to correct a condition called os acromiale which was discovered during the 2015 regular season, and would require 16–20 weeks to recover from the procedure. Two screws were inserted into his shoulder, in an attempt to stabilize the extra bone in his shoulder.

==== 2016–2019 ====
In late April 2016, Travis began taking part in extended spring training games. He was assigned to the Advanced-A Dunedin Blue Jays for rehab on May 13. On May 18, he was promoted to the Triple-A Buffalo Bisons to continue rehabbing. On May 25, Travis was activated off the disabled list by the Blue Jays and called up. He hit a walk-off infield single on May 28 to help the Blue Jays defeat the Boston Red Sox 10–9. On August 5, Travis hit two home runs in a game for the first time in his career. Leading off against the Kansas City Royals, Travis hit a solo home run to give the Blue Jays an early 1–0 lead. In the ninth inning, he hit another solo home run off Kelvin Herrera to lift Toronto to a 4–3 victory. On August 8, Travis hit his first career triple, which came as part of a four-hit game against the Tampa Bay Rays. Following a game on August 31, the Blue Jays optioned Travis to the Rookie-Advanced Bluefield Blue Jays. The move was made to allow Josh Thole to be re-signed and have postseason eligibility. As the Bluefield season would end on September 1, Travis could be immediately recalled by Toronto afterward, bypassing the ten-day waiting period. Travis was recalled by the Blue Jays on September 2. He finished the season hitting .300 with 11 home runs and 50 RBI in 101 games. Travis played in the Wild Card Game and the first game of the American League Division Series, but missed the remainder of the ALDS with a bone bruise in his right knee. He played in the first game of the Championship Series, but left in the fifth inning after reaggravating his knee injury. On October 15, Travis was removed from the ALCS roster due to injury, and replaced by Justin Smoak. In accordance with MLB rules, Travis was ruled ineligible to return for the postseason, ending his season. On November 18, he underwent right knee surgery to remove a small flap of cartilage, and was expected to be ready for spring training.

Travis struggled early in the 2017 regular season, batting just .130 at the end of April. However, he improved in May and batted .364. In a 7–6 victory over the Texas Rangers on May 26, he hit the second grand slam of his career as well as his 15th double of the month. In doing so, he set the franchise record for extra-base hits in a month by a second baseman, tied Fred Lewis's franchise record for doubles in the month of May, and became the first second baseman to hit more than one grand slam as a Blue Jay. On June 6, 2017, the Blue Jays placed Travis on the DL due to a bone bruise in his right knee. He subsequently underwent surgery in his knee and was expected to miss 3–4 months, but Travis did not return that season and finished the year playing in only 50 games.

On January 12, 2018, Travis signed a one-year, $1.45 million contract with the Blue Jays. In his first 18 games of 2018, Travis recorded a .148 batting average, one home run, and three RBI's. On April 29, he was optioned to Triple-A Buffalo. He was recalled on May 22. Travis finished the season playing in 103 games, hitting .232 with 11 home runs and 44 RBI's. Travis suffered left knee inflammation early in 2019 spring training, though an MRI revealed no structural damage. However, on March 13, he underwent arthroscopic knee surgery to repair a torn meniscus. Travis was outrighted off the Blue Jays roster on November 4, 2019, and elected free agency on November 7.

== Coaching career ==
On March 30, 2021, Travis was announced as a coach for the GCL Braves, the Rookie-level affiliate of the Atlanta Braves. Travis took on a coaching position with the Braves Triple-A affiliate Gwinnett Stripers for the 2022 season.

== Broadcasting ==
On August 20, 2026, ESPN announced that, as part of its alternative broadcast of the Little League World Series, it would be bringing in former Major League Baseball players with historic connections to the annual youth tournament. Devon Travis, along with other alumni like Todd Frazier and Mike Monaco, was announced to be part of this "Alumni Cast".

== Personal life ==
Devon's younger brother, Jordan, also attended Florida State University where he played quarterback, and was drafted by the New York Jets.
