= Taylor Guerrieri =

American baseball player (born 1992)

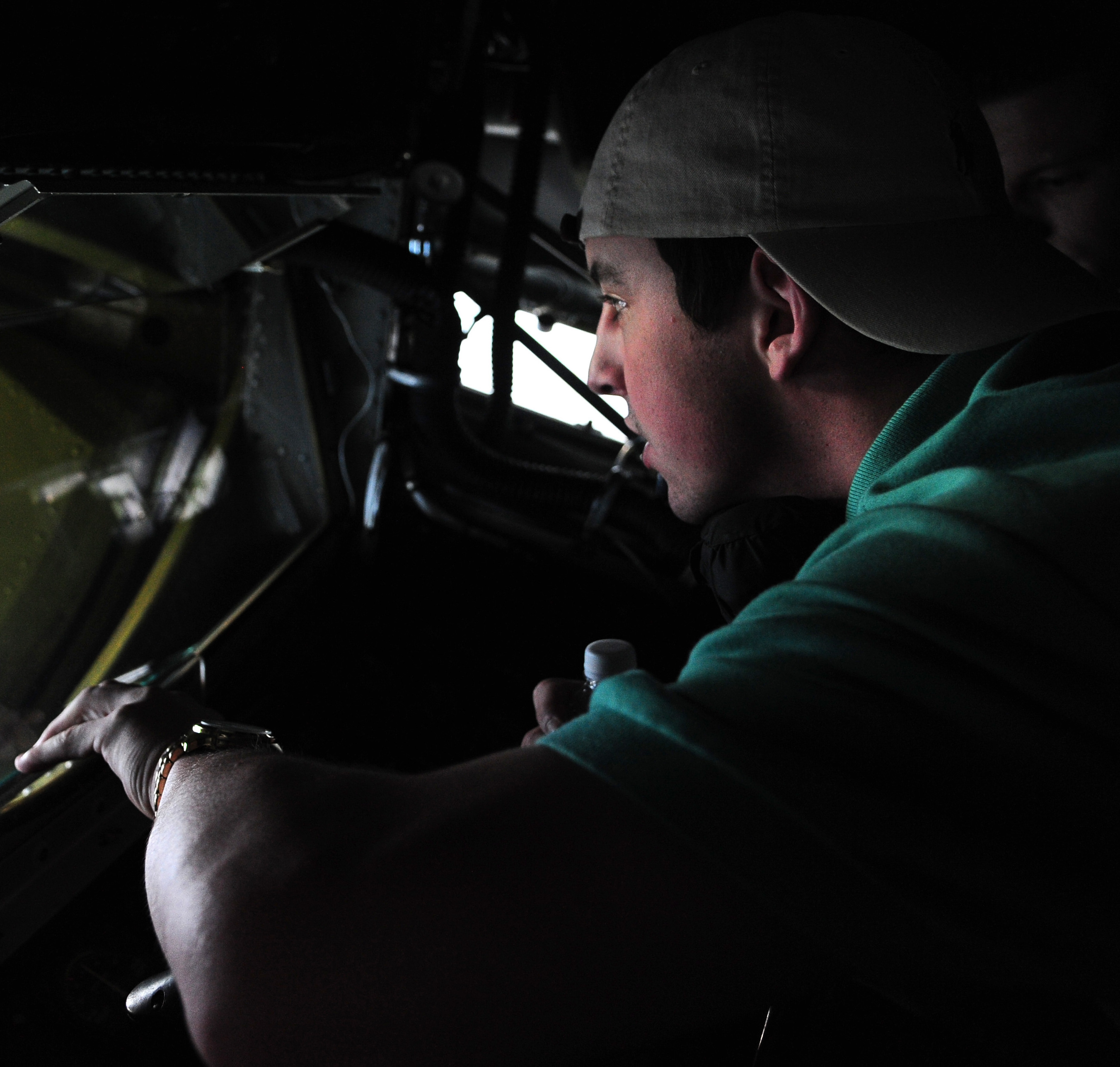
- Guerrieri in a Boeing KC-135 Stratotanker at MacDill Air Force Base in 2013

Free agent
- Pitcher
- Born: December 1, 1992 (age 32); Augusta, Georgia, U.S.
- Bats: Right Throws: Right

MLB debut
- September 1, 2018, for the Toronto Blue Jays

MLB statistics (through 2019 season)
- Win–loss record: 0–0
- Earned run average: 5.50
- Strikeouts: 35
- Stats at Baseball Reference

Teams
- Toronto Blue Jays (2018); Texas Rangers (2019)

Christopher Taylor Guerrieri (born December 1, 1992) is an American professional baseball pitcher who is a free agent. He has previously played in Major League Baseball (MLB) for the Toronto Blue Jays and Texas Rangers.

== Career ==
=== Tampa Bay Rays ===
Guerrieri attended Spring Valley High School in Columbia, South Carolina. He committed to attend the University of South Carolina on a college baseball scholarship. The Tampa Bay Rays of Major League Baseball (MLB) selected him in the first round, with the 24th overall selection, of the 2011 MLB draft. He signed with the Rays, receiving a $1.6 million signing bonus. He pitched for the Hudson Valley Renegades of the Low–A New York–Penn League, pitching to a 1–2 win–loss record and a 1.04 earned run average (ERA) with 45 strikeouts and five walks in 52 innings pitched. Before the 2012 season, MLB.com rated Guerrieri as the 99th best prospect in baseball.

Guerrieri started the 2013 season with a 6–2 win–loss record and a 2.01 ERA in 14 games started with the Bowling Green Hot Rods of the Single–A Midwest League. He was chosen to represent the Rays at the 2013 All-Star Futures Game. He reported fatigue in his arm in June and was given two weeks off. C. J. Riefenhauser replaced Guerrieri at the Futures Game. Guerrieri then lasted only two innings after suffering elbow discomfort in his throwing arm, and underwent Tommy John surgery to repair a torn UCL in his elbow on July 24, 2013. He received a 50-game suspension after the 2013 season, which he served while rehabilitating from surgery, for using a substance of abuse.

Guerrieri rehabilitated from his injury, with the expectation of being assigned to a minor league team by mid-May 2015. In May, he made his season debut with the Charlotte Stone Crabs of the High–A Florida State League. The Rays promoted Guerrieri to the Montgomery Biscuits of the Double–A Southern League during the season, and added him to their 40-man roster after the season in order to protect him from the Rule 5 draft. He spent the 2016 season with Montgomery. Guerrieri was promoted to the Durham Bulls of the Triple–A International League for 2017. After making two starts, he suffered an elbow injury and did not appear in another game.

=== Toronto Blue Jays ===
On November 5, 2017, the Toronto Blue Jays acquired Guerrieri on waivers. He began the 2018 campaign with the Triple–A Buffalo Bisons of the International League. The Blue Jays promoted him to the major leagues on September 1, 2018. On November 2, Guerrieri cleared waivers and entered free agency.

=== Texas Rangers ===
On January 9, 2019, the Texas Rangers signed Guerrieri to a minor league contract with an invitation to spring training. He was assigned to the Triple–A Nashville Sounds to open the season. On July 16, the Rangers selected Guerrieri's contract, adding him to their active roster Guerrieri was designated for assignment on November 20. He accepted an outright assignment to Nashville on November 27.

Guerrieri did not play in a game in 2020 due to the cancellation of the minor league season because of the COVID-19 pandemic. He elected free agency on October 1, 2020.

=== Seattle Mariners ===
On February 8, 2021, Guerrieri signed a minor league contract with the Seattle Mariners that included an invitation to spring training. Guerrieri appeared in 22 games with the Triple–A Tacoma Rainiers, recording a 4.61 ERA with 28 strikeouts. Guerrieri was released by the Mariners organization on August 12.

=== Philadelphia Phillies ===
On August 24, 2021, Guerrieri signed a minor league contract with the Philadelphia Phillies organization. He was assigned to the Triple–A Lehigh Valley IronPigs, where he made 7 appearances and struggled to a 6.48 ERA with 10 strikeouts in 8 1/3 innings pitched. Guerrieri elected free agency following the season on November 7.

=== High Point Rockers ===
On May 16, 2023, Guerrieri signed with the High Point Rockers of the Atlantic League of Professional Baseball. In 30 relief outings for the Rockers, he recorded a 4.55 ERA with 30 strikeouts across 29 2/3 innings pitched.

On April 15, 2024, Guerrieri re–signed with the Rockers. In 11 games (9 starts) for the Rockers, he compiled a 3–3 record and 4.37 ERA with 37 strikeouts over 45 1/3 innings pitched. Guerrieri was released by High Point on September 3.

On April 16, 2025, Guerrieri re-signed with High Point. He made one starts for the Rockers, allowing six runs on eight hits with two walks and five strikeouts over 3 1/3 innings. Guerrieri was released by the team on May 7.

== See also ==
  - List of Spring Valley High School alumni
