= Mike Hauschild =

American baseball player (born 1990)

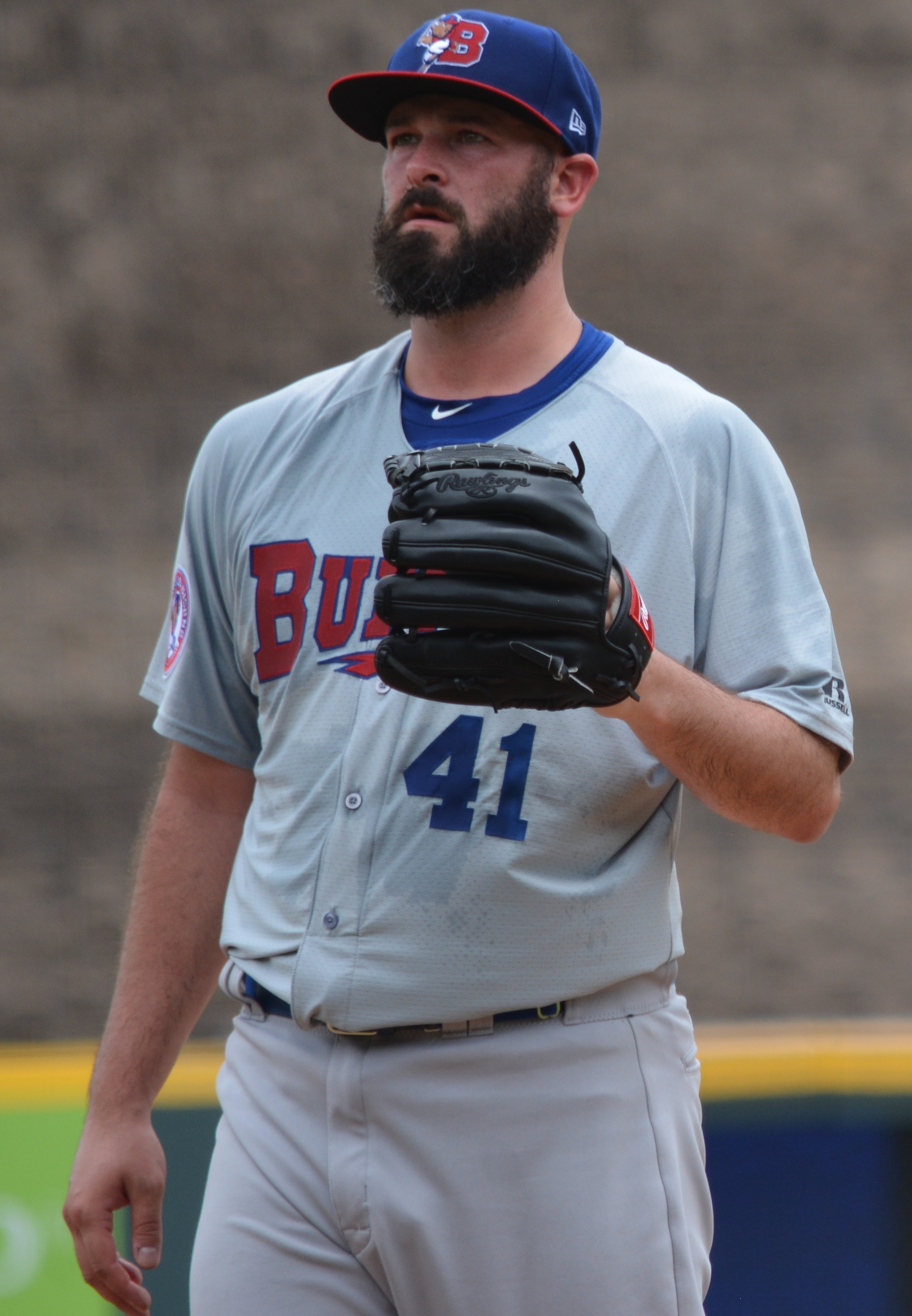
- Hauschild with the Buffalo Bisons in 2018
- Pitcher
- Born: January 22, 1990 (age 36); Dayton, Ohio, U.S.
- Batted: Right Threw: Right

MLB debut
- April 8, 2017, for the Texas Rangers

Last MLB appearance
- August 8, 2018, for the Toronto Blue Jays

MLB statistics
- Win–loss record: 1–1
- Earned run average: 7.71
- Strikeouts: 12
- Stats at Baseball Reference

Teams
- Texas Rangers (2017); Toronto Blue Jays (2018)

Michael Hauschild (born January 22, 1990) is an American former professional baseball pitcher. He played in Major League Baseball (MLB) for the Toronto Blue Jays and Texas Rangers.

== Amateur career ==
Hauschild attended Beavercreek High School in Beavercreek, Ohio, and played college baseball at the University of Dayton. In 2011, he played collegiate summer baseball with the Orleans Firebirds of the Cape Cod Baseball League.

== Professional career ==
=== Houston Astros ===
Hauschild was drafted by the Houston Astros in the 33rd round of the 2012 Major League Baseball draft. He made his professional debut for the rookie ball Greeneville Astros. Hauschild split the 2013 season between the Single-A Quad Cities River Bandits and the High-A Lancaster JetHawks, pitching to a cumulative 9–4 record and 3.50 ERA in 28 appearances. He split 2014 between Lancaster and the Double-A Corpus Christi Hooks, recording a 4–10 record and 4.32 ERA in 133 1/3 innings pitched. In 2015, Hauschild reached Triple-A for the first time, splitting the season between the Fresno Grizzlies and Corpus Christi. On the year, he registered a 12–6 record and 3.38 ERA in 138 1/3 innings of work. Hauschild spent all of 2016 in Fresno, pitching to a 9–10 record and 3.22 ERA in 24 games.

=== Texas Rangers ===
On December 8, 2016, Hauschild was selected by the Texas Rangers in the Rule 5 draft. Hauschild made the Rangers' Opening Day roster in 2017. Hauschild allowed 10 runs in 8 innings in 4 appearances for Texas. On April 20, 2017, Hauschild was designated for assignment by the Rangers.

=== Houston Astros (second stint) ===
He was returned to the Houston Astros on April 22, 2017. Hauschild spent the remainder of the season with the Triple-A Fresno Grizzlies, recording a 4.58 ERA in 18 games. He was invited to Spring Training with the Astros for the 2018 season but did not make the club and was assigned to Fresno to start the year. On July 30, 2018, the Astros released Hauschild.

=== Toronto Blue Jays ===
On August 2, 2018, Hauschild signed with the Toronto Blue Jays. On September 4, Hauschild was designated for assignment after allowing 4 runs in 8 1/3 innings of work. He elected free agency on October 2.

=== St. Louis Cardinals ===
On November 15, 2018, Hauschild signed a minor league contract with the St. Louis Cardinals. In 10 games (9 starts) for the Triple-A Memphis Redbirds, he struggled to a 1–3 record and 7.96 ERA with 23 strikeouts over 37 1/3 innings of work. Hauschild was released by the Cardinals organization on July 30, 2019.

=== Sugar Land Skeeters ===
On August 4, 2019, Hauschild signed with the Sugar Land Skeeters of the Atlantic League of Professional Baseball. In 9 starts for Sugar Land, he logged a 4–0 record and 2.50 ERA with 40 strikeouts across 50 1/3 innings pitched. Hauschild became a free agent following the season.

On February 25, 2020, Hauschild signed with the Generales de Durango of the Mexican League. Hauschild did not play in a game in 2020 due to the cancellation of the Mexican League season because of the COVID-19 pandemic.

=== Lexington Legends ===
On May 4, 2021, Hauschild signed with the Lexington Legends of the Atlantic League of Professional Baseball. In 3 games for the Legends, Hauschild recorded a 1–2 record and 3.68 ERA.

=== Chicago Cubs ===
On June 10, 2021, Hauschild's contract was purchased by the Chicago Cubs organization. In 13 games (12 starts) for the Triple-A Iowa Cubs, he struggled to an 0–7 record and 6.96 ERA with 33 strikeouts across 54 1/3 innings pitched. Hauschild elected free agency following the season on November 7.

== See also ==
- Rule 5 draft results
